= 1980 NBA Finals =

North America basketball championship

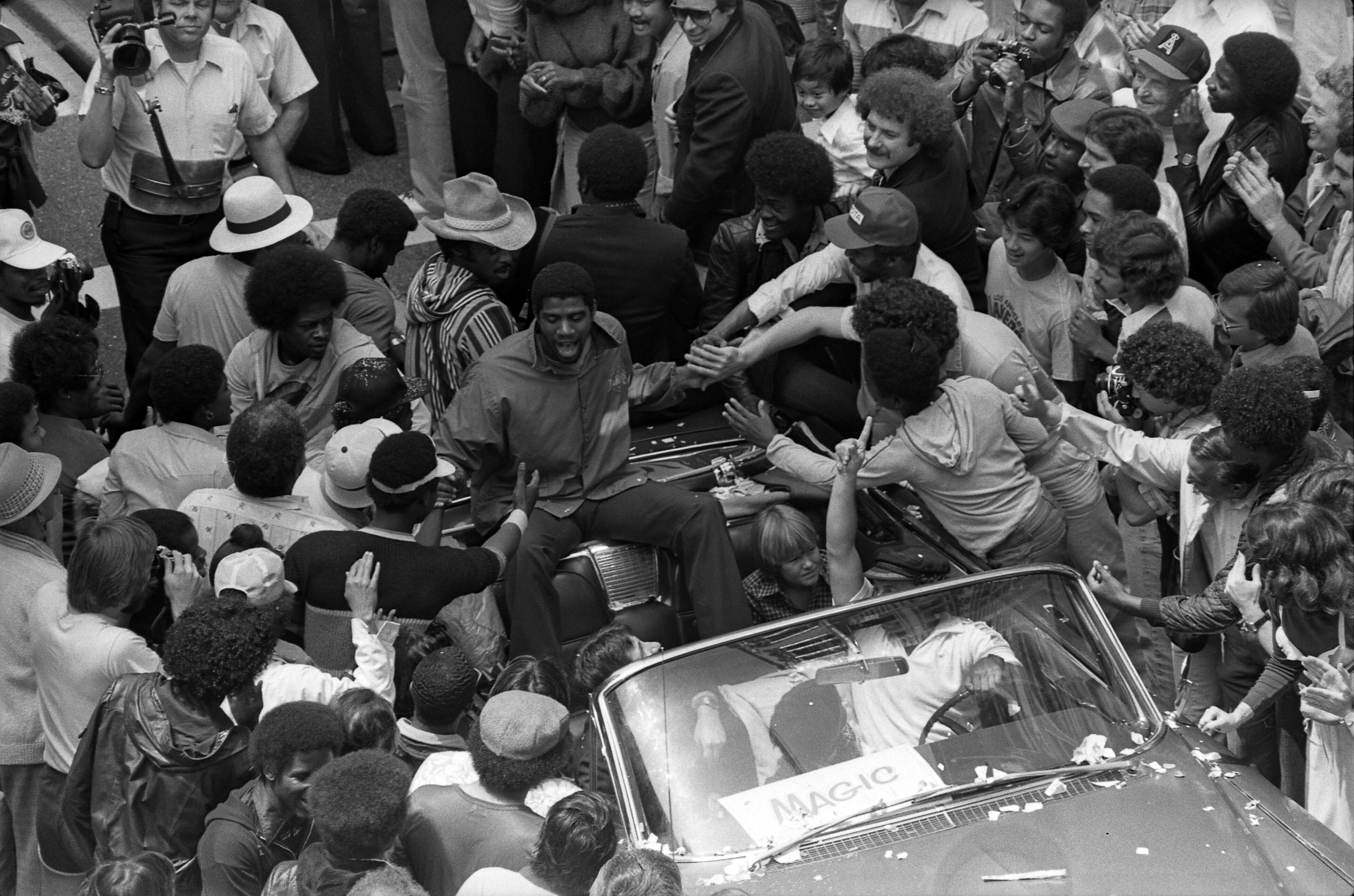
- A crowd surrounds Magic Johnson at the Lakers championship parade
Team	Coach	Wins
Los Angeles Lakers	Paul Westhead	4
Philadelphia 76ers	Billy Cunningham	2
- Dates: May 4–16
- MVP: Magic Johnson (Los Angeles Lakers)
- Hall of Famers: Lakers: Kareem Abdul-Jabbar (1995); Michael Cooper (2024); Spencer Haywood (2015); Magic Johnson (2002); Jamaal Wilkes (2012); 76ers: Maurice Cheeks (2018); Doug Collins (2024; did not play); Julius Erving (1993); Bobby Jones (2019); Coaches: Billy Cunningham (1986); Chuck Daly (1994); Pat Riley (2008); Officials: Darell Garretson (2016); Earl Strom (1995)
- Eastern finals: 76ers defeated Celtics, 4–1
- Western finals: Lakers defeated SuperSonics, 4–1

The 1980 NBA World Championship Series was the championship round of the National Basketball Association (NBA)'s 1979–80 season, and the conclusion of the season's playoffs. The Western Conference champion Los Angeles Lakers defeated the Eastern Conference champion Philadelphia 76ers in six games to win their seventh NBA championship.

Kareem Abdul-Jabbar was the league's MVP, but midway through Game 5, the Lakers center suffered a severely sprained ankle. He managed to come back in the game in the fourth quarter to lead the Lakers to victory and a 3–2 lead in the best-of-seven series. But the Lakers still had to travel to Philadelphia for Game 6. Abdul-Jabbar was listed as out of Game 6, although 76ers coach Billy Cunningham was quoted as saying "I won't believe he's not playing until their plane lands and he's not on it." As it turned out, Kareem did not make the trip and was listed as doubtful if Game 7 had been needed.

In Game 6, Magic Johnson played what may have been the greatest game of his career. Playing on the road, Johnson (a 6'9" rookie point guard) started the game at center and eventually played all five positions in a dominating performance. Scoring a game-high 42 points and grabbing a game-high 15 rebounds—and handing out seven assists— Johnson led the Lakers to the NBA crown. The Lakers also received strong performances from Jamaal Wilkes with 37 points and 10 rebounds, and Norm Nixon. Jim Chones played strong defense on 76ers center Darryl Dawkins, while Mark Landsberger provided rebounding off the bench, and little used Brad Holland who chipped in eight key points.

Magic Johnson's performance in Game 6 and the series earned him the 1980 NBA Finals Most Valuable Player (MVP). What made Johnson's performance even more remarkable was that he was an NBA rookie—and, indeed, one who had left college after only two years, and was only 20 years old. "Jamaal Wilkes had an unbelievable game", said Johnson in 2011. "Everybody talked about my 42 points, but it was also his 37-point effort."

In Game 4 of the 1980 Finals, Julius Erving executed the legendary Baseline Move, a behind-the-board reverse layup that seemed to defy gravity. Play-by-play announcer Brent Musburger has noted that Erving made such moves almost routinely in his ABA days—but the ABA had no national TV contract in those days. This Game 4 move, played to a national audience in a title game, has probably become Julius Erving's most famous move.

This was also the first NBA Finals to make use of the three-point line, which debuted that season.

Many consider this victory as the birth of Showtime.

== Background ==
=== Los Angeles Lakers ===
The last time the Lakers had won the NBA championship was in 1972. In the eight years between championships, the Lakers made the NBA Finals again in 1973 and lost to the New York Knicks in five games. Then Wilt Chamberlain and Jerry West retired, and the Lakers missed the playoffs in 1975 and 1976. In between, Kareem Abdul-Jabbar was acquired (in the off-season in 1975), and the Lakers returned to prominence in 1977 with a 53–29 record, but a loss via the champion-Portland Trail Blazers in the Western Conference Finals. However, the Lakers traded key pieces of their roster for Kareem and did surround him with much talent in his first three seasons in Los Angeles.

The Lakers earned the top pick of the 1979 NBA draft (traded as compensation by the New Orleans Jazz after signing Gail Goodrich in 1976) and selected Magic Johnson from Michigan State. It was one of then-owner Jack Kent Cooke's final acts before selling the team to Jerry Buss during that summer. While Magic dazzled in his rookie season, Kareem would enjoy an MVP campaign in the Lakers' 60–22 regular season. The Lakers began the season being coached by Jack McKinney as owner Jerry Buss, who had recently acquired the team, wanted games to be entertaining, and hired the coach to install a running offense. On November 8, 1979, the Lakers were 9–4 after 13 games, when McKinney suffered a near fatal head injury after falling while bicycling. Assistant coach Paul Westhead, who also worked under McKinney at St. Joseph's, was named the interim head coach. However, the length of the recovery and lingering doubts about the complete return of McKinney's mental faculties, combined with the team's level of success under Westhead, ultimately meant that McKinney would never get the chance to return to the job. Westhead continued to use McKinney's offense, a creative and spontaneous offense that came to be known as Showtime, and the team finished the season with a record of 60–22. The Lakers advanced to that year's NBA Finals and McKinney was fired by Buss mid-series on May 13, 1980. After the Lakers won the series for their first of five NBA titles in nine seasons, Buss hired Westhead to permanently replace McKinney, who was hired by the Indiana Pacers as successor to Slick Leonard.

Behind Johnson's passing, Abdul-Jabbar's post play and Michael Cooper's perimeter shooting and defense, the trio formed the core of the Lakers' Showtime-era teams. The chemistry between the three was evident early on, as the Lakers eliminated the Phoenix Suns and defending champions Seattle SuperSonics in a pair of five-game playoff series to advance to the NBA Finals.

=== Philadelphia 76ers ===
Julius Erving arrived before the 1976–77 season, and with him as the focal point of the offense, the 76ers soon transformed into a title contender. But after losing to the Portland Trail Blazers in the 1977 NBA Finals, the 76ers realized that a fancy and one-on-one style of play would not take them all the way. Thus they hired former player Billy Cunningham as head coach, and in 1978 the team traded for defensive stalwart Bobby Jones and drafted Maurice Cheeks, while letting go players such as George McGinnis and World B. Free.

In the 1979–80 season the 76ers finished 59–23, two games behind the Boston Celtics in the Atlantic Division. In the playoffs, they eliminated the Washington Bullets in two games, and the Atlanta Hawks in five games. In the Eastern Conference finals, the 76ers faced NBA Rookie of the Year Award winner Larry Bird and the 61–win Celtics, and owing to the core's three consecutive playoff appearances, the more experienced 76ers were favored to win the series. Proving the prognosticators right, Philadelphia won in five games, preventing the first Celtics–Lakers final since 1969.

The 76ers were the first of the four Philadelphia professional sports teams to play for their respective sports' championships in the 1980 season. The Flyers lost the Stanley Cup Final against the New York Islanders in overtime of Game 6, eight days after the 76ers fell to the Lakers in their Game 6. The Phillies beat the Kansas City Royals, themselves in six games, in the World Series. The Eagles lost Super Bowl XV to the Oakland Raiders in January 1981.

Of note, this marked the first of the ten NBA Finals played in the 1980s, all of which featured either the Boston Celtics or the Los Angeles Lakers (three Finals featured both teams).

=== Road to the Finals ===
Los Angeles Lakers (Western Conference champion)		Philadelphia 76ers (Eastern Conference champion)
# / Western Conference; # / Team / W / L / PCT / GB; 1 / c-Los Angeles Lakers / 60 / 22 / .732 / –; 2 / y-Milwaukee Bucks / 49 / 33 / .598 / 11; 3 / x-Seattle SuperSonics / 56 / 26 / .683 / 4; 4 / x-Phoenix Suns / 55 / 27 / .671 / 5; 5 / x-Kansas City Kings / 47 / 35 / .573 / 13; 6 / x-Portland Trail Blazers / 38 / 44 / .463 / 22; 7 / San Diego Clippers / 35 / 47 / .427 / 25; 8 / Chicago Bulls / 30 / 52 / .366 / 30; 9 / Denver Nuggets / 30 / 52 / .366 / 30; 10 / Utah Jazz / 24 / 58 / .293 / 36; 11 / Golden State Warriors / 24 / 58 / .293 / 36; 1st seed in the West, 2nd best league record	Regular season	# / Eastern Conference; # / Team / W / L / PCT / GB; 1 / z-Boston Celtics / 61 / 21 / .744 / –; 2 / y-Atlanta Hawks / 50 / 32 / .610 / 11; 3 / x-Philadelphia 76ers / 59 / 23 / .720 / 2; 4 / x-Houston Rockets / 41 / 41 / .500 / 20; 5 / x-San Antonio Spurs / 41 / 41 / .500 / 20; 6 / x-Washington Bullets / 39 / 43 / .476 / 22; 7 / New York Knicks / 39 / 43 / .476 / 22; 8 / Cleveland Cavaliers / 37 / 45 / .451 / 24; 8 / Indiana Pacers / 37 / 45 / .451 / 24; 10 / New Jersey Nets / 34 / 48 / .415 / 27; 11 / Detroit Pistons / 16 / 66 / .195 / 44; 3rd seed in the East, 3rd best league record
Earned first-round bye	First round	Defeated the (6) Washington Bullets, 2–0
Defeated the (4) Phoenix Suns, 4–1	Conference semifinals	Defeated the (2) Atlanta Hawks, 4–1
Defeated the (3) Seattle SuperSonics, 4–1	Conference finals	Defeated the (1) Boston Celtics, 4–1

=== Regular season series ===
Both teams split the two meetings, each won by the home team:

January 25, 1980

Philadelphia 76ers 103, Los Angeles Lakers 124

The Forum, Los Angeles

February 10, 1980

Los Angeles Lakers 104, Philadelphia 76ers 105

The Spectrum, Philadelphia

== Series summary ==
Game	Date	Home team	Result	Road team
Game 1	May 4	Los Angeles Lakers	109–102 (1–0)	Philadelphia 76ers
Game 2	May 7	Los Angeles Lakers	104–107 (1–1)	Philadelphia 76ers
Game 3	May 10	Philadelphia 76ers	101–111 (1–2)	Los Angeles Lakers
Game 4	May 11	Philadelphia 76ers	105–102 (2–2)	Los Angeles Lakers
Game 5	May 14	Los Angeles Lakers	108–103 (3–2)	Philadelphia 76ers
Game 6	May 16	Philadelphia 76ers	107–123 (2–4)	Los Angeles Lakers

== Game summaries ==
=== Game 1 ===
CBS

May 4
12:30 p.m. PDT

Philadelphia 76ers 102, Los Angeles Lakers 109
Scoring by quarter: 28–26, 25–27, 17–31, 32–25
Pts: Julius Erving 20; Rebs: Bobby Jones 10; Asts: Lionel Hollins 8	Pts: Kareem Abdul-Jabbar 33; Rebs: Kareem Abdul-Jabbar 14; Asts: Magic Johnson 10
Los Angeles leads the series, 1–0

The Forum, Inglewood, California
Attendance: 17,505
Referees:
- No. 12 Earl Strom
- No. 14 Jack Madden

Kareem Abdul-Jabbar, playing on a mission and finally with an effective supporting cast around him, scored 33 points, pulled down 14 rebounds, and had six blocks and five assists on the way to a 109–102 win in the Forum. Norm Nixon had 23 points and Jamaal Wilkes finished with 20 while the Lakers did an excellent job double-teaming Julius Erving. Rookie Magic Johnson contributed 16 points, 10 assists and 9 rebounds.

=== Game 2 ===
CBS

May 7
8:30 p.m. PDT

Philadelphia 76ers 107, Los Angeles Lakers 104
Scoring by quarter: 31–21, 28–20, 30–30, 18–33
Pts: Darryl Dawkins 25; Rebs: Julius Erving 10; Asts: Maurice Cheeks 10	Pts: Kareem Abdul-Jabbar 38; Rebs: Kareem Abdul-Jabbar 14; Asts: Magic Johnson 11
Series tied, 1–1

The Forum, Inglewood, California
Attendance: 17,505
Referees:
- No. 7 Joe Gushue
- No. 11 Jake O'Donnell

Kareem Abdul-Jabbar continued to dominate, with 38 points in Game 2. But, this time, he got very little help as the Laker break never got going.

Julius Erving scored 12 points in the first quarter on his way to 23, beginning the game with a dunk over Abdul-Jabbar. Maurice Cheeks matched Erving's total of 23 points, while Bobby Jones added 13 off the bench. The key was Darryl Dawkins, who had one of his best games of the season by scoring 25 points, many of them on outside shots trying to draw Abdul-Jabbar away from the basket.

The Sixers led by as much as 20 in the fourth period, but the Lakers roared back, trimming the lead to 105–104 late in the game. Then, Jones popped in a jumper with seven seconds left, and that was enough for a 107–104 Philly win that tied the series at a game apiece.

=== Game 3 ===
CBS

May 10
3:30 p.m. EDT

Los Angeles Lakers 111, Philadelphia 76ers 101
Scoring by quarter: 31–18, 27–26, 26–21, 27–36
Pts: Kareem Abdul-Jabbar 33; Rebs: Kareem Abdul-Jabbar 14; Asts: Norm Nixon 7	Pts: Julius Erving 24; Rebs: Caldwell Jones 11; Asts: Lionel Hollins 9
Los Angeles leads the series, 2–1

The Spectrum, Philadelphia
Attendance: 18,726
Referees:
- No. 10 Darell Garretson
- No. 4 Ed T. Rush

With a split in L.A., the Sixers were hoping to take command of the series with the next two games in Philadelphia. The Lakers, however, ended those hopes by taking a 15-point lead in the first quarter. Julius Erving led a short comeback in the second, but a 9–0 run by the Lakers extended their lead to 14 at the half.

Kareem Abdul-Jabbar once again had a big game with 33 points, 14 rebounds, four blocks and three assists as the Lakers cruised to a 111–101 win. Julius Erving scored the only three-pointer of the series (and first in NBA Finals history) in this game.

=== Game 4 ===
CBS

May 11
1 p.m. EDT

Los Angeles Lakers 102, Philadelphia 76ers 105
Scoring by quarter: 21–28, 30–21, 25–32, 26–24
Pts: Magic Johnson 28; Rebs: Kareem Abdul-Jabbar 11; Asts: Magic Johnson 9	Pts: Darryl Dawkins 26; Rebs: Caldwell Jones 10; Asts: Lionel Hollins 13
Series tied, 2–2

The Spectrum, Philadelphia
Attendance: 18,726
Referees:
- No. 11 Jake O'Donnell
- No. 22 Paul Mihalak

This game was a nip-and-tuck affair that was highlighted by Julius Erving's signature "Baseline Move" in the fourth quarter. The Sixers went on to even the series with a 105–102 win. Darryl Dawkins led the Sixers with 26 points and Erving added 23.

=== Game 5 ===
CBS

May 14
8:30 p.m. PDT

Philadelphia 76ers 103, Los Angeles Lakers 108
Scoring by quarter: 22–25, 31–25, 20–31, 30–27
Pts: Julius Erving 36; Rebs: Caldwell Jones 10; Asts: Lionel Hollins 10	Pts: Kareem Abdul-Jabbar 40; Rebs: Abdul-Jabbar, Johnson 15 each Asts: Magic Johnson 10
Los Angeles leads the series, 3–2

The Forum, Inglewood, California
Attendance: 17,505
Referees:
- No. 10 Darell Garretson
- No. 12 Earl Strom

Back at the Forum, the Lakers held a two-point lead late in the third quarter when Kareem Abdul-Jabbar stepped on Lionel Hollins' foot as he was running upcourt after a Laker basket and twisted his ankle. At that point, Kareem had scored 26 points and was carrying the Lakers, but now he was in the locker room. Magic Johnson then asserted himself by scoring six points and added an assist as Los Angeles moved up by eight at the end of the third.

Abdul-Jabbar then limped back onto the floor. His appearance aroused the Forum regulars and, despite the bad ankle, scored 11 points and had two key blocked shots down the stretch. The Sixers, however, had Julius Erving who scored 11 of the Sixers last 13 points to complete an 8-point comeback, and tie the game at 103–103 with only 43 seconds remaining.

On the Lakers possession, Darryl Dawkins was trying to front Abdul-Jabbar but to no avail as Magic threw a pass overhead so only Erving stood between Kareem and the basket. Abdul-Jabbar, bad ankle and all, dunked emphatically over Erving and drew the foul with 33 seconds left. He converted the 3-point play to take a 106–103 lead.

After a timeout, the Sixers put the ball in the hands of Erving, who tried a spectacular, scooping finger-roll, but missed. Magic got the rebound to seemingly seal the win, but the Lakers tried to force the fast-break and ended up turning the ball over, out-of-bounds. However, the Sixers turned the ball right back over by stepping out of bounds on a desperation 3-point attempt. Norm Nixon would finally seal the game at the foul line by making both of his foul shots. The victory gave the Lakers the crucial 3–2 series lead heading back to Philadelphia.

Kareem Abdul-Jabbar's 14 point 4th quarter on a bad ankle capped an overall 40-point performance. After Game 5 Abdul-Jabbar was averaging 33.4 points per game as compared to eventual MVP Magic Johnson's 17.4.

=== Game 6 ===
CBS

May 16
9 p.m. EDT

Los Angeles Lakers 123, Philadelphia 76ers 107
Scoring by quarter: 32–29, 28–31, 33–23, 30–24
Pts: Magic Johnson 42; Rebs: Magic Johnson 15; Asts: Norm Nixon 9	Pts: Julius Erving 27; Rebs: Bobby Jones 9 Asts: Maurice Cheeks 8
Los Angeles wins the series, 4–2

The Spectrum, Philadelphia
Attendance: 18,726
Referees:
- No. 7 Joe Gushue
- No. 14 Jack Madden

External videos
- Full game broadcast by CBS on YouTube

The Lakers' team doctors declared Abdul-Jabbar and his bad ankle unfit for Game 6 (he wasn't even allowed to make the trip to Philadelphia with the team because of the swelling), so Laker coach Paul Westhead made a bold move by asking Magic Johnson to jump center. Johnson had no problem and was up to the challenge, although he would lose the famous opening tip to Caldwell Jones. Early on, the Sixers seemed unsure how to counter the matchup problem. The Lakers went up 7–0, then 11–4. Finally, the Sixers used their newfound size advantage in the second quarter to take a 52–44 lead. The Lakers countered by collapsing more in the paint and rallied for a 60–60 tie at the half.

Los Angeles opened the third period with a 14–0 run, keyed by Jamaal Wilkes, who had 16 points in the quarter. In the fourth with a little over five minutes left, the Sixers rallied to cut the Laker lead to 103–101. After a timeout, the Lakers went on one last run, with Magic scoring nine points down the stretch on the way to a final 123–107 margin.

Wilkes had a career-high 37 points and added 10 rebounds. Jim Chones effectively shut down the middle in place of Abdul-Jabbar and finished with 11 points and 10 rebounds, and held Darryl Dawkins to 14 points and a scant four rebounds. Michael Cooper, in a rare start, scored 16 points, and Mark Landsberger contributed 10 boards.

Magic Johnson scored 42 points, including all 14 of his free-throw attempts. He added 15 rebounds, seven assists, three steals and a block and was elected MVP of the series. "It was amazing, just amazing", said Erving, who led Philly with 27 points.

== Player statistics ==
Legend
GP	Games played	GS	Games started	MPG	Minutes per game
FG%	Field-goal percentage	3P%	3-point field-goal percentage	FT%	Free-throw percentage
RPG	Rebounds per game	APG	Assists per game	SPG	Steals per game
BPG	Blocks per game	PPG	Points per game

Los Angeles Lakers

Los Angeles Lakers statistics
Player	GP	GS	MPG	FG%	3P%	FT%	RPG	APG	SPG	BPG	PPG
Kareem Abdul-Jabbar	5	5	40.6	.549		.808	13.6	3.2	0.6	4.6	33.4
Magic Johnson	6	6	42.7	.573	.000	.875	11.2	8.7	2.7	0.3	21.5
Jamaal Wilkes	6	6	42.0	.467		.824	7.7	3.2	0.8	0.2	21.3
Norm Nixon	6	6	42.3	.435	.000	.760	3.7	7.0	2.2	0.2	15.5
Michael Cooper	6	1	30.8	.357		.813	4.2	3.3	1.2	0.7	8.8
Jim Chones	6	6	30.8	.528		.750	7.0	1.5	0.8	0.7	8.3
Mark Landsberger	6	0	14.3	.387	.000	.500	6.2	0.2	0.5	0.3	4.2
Brad Holland	3	0	4.3	.667		1.000	0.3	1.0	1.0	0.0	3.3
Spencer Haywood	2	0	2.5	1.000			0.0	0.0	0.0	0.0	1.0
Marty Byrnes	1	0	1.0				0.0	0.0	0.0	0.0	0.0

Philadelphia 76ers

Philadelphia 76ers statistics
Player	GP	GS	MPG	FG%	3P%	FT%	RPG	APG	SPG	BPG	PPG
Julius Erving	6	6	40.7	.522	.250	.708	7.0	5.0	2.0	2.3	25.5
Darryl Dawkins	6	6	33.8	.531	.000	.654	6.0	2.2	1.2	2.3	20.2
Maurice Cheeks	6	6	36.8	.429	.000	.762	3.2	6.7	2.5	0.2	14.7
Lionel Hollins	6	6	36.0	.381	.000	.929	3.7	8.8	2.0	0.3	12.8
Bobby Jones	6	0	26.8	.500		.909	5.7	2.0	1.2	1.8	11.0
Caldwell Jones	6	6	33.7	.476		.700	8.3	1.8	0.2	2.7	9.0
Steve Mix	6	0	15.2	.483		1.000	1.8	1.4	0.2	0.4	7.2
Henry Bibby	6	0	19.0	.333	.000	.750	1.8	3.2	0.2	0.0	5.0
Clint Richardson	1	0	1.0	.000	.000		0.0	0.0	0.0	0.0	0.0
Jim Spanarkel	1	0	1.0				0.0	1.0	0.0	0.0	0.0
Bernard Toone	1	0	1.0				0.0	0.0	0.0	0.0	0.0

== Television coverage ==
The series-deciding Game 6 became the most notorious example of CBS's practice of showing even the most important NBA games on "tape delay" broadcasts. Because May 16, 1980, was a Friday, the network did not want to preempt its two highest-rated shows, The Dukes of Hazzard and Dallas, even though both shows were already in reruns: the 1979–80 TV season had ended early, back in March (Dukes and Dallas both aired their season finale March 21), in anticipation of a strike that summer by the Screen Actors Guild. So Game 6 was shown at 11:30pm Eastern (10:30pm Central) in all but eight US cities: Los Angeles, Philadelphia, Portland, Las Vegas, Seattle, San Francisco, Sacramento and Reno, who carried it live; all but Philadelphia are located in the Pacific Time Zone, thus could show the game live at 6 p.m. local time, then carry CBS's prime time lineup, delayed by a few minutes for the ending of the game. In Atlanta, the CBS affiliate didn't show Game 6 at all, bumping it to independent station WATL-TV, who at least carried the contest live. (This is often cited as an example of TV's lack of interest in the NBA in the "pre-Magic and Bird" era.)

Had Game 7 been played, it would have tipped off at noon Pacific (3 p.m. Eastern).

The 1980 Finals would mark the last play-by-play assignment for Brent Musburger, who was joined on color commentary by Utah Jazz play-by-play announcer Hot Rod Hundley and Boston Celtics legend Bill Russell. Musburger would remain involved with CBS' NBA coverage until 1989, but his duties for later NBA Finals were as a studio host, though he continued to call play-by-play on various occasions. Musburger later called NBA Finals games from 1996 to 2004 for ESPN Radio.

== Team rosters ==
=== Los Angeles Lakers ===
1979–80 Los Angeles Lakers roster
Players

Pos.	No.	Player	Height	Weight	DOB	From
C	33	Kareem Abdul-Jabbar	7 ft 2 in (2.18 m)	225 lb (102 kg)	1947-04-16	UCLA
SF	7	Marty Byrnes	6 ft 7 in (2.01 m)	215 lb (98 kg)	1956-04-30	Syracuse
C	9	Jim Chones	6 ft 11 in (2.11 m)	220 lb (100 kg)	1949-11-30	Marquette
SG	21	Michael Cooper	6 ft 5 in (1.96 m)	170 lb (77 kg)	1956-04-15	New Mexico
PF	31	Spencer Haywood	6 ft 8 in (2.03 m)	225 lb (102 kg)	1949-04-22	Detroit Mercy
SG	14	Brad Holland	6 ft 3 in (1.91 m)	180 lb (82 kg)	1956-12-06	UCLA
SG	32	Magic Johnson	6 ft 9 in (2.06 m)	215 lb (98 kg)	1959-08-14	Michigan State
C	54	Mark Landsberger	6 ft 8 in (2.03 m)	215 lb (98 kg)	1955-05-21	Arizona State
PG	15	Butch Lee	6 ft 0 in (1.83 m)	185 lb (84 kg)	1956-12-05	Marquette
PG	10	Norm Nixon	6 ft 2 in (1.88 m)	170 lb (77 kg)	1955-10-11	Duquesne
SF	52	Jamaal Wilkes	6 ft 6 in (1.98 m)	190 lb (86 kg)	1953-05-02	UCLA

Coaches
Head coach
- Jack McKinney (first 13 games)
- Paul Westhead
Assistant(s)
- Pat Riley

Legend
- (DP) Unsigned draft pick
- (FA) Free agent
- (S) Suspended
- Injured

=== Philadelphia 76ers ===
1979–80 Philadelphia 76ers roster
Players

Pos.	No.	Player	Height	Weight	DOB	From
G	14	Henry Bibby	6 ft 1 in (1.85 m)	185 lb (84 kg)	1949–11–24	UCLA
G	10	Maurice Cheeks	6 ft 1 in (1.85 m)	180 lb (82 kg)	1956–09–08	West Texas A&M
G	20	Doug Collins	6 ft 6 in (1.98 m)	180 lb (82 kg)	1951-07-28	Illinois State
C	53	Darryl Dawkins	6 ft 11 in (2.11 m)	251 lb (114 kg)	1957-01-11	Maynard Evans HS (FL)
F	6	Julius Erving	6 ft 7 in (2.01 m)	210 lb (95 kg)	1950-02-22	UMass
G	9	Lionel Hollins	6 ft 3 in (1.91 m)	185 lb (84 kg)	1953–10–19	Arizona State
F	24	Bobby Jones	6 ft 9 in (2.06 m)	210 lb (95 kg)	1951–12–18	North Carolina
C	11	Caldwell Jones	6 ft 11 in (2.11 m)	217 lb (98 kg)	1950–08–04	Albany State
G	4	Clint Richardson	6 ft 3 in (1.91 m)	195 lb (88 kg)	1956–08–07	Seattle
F	50	Steve Mix	6 ft 7 in (2.01 m)	215 lb (98 kg)	1947–12–30	Toledo
G	34	Jim Spanarkel	6 ft 5 in (1.96 m)	190 lb (86 kg)	1957-06-28	Duke
F	3	Bernard Toone	6 ft 9 in (2.06 m)	210 lb (95 kg)	1956-07-14	Marquette

Coaches
Head coach
- Billy Cunningham
Assistant(s)
- Chuck Daly
- Jack McMahon

Legend
- (DP) Unsigned draft pick
- (FA) Free agent
- (S) Suspended
- Injured

== In popular culture ==
The 1980 NBA Finals was dramatized in the Season 1 of HBO's Winning Time: The Rise of the Lakers Dynasty, which was based on the book Showtime: Magic, Kareem, Riley, and the Los Angeles Lakers Dynasty of the 1980s by Jeff Pearlman.
