= 1979–80 Los Angeles Lakers season =

Season of National Basketball Association team the Los Angeles Lakers

- NBA champions
- Conference champions
- Division champions
- Head coach: Jack McKinney (first 13 games); Paul Westhead
- General manager: Bill Sharman
- Owner: Jerry Buss
- Arena: The Forum

Results
- Record: 60–22 (.732)
- Place: Division: 1st (Pacific); Conference: 1st (Western)
- Playoff finish: NBA champions (Defeated 76ers 4–2)
- Stats at Basketball Reference

Local media
- Television: KHJ-TV
- Radio: KLAC

The 1979–80 Los Angeles Lakers season was the Lakers' 32nd season in the NBA and the 20th season in Los Angeles. It featured a 20-year old rookie Magic Johnson leading the Lakers to their seventh NBA Championship (second in Los Angeles), defeating the Philadelphia 76ers led by Julius Erving in six games in the NBA Finals, which was the first NBA Finals with a three-point line. This was also the team's first season under the ownership of Jerry Buss. Magic's season represented the birth of the Showtime Lakers.

Only 13 games into his tenure, coach Jack McKinney suffered a near-fatal bicycling accident November 8. General manager Bill Sharman elevated assistant Paul Westhead to head coach and hired former Laker Pat Riley as assistant coach.

== Offseason ==
=== NBA draft ===
Round	Pick	Player	Nat.	Pos.	School / Club team
1	1	Magic Johnson	USA	PG	Michigan State
1	14	Brad Holland	USA	SG	UCLA

== Roster ==
1979–80 Los Angeles Lakers roster
Players

Pos.	No.	Player	Height	Weight	DOB	From
C	33	Kareem Abdul-Jabbar	7 ft 2 in (2.18 m)	225 lb (102 kg)	1947-04-16	UCLA
F	7	Marty Byrnes	6 ft 7 in (2.01 m)	215 lb (98 kg)	1956-04-30	Syracuse
C	9	Jim Chones	6 ft 11 in (2.11 m)	220 lb (100 kg)	1949-11-30	Marquette
G	21	Michael Cooper	6 ft 5 in (1.96 m)	170 lb (77 kg)	1956-04-15	New Mexico
F	31	Spencer Haywood	6 ft 8 in (2.03 m)	225 lb (102 kg)	1949-04-22	Detroit Mercy
G	14	Brad Holland	6 ft 3 in (1.91 m)	180 lb (82 kg)	1956-12-06	UCLA
G	32	Magic Johnson	6 ft 9 in (2.06 m)	215 lb (98 kg)	1959-08-14	Michigan State
C	54	Mark Landsberger	6 ft 8 in (2.03 m)	215 lb (98 kg)	1955-05-21	Arizona State
G	15	Butch Lee	6 ft 0 in (1.83 m)	185 lb (84 kg)	1956-12-05	Marquette
G	10	Norm Nixon	6 ft 2 in (1.88 m)	170 lb (77 kg)	1955-10-11	Duquesne
F	52	Jamaal Wilkes	6 ft 6 in (1.98 m)	190 lb (86 kg)	1953-05-02	UCLA

Coaches
Head coach
- Jack McKinney (first 13 games)
- Paul Westhead
Assistant(s)
- Paul Westhead (first 13 games)
- Pat Riley

Legend
- (DP) Unsigned draft pick
- (FA) Free agent
- (S) Suspended
- Injured

Roster
Updated: February 15, 1980

== Regular season ==
=== Season standings ===
Pacific Division	W	L	PCT	GB	Home	Road	Div
y-Los Angeles Lakers	60	22	.732	–	37–4	23–18	19–11
x-Seattle SuperSonics	56	26	.683	4	33–8	23–18	18–12
x-Phoenix Suns	55	27	.671	5	37–5	18–22	19–11
x-Portland Trail Blazers	38	44	.463	22	26–15	12–29	13–17
San Diego Clippers	35	47	.427	25	24–17	11–30	13–17
Golden State Warriors	24	58	.293	36	15–26	9–32	8–22

#	Western Conference				
#	Team	W	L	PCT	GB
1	c-Los Angeles Lakers	60	22	.732	–
2	y-Milwaukee Bucks	49	33	.598	11
3	x-Seattle SuperSonics	56	26	.683	4
4	x-Phoenix Suns	55	27	.671	5
5	x-Kansas City Kings	47	35	.573	13
6	x-Portland Trail Blazers	38	44	.463	22
7	San Diego Clippers	35	47	.427	25
8	Chicago Bulls	30	52	.366	30
9	Denver Nuggets	30	52	.366	30
10	Utah Jazz	24	58	.293	36
11	Golden State Warriors	24	58	.293	36

== Game log ==
=== Regular season ===
1979–80 game log
Total: 60–22 (Home: 37–4; Road: 23–18)
October: 7–3 (home: 5–1; road: 2–2)

Game	Date	Team	Score	High points	High rebounds	High assists	Location Attendance	Record
1	October 12	@ San Diego	W 103-102	Kareem Abdul-Jabbar (29)	Kareem Abdul-Jabbar (10)	3 players tied (4)	San Diego Sports Arena; 8,503	1–0
2	October 16	Chicago	W 105-96	Kareem Abdul-Jabbar (29)	Kareem Abdul-Jabbar (10)	Johnson & Nixon (8)	The Forum	2–0
3	October 17	@ Seattle	L 110-112	Kareem Abdul-Jabbar (23)	Jamaal Wilkes (9)	Norm Nixon (5)	Kingdome	2–1
4	October 19	Portland	L 82-99	Kareem Abdul-Jabbar (22)	Kareem Abdul-Jabbar (13)	Norm Nixon (7)	The Forum	2–2
5	October 21	Seattle	W 106-97	3 players tied (23)	Kareem Abdul-Jabbar (20)	Norm Nixon (9)	The Forum	3–2
6	October 23	Utah	W 102-87	Abdul-Jabbar & Cooper (17)	Jim Chones (16)	Cooper & Nixon (7)	The Forum	4–2
7	October 26	Kansas City	W 116-104	Magic Johnson (26)	Kareem Abdul-Jabbar (16)	Norm Nixon (10)	The Forum	5–2
8	October 28	Golden State	W 97-90	Kareem Abdul-Jabbar (26)	Magic Johnson (10)	Magic Johnson (10)	The Forum	6–2
9	October 30	@ Chicago	W 111-105	Magic Johnson (24)	Kareem Abdul-Jabbar (9)	Magic Johnson (6)	Chicago Stadium	7–2
10	October 31	@ Milwaukee	L 106-110	Norm Nixon (24)	Kareem Abdul-Jabbar (18)	Norm Nixon (12)	MECCA Arena	7–3

November: 9–6 (home: 6–1; road: 3–5)

Game	Date	Team	Score	High points	High rebounds	High assists	Location Attendance	Record
11	November 2	Phoenix	W 112-110	Kareem Abdul-Jabbar (26)	Kareem Abdul-Jabbar (15)	Magic Johnson (10)	The Forum	8–3
12	November 6	San Diego	W 127-112	Kareem Abdul-Jabbar (26)	Kareem Abdul-Jabbar (14)	Norm Nixon (9)	The Forum	9–3
13	November 7	@ Golden State	L 109-126	Jamaal Wilkes (18)	Kareem Abdul-Jabbar (8)	Magic Johnson (6)	Oakland-Alameda County Coliseum Arena	9–4
14	November 9	Denver	W 126-122 (OT)	Magic Johnson (31)	Spencer Haywood (12)	Norm Nixon (9)	The Forum	10–4
15	November 11	Cleveland	W 140-126	Jamaal Wilkes (25)	Magic Johnson (16)	Magic Johnson (12)	The Forum	11–4
16	November 13	@ San Diego	W 137-91	Magic Johnson (22)	Ford & Haywood (8)	Abdul-Jabbar & Johnson (6)	San Diego Sports Arena	12–4
17	November 15	@ Kansas City	L 108-114	Jamaal Wilkes (28)	Kareem Abdul-Jabbar (12)	Magic Johnson (7)	Municipal Auditorium	12–5
18	November 16	@ Denver	W 135-128 (OT)	Kareem Abdul-Jabbar (28)	Jamaal Wilkes (12)	Johnson & Nixon (11)	McNichols Sports Arena	13–5
19	November 18	Indiana	W 127-104	Jamaal Wilkes (21)	Kareem Abdul-Jabbar (12)	Norm Nixon (10)	The Forum	14–5
20	November 20	@ Portland	L 99-114	Kareem Abdul-Jabbar (24)	Magic Johnson (11)	Norm Nixon (6)	Memorial Coliseum	14–6
21	November 21	@ Seattle	L 110-119	Kareem Abdul-Jabbar (31)	Kareem Abdul-Jabbar (13)	Norm Nixon (11)	Kingdome	14–7
22	November 23	@ Phoenix	L 112-126	Magic Johnson (25)	Kareem Abdul-Jabbar (11)	Magic Johnson (6)	Arizona Veterans Memorial Coliseum	14–8
23	November 25	Kansas City	W 111-110	Kareem Abdul-Jabbar (25)	Kareem Abdul-Jabbar (15)	Magic Johnson (9)	The Forum	15–8
24	November 27	@ Utah	W 122-118	Jamaal Wilkes (29)	Magic Johnson (8)	Magic Johnson (8)	Salt Palace	16–8
25	November 30	Chicago	L 100-107	Norm Nixon (30)	Kareem Abdul-Jabbar (19)	Norm Nixon (8)	The Forum	16–9

December: 12–4 (home: 8–1; road: 4–3)

Game	Date	Team	Score	High points	High rebounds	High assists	Location Attendance	Record
26	December 2	Milwaukee	W 116-103	Norm Nixon (25)	Kareem Abdul-Jabbar (14)	Magic Johnson (13)	The Forum	17–9
27	December 4	@ San Antonio	W 127-121	Kareem Abdul-Jabbar (29)	Kareem Abdul-Jabbar (11)	Johnson & Wilkes (9)	HemisFair Arena	18–9
28	December 5	@ Houston	W 116-114	Norm Nixon (26)	Kareem Abdul-Jabbar (15)	Norm Nixon (10)	The Summit	19–9
29	December 7	San Diego	L 108-116	Magic Johnson (31)	Magic Johnson (13)	Norm Nixon (11)	The Forum	19–10
30	December 9	Denver	W 131-118	Kareem Abdul-Jabbar (31)	Abdul-Jabbar & Chones (9)	Magic Johnson (11)	The Forum	20–10
31	December 14	Detroit	W 138-122	Kareem Abdul-Jabbar (31)	Kareem Abdul-Jabbar (11)	Magic Johnson (9)	The Forum	21–10
32	December 16	San Antonio	W 121-119	Nixon & Wilkes (27)	Jim Chones (11)	Norm Nixon (9)	The Forum	22–10
33	December 18	@ Chicago	W 129-118	Kareem Abdul-Jabbar (39)	Kareem Abdul-Jabbar (16)	Magic Johnson (13)	Chicago Stadium	23–10
34	December 19	@ Atlanta	L 112-119	Kareem Abdul-Jabbar (29)	Abdul-Jabbar & Chones (8)	Norm Nixon (10)	Omni Coliseum	23–11
35	December 21	Golden State	W 114-108	Kareem Abdul-Jabbar (29)	Kareem Abdul-Jabbar (8)	Magic Johnson (10)	The Forum	24–11
36	December 22	@ Denver	L 128-130	Jamaal Wilkes (24)	Jim Chones (8)	Magic Johnson (9)	McNichols Sports Arena	24–12
37	December 23	Seattle	W 102-97	Kareem Abdul-Jabbar (32)	Kareem Abdul-Jabbar (14)	Magic Johnson (10)	The Forum	25–12
38	December 26	@ Kansas City	L 111-118	Johnson & Wilkes (24)	Kareem Abdul-Jabbar (15)	Kareem Abdul-Jabbar (9)	Municipal Auditorium	25–13
39	December 27	@ Utah	W 124-116	Kareem Abdul-Jabbar (31)	Kareem Abdul-Jabbar (10)	Magic Johnson (11)	Salt Palace	26–13
40	December 28	Boston	W 123-105	Magic Johnson (23)	Kareem Abdul-Jabbar (18)	Norm Nixon (8)	The Forum; 17,505	27–13
41	December 30	Phoenix	W 113-105	Jamaal Wilkes (30)	Kareem Abdul-Jabbar (14)	Norm Nixon (8)	The Forum	28–13

January: 10–4 (home: 5–0; road: 5–4)

Game	Date	Team	Score	High points	High rebounds	High assists	Location Attendance	Record
42	January 2	@ Indiana	W 127-120	Kareem Abdul-Jabbar (32)	Abdul-Jabbar & Haywood (7)	Jamaal Wilkes (8)	Market Square Arena	29–13
43	January 6	@ Milwaukee	L 103-113	Jamaal Wilkes (24)	Kareem Abdul-Jabbar (12)	Norm Nixon (8)	MECCA Arena	29–14
44	January 9	@ Washington	L 101-103	Kareem Abdul-Jabbar (24)	Kareem Abdul-Jabbar (11)	Norm Nixon (6)	Capital Centre	29–15
45	January 11	@ Detroit	W 123-100	Jamaal Wilkes (27)	Kareem Abdul-Jabbar (14)	Magic Johnson (7)	Pontiac Silverdome	30–15
46	January 13	@ Boston	W 100-98	Kareem Abdul-Jabbar (33)	Kareem Abdul-Jabbar (12)	Norm Nixon (9)	Boston Garden	31–15
47	January 15	Utah	W 112-99	Kareem Abdul-Jabbar (24)	Jamaal Wilkes (10)	Kareem Abdul-Jabbar (7)	The Forum	32–15
48	January 16	@ Golden State	W 97-96	Jamaal Wilkes (27)	Spencer Haywood (11)	Norm Nixon (9)	Oakland-Alameda County Coliseum Arena	33–15
49	January 18	Atlanta	W 108-102	Kareem Abdul-Jabbar (28)	Kareem Abdul-Jabbar (15)	Norm Nixon (12)	The Forum	34–15
50	January 21	New York	W 132-114	Kareem Abdul-Jabbar (25)	Kareem Abdul-Jabbar (14)	Norm Nixon (9)	The Forum	35–15
51	January 24	@ Portland	L 103-111	Kareem Abdul-Jabbar (30)	Kareem Abdul-Jabbar (16)	Norm Nixon (7)	Memorial Coliseum	35–16
52	January 25	Philadelphia	W 124-103	Jamaal Wilkes (30)	Michael Cooper (13)	Norm Nixon (11)	The Forum	36–16
53	January 27	Milwaukee	W 112-102	Magic Johnson (25)	Jim Chones (12)	Norm Nixon (8)	The Forum	37–16
54	January 29	@ Cleveland	L 153-154 (4 OT)	Kareem Abdul-Jabbar (42)	Kareem Abdul-Jabbar (17)	Magic Johnson (8)	Richfield Coliseum	37–17
55	January 31	@ Chicago	W 107-97	Jamaal Wilkes (28)	Jim Chones (12)	Magic Johnson (11)	Chicago Stadium	38–17

February: 9–2 (home: 5–1; road: 4–1)

Game	Date	Team	Score	High points	High rebounds	High assists	Location Attendance	Record
All-Star Break
56	February 5	@ New York	W 116-105	Kareem Abdul-Jabbar (22)	Kareem Abdul-Jabbar (17)	Magic Johnson (11)	Madison Square Garden	39–17
57	February 8	@ New Jersey	W 125-120 (OT)	Kareem Abdul-Jabbar (31)	Magic Johnson (13)	Johnson & Nixon (13)	Rutgers Athletic Center	40–17
58	February 10	@ Philadelphia	L 104-105	Kareem Abdul-Jabbar (38)	Jamaal Wilkes (8)	Norm Nixon (10)	The Spectrum	40–18
59	February 13	Portland	W 129-100	Kareem Abdul-Jabbar (32)	Magic Johnson (9)	Kareem Abdul-Jabbar (11)	The Forum	41–18
60	February 15	Kansas City	W 114-100	Kareem Abdul-Jabbar (26)	Jamaal Wilkes (10)	Norm Nixon (10)	The Forum	42–18
61	February 17	Washington	W 111-107	Kareem Abdul-Jabbar (25)	Magic Johnson (12)	Norm Nixon (9)	The Forum	43–18
62	February 20	@ Denver	W 116-103	Magic Johnson (30)	Magic Johnson (12)	Norm Nixon (6)	McNichols Sports Arena	44–18
63	February 22	New Jersey	W 132-110	Kareem Abdul-Jabbar (22)	Abdul-Jabbar & Chones (14)	Norm Nixon (7)	The Forum	45–18
64	February 24	Houston	W 112-100	Jamaal Wilkes (29)	Magic Johnson (8)	Norm Nixon (11)	The Forum	46–18
65	February 26	Seattle	W 131-108	Kareem Abdul-Jabbar (31)	Abdul-Jabbar & Wilkes (11)	Magic Johnson (13)	The Forum	47–18
66	February 29	Milwaukee	L 117-126 (OT)	Norm Nixon (30)	3 players tied (11)	Norm Nixon (13)	The Forum	47–19

March: 13–3 (home: 7–0; road: 6–3)

Game	Date	Team	Score	High points	High rebounds	High assists	Location Attendance	Record
67	March 2	@ Phoenix	L 115-123	Kareem Abdul-Jabbar (26)	Kareem Abdul-Jabbar (13)	Norm Nixon (9)	Arizona Veterans Memorial Coliseum	47–20
68	March 4	@ Milwaukee	W 127-124	Kareem Abdul-Jabbar (28)	Kareem Abdul-Jabbar (10)	Norm Nixon (11)	MECCA Arena	48–20
69	March 5	@ Kansas City	W 117-101	Magic Johnson (28)	Magic Johnson (16)	Kareem Abdul-Jabbar (7)	Kemper Arena	49–20
70	March 7	Chicago	W 101-99	Kareem Abdul-Jabbar (31)	Magic Johnson (18)	Magic Johnson (9)	The Forum	50–20
71	March 9	@ Portland	L 121-142	Kareem Abdul-Jabbar (26)	Magic Johnson (12)	Magic Johnson (8)	Memorial Coliseum	50–21
72	March 11	@ San Diego	W 123-106	Kareem Abdul-Jabbar (28)	Abdul-Jabbar & Johnson (12)	Magic Johnson (8)	San Diego Sports Arena	51–21
73	March 12	Portland	W 102-94	Kareem Abdul-Jabbar (30)	Magic Johnson (16)	Norm Nixon (9)	The Forum	52–21
74	March 14	Denver	W 132-126	Jamaal Wilkes (27)	Mark Landsberger (16)	Michael Cooper (8)	The Forum	53–21
75	March 16	Phoenix	W 128-106	Kareem Abdul-Jabbar (30)	Magic Johnson (13)	Magic Johnson (13)	The Forum	54–21
76	March 18	Golden State	W 118-100	Kareem Abdul-Jabbar (23)	Jamaal Wilkes (11)	Norm Nixon (8)	The Forum	55–21
77	March 19	@ Phoenix	L 108-112	Kareem Abdul-Jabbar (29)	Kareem Abdul-Jabbar (14)	Norm Nixon (9)	Arizona Veterans Memorial Coliseum	55–22
78	March 22	@ Seattle	W 97-92	Norm Nixon (23)	Kareem Abdul-Jabbar (9)	Norm Nixon (10)	Kingdome	56–22
79	March 23	Utah	W 101-96	Jamaal Wilkes (22)	Jamaal Wilkes (11)	Norm Nixon (12)	The Forum	57–22
80	March 27	@ Utah	W 97-95	Jamaal Wilkes (21)	Abdul-Jabbar & Johnson (11)	Norm Nixon (7)	Salt Palace	58–22
81	March 28	San Diego	W 126-88	Magic Johnson (22)	Mark Landsberger (10)	3 players tied (5)	The Forum	59–22
82	March 30	@ Golden State	W 95-93	Norm Nixon (18)	Magic Johnson (12)	Magic Johnson (10)	Oakland-Alameda County Coliseum Arena	60–22

1979–80 schedule

=== Playoffs ===
1980 playoff game log
Total: 12–4 (Home: 7–2; Road: 5–2)
Conference Semifinals: 4–1 (home: 3–0; road: 1–1)

Game	Date	Team	Score	High points	High rebounds	High assists	Location Attendance	Series
1	April 8	Phoenix	W 119–110	Kareem Abdul-Jabbar (30)	Abdul-Jabbar & Johnson (12)	Magic Johnson (16)	The Forum; 15,892	1–0
2	April 9	Phoenix	W 131–128 (OT)	Kareem Abdul-Jabbar (32)	Magic Johnson (13)	Norm Nixon (12)	The Forum; 14,286	2–0
3	April 11	@ Phoenix	W 108–105	Kareem Abdul-Jabbar (37)	Magic Johnson (13)	Norm Nixon (8)	Arizona Veterans Memorial Coliseum; 12,660	3–0
4	April 13	@ Phoenix	L 101–127	Kareem Abdul-Jabbar (25)	Kareem Abdul-Jabbar (11)	Magic Johnson (13)	Arizona Veterans Memorial Coliseum; 12,660	3–1
5	April 15	Phoenix	W 126–101	Kareem Abdul-Jabbar (35)	Kareem Abdul-Jabbar (16)	Norm Nixon (13)	The Forum; 17,505	4–1

Conference Finals: 4–1 (home: 2–1; road: 2–0)

Game	Date	Team	Score	High points	High rebounds	High assists	Location Attendance	Series
1	April 22	Seattle	L 107–108	Kareem Abdul-Jabbar (26)	3 players tied (8)	Norm Nixon (11)	The Forum; 17,505	0–1
2	April 23	Seattle	W 108–99	Kareem Abdul-Jabbar (31)	Kareem Abdul-Jabbar (16)	Norm Nixon (12)	The Forum; 17,505	1–1
3	April 25	@ Seattle	W 104–100	Kareem Abdul-Jabbar (33)	Kareem Abdul-Jabbar (13)	Cooper & Johnson (10)	Hec Edmundson Pavilion; 8,524	2–1
4	April 27	@ Seattle	W 98–93	Kareem Abdul-Jabbar (25)	Johnson & Wilkes (13)	Norm Nixon (8)	Hec Edmundson Pavilion; 8,524	3–1
5	April 30	Seattle	W 111–105	Kareem Abdul-Jabbar (38)	Kareem Abdul-Jabbar (11)	Magic Johnson (10)	The Forum; 17,505	4–1

NBA Finals: 4–2 (home: 2–1; road: 2–1)

Game	Date	Team	Score	High points	High rebounds	High assists	Location Attendance	Series
1	May 4	Philadelphia	W 109–102	Kareem Abdul-Jabbar (33)	Kareem Abdul-Jabbar (14)	Magic Johnson (10)	The Forum; 17,505	1–0
2	May 7	Philadelphia	L 104–107	Kareem Abdul-Jabbar (38)	Kareem Abdul-Jabbar (14)	Magic Johnson (11)	The Forum; 17,505	1–1
3	May 10	@ Philadelphia	W 111–101	Kareem Abdul-Jabbar (33)	Kareem Abdul-Jabbar (14)	Norm Nixon (7)	The Spectrum; 18,726	2–1
4	May 11	@ Philadelphia	L 102–105	Magic Johnson (28)	Kareem Abdul-Jabbar (11)	Magic Johnson (9)	The Spectrum; 18,726	2–2
5	May 14	Philadelphia	W 108–103	Kareem Abdul-Jabbar (40)	Abdul-Jabbar & Johnson (15)	Magic Johnson (10)	The Forum; 17,505	3–2
6	May 16	@ Philadelphia	W 123–107	Magic Johnson (42)	Magic Johnson (15)	Norm Nixon (9)	The Spectrum; 18,726	4–2

1980 schedule

== Magic Johnson ==
Magic Johnson and Kareem Abdul–Jabbar at the start of the season

Having won everything possible at the college level, Johnson decided to leave college two years early and declared himself eligible for the 1979 NBA draft. The New Orleans Jazz originally had the first draft pick, but they had traded the pick to the Los Angeles Lakers in exchange for NBA star Gail Goodrich. As a result, the Lakers drafted Johnson with the first overall pick, signing him for a sizable salary of US$600,000 a year.

Johnson joined a franchise which had gone through major changes. The Lakers featured a new coach in Jack McKinney, a new owner in Jerry Buss, and several new players. However, Johnson was most excited about the prospect of playing with his personal idol, the 7'2" center Kareem Abdul-Jabbar, who would go on to become the second leading scorer in NBA history. From the first game, Johnson displayed his trademark enthusiasm for the game. When Abdul-Jabbar hit a last-second free throw line hook shot to win against the San Diego Clippers, Johnson ran around the court, high-fiving and hugging everybody, causing concern that the "Buck" (as Johnson was called by Lakers announcer Chick Hearn for his youth) would burn himself out.

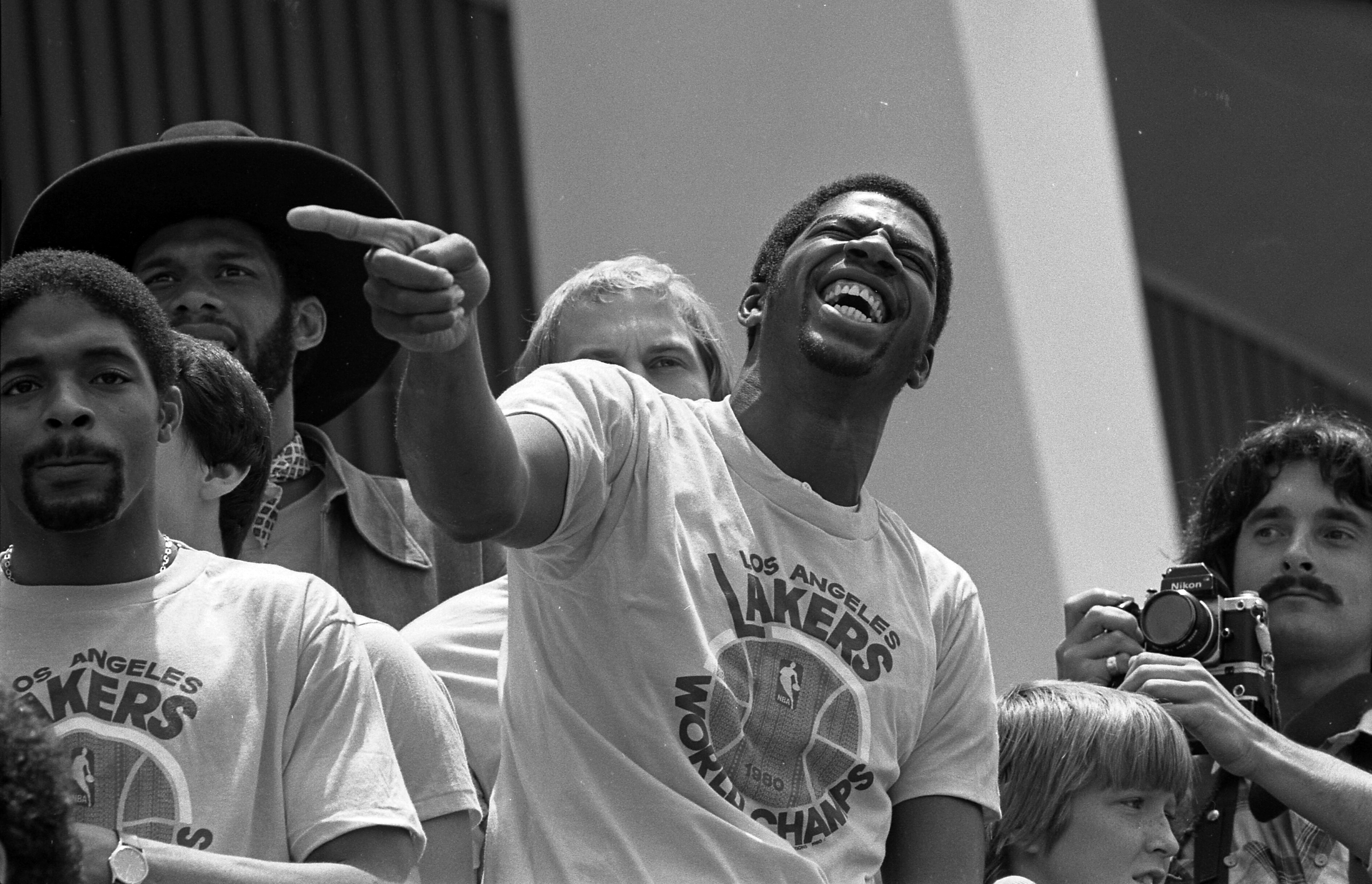
Magic Johnson at the Lakers championship rally, May 1980

However, in that 1979–80 NBA season, the rookie proved them wrong. Johnson introduced an uptempo style of basketball which the NBA described as a mix of "no-look passes off the fastbreak, pinpoint alley-oops from halfcourt, spinning feeds and overhand bullets under the basket through triple teams". Fellow Lakers guard Michael Cooper even stated that: "There have been times when he [Johnson] has thrown passes and I wasn't sure where he was going. Then one of our guys catches the ball and scores, and I run back up the floor convinced that he must've thrown it through somebody." This style of basketball became known as "Showtime". Given Johnson was also a prolific scorer and rebounder, he soon led the league in triple-doubles, racking up 10-points-10-rebounds-10-assists games in a rate only second to NBA Hall-of-Famer Oscar Robertson. In addition, he expressed a raw, childlike enthusiasm which further endeared him to the fans.

Johnson's average of 18.0 points, 7.7 rebounds and 7.3 assists per game was enough to make the All-Rookie Team and become a starter on the All-Star Team, even though the NBA Rookie of the Year Award went to his rival Larry Bird, who had joined the Boston Celtics. The Lakers compiled a 60–22 win–loss record, and with Paul Westhead replacing coach McKinney as a coach after a serious bicycle accident 13 games into the season, the Lakers reached the 1980 NBA Finals against the Philadelphia 76ers. Against the fierce resistance of Sixers Hall-of-Fame forward Julius "Doctor J" Erving and Darryl Dawkins, the Lakers took a 3–2 lead before Abdul-Jabbar went down with a sprained ankle. Coach Westhead decided to put point guard Johnson at pivot instead, and on the Sixers' home court, the rookie dominated with 42 points, 15 rebounds, seven assists and three steals, lifting the Lakers to a 123–107 win and winning the NBA Finals MVP award. The NBA regards Johnson's clutch performance as one of the finest individual games ever. Although only twenty years old, he had already won every trophy at the high school, college and professional levels. Johnson also became one of only four players to win NCAA and NBA championships in consecutive years.

== Player statistics ==
=== Regular season ===
Player	GP	MPG	FG%	3FG%	FT%	RPG	APG	SPG	BPG	PPG
Kareem Abdul-Jabbar	82	38.3	.604	.000	.765	10.8	4.5	1.0	3.4	24.8
Ron Boone†	6	17.7	.350	NA	.857	1.8	1.2	0.8	0.0	5.7
Marty Byrnes	32	6.1	.500	NA	.867	0.8	0.4	0.2	0.0	2.0
Kenny Carr†	6	17.7	.438	NA	1.000	3.4	0.2	0.4	0.2	3.2
Jim Chones	82	29.2	.489	.000	.740	6.9	1.8	0.7	0.8	10.6
Michael Cooper	82	24.1	.524	.250	.776	2.8	2.7	1.0	0.5	8.8
Don Ford†	52	11.2	.508	.000	.821	1.9	0.7	0.2	0.3	3.0
Spencer Haywood	76	20.3	.487	.250	.772	4.6	1.2	0.5	0.8	9.7
Brad Holland	38	5.2	.423	.200	.938	0.4	0.6	0.4	0.0	2.8
Magic Johnson	77	36.3	.530	.226	.810	7.7	7.3	2.4	0.5	18.0
Mark Landsberger*	23	16.3	.482	NA	.518	7.1	0.6	0.4	0.2	7.0
Butch Lee*	11	2.8	.308	NA	.857	0.7	0.8	0.1	0.0	1.3
Ollie Mack†	27	5.7	.420	.000	.500	0.8	0.7	0.1	0.0	1.9
Norm Nixon	82	39.3	.516	.125	.779	2.8	7.8	1.8	0.2	17.6
Jamaal Wilkes	82	37.9	.535	.176	.808	6.4	3.0	1.6	0.3	20.0

*Stats after being traded to the Lakers.
†Stats before being traded from the Lakers.

=== Playoffs ===
Player	GP	MPG	FG%	3FG%	FT%	RPG	APG	SPG	BPG	PPG
Kareem Abdul-Jabbar	15	41.2	.572	NA	.790	12.1	3.1	1.1	3.9	31.9
Marty Byrnes	4	2.0	.333	NA	.667	0.3	0.3	0.0	0.0	1.5
Jim Chones	16	27.4	.407	NA	.676	6.5	1.8	0.5	0.4	7.4
Michael Cooper	16	29.0	.407	.000	.861	3.7	3.6	1.5	0.7	9.1
Spencer Haywood	11	13.2	.472	.000	.813	2.4	0.4	0.0	0.5	5.7
Brad Holland	9	3.6	.500	.000	1.000	0.6	0.3	0.6	0.0	1.6
Magic Johnson	16	41.1	.518	.250	.802	10.5	9.4	3.0	0.4	18.3
Mark Landsberger	16	12.2	.362	.000	.833	4.3	0.1	0.2	0.1	3.4
Butch Lee	3	2.0	NA	NA	1.000	0.3	0.0	0.0	0.0	0.7
Norm Nixon	16	40.5	.477	.200	.804	3.5	7.8	2.0	0.2	16.9
Jamaal Wilkes	16	40.8	.535	.176	.815	8.0	3.0	1.5	0.3	20.3

== Awards and records ==
- Kareem Abdul-Jabbar, NBA Most Valuable Player Award
- Magic Johnson, NBA Finals Most Valuable Player Award
- Kareem Abdul-Jabbar, All-NBA First Team
- Kareem Abdul-Jabbar, NBA All-Defensive First Team
- Kareem Abdul-Jabbar, NBA All-Star Game
- Magic Johnson, NBA All-Star Game
- Magic Johnson, NBA All-Rookie Team 1st Team
