= Spencer Haywood =

American basketball player (born 1949)

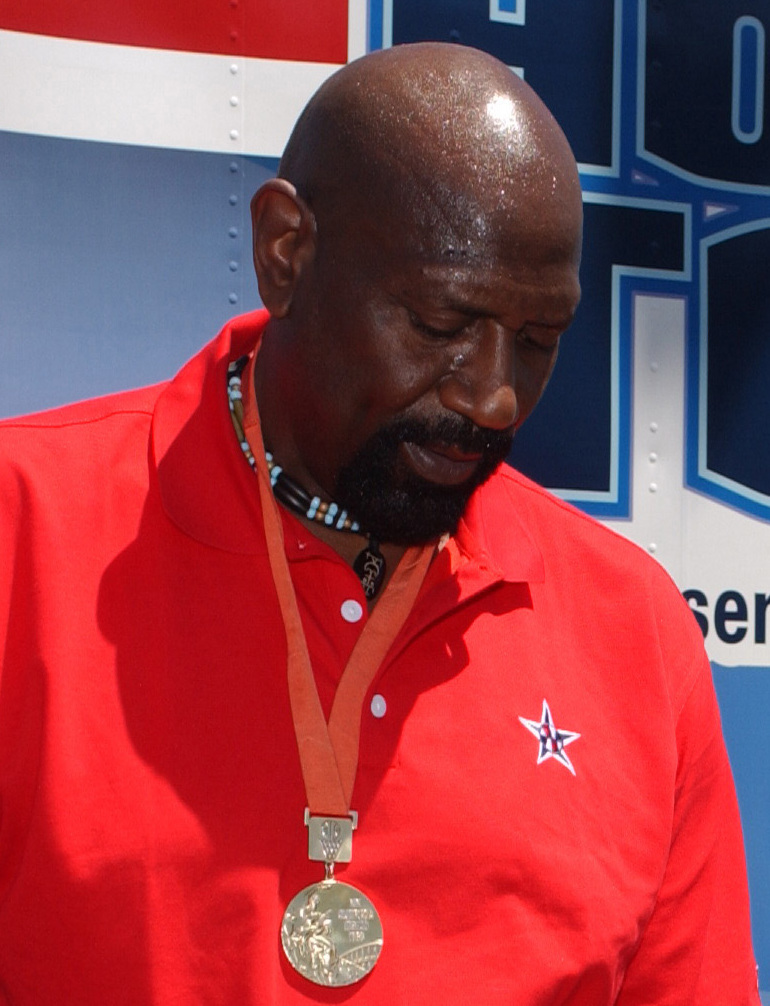
- Haywood at Nellis Air Force Base in 2006

Personal information
- Born: April 22, 1949 (age 77) Silver City, Mississippi, U.S.
- Listed height: 6 ft 8 in (2.03 m)
- Listed weight: 225 lb (102 kg)

Career information
- High school: Pershing (Detroit, Michigan)
- College: Trinidad State (1967–1968); Detroit Mercy (1968–1969)
- NBA draft: 1971: 2nd round, 30th overall pick
- Drafted by: Buffalo Braves
- Playing career: 1969–1983
- Position: Power forward
- Number: 24, 42, 31

Career history
- 1969–1970: Denver Rockets
- 1970–1975: Seattle SuperSonics
- 1975–1979: New York Knicks
- 1979: New Orleans Jazz
- 1979–1980: Los Angeles Lakers
- 1980–1981: Reyer Venezia
- 1981–1983: Washington Bullets

Career highlights
- NBA champion (1980); ABA Most Valuable Player (1970); 4× NBA All-Star (1972–1975); ABA All-Star (1970); ABA All-Star Game MVP (1970); 2× All-NBA First Team (1972, 1973); All-ABA First Team (1970); 2× All-NBA Second Team (1974, 1975); ABA Rookie of the Year (1970); ABA All-Rookie Team (1970); ABA scoring champion (1970); ABA rebounding leader (1970); ABA All-Time Team; No. 24 retired by Seattle SuperSonics; Consensus first-team All-American (1969); No. 45 retired by Detroit Mercy Titans; NCAA rebounding leader (1969); Mr. Basketball USA (1967); Third-team Parade All-American (1967)

Career ABA and NBA statistics
- Points: 17,111 (20.3 ppg)
- Rebounds: 8,675 (10.3 rpg)
- Assists: 1,541 (1.8 apg)
- Stats at NBA.com
- Stats at Basketball Reference
- Basketball Hall of Fame
Medals
Men's basketball
Representing United States
Olympic Games
Gold medal – first place	1968 Mexico City	Team competition

Spencer Haywood (born April 22, 1949) is an American former professional basketball player and Olympic gold medalist. Haywood is a member of the Naismith Memorial Basketball Hall of Fame, being inducted in 2015.

== Early life ==
Haywood was born on April 22, 1949, in Silver City, Mississippi. His father died three months before he was born. He had 10 brothers and sisters and grew up in poverty on the Mississippi delta where his family worked as sharecroppers. He was born at home with a midwife, and never received a birth certificate, his name being written in a family bible to record his birth. At the age of 13, he was the main source of income for his family, earning as little as $2 a day picking cotton. He worked from sunrise to sunset, under supervision of the landowner's overseer. At the age of 14, he spent a night in jail after being falsely charged with threatening to kill a white man. Fearing for his well-being, Haywood's mother sent him to live with his brother in Chicago.

In 1964, Haywood moved to Detroit, Michigan where he lived with his brother, residing in the Krainz Woods neighborhood. He attended Pershing High School, playing under coach Will Robinson. In 1966, age 16, at 6 ft, 7 in (2.01 m) and 220 pounds (99.8 kg), he averaged 29 points and 17 rebounds per game for Pershing's basketball team, and was named All-State in basketball. As a senior in 1967, now 6 ft, 8 in (2.03 m) tall, Haywood averaged a quadruple double per game: 25.4 points, 13 rebounds, 14 assists, and 12 blocked shots. He led the team to the state championship, winning the championship game 90–66. It is considered one of the great teams in Michigan high school basketball history; and not only included Haywood, but also future American Basketball Association five-time All-Star Ralph Simpson.

== College career and Olympics ==
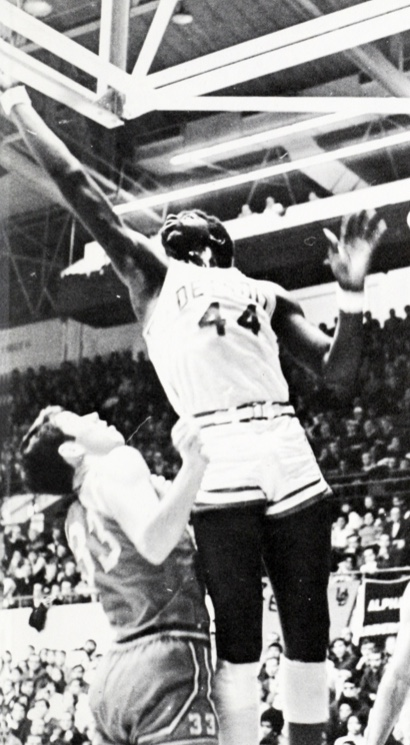
Haywood during his season at Detroit

Haywood was originally planning to go to the University of Tennessee, but with the help of coach Robinson, instead attended Trinidad State Junior College in Trinidad, Colorado. During the 1967–68 college season, he averaged 28.2 points and 22.1 rebounds per game, and was the Junior College Player of the Year.

In 1968, many African-American college players boycotted playing in the Olympics, which gave Haywood the unusual opportunity as a freshman to make the Olympic team. Players were not simply selected to the team, but had to participate in seven days of tryout games in Albuquerque, New Mexico, held in "the Pit". Prominent college players like Pete Maravich and Calvin Murphy were cut before making the Olympic team, while Haywood, known as "the kid", was the first player chosen by coach Hank Iba. Due to his exceptional performance and talent, Haywood made the 1968 U.S. Olympic team at age 19, becoming the youngest American basketball player in Olympic history.

In the turmoil of the times, he attended a meeting before the Olympics started, that included Dr. Martin Luther King, as well as Tommie Smith, John Carlos, Lee Evans and Dr. Harry Edwards (who spearheaded the boycott effort and urged some African-American athletes to make statements during the games, though this was not expected of 19-year olds Haywood and George Foreman).

Haywood was the leading scorer on the gold medal-winning team at 16.1 points per game, and he set a Team USA field goal percentage record of .719. His record 145 points in the Olympic tournament stood until 2012 (when Kevin Durant scored 155 points; but who also had a three-point shot available unlike the 1968 games). When he arrived in Detroit after the Olympics, he was greeted at the airport by 4,000 people, including Michigan Governor George Romney.

Haywood transferred to the University of Detroit in the fall of that year, and led the NCAA in rebounding with a 22.1 average per game while scoring 32.1 points per game during the 1968–69 season. He was named an All-American. This is considered the single greatest year of any basketball player for the Titans. In 1993, Haywood was inducted into the Detroit Mercy Titans Hall of Fame. The school retired his No. 45 in 2015.

Haywood decided to turn pro after his sophomore year, but National Basketball Association (NBA) rules, which then required a player to wait until four years after his high school class graduated, prohibited him from entering the league. The American Basketball Association (ABA) had a similar rule, but league executive Mike Storen came up with the idea for a hardship exemption. With his mother raising 10 children while picking cotton at $2 per day in Mississippi, Haywood met the criteria. He joined the Denver Rockets after they selected him in the ABA draft.

== Professional career ==
=== ABA rookie season ===
In his 1969–70 rookie season, Haywood led the ABA in both scoring at 30.0 points per game and rebounding at 19.5 rebounds per game, while leading the Rockets to the ABA's Western Division title. In a game on April 15 against the Los Angeles Stars, he recorded 59 points with 25 rebounds in the victory. It was a league record for most points in one game for an entire year and Haywood, at the age of 20 years and 358 days, became the youngest player in ABA or NBA history with a 50-point/20 rebound game, a record he still holds. In the playoffs, Denver defeated the Washington Caps in seven games in the Western Division semifinals, with Haywood averaging 36.4 points and 19.7 rebounds a game before falling to the Los Angeles Stars in the division finals in five games; Haywood averaged 37 points and 19.8 rebounds per game.

Haywood was named both the ABA Rookie of the Year and ABA MVP during the season, and became the youngest ever recipient of the MVP at the age of 21. His 986 field goals made, 1,637 rebounds, and 19.5 rebound per game average are the all-time ABA records for a season. Haywood also won the ABA's 1970 All-Star Game MVP that year after recording 23 points, 19 rebounds, and 7 blocked shots for the West team.

=== NBA career and Italy ===
In 1970, despite the NBA's eligibility rules, Haywood joined the Seattle SuperSonics. To become eligible, he joined with SuperSonics owner Sam Schulman in launching an antitrust suit against the league (Haywood v. National Basketball Association). The United States District Court for the Central District of California issued a temporary injunction which allowed Haywood to begin play - a decision that was upheld in an in-chambers opinion by U.S. Supreme Court Justice Douglas. The suit and its impact on college basketball and the NBA was the focus of a 2020 book The Spencer Haywood Rule: Battles, Basketball, and the Making of an American Iconoclast, by Marc J. Spears and Gary Washburn. Shortly after the Supreme Court's opinion, the league and Haywood reached an out-of-court settlement which allowed him to stay with the Sonics permanently. After the case, the NBA revised its eligibility rules to allow for exceptions in the case of hardship. The decision allowed a significant number of high school graduates and college attendees to make themselves eligible for the NBA draft without waiting until four years after high school.

Haywood was named to the All-NBA First Team in 1972 and 1973 and the All-NBA Second Team in 1974 and 1975. Through the 2024 season, Haywood holds the following single season records for the Seattle SuperSonics/Oklahoma City Thunder franchise (The SuperSonics became the Oklahoma City Thunder prior to the 2008-09 season.): 889 2-point field goals (1972-73), 13.4 rebounds per game (1973-74), and 43.4 minutes per game (1971-72); and holds the following single season records for the Seattle SuperSonics only: 29.2 points per game (1972-73). Haywood played in four NBA All-Star Games while with Seattle (1971-75), including a strong 23-point, 11-rebound performance in 1974. He was in the top-10 NBA MVP voting twice (1971-73) and top-20 two other times (1973-75). In the 1974–75 season, the team's 8th year in the NBA, he helped lead the SuperSonics to their first playoff berth. Overall, during his five seasons with Seattle, Haywood averaged 24.9 points per game and 12.1 rebounds per game.

In October 1975, the SuperSonics traded him to the New York Knicks for $1.3 million, a first round draft pick, and Gene Short. The 1975-76 Knicks still featured Walt Frazier, Earl Monroe and Bill Bradley, but no longer had Willis Reed or Dave DeBusschere from the 1973 championship team; and even with Haywood (19.9 points and 11.3 rebounds per game), did not make the playoffs. He later teamed with Bob McAdoo, who was traded to the Knicks 20 games into the 1976-77 season, but again the Knicks missed the playoffs. McAdoo led the team in scoring and rebounding, while Haywood averaged 16.5 points and 9 rebounds a game.

Haywood played another full year for the Knicks (1977-78), making the playoffs, but he was only averaging 26.3 minutes per game and had then career lows in scoring and rebounding. He was averaging 20.9 points and 7.8 rebounds per game when the Knicks traded him to the New Orleans Jazz 34 games into the 1978-79 season for Joe Meriweather. He finished the season averaging 24 points and 9.6 rebounds per game for the Jazz, but he would never approach those numbers again.

He spent 1979-80 season with the Los Angeles Lakers (1979-80). During the late 1970s, Haywood became addicted to cocaine. He was dismissed from the Lakers by then-coach Paul Westhead during the 1980 NBA Finals for falling asleep during practice due to his addiction. He subsequently fought to overcome drug and alcohol abuse, and has worked to maintain his sobriety over the following decades.

The next season Haywood played in Italy for Reyer Venezia Mestre (then under the sponsor name "Carrera Reyer Venezia") along with Dražen Dalipagić, before returning to the NBA to play two seasons with the Washington Bullets (1981-83).

After his playing career, he became an advocate for retired ABA and NBA players to obtain health benefits and pensions; and also served as chair of the National Basketball Retired Players Association.

== Legacy and honors ==
Haywood was inducted into the Naismith Memorial Basketball Hall of Fame in September 2015. Charles Barkley played an important role in advocating for Haywood's inclusion.

The NBA honored him during the 2010 All-Star weekend in recognition of his pioneering legal efforts.

Haywood's number 24 jersey was retired by the SuperSonics during a halftime ceremony on February 26, 2007.

== ABA and NBA career statistics ==
Legend
GP	Games played	GS	Games started	MPG	Minutes per game
FG%	Field goal percentage	3P%	3-point field goal percentage	FT%	Free throw percentage
RPG	Rebounds per game	APG	Assists per game	SPG	Steals per game
BPG	Blocks per game	PPG	Points per game	**Bold**	Career high

†	Denotes seasons in which Haywood's team won an NBA championship
*	Led the league
*	ABA record

=== Regular season ===
Year	Team	GP	GS	MPG	FG%	3P%	FT%	RPG	APG	SPG	BPG	PPG
1969–70	Denver (ABA)	**84***	—	**45.3***	.493	.000	.776	**19.5***	2.3	—	—	**30.0***
1970–71	Seattle (NBA)	33	—	35.2	.449	—	.734	12.0	1.5	—	—	20.6
1971–72	Seattle (NBA)	73	—	43.4	.461	—	.819	12.7	2.0	—	—	26.2
1972–73	Seattle (NBA)	77	—	42.3	.476	—	.839	12.9	2.5	—	—	29.2
1973–74	Seattle (NBA)	75	—	40.5	.457	—	.814	13.4	**3.2**	0.9	1.4	23.5
1974–75	Seattle (NBA)	68	—	37.2	.459	—	.811	9.3	2.0	0.8	1.6	22.4
1975–76	New York (NBA)	78	—	37.1	.445	—	.757	11.3	1.2	0.7	1.0	19.9
1976–77	New York	31	—	32.9	.450	—	.832	9.0	1.6	0.5	0.9	16.5
1977–78	New York	67	—	26.3	.484	—	.711	6.6	1.9	0.6	1.1	13.7
1978–79	New York	34	—	30.1	.489	—	.733	6.1	1.6	0.3	0.9	17.8
1978–79	New Orleans	34	—	39.4	**.497**	—	**.849**	9.6	2.1	0.9	1.6	24.0
1979–80†	L.A. Lakers	76	—	20.3	.487	**.250**	.772	4.6	1.2	0.5	0.8	9.7
1981–82	Washington	76	63	27.4	.476	.000	.842	5.6	0.8	0.6	0.9	13.3
1982–83	Washington	38	25	20.4	.401	.000	.724	4.8	0.8	0.3	0.7	8.2
Career		844	88	34.8	.469	.051	.796	10.3	1.8	0.6	1.1	20.3
All-Star		5	4	27.2	.462	—	.846	10.0	1.6	0.0	0.4	14.2

=== Playoffs ===
Year	Team	GP	GS	MPG	FG%	3P%	FT%	RPG	APG	SPG	BPG	PPG
1970	Denver (ABA)	12	—	**47.3**	.511	.200	.831	**19.8**	**3.3**	—	—	**36.7**
1975	Seattle (NBA)	9	—	37.4	.359	—	.770	9.0	2.0	0.8	1.2	15.7
1978	New York	6	—	29.5	.506	—	**1.000**	7.0	2.0	0.3	0.8	16.2
1980†	L.A. Lakers	11	—	13.2	.472	.000	.813	2.4	0.4	0.0	0.5	5.7
1982	Washington	7	—	33.0	.496	—	.743	5.6	1.0	0.6	2.0	20.0
Career		45	—	32.4	.479	.167	.806	9.4	1.8	0.4	1.1	19.6

== Personal life ==
Haywood currently resides in Las Vegas. He married fashion model Iman in 1977. Their daughter, Zulekha, was born the following year. The marriage ended in divorce in 1987. Haywood remarried in 1990, to Linda (Fay); they were together until her death in 2022. Together, they had three daughters: Courtney Nikkiah, Shaakira, and Isis Chanel. As of early 2024, Haywood had three grandchildren: two grandsons from two of his younger daughters, and a granddaughter from Zulekha named Lavina.

Haywood was lifelong friends with Lonnie Lynn, his teammate on the Denver Rockets, until Lynn's death in 2014. He is the godfather of Lynn's son, rapper Common.

Haywood is a huge fan of jazz and has hosted weekly two-hour weekend jazz shows in Seattle (1971–1975, KYAC) and New York (1976–1978, WRVR).

Haywood was featured in the first season of the HBO show, Winning Time: The Rise of the Lakers Dynasty, where he was portrayed by actor Wood Harris.

== See also ==
- List of NCAA Division I men's basketball season rebounding leaders
- Haywood v. National Basketball Association
