= Marty Byrnes =

American basketball player (born 1956)

Personal information
- Born: April 30, 1956 (age 70) Syracuse, New York, U.S.
- Listed height: 6 ft 7 in (2.01 m)
- Listed weight: 215 lb (98 kg)

Career information
- High school: Pittsford Sutherland (Pittsford, New York)
- College: Syracuse (1974–1978)
- NBA draft: 1978: 1st round, 19th overall pick
- Drafted by: Phoenix Suns
- Playing career: 1978–1988
- Position: Small forward
- Number: 45, 12, 7, 45, 11

Career history
- 1978–1979: Phoenix Suns
- 1979: New Orleans Jazz
- 1979–1980: Los Angeles Lakers
- 1980–1981: Dallas Mavericks
- 1981–1982: Rochester Zeniths
- 1982–1983: Indiana Pacers
- 1983–1984: Scaligera Verona
- 1984–1986: Libertas Brindisi
- 1986–1987: Dietor Bologna
- 1987–1988: Charleston Gunners

Career highlights
- NBA champion (1980)

Career NBA statistics
- Points: 1,495 (5.7 ppg)
- Rebounds: 586 (2.2 rpg)
- Assists: 409 (1.6 apg)
- Stats at NBA.com
- Stats at Basketball Reference

Martin William Byrnes (born April 30, 1956) is an American former professional basketball player.

Born in Syracuse, New York, a 6'7" small forward from Syracuse University, Byrnes played four seasons (1978–1981; 1982–1983) in the National Basketball Association (NBA) as a member of the Phoenix Suns, New Orleans Jazz, Los Angeles Lakers, Dallas Mavericks, and Indiana Pacers. He averaged 5.7 points per game in his NBA career and won an NBA Championship with the Lakers in 1980.

== Career statistics ==
Legend
GP	Games played	GS	Games started	MPG	Minutes per game
FG%	Field goal percentage	3P%	3-point field goal percentage	FT%	Free throw percentage
RPG	Rebounds per game	APG	Assists per game	SPG	Steals per game
BPG	Blocks per game	PPG	Points per game	**Bold**	Career high
†	Won an NBA championship

=== NBA ===
==== Regular season ====
Year	Team	GP	GS	MPG	FG%	3P%	FT%	RPG	APG	SPG	BPG	PPG
1978–79	Phoenix	43		17.1	.489		.730	2.3	1.4	.3	.0	6.8
1978–79	New Orleans	36		14.7	.470		.611	**2.6**	1.2	.3	**.2**	5.3
1979–80†	L.A. Lakers	32		6.1	**.500**	–	**.867**	.8	.4	.2	.0	2.0
1980–81	Dallas	72		**18.9**	.479	**.450**	.764	2.5	1.6	.4	**.2**	**7.8**
1982–83	Indiana	**80**	12	18.0	.420	.231	.747	2.4	**2.2**	**.5**	.1	4.9
Career		263	12	16.2	.463	.326	.736	2.2	1.6	.4	.1	5.7

==== Playoffs ====
Year	Team	GP	MPG	FG%	3P%	FT%	RPG	APG	SPG	BPG	PPG
1980†	L.A. Lakers	4	2.0	.333	–	.667	.3	.3	.0	.0	1.5
