= Darryl Dawkins =

American basketball player-coach (1957–2015)

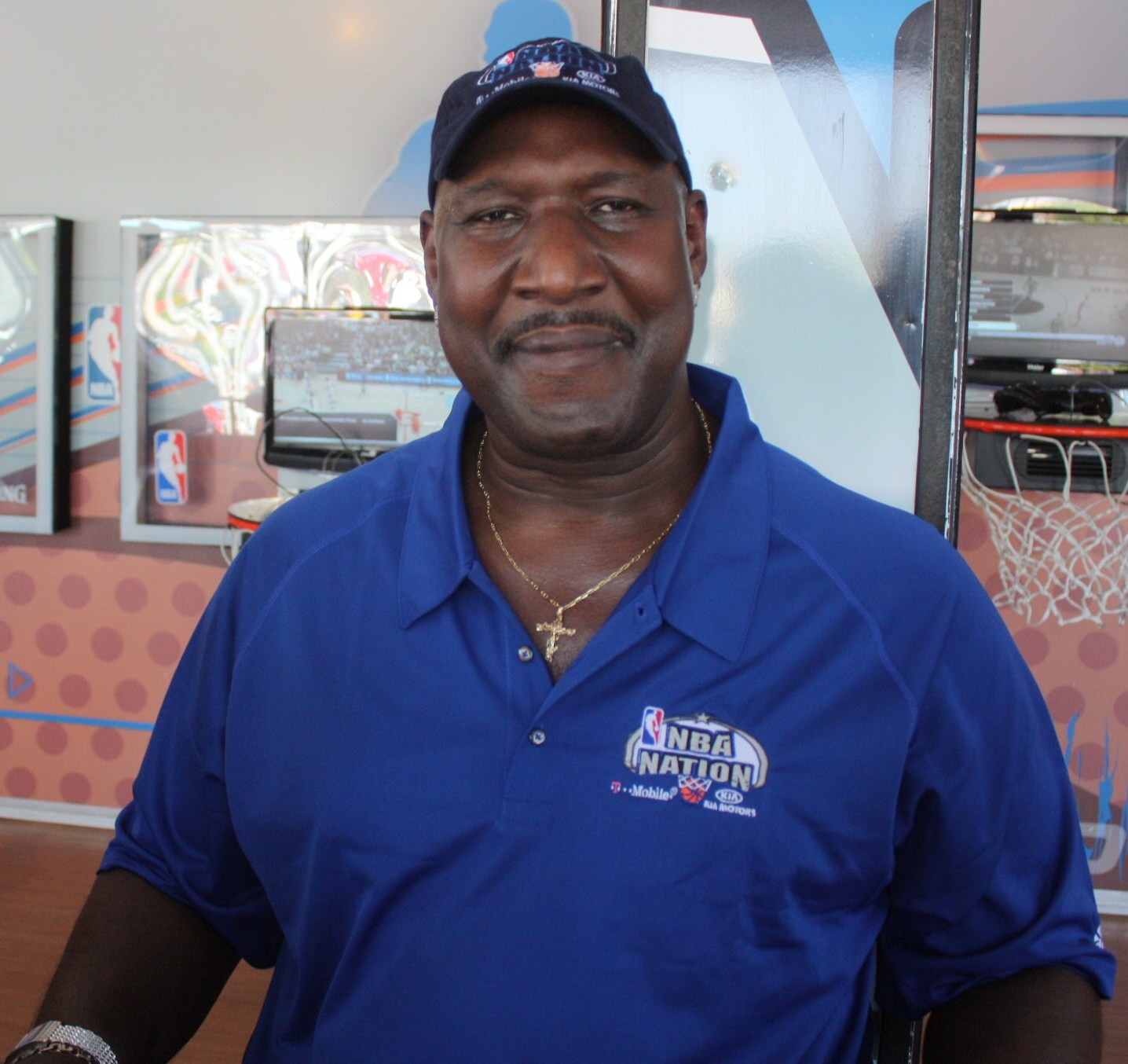
- Dawkins in 2009

Personal information
- Born: January 11, 1957 Orlando, Florida, U.S.
- Died: August 27, 2015 (aged 58) Allentown, Pennsylvania, U.S.
- Listed height: 6 ft 11 in (2.11 m)
- Listed weight: 251 lb (114 kg)

Career information
- High school: Maynard Evans (Orlando, Florida)
- NBA draft: 1975: 1st round, 5th overall pick
- Drafted by: Philadelphia 76ers
- Playing career: 1975–1996, 1999–2000
- Position: Center
- Number: 53, 45, 50
- Coaching career: 1998–2006, 2009–2011

Career history

Playing
- 1975–1982: Philadelphia 76ers
- 1982–1987: New Jersey Nets
- 1987: Utah Jazz
- 1987–1989: Detroit Pistons
- 1989–1991: Auxilium Torino
- 1991–1992: Philips Milano
- 1992–1994: Libertas Forlì
- 1995: Harlem Globetrotters
- 1995–1996: Sioux Falls Skyforce
- 1999–2000: Winnipeg Cyclone
- 2000: Pennsylvania ValleyDawgs

Career highlights
- As player: Fourth-team Parade All-American (1974); First-team Parade All-American (1975); 2× Italian All-Star Game (1991, 1992); No. 11 retired by Auxilium Torino; As coach: 2× USBL champion (2001, 2004); IBA Coach of the Year (1999); USBL Coach of the Year (1999)

Career NBA statistics
- Points: 8,733 (12.0 ppg)
- Rebounds: 4,432 (6.1 rpg)
- Blocks: 1,023 (1.4 bpg)
- Stats at NBA.com
- Stats at Basketball Reference

Darryl R. Dawkins (January 11, 1957 – August 27, 2015) was an American professional basketball player and coach. A three-time NBA finalist center, he most notably played for the Philadelphia 76ers and New Jersey Nets with brief tenures at the Utah Jazz and Detroit Pistons later on. His powerful dunks, which shattered two backboards in 1979, led the NBA to adopt breakaway rims.

Dawkins averaged double figures in scoring nine times in his 14-year NBA career, often ranking among the league leaders in field-goal percentage, and set an NBA record for fouls in a season (386) in 1983–84. Stevie Wonder gave him the nickname Chocolate Thunder.

== Early life and high school ==
Dawkins was born in Orlando, Florida on January 11, 1957 to Harriet James and Frank Dawkins. His grandmother, Amanda Celestine Jones, was fond of the young Darryl and personally raised him. As a 6 ft 10 in (2.08 m) senior at Maynard Evans High School, he averaged 32 points and 21 rebounds to lead his team to the state championship, garnering the attention of many Division I colleges across the country.

== NBA career ==
Having previously considered Florida State, Kansas, and Kentucky as potential destinations should he enter the NCAA stage, Dawkins opted to directly enter the NBA draft out of high school instead of attending college. He made this decision because he wanted to make enough money to help his family escape poverty. He was the first player to be drafted by the NBA immediately after high school.

=== Philadelphia 76ers ===
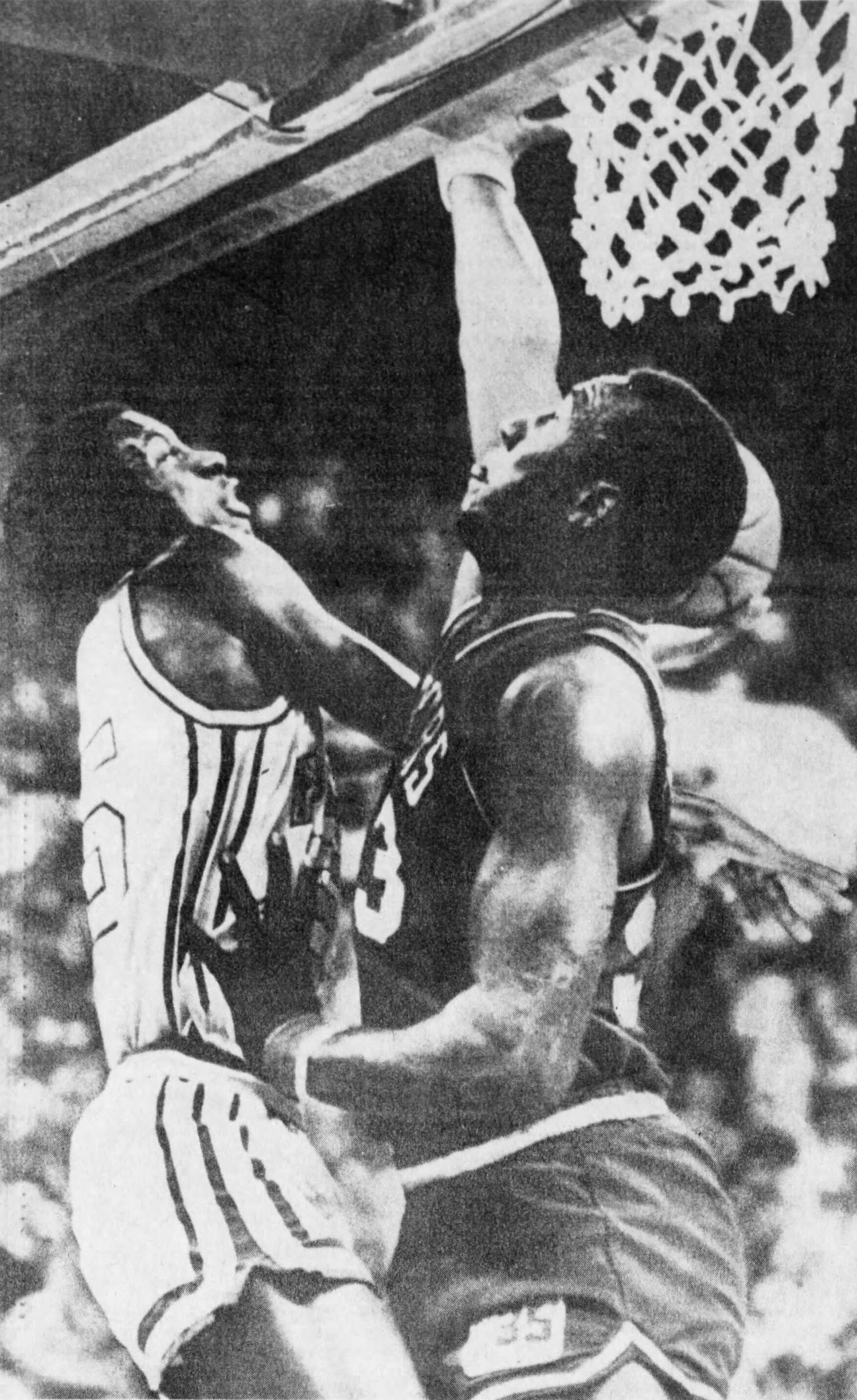
Dawkins (right) with the 76ers in 1981

With the fifth overall pick in the 1975 NBA draft, the Philadelphia 76ers selected Dawkins. He was drafted behind David Thompson, David Meyers, Marvin Webster, and Alvan Adams. He signed a seven-year contract worth $1 million.

Dawkins languished on the Sixers' bench for his first two seasons. In his second season, after playing limited minutes during the regular season, Dawkins was called upon to help the Sixers in their playoff run, to battle Dave Cowens of the Celtics and Moses Malone of the Rockets. The Sixers won both playoff series and advanced to the NBA Finals. Matched up against Portland's Bill Walton, Dawkins helped the Sixers take the first two games before the Trail Blazers won the next four to win the series in six games. In the second game of the series, Dawkins got into a fight with Maurice Lucas, resulting in both players being ejected. Dawkins took his anger out on the 76ers locker room by tearing a toilet out of the wall and dislodging a locker stall and barricading the door with it.

Dawkins' role in helping the Sixers win the Eastern Conference championship established him as one of Philadelphia's top players, on a team that included Julius Erving, George McGinnis, Lloyd Free, and Doug Collins. At 20 years old, Dawkins averaged 11.7 points and 7.9 rebounds in nearly 25 minutes per game, while ranked second in the league in field goal percentage at .575. For the second straight year, the Sixers earned the top seed in the Eastern Division and advanced to the conference finals, but they were defeated by the Washington Bullets in six games.

Prior to the 1978–79 season, Philadelphia traded McGinnis to the Denver Nuggets, clearing the way for Dawkins to be a permanent frontcourt starter. Over the next three seasons, Dawkins and Caldwell Jones split time at the center and power forward positions. In 1979–80, he averaged 14.7 points and a career-high 8.7 rebounds, helping the Sixers back to the NBA Finals, which they lost to the Los Angeles Lakers in six games.

In the 1981 season, Dawkins produced a .607 field-goal percentage, second in the NBA to Artis Gilmore's .670. Dawkins averaged 14 points and 7.2 rebounds for the year, but Philadelphia failed to return to the Finals. The club met the Boston Celtics in the Eastern Conference Finals and lost in seven games.

The 76ers suffered another postseason disappointment in 1982 when they reached the Finals but lost again to the Los Angeles Lakers in six games. Frustrated with the team's inability to handle Lakers center Kareem Abdul-Jabbar, Sixers management traded Dawkins to the New Jersey Nets and Caldwell Jones to the Houston Rockets for Moses Malone, who helped Philadelphia win the NBA championship the following year.

=== New Jersey Nets ===
Dawkins was traded to the Nets during the 1982 off-season in exchange for a first-round draft pick. At age 25, Dawkins joined a Nets club that included Albert King, Buck Williams, and Otis Birdsong. His first two seasons with the Nets were successful for both sides, as Dawkins experienced a career renaissance of sorts and the Nets had their most successful seasons to that point.

In the 1982–83 season, Dawkins averaged 12 points and shot .599 from the floor, ranking third in the league in field-goal percentage. The Nets' 49–33 record that year was their best record since the ABA–NBA merger, and remained their best record until the 2001–02 season.

The next season, he poured in a career-high 16.8 points per game on .593 field-goal shooting and grabbed 6.7 rebounds per contest. On November 3, 1983, Dawkins grabbed what would be his highest rebound total as a Net, with 15 during a 112–107 win over the Chicago Bulls. Two days later, on November 5, 1983, Dawkins set the Nets' franchise record for blocks in a single game, with 13. In the first round of the playoffs, the sixth-seeded Nets were matched up with Dawkins' former team, the Philadelphia 76ers. The Nets won the first two games in Philadelphia of the best-of-five series, which were the first playoff game victories in team history. After Philadelphia won the next two games, the Nets won a decisive game 5 when Dawkins' defense on reigning MVP Moses Malone helped New Jersey overcome a late deficit to win their first playoff series. The Nets' playoff series win over the defending NBA champions was ranked as the seventh-greatest playoff upset by Sports Illustrated. Despite Dawkins averaging 22.3 points and 7.3 rebounds per game in the following series against the Milwaukee Bucks, including leading all scorers with a career playoff-high 32 points in a 106–100 game 1 win, the Nets would lose the series in six games after losing game 6, during which Dawkins scored 29 points and grabbed 8 rebounds, by one point, at a score of 98–97. For the playoffs, Dawkins averaged 18.4 points.

With the Nets looking to be a team on the rise led by Dawkins, they entered the 1984–85 season with high expectations. However injuries limited him to just 39 games. Dawkins appeared to return to form the following season averaging 15.3 points and shooting .644 from the floor, but an injury midway through the season kept him out of 31 of the team's final 32 games. He only played six games in the 1986–87 season, after a second back surgery in less than two years.

=== Later career ===
Dawkins was traded to the Utah Jazz in a seven-player, three-team trade during the 1987 offseason. His tenure with Utah lasted just four games before the Jazz traded him to the Detroit Pistons for a pair of second-round draft picks and an undisclosed amount of cash.

Dawkins' personality was a natural fit on the "Bad Boys" Pistons team, and despite being limited to 14 games over two seasons, he was considered to be one of the leaders of the team. Dawkins was often inactive for games as he was still recovering from his back injuries and dealing with the death of his estranged wife. In his final season in the NBA, the Pistons won the NBA championship, and Dawkins finally earned a championship ring.

Dawkins received a training camp invitation from the Orlando Magic for their inaugural season in 1989, but he opted to play in Italy. He spent several seasons in Italy, playing for Torino, Olimpia Milano and Telemarket Forli. He attempted a comeback in 1994, attending Denver Nuggets training camp, and again in 1995 with the Boston Celtics.

Dawkins set an NBA record by committing 386 personal fouls during the 1983–1984 season. He committed one more personal foul during his career than Michael Jordan, despite playing nearly 350 fewer games.

=== Signature dunking ===
In a game against the Kansas City Kings at Municipal Auditorium on November 13, 1979, Dawkins broke the backboard, sending the Kings' Bill Robinzine ducking. Three weeks later he did it again, this time at home against the San Antonio Spurs at the Spectrum. A few days after that the NBA created a new rule that breaking a backboard was an offense that would result in a fine and suspension.

Dawkins named the first backboard-breaking dunk "The Chocolate-Thunder-Flying, Robinzine-Crying, Teeth-Shaking, Glass-Breaking, Rump-Roasting, Bun-Toasting, Wham-Bam, Glass-Breaker-I-Am-Jam." He named other dunks as well: the Rim Wrecker, the Go-Rilla, the Look Out Below, the In-Your-Face Disgrace, the Cover Your Head, the Yo-Mama, the Spine-Chiller Supreme, and the Greyhound Special (for the rare occasions when he went coast to coast). The 76ers also kept a separate column on the stat sheet for Dawkins's self-created nicknames: "Sir Slam" and "Chocolate Thunder." Dawkins also wore gold chain necklaces during games until the end of the 1980 NBA Finals when the NBA banned players from wearing them on court. One gold chain had a cross while the other featured one of his nicknames "Sir Slam" in gold script. He also had a similar necklace that has another nickname "Dr. Dunk" in gold script. Sometimes, Dawkins would also shave his head and have it oiled along with wearing an earring.

At one point, Dawkins claimed to be an alien from the planet Lovetron, where he spent the off-season practicing "interplanetary funkmanship" where his girlfriend Juicy Lucy lived.

Musician Stevie Wonder, who frequently attended Sixers games, gave Dawkins the nickname "Chocolate Thunder".

== Post-NBA career ==
Following his NBA career, Dawkins had a brief stint with the Harlem Globetrotters, followed by a season spent with the Sioux Falls Skyforce of the Continental Basketball Association in the 1995–96 season. During this season, the Skyforce's games against the Florida Beach Dogs were broadcast nationally by ESPN, as the Beach Dogs included another former NBA player, Manute Bol.

Dawkins was the head coach of the American Basketball Association's Newark Express. He was also the player/coach of the Winnipeg Cyclone, a team in the short-lived International Basketball Association in 1999–2000. Dawkins averaged 3.8 points and 3.9 rebounds in 18 games played with the Cyclone.

Dawkins was the head coach of the Allentown, Pennsylvania-based Pennsylvania ValleyDawgs of the United States Basketball League (USBL) until they folded. He was selected as the USBL Coach of the Year in 1999. Dawkins appeared in one game with ValleyDawgs during the 2000 season.

On August 20, 2009, Lehigh Carbon Community College, located in Schnecksville, Pennsylvania, announced Dawkins as head coach of the basketball team. He served in that role from 2009 to 2011.

== Other media ==
On April 7, 1986, he appeared at WrestleMania II as a guest judge for a boxing match between Mr. T (with Joe Frazier, The Haiti Kid) versus Roddy Piper (with Bob Orton and Lou Duva).

In 1989, Dawkins appeared as himself (credited as "The Basketball Star") in the documentary The Big Bang.

Dawkins appears in NBA Ballers and the NBA 2K video games as a reserve member of the 1980s Legends East Team. He also appears in NBA Live Mobile as a Legend based on his 1979–80 season with the Sixers.

In 2005, Dawkins was one of several former NBA players to audition for an analyst position with ESPN, as part of the network's reality series Dream Job.

== Personal life ==
Dawkins' autobiography Chocolate Thunder: The Uncensored Life and Times of Darryl Dawkins (co-authored with Charley Rosen) chronicles his on- and off-the-court life as an NBA star. In the book, Dawkins chronicled some of the racism he encountered during his NBA career, playing alongside 76ers superstar Julius Erving, and his off-the-court experiences with drugs, partying, and women.

In September 1986, Dawkins eloped with Kelly Barnes of Trenton, New Jersey. The following autumn, the two were planning to divorce when she committed suicide on November 1, 1987, at her parents' home in New Jersey; Dawkins was in Utah with his team at the time. In 1988, Dawkins married a former Nets cheerleader, Robbin Thornton; they divorced after 10 years. Dawkins later remarried; he and his wife, Janice, had three children: Nick, Alexis, and Tabitha, a daughter from Janice's previous relationship who has Down syndrome.

His son, Nick Dawkins, plays football at Penn State University.

In 1999, Saturday Night Live named Dawkins the "Man of the Millennium" in a Weekend Update sketch.

== Death ==
Dawkins died on August 27, 2015, in Allentown, Pennsylvania, at the age of 58. The Lehigh County coroner's office announced that an autopsy would be performed on August 27, but according to a statement released by Dawkins' family, the cause of death was a heart attack.

Over 600 people attended his public casket viewing. Among them were former boxing heavyweight champion Larry Holmes, former 76ers teammate Billy Cunningham (who also coached Dawkins for five of his seven seasons with the team), former New Jersey Net Tim Bassett, and modern NBA players Jason Thompson and Karl-Anthony Towns.

== Career statistics ==
Legend
GP	Games played	GS	Games started	MPG	Minutes per game
FG%	Field goal percentage	3P%	3-point field goal percentage	FT%	Free throw percentage
RPG	Rebounds per game	APG	Assists per game	SPG	Steals per game
BPG	Blocks per game	PPG	Points per game	**Bold**	Career high
*	Led the league

=== NBA ===
==== Regular season ====
Year	Team	GP	GS	MPG	FG%	3P%	FT%	RPG	APG	SPG	BPG	PPG
1975–76	Philadelphia	37	1	4.5	.500		.333	1.3	.1	.1	.2	2.4
1976–77	Philadelphia	59	0	11.6	.628		.506	3.9	.4	.2	.8	5.3
1977–78	Philadelphia	70	11	24.6	.575		.709	7.9	1.2	.5	1.8	11.7
1978–79	Philadelphia	78	12	26.1	.517		.672	8.1	1.6	.4	1.8	13.1
1979–80	Philadelphia	80	80	31.8	.522	.000	.653	**8.7**	**1.9**	.6	1.8	14.7
1980–81	Philadelphia	76	76	27.5	.607	–	.720	7.2	1.4	.5	1.5	14.0
1981–82	Philadelphia	48	36	23.4	.564	.000	.695	6.4	1.1	.4	1.1	11.0
1982–83	New Jersey	**81**	**81**	25.8	.599	–	.646	5.2	1.4	**.8**	**1.9**	12.0
1983–84	New Jersey	**81**	80	29.8	.593	**.400**	**.735**	6.7	1.5	.7	1.7	**16.8**
1984–85	New Jersey	39	30	24.9	.566	.000	.711	4.6	1.2	.4	.9	13.5
1985–86	New Jersey	51	3	23.7	**.644**	.000	.707	4.9	1.5	.3	1.2	15.3
1986–87	New Jersey	6	2	17.7	.625	–	.708	3.2	.3	.3	.5	9.5
1987–88	Utah	4	0	6.5	.143	–	.333	1.3	.3	.0	.3	1.5
1987–88	Detroit	2	0	3.5	.500	–	.667	.0	.5	.0	.5	2.0
1988–89	Detroit	14	0	3.4	.474	–	.500	.5	.1	.0	.1	1.9
Career		726	412	23.7	.572	.133	.685	6.1	1.3	.5	1.4	12.0

==== Playoffs ====
Year	Team	GP	GS	MPG	FG%	3P%	FT%	RPG	APG	SPG	BPG	PPG
1977	Philadelphia	18		18.4	.526		.660	5.4	.9	.4	1.0	7.3
1978	Philadelphia	10		18.0	.509		.529	5.7	1.0	.3	1.5	6.3
1979	Philadelphia	9		28.3	.528		.681	**9.1**	1.3	.2	1.8	16.0
1980	Philadelphia	18*		**33.7**	.529	.000	.645	7.6	1.8	.7	2.3	17.3
1981	Philadelphia	16		26.3	.562	–	.721	6.1	.9	.2	1.0	13.8
1982	Philadelphia	**21***		21.9	.556	–	.660	4.7	.5	.3	1.7	11.0
1983	New Jersey	2		29.5	**.773**	.000	**1.000**	5.0	1.0	**2.0**	**2.5**	18.0
1984	New Jersey	11		30.9	.559	.000	.843	6.2	1.2	.5	.9	**18.4**
1985	New Jersey	3	**3**	21.3	.478	–	.750	4.7	1.3	.7	2.0	8.3
1986	New Jersey	1	0	17.0	.667	–	.667	3.0	**3.0**	.0	2.0	10.0
Career		109	3	25.1	.546	.000	.703	6.1	1.1	.4	1.5	12.6

=== Serie A ===
==== Regular season ====
Year	Team	GP	GS	MPG	FG%	3P%	FT%	RPG	APG	SPG	BPG	PPG
1990-91	Auxilium Torino	30	-	36.5	.840	.000	.702	11.4	1.3	1.9	1.6	21.4
1991-92	Libertas Forlì	30	-	28.8	.809	.500	.760	9.0	0.6	2.9	1.0	15.2

== See also ==
- List of NBA career field goal percentage leaders
- List of NBA career playoff blocks leaders
- List of NBA single-game blocks leaders
