= 1979–80 Philadelphia 76ers season =

NBA professional basketball team season

- Conference champions
- Head coach: Billy Cunningham
- General manager: Pat Williams
- Arena: The Spectrum

Results
- Record: 59–23 (.720)
- Place: Division: 2nd (Atlantic); Conference: 3rd (Eastern)
- Playoff finish: NBA Finals (lost to Lakers 2–4)
- Stats at Basketball Reference

Local media
- Television: WKBS-TV; PRISM
- Radio: WCAU

The 1979–80 Philadelphia 76ers season was the 76ers 31st season in the National Basketball Association (NBA) and 17th season in Philadelphia. They finished with a record of 59–23, their best since the 1967–68 season.

== Overview ==
The team had acquired guard Lionel Hollins from the Portland Trail Blazers after their effort to obtain Pete Maravich failed as he signed with the Boston Celtics.

In the playoffs, they won the 1980 Eastern Conference Championship over the Boston Celtics 4–1. In the 1980 NBA Finals they would lose to the Los Angeles Lakers 4–2. The series was memorable for Julius Erving's baseline move in Game 4, and Magic Johnson's 42-point effort in Game 6 starting the game at center in place of an injured Kareem Abdul-Jabbar.

== Offseason ==
=== NBA draft ===
Round	Pick	Player	Position	Nationality	School/Club team
1	16	Jim Spanarkel	SG	United States	Duke
2	36	Clint Richardson	SG	United States	Seattle
2	37	Bernard Toone	PF	United States	Marquette
3	58	Earl Cureton	PF	United States	Detroit
4	83	Mike Niles	SF	United States	Cal State Fullerton

== Roster ==
1979–80 Philadelphia 76ers roster
Players

Pos.	No.	Player	Height	Weight	DOB	From
G	14	Henry Bibby	6 ft 1 in (1.85 m)	185 lb (84 kg)	1949–11–24	UCLA
G	10	Maurice Cheeks	6 ft 1 in (1.85 m)	180 lb (82 kg)	1956–09–08	West Texas A&M
G	20	Doug Collins (injured)	6 ft 6 in (1.98 m)	180 lb (82 kg)	1951-07-28	Illinois State
C	53	Darryl Dawkins	6 ft 11 in (2.11 m)	251 lb (114 kg)	1957-01-11	Maynard Evans HS (FL)
F	6	Julius Erving	6 ft 6 in (1.98 m)	210 lb (95 kg)	1950-02-22	UMass
G	9	Lionel Hollins	6 ft 3 in (1.91 m)	185 lb (84 kg)	1953–10–19	Arizona State
F	24	Bobby Jones	6 ft 9 in (2.06 m)	210 lb (95 kg)	1951–12–18	North Carolina
C	11	Caldwell Jones	6 ft 11 in (2.11 m)	217 lb (98 kg)	1950–08–04	Albany State
G	4	Clint Richardson	6 ft 3 in (1.91 m)	195 lb (88 kg)	1956–08–07	Seattle
F	50	Steve Mix	6 ft 7 in (2.01 m)	215 lb (98 kg)	1947–12–30	Toledo
G	34	Jim Spanarkel	6 ft 5 in (1.96 m)	190 lb (86 kg)	1957-06-28	Duke
F	3	Bernard Toone	6 ft 9 in (2.06 m)	210 lb (95 kg)	1956-07-14	Marquette

Coaches
Head coach
- Billy Cunningham
Assistant(s)
- Chuck Daly
- Jack McMahon

Legend
- (DP) Unsigned draft pick
- (FA) Free agent
- (S) Suspended
- Injured

== Regular season ==
=== Season standings ===
Atlantic Division	W	L	PCT	GB	Home	Road	Div
y-Boston Celtics	61	21	.744	–	35–6	26–15	17–7
x-Philadelphia 76ers	59	23	.720	2	36–5	23–18	19–5
x-Washington Bullets	39	43	.476	22	24–17	15–26	9–15
New York Knicks	39	43	.476	22	25–16	14–27	8–16
New Jersey Nets	34	48	.415	27	22–19	12–29	7–17

#	Eastern Conference				
#	Team	W	L	PCT	GB
1	z-Boston Celtics	61	21	.744	–
2	y-Atlanta Hawks	50	32	.610	11
3	x-Philadelphia 76ers	59	23	.720	2
4	x-Houston Rockets	41	41	.500	20
5	x-San Antonio Spurs	41	41	.500	20
6	x-Washington Bullets	39	43	.476	22
7	New York Knicks	39	43	.476	22
8	Cleveland Cavaliers	37	45	.451	24
8	Indiana Pacers	37	45	.451	24
10	New Jersey Nets	34	48	.415	27
11	Detroit Pistons	16	66	.195	44

== Game log ==
=== Regular season ===
1979–80 game log
Total: 59–23 (home: 36–5; road: 23–18)
October: 8–1 (home: 4–0; road: 4–1)

Game	Date	Team	Score	High points	High rebounds	High assists	Location Attendance	Record
1	October 12, 1979	@ Washington	W 93–92				Capital Centre	1–0
2	October 13, 1979	Houston	W 113–105				The Spectrum	2–0
3	October 17, 1979	@ New Jersey	W 113–88				Rutgers Athletic Center	3–0
4	October 19, 1979	Detroit	W 112–104				The Spectrum	4–0
5	October 20, 1979	@ New York	W 136–111				Madison Square Garden	5–0
6	October 24, 1979	Indiana	W 132–110				The Spectrum	6–0
7	October 26, 1979	New York	W 127–116				TheSpectrum	7–0
8	October 27, 1979	@ Cleveland	W 112–106				Richfield Coliseum	8–0
9	October 31, 1979	@ Atlanta	L 97–102				The Omni	8–1

November: 10–6 (home: 7–2; road: 3–4)

Game	Date	Team	Score	High points	High rebounds	High assists	Location Attendance	Record
10	November 2, 1979	Atlanta	L 81–85				The Spectrum	8–2
11	November 3, 1979	@ Indiana	W 120–114 (2OT)				Market Square Arena	9–2
12	November 6, 1979	@ Milwaukee	W 118–117 (OT)				MECCA Arena	10–2
13	November 7, 1979	Kansas City	W 110–102				The Spectrum	11–2
14	November 9, 1979	@ Detroit	L 98–106				Pontiac Silverdome	11–3
15	November 10, 1979	Boston	W 95–94				The Spectrum	12–3
16	November 13, 1979	@ Kansas City	L 103–110				Municipal Auditorium	12–4
17	November 16, 1979	San Antonio	L 105–106				The Spectrum	12–5
18	November 17, 1979	@ Chicago	L 103–106 (OT)				Chicago Stadium	12–6
19	November 20, 1979	@ San Antonio	W 118–114				HemisFair Arena	13–6
20	November 21, 1979	@ Houston	L 94–97				The Summit	13–7
21	November 23, 1979	Houston	W 113–102				The Spectrum	14–7
22	November 24, 1979	New Jersey	W 91–82				The Spectrum	15–7
23	November 26, 1979	Indiana	W 113–112				The Spectrum	16–7
24	November 28, 1979	Washington	W 120–102				The Spectrum	17–7
25	November 30, 1979	San Diego	W 104–101				The Spectrum	18–7

December: 9–4 (home: 6–1; road: 3–3)

Game	Date	Team	Score	High points	High rebounds	High assists	Location Attendance	Record
26	December 1, 1979	Cleveland	W 117–105				The Spectrum	19–7
27	December 5, 1979	San Antonio	W 132–120				The Spectrum	20–7
28	December 8, 1979	Phoenix	W 117–96				The Spectrum	21–7
29	December 12, 1979	Milwaukee	W 112–91				The Spectrum	22–7
30	December 14, 1979	Atlanta	L 98–103				The Spectrum	22–8
31	December 15, 1979	@ Atlanta	L 96–112				The Omni	22–9
32	December 18, 1979	@ Detroit	W 114–102				Pontiac Silverdome	23–9
33	December 19, 1979	@ Boston	L 89–112				Boston Garden	23–10
34	December 21, 1979	Houston	W 117–106				The Spectrum	24–10
35	December 22, 1979	Boston	W 126–113				The Spectrum	25–10
36	December 25, 1979	@ Washington	W 93–92				Capital Centre	26–10
37	December 27, 1979	@ San Antonio	W 118–114				HemisFair Arena	27–10
38	December 29, 1979	@ Houston	L 100–104				The Summit	27–11

January: 11–3 (home: 6–0; road: 5–3)

Game	Date	Team	Score	High points	High rebounds	High assists	Location Attendance	Record
39	January 3, 1980	@ Cleveland	W 109–108				Richfield Coliseum	28–11
40	January 8, 1980	@ New York	W 111–108				Madison Square Garden	29–11
41	January 9, 1980	New Jersey	W 108–105				The Spectrum	30–11
42	January 11, 1980	Washington	W 119–106				The Spectrum	31–11
43	January 13, 1980	New York	W 126–112				The Spectrum	32–11
44	January 16, 1980	Portland	W 121–110				The Spectrum	33–11
45	January 18, 1980	@ New Jersey	W 112–105				Rutgers Athletic Center	34–11
46	January 19, 1980	Cleveland	W 111–107				The Spectrum	35–11
47	January 23, 1980	@ Denver	W 118–93				McNichols Sports Arena	36–11
48	January 25, 1980	@ Los Angeles	L 103–124				The Forum	36–12
49	January 27, 1980	@ Phoenix	L 118–125				Arizona Veterans Memorial Coliseum	36–13
50	January 28, 1980	@ Utah	L 101–107				Salt Palace	36–14
51	January 30, 1980	Detroit	W 121–108				The Spectrum	37–14
52	January 31, 1980	@ Houston	W 110–105				The Summit	38–14

February: 10–3 (home: 5–1; road: 5–2)

Game	Date	Team	Score	High points	High rebounds	High assists	Location Attendance	Record
All-Star Break
53	February 5, 1980	@ Indiana	W 109–108				Market Square Arena	39–14
54	February 6, 1980	@ Boston	L 110–129				Boston Garden	39–15
55	February 8, 1980	Seattle	L 94–109				The Spectrum	39–16
56	February 10, 1980	Los Angeles	W 105–104				The Spectrum	40–16
57	February 13, 1980	Utah	W 107–85				The Spectrum	41–16
58	February 15, 1980	@ Detroit	W 114–104				Pontiac Silverdome	42–16
59	February 16, 1980	Chicago	W 100–92				The Spectrum	43–16
60	February 17, 1980	Cleveland	W 115–100				The Spectrum	44–16
61	February 21, 1980	@ San Diego	L 99–104				San Diego Sports Arena	44–17
62	February 24, 1980	@ Golden State	W 103–100				Oakland-Alameda County Coliseum Arena	45–17
63	February 26, 1980	@ Portland	W 98–96				Memorial Coliseum	46–17
64	February 27, 1980	@ Seattle	W 101–98 (OT)				Kingdome	47–17
65	February 29, 1980	Denver	W 104–103				The Spectrum	48–17

March: 11–6 (home: 8–1; road: 3–5)

Game	Date	Team	Score	High points	High rebounds	High assists	Location Attendance	Record
66	March 2, 1980	Golden State	W 144–99				The Spectrum	48–18
67	March 5, 1980	Indiana	W 120–113				The Spectrum	49–18
68	March 7, 1980	@ Boston	L 92–111				Boston Garden	50–18
69	March 9, 1980	@ San Antonio	W 134–118				HemisFair Arena	51–18
70	March 11, 1980	@ Atlanta	W 102–97 (OT)				The Omni	52–18
71	March 12, 1980	Washington	W 105–98				The Spectrum	53–18
72	March 14, 1980	@ Indiana	L 94–104				Market Square Arena	53–19
73	March 16, 1980	@ Cleveland	L 109–123				Richfield Coliseum	53–20
74	March 17, 1980	Detroit	W 123–109				The Spectrum	54–20
75	March 19, 1980	San Antonio	L 99–105				The Spectrum	54–21
76	March 20, 1980	@ Washington	L 113–119 (OT)				Capital Centre	54–22
77	March 21, 1980	New Jersey	W 108–99				The Spectrum	55–22
78	March 23, 1980	New York	W 112–108				The Spectrum	56–22
79	March 26, 1980	Atlanta	W 84–81				The Spectrum	57–22
80	March 27, 1980	@ New York	W 103–101				Madison Square Garden	58–22
81	March 28, 1980	@ New Jersey	L 92–99				Rutgers Athletic Center	58–23
82	March 30, 1980	Boston	W 116–110				The Spectrum	59–23

1979–80 schedule

=== Playoffs ===
1980 playoff game log
First Round: 2–0 (home: 1–0; road: 1–0)

Game	Date	Team	Score	High points	High rebounds	High assists	Location Attendance	Series
1	April 2, 1980	Washington	W 111–96	Lionel Hollins (21)	Caldwell Jones (26)	Maurice Cheeks (6)	The Spectrum; 12,567	1–0
2	April 4, 1980	@ Washington	W 112–104	Julius Erving (31)	Lionel Hollins (9)	Maurice Cheeks (7)	Capital Centre; 18,397	2–0

Conference semifinals: 4–1 (home: 2–0; road: 2–1)

Game	Date	Team	Score	High points	High rebounds	High assists	Location Attendance	Series
1	April 6, 1980	Atlanta	W 107–104	Julius Erving (28)	Caldwell Jones (13)	Maurice Cheeks (9)	The Spectrum; 10,561	1–0
2	April 9, 1980	Atlanta	W 99–92	Darryl Dawkins (22)	Bobby Jones (9)	Maurice Cheeks (7)	The Spectrum; 18,276	2–0
3	April 10, 1980	@ Atlanta	L 93–105	Julius Erving (26)	Caldwell Jones (16)	Caldwell Jones (4)	The Omni; 15,617	2–1
4	April 13, 1980	@ Atlanta	W 107–83	Hollins, B. Jones (20)	Caldwell Jones (11)	Maurice Cheeks (5)	The Omni; 15,617	3–1
5	April 15, 1980	Atlanta	W 105–100	Dawkins, Erving (30)	Caldwell Jones (13)	Lionel Hollins (7)	The Spectrum; 18,276	4–1

Conference finals: 4–1 (home: 2–0; road: 2–1)

Game	Date	Team	Score	High points	High rebounds	High assists	Location Attendance	Series
1	April 18, 1980	@ Boston	W 96–93	Julius Erving (29)	Darryl Dawkins (10)	Cheeks, Hollins (6)	Boston Garden; 15,320	1–0
2	April 20, 1980	@ Boston	L 90–96	Julius Erving (24)	Darryl Dawkins (11)	Lionel Hollins (5)	Boston Garden; 15,320	1–1
3	April 23, 1980	Boston	W 99–97	Julius Erving (28)	Julius Erving (11)	Lionel Hollins (9)	The Spectrum; 18,276	2–1
4	April 25, 1980	Boston	W 102–90	Julius Erving (30)	Julius Erving (10)	Maurice Cheeks (10)	The Spectrum; 18,276	3–1
5	April 27, 1980	@ Boston	W 105–94	Lionel Hollins (24)	three players tied (9)	Lionel Hollins (7)	Boston Garden; 15,320	4–1

NBA Finals: 2–4 (home: 1–2; road: 1–2)

Game	Date	Team	Score	High points	High rebounds	High assists	Location Attendance	Series
1	May 4, 1980	@ Los Angeles	L 102–109	Julius Erving (20)	Bobby Jones (10)	Lionel Hollins (8)	The Forum; 17,505	0–1
2	May 7, 1980	@ Los Angeles	W 107–104	Darryl Dawkins (25)	Julius Erving (10)	Maurice Cheeks (10)	The Forum; 17,505	1–1
3	May 10, 1980	Los Angeles	L 101–111	Julius Erving (24)	Caldwell Jones (11)	Lionel Hollins (9)	The Spectrum; 18,726	1–2
4	May 11, 1980	Los Angeles	W 105–102	Darryl Dawkins (26)	Caldwell Jones (10)	Lionel Hollins (13)	The Spectrum; 18,726	2–2
5	May 14, 1980	@ Los Angeles	L 103–108	Julius Erving (36)	Caldwell Jones (10)	Lionel Hollins (10)	The Forum; 17,505	2–3
6	May 16, 1980	Los Angeles	L 107–123	Julius Erving (27)	Bobby Jones (9)	Maurice Cheeks (8)	The Spectrum; 18,726	2–4

1980 schedule

== Awards and records ==
- Julius Erving, All-NBA First Team
- Bobby Jones, NBA All-Defensive First Team
