= Lionel Hollins =

American basketball player and coach (born 1953)

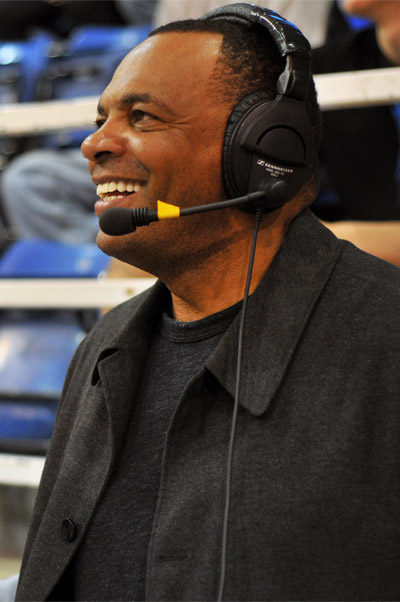
- Hollins in Vancouver during a 2010 pre-season game

Personal information
- Born: October 19, 1953 (age 73) Arkansas City, Kansas, U.S.
- Listed height: 6 ft 3 in (1.91 m)
- Listed weight: 185 lb (84 kg)

Career information
- High school: Rancho (North Las Vegas, Nevada)
- College: Dixie State (1971–1973); Arizona State (1973–1975)
- NBA draft: 1975: 1st round, 6th overall pick
- Drafted by: Portland Trail Blazers
- Playing career: 1975–1985
- Position: Point guard
- Number: 14, 9
- Coaching career: 1985–present

Career history

Playing
- 1975–1980: Portland Trail Blazers
- 1980–1982: Philadelphia 76ers
- 1982–1983: San Diego Clippers
- 1983–1984: Detroit Pistons
- 1984–1985: Houston Rockets

Coaching
- 1985–1988: Arizona State (assistant)
- 1988–1995: Phoenix Suns (assistant)
- 1995–1999: Vancouver Grizzlies (assistant)
- 1999–2000: Vancouver Grizzlies (interim)
- 2000–2001: Las Vegas Silver Bandits
- 2002: Saint Louis Skyhawks
- 2002–2007: Memphis Grizzlies (assistant)
- 2004: Memphis Grizzlies (interim)
- 2008–2009: Milwaukee Bucks (assistant)
- 2009–2013: Memphis Grizzlies
- 2014–2016: Brooklyn Nets
- 2019–2021: Los Angeles Lakers (assistant)
- 2022–2023: Houston Rockets (assistant)

Career highlights
- NBA champion (1977); NBA All-Star (1978); NBA All-Defensive First Team (1978); NBA All-Defensive Second Team (1979); NBA All-Rookie First Team (1976); No. 14 retired by Portland Trail Blazers; Third-team All-American – AP, NABC (1975); 2× First-team All-WAC (1974, 1975); No. 33 jersey retired by Arizona State Sun Devils; As assistant coach: NBA champion (2020)

Career statistics
- Points: 7,809 (11.6 ppg)
- Assists: 3,006 (4.5 apg)
- Steals: 1,053 (1.6 spg)
- Stats at NBA.com
- Stats at Basketball Reference

Lionel Eugene Hollins (born October 19, 1953) is an American professional basketball coach and former player who most recently served as an assistant coach for the Houston Rockets of the National Basketball Association (NBA). A point guard, Hollins played for the Portland Trail Blazers, winning an NBA championship in 1977 and named an NBA All-Star in 1978. The Trail Blazers retired his No. 14.

== Playing career ==
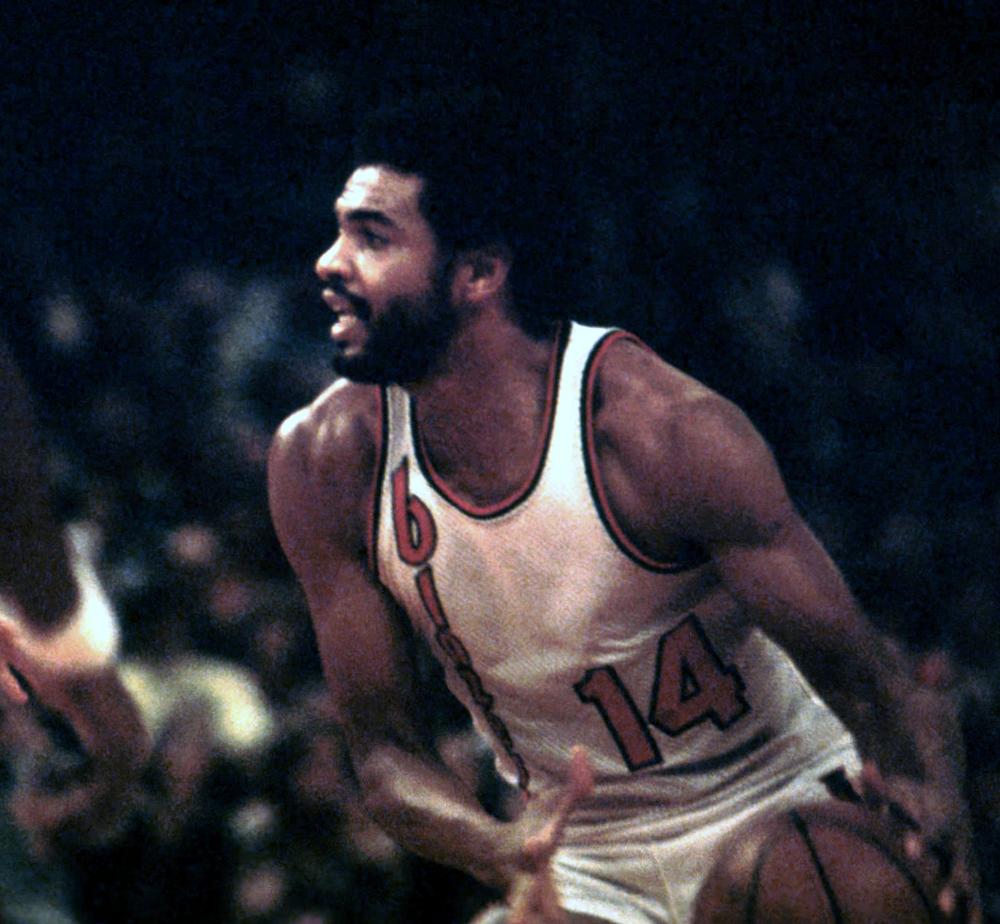
Hollins was a key member of the Trail Blazers' 1976–77 championship team.

During his ten-year NBA career playing as a point guard he played for five teams, averaging 11.6 points and 4.5 assists per game. In 1974 Lionel suffered a serious injury from a moped crash when a bicyclist collided. Fortunately this did not affect his career, but ultimately his left pinky and ring finger never healed correctly.

Drafted by the Portland Trail Blazers with the sixth pick of the 1975 NBA draft out of Arizona State University, Hollins was bestowed All-Rookie first team honors that season, averaging 10.8 points in 78 games for the Blazers. Prior to his two seasons at Arizona State, he played two years at Dixie College in St. George, Utah.

He graduated from Arizona State University in 1986 with a degree in sociology.

He was a member of Trail Blazers' 1976–77 championship team, and made his only All-Star Game appearance one year later. He was a member of the NBA All-Defensive team twice, in 1978 and 1979.

On April 18, 2007, the Portland Trail Blazers retired his #14 jersey.

== Coaching career ==
After retiring as a player, Hollins returned to his alma mater to serve as an assistant coach at Arizona State in 1985, and stayed until 1988, when Cotton Fitzsimmons brought him on to his new staff with the Phoenix Suns.

In his first season with Phoenix, the Suns saw a 27-game improvement from their previous year, as they advanced to the Western Conference Finals and Fitzsimmons was named Coach of the Year. Kevin Johnson, who won Most Improved Player that season, credited Hollins with his development into one of the all-time great Suns players.

Hollins assistant coach tenure was during arguably the most successful time period for the Suns; joining a team that had missed the playoffs three straight years, the Suns exceeded 53 wins and only failed to get out of the first round of the playoffs once in his seven seasons there. His run in Phoenix was highlighted by a 62–20 season in 1992–93, led by new head coach Paul Westphal and league MVP Charles Barkley, culminating in an NBA Finals appearance where they would lose to the Chicago Bulls.

In 1995, Hollins was named to the inaugural coaching staff of the expansion Vancouver Grizzlies. On December 16, 1999, Hollins was named interim coach of the Grizzlies following the midseason firing of Brian Hill. Despite popularity with the players, Hollins was not retained as coach at season's end. Though not a full season and on an interim basis, this was the first of three different stints for Hollins as Grizzlies coach.

In 2000, Hollins served as head coach the Las Vegas Silver Bandits of the International Basketball League (IBL) in the league's second season. Despite the second best record in the IBL at 20–11 at the time, on March 13, 2001, the Bandits folded (and following the conclusion of the 2000–01 season, the IBL did too).

Hollins next served as an assistant coach for the Harlem Globetrotters during their 2001 Fall College Exhibition Series. He served as head coach for the St. Louis SkyHawks of the United States Basketball League (USBL) in 2002.

In 2002, Hollins returned to the Grizzlies as an assistant coach, though the team was now located in Memphis. He served in this role until 2007, including a four-game stint as interim coach in 2004. On May 14, 2008, Hollins was hired as one of Milwaukee Bucks head coach Scott Skiles' assistants.

On January 25, 2009, Hollins was named the Grizzlies' head coach; this would be his third time as the Grizzlies' head coach, but the first time that was not on an interim basis. With the Grizzlies were coming off consecutive 22–60 seasons, Hollins focused on retooling the roster with players who play his "hard nosed" style, ushering in what would be known as the "Grit and Grind" era.

His first move as coach was moving Mike Conley and Marc Gasol to the starting lineup. In his first offseason, Memphis would acquire Zach Randolph and Tony Allen, both of whom Hollins saw as perfect fits for his brand of basketball. All four players would enjoy successful runs in Memphis.

On February 11, 2011, Hollins won his 100th career victory, as coach of the Memphis Grizzlies, in an 89–86 victory over the Milwaukee Bucks. That season, he led his team to a 46–36 record, earning the eighth seed in the playoffs. The Grizzlies defeated the number-one seed San Antonio Spurs, earning their first playoff series win in franchise history and becoming just the fourth eighth seed in league history to win a playoffs series against a number one seed. They would lose to the Oklahoma City Thunder in seven games in the Western Conference semifinals.

In the lockout-shortened 2011–12 NBA season, Hollins' Grizzlies finished the season with a 41–25 record and the best winning percentage in franchise history (.621). After guiding the Grizzlies to a 13–3 record during the month of April, Hollins was named April's Coach of the Month. This streak helped the Grizzlies earn the four seed in the Western Conference, with home court advantage for the first time in franchise history. They lost in the first round to the Los Angeles Clippers in seven games.

In 2012–2013, Hollins led Memphis to a franchise record 56-win season, breaking the winning percentage record they had set the previous season (now at .683). Marc Gasol was named Defensive Player of the Year as the Grizzlies held opponents to 89.3 points per game.

The Grizzlies avenged the previous playoffs and defeated the Los Angeles Clippers in six games in the first round. In the second round, they defeated the top-seeded and defending Western Conference champion Oklahoma City Thunder in five games. Though attributed to Oklahoma City being without superstar point guard Russell Westbrook for the series, Memphis advanced to their first conference finals in team history. However, a four-game sweep to the experienced San Antonio Spurs ended the Grizzlies' season and playoff run.

It was announced that Hollins' contract would not be renewed by the team on June 10, 2013. He stands as the Grizzlies' most successful coach, having improved the team's record almost every season. He led them to three straight playoff appearances, their first playoff win, a franchise best .683 winning percentage, and the first playoff series victory in franchise history. As of 2024, the Grizzlies have not been back to the conference finals since Hollins departure.

On July 2, 2014, Hollins and the Brooklyn Nets reached an agreement for him to serve as the team's head coach for the next four seasons. On July 7, 2014, he was officially introduced by the Nets at a press conference. In his first season as head coach, he guided the Nets to the playoffs. On January 10, 2016, he was relieved of his head coaching duties by the Nets after starting the 2015–16 season with a 10–27 record.

On July 31, 2019, the Los Angeles Lakers hired Hollins as an assistant coach. Hollins won his 2nd championship on October 11, 2020, when the Lakers defeated the Miami Heat in the 2020 NBA Finals in 6 games.

On July 3, 2022, the Houston Rockets hired Hollins as an assistant coach.

== Personal life ==
Hollins's son, Austin Hollins, played college basketball for the University of Minnesota's men's basketball team.

== NBA career statistics ==
Legend
GP	Games played	GS	Games started	MPG	Minutes per game
FG%	Field goal percentage	3P%	3-point field goal percentage	FT%	Free throw percentage
RPG	Rebounds per game	APG	Assists per game	SPG	Steals per game
BPG	Blocks per game	PPG	Points per game	**Bold**	Career high
†	Won an NBA championship

=== Regular season ===
Year	Team	GP	GS	MPG	FG%	3P%	FT%	RPG	APG	SPG	BPG	PPG
1975–76	Portland	74		25.6	.421	–	.721	2.4	4.1	1.8	.4	10.8
1976–77†	Portland	76		29.3	.432	–	.749	2.8	4.1	**2.2**	**.5**	14.7
1977–78	Portland	81		**33.8**	.442	–	.743	**3.4**	4.7	1.9	.4	**15.9**
1978–79	Portland	64		30.7	.454	–	.778	2.3	5.1	1.8	.4	15.3
1979–80	Portland	20		20.7	.385	.100	.642	1.0	2.5	1.5	.1	10.0
1979–80	Philadelphia	27		29.5	.415	.200	.770	2.6	4.1	1.7	.3	12.2
1980–81	Philadelphia	**82**		26.3	.470	.133	.731	2.3	4.3	1.3	.2	9.5
1981–82	Philadelphia	81	**81**	27.9	**.477**	.125	.702	2.3	3.9	1.3	.2	11.0
1982–83	San Diego	56	54	32.9	.437	.143	.721	2.3	**6.7**	2.0	.3	13.5
1983–84	Detroit	32	0	6.8	.381	.000	**.846**	.7	1.9	.4	.0	1.8
1984–85	Houston	80	60	24.4	.461	**.231**	.794	2.2	5.2	1.0	.1	7.6
Career		673		27.4	.444	.149	.741	2.4	4.5	1.6	.3	11.6
All-Star		1	0	23.0	.375	–	.800	.0	8.0	2.0	.0	10.0

=== Playoffs ===
Year	Team	GP	GS	MPG	FG%	3P%	FT%	RPG	APG	SPG	BPG	PPG
1977†	Portland	**19**	—	35.9	.417	–	.682	2.7	4.5	**2.5**	.3	**17.3**
1978	Portland	6	—	**37.2**	**.449**	–	.690	**4.8**	5.5	1.2	.0	16.7
1979	Portland	3	—	22.0	.308	–	.714	1.0	1.7	1.0	.0	7.0
1980	Philadelphia	18	—	34.3	.416	.000	.794	3.9	**6.3**	1.5	.2	13.8
1981	Philadelphia	16	—	30.6	.441	.000	.784	2.1	4.1	1.1	.1	10.2
1982	Philadelphia	8	—	14.3	.306	.000	.667	1.1	3.1	1.1	.1	4.3
1984	Detroit	2	—	3.0	.000	–	–	.0	.0	.0	.5	.0
1985	Houston	5	1	18.8	.308	–	**1.000**	1.8	3.6	.8	.0	3.4
Career		77	—	29.8	.411	.000	.733	2.7	4.5	1.5	.1	11.8

== Head coaching record ==
Legend
Regular season	G	Games coached	W	Games won	L	Games lost	W–L %	Win–loss %
Playoffs	PG	Playoff games	PW	Playoff wins	PL	Playoff losses	PW–L %	Playoff win–loss %

Team	Year	G	W	L	W–L%	Finish	PG	PW	PL	PW–L%	Result
Vancouver	1999–00	60	18	42	.300	7th in Midwest	—	—	—	—	Missed Playoffs
Memphis	2004–05	4	0	4	.000	—	—	—	—	—	—
Memphis	2008–09	39	13	26	.333	5th in Southwest	—	—	—	—	Missed Playoffs
Memphis	2009–10	82	40	42	.488	4th in Southwest	—	—	—	—	Missed Playoffs
Memphis	2010–11	82	46	36	.561	4th in Southwest	13	7	6	.538	Lost in Conf. Semifinals
Memphis	2011–12	66	41	25	.621	2nd in Southwest	7	3	4	.429	Lost in First round
Memphis	2012–13	82	56	26	.683	2nd in Southwest	15	8	7	.533	Lost in Conf. Finals
Brooklyn	2014–15	82	38	44	.463	3rd in Atlantic	6	2	4	.333	Lost in First round
Brooklyn	2015–16	37	10	27	.270	(fired)	—	—	—	—	—
Career		534	262	272	.491		41	20	21	.488	
