= Jim Chones =

American basketball player (born 1949)

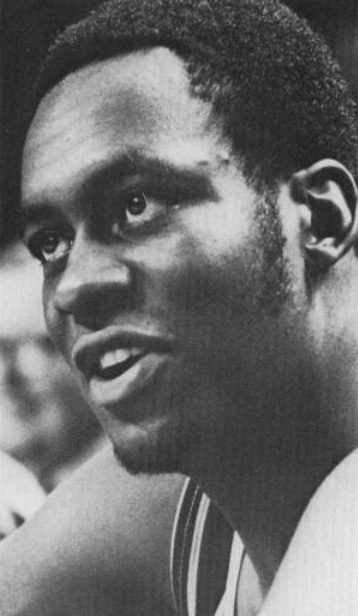
- Chones in his final season at Marquette

Personal information
- Born: November 30, 1949 (age 76) Racine, Wisconsin, U.S.
- Listed height: 6 ft 11 in (2.11 m)
- Listed weight: 220 lb (100 kg)

Career information
- High school: St. Catherine's (Racine, Wisconsin)
- College: Marquette (1970–1972)
- NBA draft: 1973: 2nd round, 31st overall pick
- Drafted by: Los Angeles Lakers
- Playing career: 1972–1983
- Position: Center / power forward
- Number: 22, 53, 9

Career history
- 1972–1973: New York Nets
- 1973–1974: Carolina Cougars
- 1974–1979: Cleveland Cavaliers
- 1979–1981: Los Angeles Lakers
- 1981–1982: Washington Bullets
- 1982–1983: Firenze

Career highlights
- NBA champion (1980); ABA All-Rookie Team (1973); Consensus first-team All-American (1972); No. 22 retired by Marquette Golden Eagles

Career NBA statistics
- Points: 7,664 (12.3 ppg)
- Rebounds: 5,196 (8.3 rpg)
- Assists: 1,079 (1.7 apg)
- Stats at NBA.com
- Stats at Basketball Reference

James Bernett "Bunny" Chones (born November 30, 1949) is an American former professional basketball player, and current radio analyst for the Cleveland Cavaliers.

Standing at 6 feet 11 inches (2.11 m), Chones starred at Marquette University as a forward/center, where he earned All-America honors as a junior in 1972 after averaging 20.5 points and 11.9 rebounds per game. When he left Marquette to pursue an ABA career, Chones was only the second player in NCAA history to leave school for professional basketball before his graduating year. The New York Nets offered Chones a sizeable contract, and stipulated that he must accept within days and leave college. As a result, he left Marquette in February 1972 with his college team undefeated and ranked second in the nation. After Chones' departure Marquette finished the season at 25–4.

Professionally, Chones first played in the American Basketball Association (ABA) with the New York Nets, with whom he was an ABA All-Rookie First Team selection. He also spent a season with the Carolina Cougars. In 1975, Chones moved to the National Basketball Association, where he played five seasons with the Cleveland Cavaliers, and later won an NBA championship with the Los Angeles Lakers in 1980. Chones retired from basketball in 1982 with combined ABA/NBA totals of 9,821 points and 6,427 rebounds.

After retiring from the NBA, Chones spent 11 seasons as the television color analyst for the Cleveland Cavaliers, and in 2007, returned as a radio postgame analyst.

During the 2010–11 season, usual Cavaliers radio voice Joe Tait missed much of the season as he recovered from surgery/illness. During that time, Chones and WTAM morning co-host/sports director and Cavs pregame/postgame host Mike Snyder formed the interim radio play by play team. Chones became a full-time member of the radio team in the 2011–12 season, working with new play by play announcer John Michael.

Chones' daughter Kaayla is a former professional basketball player and as of 2019 is the director of player program for the Minnesota Timberwolves of the NBA.

Chones is portrayed in the HBO series, Winning Time: The Rise of the Lakers Dynasty by Newton Mayenge.

== Awards and honors ==
=== College ===
- 1972 First Team All-American
- Marquette Hall of Fame Inductee (class of 2004)
- No. 22 retired by Marquette

=== Professional ===
- 1973 ABA All-Rookie First Team
- 1980 NBA Championship as a member of the Los Angeles Lakers
- Greater Cleveland Sports Hall of Fame Inductee (class of 2002)
- Cavs Wall of Honor (class of 2024)
