= Bernard Toone =

American basketball player (1956–2022)

Personal information
- Born: July 14, 1956 Yonkers, New York, U.S.
- Died: July 9, 2022 (aged 65) Yonkers, New York, U.S.
- Listed height: 6 ft 9 in (2.06 m)
- Listed weight: 210 lb (95 kg)

Career information
- High school: Gorton (Yonkers, New York)
- College: Marquette (1975–1979)
- NBA draft: 1979: 2nd round, 37th overall pick
- Drafted by: Philadelphia 76ers
- Playing career: 1979–1985
- Position: Power forward
- Number: 3

Career history
- 1979–1980: Philadelphia 76ers
- 1980–1981: Latte Matese Caserta
- 1982–1983: Gaiteros del Zulia
- 1983–1984: BV Orca
- 1984–1985: SSV Hagen

Career highlights
- NCAA champion (1977); Fourth-team All-American – NABC (1979); First-team Parade All-American (1975)
- Stats at NBA.com
- Stats at Basketball Reference

Bernard Arthur Toone (July 14, 1956 – July 9, 2022) was an American professional basketball player who played 23 games for the Philadelphia 76ers in the National Basketball Association (NBA) during the 1979–80 season. He earlier played college basketball for the Marquette Golden Eagles and helped the school win its only NCAA championship in 1977.

== Early life ==
Toone was born in Yonkers, New York, on July 14, 1956. He attended Gorton High School in his hometown, where he was an all-state player and a Parade All-American during his final year of high school in 1975. He was also ranked as one of the top American high school basketball players that year, when Gorton upset Lincoln High School, who were Section 1 AA champions, in a challenge game. Toone then studied at Marquette University, and worked at a Miller Brewing Company brewery in Milwaukee with Jim Boylan during the summer.

== College career ==
Toone played collegiately for the Marquette Warriors (later to become the Golden Eagles) from 1975 to 1979. As a sophomore reserve, he was a member of the Warriors' 1977 National Championship team in Hall of Fame coach Al McGuire's final season. His uneasy relationship with McGuire was fueled in part by Toone's lack of playing time and McGuire's belief that Toone was indifferent towards improving as a player, specifically his defense. The two quarrelled publicly throughout the season, including in the NCAA Tournament. On one earlier occasion, during the first game of the Christmas Classic against the Clemson Tigers, McGuire took Toone off in the first half after the latter allowed a Tigers player to outmaneuver him and score. McGuire then continuously berated Toone to the point of tears. The home crowd – who were unhappy with McGuire despite being accustomed to his behavior – consequently gave Toone a standing ovation when he came back during the second half.

Toone went on to score 18 points as a substitute against Wake Forest in the Midwest Regional Final, and was named as the most outstanding player of that round. He later played down his conflict with McGuire, stating that "it all paid off when we won the championship" and that "it meant a lot to me with all the controversy me and Al had". As a senior, he averaged 18.7 points and 6.7 rebounds per game and was named a fourth-team All-American by the National Association of Basketball Coaches (NABC).

== Professional career ==
After his college eligibility was over, Toone was selected in the second round (37th overall selection) of the 1979 NBA draft by the Philadelphia 76ers. He made his NBA debut on October 17, 1979, scoring two points to go along with two assists and one rebound in six minutes played against the New Jersey Nets. His NBA career lasted only one season, as he averaged 2.4 points and 1.5 rebounds per game in a reserve role for the 76ers in 1979–80. He later played professional basketball overseas, with clubs in Italy, Venezuela, the Netherlands, and West Germany.

== Later life ==
After retiring from professional basketball, Toone resided in New York, where he played in summer basketball tournaments with Ken Owens and Gary Springer. He reportedly worked at a doctor's office in his hometown during the 1990s.

Toone was arrested on three occasions during the 1980s, twice for trying to steal vehicle audio and once for driving a rental car that had been reported stolen. He also had issues with drug use. In 2014, he was featured in an ESPN documentary film called Untucked, broadcast on the show 30 for 30. He went back to Marquette in 2007 to attend the 30-year reunion of its championship team but was absent from the 40th anniversary celebrations in December 2016 due to a minor illness.

Toone died on July 9, 2022. He was 65 and suffered from cancer prior to his death.

== Career statistics ==
Legend
GP	Games played	GS	Games started	MPG	Minutes per game
FG%	Field goal percentage	3P%	3-point field goal percentage	FT%	Free throw percentage
RPG	Rebounds per game	APG	Assists per game	SPG	Steals per game
BPG	Blocks per game	PPG	Points per game	**Bold**	Career high

=== NBA ===
==== Regular season ====
Year	Team	GP	GS	MPG	FG%	3P%	FT%	RPG	APG	SPG	BPG	PPG
1979–80	Philadelphia	23	0	5.4	.359	.143	.800	1.5	.5	.2	.2	2.4

==== Playoffs ====
Year	Team	GP	MPG	FG%	3P%	FT%	RPG	APG	SPG	BPG	PPG
1980	Philadelphia	4	1.5	.000	.000	–	.3	.3	.0	.0	.0
