= Glen Williams (basketball) =

American basketball player

Personal information
- Born: April 25, 1954 Saint Croix, U.S. Virgin Islands
- Died: May 9, 2017 (aged 63) New York City, New York, U.S.
- Listed height: 6 ft 3 in (1.91 m)
- Listed weight: 190 lb (86 kg)

Career information
- High school: Laurinburg Institute (Laurinburg, North Carolina)
- College: St. John's (1973–1977)
- NBA draft: 1977: 2nd round, 27th overall pick
- Drafted by: Milwaukee Bucks
- Position: Shooting guard

Career history
- 1978–1979: Tucson Gunners
- Stats at Basketball Reference

Glen Williams Jr. (April 25, 1954 – May 9, 2017) was an American professional basketball player.

== Early life ==
Williams was born in the U.S. Virgin Islands and raised in Charlotte Amalie, St. Thomas, where he played baseball as a child before a right arm injury led to him switching to basketball. When he was 15, Williams participated in the 1977 Centrobasket for the Virgin Islands national basketball team. He was the youngest member of the team. His high school basketball coach in the Virgin Islands was from North Carolina and arranged for Williams to transfer to Laurinburg Institute in Laurinburg, North Carolina. He averaged 30 points per game during his first season at Laurinburg and averaged 28 points the following season.

== College career ==
While playing for Laurinburg at Nassau Coliseum before a New York Nets game in 1973, Williams was noticed by Nets head coach Lou Carnesecca. When Carnesecca was hired as the St. John's Redmen head coach the following season, Williams joined the team, becoming a starter during his freshman season and staying in the starting lineup for his entire collegiate career. During his senior season as team captain, he scored 665 points, breaking the Redmen record for most points scored in a season. Williams ranks 10th in total points scored at St. John's. Carnesecca called him "one of the best two-way players we ever had here".

Williams was inducted into the St. John's Athletic Hall of Fame in 2000.

== Professional career ==
Williams was selected in the 1977 NBA draft by the Milwaukee Bucks as the 27th overall pick but never played in the National Basketball Association (NBA). Instead he played professionally in the Eastern Basketball Association (EBA) and the Western Basketball Association (WBA). Williams played for the Tucson Gunners of the WBA during the 1978–79 season.

== Death ==
Williams suffered from cancer for the last seven years of his life and died aged 63 in 2017.
