= List of Milwaukee Panthers men's basketball seasons =

These are the yearly results of the Milwaukee Panthers men's basketball team.

== Year-by-year (1956–present) ==
Record table
Season	Coach	Overall	Conference	Standing	Postseason
Milwaukee (Wisconsin Intercollegiate Athletic Conference) (1956–1964)
1956–1957	Russ Rebholz	12–7	7–5		
1957–1958	Russ Rebholz	13–7	7–5		
1958–1959	Russ Rebholz	17–4	11–2		
1959–1960	Russ Rebholz	18–4	10–2	1st	NCAA College Division Regional Third Place
1960–1961	Russ Rebholz	8–12	5–7		
1961–1962	Russ Rebholz	4–17	3–9		
1962–1963	Russ Rebholz	4–17	3–9		
1963–1964	Ray Krzoska	3–18	3–9		
Milwaukee (NCAA College Division Independent) (1964–1973)
1964–1965	Ray Krzoska	9–14			
1965–1966	Ray Krzoska	15–10			
1966–1967	Ray Krzoska	14–11			
1967–1968	Ray Krzoska	16–11			
1968–1969	Ray Krzoska	15–11			
1969–1970	Ray Krzoska	14–2			
1970–1971	Charles Parsley	13–10			
1971–1972	Charles Parsley	15–11			
1972–1973	Charles Parsley	18–8			
Milwaukee (NCAA Division I Independent) (1973–1980)
1973–1974	Bill Klucas	14–12			
1974–1975	Bill Klucas	8–18			
1975–1976	Bob Gottlieb	11–15			
1976–1977	Bob Gottlieb	19–8			
1977–1978	Bob Gottlieb	15–12			
1978–1979	Bob Gottlieb	8–18			
1979–1980	Bob Gottlieb	9–17			
Milwaukee (NCAA Division III Independent) (1980–1985)
1980–1981	Bob Voight	13–13			
1981–1982	Bob Voight	20–6			NCAA Division III Regional Third Place
1982–1983	Bob Voight	18–6			
1983–1984	Ray Swatella	6–20			
1984–1985	Ray Swatella	9–17			
Milwaukee (NAIA Independent) (1985–1987)
1985–1986	Ray Swatella	10–17			
1986–1987	Ray Swatella	8–20			
Milwaukee (NCAA Division II Independent) (1987–1990)
1987–1988	Steve Antrim	16–12			
1988–1989	Steve Antrim	24–7			NCAA Division II Elite 8
1989–1990	Steve Antrim	10–18			
Milwaukee (NCAA Division I Independent) (1990–1993)
1990–1991	Steve Antrim	18–10			
1991–1992	Steve Antrim	20–8			
1992–1993	Steve Antrim	23–4			
Milwaukee (Summit League) (1993–1994)
1993–1994	Steve Antrim	10–17	7–11	8th	
Milwaukee (Horizon League) (1994–Present)
1994–1995	Steve Antrim	3–24	2–13	11th	
1995–1996	Ric Cobb	9–18	5–11	6th	
1996–1997	Ric Cobb	8–20	4–12	9th	
1997–1998	Ric Cobb	3–24	2–12	8th	
1998–1999	Ric Cobb	8–19	5–9	6th	
1999–2000	Bo Ryan	15–14	6–8	4th	
2000–2001	Bo Ryan	15–13	7–7	5th	
2001–2002	Bruce Pearl	16–13	11–5	3rd	
2002–2003	Bruce Pearl	24–8	13–3	2nd	NCAA Round of 64
2003–2004	Bruce Pearl	20–11	13–3	1st	NIT 1st Round
2004–2005	Bruce Pearl	26–6	14–2	1st	NCAA Sweet Sixteen
2005–2006	Rob Jeter	22–9	12–4	1st	NCAA Round of 32
2006–2007	Rob Jeter	9–22	6–10	7th	
2007–2008	Rob Jeter	14–16	9–9	4th	
2008–2009	Rob Jeter	17–14	11–7	5th	
2009–2010	Rob Jeter	20–14	10–8	4th	
2010–2011	Rob Jeter	19–14	13–5	1st	NIT 1st Round
2011–2012	Rob Jeter	20–14	11–7	4th	CBI 1st Round
2012–2013	Rob Jeter	8–24	3–13	9th	
2013–2014	Rob Jeter	21–13	7–9	5th	NCAA Round of 64
2014–2015	Rob Jeter	14–16	9–7	5th	
2015–2016	Rob Jeter	20–13	10–8	5th	
2016–2017	LaVall Jordan	11–24	4–14	10th	
2017–2018	Pat Baldwin	16–17	8–10	6th	
2018–2019	Pat Baldwin	9–22	4–14	10th	
2019–2020	Pat Baldwin	12–19	7–11	T–7th	
2020–2021	Pat Baldwin	10–12	7–10	8th	
2021–2022	Pat Baldwin	10–21	8–14	9th	
2022–2023	Bart Lundy	22–12	14–6	T–2nd	CBI Quarterfinals
2023–2024	Bart Lundy	20–15	12–8	T–5th	
2024–2025	Bart Lundy	21–11	14–6	T–2nd	
2025–2026	Bart Lundy	12–20	8–12	T–8th	
Total:		1,481–1,410–1 (.512)			
National champion Postseason invitational champion Conference regular season champion Conference regular season and conference tournament champion Division regular season champion Division regular season and conference tournament champion Conference tournament champion
