= 1977–78 Golden State Warriors season =

NBA professional basketball team season

- Head coach: Al Attles
- General manager: Al Attles
- Owner: Franklin Mieuli
- Arena: Oakland-Alameda County Coliseum Arena

Results
- Record: 43–39 (.524)
- Place: Division: 5th (Pacific); Conference: 7th (Western)
- Playoff finish: Did not qualify
- Stats at Basketball Reference

Local media
- Television: KTVU
- Radio: KNBR

The 1977–78 Golden State Warriors season was the Golden State Warriors' 32nd season in the NBA and 15th in the San Francisco Bay Area.

== Draft picks ==
Round	Pick	Player	Position	Nationality	College
1	16	Rickey Green	PG	United States	Michigan
1	18	Wesley Cox	SF	United States	Louisville
2	38	Ricky Love		United States	Alabama-Huntsville
3	60	Marlon Redmond		United States	San Francisco
4	82	Roy Smith		United States	Kentucky State
4	87	Leartha Scott		United States	Wisconsin-Parkside
5	104	Ray Epps	F	United States	Norfolk State
6	126	Jack Phelan	F	United States	Saint Francis
7	146	Jerry Thurston		United States	Mercer
8	165	Ricky Marsh		United States	Manhattan

== Roster ==
1977–78 Golden State Warriors roster
Players

Pos.	No.	Player	Height	Weight	DOB	From
SF	24	Rick Barry	6 ft 7 in (2.01 m)	205 lb (93 kg)	1944-03-28	Miami (FL)
PF	12	E. C. Coleman	6 ft 8 in (2.03 m)	225 lb (102 kg)	1950-09-25	Houston Baptist
SF	41	Wesley Cox	6 ft 6 in (1.98 m)	215 lb (98 kg)	1955-01-27	Louisville
PG	15	Charles Dudley	6 ft 2 in (1.88 m)	180 lb (82 kg)	1950-03-05	Washington
PG	25	Rickey Green	6 ft 0 in (1.83 m)	170 lb (77 kg)	1954-08-18	Michigan
SG	21	Ricky Marsh	6 ft 3 in (1.91 m)	200 lb (91 kg)	1954-03-10	Manhattan
C	00	Robert Parish	7 ft 0 in (2.13 m)	230 lb (104 kg)	1953-08-30	Centenary
SF	22	Sonny Parker	6 ft 6 in (1.98 m)	200 lb (91 kg)	1955-03-22	Texas A&M
C	44	Clifford Ray	6 ft 9 in (2.06 m)	230 lb (104 kg)	1949-01-21	Oklahoma
SG	20	Phil Smith	6 ft 4 in (1.93 m)	185 lb (84 kg)	1952-04-22	San Francisco
SG	33	Nate Williams	6 ft 5 in (1.96 m)	215 lb (98 kg)	1950-05-02	Utah State

Coaches
Head coach
- Al Attles
Assistant(s)
- Joe Roberts

Legend
- (DP) Unsigned draft pick
- (FA) Free agent
- (S) Suspended
- Injured

Roster
Updated: February 17, 1978

== Regular season ==
=== Season standings ===
Pacific Division	W	L	PCT	GB	Home	Road	Div
y-Portland Trail Blazers	58	24	.707	–	36–5	22–19	13–3
x-Phoenix Suns	49	33	.598	9	34–7	15–26	8–8
x-Seattle SuperSonics	47	35	.573	11	31–10	16–25	8–8
x-Los Angeles Lakers	45	37	.549	13	29–12	16–25	6–10
Golden State Warriors	43	39	.524	15	30–11	13–28	5–11

#	Western Conference				
#	Team	W	L	PCT	GB
1	z-Portland Trail Blazers	58	24	.707	–
2	y-Denver Nuggets	48	34	.585	10
3	x-Phoenix Suns	49	33	.598	9
4	x-Seattle SuperSonics	47	35	.573	11
5	x-Los Angeles Lakers	45	37	.549	13
6	x-Milwaukee Bucks	44	38	.537	14
7	Golden State Warriors	43	39	.524	15
8	Chicago Bulls	40	42	.488	18
9	Detroit Pistons	38	44	.463	20
10	Indiana Pacers	31	51	.378	27
11	Kansas City Kings	31	51	.378	27

z – clinched division title
y – clinched division title
x – clinched playoff spot

== Awards and records ==
- E.C. Coleman, NBA All-Defensive Second Team
- Rick Barry, NBA All-Star Game
