= Larry Moffett =

American basketball player

Personal information
- Born: November 5, 1954 Mobile, Alabama, U.S.
- Died: May 2, 2011 (aged 56) Shreveport, Louisiana, U.S.
- Listed height: 6 ft 8 in (2.03 m)
- Listed weight: 210 lb (95 kg)

Career information
- High school: Horace Mann (Gary, Indiana)
- College: Murray State (1974–1975); Compton JC (1975–1976); UNLV (1976–1977)
- NBA draft: 1977: 2nd round, 34th overall pick
- Drafted by: Houston Rockets
- Playing career: 1977–1986
- Position: Small forward
- Number: 41

Career history
- 1977–1978: Houston Rockets
- 1978–1979: Juvecaserta
- 1979–1980: Hawaii Volcanos
- 1980: Nicholas Stoodley
- 1981–1982: Montana Golden Nuggets
- 1982–1983: Vichy
- 1983–1984: FL Forlì
- 1984–1985: Brugge
- 1985–1987: Gijón Baloncesto

Career highlights
- PBA champion (1980 Invitational)

Career statistics
- Points: 16
- Rebounds: 21
- Assists: 7
- Stats at NBA.com
- Stats at Basketball Reference

Larry Moffett (November 5, 1954 – May 2, 2011) was an American basketball player who played for Horace Mann High, Gary, Indiana (1973 only), Murray State University (1973–75), Compton Community College (1975–76) and the University of Nevada, Las Vegas (1976–77), before being drafted by the Houston Rockets in the 1977 NBA draft. However, he played only one NBA season, and appeared in a total of 20 games.

Moffett played two seasons in the Continental Basketball Association for the Hawaii Volcanos and Montana Golden Nuggets.

== Career statistics ==
Legend
GP	Games played	GS	Games started	MPG	Minutes per game
FG%	Field goal percentage	3P%	3-point field goal percentage	FT%	Free throw percentage
RPG	Rebounds per game	APG	Assists per game	SPG	Steals per game
BPG	Blocks per game	PPG	Points per game	**Bold**	Career high

=== NBA ===
==== Regular season ====
Year	Team	GP	MPG	FG%	FT%	RPG	APG	SPG	BPG	PPG
1977–78	Houston	20	5.5	.294	.600	1.1	.4	.1	.1	.8
