= 2005–06 Wright State Raiders men's basketball team =

American college basketball season

2005–06 Wright State Raiders men's basketball
- Conference: Horizon League
- Record: 13–15 (8–8 Horizon League)
- Head coach: Paul Biancardi (3rd season)
- Assistant coaches: Ed Huckaby, Brian Donoher; John Fitzpatrick
- Home arena: Nutter Center

2005–06 Horizon League men's basketball standings
	Conf.				Overall
Team	W		L	PCT	W		L	PCT
Milwaukee †	12	–	4	.750	22	–	9	.710
Butler	11	–	5	.688	20	–	13	.606
Loyola (IL)	8	–	8	.500	19	–	11	.633
UIC	8	–	8	.500	16	–	15	.516
Detroit	8	–	8	.500	16	–	16	.500
Green Bay	8	–	8	.500	15	–	16	.484
Wright State	8	–	8	.500	13	–	15	.464
Cleveland State	5	–	11	.313	10	–	18	.357
Youngstown State	4	–	12	.250	7	–	21	.250
† 2006 Horizon League Tournament winner As of August 1, 2010; Rankings from AP Poll

The 2005–06 Wright State Raiders men's basketball team represented Wright State University in the 2005–06 NCAA Division I men's basketball season led by head coach Paul Biancardi.

== Season summary ==
For the first time in three seasons the Wright State Raiders began the year as an experienced team. They returned six upperclassmen, including three major contributors, and three sophomores who had played significant time as freshmen. This season also saw the opening of a dedicated basketball practice facility, the Mills Morgan Center / Setzer Pavilion.

The season was up and down. It featured impressive wins against both regular season champion Milwaukee and runner-up Butler. It included a frustrating 1-5 record against Mid American Conference teams. There was a four game winning streak and two four game losing streaks. The Raiders had a chance for more, but 1-3 to end Horizon League play put them in a five-way tie for third place.

They exited the Horizon League Tournament early at 6th seed Illinois-Chicago, however the spirited comeback gave supporters reason for optimism about the future of their team.

Ultimately, that future would be with a new head coach.

=== Aftermath ===
Coach Paul Biancardi's coaching career would be unceremoniously cut short by a recruiting scandal from his time at Ohio State.

Wright State had hired Biancardi in part due to his association with the very successful program that Jim O’Brien was leading at Ohio State. This turned into a liability just a year later when O’Brien was fired by Ohio State due to an ongoing NCAA recruiting violation investigation. Biancardi had been O’Briens recruiting coordinator.

Biancardi’s second and final, third year at Wright State were then spent under the cloud of the investigation.

Because Ohio State has a large national following, the story was a media sensation with regular updates both in Dayton and nationally. Both O’Brien and Biancardi disputed that violations had occurred, and O’Brien eventually won damages for wrongful termination.

On March 10, 2006 the NCAA issued its report on the situation and cited failings by O’Brien, Biancardi and The Ohio State University. Biancardi was given a “show cause” penalty, which would prevent him from performing his recruiting duties for a period of about 18 months. Effectively this meant that he could no longer serve as an NCAA basketball coach.

For the second time in ten years Wright State had lost a respected basketball coach to a public scandal, and for the third time Athletic Director Mike Cusack would search for a new basketball coach.

== Roster Changes ==
=== Joining ===
- Tyrone Scott (G) from Schoolcraft Community College.
- Walter Chancellor (F) from Wabash Valley Junior College.
- Robert Eldridge (G) a recruit from Richmond.
- James Craft (C) recruited from Mercerburg Academy.

=== Leaving ===
- Zakee Boyd left for "a change in scenery."
- Lorenzo Shine transferred to seek more playing time.

== Roster ==
2005–06 Wright State Raiders men's basketball team
Players
Coaches

Pos.	#	Name	Height	Weight	Year	Previous school	Hometown
G	11	Jaron Taylor	6 ft 1 in (1.85 m)	205 lb (93 kg)	Sr	Cantonsville CC	Baltimore, MD
G	1	DaShaun Wood	5 ft 11 in (1.8 m)	180 lb (82 kg)	Jr	Crockett	Detroit, MI
F	4	Drew Burleson	6 ft 6 in (1.98 m)	220 lb (100 kg)	Jr	Wheelersburg	Wheelersburg, OH
G	22	Tyrone Scott	6 ft 3 in (1.91 m)	180 lb (82 kg)	Jr	Schoolcraft CC	Detroit, MI
G	24	Reinaldo Smith	6 ft 2 in (1.88 m)	180 lb (82 kg)	Jr	Fairborn	Dayton, OH
F	52	Walter Chancellor	6 ft 5 in (1.96 m)	270 lb (122 kg)	Jr	Walbash CC	Cincinnati, OH
F	2	Scott Wilson	6 ft 6 in (1.98 m)	215 lb (98 kg)	RS So	Cincinnati State CC	Middletown, OH
G	3	Everett Spencer	6 ft 5 in (1.96 m)	185 lb (84 kg)	So	New Creations	Columbus, OH
F	23	Parysh Munroe	6 ft 5 in (1.96 m)	255 lb (116 kg)	So	Massanutten	Freeport, Bahamas
F	50	Jordan Pleiman	6 ft 8 in (2.03 m)	240 lb (109 kg)	So	Fort Loramie	Fort Loramie, OH
G	5	Robert Eldridge	6 ft 1 in (1.85 m)	210 lb (95 kg)	Fr	New Creations	Gary, IN
C	32	James Craft	6 ft 10 in (2.08 m)	215 lb (98 kg)	Fr	Mercerburg	Youngstown, OH
G	34	William Graham	6 ft 2 in (1.88 m)	180 lb (82 kg)	RS Fr	Catholic	Lexington, KY

Head coach

- Paul Biancardi

Assistant coach(es)

Ed Huckaby, Brian Donoher, John Fitzpatrick

Legend

- (C) Team captain
- (S) Suspended
- (I) Ineligible
- (W) Walk-on
- Injured
- Current redshirt

== Schedule and results ==
Date time, TV	Rank^{#}	Opponent^{#}	Result	Record	Site city, state
Nov 19, 2005*		at Belmont	L 80-86	0-1	Curb Event Center (2,483); Nashville, TN
Nov 23, 2005*		at Toledo	L 53-64	0–2	Savage Arena (2,998); Toledo, OH
Nov 26, 2005*		Ball State	L 50-71	0–3	Nutter Center (7,383); Fairborn, OH
Nov 30, 2005*		at Miami Ohio	L 46-54	0-4	Millett Assembly Hall (3,867); Oxford, Ohio
Dec 7, 2005		Detroit Mercy	W 69–58	1-4 (1-0)	Nutter Center (5,035); Fairborn, OH
Dec 13, 2005*		at Northern Illinois	L 42-62	1-5	Chick Evans Field House (1,019); DeKalb, IL
Dec 17, 2005*		Belmont	W 87-79	2-5	Nutter Center (3,325); Fairborn, OH
Dec 22, 2005*		Texas-Pan American	W 63-53	3–5	Nutter Center (3,501); Fairborn, OH
Dec 27, 2005*		Northeastern	W 72-65	4–5	Nutter Center (3,456); Fairborn, OH
Dec 31, 2005*		at Akron	L 44-72	4-6	JAR Arena (2,741); Akron, OH
Jan 5, 2006		at Cleveland State	W 58-55	5-6 (2–0)	Wolstein Center (1,742); Cleveland, OH
Jan 7, 2006		Loyola	W 77-63	6-6 (3–0)	Nutter Center (7,923); Fairborn, OH
Jan 9, 2006*		Kenyon	W 88-47	7-6	Nutter Center (3,503); Fairborn, OH
Jan 12, 2006		at Youngstown State	W 64-60	8-6 (4-0)	Beeghly Center (2,677); Youngstown, OH
Jan 19, 2006		at Green Bay	L 44-57	8-7 (4–1)	Resch Center (5,316); Ashwaubenon, WI
Jan 21, 2006		at Milwaukee	L 54-61	8-8 (4–2)	UW–Milwaukee Panther Arena (6,637); Milwaukee, WI
Jan 25, 2006		UIC	L 57-62	8-9 (4–3)	Nutter Center (4,029); Fairborn, OH
Jan 28, 2006		at Butler	L 62-70	8-10 (4–4)	Hinkle Fieldhouse (6,654); Indianapolis
Jan 30, 2006		Youngstown State	W 81-67	9-10 (5–4)	Nutter Center (3,741); Fairborn, OH
Feb 2, 2006		Milwaukee	W 59-54	10-10 (6-4)	Nutter Center (6,595); Fairborn, OH
Feb 4, 2006		Green Bay	W 59-49	11-10 (7–4)	Nutter Center (5,032); Fairborn, OH
Feb 8, 2006		at Detroit Mercy	L 66–70	11-11 (7-5)	Calihan Hall (1,749); Detroit, MI
Feb 11, 2006		Butler	W 86-83	12–11 (8–5)	Nutter Center (7,029); Fairborn, OH
Feb 15, 2006		Cleveland State	L 56-63	12-12 (8–6)	Nutter Center (5,041); Fairborn, OH
Feb 18, 2006*		at Bowling Green	W 70-51	13–12	Anderson Arena (2,835); Bowling Green, OH
Feb 22, 2006		at Loyola	L 63-76	13-13 (8–7)	Gentile Event Center (2,017); Chicago, IL
Feb 25, 2006		at UIC	L 66-69	13-14 (8–8)	UIC Pavilion (4,497); Chicago, IL
Midwestern Collegiate Tournament
Feb 28, 2006	(7)	at (6) UIC; First Round	L 64-77	13-15	UIC Pavilion (916); Chicago, IL
*Non-conference game. ^{#}Rankings from AP Poll. (#) Tournament seedings in parentheses. MW=Midwest.

== Awards and honors ==
DaShaun Wood	First Team All Horizon League + Horizon League All-Defensive Team

== Statistics ==
Number	Name	Games	Average	Points	Assists	Rebounds
00	DaShaun Wood	28	17.9	502	131	126
4	Drew Burleson	28	12.5	350	42	144
50	Jordan Pleiman	28	10.5	295	5	188
22	Tyrone Scott	24	6.8	162	20	47
11	Jaron Taylor	28	4.4	122	61	65
2	Scottie Wilson	26	3.4	89	7	71
34	William Graham	28	2.7	76	59	52
52	Walter Chancellor	27	2.6	69	2	72
3	Everett Spencer	22	2.7	60	14	23
24	Reinaldo Smith	14	2.1	29	5	13
23	Parysh Munroe	14	1.1	16	1	13
32	James Craft	18	0.4	8	0	8
5	Robert Eldridge	18	0.2	2	3	3
