= Herb Brown =

American basketball coach

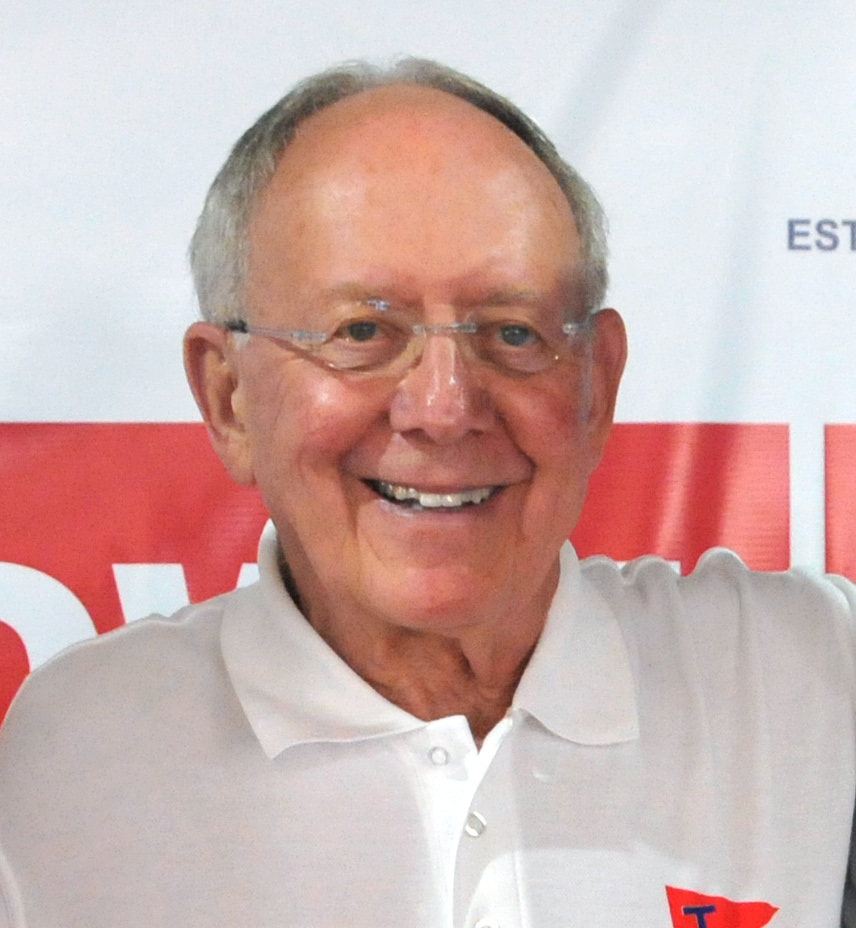

Personal information
- Born: March 14, 1936 (age 90) Brooklyn, New York, U.S.
- Education: University of Vermont
- Years active: 1960–2015

Sport
- Country: United States
- Sport: basketball
- Position: Assistant coach / head coach
- Team: C.W. Post Pioneers (1960–64, 1972–74) Stony Brook Warriors/Patriots (1964–69); Pakistan national basketball team (1972); Gallitos de Isabela (1974–76, 1980–82); Israel Sabras (1975); Detroit Pistons (1975–78); Tucson Gunners (1978–79); Mets de Guaynabo (1979); Houston Rockets (assistant) (1980–81); Indios de Canóvanas (1982–83) Puerto Rico Coquis (1983–85); Cincinnati Slammers (1985–87); Phoenix Suns (assistant) (1987–88); Joventut Badalona (1988–89); Taugres (1990–92); Valencia (1995); Indiana Pacers (assistant) (1995–96); Baltimore Bayrunners (1999–2000); Philadelphia 76ers (assistant) (2001–02); Portland Trail Blazers (assistant) (2002–03); Detroit Pistons (assistant) (2003–04); Atlanta Hawks (assistant) (2004–07); Charlotte Bobcats (assistant) (2008–2011) Portland Pilots (assistant) (2014–15)
Medal record
Bronze medal – third place	1997 Maccabiah Games	Team
Gold medal – first place	2001 Maccabiah Games	Team
Bronze medal – third place	2005 Maccabiah Games	Team
Gold medal – first place	2013 FIBA Asia Championships	Team
- Updated on 24 January 2017

Herbert Michael Brown (born March 14, 1936) is an American basketball coach and the brother of Hall of Fame coach Larry Brown. He is the former head coach of the Detroit Pistons (1976–78).

== Career ==
Brown succeeded Ray Scott when he was promoted from assistant to head coach of a Detroit Pistons team that was at 17–25 on January 26, 1976. The 39-year-old Brown went 19–21 in his first season with the Pistons who won 10 of their last 11 games of the regular season. He then guided the team into the second round of the NBA playoffs where the Pistons lost to Golden State, four games to two.

The following season, the Pistons went 44–38 under Brown, before losing in the first round of the playoffs to the Golden State Warriors.

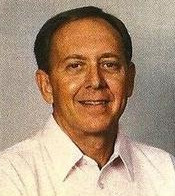
Brown in 1987

The Pistons fired Brown on December 15, 1977, after a 9–15 start to the 1977–78 NBA season, replacing him with the team's 32-year-old general manager, Bob Kauffman, who went 29–29 as head coach.

In 1978, Brown was named head coach of the Tucson Gunners, a franchise in the newly formed Western Basketball Association (WBA). He was named WBA Coach of the Year after guiding the team to a 32–16 record and the league championship, where Tucson beat Reno (which was coached by Bill Musselman), four games to three.

Brown was head coach of the Puerto Rico Coquis of the Continental Basketball Association (CBA) from 1983 to 1985, going 28–16 and 27–21, in 1983–84 and 1984–85, respectively. He earned CBA Coach of the Year honors following the 1983–84 season. He also coached the Cincinnati Slammers of the CBA in 1985–86.

In June 1990, Brown was named head coach and vice president of basketball operations for the Baltimore BayRunners of the International Basketball League (IBL). He was fired after going 10–20 in the team's inaugural season. The BayRunners won just seven more games after firing Brown to finish the season at 17–47.

The Charlotte Bobcats of the NBA were Brown's fourth team on which he had served under brother Larry, including the Indiana Pacers. Together, they helped coach the Pistons to the NBA championship in 2004, and led the Philadelphia 76ers to the 2001 NBA Finals.

Brown has also served as an assistant coach for several other teams, including the Portland Trail Blazers, Houston Rockets, Indiana Pacers, Phoenix Suns, and Atlanta Hawks. He also coached overseas, most notably in Spain in the early 1990s.

At the college level, Brown was head basketball coach at Stony Brook University from 1964 to 1969, earning Coach of the Year honors following the 1969 season.

Brown served as head coach at C.W. Post (of Long Island University) from 1972 to 1974, going 21–5 and 13–12 over two seasons.

His final coaching job was as an assistant at the University of Portland for the 2014–15 season.

== Head coaching record ==
=== College ===
Record table
Season	Coach	Overall	Conference	Standing	Postseason
Stony Brook Seawolves (Independent/Knickerbocker) (1964–1969)
1964–65	Stony Brook	6–9			
1965–66	Stony Brook	5–14			
1966–67	Stony Brook	9–10			
1967–68	Stony Brook	7–15	3–4		
1968–69	Stony Brook	16–9	7–2		
1968–69	Stony Brook	16–9	7–2		
1969–70	Stony Brook	16–9	7–2		
Stony Brook Seawolves:		–	24–10		
C.W. Post Pioneers (Independent) (1972–1974)
1972–73	C.W. Post	21–5			
1973–74	C.W. Post	13–12			
Total:		– (–)			
National champion Postseason invitational champion Conference regular season champion Conference regular season and conference tournament champion Division regular season champion Division regular season and conference tournament champion Conference tournament champion

=== NBA ===
Legend
Regular season	G	Games coached	W	Games won	L	Games lost	W–L %	Win–loss %
Playoffs	PG	Playoff games	PW	Playoff wins	PL	Playoff losses	PW–L %	Playoff win–loss %

Team	Year	G	W	L	W–L%	Finish	PG	PW	PL	PW–L%	Result
Detroit	1975–76	40	19	21	.475	2nd in Midwest	9	4	5	.444	Lost in Conf. Semifinals
Detroit	1976–77	82	44	38	.537	2nd in Midwest	3	1	2	.333	Lost in First round
Detroit	1977–78	24	9	15	.375	(fired)	—	—	—	—	—
Career		146	72	74	.493		12	5	7	.417	

=== WBA ===
Team	Year	G	W	L	W-L%	Finish	PG	PW	PL	PW-L%	Postseason
Tucson Gunners	1978-79	48	32	16	.667	1st	7	4	3	.571	Won Championship

=== CBA ===
Team	Year	G	W	L	W-L%	Finish	PG	PW	PL	PW-L%	Postseason
Puerto Rico Coquis	1983–84	44	28	16	.636	—	—	—	—	—	—
Puerto Rico Coquis	1984–85	48	27	21	.563	—	—	—	—	—	—
Cincinnati Slammers	1985-86	48	33	15	.688	1st West Div.	15	9	6	.600	Lost Western finals
Cincinnati Slammers	1986-87	48	25	23	.521	2nd West Div	9	5	6	.455	Lost Western finals

=== IBL ===
Team	Year	G	W	L	W-L%	Finish	PG	PW	PL	PW-L%	Postseason
Baltimore BayRunners	1999	30	10	20	.333	(fired)	—	—	—	—	—

== Personal life and education ==
Born in Brooklyn, New York, Brown is a graduate of the University of Vermont. The author of three books about basketball, he runs a Basketball Academy in the summer at the New Jersey Y Camps. In 2006, he was inducted into the National Jewish Sports Hall of Fame and Museum.

Brown now lives in Portland, Oregon, with his wife. He has two children—in Charlotte and Atlanta—and two stepchildren.
