= Al Smith (basketball) =

American basketball player (1947–2022)

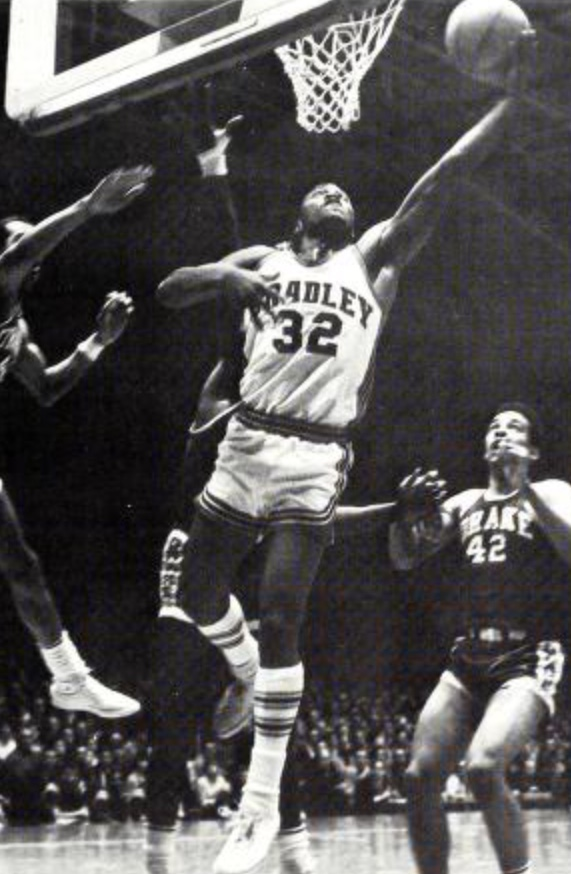
- Smith at Bradley during the 1967–68 season

Personal information
- Born: January 15, 1947 Peoria, Illinois, U.S.
- Died: December 19, 2022 (aged 75) Palmer Ranch, Florida, U.S.
- Listed height: 6 ft 1 in (1.85 m)
- Listed weight: 185 lb (84 kg)

Career information
- High school: Manual (Peoria, Illinois)
- College: Bradley (1966–1968, 1970–1971)
- NBA draft: 1971: 11th round, 180th overall pick
- Drafted by: Chicago Bulls
- Playing career: 1971–1976
- Position: Point guard
- Number: 10, 20

Career history
- 1971–1974: Denver Rockets
- 1974–1975: Utah Stars
- 1978-1979: Tucson Gunners

Career highlights
- ABA assists leader (1974); 2× First-team All-MVC (1968, 1971)

Career ABA statistics
- Points: 3,298 (9.8 ppg)
- Assists: 1,793 (5.3 apg)
- Rebounds: 865 (2.6 rpg)
- Stats at Basketball Reference

Alan Otis Smith (January 15, 1947 – December 19, 2022) was an American basketball player who played for five seasons in the American Basketball Association (ABA). A point guard during his career, he played for the Denver Rockets and Utah Stars and once led the ABA in assists in a season.

== Early life ==
Smith was born in Peoria, Illinois. He also attended Manual High School in Peoria. Smith played basketball, football, and baseball at Manual, earning All-State honors in all three sports. His baseball skill was such that the Chicago White Sox drafted him in the 7th round of the inaugural Major League Baseball draft in 1965. Instead of signing with the White Sox, he opted to attend college.

Smith was given offers to attend USC and Notre Dame, but he chose to attend Bradley University as a basketball and baseball player. Smith spent four years at Bradley, though his time in college was interrupted by a two-year stint in the United States Army. As a college basketball player, he scored over 1,000 points for Bradley and was named first team All-Missouri Valley Conference in 1971 during his senior season. His college success was honored in 2004 when he was selected to Bradley's All-Century team.

== Denver Rockets ==
In 1971, Smith was drafted by the National Basketball Association's Chicago Bulls in the 11th round of the NBA draft; previously, he was also drafted by the Bulls in the 10th round of the 1969 draft. He was also a 4th round draft pick of the American Basketball Association's Denver Rockets (now the NBA's Nuggets) in a separate draft. Smith chose to sign with the Rockets, and he would go on to play for the club for three seasons. In his first season, he served as the backup to point guard Larry Brown while averaging nine points and three assists per game.

Smith became the Rockets' regular point guard during the 1972–1973 season after Brown took a job as head coach. He scored a career-best eleven-plus points per game in his second season, while averaging five-and-a-half assists per game. His scoring decreased slightly in the 1973–1974 season but he went on to average eight assists per game, and would lead the ABA in assists.

== Utah Stars ==
Before the 1974–1975 season, Smith was traded to the Utah Stars in exchange for a draft pick and cash. In his first season with the Stars, he averaged a career-low eight points per game, while also averaging four-and-a-half assists per contest.

His second season with the Stars lasted only fifteen games before the Stars folded in December. A persistent knee injury eventually ended his career after five seasons. He retired having scored over 3,200 points and having dished out over 1,700 assists.

== Tucson Gunners ==
For the Western Basketball Association, Smith played for the Tucson Gunners in its first and only season from 1978 to 1979.

== Post-basketball life ==
Smith went on to become a social worker in Denver, also working at a cable television supply company. For a year-and-a-half, he served as an assistant head coach at Manual High School, helping lead the school to two state championships. As of 2007, Smith was working in Paterson, New Jersey, as a school counselor.

=== Death ===
On December 19, 2022, police were called to Smith's apartment in Palmer Ranch, Florida, after he shot his live-in girlfriend. After law enforcement tried to make contact with Smith, it was discovered that he had committed suicide via a self-inflicted gunshot. He was 75.
