= Ricky Brown (basketball) =

Retired American basketball player

Personal information
- Born: March 29, 1955 (age 71) Gadsden, Alabama, U.S.
- Listed height: 6 ft 9 in (2.06 m)
- Listed weight: 190 lb (86 kg)

Career information
- High school: Gadsden High School
- College: Alabama (1973–1977)
- NBA draft: 1977: 3rd round, 63rd overall pick
- Drafted by: Portland Trail Blazers
- Playing career: 1977–1988
- Position: Center
- Number: 12

Career history
- ?: Harlem Globetrotters
- 1986–1988: Hapoel Jerusalem
- Stats at Basketball Reference

Ricky Brown (born March 29, 1955) is an American former basketball player who played collegiately for the Crimson Tide of the University of Alabama and was selected by the Portland Trail Blazers in the third round (63rd pick overall) of the 1977 NBA draft. He played professionally for the Harlem Globetrotters and Hapoel Jerusalem of the Israeli National League (1986–88).
