= Mike Garland =

American basketball coach

Biographical details
- Born: May 31, 1954 (age 72)

Coaching career (HC unless noted)
- 1996–2003: Michigan State (asst.)
- 2003–2006: Cleveland State
- 2006–2007: SMU (asst.)
- 2007–2021: Michigan State (asst.)
- 2021–2022: Michigan State (special asst. to the HC)

Head coaching record
- Overall: 23–60 (.277)

Mike Garland (born May 31, 1954) is an American former head college basketball coach at Cleveland State University. Before being named head coach at Cleveland State he was an assistant at Michigan State under current head coach Tom Izzo. Before coaching Garland was a teammate of Tom Izzo's on the basketball team at Northern Michigan University. He was named Cleveland State head coach on April 17, 2003. He was relieved of his coaching duties on March 31, 2006. Garland spent one year as an assistant coach at SMU under head coach Matt Doherty, before rejoining the Michigan State basketball staff in 2007 as an assistant coach, and later the special assistant to the head coach in 2021. Garland announced his retirement from Michigan State on June 9, 2022.

== Head coaching record ==
Record table
Season	Team	Overall	Conference	Standing	Postseason
Cleveland State Vikings (Horizon League) (2003–2006)
2003–04	Cleveland State	4–25	0–16	9th	
2004–05	Cleveland State	9–17	6–10	8th	
2005–06	Cleveland State	10–18	5–11	8th	
Cleveland State:		23–60 (.277)	11–37 (.229)		
Total:		23–60 (.277)			
National champion Postseason invitational champion Conference regular season champion Conference regular season and conference tournament champion Division regular season champion Division regular season and conference tournament champion Conference tournament champion
