= Ricky Marsh =

American basketball player

Personal information
- Born: March 10, 1954 New York City, New York
- Listed height: 6 ft 3 in (1.91 m)
- Listed weight: 200 lb (91 kg)

Career information
- High school: Jamaica (Jamaica, New York)
- College: Nebraska (1972–1974); Manhattan (1975–1977)
- NBA draft: 1977: 16th round, 165th overall pick
- Drafted by: Golden State Warriors
- Position: Shooting guard
- Number: 21

Career history
- 1977–1978: Golden State Warriors
- Stats at NBA.com
- Stats at Basketball Reference

Eric Clifton "Ricky" Marsh (born March 10, 1954) is a retired American professional basketball player. He played a total of 60 National Basketball Association (NBA) games.

In 2006, Ricky Marsh was inducted into the Manhattan College Athletic Hall of Fame. "Ricky Marsh ’77 Enjoyed an outstanding two-year career at Manhattan after transferring from Nebraska. A Dean’s List student, Marsh was named All-Metropolitan as a junior. While serving as a co-captain as a senior, he received the Doc Sweeney Award as MVP of the annual game with Fordham, and was selected to play in the Big Apple Classic. Drafted by the Golden State Warriors in the eighth round of the 1977 NBA Draft, Marsh started 50 of the 60 games he appeared in and leads all Jaspers in games played in the NBA."

== Career statistics ==
Legend
GP	Games played	GS	Games started	MPG	Minutes per game
FG%	Field goal percentage	3P%	3-point field goal percentage	FT%	Free throw percentage
RPG	Rebounds per game	APG	Assists per game	SPG	Steals per game
BPG	Blocks per game	PPG	Points per game	**Bold**	Career high

=== NBA ===
==== Regular season ====
Year	Team	GP	MPG	FG%	FT%	RPG	APG	SPG	BPG	PPG
1977–78	Golden State	60	14.2	.426	.697	1.3	1.5	.5	.3	4.5
