= 1977 NBA draft =

Basketball player selection

General information
- Sport: Basketball
- Date: June 10, 1977
- Location: Madison Square Garden (New York City, New York)

Overview
- 170 total selections in 8 rounds
- League: NBA
- First selection: Kent Benson, Milwaukee Bucks
- Hall of Famers: 3: G Walter Davis; F Bernard King; F Jack Sikma

The 1977 NBA draft was the 31st annual draft of the National Basketball Association (NBA). The draft was held on June 10, 1977, before the 1977–78 season. In this draft, 22 NBA teams took turns selecting amateur U.S. college basketball players and other eligible players, including international players. The first two picks in the draft belonged to the teams that finished last in each conference, with the order determined by a coin flip.

The Milwaukee Bucks won the coin flip and were awarded the first overall pick, while the Kansas City Kings, who obtained the New York Nets first-round pick in a trade, were awarded the second pick. The remaining first-round picks and the subsequent rounds were assigned to teams in reverse order of their win–loss record in the previous season. A player who had finished his four-year college eligibility was eligible for selection. If a player left college early, he would not be eligible for selection until his college class graduated. Before the draft, six college underclassmen were declared eligible for selection under the "hardship" rule. These players had applied and gave evidence of financial hardship to the league, which granted them the right to start earning their living by starting their professional careers earlier.

Four former American Basketball Association (ABA) franchises who joined the NBA when both leagues merged, the Denver Nuggets, the Indiana Pacers, the New York Nets and the San Antonio Spurs, took part in the NBA Draft for the first time. Prior to the start of the season, the Nets relocated to New Jersey and became the New Jersey Nets, meaning this was the only NBA draft where the Nets would participate in said draft under the New York Nets name. The draft consisted of 8 rounds comprising the selection of 170 players.

== Draft selections and draftee career notes ==
Kent Benson from Indiana University was selected first overall by the Milwaukee Bucks. Walter Davis from the University of North Carolina, who went on to win the Rookie of the Year Award in his first season, was selected fifth by the Phoenix Suns. Davis was also selected to both the All-NBA Team and the All-Star Game in his first season. He collected a total of six All-NBA Team selections and two All-Star Game selections. Three other players from this draft, second pick Otis Birdsong, third pick Marques Johnson and seventh pick Bernard King, were also selected to both the All-NBA Team and the All-Star Game. Birdsong was selected to four All-NBA Teams and one All-Star Game; Johnson was selected to five All-NBA Teams and three All-Star Games; and King was selected to four All-NBA Teams and four All-Star Games. Jack Sikma, the eighth pick, won the NBA championship with the Seattle SuperSonics in 1979 and was selected to seven consecutive All-Star Games. Rickey Green, the 16th pick, Norm Nixon, the 22nd pick, and Eddie Johnson, the 49th pick, are the only other players from this draft who were selected to an All-Star Game. Two players drafted went on to have coaching careers in the NBA: 33rd pick Eddie Jordan and 53rd pick John Kuester. Jordan has coached three teams in nine seasons, including five seasons with the Washington Wizards.

In the seventh round, the New Orleans Jazz selected Lusia Harris, a female college basketball star from Delta State University, with the 137th pick. She became the second woman ever drafted by an NBA team, after Denise Long, who was selected by the San Francisco Warriors in the 1969 draft. However, the league voided the Warriors' selection, thus Harris became the first and only woman to ever be officially drafted. Harris did not express an interest to play in the NBA and declined to try out for the Jazz. It was later revealed that she was pregnant at the time, which made her unable to attend the Jazz's training camp, even if she had wanted to. She never played in the NBA but she later played briefly in the Women's Professional Basketball League. In 1992, she was inducted to the Basketball Hall of Fame and became the first woman ever inducted to the Hall of Fame. She was also part of the inaugural class of inductees of the Women's Basketball Hall of Fame in 1999.

Also in the seventh round, the Kansas City Kings selected track and field athlete Bruce Jenner, now Caitlyn Jenner, with the 139th pick (needling the cross-town Kansas City Chiefs, who would often claim to select the "best athlete available" in the NFL draft). Jenner had just won the gold medal for decathlon at the 1976 Olympic Games, but had not actually played basketball since high school. Jenner was presented with a Kings jersey bearing the number 8618 (her Olympics decathlon score), but she never appeared in a game. (The closest Jenner would come to a basketball career was a few years later in the film Can't Stop the Music, in a sequence where she shot hoops with her co-stars The Village People). Jenner would later make headlines in 2015 for coming out as a trans woman, which retroactively made her the first transgender person to be drafted (though not play) in one of the Big Four leagues in the United States of America.

== Key ==
| Pos. | G | F | C |
| Position | Guard | Forward | Center |

| ^ | Denotes player who has been inducted to the Naismith Memorial Basketball Hall of Fame |
| * | Denotes player who has been selected for at least one All-Star Game and All-NBA Team |
| ^{+} | Denotes player who has been selected for at least one All-Star Game |
| ^{#} | Denotes player who has never appeared in an NBA regular-season or playoff game |
| ^{~} | Denotes player who has been selected as Rookie of the Year |

== Draft ==
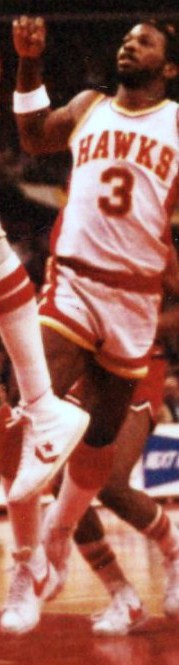
Eddie Johnson was the 49th pick by the Atlanta Hawks.

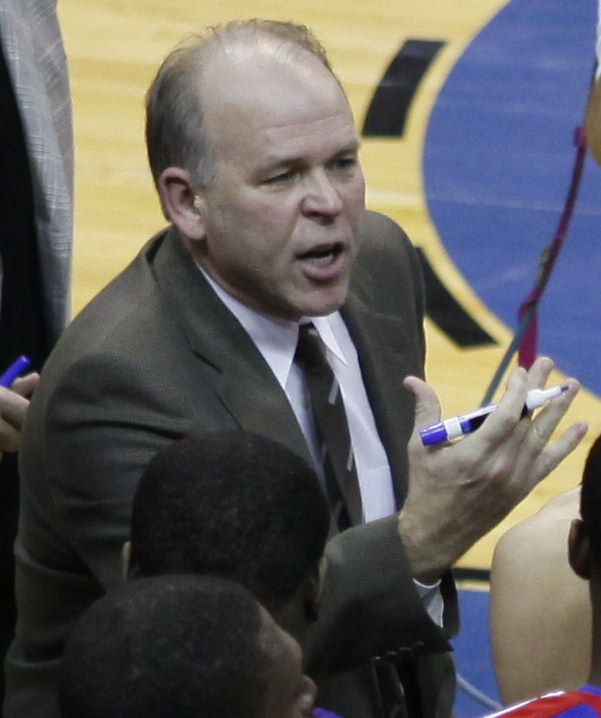
John Kuester was the 53rd pick by the Kansas City Kings.

| Round | Pick | Player | Pos. | Nationality | Team | School/club team |
|---|---|---|---|---|---|---|
| 1 | 1 | Kent Benson | C | United States | Milwaukee Bucks | Indiana (Sr.) |
| 1 | 2 | Otis Birdsong* | G | United States | Kansas City Kings (from N.Y. Nets)^{[a]} | Houston (Sr.) |
| 1 | 3 | Marques Johnson* | G/F | United States | Milwaukee Bucks (from Buffalo)^{[b]} | UCLA (Sr.) |
| 1 | 4 | Greg Ballard | F | United States | Washington Bullets (from Atlanta)^{[c]} | Oregon (Sr.) |
| 1 | 5 | Walter Davis^^{~} | G/F | United States | Phoenix Suns | North Carolina (Sr.) |
| 1 | 6 | Kenny Carr | F | United States | Los Angeles Lakers (from New Orleans)^{[d]} | NC State (Jr.) |
| 1 | 7 | Bernard King^ | F | United States | New York Nets (from Indiana)^{[e]} | Tennessee (Jr.) |
| 1 | 8 | Jack Sikma^ | F/C | United States | Seattle SuperSonics | Illinois Wesleyan (Sr.) |
| 1 | 9 | Tom LaGarde | F/C | United States | Denver Nuggets (from Kansas City)^{[f]} | North Carolina (Sr.) |
| 1 | 10 | Ray Williams | G | United States | New York Knicks | Minnesota (Sr.) |
| 1 | 11 | Ernie Grunfeld | G/F | United States | Milwaukee Bucks (from Cleveland)^{[g]} | Tennessee (Sr.) |
| 1 | 12 | Cedric Maxwell | F | United States | Boston Celtics | UNC Charlotte (Sr.) |
| 1 | 13 | Tate Armstrong | G | United States | Chicago Bulls^{[b]} | Duke (Sr.) |
| 1 | 14 | Tree Rollins | C | United States | Atlanta Hawks (from Detroit via Washington)^{[c]} | Clemson (Sr.) |
| 1 | 15 | Brad Davis | G | United States | Los Angeles Lakers (from San Antonio)^{[h]} | Maryland (Jr.) |
| 1 | 16 | Rickey Green^{+} | G | United States | Golden State Warriors | Michigan (Sr.) |
| 1 | 17 | Bo Ellis | F | United States | Washington Bullets | Marquette (Sr.) |
| 1 | 18 | Wesley Cox | F | United States | Golden State Warriors (from Houston via Buffalo)^{[i]} | Louisville (Sr.) |
| 1 | 19 | Rich Laurel | G | United States | Portland Trail Blazers | Hofstra (Sr.) |
| 1 | 20 | Glenn Mosley | F | United States | Philadelphia 76ers | Seton Hall (Sr.) |
| 1 | 21 | Anthony Roberts | G/F | United States | Denver Nuggets | Oral Roberts (Sr.) |
| 1 | 22 | Norm Nixon^{+} | G | United States | Los Angeles Lakers | Duquesne (Sr.) |
| 2 | 23 | Mike Glenn | G | United States | Chicago Bulls (from N.Y. Nets)^{[j]} | Southern Illinois (Sr.) |
| 2 | 24 | Larry Johnson | G | United States | Buffalo Braves^{[b]} | Kentucky (Sr.) |
| 2 | 25 | Wilson Washington | F/C | United States | Philadelphia 76ers (from Milwaukee)^{[k]} | Old Dominion (Sr.) |
| 2 | 26 | Glen Gondrezick | G/F | United States | New York Knicks (from Atlanta)^{[l]} | UNLV (Sr.) |
| 2 | 27 | Glen Williams^{#} | G | United States | Milwaukee Bucks (from Phoenix via Buffalo)^{[m]} | St. John's (Sr.) |
| 2 | 28 | Kim Anderson | F | United States | Portland Trail Blazers (from New Orleans)^{[n]} | Missouri (Sr.) |
| 2 | 29 | Alonzo Bradley | F | United States | Indiana Pacers | Texas Southern (Sr.) |
| 2 | 30 | Steve Sheppard | F | United States | Chicago Bulls (from Seattle via Denver and Kansas City)^{[f]} | Maryland (Sr.) |
| 2 | 31 | Eddie Owens | F | United States | Kansas City Kings | UNLV (Sr.) |
| 2 | 32 | Toby Knight | F | United States | New York Knicks | Notre Dame (Sr.) |
| 2 | 33 | Eddie Jordan | G | United States | Cleveland Cavaliers | Rutgers (Sr.) |
| 2 | 34 | Larry Moffett | F | United States | Houston Rockets (from Boston)^{[o]} | UNLV (Jr.) |
| 2 | 35 | Mark Landsberger | F/C | United States | Chicago Bulls | Arizona State (Sr.) |
| 2 | 36 | Ben Poquette | F/C | United States | Detroit Pistons | Central Michigan (Sr.) |
| 2 | 37 | Jeff Wilkins | F/C | United States | San Antonio Spurs | Illinois State (Sr.) |
| 2 | 38 | Ricky Love^{#} | F | United States | Golden State Warriors | Alabama-Huntsville (Sr.) |
| 2 | 39 | Phil Walker | G | United States | Washington Bullets | Millersville (Sr.) |
| 2 | 40 | Robert Reid | G/F | United States | Houston Rockets | St. Mary's (Texas) (Sr.) |
| 2 | 41 | T. R. Dunn | G/F | United States | Portland Trail Blazers | Alabama (Sr.) |
| 2 | 42 | Bob Elliott | F/C | United States | Philadelphia 76ers | Arizona (Sr.) |
| 2 | 43 | Herman Harris^{#} | F | United States | Philadelphia 76ers (from Denver)^{[p]} | Arizona (Sr.) |
| 2 | 44 | Essie Hollis | F | United States | New Orleans (from Los Angeles)^{[d]} | St. Bonaventure (Sr.) |
| 3 | 45 | Bill Paterno^{#} | F | United States | Kansas City Kings | Notre Dame (Sr.) |
| 3 | 46 | James Edwards | F/C | United States | Los Angeles Lakers (from Buffalo)^{[q]} | Washington (Sr.) |
| 3 | 47 | Gary Yoder^{#} | G | United States | Milwaukee Bucks | Cincinnati (Sr.) |
| 3 | 48 | Sam Smith | G | United States | Atlanta Hawks | UNLV (Sr.) |
| 3 | 49 | Eddie Johnson^{+} | G | United States | Atlanta Hawks (from Phoenix)^{[r]} | Auburn (Sr.) |
| 3 | 50 | Tony Hanson^{#} | G | United States | New Orleans Jazz | UConn (Sr.) |
| 3 | 51 | Stan Mayhew^{#} | F | United States | Indiana Pacers | Weber State (Sr.) |
| 3 | 52 | Joe Hassett | G | United States | Seattle SuperSonics | Providence (Sr.) |
| 3 | 53 | John Kuester | G | United States | Kansas City Kings | North Carolina (Sr.) |
| 3 | 54 | Lloyd McMillian^{#} | F | United States | New York Knicks | Long Beach State (Sr.) |
| 3 | 55 | Steve Grote^{#} | G | United States | Cleveland Cavaliers | Michigan (Sr.) |
| 3 | 56 | Skip Brown^{#} | G | United States | Boston Celtics | Wake Forest (Sr.) |
| 3 | 57 | Steve Puidokas^{#} | C | United States | Washington Bullets | Washington State (Sr.) |
| 3 | 58 | John Irving^{#} | F | United States | Detroit Pistons | Hofstra (Sr.) |
| 3 | 59 | Dan Henderson^{#} | F | United States | San Antonio Spurs | Arkansas State (Sr.) |
| 3 | 60 | Marlon Redmond | G | United States | Golden State Warriors | San Francisco (Sr.) |
| 3 | 61 | Jerry Schellenberg^{#} | F | United States | Washington Bullets | Wake Forest (Sr.) |
| 3 | 62 | Phil Bond | G | United States | Houston Rockets | Louisville (Sr.) |
| 3 | 63 | Ricky Brown^{#} | C | United States | Portland Trail Blazers | Alabama (Sr.) |
| 3 | 64 | Arnold Dugger^{#} | G | United States | Philadelphia 76ers | Oral Roberts (Sr.) |
| 3 | 65 | Robert Smith | G | United States | Denver Nuggets | UNLV (Sr.) |
| 3 | 66 | Mike Bratz | G | United States | Phoenix Suns (from Los Angeles)^{[s]} | Stanford (Sr.) |
| 4 | 67 | Robert Elmore^{#} | C | United States | New York Nets | Wichita State (Sr.) |
| 4 | 68 | Melvin Watkins^{#} | G | United States | Buffalo Braves | Charlotte (Sr.) |
| 4 | 69 | Lewis Brown | C | United States | Milwaukee Bucks | UNLV (Sr.) |
| 4 | 70 | Dave Bormann^{#} | F | United States | Atlanta Hawks | Gardner–Webb (Sr.) |
| 4 | 71 | Greg Griffin | F | United States | Phoenix Suns | Idaho State (Sr.) |
| 4 | 72 | Dennis Boyd | G | United States | New Orleans Jazz | Detroit (Sr.) |
| 4 | 73 | George Pendleton^{#} | G | United States | Indiana Pacers | Georgia State (Sr.) |
| 4 | 74 | Jim Cooper^{#} | F | United States | Seattle SuperSonics | Alabama State (Sr.) |
| 4 | 75 | Larry Williams^{#} | G | United States | Kansas City Kings | Texas Southern (Sr.) |
| 4 | 76 | Steve Hayes | C | United States | New York Knicks | Idaho State (Sr.) |
| 4 | 77 | Melvin Jones^{#} | G | United States | Cleveland Cavaliers | West Texas State (Sr.) |
| 4 | 78 | Jeff Cummings^{#} | C | United States | Boston Celtics | Tulane (Sr.) |
| 4 | 79 | Mike McConalthy^{#} | G | United States | Chicago Bulls | Louisiana Tech (Sr.) |
| 4 | 80 | Bruce King^{#} | C | United States | Detroit Pistons | Iowa (Sr.) |
| 4 | 81 | Matt Hicks^{#} | G | United States | San Antonio Spurs | Northern Illinois (Sr.) |
| 4 | 82 | Roy Smith^{#} | F | United States | Golden State Warriors | Kentucky State (Sr.) |
| 4 | 83 | David Reavis^{#} | F | United States | Washington Bullets | Georgia (Sr.) |
| 4 | 84 | Rocky Smith^{#} | G | United States | Houston Rockets | Oregon State (Sr.) |
| 4 | 85 | Greg White^{#} | F | United States | Portland Trail Blazers | USC (Sr.) |
| 4 | 86 | Jeff Jonas^{#} | G | United States | Philadelphia 76ers | Utah (Sr.) |
| 4 | 87 | Leartha Scott^{#} | G | United States | Golden State Warriors | Wisconsin–Parkside (Sr.) |
| 4 | 88 | Tony Robertson | G | United States | Los Angeles Lakers | West Virginia (Sr.) |
| 5 | 89 | Gerald Cunningham^{#} | F | United States | New York Nets | Kentucky State (Sr.) |
| 5 | 90 | Mike Hanley^{#} | F | United States | Buffalo Braves | Niagara (Sr.) |
| 5 | 91 | Ron Norwood^{#} | G | United States | Philadelphia 76ers | DePaul (Sr.) |
| 5 | 92 | Bill Gordon^{#} | G | United States | Atlanta Hawks | Chattanooga (Sr.) |
| 5 | 93 | Cecil Rellford^{#} | F | United States | Phoenix Suns | St. John's (Sr.) |
| 5 | 94 | Jim Grady^{#} | F | United States | New Orleans Jazz | Gonzaga (Sr.) |
| 5 | 95 | Marvin Jackson^{#} | F | United States | Indiana Pacers | Prairie View A&M (Sr.) |
| 5 | 96 | Dale Haverman^{#} | F | United States | Seattle SuperSonics | McKendree (Sr.) |
| 5 | 97 | Bob Chapman^{#} | G | United States | Kansas City Kings | Michigan State (Sr.) |
| 5 | 98 | Bill Terry^{#} | G | United States | New York Knicks | Monmouth (Sr.) |
| 5 | 99 | Al Smith^{#} | G | United States | Cleveland Cavaliers | Jackson State (Sr.) |
| 5 | 100 | Bill Langloh^{#} | G | United States | Boston Celtics | Virginia (Sr.) |
| 5 | 101 | Nate Davis^{#} | G | United States | Chicago Bulls | South Carolina (Sr.) |
| 5 | 102 | Jim Kennedy^{#} | F | United States | Detroit Pistons | Missouri (Sr.) |
| 5 | 103 | Scott Sims | G | United States | San Antonio Spurs | Missouri (Sr.) |
| 5 | 104 | Ray Epps | F | United States | Golden State Warriors | Norfolk State (Jr.) |
| 5 | 105 | Bruce Parkinson^{#} | G | United States | Washington Bullets | Purdue (Sr.) |
| 5 | 106 | Ed Thompson^{#} | G | United States | Houston Rockets | Idaho State (Sr.) |
| 5 | 107 | Donn Wilber^{#} | C | United States | Portland Trail Blazers | La Salle (Sr.) |
| 5 | 108 | Teko Wynder^{#} | G | United States | Philadelphia 76ers | Tulsa (Sr.) |
| 5 | 109 | John Billips^{#} | G | United States | Denver Nuggets | Ole Miss (Sr.) |
| 5 | 110 | John Robinson^{#} | F | United States | Los Angeles Lakers | Michigan (Sr.) |
| 6 | 111 | Mark Crow | F | United States | New York Nets | Duke (Sr.) |
| 6 | 112 | Curvan Lewis^{#} | F | United States | Buffalo Braves | Virginia Union (Sr.) |
| 6 | 113 | Chuck Goodyear^{#} | F | United States | Milwaukee Bucks | Miami (Sr.) |
| 6 | 114 | Calvin Crews^{#} | F | United States | Atlanta Hawks | Southwestern Louisiana (Sr.) |
| 6 | 115 | Billy McKinney | G | United States | Phoenix Suns | Northwestern (Sr.) |
| 6 | 116 | Wayne Golden^{#} | G | United States | New Orleans Jazz | Chattanooga (Sr.) |
| 6 | 117 | Tom Scheffler | C | United States | Indiana Pacers | Purdue (Sr.) |
| 6 | 118 | Bucky O'Brien^{#} | G | United States | Seattle SuperSonics | Seattle (Sr.) |
| 6 | 119 | Bob Cooper^{#} | F | United States | Kansas City Kings | Providence (Sr.) |
| 6 | 120 | Jerry Craycraft^{#} | G | United States | New York Knicks | Milligan (Sr.) |
| 6 | 121 | Ron Cox^{#} | F | United States | Cleveland Cavaliers | Eastern Washington (Sr.) |
| 6 | 122 | Roy Pace^{#} | G | United States | Boston Celtics | Rutgers–Camden (Sr.) |
| 6 | 123 | Jay Cheesman^{#} | F | United States | Chicago Bulls | BYU (Sr.) |
| 6 | 124 | Herb Nobles^{#} | F | United States | Detroit Pistons | Kansas (Sr.) |
| 6 | 125 | Bruce Buckley^{#} | F | United States | San Antonio Spurs | North Carolina (Sr.) |
| 6 | 126 | Jack Phelan^{#} | G | United States | Golden State Warriors | Saint Francis University (Sr.) |
| 6 | 127 | Ernie Wansley^{#} | C | United States | Washington Bullets | Virginia Tech (Sr.) |
| 6 | 128 | Myron Jordan^{#} | F | United States | Portland Trail Blazers | Pacific (Sr.) |
| 6 | 129 | George Gibson^{#} | G | United States | Philadelphia 76ers | Winston-Salem State (Sr.) |
| 6 | 130 | Jim Town^{#} | F | United States | Denver Nuggets | UMass (Sr.) |
| 6 | 131 | Grover Woolard^{#} | F | United States | Los Angeles Lakers | Murray State (Sr.) |
| 7 | 132 | Scott Conant^{#} | C | United States | New York Nets | Newberry (Sr.) |
| 7 | 133 | Mike Jackson^{#} | G | United States | Buffalo Braves | Tennessee (Sr.) |
| 7 | 134 | Ron Bostick^{#} | F | United States | Milwaukee Bucks | Detroit (Sr.) |
| 7 | 135 | James Holliman^{#} | G | United States | Atlanta Hawks | Arizona State (Sr.) |
| 7 | 136 | Alvin Scott | G/F | United States | Phoenix Suns | Oral Roberts (Sr.) |
| 7 | 137 | Lusia Harris^{#} | C | United States | New Orleans Jazz | Delta State (Sr.) |
| 7 | 138 | Billy Reynolds^{#} | F | United States | Seattle SuperSonics | Northwestern State (Sr.) |
| 7 | 139 | Bruce Jenner^{#} | G | United States | Kansas City Kings | Graceland (Sr.) |
| 7 | 140 | Tom Weadock^{#} | C | United States | New York Knicks | St. John's (Sr.) |
| 7 | 141 | Bob Riddle^{#} | F | United States | Cleveland Cavaliers | Eastern Michigan (Sr.) |
| 7 | 142 | Dave Kyle^{#} | F | United States | Boston Celtics | Cleveland State (Jr.) |
| 7 | 143 | Mike Smith^{#} | F | United States | Chicago Bulls | Evansville (Sr.) |
| 7 | 144 | Robert Lewis^{#} | F | United States | Detroit Pistons | Johnson C. Smith (Sr.) |
| 7 | 145 | Richard Robinson^{#} | G | United States | San Antonio Spurs | New Mexico State (Sr.) |
| 7 | 146 | Jerry Thruston^{#} | F | United States | Golden State Warriors | Mercer (Sr.) |
| 7 | 147 | Calvin Brown^{#} | G | United States | Washington Bullets | American (Sr.) |
| 7 | 148 | Don Smith^{#} | F | United States | Portland Trail Blazers | Oregon State (Sr.) |
| 7 | 149 | Dennis Forrest^{#} | G | United States | Philadelphia 76ers | Omaha (Sr.) |
| 7 | 150 | Willie High^{#} | G | United States | Denver Nuggets | Alabama State (Sr.) |
| 7 | 151 | Lars Hansen | C | Canada | Los Angeles Lakers | Cinzano Milano (Italy) |
| 8 | 152 | Ralph Drollinger | C | United States | New York Nets | Athletes in Action |
| 8 | 153 | Emery Sammons^{#} | G | United States | Buffalo Braves | Philadelphia Textile (Sr.) |
| 8 | 154 | Larry Pikes^{#} | G | United States | Milwaukee Bucks | Milwaukee (Sr.) |
| 8 | 155 | Verne Thompson^{#} | F | United States | Atlanta Hawks | BYU (Sr.) |
| 8 | 156 | Alvin Joseph^{#} | F | United States | Phoenix Suns | UC Riverside (Sr.) |
| 8 | 157 | Dave Speicher^{#} | F | United States | New Orleans Jazz | Toledo (Sr.) |
| 8 | 158 | Jeff Frey^{#} | F | United States | Seattle SuperSonics | Evansville (Sr.) |
| 8 | 159 | Ken Slappy^{#} | G | United States | New York Knicks | Saint Peter's (Sr.) |
| 8 | 160 | Tom Cutter^{#} | F | United States | Cleveland Cavaliers | Western Michigan (Sr.) |
| 8 | 161 | Tom Harris^{#} | G | United States | Boston Celtics | Bowling Green (Sr.) |
| 8 | 162 | Rich Rhodes^{#} | G | United States | Chicago Bulls | Eastern Illinois (Sr.) |
| 8 | 163 | Tim Appleton^{#} | F | United States | Detroit Pistons | Kenyon (Sr.) |
| 8 | 164 | Jerome Gladney^{#} | F | United States | San Antonio Spurs | Arizona (Sr.) |
| 8 | 165 | Ricky Marsh | G | United States | Golden State Warriors | Manhattan (Sr.) |
| 8 | 166 | Pat McKinley^{#} | F | United States | Washington Bullets | Towson (Sr.) |
| 8 | 167 | Harold Rhodes^{#} | G | United States | Portland Trail Blazers | Washington State (Sr.) |
| 8 | 168 | John Olive | F | United States | Philadelphia 76ers | Villanova (Sr.) |
| 8 | 169 | Len Sanders^{#} | G | United States | Denver Nuggets | Florida (Sr.) |
| 8 | 170 | Art Allen^{#} | G | United States | Buffalo Braves | Pepperdine (Sr.) |

== Trades ==
- ^{a} On September 10, 1976, the Kansas City Kings acquired Jim Eakins, Brian Taylor, 1977 and 1978 first-round picks from the New York Nets in exchange for Nate Archibald. The Kings used the pick to draft Otis Birdsong.
- ^{b 1} ^{2} ^{3} On the draft-day, the Chicago Bulls re-acquired their first-round pick from the Buffalo Braves, while the Braves re-acquired their second-round pick from the Bulls. Previously, the Braves acquired Swen Nater and the Bulls' pick on June 7, 1977, from the Milwaukee Bucks in exchange for the Braves' first-round pick. Previously, the Bucks acquired the Bulls' pick on November 2, 1976, from the Braves in exchange for Jim Price. Previously, the Braves acquired the Bulls' pick on November 27, 1975, from the Bulls in exchange for Jack Marin. Previously, the Bulls acquired Matt Guokas, the Braves' pick and a second-round pick on September 4, 1974, from the Braves in exchange for Bob Weiss. The Bucks used the Braves' first-round pick to draft Marques Johnson.
- ^{c 1} ^{2} On January 20, 1977, the Washington Bullets acquired Tom Henderson and a first-round pick from the Atlanta Hawks in exchange for Truck Robinson and a first-round pick. Previously, the Bullets acquired Dave Bing and the pick on August 28, 1975, from the Detroit Pistons in exchange for Kevin Porter. The Bullets used the pick to draft Greg Ballard. The Hawks used the pick to draft Tree Rollins.
- ^{d 1} ^{2} On August 5, 1976, the Los Angeles Lakers acquired 1977, 1978 and 1979 first-round picks, and a 1980 second-round pick from the New Orleans Jazz in exchange for a 1978 first-round pick and a 1977 second-round pick. This trade was arranged as compensation when the Jazz signed Gail Goodrich on July 19, 1976. The Lakers used the pick to draft Kenny Carr. The Jazz used the pick to draft Essie Hollis.
- ^{e} On February 1, 1977, the New York Nets acquired Darnell Hillman and a first-round pick from the Indiana Pacers in exchange for John Williamson. The Nets used the pick to draft Bernard King.
- ^{f 1} ^{2} On May 25, 1977, the Denver Nuggets acquired Brian Taylor and the ninth pick from the Kansas City Kings in exchange for Tommy Burleson and a second-round pick. Previously, the Nuggets acquired Tommy Burleson, Bob Wilkerson and the second-round pick from the Seattle SuperSonics on May 24, 1977, in exchange for Paul Silas, Marvin Webster and Willie Wise. Previously, the Chicago Bulls acquired the second-round pick and a 1976 third-round pick from the Kings on December 8, 1975, in exchange for Matt Guokas. The Nuggets used the pick to draft Tom LaGarde. The Bulls used the pick to draft Steve Sheppard.
- ^{g} On January 13, 1977, the Milwaukee Bucks acquired Rowland Garrett, 1977 and 1978 first-round picks from the Cleveland Cavaliers in exchange for Elmore Smith and Gary Brokaw. The Bucks used the pick to draft Ernie Grunfeld.
- ^{h} On November 16, 1976, the Los Angeles Lakers acquired a first-round pick from the San Antonio Spurs in exchange for Mack Calvin. The Lakers used the pick to draft Brad Davis.
- ^{i} On January 18, 1977, the Golden State Warriors acquired a first-round pick from the Buffalo Braves in exchange for George Johnson. Previously, the Braves acquired the pick and a 1978 first-round pick from the Houston Rockets on October 24, 1976, in exchange for Moses Malone. The Warriors used the pick to draft Wesley Cox.
- ^{j} On November 30, 1976, the Chicago Bulls acquired a second-round pick from the New York Nets in exchange for Bob Love. The Bulls used the pick to draft Mike Glenn.
- ^{k} On December 8, 1976, the Philadelphia 76ers acquired 1977 and 1978 second-round picks from the Milwaukee Bucks in exchange for Fred Carter. The 76ers used the pick to draft Wilson Washington.
- ^{l} On October 1, 1976, the New York Knicks acquired a second-round pick from the Atlanta Hawks in exchange for Randy Denton. The Knicks used the pick to draft Glen Gondrezick.
- ^{m} On August 5, 1976, the Milwaukee Bucks acquired a second-round pick from the Buffalo Braves in exchange for the seventh pick in the ABA dispersal draft. Previously, the Braves acquired the pick the Phoenix Suns on August 25, 1976, in exchange for Tom Van Arsdale. The Bucks used the pick to draft Glenn Williams.
- ^{n} On June 3, 1976, the Portland Trail Blazers acquired a 1977 second-round pick from the New Orleans Jazz in exchange for a 1976 second-round pick. The Blazers used the pick to draft Kim Anderson.
- ^{o} On June 9, 1977, the Houston Rockets acquired 1977 and 1978 second-round picks from the Boston Celtics in exchange for John Johnson. The Rockets used the pick to draft Larry Moffett.
- ^{p} On August 5, 1976, the Philadelphia 76ers acquired a second-round pick from the Denver Nuggets in exchange for Roland Taylor. The 76ers used the pick to draft Herm Harris.
- ^{q} On August 5, 1976, the Los Angeles Lakers acquired a third-round pick from the Buffalo Braves in exchange for Johnny Neumann. The Lakers used the pick to draft James Edwards.
- ^{r} On October 8, 1973, the Atlanta Hawks acquired a 1976 second-round pick and a 1977 third-round pick from the Phoenix Suns in exchange for Bob Christian. The Hawks used the pick to draft Eddie Johnson.
- ^{s} On November 27, 1974, the Phoenix Suns acquired a 1976 second-round pick and a 1977 third-round pick from the Los Angeles Lakers in exchange for Corky Calhoun. The Suns used the pick to draft Mike Bratz.

== Early entrants ==
=== College underclassmen ===
After seeing a major influx of underclassmen enter the draft the previous year, only thirteen total underclassmen would decide to enter this year's draft, with six of these players later revoking their entries to this draft altogether. The following college basketball players successfully applied for early draft entrance.

- (United States) Kenny Carr – F, NC State (junior)
- (United States) Brad Davis – G, Maryland (junior)
- (United States) Ray Epps – F, Norfolk State (junior)
- (United States) Bernard King – F, Tennessee (junior)
- (United States) Larry Moffett – F, UNLV (junior)
- (United States) James Redwine – G, Eastern Washington (freshman)
- (United States) Ray Tatum – F, Malone (junior)

== Notes ==
1: Ernie Grunfeld was born in Romania, but grew up in the United States and has represented the United States national team.
2: Lars Hansen was born in Denmark, but grew up in Canada and has represented the Canadian national team.
3: Jenner changed her name to Caitlyn Jenner due to gender transition in 2015.

== See also ==
- List of first overall NBA draft picks
