= Jim Boylan =

American basketball coach (born 1955)

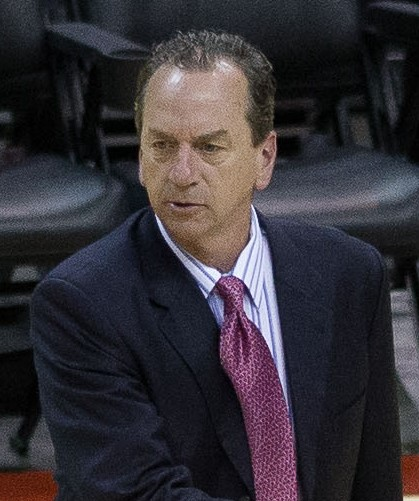
- Boylan as head coach of the Milwaukee Bucks in 2013

Personal information
- Born: April 28, 1955 (age 71) Jersey City, New Jersey, U.S.
- Listed height: 6 ft 2 in (1.88 m)
- Listed weight: 175 lb (79 kg)

Career information
- High school: St. Mary (Jersey City, New Jersey)
- College: Assumption (1974–1976); Marquette (1976–1978)
- NBA draft: 1978: 4th round, 68th overall pick
- Drafted by: San Diego Clippers
- Playing career: 1978–1986
- Position: Point guard
- Coaching career: 1982–2018

Career history

Playing
- 1978–1979: Tucson Gunners
- 1979–1980: Alviks BK
- 1982–1986: Vevey Basket

Coaching
- 1982–1986: Vevey Basket
- 1986–1989: Michigan State (assistant)
- 1989–1992: New Hampshire
- 1997–2001: Vancouver Grizzlies (assistant)
- 2001–2002: Phoenix Suns (assistant)
- 2003–2004: Atlanta Hawks (assistant)
- 2004–2007: Chicago Bulls (assistant)
- 2007–2008: Chicago Bulls (interim)
- 2008–2013: Milwaukee Bucks (assistant)
- 2013: Milwaukee Bucks (interim)
- 2013–2018: Cleveland Cavaliers (assistant)

Career highlights
- As player: NCAA champion (1977); As assistant coach: NBA champion (2016)
- Stats at Basketball Reference

Jim Boylan (born April 28, 1955) is an American former professional basketball coach. He served as the interim head coach for the Chicago Bulls for part of the 2007–08 NBA season. He also served as an interim coach for the Milwaukee Bucks for part of the 2012–13 NBA season. Most recently, he played a part in helping the Cleveland Cavaliers win the 2016 NBA Finals over the Golden State Warriors.

== Playing career ==
Born and raised in Jersey City, New Jersey, Boylan played basketball at St. Mary High School.

He started his college career at Assumption College in Worcester, Massachusetts then a strong NCAA Division II program before transferring to Marquette University in Milwaukee, Wisconsin. His older brother, Mike, had enjoyed an outstanding basketball career at Assumption. He was Division II Player of the Year as a senior and among the school's all-time scoring leaders. Jim started at point guard his first two years at Assumption, 1973–1977, leading the team to a third-place finish in the national championship tournament both seasons. Following his sophomore season he transferred to Marquette University in Division I. He played point guard at Marquette, where he helped the Warriors win the 1977 NCAA Men's Division I Basketball Tournament (Marquette's only championship) by scoring 14 points in the National Championship Game versus the North Carolina Tar Heels. After leading Marquette in assists in his junior and senior season, Boylan was drafted in the fourth round (68th overall) in the 1978 NBA draft by the Buffalo Braves, who became the San Diego Clippers after the 1977–78 season. Boylan played for the Tucson Gunners in the Western Basketball Association during the 1978–79 season. He was named a second team All Star, and he helped the Gunners with the WBA championship. However, Boylan never played an NBA game. He headed to Europe instead, having a short pro career. He played for Alviks BK of Stockholm, Sweden in the 1979–80 season.

== Coaching career ==
Boylan began his coaching career as a player-coach in Switzerland from 1982 to 1986 and led Vevey Basket to its first championship in its 30-year history. At age 31, he moved back to the States becoming an assistant under Jud Heathcote at Michigan State University from 1986 to 1989. Boylan then took over head coaching duties at the University of New Hampshire, succeeding Gerry Friel. UNH fired Boylan after three dismal seasons in the spring of 1992.

In 1992 Boylan entered the NBA as a video coordinator and advance scout for the Cleveland Cavaliers. In 1997, he moved over to the Vancouver Grizzlies, serving as an assistant under Brian Hill and later Lionel Hollins. In 2001, Boylan became a member of Frank Johnson's coaching staff in Phoenix, and remained working for the Phoenix Suns under Johnson's successor Scott Skiles. After Skiles was fired in 2002, Boylan worked with Terry Stotts for the Atlanta Hawks during the 2003–04 NBA season.

In 2004, Boylan became lead assistant to Skiles, who had taken over as head coach of the Chicago Bulls. On December 27, 2007, after the firing of Scott Skiles, Jim was named the interim coach for the Bulls for the remaining season. Boylan was not retained at the conclusion of the season after compiling a 24–32 record with the Bulls. On May 14, 2008, he was hired as an assistant to Scott Skiles by the Milwaukee Bucks. When Skiles resigned in January 2013, Boylan became head coach of the Bucks. The team went 22–28 under his guidance and made the playoffs, but were swept in the first round by the Miami Heat. At the end of the season, the Bucks decided not to give Boylan a new contract. Instead, Boylan would be hired by the Cleveland Cavaliers later on in the same year. He would later on be a part of the 2015–16 Cleveland Cavaliers squad to earn an NBA Finals championship over the 73–9 Golden State Warriors.

== Head coaching record ==
Legend
Regular season	G	Games coached	W	Games won	L	Games lost	W–L %	Win–loss %
Playoffs	PG	Playoff games	PW	Playoff wins	PL	Playoff losses	PW–L %	Playoff win–loss %

Team	Year	G	W	L	W–L%	Finish	PG	PW	PL	PW–L%	Result
Chicago	2007–08	56	24	32	.429	4th in Central	—	—	—	—	Missed Playoffs
Milwaukee	2012–13	50	22	28	.440	3rd in Central	4	0	4	.000	Lost in First Round
Career		106	46	60	.434		4	0	4	.000	
