= 2006 Horizon League men's basketball tournament =

- Classification: Division I
- Season: 2005–06
- Teams: 9
- First round site: campus sites
- Quarterfinals site: U.S. Cellular Arena; Milwaukee, Wisconsin
- Semifinals site: U.S. Cellular Arena; Milwaukee, Wisconsin
- Finals site: U.S. Cellular Arena; Milwaukee, Wisconsin
- Champions: Milwaukee (3rd title)
- Winning coach: Rob Jeter (1st title)
- MVP: Adrian Tigert (Milwaukee)

2005–06 Horizon League men's basketball standings
	Conf.				Overall
Team	W		L	PCT	W		L	PCT
Milwaukee †	12	–	4	.750	22	–	9	.710
Butler	11	–	5	.688	20	–	13	.606
Loyola (IL)	8	–	8	.500	19	–	11	.633
UIC	8	–	8	.500	16	–	15	.516
Detroit	8	–	8	.500	16	–	16	.500
Green Bay	8	–	8	.500	15	–	16	.484
Wright State	8	–	8	.500	13	–	15	.464
Cleveland State	5	–	11	.313	10	–	18	.357
Youngstown State	4	–	12	.250	7	–	21	.250
† 2006 Horizon League Tournament winner As of August 1, 2010; Rankings from AP Poll

The 2006 Horizon League men's basketball tournament took place at the end of the 2005–06 regular season. The better seed hosted each first round match. Milwaukee hosted the second round and semifinals, because they were the top seed overall, as well as the final because they were the highest remaining seed.

== Seeds ==
All Horizon League schools played in the tournament. Teams were seeded by 2005–06 Horizon League season record, with a tiebreaker system to seed teams with identical conference records. The top 2 teams received a bye to the semifinals and the third seed received a bye to the quarterfinals.

== Bracket ==
First Round; Tuesday, February 28
4	Loyola	76
9	Youngstown State	61
5	Detroit	92
8	Cleveland State	58
6	UIC	77
7	Wright State	67

Second Round; Friday, March 3
4	Loyola	64
5	Detroit	55
3	Green Bay	76
6	UIC	66

Semifinals; Saturday, March 4
1	Milwaukee	80
4	Loyola	66
2	Butler	73
3	Green Bay	51

Championship; Tuesday, March 7
1	Milwaukee	87
2	Butler	71

First round games at campus sites of higher seeds
Second round and semifinals hosted by the top seed. Championship hosted by best remaining seed
