= Ray Epps (basketball) =

American basketball player

Personal information
- Born: August 20, 1956 (age 70) Amelia, Virginia, U.S.
- Listed height: 6 ft 6 in (1.98 m)
- Listed weight: 195 lb (88 kg)

Career information
- High school: George Wythe (Richmond, Virginia)
- College: Norfolk State (1974–1977)
- NBA draft: 1977: 5th round, 104th overall pick
- Drafted by: Golden State Warriors
- Position: Small forward
- Number: 32

Career history
- 1978–1979: Golden State Warriors
- 1978–1979: Montana Sky
- Stats at NBA.com
- Stats at Basketball Reference

Raymond Edward Epps Jr. (born August 20, 1956) is an American former professional basketball player.

A 6 ft 6 in (1.98 m) forward born in Amelia, Virginia, and from Norfolk State University, Epps was selected by the Golden State Warriors in the fifth round of the 1977 NBA draft. He left college early to play for the Warriors as a "hardship case." In the 1977–78 NBA season, Epps did not play due to his injury. In the 1978–79 NBA season, he played 13 games for the Warriors and scored 26 points. In December 1978, Epps left early and was subbed with Raymond Townsend.

Afterward, Epps played for the Montana Sky of the Western Basketball Association in the league's first and only season. His tenure began in January 1979. Less than a month later, Epps was suspended indefinitely after shoving Rex Hughes, the team's coach.

== Career statistics ==
Legend
GP	Games played	GS	Games started	MPG	Minutes per game
FG%	Field goal percentage	3P%	3-point field goal percentage	FT%	Free throw percentage
RPG	Rebounds per game	APG	Assists per game	SPG	Steals per game
BPG	Blocks per game	PPG	Points per game	**Bold**	Career high

=== NBA ===
==== Regular season ====
Year	Team	GP	MPG	FG%	FT%	RPG	APG	SPG	BPG	PPG
1978–79	Golden State	13	5.5	.435	.750	.4	.2	.1	.0	2.0
