= Nicholas Stoodley =

American basketball club competed in the Philippines

- Company: Nicholas Stoodley
- Head coach: Jerry Weber
- Championships: Philippine Basketball Association (1); 1980 Invitational

Nicholas Stoodley was an American basketball team owned by fashion brand of the same name which played and won the 1980 PBA Invitational championship. Consisted of American players, it is the first guest team to won a Philippine Basketball Association (PBA) championship.

== History ==
In 1980, United States-based fashion brand Nicholas Stoodley formed a basketball team to take part at the 1980 Invitational championship of the Philippine Basketball Association (PBA). Nicknamed the Fashionmakers, the team consists of twelve American players who are either looking to get scouted in the NBA or earn a new stint as imports for a regular PBA franchise team. The team was coached by Jerry Weber.

They became the first-ever guest team to win a tournament in the PBA. They won 2–0 at the expense of the Toyota Tamaraws team in the best-of-three finals.

== Players ==
- Rick Hawthorne
- Ollie Matson
- Larry Moffett
- Larry Pounds
- Ron Richardson
- Larry Spicer
- Kenny Tyler

== Legacy ==
Nicholas Stoodley is the first-ever guest team to win a PBA championship. Nicholas Stoodley, the fashion brand, later sponsored the South Korean national team's guest participation in the 1982 Invitational championship. The national team playing as Northern Consolidated Cement is the first local guest team and second guest team overall to win a championship when it won the 1985 Reinforced Conference. As of the 2022–23 season, Nicholas Stoodley remains the only foreign guest team to win a conference.
