= Wesley Cox =

American basketball player (1955–2024)

Personal information
- Born: January 27, 1955 Louisville, Kentucky, U.S.
- Died: November 17, 2024 (aged 69) Louisville, Kentucky, U.S.
- Listed height: 6 ft 6 in (1.98 m)
- Listed weight: 215 lb (98 kg)

Career information
- High school: Male (Louisville, Kentucky)
- College: Louisville (1973–1977)
- NBA draft: 1977: 1st round, 18th overall pick
- Drafted by: Golden State Warriors
- Playing career: 1977–1979
- Position: Small forward
- Number: 41

Career history
- 1977–1979: Golden State Warriors

Career highlights
- First-team All-Metro Conference (1977); Second-team Parade All-American (1973); Kentucky Mr. Basketball (1973)
- Stats at NBA.com
- Stats at Basketball Reference

Wesley Cox (January 27, 1955 – November 17, 2024) was an American professional basketball player for the Golden State Warriors of the National Basketball Association (NBA). Wesley was selected by the Warriors in the first round of the 1977 NBA draft with the 18th overall pick. He played two seasons in the NBA, averaging 4.6 points per game and 2.8 rebounds per game.

As a high school player, Cox was named a second-team Parade All-American in 1973.

Cox died on November 17, 2024, at the age of 69.

== Career statistics ==
Legend
GP	Games played	GS	Games started	MPG	Minutes per game
FG%	Field goal percentage	3P%	3-point field goal percentage	FT%	Free throw percentage
RPG	Rebounds per game	APG	Assists per game	SPG	Steals per game
BPG	Blocks per game	PPG	Points per game	**Bold**	Career high

=== NBA ===
==== Regular season ====
Year	Team	GP	GS	MPG	FG%	FT%	RPG	APG	SPG	BPG	PPG
1977–78	Golden State	**43**		10.5	.399	**.580**	**3.3**	.3	**.5**	**.2**	4.6
1978–79	Golden State	31	**11.6**	**.431**	.435	2.0	**.4**	.4	**.2**	**4.7**	
Career		74	11.0	.412	.510	2.8	.3	.5	.2	4.6	
