= 2005–06 Cleveland State Vikings men's basketball team =

American college basketball season

2005–06 Cleveland State Vikings men's basketball
- Conference: Horizon League
- Record: 10–18 (5–11 Horizon League)
- Head coach: Mike Garland
- Home arena: Wolstein Center

2005–06 Horizon League men's basketball standings
	Conf.				Overall
Team	W		L	PCT	W		L	PCT
Milwaukee †	12	–	4	.750	22	–	9	.710
Butler	11	–	5	.688	20	–	13	.606
Loyola (IL)	8	–	8	.500	19	–	11	.633
UIC	8	–	8	.500	16	–	15	.516
Detroit	8	–	8	.500	16	–	16	.500
Green Bay	8	–	8	.500	15	–	16	.484
Wright State	8	–	8	.500	13	–	15	.464
Cleveland State	5	–	11	.313	10	–	18	.357
Youngstown State	4	–	12	.250	7	–	21	.250
† 2006 Horizon League Tournament winner As of August 1, 2010; Rankings from AP Poll

The 2005–06 Cleveland State Vikings men's basketball team represented Cleveland State University in the 2005–06 college basketball season. The team was led by third-year head coach Mike Garland. In 2004–05, the Vikings finished 9–17 (6–10 in the Horizon League). Cleveland State played for the first time since late in the 1990–91 season in Woodling Gym, which served as the home of Viking men's basketball from the 1972–73 season until the Wolstein Center opened prior to the 1991–92 season. The win against Rochester College raised CSU's all-time record in the building to 123–21. It was the 75th season of Cleveland State basketball.

== Notable players ==
- Carlos English

== Preseason ==
The preseason Horizon League Coaches' Poll picked the Vikings to finish eighth. Raheem Moss was named to the preseason all-Horizon League 2nd team.

== Schedule ==
Horizon League Standing: 8th
Date	Opponent*	Rank*	Location	Time^{#}	Result	Overall	Conference
**Regular Season Games**
November 19, 2005	Florida A&M		Cleveland, OH	5:30 p.m.	L 68–66	0–1	0–0
November 22, 2005	North Carolina		Chapel Hill, NC	9:00 p.m.	L 112–55	0–2	0–0
November 26, 2005	Rochester College		Cleveland, OH	3:00 p.m.	W 76–43	1–2	0–0
November 30, 2005	Central Michigan		Cleveland, OH	7:00 p.m.	W 56–43	2–2	0–0
December 3, 2005	Kent State		Kent, OH	7:00 p.m.	L 83–68	2–3	0–0
December 10, 2005	Albany		Cleveland, OH	5:30 p.m.	L 78–65	2–4	0–0
December 16, 2005	Michigan State		East Lansing, MI	7:00 p.m.	L 83–75	2–5	0–0
December 20, 2005	Utah Valley State College		Cleveland, OH	7:00 p.m.	W 70–69	3–5	0–0
December 22, 2005	John Carroll		Cleveland, OH	7:30 p.m.	W 84–53	4–5	0–0
December 29, 2005	**Loyola Chicago**		Cleveland, OH	7:00 p.m.	L 77–60	4–6	0–1
January 2, 2006	**UW–Milwaukee**		Milwaukee, WI	8:00 p.m.	L 75–68	4–7	0–2
January 5, 2006	**Wright State**		Cleveland, OH	7:00 p.m.	L 58–55	4–8	0–3
January 12, 2006	**Detroit Mercy**		Cleveland, OH	7:30 p.m.	W 59–53	5–8	1–3
January 14, 2006	**Youngstown State**		Youngstown, OH	7:35 p.m.	W 63–50	6–8	2–3
January 16, 2006	Akron		Cleveland, OH	7:00 p.m.	L 62–50	6–9	2–3
January 19, 2006	**Illinois Chicago**		Chicago, IL	8:00 p.m.	W 87–83	7–9	3–3
January 21, 2006	**UW–Green Bay**		Green Bay, WI	8:05 p.m.	W 66–63	8–9	4–3
January 25, 2006	**Butler**		Cleveland, OH	7:00 p.m.	L 55–51	8–10	4–4
January 28, 2006	**Youngstown State**		Cleveland, OH	5:30 p.m.	L 68–63	8–11	4–5
February 2, 2006	**Detroit Mercy**		Detroit, MI	7:05 p.m.	L 84–73	8–12	4–6
February 4, 2006	**Loyola Chicago**		Chicago, IL	5:00 p.m.	L 81–75	8–13	4–7
February 8, 2006	**Butler**		Indianapolis, IN	7:00 p.m.	L 78–49	8–14	4–8
February 11, 2006	**UW–Milwaukee**		Chicago, IL	5:30 p.m.	L 86–57	8–15	4–9
February 15, 2006	**Wright State**		Fairborn, OH	8:05 p.m.	W 63–56	9–15	5–9
February 18, 2006	Delaware		Cleveland, OH	5:30 p.m.	W 52–40	10–15	5–9
February 22, 2006	**Illinois Chicago**		Cleveland, OH	8:05 p.m.	L 72–67	10–16	5–10
February 25, 2006	**UW–Green Bay**		Cleveland, OH	5:30 p.m.	L 76–72	10–17	5–11
**Horizon League tournament**
February 28, 2006	**Detroit Mercy**		Detroit, MI	7:00 p.m.	L 92–58	10–18	5–11
*Rank according to ESPN/USA Today Coaches Poll. ^{#}All times are in EST. Conference games in **BOLD**.
