= 2005–06 Butler Bulldogs men's basketball team =

American college basketball season

2005–06 Butler Bulldogs men's basketball
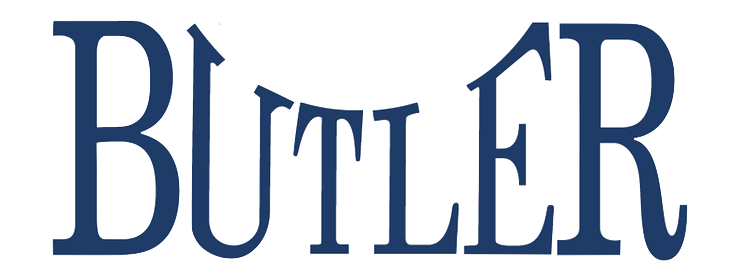

NIT 8 Seed (Cincinnati)

First Round vs. Florida St., L 67–63
- Conference: Horizon League
- Record: 20–13 (11–5 Horizon)
- Head coach: Todd Lickliter (5th season)
- Assistant coaches: Matthew Graves; LaVall Jordan; Brad Stevens
- MVP: Brandon Polk
- Captains: Bruce Horan; Brandon Crone; Brian Ligon
- Home arena: Hinkle Fieldhouse

2005–06 Horizon League men's basketball standings
	Conf.				Overall
Team	W		L	PCT	W		L	PCT
Milwaukee †	12	–	4	.750	22	–	9	.710
Butler	11	–	5	.688	20	–	13	.606
Loyola (IL)	8	–	8	.500	19	–	11	.633
UIC	8	–	8	.500	16	–	15	.516
Detroit	8	–	8	.500	16	–	16	.500
Green Bay	8	–	8	.500	15	–	16	.484
Wright State	8	–	8	.500	13	–	15	.464
Cleveland State	5	–	11	.313	10	–	18	.357
Youngstown State	4	–	12	.250	7	–	21	.250
† 2006 Horizon League Tournament winner As of August 1, 2010; Rankings from AP Poll

The 2005–06 Butler Bulldogs men's basketball team represented Butler University in the 2005–06 NCAA Division I men's basketball season. Their head coach was Todd Lickliter, serving his 5th year. The Bulldogs played their home games at Hinkle Fieldhouse.

The Bulldogs earned an at-large bid to the 2006 National Invitation Tournament, earning an 8 seed in the Cincinnati bracket. They beat 7 seed Miami (OH) 53–42 in the opening round before falling to 2 seed Florida State 67–63 in the first round.

== Roster ==
2005–06 Butler Bulldogs men's basketball team
Players
Coaches

Pos.	#	Name	Height	Weight	Year	Hometown
G/F	1	Julian Betko	6 ft 5 in (1.96 m)	200 lb (91 kg)	So	Ružomberok, Slovakia
F	34	Pete Campbell	6 ft 7 in (2.01 m)	200 lb (91 kg)	So	Muncie, IN
F	33	Brandon Crone (C)	6 ft 6 in (1.98 m)	225 lb (102 kg)	Jr	Frankfort, IN
G	4	A. J. Graves	6 ft 1 in (1.85 m)	155 lb (70 kg)	So	Switz City, IN
G	10	Mike Green	6 ft 1 in (1.85 m)	175 lb (79 kg)	Jr	Philadelphia, PA
G	3	Bruce Horan (C)	6 ft 3 in (1.91 m)	190 lb (86 kg)	Sr	New Castle, IN
F	24	Brian Ligon (C)	6 ft 7 in (2.01 m)	240 lb (109 kg)	Jr	St. Petersburg, FL
G	23	Marcus Nellems	6 ft 4 in (1.93 m)	200 lb (91 kg)	Jr	Fort Wayne, IN
F	20	Brandon Polk	6 ft 6 in (1.98 m)	210 lb (95 kg)	Sr	Wichita, KS
G	21	Avery Sheets	6 ft 0 in (1.83 m)	170 lb (77 kg)	Sr	Lafayette, IN
G	5	Ben Slaton (W)	6 ft 1 in (1.85 m)	160 lb (73 kg)	Fr	Columbus, IN
G/F	32	Drew Streicher	6 ft 7 in (2.01 m)	200 lb (91 kg)	So	Washington, IN

Head coach

- Todd Lickliter (Butler)

Assistant coach(es)

- Matthew Graves (Butler)
- LaVall Jordan (Butler)
- Brad Stevens (DePauw)

Legend

- (C) Team captain
- (S) Suspended
- (I) Ineligible
- (W) Walk-on
- Injured
- Current redshirt

Roster
Last update: 21 July 2021

== Schedule ==
Date time, TV	Rank^{#}	Opponent^{#}	Result	Record	Site city, state
Non-conference regular season
Nov 13, 2005*; 2:00		vs. UNC-Wilmington; BCA Invitational	L 59-75	0-1	Arena-Auditorium (5,744); Laramie, WY
Nov 14, 2005*; 2:00		vs. Alabama State; BCA Invitational	W 70-61	1-1	Arena-Auditorium (4,540); Laramie, WY
Nov 15, 2005*; 4:00		vs. Lehigh; BCA Invitational	W 66-41	2-1	Arena-Auditorium (1,254); Laramie, WY
Nov 22, 2005*; ESPN3		at Ohio State	L 69-79	2-2	Value City Arena (12,915); Columbus, OH
Nov 26, 2005*; 2:00		at Michigan	L 74-78	2-3	Crisler Arena (9,513); Ann Arbor, MI
Nov 30, 2005*; 7:00		Tulane	W 82-61	3-3	Hinkle Fieldhouse (2,451); Indianapolis, IN
Dec 3, 2005*; 7:00		at Ball State	W 64-53	4-3	John E. Worthen Arena (6,509); Muncie, IN
Dec 6, 2005*; 7:00		Bradley	W 70-60	5-3	Hinkle Fieldhouse (2,694); Indianapolis, IN
Dec 17, 2005*; 8:00		Indiana State	L 58-59	5-4	Hinkle Fieldhouse (4,322); Indianapolis, IN
Dec 19, 2005*; 7:30		Elon	W 86-40	6-4	Hinkle Fieldhouse (2,251); Indianapolis, IN
Dec 23, 2005*; 6:00		vs. No. 18 Indiana	L 55-73	6-5	Conseco Fieldhouse (13,152); Indianapolis, IN
Dec 28, 2005*; 8:00		at South Dakota State	W 85-48	7-5	Frost Arena (1,968); Brookings, SD
Horizon League Play
Jan 2, 2006; 2:00		UIC	W 75-56	8-5 (1-0)	Hinkle Fieldhouse (2,833); Indianapolis, IN
Jan 7, 2006; 8:00		at Milwaukee	L 59-64	8-6 (1-1)	U.S. Cellular Arena (5,512); Milwaukee, WI
Jan 14, 2006; 2:00		Detroit	W 64-52	9-6 (2-1)	Hinkle Fieldhouse (3,256); Indianapolis, IN
Jan 19, 2006; 8:00		at Loyola	L 64-74	9-7 (2-2)	Joseph J. Gentile Center (2,348); Chicago, IL
Jan 21, 2006; 7:05		at Youngstown State	L 62-64	9-8 (2-3)	Beeghly Center (4,211); Youngstown, OH
Jan 25, 2006; 7:00		at Cleveland State	W 55-51	10-8 (3-3)	Wolstein Center (1,515); Cleveland, OH
Jan 28, 2006; 2:00		Wright State	W 70-62	11-8 (4-3)	Hinkle Fieldhouse (6,654); Indianapolis, IN
Jan 30, 2006; 8:00		at UIC	W 67-39	12-8 (5-3)	UIC Pavilion (2,077); Chicago, IL
Feb 2, 2006; 7:00		Green Bay	W 72-66	13-8 (6-3)	Hinkle Fieldhouse (3,044); Indianapolis, IN
Feb 4, 2006; 7:00		Milwaukee	W 63-60 ^{OT}	14-8 (7-3)	Hinkle Fieldhouse (7,101); Indianapolis, IN
Feb 8, 2006; 7:05		Cleveland State	W 78-49	15-8 (8-3)	Hinkle Fieldhouse (2,677); Indianapolis, IN
Feb 11, 2006; 7:00		at Wright State	L 83-86	15-9 (8-4)	Nutter Center (7,029); Dayton, OH
Feb 13, 2006; 8:05		at Green Bay	W 63-57	16-9 (9-4)	Resch Center (3,892); Green Bay, WI
Feb 16, 2006; 7:00		Loyola	W 62-50	17-9 (10-4)	Hinkle Fieldhouse (3,187); Indianapolis, IN
Feb 18, 2006*; 12:30, ESPNU		at Kent State; BracketBuster	L 76-80	17-10	Memorial Athletic and Convocation Center (5,071); Kent, OH
Feb 22, 2006; 7:00		Youngstown State	W 72-64	18-10 (11-4)	Hinkle Fieldhouse (5,325); Indianapolis, IN
Feb 25, 2006; 4:05		at Detroit	L 71-73	18-11 (11-5)	Calihan Hall (5,142); Detroit, MI
Horizon League tournament
Mar 4, 2006; 4:30, ESNPU	(2)	vs. (3) Green Bay; Semifinals	W 73-51	19-11	U.S. Cellular Arena (7,502); Milwaukee, WI
Mar 7, 2006; 9:00, ESPN	(2)	at (1) Milwaukee; Championship	L 71-87	19-12	U.S. Cellular Arena (10,021); Milwaukee, WI
NIT
Mar 14, 2006*; 7:00	(7 C)	(8 C) Miami (OH); Opening Round	W 53-52	20-12	Hinkle Fieldhouse (3,088); Indianapolis, IN
Mar 17*; 7:00	(7 C)	at (2 C) Florida State; First Round	L 63-67	20-13	Donald L. Tucker Center (5,187); Tallahassee, FL
*Non-conference game. ^{#}Rankings from AP Poll. (#) Tournament seedings in parentheses. C=Cincinnati Region. All times are in Eastern Time.
