= 1980 PBA Invitational championship =

- Duration: August 16 - September 6, 1980
- TV partner(s): GTV/MBS

Finals
- Champions: Nicholas Stoodley
- Runners-up: Toyota Tamaraws

PBA Invitational championship chronology
- < 1979 1982 >

PBA conference chronology
- < 1980 Open 1980 All-Filipino >

The 1980 PBA Invitational championship was a short tournament featuring two foreign teams and the top three local squads of the Open Conference. It started on August 16 and ended on September 6, 1980.

== Format ==
The following format will be observed for the duration of the tournament:

- Two round-robin eliminations; 8 games per team; teams are then seeded by basis on win–loss records. In case of a tie, a superior quotient will determine a tie-breaker.
- The top two teams after the two round-robins will advance to the best-of-three finals series. The next two dispute third place also in a best-of-three series.

== Opening ceremonies ==
The muses for the participating teams are as follows:

Team	Muse
Adidas/France	(Miss Young 1980 - France)
Nicholas Stoodley/USA	
Toyota Tamaraws	Unnur Steinsson (Miss Young 1980 - Iceland)
U-Tex Wranglers	(Miss Young 1980 - Austria)
Walk Tall Jeans	Ma. Felicidad Luis (Miss Young 1980 - Philippines)

== Elimination round ==
Qualified for finals
Qualified for battle for third

#	Team standings	W	L	PCT	GB
1	Nicholas Stoodley (USA)	5	3	.625	--
2	Toyota Tamaraws	5	3	.625	--
3	Adidas Rubberworld (France)	5	3	.625	--
4	Walk Tall Jeansmakers	5	3	.625	--
5	U/Tex Wranglers	0	8	.000	5

The end of the eliminations saw a four-way tie, with the application of the Asian quotient system of breaking ties, Stoodley/USA finish first with plus 39 quotient, Toyota finish second with a plus 16, Adidas at third with plus 15 and Crispa Walk Tall was last with plus 11.

== Battle-for-third ==
MBS

September 5

Adidas Rubberworld W, Walk Tall Jeans L

Araneta Coliseum, Quezon City

MBS

September 6

Adidas Rubberworld 102, Walk Tall Jeans 100 (OT)
Adidas wins series, 2-0

Araneta Coliseum, Quezon City

== Finals ==
1980 PBA Invitational championship finals
Team	Coach	Wins
Nicholas Stoodley	Jerry Webber	2
Toyota Tamaraws	Fort Acuña	0
- Dates: September 5 & 6, 1980
- Television: MBS

PBA Invitational championship finals chronology
- < 1979 1982 >

PBA finals chronology
- < 1980 All-Filipino 1982 Open >

The 1980 Philippine Basketball Association (PBA) Invitational championship finals was the best-of-3 basketball championship series of the 1982 PBA Invitational Conference, and the conclusion of the conference's playoffs. Nicholas Stoodley and Crispa Redmanizers played for the 25th championship contested by the league.

Guest team Nicholas Stoodley won the championship.

=== Series scoring summary ===
The following scoring summary is written in a line score format, except that the quarter numbers are replaced by game numbers.

Team	Game 1	Game 2	Wins
Nicholas	120	118	2
Toyota	112	113	0

† denotes the number of overtimes

MBS

September 5

Nicholas Stoodley 120, Toyota Tamaraws 112

Araneta Coliseum, Quezon City

MBS

September 6

Nicholas Stoodley 118, Toyota Tamaraws 113
Nicholas Stoodley wins series, 2-0

Araneta Coliseum, Quezon City

The Tamaraws raced to a 76-62 lead early in the third period, but Larry Pounds, Ollie Matson and Ron Richardson pulled the Americans back into the game at 83-86. Kenny Tyler pushed Nicholas Stoodley ahead for only the second time at 106-105. With the Tamaraws missing easy baskets and connecting two free throws from four attempts, Tyler's back-to-back hits stayed the Americans in front, 112-107. Tyler proved to be the main man for Stoodley, his 15-foot jumper with 30 seconds left preserve their victory.
