= 2005–06 Milwaukee Panthers men's basketball team =

American college basketball season

2005–06 Milwaukee Panthers men's basketball

Horizon League tournament champions

NCAA tournament, second round
- Conference: Horizon League
- Record: 22–9 (12–4 Horizon)
- Head coach: Rob Jeter (1st season)
- Assistant coaches: Duffy Conroy (2nd season); Chad Boudreau (1st season)
- Home arena: U.S. Cellular Arena; Klotsche Center

2005–06 Horizon League men's basketball standings
	Conf.				Overall
Team	W		L	PCT	W		L	PCT
Milwaukee †	12	–	4	.750	22	–	9	.710
Butler	11	–	5	.688	20	–	13	.606
Loyola (IL)	8	–	8	.500	19	–	11	.633
UIC	8	–	8	.500	16	–	15	.516
Detroit	8	–	8	.500	16	–	16	.500
Green Bay	8	–	8	.500	15	–	16	.484
Wright State	8	–	8	.500	13	–	15	.464
Cleveland State	5	–	11	.313	10	–	18	.357
Youngstown State	4	–	12	.250	7	–	21	.250
† 2006 Horizon League Tournament winner As of August 1, 2010; Rankings from AP Poll

The 2005–06 Milwaukee Panthers men's basketball team represented the University of Wisconsin–Milwaukee during the 2005–06 NCAA Division I men's basketball season. The Panthers, led by head coach Rob Jeter, played their home games at the U.S. Cellular Arena and Klotsche Center and were members of the Horizon League. They finished the season 22–9, 12–4 in Horizon League play to finish in first place. They were champions of the Horizon League tournament to earn an automatic bid to the NCAA tournament where they received a #11 seed and defeated #6 seed Oklahoma before losing to the eventual National Champion #3 seed Florida in the second round.

== Roster ==
2005–06 Milwaukee Panthers men's basketball team
Players
Coaches

Pos.	#	Name	Height	Weight	Year	Hometown
G	2	Chris Hill	5 ft 10 in (1.78 m)	160 lb (73 kg)	Sr	Whitney Young	Chicago, Illinois
G	4	Mark Pancratz	6 ft 3 in (1.91 m)	185 lb (84 kg)	Sr	Schaumburg	Schaumburg, Illinois
G	12	Allan Hanson	6 ft 0 in (1.83 m)	170 lb (77 kg)	So	East	Wauwatosa, Wisconsin
F	13	Joah Tucker	6 ft 5 in (1.96 m)	220 lb (100 kg)	Sr	Bradley	Milwaukee, Wisconsin
G	14	Derrick Wimmer	6 ft 4 in (1.93 m)	175 lb (79 kg)	Jr	Chicago State	Milwaukee, Wisconsin
G	20	Myles McKay	6 ft 3 in (1.91 m)	180 lb (82 kg)	So	Menomonee Falls	Menomonee Falls, Wisconsin
F	21	Jason McCoy	6 ft 9 in (2.06 m)	190 lb (86 kg)	Sr	Rutgers	Houston, Texas
G	24	Boo Davis	6 ft 3 in (1.91 m)	190 lb (86 kg)	Sr	Olney CC	Chicago, Illinois
G	33	Nick Hansen	6 ft 5 in (1.96 m)	200 lb (91 kg)	Jr	West	Appleton, Wisconsin
F	40	Michael Bendall	6 ft 7 in (2.01 m)	210 lb (95 kg)	So	Oconomowoc	Oconomowoc, Wisconsin
F	44	Adrian Tigert	6 ft 7 in (2.01 m)	240 lb (109 kg)	Sr	West	Oshkosh, Wisconsin
C	50	Derrick Ford	6 ft 10 in (2.08 m)	240 lb (109 kg)	Sr	Olney CC	Toledo, Ohio

Head coach

- Rob Jeter (UW–Platteville)

Assistant coach(es)

- Chad Boudreau (Hannibal–LaGrange)
- Duffy Conroy (St. Ambrose)

Legend

- (C) Team captain
- (S) Suspended
- (I) Ineligible
- (W) Walk-on
- Injured
- Current redshirt

Roster

== Schedule ==
Date time, TV	Rank^{#}	Opponent^{#}	Result	Record	Site (attendance) city, state
Exhibition games
Nov 2, 2005*; 8:00 pm		Parkside	W 69–46		U.S. Cellular Arena; Milwaukee, WI
Nov 8, 2005*; 7:00 pm		Platteville	W 63–47		U.S. Cellular Arena; Milwaukee, WI
Regular season
Nov 15, 2005*; 7:00 pm		at No. 12 Memphis; NIT Season Tip-Off	L 52–79	0–1	FedExForum (10,165); Memphis, TN
Nov 21, 2005*; 7:00 pm		Upper Iowa	W 93–64	1–1	U.S. Cellular Arena (2,736); Milwaukee, WI
Nov 28, 2005*; 8:00 pm		at Tennessee Tech	L 67–72	1–2	Eblen Center (2,612); Cookeville, TN
Dec 3, 2005*; 8:00 pm		Saint Louis	W 82–71	2–2	U.S. Cellular Arena (4,235); Milwaukee, WI
Dec 6, 2005*; 7:00 pm		at South Dakota State	W 76–51	3–2	Frost Arena (2,121); Brookings, SD
Dec 10, 2005*; 7:00 pm		Hawaii	W 58–52	4–2	U.S. Cellular Arena (4,325); Milwaukee, WI
Dec 15, 2005*; 7:00 pm, ESPN		at Wisconsin	L 68–74	4–3	Kohl Center (17,142); Madison, WI
Dec 17, 2005; 7:00 pm		Green Bay	W 80–60	5–3 (1–0)	U.S. Cellular Arena (5,354); Milwaukee, WI
Dec 21, 2005*; 7:00 pm		Oakland	W 83–60	6–3	U.S. Cellular Arena (3,210); Milwaukee, WI
Dec 27, 2005*; 8:00 pm		at Wyoming	W 84–69	7–3	Arena-Auditorium (5,298); Laramie, WY
Dec 30, 2005*; 8:00 pm		at Montana	W 78–74	8–3	Dahlberg Arena (7,213); Missoula, MT
Jan 2, 2006; 7:00 pm		Cleveland State	W 75–68	9–3 (2–0)	U.S. Cellular Arena (3,153); Milwaukee, WI
Jan 5, 2006; 7:30 pm		at UIC	W 68–45	10–3 (3–0)	UIC Pavilion (4,008); Chicago, IL
Jan 7, 2006; 7:00 pm		Butler	W 64–59	11–3 (4–0)	U.S. Cellular Arena (5,512); Milwaukee, WI
Jan 11, 2006; 7:00 pm		Loyola (IL)	W 78–75	12–3 (5–0)	U.S. Cellular Arena (5,133); Milwaukee, WI
Jan 14, 2006; 3:00 pm		at Green Bay	L 77–84	12–4 (5–1)	Resch Center (6,495); Green Bay, WI
Jan 18, 2006; 6:00 pm		at Detroit	W 72–71	13–4 (6–1)	Calihan Hall (2,386); Detroit, MI
Jan 21, 2006; 7:00 pm		Wright State	W 61–54	14–4 (7–1)	U.S. Cellular Arena (6,637); Milwaukee, WI
Jan 26, 2006; 6:30 pm		at Youngstown State	W 78–70	15–4 (8–1)	Beeghly Center (2,082); Youngstown, OH
Jan 30, 2006; 7:00 pm		at Loyola (IL)	W 68–57	16–4 (9–1)	Joseph J. Gentile Center (2,569); Chicago, IL
Feb 2, 2006; 6:00 pm		at Wright State	L 54–59	16–5 (9–2)	Nutter Center (6,595); Fairborn, OH
Feb 4, 2006; 1:00 pm		at Butler	L 60–63 ^{OT}	16–6 (9–3)	Hinkle Fieldhouse (7,101); Indianapolis, IN
Feb 9, 2006; 7:30 pm		Youngstown State	W 98–57	17–6 (10–3)	U.S. Cellular Arena (5,324); Milwaukee, WI
Feb 11, 2006; 4:30 pm		at Cleveland State	W 86–57	18–6 (11–3)	Wolstein Center (2,074); Cleveland, OH
Feb 15, 2006; 7:00 pm		UIC	L 86–94 ^{OT}	18–7 (11–4)	U.S. Cellular Arena (4,564); Milwaukee, WI
Feb 18, 2006*; 1:00 pm		Missouri State; ESPN BracketBusters	L 63–72	18–8	U.S. Cellular Arena (6,660); Milwaukee, WI
Feb 21, 2006; 7:00 pm		Detroit	W 76–57	19–8 (12–4)	U.S. Cellular Arena (5,206); Milwaukee, WI
Horizon League tournament
Mar 4, 2006; 6:00 pm	(1)	(4) Loyola (IL); Semifinals	W 80–66	20–8	U.S. Cellular Arena (7,502); Milwaukee, WI
Mar 7, 2006; 8:00 pm, ESPN	(1)	(2) Butler; Championship	W 87–71	21–8	U.S. Cellular Arena (10,021); Milwaukee, WI
NCAA tournament
Mar 16, 2006*; 11:25 am	(11 MSP)	vs. (6 MSP) No. 24 Oklahoma; First Round	W 82–74	22–8	Jacksonville Veterans Memorial Arena; Jacksonville, Florida
Mar 18, 2006*; 2:20 pm, CBS	(11 MSP)	vs. (3 MSP) No. 11 Florida; Second Round	L 60–82	22–9	Jacksonville Veterans Memorial Arena (13,777); Jacksonville, Florida
*Non-conference game. ^{#}Rankings from AP Poll. (#) Tournament seedings in parentheses. MSP=Minneapolis. All times are in Central Time.

== 2006 Horizon League Tournament ==
First Round; Tuesday, February 28
4	Loyola	76
9	Youngstown State	61
5	Detroit	92
8	Cleveland State	58
6	UIC	77
7	Wright State	67

Second Round; Friday, March 3
4	Loyola	64
5	Detroit	55
3	Green Bay	76
6	UIC	66

Semifinals; Saturday, March 4
1	Milwaukee	80
4	Loyola	66
2	Butler	73
3	Green Bay	51

Championship; Tuesday, March 7
1	Milwaukee	87
2	Butler	71

First round games at campus sites of higher seeds
Second round and semifinals hosted by the top seed. Championship hosted by best remaining seed
