= 1980 Toyota Tamaraws season =

- Head coach: Fort Acuña
- Owner: Delta Motor Corporation

Open Conference results
- Record: 22–8 (73.3%)
- Place: 2nd
- Playoff finish: Finals

Invitational Conference results
- Record: 5–5 (50%)
- Place: 2nd
- Playoff finish: Finals

All-Filipino Conference results
- Record: 13–8 (61.9%)
- Place: 2nd
- Playoff finish: Finals

Toyota Tamaraws seasons

The 1980 Toyota Tamaraws season was the sixth season of the franchise in the Philippine Basketball Association (PBA).

== Colors ==
(dark)
(light)

== Summary ==
During the off-season, the team signed rookies Leopoldo Herrera and Eduardo Merced, both players were from their farm team Frigidaire/MAN Diesel in the MICAA. Danny Florencio rejoined the Tamaraws after disappearing for the whole of the 1979 season while imports Andrew Fields and Bruce "Sky" King were back to reinforce the squad.

Toyota started the Open Conference by winning eight of their first nine games, losing only to defending champion Royal Tru-Orange. After 18 games in the elimination round, the Tamaraws were at first place with 15 wins and three losses. In the semifinal round, the Tamaraws were tied with Crispa Walk Tall and U/Tex with four wins and two losses. The Wranglers earn the first ticket to the championship round and Toyota had to beat Walk Tall Jeans, 102-100, in a playoff game on July 22 for the right to meet U/Tex in the finals.

The best-of-five title series went into a full route and in the deciding fifth game, the Tamaraws were 16 seconds away in regulation time to win the Open Crown after leading by four points, 94-90, but U/Tex were able to force overtime behind their imports Aaron James and Glenn McDonald, who sank the two free throws that tied the count. The Wranglers won by one point, 99–98 in the extension period.

The Second Conference Invitational features foreign squads Nicholas Stoodley of the United States and Adidas Rubberworld of France. Toyota won their last three matches to march into the finals against Nicholas Stoodley. The Tamaraws needed to win by at least seven points against Crispa Walk Tall Jeans in their last assignment and they did just that in a 116–109 victory. In the best-of-three title series, the Tamaraws got blanked by the Americans.

For the third time in the season, the Tamaraws ended up bridesmaid and placed runner-up in all three conferences of the year, duplicating the same feat back in 1976. Crispa Redmanizers' domination in the All-Filipino Conference had Toyota behind Crispa in the team standings during the eliminations, quarterfinals and semifinal phase and they lost to the Redmanizers in four games in the best-of-five championship series.

== Notable dates ==
March 16: Opening before one of the biggest crowds to attend at the Araneta Coliseum, the league's 6th season also introduced the three-point line. Toyota repulses arch rival Crispa in the second game, 112–107, as Sonny Jaworski came up with three conversions from the three-point area to finish with 22 points.

June 12: Toyota Tamaraws nips Crispa Walk Tall Jeans, 107-105, before an overflow crowd of 32,000 at the Big Dome on Independence Day.

July 22: Toyota and Crispa dispute the last finals slot and with the capacity crowd of 25,000 fans on hand to watch the do-or-die game, the Tamaraws win in a classic 102–100 victory.

== Occurrences ==
In Game three of the All-Filipino Conference finals, the Toyota Tamaraws stopped the Crispa Redmanizers' winning run of 19 straight wins in a 97–94 victory but the Toyota players saw the ouster of their coach Fort Acuña at halftime when he refuses to field in Sonny Jaworski in the first two quarters of the game.

== Win–loss record vs opponents ==
Teams	Win	Loss	1st (Open)	2nd (Invitational)	3rd (All-Filipino)
Galleon Shippers	2	1	1-1	N/A	1–0
Gilbey’s Gin	4	1	2-0	N/A	2–1
Great Taste / Presto	5	0	4-0	N/A	1–0
Honda	2	1	1-1	N/A	1–0
Royal / San Miguel	2	2	1-1	N/A	1–1
Tanduay	5	0	2-0	N/A	3–0
Tefilin	3	0	2-0	N/A	1–0
U-Tex Wranglers	9	4	5-4	2-0	2-0
Walk Tall / Crispa	6	8	4-1	1-1	1–6
Adidas (France)	1	1	N/A	1–1	N/A
Nicholas Stoodley (USA)	1	3	N/A	1–3	N/A
Total	40	21	22-8	5-5	13-8

== Roster ==
Toyota Tamaraws roster
Players
Coaches

Pos.	No.	Nat.	Name	Ht.	Wt.
C	1	(United States)	Andrew Fields (I)	6 ft 8 in (2.03 m)		Cheyney
F/C	6	(Philippines)	Abe King	6 ft 3 in (1.91 m)		San Beda
G	7	(Philippines)	Robert Jaworski	6 ft 0 in (1.83 m)		UE
G	8	(Philippines)	Francis Arnaiz	5 ft 10 in (1.78 m)		Ateneo
G	9	(Philippines)	Eduardo Merced	6 ft 0 in (1.83 m)		José Rizal
F/C	10	(Philippines)	Ramon Fernandez	6 ft 4 in (1.93 m)		San Carlos
G/F	11	(Philippines)	Arnie Tuadles	6 ft 2 in (1.88 m)		Visayas
G	12	(Philippines)	Pablo Javier	5 ft 11 in (1.80 m)		Far Eastern
G	14	(Philippines)	Rino Salazar	5 ft 9 in (1.75 m)		Letran
F	18	(Philippines)	Emerito Legaspi	5 ft 11 in (1.80 m)		UE
F	20	(Philippines)	Nicanor Bulaong	6 ft 3 in (1.91 m)		Far Eastern
F	41	(Philippines)	Leopoldo Herrera	6 ft 3 in (1.91 m)		Wesleyan Philippines
F/C	43	(United States)	Bruce King (I)	6 ft 8 in (2.03 m)		Iowa
G/F	44	(Philippines)	Danny Florencio	5 ft 10 in (1.78 m)		UST

Head coach

- (Philippines) Fort Acuña

Assistant coach(es)

Legend

- (C) Team captain
- (I) Import
- Injured
