= Milwaukee Panthers men's basketball =

American men's college basketball team

2026–27 Milwaukee Panthers men's basketball team
- University: University of Wisconsin–Milwaukee
- First season: 1898
- Head coach: Bart Lundy (5th season)
- Location: Milwaukee, Wisconsin
- Arena: UWM Panther Arena (capacity: 10,783)
- Conference: Horizon League
- Nickname: Panthers
- Colors: Black and gold

NCAA Division I tournament Sweet Sixteen
- 2005

NCAA Division I tournament appearances
- 2003, 2005, 2006, 2014

NCAA Division II tournament Elite Eight
- 1989
Other NCAA Division II tournament results
Sweet Sixteen	1989
Appearances	1960, 1989

NCAA Division III tournament appearances
- 1982

Conference tournament champions
- Horizon: 2003, 2005, 2006, 2014

Conference regular-season champions
- WIAC: 1913, 1934, 1940, 1941, 1943, 1948, 1960; Horizon: 2004, 2005, 2006, 2011

Uniforms
Home	Away	Alternate

The Milwaukee Panthers men's basketball team is an NCAA Division I college basketball team competing in the Horizon League for the University of Wisconsin–Milwaukee. They play their home games at UW–Milwaukee Panther Arena in Milwaukee, Wisconsin, and are currently coached by Bart Lundy. The Panthers have made four NCAA Tournament tournament appearances, most recently in 2014.

== History ==
UWM's predecessor institutions (Milwaukee Normal School, Milwaukee State Teachers College and Milwaukee State College) have competed in basketball since the 19th century as the Milwaukee Normals (1896–1927) and Milwaukee State Green Gulls (1927–1956).

Milwaukee State's only undefeated season came in 1940 under head coach Guy Penwell as the Green Gulls finished the year 16–0 en route to their third Wisconsin State Conference championship.

The team competed under the University of Wisconsin-Milwaukee name for the first time for the 1956–57 season. In honor of joining the University of Wisconsin System, they sported the cardinal red and white colors and adopted "Cardinals" as their nickname. Three years later, the Cardinals made their first post-season appearance in the 1960 NCAA Men's Division II Basketball Tournament.

=== 1965–1998: Becoming the Panthers; up to Division I ===
Seeking to establish their own identity, Milwaukee adopted the colors of black and gold on September 1, 1965, and became known as the Panthers. They also left the Wisconsin State College Conference (now the Wisconsin Intercollegiate Athletic Conference), of which they had been members since 1913, to form a conference with other urban public universities in the Great Lakes region such as Illinois-Chicago and Cleveland State. Such plans for a new conference never materialized, and the Panthers remained independent even as they moved from the NCAA College Division (now NCAA Division II and NCAA Division III) to the University Division (now NCAA Division I) in 1973.

The team moved again to NCAA Division III in 1980. Between 1985 and 1987, Milwaukee competed in the National Association of Intercollegiate Athletics. In 1987, the program moved to NCAA Division II where it won its regional in the 1989 NCAA Division II men's basketball tournament, advancing to the contest's Elite Eight. Since 1990, Milwaukee Men's Basketball has competed in NCAA Division I. They played in the Mid-Continent Conference for one year in 1993–94 before joining the Midwestern Collegiate Conference, which became the Horizon League in 1999 and has been the Panthers' home ever since.

=== 1999–2001: Bo Ryan era ===
In 1999, the Panthers hired Bo Ryan, a highly successful Division III coach at UW–Plattville, as the team's new head coach. Under Ryan, the Panthers had their first consecutive winning seasons since 1993, and Ryan was also instrumental in bringing wider attention and fan enthusiasm to the program. After just two seasons, Ryan left to become the head coach of the Wisconsin Badgers.

=== 2002–2005: Bruce Pearl era ===
After Bo Ryan's departure, Milwaukee would hire Bruce Pearl, a successful Division II coach at Southern Indiana, as head coach. Milwaukee reached new heights of success during the mid-2000s, making its first NCAA Men's Division I Basketball Championship appearance in 2003 under Pearl, followed by a Sweet Sixteen appearance in 2005 and a second-round appearance in 2006. Pearl left to become the head coach at Tennessee after 2005 and the school hired Rob Jeter, a former assistant under Bo Ryan. The Panthers won three straight regular-season Horizon League championships from 2004 to 2006 as well as the Horizon League tournament championship in 2003, 2005, and 2006.

=== 2006–2015: Rob Jeter era ===
The Panthers' most recent Horizon League regular season championship came in 2011, where they'd host the Horizon League Championship game, but lost to Butler. In 2014, the Panthers won the Horizon League tournament, making their first NCAA tournament appearance since 2006. Just a few weeks later, UWM was handed a one-year postseason ban due to a low Academic Progress Rate. Under Jeter, while the Panthers were mostly competitive, they were unable to stay consistently on top in the Horizon League standings.

On March 17, 2016, Milwaukee fired Rob Jeter after 11 seasons with the Panthers.

=== 2016–2021: LaVall Jordan and Pat Baldwin eras ===
On April 7, 2016, Milwaukee announced that Michigan assistant coach LaVall Jordan would be the new head coach.

Less than one year later, on March 3, 2017, the Panthers made history by being the first No. 10 seed to win a game in the Horizon League Tournament. They went on to place second overall in the tournament, losing to Northern Kentucky in the championship game on March 7. After this one lone season, Jordan accepted the head coaching job at Butler. On June 20, Milwaukee hired Northwestern assistant coach Pat Baldwin as their new head coach.

In 2021, the Panthers made national news when they were able to successfully recruit Baldwin's son Patrick Baldwin Jr., who was rated by ESPN as the number four rated recruit in the country, becoming the highest rated player to commit to a Horizon League school. Baldwin Jr. struggled with injury in his freshman season, and the Panthers finished the season 10–22. On March 2, 2022, Pat Baldwin was fired as head coach after five straight losing seasons. Patrick Baldwin Jr. declared for the 2022 NBA draft, where he was selected 28th overall by the Golden State Warriors, becoming the first player in program history to be selected in the first round.

=== 2022–Present: Bart Lundy era ===
On March 18, 2022, the Panthers hired Bart Lundy, a successful Division II coach at Queens (NC), as the team's next head coach. In Lundy's first season, the Panthers won 20 regular season games for the first time since 2004–05, finishing second in the Horizon League before losing in the semifinals of the conference tournament to Cleveland State. Milwaukee accepted an invite to the 2023 College Basketball Invitational, their first postseason appearance since the 2014 NCAA tournament. The Panthers defeated Stetson in overtime in the first round, marking their first postseason tournament victory since 2006, before losing to eventual champions Charlotte in the quarterfinals.

In 2023–24, despite high hopes, the Panthers struggled through much of the season, mainly due to injuries to key players. The team still rallied to advance to the Horizon League Championship game before losing to Oakland, finishing with a record of 20–15, which was also the first time since 2006 that the Panthers had consecutive 20-win seasons. Lundy also became the first coach in the program's history to have 20-win seasons in each of his first two seasons coaching the team. The Panthers continued to have regular-season success in 2024–25, winning 21 games, helped primarily by two transfers: guard Themus Fulks and forward Jermichael Stillwell, the latter earning national player of the week honors during the season. Lundy's record of consecutive 20-win seasons continued, but the Panthers lost in their first Horizon League conference tournament game, once again to Oakland, to finish 21–11. Fulks and Stillwell would transfer to UCF after the season.

The Panthers had high expectations going into 2025–26, predicted to finish first in the Horizon League, but the team was hit hard by season-ending injuries to three of their projected five starters: John Lovelace Jr., Seth Hubbard, and Danilio Jovanovich. Forced to play most of their bench, including two true freshmen in Stevie Elam and Josh Dixon, the Panthers would suffer their first losing season in the Lundy era, going 12–20.

== Milwaukee wins vs. the AP Top 25 ==
Year	Opponent	Date	Score	Site
2004-05	#21 Alabama #14 Boston College	March 17, 2005; March 19, 2005	W 83–73; W 83–75	Neutral (Cleveland, OH); Neutral (Cleveland, OH)
2005-06	#24 Oklahoma	March 16, 2006	W 82–74	Neutral (Jacksonville, FL)
2008-09	#21 Butler	March 18, 2009	W 63–60	Home

== Postseason ==
=== NCAA Division I Tournament results ===
The Panthers have appeared in the NCAA Division I tournament four times. Their combined record is 3–4.

Year	Seed	Round	Opponent	Result
2003	#12	First round	#5 Notre Dame	L 69–70
2005	#12	First round Second Round; Sweet Sixteen	#5 Alabama #4 Boston College #1 Illinois	W 83–73; W 83–75; L 63–77
2006	#11	First round Second Round	#6 Oklahoma #3 Florida	W 82–74; L 60–82
2014	#15	First round	#2 Villanova	L 53–73

=== NCAA Division II Tournament results ===
The Panthers have appeared in the NCAA Division II tournament two times. Their combined record is 3–2.

Year	Round	Opponent	Result
1960	Regional semifinals Regional 3rd-place game	Lincoln (MO); Augustana (IL)	L 92–100; W 109–82
1989	Regional semifinals Regional Finals; Elite Eight	Augustana (SD); Northern Colorado; Southeast Missouri State	W 99–95; W 89–88 ^{OT} L 84–93

=== NCAA Division III Tournament results ===
The Panthers have appeared in the NCAA Division III tournament one time. Their record is 1–1.

Year	Round	Opponent	Result
1982	Regional semifinals Regional 3rd Place	Augustana (IL); Beloit	L 63–70; W 75–73

=== NIT results ===
The Panthers have appeared in the National Invitation Tournament (NIT) two times. Their combined record is 1–2.

Year	Round	Opponent	Result
2004	Opening Round; First round	Rice; Boise State	W 91–53; L 70–73
2011	First round	Northwestern	L 61–70

=== CBI results ===
The Panthers have appeared in the College Basketball Invitational (CBI) two times. Their record is 1–2.

Year	Round	Opponent	Result
2012	First round	TCU	L 73–83
2023	First round Quarterfinals	#6 Stetson #3 Charlotte	W 87–83 ^{OT} L 65–76

== Conferences ==
Years	Conference	Win–loss record	Win–loss pct.	Seasons
1896–1913	Independent	N/A	N/A	17
1913–1964	Wisconsin Intercollegiate Athletic Conference (WIAC)	N/A	N/A	51
1964–1973	NCAA College Division Independent	412–346	.544	9
1973–1980	NCAA Division I Independent	412–346	.544	7
1980–1985	NCAA Division III Independent	412–346	.544	5
1985–1987	NAIA Independent	412–346	.544	2
1987–1990	NCAA Division II Independent	412–346	.544	3
1990–1993	NCAA Division I Independent	412–346	.544	3
1993–1994	Mid-Continent Conference (Note: Currently known as the Summit League since 2007.)	7–11	.388	1
1994–present	Horizon League (Note: Formerly known as the Midwestern Collegiate Conference (MCC) until 2001.)	227–237	.489	30

== Home arenas ==
Years	Arena
1956–1977	Baker Fieldhouse
1977–1992; 1998–2003; 2012–present	J. Martin Klotsche Center
1992–1998	The Milwaukee Exposition, Convention Center and Arena (The MECCA)
2003–2012	U.S. Cellular Arena
2013–present	UW–Milwaukee Panther Arena

== Milwaukee–Green Bay rivalry records ==
Milwaukee victories	Green Bay victories	Tie games

No.	Date	Location	Winner	Score
1	1971	N/A	Green Bay	82–75
2	1979	N/A	Green Bay	58–57
3	1980	N/A	Green Bay	57–53
4	1980	N/A	Green Bay	70–50
5	1993	Milwaukee, WI	Milwaukee	75–68
6	1993	Green Bay, WI	Milwaukee	61–48
7	1994	Milwaukee, WI	Green Bay	64–42
8	1994	Green Bay, WI	Milwaukee	58–55
9	1995	Milwaukee, WI	Green Bay	79–58
10	1995	Green Bay, WI	Green Bay	63–43
11	1996	Milwaukee, WI	Green Bay	67–54
12	1996	Green Bay, WI	Green Bay	81–66
13	1997	Green Bay, WI	Green Bay	62–49
14	1997	Milwaukee, WI	Green Bay	62–46
15	1998	Milwaukee, WI	Green Bay	68–51
16	1998	Green Bay, WI	Green Bay	80–72
17	1999	Green Bay, WI	Green Bay	74–66
18	1999	Milwaukee, WI	Milwaukee	59–57
19	1999	Chicago, IL	Green Bay	72–66
20	2000	Green Bay, WI	Green Bay	67–65
21	2000	Milwaukee, WI	Milwaukee	67–42
22	2000	Chicago, IL	Milwaukee	62–58
23	2001	Green Bay, WI	Green Bay	53–49
24	2001	Milwaukee, WI	Milwaukee	79–57
25	2002	Milwaukee, WI	Milwaukee	63–51
26	2002	Green Bay, WI	Milwaukee	76–66
27	2003	Green Bay, WI	Green Bay	79–68
28	2003	Milwaukee, WI	Milwaukee	78–54
29	2004	Green Bay, WI	Milwaukee	82–70
30	2004	Milwaukee, WI	Milwaukee	81–70
31	2005	Milwaukee, WI	Milwaukee	86–56
32	2005	Green Bay, WI	Green Bay	76–72
33	2006	Milwaukee, WI	Milwaukee	80–60
34	2006	Green Bay, WI	Green Bay	84–77
35	2007	Milwaukee, WI	Green Bay	73–67
36	2007	Green Bay, WI	Milwaukee	74–73
37	2008	Green Bay, WI	Milwaukee	65–61
38	2008	Milwaukee, WI	Milwaukee	76–66
39	2009	Milwaukee, WI	Green Bay	77–75
40	2009	Green Bay, WI	Green Bay	72–68

No.	Date	Location	Winner	Score
41	2010	Milwaukee, WI	Milwaukee	71–51
42	2010	Green Bay, WI	Green Bay	61–54
43	2011	Green Bay, WI	Green Bay	69–64
44	2011	Milwaukee, WI	Milwaukee	88–75
45	2012	Milwaukee, WI	Milwaukee	64–63
46	2012	Green Bay, WI	Milwaukee	81–75
47	2013	Milwaukee, WI	Green Bay	74–54
48	2013	Green Bay, WI	Green Bay	78–61
49	2013	Green Bay, WI	Green Bay	62–46
50	2014	Milwaukee, WI	Green Bay	93–86
51	2014	Green Bay, WI	Milwaukee	73–63
52	2014	Green Bay, WI	Milwaukee	73–66
53	2015	Milwaukee, WI	Green Bay	79–63
54	2015	Green Bay, WI	Green Bay	81–70
55	2016	Milwaukee, WI	Milwaukee	95–94
56	2016	Green Bay, WI	Green Bay	70–68
57	2016	Detroit, MI	Green Bay	70–61
58	2017	Green Bay, WI	Green Bay	80–74
59	2017	Milwaukee, WI	Green Bay	80–56
60	2018	Green Bay, WI	Green Bay	99–92
61	2018	Milwaukee, WI	Milwaukee	76–58
62	2019	Milwaukee, WI	Green Bay	92–82
63	2019	Green Bay, WI	Green Bay	90–74
64	2020	Green Bay, WI	Milwaukee	87–80
65	2020	Milwaukee, WI	Green Bay	94–90
66	2021	Green Bay, WI	Milwaukee	68–65
67	2021	Green Bay, WI	Milwaukee	74–62
68	2022	Green Bay, WI	Milwaukee	63–49
69	2022	Milwaukee, WI	Milwaukee	54–44
70	2022	Green Bay, WI	Milwaukee	81–67
71	2023	Milwaukee, WI	Green Bay	80–79
72	2023	Green Bay, WI	Green Bay	70–58
73	2024	Milwaukee, WI	Milwaukee	90–69
74	2024	Green Bay, WI	Milwaukee	95–84
75	2024	Green Bay, WI	Milwaukee	88–67
76	2025	Milwaukee, WI	Milwaukee	70–59
77	2026	Green Bay, WI	Green Bay	79–76
78	2026	Milwaukee, WI	Milwaukee	75–72
Series: Green Bay leads 42–36

== Players in the NBA draft ==
Year	Player	Round #	Pick #	Overall #	Team
1961	Ron Debillous	10th	1	84	New York Knicks
1971	Vance Tyree	16th	1	225	Cleveland Cavaliers
1977	Larry Pikes	8th	3	154	Milwaukee Bucks
1991	Von McDade	2nd	26	53	New Jersey Nets
2022	Patrick Baldwin Jr.	1st	28	28	Golden State Warriors

== See also ==
- List of Milwaukee Panthers men's basketball seasons
