= Rob Jeter =

American basketball coach (born 1969)

Current position
- Title: Head coach
- Team: Southern Utah
- Conference: Big Sky
- Record: 35–65 (.350)

Biographical details
- Born: May 15, 1969 (age 57); Pittsburgh, Pennsylvania, U.S.

Playing career
- 1987–1991: Wisconsin–Platteville

Coaching career (HC unless noted)
- 1994–1998: Wisconsin–Platteville (assistant)
- 1998–1999: Marquette (assistant)
- 1999–2001: Milwaukee (assistant)
- 2001–2005: Wisconsin (assistant)
- 2005–2016: Milwaukee
- 2016–2018: UNLV (assistant)
- 2018–2020: Minnesota (assistant)
- 2020–2023: Western Illinois
- 2023–present: Southern Utah

Head coaching record
- Overall: 258–280 (.480)
- Tournaments: 1–2 (NCAA); 0–1 (NIT); 0–1 (CBI); 0–1 (TBC)

Accomplishments and honors

Championships
- 2 Horizon League regular season (2006, 2011); 2 Horizon League tournament (2006, 2014)

Awards
- Horizon League Coach of the Year (2011)

Robert DeLafayette Jeter III (born May 15, 1969) is an American college basketball coach and current head coach at Southern Utah.

== Personal life ==
Born in Pittsburgh, Pennsylvania, Jeter grew up in Chicago. His father, Bob (1937–2008), was a Rose Bowl MVP as a halfback for the Iowa Hawkeyes and a second round pick in the 1960 NFL draft. He was later a defensive back in the NFL for the Green Bay Packers under Vince Lombardi and a member of the Packer Hall of Fame and Rose Bowl Hall of Fame. His brother, Carlton Jeter, played basketball alongside him at UW–Platteville. His uncle, Tony Jeter, played football at Nebraska under head coach Bob Devaney and was a tight end in the NFL for two seasons with the Pittsburgh Steelers. Jeter and his wife, Deanna, have three sons, Robert, Jonathan (J.T.) and Jackson, and one daughter, Jolie.

== Playing career ==
Jeter attended high school at Quigley South Preparatory School in Chicago, and then played collegiate basketball at the University of Wisconsin–Platteville, where he played under coach Bo Ryan from 1987 to 1991 as a starting forward. Jeter was the captain of his team when it won the 1991 NCAA Division III tournament and was named to the all-Final Four team. He holds the UW–Platteville records for career field goal percentage (.601) and consecutive starts (89). In his four years playing, UW–Platteville went 102–16 while Jeter was a two-time All-Wisconsin State University Conference selection and two-time All-Midwest Region choice. He was also named to the Wisconsin State University Conference honor roll three times. He graduated with a B.S. in business administration in 1991. He also earned a master's degree in adult education at UW–Platteville in December 2001. Following graduation, he played professionally overseas from 1992 to 1993, with Olivias Futebol Clube in Portugal, leading the Portuguese national league in scoring. Jeter was inducted into the UW–Platteville Athletic Hall of Fame in September 2006.

== Coaching career ==
Jeter returned to his alma mater as an assistant coach in 1994, where he'd stay until 1998 and as part of the Pioneers national title teams in 1995 and 1998 before having a one-year stopover at Marquette under Mike Deane. He'd then reunite with Ryan at Milwaukee, and would subsequently follow Ryan as an assistant coach to Wisconsin.

In four years with the Badgers from 2001 to 2005, He was the Badgers' lead recruiter, while also coordinating Wisconsin's scouting and academic efforts. While at Wisconsin, they won two regular season Big Ten championships and a Big Ten tournament title. They also made four straight NCAA Tournament appearances, including berths in the Sweet 16 in 2003, losing to Kentucky, and the Elite Eight in 2005, losing to North Carolina, who eventually became the national champion. Wisconsin averaged nearly 23 wins per season under Ryan and Jeter and posted a school record 38-game home court winning streak.

In 2005, Jeter was hired to replace Bruce Pearl at Milwaukee, who led the Panthers to the Sweet 16 in the previous season during the 2005 NCAA tournament. Jeter would guide the Panthers to another Horizon League conference and tournament title and a first-round win over Oklahoma in the 2006 NCAA tournament. During the next 10 seasons, Jeter would help the Panthers to another Horizon League regular season title and a berth in the 2011 NIT as well as a 2012 CBI appearance and another Horizon League conference tournament title for a spot in the 2014 NCAA tournament. At the conclusion of the 2015–16 season, Jeter was fired by Milwaukee by Athletic Director Amanda Braun.

Jeter would return to coach, accepting an assistant coaching position at UNLV, where he would stay from 2016 to 2018. He'd then join Richard Pitino's staff at Minnesota.

On March 30, 2020, Jeter was named the 21st head coach at Western Illinois, replacing Billy Wright.

== Head coaching record ==
Record table
| Season | Team | Overall | Conference | Standing | Postseason |
|---|---|---|---|---|---|
Milwaukee Panthers (Horizon League) (2005–2016)
| 2005–06 | Milwaukee | 22–9 | 12–4 | 1st | NCAA Division I Round of 32 |
| 2006–07 | Milwaukee | 9–22 | 6–10 | T–7th | |
| 2007–08 | Milwaukee | 14–16 | 9–9 | T–4th | |
| 2008–09 | Milwaukee | 17–14 | 11–7 | 5th | |
| 2009–10 | Milwaukee | 20–14 | 10–8 | 4th | |
| 2010–11 | Milwaukee | 19–14 | 13–5 | T–1st | NIT first round |
| 2011–12 | Milwaukee | 20–14 | 11–7 | T–3rd | CBI first round |
| 2012–13 | Milwaukee | 8–24 | 3–13 | 9th | |
| 2013–14 | Milwaukee | 21–14 | 7–9 | 5th | NCAA Division I Round of 64 |
| 2014–15 | Milwaukee | 14–16 | 9–7 | 5th | |
| 2015–16 | Milwaukee | 20–13 | 10–8 | 5th | |
| Milwaukee: | | 184–170 (.520) | 101–87 (.537) | | |
Western Illinois Leathernecks (Summit League) (2020–2023)
| 2020–21 | Western Illinois | 7–15 | 5–9 | 7th | |
| 2021–22 | Western Illinois | 16–16 | 7–11 | 6th | TBC first round |
| 2022–23 | Western Illinois | 16–14 | 9–9 | T–4th | |
| Western Illinois: | | 39–45 (.464) | 21–29 (.420) | | |
Southern Utah Thunderbirds (WAC) (2023–2026)
| 2023–24 | Southern Utah | 10–21 | 5–15 | 10th | |
| 2024–25 | Southern Utah | 12–19 | 4–12 | 8th | |
| 2025–26 | Southern Utah | 10–22 | 6–12 | 5th | |
| 2026–27 | Southern Utah | 3-3 | 0-0 | | |
| Southern Utah: | | 35–65 (.350) | 15–39 (.278) | | |
| Total: | | 258–280 (.480) | | | |
National champion Postseason invitational champion Conference regular season champion Conference regular season and conference tournament champion Division regular season champion Division regular season and conference tournament champion Conference tournament champion
