= Tucson Gunners =

Minor league pro basketball team (1978 to 1979)

- Sport: Basketball
- Founded: 1978
- Folded: 1979
- League: Western Basketball Association
- Based in: Tucson, Arizona
- Arena: Tucson Community Center
- Championships: 1 (1979)

The Tucson Gunners are a defunct minor professional basketball team based in Tucson, Arizona. They played in the Western Basketball Association and won the league's first and only championship Notable players included Al Smith, Gerald Henderson, and future coach Jim Boylan.
