= Western Basketball Association =

- Founded: 1978
- Folded: 1979
- No. of teams: 7
- Country: United States

The Western Basketball Association was formed in 1978 and played for one season during 1978–79. Organized by Larry Creger, a former assistant coach in the National Basketball Association (NBA) and American Basketball Association (ABA), and real estate developer Neil Christianson.

== Format ==
The team rosters were limited to 11 players with a nine-man travel squad and a $10,000 standard player salary and $82,000 roster maximum. The completed schedule was 48 games.

== Teams ==
The seven-team league comprised the Fresno Stars, Montana Sky (Great Falls, Montana), Las Vegas Dealers, Reno Bighorns, Salt Lake City Prospectors, Tucson Gunners, and Washington (Tri-City) Lumberjacks.

== Players and results ==
Tucson, coached by Herb Brown, went 32–16 during the regular season to finish first in the league's only season. Washington (29–19) and Reno (28–20) rounded out the top three.

In the finals, Brown's Gunners defeated Reno, which was coached by Bill Musselman, four games to three. Future Boston Celtic Gerald Henderson won the Most Valuable Player award for the playoffs.

Washington's Jeff Cook earned the Most Valuable Player award for the league. Al Smith, Walt Jordon, Cook, Del Beshore, and Willie Smith earned first-team all-league honors. Randy Ayers, Jackie Robinson, Major Jones, Brad Davis, and Jim Boylan were named to the second team.

== Standings ==
1978–1979

Team	Won	Lost	Pct.	Games Back
Tucson Gunners	32	16	.667	-
Washington Lumberjacks	29	19	.604	3
Reno Bighorns	28	20	.583	4
Fresno Stars	25	23	.521	7
Las Vegas Dealers	24	24	.500	8
Salt Lake City Prospectors	19	29	.396	13
Montana Sky	11	37	.229	21

== Championship series ==
Tucson defeated Reno 4 games to 3, winning the deciding game 104–90.

== Notable events ==
On November 10, 1979, the league had its first game with Las Vegas playing at Reno. New York Yankees manager Billy Martin was on hand for a promotional appearance. At the bar inside Reno's Centennial Coliseum, there was an altercation between Martin and Reno Reporter Ray Hagar, leaving Hagar with a black eye and chipped teeth. News of the event and photos of Hagar made the national papers the next day. Later, a $7,500 settlement was paid by Reno to Hagar for medical expenses.

On January 18, 1980, the scheduled All-Star Game in Salt Lake City was canceled, due to lack of funding.

== Proposed merger with the Continental Basketball Association ==
The league merged with the more established Continental Basketball Association, but when none of the former Western Basketball Association teams filed the required financial letter of credit, their franchises were revoked and the Continental Basketball Association continued play without adding teams.
