= 1978–79 Seattle SuperSonics season =

NBA professional basketball team season (won Championship)

- NBA champions
- Conference champions
- Division champions
- Head coach: Lenny Wilkens
- General manager: Zollie Volchok
- Owners: Sam Schulman
- Arena: Kingdome

Results
- Record: 52–30 (.634)
- Place: Division: 1st (Pacific); Conference: 1st (Western)
- Playoff finish: NBA champions (defeated Bullets 4–1)
- Stats at Basketball Reference

Local media
- Television: KIRO-TV 7 (Wayne Cody, Steve Jones)
- Radio: KIRO–AM 710 (Bob Blackburn)

The 1978–79 Seattle SuperSonics season was the team's 12th since the franchise began, and their most successful, winning their only NBA title while being based in Seattle.

In the playoffs, the SuperSonics defeated the Los Angeles Lakers in five games in the Semi-finals, then defeated the Phoenix Suns in seven games in the Conference Finals to reach the NBA Finals for a second consecutive season in a rematch of the 1978 NBA Finals, facing the defending NBA champion Washington Bullets whom they had lost to in seven games. The Sonics would go on to avenge their NBA Finals loss and defeat the Bullets in five games, winning their first and only NBA championship. Dennis Johnson was named the NBA Finals MVP.

They would not reach another NBA Finals until 1996 in which they were led by Gary Payton and Shawn Kemp. They also would not win another until 2025 as the Oklahoma City Thunder.

This was Seattle's first professional sports championship since the Seattle Metropolitans won the Stanley Cup in 1917.

== Off-season ==
=== Draft ===
Round	Pick	Player	Position	Nationality	College
2	39	James Lee	F	United States	Kentucky
2	42	Keven McDonald	F	United States	Penn
3	61	Dave Baxter	G	United States	Michigan
4	83	Billy Lewis	F	United States	Illinois State
5	105	Ralph Drollinger	C	United States	UCLA

== Roster ==
1978–79 Seattle SuperSonics roster
Players

Pos.	No.	Player	Height	Weight	DOB	From
C	21	Dennis Awtrey	6 ft 10 in (2.08 m)	235 lb (107 kg)	1948–02–22	Santa Clara
G	32	Fred Brown	6 ft 3 in (1.91 m)	182 lb (83 kg)	1948–08–07	Iowa
G	10	Joe Hassett	6 ft 5 in (1.96 m)	180 lb (82 kg)	1955–09–11	Providence
G	24	Dennis Johnson	6 ft 4 in (1.93 m)	185 lb (84 kg)	1954–09–18	Pepperdine
F	27	John Johnson	6 ft 7 in (2.01 m)	200 lb (91 kg)	1947–10–18	Iowa
F/C	23	Tom LaGarde	6 ft 10 in (2.08 m)	220 lb (100 kg)	1955–02–10	North Carolina
F	22	Jackie Robinson	6 ft 6 in (1.98 m)	210 lb (95 kg)	1955–05–20	UNLV
F	8	Lonnie Shelton	6 ft 8 in (2.03 m)	240 lb (109 kg)	1955–10–19	Oregon State
F/C	43	Jack Sikma	6 ft 11 in (2.11 m)	230 lb (104 kg)	1955–11–14	Illinois Wesleyan
F/C	35	Paul Silas	6 ft 7 in (2.01 m)	220 lb (100 kg)	1943–07–12	Creighton
G/F	11	Dick Snyder	6 ft 5 in (1.96 m)	207 lb (94 kg)	1944–02–01	Davidson
F	42	Wally Walker	6 ft 7 in (2.01 m)	190 lb (86 kg)	1954–07–18	Virginia
G	1	Gus Williams	6 ft 2 in (1.88 m)	175 lb (79 kg)	1953–10–10	USC

Coaches
Head coach
- Lenny Wilkens (Providence)

Legend
- (DP) Unsigned draft pick
- (FA) Free agent
- (S) Suspended
- Injured

Roster
Updated: 1979–06–26

== Season standings ==
Pacific Division	W	L	PCT	GB	Home	Road	Div
y-Seattle SuperSonics	52	30	.634	–	31–10	21–20	11–9
x-Phoenix Suns	50	32	.610	2	32–9	18–23	11–9
x-Los Angeles Lakers	47	35	.573	5	31–10	16–25	11–9
x-Portland Trail Blazers	45	37	.549	7	33–8	12–29	8–12
San Diego Clippers	43	39	.524	9	29–12	14–27	11–9
Golden State Warriors	38	44	.463	14	23–18	15–26	8–12

#	Western Conference				
#	Team	W	L	PCT	GB
1	z-Seattle SuperSonics	52	30	.634	–
2	y-Kansas City Kings	48	34	.585	4
3	x-Phoenix Suns	50	32	.610	2
4	x-Denver Nuggets	47	35	.573	5
5	x-Los Angeles Lakers	47	35	.573	5
6	x-Portland Trail Blazers	45	37	.549	7
7	San Diego Clippers	43	39	.524	9
8	Indiana Pacers	38	44	.463	14
9	Milwaukee Bucks	38	44	.463	14
10	Golden State Warriors	38	44	.463	14
11	Chicago Bulls	31	51	.378	21

== Game log ==
=== Regular season ===
1978–79 game log
Total: 52–30 (Home: 31–10; Road: 21–20)
October: 7–1 (home: 5–0; road: 2–1)

Game	Date	Team	Score	High points	High rebounds	High assists	Location Attendance	Record
1	October 13	Chicago	W 104–86	Dennis Johnson (26)	Jack Sikma (12)	Jack Sikma (6)	Kingdome; 15,219	1–0
2	October 15	Kansas City	W 115–105	Fred Brown (26)	Lonnie Shelton (8)	Fred Brown (5)	Kingdome; 11,609	2–0
3	October 17	@ New York	W 120–109	Tied (20)	Jack Sikma (12)	Tied (5)	Madison Square Garden; 10,155	3–0
4	October 18	@ Indiana	W 99–92	Dennis Johnson (20)	Tom LaGarde (15)	Tied (3)	Market Square Arena; 7,683	4–0
5	October 20	San Antonio	W 133–117	Tom LaGarde (32)	Tom LaGarde (13)	Tied (6)	Kingdome; 20,172	5–0
6	October 25	Washington	W 121–92	Gus Williams (24)	Lonnie Shelton (15)	Dennis Johnson (4)	Kingdome; 15,089	6–0
7	October 27	Milwaukee	W 80–79	Fred Brown (20)	Jack Sikma (13)	Fred Brown (3)	Kingdome; 19,060	7–0
8	October 29	@ San Diego	L 100–103	John Johnson (20)	Jack Sikma (11)	Tied (3)	San Diego Sports Arena; 9,469	7–1

November: 9–4 (home: 6–3; road: 3–1)

Game	Date	Team	Score	High points	High rebounds	High assists	Location Attendance	Record
9	November 2	@ Detroit	W 95–94	Jack Sikma (20)	Jack Sikma (17)	Tied (4)	Pontiac Silverdome; 7,432	8–1
10	November 3	@ New Jersey	W 102–81	Gus Williams (27)	Tom LaGarde (16)	Gus Williams (6)	Rutgers Athletic Center; 4,756	9–1
11	November 8	New York	L 100–104	Jack Sikma (22)	John Johnson (8)	Dennis Johnson (5)	Kingdome; 23,516	9–2
12	November 10	Cleveland	W 109–95	Lonnie Shelton (19)	Jack Sikma (14)	Fred Brown (9)	Kingdome; 16,384	10–2
13	November 15	New Orleans	W 135–118	Fred Brown (20)	Tom LaGarde (14)	Dennis Johnson (6)	Kingdome; 12,178	11–2
14	November 17	Indiana	W 126–115	Tied (25)	Tom LaGarde (13)	Dennis Johnson (7)	Kingdome; 14,906	12–2
15	November 18	@ Golden State	L 104–112	Gus Williams (24)	Jack Sikma (12)	Tied (5)	Oakland–Alameda County Coliseum Arena; 13,237	12–3
16	November 19	Portland	W 88–85	John Johnson (21)	Jack Sikma (13)	Dennis Johnson (8)	Kingdome; 17,809	13–3
17	November 22	Chicago	W 98–96	Gus Williams (22)	Jack Sikma (11)	John Johnson (6)	Kingdome; 13,253	14–3
18	November 24	Denver	L 100–103	Jack Sikma (23)	Jack Sikma (9)	Tied (4)	Kingdome; 25,127	14–4
19	November 25	@ Denver	W 110–104	Gus Williams (24)	Jack Sikma (16)	D. Johnson (8)	McNichols Sports Arena; 17,109	15–4
20	November 26	Houston	L 103–108	Gus Williams (23)	Jack Sikma (16)	Tied (5)	Kingdome; 18,159	15–5
21	November 29	New Jersey	W 125–111	Fred Brown (26)	Jack Sikma (16)	Gus Williams (8)	Kingdome; 13,011	16–5

December: 6–7 (home: 5–2; road: 1–5)

Game	Date	Team	Score	High points	High rebounds	High assists	Location Attendance	Record
22	December 1	@ Boston	L 80–87	Jack Sikma (19)	Jack Sikma (15)	Dennis Johnson (5)	Boston Garden; 11,198	16–6
23	December 2	@ Philadelphia	W 100–97	Jack Sikma (29)	Jack Sikma (20)	Dick Snyder (5)	The Spectrum; 15,068	17–6
24	December 8	Atlanta	W 107–106	Lonnie Shelton (26)	Jack Sikma (17)	Fred Brown (9)	Kingdome; 13,383	18–6
25	December 10	San Antonio	W 112–99	Jack Sikma (23)	Jack Sikma (19)	John Johnson (7)	Kingdome; 13,847	19–6
26	December 13	Los Angeles	W 117–107	Fred Brown (28)	Paul Silas (15)	Jack Sikma (8)	Kingdome; 20,178	20–6
27	December 15	@ Los Angeles	L 98–100	Dennis Johnson (28)	Jack Sikma (8)	Tied (7)	The Forum; 11,149	20–7
28	December 17	@ Cleveland	L 91–101	Tied (17)	Jack Sikma (21)	Fred Brown (7)	Richfield Coliseum; 8,209	20–8
29	December 19	@ Milwaukee	L 99–128	Lars Hansen (19)	Tied (8)	Paul Silas (6)	MECCA Arena; 10,938	20–9
30	December 20	@ Kansas City	L 95–114	Wally Walker (17)	Jack Sikma (11)	Tied (4)	Kemper Arena; 8,552	20–10
31	December 22	Philadelphia	L 95–103	Jack Sikma (21)	Jack Sikma (16)	Dennis Johnson (7)	Kingdome; 20,133	20–11
32	December 25	San Diego	L 118–123	Dennis Johnson (28)	Jack Sikma (14)	Jack Sikma (6)	Kingdome; 11,910	20–12
33	December 27	New Orleans	W 122–103	Fred Brown (27)	Jack Sikma (11)	Dennis Johnson (8)	Kingdome; 17,116	21–12
34	December 29	Phoenix	W 119–92	Dennis Johnson (26)	Jack Sikma (12)	Tied (7)	Kingdome; 20,565	22–12

January: 10–4 (home: 3–3; road: 7–1)

Game	Date	Team	Score	High points	High rebounds	High assists	Location Attendance	Record
35	January 1	Golden State	L 97–110	Tied (17)	Jack Sikma (11)	John Johnson (6)	Kingdome; 12,469	22–13
36	January 2	@ Portland	W 109–108	Gus Williams (25)	Jack Sikma (8)	Gus Williams (5)	Memorial Coliseum; 12,666	23–13
37	January 3	Boston	W 123–116	Jack Sikma (21)	Jack Sikma (12)	Tied (5)	Kingdome; 13,398	24–13
38	January 5	Denver	L 92–95	Jack Sikma (23)	Jack Sikma (23)	Fred Brown (5)	Kingdome; 22,347	24–14
39	January 10	Indiana	W 118–98	Jack Sikma (19)	Jack Sikma (15)	Dennis Johnson (7)	Kingdome; 14,089	25–14
40	January 11	@ Phoenix	W 109–106	Gus Williams (22)	John Johnson (10)	John Johnson (6)	Arizona Veterans Memorial Coliseum; 12,660	26–14
41	January 14	Los Angeles	L 99–108	Dennis Johnson (27)	Tied (9)	Gus Williams (6)	Kingdome; 19,756	26–15
42	January 17	@ Indiana	W 112–102	Gus Williams (26)	Jack Sikma (16)	John Johnson (6)	Market Square Arena; 9,280	27–15
43	January 20	@ Chicago	W 107–101	Dennis Johnson (29)	Tied (7)	J. Johnson (6)	[[Chicago Stadium[]] 8,945	28–15
44	January 23	@ Washington	W 103–100	Gus Williams (24)	Jack Sikma (8)	John Johnson (4)	Capital Centre; 15,232	29–15
45	January 25	@ Atlanta	W 100–98	Gus Williams (28)	Jack Sikma (15)	Dennis Johnson (10)	The Omni; 4,576	30–15
46	January 26	@ San Antonio	L 108–125	Tied (21)	Jack Sikma (18)	Tied (5)	HemisFair Arena; 13,659	30–16
47	January 27	@ Houston	W 99–94	Gus Williams (26)	Tied (10)	Fred Brown (10)	The Summit; 15,153	31–16
48	January 31	Portland	W 115–112	Gus Williams (23)	Jack Sikma (15)	Jack Sikma (5)	Kingdome; 19,540	32–16

February: 6–9 (home: 5–1; road: 1–8)

Game	Date	Team	Score	High points	High rebounds	High assists	Location Attendance	Record
49	February 1	New Jersey	W 107–102	Jack Sikma (30)	Tied (10)	Fred Brown (6)	Kingdome; 17,332	33–16
50	February 2	Milwaukee	W 104–102	Jack Sikma (22)	Jack Sikma (17)	Gus Williams (6)	Kingdome; 24,332	34–16
All-Star Game
51	February 6	@ New York	L 99–108	Gus Williams (26)	Jack Sikma (10)	Gus Williams (8)	Madison Square Garden; 12,952	34–17
52	February 7	@ Boston	L 100–107	GUs Williams (28)	Jack Sikma (12)	Gus Williams (5)	Boston Garden; 6,902	34–18
53	February 9	@ Milwaukee	L 116–118 (OT)	Gus Williams (26)	Jack Sikma (9)	Tied (6)	MECCA Arena; 10,938	34–19
54	February 10	@ Houston	L 101–113	Jack Sikma (27)	Jack Sikma (12)	Gus Williams (8)	The Summit; 15,676	34–20
55	February 14	Atlanta	W 116–104	Tied (22)	Tied (9)	Gus Williams (7)	Kingdome; 15,223	35–20
56	February 16	Phoenix	W 119–104	Dennis Johnson (30)	Jack Sikma (15)	Fred Brown (7)	Kingdome; 23,103	36–20
57	February 18	Washington	L 94–105	Gus Williams (22)	Paul Silas (16)	Tied (5)	Kingdome; 21,935	36–21
58	February 20	@ San Antonio	L 102–118	Jack Sikma (20)	Jack Sikma (11)	Tied (4)	HemisFair Arena; 11,765	36–22
59	February 21	@ New Orleans	W 96–94	Gus Williams (20)	Jack Sikma (19)	Fred Brown (6)	Louisiana Superdome; 6,327	37–22
60	February 23	@ Washington	L 110–132	Paul Silas (16)	Jack Sikma (11)	Tied (3)	Capital Centre; 19,035	37–23
61	February 25	@ Kansas City	L 106–114	Gus Williams (33)	Paul Silas (12)	Gus Williams (6)	Kemper Arena; 14,059	37–24
62	February 27	@ Denver	L 106–121	Tied (20)	Tied (9)	D. Johnson (7)	McNichols Sports Arena; 14,182	37–25
63	February 28	Philadelphia	W 97–93	Gus Williams (28)	Jack Sikma (13)	John Johnson (6)	Kingdome; 18,900	38–25

March: 11–3 (home: 6–1; road: 5–2)

Game	Date	Team	Score	High points	High rebounds	High assists	Location Attendance	Record
64	March 2	Cleveland	L 109–111	Gus Williams (31)	Jack Sikma (22)	Jack Sikma (5)	Kingdome; 21,337	38–26
65	March 4	Houston	W 119–109	Lonnie Shelton (28)	Jack Sikma (11)	John Johnson (9)	Kingdome; 21,219	39–26
66	March 7	@ Detroit	W 99–93	Fred Brown (27)	Jack Sikma (19)	Gus Williams (7)	Pontiac Silverdome; 7,069	40–26
67	March 9	@ New Jersey	W 108–100	Gus Williams (38)	Jack Sikma (16)	Gus Williams (6)	Rutgers Athletic Center; 6,235	41–26
68	March 11	@ Atlanta	L 111–113 (OT)	Gus Williams (32)	Jack Sikma (18)	Gus Williams (8)	The Omni; 10,533	41–27
69	March 14	@ Philadelphia	W 99–96	Gus Williams (23)	Jack Sikma (13)	Tied (6)	The Spectrum; 11,645	42–27
70	March 15	@ Cleveland	W 104–98	Lonnie Shelton (28)	Jack Sikma (16)	John Johnson (7)	Richfield Coliseum; 7,122	43–27
71	March 17	@ Chicago	W 106–88	Gus Williams (27)	Paul Silas (9)	John Johnson (8)	Chicago Stadium; 8,974	44–27
72	March 22	Boston	W 112–110	Jack Sikma (24)	Jack Sikma (15)	John Johnson (8)	Kingdome; 21,549	45–27
73	March 25	Kansas City	W 111–101	Gus Williams (38)	Tied (10)	John Williams (8)	Kingdome; 21,497	46–27
74	March 27	San Diego	W 115–109	Gus Williams (30)	Lonnie Shelton (12)	John Johnson (13)	Kingdome; 20,087	47–27
75	March 28	New York	W 111–105	Dennis Johnson (25)	Jack Sikma (9)	John Johnson (8)	Kingdome; 20,075	48–27
76	March 30	@ Phoenix	L 111–113 (OT)	Fred Brown (20)	Lonnie Shelton (8)	John Johnson (6)	Arizona Veterans Memorial Coliseum; 12,660	48–28
77	March 31	Detroit	W 123–102	Tied (18)	Jack Sikma (14)	Tied (6)	Kingdome; 21,639	49–28

April: 3–2 (home: 1–0; road: 2–2)

Game	Date	Team	Score	High points	High rebounds	High assists	Location Attendance	Record
78	April 1	Golden State	W 102–97	Dennis Johnson (24)	Jack Sikma (11)	Tied (7)	Kingdome; 24,802	50–28
79	April 3	@ Portland	L 102–106	Gus Williams (28)	Jack Sikma (12)	Gus Williams (8)	Memorial Coliseum; 12,666	50–29
80	April 4	@ San Diego	W 115–107	Gus Williams (26)	Jack Sikma (20)	John Johnson (5)	San Diego Sports Arena; 10,874	51–29
81	April 6	@ Los Angeles	W 113–93	Gus Williams (31)	Jack Sikma (12)	Gus Williams (10)	The Forum; 14,343	52–29
82	April 8	@ Golden State	L 86–89	Tied (16)	Jack Sikma (7)	Gus Williams (5)	Oakland–Alameda County Coliseum Arena; 8,972	52–30

1978–79 schedule

=== Playoffs ===
The SuperSonics had a first round bye, then defeated the Los Angeles Lakers in the Western Conference Semi-finals, the Phoenix Suns in the Western Conference Finals, and the Washington Bullets in the NBA Finals. Dennis Johnson of the SuperSonics was the Most Valuable Player of the Finals while teammate Gus Williams was the leading scorer, averaging 28.6 points per game.

1979 playoff game log
Conference Semifinals: 4–1 (home: 3–0; road: 1–1)

Game	Date	Team	Score	High points	High rebounds	High assists	Location Attendance	Series
1	April 17	Los Angeles	W 112–101	Dennis Johnson (26)	Lonnie Shelton (12)	John Johnson (9)	Kingdome; 26,377	1–0
2	April 18	Los Angeles	W 108–103 (OT)	Gus Williams (38)	Jack Sikma (10)	Jack Sikma (8)	Kingdome; 26,862	2–0
3	April 20	@ Los Angeles	L 112–118 (OT)	Gus Williams (29)	Paul Silas (13)	Paul Silas (4)	The Forum; 17,505	2–1
4	April 22	@ Los Angeles	W 117–115	Gus Williams (30)	Tied (11)	Dennis Johnson (7)	The Forum; 17,505	3–1
5	April 25	Los Angeles	W 106–100	Gus Williams (30)	Jack Sikma (10)	Jack Sikma (6)	Seattle Center Coliseum; 14,098	4–1

Conference Finals: 4–3 (home: 3–1; road: 1–2)

Game	Date	Team	Score	High points	High rebounds	High assists	Location Attendance	Series
1	May 1	Phoenix	W 108–93	Gus Williams (27)	Jack Sikma (10)	John Johnson (9)	Seattle Center Coliseum; 14,098	1–0
2	May 4	Phoenix	W 103–97	John Johnson (21)	Lonnie Shelton (15)	Gus Williams (6)	Kingdome; 31,964	2–0
3	May 6	@ Phoenix	L 103–113	Gus Williams (22)	Tied (9)	Gus Williams (6)	Arizona Veterans Memorial Coliseum; 12,660	2–1
4	May 8	@ Phoenix	L 91–100	Gus Williams (22)	Lonnie Shelton (10)	Tied (3)	Arizona Veterans Memorial Coliseum; 12,660	2–2
5	May 11	Phoenix	L 93–99	Dennis Johnson (24)	Jack Sikma (12)	John Johnson (5)	Kingdome; 28,935	2–3
6	May 13	@ Phoenix	W 106–105	Dennis Johnson (23)	Jack Sikma (10)	Dennis Johnson (6)	Arizona Veterans Memorial Coliseum; 12,660	3–3
7	May 17	Phoenix	W 114–110	Jack Sikma (33)	Jack Sikma (11)	Fred Brown (5)	Kingdome; 37,552	4–3

NBA Finals: 4–1 (home: 2–0; road: 2–1)

Game	Date	Team	Score	High points	High rebounds	High assists	Location Attendance	Series
1	May 20	@ Washington	L 97–99	Gus Williams (32)	John Johnson (11)	Dennis Johnson (7)	Capital Centre; 19,035	0–1
2	May 24	@ Washington	W 92–82	Gus Williams (23)	Jack Sikma (13)	Tied (6)	Capital Centre; 19,035	1–1
3	May 27	Washington	W 105–95	Gus Williams (31)	Jack Sikma (17)	Dennis Johnson (9)	Kingdome; 35,928	2–1
4	May 29	Washington	W 114–112 (OT)	Gus Williams (36)	Jack Sikma (17)	John Johnson (13)	Seattle Center Coliseum; 14,098	3–1
5	June 1	@ Washington	W 97–93	Gus Williams (23)	Jack Sikma (17)	John Johnson (6)	Capital Centre; 19,035	4–1

1979 schedule

== Awards and records ==
- Dennis Johnson, NBA All-Defensive First Team
- Dennis Johnson, NBA Finals Most Valuable Player

== 1979 NBA All-Star Game ==
- Dennis Johnson
- Jack Sikma
