= List of Seattle SuperSonics seasons =

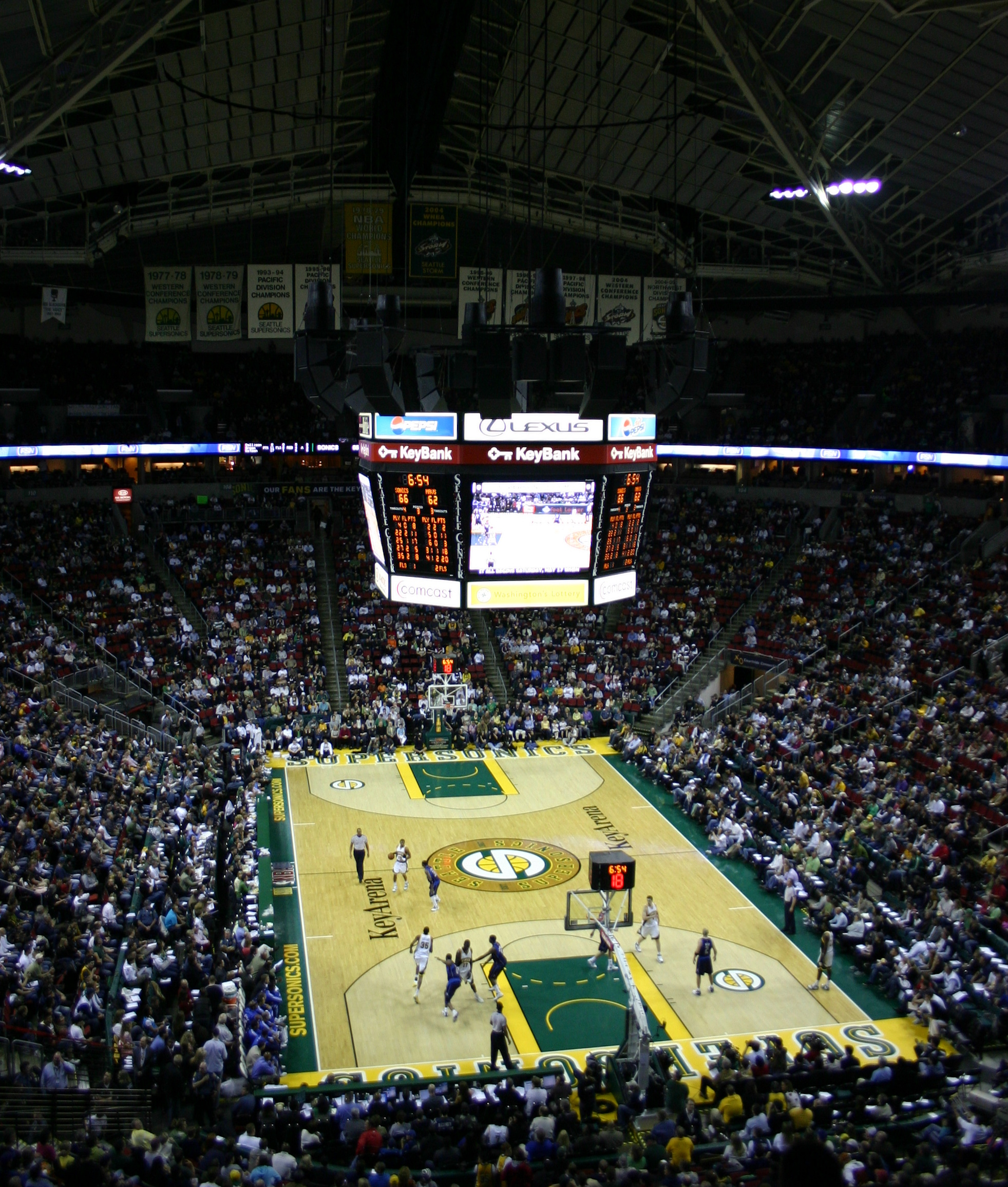
The final Seattle SuperSonics game at KeyArena during the 2007–08 season

The Seattle SuperSonics, also known as the Sonics, were a professional basketball team based in Seattle. The team played from 1967 to 2008. They were members of the Western Conference of the National Basketball Association (NBA) from 1970 onward; the team played in the conference's Pacific Division from 1970 to 2004 and the Northwest Division from 2004 to 2008. (Note: The Western Conference was established in 1970; prior to that, the Sonics played in the Western Division.) The Sonics joined the NBA as an expansion team in 1967 and were named for the supersonic airliner under development by Boeing, which was later cancelled. They played for their first eleven seasons at the Seattle Center Coliseum, which was built for the 1962 World's Fair and had a seating capacity of 12,595. The team moved in 1978 to the Kingdome, a multipurpose stadium shared with other sports teams, and set NBA attendance records there during a seven-season stay. The Sonics hosted twenty Kingdome games with crowds larger than 30,000 and drew a league-record 40,172 spectators at a 1980 playoffs game.

The team returned to the Seattle Center Coliseum in 1985 as attendance at the Kingdome declined and the stadium's scheduling and layout caused issues for fans. A major renovation of the Coliseum began in 1994 and displaced the Sonics, who played for two seasons at the Tacoma Dome, a suburban arena that was expanded to 16,296 seats. The renovated Coliseum, renamed to KeyArena, had the NBA's smallest seating capacity at 17,072 and hosted its first regular season game on November 4, 1995. The team played their final home game at KeyArena on April 13, 2008. After the end of the 2007–08 season, the Sonics were relocated by its new ownership group to Oklahoma City. A lawsuit to halt the relocation and enforce the team's 15-year lease at KeyArena was filed by the Seattle city government but dropped as part of a settlement in July 2008. The team has played since the 2008–09 season as the Oklahoma City Thunder; as part of the settlement, the SuperSonics name and history was left with the city for use by a future team.

In their 41 seasons as an NBA team, the SuperSonics had an all-time regular season record of 1,745 wins and 1,585 losses; in the playoffs, they had 107 wins and 110 losses. They reached the postseason 22 times and played in three NBA Finals, winning one league championship in 1979. The Sonics were the first team from Washington state to win a major professional sports championship since the Seattle Metropolitans in the 1917 Stanley Cup. Their .524 winning percentage was also historically the best among professional teams in the Seattle area, surpassing the Seattle Seahawks and Seattle Mariners. The team's all-time points leader is Gary Payton with 18,207 points; he also holds the most assists in Sonics history at 7,384.

The Sonics had a 23–59 record during their inaugural season and finished with the NBA's second-worst record, narrowly ahead of fellow expansion team San Diego Rockets. The team were below .500 for their first four seasons and had their first winning season in 1971–72, where they earned a 47–35 record. The Sonics clinched their first playoff berth in the 1974–75 season, which was followed by consecutive NBA Finals in 1978 and 1979 against the Washington Bullets. Seattle lost the first final, but defeated Washington in the rematch after finishing first in the Western Conference. Lenny Wilkens, who led the team to both finals appearances, was replaced as head coach in 1985 after missing the playoffs by finishing with a 31–51 record, which his successor Bernie Bickerstaff equaled the following season. The Sonics made an unexpected run to the Western Conference final in the 1987 playoffs, only to lose to the Los Angeles Lakers.

The 1990s brought more consistent success, including eight consecutive playoff appearances, with head coach George Karl and new players Shawn Kemp and Gary Payton, both acquired in the draft. The Sonics finished as the top seed in the 1993–94 season with a 63–19 record, but lost in a major upset to the eighth-seeded Denver Nuggets in the opening round of the playoffs. The team reached the 1996 NBA Finals—their third and final appearance—after clinching first in the Western Conference standings but lost to the Chicago Bulls in six games. The Sonics were eliminated in the conference semifinals two more times under Karl before he left the team along with Kemp by 1998. The team, now under coach Paul Westphal, missed the playoffs in the shortened 1998–99 season, but returned the following year as a seventh-seed. Westphal was replaced early in the 2000–01 season by assistant coach and former Sonics player Nate McMillan, who led the team through rebuilds and to their two final playoff appearances: in 2002–03 and 2004–05 as the Northwest Division champions with 52 wins. The team's final three seasons in Seattle all finished with losing records and no playoff berths under the three different head coaches. The Sonics had 20 wins and 62 losses during their 2007–08 season, their worst record in franchise history, shortly before moving to Oklahoma City.

== Table key ==
Key to colors

†	NBA champions
*	Conference champions
^	Division champions
¤	Playoff berth

Key to abbreviations

- Finish – Final position in league or division standings
- W – Number of regular season wins
- L – Number of regular season losses
- GB – Games behind first-place team in division (Note: The formula is as follows: $\mathrm{Games}\ \mathrm{behind} = \frac{(\mathrm{Team A's}\ \mathrm{wins}-\mathrm{Team B's}\ \mathrm{wins}) + (\mathrm{Team B's}\ \mathrm{losses} - \mathrm{Team A's}\ \mathrm{losses})}{\mathrm{2}}$)

Key to awards

- AMVP – All-Star Game Most Valuable Player
- COY – Coach of the Year
- CPOY – Comeback Player of the Year
- DPOY – Defensive Player of the Year
- EOY – Executive of the Year
- FMVP – Finals Most Valuable Player
- JWKC – J. Walter Kennedy Citizenship
- MIP – Most Improved Player
- ROY – Rookie of the Year
- SMOY – Sixth Man of the Year
- SPOR – Sportsmanship Award

== Seasons ==
Seattle SuperSonics record by season, 1967–2008
Year	Season	Conference	Fin.	Division	Fin.	Regular season				Playoff results	Awards	Head coach	Ref.
Year	Season	Conference	Fin.	Division	Fin.	W	L	Pct.	GB	Playoff results	Awards	Head coach	Ref.
1967–68	1967–68	—	—	Western	5th	23	59	.280	33	Did not qualify	—	Al Bianchi	
1968–69	1968–69	—	—	Western	6th	30	52	.366	25	Did not qualify	—	Al Bianchi	
1969–70	1969–70	—	—	Western	5th	36	46	.439	12	Did not qualify	—	Lenny Wilkens (Note: Lenny Wilkens was a player–coach for the SuperSonics from 1969 to 1972 and later returned solely as head coach in 1977.)	
1970–71	1970–71	Western	8th	Pacific	4th	38	44	.463	10	Did not qualify	Lenny Wilkens (AMVP)	Lenny Wilkens	
1971–72	1971–72	Western	6th	Pacific	3rd	47	35	.573	22	Did not qualify	—	Lenny Wilkens	
1972–73	1972–73	Western	8th	Pacific	4th	26	56	.317	34	Did not qualify	—	Tom Nissalke (13–32) Bucky Buckwalter (13–24)	
1973–74	1973–74	Western	6th	Pacific	3rd	36	46	.439	11	Did not qualify	—	Bill Russell	
1974–75	1974–75	Western	4th ¤	Pacific	2nd	43	39	.524	5	Won first round vs. Detroit, 2–1; Lost conference semifinals vs. Golden State, 2–4	—	Bill Russell	
1975–76	1975–76	Western	2nd ¤	Pacific	2nd	43	39	.524	16	Lost conference semifinals vs. Phoenix, 2–4	Slick Watts (JWKC)	Bill Russell	
1976–77	1976–77	Western	8th	Pacific	4th	40	42	.488	13	Did not qualify	—	Bill Russell	
1977–78	1977–78 *	Western *	4th ¤	Pacific	3rd	47	35	.514	11	Won first round vs. LA Lakers, 2–1; Won conference semifinals vs. Portland, 4–2; Won conference finals vs. Denver, 4–2; Lost NBA Finals vs. Washington, 3–4 *	—	Bob Hopkins (5–17) Lenny Wilkens (42–18)	
1978–79	1978–79 †	Western *	1st ¤	Pacific	1st ^	52	30	.634	—	Won conference semifinals vs. LA Lakers, 4–1; Won conference finals vs. Phoenix, 4–3; Won NBA Finals vs. Washington, 4–1 †	Dennis Johnson (FMVP)	Lenny Wilkens	
1979–80	1979–80	Western	2nd ¤	Pacific	2nd	56	26	.683	4	Won first round vs. Portland, 2–1; Won conference semifinals vs. Milwaukee, 4–3; Lost conference finals vs. LA Lakers, 1–4	—	Lenny Wilkens	
1980–81	1980–81	Western	10th	Pacific	6th	34	48	.415	23	Did not qualify	—	Lenny Wilkens	
1981–82	1981–82	Western	2nd ¤	Pacific	2nd	52	30	.634	5	Won first round vs. Houston, 2–1; Lost conference semifinals vs. San Antonio, 1–4	Gus Williams (CPOY)	Lenny Wilkens	
1982–83	1982–83	Western	4th ¤	Pacific	3rd	48	34	.585	10	Lost first round vs. Portland, 0–2	Zollie Volchok (EOY)	Lenny Wilkens	
1983–84	1983–84	Western	5th ¤	Pacific	3rd	42	40	.512	12	Lost first round vs. Dallas, 2–3	—	Lenny Wilkens	
1984–85	1984–85	Western	10th	Pacific	4th (Note: The Seattle SuperSonics and Los Angeles Clippers finished with identical 31–51 records, but Seattle won the tiebreaker to finish fourth.)	31	51	.378	31	Did not qualify	—	Lenny Wilkens	
1985–86	1985–86	Western	11th	Pacific	5th	31	51	.378	31	Did not qualify	—	Bernie Bickerstaff	
1986–87	1986–87	Western	7th ¤	Pacific	4th	39	43	.476	26	Won first round vs. Dallas, 3–1; Won conference semifinals vs. Houston, 4–2; Lost conference finals vs. LA Lakers, 0–4	Tom Chambers (AMVP) Dale Ellis (MIP)	Bernie Bickerstaff	
1987–88	1987–88	Western	7th ¤	Pacific	3rd	44	38	.537	18	Lost first round vs. Denver, 2–3	—	Bernie Bickerstaff	
1988–89	1988–89	Western	4th ¤	Pacific	3rd	47	35	.573	10	Won first round vs. Houston, 3–1; Lost conference semifinals vs. LA Lakers, 0–4	—	Bernie Bickerstaff	
1989–90	1989–90	Western	9th	Pacific	4th	41	41	.500	22	Did not qualify	—	Bernie Bickerstaff	
1990–91	1990–91	Western	8th ¤	Pacific	5th	41	41	.500	22	Lost first round vs. Portland, 2–3	—	K. C. Jones	
1991–92	1991–92	Western	6th ¤	Pacific	4th	47	35	.573	10	Won first round vs. Golden State, 3–1; Lost conference semifinals vs. Utah, 1–4	—	K. C. Jones (18–18) Bob Kloppenburg (2–2) George Karl (27–15)	
1992–93	1992–93	Western	3rd ¤	Pacific	2nd	55	27	.671	7	Won first round vs. Utah, 3–2; Won conference semifinals vs. Houston, 3–4; Lost conference finals vs. Phoenix, 3–4	—	George Karl	
1993–94	1993–94	Western	1st ¤	Pacific	1st ^	63	19	.768	—	Lost first round vs. Denver, 2–3	Bob Whitsitt (EOY)	George Karl	
1994–95	1994–95	Western	4th ¤	Pacific	2nd	57	25	.695	2	Lost first round vs. LA Lakers, 1–3	—	George Karl	
1995–96	1995–96 *	Western *	1st ¤	Pacific	1st ^	64	18	.780	—	Won first round vs. Sacramento, 3–1; Won conference semifinals vs. Rockets, 4–0; Won conference finals vs. Utah, 4–3; Lost NBA Finals vs. Chicago, 2–4 *	Gary Payton (DPOY)	George Karl	
1996–97	1996–97	Western	3rd ¤	Pacific	1st ^	57	25	.695	—	Won first round vs. Phoenix, 3–2; Lost conference semifinals vs. Houston, 3–4	—	George Karl	
1997–98	1997–98	Western	2nd ¤	Pacific	1st ^ (Note: The Seattle SuperSonics and Los Angeles Lakers finished with identical 61–21 records, but Seattle won the head-to-head tiebreaker to place first in the Pacific Division.)	61	21	.744	—	Won first round vs. Minnesota, 3–2; Lost conference semifinals vs. LA Lakers, 1–4	—	George Karl	
1998–99 (Note: The 1998–99 season was shortened to 50 games due to a player lockout that lasted until January 1999.)	1998–99	Western	9th	Pacific	5th	25	25	.500	10	Did not qualify	Hersey Hawkins (SPOR)	Paul Westphal	
1999–2000	1999–2000	Western	7th ¤	Pacific	4th	45	37	.549	22	Lost first round vs. Utah, 2–3	—	Paul Westphal	
2000–01	2000–01	Western	10th	Pacific	5th	44	38	.537	12	Did not qualify	—	Paul Westphal (6–9) Nate McMillan (38–29)	
2001–02	2001–02	Western	7th ¤	Pacific	4th	45	37	.549	16	Lost first round vs. San Antonio, 2–3	—	Nate McMillan	
2002–03	2002–03	Western	10th	Pacific	5th	40	42	.488	19	Did not qualify	Ray Allen (SPOR)	Nate McMillan	
2003–04	2003–04	Western	12th	Pacific	5th (Note: The Seattle SuperSonics and Golden State Warriors finished with identical 37–45 records, but Seattle lost the tiebreaker to finish fifth.)	37	45	.451	19	Did not qualify	—	Nate McMillan	
2004–05	2004–05	Western	4th ¤	Northwest	1st ^	52	30	.634	—	Won first round vs. Sacramento, 4–1; Lost conference semifinals vs. San Antonio, 2–4	—	Nate McMillan	
2005–06	2005–06	Western	11th	Northwest	3rd	35	47	.427	9	Did not qualify	—	Bill Weiss (13–17) Bob Hill (22–30)	
2006–07	2006–07	Western	14th	Northwest	5th	31	51	.378	20	Did not qualify	—	Bob Hill	
2007–08	2007–08	Western	15th	Northwest	5th	20	62	.244	34	Did not qualify	Kevin Durant (ROY)	P. J. Carlesimo	
Relocated to Oklahoma City
Totals (41 seasons)						1,745	1,585	.524	All-time regular season record (1967–2008)				
Totals (41 seasons)						107	110	.493	All-time playoffs record (1967–2008)				
Totals (41 seasons)						1,852	1,695	.522	All-time overall record (1967–2008)				

== See also ==
- List of Oklahoma City Thunder seasons
