= Tom Barker (basketball) =

American basketball player (born 1955)

Personal information
- Born: March 11, 1955 (age 71) Harlingen, Texas, U.S.
- Listed height: 6 ft 10 in (2.08 m)
- Listed weight: 225 lb (102 kg)

Career information
- High school: Weslaco (Weslaco, Texas)
- College: Minnesota (1972–1973); College of Southern Idaho (1973–1974); Hawaii (1974–1976)
- NBA draft: 1976: 4th round, 53rd overall pick
- Drafted by: Atlanta Hawks
- Playing career: 1976–1985
- Position: Center / power forward
- Number: 41, 15, 35, 6

Career history
- 1976–1977: Atlanta Hawks
- 1977–1978: Jersey Shore Bullets
- 1978: Houston Rockets
- 1979: Boston Celtics
- 1979: New York Knicks
- 1979–1980: Basket Mestre
- 1980–1983: Nashua Den Bosch

Career highlights
- All-EBA Second Team (1978)
- Stats at NBA.com
- Stats at Basketball Reference

Thomas Kevin Barker (born March 11, 1955) is an American former professional basketball player. He played college basketball for the Minnesota Golden Gophers, College of Southern Idaho Golden Eagles and the Hawaii Rainbow Warriors. Barker was selected by the Atlanta Hawks as the 53rd overall pick in the 1976 NBA draft. He played for the Hawks, Houston Rockets, Boston Celtics, New York Knicks in the National Basketball Association (NBA). Barker played in the Eastern Basketball Association (EBA) for the Jersey Shore Bullets from 1977 to 1978 and was named to the All-EBA Second Team.

== Career statistics ==
Legend
GP	Games played	GS	Games started	MPG	Minutes per game
FG%	Field goal percentage	3P%	3-point field goal percentage	FT%	Free throw percentage
RPG	Rebounds per game	APG	Assists per game	SPG	Steals per game
BPG	Blocks per game	PPG	Points per game	**Bold**	Career high

=== NBA ===
==== Regular season ====
Year	Team	GP	MPG	FG%	FT%	RPG	APG	SPG	BPG	PPG
1976–77	Atlanta	**59**	**22.9**	.417	.683	**6.8**	**1.0**	**.6**	**.7**	**8.1**
1978–79	Houston	5	3.2	**.500**	**1.000**	1.2	.0	.0	.0	1.6
1978–79	Boston	12	10.9	.438	.733	2.5	.5	.3	.3	4.4
1978–79	New York	22	15.0	.431	.700	3.8	.4	.3	.3	4.6
Career		98	18.7	.422	.692	5.3	.8	.4	.5	6.5
