= Frankie Sanders =

American basketball player

Personal information
- Born: January 23, 1957 (age 69) Dayton, Ohio, U.S.
- Listed height: 6 ft 6 in (1.98 m)
- Listed weight: 200 lb (91 kg)

Career information
- High school: Stivers (Dayton, Ohio)
- College: Southern (1975–1978)
- NBA draft: 1978: 1st round, 20th overall pick
- Drafted by: San Antonio Spurs
- Playing career: 1978–1987
- Position: Small forward
- Number: 45, 4

Career history
- 1978: San Antonio Spurs
- 1979: Boston Celtics
- 1981: Kansas City Kings
- 1982–1984: Albany Patroons
- 1984–1985: Albuquerque Silvers
- 1985–1986: ABC Nantes
- 1986: Gold Coast Stingrays
- 1987: Jersey Jammers
- 1987: Rhode Island Gulls

Career highlights
- CBA champion (1984)
- Stats at NBA.com
- Stats at Basketball Reference

Frankie J. Sanders (born January 23, 1957) is an American former professional basketball player. After a standout collegiate career at Southern University, in which Sanders averaged 26 points and 10 rebounds per game and scored over 2,000 points in his three-year career, he was selected in the 1978 NBA draft by the San Antonio Spurs as the 20th overall pick.

Sanders' NBA career was shortened by self-admitted irresponsible behavior, such as drug use, drinking, and partying too much. He played for three different teams in two seasons despite being a first round draft selection. Over the course of his professional career, he played in the Continental Basketball Association (CBA), United States Basketball League (USBL), and overseas in France, Spain, and Venezuela. Sanders won the CBA championship in 1983–84 while playing for the Albany Patroons.

== Career statistics ==
Legend
GP	Games played	GS	Games started	MPG	Minutes per game
FG%	Field goal percentage	3P%	3-point field goal percentage	FT%	Free throw percentage
RPG	Rebounds per game	APG	Assists per game	SPG	Steals per game
BPG	Blocks per game	PPG	Points per game	**Bold**	Career high

=== NBA ===
==== Regular season ====
Year	Team	GP	MPG	FG%	3P%	FT%	RPG	APG	SPG	BPG	PPG
1978–79	San Antonio	22	**12.0**	.394		.780	**2.7**	**1.6**	.6	**.1**	**6.0**
1978–79	Boston	**24**	9.0	**.462**		.815	2.1	.7	.3	**.1**	5.5
1980–81	Kansas City	23	8.1	.442	–	**.909**	.9	.7	**.7**	.0	3.8
Career		69	9.6	.430	–	.822	1.9	1.0	.5	.1	5.1

==== Playoffs ====
Year	Team	GP	MPG	FG%	3P%	FT%	RPG	APG	SPG	BPG	PPG
1981	Kansas City	9	5.6	.500	.500	1.000	.6	.2	.3	.0	2.6
