= Marlon Redmond =

American basketball player

Personal information
- Born: April 15, 1955 (age 71) San Francisco, California, U.S.
- Listed height: 6 ft 6 in (1.98 m)
- Listed weight: 188 lb (85 kg)

Career information
- High school: Balboa (San Francisco, California)
- College: San Francisco (1973–1977)
- NBA draft: 1977: 3rd round, 60th overall pick
- Drafted by: Golden State Warriors
- Playing career: 1978–1982
- Position: Shooting guard
- Number: 23, 4

Career history
- 1978–1979: Kansas City Kings
- 1979: Philadelphia 76ers
- 1979: Kansas City Kings
- 1980–1982: Billings Volcanos

Career highlights
- All-CBA Second Team (1982); First-team All-WCC (1975); 2× Second-team All-WCC (1976, 1977)
- Stats at NBA.com
- Stats at Basketball Reference

Marlon Bernard Redmond (born April 15, 1955, in San Francisco, California) is an American former professional basketball shooting guard who played two seasons in the National Basketball Association (NBA) as a member of the Philadelphia 76ers (1978–79) and the Kansas City Kings (1978–80). He was drafted by the Golden State Warriors from the University of San Francisco during the third round of the 1977 NBA draft.

Redmond played for the Billings Volcanos of the Continental Basketball Association (CBA) from 1980 to 1982 and was selected to the All-CBA Second Team in 1982.

== Career statistics ==
Legend
GP	Games played	GS	Games started	MPG	Minutes per game
FG%	Field goal percentage	3P%	3-point field goal percentage	FT%	Free throw percentage
RPG	Rebounds per game	APG	Assists per game	SPG	Steals per game
BPG	Blocks per game	PPG	Points per game	**Bold**	Career high

=== NBA ===
==== Regular season ====
Year	Team	GP	GS	MPG	FG%	3P%	FT%	RPG	APG	SPG	BPG	PPG
1978–79	Kansas City	**49**		**15.0**	**.432**		.620	**2.2**	**1.2**	**.6**	.3	**7.2**
1978–79	Philadelphia	4	0	5.8	.083		–	.3	.3	.0	.0	.5
1979–80	Kansas City	24		12.4	.428	.000	**.706**	**2.2**	.8	.2	**.4**	5.9
Career		77	0	13.7	.423	.000	.655	2.1	1.0	.4	.3	6.5

==== Playoffs ====
Year	Team	GP	MPG	FG%	FT%	RPG	APG	SPG	BPG	PPG
1979	Philadelphia	1	2.0	.000	–	.0	.0	.0	.0	.0
