= Alonzo Bradley =

American basketball player (born 1953)

Personal information
- Born: October 16, 1953 (age 73) Utica, Mississippi, U.S.
- Listed height: 6 ft 6 in (1.98 m)
- Listed weight: 190 lb (86 kg)

Career information
- High school: Hinds County Agricultural (Utica, Mississippi)
- College: Hinds CC (1973–1975); Texas Southern (1975–1977)
- NBA draft: 1977: 2nd round, 29th overall pick
- Drafted by: Indiana Pacers
- Playing career: 1977–1980
- Position: Small forward
- Number: 30, 22

Career history
- 1977–1980: Houston Rockets

Career highlights
- NAIA tournament MVP (1977)
- Stats at NBA.com
- Stats at Basketball Reference

Alonzo Bradley (born October 16, 1953) is a retired American basketball player. Born in Utica, Mississippi, he played collegiately for Texas Southern University.

He was selected by the Indiana Pacers in the second round (29th pick overall) of the 1977 NBA draft. He played for the Houston Rockets (from 1977 to 1980) in the National Basketball Association (NBA) for 99 games. He was picked by the Dallas Mavericks in the Expansion Draft.

== Career statistics ==
Legend
GP	Games played	GS	Games started	MPG	Minutes per game
FG%	Field goal percentage	3P%	3-point field goal percentage	FT%	Free throw percentage
RPG	Rebounds per game	APG	Assists per game	SPG	Steals per game
BPG	Blocks per game	PPG	Points per game	**Bold**	Career high

=== NBA ===
==== Regular season ====
Year	Team	GP	MPG	FG%	3P%	FT%	RPG	APG	SPG	BPG	PPG
1977–78	Houston	**43**	**18.6**	**.428**		**.729**	**2.3**	**1.3**	**.4**	**.1**	**7.0**
1978–79	Houston	34	7.2	.420		.667	1.4	.5	.1	.0	2.8
1979–80	Houston	22	4.4	.354	1.000	.667	.3	.1	.1	.0	1.9
Career		99	11.5	.418	1.000	.703	1.5	.7	.2	.1	4.4

==== Playoffs ====
Year	Team	GP	MPG	FG%	3P%	FT%	RPG	APG	SPG	BPG	PPG
1979	Houston	1	1.0	–		–	.0	.0	.0	.0	.0
1980	Houston	**4**	**3.8**	**.667**	1.000	**.600**	**.8**	**.3**	**.3**	.0	**4.0**
Career		5	3.2	.667	1.000	.600	.6	.2	.2	.0	3.2
