= Greg Bunch =

American basketball player (born 1956)

Personal information
- Born: May 15, 1956 (age 70) San Bernardino, California, U.S.
- Listed height: 6 ft 6 in (1.98 m)
- Listed weight: 190 lb (86 kg)

Career information
- High school: Pacific (San Bernardino, California)
- College: Cal State Fullerton (1974–1978)
- NBA draft: 1978: 2nd round, 34th overall pick
- Drafted by: New York Knicks
- Playing career: 1978–1984
- Position: Small forward
- Number: 30

Career history
- 1978: New York Knicks
- 1978–1979: Las Vegas Dealers
- 1981–1983: Caixa Manresa
- 1983–1984: L'Hospitalet

Career highlights
- PCAA Player of the Year (1976); 3× First-team All-PCAA (1976–1978); No. 30 retired by Cal State Fullerton Titans
- Stats at NBA.com
- Stats at Basketball Reference

Greg Darnell Bunch (born May 15, 1956) is an American former professional basketball player. He was a 6'6" 190 lb forward.

He played collegiately for the California State University, Fullerton.

He was selected by the New York Knicks in the 2nd round (34th pick overall) of the 1978 NBA draft. He played for the Knicks during the 1978-79 NBA season for 12 games.

== Career statistics ==
Legend
GP	Games played	GS	Games started	MPG	Minutes per game
FG%	Field goal percentage	3P%	3-point field goal percentage	FT%	Free throw percentage
RPG	Rebounds per game	APG	Assists per game	SPG	Steals per game
BPG	Blocks per game	PPG	Points per game	**Bold**	Career high

=== NBA ===
==== Regular season ====
Year	Team	GP	MPG	FG%	FT%	RPG	APG	SPG	BPG	PPG
1978–79	New York	12	8.1	.346	.833	1.4	.3	.3	.3	2.3
