= Armond Hill =

American basketball player and coach (born 1953)

Personal information
- Born: March 31, 1953 (age 73) Brooklyn, New York, U.S.
- Listed height: 6 ft 4 in (1.93 m)
- Listed weight: 190 lb (86 kg)

Career information
- High school: Bishop Ford (Brooklyn, New York)
- College: Princeton (1973–1976)
- NBA draft: 1976: 1st round, 9th overall pick
- Drafted by: Atlanta Hawks
- Playing career: 1976–1984
- Position: Point guard
- Number: 24, 22
- Coaching career: 1985–present

Career history

Playing
- 1976–1980: Atlanta Hawks
- 1980–1982: Seattle SuperSonics
- 1982: San Diego Clippers
- 1982: Milwaukee Bucks
- 1983–1984: Atlanta Hawks

Coaching
- 1985–1988: Lawrenceville School (assistant)
- 1988–1991: Lawrenceville School
- 1991–1995: Princeton (assistant)
- 1995–2003: Columbia
- 2003–2004: Atlanta Hawks (assistant)
- 2004–2013: Boston Celtics (assistant)
- 2013–2020: Los Angeles Clippers (assistant)

Career highlights
- As player: Ivy League Player of the Year (1976); As coach: NBA champion (2008)

Career NBA statistics
- Points: 3,214 (6.9 ppg)
- Rebounds: 917 (2.0 rpg)
- Assists: 2,194 (4.7 apg)
- Stats at NBA.com
- Stats at Basketball Reference

Armond G. Hill (born March 31, 1953) is an American professional basketball coach and former player.

He spent eight seasons in the NBA between 1976 and 1984, playing for the Atlanta Hawks, Seattle SuperSonics, San Diego Clippers and Milwaukee Bucks. After ending his playing career in 1984, he started a coaching career, and eventually became head coach at Columbia University in 1995.

After graduating from Bishop Ford Central Catholic High School in Brooklyn, Hill attended The Lawrenceville School for a postgraduate year before attending Princeton, where he played under Hall of Fame coach Pete Carril. He was named Ivy League Men's Basketball Player of the Year as a senior in 1976 and entered the NBA draft. Drafted by the Atlanta Hawks, Hill had a solid career as a role player in the NBA, compiling 6.9 points and 4.3 assists per game over eight seasons.

After his playing career Hill returned to Princeton to complete his baccalaureate degree, earning a B.A. in psychology in 1985. He then became an assistant coach at Lawrenceville School in Lawrenceville, New Jersey. Three years later he was promoted as head coach. Hill won two Coach of the Year Awards and in 1990, led Lawrenceville to the New Jersey State Prep School Championship.

In 1991, Hill entered the collegiate level by returning to his alma mater Princeton as an assistant coach under Pete Carril. In 1995, he succeeded Jack Rohan as head coach at Columbia University. In eight seasons as head coach of the Lions, Hill was unable to lead the team to a winning campaign and compiled a 72–141 record. On March 10, 2003, two days after Columbia finished with a 2–25 record (0–14 in Ivy League play), the worst season in the school's 103-year basketball history, Hill was fired.

During the 2003–04 NBA season, Hill became an assistant coach to Terry Stotts in Atlanta. After one season, he was hired by the Boston Celtics to aid Doc Rivers as assistant coach. When Rivers became the head coach of the Los Angeles Clippers, he retained Hill as an assistant. On November 16, 2020, the Clippers announced that Hill would not be retained as assistant coach.

On June 9, 2021, Hill was named Director of Basketball Administration for men's basketball at Indiana University. He and Indiana head coach Mike Woodson coached together with the Clippers from 2014 to 2018.

== Career statistics ==
Legend
GP	Games played	GS	Games started	MPG	Minutes per game
FG%	Field goal percentage	3P%	3-point field goal percentage	FT%	Free throw percentage
RPG	Rebounds per game	APG	Assists per game	SPG	Steals per game
BPG	Blocks per game	PPG	Points per game	**Bold**	Career high
*	Led the league

=== NBA ===
==== Regular season ====
Year	Team	GP	GS	MPG	FG%	3P%	FT%	RPG	APG	SPG	BPG	PPG
1976–77	Atlanta	81		22.5	.399		.799	1.8	5.0	1.0	.1	6.0
1977–78	Atlanta	**82**	**82**	**30.9**	.415		.848	**2.8**	5.2	**1.8**	**.2**	9.7
1978–79	Atlanta	**82***	**82***	30.8	.434		**.854**	2.0	**5.9**	1.2	**.2**	**10.2**
1979–80	Atlanta	79		26.5	.411	**.250**	.849	1.7	5.4	1.4	.1	6.1
1980–81	Atlanta	24		26.0	.336	.000	.840	2.1	4.9	1.1	.1	5.0
1980–81	Seattle	51		21.8	.356	.000	.811	2.1	3.4	.8	**.2**	5.0
1981–82	Seattle	21	4	11.6	.514	–	.739	1.2	1.2	.2	.1	2.6
1981–82	San Diego	19	14	25.3	.382	.000	.688	1.4	4.3	.8	**.2**	4.7
1982–83	Milwaukee	14	3	12.1	**.538**	–	.818	1.4	1.9	.6	.0	3.3
1983–84	Atlanta	15	2	12.1	.304	–	.810	.7	2.3	.5	.0	3.0
Career		468	187	25.2	.408	.077	.829	2.0	4.7	1.2	.1	6.9

==== Playoffs ====
Year	Team	GP	MPG	FG%	3P%	FT%	RPG	APG	SPG	BPG	PPG
1978	Atlanta	2	**30.5**	.400		**1.000**	1.5	3.5	1.0	.0	**8.0**
1979	Atlanta	**9**	29.7	**.408**		.667	**1.9**	**5.6**	1.3	.1	7.3
1980	Atlanta	5	21.8	.400	.000	.917	1.2	3.0	.8	**.2**	7.0
Career		16	27.3	.405	.000	.821	1.6	4.5	1.1	.1	7.3
