= Harvey Catchings =

American basketball player (born 1951)

Personal information
- Born: September 2, 1951 (age 75) Jackson, Mississippi, U.S.
- Listed height: 6 ft 9 in (2.06 m)
- Listed weight: 218 lb (99 kg)

Career information
- High school: Jim Hill (Jackson, Mississippi)
- College: Weatherford (1969–1970); Hardin–Simmons (1971–1974)
- NBA draft: 1974: 3rd round, 42nd overall pick
- Drafted by: Philadelphia 76ers
- Playing career: 1974–1986
- Position: Center / power forward
- Number: 42, 40

Career history
- 1974–1979: Philadelphia 76ers
- 1979: New Jersey Nets
- 1979–1984: Milwaukee Bucks
- 1984–1985: Los Angeles Clippers
- 1985–1986: Segafredo Gorizia

Career NBA statistics
- Points: 2,335 (3.2 ppg)
- Rebounds: 3,639 (5.0 rpg)
- Blocks: 1,226 (1.7 bpg)
- Stats at NBA.com
- Stats at Basketball Reference

Harvey Lee Catchings (born September 2, 1951) is an American former professional basketball player.

He played in the National Basketball Association (NBA) from 1974 to 1985 as a member of the Philadelphia 76ers, New Jersey Nets, Milwaukee Bucks, and Los Angeles Clippers. He has NBA career averages of 3.2 points per game, 5.0 rebounds per game and 1.6 blocks per game. On December 18, 1976, Catchings scored a career-high 16 points alongside grabbing 11 rebounds in a 97–93 victory over the Indiana Pacers. On April 10, 1981, Catchings blocked 5 shots in only 16 minutes during Game 3 of the Eastern Conference Semifinals, a loss against the Philadelphia 76ers.

He is one of 43 NBA players to have recorded at least 10 blocks in a single game, doing it in only 20 minutes on March 21, 1975, In his career, he made the Eastern Conference Finals three times (once with Philadelphia, twice with Milwaukee) and made the NBA Finals once with Philadelphia during the 1976-77 NBA season.

== NBA career statistics ==
Legend
GP	Games played	GS	Games started	MPG	Minutes per game
FG%	Field goal percentage	3P%	3-point field goal percentage	FT%	Free throw percentage
RPG	Rebounds per game	APG	Assists per game	SPG	Steals per game
BPG	Blocks per game	PPG	Points per game	**Bold**	Career high

Year	Team	GP	GS	MPG	FG%	3P%	FT%	RPG	APG	SPG	BPG	PPG
1974–75	Philadelphia	37	–	14.3	**.554**	–	.640	4.1	0.6	0.3	1.6	2.6
1975–76	Philadelphia	75	–	**23.1**	.426	–	.604	**6.9**	0.8	0.3	2.2	3.5
1976–77	Philadelphia	53	25	16.3	.504	–	.702	4.4	0.6	0.4	1.5	3.0
1977–78	Philadelphia	61	2	12.3	.393	–	.618	4.1	0.6	0.3	1.1	2.9
1978–79	Philadelphia	25	4	11.6	.412	–	.765	3.9	0.7	0.3	1.4	2.8
1978–79	New Jersey	32	–	20.6	.423	–	**.770**	6.4	0.9	**0.5**	1.8	**6.1**
1979–80	Milwaukee	72	–	19.0	.398	.000	.629	5.7	1.1	0.3	2.3	3.2
1980–81	Milwaukee	77	–	21.2	.447	.000	.641	6.1	**1.3**	0.4	**2.4**	4.2
1981–82	Milwaukee	**80**	9	20.0	.420	.000	.594	4.5	1.2	**0.5**	1.7	2.9
1982–83	Milwaukee	74	**33**	21.0	.457	.000	.674	5.5	1.0	0.4	2.0	3.3
1983–84	Milwaukee	69	3	16.8	.399	.000	.524	3.9	0.6	0.4	1.2	2.1
1984–85	Los Angeles	70	14	15.0	.483	.000	.663	3.7	0.2	0.2	0.8	2.9
Career		725	90	18.2	.435	.000	.647	5.0	0.8	0.4	1.7	3.2

=== Playoffs ===
Year	Team	GP	GS	MPG	FG%	3P%	FT%	RPG	APG	SPG	BPG	PPG
1975–76	Philadelphia	3	–	**29.0**	.615	–	.333	**9.3**	**2.0**	0.0	**3.0**	**5.7**
1976–77	Philadelphia	8	–	6.8	.400	–	.000	1.5	0.1	0.0	0.5	0.5
1977–78	Philadelphia	7	–	3.7	.375	–	.750	1.3	0.0	0.1	0.4	1.3
1978–79	New Jersey	2	–	13.0	.167	–	.000	4.0	0.5	0.0	0.5	1.0
1979–80	Milwaukee	6	–	10.7	.333	.000	.500	3.5	0.3	0.0	1.3	1.0
1980–81	Milwaukee	7	–	15.6	.188	.000	**1.000**	3.7	1.1	0.0	1.6	1.1
1981–82	Milwaukee	6	–	4.3	**.667**	.000	.000	1.2	0.0	0.0	0.5	0.7
1982–83	Milwaukee	**9**	–	15.4	.474	.000	**1.000**	4.2	0.4	**0.2**	1.1	2.3
1983–84	Milwaukee	5	–	5.0	.500	.000	.500	1.0	0.2	0.0	0.0	0.6
Career		53	–	10.5	.397	.000	.500	2.9	0.4	0.1	0.9	1.4

== Personal life ==
Catchings is the father of WNBA former star Tamika Catchings, who played for the Indiana Fever. Catchings is currently a Reverse Mortgage Consultant with Open Mortgage-North Houston. His other daughter, Tauja, played college basketball for Illinois. His grandson through Tauja is five-star recruit Kanon Catchings who plays power forward for the Georgia Bulldogs.

Both Harvey, and his daughter Tamika, identify as Christian.

Catchings was friends with former 76ers teammate Joe Bryant, and both of their families spent time together while they each played professional basketball in Italy. Because of this, Catchings' children were childhood friends with Joe's son, Kobe Bryant.

== See also ==
- List of National Basketball Association players with most blocks in a game
