= 1978–79 New York Knicks season =

Season of National Basketball Association team the New York Knicks

- Head coach: Willis Reed; Red Holzman
- General manager: Eddie Donovan
- Arena: Madison Square Garden

Results
- Record: 31–51 (.378)
- Place: Division: 4th (Atlantic); Conference: 7th (Eastern)
- Playoff finish: Did not qualify
- Stats at Basketball Reference

Local media
- Television: WOR-TV; MSG Network
- Radio: WNEW

The 1978–79 New York Knicks season was the Knicks' 33rd season in the NBA.

== Draft picks ==
Round	Pick	Player	Position	Nationality	College
1	4	Micheal Ray Richardson	G	United States	Montana
2	32	John Rudd	SF	United States	McNeese State
2	34	Greg Bunch	SF	United States	Cal State Fullerton
3	55	Marc Iavaroni	F	United States	Virginia
4	79	Erving Giddings	SF	United States	Dayton
5	100	Greg Green		United States	Southern
6	121	Ed Warren		United States	Briar Cliff
7	144	Gary Pember		United States	Nasson College
8	162	Greg Sanders		United States	St. Bonaventure
9	178	Danny Fields		United States	UNC Wilmington
10	195	Ernest Simons		United States	Pace

== Roster ==
1978–79 New York Knicks roster
Players

Pos.	No.	Player	Height	Weight	DOB	From
C	6	Tom Barker	6 ft 11 in (2.11 m)	225 lb (102 kg)	1955-03-11	Hawaiʻi
G	9	Butch Beard	6 ft 3 in (1.91 m)	185 lb (84 kg)	1947-05-04	Louisville
F	14	Ron Behagen	6 ft 9 in (2.06 m)	185 lb (84 kg)	1951-01-14	Minnesota
F	30	Greg Bunch	6 ft 6 in (1.98 m)	190 lb (86 kg)	1956-05-15	Cal State Fullerton
G	35	Jim Cleamons	6 ft 3 in (1.91 m)	185 lb (84 kg)	1949-09-13	Ohio State
G	34	Mike Glenn	6 ft 2 in (1.88 m)	175 lb (79 kg)	1955-09-10	Southern Illinois
F	44	Glen Gondrezick	6 ft 6 in (1.98 m)	218 lb (99 kg)	1955-08-30	UNLV
F	42	Spencer Haywood	6 ft 8 in (2.03 m)	225 lb (102 kg)	1949-04-22	Detroit Mercy
F	43	Toby Knight	6 ft 9 in (2.06 m)	210 lb (95 kg)	1955-05-03	Notre Dame
F	11	Bob McAdoo	6 ft 9 in (2.06 m)	210 lb (95 kg)	1951-09-25	North Carolina
C	50	Joe Meriweather	6 ft 10 in (2.08 m)	215 lb (98 kg)	1953-10-26	Southern Illinois
G	15	Earl Monroe	6 ft 3 in (1.91 m)	185 lb (84 kg)	1944-11-21	Winston-Salem State
G	20	Michael Ray Richardson	6 ft 5 in (1.96 m)	189 lb (86 kg)	1955-04-11	Montana
F	52	John Rudd	6 ft 7 in (2.01 m)	230 lb (104 kg)	1955-08-07	McNeese State
C	40	Marvin Webster	7 ft 1 in (2.16 m)	225 lb (102 kg)	1952-04-03	Morgan State
G	13	Ray Williams	6 ft 3 in (1.91 m)	188 lb (85 kg)	1954-10-14	Minnesota

Coaches
Head coach
- Willis Reed
- Red Holzman

Legend
- (DP) Unsigned draft pick
- (FA) Free agent
- (S) Suspended
- Injured

Roster

== Regular season ==
=== Season standings ===
Atlantic Division	W	L	PCT	GB	Home	Road	Div
y-Washington Bullets	54	28	.659	–	31–10	23–18	11–5
x-Philadelphia 76ers	47	35	.573	7	31–10	16–25	9–7
x-New Jersey Nets	37	45	.451	17	25–16	12–29	7–9
New York Knicks	31	51	.378	23	23–18	8–33	7–9
Boston Celtics	29	53	.354	25	21–20	8–33	6–10

#	Eastern Conference				
#	Team	W	L	PCT	GB
1	z-Washington Bullets	54	28	.659	–
2	y-San Antonio Spurs	48	34	.585	6
3	x-Philadelphia 76ers	47	35	.573	7
4	x-Houston Rockets	47	35	.573	7
5	x-Atlanta Hawks	46	36	.561	8
6	x-New Jersey Nets	37	45	.451	17
7	New York Knicks	31	51	.378	23
8	Cleveland Cavaliers	30	52	.366	24
8	Detroit Pistons	30	52	.366	24
10	Boston Celtics	29	53	.354	25
11	New Orleans Jazz	26	56	.317	28

z – clinched division title
y – clinched division title
x – clinched playoff spot
