= 1978–79 San Antonio Spurs season =

- Division champions
- Head coach: Doug Moe
- General manager: John Begzos
- Owner: Angelo Drossos
- Arena: HemisFair Arena

Results
- Record: 48–34 (.585)
- Place: Division: 1st (Central); Conference: 2nd (Eastern)
- Playoff finish: Conference finals (lost to Bullets 3–4)
- Stats at Basketball Reference

Local media
- Television: KMOL (Terry Stembridge)
- Radio: WOAI (Terry Stembridge)

The 1978–79 San Antonio Spurs season was the Spurs' third season in the NBA and 12th season as a franchise.

== Draft picks ==
Round	Pick	Player	Position	Nationality	College
1	20	Frankie Sanders		United States	Southern
3	64	Gerald Henderson	PG	United States	Virginia Commonwealth
4	86	Rich Adams		United States	Illinois
5	108	Eugene Parker		United States	Purdue
6	129	Harry Morgan		United States	Indiana State
7	150	Hector Olivencia		United States	Sacred Heart
8	168	Henry Taylor		United States	Texas-Pan American
9	185	Rick Taylor		United States	Arizona State
10	200	Larry Brewster		United States	Florida

== Roster ==
1978–79 San Antonio Spurs roster
Players

Pos.	No.	Player	Height	Weight	DOB	From
SF	30	Allan Bristow	6 ft 7 in (2.01 m)	210 lb (95 kg)		Virginia Tech
PG	10	Louie Dampier	6 ft 0 in (1.83 m)	170 lb (77 kg)		Kentucky
F/C	25	Coby Dietrick	6 ft 10 in (2.08 m)	220 lb (100 kg)		San José State
G	12	Mike Gale	6 ft 4 in (1.93 m)	185 lb (84 kg)		Elizabeth City State
G/F	44	George Gervin	6 ft 7 in (2.01 m)	180 lb (82 kg)		Eastern Michigan
C	23	Mike Green	6 ft 10 in (2.08 m)	200 lb (91 kg)		Louisiana Tech
F	35	Larry Kenon	6 ft 9 in (2.06 m)	205 lb (93 kg)		Memphis
PF	34	Glenn Mosley	6 ft 8 in (2.03 m)	195 lb (88 kg)		Seton Hall
F	53	Mark Olberding	6 ft 8 in (2.03 m)	225 lb (102 kg)		Minnesota
F/C	5	Billy Paultz	6 ft 11 in (2.11 m)	235 lb (107 kg)		St. John's
G	13	James Silas	6 ft 1 in (1.85 m)	180 lb (82 kg)		Stephen F. Austin

Coaches
Head coach
- Doug Moe (North Carolina)
Assistant(s)
- Bob Bass (Oklahoma Baptist)

Legend
- (DP) Unsigned draft pick
- (FA) Free agent
- (S) Suspended
- Injured

== Regular season ==
=== Season standings ===
Central Division	W	L	PCT	GB	Home	Road	Div
y-San Antonio Spurs	48	34	.585	–	29–12	19–22	11–9
x-Houston Rockets	47	35	.573	1	30–11	17–24	12–8
x-Atlanta Hawks	46	36	.561	2	34–7	12–29	14–6
Cleveland Cavaliers	30	52	.366	18	20–21	10–31	6–14
Detroit Pistons	30	52	.366	18	22–19	8–33	9–11
New Orleans Jazz	26	56	.317	22	21–20	8–33	9–15

#	Eastern Conference				
#	Team	W	L	PCT	GB
1	z-Washington Bullets	54	28	.659	–
2	y-San Antonio Spurs	48	34	.585	6
3	x-Philadelphia 76ers	47	35	.573	7
4	x-Houston Rockets	47	35	.573	7
5	x-Atlanta Hawks	46	36	.561	8
6	x-New Jersey Nets	37	45	.451	17
7	New York Knicks	31	51	.378	23
8	Cleveland Cavaliers	30	52	.366	24
8	Detroit Pistons	30	52	.366	24
10	Boston Celtics	29	53	.354	25
11	New Orleans Jazz	26	56	.317	28

z - clinched division title
y - clinched division title
x - clinched playoff spot

== Game log ==
=== Regular season ===
1978–79 game log
Total: 48–34 (home: 29–12; road: 19–22)
October: 5–4 (home: 3–1; road: 2–3)

Game	Date	Team	Score	High points	High rebounds	High assists	Location Attendance	Record
5	October 20	@ Seattle	L 117–133				Kingdome; 20,172	3–2

November: 5–7 (home: 3–3; road: 2–4)

Game	Date	Team	Score	High points	High rebounds	High assists	Location Attendance	Record
12	November 4	@ Washington	L 119–124				Capital Centre; 12,619	6–6
15	November 11	Washington	W 143–124				HemisFair Arena; 12,363	8–7

December: 12–4 (home: 6–1; road: 6–3)

Game	Date	Team	Score	High points	High rebounds	High assists	Location Attendance	Record
25	December 10	@ Seattle	L 99–112				Kingdome; 13,847	12–13

January: 9–5 (home: 7–1; road: 2–4)

Game	Date	Team	Score	High points	High rebounds	High assists	Location Attendance	Record
48	January 26	Seattle	W 125–108				HemisFair Arena; 13,659	30–18

February: 7–5 (home: 5–1; road: 2–4)

Game	Date	Team	Score	High points	High rebounds	High assists	Location Attendance	Record
51	February 1	Washington	L 122–123				HemisFair Arena; 12,516	31–21
61	February 20	Seattle	W 118–102				HemisFair Arena; 11,765	36–25

March: 6–8 (home: 3–5; road: 3–3)

Game	Date	Team	Score	High points	High rebounds	High assists	Location Attendance	Record
65	March 4	@ Washington	L 128–129				Capital Centre; 17,181	39–26

April: 4–1 (home: 2–0; road: 2–1)

Game	Date	Team	Score	High points	High rebounds	High assists	Location Attendance	Record

1978–79 schedule

== Playoffs ==
1979 playoff game log
Conference semifinals: 4–3 (home: 3–1; road: 1–2)

Game	Date	Team	Score	High points	High rebounds	High assists	Location Attendance	Series
1	April 15	Philadelphia	W 119–106	Larry Kenon (30)	Billy Paultz (9)	Silas, Bristow (7)	HemisFair Arena; 10,253	1–0
2	April 17	Philadelphia	W 121–120	George Gervin (29)	Larry Kenon (7)	Silas, Gale (8)	HemisFair Arena; 16,709	2–0
3	April 20	@ Philadelphia	L 115–123	James Silas (32)	Larry Kenon (15)	Kenon, Gervin (5)	Spectrum; 14,039	2–1
4	April 22	@ Philadelphia	W 115–112	George Gervin (32)	Larry Kenon (9)	Larry Kenon (6)	Spectrum; 11,163	3–1
5	April 26	Philadelphia	L 97–120	James Silas (19)	Larry Kenon (9)	Silas, Gale (5)	HemisFair Arena; 16,055	3–2
6	April 29	@ Philadelphia	L 90–92	James Silas (27)	Larry Kenon (15)	Mike Gale (6)	Spectrum; 18,276	3–3
7	May 2	Philadelphia	W 111–108	George Gervin (33)	George Gervin (12)	Mark Olberding (7)	HemisFair Arena; 16,055	4–3

Conference finals: 3–4 (home: 2–1; road: 1–3)

Game	Date	Team	Score	High points	High rebounds	High assists	Location Attendance	Series
1	May 4	@ Washington	W 118–97	George Gervin (34)	Larry Kenon (21)	James Silas (4)	Capital Centre; 19,035	1–0
2	May 6	@ Washington	L 95–115	Larry Kenon (25)	Larry Kenon (8)	Olberding, Dietrick (3)	Capital Centre; 19,035	1–1
3	May 9	Washington	W 116–114	George Gervin (29)	Billy Paultz (12)	Kenon, Gale (5)	HemisFair Arena; 15,318	2–1
4	May 11	Washington	W 118–102	George Gervin (42)	Larry Kenon (17)	Silas, Gale (6)	HemisFair Arena; 16,055	3–1
5	May 13	@ Washington	W 103–107	George Gervin (28)	Mark Olberding (13)	James Silas (6)	Capital Centre; 19,035	3–2
6	May 16	Washington	L 100–108	George Gervin (20)	Larry Kenon (15)	James Silas (7)	HemisFair Arena; 16,055	3–3
7	May 18	@ Washington	L 105–107	George Gervin (42)	Larry Kenon (11)	James Silas (5)	Capital Centre; 19,035	3–4

1979 schedule

== Player statistics ==
=== Regular season ===
Player	POS	GP	GS	MP	REB	AST	STL	BLK	PTS	MPG	RPG	APG	SPG	BPG	PPG
Mike Gale	SG	82		2,121	186	374	152	40	659	25.9	2.3	4.6	1.9	.5	8.0
Larry Kenon	PF	81		2,947	790	335	154	19	1,791	36.4	9.8	4.1	1.9	.2	22.1
George Gervin	SF	80		2,888	400	219	137	91	2,365	36.1	5.0	2.7	1.7	1.1	29.6
Mark Olberding	PF	80		1,885	429	211	53	18	755	23.6	5.4	2.6	.7	.2	9.4
James Silas	PG	79		2,171	183	273	76	20	1,266	27.5	2.3	3.5	1.0	.3	16.0
Billy Paultz	C	79		2,122	625	178	35	125	912	26.9	7.9	2.3	.4	1.6	11.5
Mike Green	C	76		1,641	354	116	37	122	571	21.6	4.7	1.5	.5	1.6	7.5
Coby Dietrick	C	76		1,487	315	198	72	38	497	19.6	4.1	2.6	.9	.5	6.5
Allan Bristow	SF	74		1,324	247	231	56	15	472	17.9	3.3	3.1	.8	.2	6.4
Louie Dampier	PG	70		760	63	124	35	8	275	10.9	.9	1.8	.5	.1	3.9
Glenn Mosley	PF	26		221	64	19	8	10	85	8.5	2.5	.7	.3	.4	3.3
Frankie Sanders^{†}	SF	22		263	59	35	14	3	132	12.0	2.7	1.6	.6	.1	6.0

- ^{†} Denotes player spent time with another team in the season. Stats reflect time with the Spurs only.

=== Playoffs ===
Player	POS	GP	GS	MP	REB	AST	STL	BLK	PTS	MPG	RPG	APG	SPG	BPG	PPG
Larry Kenon	PF	14		557	160	42	20	1	295	39.8	11.4	3.0	1.4	.1	21.1
George Gervin	SF	14		513	82	35	27	14	400	36.6	5.9	2.5	1.9	1.0	28.6
James Silas	PG	14		475	42	66	21	1	267	33.9	3.0	4.7	1.5	.1	19.1
Mark Olberding	PF	14		359	69	33	12	5	111	25.6	4.9	2.4	.9	.4	7.9
Mike Green	C	14		350	73	11	13	36	110	25.0	5.2	.8	.9	2.6	7.9
Mike Gale	SG	14		302	29	56	16	4	95	21.6	2.1	4.0	1.1	.3	6.8
Coby Dietrick	C	14		281	65	26	12	3	82	20.1	4.6	1.9	.9	.2	5.9
Billy Paultz	C	13		299	98	30	4	13	82	23.0	7.5	2.3	.3	1.0	6.3
Allan Bristow	SF	13		163	27	28	9	5	56	12.5	2.1	2.2	.7	.4	4.3
Louie Dampier	PG	7		55	5	8	3	1	20	7.9	.7	1.1	.4	.1	2.9
Glenn Mosley	PF	3		6	1	1	0	1	5	2.0	.3	.3	.0	.3	1.7

== Awards and records ==
- George Gervin, All-NBA First Team
