= Cal State Fullerton Titans men's basketball =

Basketball team, California State University

Cal State Fullerton Titans
2026–27 Cal State Fullerton Titans men's basketball team
- University: California State University, Fullerton
- Head coach: Dedrique Taylor (14th season)
- Location: Fullerton, California
- Arena: Titan Gym (capacity: 4,000)
- Conference: Big West
- Nickname: Titans
- Colors: Navy blue, white, and orange

NCAA Division I tournament Elite Eight
- 1978
Other NCAA Division I tournament results
Sweet Sixteen	1978
Appearances	1978, 2008, 2018, 2022

Conference tournament champions
- 1978, 2008, 2018, 2022

Conference regular-season champions
- 1976, 2008

Uniforms
Home	Away	Alternate

The Cal State Fullerton Titans men's basketball team is the basketball team that represents California State University, Fullerton in Fullerton, California, United States. The school's team currently competes in the Big West Conference.

== History ==
In 1978, the Fullerton men's basketball team, coached by Bobby Dye, made it to the Elite 8 in the 1978 NCAA Division I basketball tournament. They were considered the year's Cinderella story as a #7 seed (out of 8). The team defeated University of New Mexico at Tempe, AZ, and then defeated the University of San Francisco before losing to the University of Arkansas in regionals at Albuquerque, New Mexico. Fullerton was led by Greg Bunch, a CSUF Hall of Famer.

Bob Burton was head coach of the Titans men's team starting with the 2003–04 season. In 2008, the team finished the season 24-9, defeated UC Irvine 81-66 in the Big West Conference Championship. They qualified for their second NCAA tournament (first in 30 years), where they faced the (#3) Wisconsin Badgers as a #14 seed in the first round of the NCAA tournament, losing the game 71–58. After the 2013–14 season, Burton resigned on June 22, 2012 after nine seasons. His final record at Fullerton was 155–122.

During the 2012–13 season, interim head coach Andy Newman replaced Burton and guided the Titans to a 14–18 record overall and 6–12 record in the Big West Conference.

For the start of the 2013–14 season, Fullerton hired Dedrique Taylor as the team's head coach. Previously, Taylor had been an assistant under coach Herb Sendek at Arizona State University since 2006. Prior to that, Taylor also coached at the University of Nevada, Portland State, Loyola Marymount University and UC Davis. Taylor, has been long respected as one of the top recruiters in the west with strong ties to the Los Angeles area, thought to be a key component in winning at Fullerton. Taylor led the 2017–18 team to an invitation to play in the 2018 NCAA Division I men's basketball tournament. The team lost in the first round to Purdue.

In 2022 the Titans qualified for the NCAA tournament as a #15 seed; they lost in the first round to Duke.

== Post season results ==
=== NCAA tournament results ===
The Titans have appeared in four NCAA tournaments. Their combined record is 2–4.

Year	Seed	Round	Opponent	Result
1978		Regional Quarterfinals; Regional semifinals Regional Finals	New Mexico; San Francisco; Arkansas	W 90–85; W 75–72; L 58–61
2008	#14	First round	#3 Wisconsin	L 56–71
2018	#15	First round	#2 Purdue	L 48–74
2022	#15	First round	#2 Duke	L 61–78

=== NIT results ===
The Titans have appeared in three National Invitation Tournaments (NIT). Their combined record is 2–3.

Year	Round	Opponent	Result
1983	First round	Arizona State	L 83–87
1987	First round	California	L 68–72
2005	Opening Round; First round Second Round	Oregon State; San Francisco; Georgetown	W 85–83; W 85–69; L 57–74

=== CIT results ===
The Titans have appeared in the CollegeInsider.com Postseason Tournament (CIT) three times. Their combined record is 0–3.

Year	Round	Opponent	Result
2012	First round	Loyola Marymount	L 79–88
2017	First round	Weber State	L 76–80
2019	First round	Cal State Bakersfield	L 58–66

=== NAIA tournament results ===
The Titans have appeared in the NAIA Tournament one time. Their combined record is 2–1.

Year	Round	Opponent	Result
1962	First round Second Round; Quarterfinals	Stetson; Lewis & Clark; Westminster	W 94–79; W 97–78; L 55–63

== Retired numbers ==
Cal State Fullerton Titans retired numbers
No.	Player	Career	No. ret.	Ref.
4	Rodney Anderson	1999–2000	2004	
20	Leon Wood	1981–1984		
30	Greg Bunch	1974–1978		

== NBA players ==
Player	Career	Draft
Greg Bunch	1974–1978	1978 : 2(34)
Mike Niles	1980–1981	1979 : 2(83)
Leon Wood	1981–1984	1984: 1(10)
Kevin Henderson	1983–1986	1986 : 3(50)
Richard Morton	1983–1986	1986 : 3(50)
Henry Turner	1984–1988	1988 : undrafted, debut in 1988
Cedric Ceballos	1988–1990	1990 : 4(90)
Bruce Bowen	1989–1993	1993 : undrafted, debut in 1997
Pape Sow	2001–2004	2004 : 2(48)
Bobby Brown	2003–2007	2007 : undrafted, debut in 2008
Josh Akognon	2007–2009	2009 : undrafted, debut in 2013

== Players in international leagues ==
- Khalil Ahmad (born 1996), basketball player in the Israeli Basketball Premier League
- DJ Brewton (born 2000), basketball player in the Israeli Basketball Premier League
- Marcio Lassiter (born 1987), Filipino-American basketball player for San Miguel Beermen in the PBA
- Dwight Ramos (born 1998), Filipino-American professional basketball player for Levanga Hokkaido of the Japanese B.League
- Jackson Rowe (born 1997), Canadian basketball player in the Israeli Basketball Premier League
- Kwame Vaughn (born 1990), basketball player for Maccabi Haifa in the Israeli Basketball National League
