= 1978–79 Washington Bullets season =

NBA professional basketball team season

- Conference champions
- Division champions
- Head coach: Dick Motta
- Arena: Capital Centre

Results
- Record: 54–28 (.659)
- Place: Division: 1st (Atlantic); Conference: 1st (Eastern)
- Playoff finish: NBA Finals (lost to SuperSonics 1–4)
- Stats at Basketball Reference

Local media
- Television: WDCA
- Radio: WTOP

The 1978–79 Washington Bullets won their second consecutive Eastern Conference Championship, making it to the NBA Finals before losing to the Seattle SuperSonics. They finished the regular season with the best record in the NBA, at 54–28.

Coming off of their NBA Championship the previous season, the Bullets were transferred to the Atlantic Division. The Bullets would continue to remain one of the top teams in the league, as they captured the Atlantic Division championship with a league best record of 54–28. The Bullets ended the regular season losing 8 of their last 11 games, but rebounded in the playoffs with victories in both the Eastern Conference semifinals and Eastern Conference finals over the Atlanta Hawks and the San Antonio Spurs, respectively. The Bullets would proceed to have a 38-year drought without a division title until 2017; by then they had been renamed the Washington Wizards. This is the most recent appearance in the conference finals or NBA Finals for the franchise. This also remains the last 50-win season for Washington.

Since this season, the Bullets/Wizards have only won five playoff series, none beyond the first round.

== Offseason ==
=== NBA draft ===
- Round 1: Roger Phegley, Dave Corzine
- Round 2: Terry Sykes (Never played in the NBA)
- Round 4: Lawrence Boston

== Roster ==
1978–79 Washington Bullets roster
Players

Pos.	No.	Player	Height	Weight	DOB	From
F	42	Greg Ballard	6 ft 7 in (2.01 m)	215 lb (98 kg)		Oregon
C	40	Dave Corzine	6 ft 11 in (2.11 m)	250 lb (113 kg)		DePaul
G	45	Phil Chenier	6 ft 3 in (1.91 m)	180 lb (82 kg)		California
SF	10	Bob Dandridge	6 ft 6 in (1.98 m)	195 lb (88 kg)		Norfolk State
F	35	Kevin Grevey	6 ft 5 in (1.96 m)	210 lb (95 kg)		Kentucky
G	14	Tom Henderson	6 ft 3 in (1.91 m)	190 lb (86 kg)		Hawaiʻi
C	11	Elvin Hayes	6 ft 9 in (2.06 m)	235 lb (107 kg)		Houston
PF	25	Mitch Kupchak	6 ft 9 in (2.06 m)	230 lb (104 kg)		North Carolina
G	15	Charles Johnson	6 ft 0 in (1.83 m)	170 lb (77 kg)		California
G	22	Roger Phegley	6 ft 6 in (1.98 m)	205 lb (93 kg)		Bradley
F	41	Wes Unseld	6 ft 7 in (2.01 m)	245 lb (111 kg)		Louisville
G	32	Larry Wright	6 ft 1 in (1.85 m)	160 lb (73 kg)		Grambling State

Coaches
Head coach
- Dick Motta
Assistant(s)
- Bernie Bickerstaff

Legend
- (DP) Unsigned draft pick
- (FA) Free agent
- (S) Suspended
- Injured

== Regular season ==
=== Season standings ===
Atlantic Division	W	L	PCT	GB	Home	Road	Div
y-Washington Bullets	54	28	.659	–	31–10	23–18	11–5
x-Philadelphia 76ers	47	35	.573	7	31–10	16–25	9–7
x-New Jersey Nets	37	45	.451	17	25–16	12–29	7–9
New York Knicks	31	51	.378	23	23–18	8–33	7–9
Boston Celtics	29	53	.354	25	21–20	8–33	6–10

#	Eastern Conference				
#	Team	W	L	PCT	GB
1	z-Washington Bullets	54	28	.659	–
2	y-San Antonio Spurs	48	34	.585	6
3	x-Philadelphia 76ers	47	35	.573	7
4	x-Houston Rockets	47	35	.573	7
5	x-Atlanta Hawks	46	36	.561	8
6	x-New Jersey Nets	37	45	.451	17
7	New York Knicks	31	51	.378	23
8	Cleveland Cavaliers	30	52	.366	24
8	Detroit Pistons	30	52	.366	24
10	Boston Celtics	29	53	.354	25
11	New Orleans Jazz	26	56	.317	28

== Game log ==
=== Regular season ===
1977–78 game log
Total: 54–28 (home: 31–10; road: 23–18)
October: 4–5 (home: 3–1; road: 1–4)

Game	Date	Team	Score	High points	High rebounds	High assists	Location Attendance	Record
3	October 18	@ Philadelphia	W 121–111	Johnson (19)	Unseld (11)	Henderson, Unseld (6)	Spectrum; 12,065	3–0
6	October 25	@ Seattle	L 92–121	Dandridge (16)	Ballard (9)	Dandridge (6)	Kingdome; 15,089	4–2
9	October 31	Atlanta	L 108–110	Dandridge (26)	Kupchak (10)	Unseld (10)	Capital Centre; 5,487	4–5

November: 11–2 (home: 6–1; road: 5–1)

Game	Date	Team	Score	High points	High rebounds	High assists	Location Attendance	Record
11	November 4	San Antonio	W 124–119	Hayes (28)	Hayes (14)	Henderson (11)	Capital Centre; 12,619	6–5
13	November 10	Philadelphia	L 122–123	Hayes (36)	Unseld (17)	Dandridge, Grevey, Henderson (5)	Capital Centre; 14,697	7–6
14	November 11	@ San Antonio	L 124–143	Kupchak (27)	Hayes (11)	Henderson (8)	HemisFair Arena; 12,363	7–7
18	November 18	Denver	W 119–114	Dandridge (19)	Hayes, Unseld (11)	Unseld (11)	Capital Centre; 13,505	11–7

December: 9–5 (home: 5–2; road: 4–3)

Game	Date	Team	Score	High points	High rebounds	High assists	Location Attendance	Record
24	December 2	Kansas City	L 109–110	Grevey (28)	Kupchak (13)	Henderson (11)	Capital Centre; 14,297	16–8
28	December 9	Phoenix	W 101–98	Dandridge (23)	Unseld (20)	Henderson (9)	Capital Centre; 17,438	19–9
32	December 20	@ Phoenix	W 137–129	Dandridge (36)	Hayes (11)	Henderson (13)	Arizona Veterans Memorial Coliseum; 9,789	23–9

January: 10–3 (home: 7–1; road: 3–2)

Game	Date	Team	Score	High points	High rebounds	High assists	Location Attendance	Record
38	January 5	Phoenix	W 104–94	Kupchak (25)	Hayes (26)	Henderson (10)	Capital Centre; 14,929	26–12
39	January 6	@ Atlanta	W 106–102	Hayes (26)	Hayes (13)	Wright (6)	The Omni; 9,105	27–12
40	January 9	@ Denver	L 90–121	Hayes (18)	Ballard, Corzine (8)	Dandridge (4)	McNichols Sports Arena; 13,872	27–13
45	January 23	Seattle	L 100–103	Dandridge (23)	Unseld (13)	Dandridge (7)	Capital Centre; 15,232	31–14
47	January 26	@ Kansas City	L 128–142	Hayes (28)	Hayes (13)	Unseld (6)	Kemper Arena; 10,301	32–15
49	January 30	Atlanta	W 109–105	Hayes (23)	Hayes (18)	Dandridge (6)	Capital Centre; 14,398	34–15

February: 8–4 (home: 3–1; road: 5–3)

Game	Date	Team	Score	High points	High rebounds	High assists	Location Attendance	Record
50	February 1	@ San Antonio	W 123–122	Dandridge (36)	Unseld (19)	Henderson (10)	HemisFair Arena; 12,516	35–15
All-Star Break
53	February 11	@ Philadelphia	L 99–107	Dandridge (29)	Dandridge (17)	Dandridge (6)	Spectrum; 15,151	37–16
55	February 15	@ Phoenix	L 108–119	Dandridge (30)	Hayes (13)	Henderson (6)	Arizona Veterans Memorial Coliseum; 12,660	38–17
57	February 18	@ Seattle	W 105–94	Hayes (33)	Hayes (16)	Dandridge (7)	Kingdome; 21,935	39–18
59	February 23	Seattle	W 132–110	Hayes (32)	Unseld (13)	Tied (7)	Capital Centre; 19,035	40–19

March: 9–6 (home: 5–3; road: 4–3)

Game	Date	Team	Score	High points	High rebounds	High assists	Location Attendance	Record
62	March 4	San Antonio	W 129–128	Hayes (32)	Hayes (20)	Henderson (10)	Capital Centre; 17,181	43–19
64	March 9	@ Kansas City	L 116–121	Dandridge (38)	Dandridge (12)	Johnson, Unseld, Wright (3)	Kemper Arena; 13,681	43–21
65	March 11	@ Denver	W 119–98	Grevey (28)	Ballard, Unseld (11)	Wright (8)	McNichols Sports Arena; 15,326	44–21
74	March 27	Philadelphia	L 97–100	Hayes (23)	Unseld (16)	Unseld (7)	Capital Centre; 18,741	50–24

April: 3–3 (home: 2–1; road: 1–2)

Game	Date	Team	Score	High points	High rebounds	High assists	Location Attendance	Record
77	April 1	Denver	W 105–89	Hayes (30)	Hayes (18)	Wright (12)	Capital Centre; 17,554	52–27
81	April 7	@ Atlanta	L 102–103	Hayes (29)	Unseld (15)	Unseld (7)	The Omni; 15,641	54–27

1978–79 schedule

== Playoffs ==
1979 playoff game log
Eastern Conference Semifinals: 4–3 (home: 2–2; road: 2–1)

Game	Date	Team	Score	High points	High rebounds	High assists	Location Attendance	Series
1	April 15	Atlanta	W 103–89	Hayes (31)	Hayes (15)	Wright (6)	Capital Centre; 15,721	1–0
2	April 17	Atlanta	L 99–107	Dandridge (36)	Unseld (10)	Henderson (8)	Capital Centre; 19,035	1–1
3	April 20	@ Atlanta	W 89–77	Hayes (19)	Unseld (16)	Unseld (8)	The Omni; 15,798	2–1
4	April 22	@ Atlanta	W 120–115 (OT)	Hayes (29)	Hayes (17)	Dandridge (5)	The Omni; 15,798	3–1
5	April 24	Atlanta	L 103–107	Hayes (26)	Hayes (14)	Henderson (11)	Capital Centre; 19,035	3–2
6	April 26	@ Atlanta	L 86–104	Hayes (24)	Unseld (12)	Unseld (6)	The Omni; 15,978	3–3
7	April 29	Atlanta	W 100–94	Hayes (39)	Hayes (15)	Dandridge (8)	Capital Centre; 19,035	4–3

Eastern Conference Finals: 4–3 (home: 3–1; road: 1–2)

Game	Date	Team	Score	High points	High rebounds	High assists	Location Attendance	Series
1	May 4	San Antonio	L 97–118	Dandridge (25)	Hayes (20)	Henderson (5)	Capital Centre; 19,035	0–1
2	May 6	San Antonio	W 115–95	Unseld (26)	Unseld (22)	Henderson (9)	Capital Centre; 19,035	1–1
3	May 9	@ San Antonio	L 114–116	Dandridge (28)	Hayes (23)	Unseld (8)	HemisFair Arena; 15,318	1–2
4	May 11	@ San Antonio	L 102–118	Hayes (23)	Unseld (21)	Dandridge (9)	HemisFair Arena; 16,055	1–3
5	May 13	San Antonio	W 107–103	Hayes (24)	Hayes (22)	Henderson (9)	Capital Centre; 19,035	2–3
6	May 16	@ San Antonio	W 108–100	Hayes (25)	Hayes (14)	Dandridge, Henderson (8)	HemisFair Arena; 16,055	3–3
7	May 18	San Antonio	W 107–105	Dandridge (37)	Hayes (15)	Wright (7)	Capital Centre; 19,035	4–3

NBA Finals: 1–4 (home: 1–2; road: 0–2)

Game	Date	Team	Score	High points	High rebounds	High assists	Location Attendance	Series
1	May 20	Seattle	W 99–97	Wright (26)	Unseld (12)	Henderson (6)	Capital Centre; 19,035	1–0
2	May 24	Seattle	L 82–92	Dandridge (21)	Hayes (14)	Dandridge (5)	Capital Centre; 19,035	1–1
3	May 27	@ Seattle	L 95–105	Dandridge (28)	Tied (14)	Dandridge (5)	Kingdome; 35,928	1–2
4	May 29	@ Seattle	L 112–114 (OT)	Tied (18)	Unseld (16)	Henderson (8)	Seattle Center Coliseum; 14,098	1–3
5	June 1	Seattle	L 93–97	Hayes (29)	Hayes (14)	Dandridge (7)	Capital Centre; 19,035	1–4

1979 schedule

== Awards and honors ==
- Bob Ferry, NBA Executive of the Year Award
- Elvin Hayes, All-NBA First Team
- Bob Dandridge, All-NBA Second Team
- Bob Dandridge, NBA All-Defensive First Team
