= 1978–79 Philadelphia 76ers season =

NBA professional basketball team season

- Head coach: Billy Cunningham
- General manager: Pat Williams
- Arena: The Spectrum

Results
- Record: 47–35 (.573)
- Place: Division: 2nd (Atlantic); Conference: 3rd (Eastern)
- Playoff finish: East Conference Semifinals (eliminated 3–4)
- Stats at Basketball Reference

Local media
- Television: WKBS-TV; PRISM
- Radio: WCAU

The 1978–79 Philadelphia 76ers season was the 76ers 30th season in the NBA and 16th season in Philadelphia. Coach Billy Cunningham began to mold a unit that played a team concept, as opposed to one made up of stars focusing on their own individual talents. The trade for forward Bobby Jones and the drafting of point guard Maurice Cheeks, further solidified this progression. The Sixers would finish the regular season at 47–35. They would lose in the Eastern Conference semi-finals to the San Antonio Spurs. From 1977 through 1983 (seven seasons), this would be the only year that the team failed to reach the Eastern Conference Finals.

This was the first season under their new uniforms, in which the team wore red on the road, which they would retain for the next decade.

== Draft picks ==
Round	Pick	Player	Position	Nationality	College
2	36	Maurice Cheeks	PG	United States	West Texas A&M
2	43	Glenn Hagan	G	United States	St. Bonaventure
4	87	Brett Vroman	C	United States	UNLV
5	109	Mark Haymore	PF/C	United States	UMass
6	130	Osborne Lockhart		United States	Minnesota
7	151	Anthony Murray		United States	Alabama
8	169	Alan Cunningham	F	United States	Colorado State
10	201	Dennis James		United States	Widener

== Roster ==
1978–79 Philadelphia 76ers roster
Players

Pos.	No.	Player	Height	Weight	DOB	From
G	14	Henry Bibby	6 ft 1 in (1.85 m)	185 lb (84 kg)	1949–11–24	UCLA
F/C	23	Joe Bryant	6 ft 9 in (2.06 m)	185 lb (84 kg)	1954–10–19	La Salle
F/C	42	Harvey Catchings	6 ft 9 in (2.06 m)	218 lb (99 kg)	1951–09–02	Hardin–Simmons
G	10	Maurice Cheeks	6 ft 1 in (1.85 m)	180 lb (82 kg)	1956–09–08	West Texas A&M
G	20	Doug Collins	6 ft 6 in (1.98 m)	180 lb (82 kg)	1951-07-28	Illinois State
C	53	Darryl Dawkins	6 ft 11 in (2.11 m)	251 lb (114 kg)	1957-01-11	Maynard Evans HS (FL)
F	6	Julius Erving	6 ft 6 in (1.98 m)	210 lb (95 kg)	1950-02-22	UMass
F	24	Bobby Jones	6 ft 9 in (2.06 m)	210 lb (95 kg)	1951–12–18	North Carolina
C	11	Caldwell Jones	6 ft 11 in (2.11 m)	217 lb (98 kg)	1950–08–04	Albany State
F	50	Steve Mix	6 ft 7 in (2.01 m)	215 lb (98 kg)	1947–12–30	Toledo
G	22	Eric Money	6 ft 0 in (1.83 m)	170 lb (77 kg)	1955–02–06	Arizona
G	4	Marlon Redmond	6 ft 6 in (1.98 m)	188 lb (85 kg)	1955–04–15	San Francisco
G	30	Al Skinner	6 ft 3 in (1.91 m)	190 lb (86 kg)	1952–06–16	UMass

Coaches
Head coach
- Billy Cunningham
Assistant(s)
- Chuck Daly
- Jack McMahon

Legend
- (DP) Unsigned draft pick
- (FA) Free agent
- (S) Suspended
- Injured

== Regular season ==
=== Season standings ===
Atlantic Division	W	L	PCT	GB	Home	Road	Div
y-Washington Bullets	54	28	.659	–	31–10	23–18	11–5
x-Philadelphia 76ers	47	35	.573	7	31–10	16–25	9–7
x-New Jersey Nets	37	45	.451	17	25–16	12–29	7–9
New York Knicks	31	51	.378	23	23–18	8–33	7–9
Boston Celtics	29	53	.354	25	21–20	8–33	6–10

#	Eastern Conference				
#	Team	W	L	PCT	GB
1	z-Washington Bullets	54	28	.659	–
2	y-San Antonio Spurs	48	34	.585	6
3	x-Philadelphia 76ers	47	35	.573	7
4	x-Houston Rockets	47	35	.573	7
5	x-Atlanta Hawks	46	36	.561	8
6	x-New Jersey Nets	37	45	.451	17
7	New York Knicks	31	51	.378	23
8	Cleveland Cavaliers	30	52	.366	24
8	Detroit Pistons	30	52	.366	24
10	Boston Celtics	29	53	.354	25
11	New Orleans Jazz	26	56	.317	28

z - clinched division title
y - clinched division title
x - clinched playoff spot

== Playoffs ==
1979 playoff game log
First Round: 2–0 (home: 1–0; road: 1–0)

Game	Date	Team	Score	High points	High rebounds	High assists	Location Attendance	Series
1	April 11	New Jersey	W 122–114	Julius Erving (28)	Julius Erving (14)	Henry Bibby (8)	Spectrum; 8,846	1–0
2	April 13	@ New Jersey	W 111–101	Caldwell Jones (24)	Caldwell Jones (21)	three players tied (5)	Rutgers Athletic Center; 9,126	2–0

Conference Semifinals: 3–4 (home: 2–1; road: 1–3)

Game	Date	Team	Score	High points	High rebounds	High assists	Location Attendance	Series
1	April 15	@ San Antonio	L 106–119	Darryl Dawkins (25)	Caldwell Jones (15)	Julius Erving (7)	HemisFair Arena; 10,253	0–1
2	April 17	@ San Antonio	L 120–121	Julius Erving (25)	Caldwell Jones (11)	Henry Bibby (10)	HemisFair Arena; 16,709	0–2
3	April 20	San Antonio	W 123–115	Julius Erving (39)	Caldwell Jones (12)	Maurice Cheeks (9)	Spectrum; 14,039	1–2
4	April 22	San Antonio	L 112–115	Maurice Cheeks (33)	Steve Mix (9)	Maurice Cheeks (9)	Spectrum; 11,163	1–3
5	April 26	@ San Antonio	W 120–97	Julius Erving (32)	Caldwell Jones (14)	Maurice Cheeks (12)	HemisFair Arena; 16,055	2–3
6	April 29	San Antonio	W 92–90	Caldwell Jones (20)	Caldwell Jones (17)	Maurice Cheeks (6)	Spectrum; 18,276	3–3
7	May 2	@ San Antonio	L 108–111	Julius Erving (34)	Caldwell Jones (14)	Maurice Cheeks (13)	HemisFair Arena; 16,055	3–4

1979 schedule

== Awards and records ==
- Bobby Jones, NBA All-Defensive First Team
