= 1978–79 New Jersey Nets season =

NBA professional basketball team season

- Head coach: Kevin Loughery
- Arena: Rutgers Athletic Center

Results
- Record: 37–45 (.451)
- Place: Division: 3rd (Atlantic); Conference: 6th (Eastern)
- Playoff finish: First round (lost to 76ers 0–2)
- Stats at Basketball Reference

The 1978–79 New Jersey Nets season was the Nets' third season in the NBA.

== Draft picks ==
Round	Pick	Player	Position	Nationality	College
1	13	Winford Boynes	SG/SF	United States	San Francisco
3	45	Mike Phillips	C	United States	Kentucky
3	62	Dave Batton	C	United States	Notre Dame
4	84	Walter Jordan	SF	United States	Purdue
5	89	Cecile Rose		United States	Houston
6	111	Golie Augustus		United States	South Carolina
7	132	Doug Jemison		United States	San Francisco
8	153	Bruce Campbell		United States	Providence
9	171	Frank Sowinski		United States	Princeton
10	187	Michael Vicens		United States	Holy Cross

== Roster ==
1978–79 New Jersey Nets roster
Players

Pos.	No.	Player	Height	Weight	DOB	From
PF	21	Tim Bassett	6 ft 8 in (2.03 m)	225 lb (102 kg)	1951-04-01	Georgia
SG	34	Winford Boynes	6 ft 6 in (1.98 m)	185 lb (84 kg)	1957-05-17	San Francisco
C	40	Harvey Catchings	6 ft 9 in (2.06 m)	218 lb (99 kg)	1951-09-02	Hardin–Simmons
PF	54	Bob Elliott	6 ft 9 in (2.06 m)	225 lb (102 kg)	1955-08-18	Arizona
PF	17	Phil Jackson	6 ft 8 in (2.03 m)	220 lb (100 kg)	1945-09-17	North Dakota
C	52	George Johnson	6 ft 11 in (2.11 m)	205 lb (93 kg)	1948-12-18	Dillard
PG	15	Eddie Jordan	6 ft 1 in (1.85 m)	170 lb (77 kg)	1955-01-29	Rutgers
SF	22	Bernard King	6 ft 7 in (2.01 m)	205 lb (93 kg)	1956-12-04	Tennessee
SG	44	Ralph Simpson	6 ft 5 in (1.96 m)	200 lb (91 kg)	1949-08-10	Michigan State
SF	20	Jan van Breda Kolff	6 ft 7 in (2.01 m)	195 lb (88 kg)	1951-12-16	Vanderbilt
PF	42	Wilson Washington	6 ft 9 in (2.06 m)	227 lb (103 kg)	1955-08-03	Old Dominion
SG	23	John Williamson	6 ft 2 in (1.88 m)	185 lb (84 kg)	1951-11-10	New Mexico State

Coaches
Head coach
- Kevin Loughery
Assistant(s)
- Phil Jackson
- Dave Wohl

Legend
- (DP) Unsigned draft pick
- (FA) Free agent
- (S) Suspended
- Injured

Roster

== Regular season ==
=== Season standings ===
Atlantic Division	W	L	PCT	GB	Home	Road	Div
y-Washington Bullets	54	28	.659	–	31–10	23–18	11–5
x-Philadelphia 76ers	47	35	.573	7	31–10	16–25	9–7
x-New Jersey Nets	37	45	.451	17	25–16	12–29	7–9
New York Knicks	31	51	.378	23	23–18	8–33	7–9
Boston Celtics	29	53	.354	25	21–20	8–33	6–10

#	Eastern Conference				
#	Team	W	L	PCT	GB
1	z-Washington Bullets	54	28	.659	–
2	y-San Antonio Spurs	48	34	.585	6
3	x-Philadelphia 76ers	47	35	.573	7
4	x-Houston Rockets	47	35	.573	7
5	x-Atlanta Hawks	46	36	.561	8
6	x-New Jersey Nets	37	45	.451	17
7	New York Knicks	31	51	.378	23
8	Cleveland Cavaliers	30	52	.366	24
8	Detroit Pistons	30	52	.366	24
10	Boston Celtics	29	53	.354	25
11	New Orleans Jazz	26	56	.317	28

== Game log ==
=== Regular season ===
1978–79 game log
Total: 37–45 (home: 25–16; road: 12–29)
October: 6–4 (home: 4–1; road: 2–3)

Game	Date	Team	Score	High points	High rebounds	High assists	Location Attendance	Record

November: 7–7 (home: 5–2; road: 2–5)

Game	Date	Team	Score	High points	High rebounds	High assists	Location Attendance	Record

December: 4–6 (home: 1–4; road: 3–2)

Game	Date	Team	Score	High points	High rebounds	High assists	Location Attendance	Record

January: 6–7 (home: 3–4; road: 3–3)

Game	Date	Team	Score	High points	High rebounds	High assists	Location Attendance	Record

February: 8–6 (home: 6–1; road: 2–5)

Game	Date	Team	Score	High points	High rebounds	High assists	Location Attendance	Record
All-Star Break

March: 5–10 (home: 5–3; road: 0–7)

Game	Date	Team	Score	High points	High rebounds	High assists	Location Attendance	Record

April: 1–5 (home: 1–1; road: 0–4)

Game	Date	Team	Score	High points	High rebounds	High assists	Location Attendance	Record

1978–79 schedule

== Playoffs ==
1979 playoff game log
First round: 0–2 (home: 0–1; road: 0–1)

Game	Date	Team	Score	High points	High rebounds	High assists	Location Attendance	Series
1	April 11	@ Philadelphia	L 114–122	John Williamson (38)	George Johnson (12)	Eddie Jordan (9)	Spectrum; 8,846	0–1
2	April 13	Philadelphia	L 101–111	Bernard King (27)	van Breda Kolff, Johnson (13)	Eddie Jordan (8)	Rutgers Athletic Center; 9,126	0–2

1979 schedule
