= 1978–79 Detroit Pistons season =

NBA team season

- Head coach: Dick Vitale
- General manager: Bill Davidson
- Owner: Bill Davidson
- Arena: Pontiac Silverdome

Results
- Record: 30–52 (.366)
- Place: Division: 4th (Central); Conference: 9th (Eastern)
- Playoff finish: Did not qualify
- Stats at Basketball Reference

The 1978–79 Detroit Pistons season was the Detroit Pistons' 31st season in the NBA, 22nd season in the metropolitan area of Detroit, first at the Pontiac Silverdome in Pontiac, Michigan, and first in the Eastern Conference.

New Coach Dick Vitale did little to revitalize the direction of the franchise as the team finished with a 30-52 (.366) record, 4th place in the Central Division. Vitale was even hospitalized with stress during the season. The team was led by point guard Kevin Porter, who led the league with 13.4 assists per game, forward M.L. Carr (18.7 ppg, 7.4 rpg), center Bob Lanier (23.6 ppg, 9.3 rpg, NBA All-Star, limited to 53 games due to injury), and the addition of two rookies Vitale drafted from the University of Detroit, where he had coached previously - John Long (16.1 ppg) and Terry Tyler (12.9 ppg, 2.5 blocks per game).

== Draft picks ==
| Round | Pick | Player | Position | Nationality | College |
|---|---|---|---|---|---|
| 2 | 23 | Terry Tyler | G/F | United States | University of Detroit Mercy |
| 2 | 29 | John Long | G/F | United States | University of Detroit Mercy |
| 8 | 157 | Earl Evans | F | United States | University of Nevada, Las Vegas |

== Roster ==
1978-79 Detroit Pistons roster
Players

| Pos. | No. | Player | Height | Weight | DOB | From |
|---|---|---|---|---|---|---|
| PF | 27 | Ron Behagen | 6 ft 9 in (2.06 m) | 185 lb (84 kg) | | Minnesota |
| PG | 42 | Jim Brewer | 6 ft 9 in (2.06 m) | 210 lb (95 kg) | | Minnesota |
| F | 30 | M. L. Carr | 6 ft 6 in (1.98 m) | 205 lb (93 kg) | | Guilford |
| C | 13 | Leon Douglas | 6 ft 10 in (2.08 m) | 230 lb (104 kg) | | Alabama |
| F | 22 | Gus Gerard | 6 ft 8 in (2.03 m) | 205 lb (93 kg) | | Virginia |
| C | 16 | Bob Lanier | 6 ft 11 in (2.11 m) | 250 lb (113 kg) | | St. Bonaventure |
| SG | 25 | John Long | 6 ft 5 in (1.96 m) | 195 lb (88 kg) | | Detroit Mercy |
| C | 50 | Ben Poquette | 6 ft 9 in (2.06 m) | 235 lb (107 kg) | | Central Michigan |
| PG | 1 | Kevin Porter | 6 ft 0 in (1.83 m) | 190 lb (86 kg) | 1950-04-17 | Saint Francis (PA) |
| G/F | 41 | Terry Tyler | 6 ft 7 in (2.01 m) | 215 lb (98 kg) | | Detroit Mercy |

Coaches
Head coach
- Dick Vitale

Legend
- (DP) Unsigned draft pick
- (FA) Free agent
- (S) Suspended
- Injured

== Regular season ==
=== Season standings ===
| Central Division | W | L | PCT | GB | Home | Road | Div |
|---|---|---|---|---|---|---|---|
| y-San Antonio Spurs | 48 | 34 | .585 | – | 29–12 | 19–22 | 11–9 |
| x-Houston Rockets | 47 | 35 | .573 | 1 | 30–11 | 17–24 | 12–8 |
| x-Atlanta Hawks | 46 | 36 | .561 | 2 | 34–7 | 12–29 | 14–6 |
| Cleveland Cavaliers | 30 | 52 | .366 | 18 | 20–21 | 10–31 | 6–14 |
| Detroit Pistons | 30 | 52 | .366 | 18 | 22–19 | 8–33 | 9–11 |
| New Orleans Jazz | 26 | 56 | .317 | 22 | 21–20 | 8–33 | 9–15 |

| # | Eastern Conference | | | | |
| # | Team | W | L | PCT | GB |
|---|---|---|---|---|---|
| 1 | z-Washington Bullets | 54 | 28 | .659 | – |
| 2 | y-San Antonio Spurs | 48 | 34 | .585 | 6 |
| 3 | x-Philadelphia 76ers | 47 | 35 | .573 | 7 |
| 4 | x-Houston Rockets | 47 | 35 | .573 | 7 |
| 5 | x-Atlanta Hawks | 46 | 36 | .561 | 8 |
| 6 | x-New Jersey Nets | 37 | 45 | .451 | 17 |
| 7 | New York Knicks | 31 | 51 | .378 | 23 |
| 8 | Cleveland Cavaliers | 30 | 52 | .366 | 24 |
| 8 | Detroit Pistons | 30 | 52 | .366 | 24 |
| 10 | Boston Celtics | 29 | 53 | .354 | 25 |
| 11 | New Orleans Jazz | 26 | 56 | .317 | 28 |

z - clinched division title
y - clinched division title
x - clinched playoff spot

== Awards and records ==
- M. L. Carr, NBA All-Defensive Second Team
- Terry Tyler, NBA All-Rookie Team 1st Team
