= 1978–79 New Orleans Jazz season =

NBA professional basketball team season

- Head coach: Elgin Baylor
- Arena: Louisiana Superdome

Results
- Record: 26–56 (.317)
- Place: Division: 6th (Central); Conference: 11th (Eastern)
- Playoff finish: Did not qualify
- Stats at Basketball Reference

Local media
- Television: WGNO
- Radio: WWL

The 1978–79 New Orleans Jazz season was their fifth season in the NBA and its last in New Orleans. The Jazz averaged 108.3 points per game (ranked 15th in NBA) while allowing an average of 114.6 points per game (ranked 21st in NBA). The attendance was 364,205 (ranked 18th in NBA).

== Draft picks ==
Round	Pick	Player	Position	Nationality	College
1	11	James Hardy		United States	San Francisco

== Roster ==
1978–79 New Orleans Jazz roster
Players

Pos.	No.	Player	Height	Weight	DOB	From
F	12	Marty Byrnes	6 ft 7 in (2.01 m)	215 lb (98 kg)	1956-04-30	Syracuse
G	25	Gail Goodrich	6 ft 1 in (1.85 m)	170 lb (77 kg)		UCLA
F/C	30	Paul Griffin	6 ft 9 in (2.06 m)	205 lb (93 kg)		Western Michigan
PF	11	James Hardy	6 ft 8 in (2.03 m)	220 lb (100 kg)	1956–12–01	San Francisco
F	24	Spencer Haywood	6 ft 8 in (2.03 m)	225 lb (102 kg)	1949-04-22	Detroit Mercy
F	23	Aaron James	6 ft 8 in (2.03 m)	210 lb (95 kg)		Grambling State
C	53	Rich Kelley	7 ft 0 in (2.13 m)	235 lb (107 kg)		Stanford
G	18	Ron Lee	6 ft 4 in (1.93 m)	193 lb (88 kg)	1952-11-02	Oregon
G	7	Pete Maravich	6 ft 5 in (1.96 m)	197 lb (89 kg)		LSU
G	33	Jim McElroy	6 ft 3 in (1.91 m)	190 lb (86 kg)		Central Michigan

Coaches
Head coach
- Elgin Baylor
Assistant(s)
- Bill Bertka

Legend
- (DP) Unsigned draft pick
- (FA) Free agent
- (S) Suspended
- Injured

== Regular season ==
=== Season standings ===
Central Division	W	L	PCT	GB	Home	Road	Div
y-San Antonio Spurs	48	34	.585	–	29–12	19–22	11–9
x-Houston Rockets	47	35	.573	1	30–11	17–24	12–8
x-Atlanta Hawks	46	36	.561	2	34–7	12–29	14–6
Cleveland Cavaliers	30	52	.366	18	20–21	10–31	6–14
Detroit Pistons	30	52	.366	18	22–19	8–33	9–11
New Orleans Jazz	26	56	.317	22	21–20	8–33	9–15

#	Eastern Conference				
#	Team	W	L	PCT	GB
1	z-Washington Bullets	54	28	.659	–
2	y-San Antonio Spurs	48	34	.585	6
3	x-Philadelphia 76ers	47	35	.573	7
4	x-Houston Rockets	47	35	.573	7
5	x-Atlanta Hawks	46	36	.561	8
6	x-New Jersey Nets	37	45	.451	17
7	New York Knicks	31	51	.378	23
8	Cleveland Cavaliers	30	52	.366	24
8	Detroit Pistons	30	52	.366	24
10	Boston Celtics	29	53	.354	25
11	New Orleans Jazz	26	56	.317	28

== Playoffs ==
The Jazz missed the playoffs for the fifth straight season.

== Player stats ==
Note: GP= Games played; REB= Rebounds; AST= Assists; STL = Steals; BLK = Blocks; PTS = Points; AVG = Average

Player	GP	REB	AST	STL	BLK	PTS
Jim McElroy	79	215	453	148	49	1337
Rich Kelley	80	1026	285	126	166	1253
Pete Maravich	79	422	488	120	18	1700
Truck Robinson	43	577	74	29	63	1039
Gail Goodrich	74	183	357	90	13	938
Spencer Haywood	34	327	71	30	53	816
Aaron James	73	248	78	28	21	727
James Hardy	68	310	65	52	61	453
Paul Griffin	77	391	138	54	36	303
Tommie Green	59	68	140	61	6	232
Joe C. Meriweather	36	184	31	17	41	219
Marty Byrnes	36	94	43	12	8	189
Ira Terrell	31	109	26	15	22	153
Ron Lee	17	55	73	38	2	114
Gus Bailey	2	2	2	0	0	4

== Relocation to Utah ==
By 1979, the Jazz were sinking under the weight of $5 million in losses over five years. Original owner Sam Battistone decided to move to Salt Lake City, even though it was a smaller market than New Orleans at the time. However, Salt Lake City had proven it could support a pro basketball team when it played host to the American Basketball Association's Utah Stars from 1970 to 1976.

Professional basketball returned to New Orleans, when the Charlotte Hornets relocated there, in 2002. The team became the Pelicans in 2013 season, and the 1988-2002 history of the Hornets returned to the Bobcats, who reinstated the Hornets name prior to the 2014–15 season.
