= 1978–79 Atlanta Hawks season =

NBA professional basketball team season

- Head coach: Hubie Brown
- Arena: Omni Coliseum

Results
- Record: 46–36 (.561)
- Place: Division: 3rd (Central); Conference: 5th (Eastern)
- Playoff finish: East Conference Semifinals (Eliminated 3-4)
- Stats at Basketball Reference

Local media
- Television: WTCG
- Radio: WSB

The 1978–79 Atlanta Hawks season was the Hawks' 30th season in the NBA and 11th season in Atlanta.

== Roster ==
Atlanta Hawks roster
Players

Pos.	No.	Player	Height	Weight	DOB	From
G	14	Charlie Criss	5 ft 8 in (1.73 m)	165 lb (75 kg)		New Mexico State
G	22	John Drew	6 ft 6 in (1.98 m)	205 lb (93 kg)		Gardner–Webb
SG	25	Terry Furlow	6 ft 4 in (1.93 m)	190 lb (86 kg)	October 18, 1954	Michigan State
F	21	Jack Givens	6 ft 5 in (1.96 m)	205 lb (93 kg)		Kentucky
C	10	Steve Hawes	6 ft 9 in (2.06 m)	220 lb (100 kg)		Washington
G	33	Keith Herron	6 ft 6 in (1.98 m)	195 lb (88 kg)		Villanova
G	24	Armond Hill	6 ft 4 in (1.93 m)	190 lb (86 kg)		Princeton
G	3	Eddie Johnson	6 ft 2 in (1.88 m)	180 lb (82 kg)		Auburn
C	54	Tom McMillen	6 ft 11 in (2.11 m)	215 lb (98 kg)		Maryland
C	30	Tree Rollins	7 ft 1 in (2.16 m)	235 lb (107 kg)		Clemson
F	32	Dan Roundfield	6 ft 8 in (2.03 m)	205 lb (93 kg)		Central Michigan
G	42	Rick Wilson	6 ft 5 in (1.96 m)	200 lb (91 kg)		Louisville

Coaches
Head coach
- Hubie Brown

Legend
- (DP) Unsigned draft pick
- (FA) Free agent
- (S) Suspended
- Injured

== Regular season ==
=== Season standings ===
Central Division	W	L	PCT	GB	Home	Road	Div
y-San Antonio Spurs	48	34	.585	–	29–12	19–22	11–9
x-Houston Rockets	47	35	.573	1	30–11	17–24	12–8
x-Atlanta Hawks	46	36	.561	2	34–7	12–29	14–6
Cleveland Cavaliers	30	52	.366	18	20–21	10–31	6–14
Detroit Pistons	30	52	.366	18	22–19	8–33	9–11
New Orleans Jazz	26	56	.317	22	21–20	8–33	9–15

#	Eastern Conference				
#	Team	W	L	PCT	GB
1	z-Washington Bullets	54	28	.659	–
2	y-San Antonio Spurs	48	34	.585	6
3	x-Philadelphia 76ers	47	35	.573	7
4	x-Houston Rockets	47	35	.573	7
5	x-Atlanta Hawks	46	36	.561	8
6	x-New Jersey Nets	37	45	.451	17
7	New York Knicks	31	51	.378	23
8	Cleveland Cavaliers	30	52	.366	24
8	Detroit Pistons	30	52	.366	24
10	Boston Celtics	29	53	.354	25
11	New Orleans Jazz	26	56	.317	28

z - clinched division title
y - clinched division title
x - clinched playoff spot

== Playoffs ==
1979 playoff game log
First Round: 2–0 (home: 1–0; road: 1–0)

Game	Date	Team	Score	High points	High rebounds	High assists	Location Attendance	Series
1	April 11	@ Houston	W 109–106	Dan Roundfield (23)	Dan Roundfield (18)	Hawes, Criss (4)	The Summit; 14,405	1–0
2	April 13	Houston	W 100–91	Drew, Johnson (25)	John Drew (13)	Eddie Johnson (8)	Omni Coliseum; 15,798	2–0

Conference Semifinals: 3–4 (home: 1–2; road: 2–2)

Game	Date	Team	Score	High points	High rebounds	High assists	Location Attendance	Series
1	April 15	@ Washington	L 89–103	Dan Roundfield (24)	Dan Roundfield (10)	Armond Hill (8)	Capital Centre; 15,721	0–1
2	April 17	@ Washington	W 107–99	Roundfield, Johnson (17)	Tree Rollins (8)	Armond Hill (6)	Capital Centre; 19,035	1–1
3	April 20	Washington	L 77–89	John Drew (13)	Roundfield, Rollins (14)	Armond Hill (5)	Omni Coliseum; 15,798	1–2
4	April 22	Washington	L 115–120 (OT)	Dan Roundfield (22)	Dan Roundfield (18)	Dan Roundfield (7)	Omni Coliseum; 15,798	1–3
5	April 24	@ Washington	W 107–103	Terry Furlow (21)	Dan Roundfield (14)	Armond Hill (5)	Capital Centre; 19,035	2–3
6	April 26	Washington	W 104–86	Drew, Johnson (22)	Steve Hawes (14)	Armond Hill (9)	Omni Coliseum; 15,978	3–3
7	April 29	@ Washington	L 94–100	John Drew (24)	John Drew (8)	Eddie Johnson (6)	Capital Centre; 19,035	3–4

1979 schedule

== Awards and records ==
- "Fast Eddie" Johnson, NBA All-Defensive Second Team
