= 1978–79 Boston Celtics season =

NBA basketball team season

- Head coach: Tom Sanders (fired); Dave Cowens
- General manager: Red Auerbach
- Owners: John Y. Brown Jr.; Harry T. Mangurian Jr.
- Arena: Boston Garden; Hartford Civic Center

Results
- Record: 29–53 (.354)
- Place: Division: 5th (Atlantic); Conference: 10th (Eastern)
- Playoff finish: Did not qualify
- Stats at Basketball Reference

Local media
- Television: WBZ-TV
- Radio: WBZ

The 1978–79 Boston Celtics season was the 33rd season of the Boston Celtics in the National Basketball Association (NBA). It was the worst record of any Celtics team that played between 1950 and 1996.

Prior to the season, owner Irv Levin swapped franchises with the Buffalo Braves ownership group led by John Y. Brown, Jr. Levin had wanted to have a team in his native California, but knew the other league owners would not consider a move of the Celtics. He therefore brokered a deal with Brown to swap franchises, and then moved the Braves to San Diego to become the Clippers. In the meantime, a deal was brokered, without consulting team president Red Auerbach, to trade three players (Freeman Williams, Kevin Kunnert and Kermit Washington) to the Braves for Tiny Archibald, Billy Knight and Marvin Barnes. The move created a media firestorm for the team, as Kunnert and Washington were viewed as keys to future improvement, and Auerbach publicly stated that he was not consulted about the move. Brown would then trade three first-round draft picks for former Brave Bob McAdoo. Auerbach again was not consulted, and he almost took a job with the rival New York Knicks because of it. By the start of the season, between trades and the retirement of team captain John Havlicek, only six players remained from the 1977–78 team, including the starting front three of Dave Cowens, Cedric Maxwell and Curtis Rowe, shooting guard Jo Jo White and backup point guards Don Chaney and Kevin Stacom. Team depth issues were worsened when first round draft pick Larry Bird decided to remain in college for the season.

Following the season, Brown would sell his portion of the team to partner Harry T. Mangurian, Jr. Brown would subsequently be elected Governor of his native Kentucky later that year. This was the last time the Celtics would miss the playoffs until the 1993-94 season.

== Draft picks ==
Round	Pick	Player	Position	Nationality	College
1	6	Larry Bird	SF/PF	United States	Indiana State
2	30	Jeff Judkins	SF	United States	Utah

== Roster ==
1978–79 Boston Celtics roster
Players

Pos.	No.	Player	Height	Weight	DOB	From
G	7	Nate Archibald	6 ft 1 in (1.85 m)	150 lb (68 kg)		UTEP
G	12	Don Chaney	6 ft 5 in (1.96 m)	210 lb (95 kg)		Houston
C	18	Dave Cowens	6 ft 9 in (2.06 m)	230 lb (104 kg)		Florida State
G	42	Chris Ford	6 ft 5 in (1.96 m)	190 lb (86 kg)		Villanova
F	32	Jeff Judkins	6 ft 6 in (1.98 m)	185 lb (84 kg)		Utah
F	31	Cedric Maxwell	6 ft 8 in (2.03 m)	205 lb (93 kg)		Charlotte
F/C	11	Bob McAdoo	6 ft 9 in (2.06 m)	210 lb (95 kg)		North Carolina
C	53	Rick Robey	6 ft 11 in (2.11 m)	230 lb (104 kg)		Kentucky
F	41	Curtis Rowe	6 ft 7 in (2.01 m)	225 lb (102 kg)		UCLA
F	45	Frankie Sanders	6 ft 6 in (1.98 m)	200 lb (91 kg)		Southern
G	27	Kevin Stacom	6 ft 3 in (1.91 m)	185 lb (84 kg)		Providence

Coaches
Head coach
- Tom Sanders (fired)
- Dave Cowens
Assistant(s)
- K. C. Jones
- Bob MacKinnon

Legend
- (DP) Unsigned draft pick
- (FA) Free agent
- (S) Suspended
- Injured

Roster
Updated: February 12, 1979

== Regular season ==
=== Season standings ===
Atlantic Division	W	L	PCT	GB	Home	Road	Div
y-Washington Bullets	54	28	.659	–	31–10	23–18	11–5
x-Philadelphia 76ers	47	35	.573	7	31–10	16–25	9–7
x-New Jersey Nets	37	45	.451	17	25–16	12–29	7–9
New York Knicks	31	51	.378	23	23–18	8–33	7–9
Boston Celtics	29	53	.354	25	21–20	8–33	6–10

#	Eastern Conference				
#	Team	W	L	PCT	GB
1	z-Washington Bullets	54	28	.659	–
2	y-San Antonio Spurs	48	34	.585	6
3	x-Philadelphia 76ers	47	35	.573	7
4	x-Houston Rockets	47	35	.573	7
5	x-Atlanta Hawks	46	36	.561	8
6	x-New Jersey Nets	37	45	.451	17
7	New York Knicks	31	51	.378	23
8	Cleveland Cavaliers	30	52	.366	24
8	Detroit Pistons	30	52	.366	24
10	Boston Celtics	29	53	.354	25
11	New Orleans Jazz	26	56	.317	28
