= 1978–79 Houston Rockets season =

- Head coach: Tom Nissalke
- General manager: Ray Patterson
- Owner: Kenneth Schnitzer
- Arena: The Summit

Results
- Record: 47–35 (.573)
- Place: Division: 2nd (Central); Conference: 4th (Eastern)
- Playoff finish: East First Round (lost to Hawks 0–2)
- Stats at Basketball Reference

Local media
- Television: KHTV
- Radio: KTRH

The 1978–79 Houston Rockets season was the Rockets' 12th season in the NBA and 8th season in the city of Houston.

In the playoffs, the Rockets were swept by the Atlanta Hawks in two games in the First Round.

On the radio, Rockets games began to be broadcast on KTRH after two seasons on KXYZ.

== Roster ==
Houston Rockets roster
Players

Pos.	No.	Player	Height	Weight	DOB	From
F	4	Rick Barry	6 ft 7 in (2.01 m)	205 lb (93 kg)		Miami (FL)
F	22	Alonzo Bradley	6 ft 6 in (1.98 m)	190 lb (86 kg)		Texas Southern
G	10	Mike Dunleavy	6 ft 1 in (1.85 m)	180 lb (82 kg)		South Carolina
C	24	Moses Malone	6 ft 11 in (2.11 m)	235 lb (107 kg)		Petersburg High School
G	23	Calvin Murphy	5 ft 9 in (1.75 m)	165 lb (75 kg)		Niagara
G	14	Mike Newlin	6 ft 4 in (1.93 m)	200 lb (91 kg)		Utah
F	50	Robert Reid	6 ft 8 in (2.03 m)	205 lb (93 kg)		Saint Mary's
F	45	Rudy Tomjanovich	6 ft 8 in (2.03 m)	218 lb (99 kg)		Michigan

Coaches
Head coach
- Tom Nissalke

Legend
- (DP) Unsigned draft pick
- (FA) Free agent
- (S) Suspended
- Injured

== Regular season ==
=== Season standings ===
Central Division	W	L	PCT	GB	Home	Road	Div
y-San Antonio Spurs	48	34	.585	–	29–12	19–22	11–9
x-Houston Rockets	47	35	.573	1	30–11	17–24	12–8
x-Atlanta Hawks	46	36	.561	2	34–7	12–29	14–6
Cleveland Cavaliers	30	52	.366	18	20–21	10–31	6–14
Detroit Pistons	30	52	.366	18	22–19	8–33	9–11
New Orleans Jazz	26	56	.317	22	21–20	8–33	9–15

#	Eastern Conference				
#	Team	W	L	PCT	GB
1	z-Washington Bullets	54	28	.659	–
2	y-San Antonio Spurs	48	34	.585	6
3	x-Philadelphia 76ers	47	35	.573	7
4	x-Houston Rockets	47	35	.573	7
5	x-Atlanta Hawks	46	36	.561	8
6	x-New Jersey Nets	37	45	.451	17
7	New York Knicks	31	51	.378	23
8	Cleveland Cavaliers	30	52	.366	24
8	Detroit Pistons	30	52	.366	24
10	Boston Celtics	29	53	.354	25
11	New Orleans Jazz	26	56	.317	28

z – clinched division title
y – clinched division title
x – clinched playoff spot

== Playoffs ==
1979 playoff game log
First Round: 0–2 (home: 0–1; road: 0–1)

Game	Date	Team	Score	High points	High rebounds	High assists	Location Attendance	Series
1	April 11	Atlanta	L 106–109	Moses Malone (28)	Moses Malone (17)	Slick Watts (7)	The Summit; 14,405	0–1
2	April 13	@ Atlanta	L 91–100	Moses Malone (21)	Moses Malone (24)	Calvin Murphy (4)	Omni Coliseum; 15,798	0–2

1979 schedule

== Awards and records ==
- Moses Malone, NBA Most Valuable Player Award
- Moses Malone, All-NBA First Team
- Moses Malone, NBA All-Defensive Second Team
