= Zollie Volchok =

American basketball executive

Zalmon Marcola "Zollie" Volchok (September 22, 1916 – February 26, 2012) was the general manager of the Seattle SuperSonics of the National Basketball Association.

Volchok was born in Salem, Oregon and graduated from the University of Oregon in 1939. His parents were Russian-Jewish immigrants. Volchok served in the United States Navy during World War II. In the early 1950s, he started a film distribution company in Seattle that later became Northwest Releasing, a booking company for theatrical shows, musical performances (such as The Beatles' first Seattle appearance in 1964, The Rat Pack, Bill Cosby, and Elvis Presley) and closed-circuit broadcasts of athletic contests.

Volchok's success with Northwest Releasing led SuperSonics owner Sam Schulman to offer him a position as general manager of the team. Volchok concentrated on marketing and promoting the SuperSonics, bringing live and recorded music into the Seattle Center Coliseum, creating halftime shows, and introducing kids' nights, ladies' nights, and seniors' nights.

Volchok was manager when the SuperSonics won the NBA championship in 1979 and won the 1983 NBA Executive of the Year Award. In 1983, Volchok's involvement with the SuperSonics ended when Schulman sold it.

Volchok died in 2012 of pneumonia at the age of 95.
