= 1978–79 NBA season =

Basketball season

- League: National Basketball Association
- Sport: Basketball
- Duration: October 13, 1978 – April 8, 1979; April 10 – May 18, 1979 (Playoffs); May 20 – June 1, 1979 (Finals)
- Games: 82
- Teams: 22
- TV partner: CBS

Draft
- Top draft pick: Mychal Thompson
- Picked by: Portland Trail Blazers

Regular season
- Top seed: Washington Bullets
- Season MVP: Moses Malone (Houston)
- Top scorer: George Gervin (San Antonio)

Playoffs
- Eastern champions: Washington Bullets
- Eastern runners-up: San Antonio Spurs
- Western champions: Seattle SuperSonics
- Western runners-up: Phoenix Suns

Finals
- Champions: Seattle SuperSonics
- Runners-up: Washington Bullets
- Finals MVP: Dennis Johnson (Seattle)

NBA seasons
- ← 1977–78 1979–80 →

The 1978–79 NBA season was the 33rd season of the National Basketball Association. The season ended with the Seattle SuperSonics winning the NBA championship, beating the Washington Bullets 4 games to 1 in the NBA Finals, a rematch of the previous year's Finals with the opposite result.

== Notable occurrences ==
- The Buffalo Braves moved from Buffalo, New York to San Diego, California and became the San Diego Clippers, shifting from the Atlantic Division of the Eastern Conference to the Pacific Division of the Western Conference.
- The Detroit Pistons changed conferences, moving from the Midwest Division of the Western Conference to the Central Division of the Eastern Conference, where they remain today.
- The Washington Bullets shifted from the Central Division to the Atlantic Division. The franchise also won its last division title until the 2016–17 season.
- The NBA adopted a three-official system similar to the one used in college basketball (but not used in the NCAA Division I men's basketball tournament until 1979) on a one-year trial basis. The experiment was scrapped for the 1979–80 season, but returned permanently in 1988–89.
- The 1979 NBA All-Star Game was played at the Pontiac Silverdome in Pontiac, Michigan, with the West defeating the East 134–129 in overtime. David Thompson of the Denver Nuggets won the game's MVP award.
- This season saw the rookie debuts of Michael Ray Richardson, Maurice Cheeks, Reggie Theus and Michael Cooper.
- The Jazz played their final season in New Orleans, Louisiana, before moving to Salt Lake City. It would be 23 years before New Orleans received another NBA franchise.
- The Los Angeles Lakers played their final season under the ownership of Jack Kent Cooke.
- For the last time until 2018, both conference finals went to a deciding Game 7.
- The Philadelphia 76ers and the New Jersey Nets replayed, on March 23, the last 17 minutes and 50 seconds of a November 8 game that had been protested by the Nets because the referee had allowed three technical fouls (and subsequent free throws) to be called on Nets coach Kevin Loughery and player Bernard King. Before the replay took place, the 76ers and Nets had traded players and Eric Money became the only NBA player to score for both teams in the same game, having 23 points for the Nets in November and 4 for the 76ers in March.
- The Seattle SuperSonics won their first NBA championship in a revenge-win over the Washington Bullets. No team from the NBA's Northwest Division, to which the Sonics relocated in 2004, had won the NBA championship since until the Denver Nuggets in 2023. This ended what was the longest divisional championship drought in any of the major American sport leagues, at 44 years.
- The 1979 NBA Finals would be the last until 1990 not to feature the Los Angeles Lakers or Boston Celtics. Since 1979, the Washington Bullets franchise, who appeared in four NBA finals between 1971 and 1979, have never again made the NBA Finals, or even Conference Finals. The Sonics would challenge for the NBA title again in 1996, but relocated to Oklahoma City in 2008. Therefore, the 1979 title will remain the city of Seattle's only NBA championship unless they receive another franchise.

Coaching changes
Offseason
Team	1977–78 coach	1978–79 coach
Buffalo Braves/San Diego Clippers	Cotton Fitzsimmons	Gene Shue
Chicago Bulls	Ed Badger	Larry Costello; Scotty Robertson
Detroit Pistons	Bob Kauffman	Dick Vitale
Kansas City Kings	Larry Staverman	Cotton Fitzsimmons
In-season
Team	Outgoing coach	Incoming coach
Boston Celtics	Satch Sanders	Dave Cowens
Chicago Bulls	Larry Costello	Scotty Robertson
Denver Nuggets	Larry Brown	Donnie Walsh
New York Knicks	Willis Reed	Red Holzman

== Final standings ==
=== By division ===
Atlantic Division	W	L	PCT	GB	Home	Road	Div
y-Washington Bullets	54	28	.659	–	31–10	23–18	11–5
x-Philadelphia 76ers	47	35	.573	7	31–10	16–25	9–7
x-New Jersey Nets	37	45	.451	17	25–16	12–29	7–9
New York Knicks	31	51	.378	23	23–18	8–33	7–9
Boston Celtics	29	53	.354	25	21–20	8–33	6–10

Central Division	W	L	PCT	GB	Home	Road	Div
y-San Antonio Spurs	48	34	.585	–	29–12	19–22	11–9
x-Houston Rockets	47	35	.573	1	30–11	17–24	12–8
x-Atlanta Hawks	46	36	.561	2	34–7	12–29	14–6
Cleveland Cavaliers	30	52	.366	18	20–21	10–31	6–14
Detroit Pistons	30	52	.366	18	22–19	8–33	9–11
New Orleans Jazz	26	56	.317	22	21–20	8–33	9–15

Midwest Division	W	L	PCT	GB	Home	Road	Div
y-Kansas City Kings	48	34	.585	–	32–9	16–25	12–4
x-Denver Nuggets	47	35	.573	1	29–12	18–23	8–8
Indiana Pacers	38	44	.463	10	25–16	13–28	6–10
Milwaukee Bucks	38	44	.463	10	28–13	10–31	9–7
Chicago Bulls	31	51	.378	17	19–22	12–29	5–11

Pacific Division	W	L	PCT	GB	Home	Road	Div
y-Seattle SuperSonics	52	30	.634	–	31–10	21–20	11–9
x-Phoenix Suns	50	32	.610	2	32–9	18–23	11–9
x-Los Angeles Lakers	47	35	.573	5	31–10	16–25	11–9
x-Portland Trail Blazers	45	37	.549	7	33–8	12–29	8–12
San Diego Clippers	43	39	.524	9	29–12	14–27	11–9
Golden State Warriors	38	44	.463	14	23–18	15–26	8–12

=== By conference ===
#	Eastern Conference				
#	Team	W	L	PCT	GB
1	z-Washington Bullets	54	28	.659	–
2	y-San Antonio Spurs	48	34	.585	6
3	x-Philadelphia 76ers	47	35	.573	7
4	x-Houston Rockets	47	35	.573	7
5	x-Atlanta Hawks	46	36	.561	8
6	x-New Jersey Nets	37	45	.451	17
7	New York Knicks	31	51	.378	23
8	Cleveland Cavaliers	30	52	.366	24
8	Detroit Pistons	30	52	.366	24
10	Boston Celtics	29	53	.354	25
11	New Orleans Jazz	26	56	.317	28

#	Western Conference				
#	Team	W	L	PCT	GB
1	z-Seattle SuperSonics	52	30	.634	–
2	y-Kansas City Kings	48	34	.585	4
3	x-Phoenix Suns	50	32	.610	2
4	x-Denver Nuggets	47	35	.573	5
5	x-Los Angeles Lakers	47	35	.573	5
6	x-Portland Trail Blazers	45	37	.549	7
7	San Diego Clippers	43	39	.524	9
8	Indiana Pacers	38	44	.463	14
9	Milwaukee Bucks	38	44	.463	14
10	Golden State Warriors	38	44	.463	14
11	Chicago Bulls	31	51	.378	21

Notes

- z, y – division champions
- x – clinched playoff spot

== Playoffs ==
Teams in bold advanced to the next round. The numbers to the left of each team indicate the team's seeding in its conference, and the numbers to the right indicate the number of games the team won in that round. The division champions are marked by an asterisk. Home court advantage does not necessarily belong to the higher-seeded team, but instead the team with the better regular season record; teams enjoying the home advantage are shown in italics.

First Round
E4	Houston	0
**E5**	**Atlanta**	**2**
**E3**	**Philadelphia**	**2**
E6	New Jersey	0
W4	Denver	1
**W5**	**Los Angeles**	**2**
**W3**	**Phoenix**	**2**
W6	Portland	1

Conference Semifinals
**E1**	**Washington***	**4**
E5	Atlanta	3
**Eastern Conference**
E3	Philadelphia	3
**E2**	**San Antonio***	**4**
**W1**	**Seattle***	**4**
W5	Los Angeles	1
**Western Conference**
**W3**	**Phoenix**	4
W2	Kansas City*	1

Conference Finals
**E1**	**Washington***	**4**
E2	San Antonio*	3
**W1**	**Seattle***	**4**
W3	Phoenix	3

NBA Finals
E1	Washington*	1
**W1**	**Seattle***	**4**

- * Division winner
- **Bold** Series winner
- Italic Team with home-court advantage

== Statistics leaders ==
Category	Player	Team	Stat
Points per game	George Gervin	San Antonio Spurs	29.6
Rebounds per game	Moses Malone	Houston Rockets	17.6
Assists per game	Kevin Porter	Detroit Pistons	13.4
Steals per game	M.L. Carr	Detroit Pistons	2.46
Blocks per game	Kareem Abdul-Jabbar	Los Angeles Lakers	3.95
FG%	Cedric Maxwell	Boston Celtics	.584
FT%	Rick Barry	Houston Rockets	.947

== NBA awards ==
- Most Valuable Player: Moses Malone, Houston Rockets
- Rookie of the Year: Phil Ford, Kansas City Kings
- Coach of the Year: Cotton Fitzsimmons, Kansas City Kings

- All-NBA First Team:
  - G – Paul Westphal, Phoenix Suns
  - G – George Gervin, San Antonio Spurs
  - C – Moses Malone, Houston Rockets
  - F – Marques Johnson, Milwaukee Bucks
  - F – Elvin Hayes, Washington Bullets
- All-NBA Second Team:
  - F – Walter Davis, Phoenix Suns
  - F – Bob Dandridge, Washington Bullets
  - C – Kareem Abdul-Jabbar, Los Angeles Lakers
  - G – Lloyd Free, San Diego Clippers
  - G – Phil Ford, Kansas City Kings

- All-NBA Rookie Team:
  - Mychal Thompson, Portland Trail Blazers
  - Terry Tyler, Detroit Pistons
  - Ron Brewer, Portland Trail Blazers
  - Reggie Theus, Chicago Bulls
  - Phil Ford, Kansas City Kings

- NBA All-Defensive First Team:
  - Bobby Jones, Philadelphia 76ers
  - Bobby Dandridge, Washington Bullets
  - Kareem Abdul-Jabbar, Los Angeles Lakers
  - Dennis Johnson, Seattle SuperSonics
  - Don Buse, Phoenix Suns
- NBA All-Defensive Second Team:
  - Maurice Lucas, Portland Trail Blazers
  - M. L. Carr, Detroit Pistons
  - Moses Malone, Houston Rockets
  - Lionel Hollins, Portland Trail Blazers
  - Eddie Johnson, Atlanta Hawks

== See also ==
- List of NBA regular season records
