= 1978–79 Phoenix Suns season =

Professional basketball season

- Head coach: John MacLeod
- General manager: Jerry Colangelo
- Owners: Karl Eller, Don Pitt, Don Diamond, Bhavik Darji, Marvin Meyer, Richard L. Bloch
- Arena: Arizona Veterans Memorial Coliseum

Results
- Record: 50–32 (.610)
- Place: Division: 2nd (Pacific); Conference: 3rd (Western)
- Playoff finish: Conference finals (lost to SuperSonics 3–4)
- Stats at Basketball Reference

Local media
- Television: KTAR-TV
- Radio: KTAR

The 1978–79 Phoenix Suns season was the 11th season for the Phoenix Suns of the National Basketball Association and the first time they reached the 50-win mark to end the regular season. The team repeated a second-place finish in an expanded Pacific division and the Western Conference's second-best record, thus earning a spot in the playoffs, the franchise's first time extending the season in back-to-back seasons. For the first time since the '75–'76 team, the Suns returned to the Western Conference finals, before being dispatched by Pacific division champion Seattle in seven games. The Suns were led by head coach John MacLeod and played all home games in Arizona Veterans Memorial Coliseum.

Paul Westphal, whom led the Suns with his 24 points per game, made his third straight appearance in the All-Star Game and was again named to the All-NBA First Team. Walter Davis followed up his Rookie of the Year Award performance from the previous season with his second consecutive All-Star selection and by season's end, voted to the All-NBA Second Team. Fourth-year big man Alvan Adams hauled in a career-high 9.2 rebounds a game to go with an average of 17.8 points.

== Offseason ==
=== NBA draft ===
Round	Pick	Player	Position	Nationality	College
1	19	Marty Byrnes	Forward	United States	Syracuse
3	63	Joel Kramer	Forward	United States	San Diego State
4	85	Bob Miller	Center	United States	Cincinnati
4	88	Wayne Smith	Guard	United States	California-Irvine
5	107	Andre Wakefield	Guard	United States	Loyola (IL)
6	128	Charles Thompson	Forward	United States	Houston
7	149	Steve Malovic	Center	United States	San Diego State
8	167	George Fowler	Center	United States	Pacific
9	184	Nate Stokes	Forward	United States	Grand Canyon
10	199	Lewis Cohen	Guard	United States	Cal Poly

== Roster ==
1978–79 Phoenix Suns roster
Players

Pos.	No.	Player	Height	Weight	DOB	From
F/C	33	Alvan Adams	6 ft 9 in (2.06 m)	210 lb (95 kg)	1954-07-19	Oklahoma
PG	23	Mike Bratz	6 ft 2 in (1.88 m)	185 lb (84 kg)	1955-10-17	Stanford
G	10	Don Buse	6 ft 4 in (1.93 m)	190 lb (86 kg)	1950-08-10	Evansville
G/F	6	Walter Davis	6 ft 6 in (1.98 m)	193 lb (88 kg)	1954-09-09	North Carolina
C	35	Bayard Forrest	6 ft 10 in (2.08 m)	235 lb (107 kg)	1954-07-08	Grand Canyon
PF	24	Garfield Heard	6 ft 6 in (1.98 m)	219 lb (99 kg)	1948-05-03	Oklahoma
F/C	50	Joel Kramer	6 ft 7 in (2.01 m)	203 lb (92 kg)	1955-11-30	San Diego State
G	12	Ted McClain	6 ft 1 in (1.85 m)	180 lb (82 kg)	1946-08-30	Tennessee State
PF	21	Leonard Robinson	6 ft 7 in (2.01 m)	225 lb (102 kg)	1951-10-04	Tennessee State
SF	14	Alvin Scott	6 ft 7 in (2.01 m)	185 lb (84 kg)	1955-09-14	Oral Roberts
G	44	Paul Westphal	6 ft 4 in (1.93 m)	195 lb (88 kg)	1950-11-30	USC

Coaches
Head coach
- (United States) John MacLeod (Bellarmine)
Assistant(s)
- (United States) Al Bianchi (Bowling Green)

Legend
- (DP) Unsigned draft pick
- (FA) Free agent
- (S) Suspended
- Injured

== Regular season ==
=== Standings ===
Pacific Division	W	L	PCT	GB	Home	Road	Div
y-Seattle SuperSonics	52	30	.634	–	31–10	21–20	11–9
x-Phoenix Suns	50	32	.610	2	32–9	18–23	11–9
x-Los Angeles Lakers	47	35	.573	5	31–10	16–25	11–9
x-Portland Trail Blazers	45	37	.549	7	33–8	12–29	8–12
San Diego Clippers	43	39	.524	9	29–12	14–27	11–9
Golden State Warriors	38	44	.463	14	23–18	15–26	8–12

#	Western Conference				
#	Team	W	L	PCT	GB
1	z-Seattle SuperSonics	52	30	.634	–
2	y-Kansas City Kings	48	34	.585	4
3	x-Phoenix Suns	50	32	.610	2
4	x-Denver Nuggets	47	35	.573	5
5	x-Los Angeles Lakers	47	35	.573	5
6	x-Portland Trail Blazers	45	37	.549	7
7	San Diego Clippers	43	39	.524	9
8	Indiana Pacers	38	44	.463	14
9	Milwaukee Bucks	38	44	.463	14
10	Golden State Warriors	38	44	.463	14
11	Chicago Bulls	31	51	.378	21

=== Game log ===
1978–79 game log
Total: 50–32 (home: 32–9; road: 18–23)
October: 7–3 (home: 4–1; road: 3–2)

Game	Date	Team	Score	High points	Location Attendance	Record	Streak
1	October 13	San Diego	W 128–114	Paul Westphal (21)	Arizona Veterans Memorial Coliseum; 11,217	1–0	W 1
2	October 15	Golden State	W 129–110	Walter Davis (35)	Arizona Veterans Memorial Coliseum; 9,750	2–0	W 2
3	October 17	San Antonio	L 107–110	Paul Westphal (24)	Arizona Veterans Memorial Coliseum; 8,755	2–1	L 1
4	October 18	@ Golden State	W 122–112	Paul Westphal (33)	Oakland–Alameda County Coliseum Arena; 7,139	3–1	W 1
5	October 22	@ Portland	W 124–116	Walter Davis (28)	Memorial Coliseum; 12,666	4–1	W 2
6	October 24	Milwaukee	W 124–116	Walter Davis (38)	Arizona Veterans Memorial Coliseum; 11,728	5–1	W 3
7	October 25	@ Denver	L 104–108	Paul Westphal (29)	McNichols Sports Arena; 14,448	5–2	L 1
8	October 27	@ Chicago	W 115–110 (OT)	Paul Westphal (38)	Chicago Stadium; 7,807	6–2	W 1
9	October 28	@ Kansas City	L 102–112	Alvan Adams, Walter Davis (23)	Kemper Arena; 9,534	6–3	L 1
10	October 31	New York	W 120–108	Paul Westphal (35)	Arizona Veterans Memorial Coliseum; 11,197	7–3	W 1

November: 10–4 (home: 5–1; road: 5–3)

Game	Date	Team	Score	High points	Location Attendance	Record	Streak
11	November 2	@ New Orleans	W 106–99	Paul Westphal (27)	Louisiana Superdome; 6,943	8–3	W 2
12	November 4	@ Houston	L 103–110	Walter Davis (25)	The Summit; 9,163	8–4	L 1
13	November 8	Cleveland	W 118–96	Ron Lee (24)	Arizona Veterans Memorial Coliseum; 9,311	9–4	W 1
14	November 10	Denver	L 132–150	Paul Westphal (27)	Arizona Veterans Memorial Coliseum; 10,277	9–5	L 1
15	November 12	New Orleans	W 128–122	Alvan Adams (33)	Arizona Veterans Memorial Coliseum; 9,158	10–5	W 1
16	November 15	@ San Antonio	W 125–119	Paul Westphal (39)	HemisFair Arena; 10,489	11–5	W 2
17	November 17	@ Philadelphia	L 94–95	Paul Westphal (25)	The Spectrum; 11,513	11–6	L 1
18	November 18	@ Detroit	W 119–105	Paul Westphal (28)	Pontiac Silverdome; 10,789	12–6	W 1
19	November 21	@ Cleveland	W 110–108	Walter Davis (28)	Coliseum at Richfield; 6,524	13–6	W 2
20	November 22	@ Indiana	W 115–110	Walter Davis (32)	Market Square Arena; 9,432	14–6	W 3
21	November 24	Houston	W 120–113	Walter Davis (37)	Arizona Veterans Memorial Coliseum; 12,660	15–6	W 4
22	November 26	Chicago	W 125–109	Alvan Adams (22)	Arizona Veterans Memorial Coliseum; 10,921	16–6	W 5
23	November 28	@ Chicago	L 112–124	Walter Davis (26)	Chicago Stadium; 7,826	16–7	L 1
24	November 30	Detroit	W 119–109	Paul Westphal (29)	Arizona Veterans Memorial Coliseum; 9,633	17–7	W 1

December: 7–7 (home: 5–2; road: 2–5)

Game	Date	Team	Score	High points	Location Attendance	Record	Streak
25	December 1	@ Los Angeles	L 122–130	Paul Westphal (32)	The Forum; 10,529	17–8	L 1
26	December 2	Golden State	L 108–116	Alvan Adams (29)	Arizona Veterans Memorial Coliseum; 9,167	17–9	L 2
27	December 6	Atlanta	W 136–109	Walter Davis (25)	Arizona Veterans Memorial Coliseum; 10,345	18–9	W 1
28	December 8	@ Boston	W 124–104	Paul Westphal (30)	Boston Garden; 11,762	19–9	W 2
29	December 9	@ Washington	L 98–101	Paul Westphal (30)	Capital Centre; 17,438	19–10	L 1
30	December 12	@ Milwaukee	L 114–120	Paul Westphal (36)	MECCA Arena; 10,938	19–11	L 2
31	December 16	Los Angeles	W 119–100	Alvan Adams, Paul Westphal (25)	Arizona Veterans Memorial Coliseum; 11,327	20–11	W 1
32	December 17	@ San Diego	L 110–116	Alvan Adams (32)	San Diego Sports Arena; 6,068	20–12	L 1
33	December 20	Washington	L 129–137	Paul Westphal (36)	Arizona Veterans Memorial Coliseum; 9,789	20–13	L 2
34	December 22	Kansas City	W 123–103	Alvan Adams (32)	Arizona Veterans Memorial Coliseum; 10,533	21–13	W 1
35	December 26	@ Denver	W 106–102	Walter Davis (31)	McNichols Sports Arena; 16,325	22–13	W 2
36	December 28	Portland	W 129–127 (OT)	Walter Davis (42)	Arizona Veterans Memorial Coliseum; 12,510	23–13	W 3
37	December 29	@ Seattle	L 92–119	Mike Bratz (15)	Kingdome; 20,565	23–14	L 1
38	December 30	Boston	W 112–109	Alvan Adams (28)	Arizona Veterans Memorial Coliseum; 12,660	24–14	W 1

January: 7–6 (home: 4–3; road: 3–3)

Game	Date	Team	Score	High points	Location Attendance	Record	Streak
39	January 2	@ New York	W 114–102	Alvan Adams (28)	Madison Square Garden; 11,266	25–14	W 2
40	January 5	@ Washington	L 94–104	Ron Lee (19)	Capital Centre; 14,929	25–15	L 1
41	January 6	@ Philadelphia	W 143–139 (OT)	Walter Davis (35)	The Spectrum; 16,109	26–15	W 1
42	January 7	@ New Jersey	L 112–117	Alvan Adams (32)	Rutgers Athletic Center; 3,439	26–16	L 1
43	January 11	Seattle	L 106–109	Walter Davis (26)	Arizona Veterans Memorial Coliseum; 12,660	26–17	L 2
44	January 13	Indiana	L 99–102	Walter Davis (24)	Arizona Veterans Memorial Coliseum; 12,660	26–18	L 3
45	January 17	@ Milwaukee	L 118–123	Truck Robinson (25)	MECCA Arena; 10,661	26–19	L 4
46	January 18	@ Detroit	W 97–87	Walter Davis (26)	Pontiac Silverdome; 5,839	27–19	W 1
47	January 20	Houston	W 116–97	Paul Westphal (28)	Arizona Veterans Memorial Coliseum; 12,660	28–19	W 2
48	January 24	Philadelphia	W 101–94	Truck Robinson (26)	Arizona Veterans Memorial Coliseum; 12,660	29–19	W 3
49	January 26	New York	W 108–107	Walter Davis (24)	Arizona Veterans Memorial Coliseum; 11,813	30–19	W 4
50	January 28	New Jersey	L 114–117	Alvan Adams, Walter Davis (25)	Arizona Veterans Memorial Coliseum; 12,357	30–20	L 1
51	January 31	Milwaukee	W 123–118	Paul Westphal (28)	Arizona Veterans Memorial Coliseum; 11,736	31–20	W 1

February: 6–6 (home: 5–1; road: 1–5)

Game	Date	Team	Score	High points	Location Attendance	Record	Streak
52	February 2	San Antonio	W 133–108	Alvan Adams (24)	Arizona Veterans Memorial Coliseum; 12,660	32–20	W 2
53	February 6	@ Portland	L 93–110	Truck Robinson (19)	Memorial Coliseum; 12,666	32–21	L 1
54	February 9	Atlanta	L 102–105	Paul Westphal (32)	Arizona Veterans Memorial Coliseum; 11,928	32–22	L 2
55	February 11	Cleveland	W 136–101	Truck Robinson (24)	Arizona Veterans Memorial Coliseum; 10,972	33–22	W 1
56	February 15	Washington	W 119–108	Paul Westphal (32)	Arizona Veterans Memorial Coliseum; 12,660	34–22	W 2
57	February 16	@ Seattle	L 104–119	Mike Bratz (19)	Kingdome; 23,103	34–23	L 1
58	February 17	New Orleans	W 136–112	Alvan Adams (22)	Arizona Veterans Memorial Coliseum; 12,660	35–23	W 1
59	February 20	@ New York	W 117–107	Paul Westphal (36)	Madison Square Garden; 10,921	36–23	W 2
60	February 21	@ New Jersey	L 112–123	Paul Westphal (25)	Rutgers Athletic Center; 3,812	36–24	L 1
61	February 23	@ Kansas City	L 112–121	Truck Robinson (28)	Kemper Arena; 10,768	36–25	L 2
62	February 24	@ Atlanta	L 85–110	Truck Robinson (21)	Omni Coliseum; 12,281	36–26	L 3
63	February 28	Indiana	W 103–102	Paul Westphal (27)	Arizona Veterans Memorial Coliseum; 10,735	37–26	W 1

March: 10–4 (home: 6–1; road: 4–3)

Game	Date	Team	Score	High points	Location Attendance	Record	Streak
64	March 2	Denver	L 105–119	Paul Westphal (28)	Arizona Veterans Memorial Coliseum; 11,835	37–27	L 1
65	March 4	Philadelphia	W 119–94	Walter Davis (26)	Arizona Veterans Memorial Coliseum; 10,722	38–27	W 1
66	March 8	Chicago	W 132–117	Alvan Adams, Don Buse, Walter Davis (21)	Arizona Veterans Memorial Coliseum; 10,126	39–27	W 2
67	March 11	@ Indiana	L 111–112	Paul Westphal (24)	Market Square Arena; 14,173	39–28	L 1
68	March 13	@ Cleveland	W 124–120	Walter Davis (36)	Coliseum at Richfield; 7,690	40–28	W 1
69	March 14	@ Boston	W 126–117	Paul Westphal (39)	Boston Garden; 10,308	41–28	W 2
70	March 16	@ San Antonio	W 128–122	Paul Westphal (43)	HemisFair Arena; 14,864	42–28	W 3
71	March 17	@ Houston	L 122–134	Paul Westphal (22)	The Summit; 12,557	42–29	L 1
72	March 18	@ New Orleans	L 117–121	Walter Davis, Paul Westphal (29)	Louisiana Superdome; 5,108	42–30	L 2
73	March 21	Boston	W 134–113	Walter Davis (33)	Arizona Veterans Memorial Coliseum; 11,568	43–30	W 1
74	March 23	Kansas City	W 126–107	Paul Westphal (36)	Arizona Veterans Memorial Coliseum; 12,660	44–30	W 2
75	March 25	@ Golden State	W 111–95	Paul Westphal (25)	Oakland–Alameda County Coliseum Arena; 10,651	45–30	W 3
76	March 28	Los Angeles	W 112–106	Paul Westphal (32)	Arizona Veterans Memorial Coliseum; 11,805	46–30	W 4
77	March 30	Seattle	W 113–111 (OT)	Walter Davis (40)	Arizona Veterans Memorial Coliseum; 12,660	47–30	W 5

April: 3–2 (home: 3–0; road: 0–2)

Game	Date	Team	Score	High points	Location Attendance	Record	Streak
78	April 1	Detroit	W 116–105	Alvan Adams (23)	Arizona Veterans Memorial Coliseum; 10,550	48–30	W 6
79	April 4	Portland	W 106–95	Paul Westphal (21)	Arizona Veterans Memorial Coliseum; 11,305	49–30	W 7
80	April 6	San Diego	W 118–117	Alvan Adams (23)	Arizona Veterans Memorial Coliseum; 12,660	50–30	W 8
81	April 7	@ San Diego	L 116–120	Walter Davis, Paul Westphal (22)	San Diego Sports Arena; 11,614	50–31	L 1
82	April 8	@ Los Angeles	L 103–111	Walter Davis (21)	The Forum; 11,973	50–32	L 2

1978–79 schedule

== Playoffs ==
=== Game log ===
1979 playoff game log
First Round: 2–1 (home: 2–0; road: 0–1)

Game	Date	Team	Score	High points	High rebounds	High assists	Location Attendance	Series
1	April 10	Portland	W 107–103	Paul Westphal (28)	Adams, Davis (5)	Alvan Adams (9)	Arizona Veterans Memorial Coliseum; 12,660	1–0
2	April 13	@ Portland	L 92–96	Walter Davis (31)	Gar Heard (9)	Paul Westphal (6)	Memorial Coliseum; 12,666	1–1
3	April 15	Portland	W 101–91	Paul Westphal (26)	Gar Heard (12)	Walter Davis (8)	Arizona Veterans Memorial Coliseum; 12,660	2–1

Conference semifinals: 4–1 (home: 3–0; road: 1–1)

Game	Date	Team	Score	High points	High rebounds	High assists	Location Attendance	Series
1	April 17	Kansas City	W 102–99	Paul Westphal (25)	Truck Robinson (12)	Don Buse (5)	Arizona Veterans Memorial Coliseum; 12,660	1–0
2	April 20	@ Kansas City	L 91–111	Truck Robinson (17)	Truck Robinson (13)	Walter Davis (5)	Kemper Arena; 13,659	1–1
3	April 22	Kansas City	W 108–93	Walter Davis (22)	Alvan Adams (9)	Walter Davis (7)	Arizona State University Activity Center; 14,301	2–1
4	April 25	@ Kansas City	W 108–94	Paul Westphal (26)	Gar Heard (14)	Alvan Adams (8)	Kemper Arena; 13,184	3–1
5	April 27	Kansas City	W 120–99	Paul Westphal (32)	Joel Kramer (11)	Bratz, Kramer (5)	Arizona Veterans Memorial Coliseum; 12,660	4–1

Conference finals: 3–4 (home: 2–1; road: 1–3)

Game	Date	Team	Score	High points	High rebounds	High assists	Location Attendance	Series
1	May 1	@ Seattle	L 93–108	Alvan Adams (18)	Alvan Adams (12)	Adams, Davis (4)	Seattle Center Coliseum; 14,098	0–1
2	May 4	@ Seattle	L 97–103	Paul Westphal (29)	Truck Robinson (9)	Buse, Davis (5)	Kingdome; 31,964	0–2
3	May 6	Seattle	W 113–103	Paul Westphal (25)	Walter Davis (10)	Paul Westphal (6)	Arizona Veterans Memorial Coliseum; 12,660	1–2
4	May 8	Seattle	W 100–91	Walter Davis (27)	Gar Heard (12)	Paul Westphal (10)	Arizona Veterans Memorial Coliseum; 12,660	2–2
5	May 11	@ Seattle	W 99–93	Paul Westphal (27)	Truck Robinson (14)	Paul Westphal (5)	Kingdome; 28,935	3–2
6	May 13	Seattle	L 105–106	Paul Westphal (29)	Joel Kramer (8)	Paul Westphal (8)	Arizona Veterans Memorial Coliseum; 12,660	3–3
7	May 17	@ Seattle	L 110–114	Walter Davis (26)	Truck Robinson (14)	Paul Westphal (9)	Kingdome; 37,552	4–3

1979 schedule

== Awards and honors ==
=== All-Star ===
- Paul Westphal was voted as a starter for the Western Conference in the All-Star Game. It was his third consecutive All-Star selection. Westphal finished second in voting among Western Conference guards with 251,829 votes.
- Walter Davis was selected as a reserve for the Western Conference in the All-Star Game. It was his second consecutive All-Star selection. Davis finished fifth in voting among Western Conference forwards with 118,546 votes.

=== Season ===
- Paul Westphal was named to the All-NBA First Team.
- Walter Davis was named to the All-NBA Second Team. Davis also finished tenth in MVP voting.
- Don Buse was named to the NBA All-Defensive First Team.

== Player statistics ==
Legend
GP	Games played	GS	Games started	MPG	Minutes per game
FG%	Field-goal percentage	FT%	Free-throw percentage	RPG	Rebounds per game
APG	Assists per game	SPG	Steals per game	BPG	Blocks per game
PPG	Points per game

=== Season ===
Player	GP	GS	MPG	FG%	FT%	RPG	APG	SPG	BPG	PPG
Alvan Adams	77	74	30.7	.530	.799	9.2	4.7	1.4	.8	17.8
Mike Bratz	77	0	16.8	.454	.818	1.8	2.3	.8	.1	8.1
Don Buse	82	82	31.0	.495	.769	2.6	4.3	1.9	.2	7.8
Marty Byrnes*	43	1	17.1	.489	.730	2.3	1.4	.3	.0	6.8
Walter Davis	79	78	30.8	.561	.831	4.7	4.3	1.9	.3	23.6
Bayard Forrest	75	7	16.6	.434	.539	4.2	2.2	.4	.5	4.0
Garfield Heard	63	37	19.3	.441	.689	5.6	1.0	.8	.9	6.3
Joel Kramer	82	1	17.1	.489	.710	4.1	1.1	.5	.3	5.9
Ron Lee*	43	1	22.0	.452	.712	2.6	3.1	1.6	.1	9.8
Ted McClain	36	0	12.9	.470	.913^	1.9	1.7	.5	.0	4.6
Truck Robinson*	26	20	29.1	.508	.642	8.7	1.5	.7	.5	16.0
Alvin Scott	81	28	21.4	.535	.714	4.4	1.6	1.0	.8	6.7
Paul Westphal	81	81	32.6	.535	.837^	2.0	6.5	1.4	.3	24.0

* – Stats with the Suns.
^ – Minimum 125 free throws made.

=== Playoffs ===
Player	GP	GS	MPG	FG%	FT%	RPG	APG	SPG	BPG	PPG
Alvan Adams	12	12	31.0	.475	.710	7.5	4.4	.9	1.0	12.8
Mike Bratz	15	0	19.5	.496	.763	1.4	2.0	1.0	.2	10.6
Don Buse	15	15	34.1	.405	.727	3.7	3.5	1.5	.3	7.9
Walter Davis	15	15	32.7	.520	.813	4.6	5.3	1.7	.3	22.1
Bayard Forrest	14	0	7.9	.556†	.200	2.1	0.8	.3	.1	1.6
Garfield Heard	15	9	21.3	.372	.600	7.1	0.9	.8	1.7	5.5
Joel Kramer	15	3	17.1	.542†	.722	3.8	1.3	.6	.5	6.0
Ted McClain	14	0	7.4	.441	.813	1.1	0.9	.4	.0	3.1
Truck Robinson	15	6	26.1	.403	.652	8.1	0.7	.4	.8	10.5
Alvin Scott	15	0	14.5	.385	.619	2.8	1.5	.4	1.1	3.5
Paul Westphal	15	15	35.6	.495	.788	2.2	4.3	1.0	.3	22.4

† – Minimum 20 field goals made.

== Transactions ==
=== Trades ===
October 11, 1978	To Boston Celtics (United States) Dennis Awtrey	To Phoenix Suns 1979 second-round draft pick ( (United States) Johnny High) Cash considerations
January 12, 1979	To New Orleans Jazz (United States) Marty Byrnes (United States) Ron Lee 1979 first-round draft pick ( (United States) Larry Knight) 1980 first-round draft pick ( (United States) John Duren) Cash considerations	To Phoenix Suns (United States) Truck Robinson

=== Free agents ===
==== Additions ====
Date	Player	Contract	Old Team
January 15, 1979	Ted McClain	Undisclosed	Philadelphia 76ers

==== Subtractions ====
Date	Player	Reason left	New team
August 23, 1978	Greg Griffin	Suspended for signing overseas	
August 23, 1978	Wayne Smith	Waived	
September 13, 1978	Curtis Perry	Retired	
October 12, 1978	Ira Terrell	Waived	New Orleans Jazz
October 12, 1978	Andre Wakefield	Waived	Chicago Bulls
