= 1978–79 San Diego Clippers season =

NBA professional basketball team season

- Head coach: Gene Shue
- Arena: San Diego Sports Arena

Results
- Record: 43–39 (.524)
- Place: Division: 5th (Pacific); Conference: 7th (Western)
- Playoff finish: Did not qualify
- Stats at Basketball Reference

Local media
- Television: XETV
- Radio: KGB

The 1978–79 San Diego Clippers season was the 9th season of the team formerly known as the Buffalo Braves in the NBA. They had moved from Buffalo, New York to San Diego, California and rechristened themselves as the San Diego Clippers.

== Draft picks ==
Round	Pick	Player	Position	Nationality	School/Club team
2	41	Jerome Whitehead	Forward	United States	Marquette
3	48	Mike Santos	Forward	United States	Utah State
3	51	Ricky Gallon	Center	United States	Louisville
3	65	Marvin Delph	Guard	United States	Arkansas
4	68	Jim Boylan	Guard	United States	Marquette
4	73	Larry Harris	Forward	United States	Pittsburgh
4	76	Leroy McDonald	Guard	United States	Wake Forest
5	90	David Thompson	Forward	United States	Florida State
6	112	Bob Misevicius	Forward	United States	Providence
7	133	Stan Pietkiewicz	Guard	United States	Auburn
8	154	Felton Young	Center	United States	Jacksonville
9	172	Bobby White	Forward	United States	Centenary (LA)

== Roster ==
1978–79 San Diego Clippers roster
Players

Pos.	No.	Player	Height	Weight	DOB	From
F	32	Bob Bigelow	6 ft 7 in (2.01 m)	215 lb (98 kg)		Penn
G	24	Lloyd Free	6 ft 2 in (1.88 m)	185 lb (84 kg)		Guilford
C	44	Kevin Kunnert	7 ft 0 in (2.13 m)	231 lb (105 kg)		Iowa
C	45	Scott Lloyd	6 ft 10 in (2.08 m)	230 lb (104 kg)		Arizona State
C	31	Swen Nater	6 ft 11 in (2.11 m)	240 lb (109 kg)		UCLA
G	11	Connie Norman	6 ft 3 in (1.91 m)	176 lb (80 kg)		Arizona
F	40	John Olive	6 ft 7 in (2.01 m)	210 lb (95 kg)		Villanova
F	22	Stan Pietkiewicz	6 ft 5 in (1.96 m)	200 lb (91 kg)		Auburn
G	9	Randy Smith	6 ft 3 in (1.91 m)	185 lb (84 kg)		Buffalo State
G	14	Brian Taylor	6 ft 2 in (1.88 m)	185 lb (84 kg)		Princeton
F	42	Kermit Washington	6 ft 8 in (2.03 m)	230 lb (104 kg)		American
F	12	Nick Weatherspoon	6 ft 7 in (2.01 m)	197 lb (89 kg)		Illinois
C	33	Jerome Whitehead	6 ft 10 in (2.08 m)	225 lb (102 kg)		Marquette
F	21	Sidney Wicks	6 ft 9 in (2.06 m)	225 lb (102 kg)		UCLA
G	20	Freeman Williams	6 ft 4 in (1.93 m)	185 lb (84 kg)		Portland State

Coaches
Head coach
- Gene Shue
Assistant(s)
- Bob Weiss

Legend
- (DP) Unsigned draft pick
- (FA) Free agent
- (S) Suspended
- Injured

=== Roster notes ===
- This was Kevin Kunnert's second stint with the franchise; he previously played for the Buffalo Braves in 1973–74.

== Regular season ==
=== Game log ===
1978-79 Regular Season Game Log (43–39) (Home: 29–12; Road: 14–27)
October (5–6) (Home: 4–2; Road: 1–4)

Game	Date	Team	Score	High points	High rebounds	High assists	Location Attendance	Record	Report
1	October 13	@ Suns	L 114–128	Kermit Washington (25)	Kermit Washington (11)	Randy Smith (11)	Arizona Veterans Memorial Coliseum; 11,217	0–1	
2	October 14	@ Warriors	L 89–117	Tied (21)	Kermit Washington (14)	Randy Smith (7)	Oakland-Alameda County Coliseum Arena; 10,254	0–2	
3	October 15	Nuggets	L 94–98	Randy Smith (28)	Swen Nater (12)	Lloyd Free (4)	San Diego Sports Arena; 8,362	0–3	
4	October 17	Bulls	W 99–94	Lloyd Free (29)	Tied (14)	Tied (4)	San Diego Sports Arena; 4,944	1–3	
5	October 18	Spurs	L 125–127	Lloyd Free (29)	Kermit Washington (16)	Lloyd Free (8)	San Diego Sports Arena; 5,614	1–4	
6	October 20	@ Bulls	W 110–94	Nick Weatherspoon (19)	Kermit Washington (13)	World B. Free (9)	Chicago Stadium; 12,412	2–4	
7	October 21	@ Pacers	L 119–125	Lloyd Free (35)	Tied (12)	Lloyd Free (6)	Market Square Arena; 9,243	2–5	
8	October 24	Lakers	W 124–123	Lloyd Free (35)	Kevin Kunnert (9)	Lloyd Free (7)	San Diego Sports Arena; 11,637	3–5	
9	October 25	Bucks	W 125–116	Lloyd Free (38)	Swen Nater (15)	Lloyd Free (9)	San Diego Sports Arena; 8,051	4–5	
10	October 27	@ Lakers	L 101–113	Lloyd Free (26)	Swen Nater (10)	Lloyd Free (5)	The Forum; 9,246	4–6	
11	October 29	SuperSonics	W 103–100	Randy Smith (26)	Kevin Kunnert (10)	Randy Smith (6)	San Diego Sports Arena; 9,469	5–6	

November (6–9) (Home: 4–4; Road: 2–5)

Game	Date	Team	Score	High points	High rebounds	High assists	Location Attendance	Record	Report
12	November 2	Knicks	L 122–127	Lloyd Free (42)	Kermit Washington (10)	Lloyd Free (7)	San Diego Sports Arena; 9,744	5–7	
13	November 3	@ Trail Blazers	L 98–119	Randy Smith (22)	Kermit Washington (11)	Randy Smith (4)	Memorial Coliseum; 12,666	5–8	
14	November 4	Cavaliers	L 106–112	Lloyd Free (24)	Kermit Washington (14)	Lloyd Free (6)	San Diego Sports Arena; 9,791	5–9	
15	November 7	@ Jazz	W 121–115	Lloyd Free (29)	Nick Weatherspoon (16)	Lloyd Free (6)	New Orleans Superdome; 6,411	6–9	
16	November 8	@ Spurs	L 125–163	Lloyd Free (26)	Swen Nater (9)	Tied (5)	HemisFair Arena; 11,358	6–10	
17	November 9	@ Hawks	L 101–125	Nick Weatherspoon (25)	Swen Nater (10)	Tied (4)	Omni Coliseum; 5,082	6–11	
18	November 11	@ Rockets	L 123–136	Lloyd Free (31)	Tied (6)	Randy Smith (11)	The Summit; 9,179	6–12	
19	November 14	Pacers	W 109–106	Kermit Washington (29)	Swen Nater (12)	Lloyd Free (5)	San Diego Sports Arena; 6,381	7–12	
20	November 16	Warriors	W 112–109	Lloyd Free (29)	Kermit Washington (10)	Lloyd Free (5)	San Diego Sports Arena; 8,483	8–12	
21	November 18	Jazz	W 114–111	Randy Smith (36)	Swen Nater (17)	Randy Smith (6)	San Diego Sports Arena; 8,151	9–12	
22	November 21	Hawks	L 107–113	Lloyd Free (26)	Kevin Kunnert (13)	Lloyd Free (6)	San Diego Sports Arena; 6,730	9–13	
23	November 24	@ 76ers	L 120–134	Lloyd Free (33)	Kermit Washington (11)	Lloyd Free (8)	The Spectrum; 18,276	9–14	
24	November 25	@ Kings	W 87–86	Lloyd Free (28)	Kevin Kunnert (15)	Tied (4)	Kemper Arena; 11,320	10–14	
25	November 26	Celtics	W 105–103	LLoyd Free (28)	Kermit Washington (9)	Randy Smith (7)	San Diego Sports Arena; 7,042	11–14	
26	November 30	Rockets	L 104–113	Nick Weatherspoon (22)	Nick Weatherspoon (11)	Randy Smith (7)	San Diego Sports Arena; 6,597	11–15	

December (7–6) (Home: 2–2; Road: 5–4)

Game	Date	Team	Score	High points	High rebounds	High assists	Location Attendance	Record	Report
27	December 2	Pistons	L 113–120	Tied (25)	Tied (13)	Randy Smith (9)	San Diego Sports Arena; 6,433	11–16	
28	December 6	@ Celtics	L 111–117	Lloyd Free (25)	Tied (11)	Randy Smith (10)	Boston Garden; 7,688	11–17	
29	December 9	@ Nets	L 120–125	Lloyd Free (38)	Swen Nater (10)	Lloyd Free (4)	Rutgers Athletic Center; 4,286	11–18	
30	December 10	@ Bucks	W 107–106	Lloyd Free (28)	Tied (12)	Lloyd Free (5)	MECCA Arena; 10,889	12–18	
31	December 12	@ Knicks	W 105–103	Randy Smith (28)	Tied (9)	Lloyd Free (8)	Madison Square Garden; 11,981	13–18	
32	December 13	@ Bullets	L 117–134	Randy Smith (29)	Swen Nater (9)	Randy Smith (6)	Capital Centre; 7,621	13–19	
33	December 17	Suns	W 116–100	Lloyd Free (30)	Swen Nater (13)	Randy Smith (5)	San Diego Sports Arena; 6,068	14–19	
34	December 19	76ers	L 113–124	Lloyd Free (35)	Swen Nater (10)	Swen Nater (3)	San Diego Sports Arena; 13,822	14–20	
35	December 25	@ SuperSonics	W 123–118	Randy Smith (29)	Swen Nater (13)	Randy Smith (12)	Kingdome; 11,910	15–20	
36	December 26	Bulls	W 115–109	Lloyd Free (36)	Kermit Washington (10)	Lloyd Free (5)	San Diego Sports Arena; 8,582	16–20	
37	December 28	@ Cavaliers	L 114–116	Lloyd Free (36)	Kevin Kunnert (9)	Lloyd Free (6)	Richfield Coliseum; 11,091	16–21	
38	December 29	@ Pistons	W 111–107	Lloyd Free (35)	Swen Nater (14)	Randy Smith (8)	Pontiac Silverdome; 10,284	17–21	
39	December 30	@ Pacers	W 114–111	Lloyd Free (30)	Kevin Kunnert (13)	Sidney Wicks (6)	Market Square Arena; 7,263	18–21	

January (8–6) (Home: 5–0; Road: 3–6)

Game	Date	Team	Score	High points	High rebounds	High assists	Location Attendance	Record	Report
40	January 2	Pistons	W 137–119	Lloyd Free (33)	Kermit Washington (17)	Kermit Washington (5)	San Diego Sports Arena; 6,139	19–21	
41	January 4	@ Kings	L 99–108	Randy Smith (37)	Kermit Washington (15)	Randy Smith (3)	Kemper Arena; 6,647	19–22	
42	January 6	@ Bucks	L 93–104	Freeman Williams (26)	Kermit Washington (14)	Randy Smith (6)	MECCA Arena; 10,938	19–23	
43	January 9	@ Jazz	W 114–107	Lloyd Free (34)	Kermit Washington (10)	Tied (7)	New Orleans Superdome; 6,342	20–23	
44	January 11	@ Spurs	L 111–140	Nick Weatherspoon (38)	Nick Weatherspoon (9)	Randy Smith (12)	HemisFair Arena; 11,008	20–24	
45	January 13	@ Hawks	L 119–124	Lloyd Free (46)	Kermit Washington (17)	Tied (3)	Omni Coliseum; 7,681	20–25	
46	January 14	@ Bullets	L 91–125	Randy Smith (24)	Kermit Washington (13)	Randy Smith (8)	Capital Centre; 9,588	20–26	
47	January 17	Lakers	W 119–117	Lloyd Free (31)	Tied (11)	Tied (4)	San Diego Sports Arena; 13,073	21–26	
48	January 24	Trail Blazers	W 122–121	Lloyd Free (35)	Nick Weatherspoon (11)	Lloyd Free (5)	San Diego Sports Arena; 9,659	22–26	
49	January 26	@ Bulls	W 107–91	Lloyd Free (28)	Swen Nater (15)	Tied (5)	Chicago Stadium; 8,523	23–26	
50	January 27	@ Cavaliers	W 111–110	Lloyd Free (38)	Kermit Washington (15)	Lloyd Free (4)	Richfield Coliseum; 10,523	24–26	
51	January 28	@ Pistons	L 118–128	Lloyd Free (23)	Swen Nater (10)	Sidney Wicks (6)	Pontiac Silverdome; 9,279	24–27	
52	January 30	Bucks	W 117–113	Randy Smith (26)	Kevin Kunnert (14)	Tied (7)	San Diego Sports Arena; 8,431	25–27	
53	January 31	Nets	W 112–104	Lloyd Free (25)	Kermit Washington (14)	Randy Smith (6)	San Diego Sports Arena; 7,227	26–27	

February (8-4) (Home: 7–2; Road: 1–2)

Game	Date	Team	Score	High points	High rebounds	High assists	Location Attendance	Record	Report
54	February 2	Nuggets	W 124–100	Lloyd Free (49)	Kevin Kunnert (12)	Randy Smith (5)	San Diego Sports Arena; 11,763	27–28	
55	February 7	Spurs	L 113–126	Lloyd Free (25)	Kermit Washington (10)	Tied (4)	San Diego Sports Arena; 8,498	27–28	
56	February 9	@ 76ers	L 106–117	Randy Smith (25)	Nick Weatherspoon (13)	Nick Weatherspoon (5)	The Spectrum; 15,823	27–29	
57	February 11	@ Nets	L 98–104	Lloyd Free (22)	Swen Nater (18)	Lloyd Free (6)	Rutgers Athletic Center; 14,749	27–30	
58	February 13	Bullets	L 136–138 2OT	Lloyd Free (45)	Nick Weatherspoon (10)	Lloyd Free (4)	San Diego Sports Arena; 8,111	27–31	
59	February 15	Jazz	W 122–112	Lloyd Free (30)	Swen Nater (10)	Randy Smith (5)	San Diego Sports Arena; 5,827	28–31	
60	February 16	@ Nuggets	W 118–104	Randy Smith (25)	Kermit Washington (14)	Tied (5)	McNichols Sports Arena; 15,119	29–31	
61	February 18	Hawks	W 116–101	Lloyd Free (26)	Sidney Wicks (13)	Randy Smith (4)	San Diego Sports Arena; 6,959	30–31	
62	February 23	76ers	W 117–116	Lloyd Free (26)	Swen Nater (10)	Tied (3)	San Diego Sports Arena; 13,783	31–31	
63	February 25	Celtics	W 131–116	Lloyd Free (38)	Kevin Kunnert (10)	Tied (6)	San Diego Sports Arena; 10,671	32–31	
64	February 27	Pacers	W 124–107	Lloyd Free (28)	Tied (9)	Kermit Washington (6)	San Diego Sports Arena; 6,156	33–31	
65	February 28	Kings	W 122–120	Randy Smith (22)	Swen Nater (8)	Randy Smith (7)	San Diego Sports Arena; 9,051	34–31	

March (7–6) (Home: 5–1; Road: 2–5)

Game	Date	Team	Score	High points	High rebounds	High assists	Location Attendance	Record	Report
66	March 2	@ Celtics	W 106–99	Lloyd Free (28)	Kermit Washington (15)	Randy Smith (6)	Boston Garden; 14,345	35–31	
67	March 3	@ Knicks	L 108–111	Lloyd Free (34)	Kevin Kunnert (23)	Tied (6)	Madison Square Garden; 11,488	35–32	
68	March 7	Rockets	W 138–115	Lloyd Free (34)	Swen Nater (10)	Tied (5)	San Diego Sports Arena; 19,911	36–32	
69	March 10	Cavaliers	W 121–115	Lloyd Free (33)	Swen Nater (12)	Tied (3)	San Diego Sports Arena; 13,783	37–32	
70	March 14	Trail Blazers	W 110–105	Lloyd Free (29)	Kevin Kunnert (12)	Randy Smith (9)	San Diego Sports Arena; 13,401	38–32	
71	March 17	Warriors	W 106–103	Lloyd Free (23)	Kevin Kunnert (11)	Tied (4)	San Diego Sports Arena; 11,332	39–32	
72	March 18	Nets	W 110–98	Lloyd Free (31)	Nick Weatherspoon (17)	Randy Smith (5)	San Diego Sports Arena; 18,538	40–32	
73	March 20	@ Trail Blazers	L 109–115	Randy Smith (28)	Swen Nater (12)	Randy Smith (12)	Memorial Coliseum; 12,666	40–33	
74	March 21	@ Warriors	W 106–103	Lloyd Free (35)	Kevin Kunnert (17)	Tied (5)	Oakland-Alameda County Coliseum Arena; 7,813	41–33	
75	March 23	@ Lakers	L 119–156	Randy Smith (33)	Kermit Washington (17)	Kermit Washington (6)	The Forum; 14,212	41–34	
76	March 27	@ SuperSonics	L 109–115	Lloyd Free (28)	Tied (9)	Lloyd Free (4)	Kingdome; 20,087	41–35	
77	March 29	Kings	L 111–116	Lloyd Free (37)	Kermit Washington (15)	Brian Taylor (4)	San Diego Sports Arena; 13,189	41–36	
78	March 30	@ Nuggets	L 121–130	Lloyd Free (42)	Kevin Kunnert (13)	Lloyd Free (6)	McNichols Sports Arena; 17,607	41–37	

April (2–2) (Home: 2–1; Road: 0–1)

Game	Date	Team	Score	High points	High rebounds	High assists	Location Attendance	Record	Report
79	April 1	Knicks	W 126–116	Lloyd Free (28)	Kevin Kunnert (15)	Tied (4)	San Diego Sports Arena; 8,371	42–37	
80	April 4	SuperSonics	L 107–115	Nick Weatherspoon (25)	Kermit Washington (13)	Randy Smith (5)	San Diego Sports Arena; 20,087	42–38	
81	April 6	@ Suns	L 117–118	Lloyd Free (29)	Swen Nater (10)	Tied (4)	Arizona Veterans Memorial Coliseum; 12,660	42–39	
82	April 7	Suns	W 120–116	Lloyd Free (36)	Swen Nater (12)	Brian Taylor (3)	San Diego Sports Arena; 11,614	43–39	

=== Season standings ===
Pacific Division	W	L	PCT	GB	Home	Road	Div
y-Seattle SuperSonics	52	30	.634	–	31–10	21–20	11–9
x-Phoenix Suns	50	32	.610	2	32–9	18–23	11–9
x-Los Angeles Lakers	47	35	.573	5	31–10	16–25	11–9
x-Portland Trail Blazers	45	37	.549	7	33–8	12–29	8–12
San Diego Clippers	43	39	.524	9	29–12	14–27	11–9
Golden State Warriors	38	44	.463	14	23–18	15–26	8–12

#	Western Conference				
#	Team	W	L	PCT	GB
1	z-Seattle SuperSonics	52	30	.634	–
2	y-Kansas City Kings	48	34	.585	4
3	x-Phoenix Suns	50	32	.610	2
4	x-Denver Nuggets	47	35	.573	5
5	x-Los Angeles Lakers	47	35	.573	5
6	x-Portland Trail Blazers	45	37	.549	7
7	San Diego Clippers	43	39	.524	9
8	Indiana Pacers	38	44	.463	14
9	Milwaukee Bucks	38	44	.463	14
10	Golden State Warriors	38	44	.463	14
11	Chicago Bulls	31	51	.378	21

Notes

- z, y – division champions
- x – clinched playoff spot

== Player stats ==
Legend
GP	Games played	MPG	Minutes per game	FG	Field-goals per game	FGA	Field-goals attempted per Game
FG%	Field-goal percentage	FT	Free-throws per game	FTA	Free-throws attempted per Game	FT%	Free-throw percentage
ORPG	Offensive rebounds per game	DRPG	Defensive rebounds per game	RPG	Rebounds per game	APG	Assists per game
SPG	Steals per game	BPG	Blocks per game	PFPG	Personal fouls per game	PPG	Points per game

Player	GP	MPG	FG	FGA	FG%	FT	FTA	FT%	ORPG	DRPG	RPG	APG	SPG	BPG	PFPG	PPG
Lloyd Free	78	37.9	10.2	21.2	0.481	8.4	11.1	0.756	1.6	2.2	3.9	4.4	1.4	0.4	3.2	28.8
Randy Smith	82	37.9	8.5	18.6	0.455	3.6	4.4	0.813	1.2	2.4	3.6	4.8	2.2	0.1	2.2	20.5
Kermit Washington	82	33.7	4.3	7.6	0.562	2.8	4.0	0.688	3.6	6.1	9.8	1.5	1.0	1.5	3.9	11.3
Nick Weatherspoon	82	32.2	5.8	12.2	0.480	2.1	2.9	0.739	2.2	3.4	5.5	1.6	1.0	0.5	3.5	13.8
Sidney Wicks	79	25.6	3.9	8.6	0.462	1.9	2.9	0.650	2.0	3.1	5.1	1.6	0.9	0.5	3.5	9.8
Swen Nater	79	25.4	4.5	7.9	0.569	1.7	2.1	0.800	2.8	6.1	8.9	1.8	0.5	0.4	3.1	10.7
Kevin Kunnert	81	20.8	2.9	6.2	0.467	0.7	1.0	0.659	2.5	4.5	7.0	1.4	0.6	1.5	3.8	6.5
Freeman Williams	72	16.6	4.7	9.5	0.490	1.1	1.4	0.776	0.7	0.7	1.4	1.2	0.6	0.0	1.2	10.4
Connie Norman	22	14.7	3.2	7.5	0.430	0.9	1.0	0.826	0.6	0.9	1.5	1.1	0.5	0.1	1.6	7.3
Bob Bigelow	29	14.2	1.2	3.1	0.400	0.4	0.7	0.619	0.5	1.1	1.6	0.9	0.4	0.1	1.3	2.9
Brian Taylor	20	10.6	1.5	4.2	0.361	0.8	0.9	0.889	0.7	0.7	1.3	1.0	1.2	0.0	1.7	3.8
Stan Pietkiewicz	4	8.0	0.3	2.0	0.125	0.5	0.5	1.000	0.0	1.5	1.5	0.8	0.3	0.0	1.3	1.0
Scott Lloyd	5	6.2	0.0	0.4	0.000	0.0	0.0		0.2	0.4	0.6	0.0	0.2	0.0	1.2	0.0
John Olive	34	5.6	0.4	1.2	0.325	0.5	0.7	0.783	0.1	0.5	0.6	0.1	0.1	0.0	0.9	1.3
Jerome Whitehead	31	4.9	0.5	1.1	0.441	0.3	0.6	0.444	0.5	1.1	1.6	0.2	0.1	0.1	0.9	1.2

== Awards and records ==
- Lloyd Free, All-NBA Second Team

== Transactions ==
The Clippers were involved in the following transactions during the 1978–79 season.

=== Coaching Change ===
Offseason
Outgoing Coach	Date Removed	1977-78 Record	Incoming Coach
Cotton Fitzsimmons	Fired, May 9, 1978	27–55	Gene Shue

=== Trades ===
June 7, 1978
To San Diego Clippers

- Tom Abernethy
To Los Angeles Lakers

- A 1978 second round draft pick
July 15, 1978
To San Diego Clippers

- A 1978 second round draft pick as compensation
To Golden State Warriors

- The right to sign Tom Abernethy as a veteran free agent
August 4, 1978
To San Diego Clippers

- Kermit Washington, Kevin Kunnert, Sidney Wicks & draft rights to Freeman Williams
To Boston Celtics

- Nate Archibald, Marvin Barnes, Billy Knight, and a 1981 & 1983 second round draft picks.
October 12, 1978
To San Diego Clippers

- Lloyd Free
To Philadelphia 76ers

- A 1984 first round draft pick
October 26, 1978
To San Diego Clippers

- A 1981 third round draft pick
To Chicago Bulls

- Scott Lloyd
February 15, 1979
To San Diego Clippers

- The right to sign Brian Taylor as a veteran free agent
To Denver Nuggets

- Two 1979 second round draft picks as compensation

=== Free agents ===
==== Additions ====
Player	Signed	Former team
Nick Weatherspoon	June 1	Chicago Bulls
Connie Norman	September 19	Philadelphia 76ers
Bob Bigelow	October 26	Boston Celtics
John Olive	December 5	Philadelphia 76ers

==== Subtractions ====
Player	Left	New team
Mike Glenn	free agency, June 12	New York Knickerbockers
Tom Abernethy	free agency, July 15	Golden State Warriors
Larry McNeill	waived, September 25	Rochester Zeniths(CBA)
Eddie Owens	waived, October 7	Rochester Zeniths (CBA)
Bird Averitt	waived, October 12	Montana Sky (WBA)
Wil Jones	waived, October 12	Retired
Bill Willoughby	waived, October 12	Cleveland Cavaliers
Stan Pietkiewicz	waived, November 26	Anchorage Northern Knights (CBA)
Connie Norman	waived, December 5	Lancaster Red Roses (CBA)
