= 1978–79 Kansas City Kings season =

NBA professional basketball team season

- Division champions
- Head coach: Cotton Fitzsimmons
- Owners: Leon Karosen; Robert Margolin; H. Paul Rosenberg
- Arena: Kemper Arena

Results
- Record: 48–34 (.585)
- Place: Division: 1st (Midwest); Conference: 2nd (Western)
- Playoff finish: West Conference Semi-finals (eliminated 1-4)
- Stats at Basketball Reference

Local media
- Television: KBMA-TV
- Radio: KCMO

The 1978–79 Kansas City Kings season was the Kings 30th season in the NBA and their seventh season in the city of Kansas City.

== Roster ==
1978–79 Kansas City Kings roster
Players

Pos.	No.	Player	Height	Weight	DOB	From
G	42	Lucius Allen	6 ft 2 in (1.88 m)	175 lb (79 kg)		UCLA
G	10	Otis Birdsong	6 ft 3 in (1.91 m)	190 lb (86 kg)		Houston
C	16	Tom Burleson	7 ft 2 in (2.18 m)	225 lb (102 kg)		NC State
G	1	Phil Ford	6 ft 2 in (1.88 m)	175 lb (79 kg)		North Carolina
F	22	Gus Gerard	6 ft 8 in (2.03 m)	200 lb (91 kg)		Virginia
F/C	30	Darnell Hillman	6 ft 9 in (2.06 m)	215 lb (98 kg)		San José State
C	44	Sam Lacey	6 ft 10 in (2.08 m)	235 lb (107 kg)		New Mexico State
G	25	Billy McKinney	6 ft 0 in (1.83 m)	160 lb (73 kg)		Northwestern
F	55	Bob Nash	6 ft 8 in (2.03 m)	195 lb (88 kg)		Hawaiʻi
F	52	Bill Robinzine	6 ft 7 in (2.01 m)	230 lb (104 kg)		DePaul
F	31	Richard Washington	6 ft 11 in (2.11 m)	220 lb (100 kg)		UCLA
F	15	Scott Wedman	6 ft 7 in (2.01 m)	215 lb (98 kg)		Colorado

Coaches
Head coach
- Cotton Fitzsimmons
Assistant(s)
- Frank Hamblen

Legend
- (DP) Unsigned draft pick
- (FA) Free agent
- (S) Suspended
- Injured

== Regular season ==
=== Season standings ===
Midwest Division	W	L	PCT	GB	Home	Road	Div
y-Kansas City Kings	48	34	.585	–	32–9	16–25	12–4
x-Denver Nuggets	47	35	.573	1	29–12	18–23	8–8
Indiana Pacers	38	44	.463	10	25–16	13–28	6–10
Milwaukee Bucks	38	44	.463	10	28–13	10–31	9–7
Chicago Bulls	31	51	.378	17	19–22	12–29	5–11

#	Western Conference				
#	Team	W	L	PCT	GB
1	z-Seattle SuperSonics	52	30	.634	–
2	y-Kansas City Kings	48	34	.585	4
3	x-Phoenix Suns	50	32	.610	2
4	x-Denver Nuggets	47	35	.573	5
5	x-Los Angeles Lakers	47	35	.573	5
6	x-Portland Trail Blazers	45	37	.549	7
7	San Diego Clippers	43	39	.524	9
8	Indiana Pacers	38	44	.463	14
9	Milwaukee Bucks	38	44	.463	14
10	Golden State Warriors	38	44	.463	14
11	Chicago Bulls	31	51	.378	21

z - clinched division title
y - clinched division title
x - clinched playoff spot

== Game log ==
=== Regular season ===
1978–79 game log
Total: 48–34 (Home: 32–9; Road: 16–25)
October: 4–5 (home: 3–1; road: 1–4)

Game	Date	Team	Score	High points	High rebounds	High assists	Location Attendance	Record
1	October 15, 1978	@ Seattle	L 105–115				Kingdome	0–1
2	October 17, 1978	@ Portland	L 112–115				Memorial Coliseum	0–2
3	October 19, 1978	Houston	W 108–103				Kemper Arena	1–2
7	October 27, 1978	@ Detroit	L 102–107				Pontiac Silverdome	3–4
8	October 28, 1978	Phoenix	W 112–101				Kemper Arena	4–4

November : 8–3 (home: 6–1; road: 2–2)

Game	Date	Team	Score	High points	High rebounds	High assists	Location Attendance	Record
12	November 4, 1978	Denver	W 109–107				Kemper Arena	6–6
14	November 10, 1978	@ Los Angeles	L 127–136				The Forum	7–7
15	November 11, 1978	@ Denver	W 117–113				McNichols Sports Arena	8–7
16	November 15, 1978	Atlanta	W 109–100				Kemper Arena	9–7
17	November 18, 1978	New Jersey	W 114–100				Kemper Arena	10–7
18	November 22, 1978	Portland	W 115–96				Kemper Arena	11–7

December : 8–6 (home: 3–3; road: 5–3)

Game	Date	Team	Score	High points	High rebounds	High assists	Location Attendance	Record
21	December 2, 1978	@ Washington	W 110–109				Capital Centre	13–8
23	December 6, 1978	Philadelphia	L 106–114				Kemper Arena	14–9
24	December 9, 1978	Detroit	W 132–108				Kemper Arena	15–9
25	December 13, 1978	@ Philadelphia	L 100–120				The Spectrum	15–10
28	December 20, 1978	Seattle	W 114–95				Kemper Arena	18–10
29	December 22, 1978	@ Phoenix	L 103–123				Arizona Veterans Memorial Coliseum	18–11
31	December 26, 1978	Houston	L 102–109				Kemper Arena	19–12
33	December 29, 1978	@ New Jersey	W 137–126				Rutgers Athletic Center	20–13

January : 10–6 (home: 7–1; road: 3–5)

Game	Date	Team	Score	High points	High rebounds	High assists	Location Attendance	Record
35	January 2, 1979	Denver	L 97–99				Kemper Arena	20–15
36	January 3, 1979	@ Denver	W 108–101				McNichols Sports Arena	21–15
39	January 9, 1979	@ Houston	L 110–126				The Summit	23–16
44	January 19, 1979	San Antonio	W 115–113				Kemper Arena	28–16
45	January 20, 1979	@ Detroit	L 110–122				Pontiac Silverdome	28–17
47	January 24, 1979	@ San Antonio	L 95–124				HemisFair Arena	28–19
48	January 26, 1979	Washington	W 142–128				Kemper Arena	29–19
50	January 31, 1979	@ Atlanta	L 118–130				The Omni	30–20

February : 10–4 (home: 8–0; road: 2–4)

Game	Date	Team	Score	High points	High rebounds	High assists	Location Attendance	Record
51	February 2, 1979	Detroit	W 114–95				Kemper Arena	31–20
All-Star Break
52	February 7, 1979	Atlanta	W 124–108				Kemper Arena	32–20
54	February 11, 1979	Los Angeles	W 104–103				Kemper Arena	34–20
55	February 13, 1979	@ New Jersey	L 102–111				Rutgers Athletic Center	34–21
56	February 14, 1979	@ Philadelphia	W 108–106				The Spectrum	35–21
57	February 16, 1979	Philadelphia	W 119–104				Kemper Arena	36–21
61	February 23, 1979	Phoenix	W 121–112				Kemper Arena	39–22
62	February 25, 1979	Seattle	W 114–106				Kemper Arena	40–22
63	February 27, 1979	@ Los Angeles	L 114–122				The Forum	40–23

March : 5–10 (home: 3–3; road: 2–7)

Game	Date	Team	Score	High points	High rebounds	High assists	Location Attendance	Record
65	March 2, 1979	@ San Antonio	L 125–129 (OT)				HemisFair Arena	40–25
67	March 7, 1979	@ Atlanta	L 120–122 (OT)				The Omni	40–27
68	March 9, 1979	Washington	W 121–116				Kemper Arena	41–27
69	March 11, 1979	Portland	L 100–115				Kemper Arena	41–28
70	March 14, 1979	@ Houston	L 107–129				The Summit	41–29
73	March 21, 1979	San Antonio	L 116–123				Kemper Arena	43–30
74	March 23, 1979	@ Phoenix	L 107–126				Arizona Veterans Memorial Coliseum	43–31
75	March 24, 1979	@ Portland	L 98–100				Memorial Coliseum	43–32
76	March 25, 1979	@ Seattle	L 101–111				Kingdome	43–33

April : 3–0 (home: 2–0; road: 1–0)

Game	Date	Team	Score	High points	High rebounds	High assists	Location Attendance	Record
80	April 4, 1979	Los Angeles	W 115–111 (OT)				Kemper Arena	46–34
81	April 6, 1978	New Jersey	W 117–114 (OT)				Kemper Arena	47–34

1978–79 schedule

=== Playoffs ===
1979 playoff game log
Western Conference Semifinals: 1–4 (home: 1–1; road: 0–3)

Game	Date	Team	Score	High points	High rebounds	High assists	Location Attendance	Series
1	April 17, 1979	@ Phoenix	L 99–102	Birdsong (20)	Lacey (12)	Ford (7)	Arizona Veterans Memorial Coliseum; 12,660	0–1
2	April 20, 1979	Phoenix	W 111–91	Birdsong (23)	Wedman (10)	Ford (9)	Kemper Arena; 13,659	1–1
3	April 22, 1979	@ Phoenix	L 93–108	Birdsong; Wedman (22)	Robinzine (10)	Ford, Lacey, McKinney (5)	Arizona State University Activity Center; 14,301	1–2
4	April 25, 1979	Phoenix	L 94–108	Wedman (21)	Lacey (13)	Ford; Lacey (5)	Kemper Arena; 13,184	1–3
5	April 27, 1979	@ Phoenix	L 99–120	Birdsong (21)	Lacey (10)	McKinney (7)	Arizona Veterans Memorial Coliseum; 12,660	1–4

1979 schedule

== Awards and records ==
- Phil Ford, NBA Rookie of the Year Award
- Cotton Fitzsimmons, NBA Coach of the Year Award
- Phil Ford, All-NBA Second Team
- Phil Ford, NBA All-Rookie Team 1st Team
