= Nick Weatherspoon =

American basketball player (1950–2008)

Personal information
- Born: July 20, 1950 Greenwood, Mississippi, U.S.
- Died: October 17, 2008 (aged 58) Canton, Ohio, U.S.
- Listed height: 6 ft 7 in (2.01 m)
- Listed weight: 195 lb (88 kg)

Career information
- High school: Canton McKinley (Canton, Ohio)
- College: Illinois (1970–1973)
- NBA draft: 1973: 1st round, 13th overall pick
- Drafted by: Capital Bullets
- Playing career: 1973–1980
- Position: Small forward
- Number: 12, 13

Career history
- 1973–1976: Capital / Washington Bullets
- 1976–1977: Seattle SuperSonics
- 1977–1978: Chicago Bulls
- 1978–1980: San Diego Clippers

Career highlights
- NBA All-Rookie First Team (1974)

Career NBA statistics
- Points: 4,086 (9.0 ppg)
- Rebounds: 2,232 (4.9 rpg)
- Assists: 418 (0.9 apg)
- Stats at NBA.com
- Stats at Basketball Reference

Nick Levoter Weatherspoon (July 20, 1950 – October 17, 2008) was an American professional basketball player.

== Career ==
Weatherspoon scored 1,431 points at Canton McKinley High School, holding the Bulldog scoring record for 37 years until Raymar Morgan broke it during the 2005–06 season. He was an All-American at the University of Illinois before being selected by the Capital Bullets with the 13th pick of the 1973 NBA draft. Named to the 1974 NBA All-Rookie Team, Weatherspoon spent a total of seven seasons in the NBA with the Bullets, the Seattle SuperSonics, the Chicago Bulls, and the San Diego Clippers. His nickname "Spoon" was featured on the back of his Washington Bullets jerseys instead of his surname.

Weatherspoon was elected to the "Illini Men's Basketball All-Century Team" in 2004. He was a member of Alpha Phi Alpha fraternity, and was initiated in the Fraternity through Tau chapter in 1971.

== Honors ==
=== Basketball ===
- 1972 – Team MVP
- 1972 – Honorable Mention All-Big Ten
- 1973 – Team Captain
- 1973 – Team MVP
- 1973 – 1st Team All-Big Ten
- 1973 – Honorable Mention All American
- 2004 – Elected to the "Illini Men's Basketball All-Century Team".
- 2008 – Honored jersey which hangs in the State Farm Center to show regard for being the most decorated basketball players in the University of Illinois' history.

== Career statistics ==
Legend
GP	Games played	GS	Games started	MPG	Minutes per game
FG%	Field goal percentage	3P%	3-point field goal percentage	FT%	Free throw percentage
RPG	Rebounds per game	APG	Assists per game	SPG	Steals per game
BPG	Blocks per game	PPG	Points per game	**Bold**	Career high

=== NBA ===
==== Regular season ====
Year	Team	GP	GS	MPG	FG%	3P%	FT%	RPG	APG	SPG	BPG	PPG
1973–74	Capital	65	—	18.7	.412	—	.691	6.1	.6	.7	.2	7.6
1974–75	Washington	**82**	—	16.4	.456	—	.746	4.2	.6	.8	.3	7.5
1975–76	Washington	64	—	16.9	.476	—	.701	4.3	.9	.7	.3	8.3
1976–77	Washington	11	—	13.8	.355	—	.625	2.2	.2	.3	**.5**	5.4
1976–77	Seattle	51	—	29.5	.461	—	.632	**7.9**	1.0	**1.0**	**.5**	12.8
1977–78	Chicago	41	—	14.9	.443	—	**.881**	3.0	.8	.5	.2	5.1
1978–79	San Diego	**82**	—	**32.2**	**.480**	—	.739	5.5	**1.6**	**1.0**	**.5**	**13.8**
1979–80	San Diego	57	—	19.7	.434	—	.692	3.6	.9	.6	.3	6.9
Career		453	—	21.4	.455	—	.713	4.9	.9	.8	.3	9.0

==== Playoffs ====
Year	Team	GP	GS	MPG	FG%	3P%	FT%	RPG	APG	SPG	BPG	PPG
1974	Capital	7	—	12.4	.474	—	.400	3.9	.0	.3	.3	2.9
1975	Washington	**17**	—	23.8	**.515**	—	**.814**	4.8	.9	**.8**	.1	10.3
1976	Washington	7	—	**32.0**	.450	—	.560	**6.0**	**1.4**	.3	**.6**	**12.3**
Career		31	—	23.1	.489	—	.699	4.8	.8	.6	.3	9.1

=== College ===
Year	Team	GP	GS	MPG	FG%	3P%	FT%	RPG	APG	SPG	BPG	PPG
1970–71	Illinois	23	—	—	.452	—	.718	10.7	—	—	—	16.6
1971–72	Illinois	24	24	—	.419	—	.746	11.0	—	—	—	20.8
1972–73	Illinois	24	23	36.7	.457	—	.711	12.3	—	—	—	25.0
Career		71	47	36.7	.443	—	.725	11.4	—	—	—	20.9
