= 1978–79 Portland Trail Blazers season =

NBA professional basketball team season

- Head coach: Jack Ramsay
- General manager: Harry Glickman
- Owner: Larry Weinberg
- Arena: Memorial Coliseum

Results
- Record: 45–37 (.549)
- Place: Division: 4th (Pacific); Conference: 6th (Western)
- Playoff finish: First round (lost to Suns 1–2)
- Stats at Basketball Reference

Local media
- Television: KOIN
- Radio: KWJJ

The 1978–79 Portland Trail Blazers season was the ninth season of the Portland Trail Blazers in the National Basketball Association (NBA).

During the offseason, MVP Bill Walton demanded to be traded, citing unethical and incompetent treatment of his and other players' injuries by the Blazers' front office. He did not get his wish and sat out the 1978–79 season in protest, signing with the San Diego Clippers when he became a free agent in 1979.

Before the draft, Larry Bird had just finished his junior year at Indiana State. However, he was eligible to be drafted without applying for "hardship" because his original college class at the Indiana University had graduated. He initially enrolled at Indiana in 1974 but dropped out before the season began. After sitting out a year, he enrolled at Indiana State. Despite being eligible for the draft, he stated that he would return to college for his senior season. His hometown team, the Indiana Pacers, initially held the first overall pick. However, when they failed to persuade him to leave college early, they traded the first pick to the Blazers, who also failed to convince him into signing; ultimately the Blazers used the first pick on Minnesota standout center Mychal Thompson.

As a result, the Blazers fell 13 games from their franchise-best record of the previous year, barely squeezing into the playoffs with a 45–37 record that earned them the sixth and final seed, only two games better than the Clippers.

The Blazers were ousted from the 1979 NBA Playoffs after losing their best-of-three series to the Phoenix Suns, two games to one.

== Draft picks ==
Note: This is not a complete list; only the first two rounds are covered, as well as any other picks by the franchise who played at least one NBA game.

Round	Pick	Player	Position	Nationality	School/Club team
1	1	Mychal Thompson	F/C	Bahamas	Minnesota
1	7	Ron Brewer	G	United States	Arkansas
2	24	Keith Herron	G/F	United States	Villanova
2	44	Clemon Johnson	F/C	United States	Florida A&M
5	110	Clay Johnson	G	United States	Missouri

== Roster ==
Portland Trail Blazers roster
Players

Pos.	No.	Player	Height	Weight	DOB	From
G	10	Ron Brewer	6 ft 4 in (1.93 m)	180 lb (82 kg)		Arkansas
F	30	Bob Gross	6 ft 6 in (1.98 m)	200 lb (91 kg)		Long Beach State
G	14	Lionel Hollins	6 ft 3 in (1.91 m)	185 lb (84 kg)		Arizona State
F	20	Maurice Lucas	6 ft 9 in (2.06 m)	215 lb (98 kg)		Marquette
F	36	Lloyd Neal	6 ft 7 in (2.01 m)	225 lb (102 kg)		Tennessee State
F/C	25	Tom Owens	6 ft 10 in (2.08 m)	215 lb (98 kg)		South Carolina
F	15	Larry Steele	6 ft 5 in (1.96 m)	180 lb (82 kg)		Kentucky
G	11	Willie Smith	6 ft 2 in (1.88 m)	170 lb (77 kg)		Missouri
F	33	Ira Terrell	6 ft 8 in (2.03 m)	200 lb (91 kg)		SMU
F/C	43	Mychal Thompson	6 ft 10 in (2.08 m)	226 lb (103 kg)		Minnesota
G	13	Dave Twardzik	6 ft 1 in (1.85 m)	175 lb (79 kg)		Old Dominion
C	32	Bill Walton (injured) (IN)	6 ft 11 in (2.11 m)	210 lb (95 kg)		UCLA

Coaches
Head coach
- Jack Ramsay
Assistant(s)
- Bucky Buckwalter

Legend
- (DP) Unsigned draft pick
- (FA) Free agent
- (S) Suspended
- Injured

== Regular season ==
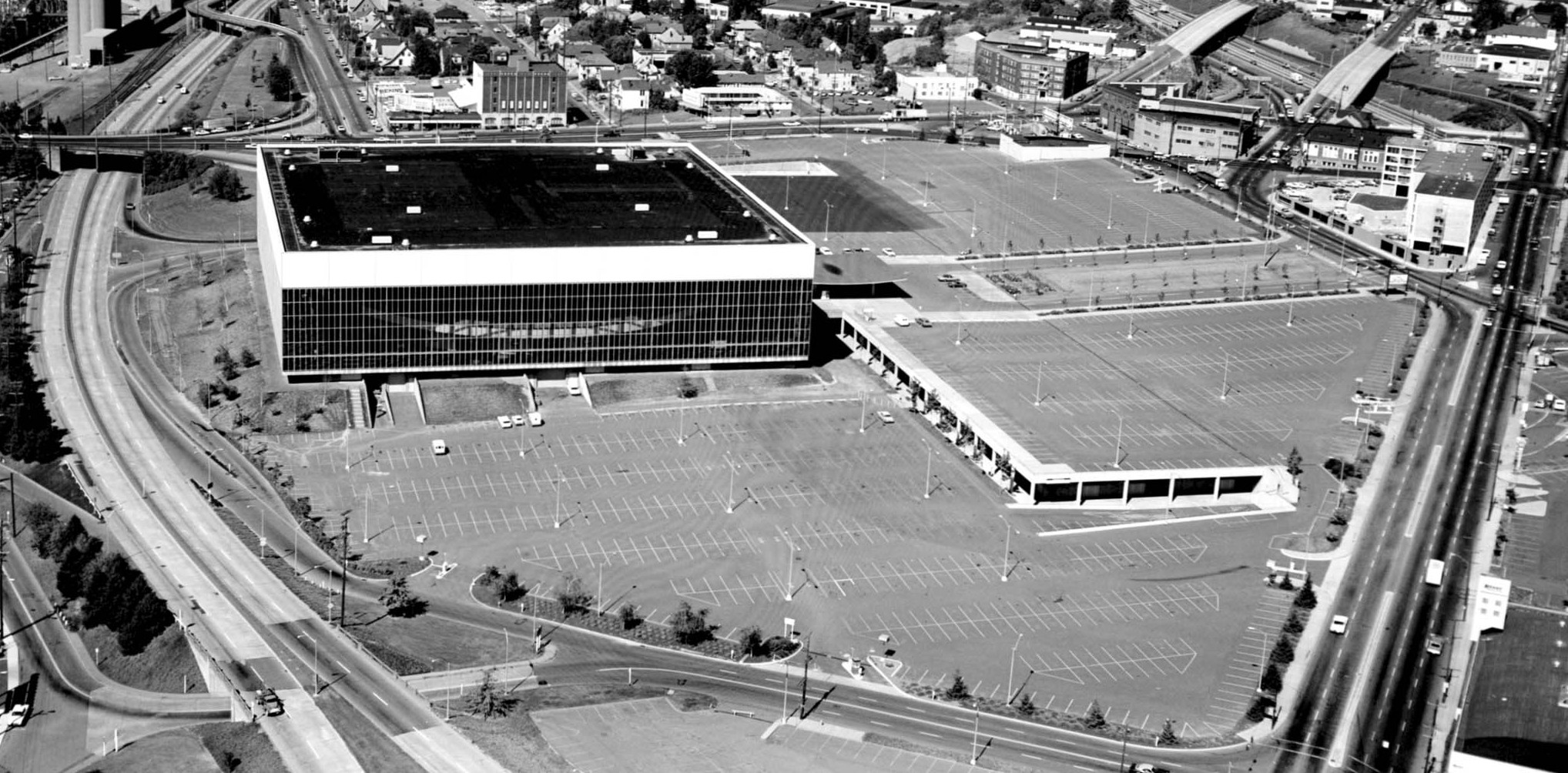
The Trail Blazers played their home games at Veterans Memorial Coliseum.

=== Season standings ===
Pacific Division	W	L	PCT	GB	Home	Road	Div
y-Seattle SuperSonics	52	30	.634	–	31–10	21–20	11–9
x-Phoenix Suns	50	32	.610	2	32–9	18–23	11–9
x-Los Angeles Lakers	47	35	.573	5	31–10	16–25	11–9
x-Portland Trail Blazers	45	37	.549	7	33–8	12–29	8–12
San Diego Clippers	43	39	.524	9	29–12	14–27	11–9
Golden State Warriors	38	44	.463	14	23–18	15–26	8–12

#	Western Conference				
#	Team	W	L	PCT	GB
1	z-Seattle SuperSonics	52	30	.634	–
2	y-Kansas City Kings	48	34	.585	4
3	x-Phoenix Suns	50	32	.610	2
4	x-Denver Nuggets	47	35	.573	5
5	x-Los Angeles Lakers	47	35	.573	5
6	x-Portland Trail Blazers	45	37	.549	7
7	San Diego Clippers	43	39	.524	9
8	Indiana Pacers	38	44	.463	14
9	Milwaukee Bucks	38	44	.463	14
10	Golden State Warriors	38	44	.463	14
11	Chicago Bulls	31	51	.378	21

z – clinched division title
y – clinched division title
x – clinched playoff spot

== Playoffs ==
1979 playoff game log
First round: 1–2 (home: 1–0; road: 0–2)

Game	Date	Team	Score	High points	High rebounds	High assists	Location Attendance	Series
1	April 2	@ Phoenix	L 103–107	Ron Brewer (26)	Thompson, Lucas (10)	Lucas, Brewer (5)	Arizona Veterans Memorial Coliseum; 12,660	0–1
2	April 4	Phoenix	W 96–92	Ron Brewer (21)	Mychal Thompson (17)	Maurice Lucas (4)	Memorial Coliseum; 12,666	1–1
3	April 6	@ Phoenix	L 91–101	three players tied (16)	Maurice Lucas (16)	Maurice Lucas (9)	Arizona Veterans Memorial Coliseum; 12,660	1–2

1979 schedule

== Awards and honors ==
- Mychal Thompson, All-NBA Rookie Team
- Ron Brewer, All-NBA Rookie Team
- Maurice Lucas, NBA All-Defensive Second Team
- Lionel Hollins, NBA All-Defensive Second Team
- Maurice Lucas, NBA All-Star
