= 1978–79 Milwaukee Bucks season =

NBA professional basketball team season

- Head coach: Don Nelson
- Arena: MECCA Arena

Results
- Record: 38–44 (.463)
- Place: Division: 5th (Midwest); Conference: 9th (Western)
- Playoff finish: Did not qualify
- Stats at Basketball Reference

Local media
- Television: WVTV
- Radio: WTMJ

The 1978–79 Milwaukee Bucks season was the Bucks' 11th season in the NBA.

== Draft picks ==
| Round | Pick | Player | Position | Nationality | College |
|---|---|---|---|---|---|
| 1 | 12 | George Johnson | PF | United States | St. John's |
| 3 | 59 | Pat Cummings | PF | United States | Cincinnati |
| 4 | 80 | Otis Howard | F | United States | Austin Peay State |
| 5 | 103 | Russ Coleman | | United States | Pacific |
| 6 | 124 | Dave Kyle | | United States | Cleveland State |
| 7 | 146 | Kim Anderson | | United States | Missouri |
| 8 | 164 | Tom Zaligaris | | United States | North Carolina |
| 9 | 182 | Gary Rosenberger | | United States | Marquette |
| 10 | 196 | Tom Anderson | | United States | Wisconsin-Green Bay |

== Roster ==
1978–79 Milwaukee Bucks roster
Players

| Pos. | No. | Player | Height | Weight | DOB | From |
|---|---|---|---|---|---|---|
| C | 54 | Kent Benson | 6 ft 10 in (2.08 m) | 235 lb (107 kg) | 1954–12–27 | Indiana |
| SF | 2 | Junior Bridgeman | 6 ft 5 in (1.96 m) | 210 lb (95 kg) | 1953–09–17 | Louisville |
| PG | 21 | Quinn Buckner | 6 ft 3 in (1.91 m) | 190 lb (86 kg) | 1954–08–20 | Indiana |
| C | 40 | John Gianelli | 6 ft 10 in (2.08 m) | 220 lb (100 kg) | 1950–06–10 | Pacific |
| SG | 20 | Ernie Grunfeld | 6 ft 6 in (1.98 m) | 210 lb (95 kg) | 1955–04–24 | Tennessee |
| F | 24 | George L. Johnson | 6 ft 7 in (2.01 m) | 210 lb (95 kg) | 1956–12–08 | St. John's |
| SF | 8 | Marques Johnson | 6 ft 7 in (2.01 m) | 218 lb (99 kg) | 1956–02–08 | UCLA |
| PF | 7 | Dave Meyers (injured) (IN) | 6 ft 8 in (2.03 m) | 215 lb (98 kg) | 1953–04–21 | UCLA |
| F | 18 | Kevin Restani | 6 ft 9 in (2.06 m) | 225 lb (102 kg) | 1951–12–23 | San Francisco |
| G | 5 | Sam Smith | 6 ft 4 in (1.93 m) | 200 lb (91 kg) | 1955–01–08 | UNLV |
| PG | 11 | Lloyd Walton | 6 ft 0 in (1.83 m) | 160 lb (73 kg) | 1953–11–23 | Marquette |
| SG | 32 | Brian Winters | 6 ft 4 in (1.93 m) | 185 lb (84 kg) | 1952–03–01 | South Carolina |

Coaches
Head coach
- Don Nelson
Assistant(s)
- John Killilea

Legend
- (DP) Unsigned draft pick
- (FA) Free agent
- (S) Suspended
- Injured

== Regular season ==
=== Season standings ===
| Midwest Division | W | L | PCT | GB | Home | Road | Div |
|---|---|---|---|---|---|---|---|
| y-Kansas City Kings | 48 | 34 | .585 | – | 32–9 | 16–25 | 12–4 |
| x-Denver Nuggets | 47 | 35 | .573 | 1 | 29–12 | 18–23 | 8–8 |
| Indiana Pacers | 38 | 44 | .463 | 10 | 25–16 | 13–28 | 6–10 |
| Milwaukee Bucks | 38 | 44 | .463 | 10 | 28–13 | 10–31 | 9–7 |
| Chicago Bulls | 31 | 51 | .378 | 17 | 19–22 | 12–29 | 5–11 |

| # | Western Conference | | | | |
| # | Team | W | L | PCT | GB |
|---|---|---|---|---|---|
| 1 | z-Seattle SuperSonics | 52 | 30 | .634 | – |
| 2 | y-Kansas City Kings | 48 | 34 | .585 | 4 |
| 3 | x-Phoenix Suns | 50 | 32 | .610 | 2 |
| 4 | x-Denver Nuggets | 47 | 35 | .573 | 5 |
| 5 | x-Los Angeles Lakers | 47 | 35 | .573 | 5 |
| 6 | x-Portland Trail Blazers | 45 | 37 | .549 | 7 |
| 7 | San Diego Clippers | 43 | 39 | .524 | 9 |
| 8 | Indiana Pacers | 38 | 44 | .463 | 14 |
| 9 | Milwaukee Bucks | 38 | 44 | .463 | 14 |
| 10 | Golden State Warriors | 38 | 44 | .463 | 14 |
| 11 | Chicago Bulls | 31 | 51 | .378 | 21 |

z - clinched division title
y - clinched division title
x - clinched playoff spot

=== Game log ===
1978–79 game log
Total: 38–44 (Home: 0–0; Road: 0–0)
October: 3–2 (home: 1–1; road: 2–1)

| Game | Date | Team | Score | High points | High rebounds | High assists | Location Attendance | Record |
|---|---|---|---|---|---|---|---|---|
| 1 | October 14, 1978 | @ San Antonio | L 111–153 | | | | HemisFair Arena | 0–1 |
| 2 | October 15, 1978 | @ New Orleans | W 123–112 | | | | Louisiana Superdome | 1—1 |
| 3 | October 20, 1978 | New York | L 105–115 | | | | MECCA Arena | 1—2 |
| 4 | October 21, 1978 | @ Kansas City | W 103–99 | | | | Kemper Arena | 2—2 |
| 5 | October 22, 1978 | Golden State | W 109–107 | | | | MECCA Arena | 3—2 |
| 6 | October 24, 1978 | @ Phoenix | L 116–124 | | | | Arizona Veterans Memorial Coliseum | 3—3 |

November: 0–0 (home: 0–0; road: 0–0)

| Game | Date | Team | Score | High points | High rebounds | High assists | Location Attendance | Record |

December: 0–0 (home: 0–0; road: 0–0)

| Game | Date | Team | Score | High points | High rebounds | High assists | Location Attendance | Record |

January: 0–0 (home: 0–0; road: 0–0)

| Game | Date | Team | Score | High points | High rebounds | High assists | Location Attendance | Record |

February: 0–0 (home: 0–0; road: 0–0)

| Game | Date | Team | Score | High points | High rebounds | High assists | Location Attendance | Record |

March: 0–0 (home: 0–0; road: 0–0)

| Game | Date | Team | Score | High points | High rebounds | High assists | Location Attendance | Record |

1978–79 schedule

== Playoffs ==
After making the playoffs in 1978, the Bucks failed to qualify for the playoffs.

== Player statistics ==
Legend
| GP | Games played | GS | Games started | MPG | Minutes per game |
| FG% | Field-goal percentage | 3P% | 3-point field-goal percentage | FT% | Free-throw percentage |
| RPG | Rebounds per game | APG | Assists per game | SPG | Steals per game |
| BPG | Blocks per game | PPG | Points per game |

Statistics
| Player | GP | GS | MPG | FG% | 3FG% | FT% | RPG | APG | SPG | BPG | PPG |
|---|---|---|---|---|---|---|---|---|---|---|---|
| Marques Johnson | 77 | | 36.1 | 55.0 | | 76.0 | 7.6 | 3.0 | 1.5 | 1.2 | 25.6 |
| Brian Winters | 79 | | 32.6 | 49.3 | | 85.6 | 2.2 | 4.8 | 1.1 | 0.5 | 19.8 |
| Junior Bridgeman | 82 | | 23.9 | 50.6 | | 82.9 | 3.6 | 2.0 | 1.1 | 0.5 | 15.5 |
| Kent Benson | 82 | | 26.0 | 51.8 | | 73.5 | 7.1 | 2.5 | 1.1 | 1.0 | 12.3 |
| Ernie Grunfeld | 82 | | 21.7 | 49.3 | | 76.1 | 4.4 | 2.6 | 0.7 | 0.2 | 10.3 |
| Quinn Buckner | 81 | | 21.7 | 45.4 | | 63.2 | 2.6 | 5.8 | 1.9 | 0.2 | 7.2 |
| John Gianelli | 82 | | 25.1 | 48.6 | | 70.6 | 5.0 | 2.0 | 0.5 | 0.7 | 7.1 |
| Kevin Restani | 81 | | 19.7 | 49.5 | | 69.9 | 4.8 | 1.5 | 0.4 | 0.3 | 7.1 |
| George Johnson | 67 | | 17.3 | 48.2 | | 71.8 | 5.4 | 1.2 | 1.1 | 0.7 | 6.2 |
| Lloyd Walton | 75 | | 18.4 | 48.0 | | 67.8 | 1.4 | 4.7 | 1.0 | 0.1 | 5.0 |
| Sam Smith | 16 | | 7.8 | 40.4 | | 75.0 | 0.6 | 1.0 | 0.5 | 0.4 | 3.5 |
| Otis Howard | 3 | | 7.3 | 45.5 | | 0.0 | 2.3 | 0.3 | 0.0 | 0.0 | 3.3 |
| Norm Van Lier | 38 | | 14.6 | 39.0 | | 90.4 | 1.1 | 4.2 | 1.1 | 0.1 | 2.8 |
| Del Beshore | 1 | | 1.0 | 0.0 | | 0.0 | 0.0 | 0.0 | 0.0 | 0.0 | 0.0 |

== Transactions ==
=== Trades ===
July 26, 1978

October 23, 1978

To Milwaukee Bucks----
- C. J. Kupec
To Milwaukee Bucks----
- 1979 4th round pick (Eugene Robinson)
To Houston Rockets----
- 1979 4th round pick (Sammy Drummer)
To Detroit Pistons----
- Otis Howard

=== Free agents ===
| Player | Signed | Former team |
| Del Beshore | September 14, 1978 | California University of Pennsylvania |
| Norm Van Lier | October 26, 1978 | Chicago Bulls |

== Awards and records ==
- Marques Johnson, All-NBA First Team
