= 1978–79 Indiana Pacers season =

NBA professional basketball team season

- Head coach: Bobby Leonard
- Arena: Market Square Arena

Results
- Record: 38–44 (.463)
- Place: Division: 3rd (Midwest); Conference: 8th (Western)
- Playoff finish: Did not qualify
- Stats at Basketball Reference

Local media
- Television: WTTV
- Radio: WIBC

The 1978–79 Indiana Pacers season was Indiana's third season in the NBA and 12th season as a franchise. This would be the final season of the team in the Western Conference, as they switched to the Eastern Conference the next season.

== Offseason ==
=== Draft picks ===
This table only lists picks through the second round.

Round	Pick	Player	Position	Nationality	College
1	3	Rick Robey	PF/C	United States	Kentucky
2	27	Wayne Radford	SG	United States	Indiana

== Roster ==
Indiana Pacers roster
Players

Pos.	No.	Player	Height	Weight	DOB	From
PF	42	Mike Bantom	6 ft 9 in (2.06 m)	200 lb (91 kg)		Saint Joseph's
SF	10	Corky Calhoun	6 ft 7 in (2.01 m)	210 lb (95 kg)		Penn
PG	20	Brad Davis	6 ft 3 in (1.91 m)	180 lb (82 kg)		Maryland
PG	16	Johnny Davis	6 ft 2 in (1.88 m)	170 lb (77 kg)		Dayton
C	40	James Edwards	7 ft 0 in (2.13 m)	225 lb (102 kg)		Washington
C	41	Len Elmore	6 ft 9 in (2.06 m)	220 lb (100 kg)		Maryland
SF	22	Alex English	6 ft 7 in (2.01 m)	190 lb (86 kg)		South Carolina
SF	24	Steve Green	6 ft 7 in (2.01 m)	220 lb (100 kg)		Indiana
SF	25	Billy Knight	6 ft 6 in (1.98 m)	195 lb (88 kg)		Pittsburgh
SG	21	Wayne Radford	6 ft 3 in (1.91 m)	205 lb (93 kg)		Indiana
SG	14	Ricky Sobers	6 ft 3 in (1.91 m)	198 lb (90 kg)		UNLV

Coaches
Head coach
- Slick Leonard
Assistant(s)
- Jerry Oliver

Legend
- (DP) Unsigned draft pick
- (FA) Free agent
- (S) Suspended
- Injured

== Regular season ==
=== Season standings ===
Midwest Division	W	L	PCT	GB	Home	Road	Div
y-Kansas City Kings	48	34	.585	–	32–9	16–25	12–4
x-Denver Nuggets	47	35	.573	1	29–12	18–23	8–8
Indiana Pacers	38	44	.463	10	25–16	13–28	6–10
Milwaukee Bucks	38	44	.463	10	28–13	10–31	9–7
Chicago Bulls	31	51	.378	17	19–22	12–29	5–11

#	Western Conference				
#	Team	W	L	PCT	GB
1	z-Seattle SuperSonics	52	30	.634	–
2	y-Kansas City Kings	48	34	.585	4
3	x-Phoenix Suns	50	32	.610	2
4	x-Denver Nuggets	47	35	.573	5
5	x-Los Angeles Lakers	47	35	.573	5
6	x-Portland Trail Blazers	45	37	.549	7
7	San Diego Clippers	43	39	.524	9
8	Indiana Pacers	38	44	.463	14
9	Milwaukee Bucks	38	44	.463	14
10	Golden State Warriors	38	44	.463	14
11	Chicago Bulls	31	51	.378	21

z - clinched division title
y - clinched division title
x - clinched playoff spot

== Player statistics ==
=== Ragular season ===
Player	POS	GP	GS	MP	REB	AST	STL	BLK	PTS	MPG	RPG	APG	SPG	BPG	PPG
James Edwards	C	82	82	2,546	693	92	60	109	1,366	31.0	8.5	1.1	.7	1.3	16.7
Ricky Sobers	SG	81		2,825	301	450	138	23	1,404	34.9	3.7	5.6	1.7	.3	17.3
Alex English	SF	81		2,696	655	271	70	78	1,299	33.3	8.1	3.3	.9	1.0	16.0
Mike Bantom	PF	81		2,528	650	223	99	62	1,191	31.2	8.0	2.8	1.2	.8	14.7
Corky Calhoun	SF	81		1,332	238	104	37	19	378	16.4	2.9	1.3	.5	.2	4.7
Len Elmore	C	80		1,264	402	75	62	79	334	15.8	5.0	.9	.8	1.0	4.2
Johnny Davis	PG	79		2,971	191	453	95	22	1,444	37.6	2.4	5.7	1.2	.3	18.3
Wayne Radford	SG	52		649	68	57	30	1	202	12.5	1.3	1.1	.6	.0	3.9
Kevin Stacom^{†}	SG	44		571	61	77	14	1	183	13.0	1.4	1.8	.3	.0	4.2
Rick Robey^{†}	C	43		849	254	53	25	12	370	19.7	5.9	1.2	.6	.3	8.6
Billy Knight^{†}	SF	39		976	174	86	32	5	575	25.0	4.5	2.2	.8	.1	14.7
Steve Green	SF	39		265	52	21	11	3	104	6.8	1.3	.5	.3	.1	2.7
Brad Davis^{†}	PG	22		233	16	43	14	2	59	10.6	.7	2.0	.6	.1	2.7

- ^{†} Denotes player spent time with another team in the season. Stats reflect time with the Pacers only.

== Awards and records ==
- Don Buse, NBA All-Defensive First Team
