= John Olive =

American basketball player and coach

Personal information
- Born: March 1, 1955 (age 71) Philadelphia, Pennsylvania, U.S.
- Listed height: 6 ft 7 in (2.01 m)
- Listed weight: 210 lb (95 kg)

Career information
- High school: Bishop Eustace Preparatory (Pennsauken, New Jersey)
- College: Villanova (1973–1977)
- NBA draft: 1977: 8th round, 168th overall pick
- Drafted by: Philadelphia 76ers
- Playing career: 1978–1981
- Position: Small forward
- Number: 40
- Coaching career: 1985–1997

Career history

Playing
- 1978–1979: San Diego Clippers
- 1980–1981: Alberta Dusters

Coaching
- 1985–1992: Villanova (assistant)
- 1992–1997: Loyola Marymount

Career highlights
- As coach: WCC Coach of the Year (1996)
- Stats at NBA.com
- Stats at Basketball Reference

John Olive (born March 1, 1955) is an American former basketball player and coach. Olive attended Bishop Eustace Preparatory School, in Pennsauken, New Jersey, then played collegiate basketball at Villanova University, where he graduated in 1977.

Olive was drafted in the eighth round of the 1977 NBA draft by the Philadelphia 76ers. He played in the NBA for the San Diego Clippers from 1978 through 1980. He also played for the Alberta Dusters in the Continental Basketball Association (CBA) in the 1980–81 season.

Olive was an assistant coach at Villanova under Rollie Massimino, from 1985 to 1992. He was named head coach at Loyola Marymount in 1992, where he served for five seasons.

Olive is currently the Head Boys Basketball Coach at Torrey Pines High School in Del Mar, California.

At Torrey Pines High School, Olive has led the Falcons to unprecedented success. Since taking over at Torrey Pines Olive has won 583 games. Olive has won 19 league championships, including 10 in a row. In his time with the Falcons Olive has won 4 CIF San Diego Section Championships.

== Career statistics ==
Legend
GP	Games played	GS	Games started	MPG	Minutes per game
FG%	Field goal percentage	3P%	3-point field goal percentage	FT%	Free throw percentage
RPG	Rebounds per game	APG	Assists per game	SPG	Steals per game
BPG	Blocks per game	PPG	Points per game	**Bold**	Career high

=== NBA ===
==== Regular season ====
Year	Team	GP	MPG	FG%	3P%	FT%	RPG	APG	SPG	BPG	PPG
1978–79	San Diego	**34**	5.6	**.325**		**.783**	.6	**.1**	**.1**	.0	**1.3**
1979–80	San Diego	1	**15.0**	.000	–	–	**1.0**	.0	.0	.0	.0
Career		35	5.8	.310	–	.783	.6	.1	.1	.0	1.3
