= Delmer Beshore =

American basketball player

Personal information
- Born: November 29, 1956 (age 69) Mechanicsburg, Pennsylvania, U.S.
- Listed height: 5 ft 11 in (1.80 m)
- Listed weight: 165 lb (75 kg)

Career information
- High school: Red Land (New Cumberland, Pennsylvania)
- College: California (Pennsylvania) (1974–1978)
- NBA draft: 1978: undrafted
- Playing career: 1978–1985
- Position: Point guard
- Number: 12, 1

Career history
- 1978: Milwaukee Bucks
- 1978–1979: Fresno Stars
- 1979–1980: Chicago Bulls
- 1980–1982: Basket Rimini
- 1983–1985: Wyoming Wildcatters
- 1988: Fresno Flames

Career highlights
- All-CBA Second Team (1984); CBA All-Defensive First Team (1984); CBA assists leader (1985); CBA steals leader (1984)
- Stats at NBA.com
- Stats at Basketball Reference

Delmer Beshore (born November 29, 1956) is an American former professional basketball player, formerly in the National Basketball Association (NBA). Born in Mechanicsburg, Pennsylvania, he played college basketball with California University of Pennsylvania.

== Biography ==
Beshore, a 5'11" and 165 lb point guard, spent the 1978–79 NBA season with the Milwaukee Bucks, appearing in one minute of one game and registering no statistics. His final NBA season, in 1979–80, was spent with the Chicago Bulls, with whom he averaged 3.6 points per game in 68 contests. He was selected by the Dallas Mavericks in the 1980 NBA expansion draft but did not end up playing with them.

Beshore also played in Italy with Sacramora Basket Rimini, with the Fresno Stars of the Western Basketball Association, and in 1984 was a player-coach with the Wyoming Wildcatters of the Continental Basketball Association (CBA). Beshore was selected to the All-CBA Second Team and All-Defensive First Team in 1984.

He is currently an assistant coach for Fresno Pacific University, where he has been since 1998.

== NBA career statistics ==
Legend
GP	Games played	GS	Games started	MPG	Minutes per game
FG%	Field goal percentage	3P%	3-point field goal percentage	FT%	Free throw percentage
RPG	Rebounds per game	APG	Assists per game	SPG	Steals per game
BPG	Blocks per game	PPG	Points per game	**Bold**	Career high

=== Regular season ===
Year	Team	GP	GS	MPG	FG%	3P%	FT%	RPG	APG	SPG	BPG	PPG
1978–79	Milwaukee	1		1.0	.000	.000	.000	0.0	0.0	0.0	0.0	0.0
1979–80	Chicago	**68**		**12.8**	**.352**	**.385**	**.667**	**0.9**	**2.0**	**0.9**	**0.1**	**3.6**
Career		69	0	12.6	.352	.385	.667	0.9	2.0	0.8	0.1	3.5
