= Donnie Walsh =

American basketball coach and executive

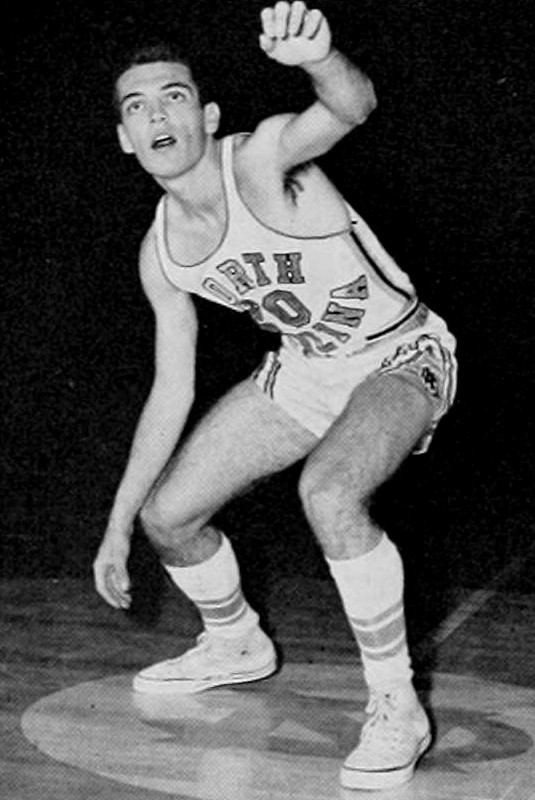
- Walsh, circa 1961

Indiana Pacers
- Position: Front office adviser
- League: NBA

Personal information
- Born: March 1, 1941 (age 85) Manhattan, New York City, U.S.

Career information
- High school: Fordham Preparatory School
- College: University of North Carolina
- NBA draft: 1962: 11th round
- Drafted by: San Francisco Warriors

Career history
- 1970–1973: University of South Carolina (assistant coach)
- 1977–1978: Denver Nuggets (assistant coach)
- 1979–1980: Denver Nuggets (head coach)
- 1984–1986: Indiana Pacers (assistant coach)
- 1986–2006: Indiana Pacers (General Manager)
- 2007–2008: Indiana Pacers (CEO)
- 2008–2011: New York Knicks (President of Basketball Operations)
- 2012–2013: Indiana Pacers (President of Basketball Operations)
- Stats at Basketball Reference

Joseph Donald Walsh Jr. (born March 1, 1941) is a front office adviser of the Indiana Pacers and a former professional basketball coach. He also served as President of Basketball Operations for the New York Knicks and Indiana Pacers.

== Early life and education ==
Walsh was born in Manhattan, New York City, and attended Fordham Preparatory School in the Bronx, New York City. Walsh was recruited to play college basketball at the University of North Carolina for then head coach Frank McGuire. After McGuire was forced out following NCAA violations, Walsh was a senior captain on Dean Smith's first team in 1961. Walsh was selected by the San Francisco Warriors in the 11th round of the 1962 NBA draft (after the Warriors moved from Philadelphia), but never played in the NBA. Walsh earned both a bachelor's degree and a law degree at UNC. While attending law school, he served as an assistant coach on Coach Dean Smith's staff at UNC. He turned down opportunities to practice law in New York City in order to continue to coach basketball.

== Career ==
=== College coaching ===
Walsh served as an assistant coach for several college teams, including twelve seasons at the University of South Carolina, working with McGuire, who was the Gamecocks' head coach. He helped South Carolina to an undefeated ACC regular season in 1970, an ACC Tournament championship in 1971, and three consecutive Sweet 16 appearances from 1971 to 1973.

=== NBA coaching and management ===
==== Denver Nuggets ====
Walsh was hired as an assistant with the Denver Nuggets by Larry Brown in 1977. He became the head coach of the Nuggets in 1979 and held the position for a year and a half, being replaced with Doug Moe in 1980.

==== Indiana Pacers ====
In 1984, he became an assistant with the Indiana Pacers. He was later named general manager of the Pacers on April 21, 1986. In 1987, he made the then-controversial decision to select Reggie Miller in the NBA Draft over local hero Steve Alford of Indiana University. The decision later proved to be prescient, as Miller had a Hall of Fame NBA career whereas Alford was a bust in the pros. He was later promoted to the position of CEO and president and held that position until shortly before the end of the 2007–08 season. During his first tenure with the Pacers, the team reached the playoffs 17 times, the Eastern Conference finals six times (1994, 1995, 1998, 1999, 2000, 2004), the NBA finals once (2000), and were Central Division Champions four times. In 2001 with the Pacers, he was named the Bloomberg News Service NBA Top Basketball Executive. During his time as the president and CEO, he oversaw all operations of the Pacers Foundation, Indiana Fever (WNBA), and Conseco Fieldhouse.

==== New York Knicks ====
On April 2, 2008, the New York Knicks announced that Walsh had agreed to become their president of basketball operations. Walsh immediately recognized the expensive long-term contracts the Knicks carried. On November 21, 2008, he traded Jamal Crawford for Al Harrington of the Golden State Warriors. Then, he traded Mardy Collins and Zach Randolph for Cuttino Mobley and Tim Thomas of the Los Angeles Clippers. Though Mobley retired of a heart condition, his contract, as well as those of Harrington and Thomas, expired at the end of the 2009–2010 NBA season, decreasing the Knicks' payroll by $27 million and giving them enough cap space to sign anyone notable from the heralded free agent class of 2010 which included NBA players such as LeBron James, Dwyane Wade, Chris Bosh, Amar'e Stoudemire, and Joe Johnson.

Walsh's first major signing came on July 8, 2010, when he signed Amar'e Stoudemire to a five-year, $100 million contract. In the 2010–2011 season, Walsh made a multi-player trade with Denver involving star players Carmelo Anthony and Chauncey Billups coming to the Knicks in exchange for a few players, including Raymond Felton and Danilo Gallinari, and undisclosed amounts of cash.

On June 3, 2011, Walsh resigned as general manager, but remained with the team as a consultant.

==== Return to the Pacers ====
On June 27, 2012, Walsh returned to the Pacers as President of Basketball Operations as Larry Bird stepped down. In 2013, Walsh helped the Pacers win the Central Division and reach the NBA Eastern Conference finals, where the team lost to eventual NBA Champion Miami Heat.

On June 27, 2013, Bird returned to the Pacers as President of Basketball Operations; Walsh stepped down from his role as president and accepted a position as a consultant. Walsh still attends Pacers games, usually seated near Bird and team general manager Kevin Pritchard.

== Head coaching record ==
| Team | Year | G | W | L | W–L% | Finish | PG | PW | PL | PW–L% | Result |
|---|---|---|---|---|---|---|---|---|---|---|---|
| Denver | 1978–79 | 29 | 19 | 10 | .655 | 2nd in Midwest | 3 | 1 | 2 | .333 | Lost Western first round |
| Denver | 1979–80 | 82 | 30 | 52 | .366 | 4th in Midwest | — | — | — | — | Missed playoffs |
| Denver | 1980–81 | 31 | 11 | 20 | .355 | — | — | — | — | — | — |
| Career | | 142 | 60 | 82 | .423 | | 3 | 1 | 2 | .333 | |

| Preceded by Isiah Thomas | New York Knicks President; 2008–2011 | Succeeded by Glen Grunwald |
