= 1978–79 Golden State Warriors season =

NBA professional basketball team season

- Head coach: Al Attles
- General manager: Al Attles
- Owner: Franklin Mieuli
- Arena: Oakland-Alameda County Coliseum Arena

Results
- Record: 38–44 (.463)
- Place: Division: 6th (Pacific); Conference: 10th (Western)
- Playoff finish: Did not qualify
- Stats at Basketball Reference

The 1978–79 Golden State Warriors season was the Warriors' 33rd season in the NBA and 16th in the San Francisco Bay Area.

== Draft picks ==
Round	Pick	Player	Position	Nationality	College
1	5	Purvis Short	SF	United States	Jackson State
1	22	Raymond Townsend	PG	United States	UCLA
2	40	Wayne Cooper	C	United States	New Orleans
3	56	Steve Neff		United States	Southern Nazarene
4	77	Derrick Jackson		United States	Georgetown
5	101	Bubba Wilson		United States	Western Carolina
6	122	Buzz Hartnett		United States	San Diego
7	142	Rick Bernard		United States	St. Mary's (CA)
8	163	Tony Searcy		United States	Appalachian State
9	179	Bobby Humbles		United States	Bradley
10	193	Mike Muff		United States	Murray State

== Roster ==
1978–79 Golden State Warriors roster
Players

Pos.	No.	Player	Height	Weight	DOB	From
PF	5	Tom Abernethy	6 ft 7 in (2.01 m)	220 lb (100 kg)	1954-05-06	Indiana
C	43	Wayne Cooper	6 ft 10 in (2.08 m)	220 lb (100 kg)	1956-11-16	New Orleans
SF	41	Wesley Cox	6 ft 6 in (1.98 m)	215 lb (98 kg)	1955-01-27	Louisville
SF	32	Ray Epps	6 ft 6 in (1.98 m)	195 lb (88 kg)	1956-08-20	Norfolk State
PG	4	John Lucas II	6 ft 3 in (1.91 m)	175 lb (79 kg)	1953-10-31	Maryland
C	00	Robert Parish	7 ft 1 in (2.16 m)	230 lb (104 kg)	1953-08-30	Centenary
SF	22	Sonny Parker	6 ft 6 in (1.98 m)	200 lb (91 kg)	1955-03-22	Texas A&M
C	44	Clifford Ray	6 ft 9 in (2.06 m)	230 lb (104 kg)	1949-01-21	Oklahoma
SG	25	Tony Robertson	6 ft 4 in (1.93 m)	195 lb (88 kg)	1956-01-01	West Virginia
PF	45	Purvis Short	6 ft 7 in (2.01 m)	210 lb (95 kg)	1957-07-02	Jackson State
SG	20	Phil Smith	6 ft 4 in (1.93 m)	185 lb (84 kg)	1952-04-22	San Francisco
SG	11	Raymond Townsend	6 ft 3 in (1.91 m)	175 lb (79 kg)	1955-12-20	UCLA
PG	10	Jo Jo White	6 ft 3 in (1.91 m)	190 lb (86 kg)	1946-11-16	Kansas
SG	33	Nate Williams	6 ft 5 in (1.96 m)	215 lb (98 kg)	1950-05-02	Utah State

Coaches
Head coach
- Al Attles
Assistant(s)
- Joe Roberts

Legend
- (DP) Unsigned draft pick
- (FA) Free agent
- (S) Suspended
- Injured

Roster
Updated: February 20, 1979

== Regular season ==
=== Season standings ===
Pacific Division	W	L	PCT	GB	Home	Road	Div
y-Seattle SuperSonics	52	30	.634	–	31–10	21–20	11–9
x-Phoenix Suns	50	32	.610	2	32–9	18–23	11–9
x-Los Angeles Lakers	47	35	.573	5	31–10	16–25	11–9
x-Portland Trail Blazers	45	37	.549	7	33–8	12–29	8–12
San Diego Clippers	43	39	.524	9	29–12	14–27	11–9
Golden State Warriors	38	44	.463	14	23–18	15–26	8–12

#	Western Conference				
#	Team	W	L	PCT	GB
1	z-Seattle SuperSonics	52	30	.634	–
2	y-Kansas City Kings	48	34	.585	4
3	x-Phoenix Suns	50	32	.610	2
4	x-Denver Nuggets	47	35	.573	5
5	x-Los Angeles Lakers	47	35	.573	5
6	x-Portland Trail Blazers	45	37	.549	7
7	San Diego Clippers	43	39	.524	9
8	Indiana Pacers	38	44	.463	14
9	Milwaukee Bucks	38	44	.463	14
10	Golden State Warriors	38	44	.463	14
11	Chicago Bulls	31	51	.378	21

z - clinched division title
y - clinched division title
x - clinched playoff spot
