= Bob Bigelow =

American basketball player (1953–2020)

Personal information
- Born: December 26, 1953 Boston, Massachusetts, U.S.
- Died: August 18, 2020 (aged 66) Winchester, Massachusetts
- Listed height: 6 ft 7 in (2.01 m)
- Listed weight: 215 lb (98 kg)

Career information
- High school: Winchester (Winchester, Massachusetts)
- College: Penn (1972–1975)
- NBA draft: 1975: 1st round, 13th overall pick
- Drafted by: Kansas City Kings
- Playing career: 1975–1979
- Position: Small forward
- Number: 11, 52, 32

Career history
- 1975–1978: Kansas City Kings
- 1978: Carolina Lightning
- 1978: Boston Celtics
- 1978–1979: San Diego Clippers

Career highlights
- Second-team All-Ivy League (1975)
- Stats at NBA.com
- Stats at Basketball Reference

Robert S. Bigelow (December 26, 1953 – August 18, 2020) was an American basketball player in the National Basketball Association (NBA). A forward born in Boston, Massachusetts, raised and played high school basketball in Winchester, and played college basketball for the Penn Quakers under future Hall-of-Fame coach Chuck Daly. He played for the Boston Celtics and San Diego Clippers after playing for the Kansas City Kings for 3 seasons.

He was a published author, having written the 2001 book Just Let the Kids Play and the 2016 e-book Youth Sports: Still Failing Our Kids – How to Really Fix It. In addition, Bob Bigelow was a prolific speaker to communities, and at major conferences, advocating for improving youth sports via better coach education and playing models for children. During his 30-plus year career, he gave over 2,500 talks and coaches clinics to communities throughout the United States, and internationally. He was also selected as one of the “100 Most Influential Sports Educators” by the Institute for International Sport at the University of Rhode Island.

Bigelow died on August 18, 2020.

== Career statistics ==
Legend
GP	Games played	GS	Games started	MPG	Minutes per game
FG%	Field goal percentage	3P%	3-point field goal percentage	FT%	Free throw percentage
RPG	Rebounds per game	APG	Assists per game	SPG	Steals per game
BPG	Blocks per game	PPG	Points per game	**Bold**	Career high

=== NBA ===
==== Regular season ====
Year	Team	GP	MPG	FG%	FT%	RPG	APG	SPG	BPG	PPG
1975–76	Kansas City	**31**	5.3	.340	.727	.9	.3	.1	.0	1.8
1976–77	Kansas City	29	5.6	.500	**.882**	.9	.3	.1	.0	**2.9**
1977–78	Kansas City	1	7.0	**1.000**	–	**5.0**	.0	.0	.0	2.0
1977–78	Boston	4	4.3	.250	–	1.0	.0	.0	.0	1.5
1978–79	San Diego	29	**14.2**	.400	.619	1.6	**.9**	**.4**	**.1**	**2.9**
Career		94	8.1	.414	.732	1.2	.4	.2	.0	2.5
