= 1978–79 Los Angeles Lakers season =

NBA professional basketball team season

- Head coach: Jerry West
- General manager: Bill Sharman
- Owner: Jack Kent Cooke
- Arena: The Forum

Results
- Record: 47–35 (.573)
- Place: Division: 3rd (Pacific); Conference: 5th (Western)
- Playoff finish: Conference semifinals (lost to SuperSonics 1–4)
- Stats at Basketball Reference

Local media
- Television: KHJ-TV
- Radio: KLAC

The 1978–79 Los Angeles Lakers season was the Lakers' 31st season in the NBA and 19th season in Los Angeles.

The Lakers improved their win total from the prior year to 47–35, but lost once again in the postseason to division rival Seattle, who would win the title that year.

It was the final season for the team under the ownership of Jack Kent Cooke, who sold the team to Jerry Buss the following summer. It was also the final season for former Laker legend Jerry West as coach; he returned to the organization three years later as general manager.

== Offseason ==
=== Draft picks ===
Round	Pick	Player	Nationality	College
2	26	Ron Carter	United States	Virginia Military
2	38	Lew Massey	United States	North Carolina
3	60	Michael Cooper	United States	New Mexico
4	82	Harold Robertson	United States	Lincoln University
5	104	Carlos Terry	United States	Winston-Salem
6	126	Kim Stewart	United States	Washington
7	147	Larry Paige	United States	Colorado

== Roster ==
1978–79 Los Angeles Lakers roster
Players

Pos.	No.	Player	Height	Weight	DOB	From
C	33	Kareem Abdul-Jabbar	7 ft 2 in (2.18 m)	225 lb (102 kg)	1947-04-16	UCLA
SG	24	Ron Boone	6 ft 2 in (1.88 m)	200 lb (91 kg)	1946-09-06	Idaho State
PF	2	Kenny Carr	6 ft 7 in (2.01 m)	220 lb (100 kg)	1955-08-15	NC State
SG	15	Ron Carter	6 ft 5 in (1.96 m)	190 lb (86 kg)	1956-08-31	VMI
SG	21	Michael Cooper	6 ft 5 in (1.96 m)	170 lb (77 kg)	1956-04-15	New Mexico
SF	4	Adrian Dantley	6 ft 5 in (1.96 m)	208 lb (94 kg)	1955-02-28	Notre Dame
PF	35	Don Ford	6 ft 9 in (2.06 m)	215 lb (98 kg)	1952-12-31	UC Santa Barbara
SG	23	Lou Hudson	6 ft 5 in (1.96 m)	210 lb (95 kg)	1944-07-11	Minnesota
PG	10	Norm Nixon	6 ft 2 in (1.88 m)	170 lb (77 kg)	1955-10-11	Duquesne
PG	5	Jim Price	6 ft 3 in (1.91 m)	195 lb (88 kg)	1949-11-27	Louisville
C	40	Dave Robisch	6 ft 10 in (2.08 m)	235 lb (107 kg)	1949-12-22	Kansas
SF	52	Jamaal Wilkes	6 ft 6 in (1.98 m)	190 lb (86 kg)	1953-05-02	UCLA

Coaches
Head coach
- Jerry West
Assistant(s)
- Stan Albeck
- Jack McCloskey

Legend
- (DP) Unsigned draft pick
- (FA) Free agent
- (S) Suspended
- Injured

Roster
Updated: October 27, 1978

== Regular season ==
=== Season standings ===
Pacific Division	W	L	PCT	GB	Home	Road	Div
y-Seattle SuperSonics	52	30	.634	–	31–10	21–20	11–9
x-Phoenix Suns	50	32	.610	2	32–9	18–23	11–9
x-Los Angeles Lakers	47	35	.573	5	31–10	16–25	11–9
x-Portland Trail Blazers	45	37	.549	7	33–8	12–29	8–12
San Diego Clippers	43	39	.524	9	29–12	14–27	11–9
Golden State Warriors	38	44	.463	14	23–18	15–26	8–12

#	Western Conference				
#	Team	W	L	PCT	GB
1	z-Seattle SuperSonics	52	30	.634	–
2	y-Kansas City Kings	48	34	.585	4
3	x-Phoenix Suns	50	32	.610	2
4	x-Denver Nuggets	47	35	.573	5
5	x-Los Angeles Lakers	47	35	.573	5
6	x-Portland Trail Blazers	45	37	.549	7
7	San Diego Clippers	43	39	.524	9
8	Indiana Pacers	38	44	.463	14
9	Milwaukee Bucks	38	44	.463	14
10	Golden State Warriors	38	44	.463	14
11	Chicago Bulls	31	51	.378	21

z - clinched division title
y - clinched division title
x - clinched playoff spot

== Playoffs ==
1979 playoff game log
First Round: 2–1 (home: 1–0; road: 1–1)

Game	Date	Team	Score	High points	High rebounds	High assists	Location Attendance	Series
1	April 10	@ Denver	L 105–110	Kareem Abdul-Jabbar (23)	Kareem Abdul-Jabbar (12)	Norm Nixon (11)	McNichols Sports Arena; 16,011	0–1
2	April 13	Denver	W 121–109	Kareem Abdul-Jabbar (32)	Jamaal Wilkes (13)	Norm Nixon (16)	The Forum; 14,182	1–1
3	April 16	@ Denver	W 112–111	Kareem Abdul-Jabbar (29)	Kareem Abdul-Jabbar (16)	Norm Nixon (12)	McNichols Sports Arena; 16,181	2–1

Conference semifinals: 1–4 (home: 1–1; road: 0–3)

Game	Date	Team	Score	High points	High rebounds	High assists	Location Attendance	Series
1	April 17	@ Seattle	L 101–112	Kareem Abdul-Jabbar (25)	Kareem Abdul-Jabbar (11)	Norm Nixon (7)	Kingdome; 26,377	0–1
2	April 18	@ Seattle	L 103–108 (OT)	Kareem Abdul-Jabbar (31)	Kareem Abdul-Jabbar (15)	Norm Nixon (10)	Kingdome; 26,862	0–2
3	April 20	Seattle	W 118–112 (OT)	Kareem Abdul-Jabbar (32)	Jamaal Wilkes (9)	Norm Nixon (11)	The Forum; 17,505	1–2
4	April 22	Seattle	L 115–117	Kareem Abdul-Jabbar (31)	Kareem Abdul-Jabbar (13)	Norm Nixon (19)	The Forum; 17,505	1–3
5	April 25	@ Seattle	L 100–106	Kareem Abdul-Jabbar (25)	Kareem Abdul-Jabbar (14)	Abdul-Jabbar, Nixon (8)	Seattle Center Coliseum; 14,098	1–4

1979 schedule

== Awards and records ==
- Kareem Abdul-Jabbar, All-NBA Second Team
- Kareem Abdul-Jabbar, NBA All-Defensive First Team
- Kareem Abdul-Jabbar, NBA All-Star Game
