= Coniel Norman =

American basketball player (1953–2022)

Personal information
- Born: September 24, 1953 Detroit, Michigan, U.S.
- Died: March 7, 2022 (aged 68) Los Angeles, California, U.S.
- Listed height: 6 ft 3 in (1.91 m)
- Listed weight: 175 lb (79 kg)

Career information
- High school: Kettering (Detroit, Michigan)
- College: Arizona (1972–1974)
- NBA draft: 1973: 3rd round, 37th overall pick
- Drafted by: Philadelphia 76ers
- Playing career: 1974–1980
- Position: Shooting guard
- Number: 22, 11

Career history
- 1974–1976: Philadelphia 76ers
- 1976–1977: Allentown Jets
- 1977–1978: Lancaster Red Roses
- 1978–1979: San Diego Clippers
- 1979–1980: Lancaster Red Roses

Career highlights
- All-EBA First Team (1978)
- Stats at NBA.com
- Stats at Basketball Reference

Coniel Norman (September 24, 1953 - March 7, 2022) was an American professional basketball player who played 99 NBA games.

Norman played in the Eastern Basketball Association (EBA) / Continental Basketball Association (CBA) for the Allentown Jets during the 1976–77 season and the Lancaster Red Roses during the 1977–78 and 1979–80 seasons. He was selected to the All-EBA First Team in 1978.

He then served in the United States Army, lost touch with his family and friends and lived homeless for 27 years. In 2010, he was reunited with his family.

== Career statistics ==
Legend
GP	Games played	GS	Games started	MPG	Minutes per game
FG%	Field goal percentage	3P%	3-point field goal percentage	FT%	Free throw percentage
RPG	Rebounds per game	APG	Assists per game	SPG	Steals per game
BPG	Blocks per game	PPG	Points per game	**Bold**	Career high

=== NBA ===
==== Regular season ====
Year	Team	GP	GS	MPG	FG%	FT%	RPG	APG	SPG	BPG	PPG
1974–75	Philadelphia	12	0	6.0	**.523**	.667	1.0	.3	.3	**.1**	4.0
1975–76	Philadelphia	**65**	**1**	12.6	.434	**.833**	**1.6**	1.0	.4	**.1**	5.9
1978–79	San Diego	22		**14.7**	.430	.826	1.5	**1.1**	**.5**	**.1**	**7.3**
Career		99	1	12.3	.439	.820	1.5	.9	.4	.1	6.0

==== Playoffs ====
Year	Team	GP	MPG	FG%	FT%	RPG	APG	SPG	BPG	PPG
1976	Philadelphia	1	1.0	1.000	–	1.0	.0	.0	.0	2.0
