= 1978–79 Chicago Bulls season =

NBA professional basketball team season

- Head coach: Larry Costello (fired); Scotty Robertson (interim)
- General manager: Rod Thorn
- Owner(s): Arthur Wirtz and Jonathan Kovler
- Arena: Chicago Stadium

Results
- Record: 31–51 (.378)
- Place: Division: 5th (Midwest); Conference: 11th (Western)
- Playoff finish: Did not qualify
- Stats at Basketball Reference

Local media
- Television: WGN-TV (Jack Fleming, Johnny “Red” Kerr)
- Radio: WIND (Jim Durham, Bill Berg)

The 1978–79 Chicago Bulls season was the Bulls' 13th season in the NBA.

== Draft picks ==
Round	Pick	Player	Position	Nationality	College
1	9	Reggie Theus	SG	United States	Nevada-Las Vegas
2	31	Marvin Johnson		United States	New Mexico
3	53	Randy Ayers		United States	Miami
5	97	Ron Anthony		United States	Jacksonville
6	119	John Shoemaker		United States	Miami
7	140	Jarvis Reynolds		United States	West Georgia State
8	159	Chubby Cox	SG	United States	San Francisco
9	176	Joe Ponsetto		United States	DePaul
10	191	Mark Tucker		United States	Oklahoma State

== Roster ==
1978–79 Chicago Bulls roster
Players

Pos.	No.	Player	Height	Weight	DOB	From
G	14	Tate Armstrong	6 ft 3 in (1.91 m)	175 lb (79 kg)	1955-10-05	Duke
F	50	John Brown	6 ft 7 in (2.01 m)	220 lb (100 kg)	1951-12-14	Missouri
G	5	Charles Dudley	6 ft 2 in (1.88 m)	180 lb (82 kg)	1950-03-05	Washington
C	53	Artis Gilmore	7 ft 2 in (2.18 m)	240 lb (109 kg)	1949-09-21	Jacksonville
G	12	Wilbur Holland	6 ft 0 in (1.83 m)	175 lb (79 kg)	1951-11-08	New Orleans
F	8	Mickey Johnson	6 ft 10 in (2.08 m)	190 lb (86 kg)	1952-08-31	Aurora
F	27	Ollie Johnson	6 ft 6 in (1.98 m)	200 lb (91 kg)	1949-05-11	Temple
F	54	Mark Landsberger	6 ft 8 in (2.03 m)	215 lb (98 kg)	1955-05-21	Arizona State
C	45	Scott Lloyd	6 ft 10 in (2.08 m)	230 lb (104 kg)	1952-12-19	Arizona State
F	17	Scott May	6 ft 7 in (2.01 m)	215 lb (98 kg)	1954-03-19	Indiana
G	15	John Mengelt	6 ft 2 in (1.88 m)	195 lb (88 kg)	1949-10-16	Auburn
F	10	Steve Sheppard	6 ft 6 in (1.98 m)	215 lb (98 kg)	1954-03-21	Maryland
G	24	Reggie Theus	6 ft 6 in (1.98 m)	190 lb (86 kg)	1957-10-13	UNLV
G	44	Andre Wakefield	6 ft 3 in (1.91 m)	175 lb (79 kg)	1955-01-11	Loyola Chicago

Coaches
Head coach
- Larry Costello (fired)
- Scotty Robertson (interim)
Assistant(s)
- Bumper Tormohlen

Legend
- (DP) Unsigned draft pick
- (FA) Free agent
- (S) Suspended
- Injured

Roster
Updated: February 16, 1979

== Regular season ==
=== Season standings ===
Midwest Division	W	L	PCT	GB	Home	Road	Div
y-Kansas City Kings	48	34	.585	–	32–9	16–25	12–4
x-Denver Nuggets	47	35	.573	1	29–12	18–23	8–8
Indiana Pacers	38	44	.463	10	25–16	13–28	6–10
Milwaukee Bucks	38	44	.463	10	28–13	10–31	9–7
Chicago Bulls	31	51	.378	17	19–22	12–29	5–11

#	Western Conference				
#	Team	W	L	PCT	GB
1	z-Seattle SuperSonics	52	30	.634	–
2	y-Kansas City Kings	48	34	.585	4
3	x-Phoenix Suns	50	32	.610	2
4	x-Denver Nuggets	47	35	.573	5
5	x-Los Angeles Lakers	47	35	.573	5
6	x-Portland Trail Blazers	45	37	.549	7
7	San Diego Clippers	43	39	.524	9
8	Indiana Pacers	38	44	.463	14
9	Milwaukee Bucks	38	44	.463	14
10	Golden State Warriors	38	44	.463	14
11	Chicago Bulls	31	51	.378	21

z - clinched division title
y - clinched division title
x - clinched playoff spot

=== Game log ===
1978–79 game log
Total: 31–51 (home: 19–22; road: 12–29)
October: 0–0 (home: 0–0; road: 0–0)

Game	Date	Team	Score	High points	High rebounds	High assists	Location Attendance	Record

November : 0–0 (home: 0–0; road: 0–0)

Game	Date	Team	Score	High points	High rebounds	High assists	Location Attendance	Record

December : 0–0 (home: 0–0; road: 0–0)

Game	Date	Team	Score	High points	High rebounds	High assists	Location Attendance	Record

January : 0–0 (home: 0–0; road: 0–0)

Game	Date	Team	Score	High points	High rebounds	High assists	Location Attendance	Record

February : 0–0 (home: 0–0; road: 0–0)

Game	Date	Team	Score	High points	High rebounds	High assists	Location Attendance	Record

March : 0–0 (home: 0–0; road: 0–0)

Game	Date	Team	Score	High points	High rebounds	High assists	Location Attendance	Record

April : 0–0 (home: 0–0; road: 0–0)

Game	Date	Team	Score	High points	High rebounds	High assists	Location Attendance	Record

1978–79 schedule

== Player statistics ==
Legend
GP	Games played	GS	Games started	MPG	Minutes per game
FG%	Field-goal percentage	3P%	3-point field-goal percentage	FT%	Free-throw percentage
RPG	Rebounds per game	APG	Assists per game	SPG	Steals per game
BPG	Blocks per game	PPG	Points per game

Player	GP	GS	MPG	FG%	3P%	FT%	RPG	APG	SPG	BPG	PPG

== Awards and records ==
- Reggie Theus, NBA All-Rookie Team 1st Team
- Artis Gilmore, NBA All-Star Game
