= 1978–79 Denver Nuggets season =

Nuggets' 3rd season in the NBA

- Head coach: Larry Brown; Donnie Walsh
- Arena: McNichols Sports Arena

Results
- Record: 47–35 (.573)
- Place: Division: 2nd (Midwest); Conference: 4th (Western)
- Playoff finish: West First Round (lost to Lakers 1–2)
- Stats at Basketball Reference

Local media
- Television: KWGN-TV
- Radio: KOA

The 1978–79 Denver Nuggets season was the Nuggets' 3rd season in the NBA and 12th season as a franchise.

In the playoffs, the Nuggets lost to the Los Angeles Lakers in three games in the First Round.

The Nuggets would not make the playoffs again until 1982.

== Draft picks ==
Round	Pick	Player	Position	Nationality	School/Club team
1	17	Rod Griffin	PF	United States	Wake Forest
1	21	Mike Evans	PG	United States	Kansas State
3	46	Hollis Copeland	SF	United States	Rutgers
5	106	Michael Edwards		United States	Texas-Pan American
6	127	Robert Heard		United States	Columbus State
7	148	Jack Gilloon		United States	South Carolina
8	166	Larry Vaculik		United States	Colorado
9	183	Tom Schneeburger		United States	Air Force
10	198	Phil Taylor		United States	Arizona

== Roster ==
Denver Nuggets roster
Players

Pos.	No.	Player	Height	Weight	DOB	From
F	41	Tom Boswell	6 ft 9 in (2.06 m)	220 lb (100 kg)		South Carolina
F	22	Geoff Crompton	6 ft 11 in (2.11 m)	280 lb (127 kg)		North Carolina
F	31	Bo Ellis	6 ft 9 in (2.06 m)	197 lb (89 kg)		Marquette
SF	55	Phil Hicks	6 ft 7 in (2.01 m)	205 lb (93 kg)		Tulane
C	35	Kim Hughes	6 ft 11 in (2.11 m)	220 lb (100 kg)		Wisconsin
C	44	Dan Issel	6 ft 9 in (2.06 m)	235 lb (107 kg)		Kentucky
F	10	John Kuester	6 ft 2 in (1.88 m)	180 lb (82 kg)		North Carolina
F	30	George McGinnis	6 ft 8 in (2.03 m)	230 lb (104 kg)		Indiana
F	21	Anthony Roberts	6 ft 5 in (1.96 m)	185 lb (84 kg)		Oral Roberts
G	5	Robert Smith	5 ft 11 in (1.80 m)	165 lb (75 kg)		UNLV
G	11	Charlie Scott	6 ft 5 in (1.96 m)	175 lb (79 kg)		North Carolina
SF	33	David Thompson	6 ft 4 in (1.93 m)	195 lb (88 kg)		NC State
G	32	Bob Wilkerson	6 ft 6 in (1.98 m)	195 lb (88 kg)		Indiana

Coaches
Head coach
- Larry Brown, Donnie Walsh

Legend
- (DP) Unsigned draft pick
- (FA) Free agent
- (S) Suspended
- Injured

== Regular season ==
=== Season standings ===
Midwest Division	W	L	PCT	GB	Home	Road	Div
y-Kansas City Kings	48	34	.585	–	32–9	16–25	12–4
x-Denver Nuggets	47	35	.573	1	29–12	18–23	8–8
Indiana Pacers	38	44	.463	10	25–16	13–28	6–10
Milwaukee Bucks	38	44	.463	10	28–13	10–31	9–7
Chicago Bulls	31	51	.378	17	19–22	12–29	5–11

#	Western Conference				
#	Team	W	L	PCT	GB
1	z-Seattle SuperSonics	52	30	.634	–
2	y-Kansas City Kings	48	34	.585	4
3	x-Phoenix Suns	50	32	.610	2
4	x-Denver Nuggets	47	35	.573	5
5	x-Los Angeles Lakers	47	35	.573	5
6	x-Portland Trail Blazers	45	37	.549	7
7	San Diego Clippers	43	39	.524	9
8	Indiana Pacers	38	44	.463	14
9	Milwaukee Bucks	38	44	.463	14
10	Golden State Warriors	38	44	.463	14
11	Chicago Bulls	31	51	.378	21

z - clinched division title
y - clinched division title
x - clinched playoff spot

== Game log ==
=== Regular season ===
1978–79 game log
Total: 47–35 (home: 29–12; road: 18–23)
October: 6–3 (home: 4–0; road: 2–3)

Game	Date	Team	Score	High points	High rebounds	High assists	Location Attendance	Record
5	October 21	@ Atlanta	L 125–130				The Omni	4–1

November: 4–10 (home: 2–3; road: 2–7)

Game	Date	Team	Score	High points	High rebounds	High assists	Location Attendance	Record
19	November 22	Atlanta	L 111–113				McNichols Sports Arena	9–10

December: 7–6 (home: 5–3; road: 2–3)

Game	Date	Team	Score	High points	High rebounds	High assists	Location Attendance	Record
36	December 30	@ Atlanta	L 87–113				The Omni	17–19

January: 11–6 (home: 7–2; road: 4–4)

Game	Date	Team	Score	High points	High rebounds	High assists	Location Attendance	Record

February: 7–6 (home: 5–2; road: 2–4)

Game	Date	Team	Score	High points	High rebounds	High assists	Location Attendance	Record
All-Star Break

March: 9–2 (home: 6–2; road: 3–0)

Game	Date	Team	Score	High points	High rebounds	High assists	Location Attendance	Record
72	March 17	Atlanta	W 118–111				McNichols Sports Arena	39–33

April: 3–2 (home: 0–0; road: 3–2)

Game	Date	Team	Score	High points	High rebounds	High assists	Location Attendance	Record

1978–79 schedule

=== Playoffs ===
1979 playoff game log
Western Conference First Round: 1–2 (home: 1–1; road: 0–1)

Game	Date	Team	Score	High points	High rebounds	High assists	Location Attendance	Series
1	April 10	Los Angeles	W 119–105	Dan Issel (30)	Dan Issel (10)	Bob Wilkerson (7)	McNichols Sports Arena; 16,011	1–0
2	April 13	@ Los Angeles	L 109–121	David Thompson (29)	Tom Boswell (12)	Tom Boswell (7)	The Forum; 14,182	1–1
3	April 16	Los Angeles	L 111–112	David Thompson (28)	Dan Issel (10)	David Thompson (7)	McNichols Sports Arena; 16,181	1–2

1979 schedule
