= Ron Brewer =

American basketball player (born 1955)

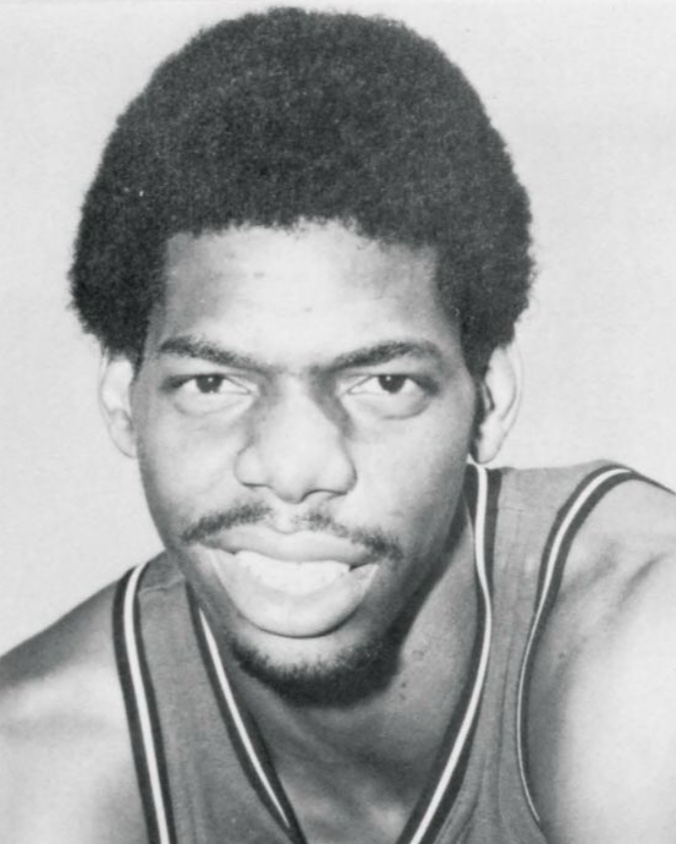
- Brewer during his junior year at Arkansas, c. 1976

Personal information
- Born: September 16, 1955 (age 71) Fort Smith, Arkansas, U.S.
- Listed height: 6 ft 4 in (1.93 m)
- Listed weight: 180 lb (82 kg)

Career information
- High school: Northside (Fort Smith, Arkansas)
- College: Arkansas–Fort Smith (1974–1975); Arkansas (1975–1978)
- NBA draft: 1978: 1st round, 7th overall pick
- Drafted by: Portland Trail Blazers
- Playing career: 1978–1986
- Position: Shooting guard
- Number: 10, 17, 22

Career history
- 1978–1981: Portland Trail Blazers
- 1981–1981: San Antonio Spurs
- 1981–1982: Cleveland Cavaliers
- 1982–1984: Golden State Warriors
- 1984: San Antonio Spurs
- 1985: New Jersey Nets
- 1985: Chicago Bulls
- 1986: Cleveland Cavaliers

Career highlights
- NBA All-Rookie First Team (1979); Consensus second-team All-American (1978); SWC Player of the Year (1978)

Career statistics
- Points: 5,971 (11.9 ppg)
- Rebounds: 971 (1.9 rpg)
- Assists: 920 (1.8 apg)
- Stats at NBA.com
- Stats at Basketball Reference

Ronald Charles Brewer (born September 16, 1955) is an American former professional basketball player. A 6-foot-4-inch (1.93 m) guard from the University of Arkansas, he was selected by the Portland Trail Blazers in the first round of the 1978 NBA draft.

== Prep years ==
Brewer played basketball at Fort Smith Northside High School, leading the Grizzlies to the 1974 Overall Championship and a 30–0 record.

== Collegiate career ==
Following high school, Brewer attended Westark Community College (now the University of Arkansas at Fort Smith). Brewer then signed to play for coach Eddie Sutton at the University of Arkansas. One of the famed "Triplets" along with Sidney Moncrief and Marvin Delph, Brewer was named All-American in 1978. He averaged 18.0 points per game while helping the Arkansas Razorbacks reach the Final Four in the 1978 NCAA Men's Division I Basketball Tournament, and was also named to the All-Tournament Team.

== NBA career ==
Ron Brewer was selected by the Trail Blazers with 7th pick in the 1978 NBA draft, and was named to the 1978–79 NBA All-Rookie Team, Brewer was drafted directly after Larry Bird and ahead of notable NBA players such as Reggie Theus and Maurice Cheeks. On October 14, 1979, Brewer became the first Trail Blazer to hit a three-point shot in a regular season game.

Brewer went on to spend eight seasons in the league with six teams—the Trail Blazers, San Antonio Spurs, Cleveland Cavaliers, Golden State Warriors, New Jersey Nets, and Chicago Bulls—and finished his career in 1986 with 5,971 total points (11.9 ppg).

== Personal life ==
His son, Ronnie Brewer, also played college basketball at the University of Arkansas, and was selected by the Utah Jazz in the first round of the 2006 NBA draft. They became the first father-son combination in Chicago Bulls history when Ronnie joined that team in 2010. He is currently the head coach at City University in Memphis, Tennessee.

== Career statistics ==
Legend
GP	Games played	GS	Games started	MPG	Minutes per game
FG%	Field goal percentage	3P%	3-point field goal percentage	FT%	Free throw percentage
RPG	Rebounds per game	APG	Assists per game	SPG	Steals per game
BPG	Blocks per game	PPG	Points per game	**Bold**	Career high

=== NBA ===
==== Regular season ====
Year	Team	GP	GS	MPG	FG%	3P%	FT%	RPG	APG	SPG	BPG	PPG
1978–79	Portland	81		30.3	.494		.820	**2.8**	2.0	**1.3**	**1.0**	13.3
1979–80	Portland	**82**	82	34.3	.464	.188	.840	2.6	2.6	1.2	.6	15.7
1980–81	Portland	29		18.9	.386	.333	.765	1.1	1.9	1.2	.3	7.5
1980–81	San Antonio	46		19.7	.468	.000	.813	1.2	2.0	.6	.5	9.2
1981–82	San Antonio	25	4	23.8	.504	.300	.875	2.0	**2.7**	.9	.3	17.8
1981–82	Cleveland	47	**41**	**36.7**	.465	.238	.779	2.4	2.6	**1.3**	.5	**19.4**
1982–83	Cleveland	21	18	26.8	.400	.000	.863	1.8	1.3	1.0	.3	11.4
1982–83	Golden State	53	34	26.4	.438	**.467**	.824	2.0	1.3	**1.3**	.4	11.3
1983–84	Golden State	13	3	16.2	.466	.000	.647	1.0	.5	.5	.4	5.0
1983–84	San Antonio	40	5	19.6	.441	.231	.820	1.3	1.1	.5	.4	8.7
1984–85	San Antonio	9	0	9.0	.382	–	**1.000**	.3	.7	.1	.1	3.7
1984–85	New Jersey	11	0	22.3	**.583**	.000	.889	1.6	1.0	.5	.5	10.4
1985–86	Chicago	4	0	4.5	.333	–	**1.000**	.0	.0	.0	.0	1.8
1985–86	Cleveland	40	3	13.8	.386	.294	.892	1.3	1.0	.4	.2	5.1
Career		501	190	25.7	.459	.248	.824	1.9	1.8	1.0	.5	11.9

==== Playoffs ====
Year	Team	GP	GS	MPG	FG%	3P%	FT%	RPG	APG	SPG	BPG	PPG
1979	Portland	3		31.3	**.564**		.692	**3.7**	**2.7**	.3	**3.0**	17.7
1980	Portland	3		**35.3**	.426	.000	.556	1.0	2.0	**1.0**	.3	**19.0**
1981	San Antonio	**7**		16.9	.475	**.333**	.724	.7	1.9	.1	.9	11.4
1985	New Jersey	3	0	31.0	.500	.000	**.750**	1.7	1.7	**1.0**	.0	12.0
Career		16	0	25.7	.482	.143	.695	1.5	2.0	.5	1.0	14.1
