= Tom Abernethy =

American basketball player (born 1954)

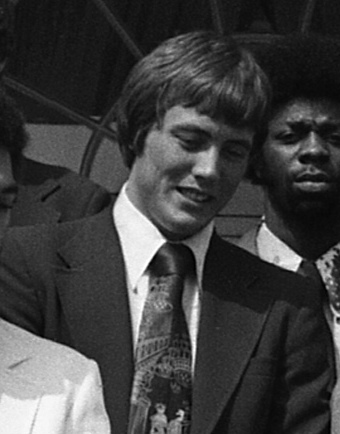
- Abernethy in 1976

Personal information
- Born: May 6, 1954 (age 72) South Bend, Indiana, U.S.
- Listed height: 6 ft 7 in (2.01 m)
- Listed weight: 220 lb (100 kg)

Career information
- High school: St. Joseph's (South Bend, Indiana)
- College: Indiana (1972–1976)
- NBA draft: 1976: 3rd round, 43rd overall pick
- Drafted by: Los Angeles Lakers
- Playing career: 1976–1983
- Position: Small forward
- Number: 5

Career history
- 1976–1978: Los Angeles Lakers
- 1978–1980: Golden State Warriors
- 1980–1981: Indiana Pacers
- 1981–1983: Basket Brescia Leonessa

Career highlights
- NCAA champion (1976)

Career NBA statistics
- Points: 1,779 (5.6 ppg)
- Rebounds: 1,011 (3.2 rpg)
- Assists: 384 (1.2 apg)
- Stats at NBA.com
- Stats at Basketball Reference

Thomas Craig Abernethy (born May 6, 1954) is an American former professional basketball player. He played college basketball for the Indiana Hoosiers and won a national championship in 1976. Abernethy was selected by the Los Angeles Lakers in the 1976 NBA draft and played five seasons in the National Basketball Association (NBA) for the Lakers, Golden State Warriors and Indiana Pacers. He finished his career after playing in Italy for two seasons with Basket Brescia Leonessa.

In 1996 Abernethy founded the Indiana Basketball Academy where thousands of young men learn basketball skills, and the importance of character development.

== High school career ==
Abernethy attended St. Joseph's High School in his hometown of South Bend, Indiana. He averaged 25.9 points per game as a senior and set the South Bend city scoring record with his 648 points. Abernethy led his team to 22 wins and a victory in the South Bend sectional championship.

The Indiana Hoosiers began recruiting Abernethy during his high school career. Head coach Bob Knight visited the Abernethy family at their house where he was grilled by Abernethy's mother about the recruitment of another player. Abernethy had wanted to attend Indiana University Bloomington even if he had not played basketball and ultimately committed to play for Knight with the Hoosiers.

== College career ==
Abernethy joined the Hoosiers in 1972 and saw limited playing time during his first three seasons due to being on a stacked team. He became a focal point of the Hoosiers as a senior during the 1975–76 season where he was moved to the starting line-up and averaged 10 points and 5.3 rebounds per game. The Hoosiers won the 1976 NCAA Division I Basketball Tournament after compiling a 32–0 record; they remain the last team in college basketball to have an undefeated record.

== Professional career ==
Abernethy was selected by the Los Angeles Lakers as the 43rd overall pick in the 1976 NBA draft. He played his first two seasons with the Lakers before he was traded to the Buffalo Braves in June 1978 for a second-round pick. The following month, Golden State Warriors signed Abernethy from the Braves (now the San Diego Clippers) in return for another second-round pick.

Abernethy played two seasons with the Warriors. He made a cameo appearance in the 1980 film Inside Moves where a Warriors game is depicted. In December 1980, Abernethy was waived by the Warriors and signed by the Indiana Pacers for the rest of the season.

Abernethy finished his career in Italy with Basket Brescia Leonessa.

Abernethy was inducted into the Indiana Basketball Hall of Fame in 2012.

== NBA career statistics ==
Legend
GP	Games played	GS	Games started	MPG	Minutes per game
FG%	Field goal percentage	3P%	3-point field goal percentage	FT%	Free throw percentage
RPG	Rebounds per game	APG	Assists per game	SPG	Steals per game
BPG	Blocks per game	PPG	Points per game	**Bold**	Career high

=== Regular season ===
Year	Team	GP	GS	MPG	FG%	3P%	FT%	RPG	APG	SPG	BPG	PPG
1976–77	L.A. Lakers	70	–	**19.7**	.484	–	.754	**4.2**	**1.4**	.7	.1	6.3
1977–78	L.A. Lakers	**73**	–	18.0	.498	–	**.820**	3.6	**1.4**	**.8**	**.3**	**6.8**
1978–79	Golden State	70	–	17.4	**.515**	.000	.745	3.1	1.1	.6	.2	6.0
1979–80	Golden State	67	–	18.2	.481	.000	.683	2.9	1.3	.5	.2	5.4
1980–81	Golden State	10	–	3.9	.333	.000	.667	.8	.1	.1	.0	.4
1980–81	Indiana	29	–	8.9	.429	.000	.579	1.4	.6	.2	.1	2.0
Career		319	–	17.0	.492	.000	.747	3.2	1.2	.6	.2	5.6

=== Playoffs ===
Year	Team	GP	GS	MPG	FG%	3P%	FT%	RPG	APG	SPG	BPG	PPG
1977	L.A. Lakers	**11**	–	**19.5**	**.420**	–	.815	**3.6**	**2.0**	**.6**	**.2**	**5.8**
1978	L.A. Lakers	2	–	6.0	.250	–	**1.000**	1.0	.5	.0	.0	2.0
Career		13	4	17.4	.407	.000	.828	3.2	1.8	.5	.2	5.2

== Post-playing career ==
After his playing retirement, Abernethy worked in commercial real estate until the 1990s. He served as a technical advisor on the 1986 film Hoosiers.

Abernethy created the Indiana Basketball Academy in 1995 which provides skills training for young players. It has been attended by over 25,000 children since its inception.

== Personal life ==
Abernethy has three sons who all played college basketball. His twin sons, Andy and Matt, played for Bethel College and Grace College respectively. His youngest son, Todd, played for the Ole Miss Rebels served as an assistant coach for the Florida Atlantic Owls men's basketball and presently serves as an assistant coach for the Georgia Bulldogs men's basketball.
