= Andre Wakefield =

American basketball player and coach

Personal information
- Born: January 11, 1955 (age 71) Chicago, Illinois, U.S.
- Listed height: 6 ft 3 in (1.91 m)
- Listed weight: 175 lb (79 kg)

Career information
- High school: Crane (Chicago, Illinois)
- College: College of Southern Idaho (1974–1976); Loyola Chicago (1976–1978)
- NBA draft: 1978: 5th round, 107th overall pick
- Drafted by: Phoenix Suns
- Playing career: 1978–1981
- Position: Point guard
- Number: 44, 26, 15

Career history
- 1978: Chicago Bulls
- 1978–1979: Detroit Pistons
- 1979: Utah Jazz
- 1980: Anchorage Northern Knights
- 1980–1981: Billings Volcanos
- Stats at NBA.com
- Stats at Basketball Reference

Andre Wakefield (born January 1, 1955) is an American former professional basketball player. He was a 6 ft 2 1/2 in (189 cm) 175 pounds (79 kg) point guard. Born in Chicago, Illinois, he played high school basketball at Crane High School and collegiately at the College of Southern Idaho and Loyola University Chicago. He played briefly in the NBA from 1978 to 1980.

== NBA ==
Wakefield was selected with the 19th pick in the 5th round of the 1978 NBA draft by the Phoenix Suns. In two seasons with Detroit Pistons, Chicago Bulls and Utah Jazz, he averaged 2.3 points, 1.0 rebounds and 0.9 assists per game. After his playing days, he became an assistant coach at Loyola.

== Career statistics ==
Legend
GP	Games played	GS	Games started	MPG	Minutes per game
FG%	Field goal percentage	3P%	3-point field goal percentage	FT%	Free throw percentage
RPG	Rebounds per game	APG	Assists per game	SPG	Steals per game
BPG	Blocks per game	PPG	Points per game	**Bold**	Career high

=== NBA ===
==== Regular season ====
Year	Team	GP	MPG	FG%	3P%	FT%	RPG	APG	SPG	BPG	PPG
1978–79	Chicago	2	4.0	.000		–	.0	.5	.0	.0	.0
1978–79	Detroit	**71**	**8.1**	.352		.696	**1.1**	**1.0**	**.3**	.0	**2.4**
1979–80	Utah	8	5.9	**.400**	–	**1.000**	.5	.4	.1	.0	1.9
Career		81	7.8	.354	–	.708	1.0	.9	.2	.0	2.3
