= 1975–76 Los Angeles Lakers season =

NBA professional basketball team season

- Head coach: Bill Sharman
- General manager: Pete Newell
- Owner: Jack Kent Cooke
- Arena: The Forum

Results
- Record: 40–42 (.488)
- Place: Division: 4th (Pacific); Conference: 6th (Western)
- Playoff finish: Did not qualify
- Stats at Basketball Reference

Local media
- Television: KTLA
- Radio: KABC

The 1975–76 Los Angeles Lakers season was the Lakers' 28th season in the NBA and 16th season in Los Angeles.

On June 16, 1975, the Lakers had traded Elmore Smith, Brian Winters, David Meyers, and Junior Bridgeman to the Milwaukee Bucks, in exchange for Kareem Abdul-Jabbar. The Lakers raced to a 21–13 start before slumping back to .500 and failing to make the playoffs. Despite the Lakers' losing regular-season record (40–42), Abdul-Jabbar won MVP honors in a narrow vote over Bob McAdoo of the Buffalo Braves and Dave Cowens of the Boston Celtics.

== Roster ==
1975–76 Los Angeles Lakers roster
Players

Pos.	No.	Player	Height	Weight	DOB	From
C	33	Kareem Abdul-Jabbar	7 ft 2 in (2.18 m)	225 lb (102 kg)	1947-04-16	UCLA
PG	42	Lucius Allen	6 ft 2 in (1.88 m)	175 lb (79 kg)	1947-09-26	UCLA
SF	10	Corky Calhoun	6 ft 7 in (2.01 m)	210 lb (95 kg)	1950-11-01	Penn
SF	35	Don Ford	6 ft 9 in (2.06 m)	215 lb (98 kg)	1952-12-31	UC Santa Barbara
SG	20	Donnie Freeman	6 ft 3 in (1.91 m)	185 lb (84 kg)	1944-07-18	Illinois
SG	25	Gail Goodrich	6 ft 1 in (1.85 m)	170 lb (77 kg)	1943-04-23	UCLA
SF	41	C. J. Kupec	6 ft 6 in (1.98 m)	220 lb (100 kg)	1953-01-26	Michigan
PG	23	Stu Lantz	6 ft 3 in (1.91 m)	175 lb (79 kg)	1946-07-13	Nebraska
C	11	Jim McDaniels	6 ft 11 in (2.11 m)	228 lb (103 kg)	1948-04-02	Western Kentucky
PF	21	Cliff Meely	6 ft 8 in (2.03 m)	215 lb (98 kg)	1947-07-10	Colorado
SG	12	Pat Riley	6 ft 4 in (1.93 m)	205 lb (93 kg)	1945-03-20	Kentucky
SG	15	John Roche	6 ft 3 in (1.91 m)	170 lb (77 kg)	1949-09-26	South Carolina
SF	32	Cazzie Russell	6 ft 5 in (1.96 m)	218 lb (99 kg)	1944-06-07	Michigan
PF	30	Cornell Warner	6 ft 9 in (2.06 m)	220 lb (100 kg)	1948-08-12	Jackson State
PF	24	Kermit Washington	6 ft 8 in (2.03 m)	230 lb (104 kg)	1951-09-17	American
C	21	Walt Wesley	6 ft 11 in (2.11 m)	220 lb (100 kg)	1945-01-25	Kansas
PG	15	Ron Williams	6 ft 3 in (1.91 m)	188 lb (85 kg)	1944-09-24	West Virginia

Coaches
Head coach
- Bill Sharman
Assistant(s)
- Larry Creger

Legend
- (DP) Unsigned draft pick
- (FA) Free agent
- (S) Suspended
- Injured

Roster
Updated: February 9, 1976

== Regular season ==
=== Season standings ===
Pacific Division	W	L	PCT	GB	Home	Road	Div
y-Golden State Warriors	59	23	.720	–	36–5	23–18	17–9
x-Seattle SuperSonics	43	39	.524	16	31–10	12–29	12–14
x-Phoenix Suns	42	40	.512	17	27–14	15–26	15–11
Los Angeles Lakers	40	42	.488	19	31–11	9–31	10–16
Portland Trail Blazers	37	45	.451	22	25–15	12–30	11–15

#	Western Conference				
#	Team	W	L	PCT	GB
1	z-Golden State Warriors	59	23	.720	–
2	x-Seattle SuperSonics	43	39	.524	16
3	x-Phoenix Suns	42	40	.512	17
4	y-Milwaukee Bucks	38	44	.463	21
5	x-Detroit Pistons	36	46	.439	23
6	Los Angeles Lakers	40	42	.488	19
7	Portland Trail Blazers	37	45	.451	22
8	Kansas City Kings	31	51	.378	28
9	Chicago Bulls	24	58	.293	35

z – clinched division title
y – clinched division title
x – clinched playoff spot

== Awards and records ==
- Kareem Abdul-Jabbar, NBA Most Valuable Player Award
- Kareem Abdul-Jabbar, All-NBA First Team
- Kareem Abdul-Jabbar, NBA All-Defensive Second Team
- Kareem Abdul-Jabbar, NBA All-Star Game
