= Elmore Smith =

American basketball player (born 1949)

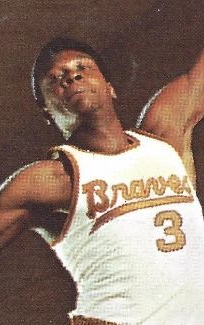
- Smith in 1971

Personal information
- Born: May 9, 1949 (age 77) Macon, Georgia, U.S.
- Listed height: 7 ft 1 in (2.16 m)
- Listed weight: 250 lb (113 kg)

Career information
- High school: Ballard-Hudson (Macon, Georgia)
- College: Kentucky State (1968–1971)
- NBA draft: 1971: 1st round, 3rd overall pick
- Drafted by: Buffalo Braves
- Playing career: 1971–1979
- Position: Center
- Number: 3

Career history
- 1971–1973: Buffalo Braves
- 1973–1975: Los Angeles Lakers
- 1975–1977: Milwaukee Bucks
- 1977–1979: Cleveland Cavaliers

Career highlights
- NBA All-Rookie First Team (1972); NBA blocks leader (1974)

Career NBA statistics
- Points: 7,541 (13.4 ppg)
- Rebounds: 5,962 (10.6 rpg)
- Blocks: 1,183 (2.9 bpg)
- Stats at NBA.com
- Stats at Basketball Reference

Elmore Smith (born May 9, 1949) is an American former professional basketball player born in Macon, Georgia. A 7 ft 1 in (2.16 m) center from Kentucky State University, he played in the National Basketball Association (NBA) from 1971 to 1979. He was a member of the Buffalo Braves, Los Angeles Lakers, Milwaukee Bucks, and Cleveland Cavaliers.

== Early life ==
Smith was born on May 9, 1949, in Macon, Georgia, and was a graduate of Ballard-Hudson High School in Macon.

As a 5 ft 11 in (1.80 m) high school freshman, he did not make the team as he had no basketball skills. (It has also been reported that he did not try out for the team until two years later.) After sprouting to 7 feet (2.13 m) over the next two years, Smith said, "The principal threatened me: 'If you don't go out for basketball, we're going to kick you off campus.'" During high school, Smith attempted to enlist in the military three different times, but was rejected because of his height.

Smith made the team but rarely played, as he still had no basketball background and did not know how to dribble or shoot. Smith had only three college basketball scholarship offers "just by being tall and coordinated," he said. Smith was offered scholarships to Fort Valley State University, Wiley College and Kentucky State University, and intended go to Wiley College. However, Kentucky State coach Lucias Mitchell called Smith's mother, and he ultimately decided to attend Kentucky State. It has also been stated that he originally enrolled at Wiley College, but he was told by the school's basketball coach his playing time would be limited. So, he transferred to Kentucky State.

== College career ==
Smith is said in one report to have attended junior college for a year, and then transferred to Kentucky State University. He rapidly progressed as a player at Kentucky State once he started learning the game during basketball drills and focused skills training from his coaches.

He was a member of the 1970 and 1971 Kentucky State NAIA championship teams, coached by Lucias Mitchell, playing alongside teammate Travis Grant. Smith was a second-team Division II All-American as a sophomore (1969–70). Both Smith and Grant were selected as first-team Division II (Little) All-Americans in 1970–71. Smith was named to the NAIA All-Tournament Team in both 1970 and 1971

He is listed among the top rebounders in Division II men's college basketball history, with 1,917 total rebounds and a 22.6 rebound per game career average. No Division II player has had a higher career per game rebounding average since Smith left Kentucky State after 1971. He holds the NAIA/Division II college record for most rebounds in a season (799 rebounds in 1971), which is also higher than Walter Dukes's Division I record for rebounds in a season (734), and Joe Manley's Division III record for rebounds in a season (579). Teammate Grant is the all-time Division II leader in points scored (4,045) and points per game (33.4).

In his freshman year (1968–69), Smith averaged 14.8 points and 19.8 rebounds per game. In 1969–1970, he averaged 21.6 points and 22.7 rebounds. In 1970–1971, he averaged 25.5 points and 24.2 rebounds. After compiling career averages of 21.3 points and 22.6 rebounds, Smith left for the NBA in 1971, before his senior year.

Smith and Grant were both named to the NAIA's 75th Anniversary team. He was inducted into the Small College Basketball Hall of Fame in 2017.

Smith was invited to try out for the 1972 U.S. men's Olympic basketball team, but declined because he needed to work and make money at the time.

== NBA career ==
=== Buffalo Braves ===
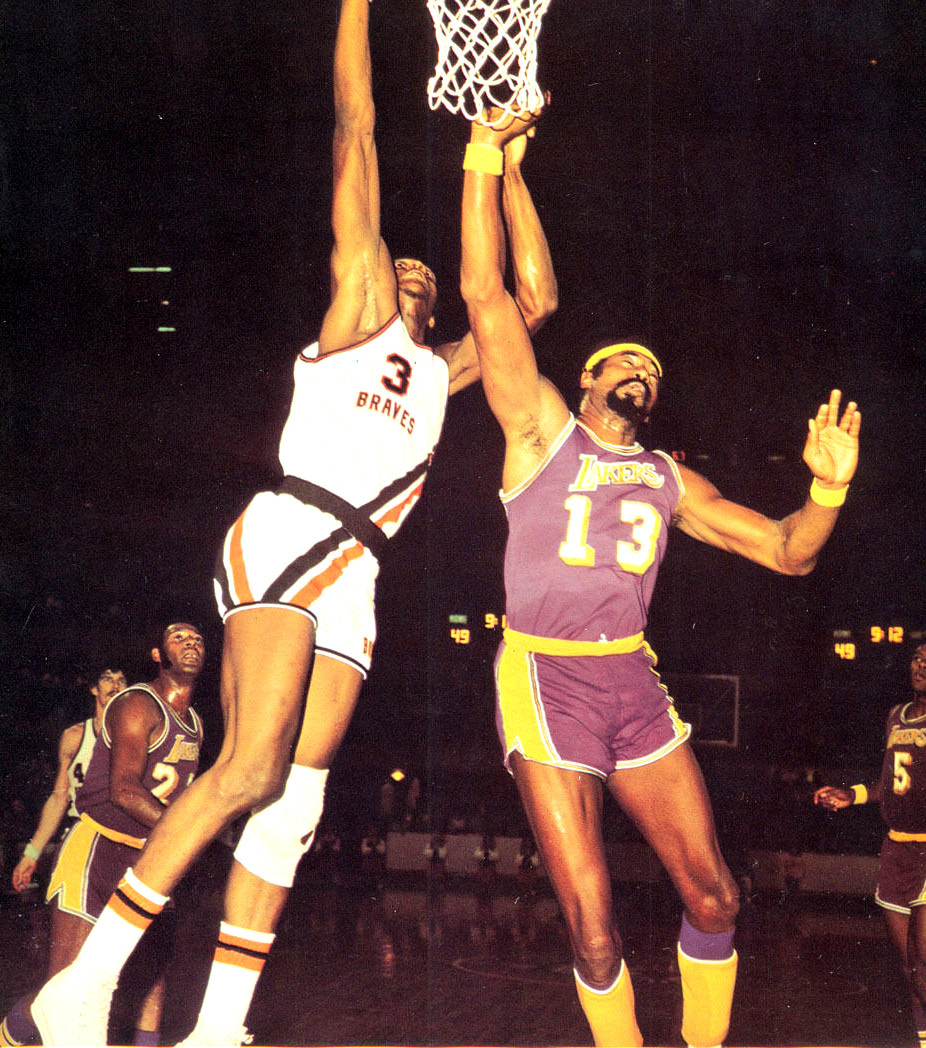
Smith (left) and Wilt Chamberlain battle for a rebound, circa 1971.

Smith was drafted by the Buffalo Braves (now the Los Angeles Clippers) in the first round (3rd pick overall) of the 1971 NBA Draft on March 29, 1971. He also was drafted in the first round of the 1971 American Basketball Association (ABA) draft (2nd pick overall) by the Carolina Cougars. Smith signed with the Braves. Smith reportedly declined a $2.2 million offer from the Cougars, instead accepting a multi-year contract from the Braves, to be paid out over 20 years. He signed with the Braves because he believed the NBA was a better league.

Even before the start of his rookie season (1971–72), Smith experienced physical problems with his left knee, causing him to miss pre-season games. He had knee surgery after the 1971–72 season to remove a cyst that had bothered him during the season. Problems with his knees would grow progressively worse during his abbreviated, eight-year career, and he would have his knees replaced in 2008, before reaching the age of 60.

In his first season, playing center, Smith averaged 17.3 points per game and 15.2 rebounds per game. He was second in NBA Rookie of the Year voting to Sidney Wicks. Smith played alongside All-Star forward Bob Kauffman, and was named to the NBA All-Rookie Team. He was sixth in the NBA in rebounds per game average, behind Naismith Hall of Fame centers Wilt Chamberlain, Wes Unseld, Kareem Abdul-Jabbar, Nate Thurmond and Dave Cowens, and ahead of Hall of Famers Elvin Hayes, Bob Lanier and Jerry Lucas. His rebounding average for that season is the eighth-highest ever recorded by an NBA rookie.

Smith got off to a slow start to the 1972–73 season because of the knee surgery to remove a cyst. Still, in 1972–1973, he averaged 18.3 points and 12.4 rebounds (11th best in the NBA) for the Braves, finishing 13th in NBA most valuable player voting. Then, on September 12, 1973, he was traded by the Braves to the Los Angeles Lakers for Jim McMillian.

During his two years on the Braves, the team was 22–60 and 21–61. Smith averaged nearly 41 minutes per game in 78 games as a rookie, and 37 minutes per game in 76 games the following season for the Braves.

=== Los Angeles Lakers ===
McMillen had averaged nearly 19 points per game on a Lakers team that lost in the 1973 NBA finals to the New York Knicks; and that included Hall of Famers Chamberlain, Jerry West and Gail Goodrich. In trading for Smith, the Lakers were preparing for the possibility that Wilt Chamberlain would retire, and in fact Chamberlain's 1972–73 season was his last in the NBA. Chamberlain was displeased the Lakers had traded for Smith without telling him beforehand. Before the start of the 1973–74 season, Chamberlain signed a three-year contract with the ABA's San Diego Conquistadors as a player-coach (though he never played for them). Smith became the starting center, averaging over 36 minutes per game in 81 games played during the 1973–74 season. One of his new Lakers' teammates was Travis Grant.

With the Lakers in 1973–74, Smith averaged 12.5 points with 11.2 rebounds (12th in the NBA) and a league leading 4.9 blocked shots per game. Kareem Abdul-Jabbar was number two at 3.5 blocks per game. He also led the league in total blocked shots (393). The 1973–1974 season was the first in which blocked shots were officially recorded by the NBA, after the ABA made it an official statistic a year earlier. Smith set a still-standing league record of 17 blocks in a game against Portland on October 28, 1973.

On the other hand, Smith, who missed more than half of his free throw attempts during the regular season, had an unusual performance in a 106 to 89 loss to the Atlanta Hawks on December 28, 1974, when he failed in three consecutive shots from the free throw line (under the now defunct "three to make two" rule in the NBA at the time) with all three attempts being an "air ball" where the ball basketball failed to hit the basket, the rim or the backboard.

In 1974-75 Smith averaged 10.9 points and 10.9 rebounds with 2.9 blocks for the Lakers. He was the team's starting center, but played less than 32 minutes per game. Still, he led the league in total blocked shots (216) and was second in blocking average to Abdul-Jabbar's 3.3 blocks per game. Without Chamberlain and West, however, the team fell to 30–52 and did not make the playoffs.

=== Milwaukee Bucks and Cleveland Cavaliers ===
On June 16, 1975, Smith was part of an historic trade involving Kareem Abdul-Jabbar. Abdul-Jabbar had demanded the Bucks trade him. Smith was traded by the Los Angeles Lakers with Junior Bridgeman, Dave Meyers and Brian Winters to the Milwaukee Bucks for Kareem Abdul-Jabbar and Walt Wesley. In the 1975–76 season, Smith averaged 15.6 points, 11.6 rebounds and 3.1 blocks per game. He was eighth in the NBA in rebounding average and second in total blocks and average blocks per game behind Abdul-Jabbar.

The following seasons, the Bucks acquired Swen Nater (who had left the ABA), and planned to have him share time with Smith. In 34 games with the Bucks that season (1976–77) Smith averaged 23.2 minutes per game and Nater 27.2 minutes per game. Smith also averaged 8.4 points, 6.1 rebounds and 2.0 blocks per game.

Smith was traded on January 13, 1977, with Gary Brokaw to the Cleveland Cavaliers for Rowland Garrett, a 1977 1st round draft pick (Ernie Grunfeld was later selected) and a 1978 1st round draft pick (George Johnson was later selected). At the time of the trade, the Cavaliers were leading the NBA's central division. Future Hall of fame Bucks' teammate Bob Dandridge said the trade was the second worst in Bucks' history (behind the Abdul-Jabbar trade). In 1976–77, as backup center to Jim Chones, Smith averaged 18.8 minutes, 8.7 points, 6.4 rebounds and 2.1 blocks per game for the 43–39 Cavaliers under Coach Bill Fitch. The Cavaliers lost in the first round of the playoffs.

The following season, still playing behind Chones, he averaged 24.6 minutes, 12.5 points, 8.7 rebounds and 2.2 blocks per game. Although averaging only 21 minutes per game in 1976–77, he was still tenth in the league in total blocks and blocked shot average; and was 6th in total blocks and 8th in blocked shot average in 1977-78, in less than 25 minutes per game.

The 29-year old Smith was plagued by a knee injury that required surgery, and played in only 24 games for Cleveland in 1978–79, the last games of his career. He had exploratory surgery in November 1978, and full knee surgery in October 1979, and it was anticipated he would miss the entire season. Smith considered his playing time in Cleveland his best experience in the NBA, and in 2014 he was inducted into the Cleveland Sports Hall of Fame.

== Legacy ==
Smith is best remembered for his shot-blocking, earning him the nickname "Elmore the Rejector". His 2.9 blocks per game career average is 5th best in NBA/ABA history. He led the league in total blocked shots twice (in 1974 and 1975), and holds the NBA record for most blocked shots in a game since 1973, with 17. He achieved this mark against the Portland Trail Blazers on October 28, 1973, while playing for the Lakers. Smith's average of 4.85 blocks per game from the 1973–74 season (the first season blocked shots were officially recorded in the NBA) is the third highest ever. He was also a skilled rebounder, and he averaged a double-double (13.4 points, 10.6 rebounds) over the course of his career.

== NBA career statistics ==
Legend
GP	Games played	GS	Games started	MPG	Minutes per game
FG%	Field goal percentage	3P%	3-point field goal percentage	FT%	Free throw percentage
RPG	Rebounds per game	APG	Assists per game	SPG	Steals per game
BPG	Blocks per game	PPG	Points per game	**Bold**	Career high
*	Led the league

=== Regular season ===
Year	Team	GP	GS	MPG	FG%	3P%	FT%	RPG	APG	SPG	BPG	PPG
1971–72	Buffalo	78	—	**40.8**	.454	—	.534	**15.2**	1.4	—	—	17.3
1972–73	Buffalo	76	—	37.2	.482	—	.558	12.4	**2.5**	—	—	**18.3**
1973–74	Los Angeles	**81**	—	36.1	.457	—	.590	11.2	1.9	.9	**4.9***	12.5
1974–75	Los Angeles	74	—	31.6	.493	—	.485	10.9	2.0	**1.1**	2.9	10.9
1975–76	Milwaukee	78	—	36.0	.518	—	.632	11.4	1.2	1.0	3.1	15.6
1976–77	Milwaukee	34	—	23.2	.447	—	.581	6.1	.9	.6	2.0	8.4
1976–77	Cleveland	36	—	18.8	.504	—	.519	6.4	.4	.4	2.1	8.7
1977–78	Cleveland	**81**	—	24.6	.497	—	.663	8.4	.7	.6	2.2	12.5
1978–79	Cleveland	24	—	13.8	**.531**	—	**.692**	4.4	.5	.3	.7	6.5
Career		562	—	31.8	.482	—	.579	10.6	1.4	.8	2.9	13.4

=== Playoffs ===
Year	Team	GP	GS	MPG	FG%	3P%	FT%	RPG	APG	SPG	BPG	PPG
1973–74	Los Angeles	**5**	—	34.2	.477	—	**.706**	**10.6**	**1.2**	1.4	1.6	**19.2**
1975–76	Milwaukee	3	—	**34.7**	**.556**	—	.667	7.3	.3	.7	**3.7**	14.7
1976–77	Cleveland	3	—	18.7	.545	—	.625	8.0	.3	**1.7**	1.0	13.7
1977–78	Cleveland	2	—	28.0	.458	—	.500	9.5	.0	1.5	1.5	12.5
Career		13	—	29.8	.500	—	.654	9.1	.6	1.3	1.9	15.8

== Personal life ==
Smith is the father of three daughters.

Smith started a barbecue sauce business in 2006 after years of making sauces for family and friends. His sauces are served at Elmore Smith's Smokehouse Restaurant located in Cleveland's Rocket Mortgage FieldHouse or online.

Smith has remained in the Cleveland area and is frequently seen at Cavalier games.

== Honors ==
- Smith was inducted into the Kentucky State Athletics Hall of Fame (2002).
- Smith was inducted into the Georgia Hall of Fame (2008).
- Smith was inducted into the Greater Cleveland Sports Hall of Fame (2014).
- Smith was inducted into the Small College Basketball Hall of Fame (2017).
- Smith was named to both the NAIA’s 50th and 75th Anniversary (2012) teams.

== See also ==
- List of NBA annual blocks leaders
- List of NBA single-season blocks per game leaders
