= Eric Money =

American basketball player (born 1955)

Personal information
- Born: February 6, 1955 (age 71) Detroit, Michigan, U.S.
- Listed height: 6 ft 0 in (1.83 m)
- Listed weight: 170 lb (77 kg)

Career information
- High school: Kettering (Detroit, Michigan)
- College: Arizona (1972–1974)
- NBA draft: 1974: 2nd round, 33rd overall pick
- Drafted by: Detroit Pistons
- Playing career: 1974–1980
- Position: Point guard
- Number: 14, 22

Career history
- 1974–1978: Detroit Pistons
- 1978–1979: New Jersey Nets
- 1979: Philadelphia 76ers
- 1979–1980: Detroit Pistons

Career NBA statistics
- Points: 5,211 (12.2 ppg)
- Rebounds: 894 (2.1 rpg)
- Assists: 1,623 (3.8 apg)
- Stats at NBA.com
- Stats at Basketball Reference

Eric Money (born February 6, 1955) is an American former professional basketball player who played six seasons in the National Basketball Association (NBA). He played college basketball for the Arizona Wildcats.

== Amateur career ==
A 6'0" point guard out of Kettering High School in Detroit, Michigan, Money played alongside fellow future NBA players Lindsay Hairston and Coniel Norman in helping Kettering win the 1971 Detroit Public School League title. After graduating high school in 1972, Money played collegiately at Arizona. Money was a member of the first class eligible to play as a freshman, averaging 19.9 ppg, but would declare for a draft hardship eligibility and would leave the Wildcats after averaging 18.1 ppg in his sophomore season.

== Professional career ==
Money was drafted by the hometown Detroit Pistons in the second round (33rd overall pick) of the 1974 NBA draft and started playing in the NBA at 19 years old. He was forced into a starting role in the 1975–76 Detroit Pistons season when an injury to starter Kevin Porter after 19 games provided Money with an opportunity for extensive playing time. He responded with a 13.0 ppg, 4.2 apg, helping the Pistons to their first playoff series victory since 1962. The trade of Porter in the 1977–78 season gave Money the job outright and he had his best professional season, averaging 18.6 ppg and 4.7 apg.

The 1978–79 NBA season year was tumultuous for Money as he was traded, in exchange for Porter, to the New Jersey Nets, and then again mid-season to the Philadelphia 76ers. After being waived by Philadelphia at the start of the 1979–80 NBA season, Money then returned to Detroit as a free agent for the 1979–80 Pistons, averaging 10.9 points per game in what would be his final NBA season.

Released by Detroit after the team drafted point guard Isiah Thomas in the 1981 NBA draft, Money tried out with the San Diego Clippers in 1981 but was released before the season began. Money played six seasons (1974–1980) in total, averaging 12.2 ppg in his NBA career.

Out of the league at 24, the influence of teammate Marvin Barnes, a teammate of Money's on the 1976–77 Pistons, came into question. Pistons center, teammate and Hall of Famer Bob Lanier said, “In the ABA, Marvin Barnes was a great, great player that had issues. They took a chance on him, but Marvin was still into street life and he affected Eric Money. Money could shoot the in-between jumper and he might’ve been one of the best that ever played." “A few years ago,” Lanier continues, “I ran into Marvin in Houston and he said, ‘Bob, I used to get high all the time and Eric started to get high with me.’ When somebody tells you that and this is 20-some odd years later, you want put your fist right through their head. And I adored Marvin Barnes – I liked his personality and he's as charming a guy as you'd ever want to meet. But in terms of him trying to be part of the team that wins a championship ... man...”

== Two teams, one game ==
Money is one of three players in NBA history to have played for two teams in a single game, and the only player in NBA history to officially score for two teams in the same game. This was made possible because of officiating mistakes made by referee Richie Powers during a November 1978 game between the Nets and 76ers, when Powers issued three technical fouls each to both a Nets player and the coach (a player is disqualified after two technicals).

The Nets successfully petitioned NBA Commissioner Larry O'Brien for a replay of the third and fourth quarters of the game, which occurred the following March. In the intervening time, Money, Harvey Catchings, and Ralph Simpson were traded between the two teams, with Money joining the 76ers. Al Skinner was also traded, but did not see playing time for either squad, making him the only player in NBA history to have an official DNP for both teams in the same NBA game.

== Personal life ==
Money was one of several professional basketball players to appear in the 1979 film The Fish That Saved Pittsburgh. In 2014, he co-authored a book, Tucson a Basketball Town, which covered the tenure of his coach at Arizona, Fred Snowden, the second black NCAA Division I head coach in history, and the opening of the McKale Center in 1973. Money lives in Arizona where he coaches and provides individualized basketball player development for youth.

== Career statistics ==
Legend
GP	Games played	GS	Games started	MPG	Minutes per game
FG%	Field goal percentage	3P%	3-point field goal percentage	FT%	Free throw percentage
RPG	Rebounds per game	APG	Assists per game	SPG	Steals per game
BPG	Blocks per game	PPG	Points per game	**Bold**	Career high

=== NBA ===
==== Regular season ====
Year	Team	GP	GS	MPG	FG%	3P%	FT%	RPG	APG	SPG	BPG	PPG
1974–75	Detroit	66		13.5	.451		.689	1.3	1.5	.5	.0	4.8
1975–76	Detroit	**80**		28.3	.474		.806	2.6	4.2	**1.7**	.1	13.0
1976–77	Detroit	73		21.7	.521		.789	1.7	3.3	1.2	**.2**	10.2
1977–78	Detroit	76		**33.6**	.500		.718	**2.8**	4.7	1.6	**.2**	**18.6**
1978–79	New Jersey	47		30.5	.481		.743	2.7	**5.3**	1.6	**.2**	16.7
1978–79	Philadelphia	23	0	23.7	**.548**		.630	1.6	3.6	.6	.1	11.8
1979–80	Philadelphia	6	0	13.7	.389	–	**1.000**	1.2	2.7	.0	**.2**	5.0
1979–80	Detroit	55		26.7	.508	–	.779	1.8	4.3	1.0	**.2**	10.9
Career		426	0	25.4	.494	–	.748	2.1	3.8	1.2	.1	12.2

==== Playoffs ====
Year	Team	GP	MPG	FG%	FT%	RPG	APG	SPG	BPG	PPG
1976	Detroit	**9**	30.3	.457	.810	2.4	5.7	1.6	**.1**	12.6
1977	Detroit	3	**34.3**	**.500**	**.846**	**3.0**	**6.7**	**2.0**	.0	**18.3**
1979	Philadelphia	8	16.1	.426	.500	1.4	2.8	.4	.0	6.8
Career		20	25.3	.457	.789	2.1	4.7	1.2	.1	11.1
