= Kevin Porter (basketball, born 1950) =

American basketball player (born 1950)

Personal information
- Born: April 17, 1950 (age 76) Chicago, Illinois, U.S.
- Listed height: 6 ft 0 in (1.83 m)
- Listed weight: 170 lb (77 kg)

Career information
- High school: DuSable (Chicago, Illinois)
- College: Saint Francis (PA) (1968–1972)
- NBA draft: 1972: 3rd round, 39th overall pick
- Drafted by: Baltimore Bullets
- Playing career: 1972–1983
- Position: Point guard
- Number: 10, 1
- Coaching career: 1983–1987

Career history

Playing
- 1972–1975: Baltimore / Capital / Washington Bullets
- 1975–1977: Detroit Pistons
- 1977–1978: New Jersey Nets
- 1978–1979: Detroit Pistons
- 1979–1983: Washington Bullets
- 1983: Toyota Super Corollas

Coaching
- 1983–1987: Saint Francis (PA)

Career highlights
- 4× NBA assists leader (1975, 1978, 1979, 1981); No. 10 retired by Saint Francis Red Flash

Career NBA playing statistics
- Points: 7,645 (11.6 ppg)
- Rebounds: 1,179 (1.8 rpg)
- Assists: 5,314 (8.1 apg)
- Stats at NBA.com
- Stats at Basketball Reference

Career coaching record
- College: 42–68 (.382)

Kevin Porter (born April 17, 1950) is an American former professional basketball player. He played eleven seasons in the National Basketball Association (NBA) and led the league in assists four times in his pro career.

== Amateur career ==
Born and raised in Chicago, Porter graduated from DuSable High School, earning a starting point guard spot as a sophomore, averaging 15 ppg and 7 apg. Steady improvement in his junior (to 20.7 ppg, 9 apg) and senior seasons (22.9 ppg, 13 apg), earned him All-City and All-Area honors in 1968. Porter led DuSable to the last Chicago Daily News Christmas Holiday Tournament Championship.

Porter then played collegiately at Saint Francis University in Loretto, Pennsylvania. Porter thrived at Saint Francis, scoring 1,766 points in his career, averaging 22.9 over four years, including 24.7 ppg as a senior.

== Professional career ==
Over an 11-year NBA career, Porter averaged 11.6 ppg, 8.1 apg, while winning four assist titles. Basketball historian Bijan Bayne said, “What always stood out about Kevin Porter is that he was pass-first, in an era of Pistol, Clyde, Pearl, Tiny, Westphal and Jo Jo. That watered down his star quality. But he had this signature high yo-yo dribble that was under supreme control, as he surveyed with his head up—unusual before Magic. He should be remembered as someone with quickness and vision who orchestrated NBA games against history’s premier guards.” Porter himself added, "That's what I did. I got the ball to scorers. That's what kept me in the league that long."

=== Baltimore / Capital / Washington Bullets (1972–1975) ===
In the 1972 NBA draft, Porter was the 39th overall pick, selected by the Baltimore Bullets in the third round. In his second year, he led the league in personal fouls with 319. While he received 320 the next year, he won a starting role and won the first of four NBA assist titles (8.0 per game) in 1975. The Bullets reached the NBA Finals, but were swept by the underdog Golden State Warriors.

=== Detroit Pistons (1975–1977) ===
In late August 1975, Porter was traded to the Detroit Pistons for Dave Bing and a first round draft pick in 1977, used to select Tree Rollins. Porter suffered a knee injury in the first season with Detroit and appeared in only nineteen games. Returning to the court for the 1976-77 Detroit Pistons season, Porter clashed with coach Herb Brown, telling a Detroit Free Press reporter, "Write this - I want out. He is not man enough to say that the problem is him and me — well, I am. Nothing is going to get solved here." Sports Illustrated covered the tension but the Pistons made the post-season (44–38, .537) despite challenges between Brown and Porter, as well as those with Marvin "Bad News" Barnes in a season PistonsPowered would describe as "absolutely insane, probably the craziest in Pistons history. They won a lot of games, but were completely dysfunctional." John Papanek of Sports Illustrated (SI) would state, "if the Pistons were a TV mini-series, they would make Roots seem like Ding Dong School."

=== New Jersey Nets (1977–1978) ===
In the early start of his third season with the Pistons, the tensions with Brown came to a head as Porter was traded with Howard Porter and cash to the New Jersey Nets for Al Skinner, a 1978 2nd round draft pick (used to select Terry Tyler) and a 1979 2nd round draft pick (used to select Tony Price). Herb Brown was fired as well.

With New Jersey, on February 24, 1978, Porter had 29 assists in a game against the Rockets while with the Nets. He also had 14 points and 5 rebounds in a season that led to his 2nd assist title (10.2 apg). The per-game assist record would stand until Scott Skiles tallied 30 assists on December 30, 1990. Porter also averaged a career high 16.2 ppg for the Nets in 1977–78.

=== Return to Detroit (1978–1979) ===
After the season, Porter was traded back to the Pistons, now led by coach Dick Vitale, in exchange for Eric Money. In that season, he won his third assist title - 13.4 apg, including a remarkable 30 point-25 assist game, on March 9, 1979. Additionally he was the first player to record over 1,000 assists in a single season. It would be five years before another player would record over 1,000 assists. Porter appeared as a member of the Detroit team in the cult classic basketball film The Fish That Saved Pittsburgh in 1979 alongside Pistons teammates Bob Lanier, Eric Money, John Shumate, Chris Ford, and Leon Douglas.

=== Return to the Bullets (1979–1983) ===
After that season, Porter signed as a veteran free agent with the Washington Bullets for 1979–80. The Detroit Pistons received a first round draft pick in 1980 (which ended up with Golden State, who selected Rickey Brown with that pick) and a 1982 first round pick (Used to select John Bagley) as compensation for his departure. Porter appeared in two playoff games that year and garnered nine assists as the Bullets fell in the first round. The following year, he had 9.1 assists per game, which was enough to win his final assist title. However, during training camp before the 1981 season, he snapped his Achilles tendon, missing all of that season.

He only played 11 games of the next season, having only 4.2 assists per game. On January 18, 1983, he was waived by the Bullets. When he retired in 1983, he had accumulated 5,314 career assists (good for 49th all time) and 7,645 career points, while also being 14th all time in career assists per game and 13th in assist percentage at 37.5. Notably, of the top 50 in career assist leaders, he played the fewest games (659). Despite leading the league in assists per game four times, he was never selected to an All Star Game. Only five players have won more assists titles than Porter, and all five of them are in the Hall of Fame (Stockton, Cousy, Robertson, Nash and Kidd).

=== Toyota Super Corollas (1983) ===
In 1983, Porter played in the Philippines for the fabled Toyota Super Corollas team in the Philippine Basketball Association as an import during the 1983 PBA Reinforced Filipino Conference tournament. He scored 50 points in his debut on May 17, 1983, in a 135–141 loss to Tanduay Rhum, but was let go after eight games.

== Post-playing career ==
While Porter was playing in the Philippines, the head coaching job at Saint Francis University became available and Georgetown University coach John Thompson recommended Porter for the job. Porter took over as the Saint Francis head coach on July 11, 1983. During his four seasons as the Saint Francis coach, Porter's record was 42-68 (.382).

Porter then coached at Central State University, a historically black college in Ohio, and then returned to his hometown Chicago, fulfilling a dream to become an elementary physical education teacher, helping at-risk children with after school programs. "I've been blessed. All I wanted was to be a fifth-grade teacher. That was my life. I wanted to be a teacher."

Porter was inducted into the Illinois Basketball Coaches Hall of Fame in 1976, the Cambria County Sports Hall of Fame in 1984 and the Saint Francis Athletics Hall of Fame in 2003. Porter is retired and lives in Chicago.

In January 2022, Washington Wizards announcer Glenn Consor apologized to Houston Rockets guard Kevin Porter Jr. when he commented that Porter Jr. "like his dad, pulled the trigger right at the right time", after he made a key shot, under the mistaken belief that he was the son of Porter, the former Washington point guard. The actual father of Porter Jr., Bryan Kevin Porter Sr., was imprisoned for first-degree manslaughter in the shooting death of a 14-year-old girl in 1993 and was fatally shot in 2004.

== NBA player statistics ==
Legend
GP	Games played	GS	Games started	MPG	Minutes per game
FG%	Field goal percentage	3P%	3-point field goal percentage	FT%	Free throw percentage
RPG	Rebounds per game	APG	Assists per game	SPG	Steals per game
BPG	Blocks per game	PPG	Points per game	**Bold**	Career high
*	Led the league

=== Regular season ===
Year	Team	GP	GS	MPG	FG%	3P%	FT%	RPG	APG	SPG	BPG	PPG
1972–73	Baltimore	71	–	17.1	.455	–	.614	1.0	3.3	–	–	6.6
1973–74	Capital	81	–	28.9	.478	–	.723	2.2	5.8	1.2	0.1	14.0
1974–75	Washington	81	–	32.0	.491	–	.704	1.9	8.0*	**1.9**	0.1	11.6
1975–76	Detroit	19	–	36.2	.421	–	.750	2.3	10.2	1.8	**0.2**	12.6
1976–77	Detroit	81	–	26.1	.512	–	.729	1.2	7.3	1.1	0.1	8.9
1977–78	Detroit	8	–	15.9	.452	–	.692	1.9	4.5	0.6	0.0	4.6
1977–78	New Jersey	74	–	36.3	.470	–	.765	**2.7**	10.8*	1.6	**0.2**	**16.2**
1978–79	Detroit	**82**	–	**37.4**	.481	–	.722	2.5	**13.4***	**1.9**	0.1	15.4
1979–80	Washington	70	–	21.3	.459	.000	.803	1.2	6.5	0.8	**0.2**	7.3
1980–81	Washington	81	–	31.8	.519	**.250**	.773	1.5	9.1*	1.4	0.1	13.4
1982–83	Washington	11	0	19.1	.**525**	–	**.833**	0.5	4.2	0.9	0.0	4.3
Career		659	–	29.0	.483	.188	.737	1.8	8.1	1.4	0.1	11.6

=== Playoffs ===
Year	Team	GP	GS	MPG	FG%	3P%	FT%	RPG	APG	SPG	BPG	PPG
1973	Baltimore	4	–	10.3	.500	–	–	0.5	2.3	–	–	3.0
1974	Capital	7	–	27.9	.388	–	.643	**2.4**	4.6	1.1	0.0	10.7
1975	Washington	**17**	–	**36.8**	**.503**	–	**.667**	**2.4**	**7.3**	1.2	0.0	**14.4**
1977	Detroit	3	–	20.3	.357	–	**.667**	2.0	5.7	0.3	0.0	5.3
1980	Washington	2	–	24.5	.438	.000	.400	1.0	4.5	**1.5**	0.0	8.0
Career		33	–	29.4	.463	.000	.649	2.1	5.8	1.1	0.0	11.0

== See also ==
- List of National Basketball Association career assists leaders
- List of National Basketball Association players with most assists in a game
