= Terry Thomas (basketball) =

American basketball player (1953–1998)

Personal information
- Born: August 20, 1953 Detroit, Michigan, U.S.
- Died: October 26, 1998 (aged 45)
- Listed height: 6 ft 8 in (2.03 m)
- Listed weight: 220 lb (100 kg)

Career information
- High school: Hazel Park (Hazel Park, Michigan)
- College: Detroit Mercy (1972–1975)
- NBA draft: 1975: 9th round, 151st overall pick
- Drafted by: Detroit Pistons
- Position: Power forward
- Number: 50

Career history
- 1975–1976: Detroit Pistons
- Stats at NBA.com
- Stats at Basketball Reference

Terry Thomas (August 20, 1953 – October 26, 1998) was an American National Basketball Association (NBA) player. At 6'8" and 220 lbs, he played as a power forward. He was born in Michigan in 1953, graduated from Hazel Park High School, and went to the University of Detroit Mercy. He was drafted by the Detroit Pistons in the 1975 NBA draft and played one season with them, averaging 2.8 points per game.

== Career statistics ==
Legend
GP	Games played	GS	Games started	MPG	Minutes per game
FG%	Field goal percentage	3P%	3-point field goal percentage	FT%	Free throw percentage
RPG	Rebounds per game	APG	Assists per game	SPG	Steals per game
BPG	Blocks per game	PPG	Points per game	**Bold**	Career high

=== NBA ===
==== Regular season ====
Year	Team	GP	MPG	FG%	FT%	RPG	APG	SPG	BPG	PPG
1975–76	Detroit	28	4.9	.431	.724	1.3	.1	.1	.1	2.8

==== Playoffs ====
Year	Team	GP	MPG	FG%	FT%	RPG	APG	SPG	BPG	PPG
1976	Detroit	4	1.5	.000	–	.3	.0	.0	.0	.0
