= Robert Hawkins (basketball) =

American basketball player (1954–1993)

Personal information
- Born: June 30, 1954 Detroit, Michigan, U.S.
- Died: November 28, 1993 (aged 39) Detroit, Michigan, U.S.
- Listed height: 6 ft 4 in (1.93 m)
- Listed weight: 190 lb (86 kg)

Career information
- High school: Pershing (Detroit, Michigan)
- College: Illinois State (1973–1975)
- NBA draft: 1975: 3rd round, 51st overall pick
- Drafted by: Golden State Warriors
- Playing career: 1975–1979
- Position: Shooting guard
- Number: 12, 11

Career history
- 1975–1976: Golden State Warriors
- 1976–1978: New York/New Jersey Nets
- 1978: Detroit Pistons

Career highlights
- First-team Parade All-American (1972)
- Stats at NBA.com
- Stats at Basketball Reference

Robert L. "Bubbles" Hawkins (June 30, 1954 – November 28, 1993) was an American professional basketball player. He was drafted 51st overall in the 1975 NBA draft by the Golden State Warriors. Hawkins played for four teams during four seasons in the National Basketball Association, averaging 12.7 points per game, 1.5 assists per game and 2.3 rebounds per game.

== Personal ==
Hawkins was married to Barbara Gervin-Hawkins who is the sister of fellow basketball player George Gervin. They had two children.

== Professional career ==
Hawkins was drafted in the third round, 51st overall, by the Golden State Warriors in the 1975 NBA draft. He appeared in 32 games for the Warriors in his rookie season, averaging 3.9 points and 0.9 rebounds in only 4.8 minutes per game. He was released by the Warriors the day before the 1976–77 season began, and after being unable to land a roster spot with another team, was prepared to look for a job in a different industry. In December he was contacted by the New York Nets, in the middle of a disastrous first season in the NBA following the ABA–NBA merger. The Nets had been left short at the guard position following the sale of superstar Julius Erving due to financial difficulties. Hawkins quickly became the closest thing the Nets had to a star, averaging 19.3 points per game and leading Nets head coach Kevin Loughery to remark "All I know is that Bubbles Hawkins has become a hero just when we needed one." That year, on February 7, 1977, Hawkins scored a career best 44 points in a 93–89 win over the New Orleans Jazz. During the festivities of the 1977 NBA All-Star Game, Hawkins faced and lost to Pete Maravich in the first round of an NBA-sanctioned game of horse as part of a televised tournament.

However, Hawkins' NBA prominence would be relatively short lived, and Loughery's high opinion of Hawkins was not extended to the 1977–78 season, with the Nets now playing in New Jersey. Hawkins would play in only 15 games for the Nets that season, before being released after a series of conflicts with the coach. Hawkins would get one more chance in the NBA, signing before the 1978–79 season with the Detroit Pistons, but only appeared in four of the team's first nine games before again being released.

== Death ==
On November 28, 1993, Hawkins was found shot to death in what police said was a suspected crack house in Detroit. No arrests were ever made.

== Career statistics ==
Legend
GP	Games played	GS	Games started	MPG	Minutes per game
FG%	Field goal percentage	3P%	3-point field goal percentage	FT%	Free throw percentage
RPG	Rebounds per game	APG	Assists per game	SPG	Steals per game
BPG	Blocks per game	PPG	Points per game	**Bold**	Career high

=== NBA ===
==== Regular season ====
Year	Team	GP	MPG	FG%	FT%	RPG	APG	SPG	BPG	PPG
1975–76	Golden State	32	4.8	**.510**	.645	.9	.5	.3	.3	3.9
1976–77	New Jersey	**52**	**28.5**	.447	.688	3.0	1.8	**1.5**	.5	**19.3**
1977–78	New Jersey	15	22.9	.460	.862	**3.3**	**2.5**	**1.5**	**.9**	10.9
1978–79	Detroit	4	7.0	.375	**1.000**	1.5	1.0	1.3	.0	4.5
Career		103	19.5	.453	.704	2.3	1.5	1.1	.5	12.7

==== Playoffs ====
Year	Team	GP	MPG	FG%	FT%	RPG	APG	SPG	BPG	PPG
1976	Golden State	5	2.4	.800	1.000	.0	.4	.2	.0	2.0
