= Dave Meyers (basketball) =

American basketball player (1953–2015)

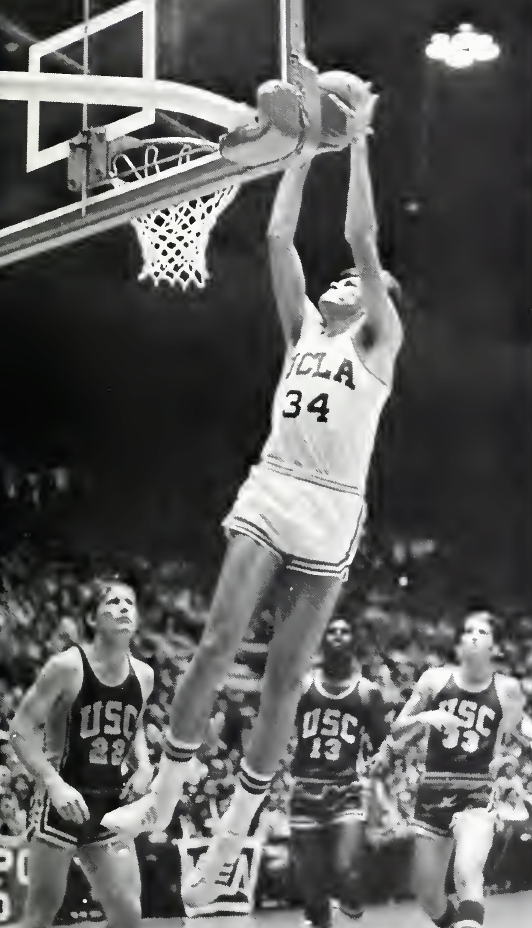
- Meyers with UCLA in 1972–73

Personal information
- Born: April 21, 1953 San Diego, California, U.S.
- Died: October 9, 2015 (aged 62) Temecula, California, U.S.
- Listed height: 6 ft 9 in (2.06 m)
- Listed weight: 215 lb (98 kg)

Career information
- High school: Sonora (La Habra, California)
- College: UCLA (1972–1975)
- NBA draft: 1975: 1st round, 2nd overall pick
- Drafted by: Los Angeles Lakers
- Playing career: 1975–1980
- Position: Power forward
- Number: 21, 22, 7

Career history
- 1975–1980: Milwaukee Bucks

Career highlights
- 2× NCAA champion (1973, 1975); Consensus first-team All-American (1975); First-team All-Pac-8 (1975)

Career NBA statistics
- Points: 3,149 (11.2 ppg)
- Rebounds: 1,771 (6.3 rpg)
- Assists: 652 (2.3 apg)
- Stats at NBA.com
- Stats at Basketball Reference
- Collegiate Basketball Hall of Fame

David William Meyers (April 21, 1953 – October 9, 2015) was an American basketball player for the Milwaukee Bucks of the National Basketball Association (NBA). The power forward played college basketball for the UCLA Bruins. He was a consensus first-team All-American as a senior in 1975, when he won his second national championship with UCLA. He was selected in the first round of the 1975 NBA draft with the second overall pick, and played four years with the Bucks.

== Early life ==
Born in San Diego, California, Meyers was one of 11 children (six girls, five boys) of Bob and Pat Meyers. Bob was a standout basketball player at Marquette University and was the Warriors' captain in 1944–45. Meyers attended high school at Sonora High School in La Habra, California. As a senior, he averaged 22.7 points per game in leading the Raiders to the Orange League title and, in the postseason, the California Southern Section AA championship. Meyers was named AA Player of the Year.

== College career ==
As a sophomore in 1972–73, Meyers played a backup role on the UCLA Bruins men's basketball team, averaging 4.9 points per game, sixth on the team, and 2.9 rebounds. UCLA won the Pac-8 title, went 30–0 and captured the 1973 NCAA championship with an 87–66 win over Memphis State. Meyers recorded four points and three rebounds in the championship game.

As a junior in 1973–74, Meyers became a starter on a front line with future Hall of Famers Bill Walton and Jamaal Wilkes. Meyers averaged 11.4 points and 5.7 rebounds.

In 1974–75, with Walton and Wilkes graduated, the Bruins reloaded and Meyers was the senior starter on a front line with two sophomores and future All-Americans Marques Johnson and Richard Washington. Meyers led the team in both scoring and rebounding with 18.3 points and 7.9 rebounds per game with a .484 field goal percentage. He won the John Wooden Award as UCLA's Most Valuable Player, and he was a consensus first-team All-American. The Bruins went 28–3 and won the NCAA championship in the 1975 NCAA Division I basketball tournament, the team's 10th in a 12-year span, with a 92–85 win over Kentucky. Meyers recorded 24 points and 11 rebounds in the championship game.

Meyers appeared on the cover of Sports Illustrated in 1975 with the headline "UCLA Still Best in the West." He was inducted into the Pac-12 Conference Hall of Honor in March 2015. Myers was inducted into the National Polish-American Sports Hall of Fame in 2026.

== NBA career ==
Meyers was the second overall pick in the 1975 NBA draft by the Los Angeles Lakers. Nineteen days later, Meyers, along with Elmore Smith, Junior Bridgeman, and Brian Winters, was traded to the Milwaukee Bucks in exchange for Kareem Abdul-Jabbar and Walt Wesley.

In his rookie season of 1975–76 with the Bucks, Meyers played 72 games and averaged 22.1 minutes per game. He averaged 7.4 points, 6.2 rebounds and 1.4 assists per game. He posted a then career single-game high of 28 points in just his third NBA game, against the New Orleans Jazz.

In 1976–77, Meyers was limited to 52 games, but his playing time increased to over 25 minutes per game, while he averaged 9.7 points, 6.8 rebounds and 1.7 assists per game, with a .467 field goal percentage. On April 10, 1977, he set a new personal best of 31 points against the San Antonio Spurs.

In 1977–78, his third season, Meyers came into his own as a starter and the Bucks, after two losing seasons, rebounded to a 44–38 record. Playing alongside his former UCLA teammate Marques Johnson, Meyers played 80 games and averaged over 30 minutes per game. Meyers posted a career-high 14.7 points per game along with 6.7 rebounds and a career-high 3.0 assists. On November 15, 1977, he upped his single-game scoring personal best to 32 points, against the Portland Trail Blazers.

Meyers missed the 1978–79 season with a back injury.

In the 1979–80 season, he played 79 games and just under 28 minutes per game as the Bucks went 49–33 and won the NBA Midwest Division. Meyers averaged 12.1 points, 5.7 rebounds and 2.8 assists per game.

After five NBA seasons, on April 30, 1980, Meyers made a surprise announcement that he was retiring from basketball to spend more time with his family and devote more time to his Jehovah's Witness faith.

== Career statistics ==
Legend
GP	Games played	GS	Games started	MPG	Minutes per game
FG%	Field goal percentage	3P%	3-point field goal percentage	FT%	Free throw percentage
RPG	Rebounds per game	APG	Assists per game	SPG	Steals per game
BPG	Blocks per game	PPG	Points per game	**Bold**	Career high

=== NBA ===
==== Regular season ====
Year	Team	GP	GS	MPG	FG%	3P%	FT%	RPG	APG	SPG	BPG	PPG
1975–76	Milwaukee	72	–	22.1	.419	–	.643	6.2	1.4	1.0	0.3	7.4
1976–77	Milwaukee	50	–	25.2	.467	–	.661	**6.8**	1.7	0.8	**0.6**	9.7
1977–78	Milwaukee	**80**	–	**30.2**	.461	–	**.722**	6.7	**3.0**	**1.1**	**0.6**	**14.7**
1979–80	Milwaukee	79	–	27.9	**.481**	**.200**	.634	5.7	2.8	0.9	0.5	12.1
Career		281	–	26.6	.461	.200	.676	6.3	2.3	1.0	0.5	11.2

==== Playoffs ====
Year	Team	GP	GS	MPG	FG%	3P%	FT%	RPG	APG	SPG	BPG	PPG
1976	Milwaukee	3	–	18.0	**.455**	–	**.824**	4.7	0.7	0.3	0.0	8.0
1978	Milwaukee	**9**	–	18.0	.444	–	.667	**8.2**	**3.9**	0.8	**1.2**	**12.9**
1980	Milwaukee	7	–	**27.9**	.419	.000	.467	5.0	2.0	**1.3**	0.9	9.4
Career		19	–	27.8	.436	.000	.629	6.5	2.7	0.9	0.9	10.8

=== College ===
Year	Team	GP	GS	MPG	FG%	3P%	FT%	RPG	APG	SPG	BPG	PPG
1972–73	UCLA Bruins	28	–	–	.477	–	**.756**	2.9	–	–	–	4.9
1973–74	UCLA Bruins	30	–	–	**.488**	–	.701	5.7	–	–	–	11.4
1974–75	UCLA Bruins	**31**	–	–	.484	–	.736	**7.9**	**2.6**	–	–	**18.3**
Career		89	–	–	.485	–	.729	5.6	2.6	–	–	11.8

== Personal life ==
Meyers married his wife, Linda, in 1975. Their daughter Crystal was born a year later, and son Sean followed three years later. Meyers worked as a sales representative for Motorola and took night classes in education at National University. He received his teaching certificate and, beginning in 1988, for many years he served as an elementary school teacher at Railroad Canyon Elementary School in Lake Elsinore, California. He also served as a basketball instructor, both privately and at camps, primarily for children aged 8–12.

Meyers died of cancer in Temecula, California, on October 9, 2015, at the age of 62.

Meyers was the older brother of Ann Meyers, who was also a basketball player and the only woman to sign a free agent contract with an NBA team (Indiana Pacers in 1979).
