= Junior Bridgeman =

American basketball player and businessman (1953–2025)

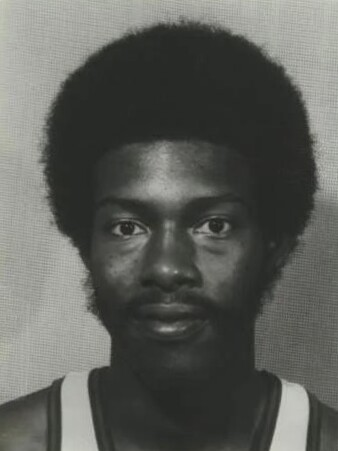
- Bridgeman c. 1977

Personal information
- Born: September 17, 1953 East Chicago, Indiana, U.S.
- Died: March 11, 2025 (aged 71) Louisville, Kentucky, U.S.
- Listed height: 6 ft 5 in (1.96 m)
- Listed weight: 210 lb (95 kg)

Career information
- High school: Washington (East Chicago, Indiana)
- College: Louisville (1972–1975)
- NBA draft: 1975: 1st round, 8th overall pick
- Drafted by: Los Angeles Lakers
- Playing career: 1975–1987
- Position: Small forward / shooting guard
- Number: 2

Career history
- 1975–1984: Milwaukee Bucks
- 1984–1986: Los Angeles Clippers
- 1986–1987: Milwaukee Bucks

Career highlights
- No. 2 retired by Milwaukee Bucks; Second-team All-American – USBWA (1975); Third-team All-American – UPI (1975); 2× MVC Player of the Year (1974, 1975)

Career statistics
- Points: 11,517 (13.6 ppg)
- Rebounds: 2,995 (3.5 rpg)
- Assists: 2,066 (2.4 apg)
- Stats at NBA.com
- Stats at Basketball Reference

Ulysses Lee "Junior" Bridgeman Jr. (September 17, 1953 – March 11, 2025) was an American professional basketball player and businessman. Bridgeman played in the National Basketball Association (NBA) for the Milwaukee Bucks and Los Angeles Clippers from 1975 until 1987. Following his career, Bridgeman owned hundreds of fast-food restaurants, became a Coca-Cola bottler and distributor, and acquired Ebony and Jet magazines. Despite never making more than $350,000 a season during his NBA career, Bridgeman had a net worth of over $1.4 billion, making him one of the wealthiest former athletes in the world.

== Early life ==
Ulysses Lee Bridgeman Jr. was born in East Chicago, Indiana, to Ulysses Lee Bridgeman Sr., a steel mill worker, and Delores (Meaders) Bridgeman, a homemaker. He attended Washington High School and was a member of their 1971 basketball team, which went undefeated (29–0) and won the Indiana state high school basketball championship. Among his teammates were his brother Sam, Pete Trgovich and Tim Stoddard.

== College career ==
A 6-foot-5-inch (1.96 m) guard/forward, Bridgeman attended the University of Louisville and played college basketball for the Louisville Cardinals men's basketball team. Bridgeman was the Missouri Valley Conference Player of the Year in 1974 and 1975. Bridgeman led the Louisville Cardinals to the 1974 NCAA Division I basketball tournament as a junior. As a senior, he led the Cardinals to the Final Four of the 1975 NCAA Division I basketball tournament, where they lost to eventual NCAA champion UCLA 75–74 in the national semifinal. In his collegiate career at Louisville, Bridgeman averaged 15.5 points, 7.6 rebounds and 2.7 assists in 87 games.

== Professional career ==
=== Milwaukee Bucks (1975–1984) ===
The Los Angeles Lakers selected Bridgeman in the first round, with the eighth overall selection, in the 1975 NBA draft. On June 16, 1975, almost three weeks after the draft, the Lakers traded Bridgeman, David Meyers, Elmore Smith and Brian Winters to the Milwaukee Bucks for Kareem Abdul-Jabbar and Walt Wesley.

As a rookie with Milwaukee in 1975–1976 under coach Larry Costello, Bridgeman averaged 8.6 points, 3.6 rebounds and 1.9 assists. In 1976–1977, Costello was fired by Milwaukee after a 3–15 start and assistant coach Don Nelson, who had been a player for the 1976 NBA champion Boston Celtics the year before, was hired as coach. Bridgeman improved, averaging 14.4 points, 5.1 rebounds and 2.5 assists. On December 15, 1976, Bridgeman scored a career-high 41 points in a 129–125 loss against Boston. Nelson and Bridgeman were together for the next eight seasons.

Bridgeman was used by Nelson as a complement to teammates Bob Dandridge, Marques Johnson, Sidney Moncrief, Bob Lanier, Quinn Buckner, Myers, Winters and Mickey Johnson during his Milwaukee tenure, as the Bucks had powerful teams, winning division titles in 1980, 1981, 1982, 1983 and 1984.

On April 5, 1981, Bridgeman scored a career playoff-high 32 points and recorded six assists in a Game 1 Eastern Conference semifinals loss to the Philadelphia 76ers.

=== Los Angeles Clippers (1984–1986) ===
After nine seasons in Milwaukee, on September 29, 1984, Bridgeman was traded by the Bucks with Harvey Catchings, Marques Johnson and cash to the Los Angeles Clippers for Terry Cummings, Craig Hodges and Ricky Pierce. On January 29, 1985, Bridgeman scored 30 points in a loss against the Cleveland Cavaliers.

=== Milwaukee Bucks (1986–1987) ===
After spending two years in Los Angeles, Bridgeman returned to Milwaukee for one more season before retiring in 1987. He played in 711 games for the Bucks, at the time the most in franchise history. This was surpassed on March 20, 2023, by Giannis Antetokounmpo. In his 12-year NBA career, Bridgeman scored 11,517 points.

=== Overall ===
Bridgeman played as a sixth man for most of his career, averaging double figures in scoring for nine consecutive seasons. Some believe that if the NBA Sixth Man of the Year Award had existed before the 1982–83 season, he might have won it multiple times. In his career with the Bucks and Clippers, Bridgeman played in 849 games, averaging 13.6 points, 3.5 rebounds and 2.6 assists, shooting 47% on field goals and 84% from the foul line.

Bridgeman also served as the president of the National Basketball Players Association from 1985 to 1988. Bridgeman resigned after the 1988 collective bargaining agreement and the controversy of the Junior Bridgeman antitrust lawsuit, in which NBA players sued the NBA for violation of antitrust laws. The players argued that by compensating to eschew from matching offers for free agents and abuse of the salary cap, players' share of gross revenues decreased from 61 percent to 54 percent from the 1983–84 season.

== Entrepreneurial career ==
During the off-seasons of his playing career, Bridgeman worked at Wendy's and learned the business model of the fast food restaurant franchise. After retiring from the NBA, he invested in the franchise and eventually owned over 450 fast-food restaurants, including over 160 Wendy's and 120 Chili's restaurants. In 2016, he sold 120 Chili's and 100 Wendy's to a private buyer and started a Coca-Cola bottling company to distribute their beverage brands.

In 2016, Forbes ranked Bridgeman the fourth-wealthiest retired athlete in the world behind only Michael Jordan, David Beckham and Arnold Palmer with an estimated income of $32 million.

As president and CEO of Bridgeman Foods Inc, Bridgeman signed a letter of intent to buy bottling operations in Canada in 2018.

In December 2020, Bridgeman, via Bridgeman Sports and Media, bought Ebony and Jet for $14 million after the magazines had declared bankruptcy earlier in the year.

On May 26, 2022, Manna Capital Partners, an investment firm cofounded by Bridgeman, announced that the firm had partnered with Ball Corporation to construct and operate an integrated secondary aluminum mill in Los Lunas, New Mexico. On October 18, 2022, Alabama Governor Kay Ivey announced that Manna Capital Partners would invest in a bottling facility to be located in Hope Hull, Alabama and operated by affiliate Manna Beverages & Ventures.

On September 24, 2024, the Bucks announced that Bridgeman had purchased a 10% interest in the team, with the deal valuing the franchise at $4 billion. According to Bucks co-owner Jimmy Haslam, Bridgeman purchased the interests of several minority owners at an undisclosed discount from the stated value.

== NBA career statistics ==
Legend
GP	Games played	GS	Games started	MPG	Minutes per game
FG%	Field goal percentage	3P%	3-point field goal percentage	FT%	Free throw percentage
RPG	Rebounds per game	APG	Assists per game	SPG	Steals per game
BPG	Blocks per game	PPG	Points per game	**Bold**	Career high

=== Regular season ===
Year	Team	GP	GS	MPG	FG%	3P%	FT%	RPG	APG	SPG	BPG	PPG
1975–76	Milwaukee	81	–	20.3	.439	–	.795	3.6	1.9	0.6	0.3	8.6
1976–77	Milwaukee	**82**	–	29.4	.449	.000	.864	**5.1**	2.5	1.0	0.3	14.4
1977–78	Milwaukee	**82**	–	22.9	.503	.000	.810	3.5	2.1	0.9	0.4	13.6
1978–79	Milwaukee	**82**	–	23.9	**.506**	.000	.829	3.6	2.0	1.1	**0.5**	15.5
1979–80	Milwaukee	81	–	28.6	.478	.185	.865	3.7	2.9	**1.2**	0.2	**17.6**
1980–81	Milwaukee	77	–	28.8	.487	.143	.884	3.8	3.0	1.1	0.4	16.8
1981–82	Milwaukee	41	4	22.5	.483	**.444**	.864	3.0	2.7	0.7	0.1	12.5
1982–83	Milwaukee	70	5	26.5	.492	.077	.837	3.5	3.0	0.6	0.1	14.4
1983–84	Milwaukee	81	10	**30.0**	.465	.194	.807	4.1	**3.3**	0.7	0.2	15.1
1984–85	LA Clippers	80	**15**	25.5	.465	.359	.879	2.9	2.1	0.6	0.2	13.9
1985–86	LA Clippers	58	14	20.0	.441	.333	**.891**	2.1	1.9	0.5	0.1	8.8
1986–87	Milwaukee	34	4	12.3	.462	.167	.800	1.5	1.0	0.3	0.1	5.1
Career		849	52	25.0	.475	.244	.846	3.5	2.4	0.8	0.3	13.6

=== Playoffs ===
Year	Team	GP	GS	MPG	FG%	3P%	FT%	RPG	APG	SPG	BPG	PPG
1975–76	Milwaukee	3	–	22.3	.450	–	.636	3.7	1.7	0.3	0.0	8.3
1977–78	Milwaukee	9	–	19.8	**.484**	–	.750	2.0	1.2	1.0	0.2	10.4
1979–80	Milwaukee	5	–	24.8	.357	.000	.733	3.8	**3.4**	1.0	**0.4**	10.2
1980–81	Milwaukee	7	–	26.1	.462	**1.000**	.813	2.1	3.3	0.9	0.0	14.0
1982–83	Milwaukee	9	–	**34.2**	.469	.400	**.933**	**5.0**	3.1	**1.1**	0.2	**16.9**
1983–84	Milwaukee	**16**	–	31.2	.456	.111	.815	4.0	2.8	0.4	0.3	14.4
Career		49	–	27.7	.454	.250	.814	3.5	2.6	0.8	0.2	13.3

== Personal life and death ==
Bridgeman was married for 50 years to Doris Griffith, who survived him. They had three children: Justin, Ryan and Eden. At the time of his death, he had six grandchildren. Ryan operates 230+ restaurants that Junior owned through his company, Manna, Inc. Eden is the CEO of Ebony and Jet, as well as the CMO of Manna, Inc.

Bridgeman was a member of Alpha Phi Alpha fraternity. In 2008, the PGA of America appointed Bridgeman to serve on the PGA Board of Directors. The Naismith Basketball Hall of Fame appointed Bridgeman to the board of governors in 2010. Churchill Downs appointed Bridgeman to the company's board of directors in 2012. In 2016–2017 Bridgeman was appointed and served on the University of Louisville Board of Trustees. Bridgeman was also a member of the Simmons College of Kentucky board of trustees.

Bridgeman was honored numerous times at Bucks games following his retirement, and made regular appearances at Bucks games for bobblehead nights and autograph signings during charity donation-drive events.

On the Bucks' appearance in the 2021 NBA Finals, and recalling his Bucks teams repeated Eastern Conference Finals losses, Bridgeman said "You know, we all wore the same jersey at some point in time. So, you feel a relationship there and you know, so much admiration for the guys that are able to get to the Finals. You know, that was our dream of ours and unfortunately, we ran into a couple of guys in Boston and Philly at the time, but they've been able to do it and just wishing them all the luck in the world."

Bridgeman was a member of the Louisville megachurch Southeast Christian Church.

Bridgeman died in Louisville on March 11, 2025, after suffering a heart attack at an event at the Galt House Hotel. He was 71. A public memorial service was held on March 22 at the Southeast Christian main campus, following which he was buried at Cave Hill Cemetery.

== Honors ==
- Bridgeman's No. 2 jersey was retired by the Milwaukee Bucks in 1988.
- In 1999, Bridgeman was inducted into the Wisconsin Athletic Hall of Fame.
- Bridgeman was inducted into the University of Louisville College of Arts and Sciences Hall of Fame in 2007.
- In 2009, Bridgeman was inducted into the Missouri Valley Conference Hall of Fame.
- In 2009, a portion of Grace Street in East Chicago, Indiana, was named in honor of Bridgeman.
- In 2014, Bridgeman was inducted into the Kentucky Entrepreneur Hall of Fame.
- In 2019, Bridgeman received the Gold Cup award from Greater Louisville Inc. in honor of his business contributions and community involvement.
