= Clyde Mayes =

American basketball player (born 1953)

Personal information
- Born: March 17, 1953 (age 73) Greenville, South Carolina, U.S.
- Listed height: 6 ft 8 in (2.03 m)
- Listed weight: 225 lb (102 kg)

Career information
- High school: Wade Hampton (Greenville, South Carolina)
- College: Furman (1972–1975)
- NBA draft: 1975: 2nd round, 22nd overall pick
- Drafted by: Milwaukee Bucks
- Playing career: 1975–1989
- Position: Power forward
- Number: 34, 22

Career history
- 1975–1976: Milwaukee Bucks
- 1976: Indiana Pacers
- 1976: Buffalo Braves
- 1977: Portland Trail Blazers
- 1977–1981: Mecap Vigevano
- 1981–1983: Stade Français
- 1983–1984: Binova Bergamo
- 1984–1985: Jollycolombani Cantù
- 1985–1987: Bàsquet Manresa
- 1988–1989: Pamesa Valencia

Career highlights
- Third-team All-American – AP (1975); 2× SoCon Player of the Year (1974, 1975); No. 34 retired by Furman Paladins

Career NBA statistics
- Points: 297 (4.0 ppg)
- Rebounds: 279 (3.8 rpg)
- Assists: 40 (0.5 apg)
- Stats at NBA.com
- Stats at Basketball Reference

Clyde Clauthen Mayes Jr. (born March 17, 1953) is an American former professional basketball player. He played in both the National Basketball Association (NBA) and in Europe for various teams. His international career took him to Italy, France and Spain over the course of 12 years. At 6 ft 8 in (2.03 m) tall and weighing 225 pounds, Mayes primarily played the power forward position.

== Basketball career ==
=== College ===
Mayes grew up in Greenville, South Carolina and played basketball at Wade Hampton High School in his hometown. In the fall of 1971, Mayes enrolled at Furman University, also located in Greenville. National Collegiate Athletic Association (NCAA) rules at the time prohibited college freshmen from competing on their schools' varsity sports teams, so Mayes had to play for the Furman freshman basketball team. When he became eligible during his sophomore season in 1972–73, Mayes ended up playing in 29 games while averaging 15.2 points and 11.1 rebounds per game. The Paladins finished as the Southern Conference regular season runners-up (to Davidson) but won the Southern Conference Tournament championship. They qualified for the 1973 NCAA Men's Division I Basketball Tournament but lost to Syracuse in the first round, 83–82.

The following season, Mayes was the star on a team that finished 22–9, including 11–1 in conference play, en route to conference regular season and tournament championships. He averaged 17.3 points and 13.0 rebounds on the year, and Furman would once again qualify for the NCAA Tournament. They finished in fourth place in the East Region, losing to Providence, 95–83, to end their season, after losing to Pitt (University of Pittsburgh) in the Sweet 16, 81–78. After the season, Mayes was honored as the Southern Conference Player of the Year.

As a senior in 1974–75, Mayes led the Paladins to second and third consecutive conference regular season and tournament championships, respectively, as well as a third straight NCAA Tournament berth (they lost in the second round to Boston College). Furman compiled a 22–7 overall record, including a perfect 12–0 conference record. In the 2009 book, ESPN College Basketball Encyclopedia: The Complete History of the Men's Game, the 1974–75 team was named the best in the program's history. It was led by Mayes, who repeated at the Southern Conference Player of the Year and also honored as a Third Team All-American by the Associated Press. He averaged 21.1 points and 13.5 rebounds for the year, but he also had a stellar supporting cast. Fessor "Moose" Leonard was a 7 ft 1 in (2.16 m) center who averaged 15.5 points per game, and 6 ft 7 in (2.01 m) Craig Lynch provided a strong defensive presence.

The personal accolades for Mayes kept coming, as he was named the Southern Conference Athlete of the Year, which is an award given to an athlete in the conference irrespective of sport or season. In 2010, The Charlotte Observer listed Mayes as one of the five best men's basketball players in the Southern Conference during the 1970s.

=== Professional ===
After Mayes' collegiate career ended, the Milwaukee Bucks selected him as the 22nd overall pick in the 1975 NBA draft. He played in 65 games for the Bucks as a rookie in 1975–76. Just prior to the start of the 1976–77 season he was waived. For the remainder of the season, Mayes was temporarily signed and released by three different teams—the Indiana Pacers, Buffalo Braves and Portland Trail Blazers—and appeared in no more than five games for any of them. He decided that he would have greater success overseas, and so starting in the 1977–78 basketball season Mayes found himself playing in Italy.

Over the course of the next 12 seasons, Mayes played for teams in Italy, France and Spain. In 1983–84 he was named an All-Star in Legadue Basket while playing for Alpe Bergamo.

== Career statistics ==
Legend
GP	Games played	GS	Games started	MPG	Minutes per game
FG%	Field goal percentage	3P%	3-point field goal percentage	FT%	Free throw percentage
RPG	Rebounds per game	APG	Assists per game	SPG	Steals per game
BPG	Blocks per game	PPG	Points per game	**Bold**	Career high

=== NBA ===
==== Regular season ====
Year	Team	GP	MPG	FG%	FT%	RPG	APG	SPG	BPG	PPG
1975–76	Milwaukee	**65**	**14.6**	**.460**	.577	**4.0**	.6	**.1**	.6	**4.4**
1976–77	Indiana	2	10.0	.429	.250	3.5	**1.5**	.0	**1.0**	3.5
1976–77	Buffalo	2	3.5	.000	**.667**	1.5	.0	.0	.0	1.0
1976–77	Portland	5	4.8	.222	–	1.2	.0	.0	.4	.8
Career		74	13.5	.446	.567	3.8	.5	.1	.6	4.0

==== Playoffs ====
Year	Team	GP	MPG	FG%	FT%	RPG	APG	SPG	BPG	PPG
1976	Milwaukee	3	13.7	.200	.750	2.0	.3	.3	.3	1.7
