= 1975–76 Detroit Pistons season =

NBA team season

- Head coach: Ray Scott (fired); Herb Brown
- General manager: Oscar Feldman
- Owner: Bill Davidson
- Arena: Cobo Arena

Results
- Record: 36–46 (.439)
- Place: Division: 2nd (Midwest); Conference: 5th (Western)
- Playoff finish: Conference semifinals (lost to Warriors 2–4)
- Stats at Basketball Reference

The 1975–76 Detroit Pistons season was the Detroit Pistons' 28th season in the NBA and 19th season in the city of Detroit. The team played at Cobo Arena in downtown Detroit.

The Pistons made a major move in the off-season, trading perennial All-Star Dave Bing to the Washington Bullets for NBA assist leader Kevin Porter. Porter would only play 19 games for the Pistons in 1975–76, missing the bulk of the season with an injury. Bing represented Washington at the 1976 NBA All-Star Game, honored as the game MVP. The team also made a move at mid-season, firing coach Ray Scott. Greg Eno from Out of Bounds described his January dismissal, "Thirty years ago and a month, Scott was conducting practice -- the Pistons were in a terrible slump at the time -- and management strode onto the court, relieved Ray Scott of his silver whistle, and marched him off the court to give him the Ziggy -- that Detroit word for a coach getting fired. The Pistons hadn't yet learned to act with class in 1976. They were still a bush league franchise, even though Bing and Scott and Lanier had combined to put pro basketball on the map in Detroit. So the firing of Scott -- in front of his stunned players -- in January 1976 was done with all the subtlety of July 4th fireworks." He was replaced by assistant Herb Brown.

The Pistons finished with a 36-46 (.439) record, 2nd place in the Midwest Division. The team was led by forward Curtis Rowe (16.0 ppg, 8.7 apg, NBA All-Star) and center Bob Lanier (21.3 ppg, 11.7 rpg). Detroit advanced to the 1976 NBA Playoffs, winning 10 of their 11 final games, and then won their first round series of the Western Conference playoffs 2–1 over the Milwaukee Bucks, the team's first playoff series win since the 1961-62 Detroit Pistons season. Detroit won the deciding 3rd game of the series in Milwaukee 107–104, securing the win with a late Chris Ford steal. The team then fell to the Golden State Warriors 4–2 in the Western Conference Semi-Finals, dropping the 6th game in overtime 118–116 at Cobo Arena in Detroit.

== Draft picks ==
Round	Pick	Player	Position	Nationality	College
4	64	Lindsay Hairston	Forward	United States	Michigan State
9	151	Terry Thomas	Forward	United States	Detroit

== Roster ==
1975–76 Detroit Pistons roster
Players

Pos.	No.	Player	Height	Weight	DOB	From
C	20	Roger Brown	6 ft 11 in (2.11 m)	225 lb (102 kg)	1950-02-23	Kansas
SG	11	Archie Clark	6 ft 2 in (1.88 m)	175 lb (79 kg)	1941-07-15	Minnesota
SG	22	Henry Dickerson	6 ft 4 in (1.93 m)	204 lb (93 kg)	1951-11-27	College of Charleston
SF	44	Al Eberhard	6 ft 6 in (1.98 m)	225 lb (102 kg)	1952-05-10	Missouri
SG	42	Chris Ford	6 ft 5 in (1.96 m)	190 lb (86 kg)	1949-01-11	Villanova
SF	45	Lindsay Hairston	6 ft 7 in (2.01 m)	180 lb (82 kg)	1951-12-08	Michigan State
C	16	Bob Lanier	6 ft 11 in (2.11 m)	250 lb (113 kg)	1948-09-10	St. Bonaventure
SG	15	John Mengelt	6 ft 2 in (1.88 m)	195 lb (88 kg)	1949-10-16	Auburn
PG	14	Eric Money	6 ft 0 in (1.83 m)	175 lb (79 kg)	1955-02-06	Arizona
SF	54	Howard Porter	6 ft 8 in (2.03 m)	220 lb (100 kg)	1948-08-31	Villanova
PG	10	Kevin Porter	6 ft 0 in (1.83 m)	190 lb (86 kg)	1950-04-17	Saint Francis (PA)
PF	18	Curtis Rowe	6 ft 7 in (2.01 m)	225 lb (102 kg)	1949-07-02	UCLA
PF	50	Terry Thomas	6 ft 8 in (2.03 m)	220 lb (100 kg)	1953-08-20	Detroit Mercy
PF	31	George Trapp	6 ft 8 in (2.03 m)	205 lb (93 kg)	1948-07-11	Long Beach State

Coaches
Head coach
- Herb Brown
Assistant(s)
- Jim Davis
- Mike Abdenour (trainer)

Legend
- (DP) Unsigned draft pick
- (FA) Free agent
- (S) Suspended
- Injured

Roster
Updated: February 24, 1976

== Regular season ==
=== Season standings ===
Midwest Division	W	L	PCT	GB	Home	Road	Div
y-Milwaukee Bucks	38	44	.463	–	22–19	16–25	13–8
x-Detroit Pistons	36	46	.439	2	24–17	12–29	12–9
Kansas City Kings	31	51	.378	7	25–16	6–35	10–11
Chicago Bulls	24	58	.293	14	15–26	9–32	7–14

#	Western Conference				
#	Team	W	L	PCT	GB
1	z-Golden State Warriors	59	23	.720	–
2	x-Seattle SuperSonics	43	39	.524	16
3	x-Phoenix Suns	42	40	.512	17
4	y-Milwaukee Bucks	38	44	.463	21
5	x-Detroit Pistons	36	46	.439	23
6	Los Angeles Lakers	40	42	.488	19
7	Portland Trail Blazers	37	45	.451	22
8	Kansas City Kings	31	51	.378	28
9	Chicago Bulls	24	58	.293	35

z – clinched division title
y – clinched division title
x – clinched playoff spot

== Playoffs ==
1976 playoff game log
First Round: 2–1 (home: 1–0; road: 1–1)

Game	Date	Team	Score	High points	High rebounds	High assists	Location Attendance	Series
1	April 13	@ Milwaukee	L 107–110	Bob Lanier (25)	Bob Lanier (15)	Lanier, Clark (6)	MECCA Arena; 8,912	0–1
2	April 16	Milwaukee	W 126–123	Bob Lanier (35)	Curtis Rowe (10)	Money, Clark (5)	Cobo Arena; 8,330	1–1
3	April 18	@ Milwaukee	W 107–104	Bob Lanier (28)	Bob Lanier (12)	Eric Money (8)	MECCA Arena; 8,213	2–1

Conference Semifinals: 2–4 (home: 1–2; road: 1–2)

Game	Date	Team	Score	High points	High rebounds	High assists	Location Attendance	Series
1	April 20	@ Golden State	L 103–127	Bob Lanier (18)	Bob Lanier (16)	Chris Ford (7)	Oakland–Alameda County Coliseum Arena; 13,067	0–1
2	April 22	@ Golden State	W 123–111	Curtis Rowe (33)	Curtis Rowe (10)	Chris Ford (9)	Oakland–Alameda County Coliseum Arena; 13,067	1–1
3	April 24	Golden State	L 96–113	Bob Lanier (23)	Bob Lanier (16)	Eric Money (8)	Cobo Arena; 10,022	1–2
4	April 26	Golden State	W 106–102	Bob Lanier (30)	Bob Lanier (11)	Eric Money (7)	Cobo Arena; 11,389	2–2
5	April 28	@ Golden State	L 109–128	Howard Porter (20)	Bob Lanier (12)	Archie Clark (5)	Oakland–Alameda County Coliseum Arena; 13,067	2–3
6	April 30	Golden State	L 116–118 (OT)	Bob Lanier (30)	Bob Lanier (16)	Eric Money (9)	Cobo Arena; 10,361	2–4

1976 schedule
