= Gary Brokaw =

American basketball player and coach (born 1954)

Personal information
- Born: January 11, 1954 (age 72) New Brunswick, New Jersey, U.S.
- Listed height: 6 ft 4 in (1.93 m)
- Listed weight: 178 lb (81 kg)

Career information
- High school: New Brunswick (New Brunswick, New Jersey)
- College: Notre Dame (1972–1974)
- NBA draft: 1974: 1st round, 18th overall pick
- Drafted by: Milwaukee Bucks
- Playing career: 1974–1977
- Position: Shooting guard
- Number: 25, 7

Career history

Playing
- 1974–1977: Milwaukee Bucks
- 1977: Cleveland Cavaliers
- 1977: Buffalo Braves

Coaching
- 1986–1991: Iona

Career highlights
- Third-team All-American – UPI (1974)

Career statistics
- Points: 1,928 (8.0 ppg)
- Rebounds: 407 (1.7 rpg)
- Assists: 715 (3.0 apg)
- Stats at NBA.com
- Stats at Basketball Reference

Gary George Brokaw (born January 11, 1954) is an American former basketball player and coach. After an All-American college career for the Notre Dame Fighting Irish, Brokaw played four seasons in the National Basketball Association (NBA). Following his playing career, Brokaw became a coach.

== Playing career ==
Brokaw attended New Brunswick High School. He played collegiately for the University of Notre Dame.

He was selected by the Milwaukee Bucks in the first round (18th pick overall) of the 1974 NBA draft.

He played for the Bucks (1974–76), Cleveland Cavaliers (1976–77) and Buffalo Braves (1977–78) in the NBA for 241 games.

== NBA career statistics ==
Legend
GP	Games played	GS	Games started	MPG	Minutes per game
FG%	Field goal percentage	3P%	3-point field goal percentage	FT%	Free throw percentage
RPG	Rebounds per game	APG	Assists per game	SPG	Steals per game
BPG	Blocks per game	PPG	Points per game	**Bold**	Career high

=== Regular season ===
Year	Team	GP	GS	MPG	FG%	3P%	FT%	RPG	APG	SPG	BPG	PPG
1974–75	Milwaukee	73	-	**22.5**	.455	-	.685	**2.0**	3.0	0.4	0.2	8.1
1975–76	Milwaukee	**75**	-	19.6	**.457**	-	.700	1.7	**3.3**	**0.5**	0.2	8.4
1976–77	Milwaukee	41	-	21.7	.401	-	.766	1.6	2.7	**0.5**	**0.6**	**8.9**
1976–77	Cleveland	39	-	15.3	.467	-	.707	1.5	3.0	0.4	0.3	7.2
1977–78	Buffalo	13	-	10.0	.419	-	**.750**	0.9	1.5	0.2	0.4	4.2
Career		241	-	19.6	.446	-	.713	1.7	3.0	0.4	0.3	8.0

=== Playoffs ===
Year	Team	GP	GS	MPG	FG%	3P%	FT%	RPG	APG	SPG	BPG	PPG
1975–76	Milwaukee	**3**	-	**36.0**	**.622**	-	**.944**	**3.7**	**8.0**	**1.0**	1.0	**21.0**
1976–77	Cleveland	**3**	-	14.7	.474	-	.333	1.3	4.0	0.7	0.3	6.7
Career		6	-	25.3	.571	-	.792	2.5	6.0	0.8	0.7	13.8

== Coaching career ==
In the 1980s he worked as a head coach for Iona College basketball team and as an assistant coach for Notre Dame under Digger Phelps. He later worked as NBA director of basketball operations (1991–95) and an assistant coach for the Charlotte Bobcats (2004–05), where he was hired to replace Sam Mitchell after Mitchell left the Bobcats to become the head coach for the Toronto Raptors.

Brokaw continues to coach in the Tampa Bay area with the private coaching service, CoachUp.
