= 1975–76 Milwaukee Bucks season =

NBA professional basketball team season

- Division champions
- Head coach: Larry Costello
- Arena: MECCA Arena

Results
- Record: 38–44 (.463)
- Place: Division: 1st (Midwest); Conference: 4th (Western)
- Playoff finish: West First Round (lost to Pistons 1–2)
- Stats at Basketball Reference

The 1975–76 Milwaukee Bucks season was the Bucks' eighth season in the NBA.

It was the team's first season since its inaugural year without Kareem Abdul-Jabbar, who was traded to the Los Angeles Lakers during the offseason. The Bucks would have a 38–44 record, the worst record in NBA history for a team to win its division.

== Draft picks ==
Round	Pick	Player	Position	Nationality	College
2	22	Clyde Mayes	PF	United States	Furman
2	24	Cornelius Cash	F	United States	Bowling Green State
3	43	Brian Hammel		United States	Bentley
4	60	Bill Campion	C	United States	Manhattan
6	96	Oliver Purnell		United States	Old Dominion
7	115	Wilbur Thomas		United States	American
8	132	Bob McCurdy	SG	United States	Richmond
9	150	Eric Hays		United States	Montana
10	165	Romy Thomas		United States	Wisconsin-Eau Claire

== Roster ==
1975–76 Milwaukee Bucks roster
Players

Pos.	No.	Player	Height	Weight	DOB	From
SF	2	Junior Bridgeman	6 ft 5 in (1.96 m)	210 lb (95 kg)	1953–09–17	Louisville
SG	25	Gary Brokaw	6 ft 4 in (1.93 m)	178 lb (81 kg)	1954–01–11	Notre Dame
SF	10	Bob Dandridge	6 ft 6 in (1.98 m)	195 lb (88 kg)	1947–11–15	Norfolk State
SF	20	Mickey Davis	6 ft 7 in (2.01 m)	195 lb (88 kg)	1950–06–16	Duquesne
C	31	Jim Fox	6 ft 10 in (2.08 m)	230 lb (104 kg)	1943–04–07	South Carolina
PF	34	Clyde Mayes	6 ft 8 in (2.03 m)	225 lb (102 kg)	1953–03–17	Furman
SG	14	Jon McGlocklin	6 ft 5 in (1.96 m)	205 lb (93 kg)	1943–06–10	Indiana
PF	21	Dave Meyers	6 ft 8 in (2.03 m)	215 lb (98 kg)	1953–04–21	UCLA
PG	15	Jim Price	6 ft 3 in (1.91 m)	195 lb (88 kg)	1949–11–27	Louisville
PF	18	Kevin Restani	6 ft 9 in (2.06 m)	225 lb (102 kg)	1951–12–23	San Francisco
C	3	Elmore Smith	7 ft 0 in (2.13 m)	250 lb (113 kg)	1949–05–09	Kentucky State
SG	32	Brian Winters	6 ft 4 in (1.93 m)	185 lb (84 kg)	1952–03–01	South Carolina

Coaches
Head coach
- Larry Costello
Assistant(s)
- Jack McKinney

Legend
- (DP) Unsigned draft pick
- (FA) Free agent
- (S) Suspended
- Injured

== Regular season ==
=== Season standings ===
Midwest Division	W	L	PCT	GB	Home	Road	Div
y-Milwaukee Bucks	38	44	.463	–	22–19	16–25	13–8
x-Detroit Pistons	36	46	.439	2	24–17	12–29	12–9
Kansas City Kings	31	51	.378	7	25–16	6–35	10–11
Chicago Bulls	24	58	.293	14	15–26	9–32	7–14

#	Western Conference				
#	Team	W	L	PCT	GB
1	z-Golden State Warriors	59	23	.720	–
2	x-Seattle SuperSonics	43	39	.524	16
3	x-Phoenix Suns	42	40	.512	17
4	y-Milwaukee Bucks	38	44	.463	21
5	x-Detroit Pistons	36	46	.439	23
6	Los Angeles Lakers	40	42	.488	19
7	Portland Trail Blazers	37	45	.451	22
8	Kansas City Kings	31	51	.378	28
9	Chicago Bulls	24	58	.293	35

z – clinched division title
y – clinched division title
x – clinched playoff spot

=== Game log ===
1975–76 game log
Total: 38–44 (home: 0–0; road: 0–0)
October: 0–3 (home: 0–2; road: 0–1)

Game	Date	Team	Score	High points	High rebounds	High assists	Location Attendance	Record
1	October 25, 1975	Chicago	L 87–91	Brian Winters (21)			MECCA Arena	0–1
2	October 28, 1975	Los Angeles	L 92–99	Dave Meyers (21)			MECCA Arena	0–2
3	October 31, 1975	@ New Orleans	L 85–100	Dave Meyers (28)			Louisiana Superdome	0–3

November: 7–8 (home: 4–3; road: 3–5)

Game	Date	Team	Score	High points	High rebounds	High assists	Location Attendance	Record
4	November 1, 1975	Portland	L 97–113				MECCA Arena	0–4
5	November 2, 1975	@ Houston	L 89–104				The Summit	0–5
6	November 4, 1975	Detroit	W 103–101				MECCA Arena	1–5
7	November 7, 1975	Boston	W 104–101				MECCA Arena	2–5
8	November 8, 1975	@ Washington	W 99–95	Brian Winters (27)			Capital Centre	3–5
9	November 11, 1975	Philadelphia	W 108–81				MECCA Arena	4–5
10	November 12, 1975	@ Philadelphia	W 107–84				The Spectrum	5-5
11	November 14, 1975	Buffalo	L 98–112				MECCA Arena	5–6
12	November 15, 1975	@ Detroit	L 89–101				Cobo Center	5–7
13	November 19, 1975	@ Phoenix	W 96–94				Arizona Veterans Memorial Coliseum	6–7
14	November 21, 1975	@ Los Angeles	L 104–116				The Forum	6–8
15	November 23, 1975	@ Seattle	L 104–112				Seattle Center Coliseum	6–9
16	November 27, 1975	Golden State	L 105–106				MECCA Arena	6–10
17	November 28, 1975	@ Chicago	L 69–89				Chicago Stadium	6–11
18	November 29, 1975	Chicago	W 88–85				MECCA Arena	7–11

December: 6–7 (home: 4–2; road: 2–5)

Game	Date	Team	Score	High points	High rebounds	High assists	Location Attendance	Record
19	December 3, 1975	Portland	W 114–92				MECCA Arena	8–11
20	December 5, 1975	Kansas City	W 105–92				MECCA Arena	9–11
21	December 9, 1975	@ New York	W 109–100				Madison Square Garden	10–11
22	December 10, 1975	@ Boston	L 98–111				Boston Garden	10–12
23	December 12, 1975	Cleveland	L 91–109				MECCA Arena	10–13
24	December 17, 1975	@ Phoenix	L 111–116				Arizona Veterans Memorial Coliseum	10–14
25	December 20, 1975	@ Golden State	L 87–124				Oakland Coliseum Arena	10–15
26	December 21, 1975	@ Seattle	W 103–101				Seattle Center Coliseum	11–15
27	December 23, 1975	New York	L 108–110				MECCA Arena	11–16
28	December 26, 1975	Washington	W 85–81				MECCA Arena	12–16
29	December 27, 1975	@ Atlanta	L 82–87				Omni Coliseum	12–17
30	December 28, 1975	Phoenix	W 88–85				MECCA Arena	13–17
31	December 30, 1975	@ Buffalo	L 106–118				Buffalo Memorial Auditorium	13–18

January: 2–1 (home: 1–1; road: 1–0)

Game	Date	Team	Score	High points	High rebounds	High assists	Location Attendance	Record
32	January 2, 1976	@ Detroit	W 98–83				Cobo Arena	14–18
33	January 3, 1976	Houston	W 126–101				MECCA Arena	15–18
34	January 6, 1976	Atlanta	L 87–91				MECCA Arena	15–19

February: 0–0 (home: 0–0; road: 0–0)

Game	Date	Team	Score	High points	High rebounds	High assists	Location Attendance	Record

March: 0–0 (home: 0–0; road: 0–0)

Game	Date	Team	Score	High points	High rebounds	High assists	Location Attendance	Record

April: 0–0 (home: 0–0; road: 0–0)

Game	Date	Team	Score	High points	High rebounds	High assists	Location Attendance	Record

1975–76 schedule

== Playoffs ==
1976 playoff game log
First Round: 1–2 (home: 1–1; road: 0–1)

Game	Date	Team	Score	High points	High rebounds	High assists	Location Attendance	Series
1	April 13	Detroit	W 110–107	Gary Brokaw (36)	Elmore Smith (13)	Brian Winters (7)	MECCA Arena; 8,912	1–0
2	April 16	@ Detroit	L 123–126	Winters, Dandridge (31)	Bob Dandridge (9)	Gary Brokaw (12)	Cobo Arena; 8,330	1–1
3	April 18	Detroit	L 104–107	Brian Winters (33)	Dave Meyers (10)	Gary Brokaw (7)	MECCA Arena; 8,213	1–2

1976 schedule

== Player statistics ==
Legend
GP	Games played	GS	Games started	MPG	Minutes per game
FG%	Field-goal percentage	3P%	3-point field-goal percentage	FT%	Free-throw percentage
RPG	Rebounds per game	APG	Assists per game	SPG	Steals per game
BPG	Blocks per game	PPG	Points per game

=== Season ===
Season
Player	GP	GS	MPG	FG%	3FG%	FT%	RPG	APG	SPG	BPG	PPG
Bob Dandridge	73		37.5	50.2		82.4	7.4	2.8	1.5	0.5	21.5
Brian Winters	78		35.8	46.4		82.9	3.2	4.7	1.6	0.3	18.2
Elmore Smith	78		36.0	51.8		63.2	11.4	1.2	1.0	3.1	15.6
Jim Price	80		31.6	41.5		84.9	3.3	4.9	1.9	0.4	11.7
Junior Bridgeman	81		20.3	43.9		79.5	3.6	1.9	0.6	0.3	8.6
Gary Brokaw	75		19.6	45.7		70.0	1.7	3.3	0.5	0.2	8.4
Dave Meyers	72		22.1	41.9		64.3	6.2	1.4	1.0	0.3	7.4
Kevin Restani	82		20.1	47.5		57.1	4.6	1.2	0.4	0.1	6.0
Clyde Mayes	65		14.6	46.0		57.7	4.0	0.6	0.1	0.6	4.4
Jon McGlocklin	33		10.2	42.6		90.0	0.5	1.2	0.2	0.0	4.1
Jim Fox	70		13.1	51.7		78.5	3.4	0.6	0.4	0.2	3.9
Mickey Davis	45		9.1	36.2		79.4	1.9	0.8	0.3	0.0	3.6

=== Playoffs ===
Playoffs
Player	GP	GS	MPG	FG%	3FG%	FT%	RPG	APG	SPG	BPG	PPG
Brian Winters	3		42.0	62.9		80.0	2.3	5.0	1.7	0.7	27.3
Bob Dandridge	3		40.7	49.0		90.0	7.7	2.7	1.0	0.0	22.0
Gary Brokaw	3		36.0	62.2		94.4	3.7	8.0	1.0	1.0	21.0
Elmore Smith	3		34.7	55.6		66.7	7.3	0.3	0.7	3.7	14.7
Jim Price	1		19.0	37.5		57.1	0.0	4.0	1.0	0.0	10.0
Junior Bridgeman	3		22.3	45.0		63.6	3.7	1.7	0.3	0.0	8.3
Dave Meyers	3		18.0	45.5		82.4	4.7	0.7	0.3	0.0	8.0
Jim Fox	3		11.0	80.0		100.0	2.3	1.0	0.0	0.3	3.3
Jon McGlocklin	2		6.5	75.0		0.0	0.5	0.5	0.5	0.0	3.0
Clyde Mayes	3		13.7	20.0		75.0	2.0	0.3	0.3	0.3	1.7
Kevin Restani	3		11.0	20.0		0.0	1.7	0.3	0.3	0.0	0.7

== Transactions ==
=== Trades ===
June 16, 1975
October 22, 1975
To Milwaukee Bucks----
- Junior Bridgeman
- Dave Meyers
- Elmore Smith
- Brian Winters
To Milwaukee Bucks----
- Jim Fox
To Los Angeles Lakers----
- Kareem Abdul-Jabbar
- Walt Wesley
To Seattle SuperSonics----
- 1976 2nd round pick (Bayard Forrest)
