= 1975–76 Golden State Warriors season =

NBA professional basketball team season

- Division champions
- Head coach: Al Attles
- General manager: Dick Vertlieb
- Owner: Franklin Mieuli
- Arena: Oakland Coliseum Arena

Results
- Record: 59–23 (.720)
- Place: Division: 1st (Pacific); Conference: 1st (Western)
- Playoff finish: Conference finals (lost to Suns 3–4)
- Stats at Basketball Reference

Local media
- Television: KTVU
- Radio: KNBR

The 1975–76 Golden State Warriors season was the 31st season of NBA basketball in Oakland, California Coming off their NBA Championship, the Warriors finished with a then-franchise-best 59–23 record. The Warriors would however lose in the Western Conference finals to the upstart Phoenix Suns, four games to three. The Warriors’ franchise-best regular-season record would be surpassed when the team won the 2014–15 championship, but in between the Warriors would play thirty-eight seasons without even reaching the conference finals, the fourth-longest such drought in NBA history.

== Offseason ==
=== Draft picks ===
Round	Pick	Player	Position	Nationality	College
1	14	Joe Bryant	F	United States	La Salle
2	20	Gus Williams	G	United States	USC
3	40	Otis Johnson	F	United States	Stetson
3	51	Robert Hawkins	G	United States	Illinois State
4	69	Billy Taylor	F	United States	La Salle
5	87	Larry Pounds		United States	Washington
6	105	Tony Styles		United States	San Francisco
7	123	Stan Boyer	F	United States	Wyoming
8	141	Mike Rozenski		United States	St. Mary's (CA)
9	157	Scott Trobbe		United States	Stanford
10	171	Maurice Harper		United States	St. Mary's (CA)

== Roster ==
1975–76 Golden State Warriors roster
Players

Pos.	No.	Player	Height	Weight	DOB	From
SF	24	Rick Barry	6 ft 7 in (2.01 m)	205 lb (93 kg)	1944-03-28	Miami (FL)
PF	42	Dwight Davis	6 ft 8 in (2.03 m)	220 lb (100 kg)	1949-10-28	Houston
PF	40	Derrek Dickey	6 ft 7 in (2.01 m)	218 lb (99 kg)	1951-03-20	Cincinnati
PG	15	Charles Dudley	6 ft 2 in (1.88 m)	180 lb (82 kg)	1950-03-05	Washington
SG	12	Robert Hawkins	6 ft 4 in (1.93 m)	190 lb (86 kg)	1954-06-30	Illinois State
PG	10	Charles Johnson	6 ft 0 in (1.83 m)	170 lb (77 kg)	1949-03-31	California
C	52	George Johnson	6 ft 11 in (2.11 m)	205 lb (93 kg)	1948-12-18	Dillard
SG	23	Jeff Mullins	6 ft 4 in (1.93 m)	190 lb (86 kg)	1942-03-18	Duke
C	44	Clifford Ray	6 ft 9 in (2.06 m)	230 lb (104 kg)	1949-01-21	Oklahoma
SG	20	Phil Smith	6 ft 4 in (1.93 m)	185 lb (84 kg)	1952-04-22	San Francisco
SF	41	Jamaal Wilkes	6 ft 6 in (1.98 m)	190 lb (86 kg)	1953-05-02	UCLA
PG	1	Gus Williams	6 ft 2 in (1.88 m)	175 lb (79 kg)	1953-10-10	USC

Coaches
Head coach
- Al Attles
Assistant(s)
- Joe Roberts

Legend
- (DP) Unsigned draft pick
- (FA) Free agent
- (S) Suspended
- Injured

Roster
Updated: October 23, 1975

== Regular season ==
=== Season standings ===
Pacific Division	W	L	PCT	GB	Home	Road	Div
y-Golden State Warriors	59	23	.720	–	36–5	23–18	17–9
x-Seattle SuperSonics	43	39	.524	16	31–10	12–29	12–14
x-Phoenix Suns	42	40	.512	17	27–14	15–26	15–11
Los Angeles Lakers	40	42	.488	19	31–11	9–31	10–16
Portland Trail Blazers	37	45	.451	22	25–15	12–30	11–15

#	Western Conference				
#	Team	W	L	PCT	GB
1	z-Golden State Warriors	59	23	.720	–
2	x-Seattle SuperSonics	43	39	.524	16
3	x-Phoenix Suns	42	40	.512	17
4	y-Milwaukee Bucks	38	44	.463	21
5	x-Detroit Pistons	36	46	.439	23
6	Los Angeles Lakers	40	42	.488	19
7	Portland Trail Blazers	37	45	.451	22
8	Kansas City Kings	31	51	.378	28
9	Chicago Bulls	24	58	.293	35

== Playoffs ==
In the playoffs, the Warriors returned to the Western Conference finals by beating the Detroit Pistons in 6 games. In the Western Finals, the Warriors faced the Phoenix Suns. The Warriors had a 2 games to 1 lead. Game 4 went in overtime and the Warriors were unable to grab a 3–1 series lead. The Suns would rally to win the game 133–129. The Warriors would bounce back to take Game 5, but the Suns would win Games 6 & 7 to stun the defending Champions.

1976 playoff game log
Conference semifinals: 4–2 (home: 2–1; road: 2–1)

Game	Date	Team	Score	High points	High rebounds	High assists	Location Attendance	Series
1	April 20	Detroit	W 127–103	Phil Smith (26)	Clifford Ray (12)	Rick Barry (14)	Oakland–Alameda County Coliseum Arena; 13,067	1–0
2	April 22	Detroit	L 111–123	Rick Barry (27)	Clifford Ray (12)	Rick Barry (8)	Oakland–Alameda County Coliseum Arena; 13,067	1–1
3	April 24	@ Detroit	W 113–96	Phil Smith (34)	Jamaal Wilkes (18)	Rick Barry (10)	Cobo Arena; 10,022	2–1
4	April 26	@ Detroit	L 102–106	Phil Smith (31)	Clifford Ray (8)	Rick Barry (6)	Cobo Arena; 11,389	2–2
5	April 28	Detroit	W 128–109	Phil Smith (28)	Clifford Ray (14)	Rick Barry (11)	Oakland–Alameda County Coliseum Arena; 13,067	3–2
6	April 30	@ Detroit	W 118–116 (OT)	Phil Smith (37)	three players tied (8)	Phil Smith (7)	Cobo Arena; 10,361	4–2

Conference finals: 3–4 (home: 2–2; road: 1–2)

Game	Date	Team	Score	High points	High rebounds	High assists	Location Attendance	Series
1	May 2	Phoenix	W 128–103	Rick Barry (38)	Clifford Ray (11)	Gus Williams (6)	Oakland–Alameda County Coliseum Arena; 12,475	1–0
2	May 5	Phoenix	L 101–108	Rick Barry (44)	George Johnson (11)	Rick Barry (4)	Oakland–Alameda County Coliseum Arena; 13,067	1–1
3	May 7	@ Phoenix	W 99–91	Jamaal Wilkes (22)	Rick Barry (7)	Barry, Smith (6)	Arizona Veterans Memorial Coliseum; 13,306	2–1
4	May 9	@ Phoenix	L 129–133 (2OT)	Phil Smith (30)	Jamaal Wilkes (14)	Phil Smith (8)	Arizona Veterans Memorial Coliseum; 12,884	2–2
5	May 12	Phoenix	W 111–95	Phil Smith (25)	Clifford Ray (16)	Phil Smith (6)	Oakland–Alameda County Coliseum Arena; 13,067	3–2
6	May 14	@ Phoenix	L 104–105	Rick Barry (30)	Clifford Ray (12)	Barry, Smith (6)	Arizona Veterans Memorial Coliseum; 13,396	3–3
7	May 16	Phoenix	L 86–94	Rick Barry (20)	Wilkes, Ray (13)	Phil Smith (6)	Oakland–Alameda County Coliseum Arena; 13,067	3–4

1976 schedule

== Awards and honors ==
- Rick Barry, All-NBA First Team
- Rick Barry, NBA All-Star Game
- Phil Smith, All-NBA Second Team
- Phil Smith, NBA All-Defensive Second Team
- Gus Williams, NBA All-Rookie Team First Team
