= 1975–76 Portland Trail Blazers season =

NBA professional basketball team season

- Head coach: Lenny Wilkens
- General manager: Harry Glickman
- Owner: Larry Weinberg
- Arena: Memorial Coliseum

Results
- Record: 37–45 (.451)
- Place: Division: 5th (Pacific); Conference: 7th (Western)
- Playoff finish: Did not qualify
- Stats at Basketball Reference

Local media
- Television: KOIN
- Radio: KOIN

The 1975–76 Portland Trail Blazers season was the sixth season of the Portland Trail Blazers in the National Basketball Association (NBA). The Blazers finished at 37–45, one game shy of their franchise high from the previous year. Despite finishing with a better record than the Detroit Pistons of the Midwest Division, the Pistons made the playoffs and the Blazers did not.

== Draft picks ==
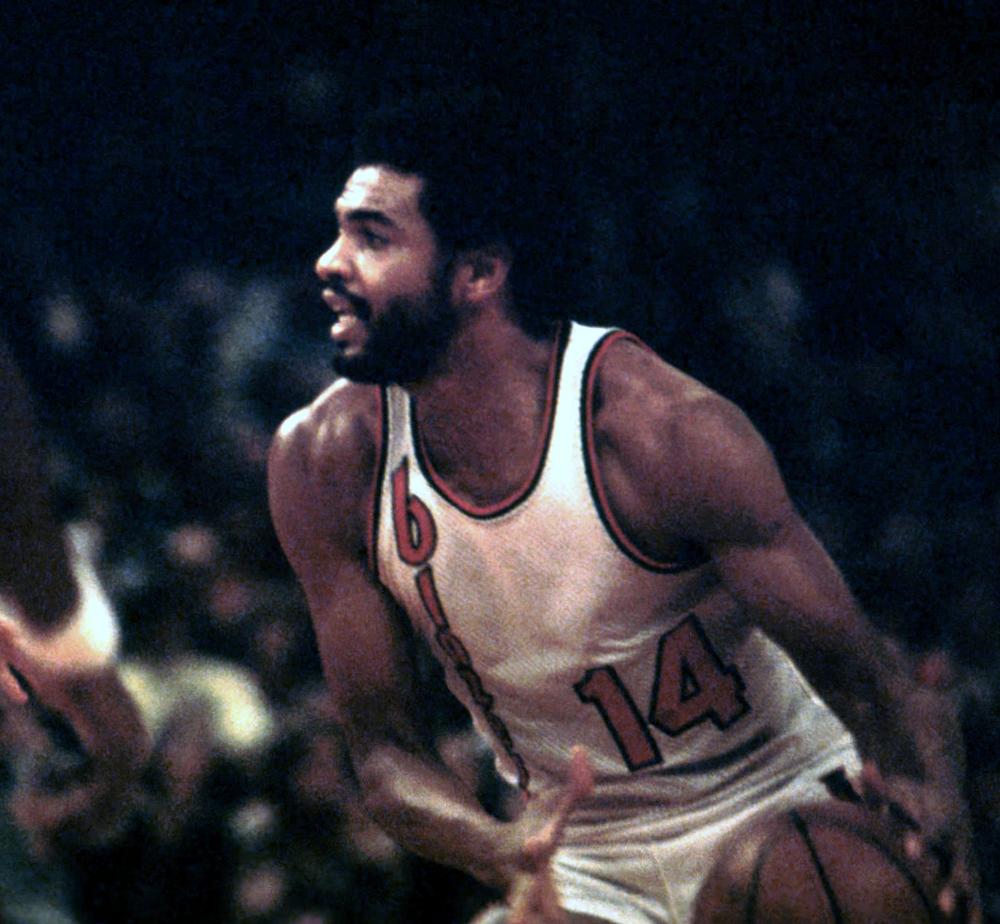
Lionel Hollins was the sixth pick overall in the 1975 NBA draft.

Note: This is not a complete list; only the first two rounds are covered, as well as any other picks by the franchise who played at least one NBA game.

Round	Pick	Player	Position	Nationality	School/Club team
1	6	Lionel Hollins	G	United States	Arizona State
2	25	Bob Gross	G/F	United States	Long Beach State
3	50	Gus Gerard	G/F	United States	Spirits of St. Louis (ABA)
4	61	Phil Hicks	F	United States	Tulane

== Roster ==
1975–76 Portland Trail Blazers roster
Players

Pos.	No.	Player	Height	Weight	DOB	From
G	33	Dan Anderson	6 ft 2 in (1.88 m)	185 lb (84 kg)		USC
F	40	Barry Clemens	6 ft 6 in (1.98 m)	210 lb (95 kg)		Ohio Wesleyan
SF	30	Bob Gross	6 ft 6 in (1.98 m)	200 lb (91 kg)		Long Beach State
C	10	Steve Hawes	6 ft 9 in (2.06 m)	220 lb (100 kg)		Washington
G	14	Lionel Hollins	6 ft 3 in (1.91 m)	185 lb (84 kg)		Arizona State
G	23	Steve "Snapper" Jones	6 ft 5 in (1.96 m)	205 lb (93 kg)		Oregon
C	25	LaRue Martin	6 ft 11 in (2.11 m)	208 lb (94 kg)		Loyola Chicago
F	36	Lloyd Neal	6 ft 7 in (2.01 m)	225 lb (102 kg)		Tennessee State
SG	45	Geoff Petrie	6 ft 4 in (1.93 m)	190 lb (86 kg)		Princeton
F	15	Larry Steele	6 ft 5 in (1.96 m)	180 lb (82 kg)		Kentucky
C	32	Bill Walton	6 ft 11 in (2.11 m)	210 lb (95 kg)		UCLA
PF	21	Sidney Wicks	6 ft 8 in (2.03 m)	225 lb (102 kg)		UCLA

Coaches
Head coach
- Lenny Wilkens
Assistant(s)
- Tom Meschery

Legend
- (DP) Unsigned draft pick
- (FA) Free agent
- (S) Suspended
- Injured

== Regular season ==
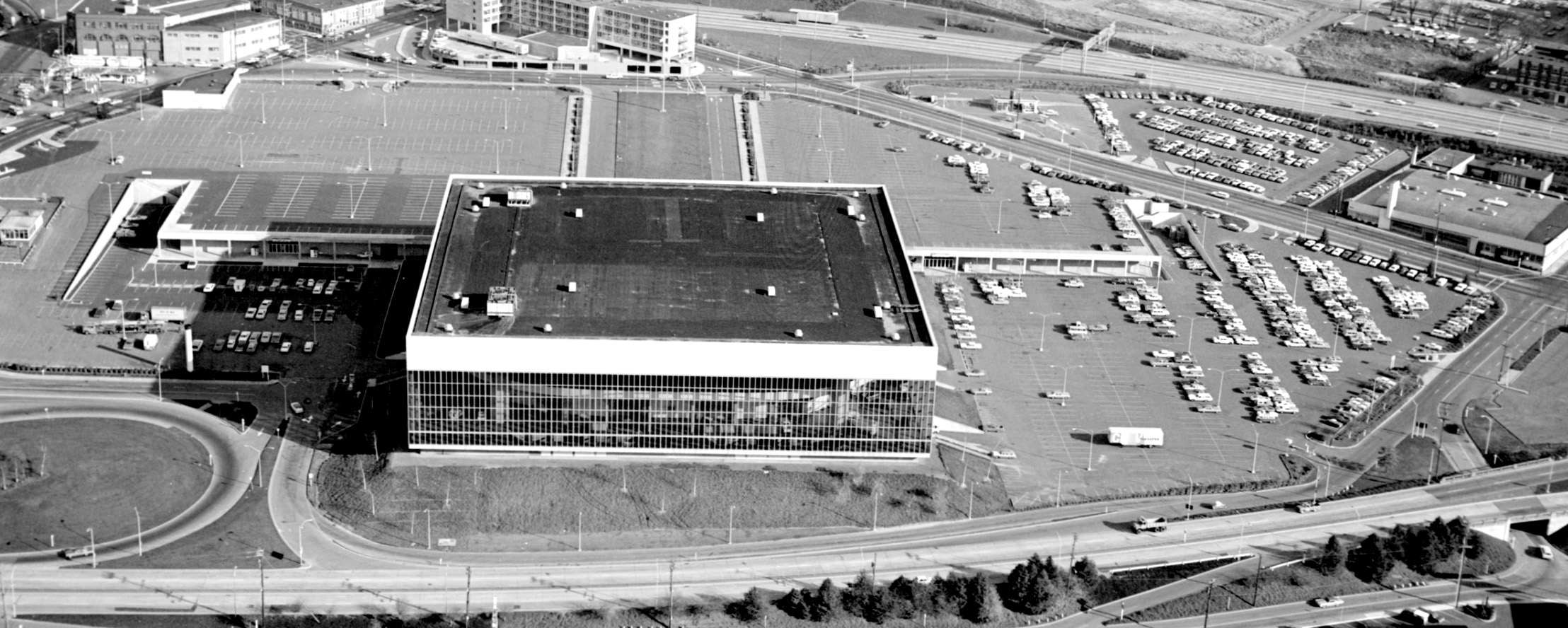
The Trail Blazers played their home games at Veterans Memorial Coliseum.

=== October ===
Three of the first four games of the 1975–76 season for the Trail Blazers were played on the road. It proved to be a stiff opening test for the team, as they lost all three road games handily, and narrowly missed beating the Phoenix Suns in the lone home game of the opening month.

The opening game of the season was a visit to Seattle to face the SuperSonics on October 24. The Blazers started out well, leading 28–24 after the first quarter. However, by halftime Seattle was leading 57–53. The Blazers came back and made it a one-point game by the start of the fourth quarter, but Seattle pulled away, winning the fourth quarter by a 27–20 margin, and thus the game, 105–97. Geoff Petrie led the Blazers with 25 points, and Sidney Wicks added 20. Lloyd Neal fouled out after amassing 6 fouls to go along with 15 points. The Blazers' record: 0–1. For the SuperSonics, the leaders were Fred Brown with 29 points, and Slick Watts with 17. The game was played in front of a crowd of 13,601.

Portland were home the following evening to face the Phoenix Suns, on October 25. The Blazers blew an 11-point lead they had amassed after the first three-quarters, as the Suns dominated the final quarter, 26–12, to take the game by a final score of 89–88. It was a tough way to start the home portion of the season's schedule, and it would take a little more 'killer instinct' if they wanted to finish off teams and progress in the direction towards success. Bill Walton led the Blazers with 33 points, and Sidney Wicks chipped in 21. The Suns were guided by Paul Westphal's 17 points, while Nate Hawthorne and Alvin Adams contributed 14. Mike Bantom fouled out for Phoenix after failing to sink a single basket. This contest was played in front of a crowd of 11,274 incredibly disappointed partisans. The Blazers dropped to 0–2, while the Suns went to 1–0.

=== Season standings ===
Pacific Division	W	L	PCT	GB	Home	Road	Div
y-Golden State Warriors	59	23	.720	–	36–5	23–18	17–9
x-Seattle SuperSonics	43	39	.524	16	31–10	12–29	12–14
x-Phoenix Suns	42	40	.512	17	27–14	15–26	15–11
Los Angeles Lakers	40	42	.488	19	31–11	9–31	10–16
Portland Trail Blazers	37	45	.451	22	25–15	12–30	11–15

#	Western Conference				
#	Team	W	L	PCT	GB
1	z-Golden State Warriors	59	23	.720	–
2	x-Seattle SuperSonics	43	39	.524	16
3	x-Phoenix Suns	42	40	.512	17
4	y-Milwaukee Bucks	38	44	.463	21
5	x-Detroit Pistons	36	46	.439	23
6	Los Angeles Lakers	40	42	.488	19
7	Portland Trail Blazers	37	45	.451	22
8	Kansas City Kings	31	51	.378	28
9	Chicago Bulls	24	58	.293	35

z – clinched division title
y – clinched division title
x – clinched playoff spot

== Awards and honors ==
- Lionel Hollins, NBA All-Rookie Team 1st Team
