= 1975–76 Kansas City Kings season =

NBA professional basketball team season

- Head coach: Phil Johnson
- Owners: Leon Karosen; Robert Margolin; H. Paul Rosenberg
- Arena: Kemper Arena; Omaha Civic Auditorium

Results
- Record: 31–51 (.378)
- Place: Division: 3rd (Midwest); Conference: 8th (Western)
- Playoff finish: Did not qualify
- Stats at Basketball Reference

Local media
- Television: KBMA-TV
- Radio: KCMO

The 1975–76 Kansas City Kings season was the Kings 27th season in the NBA and their fourth season in the city of Kansas City, as well as their first season without the inclusion of Omaha involved. Although the team dropped the "-Omaha" part of their original Kings team name, the Kings would still play six games out in Omaha, as well as play games there on certain occasions until 1978.

== Roster ==
1975–76 Kansas City Kings roster
Players

Pos.	No.	Player	Height	Weight	DOB	From
PG	1	Nate Archibald	6 ft 1 in (1.85 m)	165 lb (75 kg)	1948-09-02	UTEP
SF	11	Bob Bigelow	6 ft 2 in (1.88 m)	215 lb (98 kg)	1953-12-26	Penn
SG	35	Glenn Hansen	6 ft 4 in (1.93 m)	205 lb (93 kg)	1952-04-21	LSU
SF	33	Ollie Johnson	6 ft 6 in (1.98 m)	200 lb (91 kg)	1949-05-11	Temple
C	55	Len Kosmalski	7 ft 0 in (2.13 m)	245 lb (111 kg)	1951-11-29	Tennessee
C	44	Sam Lacey	6 ft 10 in (2.08 m)	235 lb (107 kg)	1948-03-28	New Mexico State
PF	31	Larry McNeill	6 ft 9 in (2.06 m)	195 lb (88 kg)	1951-01-31	Marquette
PF	52	Bill Robinzine	6 ft 7 in (2.01 m)	230 lb (104 kg)	1947-07-07	DePaul
SG	24	Jimmy Walker	6 ft 3 in (1.91 m)	195 lb (88 kg)	1944-04-08	Providence
SF	15	Scott Wedman	6 ft 7 in (2.01 m)	215 lb (98 kg)	1952-07-29	Colorado
PG	3	Lee Winfield	6 ft 2 in (1.88 m)	174 lb (79 kg)	1947-02-04	North Texas

Coaches
Head coach
- Phil Johnson
Assistant(s)
- Dan Sparks

Legend
- (DP) Unsigned draft pick
- (FA) Free agent
- (S) Suspended
- Injured

== Regular season ==
=== Season standings ===
Midwest Division	W	L	PCT	GB	Home	Road	Div
y-Milwaukee Bucks	38	44	.463	–	22–19	16–25	13–8
x-Detroit Pistons	36	46	.439	2	24–17	12–29	12–9
Kansas City Kings	31	51	.378	7	25–16	6–35	10–11
Chicago Bulls	24	58	.293	14	15–26	9–32	7–14

#	Western Conference				
#	Team	W	L	PCT	GB
1	z-Golden State Warriors	59	23	.720	–
2	x-Seattle SuperSonics	43	39	.524	16
3	x-Phoenix Suns	42	40	.512	17
4	y-Milwaukee Bucks	38	44	.463	21
5	x-Detroit Pistons	36	46	.439	23
6	Los Angeles Lakers	40	42	.488	19
7	Portland Trail Blazers	37	45	.451	22
8	Kansas City Kings	31	51	.378	28
9	Chicago Bulls	24	58	.293	35

z – clinched division title
y – clinched division title
x – clinched playoff spot

== Awards and records ==
- Nate Archibald, All-NBA First Team
