= Lindsay Hairston =

American basketball player (born 1951)

Personal information
- Born: December 8, 1951 (age 74) Detroit, Michigan, U.S.
- Listed height: 6 ft 7 in (2.01 m)
- Listed weight: 180 lb (82 kg)

Career information
- High school: Kettering (Detroit, Michigan)
- College: Michigan State (1972–1975)
- NBA draft: 1975: 4th round, 64th overall pick
- Drafted by: Detroit Pistons
- Position: Small forward
- Number: 45

Career history
- 1975–1976: Detroit Pistons

Career highlights
- Fourth-team Parade All-American (1971)
- Stats at NBA.com
- Stats at Basketball Reference

Lindsay Hairston (born December 8, 1951) is an American former professional basketball player who spent one season in the National Basketball Association (NBA) as a member of the Detroit Pistons during the 1975–76 season.

Born in Detroit, Michigan, Hairston played high school basketball at Kettering High School in Detroit before playing collegiately for Michigan State, averaging 19.3 ppg and 11.5 rpg in his senior season (1974–75), and was twice named first-team All-Big Ten.

Controversially, Hairston was one of a number of black players who walked out on Michigan State coach Gus Ganakas before a key Big Ten game on January 4, 1975, against Indiana. Ganakas elected to start Jeff Tropf, who was white, 10 black players, led by team captain Hairston, walked out of the team meeting, returned for the game but were then suspended by Ganakas. Michigan State lost the game 107–55 with a patchwork roster that included junior varsity players. Tropf led the team with 21 points. The players would meet with Ganakas the next day, aired a number of grievance, were reinstated after apologizing, and then defeated Ohio State 88–84 the next day. Tropf would transfer to Central Michigan at the end of the season.

Hairston was selected by the Pistons during the fourth round (64^{th} pick overall) of the 1975 NBA draft, spending one season with the hometown NBA team, averaging 5.8 ppg in the 1975-76 Detroit Pistons season. He went on to play in France for several years, winning the FIBA Korać Cup in 1984 as a member of the team of Élan Béarnais Pau-Orthez.

== Career statistics ==
Legend
GP	Games played	GS	Games started	MPG	Minutes per game
FG%	Field goal percentage	3P%	3-point field goal percentage	FT%	Free throw percentage
RPG	Rebounds per game	APG	Assists per game	SPG	Steals per game
BPG	Blocks per game	PPG	Points per game	**Bold**	Career high

=== NBA ===
==== Regular season ====
Year	Team	GP	MPG	FG%	FT%	RPG	APG	SPG	BPG	PPG
1975–76	Detroit	47	13.9	.456	.580	3.8	.4	.4	.7	5.8
