= 1975–76 Chicago Bulls season =

NBA professional basketball team season

- Head coach: Dick Motta
- General manager: Dick Motta
- Owner(s): Arthur Wirtz and Jonathan Kovler
- Arena: Chicago Stadium

Results
- Record: 24–58 (.293)
- Place: Division: 4th (Midwest); Conference: 9th (Western)
- Playoff finish: Did not qualify
- Stats at Basketball Reference

Local media
- Television: WSNS-TV (Andy Musser, Lorn Brown)
- Radio: WIND (Jim Durham, Bill Berg)

The 1975–76 Chicago Bulls season was the Bulls' tenth season in the NBA.

== Roster ==
1975–76 Chicago Bulls roster
Players

Pos.	No.	Player	Height	Weight	DOB	From
G	5	Leon Benbow	6 ft 4 in (1.93 m)	185 lb (84 kg)	1950–07–23	Jacksonville
F	35	John Block	6 ft 9 in (2.06 m)	207 lb (94 kg)	1944–04–16	USC
C	18	Tom Boerwinkle	7 ft 0 in (2.13 m)	265 lb (120 kg)	1945–08–23	Tennessee
F/C	41	Eric Fernsten	6 ft 10 in (2.08 m)	205 lb (93 kg)	1953–11–01	San Francisco
F	8	Mickey Johnson	6 ft 10 in (2.08 m)	190 lb (86 kg)	1952–08–31	Aurora
G	20	John Laskowski	6 ft 6 in (1.98 m)	185 lb (84 kg)	1953–06–07	Indiana
F	10	Bob Love	6 ft 8 in (2.03 m)	215 lb (98 kg)	1942–12–08	Southern
F	24	Jack Marin	6 ft 6 in (1.98 m)	210 lb (95 kg)	1944–10–12	Duke
C	32	Steve Patterson	6 ft 9 in (2.06 m)	225 lb (102 kg)	1948–06–24	UCLA
G/F	4	Jerry Sloan (injured)	6 ft 5 in (1.96 m)	195 lb (88 kg)	1942–03–28	Evansville
G	2	Norm Van Lier	6 ft 1 in (1.85 m)	173 lb (78 kg)	1947–04–01	Saint Francis (PA)
G	34	Bobby Wilson	6 ft 3 in (1.91 m)	175 lb (79 kg)	1951–01–15	Wichita State

Coaches
Head coach
- Dick Motta
Assistant(s)
- Ed Badger

Legend
- (DP) Unsigned draft pick
- (FA) Free agent
- (S) Suspended
- Injured

Roster
Updated: December 8, 1975

== Regular season ==
=== Season standings ===
Midwest Division	W	L	PCT	GB	Home	Road	Div
y-Milwaukee Bucks	38	44	.463	–	22–19	16–25	13–8
x-Detroit Pistons	36	46	.439	2	24–17	12–29	12–9
Kansas City Kings	31	51	.378	7	25–16	6–35	10–11
Chicago Bulls	24	58	.293	14	15–26	9–32	7–14

#	Western Conference				
#	Team	W	L	PCT	GB
1	z-Golden State Warriors	59	23	.720	–
2	x-Seattle SuperSonics	43	39	.524	16
3	x-Phoenix Suns	42	40	.512	17
4	y-Milwaukee Bucks	38	44	.463	21
5	x-Detroit Pistons	36	46	.439	23
6	Los Angeles Lakers	40	42	.488	19
7	Portland Trail Blazers	37	45	.451	22
8	Kansas City Kings	31	51	.378	28
9	Chicago Bulls	24	58	.293	35

z – clinched division title
y – clinched division title
x – clinched playoff spot

=== Game log ===
1975–76 game log
Total: 24–58 (home: 15–26; road: 9–33)
October: 0–0 (home: 0–0; road: 0–0)

Game	Date	Team	Score	High points	High rebounds	High assists	Location Attendance	Record

November : 0–0 (home: 0–0; road: 0–0)

Game	Date	Team	Score	High points	High rebounds	High assists	Location Attendance	Record

December : 0–0 (home: 0–0; road: 0–0)

Game	Date	Team	Score	High points	High rebounds	High assists	Location Attendance	Record

January : 0–0 (home: 0–0; road: 0–0)

Game	Date	Team	Score	High points	High rebounds	High assists	Location Attendance	Record

February : 0–0 (home: 0–0; road: 0–0)

Game	Date	Team	Score	High points	High rebounds	High assists	Location Attendance	Record

March : 0–0 (home: 0–0; road: 0–0)

Game	Date	Team	Score	High points	High rebounds	High assists	Location Attendance	Record

April : 0–0 (home: 0–0; road: 0–0)

Game	Date	Team	Score	High points	High rebounds	High assists	Location Attendance	Record

1975–76 schedule

== Player statistics ==
Legend
GP	Games played	GS	Games started	MPG	Minutes per game
FG%	Field-goal percentage	3P%	3-point field-goal percentage	FT%	Free-throw percentage
RPG	Rebounds per game	APG	Assists per game	SPG	Steals per game
BPG	Blocks per game	PPG	Points per game

Player	GP	GS	MPG	FG%	3P%	FT%	RPG	APG	SPG	BPG	PPG

== Awards and records ==
- Norm Van Lier, NBA All-Defensive First Team
- Norm Van Lier, NBA All-Star Game
