= Phil Smith (basketball) =

American basketball player (1952–2002)

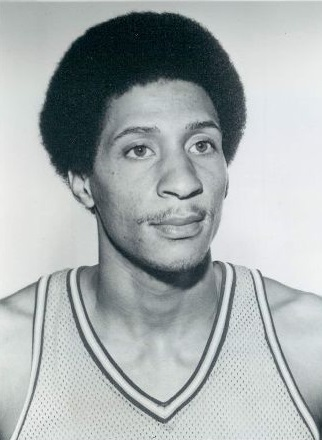
- Smith in 1975

Personal information
- Born: April 22, 1952 San Francisco, California, U.S.
- Died: July 29, 2002 (aged 50) Escondido, California, U.S.
- Listed height: 6 ft 4 in (1.93 m)
- Listed weight: 185 lb (84 kg)

Career information
- High school: George Washington (San Francisco, California)
- College: San Francisco (1971–1974)
- NBA draft: 1974: 2nd round, 29th overall pick
- Drafted by: Golden State Warriors
- Playing career: 1974–1983
- Position: Shooting guard
- Number: 20, 11

Career history
- 1974–1980: Golden State Warriors
- 1980–1982: San Diego Clippers
- 1982–1983: Seattle SuperSonics

Career highlights
- NBA champion (1975); 2× NBA All-Star (1976, 1977); All-NBA Second Team (1976); NBA All-Defensive Second Team (1976); No. 20 retired by San Francisco Dons

Career NBA statistics
- Points: 9,924 (15.1 ppg)
- Rebounds: 1,978 (3.0 rpg)
- Assists: 2,561 (3.9 apg)
- Stats at NBA.com
- Stats at Basketball Reference

Philip Arnold Smith (April 22, 1952 – July 29, 2002) was an American professional basketball player who played for nine seasons in the National Basketball Association (NBA) for various teams, including the Golden State Warriors, San Diego Clippers and Seattle SuperSonics. Smith played college basketball for the San Francisco Dons.

== Collegiate career ==
A 6'4" shooting guard from the University of San Francisco (USF), Smith was not heavily recruited out of George Washington High School. After graduating from high school a semester early, Smith followed his older brother and enrolled in night classes at USF. Having been seen playing in a pickup game on campus, he was recruited by coach Bob Gaillard, who enlisted him on the freshman squad (the NCAA did not allow freshmen to play on varsity at this time) where he averaged 16.7 ppg. He went on to lead the team in scoring in each of his three varsity seasons, 15.0, 18.7, and 20.7 ppg, for a career average of 18.1 ppg and was an all-West Coast Conference selection all three years. The Dons made appearances in the 1972 NCAA Men's Division I Basketball Tournament placing 4th in the Western Regional after losing to Weber State, and finished in the elite eight in the 1973 NCAA Men's Division I Basketball Tournament and 1974 NCAA Men's Division I Basketball Tournament, where they lost both times to UCLA under John Wooden. As a result, he was drafted #1 in the 1973 ABA draft by the Virginia Squires, but declined leaving college early. He was named to the All-American team his senior year. Scoring 1,523 career points, he excelled at USF becoming the ninth-leading scorer in school history. On February 17, 2001, his number 20 was retired at halftime during a home game against the University of San Diego. He is one of only five players to have their number retired by USF. He was named one of the Top-50 WCC athletes of all time in 2001.

== Professional career ==
After his senior year, Smith was selected by the Golden State Warriors with the 11th pick in the 2nd round of the 1974 National Basketball Association (NBA) draft (29th overall), spending six seasons with them. As a rookie during the 1975 season, he averaged 7.7 points on 48 percent shooting in 74 games and was a member of the Golden State Warriors' first NBA championship team. The following year, he stepped into the starting lineup and averaged a career-best 20.0 points while playing in all 82 games. Smith was a two-time NBA All-Star (1976 and 1977), an All-NBA second-team selection in 1976 and a 1976 All-NBA defensive second-team selection. He played for 9 seasons (1974–1983) in the National Basketball Association (NBA), for the Warriors, the San Diego Clippers, and the Seattle SuperSonics. Smith finished his NBA career with 9,924 total points and a 15.1 ppg career average. A ruptured Achilles tendon prior to the start of the 1979–80 campaign caused the decline of his career.

== Personal life ==
Was the third of nine children born to Ben and Thelma Smith of San Francisco. He is survived by his wife of 27 years, Angela, and their five children: Alicia, Philip, Amber, Martin and Peter, and 11 grandchildren. Martin played collegiately for the California Golden Bears from 2002 to 2006; Peter played for his parents' alma mater, the University of San Francisco before transferring to Concordia University (class of 2012).

September 27 is Phil Smith Day in San Francisco, California as decreed by former Mayor Willie Brown.

A scholarship endowment in Smith's name and the name of Arthur Zief Jr. was established at the University of San Francisco by Art Zief.

=== Death ===
Philip Smith died at Palomar Medical Center in Escondido, California from complications with multiple myeloma cancer, after a five-year battle with the disease. He was 50.

== NBA career statistics ==
Legend
GP	Games played	GS	Games started	MPG	Minutes per game
FG%	Field goal percentage	3P%	3-point field goal percentage	FT%	Free throw percentage
RPG	Rebounds per game	APG	Assists per game	SPG	Steals per game
BPG	Blocks per game	PPG	Points per game	**Bold**	Career high
†	Won an NBA championship

=== Regular season ===
Year	Team	GP	GS	MPG	FG%	3P%	FT%	RPG	APG	SPG	BPG	PPG
1974–75†	Golden State	74	–	14.3	.476	–	.804	1.9	1.8	0.8	0.0	7.7
1975–76	Golden State	**82**	–	34.1	.477	–	.788	**4.6**	4.4	1.3	0.2	**20.0**
1976–77	Golden State	**82**	–	35.1	.479	–	.785	4.0	4.0	1.2	**0.4**	19.0
1977–78	Golden State	**82**	–	35.9	.472	–	**.812**	3.7	4.8	1.3	0.3	19.7
1978–79	Golden State	59	–	**38.8**	**.501**	–	.761	3.6	4.4	**1.7**	**0.4**	19.9
1979–80	Golden State	51	–	30.4	.474	.318	.789	2.9	3.7	1.2	0.3	15.5
1980–81	San Diego	76	–	31.3	.491	.222	.757	2.1	**4.9**	1.1	0.2	16.8
1981–82	San Diego	48	39	30.1	.440	.208	.732	2.4	**4.9**	0.9	**0.4**	13.2
1981–82	Seattle	26	2	22.9	.468	.000	.727	2.7	2.8	0.8	0.3	8.2
1982–83	Seattle	79	17	15.7	.438	**.375**	.759	1.6	2.7	0.6	0.1	5.7
Career		659	58	29.1	.476	.253	.779	3.0	3.9	1.1	0.3	15.1
All-Star		2	0	20.0	.450	–	.333	3.5	4.0	0.5	0.0	10.0

=== Playoffs ===
Year	Team	GP	GS	MPG	FG%	3P%	FT%	RPG	APG	SPG	BPG	PPG
1975†	Golden State	**16**	–	14.7	.375	–	.625	1.8	1.9	0.6	0.4	6.4
1976	Golden State	13	–	**37.9**	**.518**	–	.734	4.7	**4.6**	**1.6**	**0.5**	**24.0**
1977	Golden State	10	–	37.1	.402	–	**.800**	**5.0**	4.5	1.4	0.4	14.2
1982	Seattle	8	–	11.5	.400	.000	.333	1.0	0.9	0.6	0.1	3.1
1983	Seattle	2	–	9.5	.500	–	–	1.5	0.5	0.0	0.0	3.0
Career		49	–	24.7	.453	.000	.719	3.1	2.9	1.0	0.4	12.0
