= Brian Winters =

American basketball player and coach (born 1952)

Personal information
- Born: March 1, 1952 (age 74) Rockaway, New York, U.S.
- Listed height: 6 ft 4 in (1.93 m)
- Listed weight: 185 lb (84 kg)

Career information
- High school: Archbishop Molloy (Queens, New York)
- College: South Carolina (1971–1974)
- NBA draft: 1974: 1st round, 12th overall pick
- Drafted by: Los Angeles Lakers
- Playing career: 1974–1983
- Position: Shooting guard
- Number: 20, 32
- Coaching career: 1984–2013

Career history

Playing
- 1974–1975: Los Angeles Lakers
- 1975–1983: Milwaukee Bucks

Coaching
- 1984–1986: Princeton (assistant)
- 1986–1993: Cleveland Cavaliers (assistant)
- 1993–1995: Atlanta Hawks (assistant)
- 1995–1997: Vancouver Grizzlies
- 1997–1998: Denver Nuggets (assistant)
- 1999–2002: Golden State Warriors (assistant)
- 2001–2002: Golden State Warriors (interim)
- 2004–2007: Indiana Fever
- 2012–2013: Charlotte Bobcats (assistant)

Career highlights
- As player: 2× NBA All-Star (1976, 1978); NBA All-Rookie First Team (1975); No. 32 retired by Milwaukee Bucks

Career NBA playing statistics
- Points: 10,537 (16.2 ppg)
- Rebounds: 1,688 (2.6 rpg)
- Assists: 2,674 (4.1 apg)
- Stats at NBA.com
- Stats at Basketball Reference

Career coaching record
- NBA: 36–148 (.196)
- WNBA: 78–58 (.574)
- Record at Basketball Reference

Brian Joseph Winters (born March 1, 1952) is an American former basketball player and coach.

== Career ==
Winters attended academic and athletic powerhouse Archbishop Molloy High School in Queens, New York, graduating in 1970. He then played collegiately with the University of South Carolina, scoring 1,079 points over his career. While playing for South Carolina, Winters was hampered due to both a severe case of mononucleosis and a series of knee injuries. He was the 12th pick in the 1974 NBA draft, taken by the Los Angeles Lakers.

Winters made the NBA All-Rookie Team with the Lakers before he was traded to the Milwaukee Bucks as part of the deal that brought future Hall of Fame center Kareem Abdul-Jabbar to the West Coast, which Abdul-Jabbar had demanded. On April 18, 1976, in the first playoff series of his NBA career, Winters scored 33 points and recorded 5 assists in a 107–104 Game 3 loss against the Detroit Pistons. On November 30, 1976, Winters scored a career-high 43 points in a 115–106 victory over the Trailblazers. The following season, on December 16, 1977, Winters scored 24 points and made a game-winning jumpshot during a 152–150 triple overtime win against the New York Knicks. On March 19, 1978, Winters scored 22 points and recorded a career-high 18 assists in a 117–106 victory against the Washington Bullets.

Overall, he had a productive nine-year career that included two appearances in the NBA All-Star Game and six in the playoffs, and was a fan-favorite during the years that the Bucks struggled through immediately following the aforementioned Abdul-Jabbar trade. Winters averaged 16.2 points and 4.1 assists over his career, with his best years coming from 1975–76 to 1979–80, when he averaged 18.7 points. 4.7 assists and 1.4 steals per game. His game declined in the 1982–83 season, however, when he shot a career-worst 43 percent in the field, after which he retired at 31 years of age. The Bucks organization retired his number 32 on October 28, 1983, he was the third player in franchise history to be honored with a jersey retirement.

In a 2005 interview, Chicago Bulls superstar Michael Jordan singled out Winters as the best "pure shooter" in history, claiming that "he had the most beautiful stroke of all the people whom [he could] think of."

After retiring from the NBA, Winters became an assistant coach for two years under legendary coach Pete Carril at Princeton. From there, he moved on to become an assistant coach under Hall of Famer Lenny Wilkens with the Cleveland Cavaliers for 7 years and Atlanta Hawks for two more. Next he was the inaugural coach for the Vancouver Grizzlies for a year and a half. Later Winters coached with the Denver Nuggets and Golden State Warriors. He was formerly the head coach of the WNBA's Indiana Fever, leading them to their first ever consecutive-year playoff appearances.

On October 26, 2007, Winters option wasn't picked up by the Indiana Fever, ending his four-year tenure with the club. He compiled a 78–58 record in the regular season to go with a 5–7 playoff record. He was a scout for the Indiana Pacers for several seasons until he was let go during the NBA lockout in August 2011. He spent the 2012–13 season as an assistant coach with the Charlotte Bobcats.

Winters has been a talent scout for the Indiana Pacers since 2014. He played a role in convincing the Pacers to draft Myles Turner.

== Head coaching record ==
=== NBA ===
Legend
Regular season	G	Games coached	W	Games won	L	Games lost	W–L %	Win–loss %
Playoffs	PG	Playoff games	PW	Playoff wins	PL	Playoff losses	PW–L %	Playoff win–loss %

Team	Year	G	W	L	W–L%	Finish	PG	PW	PL	PW–L%	Result
Vancouver	1995–96	82	15	67	.183	7th in Midwest	—	—	—	—	Missed playoffs
Vancouver	1996–97	43	8	35	.186	(fired)	—	—	—	—	—
Golden State	2001–02	59	13	46	.220	7th in Pacific	—	—	—	—	Missed playoffs
Career		184	36	148	.196		—	—	—	—	

=== WNBA ===
Legend
Regular season	G	Games coached	W	Games won	L	Games lost	W–L %	Win–loss %
Playoffs	PG	Playoff games	PW	Playoff wins	PL	Playoff losses	PW–L %	Playoff win–loss %

Team	Year	G	W	L	W–L%	Finish	PG	PW	PL	PW–L%	Result
IND	2004	34	15	19	.441	6th in East	—	—	—	—	Missed Playoffs
IND	2005	34	21	13	.618	2nd in East	4	2	2	.500	Lost in Conference finals
IND	2006	34	21	13	.618	3rd in East	2	0	2	.000	Lost in Conference semifinals
IND	2007	34	21	13	.618	2nd in East	6	3	3	.500	Lost in Conference finals
Career		136	78	58	.574		12	5	7	.417	

== NBA career statistics ==
Legend
GP	Games played	GS	Games started	MPG	Minutes per game
FG%	Field goal percentage	3P%	3-point field goal percentage	FT%	Free throw percentage
RPG	Rebounds per game	APG	Assists per game	SPG	Steals per game
BPG	Blocks per game	PPG	Points per game	**Bold**	Career high

=== Regular season ===
Year	Team	GP	GS	MPG	FG%	3P%	FT%	RPG	APG	SPG	BPG	PPG
1974–75	L.A. Lakers	68	–	22.3	.443	–	.826	2.0	2.9	1.1	0.3	11.7
1975–76	Milwaukee	78	–	**35.8**	.464	–	.829	**3.2**	4.7	**1.6**	0.3	18.2
1976–77	Milwaukee	78	–	34.8	.498	–	.847	3.0	4.3	1.5	0.4	19.3
1977–78	Milwaukee	**80**	–	34.4	.463	–	.840	3.1	**4.9**	**1.6**	0.3	**19.9**
1978–79	Milwaukee	79	–	32.6	.493	–	.856	2.2	4.8	1.1	**0.5**	19.8
1979–80	Milwaukee	**80**	–	32.8	.479	.373	.860	2.8	4.5	1.3	0.4	16.2
1980–81	Milwaukee	69	–	25.7	.475	.353	**.869**	2.0	3.3	1.0	0.1	11.6
1981–82	Milwaukee	61	13	30.0	**.501**	**.387**	.788	2.8	4.1	0.9	0.1	15.9
1982–83	Milwaukee	57	12	23.9	.434	.324	.859	1.9	2.7	0.8	0.1	10.6
Career		650	25	30.7	.475	.363	.842	2.6	4.1	1.2	0.3	16.2
All-Star		2	1	15.0	.417	–	–	3.0	1.0	0.5	0.0	5.0

=== Playoffs ===
Year	Team	GP	GS	MPG	FG%	3P%	FT%	RPG	APG	SPG	BPG	PPG
1976	Milwaukee	3	–	**42.0**	**.629**	–	.800	2.3	5.0	**1.7**	0.7	**27.3**
1978	Milwaukee	**9**	–	33.9	.497	–	.741	**3.3**	**6.4**	1.3	**0.9**	20.4
1980	Milwaukee	7	–	38.3	.460	.429	**1.000**	3.0	5.3	1.6	0.0	15.9
1981	Milwaukee	7	–	25.9	.459	.333	.750	**3.3**	3.1	1.4	0.1	10.0
1982	Milwaukee	6	–	38.7	.494	**.500**	.833	2.5	4.7	1.3	0.2	16.8
1983	Milwaukee	**9**	–	26.7	.429	.273	.824	2.4	3.6	0.7	0.4	9.9
Career		41	–	33.0	.490	.396	.808	2.9	4.7	1.3	0.4	15.5
