= 1975–76 NBA season =

30th NBA season

- League: National Basketball Association
- Sport: Basketball
- Duration: October 23, 1975 – April 11, 1976; April 13 – May 18, 1976 (Playoffs); May 23 – June 6, 1976 (Finals)
- Games: 82
- Teams: 18
- TV partner: CBS

Draft
- Top draft pick: David Thompson
- Picked by: Atlanta Hawks

Regular season
- Top seed: Golden State Warriors
- Season MVP: Kareem Abdul-Jabbar (L.A. Lakers)
- Top scorer: Bob McAdoo (Buffalo)

Playoffs
- Eastern champions: Boston Celtics
- Eastern runners-up: Cleveland Cavaliers
- Western champions: Phoenix Suns
- Western runners-up: Golden State Warriors

Finals
- Champions: Boston Celtics
- Runners-up: Phoenix Suns
- Finals MVP: Jo Jo White (Boston)

NBA seasons
- ← 1974–75 1976–77 →

The 1975–76 NBA season was the 30th season of the National Basketball Association. The season ended with the Boston Celtics winning the NBA championship, beating the Phoenix Suns 4 games to 2 in the NBA Finals.

== Notable occurrences ==
- Larry O'Brien begins his tenure as the league's third commissioner.
- The jump ball to start the second, third and fourth quarters is eliminated. The winner of the opening jump ball receives possession at the beginning of the fourth, with the opposing team starting the middle periods with possession.
- The 1976 NBA All-Star Game was played at The Spectrum in Philadelphia, with the Eastern Conference beating the Western Conference 123–109. Dave Bing of the Washington Bullets wins the game's MVP award.
- The Kansas City-Omaha Kings are renamed the Kansas City Kings as they settle into a permanent home in Kansas City, Missouri.
- The New Orleans Jazz moved into the cavernous Louisiana Superdome after splitting their inaugural season between two inadequate facilities, the Loyola University Fieldhouse and New Orleans Municipal Auditorium.
- The Houston Rockets play their inaugural season in The Summit.
- It was the final season for Don Nelson, Pat Riley and Jerry Sloan as players. Each would go on to coach more than 2,000 games in the NBA.
- This was the final season before the NBA-ABA merger. In the 1976 offseason, four ABA teams joined the NBA: the Denver Nuggets, Indiana Pacers, San Antonio Spurs, and the reigning ABA champion New York Nets, who relocated to New Jersey.
- It was the first season for Darryl Dawkins, World B. Free, and Kobe Bryant's dad Joe Bryant.
- Dick Bavetta began his Hall of Fame officiating career, replacing the retired Mendy Rudolph, who suffered a blood clot in his lung during a 1975 playoff game and became an analyst for CBS Sports. Bavetta went on to set the record for most games officiated with 2,635 by the time he retired in 2014.
- Kareem Abdul-Jabbar was named the league's Most Valuable Player despite his team missing the playoffs. He remains the only league MVP to miss the playoffs.
- The NBA Finals were contested by the Boston Celtics and Phoenix Suns. Phoenix was making their first finals appearance; Boston was making their fourteenth.
- Game 4 of the NBA Finals was first game ever played in the month of June.
- Game 5 of the NBA Finals between the Celtics and the Suns went into triple-overtime before the Celtics prevailed 128–126. This was the first triple-overtime game in NBA finals history; the only triple-overtime finals game since occurred in 1993, in which the Phoenix Suns were again participating.

Coaching changes
In-season
Team	Outgoing coach	Incoming coach
Atlanta Hawks	Cotton Fitzsimmons	Bumper Tormohlen
Detroit Pistons	Ray Scott	Herb Brown

== Final standings ==
=== By division ===
Atlantic Division	W	L	PCT	GB	Home	Road	Div
y-Boston Celtics	54	28	.659	–	31–10	23–18	13–8
x-Philadelphia 76ers	46	36	.561	8	34–7	12–29	9–12
x-Buffalo Braves	46	36	.561	8	28–14	18–22	10–11
New York Knicks	38	44	.463	16	24–17	14–27	10–11

Central Division	W	L	PCT	GB	Home	Road	Div
y-Cleveland Cavaliers	49	33	.598	–	29–12	20–21	15–11
x-Washington Bullets	48	34	.585	1	31–10	17–24	14–12
Houston Rockets	40	42	.488	9	27–13	13–29	14–12
New Orleans Jazz	38	44	.463	11	22–19	16–25	15–11
Atlanta Hawks	29	53	.354	20	20–21	9–32	7–19

Midwest Division	W	L	PCT	GB	Home	Road	Div
y-Milwaukee Bucks	38	44	.463	–	22–19	16–25	13–8
x-Detroit Pistons	36	46	.439	2	24–17	12–29	12–9
Kansas City Kings	31	51	.378	7	25–16	6–35	10–11
Chicago Bulls	24	58	.293	14	15–26	9–32	7–14

Pacific Division	W	L	PCT	GB	Home	Road	Div
y-Golden State Warriors	59	23	.720	–	36–5	23–18	17–9
x-Seattle SuperSonics	43	39	.524	16	31–10	12–29	12–14
x-Phoenix Suns	42	40	.512	17	27–14	15–26	15–11
Los Angeles Lakers	40	42	.488	19	31–11	9–31	10–16
Portland Trail Blazers	37	45	.451	22	25–15	12–30	11–15

=== By conference ===
#	Eastern Conference				
#	Team	W	L	PCT	GB
1	z-Boston Celtics	54	28	.659	–
2	y-Cleveland Cavaliers	49	33	.598	5
3	x-Washington Bullets	48	34	.585	6
4	x-Philadelphia 76ers	46	36	.561	8
5	x-Buffalo Braves	46	36	.561	8
6	Houston Rockets	40	42	.488	14
7	New York Knicks	38	44	.463	16
8	New Orleans Jazz	38	44	.463	16
9	Atlanta Hawks	29	53	.354	25

#	Western Conference				
#	Team	W	L	PCT	GB
1	z-Golden State Warriors	59	23	.720	–
2	x-Seattle SuperSonics	43	39	.524	16
3	x-Phoenix Suns	42	40	.512	17
4	y-Milwaukee Bucks	38	44	.463	21
5	x-Detroit Pistons	36	46	.439	23
6	Los Angeles Lakers	40	42	.488	19
7	Portland Trail Blazers	37	45	.451	22
8	Kansas City Kings	31	51	.378	28
9	Chicago Bulls	24	58	.293	35

Notes

- z, y – division champions
- x – clinched playoff spot

== Playoffs ==
First Round
E4	Philadelphia	1
E5	Buffalo	2
W4	Milwaukee*	1
W5	Detroit	2

Conference Semifinals
E1	Boston*	4
E5	Buffalo	2
Eastern Conference
E3	Washington	3
E2	Cleveland*	4
W1	Golden State*	4
W5	Detroit	2
Western Conference
W3	Phoenix	4
W2	Seattle	2

Conference Finals
E1	Boston*	4
E2	Cleveland*	2
W1	Golden State*	3
W3	Phoenix	4

NBA Finals
E1	Boston*	4
W3	Phoenix	2

- * Division winner
- Bold Series winner
- Italic Team with home-court advantage

== Statistics leaders ==
Category	Player	Team	Stat
Points per game	Bob McAdoo	Buffalo Braves	31.1
Rebounds per game	Kareem Abdul-Jabbar	Los Angeles Lakers	16.9
Assists per game	Slick Watts	Seattle SuperSonics	8.1
Steals per game	Slick Watts	Seattle SuperSonics	3.18
Blocks per game	Kareem Abdul-Jabbar	Los Angeles Lakers	4.12
FG%	Wes Unseld	Washington Bullets	.561
FT%	Rick Barry	Golden State Warriors	.923

== NBA awards ==
- Most Valuable Player: Kareem Abdul-Jabbar, Los Angeles Lakers
- Rookie of the Year: Alvan Adams, Phoenix Suns
- Coach of the Year: Bill Fitch, Cleveland Cavaliers

- All-NBA First Team:
  - F – Rick Barry, Golden State Warriors
  - F – George McGinnis, Philadelphia 76ers
  - C – Kareem Abdul-Jabbar, Los Angeles Lakers
  - G – Nate Archibald, Kansas City Kings
  - G – Pete Maravich, New Orleans Jazz
- All-NBA Second Team:
  - F – Elvin Hayes, Washington Bullets
  - F – John Havlicek, Boston Celtics
  - C – Dave Cowens, Boston Celtics
  - G – Randy Smith, Buffalo Braves
  - G – Phil Smith, Golden State Warriors

- NBA All-Rookie Team:
  - Joe Meriweather, Houston Rockets
  - Alvan Adams, Phoenix Suns
  - Lionel Hollins, Portland Trail Blazers
  - John Shumate, Phoenix Suns/Buffalo Braves
  - Gus Williams, Golden State Warriors

- NBA All-Defensive First Team:
  - Paul Silas, Boston Celtics
  - John Havlicek, Boston Celtics
  - Dave Cowens, Boston Celtics
  - Norm Van Lier, Chicago Bulls
  - Slick Watts, Seattle SuperSonics
- NBA All-Defensive Second Team:
  - Jim Brewer, Cleveland Cavaliers
  - Jamaal Wilkes, Golden State Warriors
  - Kareem Abdul-Jabbar, Los Angeles Lakers
  - Jim Cleamons, Cleveland Cavaliers
  - Phil Smith, Golden State Warriors

== See also ==
- 1976 NBA Finals
- 1976 NBA playoffs
- 1975–76 ABA season
- List of NBA regular season records
