= 1975–76 New York Knicks season =

Season of National Basketball Association team the New York Knicks

- Head coach: Red Holzman
- General manager: Eddie Donovan
- Arena: Madison Square Garden

Results
- Record: 38–44 (.463)
- Place: Division: 4th (Atlantic); Conference: 7th (Eastern)
- Playoff finish: Did not qualify
- Stats at Basketball Reference

Local media
- Television: WOR-TV; Manhattan Cable Television
- Radio: WNEW

The 1975–76 New York Knicks season was the 30th season for the team in the National Basketball Association (NBA). In the regular season, the Knicks had a 38–44 win–loss record, finishing in fourth place in the Atlantic Division and failing to qualify for the 1976 NBA Playoffs. Earl Monroe was the leading scorer for the Knicks with 20.7 points per game. Spencer Haywood led New York in rebounding with 11.3 per game, and Walt Frazier averaged a team-best 5.9 assists per game.

In the 1975 NBA draft, the Knicks had the ninth overall pick and used it to select Gene Short. New York reached an agreement with American Basketball Association forward George McGinnis for a six-year contract, but it was rejected by the NBA because the Philadelphia 76ers held his rights after choosing him in the 1973 NBA draft. The Knicks were stripped of their first-round pick in the 1976 draft for attempting to sign McGinnis. Attempts to sign retired center Wilt Chamberlain were also unsuccessful.

Early in the season, the Knicks lost five consecutive games in November 1975, and by mid-December they had lost 20 of their first 30 games. At this time the Knicks went on a six-game winning streak, and in January 1976 they had another unbeaten run of six games that left their record at 24–23. This was the only point during the season when New York had a winning percentage above .500; they immediately lost five games in a row and remained under .500 for the rest of the season. A March 30 loss to the Phoenix Suns officially eliminated the Knicks from postseason contention; it was the first season since 1965–66 that the team did not reach the playoffs.

== Roster ==
1975–76 New York Knicks roster
Players

Pos.	No.	Player	Height	Weight	DOB	From
G	25	Jim Barnett	6 ft 4 in (1.93 m)	170 lb (77 kg)		Oregon
SF	24	Bill Bradley	6 ft 5 in (1.96 m)	205 lb (93 kg)	1943-07-28	Princeton
PF	31	Mel Davis	6 ft 6 in (1.98 m)	220 lb (100 kg)		St. John's
PG	10	Walt Frazier	6 ft 4 in (1.93 m)	200 lb (91 kg)	1945-03-29	Southern Illinois
C	40	John Gianelli	6 ft 10 in (2.08 m)	220 lb (100 kg)	1950-06-10	Pacific
F	42	Spencer Haywood	6 ft 8 in (2.03 m)	225 lb (102 kg)		Detroit Mercy
PF	18	Phil Jackson	6 ft 8 in (2.03 m)	220 lb (100 kg)	1945-09-17	North Dakota
G	15	Earl Monroe	6 ft 3 in (1.91 m)	185 lb (84 kg)	1944-11-21	Winston-Salem State
C	41	Neal Walk	6 ft 10 in (2.08 m)	220 lb (100 kg)	1948-07-29	Florida
PF	43	Harthorne Wingo	6 ft 6 in (1.98 m)	210 lb (95 kg)	1947-09-09	Friendship College

Coaches
Head coach
- Red Holzman

Legend
- (DP) Unsigned draft pick
- (FA) Free agent
- (S) Suspended
- Injured

== Regular season ==
=== Season standings ===
Atlantic Division	W	L	PCT	GB	Home	Road	Div
y-Boston Celtics	54	28	.659	–	31–10	23–18	13–8
x-Philadelphia 76ers	46	36	.561	8	34–7	12–29	9–12
x-Buffalo Braves	46	36	.561	8	28–14	18–22	10–11
New York Knicks	38	44	.463	16	24–17	14–27	10–11

#	Eastern Conference				
#	Team	W	L	PCT	GB
1	z-Boston Celtics	54	28	.659	–
2	y-Cleveland Cavaliers	49	33	.598	5
3	x-Washington Bullets	48	34	.585	6
4	x-Philadelphia 76ers	46	36	.561	8
5	x-Buffalo Braves	46	36	.561	8
6	Houston Rockets	40	42	.488	14
7	New York Knicks	38	44	.463	16
8	New Orleans Jazz	38	44	.463	16
9	Atlanta Hawks	29	53	.354	25

z – clinched division title
y – clinched division title
x – clinched playoff spot
