= 1975–76 Buffalo Braves season =

1975–76 basketball season for Buffalo Braves

- Head coach: Jack Ramsay
- Arena: Buffalo Memorial Auditorium

Results
- Record: 46–36 (.561)
- Place: Division: 2nd (Atlantic); Conference: 5th (Eastern)
- Playoff finish: East Semifinals (lost to Celtics 2–4)
- Stats at Basketball Reference

Local media
- Television: WBEN-TV
- Radio: WBEN

The 1975–76 Buffalo Braves season was the sixth season for the expansion Buffalo Braves franchise in the National Basketball Association and its Atlantic Division. It was the team's fourth season under head coach Jack Ramsay. The team's official home arena was Buffalo Memorial Auditorium.

Bob McAdoo led the league in scoring for the third consecutive year with 31.1 points per game. It was the third year in a row that the Braves made the playoffs. The Braves had a record of 46–36. In the playoffs the Braves wound up against the Philadelphia 76ers. The series went the full three games but the Braves found themselves on the road for Game 3. The Braves emerged victorious in overtime with a hard-fought 124–123 victory. It was the first playoff series win for the franchise. In the second round of the playoffs, the Braves and Boston Celtics would once again battle. After four games, the series was even at two wins each. Once again the Celtics would take the series in six games.

The season was marked in controversy. Ernie DiGregorio was benched and McAdoo was suspended. Following the season the Braves allowed coach Jack Ramsay to depart for the head coaching job with the Portland Trail Blazers. The team did not resign its auditorium lease and went through the season without a contract. Subsequently, the team was sold, the city sued and the sale was not consummated.

== Offseason ==
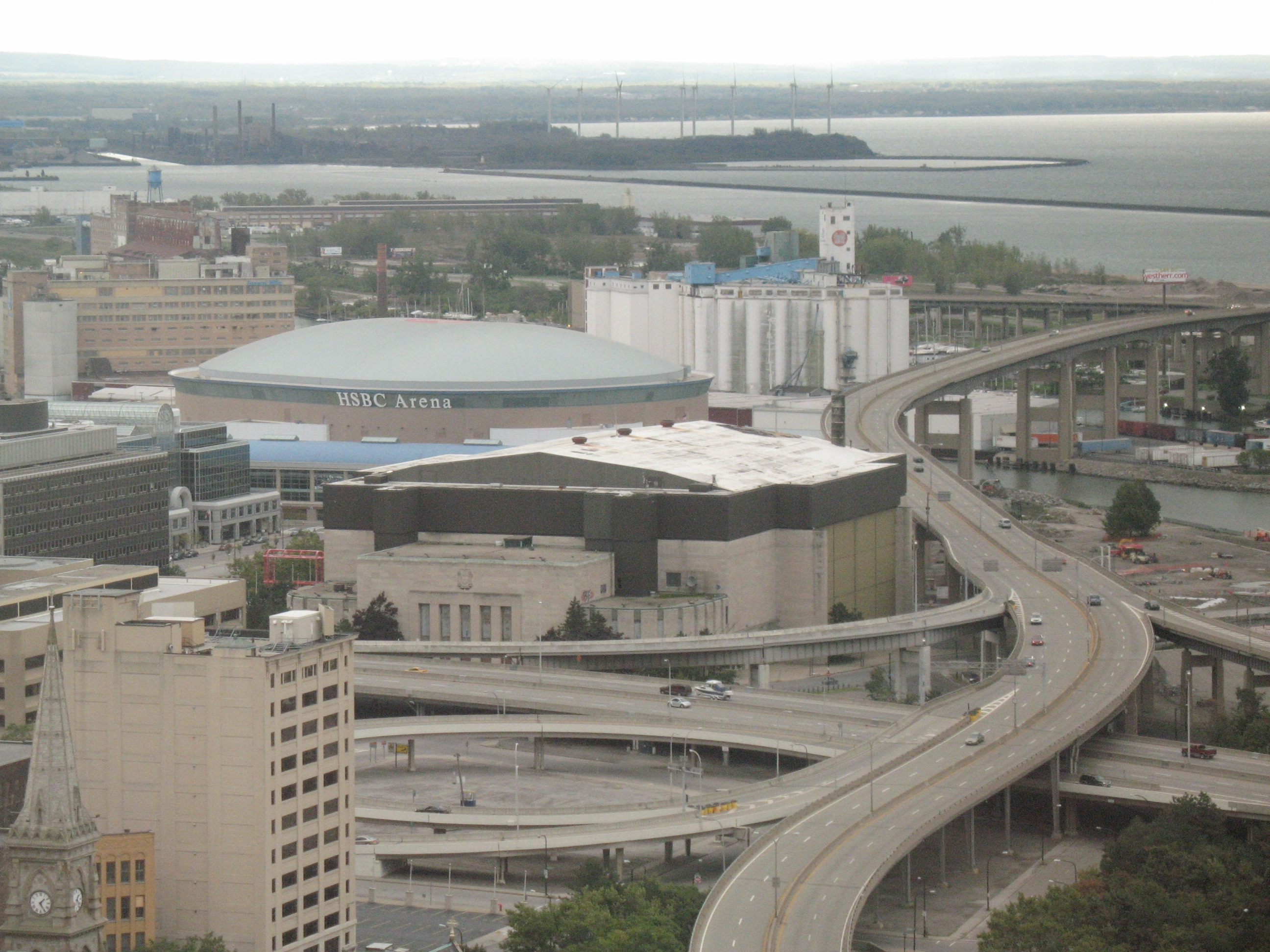
The Braves played most of their home games in the Buffalo Memorial Auditorium (dark rimmed building in front of the HSBC Arena, pictured in 2007).

=== NBA draft ===
The Braves had no selections during the first two rounds of the 1975 NBA draft and no players drafted by the team that year played for the 1975–76 Buffalo. 1974 NBA draft pick Tom McMillen played for a year in Europe before joining the 1975–76 Buffalo Braves. McMillen played in the Italian League for a team in Bologna, Italy and completed the first year of his Rhodes Scholarship at Oxford University. However, he reached an agreement with Oxford to complete his second year during the summer in order to begin his National Basketball Association career. McMillen only played basketball in Italy on the weekends.

| Round | Pick | Player | Position | Nationality | College |
|---|---|---|---|---|---|
| 3 | 52 | George Bucci | Guard | United States | Manhattan College |
| 4 | 70 | Bob Fleischer | Forward | United States | Duke |
| 5 | 88 | Sam Berry | Forward | United States | Armstrong State |
| 6 | 106 | George Jackson | Guard | United States | UNC Charlotte |
| 7 | 124 | Mike Franklin | Forward | United States | Cincinnati |
| 8 | 142 | Allan Jones | Forward | United States | Pepperdine |
| 9 | 158 | George Rautins | Guard | United States | Niagara |
| 10 | 172 | Art Allen | Guard | United States | Pepperdine |

=== Exhibition games ===
On October 4, 1975, the Braves opened their preseason exhibition schedule against the Indiana Pacers of the American Basketball Association. Bob McAdoo had 29 points in the contest in Indianapolis but the Pacers won, 106–105. On October 11, 15,000 fans attended the Braves' home game against the ABA's New York Nets. The Braves held New York's star Julius Erving to 16 points but the Nets prevailed 109–83. On October 14 the Braves traveled to Louisville, Kentucky, to face the ABA's Kentucky Colonels. The Colonels won, 120–116. Two nights later on October 16, 1975, the Braves hit the road to face the ABA's San Antonio Spurs. Bob McAdoo had 22 points and 16 rebounds but the Spurs won 101–90 behind 22 points each for James Silas and George Gervin. The very next night the Braves again faced the New York Nets, this time at Seton Hall University in New Jersey. Bob McAdoo scored 31 points but the Nets won 117–97. The Braves closed out their preseason exhibition schedule with a record of 0–5 against ABA teams.

== Roster ==
1975–76 Buffalo Braves roster
Players

| Pos. | No. | Player | Height | Weight | DOB | From |
|---|---|---|---|---|---|---|
| F | 10 | Don Adams | 6 ft 7 in (2.01 m) | 210 lb (95 kg) | | Northwestern |
| G | 14 | Ken Charles | 6 ft 3 in (1.91 m) | 180 lb (82 kg) | | Fordham |
| G | 15 | Ernie DiGregorio | 6 ft 0 in (1.83 m) | 180 lb (82 kg) | | Providence |
| G | 21 | Dick Gibbs | 6 ft 5 in (1.96 m) | 210 lb (95 kg) | | UTEP |
| F | 24 | Gar Heard | 6 ft 6 in (1.98 m) | 220 lb (100 kg) | | Oklahoma |
| F | 22 | Steve Kuberski | 6 ft 8 in (2.03 m) | 215 lb (98 kg) | | Bradley |
| F | 42 | Jack Marin | 6 ft 6 in (1.98 m) | 210 lb (95 kg) | | Duke |
| C | 11 | Bob McAdoo | 6 ft 9 in (2.06 m) | 210 lb (95 kg) | | North Carolina |
| C | 52 | Tom McMillen | 6 ft 11 in (2.11 m) | 215 lb (98 kg) | | Maryland |
| G | 5 | Jim McMillian | 6 ft 5 in (1.96 m) | 220 lb (100 kg) | | Columbia |
| F | 54 | Dale Schlueter | 6 ft 10 in (2.08 m) | 235 lb (107 kg) | | Colorado State |
| F | 34 | John Shumate | 6 ft 9 in (2.06 m) | 235 lb (107 kg) | | Notre Dame |
| G | 9 | Randy Smith | 6 ft 3 in (1.91 m) | 185 lb (84 kg) | | Buffalo State |
| F | 12 | Jim Washington | 6 ft 6 in (1.98 m) | 210 lb (95 kg) | | Villanova |
| G | 8 | Bob Weiss | 6 ft 3 in (1.91 m) | 185 lb (84 kg) | | Penn State |

Coaches
Head coach
- Jack Ramsay
Assistant(s)
- Tates Locke

Legend
- (DP) Unsigned draft pick
- (FA) Free agent
- (S) Suspended
- Injured

=== Roster notes ===
- Forward Jack Marin would get traded away to the Chicago Bulls in November.
- Forward Gar Heard would get traded away to the Phoenix Suns in February.
- Forwards Steve Kuberski and Jim Washington played in only 10 games and 1 game respectively before being waived in November.

== Regular season ==
The Braves went the entire season without a winning streak or losing streak exceeding six games. The Braves attendance decreased by nearly 50,000 to 418,696 in their 41 home games, and the team fell to 11th of 18 teams.

Shumate, who played 43 games for Phoenix and 32 for Buffalo led the NBA in field goal percentage (56.1) and earned first team All-rookie honors. DiGregorio, who played 67 games posted a 91.5% (86/94) free throw percentage, which would have been second to Rick Barry's 92.3 if he had posted a qualifying number of attempts. Marin, who played 12 games for the Braves before being traded, finished 9th in the NBA in free throw percentage (85.6%). McMillian ranked 3rd in field goal percentage (53.6%) and 8th in free throw percentage (85.8). Randy Smith, who played all 82 games for the fourth consecutive season, represented Buffalo in the 1976 NBA All-Star Game and earned 2nd team All-NBA honors. Smith ranked third in steals per game (2.5), fourth in assists per game (6.5), seventh in points per game (21.8) and ninth in minutes per game (38.6). Smith's speed was a difference maker on the Braves' fast breaks. McAdoo appeared in the third of five consecutive NBA All-Star games and placed second in the MVP voting despite not making the All-NBA team that included centers Kareem Abdul-Jabbar and Dave Cowens. McAdoo led the winning east team in scoring with 22 points in the All-Star game, but Dave Bing was selected as MVP. Over the course of the season he made both the most field goals and most free throws in the NBA. He led the league in minutes played (42.7) and points per game (31.1) while ranking seventh in rebound average (12.4) and sixth in blocks per game (2.1).

October–December

As the season began, the Braves refused to sign the lease terms for Memorial Auditorium because Braves owner Paul Snyder felt it was unfair for the Braves to be held to different terms than their co-tenant, the Buffalo Sabres. Although the Buffalo Common Council had approved a lease in July, the Braves entered the season without an agreement.

During the November 14 game at Milwaukee a bench-clearing brawl erupted as a result of an incident between Bucks Gary Brokaw and Bob Dandridge and Brave Dick Gibbs. The following week McAdoo broke the Cleveland Coliseum single-game scoring record by posting 50 points in a 23-point deficit come-from-behind overtime victory. He surpassed his own 49 point performance the prior year at the Coliseum; both games were against his friend Jim Chones. On December 2, 1974, NBA Rookie of the Year DiGregorio was benched in favor of Charles for the sake of team defense. In Charles' first start, he led the team in scoring with a career-high 24 on the way to the franchise record 37-point December 5 victory over the Cleveland Cavaliers. In late December, McAdoo was suspended by the team for failing to make a doctor's appointment as the Braves claimed his self-diagnosed back injury was dubious.

January–February

The Braves began the new year by playing in three consecutive one-point contests, first splitting with the New York Knicks on January 2 and January 3, and then defeating the Los Angeles Lakers on January 6. All games were won by the home team. The Braves established an all-sport all-time attendance record for Memorial Auditorium of 19,226 on January 31 when they hosted the Boston Celtics. That night, John Havlicek became the NBAs fourth leading scorer, surpassing Elgin Baylor. The day before the game the Braves had reached an agreement on sharing playing dates with the Sabres and decided not to attempt to leave town. On February 1 during the All-star break, the Braves dealt Heard for Shumate. At the time the Braves had a 30–20 record and they would go 16–16 for the rest of the season. During the February 3, 1976 NBA All-Star Game, Smith scored 8 points, while McAdoo had a game-high 22. McAdoo contributed to a key fourth quarter spurt that propelled the East to victory.

March–April

As the season wound down, the Braves were battling with the Philadelphia 76ers for home court advantage in the opening round series. The Braves defeated the Celtics twice in the final two weeks to even their season series at three games a piece while winning five of their last seven games. The Braves were scheduled to host the New York Knicks on April 6, but when the Buffalo Sabres qualified for the 1976 Stanley Cup playoffs, the National Hockey League scheduled the Sabres to be the home team on the same date. When the Braves set a $25,000 price tag on the date, the Sabres swapped home game dates with the St. Louis Blues and lost on St. Louis in a best of three series on that date.

=== Season standings ===
| Atlantic Division | W | L | PCT | GB | Home | Road | Div |
|---|---|---|---|---|---|---|---|
| y-Boston Celtics | 54 | 28 | .659 | – | 31–10 | 23–18 | 13–8 |
| x-Philadelphia 76ers | 46 | 36 | .561 | 8 | 34–7 | 12–29 | 9–12 |
| x-Buffalo Braves | 46 | 36 | .561 | 8 | 28–14 | 18–22 | 10–11 |
| New York Knicks | 38 | 44 | .463 | 16 | 24–17 | 14–27 | 10–11 |

| # | Eastern Conference | | | | |
| # | Team | W | L | PCT | GB |
|---|---|---|---|---|---|
| 1 | z-Boston Celtics | 54 | 28 | .659 | – |
| 2 | y-Cleveland Cavaliers | 49 | 33 | .598 | 5 |
| 3 | x-Washington Bullets | 48 | 34 | .585 | 6 |
| 4 | x-Philadelphia 76ers | 46 | 36 | .561 | 8 |
| 5 | x-Buffalo Braves | 46 | 36 | .561 | 8 |
| 6 | Houston Rockets | 40 | 42 | .488 | 14 |
| 7 | New York Knicks | 38 | 44 | .463 | 16 |
| 8 | New Orleans Jazz | 38 | 44 | .463 | 16 |
| 9 | Atlanta Hawks | 29 | 53 | .354 | 25 |

=== Season schedule ===
1975–76 game log
Total: 46–36 (home: 28–14; road: 18–22
October: 3–0 (home: 2–0; road: 1–0)

| Game | Date | Team | Score | High points | High rebounds | High assists | Location Attendance | Record |
|---|---|---|---|---|---|---|---|---|
| 1 | October 25 | Golden State Warriors | 105–92 | 1–0 | Win 1 | | | |
| 2 | October 28 | Houston Rockets | 124–108 | 2–0 | Win 2 | | | |
| 3 | October 31 | @ Philadelphia 76ers | 92–87 | 3–0 | Win 3 | | | |

November: 6–9 (home: 3–4; road: 3–5)

| Game | Date | Team | Score | High points | High rebounds | High assists | Location Attendance | Record |
|---|---|---|---|---|---|---|---|---|
| 4 | November 1 | Detroit Pistons | 97–93 | 4–0 | Win 4 | | | |
| 5 | November 4 | Philadelphia 76ers | 114–121 | 4–1 | Loss 1 | | | |
| 6 | November 5 | @ Boston Celtics | 95–105 | 4–2 | Loss 2 | | | |
| 7 | November 8 | Phoenix Suns | 110–105 | 5–2 | Win 1 | | | |
| 8 | November 11 | Washington Bullets | 90–105 | 5–3 | Loss 1 | | | |
| 9 | November 12 | @ Houston Rockets | 93–80 | 6–3 | Win 1 | | | |
| 10 | November 14 | @ Milwaukee Bucks | 112–98 | 7–3 | Win 2 | | | |
| 11 | November 15 | Boston Celtics | 110–112 | 7–4 | Loss 1 | | | |
| 12 | November 18 | Los Angeles Lakers | 120–106 | 8–4 | Win 1 | | | |
| 13 | November 20 | @ Cleveland Cavaliers | 118–115 (OT) | 9–4 | Win 2 | | | |
| 14 | November 21 | @ Detroit Pistons | 94–104 | 9–5 | Loss 1 | | | |
| 15 | November 22 | Portland Trail Blazers | 104–109 | 9–6 | Loss 2 | | | |
| 16 | November 26 | @ Phoenix Suns | 106–107 | 9–7 | Loss 3 | | | |
| 17 | November 28 | @ Los Angeles Lakers | 105–126 | 9–8 | Loss 4 | | | |
| 18 | November 29 | @ Portland Trail Blazers | 115–130 | 9–9 | Loss 5 | | | |

December: 10–6 (home: 8–1; road: 2–5)

| Game | Date | Team | Score | High points | High rebounds | High assists | Location Attendance | Record |
|---|---|---|---|---|---|---|---|---|
| 19 | December 2 | New Orleans Jazz | 96–108 | 9–10 | Loss 6 | | | |
| 20 | December 5 | Cleveland Cavaliers | 125–88 | 10–10 | Win 1 | | | |
| 21 | December 6 | @ New York Knicks | 98–108 | 10–11 | Loss 1 | | | |
| 22 | December 9 | Kansas City Kings | 126–107 | 11–11 | Win 1 | | | |
| 23 | December 11 | @ Atlanta Hawks | 99–122 | 11–12 | Loss 1 | | | |
| 24 | December 12 | New York Knicks | 123–110 | 12–12 | Win 1 | | | |
| 25 | December 13 | @ Chicago Bulls | 103–101 | 13–12 | Win 2 | | | |
| 26 | December 16 | @ Washington Bullets | 94–100 | 13–13 | Loss 1 | | | |
| 27 | December 17 | Houston Rockets | 88–85 | 14–13 | Win 1 | | | |
| 28 | December 19 | Washington Bullets | 104–88 | 15–13 | Win 2 | | | |
| 29 | December 20 | @ Kansas City Kings | 117–110 | 16–13 | Win 3 | | | |
| 30 | December 23 | Boston Celtics | 101–92 | 17–13 | Win 4 | | | |
| 31 | December 26 | @ Philadelphia 76ers | 95–96 | 17–14 | Loss 1 | | | |
| 32 | December 27 | Philadelphia 76ers | 130–105 | 18–14 | Win 1 | | | |
| 33 | December 28 | @ Cleveland Cavaliers | 88–111 | 18–15 | Loss 1 | | | |
| 34 | December 30 | Milwaukee Bucks | 118–106 | 19–15 | Win 1 | | | |

January: 11–5 (home: 6–2; road: 5–3)

| Game | Date | Team | Score | High points | High rebounds | High assists | Location Attendance | Record |
|---|---|---|---|---|---|---|---|---|
| 35 | January 2 | New York Knicks | 106–105 | 20–15 | Win 2 | | | |
| 36 | January 3 | @ New York Knicks | 106–107 | 20–16 | Loss 1 | | | |
| 37 | January 6 | Los Angeles Lakers | 114–113 | 21–16 | Win 1 | | | |
| 38 | January 9 | Chicago Bulls | 100–107 | 21–17 | Loss 1 | | | |
| 39 | January 11 | @ Seattle SuperSonics | 125–104 | 22–17 | Win 1 | | | |
| 40 | January 13 | @ Golden State Warriors | 101–127 | 22–18 | Loss 1 | | | |
| 41 | January 15 | @ Phoenix Suns | 126–119 | 23–18 | Win 1 | | | |
| 42 | January 16 | @ Chicago Bulls | 110–104 | 24–18 | Win 2 | | | |
| 43 | January 17 | Seattle SuperSonics | 110–101 | 25–18 | Win 3 | | | |
| 44 | January 20 | Phoenix Suns | 112–103 | 26–18 | Win 4 | | | |
| 45 | January 21 | @ Atlanta Hawks | 102–94 | 27–18 | Win 5 | | | |
| 46 | January 23 | Atlanta Hawks | 119–104 | 28–18 | Win 6 | | | |
| 47 | January 25 | @ Boston Celtics | 107–135 | 28–19 | Loss 1 | | | |
| 48 | January 27 | New Orleans Jazz | 129–105 | 29–19 | Win 1 | | | |
| 49 | January 28 | @ New Orleans Jazz | 126–112 | 30–19 | Win 2 | | | |
| 50 | January 31 | Boston Celtics | 100–109 | 30–20 | Loss 1 | | | |

February: 5–6 (home: 3–4; road: 2–2)

| Game | Date | Team | Score | High points | High rebounds | High assists | Location Attendance | Record |
|---|---|---|---|---|---|---|---|---|
| 51 | February 6 | Milwaukee Bucks | 109–104 | 31–20 | Win 1 | | | |
| 52 | February 8 | @ Philadelphia 76ers | 97–100 | 31–21 | Loss 1 | | | |
| 53 | February 10 | Washington Bullets | 115–105 | 32–21 | Win 1 | | | |
| 54 | February 13 | @ Kansas City Kings | 101–96 | 33–21 | Win 2 | | | |
| 55 | February 14 | Cleveland Cavaliers | 111–114 | 33–22 | Loss 1 | | | |
| 56 | February 15 | @ Atlanta Hawks | 104–112 | 33–23 | Loss 2 | | | |
| 57 | February 17 | Portland Trail Blazers | 116–113 | 34–23 | Win 1 | | | |
| 58 | February 21 | Detroit Pistons | 112–114 | 34–24 | Loss 1 | | | |
| 59 | February 24 | @ New York Knicks | 109–103 | 35–24 | Win 1 | | | |
| 60 | February 25 | Seattle SuperSonics | 94–126 | 35–25 | Loss 1 | | | |
| 61 | February 27 | Houston Rockets | 107–113 | 35–26 | Loss 2 | | | |

November: 7–9 (home: 4–2; road: 3–7)

| Game | Date | Team | Score | High points | High rebounds | High assists | Location Attendance | Record |
|---|---|---|---|---|---|---|---|---|
| 62 | March 2 | Golden State Warriors | 93–100 | 35–27 | Loss 3 | | | |
| 63 | March 6 | Philadelphia 76ers | 105–99 | 36–27 | Win 1 | | | |
| 64 | March 10 | @ New Orleans Jazz | 120–105 | 37–27 | Win 2 | | | |
| 65 | March 12 | Houston Rockets | 100–113 | 37–28 | Loss 1 | | | |
| 66 | March 14 | @ Los Angeles Lakers | 109–137 | 37–29 | Loss 2 | | | |
| 67 | March 16 | @ Portland Trail Blazers | 112–95 | 38–29 | Win 1 | | | |
| 68 | March 17 | @ Seattle SuperSonics | 111–122 | 38–30 | Loss 1 | | | |
| 69 | March 18 | @ Golden State Warriors | 109–110 | 38–31 | Loss 2 | | | |
| 70 | March 20 | New Orleans Jazz | 115–101 | 39–31 | Win 1 | | | |
| 71 | March 21 | @ Detroit Pistons | 112–118 | 39–32 | Loss 1 | | | |
| 72 | March 23 | Chicago Bulls | 122–109 | 40–32 | Win 1 | | | |
| 73 | March 25 | @ Cleveland Cavaliers | 109–94 | 41–32 | Win 2 | | | |
| 74 | March 26 | @ Milwaukee Bucks | 92–123 | 41–33 | Loss 1 | | | |
| 75 | March 28 | @ Washington Bullets | 90–113 | 41–34 | Loss 2 | | | |
| 76 | March 30 | Boston Celtics | 93–83 | 42–34 | Win 1 | | | |
| 77 | March 31 | @ Philadelphia 76ers | 103–107 | 42–35 | Loss 1 | | | |

April: 4–1 (home: 2–1; road: 2–0)

| Game | Date | Team | Score | High points | High rebounds | High assists | Location Attendance | Record |
|---|---|---|---|---|---|---|---|---|
| 78 | April 2 | Atlanta Hawks | 101–93 | 43–35 | Win 1 | | | |
| 79 | April 4 | @ Boston Celtics | 117–114 | 44–35 | Win 2 | | | |
| 80 | April 6 | New York Knicks | 102–106 | 44–36 | Loss 1 | | | |
| 81 | April 8 | @ New York Knicks | 105–98 | 45–36 | Win 1 | | | |
| 82 | April 11 | Kansas City Kings | 99–98 | 46–36 | Win 2 | | | |

Source: www.basketball-reference.com

== Playoffs ==
In the 1976 NBA Playoffs, McMillian boosted his 15.8 points per game to 17.2, and Smith also boosted his production to 8.6 assists per game, which led the league, while contributing 22.6 points. For the second year in a row, McAdoo led the league in minutes per game in the playoffs (45.1), while posting 28.0 points per game.

First round

The Braves concluded the regular season tied with the Philadelphia 76ers for fourth place in the Eastern Conference with a 46–36 record. The Braves lost the regular season series with the 76ers 4 games to 3 giving Philadelphia home court advantage for the three-game Eastern Conference First Round series between the conference's fourth and fifth place teams. During the series, the road team won each of the three games including the final game, which Buffalo won 124–123 in overtime.

In the first round, the Braves won the first game 95–89 on 36 points from McAdoo and 6 points from McMillian in the final 1:23. Although the Braves led most of the way, it took a three-point play by McAdoo with 4:37 left to give them the lead for good at 87–85. George McGinnis posted 34 points as the 76ers evened the series with a 131–106 victory in game 2. The Braved clinched game 3 in overtime as McAdoo scored two free throws to tie the game in regulation and two more with 17 seconds left in overtime as Buffalo won 124–123. The game included clutch shots by Shumate and a strong shooting performance by Smith. Philadelphia took the lead in the first quarter and did not relinquish it until the McMillian gave the Braves a 95–94 lead with 8:11 remaining in regulation. McGinnis had fouled out with 8:50 remaining. The Braves held the lead until Doug Collins scored with 41 seconds left to tie the score at 109 and Fred Carter gave Philadelphia a 111–109 lead with 6 seconds remaining. After a couple of offensive rebounds on their final possession Clyde Lee fouled McAdoo who tied the score from the line. Shumate had 11 fourth quarter points and a pair of early overtime baskets. Smith gave the Braves the lead for good with 51 seconds left in overtime.

The win over Philadelphia would be the Braves' only playoff series win in Buffalo; in fact, it would be their only playoff victory in the first 35 years of the franchise, until the twice-relocated Los Angeles Clippers eliminated the Denver Nuggets in 2006.

Second round

In the second round, the Braves opposed the Eastern Conference regular season champion Boston Celtics in the Eastern Conference semifinals. The first five games of the series went to the home team and then Boston won game six in Buffalo to clinch the series.

Dave Cowens accumulated 30 points, 19 rebounds, 7 assists and 5 steals in leading the Celtics past the Braves by a 107–98 margin in game 1. Although McAdoo scored 40 points in game 2 and the Celtics played without John Havlicek, his replacements Don Nelson and Steve Kuberski stepped up to enable the Celtics to take a 2–0 lead in the series with a 101–96 victory. In game 3, the Braves won 98–93, as Smith scored 29 and McAdoo added 24, including 10 in the fourth quarter. Buffalo had fallen behind by 12 points after one quarter. Starter-turned-reserve DiGregorio entered the game in the second quarter with the Braves behind 32–22, but he posted 8 points and 5 assists in the quarter to spark a 21–4 surge that gave the team a 43–36 lead. He finished with 10 assists. In game 4, Smith made a 25-foot jump shot with three seconds remaining to give the Braves a 124–122 victory and tie the series 2–2. Havlicek, who missed games 2 through 4 with a foot injury, returned to help the Celtics win game 5 as Paul Silas had 15 points and 22 rebounds and Cowens amassed 30 points and 16 rebounds. After a 32–32 tie, Cowens, who had 14 second quarter points, led the Celtics to a 46–36 halftime lead. The Braves closed to within 50–46, but the Celtics pulled away and took a 76–65 lead after three quarters. Although Charlie Scott fouled out in the fourth quarter, so did McAdoo. In game 6, the Celtics led 30–27 after one quarter, but trailed 55–50 at the half and 78–77 after three quarters. At one point, 9 third quarter points by McMillian helped push Buffalo to a 9-point lead. Scott scored 13 of his game-high 31 points in the final quarter. Jo Jo White had 23 points and Cowens had 10 points and 16 rebounds in the final game as the Celtics clinched the series 4–2 with a 104–100 victory.

=== Playoff schedule ===
1976 playoff game log
First Round: 2–1 (home: 0–1; road: 2–0)

| Game | Date | Team | Score | High points | High rebounds | High assists | Location Attendance | Series |
|---|---|---|---|---|---|---|---|---|
| 1 | April 15 | @ Philadelphia | W 95–89 | Bob McAdoo (36) | Bob McAdoo (21) | Randy Smith (13) | Spectrum; 14,352 | 1–0 |
| 2 | April 16 | Philadelphia | L 106–131 | Randy Smith (27) | Bob McAdoo (13) | Randy Smith (7) | Buffalo Memorial Auditorium; 12,049 | 1–1 |
| 3 | April 18 | @ Philadelphia | W 124–123 (OT) | Bob McAdoo (34) | Bob McAdoo (22) | Randy Smith (11) | Spectrum; 13,087 | 2–1 |

Conference Semifinals: 2–4 (home: 2–1; road: 0–3)

| Game | Date | Team | Score | High points | High rebounds | High assists | Location Attendance | Series |
|---|---|---|---|---|---|---|---|---|
| 1 | April 21 | @ Boston | L 98–107 | Randy Smith (27) | Randy Smith (10) | Randy Smith (12) | Boston Garden; 13,919 | 0–1 |
| 2 | April 23 | @ Boston | L 96–101 | Bob McAdoo (40) | John Shumate (11) | Randy Smith (7) | Boston Garden; 15,320 | 0–2 |
| 3 | April 25 | Boston | W 98–93 | Randy Smith (29) | Randy Smith (14) | Ernie DiGregorio (10) | Buffalo Memorial Auditorium; 12,079 | 1–2 |
| 4 | April 28 | Boston | W 124–122 | Bob McAdoo (30) | Bob McAdoo (17) | Randy Smith (10) | Buffalo Memorial Auditorium; 16,193 | 2–2 |
| 5 | April 30 | @ Boston | L 88–99 | Bob McAdoo (23) | Bob McAdoo (14) | Ernie DiGregorio (6) | Boston Garden; 15,320 | 2–3 |
| 6 | May 2 | Boston | L 100–104 | Bob McAdoo (28) | John Shumate (16) | Ernie DiGregorio (8) | Buffalo Memorial Auditorium; 16,261 | 2–4 |

1976 schedule

Source: www.basketball-reference.com

== Player stats ==
Legend
| GP | Games played | MPG | Minutes per game | FG | Field-goals per game | FGA | Field-goals attempted per Game |
| FG% | Field-goal percentage | FT | Free-throws per game | FTA | Free-throws attempted per Game | FT% | Free-throw percentage |
| ORPG | Offensive rebounds per game | DRPG | Defensive rebounds per game | RPG | Rebounds per game | APG | Assists per game |
| SPG | Steals per game | BPG | Blocks per game | PFPG | Personal fouls per game | PPG | Points per game |

| Player | GP | MPG | FG | FGA | FG% | FT | FTA | FT% | ORPG | DRPG | RPG | APG | SPG | BPG | PFPG | PPG |
|---|---|---|---|---|---|---|---|---|---|---|---|---|---|---|---|---|
| Bob McAdoo | 78 | 42.7 | 12 | 24.6 | 0.487 | 7.2 | 9.4 | 0.762 | 3.1 | 9.3 | 12.4 | 4 | 1.2 | 2.1 | 3.8 | 31.1 |
| Randy Smith | 82 | 38.6 | 8.6 | 17.3 | 0.494 | 4.7 | 5.7 | 0.817 | 1.3 | 3.8 | 5.1 | 5.9 | 1.9 | 0 | 3.3 | 21.8 |
| Jim McMillian | 74 | 35.3 | 6.6 | 12.4 | 0.536 | 2.5 | 3 | 0.858 | 1.8 | 3.5 | 5.3 | 2.8 | 1.2 | 0.2 | 1.9 | 15.8 |
| John Shumate | 32 | 32.7 | 4.6 | 7.9 | 0.575 | 3 | 4.5 | 0.678 | 2.6 | 7.3 | 9.8 | 2 | 1.2 | 0.6 | 2.6 | 12.2 |
| Ken Charles | 81 | 27.7 | 4 | 8.9 | 0.456 | 2 | 2.5 | 0.785 | 0.7 | 2 | 2.7 | 2.5 | 1.5 | 0.6 | 3.2 | 10.1 |
| Gar Heard | 50 | 30.5 | 4.1 | 9.8 | 0.421 | 1.6 | 2.7 | 0.607 | 2.8 | 7.5 | 10.2 | 2.5 | 1.3 | 1.1 | 3.7 | 9.9 |
| Jack Marin | 12 | 23.2 | 3.4 | 7.8 | 0.436 | 2.3 | 2.8 | 0.818 | 0.8 | 2.5 | 3.3 | 1.9 | 0.6 | 0.5 | 2.5 | 9.1 |
| Ernie DiGregorio | 67 | 20.4 | 2.7 | 7.1 | 0.384 | 1.3 | 1.4 | 0.915 | 0.2 | 1.4 | 1.7 | 4 | 0.6 | 0 | 2.4 | 6.7 |
| Dick Gibbs | 72 | 12 | 1.8 | 4.2 | 0.429 | 1.1 | 1.3 | 0.828 | 0.6 | 0.9 | 1.5 | 0.7 | 0.2 | 0.2 | 1.8 | 4.7 |
| Tom McMillen | 50 | 14.2 | 1.9 | 4.4 | 0.432 | 0.8 | 1.1 | 0.759 | 1.3 | 2.4 | 3.7 | 1.4 | 0.1 | 0.1 | 1.7 | 4.7 |
| Bob Weiss | 66 | 15.1 | 1.3 | 2.8 | 0.486 | 0.5 | 0.7 | 0.729 | 0.2 | 0.8 | 1 | 2.3 | 0.7 | 0.2 | 1.4 | 3.2 |
| Don Adams | 56 | 12.6 | 1.2 | 3 | 0.394 | 0.7 | 1 | 0.702 | 0.7 | 1.9 | 2.6 | 1.3 | 0.5 | 0.1 | 2.3 | 3.1 |
| Dale Schlueter | 71 | 10.9 | 0.9 | 1.7 | 0.5 | 0.8 | 1.1 | 0.667 | 0.8 | 2.3 | 3.2 | 1.1 | 0.2 | 0.2 | 2 | 2.5 |
| Steve Kuberski | 10 | 8.5 | 0.7 | 1.7 | 0.412 | 0.3 | 0.3 | 1 | 0.4 | 2.1 | 2.5 | 0.3 | 0.1 | 0.2 | 1 | 1.7 |
| Jim Washington | 1 | 7 | 0 | 1 | 0 | 0 | 0 | | 1 | 0 | 1 | 1 | 0 | 0 | 0 | 0 |

== Awards and honors ==
- Bob McAdoo, NBA Scoring Champion
- Bob McAdoo, 1976 NBA All-Star Game
- Randy Smith, 1976 NBA All-Star Game
- Randy Smith, 1976 All-NBA (2nd team)
- John Shumate, NBA All-Rookie Team (Note: Shumate started the season with the Phoenix Suns but ended the season as a member of the Buffalo Braves)
- John Shumate, NBA Field goal percentage champion

== Transactions ==
On October 14, 1975, the Braves lost Lee Winfield on waivers to the Kansas City Kings. Paul Ruffner did not return to play for the 1975–76 Buffalo Braves and never again played in the NBA. On November 20, 1975, Steve Kuberski was waived. On November 27, 1975, Jack Marin was traded to the Chicago Bulls for a 1977 NBA draft 1st round pick. On February 1, 1976, Gar Heard was dealt with a 1976 NBA draft 2nd round pick to the Phoenix Suns for John Shumate.

The Braves were involved in the following transactions during the 1975–76 season.

=== Trades ===
May 29, 1975
To Buffalo Braves

- 1976 1st round draft pick
To Phoenix Suns

- 16th pick of the 1975 NBA Draft
July 30, 1975
To Buffalo Braves

- Dick Gibbs
To Washington Bullets

- 1976 1st round draft pick
November 27, 1975
To Buffalo Braves

- 1977 1st round draft pick
To Chicago Bulls

- Jack Marin
February 1, 1976
To Buffalo Braves

- John Shumate
To Phoenix Suns

- Gar Heard
- 1976 2nd round draft pick

=== Free agents ===
==== Additions ====
| Player | Signed | Former team |
| Tom McMillen | June 3 | (Italy) Virtus Bologna |
| Steve Kuberski | claimed off waivers, October 16 | Milwaukee Bucks |
| Don Adams | December 5 | Spirit of St. Louis |

==== Subtractions ====
| Player | Left | New team |
| Paul Ruffner | waived, July 1 | Spirit of St. Louis |
| Lee Winfield | waived, October 10 | Kansas City Kings |
| Jim Washington | waived, November 11 | Retired |
| Steve Kuberski | waived, November 20 | Boston Celtics |
