= 1976 NBA playoffs =

Postseason tournament

Tournament details
- Dates: April 13–June 6, 1976
- Season: 1975–76
- Teams: 10

Final positions
- Champions: Boston Celtics (13th title)
- Runners-up: Phoenix Suns
- Semifinalists: Golden State Warriors; Cleveland Cavaliers

The 1976 NBA playoffs was the postseason tournament of the National Basketball Association's 1975–76 season. The tournament concluded with the Eastern Conference champion Boston Celtics defeating the Western Conference champion Phoenix Suns 4 games to 2 in the NBA Finals. The series was highlighted by Game 5, a 3-OT victory by Boston. The Celtics won their 13th NBA title, second in the Dave Cowens era. Jo Jo White was named NBA Finals MVP.

This is the last postseason that had a 10 team format before the 1977 playoffs expanded to 12 teams.

The Suns earned their first two playoff series victories in franchise history to advance to the NBA Finals; they won their second Western Conference title in 1993, and their third title in 2021.

The sixth-year Cleveland Cavaliers made their first playoff appearance and won their first playoff series. They wouldn't win another playoff series until 1992.

This was the final playoff appearance for the Buffalo Braves franchise in Buffalo until 1992, when they returned as the Los Angeles Clippers.

This would prove the last Conference Finals appearance for the Golden State Warriors until 2015 under the leadership of Steph Curry.

The Philadelphia 76ers made the playoffs for the first time since 1971, starting a 12-season run that included four NBA Finals appearances (1977, 1980, 1982, and 1983 (winning in the latter year)). The Sixers did not miss the playoffs again until 1988.

Despite winning their division with a losing record of 38–44, the Milwaukee Bucks were forced to play in the best of three first round against the Detroit Pistons.

This is also noted to be the most recent NBA Playoffs that did not include a sweep and the last time a team from Texas did not appear in the playoffs (until 2023).

== Bracket ==
First Round
E4	Philadelphia	1
E5	Buffalo	2
W4	Milwaukee*	1
W5	Detroit	2

Conference Semifinals
E1	Boston*	4
E5	Buffalo	2
Eastern Conference
E3	Washington	3
E2	Cleveland*	4
W1	Golden State*	4
W5	Detroit	2
Western Conference
W3	Phoenix	4
W2	Seattle	2

Conference Finals
E1	Boston*	4
E2	Cleveland*	2
W1	Golden State*	3
W3	Phoenix	4

NBA Finals
E1	Boston*	4
W3	Phoenix	2

- * Division winner
- Bold Series winner
- Italic Team with home-court advantage

== First round ==
=== Eastern Conference first round ===
==== (4) Philadelphia 76ers vs. (5) Buffalo Braves ====
April 15

Boxscore

Buffalo Braves 95, Philadelphia 76ers 89
Scoring by quarter: 28–22, 23–25, 22–25, 22–17
Pts: Bob McAdoo 36; Rebs: Bob McAdoo 21; Asts: Randy Smith 13	Pts: Fred Carter 30; Rebs: George McGinnis 15; Asts: George McGinnis 4
Buffalo leads series, 1–0

Spectrum, Philadelphia, Pennsylvania
Attendance: 14,352

April 16

Boxscore

Philadelphia 76ers 131, Buffalo Braves 106
Scoring by quarter: 29–24, 34–24, 32–37, 36–21
Pts: George McGinnis 34; Rebs: George McGinnis 11; Asts: Fred Carter 6	Pts: Randy Smith 27; Rebs: Bob McAdoo 13; Asts: Randy Smith 7
Series tied, 1–1

Buffalo Memorial Auditorium, Buffalo, New York
Attendance: 12,049

April 18

Boxscore

Buffalo Braves 124, Philadelphia 76ers 123 (OT)
Scoring by quarter: 32–32, 23–32, 32–25, 24–22, Overtime: 13–12
Pts: Bob McAdoo 34; Rebs: Bob McAdoo 22; Asts: Randy Smith 11	Pts: Fred Carter 32; Rebs: George McGinnis 15; Asts: Fred Carter 6
Buffalo wins series, 2–1

Spectrum, Philadelphia, Pennsylvania
Attendance: 13,087

This was the first playoff meeting between these two teams.

=== Western Conference first round ===
==== (4) Milwaukee Bucks vs. (5) Detroit Pistons ====
April 13

Boxscore

Detroit Pistons 107, Milwaukee Bucks 110
Scoring by quarter: 25–23, 31–30, 23–28, 28–29
Pts: Bob Lanier 25; Rebs: Bob Lanier 15; Asts: Lanier, Clark 6 each	Pts: Gary Brokaw 36; Rebs: Elmore Smith 13; Asts: Brian Winters 7
Milwaukee leads series, 1–0

MECCA Arena, Milwaukee, Wisconsin
Attendance: 8,912

April 15

Boxscore

Milwaukee Bucks 123, Detroit Pistons 126
Scoring by quarter: 27–34, 31–26, 30–32, 35–34
Pts: Winters, Dandridge 31 each Rebs: Bob Dandridge 9 Asts: Gary Brokaw 12	Pts: Bob Lanier 35; Rebs: Curtis Rowe 10; Asts: Money, Clark 5 each
Series tied, 1–1

Cobo Arena, Detroit, Michigan
Attendance: 8,330

April 18

Boxscore

Detroit Pistons 107, Milwaukee Bucks 104
Scoring by quarter: 36–29, 20–26, 24–27, 27–22
Pts: Bob Lanier 28; Rebs: Bob Lanier 12; Asts: Eric Money 8	Pts: Brian Winters 33; Rebs: Dave Meyers 10; Asts: Gary Brokaw 7
Detroit wins series, 2–1

MECCA Arena, Milwaukee, Wisconsin
Attendance: 8,213

This was the first playoff meeting between these two teams.

== Conference semifinals ==
=== Eastern Conference semifinals ===
==== (1) Boston Celtics vs. (5) Buffalo Braves ====
April 21

Boxscore

Buffalo Braves 98, Boston Celtics 107
Scoring by quarter: 31–29, 20–26, 25–29, 22–23
Pts: Randy Smith 27; Rebs: Randy Smith 10; Asts: Randy Smith 12	Pts: Dave Cowens 30; Rebs: Dave Cowens 17; Asts: Jo Jo White 8
Boston leads series, 1–0

Boston Garden, Boston, Massachusetts
Attendance: 13,919

April 23

Boxscore

Buffalo Braves 96, Boston Celtics 101
Scoring by quarter: 24–28, 24–27, 25–24, 23–22
Pts: Bob McAdoo 40; Rebs: John Shumate 11; Asts: Randy Smith 7	Pts: Dave Cowens 27; Rebs: Dave Cowens 18; Asts: Charlie Scott 6
Boston leads series, 2–0

Boston Garden, Boston, Massachusetts
Attendance: 15,320

April 25

Boxscore

Boston Celtics 93, Buffalo Braves 98
Scoring by quarter: 24–12, 23–36, 25–24, 21–26
Pts: Jo Jo White 26; Rebs: Dave Cowens 14; Asts: Charlie Scott 7	Pts: Randy Smith 29; Rebs: Randy Smith 14; Asts: Ernie DiGregorio 10
Boston leads series, 2–1

Buffalo Memorial Auditorium, Buffalo, New York
Attendance: 12,079

April 28

Boxscore

Boston Celtics 122, Buffalo Braves 124
Scoring by quarter: 34–39, 34–28, 20–27, 34–30
Pts: Dave Cowens 29; Rebs: Dave Cowens 26; Asts: Jo Jo White 11	Pts: Bob McAdoo 30; Rebs: Bob McAdoo 17; Asts: Randy Smith 10
Series tied, 2–2

Buffalo Memorial Auditorium, Buffalo, New York
Attendance: 16,193

April 30

Boxscore

Buffalo Braves 88, Boston Celtics 99
Scoring by quarter: 17–20, 19–26, 29–30, 23–23
Pts: Bob McAdoo 23; Rebs: Bob McAdoo 14; Asts: Ernie DiGregorio 6	Pts: Dave Cowens 30; Rebs: Paul Silas 22; Asts: Jo Jo White 6
Boston leads series, 3–2

Boston Garden, Boston, Massachusetts
Attendance: 15,320

May 2

Boxscore

Boston Celtics 104, Buffalo Braves 100
Scoring by quarter: 30–27, 20–28, 27–23, 27–22
Pts: Jo Jo White 23; Rebs: Paul Silas 18; Asts: Charlie Scott 8	Pts: Bob McAdoo 28; Rebs: John Shumate 16; Asts: Ernie DiGregorio 8
Boston wins series, 4–2

Buffalo Memorial Auditorium, Buffalo, New York
Attendance: 16,261

This was the second playoff meeting between these two teams, with the Celtics winning the first meeting.

Previous playoff series
Boston leads 1–0 in all-time playoff series

1974

Boston Celtics 4, Buffalo Braves 2

1974 Eastern Conference Semifinals

==== (2) Cleveland Cavaliers vs. (3) Washington Bullets ====
April 13

Boxscore

Washington Bullets 100, Cleveland Cavaliers 95
Scoring by quarter: 37–19, 19–16, 22–25, 22–35
Pts: Elvin Hayes 28; Rebs: Elvin Hayes 18; Asts: Dave Bing 5	Pts: Jim Chones 23; Rebs: Campy Russell 11; Asts: Jim Cleamons 8
Washington leads series, 1–0

Richfield Coliseum, Richfield, Ohio
Attendance: 19,974

April 15

Boxscore

Cleveland Cavaliers 80, Washington Bullets 79
Scoring by quarter: 24–24, 12–22, 27–17, 17–16
Pts: Bingo Smith 17; Rebs: Nate Thurmond 10; Asts: Bingo Smith 4	Pts: Phil Chenier 19; Rebs: Unseld, Robinson 13 each Asts: Dave Bing 7
Series tied, 1–1

Capital Centre, Landover, Maryland
Attendance: 17,988

- Bingo Smith hits game winning jumper to tie series.

April 17

Boxscore

Washington Bullets 76, Cleveland Cavaliers 88
Scoring by quarter: 15–21, 22–24, 17–22, 22–21
Pts: Elvin Hayes 17; Rebs: Wes Unseld 13; Asts: four players 3 each	Pts: Smith, Carr 17 each Rebs: Jim Brewer 12; Asts: Jim Brewer 6
Cleveland leads series, 2–1

Richfield Coliseum, Richfield, Ohio
Attendance: 21,061

April 21

Boxscore

Cleveland Cavaliers 98, Washington Bullets 109
Scoring by quarter: 29–26, 22–25, 19–27, 28–31
Pts: Campy Russell 22; Rebs: Jim Brewer 10; Asts: Foots Walker 6	Pts: Clem Haskins 22; Rebs: Unseld, Hayes 14 each Asts: Wes Unseld 7
Series tied, 2–2

Capital Centre, Landover, Maryland
Attendance: 17,542

April 22

Boxscore

Washington Bullets 91, Cleveland Cavaliers 92
Scoring by quarter: 23–23, 26–25, 22–28, 20–16
Pts: Elvin Hayes 25; Rebs: Elvin Hayes 13; Asts: Dave Bing 6	Pts: Dick Snyder 26; Rebs: Jim Brewer 12; Asts: Cleamons, Snyder 4 each
Cleveland leads series, 3–2

Richfield Coliseum, Richfield, Ohio
Attendance: 21,312

- Jim Cleamons hits game-winning tip-in.

April 26

Boxscore

Cleveland Cavaliers 98, Washington Bullets 102 (OT)
Scoring by quarter: 19–30, 25–19, 21–22, 23–17, Overtime: 10–14
Pts: Austin Carr 27; Rebs: Jim Brewer 12; Asts: Cleamons, Carr 5 each	Pts: Elvin Hayes 28; Rebs: Wes Unseld 18; Asts: Wes Unseld 8
Series tied, 3–3

Capital Centre, Landover, Maryland
Attendance: 19,035

April 29

Boxscore

Washington Bullets 85, Cleveland Cavaliers 87
Scoring by quarter: 26–29, 21–19, 24–21, 14–18
Pts: Phil Chenier 31; Rebs: Elvin Hayes 11; Asts: Wes Unseld 4	Pts: Dick Snyder 23; Rebs: Jim Brewer 16; Asts: Jim Cleamons 6
Cleveland wins series, 4–3

Richfield Coliseum, Richfield, Ohio
Attendance: 21,564

- Dick Snyder hits the series-winning shot with 4 seconds left.

This was the first playoff meeting between these two teams.

=== Western Conference semifinals ===
==== (1) Golden State Warriors vs. (5) Detroit Pistons ====
April 20

Boxscore

Detroit Pistons 103, Golden State Warriors 127
Scoring by quarter: 31–34, 20–31, 24–27, 28–35
Pts: Bob Lanier 18; Rebs: Bob Lanier 16; Asts: Chris Ford 7	Pts: Phil Smith 26; Rebs: Clifford Ray 12; Asts: Rick Barry 14
Golden State leads series, 1–0

Oakland–Alameda County Coliseum Arena, Oakland, California
Attendance: 13,067

April 22

Boxscore

Detroit Pistons 123, Golden State Warriors 111
Scoring by quarter: 39–37, 31–29, 29–18, 24–27
Pts: Curtis Rowe 33; Rebs: Curtis Rowe 10; Asts: Chris Ford 9	Pts: Rick Barry 27; Rebs: Clifford Ray 12; Asts: Rick Barry 8
Series tied, 1–1

Oakland–Alameda County Coliseum Arena, Oakland, California
Attendance: 13,067

April 24

Boxscore

Golden State Warriors 113, Detroit Pistons 96
Scoring by quarter: 25–26, 28–22, 31–27, 29–21
Pts: Phil Smith 34; Rebs: Jamaal Wilkes 18; Asts: Rick Barry 10	Pts: Bob Lanier 23; Rebs: Bob Lanier 16; Asts: Eric Money 8
Golden State leads series, 2–1

Cobo Arena, Detroit, Michigan
Attendance: 10,022

April 26

Boxscore

Golden State Warriors 102, Detroit Pistons 106
Scoring by quarter: 31–28, 17–25, 21–32, 33–21
Pts: Phil Smith 31; Rebs: Clifford Ray 8 Asts: Rick Barry 6	Pts: Bob Lanier 30; Rebs: Bob Lanier 11; Asts: Eric Money 7
Series tied, 2–2

Cobo Arena, Detroit, Michigan
Attendance: 11,389

April 28

Boxscore

Detroit Pistons 109, Golden State Warriors 128
Scoring by quarter: 22–28, 26–32, 32–33, 29–35
Pts: Howard Porter 20; Rebs: Bob Lanier 12; Asts: Archie Clark 5	Pts: Phil Smith 28; Rebs: Clifford Ray 14; Asts: Rick Barry 11
Golden State leads series, 3–2

Oakland–Alameda County Coliseum Arena, Oakland, California
Attendance: 13,067

April 30

Boxscore

Golden State Warriors 118, Detroit Pistons 116 (OT)
Scoring by quarter: 30–31, 25–32, 27–22, 28–25, Overtime: 8–6
Pts: Phil Smith 37; Rebs: three players 8 each Asts: Phil Smith 7	Pts: Bob Lanier 30; Rebs: Bob Lanier 16; Asts: Eric Money 9
Golden State wins series, 4–2

Cobo Arena, Detroit, Michigan
Attendance: 10,361

This was the second playoff meeting between these two teams, with the Warriors winning the only meeting when both teams were based in Philadelphia and Fort Wayne respectively.

Previous playoff series
Golden State/ Philadelphia leads 1–0 in all-time playoff series

1956

Fort Wayne Pistons 1, Philadelphia Warriors 4

1956 NBA Finals

==== (2) Seattle SuperSonics vs. (3) Phoenix Suns ====
April 13

Boxscore

Phoenix Suns 99, Seattle SuperSonics 102
Scoring by quarter: 21–29, 26–22, 26–28, 26–23
Pts: Paul Westphal 24; Rebs: Gar Heard 10; Asts: Paul Westphal 10	Pts: Fred Brown 34; Rebs: Fred Brown 7 Asts: Slick Watts 8
Seattle leads series, 1–0

Seattle Center Coliseum, Seattle, Washington
Attendance: 12,408

April 15

Boxscore

Phoenix Suns 116, Seattle SuperSonics 111
Scoring by quarter: 30–29, 35–28, 22–29, 29–25
Pts: Alvan Adams 23; Rebs: Curtis Perry 12; Asts: Alvan Adams 7	Pts: Fred Brown 45; Rebs: Tommy Burleson 12; Asts: Slick Watts 6
Series tied, 1–1

Seattle Center Coliseum, Seattle, Washington
Attendance: 14,096

April 18

Boxscore

Seattle SuperSonics 91, Phoenix Suns 103
Scoring by quarter: 16–27, 31–24, 14–27, 30–25
Pts: Slick Watts 18; Rebs: three players 8 each Asts: Slick Watts 7	Pts: Heard, Westphal 16 each Rebs: Gar Heard 14; Asts: Westphal, Adams 6 each
Phoenix leads series, 2–1

Arizona Veterans Memorial Coliseum, Phoenix, Arizona
Attendance: 13,036

April 20

Boxscore

Seattle SuperSonics 114, Phoenix Suns 130
Scoring by quarter: 26–31, 21–29, 25–30, 42–40
Pts: Fred Brown 33; Rebs: Tommy Burleson 20; Asts: Herm Gilliam 7	Pts: Paul Westphal 39; Rebs: Gar Heard 11; Asts: Ricky Sobers 8
Phoenix leads series, 3–1

Arizona Veterans Memorial Coliseum, Phoenix, Arizona
Attendance: 13,036

April 25

Boxscore

Phoenix Suns 108, Seattle SuperSonics 114
Scoring by quarter: 23–28, 27–28, 30–30, 28–28
Pts: Paul Westphal 27; Rebs: Dennis Awtrey 12; Asts: three players 4 each	Pts: Bruce Seals 28; Rebs: Willie Norwood 13; Asts: Slick Watts 12
Phoenix leads series, 3–2

Seattle Center Coliseum, Seattle, Washington
Attendance: 14,096

April 27

Boxscore

Seattle SuperSonics 112, Phoenix Suns 123
Scoring by quarter: 23–25, 27–35, 24–34, 38–29
Pts: Seals, Watts 24 each Rebs: Bruce Seals 7 Asts: Slick Watts 11	Pts: Keith Erickson 20; Rebs: Heard, Adams 9 each Asts: Alvan Adams 10
Phoenix wins series, 4–2

Arizona Veterans Memorial Coliseum, Phoenix, Arizona
Attendance: 13,192

This was the first playoff meeting between these two teams.

== Conference finals ==
=== Eastern Conference finals ===
==== (1) Boston Celtics vs. (2) Cleveland Cavaliers ====
May 6

Boxscore

Cleveland Cavaliers 99, Boston Celtics 111
Scoring by quarter: 20–32, 28–25, 29–20, 22–34
Pts: Snyder, Russell 21 each Rebs: Nate Thurmond 16; Asts: Jim Cleamons 6	Pts: John Havlicek 26; Rebs: Dave Cowens 12; Asts: Dave Cowens 7
Boston leads series, 1–0

Boston Garden, Boston, Massachusetts
Attendance: 14,264

May 9

Boxscore

Cleveland Cavaliers 89, Boston Celtics 94
Scoring by quarter: 19–24, 29–20, 23–24, 18–26
Pts: Snyder, Smith 16 each Rebs: Jim Brewer 9 Asts: Foots Walker 6	Pts: Jo Jo White 24; Rebs: Paul Silas 19; Asts: three players 4 each
Boston leads series, 2–0

Boston Garden, Boston, Massachusetts
Attendance: 12,098

May 11

Boxscore

Boston Celtics 78, Cleveland Cavaliers 83
Scoring by quarter: 16–16, 22–27, 16–15, 24–25
Pts: Jo Jo White 22; Rebs: Paul Silas 21; Asts: Jo Jo White 7	Pts: Jim Cleamons 18; Rebs: Jim Brewer 15; Asts: Nate Thurmond 6
Boston leads series, 2–1

Richfield Coliseum, Richfield, Ohio
Attendance: 21,564

May 14

Boxscore

Boston Celtics 87, Cleveland Cavaliers 106
Scoring by quarter: 23–27, 28–22, 19–24, 17–33
Pts: Jo Jo White 23; Rebs: Dave Cowens 18; Asts: Dave Cowens 4	Pts: Bingo Smith 27; Rebs: Jim Brewer 11; Asts: Jim Cleamons 8
Series tied, 2–2

Richfield Coliseum, Richfield, Ohio
Attendance: 21,564

May 16

Boxscore

Cleveland Cavaliers 94, Boston Celtics 99
Scoring by quarter: 23–22, 19–20, 22–26, 30–31
Pts: Jim Cleamons 18; Rebs: Nate Thurmond 10; Asts: Cleamons, Smith 4 each	Pts: Dave Cowens 26; Rebs: Paul Silas 13; Asts: Dave Cowens 6
Boston leads series, 3–2

Boston Garden, Boston, Massachusetts
Attendance: 12,951

May 18

Boxscore

Boston Celtics 94, Cleveland Cavaliers 87
Scoring by quarter: 22–19, 21–27, 24–23, 27–18
Pts: Jo Jo White 29; Rebs: Dave Cowens 18; Asts: White, Cowens 5 each	Pts: Austin Carr 26; Rebs: Nate Thurmond 14; Asts: Thurmond, Cleamons 5 each
Boston wins series, 4–2

Richfield Coliseum, Richfield, Ohio
Attendance: 21,564

This was the first playoff meeting between these two teams.

=== Western Conference finals ===
==== (1) Golden State Warriors vs. (3) Phoenix Suns ====
May 2

Boxscore

Phoenix Suns 103, Golden State Warriors 128
Scoring by quarter: 28–30, 20–28, 24–31, 31–39
Pts: Curtis Perry 22; Rebs: Alvan Adams 14; Asts: Alvan Adams 6	Pts: Rick Barry 38; Rebs: Clifford Ray 11; Asts: Gus Williams 6
Golden State leads series, 1–0

Oakland–Alameda County Coliseum Arena, Oakland, California
Attendance: 12,475

May 5

Boxscore

Phoenix Suns 108, Golden State Warriors 101
Scoring by quarter: 28–26, 18–18, 35–29, 27–28
Pts: Paul Westphal 31; Rebs: Gar Heard 12; Asts: Alvan Adams 9	Pts: Rick Barry 44; Rebs: George Johnson 11; Asts: Rick Barry 4
Series tied, 1–1

Oakland–Alameda County Coliseum Arena, Oakland, California
Attendance: 13,067

May 7

Boxscore

Golden State Warriors 99, Phoenix Suns 91
Scoring by quarter: 24–22, 24–31, 26–18, 25–20
Pts: Jamaal Wilkes 22; Rebs: Rick Barry 7 Asts: Barry, Smith 6 each	Pts: Paul Westphal 24; Rebs: Alvan Adams 14; Asts: Ricky Sobers 6
Golden State leads series, 2–1

Arizona Veterans Memorial Coliseum, Phoenix, Arizona
Attendance: 13,306

May 9

Boxscore

Golden State Warriors 129, Phoenix Suns 133 (2OT)
Scoring by quarter: 30–36, 33–29, 24–26, 25–21, Overtime: 7–7, 10–14
Pts: Phil Smith 30; Rebs: Jamaal Wilkes 14; Asts: Phil Smith 8	Pts: Keith Erickson 28; Rebs: Gar Heard 18; Asts: Paul Westphal 8
Series tied, 2–2

Arizona Veterans Memorial Coliseum, Phoenix, Arizona
Attendance: 12,884

May 12

Boxscore

Phoenix Suns 95, Golden State Warriors 111
Scoring by quarter: 24–40, 26–29, 22–15, 23–27
Pts: Curtis Perry 23; Rebs: Curtis Perry 18; Asts: Westphal, Sobers 4 each	Pts: Phil Smith 25; Rebs: Clifford Ray 16; Asts: Phil Smith 6
Golden State leads series, 3–2

Oakland–Alameda County Coliseum Arena, Oakland, California
Attendance: 13,067

May 14

Boxscore

Golden State Warriors 104, Phoenix Suns 105
Scoring by quarter: 26–28, 31–26, 21–31, 26–20
Pts: Rick Barry 30; Rebs: Clifford Ray 12; Asts: Barry, Smith 6 each	Pts: Ricky Sobers 21; Rebs: Gar Heard 15; Asts: three players 6 each
Series tied, 3–3

Arizona Veterans Memorial Coliseum, Phoenix, Arizona
Attendance: 13,396

May 16

Boxscore

Phoenix Suns 94, Golden State Warriors 86
Scoring by quarter: 22–26, 20–22, 25–17, 27–21
Pts: Gar Heard 21; Rebs: Alvan Adams 20; Asts: Westphal, Perry 4 each	Pts: Rick Barry 20; Rebs: Wilkes, Ray 13 each Asts: Phil Smith 6
Phoenix wins series, 4–3

Oakland–Alameda County Coliseum Arena, Oakland, California
Attendance: 13,067

This was the first playoff meeting between these two teams.

== NBA Finals: (E1) Boston Celtics vs. (W3) Phoenix Suns ==
May 23

Boxscore

Phoenix Suns 87, Boston Celtics 98
Scoring by quarter: 20–22, 19–22, 27–27, 21–27
Pts: Alvan Adams 26; Rebs: Curtis Perry 10; Asts: Ricky Sobers 7	Pts: Dave Cowens 25; Rebs: Dave Cowens 21; Asts: Dave Cowens 10
Boston leads series, 1–0

Boston Garden, Boston, Massachusetts
Attendance: 15,320
Referees: Darell Garretson, Jake O'Donnell

May 27

Boxscore

Phoenix Suns 90, Boston Celtics 105
Scoring by quarter: 25–24, 16–22, 16–34, 33–25
Pts: Paul Westphal 28; Rebs: Alvan Adams 15; Asts: Westphal, Adams 5 each	Pts: John Havlicek 23; Rebs: Paul Silas 17; Asts: Jo Jo White 9
Boston leads series, 2–0

Boston Garden, Boston, Massachusetts
Attendance: 15,320
Referees: Earl Strom, Joe Gushue

May 30

Boxscore

Boston Celtics 98, Phoenix Suns 105
Scoring by quarter: 17–26, 22–26, 26–26, 33–27
Pts: Jo Jo White 24; Rebs: Dave Cowens 17; Asts: Charlie Scott 5	Pts: Alvan Adams 33; Rebs: Alvan Adams 14; Asts: Paul Westphal 6
Boston leads series, 2–1

Arizona Veterans Memorial Coliseum, Phoenix, Arizona
Attendance: 12,884
Referees: Richie Powers, Paul Mihalak

June 2

Boxscore

Boston Celtics 107, Phoenix Suns 109
Scoring by quarter: 30–35, 27–25, 23–27, 27–22
Pts: Jo Jo White 25; Rebs: Paul Silas 14; Asts: Jo Jo White 5	Pts: Paul Westphal 28; Rebs: Gar Heard 15; Asts: Paul Westphal 9
Series tied, 2–2

Arizona Veterans Memorial Coliseum, Phoenix, Arizona
Attendance: 13,306
Referees: Don Murphy, Manny Sokol

June 4

Boxscore

Phoenix Suns 126, Boston Celtics 128 (3OT)
Scoring by quarter: 18–36, 27–25, 27–16, 23–18, Overtime: 6–6, 11–11, 14–16
Pts: Westphal, Sobers 25 each Rebs: Curtis Perry 15; Asts: Perry, Sobers 6 each	Pts: Jo Jo White 33; Rebs: Dave Cowens 19; Asts: Jo Jo White 9
Boston leads series, 3–2

Boston Garden, Boston, Massachusetts
Attendance: 15,320
Referees: Richie Powers, Don Murphy, Bob Rakel

- As John Havlicek hit the clutch shot as time ran out for Boston in the second OT, the fans crowded the floor in celebration, thinking that the game was over. However, the clock was supposed to stop on the basket, and the referees had to bring the Celtics back onto the floor and put one second back on the clock. Meanwhile, Paul Westphal called a timeout that the Suns didn't have which would result in a technical foul, forcing Jo Jo White to shoot and make the technical free throw which put the Celtics up by 2, and then Gar Heard hit the game-tying buzzer-beater to force the third OT.

June 6

Boxscore

Boston Celtics 87, Phoenix Suns 80
Scoring by quarter: 20–20, 18–13, 19–23, 30–24
Pts: Charlie Scott 25; Rebs: Dave Cowens 17; Asts: Jo Jo White 6	Pts: Alvan Adams 20; Rebs: Gar Heard 10; Asts: Alvan Adams 6
Boston wins series, 4–2

Arizona Veterans Memorial Coliseum, Phoenix, Arizona
Attendance: 13,306
Referees: Darell Garretson, Jake O'Donnell

This was the first playoff meeting between these two teams.
