= 1975–76 Washington Bullets season =

NBA professional basketball team season

- Head coach: K. C. Jones
- General manager: Bob Ferry
- Owner: Abe Pollin
- Arena: Capital Centre

Results
- Record: 48–34 (.585)
- Place: Division: 2nd (Central); Conference: 3rd (Eastern)
- Playoff finish: Conference semifinals (lost to Cavaliers 3–4)
- Stats at Basketball Reference

Local media
- Television: WDCA
- Radio: WTOP

The 1975–76 Washington Bullets season was the Bullets 15th season in the NBA and their 3rd season in the city of Washington, D.C.

== Roster ==
1975–76 Washington Bullets roster
Players

Pos.	No.	Player	Height	Weight	DOB	From
G	21	Dave Bing	6 ft 3 in (1.91 m)	180 lb (82 kg)		Syracuse
G	45	Phil Chenier	6 ft 3 in (1.91 m)	180 lb (82 kg)		California
F	35	Kevin Grevey	6 ft 5 in (1.96 m)	210 lb (95 kg)		Kentucky
G	14	Clem Haskins	6 ft 3 in (1.91 m)	195 lb (88 kg)		Western Kentucky
C	11	Elvin Hayes	6 ft 9 in (2.06 m)	235 lb (107 kg)		Houston
PF	22	Tom Kozelko	6 ft 8 in (2.03 m)	220 lb (100 kg)		Toledo
SG	24	Tom Kropp	6 ft 3 in (1.91 m)	205 lb (93 kg)		Nebraska–Kearney
SG	6	Mike Riordan	6 ft 4 in (1.93 m)	200 lb (91 kg)		Providence
F	33	Leonard Robinson	6 ft 7 in (2.01 m)	225 lb (102 kg)		Tennessee State
F	41	Wes Unseld	6 ft 7 in (2.01 m)	245 lb (111 kg)		Louisville
F	12	Nick Weatherspoon	6 ft 7 in (2.01 m)	197 lb (89 kg)		Illinois

Coaches
Head coach
- K. C. Jones

Legend
- (DP) Unsigned draft pick
- (FA) Free agent
- (S) Suspended
- Injured

== Regular season ==
=== Season standings ===
Central Division	W	L	PCT	GB	Home	Road	Div
y-Cleveland Cavaliers	49	33	.598	–	29–12	20–21	15–11
x-Washington Bullets	48	34	.585	1	31–10	17–24	14–12
Houston Rockets	40	42	.488	9	27–13	13–29	14–12
New Orleans Jazz	38	44	.463	11	22–19	16–25	15–11
Atlanta Hawks	29	53	.354	20	20–21	9–32	7–19

#	Eastern Conference				
#	Team	W	L	PCT	GB
1	z-Boston Celtics	54	28	.659	–
2	y-Cleveland Cavaliers	49	33	.598	5
3	x-Washington Bullets	48	34	.585	6
4	x-Philadelphia 76ers	46	36	.561	8
5	x-Buffalo Braves	46	36	.561	8
6	Houston Rockets	40	42	.488	14
7	New York Knicks	38	44	.463	16
8	New Orleans Jazz	38	44	.463	16
9	Atlanta Hawks	29	53	.354	25

Notes

- z, y – division champions
- x – clinched playoff spot

== Game log ==
=== Regular season ===
1975–76 game log
Total: 48–34 (home: 24–17; road: 15–26)
October: 1–0 (home: 1–0; road: 0–0)

Game	Date	Team	Score	High points	High rebounds	High assists	Location Attendance	Record

November : 6–8 (home: 4–4; road: 2–4)

Game	Date	Team	Score	High points	High rebounds	High assists	Location Attendance	Record
8	November 13	Boston	W 110–107				Capital Centre	6–2

December : 9–7 (home: 6–1; road: 3–6)

Game	Date	Team	Score	High points	High rebounds	High assists	Location Attendance	Record
21	December 12	@ Boston	L 108–130				Boston Garden	11–10

January : 11–6 (home: 7–1; road: 4–5)

Game	Date	Team	Score	High points	High rebounds	High assists	Location Attendance	Record
36	January 9	@ Boston	L 113–118				Boston Garden	20–16

February : 11–4 (home: 7–0; road: 4–4)

Game	Date	Team	Score	High points	High rebounds	High assists	Location Attendance	Record
All-Star Break

March : 8–6 (home: 6–2; road: 2–4)

Game	Date	Team	Score	High points	High rebounds	High assists	Location Attendance	Record
68	March 14	@ Boston	W 102–89				Boston Garden	42–26

April : 2–3 (home: 0–2; road: 2–1)

Game	Date	Team	Score	High points	High rebounds	High assists	Location Attendance	Record
82	April 11	Boston	L 99–103				Capital Centre	48–34

1975–76 schedule

=== Playoffs ===
1976 playoff game log
Eastern Conference Semifinals: 3–4 (home: 2–1; road: 1–3)

Game	Date	Team	Score	High points	High rebounds	High assists	Location Attendance	Series
1	April 13	@ Cleveland	W 100–95	Elvin Hayes (28)	Elvin Hayes (18)	Dave Bing (5)	Richfield Coliseum; 19,974	1–0
2	April 15	Cleveland	L 79–80	Phil Chenier (19)	Unseld, Robinson (13)	Dave Bing (7)	Capital Centre; 17,988	1–1
3	April 17	@ Cleveland	L 76–88	Elvin Hayes (17)	Wes Unseld (13)	four players tied (3)	Richfield Coliseum; 21,061	1–2
4	April 21	Cleveland	W 109–98	Clem Haskins (22)	Unseld, Hayes (14)	Wes Unseld (7)	Capital Centre; 17,542	2–2
5	April 22	@ Cleveland	L 91–92	Elvin Hayes (25)	Elvin Hayes (13)	Dave Bing (6)	Richfield Coliseum; 21,312	2–3
6	April 26	Cleveland	W 102–98 (OT)	Elvin Hayes (28)	Wes Unseld (18)	Wes Unseld (8)	Capital Centre; 19,035	3–3
7	April 29	@ Cleveland	L 85–87	Phil Chenier (31)	Elvin Hayes (11)	Wes Unseld (4)	Richfield Coliseum; 21,564	3–4

1976 schedule

== Awards and records ==
- Elvin Hayes, All-NBA Second Team
