= 1975–76 Atlanta Hawks season =

Season of National Basketball Association team the Atlanta Hawks

- Head coach: Cotton Fitzsimmons; Bumper Tormohlen
- Arena: Omni Coliseum

Results
- Record: 29–53 (.354)
- Place: Division: 5th (Central); Conference: 9th (Eastern)
- Playoff finish: Did not qualify
- Stats at Basketball Reference

Local media
- Television: WTCG
- Radio: WSB

The 1975–76 Atlanta Hawks season was the Hawks' 27th season in the NBA and eighth season in Atlanta.

== Roster ==
1975–76 Atlanta Hawks roster
Players

Pos.	No.	Player	Height	Weight	DOB	From
F	50	John Brown	6 ft 7 in (2.01 m)	220 lb (100 kg)		Missouri
G	22	John Drew	6 ft 6 in (1.98 m)	205 lb (93 kg)		Gardner–Webb
F/C	42	Connie Hawkins	6 ft 8 in (2.03 m)	210 lb (95 kg)		Iowa
G	20	Wilbur Holland	6 ft 0 in (1.83 m)	175 lb (79 kg)		New Orleans
G/F	23	Lou Hudson	6 ft 5 in (1.96 m)	210 lb (95 kg)		Minnesota
C	13	Dwight Jones	6 ft 10 in (2.08 m)	210 lb (95 kg)		Houston
G	7	Dean Meminger	6 ft 0 in (1.83 m)	175 lb (79 kg)		Marquette
C	40	Mike Sojourner	6 ft 9 in (2.06 m)	225 lb (102 kg)		Utah
G/F	5	Tom Van Arsdale	6 ft 5 in (1.96 m)	202 lb (92 kg)		Indiana

Coaches
Head coach
- Bumper Tormohlen

Legend
- (DP) Unsigned draft pick
- (FA) Free agent
- (S) Suspended
- Injured

== Regular season ==
=== Season standings ===
Central Division	W	L	PCT	GB	Home	Road	Div
y-Cleveland Cavaliers	49	33	.598	–	29–12	20–21	15–11
x-Washington Bullets	48	34	.585	1	31–10	17–24	14–12
Houston Rockets	40	42	.488	9	27–13	13–29	14–12
New Orleans Jazz	38	44	.463	11	22–19	16–25	15–11
Atlanta Hawks	29	53	.354	20	20–21	9–32	7–19

#	Eastern Conference				
#	Team	W	L	PCT	GB
1	z-Boston Celtics	54	28	.659	–
2	y-Cleveland Cavaliers	49	33	.598	5
3	x-Washington Bullets	48	34	.585	6
4	x-Philadelphia 76ers	46	36	.561	8
5	x-Buffalo Braves	46	36	.561	8
6	Houston Rockets	40	42	.488	14
7	New York Knicks	38	44	.463	16
8	New Orleans Jazz	38	44	.463	16
9	Atlanta Hawks	29	53	.354	25

z – clinched division title
y – clinched division title
x – clinched playoff spot
