= Ed Searcy =

American basketball player (born 1952)

Personal information
- Born: April 17, 1952 New York City, New York, U.S.
- Listed height: 6 ft 6 in (1.98 m)
- Listed weight: 210 lb (95 kg)

Career information
- High school: Power Memorial Academy (New York City, New York)
- College: St. John's (1971–1974)
- NBA draft: 1974: 5th round, 82nd overall pick
- Drafted by: New Orleans Jazz
- Playing career: 1975–1976
- Position: Small forward
- Number: 32

Career history
- 1975: Boston Celtics
- Stats at NBA.com
- Stats at Basketball Reference

Edwin Searcy (born April 17, 1952) is an American former professional basketball player.

== Professional career ==
Searcy was drafted by the New Orleans Jazz with the 82nd overall pick in the 1974 NBA Draft. However, he was later waived by the Jazz on October 3, 1974.

On Sep 1, 1975, he signed with the Boston Celtics. With the appeared in 4 games 1.5 points and he was waived Celtics On Dec 11, 1975.

On Sep 1, 1976, he resigned with the Boston Celtics. but he was later waived on Oct 5, 1976.

== Career statistics ==
Legend
GP	Games played	GS	Games started	MPG	Minutes per game
FG%	Field goal percentage	3P%	3-point field goal percentage	FT%	Free throw percentage
RPG	Rebounds per game	APG	Assists per game	SPG	Steals per game
BPG	Blocks per game	PPG	Points per game	**Bold**	Career high

=== NBA ===
==== Regular season ====
Year	Team	GP	MPG	FG%	FT%	RPG	APG	SPG	BPG	PPG
1975–76	Boston	4	3.0	.333	1.000	.0	.3	.0	.0	1.5
