= 1975–76 Houston Rockets season =

- Head coach: Johnny Egan
- General manager: Ray Patterson
- Owners: James Talcott Incorporated
- Arena: The Summit

Results
- Record: 40–42 (.488)
- Place: Division: 3rd (Central); Conference: 6th (Eastern)
- Playoff finish: Did not qualify
- Stats at Basketball Reference

Local media
- Television: KHTV
- Radio: KPRC

The 1975–76 Houston Rockets season was the Rockets' 9th season in the NBA and 5th season in the city of Houston as well as their first season at The Summit.

== Roster ==
1975–76 Houston Rockets roster
Players

| Pos. | No. | Player | Height | Weight | DOB | From |
|---|---|---|---|---|---|---|
| SG | 22 | Gus Bailey | 6 ft 5 in (1.96 m) | 185 lb (84 kg) | 1951-02-18 | UTEP |
| SF | 34 | John Johnson | 6 ft 7 in (2.01 m) | 200 lb (91 kg) | 1947-10-18 | Iowa |
| C | 44 | Kevin Kunnert | 6 ft 9 in (2.06 m) | 230 lb (104 kg) | 1951-11-11 | Iowa |
| C | 50 | Joe C. Meriweather | 6 ft 10 in (2.08 m) | 215 lb (98 kg) | 1953-10-26 | Southern Illinois |
| PG | 23 | Calvin Murphy | 5 ft 9 in (1.75 m) | 165 lb (75 kg) | 1948-05-09 | Niagara |
| SG | 14 | Mike Newlin | 6 ft 4 in (1.93 m) | 200 lb (91 kg) | 1949-01-02 | Utah |
| SF | 42 | Ed Ratleff | 6 ft 6 in (1.98 m) | 195 lb (88 kg) | 1950-03-29 | Long Beach State |
| PF | 31 | Ron Riley | 6 ft 8 in (2.03 m) | 195 lb (88 kg) | 1950-11-11 | USC |
| PF | 45 | Rudy Tomjanovich | 6 ft 8 in (2.03 m) | 218 lb (99 kg) | 1948-11-24 | Michigan |
| SG | 32 | Rudy White | 6 ft 2 in (1.88 m) | 195 lb (88 kg) | 1953-06-23 | Arizona State |
| PG | 11 | Dave Wohl | 6 ft 2 in (1.88 m) | 185 lb (84 kg) | 1949-11-02 | Penn |

Coaches
Head coach
- Johnny Egan
Assistant(s)
- Larry Siegfried

Legend
- (DP) Unsigned draft pick
- (FA) Free agent
- (S) Suspended
- Injured

Roster
Updated: November 27, 1975

== Regular season ==
=== Season standings ===
| Central Division | W | L | PCT | GB | Home | Road | Div |
|---|---|---|---|---|---|---|---|
| y-Cleveland Cavaliers | 49 | 33 | .598 | – | 29–12 | 20–21 | 15–11 |
| x-Washington Bullets | 48 | 34 | .585 | 1 | 31–10 | 17–24 | 14–12 |
| Houston Rockets | 40 | 42 | .488 | 9 | 27–13 | 13–29 | 14–12 |
| New Orleans Jazz | 38 | 44 | .463 | 11 | 22–19 | 16–25 | 15–11 |
| Atlanta Hawks | 29 | 53 | .354 | 20 | 20–21 | 9–32 | 7–19 |

| # | Eastern Conference | | | | |
| # | Team | W | L | PCT | GB |
|---|---|---|---|---|---|
| 1 | z-Boston Celtics | 54 | 28 | .659 | – |
| 2 | y-Cleveland Cavaliers | 49 | 33 | .598 | 5 |
| 3 | x-Washington Bullets | 48 | 34 | .585 | 6 |
| 4 | x-Philadelphia 76ers | 46 | 36 | .561 | 8 |
| 5 | x-Buffalo Braves | 46 | 36 | .561 | 8 |
| 6 | Houston Rockets | 40 | 42 | .488 | 14 |
| 7 | New York Knicks | 38 | 44 | .463 | 16 |
| 8 | New Orleans Jazz | 38 | 44 | .463 | 16 |
| 9 | Atlanta Hawks | 29 | 53 | .354 | 25 |

== Awards and records ==
- Joe Meriweather, NBA All-Rookie Team 1st Team
