= 1975–76 Cleveland Cavaliers season =

NBA professional basketball team season

- Division champions
- Head coach: Bill Fitch
- Arena: Coliseum at Richfield

Results
- Record: 49–33 (.598)
- Place: Division: 1st (Central); Conference: 2nd (Eastern)
- Playoff finish: East Conference Finals (eliminated 2–4)
- Stats at Basketball Reference

Local media
- Television: WEWS-TV
- Radio: WWWE

The 1975–76 Cleveland Cavaliers season was the sixth season of the franchise in the National Basketball Association (NBA). This season marked their first winning record, their first division title, their first playoff appearance and their first conference finals in history. The season is referred to as the "Miracle at Richfield" season for this reason, and helped propel local interest in the Cavaliers as almost every playoff game was sold out and regular game attendance would rise in the coming seasons.

== Roster ==
1975–76 Cleveland Cavaliers roster
Players

Pos.	No.	Player	Height	Weight	DOB	From
PF	52	Jim Brewer	6 ft 9 in (2.06 m)	210 lb (95 kg)	1951-12-03	Minnesota
SG	34	Austin Carr	6 ft 4 in (1.93 m)	200 lb (91 kg)	1948-03-10	Notre Dame
F/C	22	Jim Chones	6 ft 11 in (2.11 m)	220 lb (100 kg)	1949-11-30	Marquette
PG	35	Jim Cleamons	6 ft 3 in (1.91 m)	185 lb (84 kg)	1949-09-13	Ohio State
SF	23	Rowland Garrett	6 ft 6 in (1.98 m)	210 lb (95 kg)	1950-07-16	Florida State
PF	24	John Lambert	6 ft 10 in (2.08 m)	225 lb (102 kg)	1953-01-14	USC
SF	20	Campy Russell	6 ft 8 in (2.03 m)	215 lb (98 kg)	1952-01-12	Michigan
G/F	7	Bingo Smith	6 ft 5 in (1.96 m)	195 lb (88 kg)	1946-02-26	Tulsa
G/F	10	Dick Snyder	6 ft 5 in (1.96 m)	207 lb (94 kg)	1944-02-01	Davidson
C	42	Nate Thurmond	6 ft 11 in (2.11 m)	225 lb (102 kg)	1941-07-25	Bowling Green
PG	14	Foots Walker	6 ft 0 in (1.83 m)	184 lb (83 kg)	1951-05-21	West Georgia
C	44	Luke Witte	7 ft 0 in (2.13 m)	230 lb (104 kg)	1950-10-19	Ohio State

Coaches
Head coach
- Bill Fitch
Assistant(s)
- Jimmy Rodgers

Legend
- (DP) Unsigned draft pick
- (FA) Free agent
- (S) Suspended
- Injured

Roster

== Season standings ==
Central Division	W	L	PCT	GB	Home	Road	Div
y-Cleveland Cavaliers	49	33	.598	–	29–12	20–21	15–11
x-Washington Bullets	48	34	.585	1	31–10	17–24	14–12
Houston Rockets	40	42	.488	9	27–13	13–29	14–12
New Orleans Jazz	38	44	.463	11	22–19	16–25	15–11
Atlanta Hawks	29	53	.354	20	20–21	9–32	7–19

#	Eastern Conference				
#	Team	W	L	PCT	GB
1	z-Boston Celtics	54	28	.659	–
2	y-Cleveland Cavaliers	49	33	.598	5
3	x-Washington Bullets	48	34	.585	6
4	x-Philadelphia 76ers	46	36	.561	8
5	x-Buffalo Braves	46	36	.561	8
6	Houston Rockets	40	42	.488	14
7	New York Knicks	38	44	.463	16
8	New Orleans Jazz	38	44	.463	16
9	Atlanta Hawks	29	53	.354	25

=== Game log ===
1975–76 game log
Total: 49–33 (Home: 29–12; Road: 20–21)
October: 1–2 (home: 1–1; road: 0–1)

Game	Date	Team	Score	High points	High rebounds	High assists	Location Attendance	Record
1	October 23, 1975	Golden State						
2	October 25, 1975	@ New York						
3	October 30, 1975	Chicago						

November: 6–9 (home: 1–5; road: 5–4)

Game	Date	Team	Score	High points	High rebounds	High assists	Location Attendance	Record
4	November 1, 1975	New Orleans						
5	November 4, 1975	@ Washington						
6	November 6, 1975; 8:05 PM EST	@ Atlanta	W 113–108	Snyder (25)			The Omni; 3,761	2–4
7	November 7, 1975	@ New Orleans						
8	November 8, 1975	@ Houston						
9	November 11, 1975	@ Golden State						
10	November 14, 1975	@ Seattle						
11	November 15, 1975	@ Portland						
12	November 18, 1975	Houston						
13	November 20, 1975	Buffalo						
14	November 22, 1975	@ New York						
15	November 23, 1975	Boston						
16	November 25, 1975	@ Chicago						
17	November 27, 1975	Kansas City						
18	November 29, 1975	Seattle						

December: 11–4 (home: 6–1; road: 5–3)

Game	Date	Team	Score	High points	High rebounds	High assists	Location Attendance	Record
19	December 2, 1975	Portland						
20	December 4, 1975	@ Kansas City						
21	December 5, 1975	@ Buffalo						
22	December 9, 1975	@ Philadelphia						
23	December 11, 1975	New York						
24	December 12, 1975	@ Milwaukee						
25	December 13, 1975	New Orleans						
26	December 16, 1975	@ Los Angeles						
27	December 17, 1975	@ Seattle						
28	December 19, 1975	@ Phoenix						
29	December 21, 1975	Los Angeles						
30	December 26, 1975; 8:00 PM EST	Atlanta	L 97–98	Russell, Walker (17)			Coliseum at Richfield; 19,832	15–15
31	December 27, 1975	@ Washington						
32	December 28, 1975	Buffalo						
33	December 30, 1975	Kansas City						

January: 9–6 (home: 7–2; road: 2–4)

Game	Date	Team	Score	High points	High rebounds	High assists	Location Attendance	Record
34	January 2, 1976	@ Philadelphia						
35	January 3, 1976	Detroit						
36	January 7, 1976	@ Detroit						
37	January 8, 1976	Philadelphia						
38	January 10, 1976; 8:05 PM EST	@ Atlanta	W 106–100	Russell (18)			The Omni; 5,766	20–18
39	January 11, 1976	Washington						
40	January 14, 1976	@ Washington						
41	January 15, 1976; 8:00 PM EST	Atlanta	L 91–98	Smith (30)			Coliseum at Richfield; 8,364	21–20
42	January 17, 1976	Phoenix						
43	January 20, 1976	Boston						
44	January 22, 1976	Seattle						
45	January 24, 1976	Milwaukee						
46	January 27, 1976	Detroit						
47	January 28, 1976	@ Houston						
48	January 30, 1976	@ Chicago						

February: 9–2 (home: 5–0; road: 4–2)

Game	Date	Team	Score	High points	High rebounds	High assists	Location Attendance	Record
49	February 1, 1976	@ New Orleans						
All-Star Break
50	February 6, 1976	@ Philadelphia						
51	February 8, 1976	Washington						
52	February 12, 1976	Chicago						
53	February 13, 1976	@ Milwaukee						
54	February 14, 1976	@ Buffalo						
55	February 17, 1976; 8:00 PM EST	Atlanta	W 112–92	Russell (23)			Coliseum at Richfield; 10,417	33–22
56	February 19, 1976	Portland						
57	February 22, 1976	Houston						
58	February 23, 1976	@ Houston						
59	February 25, 1976	@ Detroit						
60	February 29, 1976	@ Los Angeles						

March: 9–7 (home: 6–2; road: 3–5)

Game	Date	Team	Score	High points	High rebounds	High assists	Location Attendance	Record
61	March 3, 1976	@ Phoenix						
62	March 5, 1976	@ Portland						
63	March 6, 1976	@ Golden State						
64	March 11, 1976	Golden State						
65	March 13, 1976	Phoenix						
66	March 16, 1976	Los Angeles						
67	March 18, 1976	Philadelphia						
68	March 19, 1976	@ New Orleans						
69	March 20, 1976; 8:05 PM EST	@ Atlanta	W 113–108	Chones, Cleamons (20)			The Omni; 3,761	41–28
70	March 21, 1976	Washington						
71	March 25, 1976	Buffalo						
72	March 26, 1976	@ Boston						
73	March 27, 1976	Milwaukee						
74	March 30, 1976	Houston						
75	March 31, 1976	@ New Orleans						

April: 4–3 (home: 3–1; road: 1–2)

Game	Date	Team	Score	High points	High rebounds	High assists	Location Attendance	Record
76	April 1, 1976	Boston						
77	April 3, 1976	@ Kansas City						
78	April 4, 1976; 3:00 PM EST	Atlanta	W 120–92	Carr (27)			Coliseum at Richfield; 8,439	46–32
79	April 6, 1976	@ Boston						
80	April 8, 1976	New Orleans						
81	April 10, 1976	New York						
82	April 11, 1976	@ New York						

1975–76 schedule

== Playoffs ==
1976 playoff game log
Conference Semifinals: 4–3 (home: 3–1; road: 1–2)

Game	Date	Team	Score	High points	High rebounds	High assists	Location Attendance	Series
1	April 13	Washington	L 95–100	Jim Chones (23)	Campy Russell (11)	Jim Cleamons (8)	Richfield Coliseum; 19,974	0–1
2	April 15	@ Washington	W 80–79	Bingo Smith (17)	Nate Thurmond (10)	Bingo Smith (4)	Capital Centre; 17,988	1–1
3	April 17	Washington	W 88–76	Smith, Carr (17)	Jim Brewer (12)	Jim Brewer (6)	Richfield Coliseum; 21,061	2–1
4	April 21	@ Washington	L 98–109	Campy Russell (22)	Jim Brewer (10)	Foots Walker (6)	Capital Centre; 17,542	2–2
5	April 22	Washington	W 92–91	Dick Snyder (26)	Jim Brewer (12)	Cleamons, Snyder (4)	Richfield Coliseum; 21,312	3–2
6	April 25	@ Washington	L 98–102 (OT)	Austin Carr (27)	Jim Brewer (12)	Cleamons, Carr (5)	Capital Centre; 19,035	3–3
7	April 29	Washington	W 87–85	Dick Snyder (23)	Jim Brewer (16)	Jim Cleamons (6)	Richfield Coliseum; 21,564	4–3

Conference Finals: 2–4 (home: 2–1; road: 0–3)

Game	Date	Team	Score	High points	High rebounds	High assists	Location Attendance	Series
1	May 5	@ Boston	L 99–111	Snyder, Russell (21)	Nate Thurmond (16)	Jim Cleamons (6)	Boston Garden; 14,264	0–1
2	May 9	@ Boston	L 89–94	Snyder, Smith (16)	Jim Brewer (9)	Foots Walker (6)	Boston Garden; 12,098	0–2
3	May 11	Boston	W 83–78	Jim Cleamons (18)	Jim Brewer (15)	Nate Thurmond (6)	Richfield Coliseum; 21,564	1–2
4	May 14	Boston	W 106–87	Bingo Smith (27)	Jim Brewer (11)	Jim Cleamons (8)	Richfield Coliseum; 21,564	2–2
5	May 16	@ Boston	L 94–99	Jim Cleamons (18)	Nate Thurmond (10)	Cleamons, Smith (4)	Boston Garden; 12,951	2–3
6	May 18	Boston	L 87–94	Austin Carr (26)	Nate Thurmond (14)	Thurmond, Cleamons (5)	Richfield Coliseum; 21,564	2–4

1976 schedule

Games 5 and 7 in the conference semifinal were both won by the Cavaliers on last-second shots. Jim Cleamons hit a layup as time expired in Game 5 and Dick Snyder hit a shot with four seconds left to win Game 7.

== Awards and records ==
- Bill Fitch, NBA Coach of the Year
- Jim Cleamons, NBA All-Defensive Second Team
- Jim Brewer, NBA All-Defensive Second Team
