= Campy Russell =

American basketball player (born 1952)

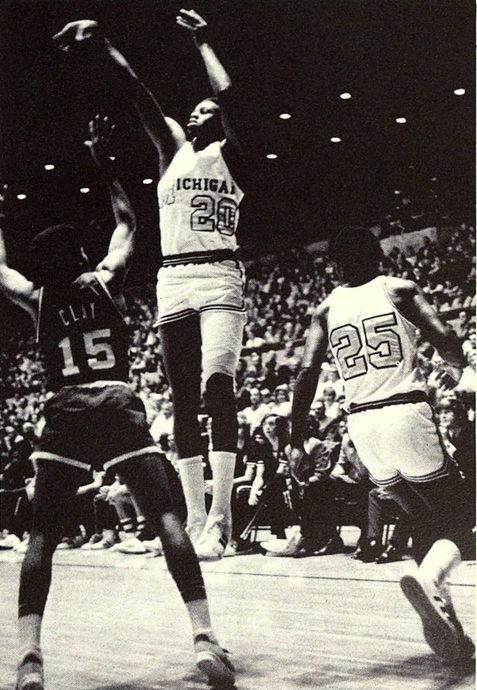
- Russell from the 1973 Michiganensian

Personal information
- Born: January 12, 1952 (age 74) Jackson, Tennessee, U.S.
- Listed height: 6 ft 8 in (2.03 m)
- Listed weight: 215 lb (98 kg)

Career information
- High school: Pontiac Central (Pontiac, Michigan)
- College: Michigan (1972–1974)
- NBA draft: 1974: 1st round, 8th overall pick
- Drafted by: Cleveland Cavaliers
- Playing career: 1974–1985
- Position: Small forward
- Number: 20, 21, 4

Career history
- 1974–1980: Cleveland Cavaliers
- 1980–1982: New York Knicks
- 1984: Cleveland Cavaliers
- 1984–1985: Detroit Spirits

Career highlights
- NBA All-Star (1979); Consensus second-team All-American (1974); First-team Parade All-American (1971)

Career NBA statistics
- Points: 8,953 (15.8 ppg)
- Rebounds: 2,696 (4.8 rpg)
- Assists: 1,684 (3.0 apg)
- Stats at NBA.com
- Stats at Basketball Reference

Michael Campanella "Campy" Russell (born January 12, 1952) is an American former professional basketball player. He played the small forward position in the National Basketball Association (NBA) for the Cleveland Cavaliers and New York Knicks for nine years (1975–1982, 1985) and played in the 1979 NBA All-Star Game.

== College ==
Before joining the NBA, Russell was a star player at the University of Michigan. Russell played three seasons at Michigan, and in his junior year he averaged 23.7 points per game. He was named an All American that year.

== Professional career ==
During his All Star season in the NBA in 1978–1979, Russell averaged 21.9 points, 6.8 rebounds and 4.7 assists per game for the Cavaliers.

== After basketball ==
Today, Russell works in the Cavaliers' front office as Director of Alumni Relations. He served as a co-host of the Cavaliers' pregame and postgame show (Cavaliers Live, alongside Cayleigh Griffin) on Bally Sports Ohio. ending with the 2023-2024 season. On March 26, 2022, Russell was honored with a spot on the Cavaliers Wall of Honor along with former players World B. Free and Lenny Wilkens and former owner Gordon Gund.

== NBA career statistics ==
Legend
GP	Games played	GS	Games started	MPG	Minutes per game
FG%	Field goal percentage	3P%	3-point field goal percentage	FT%	Free throw percentage
RPG	Rebounds per game	APG	Assists per game	SPG	Steals per game
BPG	Blocks per game	PPG	Points per game	**Bold**	Career high
*	Led the league

=== Regular season ===
Year	Team	GP	GS	MPG	FG%	3P%	FT%	RPG	APG	SPG	BPG	PPG
1974–75	Cleveland	68		11.1	.411	–	.752	2.2	.7	.3	.0	6.2
1975–76	Cleveland	**82**		23.9	**.482**	–	.773	4.2	1.3	.8	.1	15.0
1976–77	Cleveland	70		30.1	.434	–	.778	6.0	2.7	1.0	.3	16.5
1977–78	Cleveland	72		35.0	.448	–	.751	6.4	3.9	1.2	.2	19.4
1978–79	Cleveland	74		**38.6**	.476	–	**.797**	**6.8**	**4.7**	1.3	.3	**21.9**
1979–80	Cleveland	41		32.5	.451	.111	.745	5.5	4.2	**1.8**	**.5**	18.2
1980–81	New York	79		36.3	.464	.308	.781	4.5	3.3	1.3	.1	16.4
1981–82	New York	77	63	30.6	.478	**.439***	.776	3.1	3.7	1.0	.2	13.9
1984–85	Cleveland	3	0	8.0	.286	.000	.667	1.7	1.0	.0	.0	2.0
Career		566	63	29.6	.459	.366	.772	4.8	3.0	1.0	.2	15.8
All-Star		1	0	13.0	.250	–	–	1.0	.0	.0	.0	4.0

=== Playoffs ===
Year	Team	GP	GS	MPG	FG%	3P%	FT%	RPG	APG	SPG	BPG	PPG
1976	Cleveland	**13**		25.2	.404	–	.855	5.5	1.1	.6	**.5**	13.6
1977	Cleveland	3		33.3	.389	–	.733	**8.7**	3.3	1.0	.3	17.7
1978	Cleveland	2		44.0	**.487**	–	.810	7.5	5.5	1.5	**.5**	**27.5**
1981	New York	2		**44.5**	.441	.000	**.941**	4.5	4.5	**2.0**	**.5**	23.0
Career		20		30.3	.417	.000	.843	6.1	2.2	.9	.5	16.6

== See also ==
- University of Michigan Athletic Hall of Honor
