= 1975–76 Philadelphia 76ers season =

Season of National Basketball Association team the Philadelphia 76ers

- Head coach: Gene Shue
- General manager: Pat Williams
- Arena: The Spectrum

Results
- Record: 46–36 (.561)
- Place: Division: 2nd (Atlantic); Conference: 4th (Eastern)
- Playoff finish: First round (lost to Braves 1–2)
- Stats at Basketball Reference

Local media
- Television: WKBS-TV
- Radio: WCAU

The 1975–76 Philadelphia 76ers season was the 76ers 27th season in the NBA and 13th season in Philadelphia. The Philadelphia 76ers posted a 46–36 regular-season record, and returned to the NBA Playoffs for the first time since 1971, ending a string of four consecutive losing seasons. The team had acquired forward George McGinnis from the ABA's Indiana Pacers, and also drafted shooting guard Lloyd Free (later changed name to World B. Free). The Sixers, however, lost to the Buffalo Braves, two games to one in the first round of the Eastern Conference playoffs. This season would also be the last as a player for Billy Cunningham, who suffered an injury early in the season.

== NBA draft ==
Round	Pick	Player	Position	Nationality	College
1	5	Darryl Dawkins	C	United States	
2	23	World B. Free	SG	United States	Guilford
3	39	Jimmie Baker	F	United States	Hawaiʻi
3	41	Charles Cleveland	SG	United States	Alabama
4	59	Louis Dunbar	F	United States	Houston
5	77	Ken Tyler		United States	Gonzaga
6	95	Ken Alston		United States	Valdosta State
7	113	Mike Flynn	G	United States	Kentucky
8	131	Freeman Blade	G	United States	MSU Billings
9	148	Larry Harralson		United States	Drake
10	164	Rick Reed		United States	Azusa Pacific

== Roster ==
Philadelphia 76ers roster
Players

Pos.	No.	Player	Height	Weight	DOB	From
PF	23	Joe Bryant	6 ft 9 in (2.06 m)	185 lb (84 kg)	1954-10-19	La Salle
PG	3	Fred Carter	6 ft 3 in (1.91 m)	185 lb (84 kg)	1945-02-14	Mount St. Mary's
C	42	Harvey Catchings	6 ft 10 in (2.08 m)	218 lb (99 kg)	1951-09-02	Hardin–Simmons
SG	20	Doug Collins	6 ft 6 in (1.98 m)	180 lb (82 kg)	1951-07-28	Illinois State
SF	32	Billy Cunningham (injured)	6 ft 6 in (1.98 m)	210 lb (95 kg)	1943-06-03	North Carolina
C	53	Darryl Dawkins	6 ft 11 in (2.11 m)	251 lb (114 kg)	1957-01-11	Maynard Evans HS (FL)
PF	25	Leroy Ellis	6 ft 11 in (2.11 m)	210 lb (95 kg)	1940-03-10	St. John's
SG	21	Lloyd Free	6 ft 2 in (1.88 m)	185 lb (84 kg)	1953-12-09	Guilford
C	34	Clyde Lee	6 ft 10 in (2.08 m)	205 lb (93 kg)	1944-03-14	Vanderbilt
PF	30	George McGinnis	6 ft 8 in (2.03 m)	235 lb (107 kg)	1950-08-12	Indiana
SF	50	Steve Mix	6 ft 7 in (2.01 m)	215 lb (98 kg)	1947-12-30	Toledo
PG	22	Connie Norman	6 ft 3 in (1.91 m)	175 lb (79 kg)	1953-09-24	Arizona

Coaches
Head coach
- Gene Shue
Assistant(s)
- Jack McMahon

Legend
- (DP) Unsigned draft pick
- (FA) Free agent
- (S) Suspended
- Injured

== Regular season ==
=== Season standings ===
Atlantic Division	W	L	PCT	GB	Home	Road	Div
y-Boston Celtics	54	28	.659	–	31–10	23–18	13–8
x-Philadelphia 76ers	46	36	.561	8	34–7	12–29	9–12
x-Buffalo Braves	46	36	.561	8	28–14	18–22	10–11
New York Knicks	38	44	.463	16	24–17	14–27	10–11

#	Eastern Conference				
#	Team	W	L	PCT	GB
1	z-Boston Celtics	54	28	.659	–
2	y-Cleveland Cavaliers	49	33	.598	5
3	x-Washington Bullets	48	34	.585	6
4	x-Philadelphia 76ers	46	36	.561	8
5	x-Buffalo Braves	46	36	.561	8
6	Houston Rockets	40	42	.488	14
7	New York Knicks	38	44	.463	16
8	New Orleans Jazz	38	44	.463	16
9	Atlanta Hawks	29	53	.354	25

z – clinched division title
y – clinched division title
x – clinched playoff spot

== Playoffs ==
1976 playoff game log
First Round: 1–2 (home: 0–2; road: 1–0)

Game	Date	Team	Score	High points	High rebounds	High assists	Location Attendance	Series
1	April 15	Buffalo	L 89–95	Fred Carter (30)	George McGinnis (15)	George McGinnis (4)	Spectrum; 14,352	0–1
2	April 16	@ Buffalo	W 131–106	George McGinnis (34)	George McGinnis (11)	Fred Carter (6)	Buffalo Memorial Auditorium; 12,049	1–1
3	April 18	Buffalo	L 123–124 (OT)	Fred Carter (32)	George McGinnis (15)	Fred Carter (6)	Spectrum; 13,087	1–2

1976 schedule

== Awards and records ==
- George McGinnis, All-NBA First Team, NBA All-Star
- Doug Collins, NBA All-Star
