= Dave Cowens =

American basketball player and coach (born 1948)

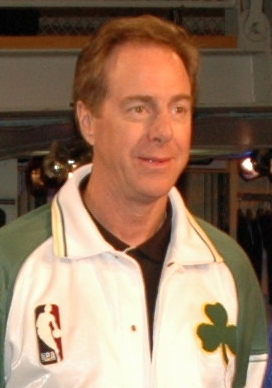
- Cowens in 2005

Boston Celtics
- Title: Consultant
- League: NBA

Personal information
- Born: October 25, 1948 (age 78) Newport, Kentucky, U.S.
- Listed height: 6 ft 9 in (2.06 m)
- Listed weight: 230 lb (104 kg)

Career information
- High school: Newport Catholic (Newport, Kentucky)
- College: Florida State (1967–1970)
- NBA draft: 1970: 1st round, 4th overall pick
- Drafted by: Boston Celtics
- Playing career: 1970–1980, 1982–1983
- Position: Center
- Number: 18, 36
- Coaching career: 1978–2009

Career history

Playing
- 1970–1980: Boston Celtics
- 1982–1983: Milwaukee Bucks

Career highlights
- 2× NBA champion (1974, 1976); NBA Most Valuable Player (1973); 8× NBA All-Star (1972–1978, 1980); NBA All-Star Game MVP (1973); 3× All-NBA Second Team (1973, 1975, 1976); NBA All-Defensive First Team (1976); 2× NBA All-Defensive Second Team (1975, 1980); NBA Rookie of the Year (1971); NBA All-Rookie Team (1971); NBA anniversary team (50th, 75th); No. 18 retired by Boston Celtics; No. 13 retired by Florida State Seminoles

Career NBA playing statistics
- Points: 13,516 (17.6 ppg)
- Rebounds: 10,444 (13.6 rpg)
- Assists: 2,910 (3.8 apg)
- Stats at NBA.com
- Stats at Basketball Reference

Career coaching record
- NBA: 161–191 (.457)
- Record at Basketball Reference
- Basketball Hall of Fame
- Collegiate Basketball Hall of Fame

David William Cowens (/ˈkaʊənz/ COW-ənz; born October 25, 1948) is an American former professional basketball player and NBA head coach. At 6 ft 9 in (2.06 m), he played the center position and occasionally played power forward. Cowens spent most of his playing career with the Boston Celtics. He was the 1971 NBA Rookie of the Year and the 1973 NBA Most Valuable Player. Cowens won NBA championships as a member of the Celtics in 1974 and 1976. He was inducted into the Naismith Memorial Basketball Hall of Fame in 1991. Throughout his career Cowens was known for being an undersized center, however he made up for his height with hustle and athleticism. Cowens has also held coaching positions in the NBA, CBA, and WNBA.

Cowens was named a member of both the NBA 50th Anniversary All-Time Team and the NBA 75th Anniversary Team.

== Early life ==
David William Cowens was born on October 25, 1948, in Newport, Kentucky, one of six children of Jack and Ruth Cowens. His father was a World War II veteran, and later worked as a barber and Ruth served as a stay-at-home mother to David and his siblings. His family lived in a modest two-story home on Lexington Avenue in East Newport, with his extended relatives such as his grandparents and a great-aunt.

Growing up Cowens spent his time fishing in the Ohio River, adventuring into Cincinnati by hopping freight trains, often self-funding trips via odd jobs. He attended St. Anthony's School in Bellevue, at the age of eight he began playing organized basketball joining an organized basketball team practicing in the church basement gym, he also participated in many other sports growing up such as baseball, track and field, football, and swimming.

He later attended Newport Catholic High School, and during his freshman year he had a conflict with the basketball coach and quit the team and turned to swimming and track and field. Cowens initially didn’t have any thoughts of returning to basketball until he had a five-inch growth spurt between his sophomore and junior years. He went on to play his junior and senior years and excelled in the sport.

== College career ==
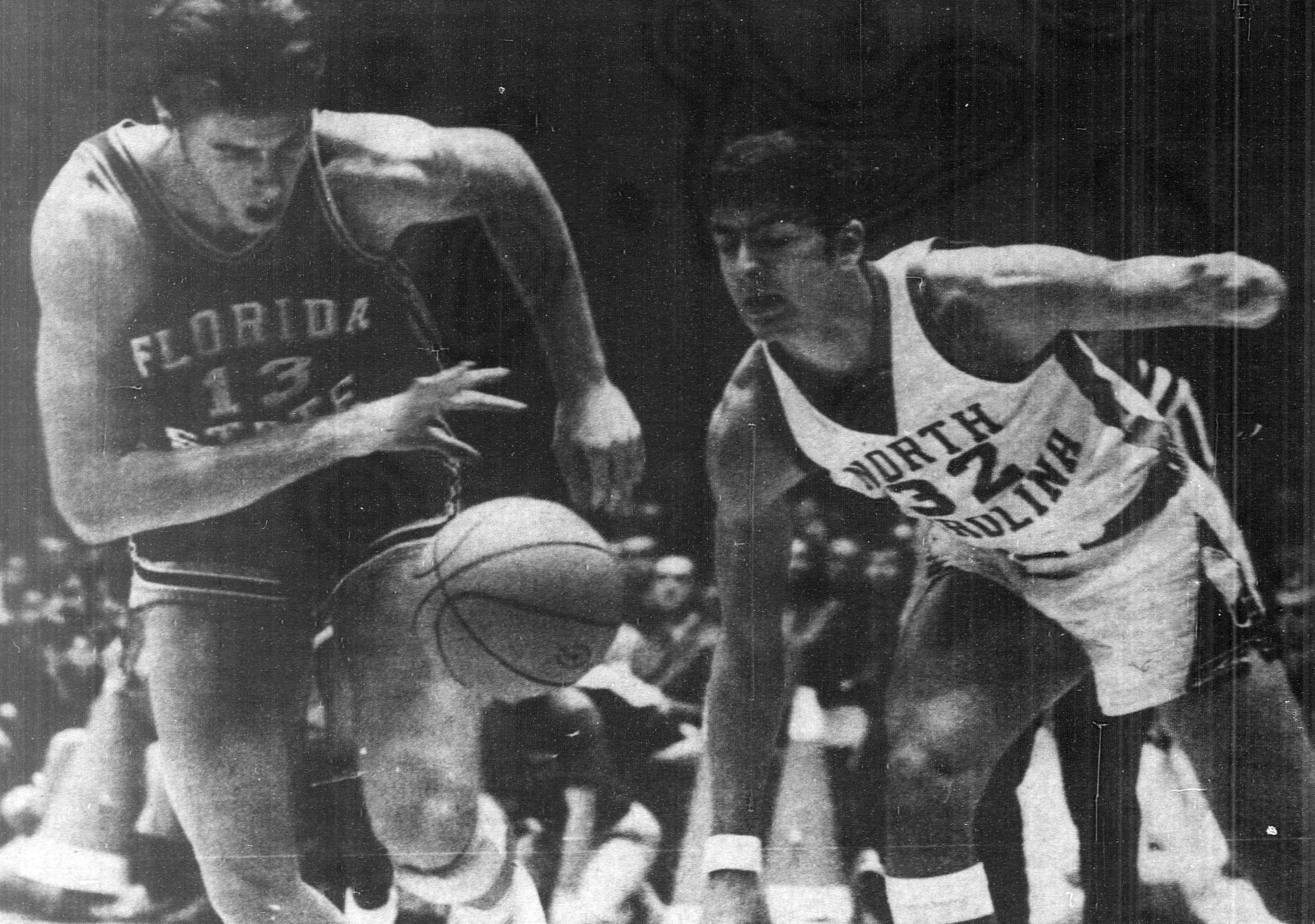
Cowens (to the left) next to Dave Chadwick in 1969

Coming out of high school Cowens was mainly recruited from schools in the Ohio Valley Conference along with the University of Kentucky and Florida State University. However his high school coach later recommended Florida State University, and head coach Hugh Durham later promised him a starting role by his sophomore year while emphasizing resulting in Cowens committing to Florida State.

Cowens attended Florida State University. He played from 1967 to 1970 for coach Hugh Durham. During his sophomore year Cowens made an immediate impact averaging 18.8 points per game and 16.8 rebounds per game. His best year came during his junior year where averaged 20+ points a games and 17.5 rebounds. During his senior year he averaged 17 points and rebounds a game.

Cowens is often considered one of the best players in Florida State history. He scored 1,479 points in 78 games at Florida State, at 19.0 points per game, and ranks among Florida State's top 10 all-time scoring leaders. Cowens is the all-time Florida State leading rebounder with 1,340 rebounds (17.2 rebounds per game). He holds the team record for best seasonal rebound average (17.5 in the 1968–1969 season). He once grabbed 31 rebounds (second-best all-time) against LSU in the 1968–69 season, and also had a record 456 in one season.

Cowens was named to The Sporting News All-America second team in 1970. His number hangs in the rafters of the Donald L. Tucker Center.

== Professional career ==
=== Boston Celtics (1970–1980) ===
Cowens was selected as the fourth overall pick by the Boston Celtics in the 1970 NBA draft. Former Celtics center Bill Russell's recommendation of Cowens influenced the selection. While some critics believed that Cowens was too small to play center, Russell said: "No one is going to tell that kid he can't play center". Jim Loscutoff had declined to have his No. 18 jersey number retired by the Celtics, instead choosing to allow other players to wear the number. This allowed Cowens to wear No. 18 as well.

During his rookie year, Cowens appeared in 81 games playing around 38 minutes a game for the Celtics. He made an immediate impact and averaged 17.0 points per game and 15.0 rebounds per game which was the most ever by a first-year Celtics player besides Bill Russell. He was named to the NBA All-Rookie First Team and shared the NBA's Rookie of the Year honors with Portland's Geoff Petrie. He also led the league in personal fouls that same year with 350. Despite his play the Celtics missed the postseason for the first time since 1950.

During his second year in the 1971–72 season Cowens appeared in 79 games and began playing 40 minutes a game. His numbers went up slightly from his rookie year (averaging 18.8 PPG, 15.2 RPG and 3.1 APG) and he was selected to his first All-Star game. That year Cowens helped the Celtics claim the best record in the Eastern Conference and averaged 15.5 PPG and 13.8 RPG in the 11 game playoff run, the first of his career. He and the Celtics were defeated in the conference semifinals by the New York Knicks 4–1.

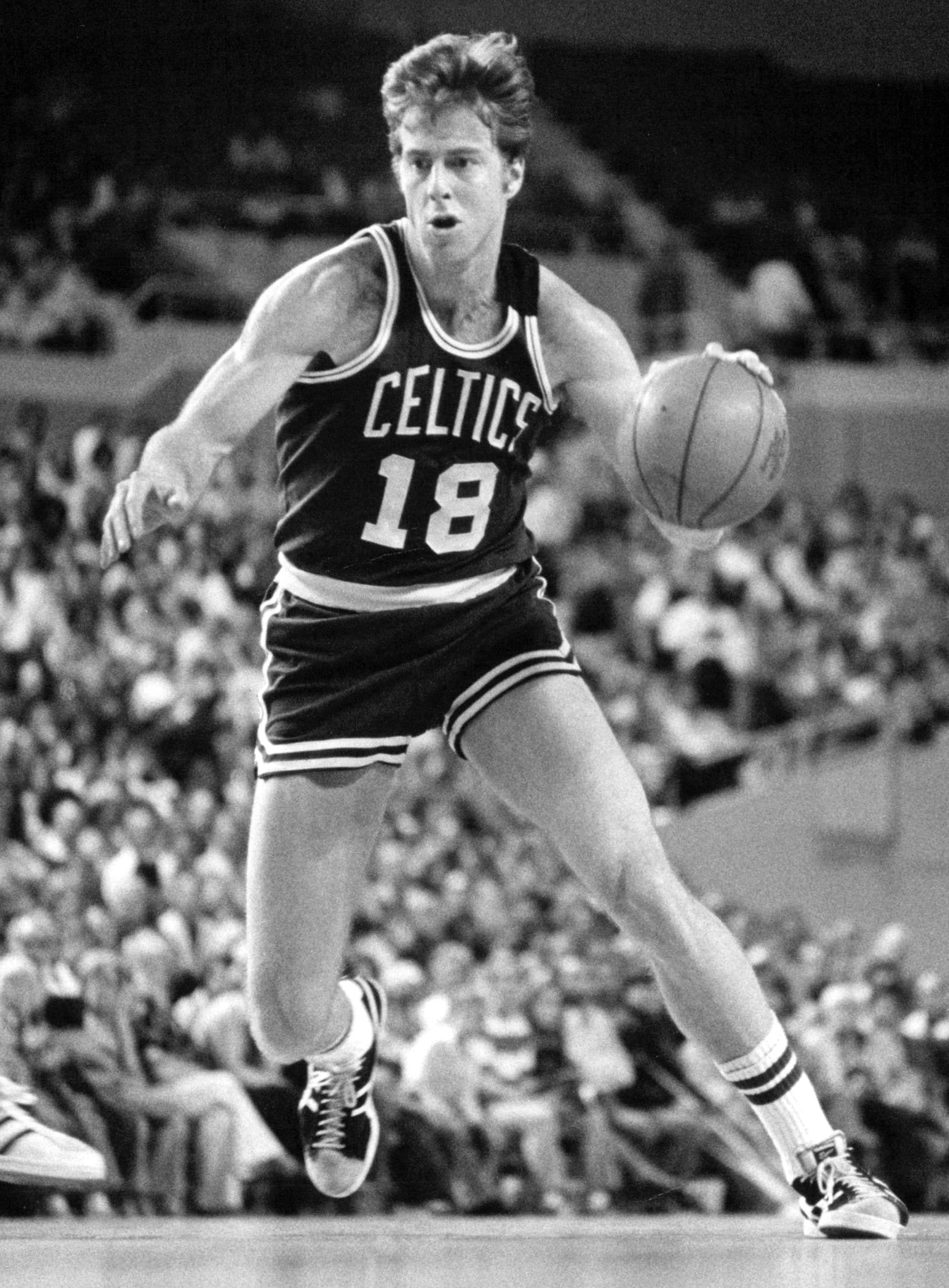
Cowens with the Boston Celtics in 1976

In the 1972–73 season, Cowens appeared in all 82 games for the only time in his career, playing 40+ minutes a game. He went on to average a career high 20.5 PPG, a career high 16.2 RPG (third that year only behind Wilt Chamberlain and Nate Thurmond) along with 4.1 APG while helping the Celtics to a league-best 68–14 record. In that season also, Cowens scored 20 points, grabbed a career-high 32 rebounds and dished out 9 assists in a home win over the Houston Rockets. He also had 29 rebounds in a game vs. the Baltimore Bullets on January 7 of that year. He carried the Celtics to the semifinals, where they met the New York Knicks. They won Game 1 of that best-of-7 series after Cowens recorded 15 points and 18 rebounds. However, they bowed out to the Knicks in Game 7 following injuries to John Havlicek. He put up postseason highs in 13 games with 21.9 PPG and 16.6 RPG.

For his efforts Cowens was chosen as the 1973 NBA MVP, beating out Kareem Abdul-Jabbar. Cowens later told HOOP magazine in 1992: "Being named the MVP by my peers meant a lot to me, I was always out to gain the respect of the players, they are the only ones who understand your work habits." Cowens was also named MVP of the All-Star Game that same season, scoring 15 points and pulling down 13 rebounds during the contest. Cowens and fellow Celtic Bill Russell both have the distinction of being named MVP of the league but not being included on the All-NBA First Team. However, Cowens was named to his first All-NBA Second Team.

The following season, Cowens played in 80 games and played a career high 41.9 MPG, he averaged 19.0 PPG, 15.7 RPG, 4.4 APG and a career high 1.3 BPG while guiding the Celtics to a record of 56–26. During the year he also achieved his first of six career triple doubles on November 25, 1973 vs. Cleveland where he scored 21 points, 18 rebounds and 11 assists. He set multiple Celtics single season records, including total defensive rebounds with 993, defensive rebounds per game with 12.4, and a 90.6 defensive rating. He was also selected to his third straight All-Star Game. Cowens was instrumental in bringing the Celtics into the playoffs, where they defeated the Buffalo Braves in six games and the New York Knicks in five. In the finals, the Celtics faced the top-seeded Milwaukee Bucks. The teams split the first six games, with each team winning at least once on their home court. This led to a decisive Game 7, where the Celtics faced the Bucks in Milwaukee. The Celtics prevailed thanks to a strong performance by Cowens, who recorded 28 points and 14 rebounds as the Celtics took their 12th NBA championship. During the postseason run Cowens averaged 20.5 PPG and 13.3 RPG.

Prior to the 1974–75 season Cowens broke his foot in a preseason match up and didn’t play in his first game until November 21, 1974 vs. the Phoenix Suns. Cowens went on to play 65 games that year following his return, and continued with his strong play averaging 20.4 PPG, 14.7 RPG, 4.6 APG, 1.1 BPG and a career high 1.3 steals per game. That year Cowens also finished behind Wes Unseld for the league’s rebounding title. For his defensive efforts Cowens was selected to his first NBA All-Defensive Second Team, appeared in his fourth straight All-Star game, and was selected to his second All-NBA Second Team. That year Cowens helped lead the Celtics to a 60–22 record and they beat the Houston Rockets 4–1 in the conference semifinals, as he averaged 20.5 PPG, 16.5 RPG, and 4.2 APG. Despite this, he and the Celtics lost in the conference finals 4–2 to the Washington Bullets.

The next season in 1975–76 Cowens played in 78 games for the Celtics averaging just under 40 minutes a game. During a game on January 16, 1976 vs. the Philadelphia 76ers Cowens scored a career high 39 points in a Celtics 118–110 win. As for the rest of the season Cowens averaged 19.0 PPG, 16.0 RPG and 4.2 APG. Defensively he recorded 1.2 blocks and 0.9 steals per game and was named to his first and only NBA All-Defensive First Team. Additionally, he was named to his third and final All-NBA Second Team. That year he and the Celtics finished with the best record in the East, and the Celtics took down both Buffalo and Cleveland 4–2 to reach the 1976 NBA Finals vs. the Phoenix Suns. Cowens played a pivotal role during the team’s postseason run averaging 21.0 PPG 16.4 RPG and 4.6 APG. The Celtics were up 3–2 heading into game 6 of the Finals and Cowens played a key role in the deciding game making multiple defensive plays and picking up the slack for fellow star players Jo Jo White and an injured John Havlicek to secure his second and final NBA championship. During the Finals, CBS commentator and still-active NBA player Rick Barry stated "There is no player with greater desire than Dave Cowens."

Eight games into the 1976–77 season on November 10, 1976, and with the Celtics on a four-game losing streak, Cowens left the team for "undisclosed reasons". Speculations included that Cowens was upset that the team didn't offer Paul Silas a new contract after the previous season and traded him to the Denver Nuggets. Other speculations were that he was unhappy with coach Tom Heinsohn and also his involvement in a lawsuit from the previous season where he allegedly struck a fan during a game against the Houston Rockets. Cowens returned to the team in January 1977 and played 50 total games throughout the year scoring 16.4 PPG, 13.9 RPG and a career high 5.0 APG. He was also selected to his sixth straight All-Star game. He helped lead the Celtics to the playoffs, where he averaged 16.6 points and 14.9 rebounds; however, they were eliminated in the second round by the Philadelphia 76ers.

During the 1977–78 season Cowens played in 77 games for the Celtics playing 40+ minutes a game. He averaged 18.6 points, 14 rebounds, 4.6 assists, 0.9 blocks, and 1.3 steals making Cowens the first player in NBA history to lead their team in all 5 major categories. He also set career highs in free throw percentage shooting .842 along with boasting a .490 field goal percentage which was also a career high. He was once again selected to that year's All-Star game. Despite personal success, the Celtics missed the playoffs for the first time since his 1970–71 rookie season.

After Coach Satch Sanders was fired following a 2–12 start to the 1978–1979 season, Cowens served as player-coach for the remainder of the season. Cowens has the distinction as the last player-coach in NBA history and later reflected on the experience in a 2019 interview stating:

I was just a player on a team, then all the sudden I’m the coach as well. So just managing that transition and now that authority over the guys that you were just an equal with and now you’re trying to do both things. ...[Y]ou only got to deal with the negative stuff and the fun thing of coaching is you can’t coach when you’re playing. You can only coach when you’re on the bench. So when you’re playing you give the coaching over to Bob MacKinnon and K.C. Jones and then when you go back on the bench, you kind of like have to feel their way back into their coaching as the game was preceding [sic].

As player-coach Cowens was still a impactful player. He appeared in 68 games that year scoring 16.6 points, 9.6 rebounds and 3.6 assists per game. However he was not selected to the All-Star game for the first time since his second year in the league and the Celtics finished the year with a 29–53 record, missing the postseason for a second straight year.

The 1979–80 season was his final year with the Celtics. Cowens averaged 14.2 points, 8.1 rebounds and 3.1 assists during the season. He also had a productive seasons on the defensive side of the ball averaging just under a block and 1 steal per game. He was selected to his second NBA All-Defensive Second Team along with playing in his 8th and final All-Star game. Cowens helped the team to a 61–21 record. Cowens and the Celtics defeated the Houston Rockets 4–0 in the Eastern Conference playoffs before losing to the Philadelphia 76ers 4–1 in the Eastern Conference finals. He averaged 12 points and 7.3 RPG, during what would turn out to be his final postseason run.

Cowens retired as a player in 1980, as Boston drafted Kevin McHale and traded for Robert Parish to replace him at center. Boston went on to win the 1981 NBA Championship. "I have sprained my ankle at least 30 times over the duration of my career, broken both legs and fractured a foot," Cowens said upon retiring. "Two years ago, a team of foot and bone specialists said they were amazed that I could play up to that point without sustaining serious injuries."

In 1982–83, Cowens felt the desire to play again and approached the Celtics about trading him, as they still held his rights. Cowens said, "The Celtics are set up front [with Bird, McHale and Parish]. They could trade me, work something out. No disrespect to Bill Fitch. I'd advise any younger players to play for him, but I'd probably be better off somewhere else".

=== Milwaukee Bucks (1982–1983) ===
After first negotiating with the Phoenix Suns, the Celtics traded Cowens to the Milwaukee Bucks, who were coached by former Celtic teammate Don Nelson. The Celtics received Quinn Buckner from Milwaukee as compensation. Cowens averaged 8.1 points, 6.9 rebounds and 2.1 assists in 25 minutes per game with the Bucks. He was injured in the final game of the regular season and was unable to play in the playoffs for Milwaukee. Cowens retired for good after the season.

== Player profile and legacy ==
Cowens stood at 6 feet 9 inches tall, and was viewed as an undersized for an NBA center during the 1970s, when many opponents of that era like Kareem Abdul-Jabbar towered over him, so to counteract his size Cowens instead used his explosive athleticism, quickness along with his stamina to make up for his height and guard multiple different positions effectively. Offensively, Cowens often roamed the outside, shooting soft jumpers or driving to the basket. Another part of Cowens game was his intensity, avidly diving for loose balls, maintaining full effort on every possession, and exhibiting a "perpetual motion" approach that would fatigue the opposition. During his Hall of Fame induction Cowens stated "I never thought of myself as a superstar, I represent the working class of the NBA."

His former coach Tom Heinsohn once said of Cowens "If David isn’t aggressive almost to the point of being reckless, then he’s not Dave Cowens. It’s the competitiveness that enables him to play center at 6-foot-9." Former player Clyde Lee also commented on Cowens, once stating "I’d describe Cowens as a guy who, if he had to run through a brick wall to win, he would do it." Cowens' playing credo was all-out intensity at both ends of the court, a style that never wavered during his 11-year NBA career. "He was quick, fast, strong and skilled, and played hard," Knicks Hall of Fame center Willis Reed said of Cowens.

During his early years in Boston Cowens teammates John Havlicek, Jo Jo White, and Charlie Scott would typically score more than Cowens. He later stated commented on this and his play style stating:

I never regarded myself as a shooter until the 1972–73 season. I started to shoot more because it’s a team game and, by scoring, I helped the team. But I’m no White or Havlicek." I concentrate on defensive play and let the points fall where they may. It’s hard work, but it’s fun. Rebounding and blocking out are the guts of the game. The fans don’t always know what you’re doing, but the players on both teams do. Maybe that’s why I enjoyed defense so much.”

During his NBA career, Cowens averaged a double-double of 17.6 points and 13.6 rebounds with 3.8 assists and 1.1 steals in 766 career NBA games. Cowens was selected to eight All-Star Games, was named to the All-NBA Second Team three times, and was named to the All-NBA Defensive First Team in 1976 and All-NBA Defensive Second Team in 1973 and 1980. He was a member of the Celtics' 1974 and 1976 NBA Championship teams.

Cowens was the fourth center in NBA history to average five assists per game in a single season, joining Wilt Chamberlain, former Celtic center Bill Russell, and Kareem Abdul-Jabbar. His career average is 3.8 assists per game. As of the end of the 2018–19 season, Cowens ranked 27th overall for most point-rebound-assist triple-doubles by a center in NBA history.

As evidence to his all-around ability, only five other players (Scottie Pippen, Kevin Garnett, LeBron James, Giannis Antetokounmpo and Nikola Jokić) have led their teams in all five major statistical categories for a season: points, rebounds, assists, blocks, and steals. He accomplished the feat in the 1977–78 season, averaging 18.6 points, 14.0 rebounds, 4.6 assists, 0.9 blocks and 1.3 steals as Boston finished 32–50.

Cowens was inducted into the Naismith Basketball Hall of Fame in 1991. In 1996, Cowens was honored as one of the league's greatest players of all time by being named to the NBA 50th Anniversary Team. In October 2021, Cowens was again honored as one of the league's greatest players of all time by being named to the NBA 75th Anniversary Team. To commemorate the NBA's 75th Anniversary The Athletic ranked their top 75 players of all time, and named Cowens as the 57th greatest player in NBA history.

The Dave Cowens Achievement award is presented each year to the top high school senior basketball players in Southeastern Massachusetts. In 2018, Cowens attended a ceremony at his high school where they dedicated a new gymnasium floor, styled in the parquet pattern of Boston Garden.

He has also been credited for helping resurrect the Celtics dynasty which was presumed dead following the departure of Bill Russell. "No one ever did more for the Celtics than Dave did," said John Havlicek of his Celtic teammate. Additionally, Jerry West credited Cowens for the Celtics defensive transformation during the 1970s with his shot blocking, aggressiveness, and overall improvement.

== Coaching career ==
=== Boston Celtics (1978–1979) ===
He began his coaching career by serving as a player-coach for the Boston Celtics during the 1978–79 season, but he quit coaching after the season and returned as a full-time player before retiring in 1980.

=== Bay State Bombardiers (1984–1985) ===
Cowens coached the Bay State Bombardiers of the Continental Basketball Association in 1984–85.

=== San Antonio Spurs (1994–1996) ===
Cowens returned to the NBA coaching ranks as an assistant coach for the San Antonio Spurs in 1994–96 and was considered for the coaching job of the Boston Celtics during the 1995 offseason.

=== Charlotte Hornets (1996–1999) ===
In 1996 Cowens was named the next head coach of the Charlotte Hornets replacing Allan Bristow after the team's 42–40 finish the prior season. In his first year as head coach during the 1996–97 season, he led the team to a 13-game improvement from the following year with to 54–28 record, securing the Eastern Conference's fourth seed however they were swept by the New York Knicks before in the opening round. During the 1997–98 season he coached the team to another winning season with a 51–31 record, once again securing the fourth seed. They beat the Atlanta Hawks in the opening round 3–1 before losing to the Chicago Bulls 4–1 n the semifinals. However, tensions arose in half way through the 1998–99 season and Cowens resigned on March 8, 1999, citing dissatisfaction with his salary as one of the league's lowest-paid coaches.

=== Golden State Warriors (2000–2001) ===
Cowens was the head coach of the Golden State Warriors from 2000 to 2001. He was the head coach for the entire 2000–2001 season, before being fired 23 games into the 2001–2002 season.

=== Chicago Sky (2006) ===
In 2005–06 Cowens was appointed the first head coach and general manager of the Chicago Sky of the Women's National Basketball Association (WNBA) however he departed after one season finishing with a 5–29 record.

=== Detroit Pistons (2006–2009) ===
Following his stint with the Chicago Sky Cowens left the team to become an assistant coach of the Detroit Pistons from 2006 to 2009.

=== Boston Celtics (2014–present) ===
During the 2014–15 season Cowens returned to the Celtics once again this time as a consultant, a role he still holds to this day.

== Personal life ==
Cowens married his wife, Deby, in 1978. They have two daughters and several grandchildren. He splits his time between Maine and Sarasota, Florida, and still attends select Celtics games while maintaining a low-profile retirement in the local community.

In 1977, Cowens spent a day driving a taxi cab for the Independent Taxi Operators Association (ITOA) in Boston. "Nobody even knew who I was," Cowens told ESPN. "I put my cap on and just you know drove around. I got decent tips, though."

In 1992 Cowens alongside Dave DeBusschere, Dave Bing, Oscar Robertson and Archie Clark founded the National Basketball Retired Players Association, which serves as the official alumni organization for the NBA, ABA, Harlem Globetrotters, and WNBA.

=== Politics ===
In 1990, Cowens, a former Democrat, ran as a Republican for Massachusetts Secretary of the Commonwealth. However, because he did not register by June 5, 1989, he was unable to appear on the primary ballot. Cowens considered running a sticker campaign for the Republican nomination, but decided to drop out of the race.

== Career highlights and awards ==
The Celtics retired Cowens' #18 in 1981.

=== NBA ===
- NBA champion: 1974, 1976
- NBA MVP: 1973
- NBA All-Star: 1972, 1973, 1974, 1975, 1976, 1977, 1978, 1980
- NBA All-Star Game MVP: 1973
- All-NBA Second Team: 1973, 1975, 1976
- NBA All-Defensive First Team: 1976
- NBA All-Defensive Second Team: 1975, 1980
- NBA Rookie of the Year: 1971 (shared with Geoff Petrie)
- NBA All-Rookie Team: 1971
- The Sport News Rookie of the Year: 1971
- NBA anniversary team: 50th, 75th
- On February 8, 1981, the Boston Celtics retired Cowens's #18 jersey.
- In 1991, Cowens was inducted into the Naismith Memorial Basketball Hall of Fame.

=== College ===
- Converse – 2nd Team All-American: 1970
- The Sporting News – 2nd Team All-American: 1970
- Cowens's #13 is a retired number at Florida State University.
- Cowens was inducted into the Florida State Athletics Hall of Fame in 1977.
- National Collegiate Basketball Hall of Fame

=== Other honors ===
- In 1973, Cowens was inducted into the Florida Sports Hall of Fame.
- Basketball Legacy Award from The Sports Museum at TD Garden: 2017
- Kentucky High School Athletic Association Hall of Fame: 2023

== NBA career statistics ==
Legend
GP	Games played	GS	Games started	MPG	Minutes per game
FG%	Field goal percentage	3P%	3-point field goal percentage	FT%	Free throw percentage
RPG	Rebounds per game	APG	Assists per game	SPG	Steals per game
BPG	Blocks per game	PPG	Points per game	**Bold**	Career high
†	Won an NBA championship	*	Led the league

=== Regular season ===
Year	Team	GP	GS	MPG	FG%	3P%	FT%	RPG	APG	SPG	BPG	PPG
1970–71	Boston	81	—	38.0	.422	—	.732	15.0	2.8	—	—	17.0
1971–72	Boston	79	—	40.3	.484	—	.720	15.2	3.1	—	—	18.8
1972–73	Boston	**82***	—	41.8	.452	—	.779	**16.2**	4.1	—	—	**20.5**
1973–74†	Boston	80	—	**41.9**	.437	—	.832	15.7	4.4	1.2	**1.3**	19.0
1974–75	Boston	65	—	40.5	.475	—	.783	14.7	4.6	**1.3**	1.1	20.4
1975–76†	Boston	78	—	39.8	.468	—	.756	16.0	4.2	1.2	0.9	19.0
1976–77	Boston	50	—	37.8	.434	—	.818	13.9	**5.0**	0.9	1.0	16.4
1977–78	Boston	77	—	41.8	**.490**	—	**.842**	14.0	4.6	**1.3**	0.9	18.6
1978–79	Boston	68	—	37.0	.483	—	.807	9.6	3.6	1.1	0.8	16.6
1979–80	Boston	66	55	32.7	.453	.083	.779	8.1	3.1	1.0	0.9	14.2
1982–83	Milwaukee	40	34	25.4	.444	.000	.825	6.9	2.1	0.8	0.4	8.1
Career		766	89	38.6	.460	.071	.783	13.6	3.8	1.1	0.9	17.6
All-Star		6	4	25.7	.500	—	.714	13.5	2.0	0.7	0.2	12.7

=== Playoffs ===
Year	Team	GP	GS	MPG	FG%	3P%	FT%	RPG	APG	SPG	BPG	PPG
1972	Boston	11	—	40.1	.455	—	.596	13.8	3.0	—	—	15.5
1973	Boston	13	—	**46.0**	.473	—	.659	**16.6**	3.7	—	—	**21.9**
1974†	Boston	**18**	—	42.9	.435	—	.797	13.3	3.7	1.2	0.9	20.5
1975	Boston	11	—	43.5	.428	—	.885	16.5	4.2	**1.6**	0.5	20.5
1976†	Boston	**18**	—	44.3	.457	—	.759	16.4	**4.6**	1.2	0.7	21.0
1977	Boston	9	—	42.1	.446	—	.773	14.9	4.0	0.9	**1.4**	16.6
1980	Boston	9	—	33.4	**.476**	.000	**.909**	7.3	2.3	1.0	0.8	12.0
Career		89	—	42.3	.451	.000	.744	14.4	3.7	1.2	0.9	18.9

== Head coaching record ==
=== NBA ===
Legend
Regular season	G	Games coached	W	Games won	L	Games lost	W–L %	Win–loss %
Playoffs	PG	Playoff games	PW	Playoff wins	PL	Playoff losses	PW–L %	Playoff win–loss %

Team	Year	G	W	L	W–L%	Finish	PG	PW	PL	PW–L%	Result
Boston	1978–79	68	27	41	.397	5th in Atlantic	-	-	-		Missed playoffs
Charlotte	1996–97	82	54	28	.659	4th in Central	3	0	3	.000	Lost in First Round
Charlotte	1997–98	82	51	31	.622	3rd in Central	9	4	5	.444	Lost in Conf. Semifinals
Charlotte	1998–99	15	4	11	.267	(resigned)	–	–	–	–	–
Golden State	2000–01	82	17	65	.207	7th in Pacific	–	–	–	–	Missed playoffs
Golden State	2001–02	23	8	15	.348	(fired)	–	–	–	–	–
Career		352	161	191	.457		12	4	8	.333	

=== WNBA ===
Legend
Regular season	G	Games coached	W	Games won	L	Games lost	W–L %	Win–loss %
Playoffs	PG	Playoff games	PW	Playoff wins	PL	Playoff losses	PW–L %	Playoff win–loss %

Team	Year	G	W	L	W–L%	Finish	PG	PW	PL	PW–L%	Result
CHI	2006	34	5	29	.147	7th in East	–	–	–	–	Missed Playoffs
Career		34	5	29	.147						

== See also ==
- List of National Basketball Association career rebounding leaders
- List of National Basketball Association single-season rebounding leaders
