= 1975–76 Boston Celtics season =

NBA basketball team season (NBA champions)

- NBA champions
- Conference champions
- Division champions
- Head coach: Tom Heinsohn
- General manager: Red Auerbach
- Arena: Boston Garden; Hartford Civic Center

Results
- Record: 54–28 (.659)
- Place: Division: 1st (Atlantic); Conference: 1st (Eastern)
- Playoff finish: NBA champions (Defeated Suns 4–2)
- Stats at Basketball Reference

Local media
- Television: WBZ-TV, WATR
- Radio: WBZ Radio, WTIC

The 1975–76 Boston Celtics season was their 30th in the National Basketball Association (NBA) and concluded with their 13th championship, defeating the Phoenix Suns in six games in the 1976 NBA Finals to win their 13th NBA Championship. The Celtics also won their division for the 5th consecutive season, and made their 14th finals appearance. This championship would be ranked 11th in the easiest paths to an NBA Finals championship by HoopsHype in 2024 due to the record of the team they played against in the championship match.

== Offseason ==
=== Draft picks ===
Round	Pick	Player	Position	Nationality	College

== Roster ==
1975–76 Boston Celtics roster
Players

Pos.	No.	Player	Height	Weight	DOB	From
G	42	Jerome Anderson	6 ft 5 in (1.96 m)	195 lb (88 kg)	1953-10-09	West Virginia
C	34	Jim Ard	6 ft 8 in (2.03 m)	215 lb (98 kg)	1948-09-19	Cincinnati
F	31	Tom Boswell	6 ft 9 in (2.06 m)	220 lb (100 kg)	1953-10-02	South Carolina
C	18	Dave Cowens	6 ft 9 in (2.06 m)	230 lb (104 kg)	1948-10-25	Florida State
F	17	John Havlicek	6 ft 5 in (1.96 m)	203 lb (92 kg)	1940-04-08	Ohio State
F	33	Steve Kuberski	6 ft 8 in (2.03 m)	215 lb (98 kg)	1947-11-06	Bradley
F	30	Glenn McDonald	6 ft 6 in (1.98 m)	190 lb (86 kg)	1952-03-18	Long Beach State
F	19	Don Nelson	6 ft 6 in (1.98 m)	210 lb (95 kg)	1940-05-15	Iowa
G	11	Charlie Scott	6 ft 5 in (1.96 m)	175 lb (79 kg)	1948-12-15	North Carolina
F	32	Ed Searcy	6 ft 6 in (1.98 m)	210 lb (95 kg)	1952-04-17	St. John's
F	35	Paul Silas	6 ft 7 in (2.01 m)	220 lb (100 kg)	1943-07-12	Creighton
G	27	Kevin Stacom	6 ft 3 in (1.91 m)	185 lb (84 kg)	1951-09-04	Providence
G	10	Jo Jo White	6 ft 3 in (1.91 m)	190 lb (86 kg)	1946-11-16	Kansas

Coaches
Head coach
- Tom Heinsohn

Legend
- (DP) Unsigned draft pick
- (FA) Free agent
- (S) Suspended
- Injured

Roster

== Regular season and postseason recap ==
The Celtics lost Don Chaney to the American Basketball Association before the 1975–76 season. To fill the gap in the backcourt they traded Paul Westphal to the Phoenix Suns for Charlie Scott, who had averaged more than 20 points in each of the previous three seasons. Despite an uncharacteristically weak bench, the Celtics finished in first place in their division and the second best record in the NBA this season. Boston earned a shot at another NBA title by defeating the Buffalo Braves and then the Cleveland Cavaliers in the playoffs.

Boston's opponents in the 1976 NBA Finals were the Phoenix Suns, who had posted a 42–40 regular-season record. The Team in Green was the oddsmakers' choice in the contest. The Celtics took the first two games at Boston Garden, but the Suns came back to win games 3 and 4 on their home court. Game 5 ranks among the all-time thrillers in NBA history. The Suns trailed by 5 points with less than a minute left on the clock, but Westphal made up the deficit almost single-handedly, sending the game into a first overtime period, which ended in a tie.

John Havlicek's basket with 2 seconds remaining in double overtime gave the Celtics a one-point lead, which Boston stretched to two points after sinking a technical foul. Then the Suns' Garfield Heard hit a last-second basket to send the contest into a third overtime. The longest game in NBA history finally ended, after three extra periods, with the Celtics winning 128–126. Two days later Boston captured yet another NBA championship, the 13th in franchise history.

=== Season standings ===
Atlantic Division	W	L	PCT	GB	Home	Road	Div
y-Boston Celtics	54	28	.659	–	31–10	23–18	13–8
x-Philadelphia 76ers	46	36	.561	8	34–7	12–29	9–12
x-Buffalo Braves	46	36	.561	8	28–14	18–22	10–11
New York Knicks	38	44	.463	16	24–17	14–27	10–11

#	Eastern Conference				
#	Team	W	L	PCT	GB
1	z-Boston Celtics	54	28	.659	–
2	y-Cleveland Cavaliers	49	33	.598	5
3	x-Washington Bullets	48	34	.585	6
4	x-Philadelphia 76ers	46	36	.561	8
5	x-Buffalo Braves	46	36	.561	8
6	Houston Rockets	40	42	.488	14
7	New York Knicks	38	44	.463	16
8	New Orleans Jazz	38	44	.463	16
9	Atlanta Hawks	29	53	.354	25

=== Game log ===
1975–76 game log
October: 3–0 (home: 3–0; road: 0–0)

Game	Date	Team	Score	High points	High rebounds	High assists	Location Attendance	Record
1	October 24	Houston	W 109–94				Boston Garden	1–0
2	October 29	Golden State	W 115–106				Boston Garden	2–0
3	October 31	Portland	W 112–94				Boston Garden	3–0

November : 6–6 (home: 3–3; road: 3–3)

Game	Date	Team	Score	High points	High rebounds	High assists	Location Attendance	Record
4	November 1	@ Chicago	L 82–84				Chicago Stadium	3–1
5	November 5	Buffalo	W 105–95				Boston Garden	4–1
6	November 7	@ Milwaukee	L 101–104	Dave Cowens (28)			MECCA Arena	4–2
7	November 8	@ Detroit	W 118–104				Cobo Arena	5–2
8	November 11	Atlanta	L 91–100	Jo Jo White (24)			Hartford Civic Center	5–3
9	November 13	@ Washington	L 107–110				Capital Centre	5–4
10	November 14	Philadelphia	L 109–119				Boston Garden	5–5
11	November 15	@ Buffalo	W 112–110				Buffalo Memorial Auditorium	6–5
12	November 21	New York	W 110–101				Boston Garden	7–5
13	November 23	@ Cleveland	W 105–90				Richfield Coliseum	8–5
14	November 26	Seattle	L 109–110				Boston Garden	8–6
15	November 28	Atlanta	W 114–107				Boston Garden	9–6

1975–76 schedule

== Playoffs ==
1976 playoff game log
Conference Semifinals: 4–2 (home: 3–0; road: 1–2)

Game	Date	Team	Score	High points	High rebounds	High assists	Location Attendance	Series
1	April 21	Buffalo	W 107–98	Dave Cowens (30)	Dave Cowens (17)	Jo Jo White (8)	Boston Garden; 13,919	1–0
2	April 23	Buffalo	W 101–96	Dave Cowens (27)	Dave Cowens (18)	Charlie Scott (6)	Boston Garden; 15,320	2–0
3	April 25	@ Buffalo	L 93–98	Jo Jo White (26)	Dave Cowens (14)	Charlie Scott (7)	Buffalo Memorial Auditorium; 12,079	2–1
4	April 28	@ Buffalo	L 122–124	Dave Cowens (29)	Dave Cowens (26)	Jo Jo White (11)	Buffalo Memorial Auditorium; 16,193	2–2
5	April 30	Buffalo	W 99–88	Dave Cowens (30)	Paul Silas (22)	Jo Jo White (6)	Boston Garden; 15,320	3–2
6	May 2	@ Buffalo	W 104–100	Jo Jo White (23)	Paul Silas (18)	Charlie Scott (8)	Buffalo Memorial Auditorium; 16,261	4–2

Conference Finals: 4–2 (home: 3–0; road: 1–2)

Game	Date	Team	Score	High points	High rebounds	High assists	Location Attendance	Series
1	May 5	Cleveland	W 111–99	John Havlicek (26)	Dave Cowens (12)	Dave Cowens (7)	Boston Garden; 14,264	1–0
2	May 9	Cleveland	W 94–89	Jo Jo White (24)	Paul Silas (19)	three players tied (4)	Boston Garden; 12,098	2–0
3	May 11	@ Cleveland	L 78–83	Jo Jo White (22)	Paul Silas (21)	Jo Jo White (7)	Richfield Coliseum; 21,564	2–1
4	May 14	@ Cleveland	L 87–106	Jo Jo White (23)	Dave Cowens (18)	Dave Cowens (4)	Richfield Coliseum; 21,564	2–2
5	May 16	Cleveland	W 99–94	Dave Cowens (26)	Paul Silas (13)	Dave Cowens (6)	Boston Garden; 12,951	3–2
6	May 18	@ Cleveland	W 94–87	Jo Jo White (29)	Dave Cowens (18)	White, Cowens (5)	Richfield Coliseum; 21,564	4–2

NBA Finals: 4–2 (home: 3–0; road: 1–2)

Game	Date	Team	Score	High points	High rebounds	High assists	Location Attendance	Series
1	May 23	Phoenix	W 98–87	Dave Cowens (25)	Dave Cowens (21)	Dave Cowens (10)	Boston Garden; 15,320	1–0
2	May 27	Phoenix	W 105–90	John Havlicek (23)	Paul Silas (17)	Jo Jo White (9)	Boston Garden; 15,320	2–0
3	May 30	@ Phoenix	L 98–105	Jo Jo White (24)	Dave Cowens (17)	Charlie Scott (5)	Arizona Veterans Memorial Coliseum; 12,284	2–1
4	June 2	@ Phoenix	L 107–109	Jo Jo White (25)	Paul Silas (14)	Jo Jo White (5)	Arizona Veterans Memorial Coliseum; 13,306	2–2
5	June 4	Phoenix	W 128–126 (3OT)	Jo Jo White (33)	Dave Cowens (19)	Jo Jo White (9)	Boston Garden; 15,320	3–2
6	June 6	@ Phoenix	W 87–80	Charlie Scott (25)	Dave Cowens (17)	Jo Jo White (6)	Arizona Veterans Memorial Coliseum; 13,306	4–2

1976 schedule
