= Bob Lanier =

American basketball player (1948–2022)

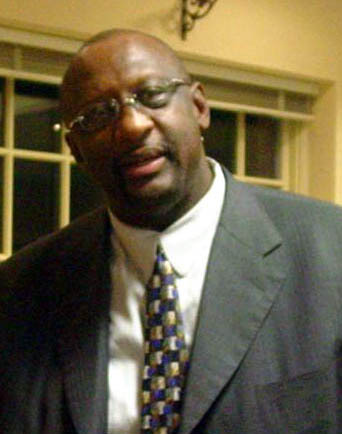
- Lanier in 2004

Personal information
- Born: September 10, 1948 Buffalo, New York, U.S.
- Died: May 10, 2022 (aged 73) Phoenix, Arizona, U.S.
- Listed height: 6 ft 10 in (2.08 m)
- Listed weight: 250 lb (113 kg)

Career information
- High school: Bennett (Buffalo, New York)
- College: St. Bonaventure (1967–1970)
- NBA draft: 1970: 1st round, 1st overall pick
- Drafted by: Detroit Pistons
- Playing career: 1970–1984
- Position: Center
- Number: 16

Career history

Playing
- 1970–1980: Detroit Pistons
- 1980–1984: Milwaukee Bucks

Career highlights
- 8× NBA All-Star (1972–1975, 1977–1979, 1982); NBA All-Star Game MVP (1974); NBA All-Rookie First Team (1971); No. 16 retired by Detroit Pistons; No. 16 retired by Milwaukee Bucks; Consensus first-team All-American (1970); Consensus second-team All-American (1968); Second-team All-American – AP, NABC, UPI (1969); No. 31 retired by St. Bonaventure Bonnies

Career statistics
- Points: 19,248 (20.1 ppg)
- Rebounds: 9,698 (10.1 rpg)
- Blocks: 1,100 (1.5 bpg)
- Stats at NBA.com
- Stats at Basketball Reference
- Basketball Hall of Fame
- Collegiate Basketball Hall of Fame

Robert Jerry Lanier Jr. (September 10, 1948 – May 10, 2022) was an American professional basketball player. He played center for the Detroit Pistons and the Milwaukee Bucks of the National Basketball Association (NBA). Lanier was inducted into the Naismith Memorial Basketball Hall of Fame in 1992.

In 14 NBA seasons, Lanier played in eight NBA All-Star Games and was named Most Valuable Player of the 1974 game. His accomplishments came despite a long history with knee injuries. He had his No. 16 jersey retired by both the Pistons and the Bucks and his No. 31 jersey retired by St. Bonaventure University, for whom he played college basketball. After retiring from playing he was an assistant coach for the Golden State Warriors, and briefly served as their interim head coach. He went on to work as an NBA Cares Global Ambassador.

== Early life ==
Robert Jerry Lanier Jr. was born on September 10, 1948, in Buffalo, New York. He was the son of Robert Sr. and Nannette Lanier. His mother raised him in the Seventh-day Adventist Church.

Growing up, Lanier initially was rejected in his efforts to play basketball. When he tried out to play for his grammar school team, Lanier was told by a coach that his feet (size 11 at age 11) were too large for him to become a successful athlete. Although he was 6 feet 5 inches (1.96 m) tall by age 16, Lanier did not make the varsity basketball squad in his sophomore year at Bennett High School because he was deemed to be too clumsy by coach Nick Mogavero.

During his junior year, he was encouraged to try out again by new coach Fred Schwepker, who taught Lanier as a student in his biology class. Lanier tried out again and made the team. He averaged 21.5 points and was named to the All-City team as a junior. In his senior year, he averaged 25.0 points and he earned All-Western New York State honors. In each year, he led Bennett to a Buffalo city title. Lanier graduated in 1966.

Lanier was recruited by more than 100 universities; however, he chose to attend St. Bonaventure University, approximately an hour and a half away from his home. There, he played for coach Larry Weise. "There was recruiting competition, but the advantage I had, and what I sold, was that his parents could come watch him play", said Coach Weise. "He picked St. Bonaventure. His parents were at every game."

In 2009 as The Buffalo News celebrated 50 years of All-Western New York (WNY) basketball selections, Lanier, who was a 1965–66 All-WNY first team selection was named to the All-time All-WNY team along with Christian Laettner, Curtis Aiken, Paul Harris and Mel Montgomery.

== College career ==
Lanier was a three-time All-America selection (1968–1970). As a senior in 1970, he led the St. Bonaventure to the NCAA Final Four. Near the end of the regional championship game, he injured his knee in a collision with Villanova's Chris Ford and did not play in St. Bonaventure's national semifinal loss to Jacksonville University.

That year, Lanier was named the Coach and Athlete Magazine player of the year and the Eastern College Athletic Conference's Player of the Year. Since 2007 their basketball court has been called the “ Bob Lanier court”

=== Freshman year (1966–1967) ===
Per NCAA rules at the time, Lanier played on the freshman team during his first year at St. Bonaventure.

=== Sophomore year (1967–1968) ===
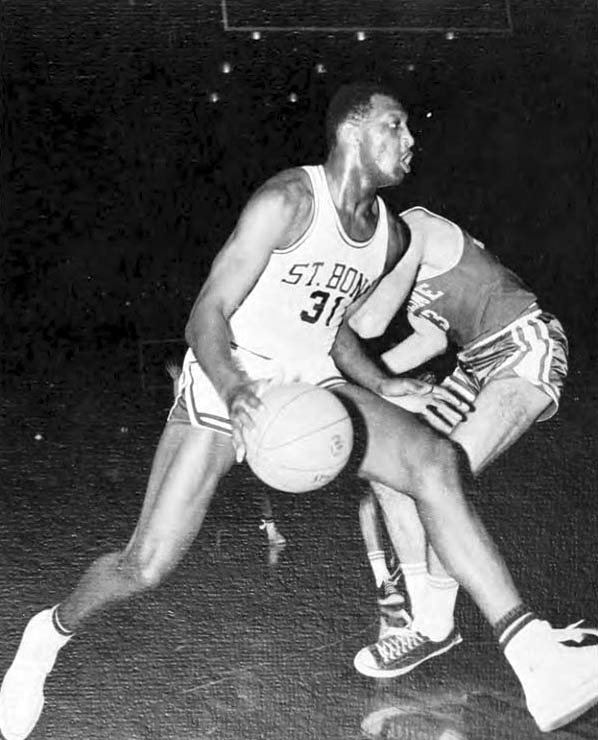
Lanier at St. Bonaventure

As a 6 ft 10 in (2.08 m) sophomore in the 1967–68 season, Lanier made an immediate impact and gained national recognition. Lanier led St. Bonaventure (13–9 in the previous season) to an undefeated regular season (26–0) and a number three final poll ranking. He averaged 26.2 points and 15.6 rebounds per game for the season. Against Loyola Maryland, Lanier had 27 rebounds, leading St. Bonaventure to a 94–78 victory.

In the 23-team 1968 NCAA tournament, Lanier led St. Bonaventure to a 102–93 victory over Boston College and coach Bob Cousy. The Bonnies were then defeated 91–72 by North Carolina and coach Dean Smith in the East Regional semifinal, ending their undefeated season. Lanier had 32 points and 15 rebounds in the victory over Boston College and 23 points with 9 rebounds in the North Carolina loss. Lanier then fouled out, scoring 18 points with 13 rebounds in the third-place East Region game; St. Bonaventure lost, 92–75, to Columbia.

Lanier was named a second-team All-American, behind Lew Alcindor (who later changed his name to Kareem Abdul-Jabbar) at center.

=== Junior year (1968–1969) ===
In the 1968–69 season, St. Bonaventure finished with a 17–7 record after starting the season 3–5. Against Seton Hall, Lanier scored 51 points, setting the single-game scoring record for St. Bonaventure. Lanier averaged 27.3 points and 15.6 rebounds in 24 games. Lanier was again named a second-team All-American behind Lew Alcindor at center. During his junior year, Lanier was approached by representatives of the American Basketball Association's New York Nets, who reportedly offered him $1.2 million to leave school early and join the ABA. However, following his father's advice, Lanier chose to remain in school.

=== Senior year: NCAA Tournament and knee injury (1969–1970) ===
Lanier averaged 29.2 points and 16.0 rebounds as St. Bonaventure finished the 1969–70 regular season 25–1 (with the only loss at Villanova 64–62) and a number three national ranking. In the 25-team 1970 NCAA tournament, Lanier led St. Bonaventure to an 80–72 victory over Davidson College with 28 points and 15 rebounds. He had 24 points and 19 rebounds in an 80–68 victory over NC State, and had 26 points and 14 rebounds in the 97–74 victory over Villanova as St. Bonaventure advanced to the Final Four.

However, Lanier injured his knee near the end of the regional championship game in a collision with Villanova's Chris Ford. The injury was severe enough that he could not play in the Final Four and eventually required the first of eight knee surgeries he would undergo throughout his life. In the Final Four, the Bonnies lost to Jacksonville University, whose center was future Hall of Famer Artis Gilmore. St. Bonaventure was whistled for 32 personal fouls and was outscored 37–15 at the free-throw line in the 91–83 loss. In the third-place game, the Bonnies lost to New Mexico State, finishing the season 25–3.

"Every year at this time you start thinking about it and my players start thinking about it," reflected Coach Larry Weise at age 81. "We have a reunion every three, four years and it's the same with them. It was a magical moment in our lives, no question. In our hearts, we knew we were good enough to win the championship." "I think I appreciate it even more than my (college) teammates," Lanier reflected on the Final Four in 1985, "because I had a basis for comparison. It wasn't the money, or who got the 'numbers' like in the NBA. We weren't any big stars, it was a couple of guys from Buffalo and a guy from Troy all blending together."

Lanier was named a first-team All-American at center alongside future Hall of Famers Dan Issel (center, Kentucky), Pete Maravich (point guard, LSU) and Calvin Murphy (point guard, Niagara), along with College Basketball Hall of Famer Rick Mount (shooting guard, Purdue). Lanier graduated from St. Bonaventure with a degree in business administration. Lanier holds St. Bonaventure records for scoring and rebounding, averaging 27.6 points and 15.7 rebounds, with 57% shooting in 75 career games.

In March 2018, St. Bonaventure won its first game in the NCAA tournament since 1970, defeating UCLA. Coach Mark Schmidt said, "It can't get better. Our guys just fought, we persevered. ... In 1970, you know, Bob Lanier got hurt, and didn't have a chance to play UCLA and ... this is for him." "When I got the job here 11 years ago, we hear the stories about 1970," Schmidt said. "And everybody talks about if Lanier was healthy, they would have taken on UCLA. This victory is for those guys."

== Professional career ==
=== Detroit Pistons (1970–1980) ===
Lanier was the first overall pick by the National Basketball Association's Detroit Pistons in the 1970 NBA draft. He was also a territorial pick by the New York Nets of the American Basketball Association in the 1970 ABA Draft.

Lanier played while still recovering from surgery. He was named to the 1971 NBA All-Rookie Team, averaging 15.6 points and 8.1 rebounds for the 45–37 Pistons in 24 minutes per game under Coach Butch van Breda Kolff. "I wasn't healthy when I got to the league," Lanier reflected. "I shouldn't have played my first year. But there was so much pressure from them to play, I would have been much better off—and our team would have been much better served—if I had just sat out that year and worked on my knee. My knee was so sore every single day that it was ludicrous to be doing what I was doing." Lanier rehabilitated his knee with the help of Coach van Breda Kolff, who had Lanier stay at his beachfront house for 2½ weeks to run in the sand and strengthen his knee and legs.

Lanier became a star for Detroit, playing alongside teammate Dave Bing. He averaged more than 21 points per game for each of the next eight seasons, with a high mark of 25.7 PPG in the 1971–72 season. Lanier averaged more than 11 rebounds per game in seven straight seasons. On November 28, 1972, Lanier scored 48 points, a Pistons franchise record to this day for points scored in a game by a center, during a 129–96 win over the Portland Trail Blazers. On January 15, 1974, Lanier led all scorers in that season's NBA All Star Game with 24 points, and was named the All-Star Game MVP.

Detroit was a franchise in constant transition. Lanier played under eight coaches in ten seasons: Butch van Breda Kolff (1970–1971), Terry Dischinger (1971), Earl Lloyd (1971–1972), Ray Scott (1972–1975), Herb Brown (1975–1977), Bob Kauffman (1977–1978), Dick Vitale (1978–1979), and Richie Adubato (1979–1980). Each coach was hired or fired in mid-season. Of his time in Detroit, Lanier said, "I think '73–74 was our best team [52–30]. We had Dave [Bing], Stu Lantz, John Mengelt, Chris Ford, Don Adams, Curtis Rowe, George Trapp. But then for some reason, they traded six guys off that team before the following year. I just didn't feel we ever had the leadership... That was a rough time because, at the end of every year, you'd be so despondent."

Lanier's latter years in Detroit were marred by recurring injuries, as he never played more than 64 games in any of his last four seasons as a Piston.

In his ten seasons with the Detroit Pistons, Lanier averaged a double-double 22.7 points, 11.8 rebounds, 3.3 assists, 2.0 blocks and 1.2 steals in 681 games. Lanier is the Pistons' all-time leader in scoring average (22.7 ppg); he ranks second in total rebounds (8,063), third in total points (15,488), and was voted to seven All-Star games.

=== Milwaukee Bucks (1980–1984) ===
On February 4, 1980, Lanier was traded by the Pistons to the Milwaukee Bucks for Kent Benson and a 1980 first-round draft pick (which the Pistons used to select Larry Drew). On April 20 of that year, Lanier scored 19 points and grabbed 15 rebounds in a Game 7 loss against the Seattle SuperSonics in the Western Conference Semifinals (the final season for the Bucks in that conference).

On May 5, 1982, Lanier's 27 points led the Bucks to a Game 5 playoff victory against the Philadelphia 76ers. The Bucks eventually lost the series. Lanier's 27 points represented his highest single post-season game point total for the Bucks. In Lanier's five seasons with the Bucks, they won the Midwest Division championship each year under Coach Don Nelson, with Lanier playing alongside teammates Marques Johnson, Sidney Moncrief, Quinn Buckner, Junior Bridgeman, and Dave Cowens. Still highly effective, but with aging knees, Lanier played a key role with the Bucks while averaging nearly 10 minutes less per game in his Milwaukee tenure that he had in Detroit (36.2 to 26.8).

Of going to Milwaukee, Lanier said, "I wanted the trade. I got to Milwaukee... and the people gave me a standing ovation and really made me feel welcome. It was the start of a positive change. I just wish I had played with that kind of talent around me when I was young. But if I had had Marques [Johnson] and Sidney [Moncrief] and all of them around me? Damn." Lanier officially retired from the Milwaukee Bucks on September 24, 1984. He cited reoccurring knee injuries as the reason for his retirement. In 278 games with the Bucks, Lanier averaged 26 minutes, 13.5 points, 5.9 rebounds, 2.7 assists, and 1.0 steals per game. He played in the 1982 All-Star Game with Milwaukee. During Lanier's five-season tenure, the Bucks advanced as far as the Eastern Conference Finals twice.

=== NBA career summary ===
Over his fourteen-season NBA career, Lanier played in 959 games, averaging 20.1 points, 10.1 rebounds, 3.1 assists, 1.5 blocks, and 1.1 steals per game. He scored 19,248 total points and had 9,698 total rebounds. In 67 career playoff games, Lanier averaged 18.6 points, 9.7 rebounds, 3.5 assists, and 1.5 blocks. Lanier played in eight NBA All-Star Games; he never appeared in an NBA Finals game.

"Bob probably wasn't as good a total player as he could have been because of the knee injury," said Hall of Famer Willis Reed. Reed acknowledged that Lanier "probably was one of the best all-around big men ever to play the game of basketball." Lanier was known across the league as being tenacious, and was referred to as an "enforcer" due to his physical style of play. His intensity sometimes spilled over from playing into fighting, as he knocked out Atlanta's Bob Christian in 1971 and broke the nose of Detroit's Bill Laimbeer in 1983. In the 1977 NBA Playoffs, in the third game of a best of three series against Golden State Warriors, the game was marred by a 3rd quarter fight with Charles Dudley of Golden State tangling with Eric Money of the Pistons. The fight spilled into the stands as a Warriors fan punching Piston M. L. Carr and Lanier then decking the fan. Reflective of the different era in the game, personal fouls were called on Dudley and Money, and the game resumed with the Warriors winning 109–101.

== Coaching career ==
=== Golden State Warriors (1994–1995) ===
From 1994–95, Lanier served as an assistant coach for the Golden State Warriors under his former coach, Don Nelson. After Nelson resigned, Lanier was named interim head coach on February 13, 1995. He compiled a 12–25 win–loss record in 37 games and the Warriors finished 26–56 overall.

== Other ventures ==
Lanier owned and operated Bob Lanier Enterprises, Inc., a promotional marketing company which was a member of the Proforma network.

Lanier was a spokesperson and chairman of the NBA's "Stay In School" program (later renamed Read to Achieve) from 1989 to 1994.

From 2005 to 2022, Lanier was the NBA Cares Global Ambassador. Lanier routinely worked with youth-serving programs that supported education, youth, and family development, and health-related causes.

== In popular culture ==
Lanier appeared as a member of the Detroit team in the cult classic basketball film The Fish That Saved Pittsburgh in 1979 alongside Pistons teammates Chris Ford, Eric Money, John Shumate, Kevin Porter, and Leon Douglas.

Lanier was hired as basketball coach for the film White Men Can't Jump. Lanier was impressed with lead actors Woody Harrelson and Wesley Snipes, suggesting both reached a Division II college basketball skill level. He also noted that between the two of them, Harrelson was the better player.

Lanier was also mentioned in the 1980 movie "Airplane!" when an exasperated Kareem Abdul Jabbar admonished Joey, "Tell your old man to drag Walton and Lanier up and down the court for 48 minutes!"

== Personal life and death ==
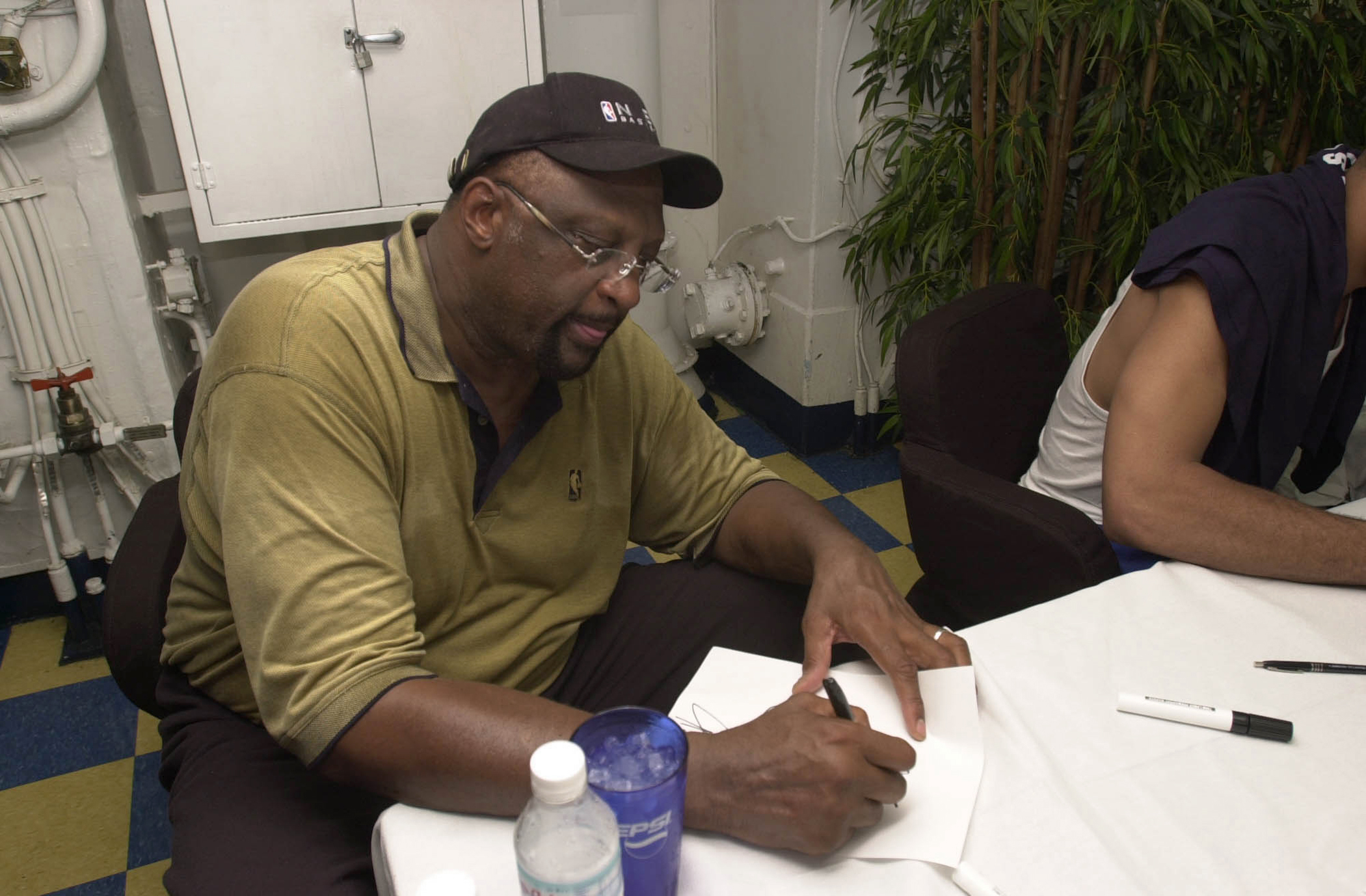
Lanier signing autographs for USS Nimitz sailors in 2003

Lanier was married and divorced twice and had five children: Walter “Jack” Lanier, Kimberly Lanier, Tiffany Lanier, Robert Lanier III, and Khalia Lanier. At the time of his death, he had 7 grandchildren.

The knee injuries that plagued Lanier's later career worsened as he aged. He underwent several surgeries after his retirement, the last being in 2017.

At the Naismith Memorial Basketball Hall of Fame in Springfield, Massachusetts, visitors are able to compare the size of their foot to that of Lanier. The largest shoe ever created by shoe company Allen Edmonds was a size 22 for Lanier.

In September 2018, Lanier shared one of his most notable NBA memories: "...when I was still playing in Milwaukee and I was getting gas at a station on, I think it was Center St. A guy came up to me and said, 'My dad is sick. And you're his favorite player. Could you come up to the house and say hello to him? The house is right next door.' So I went over, I went upstairs. The guy was laying there in his bed. His son said, 'This is Bob,' and he was like, 'I know.' And he just had a little smile, a twinkle in his eye. And he grabbed my hand and squeezed it. And we said a little prayer. About two weeks later, his dad had died. And he left a card at the Bucks office, just saying 'Thank you for making one of my dad's final days into a good day.'"

Lanier died on May 10, 2022, after a brief illness. He was 73.

== Honors ==
- Inducted into the St. Bonaventure Athletics Hall of Fame in 1975.
- St. Bonaventure retired Lanier's No. 31 jersey.
- In 1978, Lanier was selected by the Professional Basketball Writers Association (PBWA) as the recipient of the J. Walter Kennedy Citizenship Award for outstanding community service.
- In 1981, the YMCA organization presented Lanier with the "Jackie Robinson Award." The award is given for service to youth, good citizenship and leadership.
- Lanier was inducted into the Greater Buffalo Sports Hall of Fame in 1991.
- Lanier's No. 16 jersey has been retired by both the Detroit Pistons and Milwaukee Bucks. The Bucks retired his jersey in 1984. The Pistons retired his jersey in 1993.
- Lanier was enshrined into the Naismith Basketball Hall of Fame in 1992.
- In 2000, Lanier was the recipient of the Congressional "Horizon & Leadership Award." The award is presented annually by the Joint Leadership Commission of the United States Congress and the Board of Directors of The Congressional Award Foundation to individuals who have made an exceptional impact on the lives of America's young people.
- In 2006, Lanier was inducted into the College Basketball Hall of Fame.
- In 2007, Lanier received the National Civil Rights Museum Sports Legacy Award. It was awarded for his significant contribution to civil and human rights internationally in the spirit of Dr. Martin Luther King Jr.
- The basketball court at Lanier's alma mater, St. Bonaventure, was named in his honor in 2007. "Bob Lanier Court" is in the Reilly Center Arena. Said the 2007 press release, "Bob Lanier elevated an already established St. Bona basketball program to the next level and is an ideal ambassador of the sport. When we were thinking about names for the court he was the obvious choice and a perfect fit."
- Lanier was named co-recipient of the 2009 "The Mannie Jackson – Basketball's Human Spirit Award." The award was given by the Naismith Basketball Hall of Fame in recognition of his passion for the game of basketball and his continued commitment to community service.
- Following Lanier's death, Detroit Pistons players wore a black stripe with No. 16 across the right shoulder (as seen from the front) of their jerseys for the 2022–23 NBA season.

== NBA career statistics ==
Legend
GP	Games played	GS	Games started	MPG	Minutes per game
FG%	Field goal percentage	3P%	3-point field goal percentage	FT%	Free throw percentage
RPG	Rebounds per game	APG	Assists per game	SPG	Steals per game
BPG	Blocks per game	PPG	Points per game	**Bold**	Career high

=== Regular season ===
Year	Team	GP	GS	MPG	FG%	3P%	FT%	RPG	APG	SPG	BPG	PPG
1970–71	Detroit	**82**	—	24.6	.455	—	.726	8.1	1.8	—	—	15.6
1971–72	Detroit	80	—	38.7	.493	—	.768	14.2	3.1	—	—	**25.7**
1972–73	Detroit	81	—	38.9	.490	—	.773	**14.9**	3.2	—	—	23.8
1973–74	Detroit	81	—	37.6	.504	—	.797	13.3	4.2	**1.4**	**3.0**	22.5
1974–75	Detroit	76	—	**39.3**	.510	—	.802	12.0	**4.6**	1.0	2.3	24.0
1975–76	Detroit	64	—	36.9	.532	—	.768	11.7	3.4	1.2	1.3	21.3
1976–77	Detroit	64	—	38.2	.534	—	**.818**	11.6	3.3	1.1	2.0	25.3
1977–78	Detroit	63	—	36.7	.537	—	.772	11.3	3.4	1.3	1.5	24.5
1978–79	Detroit	53	—	34.6	.515	—	.749	9.3	2.6	.9	1.4	23.6
1979–80	Detroit	37	—	37.6	.546	.000	.781	10.1	3.3	1.0	1.6	21.7
1979–80	Milwaukee	26	—	28.4	.519	**1.000**	.785	6.9	2.4	1.4	1.1	15.7
1980–81	Milwaukee	67	—	26.2	.525	**1.000**	.751	6.2	2.7	1.1	1.2	14.3
1981–82	Milwaukee	74	72	26.8	.558	.000	.752	5.2	3.0	1.0	.8	13.5
1982–83	Milwaukee	39	35	25.1	.491	.000	.684	5.1	2.7	.9	.6	10.7
1983–84	Milwaukee	72	72	27.9	**.572**	.000	.708	6.3	2.6	.8	.7	13.6
Career		959	—	33.5	.514	.154	.767	10.1	3.1	1.1	1.5	20.1
All-Star		8	0	15.1	.582	—	.833	5.6	1.5	.5	.6	9.2

=== Playoffs ===
Year	Team	GP	GS	MPG	FG%	3P%	FT%	RPG	APG	SPG	BPG	PPG
1974	Detroit	7	—	**43.3**	.507	—	.789	15.3	3.0	.6	2.0	26.3
1975	Detroit	3	—	42.7	.510	—	.750	10.7	**6.3**	1.3	**4.0**	20.3
1976	Detroit	9	—	39.9	.552	—	**.900**	12.7	3.3	.9	2.3	26.1
1977	Detroit	3	—	39.3	**.630**	—	.842	**16.7**	2.0	1.0	2.3	**28.0**
1980	Milwaukee	7	—	36.6	.515	—	.738	9.3	4.4	1.0	1.1	19.3
1981	Milwaukee	7	—	33.7	.588	—	.719	7.4	4.0	**1.7**	1.1	17.6
1982	Milwaukee	6	—	35.3	.513	.000	.560	7.5	3.7	1.3	.8	16.0
1983	Milwaukee	9	—	27.8	.573	—	.600	7.0	2.6	.6	1.6	13.7
1984	Milwaukee	**16**	—	31.2	.480	—	.886	7.3	3.4	.7	.6	12.7
Career		67	—	35.2	.532	.000	.768	9.6	3.5	.9	1.5	18.6

== Head coaching record ==
=== NBA ===
Team	Year	G	W	L	W–L%	Finish	PG	PW	PL	PW–L%	Result
Golden State	1994–95	37	12	25	.324	6th in Pacific	—	—	—	—	Missed playoffs
Career		37	12	25	.324		0	0	0	–	

== See also ==
- List of National Basketball Association career rebounding leaders
- List of NCAA Division I men's basketball players with 2,000 points and 1,000 rebounds
