= 1971 NCAA University Division basketball championship game =

American collegiate basketball final

1971 NCAA Tournament Championship Game
National championship game
UCLA Bruins	Villanova Wildcats
Pac-8	Independent
(28–1)	(27–6)
68	62
Head coach: John Wooden	Head coach: Jack Kraft
- AP: 1
- Coaches: 1
- AP: 19
- Coaches: 17
	1st half	2nd half	Total
UCLA Bruins	45	23	68
Villanova Wildcats	37	25	62
- Date: March 27, 1971
- Venue: Astrodome, Houston, Texas
- MVP: Howard Porter, Villanova (vacated)
- Favorite: UCLA
- Attendance: 31,765

United States TV coverage
- Network: NBC
- Announcers: Curt Gowdy and Tom Hawkins

The 1971 NCAA University Division Basketball Championship Game was the finals of the 1971 NCAA University Division basketball tournament and it determined the national champion for the 1970-71 NCAA University Division men's basketball season. The game was played on March 27, 1971, at the Astrodome in Houston, Texas and featured the four-time defending national champion UCLA Bruins of the Pacific-8 Conference, and the independent Villanova Wildcats.

The Bruins narrowly defeated the Wildcats to win their fifth consecutive national championship. However, the Wildcats would later vacate their appearance in the title game due to issues with the eligibility of Howard Porter.

== Participating teams ==
=== UCLA Bruins ===
- West
  - UCLA 91, BYU 73
  - UCLA 73, Long Beach State 55
- Final Four
  - UCLA 68, Kansas 60

=== Villanova Wildcats ===
- East
  - Villanova 93, Saint Joseph's 75
  - Villanova 85, Fordham 75
  - Villanova 90, Penn 47
- Final Four
  - Villanova 92, Western Kentucky 89 (2OT)

== Game summary ==
NBC

March 27, 1971

#1 UCLA Bruins 68, #19 ~~Villanova Wildcats~~ 62
Scoring by half: 45-37, 23-25
Pts: Steve Patterson 29; Rebs: Sidney Wicks 9 Asts: Sidney Wicks 7	Pts: Howard Porter 25; Rebs: Howard Porter 8 Asts: Chris Ford 10

Astrodome, Houston, Texas
Attendance: 31,765

== Aftermath ==
The NCAA vacated 23 of Villanova's wins in the 1970–71 season including its appearance in the 1971 NCAA Tournament due to issues with the eligibility of Howard Porter.

This would be Villanova's last appearance in the title game until 1985, where they would go on a Cinderella run to the national title.
