= 1971 NCAA Men's Basketball All-Americans =

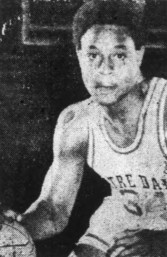
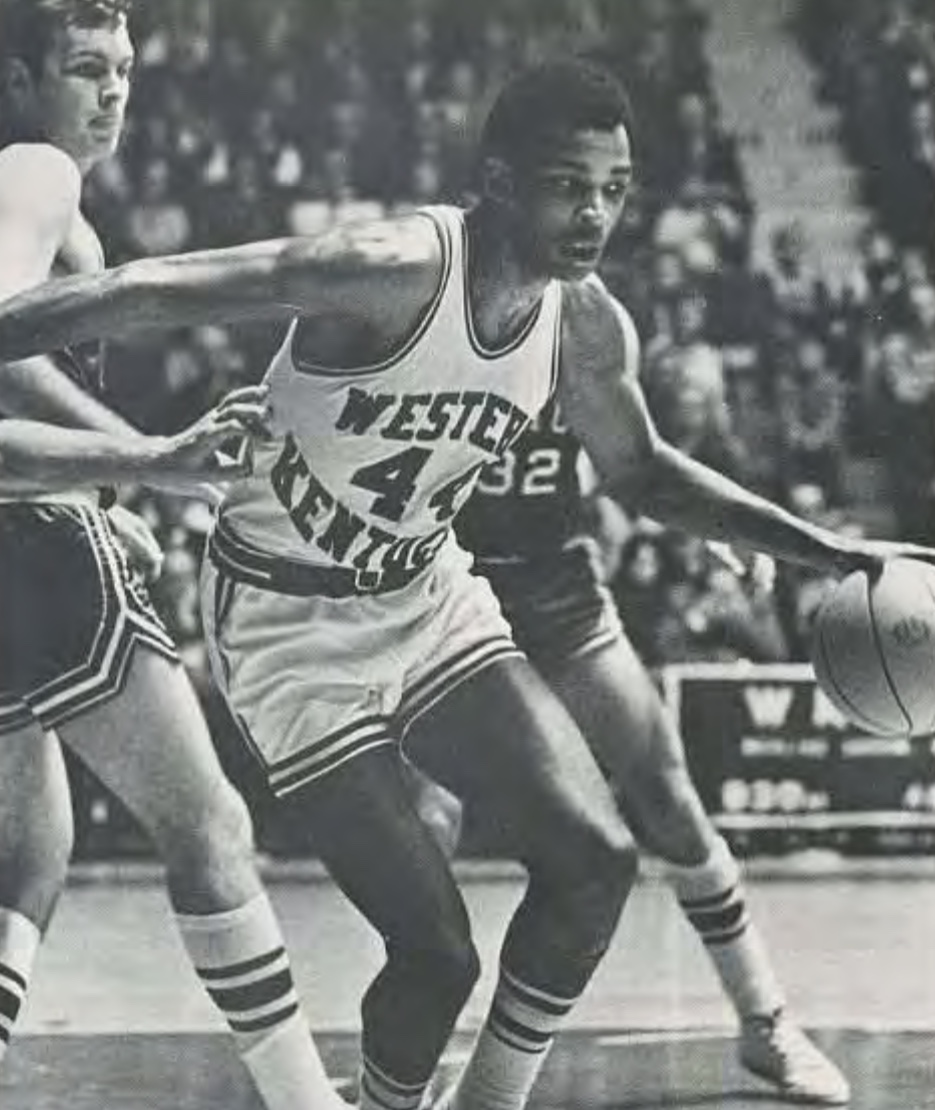
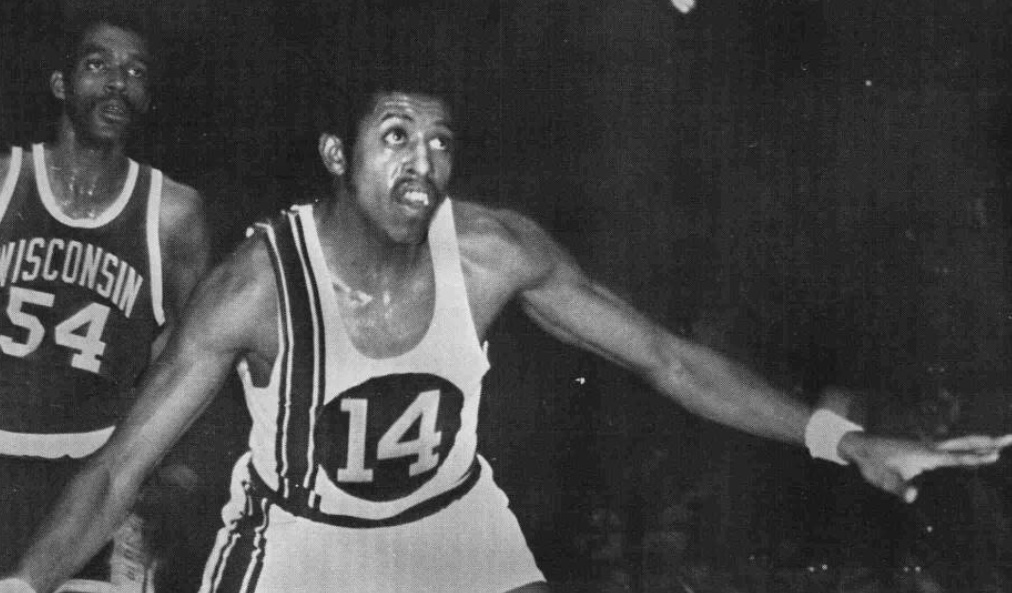
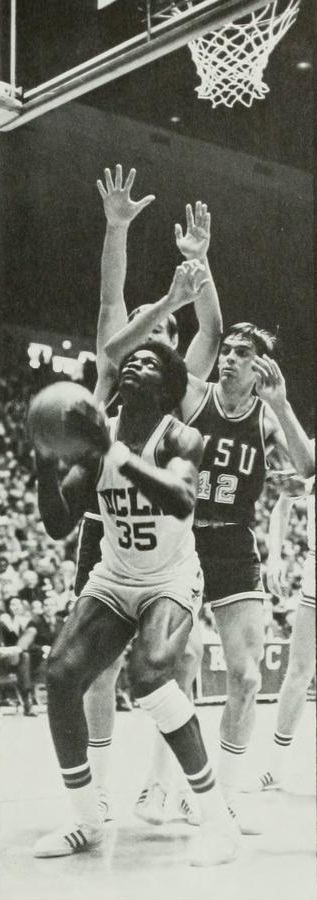
- Members of the 1971 Consensus All-America first team. Clockwise from upper left: Carr, McDaniels, Wicks, Meminger (not pictured: Gilmore).
- Awarded for: 1970–71 NCAA University Division men's basketball season

The consensus 1971 College Basketball All-American team, as determined by aggregating the results of four major All-American teams. To earn "consensus" status, a player must win honors from a majority of the following teams: the Associated Press, the USBWA, The United Press International and the National Association of Basketball Coaches.

== 1971 Consensus All-America team ==
Consensus First Team
Player	Position	Class	Team
Austin Carr	G	Senior	Notre Dame
Artis Gilmore	C	Senior	Jacksonville
Jim McDaniels	C	Senior	Western Kentucky
Dean Meminger	G	Senior	Marquette
Sidney Wicks	F	Senior	UCLA

Consensus Second Team
Player	Position	Class	Team
Ken Durrett	F	Senior	La Salle
Johnny Neumann	F	Sophomore	Mississippi
Howard Porter	F	Senior	Villanova
John Roche	G	Senior	South Carolina
Curtis Rowe	F	Senior	UCLA

== Individual All-America teams ==
All-America Team
All-America Team	First team		Second team		Third team		Fourth Team	
All-America Team	Player	School	Player	School	Player	School	Player	School
Associated Press	Austin Carr	Notre Dame	Johnny Neumann	Mississippi	Fred Brown	Iowa	No fourth team	
Associated Press	Artis Gilmore	Jacksonville	Dave Robisch	Kansas	George McGinnis	Indiana	No fourth team	
Associated Press	Jim McDaniels	Western Kentucky	John Roche	South Carolina	Cliff Meely	Colorado	No fourth team	
Associated Press	Dean Meminger	Marquette	Curtis Rowe	UCLA	Howard Porter	Villanova	No fourth team	
Associated Press	Sidney Wicks	UCLA	Paul Westphal	Southern California	Rich Yunkus	Georgia Tech	No fourth team	
USBWA	Austin Carr	Notre Dame	Dennis Layton	Southern California	No third or fourth teams			
USBWA	Ken Durrett	La Salle	Jim McDaniels	Western Kentucky	No third or fourth teams			
USBWA	Artis Gilmore	Jacksonville	Cliff Meely	Colorado	No third or fourth teams			
USBWA	Dean Meminger	Marquette	Johnny Neumann	Mississippi	No third or fourth teams			
USBWA	Sidney Wicks	UCLA	John Roche	South Carolina	No third or fourth teams			
NABC	Austin Carr	Notre Dame	Ken Durrett	La Salle	Julius Erving	Massachusetts	Charlie Davis	Wake Forest
NABC	Artis Gilmore	Jacksonville	Johnny Neumann	Mississippi	George McGinnis	Indiana	Stan Love	Oregon
NABC	Jim McDaniels	Western Kentucky	Howard Porter	Villanova	Dave Robisch	Kansas	Cliff Meely	Colorado
NABC	Dean Meminger	Marquette	John Roche	South Carolina	Curtis Rowe	UCLA	Jim O'Brien	Boston College
NABC	Sidney Wicks	UCLA	Rich Yunkus	Georgia Tech	Paul Westphal	Southern California	Willie Sojourner	Weber State
UPI	Austin Carr	Notre Dame	Ken Durrett	La Salle	Julius Erving	Massachusetts	No fourth team	
UPI	Artis Gilmore	Jacksonville	Jim McDaniels	Western Kentucky	George McGinnis	Indiana	No fourth team	
UPI	Dean Meminger	Marquette	Johnny Neumann	Mississippi	Dave Robisch	Kansas	No fourth team	
UPI	John Roche	South Carolina	Howard Porter	Villanova	Paul Westphal	Southern California	No fourth team	
UPI	Sidney Wicks	UCLA	Curtis Rowe	UCLA	Charlie Yelverton	Fordham	No fourth team	

AP Honorable Mention:

- Henry Bibby, UCLA
- Corky Calhoun, Pennsylvania
- Jim Chones, Marquette
- Jim Cleamons, Ohio State
- Kresimir Cosic, Brigham Young
- Charlie Davis, Wake Forest
- Dwight Davis, Houston
- Randy Denton, Duke
- Ken Durrett, La Salle
- Jimmy England, Tennessee
- Julius Erving, Massachusetts
- Jeff Halliburton, Drake
- Willie Humes, Idaho State
- Jim Irving, Saint Louis
- Goo Kennedy, Texas Christian
- Ken Kowall, Ohio
- Dennis Layton, Southern California
- Dana Lewis, Tulsa
- Stan Love, Oregon
- John Mengelt, Auburn
- Tom Owens, South Carolina
- Tom Payne, Kentucky
- Gene Phillips, Southern Methodist
- Jim Price, Louisville
- Jackie Ridgle, California
- Marv Roberts, Utah State
- Al Sanders, Louisiana State
- Willie Sojourner, Weber State
- Marvin Stewart, Nebraska
- Joe Sutter, Davidson
- Claude Terry, Stanford
- George Trapp, Long Beach State
- Poo Welch, Houston
- Henry Wilmore, Michigan
- Dennis Wuycik, North Carolina
- Charlie Yelverton, Fordham

== See also ==
- 1970–71 NCAA University Division men's basketball season
