= 1973–74 Detroit Pistons season =

NBA team season

- Head coach: Ray Scott
- General manager: Ed Coil
- Owner: Fred Zollner
- Arena: Cobo Arena

Results
- Record: 52–30 (.634)
- Place: Division: 3rd (Midwest); Conference: 4th (Western)
- Playoff finish: Conference semifinals (lost to Bulls 3–4)
- Stats at Basketball Reference

Local media
- Television: WKBD-TV
- Radio: WJR

The 1973–74 Detroit Pistons season was the Detroit Pistons' 26th season in the NBA and 17th season in the city of Detroit. The team played at Cobo Arena in downtown Detroit.

The Pistons finished with a 52-30 (.634) record, 3rd place in the Midwest Division, only their second winning season since moving to Detroit in 1957. The team was led by guard Dave Bing (18.8 ppg, 6.9 apg, NBA All-Star) and center Bob Lanier (22.5 ppg, 13.3 rpg, NBA All-Star and NBA All-Star Game MVP). Pistons coach Ray Scott was recognized as the NBA Coach of the Year, the first black coach in the league to win the award. It wouldn't be until 1991 when Don Chaney won the award that another black coach was so honored.

Detroit advanced to the 1974 NBA Playoffs, the team's first playoff appearance since the 1967-68 Detroit Pistons season, losing the Western Conference semi-finals 4–3 to the Chicago Bulls, dropping the deciding 7th game 96–94 in Chicago. In the 7th game at Chicago Stadium, after a furious Detroit rally, Dennis Awtrey of the Bulls tipped an inbounds pass by Bing with 3 seconds remaining and Norm Van Lier dribbled out the clock to preserve the Chicago victory.

== Draft picks ==
Round	Pick	Player	Position	Nationality	College / Team
8	129	Ben Kelso	Guard	United States	Central Michigan

== Roster ==
Detroit Pistons roster
Players

Pos.	No.	Player	Height	Weight	DOB	From
SF	10	Don Adams	6 ft 6 in (1.98 m)	210 lb (95 kg)	1947-11-27	Northwestern
PG	21	Dave Bing	6 ft 3 in (1.91 m)	180 lb (82 kg)	1943-11-24	Syracuse
C	20	Jim Davis	6 ft 9 in (2.06 m)	225 lb (102 kg)	1941-12-18	Colorado
SG	42	Chris Ford	6 ft 5 in (1.96 m)	190 lb (86 kg)	1949-01-11	Villanova
SG	30	Ben Kelso	6 ft 3 in (1.91 m)	195 lb (88 kg)	1949-04-11	Central Michigan
C	16	Bob Lanier	6 ft 11 in (2.11 m)	250 lb (113 kg)	1948-09-10	St. Bonaventure
SG	22	Stu Lantz	6 ft 3 in (1.91 m)	175 lb (79 kg)	1946-07-13	Nebraska
SG	15	John Mengelt	6 ft 2 in (1.88 m)	195 lb (88 kg)	1949-10-16	Auburn
SF	33	Bob Nash	6 ft 7 in (2.01 m)	195 lb (88 kg)	1950-08-24	Hawaiʻi
SF	8	Willie Norwood	6 ft 7 in (2.01 m)	220 lb (100 kg)	1947-08-08	Alcorn State
PF	18	Curtis Rowe	6 ft 7 in (2.01 m)	225 lb (102 kg)	1949-07-02	UCLA
PF	31	George Trapp	6 ft 8 in (2.03 m)	205 lb (93 kg)	1948-07-11	Long Beach State

Coaches
Head coach
- Ray Scott

Legend
- (DP) Unsigned draft pick
- (FA) Free agent
- (S) Suspended
- Injured

Roster
Updated: October 8, 1973

== Regular season ==
=== Season standings ===
Midwest Division	W	L	PCT	GB	Home	Road	Neutral	Div
y-Milwaukee Bucks	59	23	.720	–	31–7	24–16	4–0	14–6
x-Chicago Bulls	54	28	.659	5	32–9	21–19	1–0	13–7
x-Detroit Pistons	52	30	.634	7	29–12	23–17	0–1	9–11
Kansas City–Omaha Kings	33	49	.402	26	20–21	13–28	–	4–16

#	Western Conference				
#	Team	W	L	PCT	GB
1	z-Milwaukee Bucks	59	23	.720	–
2	x-Chicago Bulls	54	28	.659	5
3	x-Detroit Pistons	52	30	.634	7
4	y-Los Angeles Lakers	47	35	.573	12
5	Golden State Warriors	44	38	.537	15
6	Seattle SuperSonics	36	46	.439	23
7	Kansas City–Omaha Kings	33	49	.402	26
8	Phoenix Suns	30	52	.366	29
9	Portland Trail Blazers	27	55	.329	32

=== Game log ===
1973–74 game log
#	Date	Opponent	Score	High points	Record
1	October 9	@ New York	100–101	Bob Lanier (29)	0–1
2	October 12	Atlanta	105–122	Bob Lanier (20)	1–1
3	October 13	@ Chicago	94–101	Bob Lanier (22)	1–2
4	October 14	@ Cleveland	95–83	Bob Lanier (20)	2–2
5	October 19	Milwaukee	96–94	Bob Lanier (28)	2–3
6	October 20	@ Houston	107–104	Bob Lanier (33)	3–3
7	October 24	@ Phoenix	115–99	Bob Lanier (23)	4–3
8	October 26	@ Los Angeles	92–94	Curtis Rowe (18)	4–4
9	October 27	@ Portland	111–98	Bob Lanier (32)	5–4
10	October 28	@ Seattle	115–93	Bing, Mengelt (21)	6–4
11	October 31	Seattle	107–114	Dave Bing (26)	7–4
12	November 2	Phoenix	107–114	Chris Ford (24)	8–4
13	November 3	@ Milwaukee	115–123 (OT)	Bob Lanier (28)	8–5
14	November 8	@ Atlanta	129–115	Don Adams (23)	9–5
15	November 10	N Boston	97–102	Bob Lanier (29)	9–6
16	November 14	Portland	111–108	Bob Lanier (41)	9–7
17	November 16	Kansas City–Omaha	98–125	Willie Norwood (15)	10–7
18	November 17	@ Buffalo	98–94	Bob Lanier (30)	11–7
19	November 18	Chicago	104–102	Bob Lanier (27)	11–8
20	November 21	Phoenix	104–107	Bob Lanier (29)	12–8
21	November 24	@ Chicago	112–114 (OT)	Bob Lanier (32)	12–9
22	November 28	Cleveland	96–91	Bing, Lanier (23)	12–10
23	November 30	@ Houston	95–110	Bob Lanier (19)	12–11
24	December 1	@ Phoenix	121–109	John Mengelt (30)	13–11
25	December 2	@ Los Angeles	114–108	Dave Bing (27)	14–11
26	December 4	@ Golden State	112–93	Dave Bing (27)	15–11
27	December 6	@ Seattle	110–108	Dave Bing (33)	16–11
28	December 8	Portland	91–106	Bob Lanier (28)	17–11
29	December 9	@ Kansas City–Omaha	86–80	Adams, Bing (19)	18–11
30	December 12	Los Angeles	96–114	Bob Lanier (33)	19–11
31	December 14	Philadelphia	96–93	Dave Bing (26)	19–12
32	December 15	@ Philadelphia	99–89	Bob Lanier (24)	20–12
33	December 16	@ Kansas City–Omaha	104–105	Dave Bing (22)	20–13
34	December 19	Chicago	87–89	Bob Lanier (30)	21–13
35	December 21	Golden State	104–107	George Trapp (21)	22–13
36	December 22	@ New York	88–99	Bob Lanier (35)	22–14
37	December 26	New York	96–91	Dave Bing (22)	22–15
38	December 28	Capital	93–102	Bob Lanier (30)	23–15
39	December 29	@ Chicago	103–108	Willie Norwood (29)	23–16
40	December 30	@ Milwaukee	98–91	Dave Bing (22)	24–16
41	January 2	Milwaukee	92–106	Bob Lanier (34)	25–16
42	January 4	Boston	101–106	Bob Lanier (29)	26–16
43	January 5	@ Capital	90–93	Dave Bing (21)	26–17
44	January 9	Los Angeles	94–123	Bob Lanier (32)	27–17
45	January 11	@ Cleveland	106–96	Curtis Rowe (28)	28–17
46	January 12	Cleveland	117–112 (OT)	Bob Lanier (32)	28–18
47	January 18	Chicago	95–113	Bob Lanier (32)	29–18
48	January 20	Kansas City–Omaha	79–105	George Trapp (21)	30–18
49	January 23	Portland	95–121	Curtis Rowe (20)	31–18
50	January 25	Houston	89–93	Bob Lanier (26)	32–18
51	January 26	Seattle	83–94	Bob Lanier (27)	33–18
52	January 27	@ Chicago	91–109	Bob Lanier (20)	33–19
53	January 30	Buffalo	96–111	Bob Lanier (36)	34–19
54	February 1	New York	91–96	Dave Bing (18)	35–19
55	February 3	@ Seattle	114–100	Bob Lanier (25)	36–19
56	February 5	@ Portland	104–102	Willie Norwood (27)	37–19
57	February 7	@ Golden State	110–86	Willie Norwood (27)	38–19
58	February 8	@ Phoenix	99–94	Bob Lanier (24)	39–19
59	February 12	Kansas City–Omaha	106–113	Willie Norwood (27)	40–19
60	February 14	Milwaukee	102–99	Dave Bing (19)	40–20
61	February 15	@ Buffalo	116–118	Bob Lanier (45)	40–21
62	February 17	@ Philadelphia	118–107	Bob Lanier (27)	41–21
63	February 19	@ Boston	97–107	Dave Bing (21)	41–22
64	February 20	Los Angeles	110–112	Bob Lanier (29)	42–22
65	February 22	Capital	83–84	Bob Lanier (24)	43–22
66	February 23	Phoenix	107–119	Bob Lanier (25)	44–22
67	February 24	@ Capital	84–94	Dave Bing (18)	44–23
68	February 26	Boston	86–83	Dave Bing (22)	44–24
69	February 28	@ Milwaukee	90–113	George Trapp (17)	44–25
70	March 1	Seattle	105–103	John Mengelt (24)	44–26
71	March 3	@ Portland	99–95	Bob Lanier (30)	45–26
72	March 5	@ Golden State	95–93	Dave Bing (23)	46–26
73	March 8	@ Los Angeles	113–129	Curtis Rowe (24)	46–27
74	March 10	@ Atlanta	116–111	Bob Lanier (31)	47–27
75	March 11	Golden State	120–108	Willie Norwood (19)	47–28
76	March 12	Golden State	108–113	Dave Bing (28)	48–28
77	March 15	Milwaukee	89–93	Don Adams (21)	49–28
78	March 17	Buffalo	109–116	Bing, Lanier (23)	50–28
79	March 20	Houston	99–103	Dave Bing (18)	51–28
80	March 22	@ Kansas City–Omaha	105–107	George Trapp (18)	51–29
81	March 23	Philadelphia	97–89	Dave Bing (27)	51–30
82	March 26	Atlanta	108–109	Bob Lanier (25)	52–30

== Playoffs ==
1974 playoff game log
Conference semifinals: 3–4 (home: 2–1; road: 1–3)

Game	Date	Team	Score	High points	High rebounds	High assists	Location Attendance	Series
1	March 30	@ Chicago	W 97–88	Bob Lanier (27)	Lanier, Rowe (13)	Don Adams (6)	Chicago Stadium; 10,711	1–0
2	April 1	Chicago	L 103–108	Bob Lanier (38)	Bob Lanier (19)	Dave Bing (7)	Cobo Arena; 11,499	1–1
3	April 5	@ Chicago	L 83–84	Dave Bing (23)	Bob Lanier (16)	Lanier, Rowe (2)	Chicago Stadium; 17,634	1–2
4	April 7	Chicago	W 102–87	Bob Lanier (26)	Bob Lanier (18)	Dave Bing (8)	Cobo Arena; 11,287	2–2
5	April 9	@ Chicago	L 94–98	Bob Lanier (23)	Bob Lanier (17)	Dave Bing (6)	Chicago Stadium; 14,236	2–3
6	April 11	Chicago	W 92–88	Bob Lanier (28)	Bob Lanier (14)	Dave Bing (10)	Cobo Arena; 11,134	3–3
7	April 13	@ Chicago	L 94–96	Stu Lantz (25)	Lanier, Rowe (10)	Stu Lantz (5)	Chicago Stadium; 13,133	3–4

1974 schedule

== Player stats ==
=== Season ===
Player	Games played	Minutes	Points	Rebounds	Assists	Steals	Blocks
Bob Lanier	81	3047	1822	1074	343	110	247
Dave Bing	81	3124	1520	281	555	109	17
Curtis Rowe	82	2499	878	515	136	49	36
George Trapp	82	1489	765	313	81	47	33
Don Adams	74	2298	759	448	141	110	12
John Mengelt	77	1555	680	206	148	68	7
Willie Norwood	74	1178	589	229	58	60	9
Chris Ford	82	2059	585	304	279	148	14

== Awards and records ==
- Ray Scott, NBA Coach of the Year Award
- Dave Bing, All-NBA Second Team

== See also ==
- 1974 in Michigan
