= Howard Porter (basketball) =

American basketball player

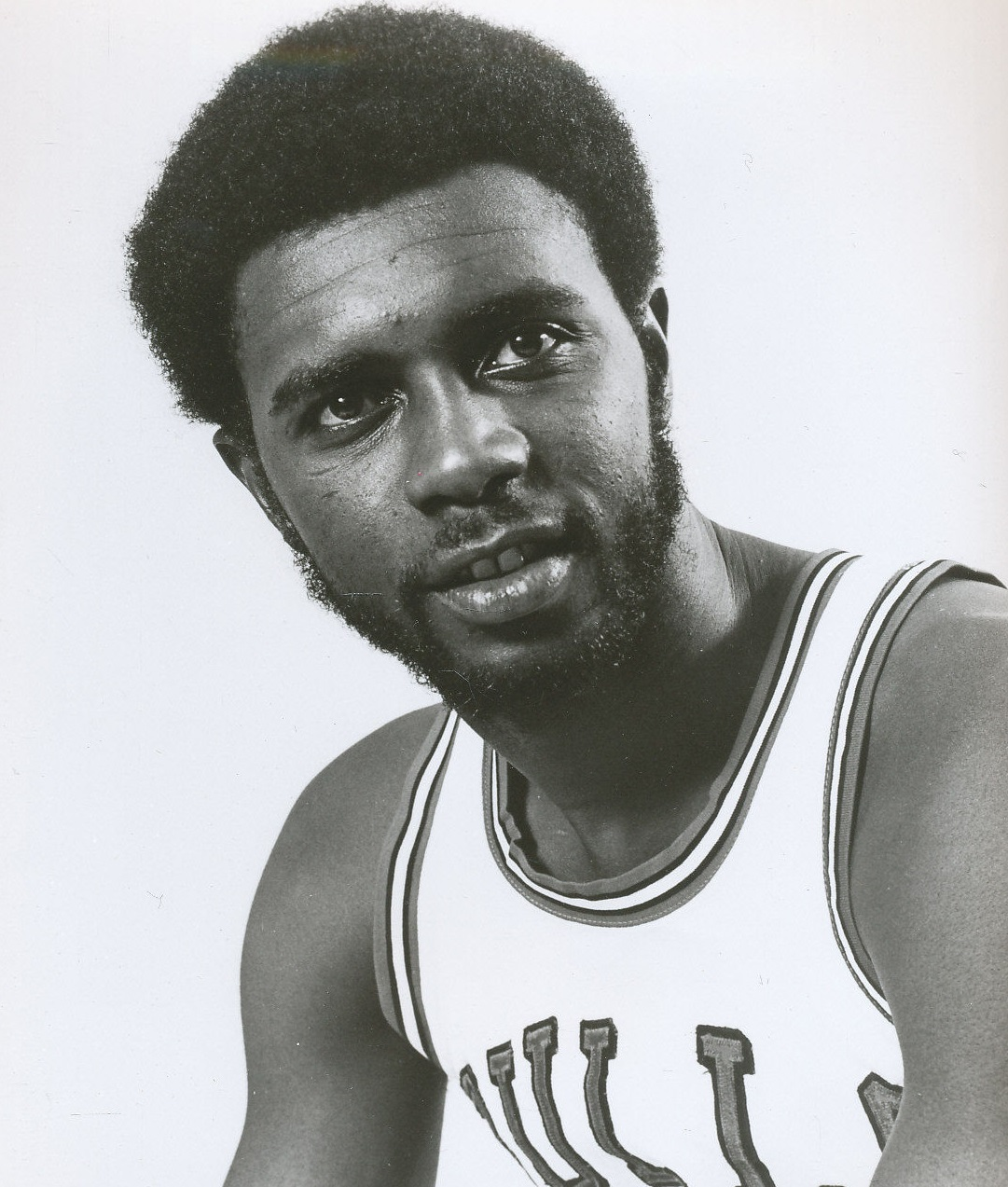
- Porter in 1972

Personal information
- Born: August 31, 1948 Stuart, Florida, U.S.
- Died: May 26, 2007 (aged 58) Minneapolis, Minnesota, U.S.
- Listed height: 6 ft 8 in (2.03 m)
- Listed weight: 220 lb (100 kg)

Career information
- High school: Booker (Sarasota, Florida)
- College: Villanova (1968–1971)
- NBA draft: 1971: 2nd round, 32nd overall pick
- Drafted by: Chicago Bulls
- Playing career: 1971–1978
- Position: Power forward / small forward
- Number: 54

Career history
- 1971–1974: Chicago Bulls
- 1974: New York Knicks
- 1974–1977: Detroit Pistons
- 1977–1978: New Jersey Nets

Career highlights
- No. 54 retired by Villanova Wildcats; Consensus second-team All-American (1971); Third-team All-American – AP, NABC, UPI (1969); NCAA Final Four Most Outstanding Player (1971)*; Robert V. Geasey Trophy winner (1969); First-team Parade All-American (1967); *Selection later vacated

Career NBA statistics
- Points: 4,215 (9.2 ppg)
- Rebounds: 1,872 (4.1 rpg)
- Blocks: 212 (0.6 bpg)
- Stats at NBA.com
- Stats at Basketball Reference

Howard Porter (August 31, 1948 – May 26, 2007) was an American professional basketball player. He played as a power forward and a center.

== Early life ==
Porter was born in Stuart, Florida. While in the 8th grade, he played on the varsity team at Stuart Training School, the high school for Martin County blacks. He attended Booker High School in Sarasota, Florida. The highlight of his high school career occurred in 1967, when he led Booker to the Florida Interscholastic Athletic Association Class A State Basketball Championship.

== College career ==
Porter then played collegiately at Villanova University, where he was a three-time All-America selection. He took Villanova to the 1971 NCAA Championship Game, in which Villanova lost to UCLA 68–62. Porter was named the tournament's Most Outstanding Player after scoring 25 points in the final game. However, he was later ruled ineligible for the honor because he had signed a professional contract with the Pittsburgh Condors of the American Basketball Association during the middle of his senior year. To the present day, the MOP for the 1971 Final Four is listed as "*Vacated".

== Professional career ==
Porter never played for the Condors, instead joining the NBA's Chicago Bulls in 1971. He played seven seasons in the NBA as a member of the Bulls, New York Knicks, Detroit Pistons, and New Jersey Nets.

His best professional season was in 1976–77 with Detroit, when he averaged 13.2 points and 5.9 rebounds, playing alongside fellow Villanova teammate Chris Ford.

Porter was nicknamed "Geezer" during his time at Villanova and had become a fan favorite at the Pistons' then-home, Cobo Arena.

== Post-NBA life ==
Porter had retired from the NBA in 1978 at 29 years old in a career cut short by injuries, including a blood clot in his lungs, and a cocaine addiction, a significant problem in the 1970s NBA. He was arrested in 1985 and served six months in jail for drug possession. He entered a drug rehabilitation program in Minnesota in 1989, remained in the area, and in 1995 began working as a probation officer for Ramsey County.

== 2007 disappearance and murder ==
Howard Porter disappeared on May 18, 2007. He was found severely beaten in a Minneapolis alley in the early morning hours of May 19 and died on May 26 of injuries sustained during the assault.

Local police arrested a 33-year-old prostitute named Tanya Washington, who Porter had solicited, in connection with his murder. Washington was later released by police, who stated that there was not enough evidence to file charges against her. On September 4, police announced that they had arrested and charged Rashad Arthur Raleigh with Porter's murder, who had attacked the former NBA star in a robbery set-up. Raleigh is serving a life sentence for the crime.

Porter is interred at Washington Park Cemetery in Orlo Vista, Florida. He had three children, Ebony, Howard Jr. and Keelee.

== Career statistics ==
Legend
GP	Games played	GS	Games started	MPG	Minutes per game
FG%	Field goal percentage	3P%	3-point field goal percentage	FT%	Free throw percentage
RPG	Rebounds per game	APG	Assists per game	SPG	Steals per game
BPG	Blocks per game	PPG	Points per game	**Bold**	Career high

=== NBA ===
==== Regular season ====
Year	Team	GP	GS	MPG	FG%	FT%	RPG	APG	SPG	BPG	PPG
1971–72	Chicago	67	0	10.9	.424	.766	2.7	.4			6.0
1972–73	Chicago	43	0	9.5	.452	.759	2.7	.4			5.1
1973–74	Chicago	73	**4**	16.8	.450	.800	3.9	.4	.3	.5	9.4
1974–75	New York	17	0	7.8	.361	.778	2.2	.1	.2	.1	1.9
1974–75	Detroit	41		25.1	**.500**	.843	5.3	.4	.5	.6	10.6
1975–76	Detroit	75		19.8	.469	.753	3.9	.3	.4	.5	8.9
1976–77	Detroit	**78**		**28.2**	.483	**.858**	**5.9**	**.7**	**.6**	**.9**	**13.2**
1977–78	Detroit	8		13.4	.372	.571	2.1	.3	.4	.6	4.5
1977–78	New Jersey	55		22.1	.495	.811	4.8	**.7**	.5	.6	12.8
Career		457	4	18.7	.469	.802	4.1	.5	.4	.6	9.2

==== Playoffs ====
Year	Team	GP	MPG	FG%	FT%	RPG	APG	SPG	BPG	PPG
1972	Chicago	4	7.8	.429	**1.000**	2.8	**.8**			4.8
1973	Chicago	6	13.2	.353	.750	3.0	.3			4.5
1974	Chicago	**11**	13.6	.307	**1.000**	4.0	.5	.4	.5	5.5
1975	Detroit	3	30.7	.548	.857	**6.7**	.0	**1.7**	.3	17.3
1976	Detroit	9	23.7	.526	.882	4.7	.7	.8	.6	13.0
1977	Detroit	3	**32.7**	**.617**	.500	5.7	.7	.7	**1.3**	**20.0**
Career		36	18.4	.459	.846	4.2	.5	.7	.6	9.3
