= Ken Durrett =

American basketball player (1948-2001)

Personal information
- Born: December 8, 1948 Pittsburgh, Pennsylvania, U.S.
- Died: January 7, 2001 (aged 52) Pittsburgh, Pennsylvania, U.S.
- Listed height: 6 ft 7 in (2.01 m)
- Listed weight: 190 lb (86 kg)

Career information
- High school: Schenley (Pittsburgh, Pennsylvania)
- College: La Salle (1968–1971)
- NBA draft: 1971: 1st round, 4th overall pick
- Drafted by: Cincinnati Royals
- Playing career: 1971–1977
- Position: Power forward
- Number: 33

Career history
- 1971–1975: Cincinnati Royals / Kansas City-Omaha Kings
- 1975: Philadelphia 76ers
- 1975–1977: Lancaster Red Roses

Career highlights
- All-EBA Second Team (1976); Consensus second-team All-American (1971); 3× Robert V. Geasey Trophy winner (1969–1971); No. 33 retired by La Salle Explorers; Second-team Parade All-American (1967)
- Stats at NBA.com
- Stats at Basketball Reference

Kenneth L. Durrett (December 8, 1948 – January 7, 2001) was an American professional basketball player with the National Basketball Association's Kansas City Kings and Philadelphia 76ers. A 6-foot-7-inch (2.01 m) power forward, Durrett was a star at La Salle University from 1968 to 1971.

== La Salle ==
Durrett was born in Pittsburgh, Pennsylvania and attended Schenley High School and committed to La Salle. Durrett played for the Explorers from 1968 to 1971 and was a three-time recipient of the Robert V. Geasey Trophy, awarded annually to the top player in the Philadelphia Big 5 – one of only four players to accomplish this feat. Durrett finished his collegiate career with 1,679 points (23.6 per game) and led the Big 5 in scoring each of his three years. He was a Co-MVP in the Big 5 as a sophomore in 1969, during the Explorers’ 23–1 season. Durrett led La Salle to a berth in the 1971 National Invitation Tournament and was a Consensus second-team All-American in 1971. He was inducted into the Big 5 Hall of Fame in 1975 and the La Salle Hall of Athletes in 1976. A knee injury ended his college career.

== NBA ==
After completing his collegiate eligibility, Durrett was drafted by the Cincinnati Royals with the fourth pick overall in the 1971 NBA draft. Durrett, still slowed by his college knee injury, played parts of four seasons for the Royals and stayed with the franchise as they became the Kansas City-Omaha Kings. He was dealt to the Philadelphia 76ers midway through the 1974–75 NBA season and retired at the end of that season. His career averages were 4.0 points and 1.9 rebounds per game.

Durrett played for the Lancaster Red Roses of the Eastern Basketball Association (EBA) from 1975 to 1977. He was selected to the All-EBA Second Team in 1976.

After a post-playing career as a community activist and basketball coach in his native Pittsburgh, Durrett died at age 52 of an apparent heart attack.

== Career statistics ==
Legend
GP	Games played	GS	Games started	MPG	Minutes per game
FG%	Field goal percentage	3P%	3-point field goal percentage	FT%	Free throw percentage
RPG	Rebounds per game	APG	Assists per game	SPG	Steals per game
BPG	Blocks per game	PPG	Points per game	**Bold**	Career high

=== NBA ===
==== Regular season ====
Year	Team	GP	GS	MPG	FG%	FT%	RPG	APG	SPG	BPG	PPG
1971–72	Cincinnati	19		**12.3**	.392	**.750**	2.1	**.7**			4.4
1972–73	Kansas City–Omaha	8		8.1	.381	**.750**	1.8	.4			2.8
1973–74	Kansas City–Omaha	**45**		10.3	**.489**	.609	1.7	.4	**.3**	.1	**4.8**
1974–75	Kansas City–Omaha	21		8.3	.410	.550	1.9	.4	.2	**.2**	3.6
1974–75	Philadelphia	27	0	10.0	.398	.625	**2.3**	.4	.1	.1	3.3
Career		120	0	10.0	.434	.637	1.9	.5	.2	.1	4.0
