= Bill Ligon =

American basketball player (1952–2024)

Personal information
- Born: May 19, 1952 Nashville, Tennessee, U.S.
- Died: June 11, 2024 (aged 72) Gallatin, Tennessee, U.S.
- Listed height: 6 ft 4 in (1.93 m)
- Listed weight: 180 lb (82 kg)

Career information
- High school: Gallatin Union (Nashville, Tennessee)
- College: Vanderbilt (1971–1974)
- NBA draft: 1974: 10th round, 175th overall pick
- Drafted by: Detroit Pistons
- Position: Shooting guard
- Number: 26

Career history
- 1974–1975: Detroit Pistons

Career NBA statistics
- Points: 126 (3.3 ppg)
- Rebounds: 26 (0.7 rpg)
- Assists: 25 (0.7 apg)
- Stats at NBA.com
- Stats at Basketball Reference

William Norman Ligon (May 19, 1952 – June 11, 2024) was an American professional basketball shooting guard who played one season in the National Basketball Association (NBA) as a member of the Detroit Pistons during the 1974–75 season. The Pistons drafted him from Vanderbilt University during the tenth round (175th pick overall) of the 1974 NBA draft. He worked as an attorney, specializing in criminal defense and litigation. He died in Gallatin, Tennessee on June 11, 2024, at the age of 72.

== Career statistics ==
Legend
GP	Games played	GS	Games started	MPG	Minutes per game
FG%	Field goal percentage	3P%	3-point field goal percentage	FT%	Free throw percentage
RPG	Rebounds per game	APG	Assists per game	SPG	Steals per game
BPG	Blocks per game	PPG	Points per game	**Bold**	Career high

=== NBA ===
==== Regular season ====
Year	Team	GP	MPG	FG%	FT%	RPG	APG	SPG	BPG	PPG
1974–75	Detroit	38	7.2	.385	.640	.7	.7	.2	.2	3.3

==== Playoffs ====
Year	Team	GP	MPG	FG%	FT%	RPG	APG	SPG	BPG	PPG
1975	Detroit	2	3.5	1.000	–	.0	.0	.0	.0	1.0
