= 1972–73 Detroit Pistons season =

NBA team season

- Head coach: Earl Lloyd (fired); Ray Scott
- General manager: Ed Coil
- Owner: Fred Zollner
- Arena: Cobo Arena

Results
- Record: 40–42 (.488)
- Place: Division: 3rd (Midwest); Conference: 5th (Western)
- Playoff finish: Did not qualify
- Stats at Basketball Reference

The 1972–73 Detroit Pistons season was the Detroit Pistons' 25th season in the NBA and 16th season in the city of Detroit. The team played at Cobo Arena in downtown Detroit.

The Pistons finished with a 40-42 (.488) record, 3rd place in the Midwest Division. The team was led guard Dave Bing (22.4 ppg, 7.8 apg, NBA All-Star), center Bob Lanier (23.8 ppg, 14.9 rpg, NBA All-Star) and forward Curtis Rowe (16.1 ppg). Coach Earl Lloyd was fired after 7 games, replaced by former Pistons player Ray Scott, who led the team to a 38–37 record under his direction. Lanier credited Scott with an improved culture, stating, “He took over and we started playing collectively as a unit. We had a good feeling, and we related well with one another.”

== Draft picks ==
Round	Pick	Player	Position	Nationality	College
1	9	Bob Nash	Forward	United States	Hawaii
2	17	Chris Ford	Guard	United States	Villanova

== Roster ==
Detroit Pistons roster
Players

Pos.	No.	Player	Height	Weight	DOB	From
PG	21	Dave Bing	6 ft 3 in (1.91 m)	180 lb (82 kg)	1943-11-24	Syracuse
C	20	Jim Davis	6 ft 9 in (2.06 m)	225 lb (102 kg)	1941-12-18	Colorado
SG	42	Chris Ford	6 ft 5 in (1.96 m)	190 lb (86 kg)	1949-01-11	Villanova
C	16	Bob Lanier	6 ft 11 in (2.11 m)	250 lb (113 kg)	1948-09-10	St. Bonaventure
SG	22	Stu Lantz	6 ft 3 in (1.91 m)	175 lb (79 kg)	1946-07-13	Nebraska
SG	15	John Mengelt	6 ft 2 in (1.88 m)	195 lb (88 kg)	1949-10-16	Auburn
SF	33	Bob Nash	6 ft 7 in (2.01 m)	195 lb (88 kg)	1950-08-24	Hawaiʻi
SF	8	Willie Norwood	6 ft 7 in (2.01 m)	220 lb (100 kg)	1947-08-08	Alcorn State
PF	18	Curtis Rowe	6 ft 7 in (2.01 m)	225 lb (102 kg)	1949-07-02	UCLA

Coaches
Head coach
- Ray Scott

Legend
- (DP) Unsigned draft pick
- (FA) Free agent
- (S) Suspended
- Injured

Roster
Updated: February 5, 1973

== Regular season ==
=== Season standings ===
Midwest Division	W	L	PCT	GB	Home	Road	Neutral	Div
y-Milwaukee Bucks	60	22	.732	–	33–5	25–15	2–2	15–5
x-Chicago Bulls	51	31	.622	9	29–12	20–19	2–0	10–10
Detroit Pistons	40	42	.488	20	26–15	13–25	1–2	9–11
Kansas City–Omaha Kings	36	46	.439	24	24–17	12–29	–	6–14

#	Western Conference			
#	Team	W	L	PCT
1	z-Milwaukee Bucks	60	22	.732
2	y-Los Angeles Lakers	60	22	.732
3	x-Chicago Bulls	51	31	.622
4	x-Golden State Warriors	47	35	.573
5	Detroit Pistons	40	42	.488
6	Phoenix Suns	38	44	.463
7	Kansas City–Omaha Kings	36	46	.439
8	Seattle SuperSonics	26	56	.317
9	Portland Trail Blazers	21	61	.256

z, y – division champions
x – clinched playoff spot

=== Game log ===
1972–73 Game log
#	Date	Opponent	Score	High points	Record
1	October 11	Boston	121–108	Bing, Lanier (28)	0–1
2	October 13	Chicago	91–100	Bob Lanier (21)	1–1
3	October 14	@ Kansas City–Omaha	101–113	Bob Lanier (31)	1–2
4	October 20	@ Milwaukee	86–109	Curtis Rowe (21)	1–3
5	October 21	Cleveland	96–103	Dave Bing (28)	2–3
6	October 25	Baltimore	115–105	Curtis Rowe (26)	2–4
7	October 27	@ Houston	118–130	Bob Lanier (36)	2–5
8	October 29	@ Portland	119–111	Bob Lanier (33)	3–5
9	October 31	@ Golden State	104–112	Dave Bing (25)	3–6
10	November 1	@ Seattle	116–106	Dave Bing (36)	4–6
11	November 3	@ Los Angeles	107–116	Bob Lanier (37)	4–7
12	November 4	N Houston	118–108	Bob Lanier (42)	4–8
13	November 10	Golden State	96–121	Curtis Rowe (31)	5–8
14	November 11	@ Boston	118–121	Bob Lanier (37)	5–9
15	November 15	Los Angeles	110–99	Bing, Foster, Lanier (20)	5–10
16	November 17	Chicago	96–109	Dave Bing (25)	6–10
17	November 21	Atlanta	110–113 (OT)	Bob Lanier (34)	7–10
18	November 23	@ Phoenix	122–128	Curtis Rowe (26)	7–11
19	November 24	@ Los Angeles	123–140	Dave Bing (29)	7–12
20	November 26	@ Seattle	96–103	Fred Foster (23)	7–13
21	November 28	Portland	116–120	Bob Lanier (48)	8–13
22	November 30	Buffalo	116–127	Adams, Rowe (19)	9–13
23	December 1	@ Cleveland	114–113	Dave Bing (37)	10–13
24	December 5	@ Chicago	108–130	Bob Lanier (19)	10–14
25	December 6	Phoenix	105–114	Bob Lanier (34)	11–14
26	December 8	Kansas City–Omaha	100–113	Bob Lanier (37)	12–14
27	December 9	@ Milwaukee	107–103	Bob Lanier (22)	13–14
28	December 13	Golden State	110–107	Curtis Rowe (26)	13–15
29	December 15	@ Kansas City–Omaha	132–140 (OT)	Bob Lanier (25)	13–16
30	December 16	Houston	123–112	Bob Lanier (36)	13–17
31	December 20	Philadelphia	113–141	Curtis Rowe (35)	14–17
32	December 22	Seattle	97–109	Bob Lanier (23)	15–17
33	December 23	@ Baltimore	97–104	Dave Bing (27)	15–18
34	December 25	@ New York	110–113	Dave Bing (35)	15–19
35	December 26	Milwaukee	105–112	Stu Lantz (37)	16–19
36	December 28	@ Milwaukee	91–115	Dave Bing (28)	16–20
37	December 29	New York	99–94	Bob Lanier (38)	16–21
38	January 3	Phoenix	105–119	Bob Lanier (38)	17–21
39	January 5	@ Kansas City–Omaha	100–103	Willie Norwood (19)	17–22
40	January 6	Atlanta	116–111	Dave Bing (26)	17–23
41	January 7	@ Portland	101–96	Bob Lanier (32)	18–23
42	January 9	@ Golden State	98–105	Curtis Rowe (27)	18–24
43	January 10	@ Phoenix	121–123	Dave Bing (29)	18–25
44	January 12	@ Seattle	104–113	Bob Lanier (25)	18–26
45	January 15	Portland	101–112	Dave Bing (31)	19–26
46	January 16	@ Atlanta	129–130 (OT)	Dave Bing (32)	19–27
47	January 17	Seattle	106–104	Dave Bing (26)	19–28
48	January 19	@ Buffalo	98–108	Curtis Rowe (22)	19–29
49	January 20	Chicago	92–112	Bing, Norwood (21)	20–29
50	January 26	Milwaukee	117–105	Curtis Rowe (30)	20–30
51	January 28	@ Chicago	105–110	Dave Bing (32)	20–31
52	January 30	@ Atlanta	126–123	Bob Lanier (40)	21–31
53	January 31	New York	91–94	Bob Lanier (30)	22–31
54	February 2	Philadelphia	104–114	Bob Lanier (26)	23–31
55	February 6	@ Buffalo	107–105	Dave Bing (25)	24–31
56	February 7	Phoenix	107–113	Bob Lanier (26)	25–31
57	February 9	@ Boston	104–95	Bob Lanier (27)	26–31
58	February 10	@ New York	93–107	Bob Lanier (25)	26–32
59	February 13	Milwaukee	110–96	Bob Lanier (29)	26–33
60	February 16	@ Philadelphia	106–119	Dave Bing (42)	26–34
61	February 17	Cleveland	106–104	Bob Lanier (38)	26–35
62	February 18	Kansas City–Omaha	100–144	Bob Lanier (25)	27–35
63	February 21	Los Angeles	98–106	Bob Lanier (25)	28–35
64	February 23	Baltimore	105–107	Bob Lanier (30)	29–35
65	February 25	Houston	112–129	Bob Lanier (42)	30–35
66	February 27	Golden State	100–114	Curtis Rowe (25)	31–35
67	March 2	Boston	115–101	Bob Lanier (40)	31–36
68	March 3	Seattle	115–113	Dave Bing (26)	31–37
69	March 4	@ Portland	113–109	Bob Lanier (31)	32–37
70	March 6	@ Golden State	93–108	John Mengelt (23)	32–38
71	March 10	@ Phoenix	117–110	Bob Lanier (27)	33–38
72	March 11	@ Los Angeles	117–141	Don Adams (20)	33–39
73	March 14	Los Angeles	121–112	Dave Bing (23)	33–40
74	March 16	Buffalo	100–121	Don Adams (36)	34–40
75	March 17	@ Chicago	99–97	John Mengelt (29)	35–40
76	March 18	Chicago	119–107	Dave Bing (24)	35–41
77	March 19	N Milwaukee	118–99	Bob Lanier (24)	35–42
78	March 21	Portland	109–122	Bob Lanier (33)	36–42
79	March 24	Kansas City–Omaha	98–110	Ford, Rowe (20)	37–42
80	March 25	N Philadelphia	96–115	Bob Lanier (27)	38–42
81	March 27	@ Baltimore	112–98	Dave Bing (30)	39–42
82	March 28	@ Cleveland	131–119 (OT)	Dave Bing (34)	40–42
