= 1974–75 Detroit Pistons season =

NBA team season

- Head coach: Ray Scott
- General manager: Ed Coil
- Owner: Bill Davidson
- Arena: Cobo Arena

Results
- Record: 40–42 (.488)
- Place: Division: 3rd (Midwest); Conference: 5th (Western)
- Playoff finish: First round (lost to SuperSonics 1–2)
- Stats at Basketball Reference

The 1974–75 Detroit Pistons season was the Detroit Pistons' 27th season in the NBA and 18th season in the city of Detroit. The team played at Cobo Arena in downtown Detroit.

The Pistons finished with a 40–42 (.488) record, 3rd place in the Midwest Division. The team was led guard Dave Bing (19.0 ppg, 7.7 apg, NBA All-Star), who held out over a contract dispute in the pre-season and center Bob Lanier (24.0 ppg, 12.0 rpg, NBA All-Star). The steady improvement of the previous three seasons (26 to 40 to 52 wins) came to a halt, as injuries played a significant role in derailing the promising season. In Sports Illustrated, the team was discussing Lanier playing through injury, "He’s our savior," says Rowe. Our healer, says Adams. Our leader, says Bing. Listen to those guys, says Lanier. They think I'm Moses."

Detroit advanced to the 1975 NBA Playoffs, losing a first round series of the Western Conference playoffs 2–1 to the Seattle SuperSonics, dropping the deciding 3rd game 100–94 in Seattle, with each team winning at home in the series. Lanier was limited in the series, averaging 20.3 ppg vs. his season average of 24.0 ppg, Howard Porter, picked up in a December trade with the Chicago Bulls, had an excellent series with 17.3 ppg, but the team could not overcome the stellar shooting of Downtown Freddie Brown, who averaged 23.7 ppg and Tom Burleson with a double-double of 22.3 ppg and 10.7 rpg.

== Draft picks ==
Round	Pick	Player	Position	Nationality	College
1	15	Al Eberhard	Forward	United States	Missouri
2	33	Eric Money	Guard	United States	Arizona
10	175	Bill Ligon	Guard	United States	Vanderbilt

== Roster ==
1974–75 Detroit Pistons roster
Players

Pos.	No.	Player	Height	Weight	DOB	From
SF	10	Don Adams	6 ft 6 in (1.98 m)	210 lb (95 kg)	1947-11-27	Northwestern
PG	21	Dave Bing	6 ft 3 in (1.91 m)	180 lb (82 kg)	1943-11-24	Syracuse
C	20	Jim Davis	6 ft 9 in (2.06 m)	225 lb (102 kg)	1941-12-18	Colorado
SF	44	Al Eberhard	6 ft 6 in (1.98 m)	240 lb (109 kg)	1952-05-10	Missouri
SG	42	Chris Ford	6 ft 5 in (1.96 m)	190 lb (86 kg)	1949-01-11	Villanova
C	16	Bob Lanier	6 ft 11 in (2.11 m)	250 lb (113 kg)	1948-09-10	St. Bonaventure
SG	26	Bill Ligon	6 ft 6 in (1.98 m)	180 lb (82 kg)	1952-05-29	Vanderbilt
SG	15	John Mengelt	6 ft 2 in (1.88 m)	195 lb (88 kg)	1949-10-16	Auburn
SG	14	Eric Money	6 ft 0 in (1.83 m)	170 lb (77 kg)	1955-02-06	Arizona
C	43	Otto Moore	6 ft 11 in (2.11 m)	205 lb (93 kg)	1946-08-27	Texas–Pan American
SF	8	Willie Norwood	6 ft 7 in (2.01 m)	220 lb (100 kg)	1947-08-08	Alcorn State
SF	54	Howard Porter	6 ft 8 in (2.03 m)	220 lb (100 kg)	1948-08-31	Villanova
PF	18	Curtis Rowe	6 ft 7 in (2.01 m)	225 lb (102 kg)	1949-07-02	UCLA
PF	31	George Trapp	6 ft 8 in (2.03 m)	205 lb (93 kg)	1948-07-11	Long Beach State

Coaches
Head coach
- Ray Scott
Assistant(s)
- Jim Davis

Legend
- (DP) Unsigned draft pick
- (FA) Free agent
- (S) Suspended
- Injured

Roster
Updated: February 18, 1975

== Regular season ==
=== Season standings ===
Midwest Division	W	L	PCT	GB	Home	Road	Div
y-Chicago Bulls	47	35	.573	–	29–12	18–23	11–15
x-Kansas City–Omaha Kings	44	38	.537	3	29–12	15–26	17–9
x-Detroit Pistons	40	42	.488	7	26–15	14–27	10–16
Milwaukee Bucks	38	44	.463	9	25–16	13–28	14–12

#	Western Conference				
#	Team	W	L	PCT	GB
1	z-Golden State Warriors	48	34	.585	–
2	y-Chicago Bulls	47	35	.573	1
3	x-Kansas City–Omaha Kings	44	38	.537	4
4	x-Seattle SuperSonics	43	39	.524	5
5	x-Detroit Pistons	40	42	.488	8
6	Portland Trail Blazers	38	44	.463	10
6	Milwaukee Bucks	38	44	.463	10
8	Phoenix Suns	32	50	.390	16
9	Los Angeles Lakers	30	52	.366	18

z – clinched division title
y – clinched division title
x – clinched playoff spot

=== Season schedule ===
1974–75 game log
Total: 40–42 (home: 26–15; road: 14–27)
October: 3–4 (home: 0–1; road: 3–3)

Game	Date	Team	Score	High points	High rebounds	High assists	Location Attendance	Record
1	October 18	@ Seattle	100–95	Bob Lanier (30)	Bob Lanier (14)	Dave Bing (7)	Seattle Center Coliseum; 9,537	1–0
2	October 19	@ Portland	122–99	Dave Bing (24)	Bob Lanier (9)	Dave Bing (10)	Memorial Coliseum; 11,831	2–0
3	October 23	@ Phoenix	90–100	Bob Lanier (24)	Bob Lanier (14)	Dave Bing (8)	Arizona Veterans Memorial Coliseum; 5,924	2–1
4	October 25	@ Los Angeles	110–107	Dave Bing (25)	Curtis Rowe (16)	Dave Bing (6)	The Forum; 12,044	3–1
5	October 26	@ Golden State	104–105	Dave Bing (26)	Bob Lanier (12)	Dave Bing (6)	Oakland-Alameda County Coliseum Arena; 5,436	3–2
6	October 30	Atlanta	104–96	Dave Bing (25)	Bob Lanier (16)	John Mengelt (11)	Cobo Arena; 6,716	3–3
7	October 31	@ Cleveland	101–118	Bob Lanier (41)	Bob Lanier (14)	Dave Bing (10)	Richfield Coliseum; 5,584	3–4

November: 8–6 (home: 4–3; road: 4–3)

Game	Date	Team	Score	High points	High rebounds	High assists	Location Attendance	Record
8	November 1	New Orleans	93–103	Eric Money (21)	Bob Lanier (21)	Bob Lanier (8)	Cobo Arena; 4,237	4–4
9	November 2	@ Philadelphia	100–94	Bob Lanier (26)	Curtis Rowe (14)	Dave Bing (11)	The Spectrum; 6,890	5–4
10	November 6	Kansas City–Omaha	104–118	Dave Bing (30)	Bob Lanier (17)	Chris Ford (9)	Cobo Arena; 7,202	6–4
11	November 8	@ Boston	105–104	Dave Bing (32)	Bob Lanier (20)	Dave Bing (7)	Boston Garden; 9,542	7–4
12	November 9	@ Buffalo	100–109	Bob Lanier (20)	Bob Lanier (16)	Bing, Money, Rowe, Trapp (3)	Buffalo Memorial Auditorium; 12,113	7–5
13	November 10	Buffalo	124–117	Bob Lanier (45)	Bob Lanier (15)	Dave Bing (15)	Cobo Arena; 4,301	7–6
14	November 13	Milwaukee	91–98	Bob Lanier (40)	Bob Lanier (24)	Dave Bing (8)	Cobo Arena; 4,994	8–6
15	November 15	Seattle	103–117	John Mengelt (20)	Bob Lanier (10)	Bing, Lanier (6)	Cobo Arena; 6,789	9–6
16	November 16	@ Houston	98–118	Dave Bing (16)	Bob Lanier (10)	—	Hofheinz Pavilion; 2,457	9–7
17	November 17	@ New Orleans	99–85	Bob Lanier (26)	Bob Lanier (17)	Dave Bing (4)	Municipal Auditorium; 3,441	10–7
18	November 19	@ Kansas City–Omaha	87–97	Bob Lanier (25)	Don Adams (16)	Dave Bing (6)	Kemper Arena; 4,847	10–8
19	November 20	Phoenix	114–106	Dave Bing (27)	Bob Lanier (16)	Bob Lanier (9)	Cobo Arena; 3,807	10–9
20	November 23	Golden State	110–98	Bob Lanier (25)	Bob Lanier (18)	Dave Bing (9)	Cobo Arena; 6,902	10–10
21	November 26	@ New York	99–88	Bob Lanier (36)	Bob Lanier (10)	Bob Lanier (6)	Madison Square Garden; 18,254	11–10

December: 8–7 (home: 6–2; road: 2–5)

Game	Date	Team	Score	High points	High rebounds	High assists	Location Attendance	Record
22	December 4	Houston	69–86	Bob Lanier (24)	Bob Lanier (10)	Bob Lanier (4)	Cobo Arena; 3,445	12–10
23	December 6	Cleveland	91–117	Dave Bing (24)	Bob Lanier (14)	Dave Bing (8)	Cobo Arena; 4,763	13–10
24	December 7	@ Washington	89–94	Dave Bing (30)	Don Adams (10)	Dave Bing (6)	Capital Centre; 9,094	13–11
25	December 8	Kansas City–Omaha	96–92	Bob Lanier (32)	Bob Lanier (10)	Dave Bing (13)	Cobo Arena; 5,134	13–12
26	December 10	@ Milwaukee	82–90	Dave Bing (21)	Bob Lanier (13)	Bing, Ford, Lanier (4)	MECCA Arena; 9,625	13–13
27	December 11	Washington	89–103	Bob Lanier (37)	Bob Lanier (20)	Dave Bing (11)	Cobo Arena; 5,376	14–13
28	December 13	@ Kansas City–Omaha	84–88	Curtis Rowe (20)	Bob Lanier (17)	Dave Bing (3)	Omaha Civic Auditorium; 4,702	14–14
29	December 14	Philadelphia	93–100	John Mengelt (33)	Jim Davis (9)	Bob Lanier (8)	Cobo Arena; 4,812	15–14
30	December 18	Seattle	100–97	Lanier, Rowe (21)	Bob Lanier (17)	Bob Lanier (7)	Cobo Arena; 4,365	15–15
31	December 20	@ Los Angeles	103–102	Bob Lanier (34)	Bob Lanier (14)	Dave Bing (11)	The Forum; 9,667	16–15
32	December 21	@ Portland	97–108	Dave Bing (19)	Jim Davis (15)	Dave Bing (6)	Memorial Coliseum; 11,005	16–16
33	December 22	@ Seattle	90–108	Curtis Rowe (22)	Jim Davis (9)	Dave Bing (8)	Seattle Center Coliseum; 13,346	16–17
34	December 26	New York	83–84	Bob Lanier (27)	Bob Lanier (14)	Dave Bing (11)	Cobo Arena; 11,265	17–17
35	December 28	Chicago	70–79	Dave Bing (21)	Bob Lanier (10)	Bob Lanier (6)	Cobo Arena; 11,015	18–17
36	December 30	@ Chicago	86–81	Bob Lanier (26)	Bob Lanier (19)	Dave Bing (6)	Chicago Stadium; 10,846	19–17

January: 11–4 (home: 8–1; road: 3–3)

Game	Date	Team	Score	High points	High rebounds	High assists	Location Attendance	Record
37	January 2	New Orleans	95–99	Bob Lanier (36)	Bob Lanier (11)	Dave Bing (15)	Cobo Arena; 5,176	20–17
38	January 3	@ Buffalo	111–92	Bob Lanier (23)	Davis, Lanier (7)	Dave Bing (11)	Buffalo Memorial Auditorium; 13,464	21–17
39	January 4	Philadelphia	82–89	Dave Bing (28)	Bob Lanier (17)	Bob Lanier (7)	Cobo Arena; 6,168	22–17
40	January 8	Milwaukee	102–92	Dave Bing (28)	Bob Lanier (13)	Dave Bing (6)	Cobo Arena; 11,388	22–18
41	January 10	@ Milwaukee	89–81	Bob Lanier (29)	Lanier, Rowe (9)	Chris Ford (7)	MECCA Arena; 10,938	23–18
42	January 11	@ Atlanta	118–113	Bob Lanier (43)	Bob Lanier (14)	—	Omni Coliseum; 8,288	24–18
43	January 17	@ Boston	90–96	Bob Lanier (30)	Bob Lanier (14)	Dave Bing (10)	Boston Garden; 15,320	24–19
44	January 18	Phoenix	77–86	Dave Bing (21)	Lanier, Trapp (10)	Dave Bing (14)	Cobo Arena; 6,053	25–19
45	January 19	Cleveland	98–100	John Mengelt (23)	Bob Lanier (13)	Dave Bing (7)	Cobo Arena; 5,390	26–19
46	January 22	Portland	94–96	Lanier, Rowe (25)	Curtis Rowe (13)	Dave Bing (7)	Cobo Arena; 9,180	27–19
47	January 24	Atlanta	103–113	George Trapp (24)	Bob Lanier (9)	Dave Bing (10)	Cobo Arena; 5,638	28–19
48	January 25	@ Chicago	96–116	Dave Bing (21)	Jim Davis (10)	Chris Ford (3)	Chicago Stadium; 18,720	28–20
49	January 26	Chicago	93–102 (OT)	Bob Lanier (31)	Curtis Rowe (15)	Dave Bing (11)	Cobo Arena; 10,210	29–20
50	January 29	Golden State	90–93	Bob Lanier (30)	Bob Lanier (15)	Dave Bing (12)	Cobo Arena; 9,538	30–20
51	January 30	@ Houston	88–103	Bob Lanier (22)	Jim Davis (8)	Dave Bing (7)	Hofheinz Pavilion; 2,317	30–21

February: 3–12 (home: 3–5; road: 0–7)

Game	Date	Team	Score	High points	High rebounds	High assists	Location Attendance	Record
52	February 1	Buffalo	113–119	Bob Lanier (39)	Bob Lanier (20)	Dave Bing (11)	Cobo Arena; 11,245	31–21
53	February 2	@ Cleveland	96–116	Bob Lanier (29)	Bob Lanier (8)	Adams, Bing (4)	Richfield Coliseum; 5,144	31–22
54	February 3	Boston	114–100	Bob Lanier (27)	Bob Lanier (11)	Dave Bing (9)	Cobo Arena; 10,962	31–23
55	February 6	@ Atlanta	98–111	Bob Lanier (32)	Bob Lanier (9)	Dave Bing (8)	Omni Coliseum; 2,992	31–24
56	February 7	@ Chicago	83–95	Bob Lanier (17)	Bob Lanier (15)	Ford, Lanier (4)	Chicago Stadium; 18,836	31–25
57	February 9	Los Angeles	96–97	Bob Lanier (31)	Curtis Rowe (11)	Dave Bing (9)	Cobo Arena; 7,227	32–25
58	February 10	@ Milwaukee	109–130	Howard Porter (22)	Curtis Rowe (12)	Eric Money (8)	MECCA Arena; 10,309	32–26
59	February 12	Chicago	103–93	Howard Porter (20)	Bob Lanier (8)	Bob Lanier (6)	Cobo Arena; 10,706	32–27
60	February 14	@ Philadelphia	101–103	Bob Lanier (27)	Bob Lanier (11)	Dave Bing (15)	The Spectrum; 5,595	32–28
61	February 15	Kansas City–Omaha	93–81	Howard Porter (19)	Bob Lanier (15)	Dave Bing (12)	Cobo Arena; 7,174	32–29
62	February 16	@ Kansas City–Omaha	99–102	Bob Lanier (27)	Lanier, Rowe (12)	Ford, Lanier (6)	Kemper Arena; 13,981	32–30
63	February 19	New York	109–94	Bob Lanier (20)	Howard Porter (7)	Bob Lanier (8)	Cobo Arena; 8,056	32–31
64	February 21	Washington	121–96	Bob Lanier (22)	Bob Lanier (14)	Bing, Lanier (5)	Cobo Arena; 9,571	32–32
65	February 26	Milwaukee	84–104	Bob Lanier (26)	Howard Porter (10)	Dave Bing (9)	Cobo Arena; 10,190	33–32
66	February 28	@ Washington	95–106	Bob Lanier (20)	Bob Lanier (14)	Dave Bing (9)	Capital Centre; 11,121	33–33

March: 6–7 (home: 4–2; road: 2–5)

Game	Date	Team	Score	High points	High rebounds	High assists	Location Attendance	Record
67	March 1	Chicago	94–95	Dave Bing (27)	Howard Porter (13)	Bob Lanier (9)	Cobo Arena; 10,666	34–33
68	March 2	@ Kansas City–Omaha	112–122	Bing, Lanier (25)	Curtis Rowe (9)	Dave Bing (8)	Kemper Arena; 14,843	34–34
69	March 4	@ Milwaukee	83–101	Howard Porter (18)	Lanier, Porter (7)	Dave Bing (8)	MECCA Arena; 10,575	34–35
70	March 8	@ New York	100–118	Dave Bing (26)	Jim Davis (7)	Dave Bing (6)	Madison Square Garden; 19,694	34–36
71	March 9	Kansas City–Omaha	99–106	John Mengelt (30)	Curtis Rowe (16)	Dave Bing (13)	Cobo Arena; 7,979	35–36
72	March 11	Los Angeles	95–94	Bob Lanier (29)	Bob Lanier (12)	Dave Bing (9)	Cobo Arena; 6,263	35–37
73	March 14	@ Chicago	94–97	Bing, Mengelt (21)	Bob Lanier (11)	Dave Bing (11)	Chicago Stadium; 14,377	35–38
74	March 18	Boston	116–90	George Trapp (23)	Howard Porter (10)	John Mengelt (6)	Cobo Arena; 9,379	35–39
75	March 21	Houston	110–121	John Mengelt (28)	Bob Lanier (11)	Dave Bing (13)	Cobo Arena; 9,048	36–39
76	March 23	@ New Orleans	125–114	Dave Bing (29)	Lanier, Rowe (13)	Dave Bing (6)	Municipal Auditorium; 4,182	37–39
77	March 26	Portland	107–110	Dave Bing (28)	Bob Lanier (11)	Dave Bing (7)	Cobo Arena; 6,457	38–39
78	March 27	@ Phoenix	91–79	Bob Lanier (26)	Bob Lanier (11)	Bob Lanier (9)	Arizona Veterans Memorial Coliseum; 5,629	39–39
79	March 29	@ Golden State	112–115	John Mengelt (27)	Bob Lanier (12)	Dave Bing (8)	Oakland-Alameda County Coliseum Arena; 12,787	39–40

April: 1–2 (home: 1–1; road: 0–1)

Game	Date	Team	Score	High points	High rebounds	High assists	Location Attendance	Record
80	April 1	@ Milwaukee	91–98	Bob Lanier (19)	George Trapp (11)	Dave Bing (13)	MECCA Arena; 10,021	39–41
81	April 2	Chicago	89–97	Bob Lanier (26)	Howard Porter (12)	Chris Ford (6)	Cobo Arena; 9,336	40–41
82	April 5	Milwaukee	119–106	Howard Porter (20)	Jim Davis (18)	Davis, Ford (6)	Cobo Arena; 9,107	40–42

Source: www.basketball-reference.com

== Playoffs ==
1975 playoff game log
First Round: 1–2 (home: 1–0; road: 0–2)

Game	Date	Team	Score	High points	High rebounds	High assists	Location Attendance	Series
1	April 8	@ Seattle	L 77–90	Howard Porter (21)	Bob Lanier (14)	Bob Lanier (9)	Seattle Center Coliseum; 14,082	0–1
2	April 10	Seattle	W 122–106	Bing, Trapp (24)	George Trapp (14)	Dave Bing (11)	Cobo Arena; 10,490	1–1
3	April 12	@ Seattle	L 93–100	Bob Lanier (29)	Curtis Rowe (13)	Dave Bing (10)	Seattle Center Coliseum; 14,082	1–2

1975 schedule
