= Jim Davis (basketball player) =

American basketball player (1941–2018)

Personal information
- Born: December 18, 1941 Muncie, Indiana, U.S.
- Died: December 27, 2018 (aged 77) Windsor, Ontario, U.S.
- Listed height: 6 ft 9 in (2.06 m)
- Listed weight: 225 lb (102 kg)

Career information
- High school: Muncie Central (Muncie, Indiana)
- College: Colorado (1961–1964)
- NBA draft: 1964: 4th round, 27th overall pick
- Drafted by: Detroit Pistons
- Playing career: 1964–1975
- Position: Power forward / center
- Number: 24, 25, 30, 20

Career history
- 1964–1967: Sunbury Mercuries
- 1967–1971: St. Louis / Atlanta Hawks
- 1971: Houston Rockets
- 1971–1975: Detroit Pistons

Career NBA statistics
- Points: 3,997 (6.7 ppg)
- Rebounds: 3,109 (5.2 rpg)
- Assists: 739 (1.2 apg)
- Stats at NBA.com
- Stats at Basketball Reference

James William Davis (December 18, 1941 – December 27, 2018) was an American professional basketball player who played eight seasons in the National Basketball Association (NBA).

A 6'9" center from the University of Colorado, Davis played in the National Basketball Association from 1967 to 1975 as a member of the St. Louis/Atlanta Hawks, Houston Rockets, and Detroit Pistons. He averaged 6.7 points and 5.2 rebounds in his NBA career.

Davis died of complications from cancer on December 27, 2018, at age 77.

== Career statistics ==
Legend
GP	Games played	GS	Games started	MPG	Minutes per game
FG%	Field goal percentage	3P%	3-point field goal percentage	FT%	Free throw percentage
RPG	Rebounds per game	APG	Assists per game	SPG	Steals per game
BPG	Blocks per game	PPG	Points per game	**Bold**	Career high
*	Led the league

=== NBA ===
==== Regular season ====
Year	Team	GP	MPG	FG%	FT%	RPG	APG	SPG	BPG	PPG
1967–68	St. Louis	50	7.9	.439	.391	2.5	.3			2.9
1968–69	Atlanta	78	17.5	.467	.667	6.8	1.2			8.8
1969–70	Atlanta	**82***	**32.0**	.464	**.755**	**9.7**	**2.9**			**13.6**
1970–71	Atlanta	**82**	22.7	.479	.677	6.7	1.3			8.3
1971–72	Atlanta	11	10.8	.242	.556	3.3	.7			2.4
1971–72	Houston	12	15.0	.333	.684	3.7	.4			5.2
1971–72	Detroit	52	13.2	.482	.653	3.8	.7			5.9
1972–73	Detroit	73	10.6	**.510**	.632	3.6	.8			4.6
1973–74	Detroit	78	12.1	.413	.647	3.8	1.1	.5	.4	4.2
1974–75	Detroit	79	13.6	.454	.726	3.6	1.1	**.6**	**.5**	4.1
Career		597	16.8	.461	.674	5.2	1.2	.6	.4	6.7

==== Playoffs ====
Year	Team	GP	MPG	FG%	FT%	RPG	APG	SPG	BPG	PPG
1968	St. Louis	2	4.5	.333	–	1.5	.0			1.0
1969	Atlanta	8	6.5	.267	.625	2.1	.1			1.6
1970	Atlanta	**9**	13.0	.378	.588	3.3	.7			4.2
1971	Atlanta	5	**23.8**	.472	**.815**	**4.4**	**.8**			**11.2**
1974	Detroit	7	9.9	**.579**	.667	2.3	.7	.3	**.1**	3.7
1975	Detroit	2	8.0	.500	.600	2.0	.0	**.5**	.0	3.5
Career		33	11.6	.430	.698	2.8	.5	.3	.1	4.3
