= Don Adams (basketball) =

American basketball player (1947–2013)

Personal information
- Born: November 27, 1947 Atlanta, Georgia, U.S.
- Died: December 25, 2013 (aged 66) Royal Oak, Michigan, U.S.
- Listed height: 6 ft 6 in (1.98 m)
- Listed weight: 210 lb (95 kg)

Career information
- High school: South Fulton (South Fulton, Georgia)
- College: Northwestern (1967–1970)
- NBA draft: 1970: 8th round, 120th overall pick
- Drafted by: San Diego Rockets
- Playing career: 1970–1977
- Position: Small forward
- Number: 32, 10

Career history
- 1970–1971: San Diego / Houston Rockets
- 1971–1972: Atlanta Hawks
- 1972–1975: Detroit Pistons
- 1975: Spirits of St. Louis
- 1975–1977: Buffalo Braves

Career NBA and ABA statistics
- Points: 4,598 (8.8 ppg)
- Rebounds: 2,916 (5.6 rpg)
- Assists: 1,011 (1.9 apg)
- Stats at NBA.com
- Stats at Basketball Reference

Donald Lamar Adams (November 27, 1947 – December 25, 2013) was an American professional basketball player. He was 6 feet 6 inches (1.98 m) tall and weighed 210 pounds (95 kg).

Born in Atlanta, Adams attended South Fulton High School in Fulton, Georgia. He played college basketball for the Northwestern Wildcats and was selected in the 8th round of the 1970 NBA draft by the San Diego Rockets. In his National Basketball Association (NBA) career, Adams averaged 8.7 points per game, 5.6 rebounds per game and 1.8 assists per game. In the ABA, Adams played with the Spirits of St. Louis and played for the league minimum late in the 1974-75 season. Notably, in a scuffle between Marvin Barnes and Swen Nater, he cane from the blind side to deck Nater with one punch. Adams averaged 10.1 points per game, 5.1 rebounds per game and 3.9 assists per game before moving back to the NBA with the Buffalo Braves late in the 1975-76 season.

Adams worked as a financial advisor and lived in Southfield, Michigan, after his retirement from playing. He was married and had two children. Adams died at Beaumont Hospital, Royal Oak on December 25, 2013.

== NBA/ABA career statistics ==
Legend
GP	Games played	GS	Games started	MPG	Minutes per game
FG%	Field goal percentage	3P%	3-point field goal percentage	FT%	Free throw percentage
RPG	Rebounds per game	APG	Assists per game	SPG	Steals per game
BPG	Blocks per game	PPG	Points per game	**Bold**	Career high

=== Regular season ===
Year	Team	GP	GS	MPG	FG%	3P%	FT%	RPG	APG	SPG	BPG	PPG
1970–71	San Diego	**82**	–	29.0	.409	–	.731	**7.1**	2.1	–	–	11.4
1971–72	Houston	3	–	13.7	.316	–	.500	2.7	1.0	–	–	4.3
1971–72	Atlanta	70	–	29.0	.394	–	.747	**7.1**	2.0	–	–	11.7
1972–73	Atlanta	4	–	19.0	.211	–	**.875**	5.5	1.3	–	–	5.8
1972–73	Detroit	70	–	25.7	.402	–	.784	6.0	1.6	–	–	9.3
1973–74	Detroit	74	–	31.1	.408	–	.761	6.1	1.9	1.5	.2	10.3
1974–75	Detroit	51	–	31.1	.403	–	.577	4.8	1.5	1.4	**.4**	5.9
1974–75	St. Louis	16	–	21.4	**.429**	.000	.773	4.3	3.4	.8	.1	6.3
1975–76	St. Louis	20	–	**36.3**	.394	.000	.759	5.8	**4.4**	**1.9**	**.4**	**13.1**
1975–76	Buffalo	56	–	12.6	.394	–	.702	2.6	1.3	.5	.1	3.1
1976–77	Buffalo	77	–	22.2	.411	–	.746	4.8	1.9	1.0	.2	7.3
Career		523	–	25.8	.402	.000	.741	5.6	1.9	1.1	.2	8.8

=== Playoffs ===
Year	Team	GP	GS	MPG	FG%	3P%	FT%	RPG	APG	SPG	BPG	PPG
1971–72	Atlanta	6	–	31.3	.357	–	.696	6.3	2.0	–	–	**9.3**
1973–74	Detroit	7	–	**36.6**	.384	–	.571	**7.3**	2.9	.9	.1	9.1
1974–75	St. Louis	**10**	–	30.1	**.427**	.000	.714	4.7	**4.6**	**1.7**	**1.1**	9.0
1975–76	Buffalo	9	–	13.6	.417	–	**.857**	3.0	1.4	.2	.0	4.0
Career		32	–	27.1	.397	.000	.694	5.1	2.8	1.0	.5	7.7
