= Curtis Rowe =

American retired basketball player (born 1949)

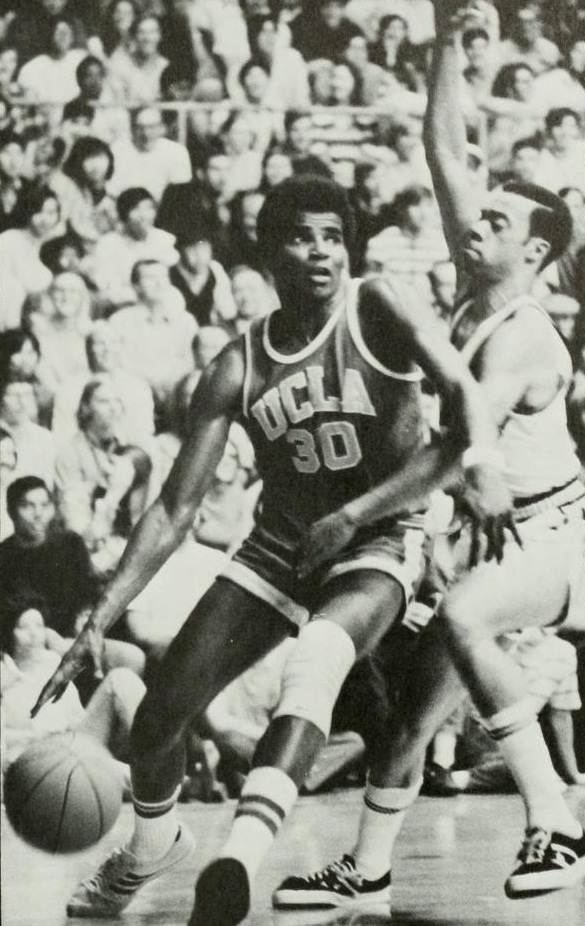
- Rowe in his senior year at UCLA

Personal information
- Born: July 2, 1949 (age 77) Bessemer, Alabama, U.S.
- Listed height: 6 ft 7 in (2.01 m)
- Listed weight: 225 lb (102 kg)

Career information
- High school: John C. Fremont (Los Angeles, California)
- College: UCLA (1968–1971)
- NBA draft: 1971: 1st round, 11th overall pick
- Drafted by: Detroit Pistons
- Playing career: 1971–1979
- Position: Power forward
- Number: 18, 41

Career history
- 1971–1976: Detroit Pistons
- 1976–1979: Boston Celtics

Career highlights
- NBA All-Star (1976); 3× NCAA champion (1969–1971); Consensus second-team All-American (1971); 2× First-team All-Pac-8 (1969, 1971); Second-team All-Pac-8 (1970); First-team Parade All-American (1967); California Mr. Basketball (1967)

Career NBA statistics
- Points: 6,873 (11.6 ppg)
- Rebounds: 4,264 (7.2 rpg)
- Assists: 932 (1.6 apg)
- Stats at NBA.com
- Stats at Basketball Reference

Curtis Rowe Jr. (born July 2, 1949) is an American former professional basketball player.

A 6'7" forward from UCLA, Rowe was drafted by the Dallas Chaparrals in the 1971 ABA Draft and by the Detroit Pistons in the first round of the 1971 NBA draft. Rowe opted to sign with Detroit and the NBA.

Rowe played eight seasons (1971–1979) in the National Basketball Association as a member of the Detroit Pistons and the Boston Celtics. He averaged 11.6 points per game in his career and appeared in the 1976 NBA All-Star Game.

At UCLA, he was a member of three national championship teams coached by John Wooden: 1969, 1970 and 1971. He was one of only 4 players to have started on 3 NCAA championship teams; the others were all teammates at UCLA: Lew Alcindor, Henry Bibby and Lynn Shackelford.

In 1993, Rowe was inducted to the UCLA Athletics Hall of Fame.

== NBA career statistics ==
Legend
GP	Games played	GS	Games started	MPG	Minutes per game
FG%	Field goal percentage	3P%	3-point field goal percentage	FT%	Free throw percentage
RPG	Rebounds per game	APG	Assists per game	SPG	Steals per game
BPG	Blocks per game	PPG	Points per game	**Bold**	Career high

=== Regular season ===
Year	Team	GP	MPG	FG%	FT%	RPG	APG	STL	BLK	PPG
1971–72	Detroit	**82**	32.5	.460	.669	8.5	1.2	–	–	11.3
1972–73	Detroit	81	37.1	**.519**	.642	**9.4**	2.1	–	–	**16.1**
1973–74	Detroit	**82**	30.5	.494	.698	6.3	1.7	**.6**	.4	10.7
1974–75	Detroit	**82**	34.0	.483	**.753**	7.1	1.5	**.6**	.5	12.4
1975–76	Detroit	80	**37.5**	.468	.737	8.7	**2.3**	**.6**	**.6**	16.0
1976–77	Boston	79	27.7	.498	.708	7.1	1.4	.3	**.6**	10.1
1977–78	Boston	51	17.9	.451	.742	4.0	.9	.3	.2	6.1
1978–79	Boston	53	23.1	.436	.693	4.6	1.3	.3	.2	6.7
Career		590	31.0	.482	.701	7.2	1.6	.5	.5	11.6
All-Star		1	8.0	.000	.500	2.0	.0	–	–	1.0

=== Playoffs ===
Year	Team	GP	MPG	FG%	FT%	RPG	APG	STL	BLK	PPG
1974	Detroit	7	32.7	.481	.615	7.4	1.6	.4	.9	8.3
1975	Detroit	3	38.3	**.515**	.526	**8.7**	**5.0**	.3	**1.7**	14.7
1976	Detroit	**9**	**38.4**	.477	**.853**	7.8	2.9	**.7**	.9	**15.0**
1977	Boston	**9**	26.3	.471	.759	8.0	1.1	.1	.4	9.6
Career		28	33.1	.481	.726	7.9	2.2	.4	.8	11.5

== Personal life ==
Curtis Rowe is the father of comedian Cameron Rowe.
