= Stu Lantz =

American basketball player and television commentator

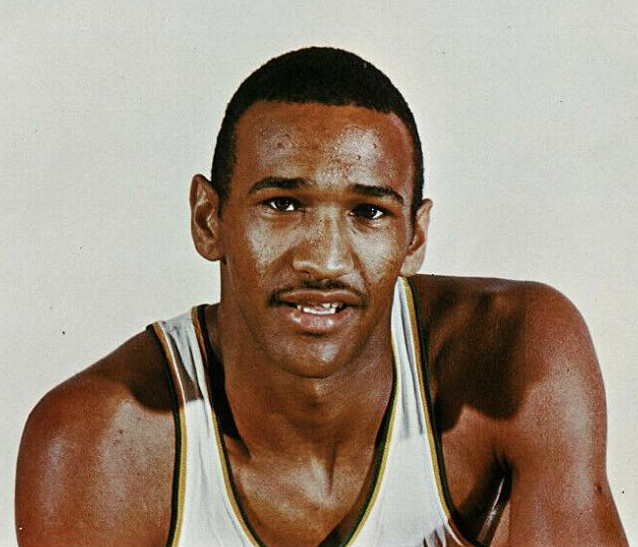
- Lantz in 1969

Personal information
- Born: July 13, 1946 (age 80) Uniontown, Pennsylvania, U.S.
- Listed height: 6 ft 3 in (1.91 m)
- Listed weight: 175 lb (79 kg)

Career information
- High school: Uniontown (Uniontown, Pennsylvania)
- College: Nebraska (1965–1968)
- NBA draft: 1968: 3rd round, 23rd overall pick
- Drafted by: San Diego Rockets
- Playing career: 1968–1977
- Position: Shooting guard / point guard
- Number: 22, 23

Career history
- 1968–1972: San Diego / Houston Rockets
- 1972–1974: Detroit Pistons
- 1974: New Orleans Jazz
- 1974–1977: Los Angeles Lakers

Career highlights
- No. 22 retired by Nebraska Cornhuskers

Career NBA statistics
- Points: 6,782 (12.4 ppg)
- Rebounds: 1,820 (3.3 rpg)
- Assists: 1,566 (2.9 apg)
- Stats at NBA.com
- Stats at Basketball Reference

Stuart Burrell Lantz (born July 13, 1946) is an American former professional basketball player who is a television commentator for the Los Angeles Lakers of the National Basketball Association (NBA) on Spectrum SportsNet. He played college basketball for the Nebraska Cornhuskers.

== Early years ==
Lantz attended Uniontown Area High School. He accepted a basketball scholarship from the University of Nebraska–Lincoln. In the 1966–67 season, he contributed to the Cornhuskers' first 20-win season (20–5), their first NIT Tournament bid and earning a second-place finish in the Big Eight Conference.

Lantz became the school's first two-time All-Big Eight selection. He led the Cornhuskers in scoring and rebounding in both the 1966–67 and 1967–68 seasons. He finished his college career with a 16.9 points, 48.5 percent shooting and 7.6 rebound average.

In 1989, Lantz' number 22 jersey was the second retired by the school. In 2001, he was inducted into the Nebraska Basketball Hall of Fame.

== Professional career ==
Lantz played in the National Basketball Association from 1968 until 1976. He was selected by the San Diego Rockets in the third round (1st pick, 23rd overall) of the 1968 NBA draft and by the Oakland Oaks in the 1968 ABA Draft.

In the 1970–71 season, Lantz averaged 20.6 points and 5 rebounds per game for the San Diego Rockets.

In the 1976–77 season, he injured his back during a training camp scrimmage and never fully recovered during the year. On July 2, 1977, Lantz announced his retirement at 30 years old (a week and a half before his 31st birthday) because of the injury.

== Broadcast career ==
Lantz has been the Lakers' color commentator since 1987, sharing the microphone with Chick Hearn, Paul Sunderland, Joel Meyers and now Bill Macdonald on Spectrum SportsNet. Lantz has been named by the Southern California Sports Broadcasters Association as the best television color commentator on seven occasions. In 2018, he was inducted into the Southern California Sports Broadcasters Hall of Fame. On February 27, 2022, before a home game against the New Orleans Pelicans, the Lakers commemorated Lantz's 35 years broadcasting for the team with a pregame video tribute that featured celebratory messages from Pat Riley, Walt Frazier, Derek Fisher, and Shaquille O'Neal, among other basketball contemporaries.

In 2023, Lantz was named recipient of the 75th Los Angeles Area Emmy Governors Award by the Television Academy, recognizing his “long career in broadcasting, professionalism, and immense popularity.”

The announcement was televised in a surprise fashion in the Spectrum SportsNet studio with his colleagues and Lakers executives, including Jeanie Buss.

He joins other Southern California sports icons Bob Miller, Chick Hearn, Vin Scully, and Kobe Bryant as Governor's Award recipients.

== Career statistics ==
Legend
GP	Games played	GS	Games started	MPG	Minutes per game
FG%	Field goal percentage	3P%	3-point field goal percentage	FT%	Free throw percentage
RPG	Rebounds per game	APG	Assists per game	SPG	Steals per game
BPG	Blocks per game	PPG	Points per game	**Bold**	Career high
*	Led the league

=== NBA ===
==== Regular season ====
Year	Team	GP	MPG	FG%	FT%	RPG	APG	SPG	BPG	PPG
1968–69	San Diego	73	18.9	**.456**	.772	3.2	1.4			7.8
1969–70	San Diego	**82***	30.1	.443	.770	3.1	3.5			14.5
1970–71	San Diego	**82**	37.8	.448	.806	**5.0**	**4.2**			**20.6**
1971–72	Houston	81	**38.2**	.435	.838	4.3	**4.2**			18.5
1972–73	Detroit	51	31.4	.407	.800	3.4	2.7			9.6
1973–74	Detroit	50	19.6	.427	.848	2.3	1.9	**.8**	.1	8.9
1974–75	New Orleans	19	18.6	.339	.887	1.3	1.6	.6	.1	6.6
1974–75	L.A. Lakers	56	25.5	.424	.824	3.0	2.8	**.8**	**.2**	9.3
1975–76	L.A. Lakers	53	16.1	.417	**.899**	1.9	1.4	.5	.1	4.7
Career		547	27.9	.435	.814	3.3	2.9	.7	.1	12.4

==== Playoffs ====
Year	Team	GP	MPG	FG%	FT%	RPG	APG	SPG	BPG	PPG
1969	San Diego	6	**34.7**	.435	.778	3.5	1.7			**13.5**
1974	Detroit	**7**	32.4	**.475**	**.875**	**4.1**	**2.0**	.3	.0	12.0
Career		13	33.5	.453	.831	3.8	1.8	.3	.0	12.7
