= John Mengelt =

American basketball player (born 1949)

Personal information
- Born: October 16, 1949 (age 77) La Crosse, Wisconsin, U.S.
- Listed height: 6 ft 2 in (1.88 m)
- Listed weight: 195 lb (88 kg)

Career information
- High school: Wendell Willkie (Elwood, Indiana)
- College: Auburn (1968–1971)
- NBA draft: 1971: 2nd round, 21st overall pick
- Drafted by: Cincinnati Royals
- Playing career: 1971–1981
- Position: Shooting guard
- Number: 15

Career history
- 1971–1972: Cincinnati Royals / Kansas City-Omaha Kings
- 1972–1976: Detroit Pistons
- 1976–1980: Chicago Bulls
- 1980–1981: Latte Matese Caserta
- 1981: Golden State Warriors

Career highlights
- 2× First-team All-SEC (1970, 1971); Second-team All-SEC (1969); No. 15 retired by Auburn Tigers

Career NBA statistics
- Points: 6,218 (9.8 ppg)
- Rebounds: 1,221 (1.9 rpg)
- Assists: 1,329 (2.1 apg)
- Stats at NBA.com
- Stats at Basketball Reference

John P. Mengelt (born October 16, 1949) is an American former professional basketball player. He played ten seasons in the National Basketball Association (NBA). Mengelt played college basketball for the Auburn Tigers.

== Early life ==
A two-year starter at Wendell Willkie High School (now Elwood High School) in Elwood, Indiana, Mengelt was named all-conference two years, named an Indiana All-Star (sponsored by the Indianapolis Star) and was selected twice to the Indiana all-state team.

Mengelt also participated in football (All-State as a Senior), baseball and track & field in high school.

== College career ==
A 6’2" guard, Mengelt played for Auburn University. As a sophomore in 1968–69, he led the Tigers in scoring with 19.4 points per game to go with 4.2 rebounds and 2.4 assists per game, shooting .525 from the field and .807 from the free throw line as the Tigers were 15–10. Mengelt was voted second team ALL-SEC UPI and AP and first team by the coaches.

As a junior in 1969–70, he led the 15–11 team in scoring with a new school record of 26.8 points per game to go with 6.0 rebounds and 2.0 assists per game while shooting .465 from the field and .800 from the free throw line. On February 14, 1970, he set an Auburn record with 60 points in a game against the University of Alabama He was named first team All-Southeastern Conference (SEC).

In his senior season of 1970–71, Mengelt averaged a still-standing school-record 28.3 points per game as the Tigers went 11–15. ], a 121-78 Tigers victory. Mengelt still holds the record for free throws made in a season (208 in 1970–71) and is second in Auburn history in free throws made in a game (17 on March 2, 1970, against the University of Kentucky). Besides the 60-point game, he holds the next three high-point games of 48 vs. Vanderbilt University, 47 vs. Ole Miss and 45 vs. North Carolina State University. As a senior, he also averaged 4.1 rebounds and 3.5 assists per game with a .484 field goal percentage and .812 free throw percentage. He was named first-team All-SEC. Mengelt was also named All-American in both his junior and senior seasons.

He is Auburn's fifth all-time leading scorer with 1,920 points despite playing only three varsity seasons while all ahead of him played four. He remains number one in career scoring average with 24.8. His number 15 is one of six jerseys retired at Auburn. Mengelt has the 9th highest career scoring average in SEC history (24.8) and only 7 players have averaged more than him in one year (28.6). Mengelt is also one of 10 Division 1 players to score 60+ points against a division 1 opponent.

== Professional career ==
Mengelt was drafted (21st overall) of the 1971 NBA draft by the Cincinnati Royals.

As a rookie with the Royals, he played in 78 games, averaging 18.4 minutes per game as a backup guard and averaging 10.0 points, 1.9 rebounds and 1.9 assists per game. By far his most productive game came on February 25, 1972, as he scored 32 points against the Los Angeles Lakers.

Prior to his second season, the Royals moved and became the Kansas City-Omaha Kings. After playing 12 games with the Kings, on November 9, 1972, he was traded to the Detroit Pistons, for whom he played another 67 games. For the season, he averaged 9.7 points, 2.3 rebounds and 1.9 assists per game.

In his third season of 1974–75, he played 77 games, averaging 8.8 points and a career-high 2.7 rebounds with 1.9 assists (for the third consecutive season) per game as the Pistons posted a 52–30 record, losing the Western Conference semifinals in seven games to the Chicago Bulls. He had his second career game of 30 points or more with 30 on December 1, 1973, against the Phoenix Suns. In 1974–75, Mengelt played in 80 games with a career-high 24.9 minutes per game, averaging a then career-best 11.0 points per game to go with 2.4 rebounds and 2.5 assists per game. On December 14, 1974, he set a career high with 33 points against the Philadelphia 76ers, and he scored 30 on March 9, 1975, against the Kings.

The 1975–76 season, his fifth in the NBA and third full season with the Pistons, he played 67 games, averaging 10.7 points, 1.7 rebounds and 1.6 assists per game. On January 18, 1976, he scored a season-high 32 points against the Phoenix Suns.

On November 18, 1976, he was sold to the Chicago Bulls, for whom in 1976–77 he played 61 games, averaging 8.3 points, 1.8 rebounds and 1.9 assists. The Bulls went 44-38 and lost the opening-round playoff series to the Portland Trail Blazers.

In 1977–78, he played in a career-high 81 games, averaging 10.3 points, 1.6 rebounds and a career-high 2.9 assists per game. In 1978–79, he tied his career-best of 11.0 points per game to go with 1.6 rebounds and 2.5 assists. The 1979–80 season was his fourth and final in Chicago. Injuries limited him to 36 games and 6.1 points per game.

Mengelt played one season in Italy between his last season with the Bulls and his final NBA season with the Warriors in 1980–81, for whom he played just two games, ending his professional career.

Mengelt was a fan favorite wherever he played, earning the nickname "Crash" from Royals teammate Norm Van Lier for his willingness to dive after loose balls.

He retired with 6,218 career points.

== Personal life ==
After retiring as a player, Mengelt worked in TV for about 20 years serving as color analyst for the Pistons, Bulls, and DePaul basketball while also doing some national work for ABC. During that time, he also worked for Professional Athletes Career Enterprises, a startup organization that assists retiring professional athletes move successfully into second careers. He also continued to grow his own successful executive search firm, Breckenridge Partners, located in the Chicago suburb of Lake Forest, Illinois Breckenridge Partners has executed over 1,000 retained executive searches working in various industries including Healthcare, Higher Education, Financial Services, Technology, Manufacturing, Distribution and Consulting and Not for Profits. Some of Breckenridge Partners clients have included IBM, Walt Disney World, One America Financial Partners, Applied Biosystems, CR Bard, Textron and Public Accounting Firm Ernst & Young and several Not for Profits, and Universities. As an avocation, Mengelt also spent 20+ years in broadcasting basketball games for WGN, ESPN and ABC.

In 1995, Mengelt was inducted into the Alabama Sports Hall of Fame and in 1996 into the Indiana Basketball Hall of Fame.

== Career statistics ==
Legend
GP	Games played	GS	Games started	MPG	Minutes per game
FG%	Field goal percentage	3P%	3-point field goal percentage	FT%	Free throw percentage
RPG	Rebounds per game	APG	Assists per game	SPG	Steals per game
BPG	Blocks per game	PPG	Points per game	**Bold**	Career high

=== NBA ===
==== Regular season ====
Year	Team	GP	GS	MPG	FG%	3P%	FT%	RPG	APG	SPG	BPG	PPG
1971–72	Cincinnati	78		18.4	.474		.825	1.9	1.9			10.0
1972–73	Kansas City–Omaha	12		17.7	.382		.579	1.8	2.1			5.3
1972–73	Detroit	67		21.4	.504		.823	2.4	1.9			10.5
1973–74	Detroit	77		20.2	.446		.795	**2.7**	1.9	**.9**	**.1**	8.8
1974–75	Detroit	80		**24.9**	.479		**.851**	2.4	2.5	**.9**	**.1**	**11.0**
1975–76	Detroit	67		16.5	.489		.810	1.7	1.6	.6	**.1**	10.7
1976–77	Chicago	61	1	19.3	.456		.788	1.8	1.9	.6	**.1**	8.3
1977–78	Chicago	**81**	8	21.8	.481		.773	1.6	**2.9**	.6	.0	10.3
1978–79	Chicago	75	**20**	22.7	.491		.824	1.6	2.5	.6	**.1**	**11.0**
1979–80	Chicago	36	0	10.8	**.542**	.000	.796	.6	1.1	.3	.0	6.1
1980–81	Golden State	2		5.5	.000	–	–	.0	1.0	.0	.0	.0
Career		636	29	20.1	.479	.000	.809	1.9	2.1	.7	.1	9.8

==== Playoffs ====
Year	Team	GP	MPG	FG%	FT%	RPG	APG	SPG	BPG	PPG
1974	Detroit	4	9.8	.357	.875	1.8	1.5	.5	.0	4.3
1975	Detroit	3	21.7	.391	.778	**2.7**	**3.0**	.3	**.3**	8.3
1976	Detroit	**9**	13.2	**.607**	.704	1.6	1.1	.4	.1	9.7
1977	Chicago	3	**22.3**	.538	**.909**	1.3	2.7	**1.3**	.0	**12.7**
Career		19	15.3	.521	.782	1.7	1.7	.6	.1	8.8

== See also ==
- List of NCAA Division I men's basketball players with 60 or more points in a game
