= Chris Ford =

American basketball player and coach (1949–2023)

Personal information
- Born: January 11, 1949 Atlantic City, New Jersey, U.S.
- Died: January 17, 2023 (aged 74) Philadelphia, Pennsylvania, U.S.
- Listed height: 6 ft 5 in (1.96 m)
- Listed weight: 190 lb (86 kg)

Career information
- High school: Holy Spirit (Absecon, New Jersey)
- College: Villanova (1969–1972)
- NBA draft: 1972: 2nd round, 17th overall pick
- Drafted by: Detroit Pistons
- Playing career: 1972–1982
- Position: Shooting guard
- Number: 42
- Coaching career: 1983–2004

Career history

Playing
- 1972–1978: Detroit Pistons
- 1978–1982: Boston Celtics

Coaching
- 1983–1990: Boston Celtics (assistant)
- 1990–1995: Boston Celtics
- 1996–1998: Milwaukee Bucks
- 1999–2000: Los Angeles Clippers
- 2001–2003: Brandeis University
- 2003–2004: Philadelphia 76ers (assistant)
- 2004: Philadelphia 76ers (interim)

Career highlights
- As player: NBA champion (1981); No. 42 retired by Villanova Wildcats; Robert V. Geasey Trophy (1972); As head coach: NBA All-Star Game head coach (1991); As assistant coach: 2× NBA champion (1984, 1986)

Career statistics
- Points: 7,314 (9.2 ppg)
- Assists: 2,719 (3.4 apg)
- Steals: 1,152 (1.6 spg)
- Stats at NBA.com
- Stats at Basketball Reference

Christopher Joseph Ford (January 11, 1949 – January 17, 2023) was an American professional basketball player and head coach in the National Basketball Association (NBA). Nicknamed "the Mad Bomber", Ford played most of his NBA career with the Detroit Pistons before finishing his career as a member of the Boston Celtics. In the Celtics' season opener in 1979, he was credited with making the first official three-point shot in NBA history. He won an NBA championship with the Celtics in 1981.

Between 1990 and 1995, Ford was the head coach of the Celtics. He proceeded to coach for three other NBA franchises.

== College career ==
A 6-foot-5 (1.96 m) guard from Atlantic City, Ford played high school basketball at Holy Spirit High School in Absecon, New Jersey. He averaged a Cape-Atlantic League record 33 ppg as a senior, and finished with 1,507 career points, which as of 2021, was still a school record. Ford then signed to play at Villanova University, sat out his first year as required at the time, and then quickly established himself, averaging 16.1 ppg, helping the team advance to the regional finals of the 1970 NCAA tournament, losing to St. Bonaventure 97–74, with the Bonnies led by 26 points by Bob Lanier, a future teammate of Ford with the Detroit Pistons.

Villanova and Ford continued their winning ways, advancing in the 1971 NCAA tournament to the championship game, losing to UCLA and legendary coach John Wooden 68–62. Ford averaged 13.8 ppg on the season. In his senior year, Ford averaged a stellar 17.9 ppg, 6.4 rpg, again helping lead Villanova to the 1972 NCAA tournament, with the team losing in the regional semi-final to Penn 78–67. For his college career, Ford averaged 15.8 ppg, 6.0 rpg, leading Villanova to three consecutive NCAA appearances.

== Professional career ==
Ford was drafted to the Detroit Pistons in the 1972 NBA draft (2nd round, 17th overall pick). Ford established himself as a defensive oriented regular for Detroit, helping lead the team to four straight post-season berths (1974–1977). His averages peaked in the tumultuous 1976-77 Detroit Pistons season with 12.3 PPG, 3.3 RPG, 4.1 APG, and 7th in steals (179) in the NBA.

In October 1978, he was traded by Detroit with a 1981 2nd round draft pick to the Boston Celtics for Earl Tatum. He averaged a career high with 15.6 PPG in the 1978–79 season In 1979–80, the NBA introduced the three-point field goal to its game. In the Celtics' season opener against the Houston Rockets on October 12, 1979, Ford made a 3-pointer with 3:48 remaining in the first quarter. Three days later, an NBA press release credited him with making the first 3-pointer in league history, due to his game being "the first game according to start time". Kevin Grevey of the Washington Bullets made a 3-pointer the same night against the Philadelphia 76ers, but his game started 35 minutes later than Ford's. It is not clear the exact time their respective baskets occurred. In 1980–81, the Celtics won the 1981 NBA Finals. He retired after the 1981–82 season with 10-year career averages of 9.2 ppg, 3.4 apg, and 1.6 steals per game, remaining in the top 100 for his career in steals per game.

Ford also appeared as a member of the Detroit team in the fictional basketball comedy film The Fish That Saved Pittsburgh in 1979 alongside the Pistons teammates Bob Lanier, Eric Money, John Shumate, Kevin Porter, and Leon Douglas.

== Coaching career ==
Ford served as an assistant at Boston College before doing some radio work. Ford became an assistant coach with Boston, first under KC Jones and then Jimmy Rodgers, helping the Celtics to NBA championships in 1984 and 1986. The 1990 NBA playoffs was a disaster for Rodgers, in which Boston lost in the First Round after winning the first two games that saw him fired two days after the series ended. On June 12, 1990, Ford was promoted to head coach for the Celtics. In his first season, the Celtics (a mix of aging greats such as Larry Bird to go with young players such as Brian Shaw) got off to a 29–5 start and as tradition for the wins leader (35–12) in the conferences for the All-Star Game, Ford was selected to coach the Eastern All-Stars in the 1991 NBA All-Star Game; as a show of who was in charge after seeing a play he didn't like, Ford went up to a player and asked why the play was called like that only to get a response of "Because Larry...", for which he responded by saying to listen only to Ford. Despite a back injury to Bird that saw him miss a quarter of the season, the Celtics won 56 games to be the #2 seed and make the postseason for the twelfth straight year. They narrowly won in the First Round to set up a matchup with the defending champion Detroit Pistons that saw them win two of the first three games, but Detroit went on to win the next three games. The following year saw the Celtics win 51 games with Bird missing half the year. They again went to the second round and lost despite having a lead, this time blowing a 2–1 series lead to the Cleveland Cavaliers by losing in seven games. In August 1992, Bird retired. The 1992–93 season would be the last with Kevin McHale on the roster, and the team struggled to 48 wins. Reggie Lewis averaged twenty points a game for the team. As the four seed, the Celtics were matched against the Charlotte Hornets. During Game 1 of the First Round on April 29, 1993, Lewis collapsed on the court. He eventually left the game with dizziness and shortness of breath, having scored 17 points in the only Celtic win of the postseason. Less than three months later, during a workout in trying to get back in shape to play for the following year, Lewis had a sudden cardiac death on the court due to a heart defect with hypertrophic cardiomyopathy. The 1993–94 season (the last with Robert Parish) went from mediocrity to disaster, complete with the Celtics losing thirteen in a row for a winless February as the 32-win Celtics missed the playoffs for the first time since 1979. The following season was the last for Ford as coach, which saw them make the playoffs as the eighth seed despite being 35–47. They lost in four games in the First Round. He was replaced by former teammate M. L. Carr, who had been named general manager of the Celtics the previous year.

On June 15, 1996, Ford was hired to coach the Milwaukee Bucks, who had not made the postseason in five years and had moved Mike Dunleavy to just serve as vice president of basketball operations; Ford cited the talent of Glenn Robinson and Vin Baker as a "great opportunity." He was fired on August 26, 1998, with team owner Herb Kohl stating, "Chris Ford has in many respects done a good job. But we think in order to maximize the talent that we have, the best thing is to go and find a coach of a nature, of a sort that would ensure that we reach the next level." Ford was fired with a year remaining on his contract and was later replaced by George Karl.

On January 13, 1999, after four months in the interview process, Ford was hired as head coach of the Los Angeles Clippers on a three-year deal; the other major coaching candidate in Jim Brewer was retained as an assistant focused on team development (the team was among the youngest in the league) such as their recent #1 draft pick Michael Olowokandi. The team had won 17 games the season before he was hired. In the strike-shortened 1998–99 season, the Clippers proceeded to win just nine of fifty games, which saw them start the season 0–17 to tie the record for worst start in NBA history. On February 3, 2000, he was fired by the Clippers, who had lost sixteen of their last eighteen games; he was replaced on an interim basis by Jim Todd, who previously had coached two games in December when Ford had back spasms. In 2003, he had been serving as an assistant coach on the staff of Randy Ayers on the Philadelphia 76ers but suddenly became the head coach when Ayers was fired with the team at 21–31. Ford went 12–18 to close out the season.

In October 2001, Ford was named head coach at Brandeis University, a Division III school in Waltham, Massachusetts. He coached there until 2003.

Ford then became a scout for the 76ers and was also a coaching consultant for the New York Knicks.

== Death ==
On January 17, 2023, Ford died at a hospital in Philadelphia from complications of a heart attack he had earlier in the month. He was 74. He was survived by his wife Kathy, three children and seven grandchildren.

== Career statistics ==
Legend
GP	Games played	GS	Games started	MPG	Minutes per game
FG%	Field goal percentage	3P%	3-point field goal percentage	FT%	Free throw percentage
RPG	Rebounds per game	APG	Assists per game	SPG	Steals per game
BPG	Blocks per game	PPG	Points per game	**Bold**	Career high
†	Won an NBA championship	*	Led the league

=== NBA ===
==== Regular season ====
Year	Team	GP	GS	MPG	FG%	3P%	FT%	RPG	APG	SPG	BPG	PPG
1972–73	Detroit	74		20.8	.479		.645	3.6	2.6			6.4
1973–74	Detroit	**82***		25.1	.444		.740	3.7	3.4	1.8	.2	7.1
1974–75	Detroit	80		24.5	.474		.663	3.4	2.9	1.4	.3	5.9
1975–76	Detroit	**82**		26.8	.426		.722	3.5	3.3	**2.2**	.3	8.4
1976–77	Detroit	**82**		31.0	.476		.771	3.3	4.1	**2.2**	.3	12.3
1977–78	Detroit	**82**		31.5	**.481**		.734	3.3	4.6	2.0	.2	10.5
1978–79	Detroit	3		**36.0**	.371		**.875**	**6.0**	1.7	.3	.3	11.0
1978–79	Boston	78		33.7	.474		.753	3.3	**4.7**	1.5	.3	**15.6**
1979–80	Boston	73	73	29.0	.465	**.427**	.754	2.5	2.9	1.5	**.4**	11.2
1980–81†	Boston	**82**	**75**	33.2	.443	.330	.736	2.0	3.6	1.2	.3	8.9
1981–82	Boston	76	53	20.9	.418	.317	.696	1.4	1.9	.6	.1	5.7
Career		794	201	37.8	.460	.375	.731	3.0	3.4	1.6	.3	9.2

==== Playoffs ====
Year	Team	GP	GS	MPG	FG%	3P%	FT%	RPG	APG	SPG	BPG	PPG
1974	Detroit	5		18.8	.471		.667	3.9	1.4	.4	.4	4.0
1975	Detroit	3		27.3	**.545**		–	4.3	3.3	.3	.0	4.0
1976	Detroit	9		30.7	.407		**.800**	4.0	**4.4**	1.2	.6	8.7
1977	Detroit	3		**33.7**	.409		.556	**6.3**	4.0	**2.3**	.0	**13.7**
1980	Boston	9		31.0	.430	.154	**.800**	2.8	2.3	1.6	**.7**	9.1
1981†	Boston	**17**		29.8	.452	.280	.600	2.6	2.7	.8	.1	9.1
1982	Boston	12		11.5	.476	**.286**	.714	1.3	1.3	.3	.1	3.9
Career		58		25.5	.440	.244	.688	2.9	2.6	.9	.3	7.5

=== Coaching record ===
Legend
Regular season	G	Games coached	W	Games won	L	Games lost	W–L %	Win–loss %
Playoffs	PG	Playoff games	PW	Playoff wins	PL	Playoff losses	PW–L %	Playoff win–loss %

Team	Year	G	W	L	W–L%	Finish	PG	PW	PL	PW–L%	Result
Boston	1990–91	82	56	26	.683	1st in Atlantic	11	5	6	.455	Lost in Conf. Semi-finals
Boston	1991–92	82	51	31	.622	1st in Atlantic	10	6	4	.600	Lost in Conf. Semi-finals
Boston	1992–93	82	48	34	.585	2nd in Atlantic	4	1	3	.350	Lost in first round
Boston	1993–94	82	32	50	.390	5th in Atlantic	—	—	—	—	Missed Playoffs
Boston	1994–95	82	35	47	.427	3rd in Atlantic	4	1	3	.350	Lost in first round
Milwaukee	1996–97	82	33	49	.402	7th in Central	—	—	—	—	Missed Playoffs
Milwaukee	1997–98	82	36	46	.439	7th in Central	—	—	—	—	Missed Playoffs
L.A. Clippers	1998–99	50	9	41	.180	7th in Pacific	—	—	—	—	Missed Playoffs
L.A. Clippers	1999–00	45	11	34	.244	(fired)	—	—	—	—	—
Philadelphia	2003–04	30	12	18	.400	5th in Atlantic	—	—	—	—	Missed Playoffs
**Career**		699	323	376	.462		29	13	16	.448	
