= George Trapp =

American basketball player

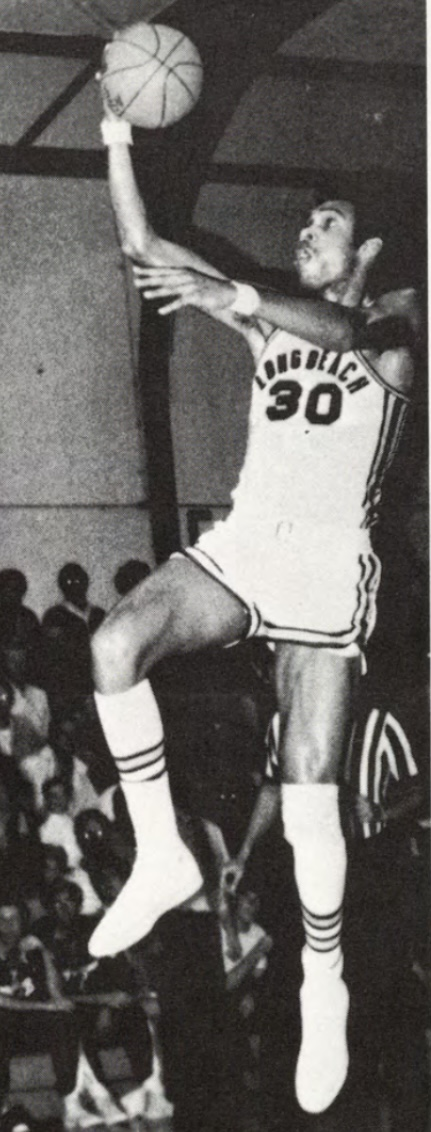
- Trapp as a senior at Long Beach State

Personal information
- Born: July 11, 1948 Detroit, Michigan, U. S.
- Died: January 21, 2002 (aged 53) Detroit, Michigan, U. S.
- Listed height: 6 ft 8 in (2.03 m)
- Listed weight: 205 lb (93 kg)

Career information
- High school: Highland Park (Highland Park, Michigan); Monrovia (Monrovia, California)
- College: Pasadena CC (1967–1969); Long Beach State (1969–1971)
- NBA draft: 1971: 1st round, 5th overall pick
- Drafted by: Atlanta Hawks
- Playing career: 1971–1979
- Position: Power forward / center
- Number: 30, 31

Career history
- 1971–1973: Atlanta Hawks
- 1973–1976: Detroit Pistons
- 1978: Rochester Zeniths
- 1978–1979: U/Tex Wranglers

Career highlights
- 2× PCAA Player of the Year (1970, 1971); 2× First-team All-PCAA (1970, 1971)

Career NBA statistics
- Points: 3,353 (8.8 ppg)
- Rebounds: 1,466 (3.9 rpg)
- Assists: 375 (1.0 apg)
- Stats at NBA.com
- Stats at Basketball Reference

George Trapp Jr. (July 11, 1948 – January 21, 2002) was an American professional basketball player.

== Amateur career ==
A 6'8" forward/center from Monrovia, California by way of Detroit, Trapp played his senior year of high school basketball at Monrovia High School in 1966–67 where Trapp contributed to the Wildcats first CIF basketball Championship. Trapp then went on to play college basketball, initially at Pasadena City College, leading the team to a state community college title, then transferring to Long Beach State, following PCC coach Jerry Tarkanian who had taken the head coaching position at LBSU. Trapp won two Pacific Coast Athletic Association MVP Awards with Long Beach. In 1971, his senior year, Trapp led Long Beach State to the Elite Eight of the 1971 NCAA Division I men's basketball tournament, but the team lost 57–55 to UCLA, the eventual winner of the tournament.

== Professional career ==
After his college career ended, Trapp was selected by the Atlanta Hawks with the fifth pick of the 1971 NBA draft. He played six seasons in the NBA with the Hawks (1971–1973) and Detroit Pistons (1973–77), and averaged 8.8 points per game over his career. He was known for his outside shooting and "electrifying drives to the hoop".

His best scoring season was his second year with Atlanta when he averaged 11.3 ppg and 5.9 rpg in 24.1 mpg as a top reserve in the 1972-73 Atlanta Hawks season. He was traded to his hometown Detroit Pistons for a first-round draft choice that off-season. With Detroit, he became a key reserve, helping the Pistons to the post-season in each of his 4 years with the team. After his release by Detroit at the start of the 1976-77 season, he played for the Rochester in the Continental Basketball Association in the 1977–78 season, and then briefly for the U/Tex Wranglers in the Philippine Basketball Association in 1979.

== Personal life ==
His brother John Trapp was drafted with the 15th overall pick in the 1968 NBA draft. Both Trapp brothers played at Pasadena City College (PCC) and are members of the PCC Athletics Hall of Fame, with George honored in 2013. George is also a member of the Long Beach State Athletics Hall of Fame, inducted in 1991.

On January 9, 2002, Trapp was stabbed in the stomach during a fight with a roommate in Detroit. He died twelve days later.

== Career statistics ==
Legend
GP	Games played	GS	Games started	MPG	Minutes per game
FG%	Field goal percentage	3P%	3-point field goal percentage	FT%	Free throw percentage
RPG	Rebounds per game	APG	Assists per game	SPG	Steals per game
BPG	Blocks per game	PPG	Points per game	**Bold**	Career high
*	Led the league

=== NBA ===
==== Regular season ====
Year	Team	GP	MPG	FG%	FT%	RPG	APG	SPG	BPG	PPG
1971–72	Atlanta	60	14.8	.371	.755	3.1	.9			6.6
1972–73	Atlanta	77	**24.1**	.436	**.773**	**5.9**	**1.6**			**11.3**
1973–74	Detroit	**82***	18.2	.481	.739	3.8	1.0	**.6**	**.4**	9.3
1974–75	Detroit	78	18.9	.442	.756	3.5	.8	.5	.2	8.7
1975–76	Detroit	76	14.4	.462	.716	3.0	.7	.4	.3	8.1
1976–77	Detroit	6	11.3	**.517**	.750	1.7	.5	.0	.2	5.5
Career		379	18.1	.444	.752	3.9	1.0	.5	.3	8.8

==== Playoffs ====
Year	Team	GP	MPG	FG%	FT%	RPG	APG	SPG	BPG	PPG
1972	Atlanta	6	11.0	.432	.375	3.0	.8			6.8
1973	Atlanta	6	16.5	.344	.600	3.5	.5			4.2
1974	Detroit	7	17.0	**.588**	**1.000**	3.1	.3	.0	**.7**	8.9
1975	Detroit	3	**27.0**	.545	.714	**7.3**	**1.3**	.0	.0	**13.7**
1976	Detroit	**9**	17.0	.416	.833	3.9	1.0	**.4**	.4	9.9
Career		31	16.7	.462	.700	3.8	.7	.2	.5	8.3

== See also ==
- List of homicides in Michigan
