= 1976 NBA Finals =

1976 basketball championship series

Team	Coach	Wins
Boston Celtics	Tom Heinsohn	4
Phoenix Suns	John MacLeod	2
- Dates: May 23 – June 6
- MVP: Jo Jo White (Boston Celtics)
- Hall of Famers: Celtics: Dave Cowens (1991); John Havlicek (1984); Don Nelson (2012, coach); Charlie Scott (2018); Jo Jo White (2015); Suns: Pat Riley (2008, coach); Paul Westphal (2019); Coaches: Tom Heinsohn (1986, player/2015, coach); Officials: Darell Garretson (2016); Earl Strom (1995); Announcers: Rick Barry (1987/Player); Mendy Rudolph (2007/Official)
- Eastern finals: Celtics defeated Cavaliers, 4–2
- Western finals: Suns defeated Warriors, 4–3

The 1976 NBA World Championship Series was the championship round for the National Basketball Association (NBA)'s 1975–76 season, and the culmination of the season's playoffs. The Eastern Conference champion Boston Celtics defeated the Western Conference champion Phoenix Suns in six games to win their 13th NBA Championship. Celtics point guard Jo Jo White was named as the series MVP.

== Background ==
=== Phoenix Suns ===
The Phoenix Suns entered the NBA as an expansion team in the 1968–69 season. Prior to 1976, they only made the playoffs once, losing to the Los Angeles Lakers in the first round of the 1970 NBA playoffs. Before that, the Suns lost a coin flip to the Milwaukee Bucks prior to the 1969 NBA draft, losing out on selecting Kareem Abdul-Jabbar. Phoenix ultimately selected Neal Walk, who became a bust. The Suns redeemed themselves in the 1975 NBA draft by selecting Alvan Adams fourth overall.

With Adams fortifying the center position, and with new addition Paul Westphal and Dick Van Arsdale providing the scoring punch, the Suns reached the playoffs for the second time, finishing with 42 wins. The Suns defeated the Seattle SuperSonics in six games in the conference semifinals, before achieving a bigger upset in dethroning the previous year's champions, the top seeded Golden State Warriors in seven games. The Suns reached their first NBA Finals.

=== Boston Celtics ===
The Boston Celtics were seeking to make up for the lost opportunity they squandered in the 1975 NBA playoffs. That year, they finished with 60 wins, but lost to the Washington Bullets in the conference finals. They kept the core of the team that won the 1974 NBA Finals, but made some tweaks, including trading Westphal to Phoenix for Charlie Scott. The Celtics won 54 games in the 1975–76 season, then defeated the Buffalo Braves and the "Miracle of Richfield" Cleveland Cavaliers in six games each to reach their 14th NBA Finals. Boston was seeking its 13th NBA title.

=== Road to the Finals ===
Phoenix Suns (Western Conference champion)		Boston Celtics (Eastern Conference champion)
# / Western Conference; # / Team / W / L / PCT / GB; 1 / z-Golden State Warriors / 59 / 23 / .720 / –; 2 / x-Seattle SuperSonics / 43 / 39 / .524 / 16; 3 / x-Phoenix Suns / 42 / 40 / .512 / 17; 4 / y-Milwaukee Bucks / 38 / 44 / .463 / 21; 5 / x-Detroit Pistons / 36 / 46 / .439 / 23; 6 / Los Angeles Lakers / 40 / 42 / .488 / 19; 7 / Portland Trail Blazers / 37 / 45 / .451 / 22; 8 / Kansas City Kings / 31 / 51 / .378 / 28; 9 / Chicago Bulls / 24 / 58 / .293 / 35; 3rd seed in the West, 8th best league record	Regular season	# / Eastern Conference; # / Team / W / L / PCT / GB; 1 / z-Boston Celtics / 54 / 28 / .659 / –; 2 / y-Cleveland Cavaliers / 49 / 33 / .598 / 5; 3 / x-Washington Bullets / 48 / 34 / .585 / 6; 4 / x-Philadelphia 76ers / 46 / 36 / .561 / 8; 5 / x-Buffalo Braves / 46 / 36 / .561 / 8; 6 / Houston Rockets / 40 / 42 / .488 / 14; 7 / New York Knicks / 38 / 44 / .463 / 16; 8 / New Orleans Jazz / 38 / 44 / .463 / 16; 9 / Atlanta Hawks / 29 / 53 / .354 / 25; 1st seed in the East, 2nd best league record
Earned first-round bye	First round	Earned first-round bye
Defeated the (2) Seattle SuperSonics, 4–2	Conference semifinals	Defeated the (5) Buffalo Braves, 4–2
Defeated the (1) Golden State Warriors, 4–3	Conference finals	Defeated the (2) Cleveland Cavaliers, 4–2

=== Regular season series ===
Boston swept the four-game regular season series.

December 26, 1975

Boston Celtics 112, Phoenix Suns 106

Arizona Veterans Memorial Coliseum, Phoenix, Arizona

January 21, 1976

Phoenix Suns 100, Boston Celtics 114

Boston Garden, Boston, Massachusetts

February 13, 1976

Boston Celtics 109, Phoenix Suns 108

Arizona Veterans Memorial Coliseum, Phoenix, Arizona

March 31, 1976

Phoenix Suns 102, Boston Celtics 122

Boston Garden, Boston, Massachusetts

== Series summary ==
Game	Date	Home team	Result	Road team
Game 1	May 23	Boston Celtics	98–87 (1–0)	Phoenix Suns
Game 2	May 27	Boston Celtics	105–90 (2–0)	Phoenix Suns
Game 3	May 30	Phoenix Suns	105–98 (1–2)	Boston Celtics
Game 4	June 2	Phoenix Suns	109–107 (2–2)	Boston Celtics
Game 5	June 4	Boston Celtics	128–126 (3OT) (3–2)	Phoenix Suns
Game 6	June 6	Phoenix Suns	80–87 (2–4)	Boston Celtics

Boston Celtics defeated Phoenix Suns, 4–2

=== Game 1 ===
CBS

May 23

Boxscore

Phoenix Suns 87, Boston Celtics 98
Scoring by quarter: 20–22, 19–22, 27–27, 21–27
Pts: Alvan Adams 26; Rebs: Curtis Perry 10; Asts: Ricky Sobers 7	Pts: Dave Cowens 25; Rebs: Dave Cowens 21; Asts: Dave Cowens 10
Boston leads series, 1–0

Boston Garden, Boston, Massachusetts
Attendance: 15,320
Referees: Darell Garretson, Jake O'Donnell

Boston won game one with a balanced attack. John Havlicek did not start for the Celtics due to a heel injury. However, Boston coach Tom Heinsohn rushed Havlicek into the game with 7:24 left in the first quarter as Phoenix took an early 10–7 lead, and the Ohio State product played the rest of the game. Dave Cowens recorded a triple-double with 25 points, 21 rebounds, and 10 assists while Jo Jo White shot only 1-for-4 in the first half before making 8-of-11 shots in the second half to keep Phoenix at bay. Phoenix trailed by two at the end of the first quarter, despite 11 first quarter Celtic turnovers. Kevin Stacom scored five straight points, his only points of the game, to put Boston up for good 22–20. Charlie Scott fouled out when he picked up his fifth and sixth fouls in an 11-second span.

=== Game 2 ===
CBS

May 27

Boxscore

Phoenix Suns 90, Boston Celtics 105
Scoring by quarter: 25–24, 16–22, 16–34, 33–25
Pts: Paul Westphal 28; Rebs: Alvan Adams 15; Asts: Adams, Westphall 5 each	Pts: John Havlicek 23; Rebs: Paul Silas 17; Asts: Jo Jo White 9
Boston leads series, 2–0

Boston Garden, Boston, Massachusetts
Attendance: 15,320
Referees: Earl Strom, Joe Gushue

Phoenix lost their twelfth game in a row at the Boston Garden. Boston put the game away with a 20–2 run at the start of the third quarter, giving them a 72–43 lead. The run was started by steals from Jo Jo White and Charlie Scott. Scott made just one of his nine shots in the first half but came alive with 12 points in the third quarter. Boston again started slowly without John Havlicek in the starting lineup, not making a field goal in the first three minutes of the game, again prompting Heinsohn to put Havlicek in the game.

=== Game 3 ===
CBS

May 30

Boxscore

Boston Celtics 98, Phoenix Suns 105
Scoring by quarter: 17–26, 22–26, 26–26, 33–27
Pts: Jo Jo White 24; Rebs: Dave Cowens 17; Asts: Charlie Scott 5	Pts: Alvan Adams 33; Rebs: Alvan Adams 14; Asts: Paul Westphal 6
Boston leads series, 2–1

Arizona Veterans Memorial Coliseum, Phoenix, Arizona
Attendance: 12,884
Referees: Richie Powers, Paul Mihalak

Phoenix held Boston scoreless for nearly five minutes in the second quarter as they went to a 16-point lead. Then, the Suns' Ricky Sobers and Boston's Kevin Stacom got into a fistfight, and both were ejected. Sobers had a good game to that point, and Phoenix coach John MacLeod would later accuse the Celtics of having Stacom bait Sobers into the fight in order to get him out of the game.

The Suns extended the lead to 23 in the third, but Boston began to charge back and cut the lead to two with three minutes left. At that point, Suns rookie center Alvan Adams scored twice, passed off to Paul Westphal for another basket, and then tipped in a Westphal miss. That was enough to get Phoenix a 105–98 win. Adams finished with 33 points and 14 rebounds. Dave Cowens and Charlie Scott both fouled out for the Celtics, and the Celtics also received for two technical fouls.

=== Game 4 ===
CBS

June 2

Boxscore

Boston Celtics 107, Phoenix Suns 109
Scoring by quarter: 30–35, 27–25, 23–27, 27–22
Pts: Jo Jo White 25; Rebs: Paul Silas 14; Asts: Jo Jo White 5	Pts: Paul Westphal 28; Rebs: Gar Heard 15; Asts: Paul Westphal 9
Series tied, 2–2

Arizona Veterans Memorial Coliseum, Phoenix, Arizona
Attendance: 13,306
Referees: Don Murphy, Manny Sokol

In the first NBA game played in the month of June, referees Don Murphy and Manny Sokol whistled 21 fouls in the first 10 minutes. Celtics coach Heinsohn claimed later that the affair was pure "high school." John Havlicek and Cowens put the blame on their team for committing stupid fouls.""

The game was close to the end, when Ricky Sobers hit a bank shot to put the Suns up by four with 90 seconds left. The Celtics cut it to two and had a chance to tie it, but lost 109-107 when Jo Jo White missed a jump shot late.

=== Game 5 ===
CBS

June 4

Phoenix Suns 126, Boston Celtics 128 (3OT)
Scoring by quarter: 18–36, 27–25, 27–16, 23–18, Overtime: 6–6, 11–11, 14–16
Pts: Sobers, Westphal 25 each Rebs: Curtis Perry 15; Asts: Perry, Sobers 6 each	Pts: Jo Jo White 33; Rebs: Dave Cowens 19; Asts: Jo Jo White 9

Boston Garden, Boston, Massachusetts
Attendance: 15,320
Referees: Richie Powers, Don Murphy

Game 5 was a triple-overtime contest that is sometimes referred to as "the greatest game ever played" in NBA history. The Celtics surged out to a 36–18 lead after one quarter and led 42–20 early in the second, with John Havlicek (starting for the first time all series) scoring 19 of his team's points. The halftime lead was 61–45 Celtics, but the Suns began to claw back and held Havlicek scoreless until near the end of regulation.

The game was enhanced by several controversies. Two controversies involved each team's use of timeouts:

1. With the score tied at 95–95, Boston's Paul Silas attempted to call a timeout near the end of regulation with the Celtics out of timeouts. Referee Richie Powers appeared to have seen Silas signal the timeout, but did not grant it. If he had, the Celtics would have been assessed a technical foul, and the Suns would have been awarded a free throw that might have decided the outcome.
2. The Suns' Paul Westphal also intentionally called a timeout even though his team had no more remaining, as further explained below.

Another set of controversies involved the clock:

1. Shortly after hitting the game-tying free-throw with 19 seconds left in regulation, John Havlicek missed the second and rebounded his own miss. He passed to Jo Jo White and then frantically waved for the ball back. He then dribbled to the right, passed down low to Cowens, took a return pass and uncharacteristically attempted a jump shot with eight seconds left (rather than waiting until the final seconds). Westphal rebounded the ball for Phoenix with five seconds left and signaled for a timeout which the referee granted, but the clock was not stopped until three seconds were left.
2. With three seconds left in the first overtime and the score 101–101, John Havlicek took an inbounds pass and dribbled to the right baseline before attempting a game-winning shot. The clock appeared not to start until Havlicek stopped dribbling and ball-faked before he released the shot.
3. Havlicek hit what appeared to be the game-winning shot at the end of the second overtime, but his shot went through the basket with two seconds left and the clock should have been stopped, as discussed below.

The most notable portion of the game was the final 20 seconds of the second overtime. Boston led at that point 109–106 (with the three-point basket not yet in existence). Phoenix had possession of the ball after taking its last timeout of the OT. In an amazing and frantic sequence, the following transpired:

1. The Suns' Dick Van Arsdale hit a short jumper from the corner, cutting the gap to 109–108.
2. The Celtics inbounded the ball to John Havlicek, but the Suns' Paul Westphal came from seemingly out of nowhere to knock the ball out of Havlicek's hands. As his momentum was carrying him out of bounds, Westphal saved the ball to Van Arsdale, who passed it to Curtis Perry. Perry took an 18-foot (5.5 m) shot from the left wing and missed.
3. Havlicek went after the rebound on the Perry miss, but could not get a grip on it and ended up tapping the ball back to Perry on the left baseline.
4. Perry then let fly from 15 feet (4.6 m) and made the shot to put the Suns ahead.

Phoenix suddenly led, 110–109, with just five seconds left, and the team looked poised to win their third straight game and grab a 3-to-2 edge in the series. John Havlicek (already of "Havlicek Stole the Ball" fame) responded with a drive and a leaning one-hander in traffic, that he banked in off the glass (his first basket since the first quarter), putting Boston in front 111–110 as the horn sounded. The fans then poured onto the court to celebrate Boston's apparent victory. The Celtics returned to their locker room. According to CBS guest analyst and Golden State Warriors forward Rick Barry, the ball went through the hoop with two seconds left and the clock should have been stopped. The officials apparently felt the same, and ordered the Celtics back onto the floor, continuing the game.

During the ensuing pandemonium, a fan attacked referee Richie Powers and other fans turned over one of the scorer's tables. After clearing the court (the fan who attacked Powers was arrested and the fans who overturned the scorer's table were ejected) and getting the Celtics back on the floor, the officials put one second back on the clock. Still, Phoenix's chances seemed slim, as they had the ball under their own basket with a second left. Then Paul Westphal of the Suns signaled for a time out that the Suns did not have. Although this resulted in a technical foul being called on Westphal, the play was critical for Phoenix, because the rules at the time gave Phoenix the same advantage (save for the technical foul shot) that they would have had with timeouts remaining to use; namely, possession of the ball at half court. Boston's Jo Jo White made the technical free throw, increasing Boston's lead to 112–110.

During the timeout, fans were still on the Boston Garden floor, even disturbing the Suns' huddle by their bench as coach John MacLeod was drawing up a play for a possible tying basket. The Suns' players repeatedly had to shove the fans out of the way, and Phoenix general manager Jerry Colangelo even threatened to not bring his team back to the Boston Garden for Game 7 if security couldn't maintain control. When play resumed, Phoenix's Gar Heard took the inbounds pass from Perry and made a buzzer-beating shot (a turn-around jumper at the top of the key) for the Suns that tied the score yet again, 112–112.

Boston eventually took a six-point lead, 128–122, late in the third overtime, as Glenn McDonald, a little-used Celtic reserve player, chipped in half a dozen. Westphal then scored the next four points for Phoenix (as part of a brilliant performance that featured several leaping, spinning, acrobatic bank shots) cutting the gap to 128–126, but he could not get the ball again; (although he very nearly did – almost stealing a pass near half court as the third overtime wound down).

Celtics who fouled out (were disqualified due to six personal fouls) were Charlie Scott in the last minute of regulation, Dave Cowens with one minute left in the second overtime, and Paul Silas in the third overtime. Alvan Adams and Dennis Awtrey both fouled out for the Suns. Silas picked up his fifth foul late in the fourth quarter but did not foul out until there was 3:23 remaining in the third overtime.

The Suns had the lead in the game on only five occasions and never led by more than two points. They held a lead of 95–94 late in the fourth quarter, held leads of 106–105 and 110–109 in the second overtime, and held leads of 116–114 and 118–116 in the third overtime.

Glenn McDonald scored eight points in the game, all in overtime. Jo Jo White led all scorers with 33 points.

=== Game 6 ===
June 6

Boxscore

Boston Celtics 87, Phoenix Suns 80
Scoring by quarter: 20–20, 18–13, 19–23, 30–24
Pts: Charlie Scott 25; Rebs: Dave Cowens 17; Asts: Jo Jo White 6	Pts: Alvan Adams 20; Rebs: Gar Heard 10; Asts: Alvan Adams 6
Boston wins series, 4–2

Arizona Veterans Memorial Coliseum, Phoenix, Arizona
Attendance: 13,306
Referees: Darell Garretson, Jake O'Donnell

After the tough Game 5 loss, the Suns were more defiant heading home to Phoenix. "We know we're going to beat them." Gar Heard declared. "It's going to take seven now, but we know we're going to beat them. We showed we came to play."

The first half was a defensive struggle. Tied after the first quarter at 20 points each, Boston scored 18 in the second quarter while holding the Suns to 13. Suns reserve Keith Erickson attempted to play at the start of the second quarter but reinjured his sprained ankle and never returned. After falling behind by 11, Phoenix caught up again in the third and took a 67–66 lead on a Ricky Sobers free throw with 7:25 left in the game.

But the Celtics responded and took control. Havlicek hit two free throws, then Cowens got a steal and immediately scored while drawing a foul. He made the ensuing free throw for a three-point play. Cowens then scored twice and Havlicek another to put the game away. Scott had three steals during the run and finished with 25 points and 11 rebounds, ending a series-long 11-for-44 shooting slump. During the run, Phoenix's only response was four free throws. The Celtics rode their surge to an 87–80 win and their 13th championship.

Jo Jo White scored 15 points, giving him 130 points in six games, and was named the series MVP. John Havlicek celebrated his eighth and final NBA title as a Celtic.

== Television coverage ==
The 1975–76 Finals had three straight off days between Sunday afternoon opener and Thursday night second game due to CBS's concern with low ratings for professional basketball. The 1975–76 network television season, as well as May sweeps, ended after Wednesday, May 26 and weekend afternoon games did not affect prime-time ratings. Accordingly, CBS allowed Game 1 to be played on Sunday afternoon, since the ratings would not count, but would not permit Game 2 to be played live in prime time unless the NBA waited until Thursday evening.

Game 3 started on Sunday, May 30 at 10:30 a.m. MT (1:30 p.m. ET) to allow CBS to televise the final round of the PGA Tour Memorial Tournament following the game. The move angered numerous clergy in the Phoenix area, who saw drastically reduced attendance at Sunday morning services.

== Team rosters ==
=== Boston Celtics ===
1975–76 Boston Celtics roster
Players

Pos.	No.	Player	Height	Weight	DOB	From
G	42	Jerome Anderson	6 ft 5 in (1.96 m)	195 lb (88 kg)	1953-10-09	West Virginia
C	34	Jim Ard	6 ft 8 in (2.03 m)	215 lb (98 kg)	1948-09-19	Cincinnati
F	31	Tom Boswell	6 ft 9 in (2.06 m)	220 lb (100 kg)	1953-10-02	South Carolina
C	18	Dave Cowens	6 ft 9 in (2.06 m)	230 lb (104 kg)	1948-10-25	Florida State
F	17	John Havlicek	6 ft 5 in (1.96 m)	203 lb (92 kg)	1940-04-08	Ohio State
F	33	Steve Kuberski	6 ft 8 in (2.03 m)	215 lb (98 kg)	1947-11-06	Bradley
F	30	Glenn McDonald	6 ft 6 in (1.98 m)	190 lb (86 kg)	1952-03-18	Long Beach State
F	19	Don Nelson	6 ft 6 in (1.98 m)	210 lb (95 kg)	1940-05-15	Iowa
G	11	Charlie Scott	6 ft 5 in (1.96 m)	175 lb (79 kg)	1948-12-15	North Carolina
F	32	Ed Searcy	6 ft 6 in (1.98 m)	210 lb (95 kg)	1952-04-17	St. John's
F	35	Paul Silas	6 ft 7 in (2.01 m)	220 lb (100 kg)	1943-07-12	Creighton
G	27	Kevin Stacom	6 ft 3 in (1.91 m)	185 lb (84 kg)	1951-09-04	Providence
G	10	Jo Jo White	6 ft 3 in (1.91 m)	190 lb (86 kg)	1946-11-16	Kansas

Coaches
Head coach
- Tom Heinsohn
Assistant(s)
- John Killilea

Legend
- (DP) Unsigned draft pick
- (FA) Free agent
- (S) Suspended
- Injured

Roster

=== Phoenix Suns ===
1975–76 Phoenix Suns roster
Players

Pos.	No.	Player	Height	Weight	DOB	From
F/C	33	(United States)	Alvan Adams	6 ft 9 in (2.06 m)	210 lb (95 kg)	1954-07-19	Oklahoma
C	21	(United States)	Dennis Awtrey	6 ft 10 in (2.08 m)	235 lb (107 kg)	1948-02-22	Santa Clara
G/F	14	(United States)	Keith Erickson	6 ft 5 in (1.96 m)	195 lb (88 kg)	1944-04-19	UCLA
G/F	32	(United States)	Nate Hawthorne	6 ft 4 in (1.93 m)	190 lb (86 kg)	1950-01-15	Southern Illinois
F	24	(United States)	Garfield Heard	6 ft 6 in (1.98 m)	219 lb (99 kg)	1948-05-03	Oklahoma
G	10	(United States)	Phil Lumpkin	6 ft 0 in (1.83 m)	165 lb (75 kg)	1951-12-20	Miami (OH)
F	18	(United States)	Curtis Perry	6 ft 7 in (2.01 m)	220 lb (100 kg)	1948-09-13	Missouri State
G	12	(United States)	Pat Riley	6 ft 4 in (1.93 m)	205 lb (93 kg)	1945-03-20	Kentucky
G	40	(United States)	Ricky Sobers	6 ft 3 in (1.91 m)	198 lb (90 kg)	1953-01-15	UNLV
G/F	5	(United States)	Dick Van Arsdale	6 ft 5 in (1.96 m)	210 lb (95 kg)	1943-02-22	Indiana
G	44	(United States)	Paul Westphal	6 ft 4 in (1.93 m)	195 lb (88 kg)	1950-11-30	USC
G/F	25	(United States)	John Wetzel	6 ft 5 in (1.96 m)	190 lb (86 kg)	1944-10-20	Virginia Tech

Coaches
Head coach
- (United States) John MacLeod (Bellarmine)
Assistant(s)
- (United States) Al Bianchi (Bowling Green)

Legend
- (DP) Unsigned draft pick
- (FA) Free agent
- (S) Suspended
- Injured

== Aftermath ==
=== Celtics ===
The championship was the 13th won by the Celtics, and they kept the original Walter A. Brown trophy through the 1976–77 season. During the season, the NBA commissioned a new championship trophy, later to be renamed the Larry O'Brien Championship Trophy, in which the winning team would keep the trophy permanently.

Unfortunately, the Celtics were unable to successfully defend their championship, losing in the Eastern Conference semifinals to the eventual conference champion Philadelphia 76ers in seven games. After that, the team began to rebuild, losing John Havlicek to retirement and then Jo Jo White to a trade within two years. Despite drafting Larry Bird in the 1978 NBA draft, Bird elected to play out his final season in college while the Celtics lost 53 games in the 1978–79 season. With Bird debuting for the 1979–80 season, the Celtics won 32 more games, but it was not until 1981 that they won another championship, which came against the Houston Rockets in six games.

=== Suns ===
The Suns followed their unexpected run to the Finals with a losing season in 1976–77, going 34–48. After the season, Dick Van Arsdale and twin brother Tom van Ardsdale, who became his teammate for that season, retired. Pat Riley, who did not play in the finals, also retired as a player after the season and went on to win six NBA championships as a head coach. However, the Suns would make the playoffs the next eight seasons, going as far as the conference finals in the 1979 and 1984.

Alvan Adams remained with the Suns for the next twelve seasons, retiring after 1987–88. Paul Westphal played five more seasons in Phoenix, in two different stints, before becoming the Suns’ head coach. Westphal would coach the Suns to the 1993 NBA Finals, when they fell to the Michael Jordan-led Chicago Bulls in six games, becoming the last victim of the first Bulls three-peat from 1991 to 1993. They would also make the Finals in 2021, but they would lose to the Milwaukee Bucks, also in six games.

== See also ==
- 1976 NBA playoffs
- 1975–76 NBA season
