= 1975–76 Phoenix Suns season =

Professional basketball season

- Conference champions
- Head coach: John MacLeod
- General manager: Jerry Colangelo
- Owners: Karl Eller, Don Pitt, Don Diamond, Bhavik Darji, Marvin Meyer, Richard L. Bloch
- Arena: Arizona Veterans Memorial Coliseum

Results
- Record: 42–40 (.512)
- Place: Division: 3rd (Pacific); Conference: 4th (Western)
- Playoff finish: NBA Finals (lost to Celtics 2–4)
- Stats at Basketball Reference

Local media
- Television: KTAR-TV
- Radio: KTAR

The 1975–76 Phoenix Suns season was the eighth season for the Phoenix Suns of the National Basketball Association. The season included an improbable run to the NBA Finals by a team that had never won a playoff series and made the playoffs only one other season in the franchise's existence.

With a regular season record of 42–40, the Suns had finished third in the Pacific division standings and improved upon last season's win total by 10 games. The ensuing playoff run took plenty by surprise, including a seven-game series win against the Western Conference's top seed and defending NBA champion Golden State Warriors, a team that had finished 17 games ahead of the Suns in the divisional standings.

The franchise's first Finals appearance was played against a 12-time champion in the Boston Celtics, whose roster featured three players from that season's All-Star Game. The 1976 NBA Finals included Game 5, which required a triple-overtime in which the Suns narrowly lost. The Suns then lost Game 6 and the series.

The team's "Cinderella" season earned them the nickname Sunderella Suns. John MacLeod was head coach and the Suns played their home games at Arizona Veterans Memorial Coliseum.

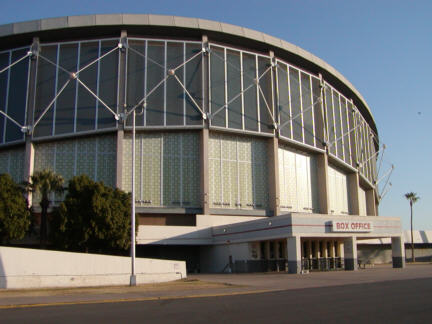
Arizona Veterans Memorial Coliseum

== Offseason ==
=== NBA draft ===
Round	Pick	Player	Position	Nationality	College
1	4	Alvan Adams	Center	United States	Oklahoma
1	16	Ricky Sobers	Guard	United States	UNLV
2	35	Allen Murphy	Guard	United States	Louisville
2	36	Jimmy Dan Conner	Guard	United States	Kentucky
3	54	Bayard Forrest	Center	United States	Grand Canyon
4	58	Sam McCants	Guard	United States	Oral Roberts
5	76	Joe Pace	Center	United States	Coppin State
6	94	Clark "Biff" Burrell	Guard	United States	USC
7	112	Dave Edmunds	Guard	United States	West Georgia
8	130	Jack Schrader	Forward	United States	Arizona State
9	147	Owen Brown	Forward	United States	Maryland
10	163	Mike Moon	Guard	United States	Arizona State

Finishing the previous season with a 32–50 record, the Suns earned the fourth pick in the draft, which they used to select center Alvan Adams from Oklahoma. Adams averaged 23.4 points and 12.8 rebounds per game in three seasons with the Sooners. With averages of 19 points, 9.1 rebounds, 5.6 assists, 1.5 steals, and 1.5 blocks a game, Adams would become an All-Star in his first NBA season, and go on to be named Rookie of the Year. Adams would spend his entire 13-year career with the Suns, and would have his #33 jersey retired by the franchise in 1988.

On draft day, the Suns traded one of their 1976 first-round picks (acquired from a trade with the New Orleans Jazz in 1974) to the Buffalo Braves for the 16th pick in the 1975 draft. The Suns used their additional pick to select guard Ricky Sobers from UNLV. In 1976, the Braves would use the sixth pick to select future Hall of Famer Adrian Dantley. Sobers would play two seasons for the Suns, contributing significantly to their Finals run, before being traded to the Indiana Pacers for Don Buse.

In the third round, the Suns selected center Bayard Forrest from Grand Canyon University. Forrest would play another season with the Antelopes, and be drafted again by the Seattle SuperSonics in 1976. The Sonics would trade the rights to Forrest back to the Suns in 1977 for a 1979 second-round pick. Forrest played two seasons for the Suns as a backup center, before being sidelined by thyroid cancer, forcing him to retire in 1980.

=== Free agency ===
On June 10, the Suns signed free agent point guard Dennis "Mo" Layton. Layton began his career with the Suns in 1971, playing two seasons before being waived. He would then play for the Portland Trail Blazers and the Memphis Tams of the ABA in 1973–74, and sit for the 1974–75 season as a free agent. Layton was waived by the Suns during the preseason and would again sit through 1975–76 season as a free agent.

On October 24, the Suns claimed veteran swingman John Wetzel off of waivers from the Atlanta Hawks. Wetzel would play sparingly throughout the season, averaging 6.7 minutes in 37 regular season games, and 2.5 minutes in two playoff games. Wetzel had played for the Suns from 1970 to 1972, and would spend his final season with the Suns before retiring in August 1976. Wetzel would later become an assistant coach with the Suns from 1979 to 1987, before becoming the team's head coach for the 1987–88 season.

=== Trades ===
On May 23, the Suns traded three-time All-Star guard Charlie Scott to the Boston Celtics for guard Paul Westphal, a 1975 second-round draft pick, and a 1976 second-round draft pick. Suns general manager Jerry Colangelo released this statement after the trade:

It takes a team concept of play to win in this league. Although Charlie Scott is a talent, our decision was made on the basis that Scott's talents were of an individual nature and did not fit into a team style of play. In Paul Westphal, we are acquiring a player from a winning situation. He is a stable, quality individual who will add leadership and experience to our club. We are confident that this decision will prove to be a major step in developing a winner and that the Phoenix Suns are more important than any one individual.

— Jerry Colangelo,

Westphal had spent his first three years playing a limited role for Boston, but would blossom as a starter for the Suns. From 1976–77 to 1979–80, Westphal would make four consecutive All-Star appearances, voted as a starter three times, and be named to four All-NBA Teams, including three First Team selections. Scott's minutes and points would decrease with the Celtics, and he would not again be selected as an All-Star. Later, Westphal would join the Suns for a second stint during the 1983-84 NBA season, his last in the NBA as a player. Westphal would then pursue a coaching career eventually joining the Suns as an assistant coach in 1988 under Cotton Fitzsimmons and would succeed him as head coach in 1992 and coach the Suns to their second Finals appearance.

On May 28, the Suns traded center Earl Williams to the Detroit Pistons for forward Willie Norwood. Unable to play in training camp due to knee injuries, the Suns exercised a contract clause that allowed them to send Norwood back to the Pistons. On September 30, the Pistons would send the Suns a 1976 second-round draft pick as compensation for Williams.

On June 9, the Suns traded a 1976 second-round draft pick to the Portland Trail Blazers for guard Phil Lumpkin. Playing the 1975–76 season as a backup point guard, Lumpkin would average 2.1 points and 1.4 assists in 34 regular season games, and 1.8 points and 1.2 assists in 17 playoff games. Lumpkin was waived prior to the 1976–77 season and would not play in the NBA again.

On September 17, the Suns traded guard Greg Jackson to the Washington Bullets for future draft considerations. Jackson was waived by the Bullets a month later and did not play in the NBA again.

== Roster ==
1975–76 Phoenix Suns roster
Players

Pos.	No.	Player	Height	Weight	DOB	From
F/C	33	Alvan Adams	6 ft 9 in (2.06 m)	210 lb (95 kg)	1954-07-19	Oklahoma
C	21	Dennis Awtrey	6 ft 10 in (2.08 m)	235 lb (107 kg)	1948-02-22	Santa Clara
G/F	14	Keith Erickson	6 ft 5 in (1.96 m)	195 lb (88 kg)	1944-04-19	UCLA
SG	32	Nate Hawthorne	6 ft 4 in (1.93 m)	190 lb (86 kg)	1950-01-15	Southern Illinois
F	24	Garfield Heard	6 ft 6 in (1.98 m)	219 lb (99 kg)	1948-05-03	Oklahoma
PG	10	Phil Lumpkin	6 ft 0 in (1.83 m)	165 lb (75 kg)	1951-12-20	Miami (OH)
F/C	18	Curtis Perry	6 ft 7 in (2.01 m)	220 lb (100 kg)	1948-09-13	Missouri State
G/F	12	Pat Riley	6 ft 4 in (1.93 m)	205 lb (93 kg)	1945-03-20	Kentucky
G	40	Ricky Sobers	6 ft 3 in (1.91 m)	198 lb (90 kg)	1953-01-15	UNLV
SG	5	Dick Van Arsdale	6 ft 5 in (1.96 m)	210 lb (95 kg)	1943-02-22	Indiana
G	44	Paul Westphal	6 ft 4 in (1.93 m)	195 lb (88 kg)	1950-11-30	USC
G/F	25	John Wetzel	6 ft 5 in (1.96 m)	190 lb (86 kg)	1944-10-20	Virginia Tech

Coaches
Head coach
- (United States) John MacLeod (Bellarmine)
Assistant(s)
- (United States) Al Bianchi (Bowling Green)

Legend
- (DP) Unsigned draft pick
- (FA) Free agent
- (S) Suspended
- Injured

== Preseason ==
The Suns held their training camp from September 25 to October 5 at the Yavapai College Gymnasium in Prescott, Arizona. The initial training camp roster consisted of returning Suns Dennis Awtrey, Mike Bantom, Keith Erickson, Nate Hawthorne, Gary Melchionni, Curtis Perry, Fred Saunders and Dick Van Arsdale, as well as newly acquired players Mo Layton, Phil Lumpkin, Willie Norwood and Paul Westphal, rookies Alvan Adams, John Shumate and Ricky Sobers, and training camp invitee Duane Read. Norwood, acquired in an earlier trade with the Detroit Pistons, was unable to play due to knee problems and sent back to the Pistons on October 30. Layton was waived on October 2 after appearing in one exhibition game. Read, a free agent guard from Portland State, had impressed the Suns staff during Los Angeles summer league play and was invited to training camp. Read started in the Suns first preseason game but was cut from the roster before the season. Melchionni was waived on October 24, one day prior to the start of the regular season. Melchionni had played with the Suns for the last two years as a backup point guard, averaging 7.8 points, 2.4 rebounds and 2.2 assists in 137 games.

The loss of Norwood and injuries to Awtrey, Lumpkin, Melchionni and Saunders cut the team's initial preseason roster down to 11. Even with an abbreviated roster, the Suns finished the preseason with a 5–1 record, including three wins over the rival Los Angeles Lakers, a win over the Seattle SuperSonics, and a win over the Kansas City Kings. Their one loss came at the hands of the Kings, who beat the Suns 105–109 in overtime to close the preseason. Westphal led the Suns with 21.2 points a game in exhibition play, while Adams averaged 15.3 points and a team high 6.2 assists a game. Not included in the Suns preseason record was an exhibition game against the United States Pan American team on October 6 at Arizona Veterans Memorial Coliseum. The collegiate squad, who would go on to win the gold medal at the 1975 Pan American Games, narrowly defeated the Suns 72–70 off a last second layup from future NBA champion Johnny Davis.

=== Game log ===
1975 preseason game log
October: 5–1

Game	Date	Team	Score	High points	Location Attendance	Record	Streak
1	October 1	Los Angeles	W 114–112	Alvan Adams (24)	Robertson Gymnasium	1–0	W 1
2	October 8	Los Angeles	W 111–106	Alvan Adams (17)	Bakersfield, CA	2–0	W 2
3	October 11	Los Angeles	W 104–94	Paul Westphal (26)	Arizona Veterans Memorial Coliseum	3–0	W 3
4	October 12	Seattle	W 104–92	Paul Westphal (32)	Ellensburg, WA	4–0	W 4
5	October 18	Kansas City	W 101–90			5–0	W 5
6	November 8	Kansas City	L 105–109 (OT)	Paul Westphal (17)	Las Vegas, NV	5–1	L 1

== Regular season ==
=== Standings ===
Pacific Division	W	L	PCT	GB	Home	Road	Div
y-Golden State Warriors	59	23	.720	–	36–5	23–18	17–9
x-Seattle SuperSonics	43	39	.524	16	31–10	12–29	12–14
x-Phoenix Suns	42	40	.512	17	27–14	15–26	15–11
Los Angeles Lakers	40	42	.488	19	31–11	9–31	10–16
Portland Trail Blazers	37	45	.451	22	25–15	12–30	11–15

#	Western Conference				
#	Team	W	L	PCT	GB
1	z-Golden State Warriors	59	23	.720	–
2	x-Seattle SuperSonics	43	39	.524	16
3	x-Phoenix Suns	42	40	.512	17
4	y-Milwaukee Bucks	38	44	.463	21
5	x-Detroit Pistons	36	46	.439	23
6	Los Angeles Lakers	40	42	.488	19
7	Portland Trail Blazers	37	45	.451	22
8	Kansas City Kings	31	51	.378	28
9	Chicago Bulls	24	58	.293	35

=== Game log ===
1975–76 game log
Total: 42–40 (home: 27–14; road: 15–26)
October: 1–1 (home: 0–0; road: 1–1)

Game	Date	Team	Score	High points	Location Attendance	Record	Streak
1	October 25	@ Portland	W 89–88	Paul Westphal (17)	Memorial Coliseum; 11,274	1–0	W 1
2	October 26	@ Seattle	L 99–113	Alvan Adams (29)	Seattle Center Coliseum; 13,288	1–1	L 1

November: 6–6 (home: 5–1; road: 1–5)

Game	Date	Team	Score	High points	Location Attendance	Record	Streak
3	November 1	@ Kansas City	L 100–106	Paul Westphal (22)	Kemper Arena; 6,632	1–2	L 2
4	November 4	@ Chicago	W 96–80	Alvan Adams (18)	Chicago Stadium; 5,216	2–2	W 1
5	November 7	@ Philadelphia	L 99–103	Curtis Perry (21)	The Spectrum; 9,549	2–3	L 1
6	November 8	@ Buffalo	L 105–110	Paul Westphal (29)	Buffalo Memorial Auditorium; 10,253	2–4	L 2
7	November 11	New York	W 112–81	Paul Westphal (21)	Arizona Veterans Memorial Coliseum; 8,576	3–4	W 1
8	November 13	Seattle	W 106–103	Dick Van Arsdale (20)	Arizona Veterans Memorial Coliseum; 5,016	4–4	W 2
9	November 14	@ Los Angeles	L 107–114	Alvan Adams (35)	The Forum; 11,450	4–5	L 1
10	November 19	Milwaukee	L 94–96	Dick Van Arsdale (18)	Arizona Veterans Memorial Coliseum; 5,582	4–6	L 2
11	November 21	Houston	W 107–92	Paul Westphal (22)	Arizona Veterans Memorial Coliseum; 6,230	5–6	W 1
12	November 26	Buffalo	W 107–106	John Shumate (25)	Arizona Veterans Memorial Coliseum; 8,157	6–6	W 2
13	November 28	Portland	W 110–101	Paul Westphal (21)	Arizona Veterans Memorial Coliseum; 7,769	7–6	W 3
14	November 29	@ Golden State	L 100–112	Paul Westphal (27)	Oakland–Alameda County Coliseum Arena; 12,787	7–7	L 1

December: 8–7 (home: 5–5; road: 3–2)

Game	Date	Team	Score	High points	Location Attendance	Record	Streak
15	December 2	Golden State	W 115–98	Alvan Adams (23)	Arizona Veterans Memorial Coliseum; 5,179	8–7	W 1
16	December 5	Washington	L 87–92	Alvan Adams (17)	Arizona Veterans Memorial Coliseum; 8,065	8–8	L 1
17	December 7	Chicago	W 114–97	Dick Van Arsdale (23)	Arizona Veterans Memorial Coliseum; 4,383	9–8	W 1
18	December 9	@ New Orleans	W 104–89	Dick Van Arsdale (25)	Louisiana Superdome; 7,619	10–8	W 2
19	December 10	@ Houston	W 105–91	Paul Westphal (32)	The Summit; 5,358	11–8	W 3
20	December 11	Philadelphia	L 106–110	Alvan Adams (21)	Arizona Veterans Memorial Coliseum; 6,310	11–9	L 1
21	December 13	Los Angeles	W 116–108	Paul Westphal (26)	Arizona Veterans Memorial Coliseum; 7,842	12–9	W 1
22	December 14	@ Portland	W 105–96	Alvan Adams (20)	Memorial Coliseum; 10,544	13–9	W 2
23	December 17	Milwaukee	W 116–111	Alvan Adams, Keith Erickson (25)	Arizona Veterans Memorial Coliseum; 5,689	14–9	W 3
24	December 19	Cleveland	L 124–128 (2OT)	Keith Erickson, Dick Van Arsdale (26)	Arizona Veterans Memorial Coliseum; 6,809	14–10	L 1
25	December 21	New Orleans	L 107–120	John Shumate (18)	Arizona Veterans Memorial Coliseum; 6,853	14–11	L 2
26	December 25	Kansas City	W 122–111	Curtis Perry (27)	Arizona Veterans Memorial Coliseum; 11,114	15–11	W 1
27	December 26	Boston	L 106–112	Paul Westphal (22)	Arizona Veterans Memorial Coliseum; 11,842	15–12	L 1
28	December 28	@ Milwaukee	L 85–88	Keith Erickson (22)	MECCA Arena; 10,938	15–13	L 2
29	December 30	@ New York	L 88–114	John Shumate (21)	Madison Square Garden; 16,064	15–14	L 3

January: 4–13 (home: 2–6; road: 2–7)

Game	Date	Team	Score	High points	Location Attendance	Record	Streak
30	January 1	@ Washington	L 103–114	Paul Westphal (25)	Capital Centre; 4,919	15–15	L 4
31	January 3	@ Atlanta	W 100–89	Dick Van Arsdale (18)	Omni Coliseum; 5,803	16–15	W 1
32	January 4	@ Kansas City	L 86–98	Keith Erickson (17)	Kemper Arena; 5,040	16–16	L 1
33	January 7	Golden State	L 110–114	Paul Westphal (23)	Arizona Veterans Memorial Coliseum; 6,696	16–17	L 2
34	January 8	@ Golden State	L 113–129	Keith Erickson (25)	Oakland–Alameda County Coliseum Arena; 9,807	16–18	L 3
35	January 9	Seattle	L 110–112 (OT)	Alvan Adams (29)	Arizona Veterans Memorial Coliseum; 5,774	16–19	L 4
36	January 11	New York	L 98–99	Keith Erickson (21)	Arizona Veterans Memorial Coliseum; 6,429	16–20	L 5
37	January 15	Buffalo	L 119–126	John Shumate (25)	Arizona Veterans Memorial Coliseum; 6,138	16–21	L 6
38	January 17	@ Cleveland	L 85–105	Alvan Adams (18)	Coliseum at Richfield; 8,082	16–22	L 7
39	January 18	@ Detroit	W 122–118	John Shumate (28)	Cobo Arena; 3,054	17–22	W 1
40	January 20	@ Buffalo	L 103–112	Paul Westphal (27)	Buffalo Memorial Auditorium; 8,478	17–23	L 1
41	January 21	@ Boston	L 100–114	Alvan Adams (23)	Boston Garden; 11,562	17–24	L 2
42	January 23	Houston	W 124–115	Paul Westphal (28)	Arizona Veterans Memorial Coliseum; 6,341	18–24	W 1
43	January 24	Washington	L 84–100	Alvan Adams, Paul Westphal (16)	Arizona Veterans Memorial Coliseum; 7,263	18–25	L 1
44	January 28	@ Los Angeles	L 118–121	Paul Westphal (30)	The Forum; 11,735	18–26	L 2
45	January 29	Milwaukee	L 96–105	Paul Westphal (29)	Arizona Veterans Memorial Coliseum; 7,125	18–27	L 3
46	January 31	Philadelphia	W 119–105	Alvan Adams (30)	Arizona Veterans Memorial Coliseum; 8,134	19–27	W 1

February: 8–5 (home: 4–2; road: 4–3)

Game	Date	Team	Score	High points	Location Attendance	Record	Streak
All-Star Break
47	February 6	Golden State	W 118–111	Alvan Adams (33)	Arizona Veterans Memorial Coliseum; 7,187	20–27	W 1
48	February 8	@ Seattle	W 107–101 (OT)	Nate Hawthorne (25)	Seattle Center Coliseum; 13,039	21–27	W 2
49	February 11	Detroit	W 123–94	Alvan Adams (22)	Arizona Veterans Memorial Coliseum; 5,718	22–27	W 3
50	February 13	Boston	L 108–109	Paul Westphal (31)	Arizona Veterans Memorial Coliseum; 8,130	22–28	L 1
51	February 14	New Orleans	W 112–93	Alvan Adams (25)	Arizona Veterans Memorial Coliseum; 6,539	23–28	W 1
52	February 17	@ Chicago	L 111–114 (OT)	Alvan Adams (32)	Chicago Stadium; 4,313	23–29	L 1
53	February 18	@ Detroit	L 94–105	Paul Westphal (22)	Cobo Arena; 3,045	23–30	L 2
54	February 20	@ New Orleans	W 103–102	Alvan Adams (28)	Louisiana Superdome; 10,519	24–30	W 1
55	February 21	@ Houston	W 110–108 (OT)	Alvan Adams, Paul Westphal (24)	The Summit; 6,043	25–30	W 2
56	February 24	Kansas City	L 117–120 (OT)	Alvan Adams (30)	Arizona Veterans Memorial Coliseum; 6,416	25–31	L 1
57	February 26	Atlanta	W 115–97	Ricky Sobers, Paul Westphal (27)	Arizona Veterans Memorial Coliseum; 5,820	26–31	W 1
58	February 28	@ Washington	L 89–92	Paul Westphal (23)	Capital Centre; 9,245	26–32	L 1
59	February 29	@ Detroit	W 109–98	Paul Westphal (32)	Cobo Arena; 6,143	27–32	W 1

March: 12–5 (home: 8–0; road: 4–5)

Game	Date	Team	Score	High points	Location Attendance	Record	Streak
60	March 3	Cleveland	W 108–92	Paul Westphal (31)	Arizona Veterans Memorial Coliseum; 4,523	28–32	W 2
61	March 5	Chicago	W 99–97	Alvan Adams, Paul Westphal (22)	Arizona Veterans Memorial Coliseum; 5,346	29–32	W 3
62	March 6	@ Portland	L 99–118	Nate Hawthorne (19)	Memorial Coliseum; 9,142	29–33	L 1
63	March 7	Portland	W 106–84	Paul Westphal (30)	Arizona Veterans Memorial Coliseum; 5,039	30–33	W 1
64	March 10	@ Philadelphia	L 108–125	Alvan Adams (24)	The Spectrum; 10,061	30–34	L 1
65	March 11	@ Atlanta	W 104–99	Paul Westphal (32)	Omni Coliseum; 4,137	31–34	W 1
66	March 13	@ Cleveland	L 77–99	Curtis Perry (14)	Coliseum at Richfield; 17,592	31–35	L 1
67	March 14	@ Milwaukee	W 108–106	Alvan Adams (25)	MECCA Arena; 10,938	32–35	W 1
68	March 16	@ Chicago	L 87–120	Alvan Adams (15)	Chicago Stadium; 3,392	32–36	L 1
69	March 18	Detroit	W 106–100	Gar Heard (27)	Arizona Veterans Memorial Coliseum; 5,687	33–36	W 1
70	March 20	Los Angeles	W 106–93	Alvan Adams (29)	Arizona Veterans Memorial Coliseum; 9,123	34–36	W 2
71	March 23	Seattle	W 104–97	Paul Westphal (39)	Arizona Veterans Memorial Coliseum; 7,589	35–36	W 3
72	March 25	Atlanta	W 107–98	Paul Westphal (27)	Arizona Veterans Memorial Coliseum; 6,257	36–36	W 4
73	March 27	Kansas City	W 117–110	Paul Westphal (27)	Arizona Veterans Memorial Coliseum; 9,386	37–36	W 5
74	March 28	@ Los Angeles	W 100–97	Paul Westphal (27)	The Forum; 11,732	38–36	W 6
75	March 30	@ New York	W 113–97	Paul Westphal (29)	Madison Square Garden; 13,494	39–36	W 7
76	March 31	@ Boston	L 102–122	Nate Hawthorne (22)	Boston Garden; 8,200	39–37	L 1

April: 3–3 (home: 3–0; road: 0–3)

Game	Date	Team	Score	High points	Location Attendance	Record	Streak
77	April 2	Portland	W 106–103	Alvan Adams (20)	Arizona Veterans Memorial Coliseum; 10,424	40–37	W 1
78	April 3	@ Portland	L 97–112	Paul Westphal (28)	Memorial Coliseum; 9,010	40–38	L 1
79	April 4	@ Seattle	L 89–117	Alvan Adams (21)	Seattle Center Coliseum; 14,096	40–39	L 2
80	April 6	@ Golden State	L 106–111 (OT)	Alvan Adams (30)	Oakland–Alameda County Coliseum Arena; 11,809	40–40	L 3
81	April 8	Los Angeles	W 113–98	Ricky Sobers (23)	Arizona Veterans Memorial Coliseum; 13,036	41–40	W 1
82	April 10	Seattle	W 121–95	Alvan Adams (19)	Arizona Veterans Memorial Coliseum; 9,577	42–40	W 2

1975–76 schedule

== Playoffs ==
=== Game log ===
1976 playoff game log
Conference semifinals: 4–2 (home: 3–0; road: 1–2)

Game	Date	Team	Score	High points	High rebounds	High assists	Location Attendance	Series
1	April 13	@ Seattle	L 99–102	Paul Westphal (24)	Gar Heard (10)	Paul Westphal (10)	Seattle Center Coliseum; 12,408	0–1
2	April 15	@ Seattle	W 116–111	Alvan Adams (23)	Curtis Perry (12)	Alvan Adams (7)	Seattle Center Coliseum; 14,096	1–1
3	April 18	Seattle	W 103–91	Heard, Westphal (16)	Gar Heard (14)	Westphal, Adams (6)	Arizona Veterans Memorial Coliseum; 13,036	2–1
4	April 20	Seattle	W 130–114	Paul Westphal (39)	Gar Heard (11)	Ricky Sobers (8)	Arizona Veterans Memorial Coliseum; 13,036	3–1
5	April 25	@ Seattle	L 108–114	Paul Westphal (27)	Dennis Awtrey (12)	three players tied (4)	Seattle Center Coliseum; 14,096	3–2
6	April 27	Seattle	W 123–112	Keith Erickson (20)	Heard, Adams (9)	Alvan Adams (10)	Arizona Veterans Memorial Coliseum; 13,192	4–2

Conference finals: 4–3 (home: 2–1; road: 2–2)

Game	Date	Team	Score	High points	High rebounds	High assists	Location Attendance	Series
1	May 2	@ Golden State	L 103–128	Curtis Perry (22)	Alvan Adams (14)	Alvan Adams (6)	Oakland–Alameda County Coliseum Arena; 12,475	0–1
2	May 5	@ Golden State	W 108–101	Paul Westphal (31)	Gar Heard (12)	Alvan Adams (9)	Oakland–Alameda County Coliseum Arena; 13,067	1–1
3	May 7	Golden State	L 91–99	Paul Westphal (24)	Alvan Adams (14)	Ricky Sobers (6)	Arizona Veterans Memorial Coliseum; 13,306	1–2
4	May 9	Golden State	W 133–129 (2OT)	Keith Erickson (28)	Gar Heard (18)	Paul Westphal (8)	Arizona Veterans Memorial Coliseum; 12,884	2–2
5	May 12	@ Golden State	L 95–111	Curtis Perry (23)	Curtis Perry (18)	Westphal, Sobers (4)	Oakland–Alameda County Coliseum Arena; 13,067	2–3
6	May 14	Golden State	W 105–104	Ricky Sobers (21)	Gar Heard (15)	three players tied (6)	Arizona Veterans Memorial Coliseum; 13,396	3–3
7	May 16	@ Golden State	W 94–86	Gar Heard (21)	Alvan Adams (20)	Westphal, Perry (4)	Oakland–Alameda County Coliseum Arena; 13,067	4–3

NBA Finals: 2–4 (home: 2–1; road: 0–3)

Game	Date	Team	Score	High points	High rebounds	High assists	Location Attendance	Series
1	May 23	@ Boston	L 87–98	Alvan Adams (26)	Curtis Perry (10)	Ricky Sobers (7)	Boston Garden; 15,320	0–1
2	May 27	@ Boston	L 90–105	Paul Westphal (28)	Alvan Adams (15)	Westphal, Adams (5)	Boston Garden; 15,320	0–2
3	May 30	Boston	W 105–98	Alvan Adams (33)	Alvan Adams (14)	Paul Westphal (6)	Arizona Veterans Memorial Coliseum; 12,284	1–2
4	June 2	Boston	W 109–107	Paul Westphal (28)	Gar Heard (15)	Paul Westphal (9)	Arizona Veterans Memorial Coliseum; 13,306	2–2
5	June 4	@ Boston	L 126–128 (3OT)	Westphal, Sobers (25)	Curtis Perry (15)	Perry, Sobers (6)	Boston Garden; 15,320	2–3
6	June 6	Boston	L 80–87	Alvan Adams (20)	Gar Heard (10)	Alvan Adams (6)	Arizona Veterans Memorial Coliseum; 13,306	2–4

1976 schedule

== Awards and honors ==
=== All-Star ===
- Alvan Adams was selected as a reserve for the Western Conference in the All-Star Game. It was his first and only All-Star selection.

=== Season ===
- Alvan Adams received the Rookie of the Year Award.
- Jerry Colangelo received the Executive of the Year Award.
- Alvan Adams was named to the NBA All-Rookie First Team.
- Paul Westphal finished 24th in MVP voting.

== Player statistics ==
Legend
GP	Games played	GS	Games started	MPG	Minutes per game
FG%	Field-goal percentage	FT%	Free-throw percentage	RPG	Rebounds per game
APG	Assists per game	SPG	Steals per game	BPG	Blocks per game
PPG	Points per game

=== Season ===
Player	GP	GS	MPG	FG%	FT%	RPG	APG	SPG	BPG	PPG
Alvan Adams	80	78	33.2	.469	.735	9.1	5.6	1.5	1.5	19.0
Dennis Awtrey	74	4	18.6	.467	.688	4.0	2.1	.3	.3	4.9
Mike Bantom*	7	2	9.7	.308	1.000^	3.3	0.4	.3	.3	3.0
Keith Erickson	74	39	25.0	.470	.854^	4.5	2.5	1.1	.1	10.1
Nate Hawthorne	79	1	14.5	.430	.676	2.6	0.6	.4	.2	6.1
Garfield Heard*	36	36	33.9	.452	.673	9.9+	1.8	1.4	1.1	12.4
Phil Lumpkin	34	0	10.9	.338	.867^	0.7	1.4	.4	.0	2.1
Curtis Perry	71	70	33.1	.497†	.732	9.6+	2.6	1.2	.9	13.3
Pat Riley*	60	5	13.2	.389	.730	0.8	1.0	.4	.1	4.6
Fred Saunders	17	0	8.6	.438	.545	2.2	0.8	.3	.1	3.6
John Shumate*	43	11	21.6	.550†	.628	5.6	1.4	1.0	.4	11.3
Ricky Sobers	78	30	24.3	.449	.823	3.3	2.8	1.4	.1	9.2
Dick Van Arsdale	58	54	32.2	.484	.830	2.4	2.4	.9	.2	12.9
Paul Westphal	82	80	36.1	.494	.830	3.2	5.4	2.6	.5	20.5
John Wetzel	37	0	6.7	.478	.833	1.0	0.5	.2	.1	1.7

* – Stats with the Suns.
† – Minimum 300 field goals made.
^ – Minimum 125 free throws made.
+ – Minimum 70 games played or 800 rebounds.

=== Playoffs ===
Player	GP	GS	MPG	FG%	FT%	RPG	APG	SPG	BPG	PPG
Alvan Adams	19	19	35.2	.452	.817	10.1	5.2	1.3	1.1	17.9
Dennis Awtrey	19	0	15.1	.467	.545	3.3	1.3	.3	.5	3.2
Keith Erickson	19	0	22.4	.462	.809	3.5	1.8	.6	.2	11.3
Nate Hawthorne	15	0	5.4	.346	.727	1.1	0.3	.3	.1	1.7
Garfield Heard	19	19	37.9	.441	.679	10.4	1.7	2.1	1.9	13.9
Phil Lumpkin	17	0	8.0	.333	.786	0.8	1.2	.1	.0	1.8
Curtis Perry	19	19	32.4	.454	.647	7.7	1.9	.6	.9	12.7
Pat Riley	5	0	5.4	.400	1.000^	0.0	1.0	.0	.0	2.6
Ricky Sobers	19	19	29.6	.468	.833	3.3	4.2	.9	.3	13.0
Dick Van Arsdale	19	0	24.8	.488	.870^	1.2	2.0	.7	.1	8.5
Paul Westphal	19	19	36.1	.511	.763	2.5	5.1	1.8	.5	21.1
John Wetzel	2	0	2.5	.	1.000^	1.0	.0	.0	.0	1.0

^ – Minimum 10 free throws made.

== Transactions ==
=== Trades ===
May 23, 1975	To Boston Celtics (United States) Charlie Scott	To Phoenix Suns (United States) Paul Westphal 1975 second-round draft pick ( (United States) Jimmy Dan Conner) 1976 second-round draft pick ( (United States) Butch Feher)
May 29, 1975	To Buffalo Braves 1976 first-round draft pick ( (United States) Adrian Dantley)	To Phoenix Suns 1975 first-round draft pick ( (United States) Ricky Sobers)
June 9, 1975	To Portland Trail Blazers 1976 second-round draft pick ( (United States) Jacky Dorsey)	To Phoenix Suns (United States) Phil Lumpkin
September 17, 1975	To Washington Bullets (United States) Greg Jackson	To Phoenix Suns Future draft pick
September 30, 1975	To Detroit Pistons (United States) Earl Williams	To Phoenix Suns 1976 second-round draft pick ( (United States) Earl Tatum)
November 3, 1975	To Los Angeles Lakers (United States) John Roche 1976 second-round draft pick ( (United States) Earl Tatum)	To Phoenix Suns (United States) Pat Riley
November 22, 1975	To Seattle SuperSonics (United States) Mike Bantom	To Phoenix Suns Cash considerations
February 1, 1976	To Buffalo Braves (United States) John Shumate	To Phoenix Suns (United States) Garfield Heard 1976 second-round draft pick ( (United States) Al Fleming)

=== Free agents ===
==== Additions ====
Date	Player	Contract	Former Team
June 10, 1975	Mo Layton	Undisclosed	Memphis Tams (ABA)
October 24, 1975	John Wetzel	Undisclosed	Atlanta Hawks

==== Subtractions ====
Date	Player	Reason left	New team
July 16, 1975	Jim Owens	Waived	n/a
October 2, 1975	Mo Layton	Waived	New York Knicks
October 24, 1975	Gary Melchionni	Waived	Hazleton Bullets (EBA)
February 11, 1976	Fred Saunders	Waived	Boston Celtics
