= Alvan Adams =

American basketball player (born 1954)

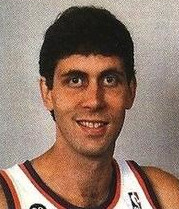
- Adams in 1987

Personal information
- Born: July 19, 1954 (age 72) Lawrence, Kansas, U.S.
- Listed height: 6 ft 9 in (2.06 m)
- Listed weight: 210 lb (95 kg)

Career information
- High school: Putnam City (Oklahoma City, Oklahoma)
- College: Oklahoma (1972–1975)
- NBA draft: 1975: 1st round, 4th overall pick
- Drafted by: Phoenix Suns
- Playing career: 1975–1988
- Position: Power forward / center
- Number: 33

Career history
- 1975–1988: Phoenix Suns

Career highlights
- NBA All-Star (1976); NBA Rookie of the Year (1976); NBA All-Rookie First Team (1976); No. 33 retired by Phoenix Suns; Third-team All-American – NABC (1975); Big Eight Player of the Year (1975); 3× First-team All-Big Eight (1973–1975); No. 33 honored by Oklahoma Sooners; Second-team Parade All-American (1972)

Career statistics
- Points: 13,910 (14.1 ppg)
- Rebounds: 6,937 (7.0 rpg)
- Assists: 4,012 (4.1 apg)
- Stats at NBA.com
- Stats at Basketball Reference
Medals
Men's basketball
Representing the United States
Universiade
Gold medal – first place	1973 Moscow	Team competition

Alvan Leigh Adams (born July 19, 1954) is an American former professional basketball player. He spent his entire 13-year career with the Phoenix Suns of the National Basketball Association (NBA). Adams was named as the NBA Rookie of the Year in 1975 and selected as an NBA All-Star in 1976. He retired in 1988 and holds Suns records for games played (988), minutes played (27,203), rebounds (6,937) and steals (1,289). Raised in Oklahoma City, Adams was nicknamed the "Oklahoma Kid".

== Early life ==
Adams was born in Lawrence, Kansas, and raised in Oklahoma City, Oklahoma. His mother, Ilse, was from Austria and met his father, Richard Paul, when they were students at the University of Kansas. Adams was named after the biblical figure Alvan. His father worked as a petroleum geologist.

Adams attended Putnam City High School in Oklahoma City where he led the basketball team to a 67–11 record as a three-year starter. The team was undefeated during his senior year and won a state championship. He was named as the Oklahoma High School Player of the Year and a Parade All-American in 1972.

== College career ==
During 26 games of the 1973–74 season Adams tied an Oklahoma school record with 21 double-doubles for a season by a Sooner (Garfield Heard, 1969–70 also had 21 in 27 games). That record stood until it was broken by Blake Griffin on February 14, 2009.

Adams is one of only three players in the history of the University of Oklahoma men's basketball program to score at least 40 points and get 20 rebounds in a game along with Wayman Tisdale (61 points, 22 rebounds against Texas–San Antonio in 1983) and Blake Griffin (40 points, 23 rebounds against Texas Tech on February 14, 2009). After his junior season, Adams declared for hardship status in the National Basketball Association (NBA) and made himself eligible for the 1975 NBA draft.

Adams is one of only four Sooners to have his college jersey (#33) retired by the OU program (Wayman Tisdale (#23), Mookie Blaylock (#10) and Stacey King (#33) are the other three).

== Professional career ==
Adams was selected by the Phoenix Suns with the fourth pick of the 1975 NBA draft. Adams was a rookie on a Suns team whose season included an improbable playoff run that took them all the way to the 1976 NBA Finals. In the same year, he was selected to play in the All-Star Game and won the NBA Rookie of the Year Award as well as being named to the All-NBA Rookie Team.

On February 22, 1977, Adams recorded a triple-double with 47 points, 18 rebounds and 12 assists against the Buffalo Braves. He is one of five players in NBA history (along with Elgin Baylor, Wilt Chamberlain, Russell Westbrook and Vince Carter) to have as many as 46 points and 16 rebounds in a triple-double performance. Furthermore, Adams is one of two players to have recorded multiple games of at least 30 points, 15 rebounds, 5 assists, and 3 blocks in the NBA during their rookie season, along with Victor Wembanyama.

Adams's jersey number (33) was retired by the Suns, but on the signing of free agent Grant Hill, Adams granted him permission to wear his familiar No. 33 with the Suns.

Adams is the franchise leader in games played (988), minutes played (27,203), rebounds (6,937), and steals (1,289); second in field goals made and attempted; third in assists; and fourth in blocks.

In 2000, Adams served as the vice president for facility management for the Footprint Center in Phoenix, Arizona.

== NBA career statistics ==
Legend
GP	Games played	GS	Games started	MPG	Minutes per game
FG%	Field goal percentage	3P%	3-point field goal percentage	FT%	Free throw percentage
RPG	Rebounds per game	APG	Assists per game	SPG	Steals per game
BPG	Blocks per game	PPG	Points per game	**Bold**	Career high

=== Regular season ===
Year	Team	GP	GS	MPG	FG%	3P%	FT%	RPG	APG	SPG	BPG	PPG
1975–76	Phoenix	80	–	**33.2**	.469	–	.735	9.1	**5.6**	**1.5**	**1.5**	**19.0**
1976–77	Phoenix	72	–	31.6	.474	–	.754	9.1	4.5	1.3	1.2	18.0
1977–78	Phoenix	70	–	27.3	.485	–	.730	8.1	3.2	1.2	.9	15.5
1978–79	Phoenix	77	–	30.7	.530	–	.799	**9.2**	4.7	1.4	.8	17.8
1979–80	Phoenix	75	–	28.9	**.531**	.000	.797	8.1	4.3	1.4	.7	14.9
1980–81	Phoenix	75	–	27.4	.526	.000	.768	7.3	4.6	1.4	.9	14.9
1981–82	Phoenix	79	**75**	30.3	.494	.000	.781	7.4	4.5	1.4	1.0	15.1
1982–83	Phoenix	80	**75**	30.6	.486	.333	.829	6.9	4.7	1.4	.9	14.2
1983–84	Phoenix	70	13	20.7	.462	.000	.825	4.6	3.1	1.0	.4	9.6
1984–85	Phoenix	**82**	69	26.0	.520	.000	**.883**	6.1	3.8	1.4	.6	14.7
1985–86	Phoenix	78	45	25.7	.502	.000	.783	6.1	4.2	1.3	.6	10.8
1986–87	Phoenix	68	40	24.9	.503	.000	.788	5.0	3.3	.9	.5	11.1
1987–88	Phoenix	**82**	25	20.1	.496	**.500**	.844	4.5	2.2	1.0	.5	7.5
Career		988	342	27.5	.498	.133	.788	7.0	4.1	1.3	.8	14.1
All-Star		1	0	11.0	.500	–	–	3.0	–	–	–	4.0

=== Playoffs ===
Year	Team	GP	GS	MPG	FG%	3P%	FT%	RPG	APG	SPG	BPG	PPG
1976	Phoenix	**19**	–	35.2	.452	–	.817	**10.1**	5.2	1.4	1.1	**17.9**
1978	Phoenix	2	–	**35.5**	.455	–	**1.000**	8.0	2.0	1.0	.5	16.0
1979	Phoenix	12	–	31.0	.475.	–	.710	7.5	4.4	.9	1.0	12.8
1980	Phoenix	8	–	31.4	**.566**	–	.895	9.6	**5.8**	.9	1.3	16.1
1981	Phoenix	7	–	31.1	.450	–	.714	5.9	3.7	.6	.1	10.6
1982	Phoenix	7	–	33.3	.522	–	.786	7.9	3.7	2.0	.7	16.9
1983	Phoenix	3	–	28.0	.469	–	.714	6.0	4.7	.6	**1.7**	11.7
1984	Phoenix	17	–	18.4	.421	–	.679	5.1	2.5	1.0	.6	8.4
1985	Phoenix	3	3	26.3	.500	–	.833	5.7	3.7	**2.3**	0.3	17.0
Career		78	–	29.3	.473	–	.766	7.5	4.1	1.1	.9	13.8

== Personal life ==
Adams is married and has two children.

== See also ==
- List of NBA players who have spent their entire career with one franchise
