= Ricky Sobers =

American basketball player

Personal information
- Born: January 15, 1953 (age 73) The Bronx, New York, U.S.
- Listed height: 6 ft 3 in (1.91 m)
- Listed weight: 198 lb (90 kg)

Career information
- High school: DeWitt Clinton (The Bronx, New York)
- College: College of Southern Idaho (1971–1973); UNLV (1973–1975)
- NBA draft: 1975: 1st round, 16th overall pick
- Drafted by: Phoenix Suns
- Playing career: 1975–1986
- Position: Point guard
- Number: 4, 40, 14

Career history
- 1975–1977: Phoenix Suns
- 1977–1979: Indiana Pacers
- 1979–1982: Chicago Bulls
- 1982–1984: Washington Bullets
- 1984–1986: Seattle SuperSonics

Career highlights
- WCAC Player of the Year (1975); First-team All-WCAC (1975); No. 40 retired by UNLV Runnin' Rebels

Career NBA statistics
- Points: 10,902 (13.3 ppg)
- Assists: 3,525 (4.3 apg)
- Steals: 1,085 (1.3 spg)
- Stats at NBA.com
- Stats at Basketball Reference

Ricky Brad Sobers (born January 15, 1953) is an American former professional basketball player who spent eleven seasons in the National Basketball Association (NBA).

A 6'3" guard born in the Bronx, New York, Sobers attended DeWitt Clinton High School in New York City, the College of Southern Idaho, and the University of Nevada at Las Vegas before being selecting by the Phoenix Suns with the 16th pick of the 1975 NBA draft. Sobers played two seasons for the Suns. In the 1976 Finals, Sobers was a key player in "the greatest game ever played" in NBA history. In 1977, he joined the Indiana Pacers, with whom he averaged a career best 18.2 points per game during the 1977–78 NBA season.

Sobers also played with the Chicago Bulls, Washington Bullets, and Seattle SuperSonics before retiring in 1986. He compiled 10,902 points and 3,525 assists in his career.

== Career statistics ==
Legend
GP	Games played	GS	Games started	MPG	Minutes per game
FG%	Field goal percentage	3P%	3-point field goal percentage	FT%	Free throw percentage
RPG	Rebounds per game	APG	Assists per game	SPG	Steals per game
BPG	Blocks per game	PPG	Points per game	**Bold**	Career high
*	Led the league

=== NBA ===
==== Regular season ====
Year	Team	GP	GS	MPG	FG%	3P%	FT%	RPG	APG	SPG	BPG	PPG
1975–76	Phoenix	78		24.3	.449		.823	3.3	2.8	1.4	.1	9.2
1976–77	Phoenix	79		25.4	**.496**		.841	3.0	3.0	1.2	.2	13.6
1977–78	Indiana	79		**38.2**	.453		.825	**4.1**	**7.4**	**2.2**	**.3**	**18.4**
1978–79	Indiana	81		34.9	.463		.882	3.7	5.6	1.7	**.3**	17.3
1979–80	Chicago	**82**	**82**	32.6	.469	.309	.837	3.0	5.2	1.7	.2	14.2
1980–81	Chicago	71	0	25.4	.462	.258	**.935**	2.0	4.0	1.4	.2	13.5
1981–82	Chicago	80	6	24.2	.453	.250	.768	1.8	3.8	.9	.2	11.8
1982–83	Washington	41	39	35.1	.438	**.418**	.832	2.5	5.3	1.5	**.3**	15.7
1983–84	Washington	81	81	32.4	.456	.261	.837	2.2	4.7	1.4	.2	15.6
1984–85	Seattle	71	12	21.0	.446	.286	.815	1.5	3.5	.7	.1	9.9
1985–86	Seattle	78	0	16.4	.444	.302	.880	1.3	2.3	.6	.0	7.7
Career		821	220	28.0	.459	.291	.843	2.6	4.3	1.3	.2	13.3

==== Playoffs ====
Year	Team	GP	MPG	FG%	3P%	FT%	RPG	APG	SPG	BPG	PPG
1976	Phoenix	**19***	29.6	**.468**		.833	**3.3**	**4.2**	.9	.3	13.0
1981	Chicago	6	27.0	.432	.167	**.889**	1.8	3.7	.7	.0	13.2
1984	Washington	4	**37.5**	.439	**.300**	.800	1.3	4.0	**1.3**	**.5**	**15.3**
Career		29	30.2	.455	.250	.835	2.7	4.0	.9	.3	13.3
