= 1987–88 Phoenix Suns season =

NBA team season

- Head coach: John Wetzel
- General manager: Jerry Colangelo
- Owners: Jerry Colangelo
- Arena: Arizona Veterans Memorial Coliseum

Results
- Record: 28–54 (.341)
- Place: Division: 4th (Pacific); Conference: 9th (Western)
- Playoff finish: Did not qualify
- Stats at Basketball Reference

Local media
- Television: KUTP
- Radio: KTAR

The 1987–88 Phoenix Suns season was the 19th season for the Phoenix Suns in the National Basketball Association.

== Season summary ==
=== Off-season ===
The Suns were coming off from a controversial drug scandal that occurred during the previous season. In April 1987, three active players, James Edwards, Jay Humphries and Grant Gondrezick, and two former Suns players, Gar Heard and Mike Bratz, were all indicted by a county grand jury on drugs charges; All-Star guard Walter Davis was not indicted, but was found by a grand jury to have used cocaine after leaving a rehabilitation program, and was suspended by the Suns.

The team also dealt with tragedy during the off-season, when second-year center Nick Vanos was killed in an airlines crash on August 16, 1987, at the age of 24; Vanos and his fiancée, Carolyn Cohen, 25, were among 156 victims killed in the Northwest Airlines Flight 255 crash in Detroit, Michigan. For the season, the team wore a circular patch featuring Vanos' #30 jersey number on their uniforms as a tribute.

Despite finishing with a 36–46 record the previous season, the Suns received the second overall pick in the 1987 NBA draft, and selected power forward Armen Gilliam from the University of Nevada, Las Vegas. During the off-season, the team acquired Eddie Johnson from the Sacramento Kings, hired assistant coach John Wetzel as their new head coach, and released Gondrezick to free agency. In October, general manager Jerry Colangelo became the team's new owner and restructured the franchise.

=== Regular season ===
Under Wetzel, and with the addition of Gilliam and Eddie Johnson, the Suns got off to a 7–8 start to the regular season. However, the team struggled posting a 10-game losing streak between January and February, and held a 13–29 record at the All-Star break. At mid-season, the Suns traded All-Star forward Larry Nance, and Mike Sanders to the Cleveland Cavaliers in exchange for rookie point guard, and first-round draft pick Kevin Johnson, Mark West and Tyrone Corbin; the team also traded Humphries to the Milwaukee Bucks in exchange for three-point specialist Craig Hodges, and dealt Edwards to the Detroit Pistons. Before the trades, Nance averaged 21.1 points, 9.9 rebounds and 2.4 blocks per game in 40 games, while Edwards provided with 15.7 points and 7.8 rebounds per game in 43 games, and Humphries contributed 12.7 points, 7.1 assists and 1.2 steals per game in 50 games. The Suns posted a nine-game losing streak between February and March, and finished in fourth place in the Pacific Division with a 28–54 record.

Davis averaged 17.9 points, 4.1 assists and 1.3 steals per game, while Eddie Johnson averaged 17.7 points per game, and Gilliam provided the team with 14.8 points and 7.9 rebounds per game, and was named to the NBA All-Rookie Team. In addition, Kevin Johnson contributed 12.6 points, 8.7 assists and 1.5 steals per game in 28 games after the trade, while West provided with 11.8 points, 8.3 rebounds and 2.3 blocks per game in 29 games, and Hodges contributed 10.1 points per game in 23 games. Meanwhile, second-year guard Jeff Hornacek averaged 9.5 points, 6.6 assists and 1.3 steals per game, Corbin provided with 7.7 points and 4.3 rebounds per game in 30 games, Alvan Adams averaged 7.5 points and 4.5 rebounds per game, and Bernard Thompson contributed 5.2 points per game, but only appeared in just 37 games.

The Suns finished 17th in the NBA in home-game attendance, with an attendance of 452,354 at the Arizona Veterans Memorial Coliseum during the regular season.

=== Aftermath ===
Following the season, Davis signed as a free agent with the Denver Nuggets, while Adams retired after thirteen seasons in the NBA with the Suns. Meanwhile, Wetzel was fired as head coach after only one season, and Thompson was left unprotected in the 1988 NBA expansion draft, where he was selected by the Charlotte Hornets expansion team.

This would be the final season in which the Suns failed to qualify for the NBA playoffs until the 2001–02 season.

== Offseason ==
=== NBA draft ===
Round	Pick	Player	Position	Nationality	College
1	2	Armen Gilliam	Forward	United States	UNLV
2	46	Bruce Dalrymple	Guard	United States	Georgia Tech
3	53	Winston Crite	Forward	United States	Texas A&M
4	76	Steve Beck	Guard	United States	Arizona State
5	99	Brent Counts	Forward	United States	Pacific
6	122	Marcel Boyce	Forward	United States	Akron
7	145	Ron Singleton	Guard	United States	Grand Canyon

The Suns finished the 1986–87 season with the seventh worst record in the league, but managed to secure the second pick in the 1987 draft through the Draft Lottery. They lost the first pick to the San Antonio Spurs, who selected future Hall of Fame center David Robinson. With the second pick the Suns selected forward/center Armen Gilliam from UNLV. Gilliam averaged 17.3 points and 8.3 rebounds per game in three years with the Runnin' Rebels. In his senior year, he led the team to a 37–2 record while averaging 23.2 points and 9.3 rebounds per game. On October 8, the Suns signed Gilliam to an undisclosed contract, which general manager Jerry Colangelo stated was "for a long period of time", and was "the largest contract ever signed by a rookie with the Phoenix Suns." Gilliam would play part of three seasons with the Suns, averaging 14.7 points and 7.2 rebounds in 145 games, before being traded to the Charlotte Hornets in December 1989.

The Suns traded the 30th pick to the Portland Trail Blazers in 1985. With the pick the Blazers would select forward Nikita Wilson. The Suns acquired the 46th pick from a trade with the Detroit Pistons in 1983. With the pick they would select guard Bruce Dalrymple from Georgia Tech. On October 3, Dalrymple was signed to a one-year contract, but was waived on October 13 before ever playing for the franchise.

The Suns used their third-round pick to select forward Winston Crite from Texas A&M. Crite averaged 12.8 points and 7.4 rebounds per game in four years with the Aggies. Crite would play part of two seasons with the Suns, averaging 2.8 points and 2.1 rebounds in 31 games, before being waived in December 1988.

=== Drug scandal ===
On April 17, 1987, the Maricopa County attorney's office announced indictments against 13 individuals in relation to a cocaine-trafficking investigation. The indictees included Suns players James Edwards, Jay Humphries and Grant Gondrezick, and former players Garfield Heard and Mike Bratz. Edwards, Gondrezick and Bratz were charged with three counts of conspiracy to traffic in or possess a narcotic drug, while Humphries and Heard were charged with one count. A number of other current or former Suns players (Walter Davis, William Bedford, Alvin Scott, Johnny High, Don Buse and Curtis Perry) were named in the indictments but not charged. Other indictees were: Terrence Patrick Kelly, a waiter at Avanti's restaurant in Phoenix; Wynn and Kim Lesure, local businessmen; James Jordan, manager of Malarkey's nightclub in Phoenix; Joseph Beninato, a team photographer; Ramon Vives, owner of Avanti's restaurants in Phoenix and Scottsdale; Kevin Merriweather, roommate of Suns' center William Bedford; and an undisclosed team ticket taker.

The investigation began as a gambling probe in February 1987. While at Malarkey's night club on February 21, a group including James Edwards and two other NBA players allegedly claimed that that night's Suns-Bucks game (a 115–107 Milwaukee victory) would not exceed 226 points. No further evidence was cited and no mention of gambling was made in the indictments. The drug charges were in part based on testimony from Suns star Walter Davis, who was subpoenaed in March and offered immunity in exchange for testimony. Davis stated that he first used cocaine with then-teammate Garfield Heard during the 1978–79 season, and admitted to using the drug with multiple teammates. Davis had first admitted to his drug problem in December 1985 when he left the team mid-season to enter a drug rehabilitation program. Upon news of the indictments, Davis was suspended and re-entered a drug rehab program. Suns rookie center William Bedford was also granted immunity in exchange for testimony.

The story, dubbed "Waltergate", received nationwide news coverage and damaged the team's reputation. General manager Jerry Colangelo stated, "We got crucified. We were tried, convicted and hung in 72 hours." The prosecution started falling apart in July. Davis' initial questioning did not include dates, locations and other details. When questioned in regards to the details, Davis could not provide them. No defendant in the case went to trial. Edwards and Humphries were required to join a drug counseling program. Gondrezick pleaded guilty to tampering with a witness and received three-years of probation. Terrence Patrick Kelly pleaded guilty to one count of conspiring to sell a narcotic drug and was sentenced to 30 days in jail and five-years of probation. Wynn Lesure pleaded no contest to conspiracy to possess a narcotic drug and received three-years of probation. All other charges were dismissed. This scandal led to the original ownership of the team looking to sell the franchise to someone else, potentially to move them elsewhere as well.

=== Death of Nick Vanos ===
On August 16, 1987, Suns center Nick Vanos and his fiancée Carolyn Cohen were among 156 killed in the Northwest Airlines Flight 255 crash. Vanos and Cohen, who had spent four days on vacation in Michigan, were returning to Phoenix when the flight crashed after takeoff due to pilot error. Separate lawsuits were filed against Northwest Airlines by the Suns and Vanos' parents. The team filed a property damage suit against the airline, due to the three years remaining on Vanos' five-year contract, claiming the center to be "irreplaceable". Nick's parents, Peter and Josie, filed a wrongful death suit seeking $13.85 million in damages.

We are stunned, shocked, and deeply saddened at the loss of Nick Vanos. It's just a terrible shock when a young man loses his life at such an early age. Nick recently appeared to be coming into his own and to have his life taken away at this time is a tragedy to his family, friends and to our organization.

— Jerry Colangelo,

Vanos had spent most of his two seasons as a backup center. Appearing in 11 games his rookie season, Vanos averaged 4.9 points and 5.5 rebounds per game. Through 57 games in his sophomore season, he averaged 2.9 points and 3.2 rebounds per game. Vanos' role would increase late in the season due to injuries to centers James Edwards and William Bedford. He would start the final 10 games of the season, during which the team would go 9–1. His production jumped to 7.0 points, 7.8 rebounds and 1.9 assists per game during the stretch. His promising developments would lead the Suns to trade Bedford, their number one pick in the 1986 draft, to the Detroit Pistons the day before the 1987 draft. With their longtime center Alvan Adams nearing retirement, and with the oft-injured Edwards facing trial on cocaine conspiracy charges, Vanos was expected to be the team's starting center to start the 1987–88 season.

The 7'2", 260 pound left-hander had become a cult favorite with Suns fan. He had developed a 145-member fan club, which sold "Let Nick Play" T-shirts. The Suns dedicated the 1987–88 season to his memory, and the players wore a black #30 patch on their jerseys throughout the year.

Another Suns player caught up in the drug scandal, Johnny High, died after crashing his car, at a high speed, into a freeway underpass.

=== Franchise sold ===
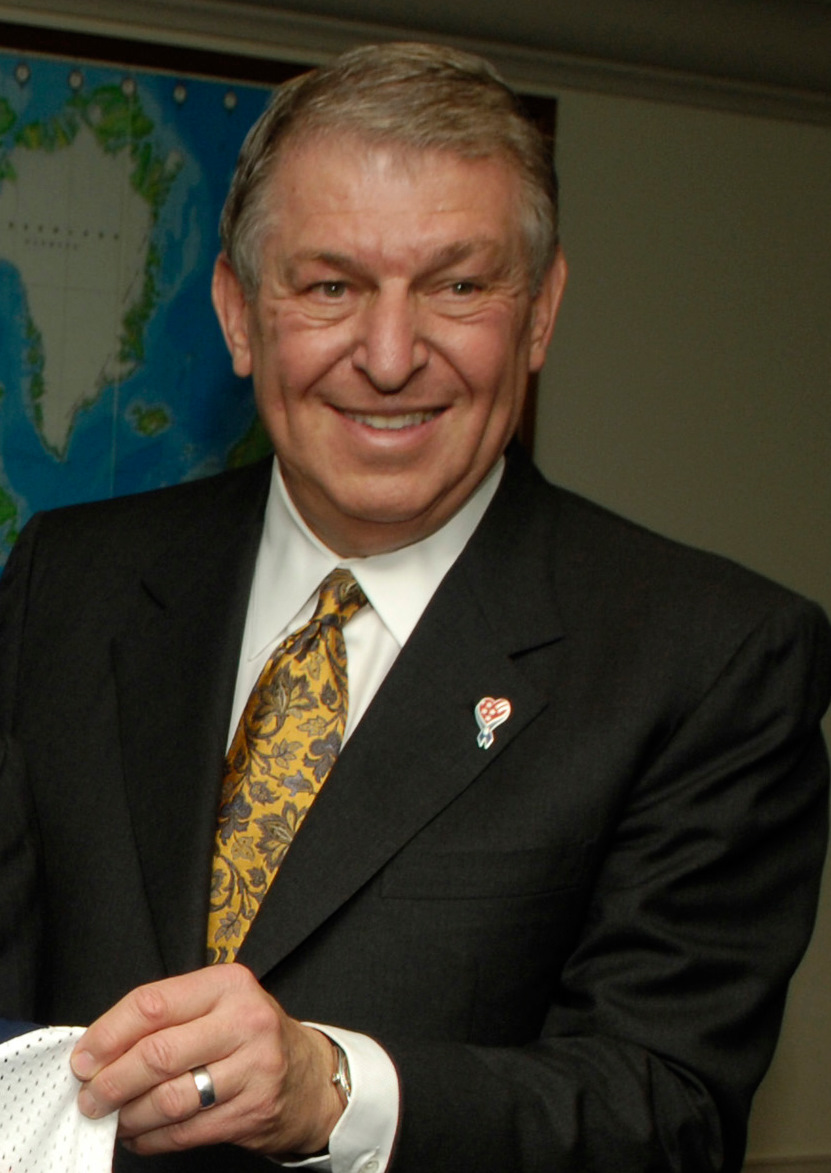
Jerry Colangelo

On October 14, 1987, a group headed by Suns general manager and vice president Jerry Colangelo purchased the franchise from owners Richard L. Bloch, Donald Pitt and Don Diamond for a then-record $44.5 million. Colangelo headed JDM Sports Inc., the general partnership group that owned a controlling interest of the franchise. 10 other limited partners assisted with the purchase, including the Greyhound Corporation, the El Dorado Investment Company, and the Phoenix General Basketball Partnership group, which included Suns legend and former interim coach Dick Van Arsdale, team physician Paul Steingard, team orthopedist Richard Emerson, and team podiatrist Michael Kates. Colangelo assumed the role of chief executive officer and team president. Van Arsdale replaced Colangelo as vice president.

Twenty years ago, Donald Pitt, Don Diamond and Richard Bloch had the foresight to see that Phoenix had the ability to be a professional sports franchise despite the cynics back East. It has been a profitable and a successful endeavor. To own a team is a dream-come-true for me personally. This is going to be a good deal and it's going to work. We're going to re-dedicate this team to the community.

— Jerry Colangelo,

In the wake of the damaging drug scandal, Bloch, Pitt and Diamond were prepared to sell the team. Colangelo feared potential buyers planned to relocate the franchise to another city. The sale was finalized on October 16, just days before the October 19 "Black Monday" stock market crash happened. Colangelo later stated that if the deal had not been completed prior, it would not have happened, and that the team likely would've been sold and relocated.

=== Free agency ===
On June 11, the Suns signed free agent guard Joe Ward, forward Bill Martin and guard Victor Fleming. Ward, the Suns second-round pick in 1986, had been the team's final preseason cut the previous season. Ward was again cut before the season. Martin had previously played for the Indiana Pacers and New York Knicks in between stints with the CBA. Martin appeared in 10 games with the Suns before being waived on December 26. Fleming, the brother of Vern Fleming, was waived on October 19, re-signed on October 21, and waived again on November 1.

In early October, the Suns signed free agent forward Jeff Cook, and centers Greg Spurling and Ozell Jones. Cook had previously played with the franchise from 1979 to 1983, and had just returned from a stint in Italy before re-signing with Suns. He would appear in just 33 games and spend much of the season on the injured list. Spurling was waived on October 21, while Jones was waived on November 1. On October 20, the Suns signed restricted free agent center Alton Lister to a four-year offer sheet worth $3.5 million. The SuperSonics matched the offer, keeping him in Seattle.

== Roster ==
1987–88 Phoenix Suns roster
Players

Pos.	No.	Player	Height	Weight	DOB	From
F/C	33	Alvan Adams	6 ft 9 in (2.06 m)	210 lb (95 kg)	1954-07-19	Oklahoma
F	2	James Bailey	6 ft 9 in (2.06 m)	220 lb (100 kg)	1957-05-21	Rutgers
F/C	45	Jeff Cook (injured)	6 ft 10 in (2.08 m)	215 lb (98 kg)	1956-10-21	Idaho State
F	23	Tyrone Corbin	6 ft 6 in (1.98 m)	210 lb (95 kg)	1962-12-31	DePaul
F	12	Winston Crite	6 ft 7 in (2.01 m)	233 lb (106 kg)	1965-06-20	Texas A&M
G/F	6	Walter Davis	6 ft 6 in (1.98 m)	193 lb (88 kg)	1954-09-09	North Carolina
F	44	Kenny Gattison (injured) (IN)	6 ft 8 in (2.03 m)	225 lb (102 kg)	1964-05-23	Old Dominion
F/C	35	Armen Gilliam	6 ft 9 in (2.06 m)	230 lb (104 kg)	1964-05-28	UNLV
G	25	Craig Hodges	6 ft 2 in (1.88 m)	190 lb (86 kg)	1960-06-27	Long Beach State
G	14	Jeff Hornacek	6 ft 3 in (1.91 m)	190 lb (86 kg)	1963-05-03	Iowa State
F	8	Eddie Johnson	6 ft 7 in (2.01 m)	215 lb (98 kg)	1959-05-01	Illinois
G	11	Kevin Johnson	6 ft 1 in (1.85 m)	180 lb (82 kg)	1966-03-04	California
C	53	Ron Moore	7 ft 0 in (2.13 m)	260 lb (118 kg)	1962-01-16	West Virginia State
G/F	7	Bernard Thompson	6 ft 6 in (1.98 m)	210 lb (95 kg)	1962-08-30	Fresno State
C	41	Mark West	6 ft 10 in (2.08 m)	230 lb (104 kg)	1960-11-05	Old Dominion

Coaches
Head coach
- John Wetzel (Virginia Tech)
Assistant(s)
- Herb Brown (Vermont)

Legend
- (DP) Unsigned draft pick
- (FA) Free agent
- (S) Suspended
- Injured

=== Roster notes ===
- Power forward Kenny Gattison was on the injured reserve list due to a left knee injury, and missed the entire regular season.

== Regular season ==
=== Standings ===
Pacific Division	W	L	PCT	GB	Home	Road	Div
y-Los Angeles Lakers	62	20	.756	–	36–5	26–15	23–7
x-Portland Trail Blazers	53	29	.646	9	33–8	20–21	23–7
x-Seattle SuperSonics	44	38	.537	18	32–9	12–29	19–11
Phoenix Suns	28	54	.341	34	22–19	6–35	11–19
Golden State Warriors	20	62	.244	42	16–25	4–37	7–23
Los Angeles Clippers	17	65	.207	45	14–27	3–38	7–23

#	Western Conference				
#	Team	W	L	PCT	GB
1	z-Los Angeles Lakers	62	20	.756	–
2	y-Denver Nuggets	54	28	.659	8
3	x-Dallas Mavericks	53	29	.646	9
4	x-Portland Trail Blazers	53	29	.646	9
5	x-Utah Jazz	47	35	.573	15
6	x-Houston Rockets	46	36	.561	16
7	x-Seattle SuperSonics	44	38	.537	18
8	x-San Antonio Spurs	31	51	.378	31
9	Phoenix Suns	28	54	.341	34
10	Sacramento Kings	24	58	.293	38
11	Golden State Warriors	20	62	.244	42
12	Los Angeles Clippers	17	65	.207	45

== Game log ==
=== Regular season ===
1987–88 game log
Total: 28–54 (Home: 22–19; Road: 6–35)
November: 0–0 (home: 0–0; road: 0–0)

Game	Date	Team	Score	High points	High rebounds	High assists	Location Attendance	Record

December: 0–0 (home: 0–0; road: 0–0)

Game	Date	Team	Score	High points	High rebounds	High assists	Location Attendance	Record
18	December 15, 1987; 8:30 PM MST	@ L.A. Lakers	L 97–122				The Forum; 17,371	7–11

January: 0–0 (home: 0–0; road: 0–0)

Game	Date	Team	Score	High points	High rebounds	High assists	Location Attendance	Record
33	January 16, 1988; 7:30 PM MST	L.A. Lakers	L 96–107				Arizona Veterans Memorial Coliseum; 14,471	13–20

February: 0–0 (home: 0–0; road: 0–0)

Game	Date	Team	Score	High points	High rebounds	High assists	Location Attendance	Record
54	February 28, 1988; 8:30 PM MST	@ L.A. Lakers	L 97–111				The Forum; 17,505	17–37

March: 0–0 (home: 0–0; road: 0–0)

Game	Date	Team	Score	High points	High rebounds	High assists	Location Attendance	Record
60	March 11, 1988; 5:30 PM MST	@ Detroit	L 88–116				Pontiac Silverdome; 21,612	17–43
64	March 19, 1988; 7:30 PM MST	L.A. Lakers	W 102–95				Arizona Veterans Memorial Coliseum; 14,471	20–44
68	March 26, 1988; 7:30 PM MST	Detroit	L 103–108				Arizona Veterans Memorial Coliseum; 14,025	22–46

April: 0–0 (home: 0–0; road: 0–0)

Game	Date	Team	Score	High points	High rebounds	High assists	Location Attendance	Record
77	April 15, 1988; 7:30 PM MST	@ L.A. Lakers	L 114–117				The Forum; 17,505	26–51
81	April 22, 1988; 7:30 PM MST	L.A. Lakers	L 112–117				Arizona Veterans Memorial Coliseum; 14,077	28–53

1987–88 schedule

== Awards and honors ==
=== Week/Month ===
- Larry Nance was named Player of the Month for December.
- Larry Nance was named Player of the Week for games played December 14 through December 20.
- Kevin Johnson was named Rookie of the Month for April.

=== All-Star ===
This was only the second year in franchise history that the Suns were not represented in the All-Star Game.

=== Season ===
- Armon Gilliam was named to the NBA All-Rookie First Team.
- Craig Hodges led the league in three-point field goal percentage, making .491% of his attempts. Hodges had a .466% average with the Bucks, and a .544% average with the Suns.

== Player statistics ==
Legend
GP	Games played	GS	Games started	MPG	Minutes per game
FG%	Field-goal percentage	3P%	3-point field-goal percentage	FT%	Free-throw percentage
RPG	Rebounds per game	APG	Assists per game	SPG	Steals per game
BPG	Blocks per game	PPG	Points per game

=== Season ===
Phoenix Suns statistics
Player	GP	GS	MPG	FG%	3P%	FT%	RPG	APG	SPG	BPG	PPG
Alvan Adams	82	25	20.1	.496	.500	.844	4.5	2.2	1.0	.5	7.5
James Bailey	65	0	13.4	.452	.000	.787	3.2	0.6	.3	.4	4.4
Jeff Cook	33	0	10.9	.237	.000	.821	3.2	0.4	.3	.2	1.5
Tyrone Corbin*	30	1	19.7	.488	.333	.825	4.3	2.0	1.0	.1	7.7
Winston Crite	29	0	8.9	.500	.	.760	2.2	0.5	.2	.3	3.0
Walter Davis	68	48	28.7	.473	.375	.887^	2.3	4.1	1.3	.0	17.9+
James Edwards*	43	42	32.0	.469	.000	.635	7.8	1.7	.3	.7+	15.7
Armon Gilliam	55	53	32.9+	.475	.	.679	7.9+	1.3	1.1	.5+	14.8
Craig Hodges*	23	0	20.1	.489	.544	.844	1.4	1.9	.7	.1	10.1
Jeff Hornacek	82	49	27.4	.506	.293	.822	3.2	6.6	1.3+	.1	9.5
Jay Humphries*	50	33	31.1	.545	.188	.741	3.0	7.1+	1.2	.1	12.7
Eddie Johnson	73	59	29.8	.480	.255	.850	4.4	2.5	.5	.1	17.7
Kevin Johnson*	28	25	31.2	.463	.200	.859	4.3	8.7+	1.5+	.3	12.6
Bill Martin	10	0	10.1	.314	.000	.615	2.7	0.6	.5	.0	4.0
Ron Moore*	5	0	6.8	.313	.	1.000^	1.2	0.0	.6	.0	2.8
Larry Nance*	40	34	36.9+	.531	.400	.751	9.9+	3.1	1.1	2.4+	21.1+
Mike Sanders*	35	5	13.3	.480	.000	.736	1.8	0.9	.5	.1	5.8
Bernard Thompson	37	7	15.3	.465	.000	.717	2.1	1.4	.6	.0	5.2
Mark West*	29	29	31.6	.521	.000	.568	8.3+	0.8	.8	2.3+	11.8

* – Stats with the Suns.
^ – Minimum 125 free throws made.
+ – Minimum 50 games played.

== Transactions ==
=== Trades ===
June 21, 1987	To Sacramento Kings (United States) Ed Pinckney 1988 second-round draft pick ( (United States) Fennis Dembo)	To Phoenix Suns (United States) Eddie Johnson
June 21, 1987	To Detroit Pistons (United States) William Bedford	To Phoenix Suns 1988 first-round draft pick ( (United States) Randolph Keys)
October 29, 1987	To Cleveland 1989 second-round draft pick ( (United States) Greg Grant)	To Phoenix Suns (United States) James Bailey
February 24, 1988	To Detroit Pistons (United States) James Edwards	To Phoenix Suns (United States) Ron Moore 1991 second-round draft pick ( (United States) Richard Dumas)
February 25, 1988	To Milwaukee Bucks (United States) Jay Humphries	To Phoenix Suns (United States) Craig Hodges 1988 second-round draft pick ( (United States) Andrew Lang)
February 25, 1988	To Cleveland Cavaliers (United States) Larry Nance (United States) Mike Sanders 1988 first-round draft pick ( (United States) Randolph Keys)	To Phoenix Suns (United States) Tyrone Corbin (United States) Kevin Johnson (United States) Mark West 1988 first-round draft pick ( (United States) Dan Majerle) 1988 second-round draft pick ( (United States) Dean Garrett) 1989 second-round draft pick ( (United States) Greg Grant)

=== Free agents ===
==== Additions ====
Date	Player	Contract	Former Team
June 11, 1987	Bill Martin	Undisclosed	New York Knicks
October 2, 1987	Jeff Cook	Undisclosed	Libertas Livorno (Italy)

==== Subtractions ====
Date	Player	Reason left	New team
October 13, 1987	Grant Gondrezick	Waived	Caen Basket Calvados (France)
October 19, 1987	Rafael Addison	Waived	Libertas Livorno (Italy)
December 28, 1987	Bill Martin	Waived	Olimpia Milano (Italy)

Player Transactions Citation:
