= John Wetzel (basketball) =

American basketball player and coach (born 1944)

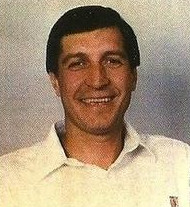
- Wetzel in 1987

Personal information
- Born: October 22, 1944 (age 82) Waynesboro, Virginia, U.S.
- Listed height: 6 ft 5 in (1.96 m)
- Listed weight: 190 lb (86 kg)

Career information
- High school: Wilson Memorial (Fishersville, Virginia)
- College: Virginia Tech (1963–1966)
- NBA draft: 1966: 8th round, 75th overall pick
- Drafted by: Los Angeles Lakers
- Playing career: 1967–1976
- Position: Small forward / shooting guard
- Number: 24, 25, 33

Career history

Playing
- 1967–1968: Los Angeles Lakers
- 1970–1972: Phoenix Suns
- 1972–1975: Atlanta Hawks
- 1975–1976: Phoenix Suns

Coaching
- 1976–1977: Virginia Tech
- 1979–1987: Phoenix Suns (assistant)
- 1987–1988: Phoenix Suns
- 1988–1994: Portland Trail Blazers (assistant)
- 1994–1995: New Jersey Nets (assistant)
- 1995–1997: Golden State Warriors (assistant)
- 1998–2004: Sacramento Kings (assistant)

Career NBA statistics
- Points: 1,215 (3.4 ppg)
- Rebounds: 682 (1.9 rpg)
- Assists: 494 (1.4 apg)
- Stats at NBA.com
- Stats at Basketball Reference

John Francis Wetzel (born October 22, 1944) is an American former professional basketball player and coach. A 6'5" guard, he attended Wilson Memorial High School in Fishersville, VA, and played collegiately at Virginia Tech and was selected by the Los Angeles Lakers in the 8th round of the 1966 NBA draft. Over a seven-year career, Wetzel played for three teams: the Lakers, the Phoenix Suns, and the Atlanta Hawks. He later coached the Suns during the 1987-88 NBA season. He served as an assistant for several other teams, retiring from basketball in 2004. Wetzel currently splits time in Tucson, Arizona and Maui, Hawaii.

== Career statistics ==
Legend
GP	Games played	GS	Games started	MPG	Minutes per game
FG%	Field goal percentage	3P%	3-point field goal percentage	FT%	Free throw percentage
RPG	Rebounds per game	APG	Assists per game	SPG	Steals per game
BPG	Blocks per game	PPG	Points per game	**Bold**	Career high

=== NBA ===
==== Regular season ====
Year	Team	GP	MPG	FG%	FT%	RPG	APG	SPG	BPG	PPG
1967–68	L.A. Lakers	38	11.4	.437	.761	2.2	1.3			3.7
1970–71	Phoenix	**70**	15.6	.431	.822	2.2	1.6			**4.7**
1971–72	Phoenix	51	8.2	.378	.800	1.3	1.1			1.7
1972–73	Atlanta	28	**18.0**	.447	.824	2.1	1.4			3.5
1973–74	Atlanta	**70**	17.6	.425	.719	**2.4**	**2.0**	**1.0**	**.3**	3.6
1974–75	Atlanta	63	12.5	.426	**.883**	1.8	1.2	.8	.1	3.8
1975–76	Portland	37	6.7	**.478**	.833	1.0	.5	.2	.1	1.7
Career		357	13.2	.429	.810	1.9	1.4	.8	.2	3.4

==== Playoffs ====
Year	Team	GP	MPG	FG%	FT%	RPG	APG	SPG	BPG	PPG
1973	Atlanta	**3**	**11.0**	**.429**	–	.7	**1.3**			**2.0**
1976	Phoenix	2	2.5	–	**1.000**	**1.0**	.0	.0	.0	1.0
Career		5	7.6	.429	1.000	.8	.8	.0	.0	1.6

== Head coaching record ==
Legend
Regular season	G	Games coached	W	Games won	L	Games lost	W–L %	Win–loss %
Playoffs	PG	Playoff games	PW	Playoff wins	PL	Playoff losses	PW–L %	Playoff win–loss %

Team	Year	G	W	L	W–L%	Finish	PG	PW	PL	PW–L%	Result
Phoenix	1987–88	82	28	54	.341	4th in Pacific	—	—	—	—	Missed playoffs
