= Nate Hawthorne =

American basketball player (1951–2005)

Personal information
- Born: January 19, 1951 Mount Vernon, Illinois, U.S.
- Died: November 23, 2005 (aged 54) Tempe, Arizona, U.S.
- Listed height: 6 ft 4 in (1.93 m)
- Listed weight: 190 lb (86 kg)

Career information
- High school: Mt. Vernon (Mount Vernon, Illinois)
- College: Southern Illinois (1970–1973)
- NBA draft: 1973: 7th round, 118th overall pick
- Drafted by: Los Angeles Lakers
- Playing career: 1973–1976
- Position: Shooting guard
- Number: 20, 32

Career history
- 1973–1974: Los Angeles Lakers
- 1974–1976: Phoenix Suns
- Stats at NBA.com
- Stats at Basketball Reference

Nate Hawthorne (January 19, 1951 – November 23, 2005) was an American professional basketball player. He spent three seasons in the National Basketball Association (NBA), one with the Los Angeles Lakers (1973–74) and two with the Phoenix Suns (1974–76). The Mount Vernon, Illinois, native attended Southern Illinois University prior to his NBA stint. He died at the age of 54 outside his home in Tempe, Arizona, suffering a massive heart attack.

== Career statistics ==
Legend
GP	Games played	GS	Games started	MPG	Minutes per game
FG%	Field goal percentage	3P%	3-point field goal percentage	FT%	Free throw percentage
RPG	Rebounds per game	APG	Assists per game	SPG	Steals per game
BPG	Blocks per game	PPG	Points per game	**Bold**	Career high

=== NBA ===
==== Regular season ====
Year	Team	GP	MPG	FG%	FT%	RPG	APG	SPG	BPG	PPG
1973–74	L.A. Lakers	33	6.9	.409	.625	1.0	.7	.3	.2	3.2
1974–75	Phoenix	50	12.4	.411	.649	1.8	**.8**	**.6**	**.4**	5.9
1975–76	Phoenix	**79**	**14.5**	**.430**	**.676**	**2.6**	.6	.4	.2	**6.1**
Career		162	12.3	.421	.660	2.1	.7	.4	.3	5.4

==== Playoffs ====
Year	Team	GP	MPG	FG%	FT%	RPG	APG	SPG	BPG	PPG
1974	L.A. Lakers	3	4.7	.143	**.800**	.7	**.7**	**.3**	**.3**	**2.0**
1976	Phoenix	**15**	**5.4**	**.346**	.727	**1.1**	.3	**.3**	.1	1.7
Career		18	5.3	.303	.750	1.0	.3	.3	.1	1.8
