= 1976 NBA All-Star Game =

Exhibition basketball game

	1	2	3	4	Total
East	28	17	38	40	123
West	23	27	30	29	109
- Date: February 3, 1976
- Arena: Spectrum
- City: Philadelphia
- MVP: Dave Bing
- Attendance: 17,511
- Network: CBS
- Announcers: Brent Musburger and Mendy Rudolph

NBA All-Star Game
< 1975	1977 >

The 1976 NBA All Star Game, also known as the 26th Annual NBA All Star Game, was an exhibition basketball game played on February 3, 1976, at the Spectrum in Philadelphia, home of the Philadelphia 76ers. It was the third NBA All-Star game to be held at Philadelphia—following the 1960 (hosted by the Philadelphia Warriors) and 1970 games—and the second hosted by the 76ers, which hosted its first in 1961 as the Syracuse Nationals. It also marked the final All-Star Game held at the Spectrum. It was also the final NBA All-Star Game played on a weekday, being played on a Tuesday, before the NBA switching All-Star games to a Sunday game the following season, as well as the final one before the ABA–NBA merger. Philadelphia hosted three of the major four league All-Star Games (the NFL's Pro Bowl in New Orleans was the exception) in honor of the Bicenntenial.

The East All-Stars beat the West All-Stars 123–109. Dave Bing of the Washington Bullets was named the Most Valuable Player.

== Coaches ==
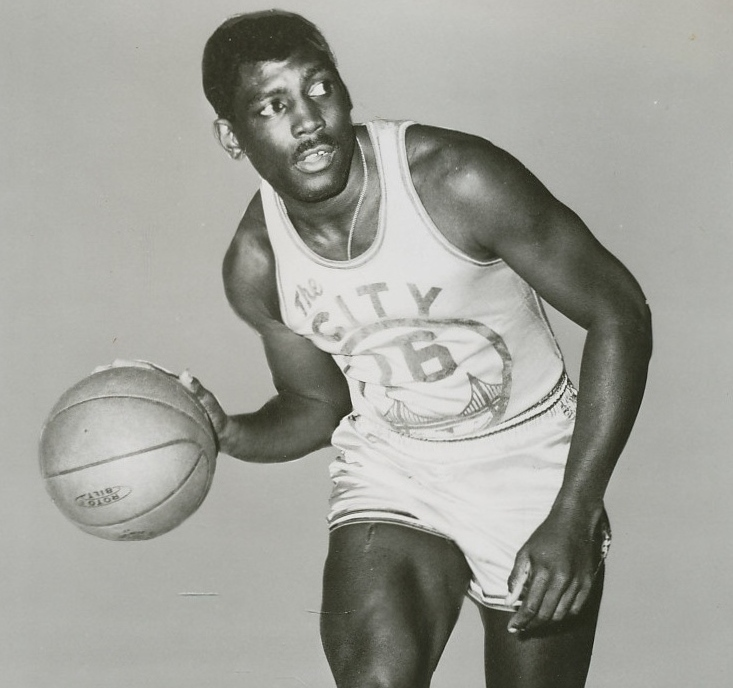
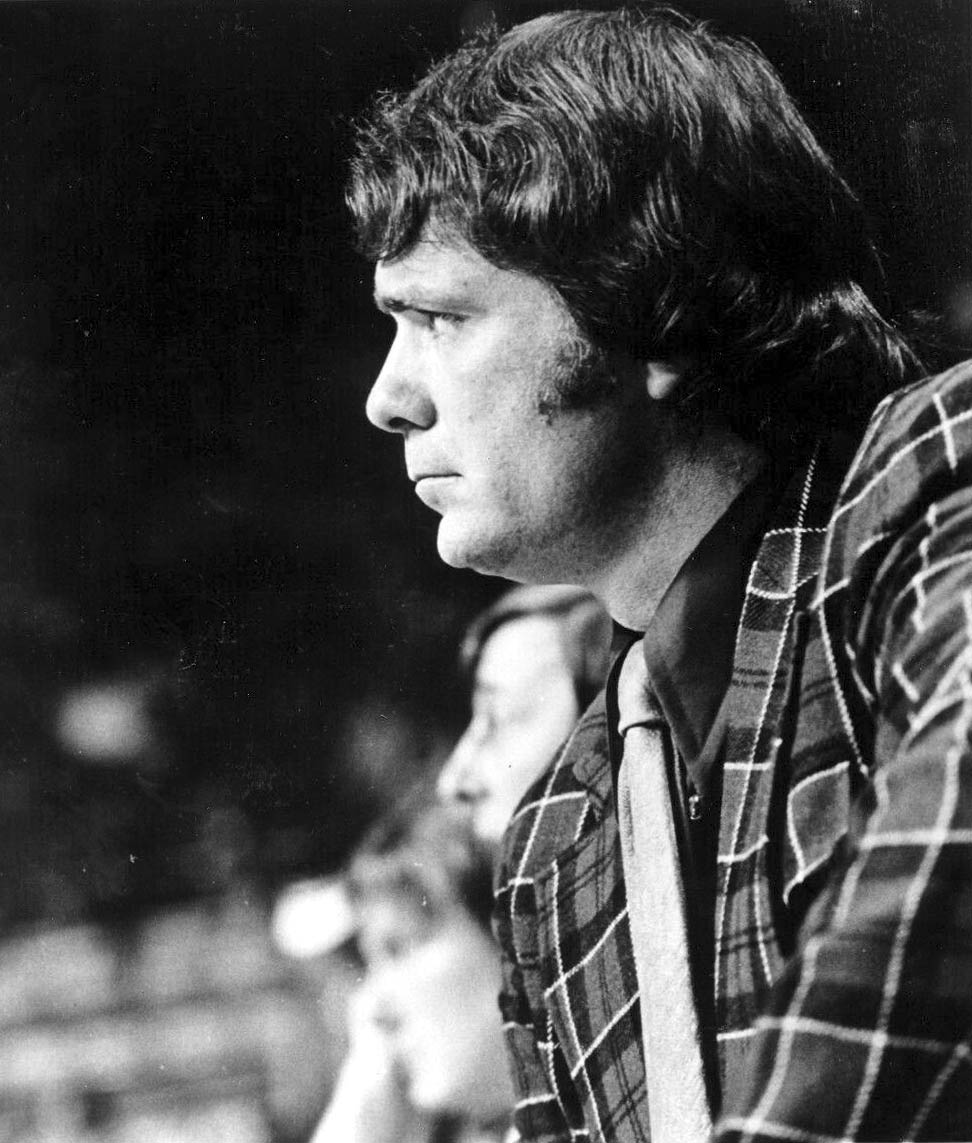
Al Attles and Tom Heinsohn were selected as the West and East head coach, respectively.

Tom Heinsohn, head coach of the Eastern Conference leader Boston Celtics, qualified as the head coach of the Eastern All-Stars. Al Attles, head coach of the Western Conference leader Golden State Warriors, qualified as the head coach of the Western All-Stars.

== Roster ==
=== Eastern Conference ===
Player, Team	MIN	FGM	FGA	FTM	FTA	ORB	DRB	REB	AST	STL	BLK	PFS	PTS
Elvin Hayes, WAS	31	6	14	0	2	3	7	10	1	1	0	5	12
Bob McAdoo, BUF	29	10	14	2	4	2	5	7	1	0	0	5	22
Dave Bing, WAS	26	7	11	2	2	1	2	3	4	0	0	1	16
Dave Cowens, BOS	23	6	13	4	5	8	8	16	1	1	0	3	16
John Havlicek, BOS	21	3	10	3	3	1	1	2	2	1	0	0	9
Doug Collins, PHI	20	5	10	2	2	2	4	6	3	3	0	3	12
George McGinnis, PHI	19	4	9	2	4	1	6	7	2	0	0	2	10
Walt Frazier, NY	19	2	7	4	4	0	2	2	3	2	0	0	8
Jo Jo White, BOS	16	3	7	0	0	0	1	1	1	2	0	1	6
Randy Smith, BUF	15	4	7	0	0	1	0	1	3	1	1	0	8
Rudy Tomjanovich, HOU	12	1	2	0	0	1	2	3	0	0	0	2	2
John Drew, ATL	9	1	3	0	0	1	2	3	0	0	0	2	2
Totals	240	52	107	19	26	21	40	61	21	11	1	24	123

=== Western Conference ===
Player, Team	MIN	FGM	FGA	FTM	FTA	ORB	DRB	REB	AST	STL	BLK	PFS	PTS
Kareem Abdul-Jabbar, LA	36	9	16	4	4	2	13	15	3	0	3	3	22
Nate Archibald, KC	30	5	13	3	3	2	3	5	7	2	0	0	13
Rick Barry, GS	28	6	15	5	5	2	2	4	2	2	0	5	17
Bob Dandridge, MIL	27	5	10	0	0	5	1	6	0	3	0	4	10
Fred Brown, SEA	24	7	13	0	0	0	0	0	1	5	0	3	14
Scott Wedman, KC	20	4	5	0	0	0	6	6	2	1	0	2	8
Brian Winters, MIL	16	1	5	0	0	0	2	2	1	1	0	2	2
Jamaal Wilkes, GS	14	3	9	2	2	3	1	4	2	1	0	0	8
Norm Van Lier, CHI	14	1	4	1	2	1	0	1	0	1	1	2	3
Phil Smith, GS	12	3	7	1	4	0	1	1	0	0	0	1	7
Alvan Adams, PHO	11	2	4	0	0	2	1	3	0	0	0	1	4
Curtis Rowe, DET	8	0	2	1	2	0	2	2	0	0	0	2	1
Totals	240	46	103	17	22	17	32	49	18	16	4	25	109

== Score by periods ==
Score by periods:	1	2	3	4	Final
East	28	17	38	40	123
West	23	27	30	29	109

- Halftime— West, 50–45
- Third Quarter— East, 83–80
- Officials: Paul Mihalak and Darell Garretson
- Attendance: 17,511
