= Phil Lumpkin =

American basketball player and coach (1951–2009)

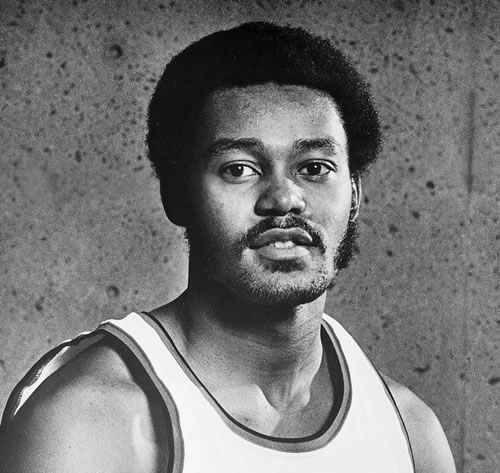

Personal information
- Born: December 20, 1951 Dayton, Ohio, U.S.
- Died: November 2, 2009 (aged 57) Seattle, Washington, U.S.
- Listed height: 6 ft 0 in (1.83 m)
- Listed weight: 165 lb (75 kg)

Career information
- High school: Nettie Lee Roth (Dayton, Ohio)
- College: Miami (Ohio) (1971–1974)
- NBA draft: 1974: 2nd round, 34th overall pick
- Drafted by: Portland Trail Blazers
- Playing career: 1974–1976
- Position: Point guard
- Number: 10

Career history
- 1974–1975: Portland Trail Blazers
- 1975–1976: Phoenix Suns

Career highlights
- 2× First-team All-MAC (1973, 1974)
- Stats at NBA.com
- Stats at Basketball Reference

Phil Lumpkin (December 20, 1951 – November 2, 2009) was an American professional basketball player and high school basketball coach.

== Early life ==
Lumpkin was born in Dayton, Ohio the son of Harold and Dorothy Lumpkin. He starred at Roth High School in Dayton, where he teamed at guard with another future NBA player, Don Smith. Lumpkin graduated from Roth in 1970.

== College career ==
Lumpkin played college basketball at Miami University in Oxford, Ohio, where he lettered for three years. He became the starting point guard as a sophomore, averaging a team-leading 16.7 points and 3.5 assists per game.

As a junior in 1972–73, he averaged 13.8 points and 5.7 assists and led Miami to the Mid-American Conference (MAC) title. As a senior, he again led the team with 18.1 points and 5.7 assists per game.

In 1981, he received his degree in Physical Education from Miami.

== NBA career ==
A 6-foot-0-inch (1.83 m) and 165 pounds (75 kg) point guard, Lumpkin was selected by the Portland Trail Blazers in the second round (34th overall) of the 1974 NBA draft, opting to play for that team instead of the Virginia Squires which selected him in the American Basketball Association draft. He played two seasons in the NBA as a member of the Blazers and Phoenix Suns, averaging 3.3 points per game.

As a rookie, he played in 48 games, averaging 16.5 minutes, 4.2 points and 3.7 assists per game. Coach Lenny Wilkens did, however, start him at point guard for a seven-game stretch in which Lumpkin averaged 9.1 points and 8.3 assists in 35.7 minutes of playing time per game as the Blazers won three of the seven. He also had 10 assists in two of those games. His high-point game was on January 10, 1975, with 14 points against the Phoenix Suns.

On June 9, 1975, he was traded to the Phoenix Suns. In 34 games, he averaged 10.9 minutes, 2.1 points, and 1.4 assists per game, and the Suns advanced to the NBA Finals, losing four games to two to the Boston Celtics.

On October 15, 1976, he was waived by the Suns, ending his two-year NBA career.

== Coaching career ==
In 1991, Lumpkin became a physical education teacher and head coach of the boys' basketball program at O'Dea High School in Seattle, Washington. Between 1993 and 2007, the team advanced to seven state finals and won five Class 3A state titles, in 1993, 1997, 2004, 2005, and 2008. He died two years after winning his last title in 2007, and was later succeeded by Al Hairston another legendary Seattle area prep boys basketball coach.

== Personal life ==
In 1983, Lumpkin was inducted into the Miami University Athletic Hall of Fame.

He was discovered dead on the Monday morning of November 2, 2009, shortly after being diagnosed with pneumonia. He was 57 years old. He was survived by a son.

Shortly before his death, he was selected for induction into the Washington Interscholastic Basketball Association Hall of Fame. Also in his honor, the O'Dea High School basketball court was renamed Phil Lumpkin Court.

== Career statistics ==
Legend
GP	Games played	GS	Games started	MPG	Minutes per game
FG%	Field goal percentage	3P%	3-point field goal percentage	FT%	Free throw percentage
RPG	Rebounds per game	APG	Assists per game	SPG	Steals per game
BPG	Blocks per game	PPG	Points per game	**Bold**	Career high

=== NBA ===
==== Regular season ====
Year	Team	GP	MPG	FG%	FT%	RPG	APG	SPG	BPG	PPG
1974–75	Portland	**48**	**16.5**	**.453**	.769	**1.2**	**3.7**	**.4**	**.1**	**4.2**
1975–76	Phoenix	34	10.9	.338	**.867**	.7	1.4	**.4**	.0	2.1
Career		82	14.2	.424	.812	1.0	2.7	.4	.0	3.3

==== Playoffs ====
Year	Team	GP	MPG	FG%	FT%	RPG	APG	SPG	BPG	PPG
1976	Phoenix	17	8.0	.333	.786	.8	1.2	.1	.0	1.8
