= Gar Heard =

American basketball player and coach (born 1948)

Personal information
- Born: May 3, 1948 (age 78) Hogansville, Georgia, U.S.
- Listed height: 6 ft 6 in (1.98 m)
- Listed weight: 219 lb (99 kg)

Career information
- High school: Ethel Knight (LaGrange, Georgia)
- College: Oklahoma (1967–1970)
- NBA draft: 1970: 3rd round, 40th overall pick
- Drafted by: Seattle SuperSonics
- Playing career: 1970–1981
- Position: Power forward
- Number: 40, 24

Career history

Playing
- 1970–1972: Seattle SuperSonics
- 1972–1973: Chicago Bulls
- 1973–1976: Buffalo Braves
- 1976–1980: Phoenix Suns
- 1980–1981: San Diego Clippers

Coaching
- 1987–1993: Dallas Mavericks (assistant)
- 1992–1993: Dallas Mavericks (interim)
- 1993–1997: Indiana Pacers (assistant)
- 1997–1998: Philadelphia 76ers (assistant)
- 1998–1999: Detroit Pistons (assistant)
- 1999–2000: Washington Wizards
- 2000–2001: Atlanta Hawks (assistant)
- 2004–2005: Detroit Pistons (assistant)

Career highlights
- First-team All-Big Eight (1970)

Career NBA statistics
- Points: 6,828 (8.7 ppg)
- Rebounds: 5,876 (7.5 rpg)
- Assists: 1,220 (1.6 apg)
- Stats at NBA.com
- Stats at Basketball Reference

Garfield Heard (born May 3, 1948) is an American former professional basketball player and coach. He played collegiately at the University of Oklahoma where he was named first-team All-Big Eight as a senior. Heard was selected by the Seattle SuperSonics (now the Oklahoma City Thunder) in the third round of the 1970 NBA draft. He had an 11-year NBA career for four franchises and five teams: the SuperSonics, the Buffalo Braves, the Chicago Bulls, the Phoenix Suns, and the San Diego Clippers. The Braves and Clippers were the same franchise, now known as the Los Angeles Clippers.

Throughout his NBA career, Heard had a reputation as a fine defensive forward and rebounder, and as someone who played his best in the most demanding circumstances. Heard was traded to the 1975–76 Phoenix Suns with 36 games left in their season. The Suns had a 19–27 win-loss record at the time, but after Heard joined the Suns the team went 23–13 to reach the 1976 NBA playoffs. The Suns won their first two playoff series before losing to the Boston Celtics in the 1976 NBA Finals. Heard is best known for a buzzer beater he made with one second left in the second overtime period of Game 5 to send that game into a third overtime. Heard's feat is commonly known as "The Shot", or "The Shot Heard 'Round the World", and is the most memorable moment in a game that has been considered among the greatest games in NBA history.

After retiring as a player, Heard served as a head coach for the Dallas Mavericks and Washington Wizards. He was an assistant coach for the Dallas Mavericks, Indiana Pacers, Philadelphia 76ers, Detroit Pistons, and Atlanta Hawks.

== Early life ==
Heard was born on May 3, 1948, in Hogansville, Georgia. He attended Ethel W. Kight High School in LaGrange, Georgia. He played high school basketball, averaging 29 points and 32 rebounds per game as a senior (1965–66).

== College career ==
Heard received 60 college scholarship offers. Heard chose to attend the University of Oklahoma (OU), over the University of Southern Illinois. Heard played for OU's varsity team under head coach John MacLeod for three seasons (1967 to 1970), in the Big Eight Conference. MacLeod would later coach Heard as an NBA player and Heard would serve as an assistant coach under MacLeod.

As a sophomore (1967–68), Heard averaged 11.9 points and 9.6 rebounds per game. He was fifth in the Big Eight in rebounding that season. As a junior, Heard led OU in both scoring (13.2 points per game) and rebounding (9.7 rebounds per game). He was again fifth in the Big Eight in rebounding and ninth in scoring average. Among his Oklahoma teammates that year was future NBA center, and Heard NBA teammate, Clifford Ray.

As a senior (1969–70), Heard averaged 21.8 points and 12.5 rebounds per game; again leading OU in both categories. He was second in the Big Eight in scoring and third in rebounding. He played in 27 games that season, setting a school record with 21 double-doubles in a season that stood for almost 40 years. Heard's record was finally broken by Blake Griffin on February 14, 2009. He was selected first-team All-Big Eight for the 1969–70 season by both the Associated Press and United Press International.

At the time Heard graduated, he was the Sooners' all-time leading rebounder and second-leading scorer. The school has described him as "OU's first true superstar".

== Professional career ==
Heard was selected by the Seattle SuperSonics (now the Oklahoma City Thunder) in the third round of the 1970 NBA draft, 40th overall. Throughout his NBA career, Heard would have a reputation as a fine defensive forward and rebounder. As an NBA player, Heard's level of play rose in important situations. Heard's college and NBA coach John MacLeod said of Heard "'the tougher and stickier it got . . . the better he played'".

=== Seattle SuperSonics, Chicago Bulls, and Buffalo Braves ===
Heard played his first two seasons in Seattle as a reserve power forward. He averaged 15.8 minutes, 5.9 points, and five rebounds per game as a rookie. The following season (1971–72), Heard averaged 25.8 minutes, 7.9 points, and 7.6 rebounds per game.

In October 1972, three games into the 1972–73 season, the SuperSonics traded Heard and a third round draft pick to the Chicago Bulls for Kenny McIntosh. In December 1972, Los Angeles Lakers' head coach Bill Sharman said "'That deal for Heard with Seattle has to be the steal of the year. When he plays against us, he sure makes our team stand up and take notice'". Primarily playing as a reserve power forward behind Bob Love, Heard played in 78 games for the Bulls that season averaging nearly 20 minutes, 10.3 points, and 5.7 rebounds per game.

In a mid-November game against the Baltimore Bullets, starting in place of the injured Bulls' small forward Chet Walker, Heard had 31 points and 13 rebounds. After an early December 1972 game where Heard started in place of Love and scored 24 points and had 15 rebounds, Bulls coach Dick Motta called Heard "'probably the most amazing player I've ever had'"; and said "'for the first time since I've been on this club I've got a forward who can rebound'". Motta was impressed by Heard's strength, quickness, and agility. Heard was later described as an able offensive rebounder because of his timing and alertness.

Prior to the 1973–74 NBA season, Heard and Kevin Kunnert were traded from the Bulls to the Buffalo Braves for John Hummer, a 1974 NBA draft second round draft pick and a 1975 NBA draft second round pick. The deal was part of the drafting and trade resume that earned Braves general manager Eddie Donovan, who had constructed the championship New York Knicks teams of the early 1970s, the NBA Executive of the Year Award.

In 1973–74, Heard became the Braves' starting power forward. In a late December 1973 game against the Boston Celtics, Heard had a career-high 36 points, and 17 rebounds. In a mid-March 1974 game against the Phoenix Suns he had 25 points and 25 rebounds. This was Heard's best season in the NBA, averaging career highs with 35.7 minutes per game, 15.3 points per game, 11.7 rebounds per game, and 2.8 blocked shots per game. Heard ranked in the NBA top ten in rebounds (10th) and blocked shots (sixth) that season.

At the end of the 1973–74 regular season, Heard was described as very confident and probably making the most clutch plays of any Braves' player that season. The Braves lost to the Boston Celtics in the 1974 Eastern Conference semifinals, in six games. Heard averaged 40 minutes, 16.8 points, and a team-leading 14.7 rebounds per game. Heard had 22 points and 10 rebounds in the Suns' Game 2 win; and 20 points, 15 rebounds, and six blocked shots in a Game 6 two-point loss.

Heard was the Braves' starting power forward again in the 1974–75 season. He averaged 32.1 minutes, 11.1 points, and 9.9 rebounds per game. The Braves lost the 1975 Eastern Conference semifinals to the Washington Bullets in seven games. Heard averaged 35.7 minutes, 11.7 points, 10.9 rebounds, and 2.6 assists per game in that series. Braves general manager Eddie Donovan, who had traded for Heard, returned to the Knicks in April 1975. Heard began the 1975–76 season as the Braves' starting power forward again. He played in 50 games for the Braves that season, averaging 30.5 minutes, 9.9 points, and 10.2 rebounds per game.

=== Phoenix Suns ===
On February 1, 1976, Heard was traded along with a second round pick to the Phoenix Suns for John Shumate. The Suns' coach in 1976 was John MacLeod, who had coached Heard for three years at Oklahoma. The 1975–76 Phoenix team had a large number of strong offensive players, but defense was a problem. In Buffalo, the team lacked in offensive capability and became interested in Shumate, offering Heard in a trade. Heard went on to play 36 games for the Suns that season; playing in a total of 86 games in the NBA's 82-game season. This is the third most games played in an NBA regular season behind Walt Bellamy (88) and Tom Henderson (87); and tying McCoy McLemore (86).

Heard became the Suns' starting power forward, replacing Shumate, who had been the Suns' most popular player among Phoenix fans. In Heard's first game with the Suns he played 40 minutes, with 17 points, 13 rebounds, five assists, two steals and two blocked shots; and the Suns defeated the defending NBA champion Golden State Warriors. During his 36 regular season games with the Suns that season, Heard averaged 12.4 points, 9.8 rebounds, 1.4 steals, and 1.1 blocks per game, with a 45.2 field goal percentage.

Before the trade for Heard, the Suns had a 19–27 (.413) record and had trouble keeping opposing teams under 100 points per game. After acquiring Heard the team had a 23–13 (.639) record. The Suns finished the season 42–40, and made the playoffs. Heard was considered the primary cause for the Suns' dramatic improvement during the season.

The Suns defeated Seattle in the first round of the 1976 Western Conference playoffs (four games to two), and then defeated the defending NBA champion Warriors in the Western Conference Finals in seven games. Golden State had a 59–23 regular season record. Arizona sports editor Verne Boatner wrote at the time "Every time the youthful Suns seemed ready to fold under the intense playoff pressure, Gar's overpowering determination turned the tide".

Heard started all six games in the first round against Seattle, averaging 15.3 points, 9.3 rebounds, 2.2 steals, and two blocks per game. He likewise started all seven games against the Warriors, averaging 13.1 points, 12.1 rebounds, 2.3 steals, and 2.1 blocks per game. In the Suns' double overtime Game 4 win against the Warriors, Heard played a team-leading 52 minutes and further led the Suns with 22 points and 18 rebounds, including 10 offensive rebounds. With a one-point lead (105–104) and faced with elimination in Game 6, Heard blocked Jamal Wilkes's shot attempt in the game's final seconds, and then grabbed the ball to preserve the Suns' win.

The Suns played the Boston Celtics in the 1976 NBA finals, losing the series in six games. Heard played more minutes than any other Sun during the six-game series (40.0 per game), and averaged 13.5 points, 9.3 rebounds, 1.7 steals, and 1.7 blocks per game. He played 61 of a possible 63 minutes in the triple overtime Game 5 of that series, setting an NBA record for minutes played at the time. He also made a game-tying shot during the second overtime of that game, which has become one of the most famous plays in NBA history.

==== The Shot ====
Game 5 of the 1976 NBA Finals between the Suns and Celtics, played on June 4, 1976, is often rated as the greatest, or one of the greatest, NBA finals game in history. The Celtics won the game 128–126 in triple-overtime. It is the end of the second overtime period, including an extraordinary shot from Heard with one second left in the period, that has been the object of particular focus.

With four or five seconds left in double overtime, after a steal by the Suns' Paul Westphal, the Suns took a 110–109 lead. Future Celtic Hall of Famer John Havlicek raced down the floor and made a running 15-foot one-handed shot with two seconds remaining, giving Boston a one-point advantage (111–110). The Celtics' timekeeper then ran the game clock out to no time remaining, instead of stopping the game clock after a made basket per league rules. The Boston Garden crowd erupted, believing the game was over. The Celtics immediately went to the locker room. Celtic forward Don Nelson later explained that former Celtic coach and then Celtic executive Red Auerbach had trained Celtics teams to go to the locker room in these kinds of situations to put pressure on the officials by making it difficult to call the Celtics back out to the court. As Nelson later stated about Game 5, "'We didn't think they'd have the guts to bring us back out, but they did'". Legend has it that Havlicek had actually taken the tape off his ankles by this stage.

But the Suns correctly pointed out that there was still time left in the game after Havlicek's made field goal. Celtics fans had stormed the court after the time was erroneously allowed to expire, and one particularly boisterous fan attacked referee Richie Powers after it was announced that the game was not over yet. The officials only placed one second back on the game clock instead of two, on the logic that if Havlicek let the ball go with two seconds left, it would have taken one second to reach the basket. Suns guard Paul Westphal then intentionally took a technical foul by calling a timeout when the Suns had no more timeouts to use. This gave the Celtics a free throw, which Jo Jo White converted to give Boston a two-point edge, but the timeout also allowed Phoenix to inbound from mid-court instead of from under their own basket. When play resumed, Heard caught the inbound pass and fired a very high-arching turnaround jump shot from at least 18 to 20 feet away over Celtic defender Don Nelson. It swished through, sending the game into a third overtime. However, Boston eventually won the game and the Finals, four games to two. Heard had scored 17 points and grabbed 12 rebounds in Game 5.

Heard's field goal to end the second overtime is commonly known as "The Shot", or "The Shot Heard 'Round the World" (likely in reference to Ralph Waldo Emerson's poem "Concord Hymn", which was written about the Battle of Lexington; and as a pun on Heard's name). It has been considered one of the greatest sports moments of the 20th Century. Earlier in his career, Heard was known to favor the turnaround jump shot and that he had a high arc on his jump shots.

A revision to Rule 12-A, Section I, of the NBA's rules in regards to excessive timeouts, resulted in the elimination of the advancement of the ball following an excessive timeout. The rule has since been changed to award the ball to the team shooting the technical free throw.

Heard went on to play four more seasons for the Suns (1976 to 1980), with the Suns advancing to the Western Conference playoffs three times during that period. He missed playing time during the 1976–77 season with knee tendon problems. He only played in 46 games during the regular season, averaging 29.6 minutes, 9.7 points, 9.6 rebounds, 1.9 assists, 1.2 blocks, and 1.2 steals per game. The next season (1977–78), Heard played in 80 games, averaging 26.2, 7.8 points, 8.2 rebounds, 1.7 assists, 1.6 steals, and 1.3 blocks per game. He started both games in the Suns' first round 1978 NBA playoffs series loss to the Milwaukee Bucks.

The 1978–79 Suns were 50–32, and reached the Western Conference finals where they lost to the SuperSonics in seven games. Heard played in only 63 games during the regular season, averaging less than 20 minutes, 6.3 points, and 5.6 rebounds per game. He had issues with his back that season, and missed games. In the Western Conference semifinals against the Kansas City Kings, Heard started all five games, and averaged 22.4 minutes, 8.8 points, and nine rebounds per game. In the Western Conference finals against the SuperSonics, he started only one game and averaged 18.6 minutes, 3.3 points, and 5.1 rebounds per game.

In his final season with the Suns (1979–80), Heard played in all 82 games as a reserve behind starting power forward Leonard "Truck" Robinson. Heard averaged 17.1 minutes, five points and 4.6 rebounds per game that season. He was the Suns' team captain. After Robinson was injured in the first round of the 1980 NBA playoffs, Heard started every game in the Suns' five-game 1980 Western Conference semifinals loss to the Los Angeles Lakers. Heard averaged 32 minutes, 7.6 points, 8.0 rebounds, 1.8 assists, 1.8 steals, and 1.6 blocks per game against the Lakers.

Heard had played out his option after the 1979–80 season and was a free agent. He wanted to play for the Suns again in 1980–81, and was seeking a guaranteed contract, which the Suns refused. In addition, the Suns' offered Heard a salary 50 percent lower than what he was paid in 1979–80. Mainly for this later reason, Heard refused to report to the Suns' training camp.

Over his career with the Suns, Heard led the team in rebounding twice. He played in 307 games for the Suns, averaging 23.8 minutes, 7.5 points, 7.1 rebounds, 1.4 assists, 1.2 steals, and one block per game. In 44 playoff games with the Suns, Heard averaged 30.1 minutes, 9.4 points, 8.4 rebounds, 1.4 assists, 1.4 steals, and 1.8 blocks per game.

=== San Diego Clippers ===
Heard signed as a free agent with the San Diego Clippers in mid-October 1980. This was the same franchise with which he played when the team was in Buffalo. In his final NBA season, Heard played in 78 games for the Clippers averaging nearly 21 minutes per game; and 4.8 points, 4.5 rebounds, 0.9 blocks, and 1.6 assists per game.

Over his 11-year NBA career, Heard averaged 24.9 minutes, 8.7 points, 7.5 rebounds, 1.6 assists, 1.3 blocks, and 1.3 steals per game over 787 regular season games. He averaged 12.8 points and 10.6 rebounds per 36 minutes. In 59 playoff games, Heard averaged 30.9 minutes, 10.2 points, 9.1 rebounds, 1.6 assists, 1.4 steals and 1.7 blocks per game.

== Coaching ==
Heard was an assistant coach with the Dallas Mavericks for five years (1987-92); first under John MacLeod (Heard's coach at Oklahoma and with the Suns) and then Richie Adubato, who replaced MacLeod early in the 1989–90 season. MacLeod originally wanted to hire Heard because he believed Heard would make a good coach, stating "'He was a great team leader when he played for me. When it was necessary, he would call a meeting himself. With his ability to communicate and lead, we're going to be better because of him'". When Heard began coaching for the Mavericks in 1987, he said "'I've been through a lot of playoffs. And that's the most important part of the season and it takes a certain mentality. That's where I feel I can really help this organization'".

Heard began the 1992–93 season as an assistant coach under Adubato, but served as the Mavericks' interim head coach through the end of the season after Adubato was fired in January 1993. Heard next served as an assistant coach for the Indiana Pacers (1993 to 1997) under Larry Brown, the Philadelphia 76ers (1997–98) under Larry Brown, and the Detroit Pistons (1998–99) under Alvin Gentry.

Heard began the 1999–2000 season as head coach of the Washington Wizards, coaching 44 games until he was fired in January 2000 by the team's new president, Michael Jordan. The firing was controversial, with Chicago sportswriter Skip Bayless saying "Heard is pure class as a man and highly respected by the NBA's most respected coaches". He joined the Dallas Mavericks as an assistant coach for the remainder of the season, under head coach Don Nelson (over whom Heard had taken "the Shot" in the 1976 NBA finals). The Washington job was his last as a head coach. His overall head coaching record is 23–74.

From 2000 to 2003, he was an assistant coach with the Atlanta Hawks under Lon Kruger. During the 2004–2005 season, he joined Larry Brown's staff for the third time, as an assistant coach with the Detroit Pistons. He served as head coach in several games that season when Brown was out due to a medical condition. The Pistons went on to the NBA Finals that year, losing to the San Antonio Spurs in seven games.

== Personal life ==
Heard worked in real estate and owned a video game parlor in Phoenix after retiring as an NBA player. He volunteered as an assistant coach at Arizona State University, before being hired by MacLeod as an assistant coach in 1987.

== Career statistics ==
Legend
GP	Games played	GS	Games started	MPG	Minutes per game
FG%	Field goal percentage	3P%	3-point field goal percentage	FT%	Free throw percentage
RPG	Rebounds per game	APG	Assists per game	SPG	Steals per game
BPG	Blocks per game	PPG	Points per game	**Bold**	Career high
*	Led the league

=== NBA ===
==== Regular season ====
Year	Team	GP	GS	MPG	FG%	3P%	FT%	RPG	APG	SPG	BPG	PPG
1970–71	Seattle	65		15.8	.381		.656	5.0	.7			5.9
1971–72	Seattle	58		25.8	.401		.617	7.6	.9			7.9
1972–73	Seattle	3		5.7	.444		**1.000**	2.0	.7			3.0
1972–73	Chicago	78	**9**	19.7	.425		.650	5.7	.7			10.3
1973–74	Buffalo	**81**		**35.7**	.435		.650	**11.7**	2.2	**1.7**	**2.8**	**15.3**
1974–75	Buffalo	67		32.1	.388		.564	9.9	**2.8**	1.6	1.8	11.1
1975–76	Buffalo	**50***		30.5	.421		.607	10.2	2.5	1.3	1.1	9.9
1975–76	Phoenix	**36***		33.9	**.452**		.673	9.9	1.8	1.4	1.1	12.4
1976–77	Phoenix	46		29.6	.379		.725	9.6	1.9	1.2	1.2	9.7
1977–78	Phoenix	80		26.2	.424		.612	8.2	1.7	1.6	1.3	7.8
1978–79	Phoenix	63		19.3	.441		.689	5.6	1.0	.8	.9	6.3
1979–80	Phoenix	82		17.1	.417	.000	.744	4.6	1.2	1.0	.6	5.0
1980–81	San Diego	78		20.9	.376	.000	.782	4.5	1.6	1.3	.9	4.8
Career		787	9	24.9	.414	.000	.654	7.5	1.6	1.3	1.3	8.7

==== Playoffs ====
Year	Team	GP	MPG	FG%	3P%	FT%	RPG	APG	SPG	BPG	PPG
1973	Chicago	2	4.5	**.500**		–	1.5	.0			2.0
1974	Buffalo	6	**40.0**	.457		.708	**14.7**	2.5	1.5	**2.0**	**16.8**
1975	Buffalo	7	35.7	.396		.429	10.9	**2.6**	1.3	1.1	11.7
1976	Phoenix	**19***	37.9	.441		.679	10.4	1.7	**2.1**	1.9	13.9
1978	Phoenix	2	31.0	.353		.500	8.0	2.5	1.0	**2.0**	6.5
1979	Phoenix	15	21.3	.372		.600	7.1	.9	.8	1.7	5.5
1980	Phoenix	8	27.9	.393	–	**.733**	6.4	1.5	1.1	1.4	6.9
Career		59	30.9	.419	–	.651	9.1	1.6	1.4	1.7	10.2

== Head coaching record ==
Legend
Regular season	G	Games coached	W	Games won	L	Games lost	W–L %	Win–loss %
Playoffs	PG	Playoff games	PW	Playoff wins	PL	Playoff losses	PW–L %	Playoff win–loss %

Team	Year	G	W	L	W–L%	Finish	PG	PW	PL	PW–L%	Result
Dallas	1992–93	53	9	44	.170	6th in Midwest	—	—	—	—	Missed Playoffs
Washington	1999–00	44	14	30	.318	(fired)	—	—	—	—	
Career		97	23	74	.237		—	—	—	—	
