= Tom Boswell (basketball) =

American basketball player (born 1953)

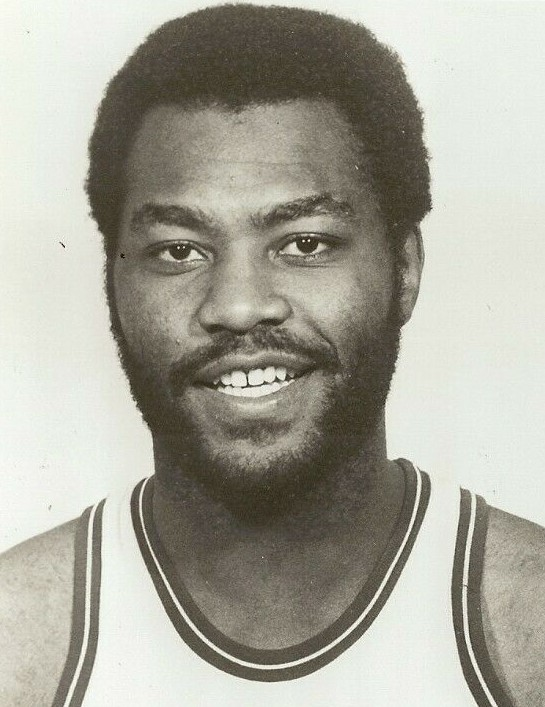

Personal information
- Born: October 2, 1953 (age 73) Montgomery, Alabama, U.S.
- Listed height: 6 ft 9 in (2.06 m)
- Listed weight: 220 lb (100 kg)

Career information
- High school: George Washington Carver (Montgomery, Alabama)
- College: South Carolina State (1971–1973); South Carolina (1974–1975)
- NBA draft: 1975: 1st round, 17th overall pick
- Drafted by: Boston Celtics
- Position: Power forward / center
- Number: 31, 41, 33

Career history
- 1975–1978: Boston Celtics
- 1978–1979: Denver Nuggets
- 1979–1980: Utah Jazz
- 1980–1981: Squibb Cantù
- 1983–1984: Utah Jazz
- 1984–1985: Wisconsin Flyers

Career highlights
- NBA champion (1976); Italian League champion (1981); FIBA Saporta Cup champion (1981)
- Stats at NBA.com
- Stats at Basketball Reference
Medals
Representing United States
Men's basketball
FIBA World Championship
Bronze medal – third place	1974 Puerto Rico	Team competition

Tommy G. Boswell (born October 2, 1953) is an American former professional basketball player.

A 6-foot-9-inch (2.06 m) forward/center from the University of South Carolina, Boswell played six seasons (1975–1980;1983–1984) in the National Basketball Association as a member of the Boston Celtics, Denver Nuggets, and Utah Jazz. He averaged 7.7 points per game in his NBA career and won an NBA Championship with Boston in 1976.

He played for the U.S. men's national basketball team in the 1974 FIBA World Championship, winning the bronze medal.

== Career statistics ==
Legend
GP	Games played	GS	Games started	MPG	Minutes per game
FG%	Field goal percentage	3P%	3-point field goal percentage	FT%	Free throw percentage
RPG	Rebounds per game	APG	Assists per game	SPG	Steals per game
BPG	Blocks per game	PPG	Points per game	**Bold**	Career high
†	Won an NBA championship

=== NBA ===
==== Regular season ====
Year	Team	GP	GS	MPG	FG%	3P%	FT%	RPG	APG	SPG	BPG	PPG
1975–76†	Boston	35		7.9	.441		.583	2.0	.5	.1	.0	2.7
1976–77	Boston	70		15.5	.515		.711	4.4	1.2	.4	.1	6.4
1977–78	Boston	65		17.7	.518		.756	4.4	1.1	.7	.2	7.1
1978–79	Denver	**79**		27.9	.532		.697	**6.8**	**3.1**	**.6**	**.6**	10.6
1979–80	Denver	18		**29.0**	.533	.500	**.829**	6.3	2.6	.3	.4	11.3
1979–80	Utah	61		25.5	**.573**	.500	.729	5.4	1.9	.4	.5	**11.5**
1983–84	Utah	38	0	6.9	.538	**1.000**	.762	1.7	.4	.2	.0	1.9
Career		366	0	19.3	.533	.545	.724	4.7	1.6	.4	.3	7.7

==== Playoffs ====
Year	Team	GP	MPG	FG%	3P%	FT%	RPG	APG	SPG	BPG	PPG
1976†	Boston	3	1.0	.500		–	.3	.0	.0	.0	.7
1977	Boston	**9**	9.0	.444		.667	2.2	.8	.1	.0	2.2
1979	Denver	3	**40.0**	.600		**.769**	**9.0**	**5.3**	**1.0**	**1.7**	**17.3**
1984	Utah	5	11.0	**.750**	–	.400	1.2	.4	.0	.2	1.6
Career		20	13.0	.559	–	.667	2.7	1.3	.2	.3	4.1
