= Bob Carrington =

American basketball player (born 1953)

Personal information
- Born: July 3, 1953 (age 73) Brookline, Massachusetts, U.S.
- Listed height: 6 ft 6 in (1.98 m)
- Listed weight: 195 lb (88 kg)

Career information
- High school: Archbishop Williams (Braintree, Massachusetts)
- College: Boston College (1972–1976)
- NBA draft: 1976: 2nd round, 28th overall pick
- Drafted by: Atlanta Hawks
- Playing career: 1977–1979
- Position: Shooting guard / small forward
- Number: 16, 30

Career history
- 1977–1978: New Jersey Nets
- 1978: Indiana Pacers
- 1978: Jersey Shore Bullets
- 1978–1979: Tucson Gunners
- 1979: San Diego Clippers
- Stats at NBA.com
- Stats at Basketball Reference

Robert Frederick Carrington (born July 3, 1953) is an American former professional basketball player. He was a 6-foot-6-inch (198 cm) 195 pounds (88 kg) swingman and played collegiately at Boston College.

Carrington was selected with the 11th pick of the second round in the 1976 NBA draft by the Atlanta Hawks. He played for three teams (including the Indiana Pacers and New Jersey Nets) in 2 years, his final season spent with the San Diego Clippers in 1979–80. He also played in the Western Basketball Association.

== Career statistics ==
Legend
| GP | Games played | GS | Games started | MPG | Minutes per game |
| FG% | Field goal percentage | 3P% | 3-point field goal percentage | FT% | Free throw percentage |
| RPG | Rebounds per game | APG | Assists per game | SPG | Steals per game |
| BPG | Blocks per game | PPG | Points per game | **Bold** | Career high |

=== NBA ===
==== Regular season ====
| Year | Team | GP | GS | MPG | FG% | 3P% | FT% | RPG | APG | SPG | BPG | PPG |
|---|---|---|---|---|---|---|---|---|---|---|---|---|
| 1977–78 | New Jersey | **37** | | **27.9** | .491 | | .742 | **3.0** | 1.5 | **1.2** | **.3** | **10.4** |
| 1977–78 | Indiana | 35 | 1 | 17.7 | **.487** | | **.784** | 1.8 | **1.8** | .6 | **.3** | 7.1 |
| 1979–80 | San Diego | 10 | | 13.4 | .405 | .000 | .750 | 1.3 | .3 | .4 | .1 | 3.6 |
| Career | | 82 | 1 | 21.8 | .428 | .000 | .760 | 2.3 | 1.5 | .8 | .3 | 8.2 |
