= Pat Cummings =

American basketball player (1956–2012)

Personal information
- Born: July 11, 1956 Johnstown, Pennsylvania, U.S.
- Died: June 26, 2012 (aged 55) New York City, New York, U.S.
- Listed height: 6 ft 9 in (2.06 m)
- Listed weight: 230 lb (104 kg)

Career information
- High school: Johnstown (Johnstown, Pennsylvania)
- College: Cincinnati (1974–1979)
- NBA draft: 1978: 3rd round, 59th overall pick
- Drafted by: Milwaukee Bucks
- Playing career: 1979–1993
- Position: Power forward / center
- Number: 6, 42, 50

Career history
- 1979–1982: Milwaukee Bucks
- 1982–1984: Dallas Mavericks
- 1984–1988: New York Knicks
- 1988–1990: Miami Heat
- 1990: CB Zaragoza
- 1990: Ranger Varese
- 1990–1991: Utah Jazz
- 1992–1993: Rapid City Thrillers
- 1993: Fort Wayne Fury
- 1993: Wichita Falls Texans

Career highlights
- Metro Conference Player of the Year (1979); 2× First-team All-Metro Conference (1978, 1979)

Career NBA statistics
- Points: 6,529 (9.6 ppg)
- Rebounds: 3,825 (5.6 rpg)
- Assists: 807 (1.2 apg)
- Stats at NBA.com
- Stats at Basketball Reference

Pat Cummings (July 11, 1956 – June 26, 2012) was an American professional basketball player.

A 6-foot-9 forward with an accurate shooting touch, Cummings spent the most productive stretch of his 12-year career with the New York Knicks and the Dallas Mavericks of the National Basketball Association (NBA), averaging better than 12 points and eight rebounds for four straight seasons.

== High school career ==
The son of Charles and Dolores (Gresik) Cummings, he scored 1,136 career points for Greater Johnstown High School of Johnstown, Pennsylvania. He led the team to a pair of District 6 Class A championships, including a 25–1 record his senior year. He earned first-team all-state honors.

Cummings set a school single-game scoring record with 50 points while averaging 24.3 points per game and 12 rebounds as a senior.

== College career ==
Cummings committed to attend the University of Cincinnati, coached by Gale Catlett. Cummings still holds the Bearcats' single-season field goal percentage record (.642 in 1977–78) and his career mark of .581 is second to Kenyon Martin. He is second all-time in field goals made (756) behind Oscar Robertson. In 1978–79, he averaged 24.6 points per game, fifth-highest in Bearcats' history, while also averaging a team-leading 11.3 rebounds and .823 free throw percentage. His career point total of 1,762 was second all-time to Robertson, and that total currently ranks fifth.

At UC, Cummings' teams went 23–6 (1974–75), 25–6 (1975–76), 17–10 (1977–78), and 13–14 (1978–79). He did not play in 1976–77 due to a broken leg. He earned All-Metro Conference first team and was the Bearcats' MVP in 1977–78 and 1978–79. He was awarded the 1978–79 Metro Conference Player of the Year. Cummings was inducted into the James P. Kelly UC Athletics Hall of Fame in 1990.

== NBA career ==
=== Milwaukee Bucks ===
Cummings was drafted by the Milwaukee Bucks as a junior-eligible in 1978 (the year Boston Celtics used the same rule to draft Larry Bird). After playing out his senior season, Cummings came to the Bucks in 1979. He saw his first NBA action in the Bucks' second game, a 125–96 win over the Denver Nuggets in which he scored four points, followed by eight points in the Bucks' next game, a 131–107 win over the Utah Jazz. He did shine at times, with a then career-high 25 points on February 26, 1980, against the Los Angeles Clippers, then 30 in the third-to-last game of the season against the Denver Nuggets.

Over the next three seasons, he saw limited action in a front court that included Bob Lanier, Dave Meyers, Marques Johnson, Kent Benson, and Harvey Catchings. Nevertheless, Cummings shot over 50 percent from the floor and over 70 percent from the free throw line and averaged more than six points each year. On March 9, 1981, he tied his career single-game best of 30 points against the Cleveland Cavaliers.

=== Dallas Mavericks ===
In 1982 the two-year-old Dallas Mavericks acquired him for a pair of draft choices. Cummings became the Mavs' starting center and averaged 12.5 points and 8.2 rebounds with 20 or more points in 10 games. After putting up similar numbers the following season, including 12 games of 20 or more points, plus back-to-back 16-point games in the playoffs against the Seattle SuperSonics,

=== New York Knicks ===
Cummings signed with New York as a free agent. In 1984–85 with the Knicks, Cummings notched the best scoring average of his career, 15.8 points per game. He not only had 23 games of 20+ points, he scored a career-high 32 points on January 28, 1985, against the Clippers, followed two nights later by a new career-high of 34 against the Phoenix Suns.

In 1985–86, he finally succumbed to the foot problems that had been nagging him for years. After averaging 15.7 points and 9.0 rebounds in 31 games, including tying his career-high 34 points on November 22, 1985, against the Washington Bullets, Cummings bowed out for the season and had surgery to remove bone spurs from his right ankle. Cummings never quite returned to form. He spent two more seasons with the Knicks, sharing time in the front court with Bill Cartwright and Patrick Ewing.

=== Miami Heat ===
Cummings signing as a free agent with the expansion Miami Heat in 1988. He started in the Heat's first-ever game, and spent most of his two years in Miami as a backup to Rony Seikaly. On Dec. 14, 1988, Cummings scored 15 points to help lead the Heat past the Los Angeles Clippers, 89–88, for their first victory, after they opened the season with a then-N.B.A. record 17 consecutive losses. Cummings was waived late in the 1989–90 campaign.

=== Italy/Utah Jazz ===
After playing professionally in Italy in 1990–91, he played a four-game stint with the Utah Jazz in 1990–91. Cummings was waived and out of the NBA at age 34.

== Career statistics ==
Legend
GP	Games played	GS	Games started	MPG	Minutes per game
FG%	Field goal percentage	3P%	3-point field goal percentage	FT%	Free throw percentage
RPG	Rebounds per game	APG	Assists per game	SPG	Steals per game
BPG	Blocks per game	PPG	Points per game	**Bold**	Career high

=== NBA ===
==== Regular season ====
Year	Team	GP	GS	MPG	FG%	3P%	FT%	RPG	APG	SPG	BPG	PPG
1979–80	Milwaukee	71		12.7	.505	–	.764	3.4	0.7	0.3	0.2	6.6
1980–81	Milwaukee	74		14.6	.539	.000	.707	3.9	0.8	0.4	0.3	8.0
1981–82	Milwaukee	78	7	14.5	.509	.000	.736	3.1	1.3	0.3	0.1	6.5
1982–83	Dallas	**81**	71	28.6	.493	.000	.755	8.2	1.8	0.7	**0.4**	12.5
1983–84	Dallas	80	**80**	31.2	.494	.000	.742	8.2	**2.0**	0.8	0.3	13.1
1984–85	New York	63	63	**32.8**	.514	.000	**.780**	8.2	1.7	0.8	0.3	**15.8**
1985–86	New York	31	30	32.5	.478	.000	.698	**9.0**	1.5	**0.9**	**0.4**	15.7
1986–87	New York	49	11	21.6	.450	–	.718	6.4	0.8	0.5	0.1	8.6
1987–88	New York	62	9	15.3	.456	.000	.738	3.8	0.6	0.3	0.2	5.5
1988–89	Miami	53	28	20.7	.500	.000	.742	5.3	0.9	0.5	0.3	8.8
1989–90	Miami	37	1	10.6	.484	–	.568	2.5	0.4	0.3	0.1	4.7
1990–91	Utah	4	0	6.5	**.667**	–	.700	1.3	0.0	0.0	0.0	3.8
Career		683	300	21.3	.497	.000	.737	5.6	1.2	0.5	0.3	9.6

==== Playoffs ====
Year	Team	GP	GS	MPG	FG%	3P%	FT%	RPG	APG	SPG	BPG	PPG
1980	Milwaukee	6		9.5	**.647**	–	.833	2.7	0.3	0.2	0.0	4.5
1981	Milwaukee	5		5.0	.273	–	.750	1.2	0.0	0.2	0.0	1.8
1982	Milwaukee	6		7.3	.364	–	.500	1.8	0.3	0.0	**0.3**	1.5
1984	Dallas	**10**		**30.0**	.409	–	**.933**	**7.2**	**1.5**	**0.4**	0.2	**10.8**
1988	New York	3	0	9.3	.400	–	.750	2.3	1.0	0.0	0.0	2.3
Career		30	0	15.1	.421	–	.839	3.7	0.7	0.2	0.1	5.3

== After basketball ==
Cummings had resided in Loveland, Ohio, a suburb of Cincinnati, earned his real estate license and spent several years in the real estate business.

He died of a heart attack in his Greenwich Village, New York City apartment on June 26, 2012. He was preceded in death by his father and his brother, Charles Jr., and was survived by his mother and his brother, Michael. He was interred at Grandview Cemetery in Johnstown.

In a 2016 interview, Cummings' former teammate Bernard King remarked "We've lost a lot of guys over the last couple of years. Moses Malone, Darryl Dawkins, Jerome Kersey and before that Pat Cummings, just to name a few. And a lot of these guys have died of heart attacks. So I think it's great that the league, the players association and the retired players association are joining forces to try and figure out why that is and what we can do to adequately provide for everyone."
