= 1979–80 Golden State Warriors season =

NBA professional basketball team season

- Head coach: Al Attles; Johnny Bach (interim)
- General manager: Al Attles
- Owner: Franklin Mieuli
- Arena: Oakland-Alameda County Coliseum Arena

Results
- Record: 24–58 (.293)
- Place: Division: 6th (Pacific); Conference: 11th (Western)
- Playoff finish: Did not qualify
- Stats at Basketball Reference

Local media
- Television: KTVU
- Radio: KNBR

The 1979–80 Golden State Warriors season was the Warriors' 34th season in the NBA and 17th in the San Francisco Bay Area.

== Draft picks ==
Round	Pick	Player	Position	Nationality	College
2	28	Danny Salisbury		United States	Texas-Pan American
3	54	Cheese Johnson	SF	United States	Wichita State
4	75	Ron Ripley		United States	Wisconsin-Green Bay
4	82	Jerry Sichting	PG	United States	Purdue
5	96	George Lett		United States	Centenary
6	118	Jim Mitchem		United States	DePaul
7	137	Ren Watson		United States	Virginia Commonwealth
8	155	Mario Butler		Panama	Briar Cliff
9	175	Gene Ransom		United States	California
10	192	Kevin Heenan		United States	California State-Fullerton

== Roster ==
1979–80 Golden State Warriors roster
Players

Pos.	No.	Player	Height	Weight	DOB	From
PF	5	Tom Abernethy	6 ft 7 in (2.01 m)	220 lb (100 kg)	1954-05-06	Indiana
PF	43	Wayne Cooper	6 ft 10 in (2.08 m)	220 lb (100 kg)	1956-11-16	New Orleans
PF	30	Darnell Hillman	6 ft 9 in (2.06 m)	215 lb (98 kg)	1949-08-29	San José State
PG	4	John Lucas	6 ft 3 in (1.91 m)	175 lb (79 kg)	1953-10-31	Maryland
C	00	Robert Parish	7 ft 0 in (2.13 m)	230 lb (104 kg)		Centenary
SF	22	Sonny Parker	6 ft 6 in (1.98 m)	200 lb (91 kg)	1955-03-22	Texas A&M
C	44	Clifford Ray	6 ft 9 in (2.06 m)	230 lb (104 kg)	1949-01-21	Oklahoma
SF	45	Purvis Short	6 ft 7 in (2.01 m)	210 lb (95 kg)	1957-07-02	Jackson State
SG	20	Phil Smith	6 ft 4 in (1.93 m)	185 lb (84 kg)	1952-04-22	San Francisco
SG	11	Raymond Townsend	6 ft 3 in (1.91 m)	175 lb (79 kg)	1955-12-20	UCLA
PG	10	Jo Jo White	6 ft 3 in (1.91 m)	190 lb (86 kg)	1946-11-16	Kansas

Coaches
Head coach
- Al Attles
- Johnny Bach (interim)

Legend
- (DP) Unsigned draft pick
- (FA) Free agent
- (S) Suspended
- Injured

Roster
Updated: March 25, 1980

== Regular season ==
=== Season standings ===
Pacific Division	W	L	PCT	GB	Home	Road	Div
y-Los Angeles Lakers	60	22	.732	–	37–4	23–18	19–11
x-Seattle SuperSonics	56	26	.683	4	33–8	23–18	18–12
x-Phoenix Suns	55	27	.671	5	37–5	18–22	19–11
x-Portland Trail Blazers	38	44	.463	22	26–15	12–29	13–17
San Diego Clippers	35	47	.427	25	24–17	11–30	13–17
Golden State Warriors	24	58	.293	36	15–26	9–32	8–22

#	Western Conference				
#	Team	W	L	PCT	GB
1	c-Los Angeles Lakers	60	22	.732	–
2	y-Milwaukee Bucks	49	33	.598	11
3	x-Seattle SuperSonics	56	26	.683	4
4	x-Phoenix Suns	55	27	.671	5
5	x-Kansas City Kings	47	35	.573	13
6	x-Portland Trail Blazers	38	44	.463	22
7	San Diego Clippers	35	47	.427	25
8	Chicago Bulls	30	52	.366	30
9	Denver Nuggets	30	52	.366	30
10	Utah Jazz	24	58	.293	36
11	Golden State Warriors	24	58	.293	36

z - clinched division title
y - clinched division title
x - clinched playoff spot

=== Game log ===
1979-80 game log
#	Date	Opponent	Score	High points	Record
1	October 12	@ Phoenix	L 89-97	Robert Parish (19)	0–1
2	October 13	Chicago	L 96-102	Sonny Parker (20)	0–2
3	October 16	Denver	W 108-106	John Lucas (23)	1–2

== Player statistics ==
Legend
GP	Games played	GS	Games started	MPG	Minutes per game
FG%	Field-goal percentage	3P%	3-point field-goal percentage	FT%	Free-throw percentage
RPG	Rebounds per game	APG	Assists per game	SPG	Steals per game
BPG	Blocks per game	PPG	Points per game

== See also ==
- 1979-80 NBA season
