= 1979–80 Chicago Bulls season =

NBA professional basketball team season

- Head coach: Jerry Sloan
- General manager: Rod Thorn
- Owner(s): Arthur Wirtz and Jonathan Kovler
- Arena: Chicago Stadium

Results
- Record: 30–52 (.366)
- Place: Division: 3rd (Midwest); Conference: 8th (Western)
- Playoff finish: Did not qualify
- Stats at Basketball Reference

Local media
- Television: WGN-TV (Bob Costas, Johnny “Red” Kerr)
- Radio: WIND (Jim Durham, Bill Berg)

The 1979–80 Chicago Bulls season was the Bulls' 14th season in the NBA and their final season in the Western Conference.

== Draft picks ==
Round	Pick	Player	Position	Nationality	College
1	2	David Greenwood	PF/C	United States	UCLA
2	33	Lawrence Butler	SG	United States	Idaho State
3	47	Calvin Garrett	SF	United States	Oral Roberts
3	49	Cedrick Hordges		United States	South Carolina
4	72	George Maynor		United States	East Carolina
5	93	Larry Washington		United States	Drury
6	114	Steve Smith		United States	Southern California
7	133	Mike Eversley		United States	Chicago State
8	153	Tony Warren		United States	North Carolina State
9	171	James Jackson		United States	Minnesota
10	190	Marvin Thoms		United States	UCLA
10	197	Cortez Collins		United States	Southern Indiana

== Roster ==
1979-80 Chicago Bulls roster
Players

Pos.	No.	Player	Height	Weight	DOB	From
C	20	Dennis Awtrey	6 ft 10 in (2.08 m)	235 lb (107 kg)	1948–02–22	Santa Clara
G	1	Del Beshore	5 ft 11 in (1.80 m)	165 lb (75 kg)	1956–11–29	California (PA)
C	26	Coby Dietrick	6 ft 10 in (2.08 m)	220 lb (100 kg)	1948–07–23	San José State
C	53	Artis Gilmore	7 ft 2 in (2.18 m)	240 lb (109 kg)	1949–09–21	Jacksonville
F	34	David Greenwood	6 ft 9 in (2.06 m)	222 lb (101 kg)	1957–05–27	UCLA
F	27	Ollie Johnson	6 ft 6 in (1.98 m)	200 lb (91 kg)	1949–05–11	Temple
F	13	Dwight Jones	6 ft 10 in (2.08 m)	210 lb (95 kg)	1952–02–27	Houston
G	23	Ollie Mack	6 ft 3 in (1.91 m)	185 lb (84 kg)	1957–06–06	East Carolina
F	17	Scott May	6 ft 7 in (2.01 m)	215 lb (98 kg)	1954–03–19	Indiana
G	15	John Mengelt	6 ft 2 in (1.88 m)	195 lb (88 kg)	1949–10–16	Auburn
G	40	Ricky Sobers	6 ft 3 in (1.91 m)	198 lb (90 kg)	1953–01–15	UNLV
G	24	Reggie Theus	6 ft 7 in (2.01 m)	190 lb (86 kg)	1957–10–13	UNLV

Coaches
Head coach
- Jerry Sloan
Assistant(s)
- Phil Johnson

Legend
- (DP) Unsigned draft pick
- (FA) Free agent
- (S) Suspended
- Injured

Roster
Updated: February 13, 1980

== Regular season ==
=== Season standings ===
Midwest Division	W	L	PCT	GB	Home	Road	Div
y-Milwaukee Bucks	49	33	.598	–	28–12	21–21	15–9
x-Kansas City Kings	47	35	.573	2	30–11	17–24	18–6
Chicago Bulls	30	52	.366	19	21–20	9–32	8–16
Denver Nuggets	30	52	.366	19	24–17	6–35	10–14
Utah Jazz	24	58	.293	25	17–24	7–34	9–15

#	Western Conference				
#	Team	W	L	PCT	GB
1	c-Los Angeles Lakers	60	22	.732	–
2	y-Milwaukee Bucks	49	33	.598	11
3	x-Seattle SuperSonics	56	26	.683	4
4	x-Phoenix Suns	55	27	.671	5
5	x-Kansas City Kings	47	35	.573	13
6	x-Portland Trail Blazers	38	44	.463	22
7	San Diego Clippers	35	47	.427	25
8	Chicago Bulls	30	52	.366	30
9	Denver Nuggets	30	52	.366	30
10	Utah Jazz	24	58	.293	36
11	Golden State Warriors	24	58	.293	36

z - clinched division title
y - clinched division title
x - clinched playoff spot

=== Game log ===
1979–80 game log
Total: 30–52 (home: 21–20; road: 9–32)
October: 0–0 (home: 0–0; road: 0–0)

Game	Date	Team	Score	High points	High rebounds	High assists	Location Attendance	Record

November : 0–0 (home: 0–0; road: 0–0)

Game	Date	Team	Score	High points	High rebounds	High assists	Location Attendance	Record

December : 0–0 (home: 0–0; road: 0–0)

Game	Date	Team	Score	High points	High rebounds	High assists	Location Attendance	Record

January : 0–0 (home: 0–0; road: 0–0)

Game	Date	Team	Score	High points	High rebounds	High assists	Location Attendance	Record

February : 0–0 (home: 0–0; road: 0–0)

Game	Date	Team	Score	High points	High rebounds	High assists	Location Attendance	Record

March : 0–0 (home: 0–0; road: 0–0)

Game	Date	Team	Score	High points	High rebounds	High assists	Location Attendance	Record

1979–80 schedule

== Player statistics ==
Legend
GP	Games played	GS	Games started	MPG	Minutes per game
FG%	Field-goal percentage	3P%	3-point field-goal percentage	FT%	Free-throw percentage
RPG	Rebounds per game	APG	Assists per game	SPG	Steals per game
BPG	Blocks per game	PPG	Points per game

Player	GP	GS	MPG	FG%	3P%	FT%	RPG	APG	SPG	BPG	PPG

== Awards and records ==
- David Greenwood, NBA All-Rookie Team 1st Team

== See also ==
- 1979-80 NBA season
