= 1979–80 Kansas City Kings season =

NBA professional basketball team season

- Head coach: Cotton Fitzsimmons
- General manager: John Begzos
- Owners: Leon Karosen; Robert Margolin; H. Paul Rosenberg
- Arena: Municipal Auditorium; Kemper Arena

Results
- Record: 47–35 (.573)
- Place: Division: 2nd (Midwest); Conference: 5th (Western)
- Playoff finish: West First Round (eliminated 1-2)
- Stats at Basketball Reference

Local media
- Television: KBMA-TV
- Radio: KCMO

The 1979–80 Kansas City Kings season was the Kings 31st season in the NBA and their eighth season in Kansas City.

Due to a June 1979 storm which caused the collapse of Kemper Arena's roof, the Kings were forced to play most of their home games at Municipal Auditorium, their Kansas City home during their first two seasons in the Midwest (the Kings split their home schedule between Kansas City and Omaha during the 1972–73, 1973–74 and 1974–75 seasons before settling in Kansas City full-time). The Kings were able to return to Kemper Arena on February 20th against the Seattle SuperSonics, with their last game in the Municipal Auditorium on February 10th against the Washington Bullets.

== Draft picks ==
Round	Pick	Player	Position	Nationality	College

== Roster ==
1979–80 Kansas City Kings roster
Players

Pos.	No.	Player	Height	Weight	DOB	From
SG	10	Otis Birdsong	6 ft 3 in (1.91 m)	190 lb (86 kg)		Houston
C	16	Tommy Burleson	7 ft 2 in (2.18 m)	225 lb (102 kg)		NC State
C	41	Len Elmore	6 ft 9 in (2.06 m)	220 lb (100 kg)		Maryland
PG	1	Phil Ford	6 ft 2 in (1.88 m)	175 lb (79 kg)		North Carolina
F	22	Gus Gerard	6 ft 8 in (2.03 m)	205 lb (93 kg)		Virginia
SG	20	Ernie Grunfeld	6 ft 6 in (1.98 m)	210 lb (95 kg)		Tennessee
F	51	Reggie King	6 ft 6 in (1.98 m)	225 lb (102 kg)		Alabama
C	44	Sam Lacey	6 ft 10 in (2.08 m)	235 lb (107 kg)		New Mexico State
G	25	Billy McKinney	6 ft 0 in (1.83 m)	170 lb (77 kg)		Northwestern
F	52	Bill Robinzine	6 ft 7 in (2.01 m)	230 lb (104 kg)		DePaul
G	15	Scott Wedman	6 ft 7 in (2.01 m)	215 lb (98 kg)		Colorado

Coaches
Head coach
- Cotton Fitzsimmons
Assistant(s)
- Frank Hamblen

Legend
- (DP) Unsigned draft pick
- (FA) Free agent
- (S) Suspended
- Injured

== Regular season ==
=== Season standings ===
Midwest Division	W	L	PCT	GB	Home	Road	Div
y-Milwaukee Bucks	49	33	.598	–	28–12	21–21	15–9
x-Kansas City Kings	47	35	.573	2	30–11	17–24	18–6
Chicago Bulls	30	52	.366	19	21–20	9–32	8–16
Denver Nuggets	30	52	.366	19	24–17	6–35	10–14
Utah Jazz	24	58	.293	25	17–24	7–34	9–15

#	Western Conference				
#	Team	W	L	PCT	GB
1	c-Los Angeles Lakers	60	22	.732	–
2	y-Milwaukee Bucks	49	33	.598	11
3	x-Seattle SuperSonics	56	26	.683	4
4	x-Phoenix Suns	55	27	.671	5
5	x-Kansas City Kings	47	35	.573	13
6	x-Portland Trail Blazers	38	44	.463	22
7	San Diego Clippers	35	47	.427	25
8	Chicago Bulls	30	52	.366	30
9	Denver Nuggets	30	52	.366	30
10	Utah Jazz	24	58	.293	36
11	Golden State Warriors	24	58	.293	36

z - clinched division title
y - clinched division title
x - clinched playoff spot

== Game log ==
=== Regular season ===
1979–80 game log
Total: 47–35 (Home: 29–12; Road: 18–23)
October: 5–5 (home: 2–2; road: 3–3)

Game	Date	Team	Score	High points	High rebounds	High assists	Location Attendance	Record
7	October 26	@ Los Angeles	L 104–116				The Forum	3–4

November : 8–9 (home: 5–3; road: 3–6)

Game	Date	Team	Score	High points	High rebounds	High assists	Location Attendance	Record
14	November 7	@ Philadelphia	L 102–110				The Spectrum	5–9
17	November 13	Philadelphia	W 110–103				Municipal Auditorium	6–11
18	November 15	Los Angeles	W 114–108				Municipal Auditorium	7–11
24	November 25	@ Los Angeles	L 110–111				The Forum	11–13

December : 9–4 (home: 7–1; road: 2–3)

Game	Date	Team	Score	High points	High rebounds	High assists	Location Attendance	Record
38	December 26	Los Angeles	W 118–111				Municipal Auditorium	22–16

January : 13–5 (home: 7–1; road: 6–4)

Game	Date	Team	Score	High points	High rebounds	High assists	Location Attendance	Record

February : 6–4 (home: 4–2; road: 2–2)

Game	Date	Team	Score	High points	High rebounds	High assists	Location Attendance	Record
All-Star Break
63	February 15	@ Los Angeles	L 100–114				The Forum	37–26

March : 6–8 (home: 4–3; road: 2–5)

Game	Date	Team	Score	High points	High rebounds	High assists	Location Attendance	Record
70	March 5	Los Angeles	L 101–117				Kemper Arena	42–28

1979–80 schedule

== Playoffs ==
1980 playoff game log
First round: 1–2 (home: 1–0; road: 0–2)

Game	Date	Team	Score	High points	High rebounds	High assists	Location Attendance	Series
1	April 2	@ Phoenix	L 93–96	Otis Birdsong (23)	Reggie King (10)	Phil Ford (7)	Arizona Veterans Memorial Coliseum; 12,660	0–1
2	April 4	Phoenix	W 106–96	Scott Wedman (32)	Scott Wedman (9)	Phil Ford (13)	Kemper Arena; 9,637	1–1
3	April 6	@ Phoenix	L 99–114	Scott Wedman (24)	Reggie King (11)	Phil Ford (6)	Arizona Veterans Memorial Coliseum; 11,306	1–2

1980 schedule

== Awards and records ==
- Scott Wedman, NBA All-Defensive Second Team

== See also ==
- 1979-80 NBA season
