= 1979–80 Milwaukee Bucks season =

NBA professional basketball team season

- Division champions
- Head coach: Don Nelson
- General manager: Don Nelson
- Owner: Jim Fitzgerald
- Arena: MECCA Arena

Results
- Record: 49–33 (.598)
- Place: Division: 1st (Midwest); Conference: 2nd (Western)
- Playoff finish: Conference semifinals (lost to SuperSonics 3–4)
- Stats at Basketball Reference

Local media
- Television: WVTV
- Radio: WTMJ

The 1979–80 Milwaukee Bucks season was the Bucks' 12th season in the NBA. With 49 wins and 33 losses they won their division and ranked fourth in the Western Conference. In the 1979 NBA draft, the Bucks drafted guard Sidney Moncrief out of the University of Arkansas. During the season, the Bucks acquired center Bob Lanier from the Detroit Pistons. After a first-round-bye the Bucks faced the defending champions, the Seattle SuperSonics, which were led by Gus Williams and Dennis Johnson. Despite being able to steal two games on the road, the Bucks lost the series in seven games. The 1979–80 season would be the Bucks last season as a Western Conference team as they switched to the Eastern Conference along with the Chicago Bulls.

== Draft picks ==
| Round | Pick | Player | Position | Nationality | College |
|---|---|---|---|---|---|
| 1 | 5 | Sidney Moncrief | SG | United States | Arkansas |
| 2 | 31 | Edgar Jones | PF/C | United States | Nevada-Reno |
| 3 | 52 | Larry Gibson | | United States | Maryland |
| 4 | 69 | Eugene Robinson | | United States | Louisiana-Monroe |
| 5 | 97 | Jim Tillman | | United States | Eastern Kentucky |
| 6 | 116 | Derrick Mayes | | United States | Illinois State |
| 7 | 138 | Stan Ray | | United States | California State-Fullerton |
| 8 | 156 | Larry Spicer | | United States | Alabama-Birmingham |
| 9 | 174 | Roger Lapham | | United States | Maine |
| 10 | 193 | Chris Fahrbach | | United States | North Dakota |

== Roster ==
1979–80 Milwaukee Bucks roster
Players

| Pos. | No. | Player | Height | Weight | DOB | From |
|---|---|---|---|---|---|---|
| SF | 2 | Junior Bridgeman | 6 ft 5 in (1.96 m) | 210 lb (95 kg) | 1953–09–17 | Louisville |
| PG | 21 | Quinn Buckner | 6 ft 3 in (1.91 m) | 190 lb (86 kg) | 1954–08–20 | Indiana |
| PF | 42 | Harvey Catchings | 6 ft 9 in (2.06 m) | 218 lb (99 kg) | 1951–09–02 | Hardin–Simmons |
| PF | 6 | Pat Cummings | 6 ft 9 in (2.06 m) | 230 lb (104 kg) | 1956–07–11 | Cincinnati |
| SF | 8 | Marques Johnson | 6 ft 7 in (2.01 m) | 218 lb (99 kg) | 1956–02–08 | UCLA |
| C | 16 | Bob Lanier | 6 ft 11 in (2.11 m) | 250 lb (113 kg) | 1948–09–10 | St. Bonaventure |
| PF | 7 | Dave Meyers | 6 ft 8 in (2.03 m) | 215 lb (98 kg) | 1953–04–21 | UCLA |
| PG | 4 | Sidney Moncrief | 6 ft 3 in (1.91 m) | 180 lb (82 kg) | 1957–09–21 | Arkansas |
| PG | 11 | Lloyd Walton | 6 ft 0 in (1.83 m) | 160 lb (73 kg) | 1953–11–23 | Marquette |
| PF | 31 | Richard Washington | 6 ft 11 in (2.11 m) | 220 lb (100 kg) | 1955–07–15 | UCLA |
| SG | 32 | Brian Winters | 6 ft 4 in (1.93 m) | 185 lb (84 kg) | 1952–03–01 | South Carolina |

Coaches
Head coach
- Don Nelson
Assistant(s)
- John Killilea

Legend
- (DP) Unsigned draft pick
- (FA) Free agent
- (S) Suspended
- Injured

== Regular season ==
=== Season standings ===
| Midwest Division | W | L | PCT | GB | Home | Road | Div |
|---|---|---|---|---|---|---|---|
| y-Milwaukee Bucks | 49 | 33 | .598 | – | 28–12 | 21–21 | 15–9 |
| x-Kansas City Kings | 47 | 35 | .573 | 2 | 30–11 | 17–24 | 18–6 |
| Chicago Bulls | 30 | 52 | .366 | 19 | 21–20 | 9–32 | 8–16 |
| Denver Nuggets | 30 | 52 | .366 | 19 | 24–17 | 6–35 | 10–14 |
| Utah Jazz | 24 | 58 | .293 | 25 | 17–24 | 7–34 | 9–15 |

| # | Western Conference | | | | |
| # | Team | W | L | PCT | GB |
|---|---|---|---|---|---|
| 1 | c-Los Angeles Lakers | 60 | 22 | .732 | – |
| 2 | y-Milwaukee Bucks | 49 | 33 | .598 | 11 |
| 3 | x-Seattle SuperSonics | 56 | 26 | .683 | 4 |
| 4 | x-Phoenix Suns | 55 | 27 | .671 | 5 |
| 5 | x-Kansas City Kings | 47 | 35 | .573 | 13 |
| 6 | x-Portland Trail Blazers | 38 | 44 | .463 | 22 |
| 7 | San Diego Clippers | 35 | 47 | .427 | 25 |
| 8 | Chicago Bulls | 30 | 52 | .366 | 30 |
| 9 | Denver Nuggets | 30 | 52 | .366 | 30 |
| 10 | Utah Jazz | 24 | 58 | .293 | 36 |
| 11 | Golden State Warriors | 24 | 58 | .293 | 36 |

z - clinched division title
y - clinched division title
x - clinched playoff spot

=== Game log ===
1979–80 game log
Total: 49–33 (home: 28–12; road: 21–21)
October: 9–1 (home: 5–0; road: 4–1)

| Game | Date | Team | Score | High points | High rebounds | High assists | Location Attendance | Record |
|---|---|---|---|---|---|---|---|---|
| 1 | October 12, 1979 | @ Kansas City | L 103–105 | Marques Johnson (28) | | | Municipal Auditorium | 0–1 |
| 2 | October 13, 1979 | @ Denver | W 125–96 | Dave Meyers (26) | | | McNichols Sports Arena | 1–1 |
| 3 | October 15, 1979 | @ Utah | W 131–107 | Junior Bridgeman (28) | | | Salt Palace | 2–1 |
| 4 | October 17, 1979 | Denver | W 125–97 | Marques Johnson (27) | Kent Benson (9) | | MECCA Arena | 3–1 |
| 5 | October 19, 1979 | Phoenix | W 95–94 | Brian Winters (18) | | | MECCA Arena | 4–1 |
| 6 | October 21, 1979 | Chicago | W 113–111 | Junior Bridgeman (26) | | | MECCA Arena | 5–1 |
| 7 | October 23, 1979 | @ Phoenix | W 114–108 | | | | Arizona Veterans Memorial Coliseum | 6–1 |
| 8 | October 25, 1979 | @ San Diego | W 118–115 | Brian Winters (23) | | | San Diego Sports Arena | 7–1 |
| 9 | October 27, 1979 | Detroit | W 132–118 | | | | MECCA Arena | 8–1 |
| 10 | October 31, 1979 | Los Angeles | W 110–106 | | | | MECCA Arena | 9–1 |

November: 8–6 (home: 4–3; road: 4–3)

| Game | Date | Team | Score | High points | High rebounds | High assists | Location Attendance | Record |
|---|---|---|---|---|---|---|---|---|
| 11 | November 3, 1979 | @ Chicago | W 136–134 (OT) | | | | Chicago Stadium | 10–1 |
| 12 | November 4, 1979 | Seattle | L 101–114 | | | | MECCA Arena | 10–2 |
| 13 | November 6, 1979 | Philadelphia | L 117–118 | | | | MECCA Arena | 10–3 |
| 14 | November 8, 1979 | Portland | W 98–89 | | | | MECCA Arena | 11–3 |
| 15 | November 10, 1979 | San Diego | W 133–104 | | | | MECCA Arena | 12–3 |
| 16 | November 13, 1979 | @ Portland | W 101–92 | | | | Memorial Coliseum | 13–3 |
| 17 | November 14, 1979 | @ Seattle | L 117–136 | | | | Kingdome | 13–4 |
| 18 | November 18, 1979 | @ San Diego | L 96–112 | | | | San Diego Sports Arena | 13–5 |
| 19 | November 21, 1979 | Atlanta | W 96–93 | | | | MECCA Arena | 14–5 |
| 20 | November 22, 1979 | @ New Jersey | W 117–109 | | | | Rutgers Athletic Center | 15–5 |
| 21 | November 23, 1979 | @ Detroit | L 100–119 | | | | Pontiac Silverdome | 15–6 |
| 22 | November 25, 1979 | Golden State | W 114–90 | | | | MECCA Arena | 16–6 |
| 23 | November 27, 1979 | New Jersey | L 93–118 | | | | MECCA Arena | 16–7 |
| 24 | November 28, 1979 | @ Indiana | W 87–79 | | | | Market Square Arena | 17–7 |

December: 5–10 (home: 3–3; road: 2–7)

| Game | Date | Team | Score | High points | High rebounds | High assists | Location Attendance | Record |
|---|---|---|---|---|---|---|---|---|
| 25 | December 1, 1979 | @ Golden State | W 109–99 | | | | Oakland-Alameda County Coliseum Arena | 18–7 |
| 26 | December 2, 1979 | @ Los Angeles | L 103–116 | | | | The Forum | 18–8 |
| 27 | December 3, 1979 | @ Utah | W 96–89 | | | | Salt Palace | 19–8 |
| 28 | December 5, 1979 | @ Denver | L 107–123 | | | | McNichols Sports Arena | 19–9 |
| 29 | December 7, 1979 | San Antonio | L 105–117 | | | | MECCA Arena | 19–10 |
| 30 | December 9, 1979 | Boston | L 108–113 | | | | MECCA Arena | 19–11 |
| 31 | December 11, 1979 | Seattle | L 99–103 | | | | MECCA Arena | 19–12 |
| 33 | December 12, 1979 | @ Philadelphia | L 91–112 | | | | The Spectrum | 19–13 |
| 33 | December 14, 1979 | @ Boston | L 94–97 | | | | Boston Garden | 19–14 |
| 34 | December 16, 1979 | Utah | W 104–79 | | | | MECCA Arena | 20–14 |
| 35 | December 20, 1979 | Kansas City | W 120–109 | | | | MECCA Arena | 21–14 |
| 36 | December 23, 1979 | @ Phoenix | L 103–106 | | | | Arizona Veterans Memorial Coliseum | 21–15 |
| 37 | December 26, 1979 | Chicago | W 110–101 | | | | MECCA Arena | 22–15 |
| 38 | December 27, 1979 | @ Washington | L 108–117 | | | | Capital Centre | 22–16 |
| 39 | December 29, 1979 | @ New York | L 105–117 | | | | Madison Square Garden | 22–17 |
| 40 | December 30, 1979 | Utah | L 88–95 | | | | MECCA Arena | 22–18 |

January: 6–6 (home: 4–2; road: 2–4)

| Game | Date | Team | Score | High points | High rebounds | High assists | Location Attendance | Record |
|---|---|---|---|---|---|---|---|---|
| 41 | January 3, 1980 | Indiana | W 106–96 | | | | MECCA Arena | 23–18 |
| 42 | January 5, 1980 | @ Cleveland | W 99–98 | | | | Richfield Coliseum | 24–18 |
| 43 | January 6, 1980 | Los Angeles | W 113–103 | | | | MECCA Arena | 25–18 |
| 44 | January 8, 1980 | @ Chicago | L 102–110 | | | | Chicago Stadium | 25–19 |
| 46 | January 11, 1980 | New York | W 109–107 | | | | MECCA Arena | 26–20 |
| 47 | January 13, 1980 | Houston | L 117–121 | | | | MECCA Arena | 26–21 |
| 48 | January 16, 1980 | Kansas City | L 108–112 | | | | MECCA Arena | 26–22 |
| 50 | January 20, 1980 | Portland | W 89–88 | | | | MECCA Arena | 27–23 |
| 53 | January 25, 1980 | @ Phoenix | L 96–110 | | | | Arizona Veterans Memorial Coliseum | 28–25 |
| 54 | January 27, 1980 | @ Los Angeles | L 102–112 | | | | The Forum | 28–26 |
| 55 | January 29, 1980 | @ Portland | W 103–96 | | | | Memorial Coliseum | 29–26 |
| 56 | January 31, 1980 | @ Seattle | L 101–105 | | | | Kingdome | 29–27 |

February: 9–2 (home: 5–0; road: 4–2)

| Game | Date | Team | Score | High points | High rebounds | High assists | Location Attendance | Record |
|---|---|---|---|---|---|---|---|---|
| 57 | February 6, 1980 | Cleveland | W 111–109 | | | | MECCA Arena | 30–27 |
| 58 | February 8, 1980 | Washington | W 115–90 | | | | MECCA Arena | 31–27 |
| 59 | February 10, 1980 | Phoenix | W 109–107 | Bob Lanier (23) | | | MECCA Arena | 32–27 |
| 60 | February 13, 1980 | Chicago | W 111–101 | Junior Bridgeman (32) | | | MECCA Arena | 33–27 |
| 62 | February 15, 1980 | @ Houston | W 114–103 | | | | The Summit | 35–27 |
| 63 | February 17, 1980 | @ San Antonio | L 134–135 | | | | HemisFair Arena | 35–28 |
| 64 | February 20, 1980 | @ Atlanta | L 103–106 | | | | The Omni | 35–29 |
| 65 | February 24, 1980 | @ Kansas City | W 94–72 | | | | Kemper Arena | 36–29 |
| 66 | February 26, 1980 | San Diego | W 122–88 | Pat Cummings (25) | Harvey Catchings (11) | Junior Bridgeman, Quinn Buckner (7) | MECCA Arena | 37–29 |
| 67 | February 27, 1980 | @ Phoenix | W 119–110 (OT) | | | | Arizona Veterans Memorial Coliseum | 38–29 |
| 68 | February 29, 1980 | @ Los Angeles | W 126–117 | Brian Winters (34) | | | The Forum | 36–29 |

March: 2–0 (home: 2–0; road: 0–0)

| Game | Date | Team | Score | High points | High rebounds | High assists | Location Attendance | Record |
|---|---|---|---|---|---|---|---|---|
| 70 | March 4, 1980 | Los Angeles | L 124–127 | | | | MECCA Arena | 40–30 |
| 73 | March 12, 1980 | Seattle | W 112–103 | | | | MECCA Arena | 42–31 |
| 74 | March 14, 1980 | Portland | W 120–110 | | | | MECCA Arena | 43–31 |
| 75 | March 16, 1980 | Kansas City | W 128–121 | | | | MECCA Arena | 44–31 |
| 76 | March 18, 1980 | @ Portland | L 122–123 | | | | Memorial Coliseum | 44–32 |
| 77 | March 19, 1980 | @ Seattle | W 108–106 | | | | Kingdome | 45–32 |
| 78 | March 21, 1980 | Golden State | W 121–93 | | | | MECCA Arena | 46–32 |
| 79 | March 25, 1980 | @ Chicago | W 122–111 | | | | Chicago Stadium | 47–32 |
| 81 | March 28, 1980 | @ Kansas City | L 114–116 | | | | Kemper Arena | 48–33 |

1979–80 schedule

== Playoffs ==
1980 playoff game log
Conference semifinals: 3–4 (home: 2–1; road: 1–3)

| Game | Date | Team | Score | High points | High rebounds | High assists | Location Attendance | Series |
|---|---|---|---|---|---|---|---|---|
| 1 | April 8 | @ Seattle | L 113–114 (OT) | Bob Lanier (27) | Bob Lanier (10) | Quinn Buckner (8) | Seattle Center Coliseum; 13,648 | 0–1 |
| 2 | April 9 | @ Seattle | W 114–112 (OT) | Brian Winters (28) | Bob Lanier (8) | Brian Winters (5) | Seattle Center Coliseum; 14,050 | 1–1 |
| 3 | April 11 | Seattle | W 95–91 | Bob Lanier (24) | Marques Johnson (10) | Quinn Buckner (7) | MECCA Arena; 10,938 | 2–1 |
| 4 | April 13 | Seattle | L 107–112 | Marques Johnson (31) | Lanier, Meyers (9) | Junior Bridgeman (8) | MECCA Arena; 10,938 | 2–2 |
| 5 | April 15 | @ Seattle | W 108–97 | Bob Lanier (22) | Marques Johnson (8) | Bob Lanier (6) | Kingdome; 40,172 | 3–2 |
| 6 | April 18 | Seattle | L 85–86 | Marques Johnson (22) | Bob Lanier (12) | Brian Winters (7) | MECCA Arena; 10,938 | 3–3 |
| 7 | April 20 | @ Seattle | L 94–98 | Marques Johnson (22) | Bob Lanier (15) | Quinn Buckner (7) | Seattle Center Coliseum; 14,050 | 3–4 |

1980 schedule

== Player statistics ==
Legend
| GP | Games played | GS | Games started | MPG | Minutes per game |
| FG% | Field-goal percentage | 3P% | 3-point field-goal percentage | FT% | Free-throw percentage |
| RPG | Rebounds per game | APG | Assists per game | SPG | Steals per game |
| BPG | Blocks per game | PPG | Points per game |

=== Season ===
Season
| Player | GP | GS | MPG | FG% | 3FG% | FT% | RPG | APG | SPG | BPG | PPG |
|---|---|---|---|---|---|---|---|---|---|---|---|
| Marques Johnson | 77 | | 34.9 | 54.4 | 22.2 | 79.1 | 7.4 | 3.5 | 1.3 | 0.9 | 21.7 |
| Junior Bridgeman | 81 | | 28.6 | 47.8 | 18.5 | 86.5 | 3.7 | 2.9 | 1.2 | 0.2 | 17.6 |
| Brian Winters | 80 | | 32.8 | 47.9 | 37.3 | 86.0 | 2.8 | 4.5 | 1.3 | 0.4 | 16.2 |
| Bob Lanier | 26 | | 28.4 | 51.9 | 100.0 | 78.5 | 6.9 | 2.4 | 1.4 | 1.1 | 15.7 |
| Dave Meyers | 79 | | 27.9 | 48.1 | 20.0 | 63.4 | 5.7 | 2.8 | 0.9 | 0.5 | 12.1 |
| Quinn Buckner | 67 | | 25.2 | 46.7 | 40.0 | 73.4 | 3.6 | 5.7 | 2.0 | 0.1 | 10.7 |
| Kent Benson | 56 | | 24.8 | 49.4 | 0.0 | 68.0 | 5.9 | 2.3 | 1.0 | 1.3 | 8.8 |
| Sidney Moncrief | 77 | | 20.2 | 46.8 | 0.0 | 79.5 | 4.4 | 1.7 | 0.9 | 0.2 | 8.5 |
| Pat Cummings | 71 | | 12.7 | 50.5 | 0.0 | 76.4 | 3.4 | 0.7 | 0.3 | 0.2 | 6.6 |
| Richard Washington | 75 | | 14.6 | 46.8 | 0.0 | 60.5 | 3.7 | 0.7 | 0.3 | 0.6 | 5.9 |
| Lloyd Walton | 76 | | 16.4 | 45.5 | 33.3 | 69.0 | 1.2 | 3.8 | 0.6 | 0.0 | 3.6 |
| Harvey Catchings | 72 | | 19.0 | 39.8 | 0.0 | 62.9 | 5.7 | 1.1 | 0.3 | 2.3 | 3.2 |

=== Playoffs ===
| Player | GP | GS | MPG | FG% | 3FG% | FT% | RPG | APG | SPG | BPG | PPG |
|---|---|---|---|---|---|---|---|---|---|---|---|
| Marques Johnson | 7 | | 43.3 | 42.2 | 33.3 | 75.0 | 6.9 | 2.9 | 0.7 | 0.9 | 19.9 |
| Bob Lanier | 7 | | 36.6 | 51.5 | 0.0 | 73.8 | 9.3 | 4.4 | 1.0 | 1.1 | 19.3 |
| Brian Winters | 7 | | 38.3 | 46.0 | 42.9 | 100.0 | 3.0 | 5.3 | 1.6 | 0.0 | 15.9 |
| Sidney Moncrief | 7 | | 26.0 | 58.8 | 0.0 | 87.1 | 4.4 | 1.6 | 0.7 | 0.1 | 12.4 |
| Junior Bridgeman | 5 | | 24.8 | 35.7 | 0.0 | 73.3 | 3.8 | 3.4 | 1.0 | 0.4 | 10.2 |
| Dave Meyers | 7 | | 27.9 | 41.9 | 0.0 | 46.7 | 5.0 | 2.0 | 1.3 | 0.9 | 9.4 |
| Richard Washington | 7 | | 16.0 | 53.2 | 0.0 | 25.0 | 2.9 | 0.4 | 0.6 | 1.1 | 7.3 |
| Quinn Buckner | 7 | | 23.6 | 34.0 | 0.0 | 63.6 | 2.3 | 4.4 | 2.1 | 0.0 | 6.1 |
| Pat Cummings | 6 | | 9.5 | 64.7 | 0.0 | 83.3 | 2.7 | 0.3 | 0.2 | 0.0 | 4.5 |
| Harvey Catchings | 6 | | 10.7 | 33.3 | 0.0 | 50.0 | 3.5 | 0.3 | 0.0 | 1.3 | 1.0 |
| Lloyd Walton | 1 | | 4.0 | 0.0 | 0.0 | 0.0 | 1.0 | 1.0 | 0.0 | 1.0 | 0.0 |

== Awards and records ==
- Marques Johnson, All-NBA Second Team
- Quinn Buckner, NBA All-Defensive Second Team

== Transactions ==
=== Trades ===
May 31, 1979

To Milwaukee Bucks----
- Harvey Catchings
To New Jersey Nets----
- John Gianelli
October 9, 1979

To Milwaukee Bucks----
- Richard Washington
To Kansas City Kings----
- Ernie Grunfeld
February 4, 1980

To Milwaukee Bucks----
- Bob Lanier
To Detroit Pistons----
- Kent Benson
- 1980 1st round pick (Larry Drew)

== See also ==
- 1979–80 NBA season
