= 1979–80 Seattle SuperSonics season =

NBA professional basketball team season

- Head coach: Lenny Wilkens
- General manager: Zollie Volchok
- Owner: Sam Schulman
- Arena: Kingdome; Seattle Center Coliseum (playoffs); Hec Edmundson Pavilion (playoffs)

Results
- Record: 56–26 (.683)
- Place: Division: 2nd (Pacific); Conference: 3rd (Western)
- Playoff finish: Conference finals (lost to Lakers 1–4)
- Stats at Basketball Reference

Local media
- Television: KIRO-TV
- Radio: KIRO

The 1979–80 Seattle SuperSonics season was the SuperSonics' 13th season in the NBA. The SuperSonics entered the season as the defending NBA champions, having defeated the Washington Bullets in five games in the 1979 NBA Finals, winning their first NBA championship.

In the playoffs, the SuperSonics defeated the Portland Trail Blazers in three games in the First Round, then defeated the Milwaukee Bucks in seven games in the Semi-finals, before losing to the eventual NBA champion Los Angeles Lakers in five games in the conference finals.

== Offseason ==
=== Draft ===
Round	Pick	Player	Position	Nationality	College
1	6	James Bailey	PF/C	United States	Rutgers
1	7	Vinnie Johnson	SG/PG	United States	Baylor
2	43	Johnny Moore	PG	United States	Texas
4	73	James Donaldson	C	United Kingdom	Washington State
4	87	Richie Allen	F	United States	Cal State Dominguez Hills

== Roster ==
1979–80 Seattle SuperSonics roster
Players

Pos.	No.	Player	Height	Weight	DOB	From
PF	20	James Bailey	6 ft 9 in (2.06 m)	220 lb (100 kg)	1957–05–21	Rutgers
SG	32	Fred Brown	6 ft 3 in (1.91 m)	182 lb (83 kg)	1948–08–07	Iowa
SG	24	Dennis Johnson	6 ft 4 in (1.93 m)	185 lb (84 kg)	1954–09–18	Pepperdine
SF	27	John Johnson	6 ft 7 in (2.01 m)	200 lb (91 kg)	1947–10–18	Iowa
SG	15	Vinnie Johnson	6 ft 2 in (1.88 m)	200 lb (91 kg)	1956–09–01	Baylor
C	23	Tom LaGarde	6 ft 10 in (2.08 m)	220 lb (100 kg)	1955–02–10	North Carolina
PF	8	Lonnie Shelton	6 ft 8 in (2.03 m)	240 lb (109 kg)	1955–10–19	Oregon State
C	43	Jack Sikma	6 ft 11 in (2.11 m)	230 lb (104 kg)	1955–11–14	Illinois Wesleyan
PF	36	Paul Silas	6 ft 7 in (2.01 m)	220 lb (100 kg)	1943–07–12	Creighton
SF	42	Wally Walker	6 ft 7 in (2.01 m)	190 lb (86 kg)	1954–07–18	Virginia
PG	1	Gus Williams	6 ft 2 in (1.88 m)	175 lb (79 kg)	1953–10–10	USC

Coaches
Head coach
- Lenny Wilkens
Assistant(s)
- Les Habegger

Legend
- (DP) Unsigned draft pick
- (FA) Free agent
- (S) Suspended
- Injured

Roster
Updated: October 11, 1979

== Standings ==
Pacific Division	W	L	PCT	GB	Home	Road	Div
y-Los Angeles Lakers	60	22	.732	–	37–4	23–18	19–11
x-Seattle SuperSonics	56	26	.683	4	33–8	23–18	18–12
x-Phoenix Suns	55	27	.671	5	37–5	18–22	19–11
x-Portland Trail Blazers	38	44	.463	22	26–15	12–29	13–17
San Diego Clippers	35	47	.427	25	24–17	11–30	13–17
Golden State Warriors	24	58	.293	36	15–26	9–32	8–22

#	Western Conference				
#	Team	W	L	PCT	GB
1	c-Los Angeles Lakers	60	22	.732	–
2	y-Milwaukee Bucks	49	33	.598	11
3	x-Seattle SuperSonics	56	26	.683	4
4	x-Phoenix Suns	55	27	.671	5
5	x-Kansas City Kings	47	35	.573	13
6	x-Portland Trail Blazers	38	44	.463	22
7	San Diego Clippers	35	47	.427	25
8	Chicago Bulls	30	52	.366	30
9	Denver Nuggets	30	52	.366	30
10	Utah Jazz	24	58	.293	36
11	Golden State Warriors	24	58	.293	36

== Game log ==
=== Regular season ===
G	Date	Opponent	Score	Record
1	October 14	@ San Diego	L 93–98	0–1
2	October 16	@ Phoenix	L 86–102	0–2
3	October 17	Los Angeles	W 112–110	1–2
4	October 19	San Diego	W 106–98	2–2
5	October 21	@ Los Angeles	L 97–106	2–3
6	October 24	Kansas City	W 105–92	3–3
7	October 26	Phoenix	L 86–92	3–4
8	October 27	@ San Diego	L 105–110	3–5
9	October 28	Chicago	W 108–97	4–5
10	October 31	Denver	W 97–89	5–5
11	November 2	San Antonio	W 117–107	6–5
12	November 4	@ Milwaukee	W 114–101	7–5
13	November 6	@ Chicago	W 114–97	8–5
14	November 7	@ Denver	L 92–113	8–6
15	November 10	@ Utah	W 88–87	9–6
16	November 14	Milwaukee	W 136–117	10–6
17	November 16	Cleveland	W 108–100	11–6
18	November 17	@ Golden State	W 108–103	12–6
19	November 18	@ Portland	L 95–100	12–7
20	November 21	Los Angeles	W 119–110	13–7
21	November 23	Portland	W 94–90	14–7
22	November 28	Phoenix	W 127–116	15–7
23	November 30	@ Kansas City	W 107–102 (OT)	16–7
24	December 1	@ Utah	L 95–97	16–8
25	December 2	Golden State	W 111–98	17–8
26	December 5	Utah	W 115–96	18–8
27	December 8	@ Golden State	W 125–100	19–8
28	December 9	Chicago	L 112–121	19–9
29	December 11	@ Milwaukee	W 103–99	20–9
30	December 12	@ Indiana	W 112–107	21–9
31	December 14	Houston	W 109–101	22–9
32	December 16	Denver	W 123–121	23–9
33	December 19	New Jersey	L 114–122	23–10
34	December 21	New York	W 121–102	24–10
35	December 23	@ Los Angeles	L 97–102	24–11
36	December 26	San Diego	W 124–104	25–11
37	December 28	Portland	W 126–97	26–11
38	December 30	@ Portland	W 107–100	27–11
39	January 2	Washington	L 134–139 (2OT)	27–12
40	January 4	Detroit	W 123–105	28–12
41	January 5	@ Golden State	W 121–112	29–12
42	January 6	@ San Diego	L 103–105	29–13
43	January 8	Indiana	W 120–111	30–13
44	January 11	Utah	W 100–90	31–13
45	January 12	@ Denver	W 105–102	32–13
46	January 13	Golden State	W 109–101	33–13
47	January 15	@ Washington	W 120–100	34–13
48	January 18	@ New York	W 124–117	35–13
49	January 20	@ Boston	W 108–106 (2OT)	36–13
50	January 23	@ Atlanta	W 98–96	37–13
51	January 25	@ San Antonio	L 116–125	37–14
52	January 26	@ Houston	L 111–123	37–15
53	January 30	Kansas City	L 97–99	37–16
54	January 31	Milwaukee	W 105–101	38–16
55	February 5	@ Cleveland	W 123–121	39–16
56	February 7	@ Detroit	W 119–102	40–16
57	February 8	@Philadelphia	W 109–94	41–16
58	February 10	@ New Jersey	W 122–107	42–16
59	February 13	Atlanta	W 93–86	43–16
60	February 14	Denver	W 93–84	44–16
61	February 17	Boston	W 109–108	45–16
62	February 19	@ Chicago	L 106–115	45–17
63	February 20	@ Kansas City	L 105–107	45–18
64	February 23	@ Utah	W 105–95	46–18
65	February 26	@ Los Angeles	L 108–131	46–19
66	February 27	Philadelphia	L 98–101 (OT)	46–20
67	February 29	Chicago	W 108–101	47–20
68	March 2	Utah	W 103–91	48–20
69	March 4	@ Portland	W 98–97	49–20
70	March 5	@ Phoenix	L 111–127	49–21
71	March 8	@ Denver	W 104–97	50–21
72	March 9	@ Kansas City	L 93–113	50–22
73	March 12	@ Milwaukee	L 103–112	50–23
74	March 14	@ Chicago	W 122–101	51–23
75	March 19	Milwaukee	L 106–108	51–24
76	March 21	San Diego	W 107–104	52–24
77	March 22	Los Angeles	L 92–97	52–25
78	March 23	Kansas City	W 112–90	53–25
79	March 25	Phoenix	W 104–95	54–25
80	March 26	@ Phoenix	L 99–109	54–26
81	March 28	Golden State	W 108–82	55–26
82	March 30	Portland	W 135–104	56–26

=== Playoffs ===
1980 playoff game log
First round: 2–1 (home: 2–0; road: 0–1)

Game	Date	Team	Score	High points	High rebounds	High assists	Location Attendance	Series
1	April 2	Portland	W 120–110	Gus Williams (35)	three players tied (8)	Gus Williams (6)	Kingdome; 26,412	1–0
2	April 4	@ Portland	L 95–105 (OT)	Dennis Johnson (24)	Lonnie Shelton (12)	Gus Williams (8)	Memorial Coliseum; 12,666	1–1
3	April 6	Portland	W 103–86	Gus Williams (21)	John Johnson (8)	Williams, D. Johnson (6)	Kingdome; 23,546	2–1

Conference Semi-finals: 4–3 (home: 2–2; road: 2–1)

Game	Date	Team	Score	High points	High rebounds	High assists	Location Attendance	Series
1	April 8	Milwaukee	W 114–113 (OT)	Gus Williams (30)	Jack Sikma (11)	John Johnson (6)	Seattle Center Coliseum; 13,648	1–0
2	April 9	Milwaukee	L 112–114 (OT)	Lonnie Shelton (25)	Lonnie Shelton (9)	Williams, J. Johnson (7)	Seattle Center Coliseum; 14,050	1–1
3	April 11	@ Milwaukee	L 91–95	Jack Sikma (20)	Jack Sikma (13)	Williams, J. Johnson (7)	MECCA Arena; 10,938	1–2
4	April 13	@ Milwaukee	W 112–107	Gus Williams (32)	Lonnie Shelton (15)	John Johnson (7)	MECCA Arena; 10,938	2–2
5	April 15	Milwaukee	L 97–108	Gus Williams (22)	Jack Sikma (9)	Dennis Johnson (7)	Kingdome; 40,172	2–3
6	April 18	@ Milwaukee	W 86–85	Dennis Johnson (18)	Paul Silas (14)	John Johnson (7)	MECCA Arena; 10,938	3–3
7	April 20	Milwaukee	W 98–94	Gus Williams (33)	Lonnie Shelton (15)	Dennis Johnson (5)	Seattle Center Coliseum; 14,050	4–3

Conference finals: 1–4 (home: 0–2; road: 1–2)

Game	Date	Team	Score	High points	High rebounds	High assists	Location Attendance	Series
1	April 22	@ Los Angeles	W 108–107	Gus Williams (28)	Lonnie Shelton (9)	John Johnson (9)	The Forum; 17,505	1–0
2	April 23	@ Los Angeles	L 99–108	Gus Williams (24)	Jack Sikma (11)	Jack Sikma (8)	The Forum; 17,505	1–1
3	April 25	Los Angeles	L 100–104	Gus Williams (23)	John Johnson (9)	Gus Williams (11)	Hec Edmundson Pavilion; 8,524	1–2
4	April 27	Los Angeles	L 93–98	Gus Williams (25)	Dennis Johnson (9)	Gus Williams (7)	Hec Edmundson Pavilion; 8,524	1–3
5	April 30	@ Los Angeles	L 105–111	Dennis Johnson (29)	Jack Sikma (9)	Williams, J. Johnson (6)	The Forum; 17,505	1–4

1980 schedule

== Player statistics ==
Legend
GP	Games played	GS	Games started	MPG	Minutes per game
FG%	Field-goal percentage	3P%	3-point field-goal percentage	FT%	Free-throw percentage
RPG	Rebounds per game	APG	Assists per game	SPG	Steals per game
BPG	Blocks per game	PPG	Points per game

=== Regular season ===
Player	GP	GS	MPG	FG%	3FG%	FT%	RPG	APG	SPG	BPG	PPG
James Bailey	67		10.8	.450		.673	2.9	.4	.3	.8	4.7
Fred Brown	80		21.3	.479	.443	.837	1.9	2.2	.8	.2	12.0
Dennis Johnson	81		36.3	.422	.207	.780	5.1	4.1	1.8	1.0	19.0
John Johnson	81		31.3	.488		.801	5.3	5.2	.9	.4	11.3
Vinnie Johnson	38		8.6	.391	.000	.795	1.4	1.4	.5	.1	3.2
Tom LaGarde	82		14.2	.477		.657	3.8	1.1	.2	.4	4.7
Lonnie Shelton	76		29.5	.530	.200	.763	7.7	1.9	1.2	1.0	13.6
Jack Sikma	82		34.1	.475	.000	.805	11.1	3.4	.8	.9	14.3
Paul Silas	82		19.5	.378		.654	5.3	.8	.3	.1	3.8
Wally Walker	70		12.1	.507		.750	2.4	.8	.3	.1	4.7
Gus Williams	82		36.2	.482	.194	.788	3.4	4.8	2.4	.5	22.1

=== Playoffs ===
Player	GP	GS	MPG	FG%	3FG%	FT%	RPG	APG	SPG	BPG	PPG
James Bailey	12		11.5	.477	.000	.650	2.1	.4	.8	.8	4.6
Fred Brown	15		20.9	.440	.294	.857	2.5	2.1	.1	.1	12.5
Dennis Johnson	15		38.8	.410	.333	.839	4.3	3.8	1.8	.7	17.1
John Johnson	15		32.4	.494	.000	.811	6.8	5.7	.5	.2	12.4
Vinnie Johnson	5		2.4	.333			.4	.4	.2	.0	.4
Tom LaGarde	14		11.6	.370		.818	2.9	.9	.1	.0	3.1
Lonnie Shelton	15		31.3	.507	.000	.627	8.3	1.7	1.5	.8	12.0
Jack Sikma	15		35.6	.399	.000	.852	8.4	3.7	1.1	.3	11.7
Paul Silas	15		17.1	.302		.846	5.0	1.0	.6	.1	2.5
Wally Walker	13		12.1	.514		.750	2.2	.5	.1	.2	4.2
Gus Williams	15		37.6	.514	.200	.721	4.0	5.6	2.3	.5	23.7

== Awards and records ==
- Dennis Johnson, All-NBA Second Team
- Gus Williams, All-NBA Second Team
- Dennis Johnson, NBA All-Defensive First Team

== Transactions ==
October 19, 1979

- Waived Joe Hassett.
- Waived Jackie Robinson.

October 11, 1979

- Waived Dennis Awtrey.

== See also ==
- 1979-80 NBA season
