= Wally Walker =

American basketball player (born 1954)

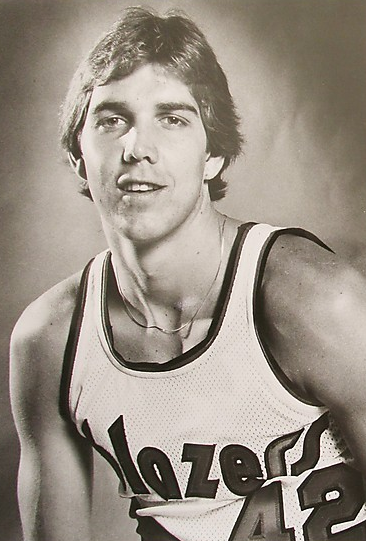
- Walker with the Portland Trail Blazers in 1976

Personal information
- Born: July 18, 1954 (age 72) Millersville, Pennsylvania, U.S.
- Listed height: 6 ft 7 in (2.01 m)
- Listed weight: 191 lb (87 kg)

Career information
- High school: Penn Manor (Millersville, Pennsylvania)
- College: Virginia (1972–1976)
- NBA draft: 1976: 1st round, 5th overall pick
- Drafted by: Portland Trail Blazers
- Playing career: 1976–1985
- Position: Small forward
- Number: 42

Career history
- 1976–1977: Portland Trail Blazers
- 1977–1982: Seattle SuperSonics
- 1982–1984: Houston Rockets
- 1984–1985: Simac Milano

Career highlights
- Italian League champion (1985); 2× NBA champion (1977, 1979); Second-team All-ACC (1976); ACC tournament MVP (1976); No. 41 retired by Virginia Cavaliers

Career NBA statistics
- Points: 3,968 (7.0 ppg)
- Rebounds: 1,759 (3.1 rpg)
- Assists: 844 (1.5 apg)
- Stats at NBA.com
- Stats at Basketball Reference

Walter Frederick Walker (born July 18, 1954) is an American former professional basketball player. He is best known for his National Basketball Association (NBA) career – both as a player and as a front office executive for the Seattle SuperSonics. He was the No. 5 overall pick of the 1976 NBA draft: selected one pick ahead of Adrian Dantley, and three before Robert Parish. He was a part of all three NBA Western Conference Championships for the Seattle SuperSonics: as a player in the 1978 NBA playoffs and 1979 NBA playoffs, and as President and General Manager of the SuperSonics in the 1996 NBA playoffs.

Today he is the Deputy Athletics Director of the Virginia Cavaliers.

== Collegiate career ==
A prolific frontcourt scorer while in college, Walker led the Virginia Cavaliers to their first Atlantic Coast Conference Tournament championship and its first NCAA tournament berth in 1976.

He was the only Cavalier to receive the Everett Case Award as the ACC Tournament's Most Valuable Player following Virginia's championship run, until Joe Harris in 2014. Enjoying one of the finest individual seasons ever by a Cavalier player during the 1975–76 season, Walker scored 21 points and grabbed seven rebounds in the 1976 tournament championship game against the University of North Carolina.

Walker's scoring average of 22.1 points during the 1975–76 season ranks as the sixth best in Virginia history and his 1,849 career points is sixth on the all-time Cavalier list. He was a first-team Academic All American in 1976. His number 41 was retired by the school. The Portland Trail Blazers took him in the first round of the 1976 draft, the fifth overall pick.

== Professional career ==
His playing career averages in the NBA were 7.0 points, 3.1 rebounds, and 1.5 assists per game in eight years with Portland, Seattle and Houston. He won two championship rings (with Portland and Seattle) in his first and third seasons. He was a starter for the Sonics in 1981–82 and the next season for the Houston Rockets. After ending his NBA career in 1984, Walker played 11 games in Italian Pro League in Milan and then enrolled in Stanford Graduate School of Business, graduating in 1987 with an MBA. He worked for seven years at Goldman Sachs and also started his own money management business, Walker Capital, before returning to the NBA in the early 90s as a part-time television announcer and consultant for his former team, the Seattle SuperSonics, owned by Barry Ackerley.

== Front office ==
Following the 1993-94 NBA season, Walker was named by Ackerley to be President and General Manager of the team. The Sonics continued their run of success for the next four seasons with a roster built primarily around Gary Payton, Shawn Kemp, Detlef Schrempf, Sam Perkins, Nate McMillan and Hersey Hawkins, with Hawkins as a Walker acquisition. In 1997–98, the Sonics won the Pacific Division with a record of 61–21 and Walker finished second in Executive of the Year voting.

The Sonics average cost per win was 6th best in the league at $850 thousand per victory for the 1999–2000 season.

During the 2003 season, Walker engineered a trade with the Bucks for star guard Ray Allen, along with Flip Murray, Kevin Ollie and a first-round pick that became Luke Ridnour, to the Sonics for Gary Payton and Desmond Mason. In 2004–05 the Sonics won the Northwest Division with a record of 52–30, the fourth Division Title that the Sonics won while Walker was team President, with a roster composed exclusively of players he acquired.

During his 12 years as president, the Sonics selected future NBA starters and reserves Eric Snow, Mark Blount and Earl Watson, all in the second round. He signed free agents including Terry Cummings, Aaron Williams, Ruben Patterson, Reggie Evans, Antonio Daniels, Damien Wilkins and Jim McIlvaine, who despite fan derision helped the Sonics win its division in each of his first two years. Walker supervised the drafting of Rashard Lewis, who became an All-Star in 2005. He also served as President of the WNBA Seattle Storm, who won the WNBA championship in 2004.

During the 2005 offseason, following the franchise's first 50-win season in 7 years, popular head coach and former Sonic player Nate McMillan signed a contract with a Northwest rival, the Portland Trail Blazers. A month earlier with the blessing of the Sonics organization, long-time assistant Dwayne Casey, a potential successor as head coach if McMillan were not to re-sign, agreed to be the coach of the Minnesota Timberwolves. Walker and then-GM Rick Sund eventually filled the vacancy with assistant Bob Weiss. Weiss was fired in January of the following season, after going only 13–17. Walker and Sund replaced Weiss with assistant Bob Hill, who coached the team to a 22–30 record.

Walker was part of five of the Sonics' six division-winning teams: one as a player (1978–79); four as team president (1995–96, 1996–97 1997–98, 2004–05). And he is one of only two people—player, coach, and/or member of the front office or staff—to be part of all three of the Sonics' Western Conference Championship seasons (1977–78, 1978–79 and 1995–96); the other person is trainer Frank Furtado.

== Popular culture references ==
Walker is one of five 1970s Seattle SuperSonics players whose names are featured on characters in "The Exterminator," the third episode of Season 1 of iZombie. The other four are Freddie Brown, Gus Williams, Marvin Webster and Don Watts.

== Career statistics ==
Legend
GP	Games played	GS	Games started	MPG	Minutes per game
FG%	Field goal percentage	3P%	3-point field goal percentage	FT%	Free throw percentage
RPG	Rebounds per game	APG	Assists per game	SPG	Steals per game
BPG	Blocks per game	PPG	Points per game	**Bold**	Career high
†	Won an NBA championship

=== NBA ===
==== Regular season ====
Year	Team	GP	GS	MPG	FG%	3P%	FT%	RPG	APG	SPG	BPG	PPG
1976–77†	Portland	66		9.5	.449		.670	1.6	.8	.2	.0	5.2
1977–78	Portland	9		11.2	.463		.625	1.9	.9	.2	.0	4.8
1977–78	Seattle	68		14.8	.440		.625	3.0	1.0	.4	.1	6.5
1978–79†	Seattle	60		16.2	.490		.604	3.0	1.2	.2	**.4**	6.6
1979–80	Seattle	70		12.1	**.507**	–	**.750**	2.4	.8	.3	.1	4.7
1980–81	Seattle	**82**		21.9	.463	.000	.645	3.8	1.5	**.6**	.2	8.4
1981–82	Seattle	70	**70**	**28.1**	.480	.000	.672	4.4	**3.1**	.5	**.4**	**9.9**
1982–83	Houston	**82**	59	27.5	.449	.250	.621	**4.5**	2.4	.5	.3	9.7
1983–84	Houston	58	18	10.6	.490	**.333**	.333	1.6	.9	.3	.1	4.2
Career		565	147	18.0	.467	.200	.643	3.1	1.5	.4	.2	7.0

==== Playoffs ====
Year	Team	GP	MPG	FG%	3P%	FT%	RPG	APG	SPG	BPG	PPG
1977†	Portland	10	8.3	**.556**		.429	.7	.8	.3	.0	4.3
1978	Seattle	**20**	13.1	.424		**.808**	1.9	.6	.4	.2	4.7
1979†	Seattle	13	6.5	.375		.500	1.3	.2	.0	.0	1.1
1980	Seattle	13	12.1	.514	–	.750	2.2	.5	.1	.2	4.2
1982	Seattle	8	**19.6**	.422	–	.250	**4.0**	**1.9**	**.5**	**.5**	**4.9**
Career		64	11.6	.456	–	.692	1.9	.7	.3	.2	3.8

Sporting positions
Preceded by Bob Whitsitt	Seattle SuperSonics General Manager; 1994–2001	Succeeded by Rick Sund
