= 1979–80 San Diego Clippers season =

NBA professional basketball team season

- Head coach: Gene Shue
- Arena: San Diego Sports Arena

Results
- Record: 35–47 (.427)
- Place: Division: 5th (Pacific); Conference: 7th (Western)
- Playoff finish: Did not qualify
- Stats at Basketball Reference

Local media
- Television: KFMB-TV
- Radio: KFMB

The 1979–80 San Diego Clippers season was the Clippers' 10th season in the NBA and their 2nd season in the city of San Diego.

== Draft picks ==
Round	Pick	Player	Position	Nationality	School/Club team
3	55	Tom Channel	Guard	United States	Boston University
4	77	Lionel Garrett	Forward	United States	Southern
5	99	Greg Joyner	Forward	United States	Middle Tennessee State
6	119	Bob Bender	Guard	United States	Duke
7	139	Jene Grey	Forward	United States	LeMoyne
8	158	Renaldo Lawrence	Guard	United States	Appalachian State
9	176	Mike Dodd	Guard	United States	San Diego State
10	194	Greg Hunter	Forward	United States	Loyola Marymount

== Roster ==
1979–80 San Diego Clippers roster
Players

Pos.	No.	Player	Height	Weight	DOB	From
F	27	Marvin Barnes	6 ft 7 in (2.01 m)	225 lb (102 kg)		Providence
F	23	Joe Bryant	6 ft 7 in (2.01 m)	215 lb (98 kg)		Penn
G	24	Lloyd Free	6 ft 2 in (1.88 m)	185 lb (84 kg)		Guilford
G	43	Greg Lee (injured)	6 ft 5 in (1.96 m)	195 lb (88 kg)		UCLA
C	31	Swen Nater	6 ft 11 in (2.11 m)	240 lb (109 kg)		UCLA
F	22	Stan Pietkiewicz	6 ft 5 in (1.96 m)	200 lb (91 kg)		Auburn
G	7	Bingo Smith	6 ft 5 in (1.96 m)	212 lb (96 kg)		Tulsa
G	14	Brian Taylor	6 ft 2 in (1.88 m)	185 lb (84 kg)		Princeton
C	32	Bill Walton	6 ft 11 in (2.11 m)	235 lb (107 kg)		UCLA
F	12	Nick Weatherspoon	6 ft 7 in (2.01 m)	197 lb (89 kg)		Illinois
F	21	Sidney Wicks	6 ft 9 in (2.06 m)	225 lb (102 kg)		UCLA
G	20	Freeman Williams	6 ft 4 in (1.93 m)	185 lb (84 kg)		Portland State

Coaches
Head coach
- Gene Shue
Assistant(s)
- Bob Weiss

Legend
- (DP) Unsigned draft pick
- (FA) Free agent
- (S) Suspended
- Injured

=== Roster notes ===
- This is Marvin Barnes' second tour of duty with the franchise. He previously played for the Buffalo Braves back in 1977–1978.

== Regular season ==
=== Game log ===
1979-80 Regular Season Game Log (35–47) (Home: 24–17; Road: 11–30)
October (4–7) (Home: 4–4; Road: 0–3)

Game	Date	Team	Score	High points	High rebounds	High assists	Location Attendance	Record	Report
1	October 12	Lakers	L 102–103	Lloyd Free (46)	Nick Weatherspoon (9)	Lloyd Free (5)	San Diego Sports Arena; 8,503	0–1	
2	October 14	SuperSonics	W 98–93	Lloyd Free (35)	Swen Nater (16)	Tied (4)	San Diego Sports Arena; 7,242	1–1	
3	October 16	@ Trail Blazers	L 94–98	Lloyd Free (24)	Swen Nater (16)	Lloyd Free (4)	Memorial Coliseum; 12,666	1–2	
4	October 18	Bulls	W 111–107	Lloyd Free (32)	Swen Nater (14)	Brian Taylor (7)	San Diego Sports Arena; 6,844	2–2	
5	October 19	@ SuperSonics	L 98–106	Lloyd Free (41)	Swen Nater (18)	Tied (4)	Kingdome; 16,614	2–3	
6	October 22	@ Jazz	L 109–110	Lloyd Free (33)	Swen Nater (13)	World B. Free (4)	Salt Palace; 6,122	2–4	
7	October 23	Nuggets	W 132–127	Lloyd Free (32)	Swen Nater (12)	Tied (7)	San Diego Sports Arena; 6,660	3–4	
8	October 25	Bucks	L 115–118	Lloyd Free (30)	Swen Nater (15)	Tied (5)	San Diego Sports Arena; 6,617	3–5	
9	October 27	SuperSonics	W 110–105	Lloyd Free (33)	Nick Weatherspoon (9)	Lloyd Free (9)	San Diego Sports Arena; 7,224	4–5	
10	October 28	Kings	L 101–106	Joe Bryant (23)	Swen Nater (13)	Lloyd Free (5)	San Diego Sports Arena; 7,081	4–6	
11	October 31	Spurs	L 123–130	Lloyd Free (35)	Swen Nater (21)	Lloyd Free (6)	San Diego Sports Arena; 7,044	4–7	

November (6–8) (Home: 5–3; Road: 2–5)

Game	Date	Team	Score	High points	High rebounds	High assists	Location Attendance	Record	Report
12	November 2	Trail Blazers	L 102–123	Freeman Williams (29)	Swen Nater (12)	Brian Taylor (4)	San Diego Sports Arena; 7,319	4–8	
13	November 3	Jazz	W 126–109	Lloyd Free (28)	Swen Nater (19)	Swen Nater (10)	San Diego Sports Arena; 6,428	5–8	
14	November 6	@ Lakers	L 112–127	Lloyd Free (29)	Swen Nater (15)	Joe Bryant (7)	The Forum; 12,817	5–9	
15	November 7	@ Suns	W 114–102	Lloyd Free (45)	Swen Nater (13)	Lloyd Free (5)	Arizona Veterans Memorial Coliseum; 11,097	6–9	
16	November 9	@ Bulls	L 92–107	Freeman Williams (26)	Swen Nater (16)	Lloyd Free (7)	Chicago Stadium; 8,014	6–10	
17	November 10	@ Bucks	L 104–133	Freeman Williams (33)	Swen Nater (15)	Tied (6)	MECCA Arena; 10,938	6–11	
18	November 13	Lakers	L 91–137	Swen Nater (15)	Swen Nater (10)	Brian Taylor (7)	San Diego Sports Arena; 9,068	6–12	
19	November 16	Pacers	W 105–97	Freeman Williams (35)	Swen Nater (15)	Brian Taylor (6)	San Diego Sports Arena; 7,221	7–12	
20	November 18	Bucks	W 112–96	Brian Taylor (23)	Swen Nater (21)	Brian Taylor (9)	San Diego Sports Arena; 6,342	8–12	
21	November 20	Suns	W 117–110	Brian Taylor (28)	Swen Nater (15)	Lloyd Free (6)	San Diego Sports Arena; 6,992	9–12	
22	November 21	@ Nuggets	L 84–105	Lloyd Free (27)	Tied (11)	Joe Bryant (5)	McNichols Sports Arena; 5,922	9–13	
23	November 23	Kings	L 91–107	Lloyd Free (32)	Swen Nater (14)	Lloyd Free (3)	San Diego Sports Arena; 6,940	9–14	
24	November 27	Bulls	W 128–103	Lloyd Free (23)	Swen Nater (16)	Tied (7)	San Diego Sports Arena; 8,075	10–14	
25	November 28	@ Warriors	W 114–108	Lloyd Free (28)	Swen Nater (17)	Brian Taylor (9)	Oakland-Alameda County Coliseum Arena; 10,726	11–14	
26	November 30	@ 76ers	L 101–104	Lloyd Free (29)	Swen Nater (16)	Brian Taylor (7)	The Spectrum; 10,726	11–15	

December (9–6) (Home: 5–2; Road: 4–4)

Game	Date	Team	Score	High points	High rebounds	High assists	Location Attendance	Record	Report
27	December 1	@ Hawks	L 96–106	Lloyd Free (35)	Joe Bryant (12)	Joe Bryant (5)	Omni Coliseum; 9,373	11–16	
28	December 4	@ Cavaliers	L 112–115	Lloyd Free (28)	Swen Nater (15)	Freeman Williams (5)	Richfield Coliseum; 7,155	11–17	
29	December 6	Warriors	W 105–103	Lloyd Free (30)	Swen Nater (11)	Brian Taylor (6)	San Diego Sports Arena; 8,664	12–17	
30	December 7	@ Lakers	W 116–108	Lloyd Free (42)	Swen Nater (27)	Tied (4)	The Forum; 12,222	13–17	
31	December 9	@ Trail Blazers	W 98–96	Lloyd Free (25)	Swen Nater (16)	Lloyd Free (6)	Memorial Coliseum; 12,666	14–17	
32	December 12	Rockets	L 107–118	Lloyd Free (29)	Swen Nater (17)	Tied (3)	San Diego Sports Arena; 6,756	14–18	
33	December 14	Nuggets	W 112–108	Lloyd Free (37)	Swen Nater (32)	Lloyd Free (7)	San Diego Sports Arena; 6,684	15–18	
34	December 16	Pistons	W 113–124	Lloyd Free (49)	Swen Nater (15)	Tied (5)	San Diego Sports Arena; 7,571	16–18	
35	December 18	@ Kings	L 96–110	Lloyd Free (25)	Swen Nater (8)	Tied (3)	Municipal Auditorium; 6,935	16–19	
36	December 20	Knicks	W 128–118	Lloyd Free (32)	Swen Nater (17)	Sidney Wicks (6)	San Diego Sports Arena; 6,843	17–19	
37	December 21	@ Jazz	W 110–98	Freeman Williams (28)	Joe Bryant (9)	Sidney Wicks (7)	Salt Palace; 5,141	18–19	
38	December 23	Jazz	W 124–118 OT	Lloyd Free (41)	Swen Nater (22)	Lloyd Free (8)	San Diego Sports Arena; 6,548	19–19	
39	December 26	@ SuperSonics	L 104–124	Brian Taylor (28)	Swen Nater (10)	Sidney Wicks (10)	Kingdome; 24,958	19–20	
40	December 27	Celtics	L 97–118	Lloyd Free (28)	Swen Nater (15)	Freeman Williams (3)	San Diego Sports Arena; 13,841	19–21	
41	December 29	@ Bullets	W 93–90	Freeman Williams (24)	Swen Nater (17)	Tied (3)	Capital Centre; 15,989	20–21	

January (8–8) (Home: 5–0; Road: 3–8)

Game	Date	Team	Score	High points	High rebounds	High assists	Location Attendance	Record	Report
42	January 2	@ Nets	W 103–97	Lloyd Free (31)	Swen Nater (23)	Freeman Williams (7)	Rutgers Athletic Center; 5,204	21–21	
43	January 3	@ Knicks	L 114–107	Lloyd Free (30)	Freeman Williams (8)	Tied (4)	Madison Square Garden; 11,375	21–22	
44	January 4	@ Bulls	L 118–121	Lloyd Free (38)	Swen Nater (11)	Brian Taylor (9)	Chicago Stadium; 10,538	21–23	
45	January 6	SuperSonics	W 105–103	Lloyd Free (34)	Swen Nater (17)	Tied (7)	San Diego Sports Arena; 7,622	22–23	
46	January 8	@ Kings	W 124–116	Lloyd Free (33)	Swen Nater (26)	Tied (4)	Municipal Auditorium; 7,387	23–23	
47	January 9	@ Bucks	W 111–107	Lloyd Free (33)	Swen Nater (14)	Lloyd Free (7)	MECCA Arena; 10,938	24–23	
48	January 11	Warriors	W 116–112	Lloyd Free (39)	Swen Nater (16)	Brian Taylor (5)	San Diego Sports Arena; 8,165	25–23	
49	January 12	Jazz	W 119–102	Lloyd Free (32)	Swen Nater (28)	Lloyd Free (7)	San Diego Sports Arena; 9,287	26–23	
50	January 16	Hawks	W 111–108	Lloyd Free (33)	Swen Nater (16)	Tied (4)	San Diego Sports Arena; 11,266	27–23	
51	January 18	@ Warriors	L 91–92	Lloyd Free (32)	Swen Nater (17)	Brian Taylor (7)	Oakland-Alameda County Coliseum Arena; 7,741	27–24	
52	January 19	@ Suns	L 123–137	Freeman Williams (51)	Nick Weatherspoon (8)	Stan Pietkiewicz (8)	Arizona Veterans Memorial Coliseum; 12,660	27–25	
53	January 22	@ Spurs	L 109–129	Freeman Williams (21)	Sidney Wicks (11)	Sidney Wicks (8)	HemisFair Arena; 10,049	27–26	
54	January 23	@ Rockets	L 110–111 2OT	Lloyd Free (33)	Swen Nater (23)	Lloyd Free (9)	The Summit; 7,159	27–27	
55	January 25	@ Pacers	L 117–139	Lloyd Free (27)	Swen Nater (16)	Lloyd Free (7)	Market Square Arena; 8,794	27–28	
56	January 27	@ Celtics	L 108–131	Lloyd Free (35)	Swen Nater (11)	Tied (4)	Boston Garden; 15,320	27–29	
57	January 29	Suns	W 133–121	Lloyd Free (32)	Swen Nater (21)	Swen Nater (8)	San Diego Sports Arena; 11,428	28–29	

February (3–8) (Home: 2–3; Road: 1–5)

Game	Date	Team	Score	High points	High rebounds	High assists	Location Attendance	Record	Report
58	February 6	@ Warriors	L 117–92	Freeman Williams (29)	Swen Nater (11)	Stan Pietkiewicz (5)	Oakland-Alameda County Coliseum Arena; 8,380	28–30	
59	February 8	Trail Blazers	W 118–104	Freeman Williams (29)	Joe Bryant (12)	Tied (7)	San Diego Sports Arena; 12,715	29–30	
60	February 9	@ Nuggets	L 104–123	Freeman Williams (33)	Swen Nater (18)	Stan Pietkiewicz (7)	McNichols Sports Arena; 14,662	29–31	
61	February 13	Bullets	L 103–108	Lloyd Free (28)	Swen Nater (15)	Brian Taylor (8)	San Diego Sports Arena; 9,472	29–32	
62	February 17	Kings	L 107–108	Lloyd Free (24)	Swen Nater (10)	Brian Taylor (6)	San Diego Sports Arena; 9,114	29–33	
63	February 19	Nets	L 113–123	Freeman Williams (24)	Swen Nater (10)	Brian Taylor (6)	San Diego Sports Arena; 11,709	29–34	
64	February 21	76ers	W 104–99	Lloyd Free (24)	Swen Nater (16)	Tied (3)	San Diego Sports Arena; 13,472	30–34	
65	February 24	@ Bulls	L 102–110	Lloyd Free (35)	Swen Nater (10)	Bill Walton (6)	Chicago Stadium; 7,257	30–35	
66	February 26	@ Bucks	L 88–122	Lloyd Free (21)	Swen Nater (15)	Lloyd Free (4)	MECCA Arena; 10,938	30–36	
67	February 27	@ Pistons	W 129–113	Lloyd Free (42)	Bill Walton (13)	Tied (7)	Pontiac Silverdome; 5,229	31–36	
68	February 29	@ Kings	L 93–98	Lloyd Free (34)	Tied (13)	Lloyd Free (4)	Checkerdome; 10,561	31–37	

March (4–10) (Home: 3–5; Road: 1–5)

Game	Date	Team	Score	High points	High rebounds	High assists	Location Attendance	Record	Report
69	March 2	Bucks	L 98–101	Lloyd Free (22)	Swen Nater (14)	Swen Nater (3)	San Diego Sports Arena; 13,841	31–38	
70	March 4	Cavaliers	W 116–105	Lloyd Free (24)	Swen Nater (19)	Tied (5)	San Diego Sports Arena; 9,024	32–38	
71	March 8	@ Jazz	W 113–98	Lloyd Free (38)	Bill Walton (15)	Tied (4)	Salt Palace; 9,462	33–38	
72	March 9	Warriors	L 107–125	Lloyd Free (26)	Swen Nater (13)	Swen Nater (8)	San Diego Sports Arena; 7,560	33–39	
73	March 11	Lakers	L 106–123	Lloyd Free (32)	Swen Nater (16)	Tied (4)	San Diego Sports Arena; 13,841	33–40	
74	March 13	Nuggets	W 116–102	Lloyd Free (26)	Swen Nater (22)	Brian Taylor (8)	San Diego Sports Arena; 6,798	34–40	
75	March 15	Suns	W 120–109	Lloyd Free (44)	Swen Nater (16)	Tied (6)	San Diego Sports Arena; 10,635	35–40	
76	March 16	@ Nuggets	L 107–127	Lloyd Free (29)	Swen Nater (18)	Lloyd Free (4)	McNichols Sports Arena; 12,497	35–41	
77	March 18	Bulls	L 101–115	Swen Nater (24)	Swen Nater (10)	Brian Taylor (7)	San Diego Sports Arena; 8,731	35–42	
78	March 21	@ SuperSonics	L 104–107	Freeman Williams (21)	Swen Nater (9)	Tied (7)	Kingdome; 22,695	35–43	
79	March 23	@ Trail Blazers	L 91–98	Freeman Williams (25)	Swen Nater (13)	Swen Nater (9)	Memorial Coliseum; 12,666	35–44	
80	March 27	Trail Blazers	L 93–96	Swen Nater (24)	Swen Nater (19)	Swen Nater (5)	San Diego Sports Arena; 10,863	35–45	
81	March 28	@ Lakers	L 88–126	Freeman Williams (20)	Swen Nater (23)	Sidney Wicks (10)	The Forum; 17,505	35–46	
82	March 30	@ Suns	L 104–122	Freeman Williams (24)	Swen Nater (19)	Tied (7)	Arizona Veterans Memorial Coliseum; 10,807	35–47	

=== Season standings ===
Pacific Division	W	L	PCT	GB	Home	Road	Div
y-Los Angeles Lakers	60	22	.732	–	37–4	23–18	19–11
x-Seattle SuperSonics	56	26	.683	4	33–8	23–18	18–12
x-Phoenix Suns	55	27	.671	5	37–5	18–22	19–11
x-Portland Trail Blazers	38	44	.463	22	26–15	12–29	13–17
San Diego Clippers	35	47	.427	25	24–17	11–30	13–17
Golden State Warriors	24	58	.293	36	15–26	9–32	8–22

#	Western Conference				
#	Team	W	L	PCT	GB
1	c-Los Angeles Lakers	60	22	.732	–
2	y-Milwaukee Bucks	49	33	.598	11
3	x-Seattle SuperSonics	56	26	.683	4
4	x-Phoenix Suns	55	27	.671	5
5	x-Kansas City Kings	47	35	.573	13
6	x-Portland Trail Blazers	38	44	.463	22
7	San Diego Clippers	35	47	.427	25
8	Chicago Bulls	30	52	.366	30
9	Denver Nuggets	30	52	.366	30
10	Utah Jazz	24	58	.293	36
11	Golden State Warriors	24	58	.293	36

Notes

- z, y – division champions
- x – clinched playoff spot

== Player statistics ==
Legend
GP	Games played	GS	Games started	MPG	Minutes per game
FG%	Field-goal percentage	3P%	3-point field-goal percentage	FT%	Free-throw percentage
RPG	Rebounds per game	APG	Assists per game	SPG	Steals per game
BPG	Blocks per game	PPG	Points per game

Player	GP	MPG	FG%	3FG%	FT%	RPG	APG	SPG	BPG	PPG
Lloyd Free	68	38.0	.474	.360	.753	3.5	4.2	1.2	0.5	30.2
Swen Nater	81	35.3	.554†	.000	.718	15.0	2.9	0.6	0.5	13.4
Brian Taylor	78	35.3	.467	.377	.802	2.4	4.3	1.9	0.3	13.5
Sidney Wicks	71	30.2	.423	.000	.546	5.8	3.0	1.1	0.7	7.1
Joe Bryant	81	28.7	.431	.147	.742	6.4	1.8	1.3	0.5	9.3
Bingo Smith	70	28.4	.430	.289	.869	3.5	1.3	0.8	0.2	11.7
Freeman Williams	82	25.8	.480	.328	.815	2.3	2.0	0.9	0.1	18.6
Bill Walton	14	24.1	.503	.000	.593	9.0	2.4	0.6	2.7	13.9
Nick Weatherspoon	57	19.7	.434	NA	.692	3.6	0.9	0.6	0.3	6.9
John Olive	1	15.0	.000	NA	.000	1.0	0.0	0.0	0.0	0.0
Marvin Barnes	20	14.4	.400	NA	.500	3.9	0.9	0.3	0.6	3.2
Bob Carrington	10	13.4	.405	.000	.750	1.3	0.3	0.4	0.1	3.6
Jerome Whitehead	18	12.5	.600†	NA	.278	3.9	0.3	0.1	0.3	3.3
Stan Pietkiewicz	50	11.5	.508	.250	.804	0.9	1.9	0.5	0.1	4.6
Steve Malovic	28	9.9	.548	NA	.778	2.1	0.4	0.2	0.0	1.9

== Awards, records and milestones ==
=== Awards ===
==== All-Star ====
- Lloyd Free selected as a reserve guard for the Western Conference All-Stars. Free would be the first and only San Diego Clipper All-Star.

=== Records ===
- Swen Nater sets a franchise record of total rebounds in a single season with 1,216. This record will not be broken until 35 years later by DeAndre Jordan with 1,226 rebounds.

== Transactions ==
The Clippers were involved in the following transactions during the 1979–80 season.

=== Trades ===
May 13, 1979
To San Diego Clippers

- The right to sign Bill Walton as a veteran free agent
To Portland Trail Blazers

- Kermit Washington, Kevin Kunnert, & a 1980 first round draft pick as compensation.
September 21, 1979
To San Diego Clippers

- A 1980 first round draft pick
To Cleveland Cavaliers

- Randy Smith
October 6, 1979
To San Diego Clippers

- Joe Bryant
To Philadelphia 76ers

- 1986 first round draft pick
October 27, 1979
To San Diego Clippers

- Bingo Smith
To Cleveland Cavaliers

- 1980 third round draft pick
November 21, 1979
To San Diego Clippers

- Steve Malovic
To Washington Bullets

- 1982 second round draft pick

=== Free agents ===
==== Additions ====
Player	Signed	Former team
Bob Carrington	June 15	Tucson Gunners (WBA)
Bill Walton	September 18	Portland Trail Blazers
Greg Lee	September 25	TuS Bayer 04 Leverkusen (BBL)
Marvin Barnes	September 30 waived, October 10 signed as free agent, January 30	Boston Celtics

==== Subtractions ====
Player	Left	New team
Bob Bigelow	free agency, July 1	Retired
Bob Carrington	waived, November 19	Retired
John Olive	waived, November 26	Alberta Dusters (CBA)
Jerome Whitehead	waived, December 4	Utah Jazz
Steve Malovic	waived, February 19	Detroit Pistons
