= 1979–80 Portland Trail Blazers season =

NBA professional basketball team season

- Head coach: Jack Ramsay
- General manager: Harry Glickman
- Owner: Larry Weinberg
- Arena: Memorial Coliseum

Results
- Record: 38–44 (.463)
- Place: Division: 4th (Pacific); Conference: 6th (Western)
- Playoff finish: First round (lost to SuperSonics 1–2)
- Stats at Basketball Reference

Local media
- Television: KOIN
- Radio: KEX

The 1979–80 Portland Trail Blazers season was the 10th season of the Portland Trail Blazers in the National Basketball Association (NBA). The Blazers lost seven more games than the previous season, ending with a record of 38–44, their first losing record since the 1975–76 season; despite that, they qualified for the playoffs for the fourth consecutive season.

The Blazers were ousted from the 1980 NBA Playoffs after losing their best-of-three series to the Seattle SuperSonics, two games to one.

The Blazers' season was documented in the 1981 book The Breaks of the Game by journalist David Halberstam. The Breaks of the Game was a New York Times best-seller and is considered one of the greatest sports books ever written.

== Draft picks ==
Note: This is not a complete list; only the first two rounds are covered, as well as any other picks by the franchise who played at least one NBA game.

Round	Pick	Player	Position	Nationality	School/Club team
1	12	Jim Paxson	G/F	United States	Dayton
2	40	Andrew Fields	F	United States	Cheyney State

== Roster ==
1979–80 Portland Trail Blazers roster
Players

Pos.	No.	Player	Height	Weight	DOB	From
G	12	Billy Ray Bates	6 ft 4 in (1.93 m)	210 lb (95 kg)	1956–05–31	Kentucky State
PF	52	Jim Brewer	6 ft 9 in (2.06 m)	210 lb (95 kg)	1951–12–02	Minnesota
G	10	Ron Brewer	6 ft 4 in (1.93 m)	180 lb (82 kg)	1955–07–16	Arkansas
F	30	Bob Gross	6 ft 6 in (1.98 m)	200 lb (91 kg)	1953–08–03	Long Beach State
F	11	Abdul Jeelani	6 ft 8 in (2.03 m)	210 lb (95 kg)	1954–02–10	UW–Parkside
C	44	Kevin Kunnert (injured)	6 ft 9 in (2.06 m)	230 lb (104 kg)	1951–11–11	Iowa
SF	33	Calvin Natt	6 ft 6 in (1.98 m)	220 lb (100 kg)	1957–01–08	Louisiana–Monroe
F/C	25	Tom Owens	6 ft 10 in (2.08 m)	215 lb (98 kg)	1949–06–28	South Carolina
G	4	Jim Paxson	6 ft 6 in (1.98 m)	200 lb (91 kg)	1957–07–09	Dayton
F	15	Larry Steele	6 ft 5 in (1.96 m)	180 lb (82 kg)	1949–05–05	Kentucky
F/C	43	Mychal Thompson (injured) (IN)	6 ft 10 in (2.08 m)	226 lb (103 kg)	1955–01–30	Minnesota
G	13	Dave Twardzik	6 ft 1 in (1.85 m)	175 lb (79 kg)	1950–09–20	Old Dominion
F	42	Kermit Washington	6 ft 8 in (2.03 m)	230 lb (104 kg)	1951–09–17	American

Coaches
Head coach
- Jack Ramsay
Assistant(s)
- Bucky Buckwalter

Legend
- (DP) Unsigned draft pick
- (FA) Free agent
- (S) Suspended
- Injured

== Regular season ==
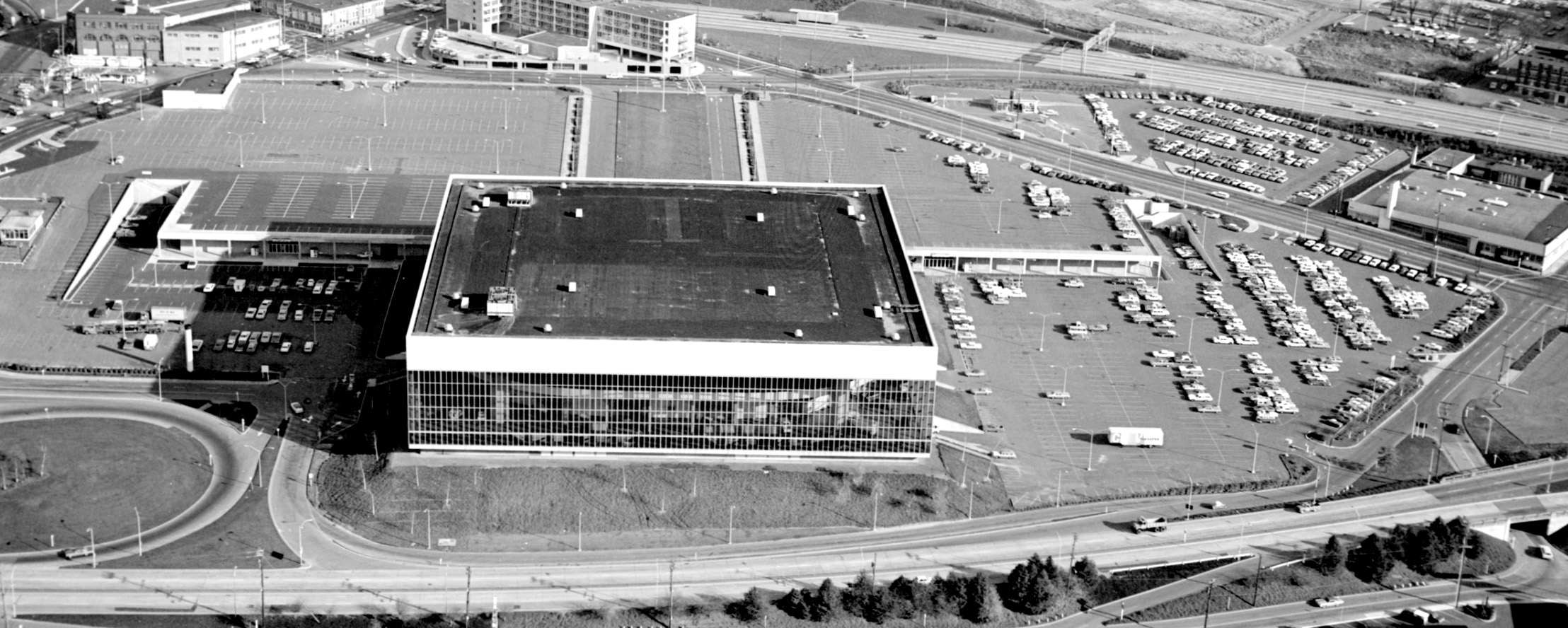
The Trail Blazers played their home games at Veterans Memorial Coliseum.

=== Season standings ===
Pacific Division	W	L	PCT	GB	Home	Road	Div
y-Los Angeles Lakers	60	22	.732	–	37–4	23–18	19–11
x-Seattle SuperSonics	56	26	.683	4	33–8	23–18	18–12
x-Phoenix Suns	55	27	.671	5	37–5	18–22	19–11
x-Portland Trail Blazers	38	44	.463	22	26–15	12–29	13–17
San Diego Clippers	35	47	.427	25	24–17	11–30	13–17
Golden State Warriors	24	58	.293	36	15–26	9–32	8–22

#	Western Conference				
#	Team	W	L	PCT	GB
1	c-Los Angeles Lakers	60	22	.732	–
2	y-Milwaukee Bucks	49	33	.598	11
3	x-Seattle SuperSonics	56	26	.683	4
4	x-Phoenix Suns	55	27	.671	5
5	x-Kansas City Kings	47	35	.573	13
6	x-Portland Trail Blazers	38	44	.463	22
7	San Diego Clippers	35	47	.427	25
8	Chicago Bulls	30	52	.366	30
9	Denver Nuggets	30	52	.366	30
10	Utah Jazz	24	58	.293	36
11	Golden State Warriors	24	58	.293	36

z - clinched division title
y - clinched division title
x - clinched playoff spot

== Playoffs ==
1980 playoff game log
First round: 1–2 (home: 1–0; road: 0–2)

Game	Date	Team	Score	High points	High rebounds	High assists	Location Attendance	Series
1	April 2	@ Seattle	L 110–120	Ron Brewer (24)	Kermit Washington (7)	Kermit Washington (12)	Kingdome; 26,412	0–1
2	April 4	Seattle	W 105–95 (OT)	Natt, R. Brewer (27)	Jim Brewer (12)	T. R. Dunn (4)	Memorial Coliseum; 12,666	1–1
3	April 6	@ Seattle	L 86–103	Billy Ray Bates (26)	Tom Owens (16)	Billy Ray Bates (3)	Kingdome; 23,546	1–2

1980 schedule

== Awards and honors ==
- Calvin Natt, All-NBA Rookie Team
- Kermit Washington, NBA All-Defensive Second Team
