= Jeff Cook (basketball) =

American basketball player

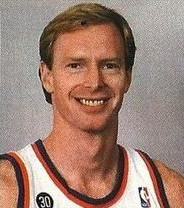
- Cook in 1987

Personal information
- Born: October 21, 1956 (age 70) West Covina, California, U.S.
- Listed height: 6 ft 10 in (2.08 m)
- Listed weight: 215 lb (98 kg)

Career information
- High school: Edgewood (West Covina, California)
- College: Idaho State (1974–1978)
- NBA draft: 1978: 3rd round, 49th overall pick
- Drafted by: Kansas City Kings
- Playing career: 1978–1991
- Position: Power forward / center
- Number: 45, 44, 12

Career history
- 1978–1979: Washington Lumberjacks
- 1979–1983: Phoenix Suns
- 1983–1984: Cleveland Cavaliers
- 1983–1986: San Antonio Spurs
- 1986: Utah Jazz
- 1986–1987: Boston Livorno
- 1987–1988: Phoenix Suns
- 1989–1990: Panathinaikos
- 1990–1991: AS Monaco

Career highlights
- First-team All-Big Sky (1978); Second-team All-Big Sky (1977)

Career NBA statistics
- Points: 2,734 (5.3 ppg)
- Rebounds: 2,334 (4.5 rpg)
- Assists: 707 (1.4 apg)
- Stats at NBA.com
- Stats at Basketball Reference

Jeffrey James Cook (born October 21, 1956) is an American former professional basketball player.

A 6'10" center from Idaho State University, Cook played in the National Basketball Association (NBA) from 1979 to 1988 as a member of the Phoenix Suns, Cleveland Cavaliers, San Antonio Spurs, and Utah Jazz. He averaged 5.3 points and 4.5 rebounds in his NBA career.

== Career statistics ==
Legend
GP	Games played	GS	Games started	MPG	Minutes per game
FG%	Field goal percentage	3P%	3-point field goal percentage	FT%	Free throw percentage
RPG	Rebounds per game	APG	Assists per game	SPG	Steals per game
BPG	Blocks per game	PPG	Points per game	**Bold**	Career high

=== NBA ===
==== Regular season ====
Year	Team	GP	GS	MPG	FG%	3P%	FT%	RPG	APG	SPG	BPG	PPG
1979–80	Phoenix	66		13.7	.469	.000	.806	3.7	1.3	.4	.3	5.5
1980–81	Phoenix	79		**27.7**	.464	.000	.645	5.9	**2.5**	**1.0**	**.7**	**8.5**
1981–82	Phoenix	76	**22**	17.1	.422	.000	.664	4.0	1.3	.5	.3	5.1
1982–83	Phoenix	45	2	12.2	.430	.000	.759	2.9	1.3	.3	.3	3.6
1982–83	Cleveland	30	20	26.1	**.537**	.000	.760	**6.9**	1.5	.9	.6	7.1
1983–84	Cleveland	**81**	21	24.1	.486	**.500**	.723	6.0	1.5	.8	.6	5.8
1984–85	Cleveland	18	3	24.4	.438	.000	.630	5.8	1.3	.3	.5	6.1
1984–85	San Antonio	54	2	15.7	.529	–	.811	3.9	.7	.5	.3	4.0
1985–86	San Antonio	34	0	10.5	.418	.000	.634	2.4	.6	.4	.3	2.4
1985–86	Utah	2	0	8.5	.500	–	**1.000**	2.5	.0	.0	.0	3.5
1987–88	Phoenix	33	0	10.9	.237	.000	.821	3.2	.4	.3	.2	1.5
Career		518	70	18.7	.462	.056	.716	4.5	1.4	.6	.4	5.3

==== Playoffs ====
Year	Team	GP	GS	MPG	FG%	3P%	FT%	RPG	APG	SPG	BPG	PPG
1980	Phoenix	**7**		14.0	**.667**	–	**.846**	3.0	1.0	.6	.3	7.7
1981	Phoenix	**7**		**29.4**	.463	**1.000**	.737	**6.7**	**1.6**	.1	.0	**9.3**
1982	Phoenix	**7**		6.4	.500	–	–	1.3	1.0	.3	.3	1.1
1985	San Antonio	5	0	19.6	.500	.000	.680	5.8	.8	**1.0**	**1.2**	7.0
1986	Utah	4	0	5.3	.250	–	.750	1.3	.5	.0	.0	1.3
Career		30	0	15.6	.509	.500	.757	3.7	1.0	.4	.3	5.6
