= 1979–80 Phoenix Suns season =

NBA team season

- Head coach: John MacLeod
- General manager: Jerry Colangelo
- Owners: Karl Eller, Don Pitt, Don Diamond, Bhavik Darji, Marvin Meyer, Richard L. Bloch
- Arena: Arizona Veterans Memorial Coliseum

Results
- Record: 55–27 (.671)
- Place: Division: 3rd (Pacific); Conference: 4th (Western)
- Playoff finish: Conference semifinals (lost to Lakers 1–4)
- Stats at Basketball Reference

Local media
- Television: KPNX
- Radio: KTAR

The 1979–80 Phoenix Suns season was the 12th season for the Phoenix Suns of the National Basketball Association and at 55–27, the team's best regular season record since the franchise's inception. The Suns defeated Western Conference foe Kansas City in the opening round of the playoffs, marking the first time the Suns had won a playoff series in back-to-back seasons. In the Western Conference semifinals, the Suns would lose to the Pacific-winning Los Angeles Lakers, who later went on to win the season's championship. The Suns were led by head coach John MacLeod, his seventh season with the team, and played all home games in Arizona Veterans Memorial Coliseum.

Paul Westphal led the Suns in scoring with a 21.9 point-per-game average and earned All-NBA First Team honors, while Walter Davis was second in team scoring with a 21.5 average. Both Westphal and Davis would return as selections to the All-Star Game. Truck Robinson and Alvan Adams provided an inside presence, averaging 17 and 15 points per game to go with nine and eight rebounds each. Robinson would play in just three of the eight Suns' playoff games, however.

== Offseason ==
=== NBA draft ===
Round	Pick	Player	Position	Nationality	College
1	22	Kyle Macy	Guard	United States	Kentucky
2	24	Johnny High	Guard	United States	Nevada
3	64	Al Green	Guard	United States	Louisiana State
4	86	Malcolm Cesare	Forward	United States	Florida
5	107	Mark Eaton	Center	United States	Cypress JC
6	127	Dale Shackelford	Forward	United States	Syracuse
7	147	Ollie Matson	Forward	United States	Pepperdine
8	165	Charles Jones	Center	United States	Albany State
9	183	Hosea Champine	Guard	United States	Robert Morris
10	201	Korky Nelson	Center	United States	Santa Clara

== Roster ==
1979–80 Phoenix Suns roster
Players

Pos.	No.	Player	Height	Weight	DOB	From
F/C	33	Alvan Adams	6 ft 9 in (2.06 m)	210 lb (95 kg)	1954-07-19	Oklahoma
G	23	Mike Bratz	6 ft 2 in (1.88 m)	185 lb (84 kg)	1955-10-17	Stanford
G	10	Don Buse	6 ft 4 in (1.93 m)	190 lb (86 kg)	1950-08-10	Evansville
F/C	45	Jeff Cook	6 ft 10 in (2.08 m)	215 lb (98 kg)	1956-10-21	Idaho State
G/F	6	Walter Davis	6 ft 6 in (1.98 m)	193 lb (88 kg)	1954-09-09	North Carolina
C	35	Bayard Forrest (injured) (IN)	6 ft 10 in (2.08 m)	235 lb (107 kg)	1954-07-08	Grand Canyon
F	24	Garfield Heard	6 ft 6 in (1.98 m)	219 lb (99 kg)	1948-05-03	Oklahoma
G	22	Johnny High	6 ft 3 in (1.91 m)	185 lb (84 kg)	1957-04-25	Nevada
C	53	Rich Kelley	7 ft 0 in (2.13 m)	235 lb (107 kg)	1953-03-23	Stanford
F	50	Joel Kramer (injured)	6 ft 7 in (2.01 m)	203 lb (92 kg)	1955-11-30	San Diego State
F	21	Leonard Robinson	6 ft 7 in (2.01 m)	225 lb (102 kg)	1951-10-04	Tennessee State
F	14	Alvin Scott	6 ft 7 in (2.01 m)	185 lb (84 kg)	1955-09-14	Oral Roberts
G	44	Paul Westphal	6 ft 4 in (1.93 m)	195 lb (88 kg)	1950-11-30	USC

Coaches
Head coach
- John MacLeod
Assistant(s)
- Al Bianchi
- John Wetzel

Legend
- (DP) Unsigned draft pick
- (FA) Free agent
- (S) Suspended
- Injured

== Regular season ==
=== Standings ===
Pacific Division	W	L	PCT	GB	Home	Road	Div
y-Los Angeles Lakers	60	22	.732	–	37–4	23–18	19–11
x-Seattle SuperSonics	56	26	.683	4	33–8	23–18	18–12
x-Phoenix Suns	55	27	.671	5	37–5	18–22	19–11
x-Portland Trail Blazers	38	44	.463	22	26–15	12–29	13–17
San Diego Clippers	35	47	.427	25	24–17	11–30	13–17
Golden State Warriors	24	58	.293	36	15–26	9–32	8–22

#	Western Conference				
#	Team	W	L	PCT	GB
1	c-Los Angeles Lakers	60	22	.732	–
2	y-Milwaukee Bucks	49	33	.598	11
3	x-Seattle SuperSonics	56	26	.683	4
4	x-Phoenix Suns	55	27	.671	5
5	x-Kansas City Kings	47	35	.573	13
6	x-Portland Trail Blazers	38	44	.463	22
7	San Diego Clippers	35	47	.427	25
8	Chicago Bulls	30	52	.366	30
9	Denver Nuggets	30	52	.366	30
10	Utah Jazz	24	58	.293	36
11	Golden State Warriors	24	58	.293	36

=== Game log ===
1979–80 game log
Total: 55–27 (home: 36–5; road: 19–22)
October: 7–4 (home: 4–1; road: 3–3)

Game	Date	Team	Score	High points	Location Attendance	Record	Streak
1	October 12	Golden State	W 97–89	Paul Westphal (25)	Arizona Veterans Memorial Coliseum; 11,785	1–0	W 1
2	October 14	Chicago	W 112–102	Walter Davis (20)	Arizona Veterans Memorial Coliseum; 10,039	2–0	W 2
3	October 16	Seattle	W 102–86	Alvan Adams (26)	Arizona Veterans Memorial Coliseum; 10,253	3–0	W 3
4	October 19	@ Milwaukee	L 94–95	Paul Westphal (29)	MECCA Arena; 10,938	3–1	L 1
5	October 20	@ Chicago	L 104–116	Alvan Adams (32)	Chicago Stadium; 12,117	3–2	L 2
6	October 21	@ Kansas City	L 85–122	Truck Robinson (21)	Kemper Arena; 6,648	3–3	L 3
7	October 23	Milwaukee	L 108–114	Truck Robinson (34)	Arizona Veterans Memorial Coliseum; 10,538	3–4	L 4
8	October 24	@ Golden State	W 110–108 (OT)	Paul Westphal (37)	Oakland–Alameda County Coliseum Arena; 6,296	4–4	W 1
9	October 26	@ Seattle	W 92–86	Walter Davis (22)	Kingdome; 18,514	5–4	W 2
10	October 28	@ Portland	W 89–88	Paul Westphal (25)	Memorial Coliseum; 12,66	6–4	W 3
11	October 30	San Antonio	W 142–109	Truck Robinson (23)	Arizona Veterans Memorial Coliseum; 11,489	7–4	W 4

November: 9–5 (home: 6–2; road: 3–3)

Game	Date	Team	Score	High points	Location Attendance	Record	Streak
12	November 2	@ Los Angeles	L 110–112	Alvan Adams (29)	The Forum; 14,344	7–5	L 1
13	November 6	@ Utah	W 120–107	Paul Westphal (31)	Salt Palace; 6,197	8–5	W 1
14	November 7	San Diego	L 102–114	Alvan Adams (23)	Arizona Veterans Memorial Coliseum; 11,097	8–6	L 1
15	November 9	Cleveland	W 110–106	Truck Robinson (25)	Arizona Veterans Memorial Coliseum; 10,911	9–6	W 1
16	November 11	Denver	W 116–91	Truck Robinson (26)	Arizona Veterans Memorial Coliseum; 11,118	10–6	W 2
17	November 14	Indiana	W 104–100	Walter Davis (30)	Arizona Veterans Memorial Coliseum; 9,762	11–6	W 3
18	November 16	Portland	W 98–97	Walter Davis (32)	Arizona Veterans Memorial Coliseum; 11,464	12–6	W 4
19	November 18	Golden State	L 95–99	Walter Davis	Arizona Veterans Memorial Coliseum; 10,409	12–7	L 1
20	November 20	@ San Diego	L 110–117	Walter Davis (23)	San Diego Sports Arena; 6,992	12–8	L 2
21	November 21	Kansas City	W 128–120	Walter Davis (28)	Arizona Veterans Memorial Coliseum; 10,704	13–8	W 1
22	November 23	Los Angeles	W 126–112	Paul Westphal (25)	Arizona Veterans Memorial Coliseum; 12,660	14–8	W 2
23	November 24	@ Denver	W 115–101	Walter Davis (40)	McNichols Sports Arena; 13,664	15–8	W 3
24	November 25	@ Portland	W 87–86	Walter Davis (22)	Memorial Coliseum; 12,666	16–8	W 4
25	November 28	@ Seattle	L 116–127	Paul Westphal (30)	Kingdome; 28,248	16–9	L 1

December: 10–5 (home: 6–0; road: 4–5)

Game	Date	Team	Score	High points	Location Attendance	Record	Streak
26	December 1	Chicago	W 99–86	Truck Robinson, Paul Westphal (17)	Arizona Veterans Memorial Coliseum; 12,660	17–9	W 1
27	December 4	@ New York	L 114–118	Paul Westphal (35)	Madison Square Garden; 11,042	17–10	L 1
28	December 5	@ New Jersey	L 100–115	Walter Davis (28)	Rutgers Athletic Center; 5,162	17–11	L 2
29	December 7	@ Boston	L 92–100	Walter Davis (27)	Boston Garden; 15,320	17–12	L 3
30	December 8	@ Philadelphia	L 96–117	Truck Robinson (19)	The Spectrum; 12,051	17–13	L 4
31	December 11	@ Washington	W 123–99	Paul Westphal (27)	Capital Centre; 8,216	18–13	W 1
32	December 13	Houston	W 121–113	Walter Davis (31)	Arizona Veterans Memorial Coliseum; 11,841	19–13	W 2
33	December 15	Detroit	W 126–105	Walter Davis (32)	Arizona Veterans Memorial Coliseum; 11,844	20–13	W 3
34	December 19	Utah	W 117–99	Paul Westphal (20)	Arizona Veterans Memorial Coliseum; 10,501	21–13	W 4
35	December 21	@ Chicago	W 127–117	Truck Robinson (27)	Chicago Stadium; 5,706	22–13	W 5
36	December 22	@ Kansas City	W 115–111	Paul Westphal (30)	Kemper Arena; 8,868	23–13	W 6
37	December 23	@ Milwaukee	W 106–103	Paul Westphal (26)	MECCA Arena; 10,938	24–13	W 7
38	December 26	Portland	W 119–99	Truck Robinson (21)	Arizona Veterans Memorial Coliseum; 12,660	25–13	W 8
39	December 28	Kansas City	W 118–112	Paul Westphal (31)	Arizona Veterans Memorial Coliseum; 12,660	26–13	W 9
40	December 30	@ Los Angeles	L 105–113	Paul Westphal (29)	The Forum; 15,544	26–14	L 1

January: 9–5 (home: 7–1; road: 2–4)

Game	Date	Team	Score	High points	Location Attendance	Record	Streak
41	January 2	@ San Antonio	L 109–118	Truck Robinson (29)	HemisFair Arena; 8,276	26–15	L 2
42	January 5	@ Houston	L 110–111	Paul Westphal (26)	The Summit; 9,122	26–16	L 3
43	January 9	Golden State	W 113–100	Walter Davis (19)	Arizona Veterans Memorial Coliseum; 11,706	27–16	W 1
44	January 12	@ Golden State	L 96–107	Walter Davis (19)	Oakland–Alameda County Coliseum Arena; 9,547	27–17	L 1
45	January 13	Utah	W 106–103	Paul Westphal (28)	Arizona Veterans Memorial Coliseum; 10,725	28–17	W 1
46	January 15	@ Denver	W 107–99	Paul Westphal (19)	McNichols Sports Arena; 13,057	29–17	W 2
47	January 16	@ Utah	W 115–108	Truck Robinson (27)	Salt Palace; 6,588	30–17	W 3
48	January 17	Atlanta	W 101–99	Paul Westphal (29)	Arizona Veterans Memorial Coliseum; 12,660	31–17	W 4
49	January 19	San Diego	W 137–123	Paul Westphal (30)	Arizona Veterans Memorial Coliseum; 12,660	32–17	W 5
50	January 23	New York	L 109–119	Paul Westphal (27)	Arizona Veterans Memorial Coliseum; 11,504	32–18	L 1
51	January 25	Milwaukee	W 110–96	Truck Robinson (23)	Arizona Veterans Memorial Coliseum; 12,660	33–18	W 1
52	January 27	Philadelphia	W 125–118	Paul Westphal (26)	Arizona Veterans Memorial Coliseum; 12,660	34–18	W 2
53	January 29	@ San Diego	L 121–133	Truck Robinson (31)	San Diego Sports Arena; 11,428	34–19	L 1
54	January 30	Denver	W 122–114	Paul Westphal (30)	Arizona Veterans Memorial Coliseum; 11,069	35–19	W 1

February: 8–5 (home: 4–1; road: 4–4)

Game	Date	Team	Score	High points	Location Attendance	Record	Streak
55	February 6	Kansas City	W 97–95	Walter Davis (21)	Arizona Veterans Memorial Coliseum; 12,310	36–19	W 2
56	February 8	@ Chicago	W 113–109	Mike Bratz (20)	Chicago Stadium; 10,403	37–19	W 3
57	February 10	@ Milwaukee	L 107–109	Walter Davis (27)	MECCA Arena; 10,938	37–20	L 1
58	February 13	Boston	W 135–134	Paul Westphal (34)	Arizona Veterans Memorial Coliseum; 12,660	38–20	W 1
59	February 15	Washington	W 116–104	Truck Robinson (26)	Arizona Veterans Memorial Coliseum; 12,660	39–20	W 2
60	February 17	New Jersey	W 128–98	Paul Westphal (24)	Arizona Veterans Memorial Coliseum; 12,466	40–20	W 3
61	February 19	@ Cleveland	L 109–128	Walter Davis (32)	Coliseum at Richfield; 5,739	40–21	L 1
62	February 21	@ Detroit	W 125–116	Paul Westphal (49)	Pontiac Silverdome; 5,317	41–21	W 1
63	February 22	@ Atlanta	L 104–111	Alvan Adams (19)	Omni Coliseum; 13,150	41–22	L 1
64	February 24	@ Indiana	W 113–105	Walter Davis (29)	Market Square Arena; 9,174	42–22	W 1
65	February 26	@ Denver	L 112–121	Truck Robinson (25)	McNichols Sports Arena; 11,149	42–23	L 1
66	February 27	Milwaukee	L 110–119 (OT)	Walter Davis (24)	Arizona Veterans Memorial Coliseum; 11,683	42–24	L 2
67	February 28	@ Utah	W 111–101	Paul Westphal (30)	Salt Palace; 6,903	43–24	W 1

March: 12–3 (home: 9–0; road: 3–3)

Game	Date	Team	Score	High points	Location Attendance	Record	Streak
68	March 2	Los Angeles	W 125–115	Paul Westphal (25)	Arizona Veterans Memorial Coliseum; 12,660	44–24	W 2
69	March 5	Seattle	W 127–111	Walter Davis (30)	Arizona Veterans Memorial Coliseum; 12,660	45–24	W 3
70	March 7	Utah	W 110–94	Walter Davis, Paul Westphal (24)	Arizona Veterans Memorial Coliseum; 12,245	46–24	W 4
71	March 9	Chicago	W 113–103 (OT)	Paul Westphal (32)	Arizona Veterans Memorial Coliseum; 11,210	47–24	W 5
72	March 12	@ Golden State	W 122–113	Paul Westphal (31)	Oakland–Alameda County Coliseum Arena; 6,936	48–24	W 6
73	March 15	@ San Diego	L 109–120	Truck Robinson (29)	San Diego Sports Arena; 10,635	48–25	L 1
74	March 16	@ Los Angeles	L 106–128	Truck Robinson (26)	The Forum; 16,587	48–26	L 2
75	March 18	@ Kansas City	W 112–109	Walter Davis (25)	Kemper Arena; 11,448	49–26	W 1
76	March 19	Los Angeles	W 112–108	Paul Westphal (30)	Arizona Veterans Memorial Coliseum; 12,660	50–26	W 2
77	March 21	@ Portland	W 111–100	Truck Robinson (23)	Memorial Coliseum; 12,666	51–26	W 3
78	March 23	Denver	W 118–102	Walter Davis (27)	Arizona Veterans Memorial Coliseum; 11,705	52–26	W 4
79	March 25	@ Seattle	L 95–104	Walter Davis (21)	Kingdome; 34,152	52–27	L 1
80	March 26	Seattle	W 109–99	Walter Davis (32)	Arizona Veterans Memorial Coliseum; 12,660	53–27	W 1
81	March 28	Portland	W 114–100	Walter Davis (20)	Arizona Veterans Memorial Coliseum; 12,224	54–27	W 2
82	March 30	San Diego	W 122–104	Walter Davis (23)	Arizona Veterans Memorial Coliseum; 10,807	55–27	W 3

1979 schedule

== Playoffs ==
=== Game log ===
1980 playoff game log
First Round: 2–1 (home: 2–0; road: 0–1)

Game	Date	Team	Score	High points	High rebounds	High assists	Location Attendance	Series
1	April 2	Kansas City	W 96–93	Paul Westphal (23)	Truck Robinson (14)	Walter Davis (7)	Arizona Veterans Memorial Coliseum; 12,660	1–0
2	April 4	@ Kansas City	L 96–106	Alvan Adams (22)	Alvan Adams (12)	Alvan Adams (7)	Kemper Arena; 9,637	1–1
3	April 6	Kansas City	W 114–99	Walter Davis (22)	Alvan Adams (20)	Adams, Davis (7)	Arizona Veterans Memorial Coliseum; 11,306	2–1

Conference semifinals: 1–4 (home: 1–1; road: 0–3)

Game	Date	Team	Score	High points	High rebounds	High assists	Location Attendance	Series
1	April 8	@ Los Angeles	L 110–119	Mike Bratz (25)	Rich Kelley (10)	Don Buse (9)	The Forum; 15,892	0–1
2	April 9	@ Los Angeles	L 128–131 (OT)	Paul Westphal (37)	Gar Heard (9)	Alvan Adams (12)	The Forum; 14,286	0–2
3	April 11	Los Angeles	L 105–108	Walter Davis (28)	Gar Heard (11)	Davis, Buse (5)	Arizona Veterans Memorial Coliseum; 12,660	0–3
4	April 13	Los Angeles	W 127–101	Paul Westphal (25)	Gar Heard (9)	Buse, Adams (6)	Arizona Veterans Memorial Coliseum; 12,660	1–3
5	April 15	@ Los Angeles	L 101–126	Walter Davis (24)	Adams, Cook (6)	Rich Kelley (7)	The Forum; 17,505	1–4

1980 schedule

== Awards and honors ==
=== All-Star ===
- Paul Westphal was selected as a reserve for the Western Conference in the All-Star Game. It was his fourth consecutive All-Star selection. Westphal finished fourth in voting among Western Conference guards with 127,409 votes.
- Walter Davis was selected as a reserve for the Western Conference in the All-Star Game. It was his third consecutive All-Star selection. Davis finished fourth in voting among Western Conference forwards with 100,546 votes.

=== Season ===
- Paul Westphal was named to the All-NBA First Team.
- Don Buse was named to the NBA All-Defensive First Team.

== Player statistics ==
Legend
GP	Games played	GS	Games started	MPG	Minutes per game
FG%	Field-goal percentage	3P%	3-point field-goal percentage	FT%	Free-throw percentage
RPG	Rebounds per game	APG	Assists per game	SPG	Steals per game
BPG	Blocks per game	PPG	Points per game

=== Season ===
Phoenix Suns statistics
Player	GP	GS	MPG	FG%	3P%	FT%	RPG	APG	SPG	BPG	PPG
Alvan Adams	75	63	28.9	.531	.000	.797	8.1	4.3	1.4	.7+	14.9
Mike Bratz	82	1	19.4	.392	.244	.870	2.0	2.7	1.1	.1	8.5
Don Buse	81	81	30.9	.443	.241	.664	2.9	4.0	1.6	.1	7.7
Jeff Cook	66	14	13.7	.469	.000	.806	3.7	1.3	.4	.3	5.5
Walter Davis	75	73	30.8	.563	.000	.819	3.6	4.5	1.5	.3	21.5
Garfield Heard	82	5	17.1	.417	.000	.744	4.6	1.2	1.0	.6	5.0
Johnny High	82	0	13.7	.446	.143	.674	2.1	1.5	.9	.2	5.0
Rich Kelley*	23	0	16.2	.506	.	.783	5.1	2.2	1.2	.7+	5.8
Joel Kramer	54	6	13.2	.469	.000	.800	2.8	1.4	.5	.1	3.5
Truck Robinson	82	82	33.0	.512	.	.667	9.4	1.7	.7	.7	17.3
Alvin Scott	79	3	16.5	.422	.333†	.779	2.9	1.2	.6	.7	4.4
Paul Westphal	82	82	32.5	.525	.280†	.862	2.3	5.1	1.5	.4	21.9

* – Stats with the Suns.
† – Minimum 25 three-pointers made.
+ – Minimum 50 games played.

=== Playoffs ===
Phoenix Suns statistics
Player	GP	GS	MPG	FG%	3P%	FT%	RPG	APG	SPG	BPG	PPG
Alvan Adams	8	8	31.4	.566†	.	.895^	9.6	5.8	.9	1.3	16.1
Mike Bratz	8	0	21.1	.512	.391	.900^	2.5	2.0	1.1	.0	13.0
Don Buse	8	8	29.5	.438	.385	.636	2.6	5.5	.8	.0	8.5
Jeff Cook	7	0	14.0	.667†	.	.846	3.0	1.0	.6	.3	7.7
Walter Davis	8	8	30.6	.504	.000	.737	2.9	4.4	.5	.1	20.8
Garfield Heard	8	6	27.9	.393	.	.733	6.4	1.5	1.1	1.4	6.9
Johnny High	8	0	15.0	.387	.000	.500	3.1	2.5	.8	.3	4.0
Rich Kelley	8	0	18.3	.432	.000	.900^	4.5	2.8	1.1	.9	5.9
Truck Robinson	3	2	21.3	.375	.	.714	6.7	1.3	1.0	.7	5.7
Alvin Scott	8	0	17.5	.515	.000	.500	2.8	1.3	.5	.6	4.8
Paul Westphal	8	8	31.6	.486	.083	.875	1.3	3.9	1.4	.4	20.9

† – Minimum 20 field goals made.
^ – Minimum 10 free throws made.

== Transactions ==
=== Trades ===
June 22, 1979	To Washington Bullets Rights to (United States) Steve Malovic	To Phoenix Suns 1979 first-round draft pick ( (United States) Kyle Macy) 1980 third-round draft pick ( (United States) John Campbell)
August 20, 1979	To Detroit Pistons 1981 fourth-round draft pick ( (United States) Don Koonce)	To Phoenix Suns (United States) Andre Wakefield
February 15, 1980	To New Jersey Nets 1982 first-round draft pick ( (United States) Brook Steppe) 1983 second-round draft pick ( (United States) Pace Mannion) Cash considerations	To Phoenix Suns (United States) Rich Kelley

=== Free agents ===
==== Additions ====
Date	Player	Contract	Old Team
May 22, 1979	Jeff Cook	Undisclosed	Washington Lumberjacks (WBA)
September 13, 1979	Greg Griffin	Undisclosed	Phoenix Suns

==== Subtractions ====
Date	Player	Reason left	New team
September 4, 1979	Ted McClain	Waived	
October 1, 1979	Al Green	Waived	
October 1, 1979	Charles Jones	Waived	Maine Lumberjacks (CBA)
October 1, 1979	Greg Griffin	Waived	
October 12, 1979	Andre Wakefield	Waived	Utah Jazz
