= 1979–80 Utah Jazz season =

NBA professional basketball team season

- Head coach: Tom Nissalke
- General manager: Frank Layden
- Owners: Sam Battistone; Larry Hatfield
- Arena: Salt Palace

Results
- Record: 24–58 (.293)
- Place: Division: 5th (Midwest); Conference: 11th (Western)
- Playoff finish: Did not qualify
- Stats at Basketball Reference

Local media
- Television: KSL-TV
- Radio: KSL

The 1979–80 season was the Jazz sixth season in the NBA and its first in Utah. The Jazz averaged 102.4 points per game (ranked 22 in NBA) while allowing an average of 108.4 points per game (ranked 10th in NBA). The attendance was 320,649 (ranked 21st in NBA). The attendance figure was worse than the last season in New Orleans, where the club had an attendance of 364,205 (ranked 18th in NBA). In addition, the Jazz move from the Central Division to the Midwest Division (with the Indiana Pacers replacing them).

== Draft picks ==
Round	Pick	Player	Position	Nationality	School/Club team
1	20	Larry Knight		United States	Loyola University of Chicago
2	23	Tico Brown			Georgia Institute of Technology

== Roster ==
1979–80 Utah Jazz roster
Players

Pos.	No.	Player	Height	Weight	DOB	From
SG	24	Ron Boone	6 ft 2 in (1.88 m)	200 lb (91 kg)	1946–09–06	Idaho State
PF	33	Tom Boswell	6 ft 9 in (2.06 m)	220 lb (100 kg)	1953–10–02	South Carolina
SF	44	Allan Bristow	6 ft 7 in (2.01 m)	210 lb (95 kg)	1951–08–23	Virginia Tech
PG	33	Mack Calvin	6 ft 0 in (1.83 m)	165 lb (75 kg)	1947–07–27	USC
SF	4	Adrian Dantley	6 ft 5 in (1.96 m)	208 lb (94 kg)	1955–02–28	Notre Dame
PG	12	Brad Davis	6 ft 3 in (1.91 m)	180 lb (82 kg)	1955–12–17	Maryland
SF	31	Paul Dawkins	6 ft 5 in (1.96 m)	190 lb (86 kg)	1957–06–10	Northern Illinois
SG	25	Terry Furlow	6 ft 4 in (1.93 m)	190 lb (86 kg)	1954–10–10	Michigan State
PF	11	James Hardy	6 ft 8 in (2.03 m)	220 lb (100 kg)	1956–12–01	San Francisco
C	51	Carl Kilpatrick	6 ft 10 in (2.08 m)	230 lb (104 kg)	1956–05–16	Louisiana–Monroe
SF	22	Bernard King (injured)	6 ft 7 in (2.01 m)	205 lb (93 kg)	1956–12–04	Tennessee
C	50	Ben Poquette	6 ft 9 in (2.06 m)	235 lb (107 kg)	1955–05–07	Central Michigan
C	40	Jerome Whitehead	6 ft 10 in (2.08 m)	220 lb (100 kg)	1956–09–30	Marquette
PG	20	Duck Williams	6 ft 2 in (1.88 m)	180 lb (82 kg)	1956–08–02	Notre Dame

Coaches
Head coach
- Tom Nissalke
Assistant(s)
- Bill Bertka
- Gene Littles

Legend
- (DP) Unsigned draft pick
- (FA) Free agent
- (S) Suspended
- Injured

Roster
Updated: March 10, 1980

== Regular season ==
Pete Maravich was waived by the Jazz on January 18, 1980, and was quickly picked up by the Boston Celtics where he played the rest of the season alongside Larry Bird.

=== Season standings ===
Midwest Division	W	L	PCT	GB	Home	Road	Div
y-Milwaukee Bucks	49	33	.598	–	28–12	21–21	15–9
x-Kansas City Kings	47	35	.573	2	30–11	17–24	18–6
Chicago Bulls	30	52	.366	19	21–20	9–32	8–16
Denver Nuggets	30	52	.366	19	24–17	6–35	10–14
Utah Jazz	24	58	.293	25	17–24	7–34	9–15

#	Western Conference				
#	Team	W	L	PCT	GB
1	c-Los Angeles Lakers	60	22	.732	–
2	y-Milwaukee Bucks	49	33	.598	11
3	x-Seattle SuperSonics	56	26	.683	4
4	x-Phoenix Suns	55	27	.671	5
5	x-Kansas City Kings	47	35	.573	13
6	x-Portland Trail Blazers	38	44	.463	22
7	San Diego Clippers	35	47	.427	25
8	Chicago Bulls	30	52	.366	30
9	Denver Nuggets	30	52	.366	30
10	Utah Jazz	24	58	.293	36
11	Golden State Warriors	24	58	.293	36

== Game log ==
=== Regular season ===
1979–80 game log
Total: (Home: 17–24; Road: 7–34)
October: 2–7 (home: 2–2; road: 0–5)

Game	Date	Team	Score	High points	High rebounds	High assists	Location Attendance	Record
1	October 12	@ Portland	L 85–101				Memorial Coliseum	0–1
2	October 15	Milwaukee	L 107–131				Salt Palace	0–2
3	October 18	Portland	L 92–107				Salt Palace	0–3
4	October 20	@ Golden State	96–101				Oracle Arena	0–4
5	October 22	San Diego	110–109				Salt Palace	1–4
6	October 23	@ Los Angeles	L 87–102				The Forum	1–5
7	October 25	Chicago	113–105				Salt Palace	2–5
8	October 27	@ Denver	96–116				McNichols Sports Arena	2–6
9	October 31	@ Kansas City	L 108–125				Municipal Auditorium	2–7

November: 1–12 (home: 0–6; road: 1–6)

Game	Date	Team	Score	High points	High rebounds	High assists	Location Attendance	Record
10	November 1	New York	L 118–134				Salt Palace	2–8
12	November 6	Phoenix	L 107–120				Salt Palace	2–10
14	November 10	Seattle	L 87–88				Salt Palace	2–12
16	November 14	@ Atlanta	L 97–108				The Omni	2–14
17	November 16	@ Boston	L 97–113				Boston Garden	2–15
18	November 17	@ Washington	L 103–111				Capital Centre	2–16
21	November 27	Los Angeles	L 118–122				Salt Palace	2–19

December: 9–8 (home: 6–3; road: 3–5)

Game	Date	Team	Score	High points	High rebounds	High assists	Location Attendance	Record
23	December 1	Seattle	W 97–95				Salt Palace	4–19
24	December 3	Milwaukee	L 89–96				Salt Palace	4–20
25	December 5	@ Seattle	L 96–115				Kingdome	4–21
26	December 6	Portland	W 87–82 (OT)				Salt Palace	5–21
29	December 13	San Antonio	W 144–114				Salt Palace	8–21
30	December 14	@ Kansas City	L 87–103				Municipal Auditorium	8–22
31	December 16	@ Milwaukee	L 79–104				MECCA Arena	8–23
33	December 19	@ Phoenix	L 99–117				Arizona Veterans Memorial Coliseum	9–24
37	December 27	Los Angeles	L 116–124				Salt Palace	10–27
39	December 30	@ Milwaukee	W 95–88				MECCA Arena	12–27

January: 6–10 (home: 5–4; road: 1–6)

Game	Date	Team	Score	High points	High rebounds	High assists	Location Attendance	Record
40	January 2	Kansas City	L 121–128 (OT)				Salt Palace	12–28
41	January 4	@ Portland	L 97–115				Memorial Coliseum	12–29
42	January 5	Washington	L 107–108				Salt Palace	12–30
44	January 11	@ Seattle	L 90–100				Kingdome	13–31
46	January 13	@ Phoenix	L 103–106				Arizona Veterans Memorial Coliseum	13–33
47	January 15	@ Los Angeles	L 99–112				The Forum	13–34
48	January 16	Phoenix	L 108–115				Salt Palace	13–35
51	January 22	Milwaukee	W 127–122 (OT)				Salt Palace	16–35
52	January 24	Kansas City	L 88–110				Salt Palace	16–36
53	January 26	@ Kansas City	L 107–112				Municipal Auditorium	16–37
54	January 28	Philadelphia	W 107–101				Salt Palace	17–37

February: 3–10 (home: 1–5; road: 2–5)

Game	Date	Team	Score	High points	High rebounds	High assists	Location Attendance	Record
All-Star Break
57	February 7	Atlanta	L 90–92				Salt Palace	19–38
58	February 9	@ Houston	L 95–117				The Summit	19–39
59	February 10	@ San Antonio	L 128–148				HemisFair Arena	19–40
60	February 13	@ Philadelphia	L 85–107				The Spectrum	19–41
62	February 16	@ New York	W 121–102				Madison Square Garden	20–42
63	February 20	Boston	L 98–105				Salt Palace	20–43
64	February 22	Houston	L 82–94				Salt Palace	20–44
65	February 23	Seattle	L 95–105				Salt Palace	20–45
67	February 28	Phoenix	L 101–111				Salt Palace	20–47
68	February 29	@ Portland	W 91–87				Memorial Coliseum	21–47

March: 3–11 (home: 3–4; road: 0–7)

Game	Date	Team	Score	High points	High rebounds	High assists	Location Attendance	Record
69	March 2	@ Seattle	L 91–103				Kingdome	21–48
71	March 6	Portland	W 117–110				Salt Palace	22–49
72	March 7	@ Phoenix	L 94–110				Arizona Veterans Memorial Coliseum	22–50
77	March 21	Kansas City	L 98–102				Salt Palace	23–54
78	March 23	@ Los Angeles	L 96–101				The Forum	23–55
80	March 27	Los Angeles	L 95–97				Salt Palace	24–56
82	March 30	@ Milwaukee	L 91–107				MECCA Arena	24–58

1979–80 schedule

== Player statistics ==
Legend
GP	Games played	GS	Games started	MPG	Minutes per game
FG%	Field-goal percentage	3P%	3-point field-goal percentage	FT%	Free-throw percentage
RPG	Rebounds per game	APG	Assists per game	SPG	Steals per game
BPG	Blocks per game	PPG	Points per game

Player	GP	GS	MPG	FG%	3FG%	FT%	RPG	APG	SPG	BPG	PPG
Ron Boone											
Tom Boswell											
Allan Bristow											
John Brown											
Mack Calvin											
Brad Davis											
Adrian Dantley											
Paul Dawkins											
Greg Deane											
Terry Furlow											
John Gianelli											
James Hardy											
Carl Kilpatrick											
Bernard King											
Pete Maravich											
Ben Poquette											
Robert Smith											
Andre Wakefield											
Jerome Whitehead											
Duck Williams											

== Transactions ==
Added Bernard King to Roster.
