= 1979–80 Denver Nuggets season =

NBA professional basketball team season

- Head coach: Donnie Walsh
- Arena: McNichols Sports Arena

Results
- Record: 30–52 (.366)
- Place: Division: 4th (Midwest); Conference: 9th (Western)
- Playoff finish: Did not qualify
- Stats at Basketball Reference

Local media
- Television: KWGN-TV
- Radio: KOA

The 1979–80 Denver Nuggets season was the Nuggets' 4th season in the NBA and 13th season as a franchise.

== Draft picks ==
Round	Pick	Player	Position	Nationality	School/Club team
2	30	Gary Garland	G	United States	DePaul
5	102	Larry Williams		United States	Louisville
6	122	Odell Bell		United States	Marquette
7	144	John Johnson		United States	Creighton
8	162	Matt Teahan		United States	Denver
9	179	Emmett Lewis		United States	Colorado

== Roster ==
1979–80 Denver Nuggets roster
Players

Pos.	No.	Player	Height	Weight	DOB	From
F	31	Bo Ellis	6 ft 9 in (2.06 m)	197 lb (89 kg)		Marquette
SF	2	Alex English	6 ft 7 in (2.01 m)	190 lb (86 kg)		South Carolina
G	24	Gary Garland	6 ft 4 in (1.93 m)	180 lb (82 kg)		DePaul
F	22	Glen Gondrezick	6 ft 6 in (1.98 m)	218 lb (99 kg)		UNLV
C	35	Kim Hughes	6 ft 11 in (2.11 m)	220 lb (100 kg)		Wisconsin
C	44	Dan Issel	6 ft 9 in (2.06 m)	235 lb (107 kg)		Kentucky
F	20	George L. Johnson	6 ft 7 in (2.01 m)	210 lb (95 kg)		St. John's
C	41	Arvid Kramer	6 ft 9 in (2.06 m)	220 lb (100 kg)		Augustana (SD)
G	10	John Roche	6 ft 3 in (1.91 m)	170 lb (77 kg)		South Carolina
G	11	Charlie Scott	6 ft 5 in (1.96 m)	175 lb (79 kg)		North Carolina
SF	33	David Thompson (injured)	6 ft 4 in (1.93 m)	195 lb (88 kg)		NC State
G	32	Bob Wilkerson	6 ft 6 in (1.98 m)	195 lb (88 kg)		Indiana

Coaches
Head coach
- Donnie Walsh
Assistant(s)
- George Irvine

Legend
- (DP) Unsigned draft pick
- (FA) Free agent
- (S) Suspended
- Injured

== Regular season ==
=== Season standings ===
Midwest Division	W	L	PCT	GB	Home	Road	Div
y-Milwaukee Bucks	49	33	.598	–	28–12	21–21	15–9
x-Kansas City Kings	47	35	.573	2	30–11	17–24	18–6
Chicago Bulls	30	52	.366	19	21–20	9–32	8–16
Denver Nuggets	30	52	.366	19	24–17	6–35	10–14
Utah Jazz	24	58	.293	25	17–24	7–34	9–15

#	Western Conference				
#	Team	W	L	PCT	GB
1	c-Los Angeles Lakers	60	22	.732	–
2	y-Milwaukee Bucks	49	33	.598	11
3	x-Seattle SuperSonics	56	26	.683	4
4	x-Phoenix Suns	55	27	.671	5
5	x-Kansas City Kings	47	35	.573	13
6	x-Portland Trail Blazers	38	44	.463	22
7	San Diego Clippers	35	47	.427	25
8	Chicago Bulls	30	52	.366	30
9	Denver Nuggets	30	52	.366	30
10	Utah Jazz	24	58	.293	36
11	Golden State Warriors	24	58	.293	36

z - clinched division title
y - clinched division title
x - clinched playoff spot

== Game log ==
=== Regular season ===
1979–80 game log
Total: 30–52 (home: 24–17; road: 6–35)
October: 2–8 (home: 2–4; road: 0–4)

Game	Date	Team	Score	High points	High rebounds	High assists	Location Attendance	Record

November: 7–9 (home: 4–3; road: 3–6)

Game	Date	Team	Score	High points	High rebounds	High assists	Location Attendance	Record

December: 5–9 (home: 5–1; road: 0–8)

Game	Date	Team	Score	High points	High rebounds	High assists	Location Attendance	Record

January: 5–11 (home: 4–4; road: 1–7)

Game	Date	Team	Score	High points	High rebounds	High assists	Location Attendance	Record

February: 6–5 (home: 5–3; road: 1–2)

Game	Date	Team	Score	High points	High rebounds	High assists	Location Attendance	Record
All-Star Break
61	February 15	Atlanta	W 111–98				McNichols Sports Arena	22–39

March: 5–10 (home: 4–2; road: 1–8)

Game	Date	Team	Score	High points	High rebounds	High assists	Location Attendance	Record
68	March 2	@ Atlanta	L 93–100				The Omni	25–43

1979–80 schedule

== See also ==
- 1979-80 NBA season
