= 1980 NBA All-Star Game =

Exhibition basketball game

	1	2	3	4	OT	Total
West	37	27	27	37	8	136
East	28	36	44	20	16	144
- Date: February 3, 1980
- Arena: Capital Centre
- City: Landover
- MVP: George Gervin
- Attendance: 19,035
- Network: CBS
- Announcers: Brent Musburger (Play by Play); Bill Russell and Rod Hundley (Color); Gary Bender (Sideline)

NBA All-Star Game
< 1979	1981 >

The 1980 NBA All-Star Game was an exhibition basketball game which was played on February 3, 1980, at the Capital Centre in Landover, Maryland, home of the Washington Bullets. This was the second NBA All-Star Game hosted by the Bullets (now Washington Wizards) franchise, following the 1969 game in Baltimore. It was the only All-Star Game held in Landover to date, as the team moved to the Washington, D.C. proper in 1997.

The Eastern All-Stars defeated the Western All-Stars in overtime, 144–136. The MVP of the game was George Gervin, who scored 34 points for the Eastern All-Stars.

== Coaches ==
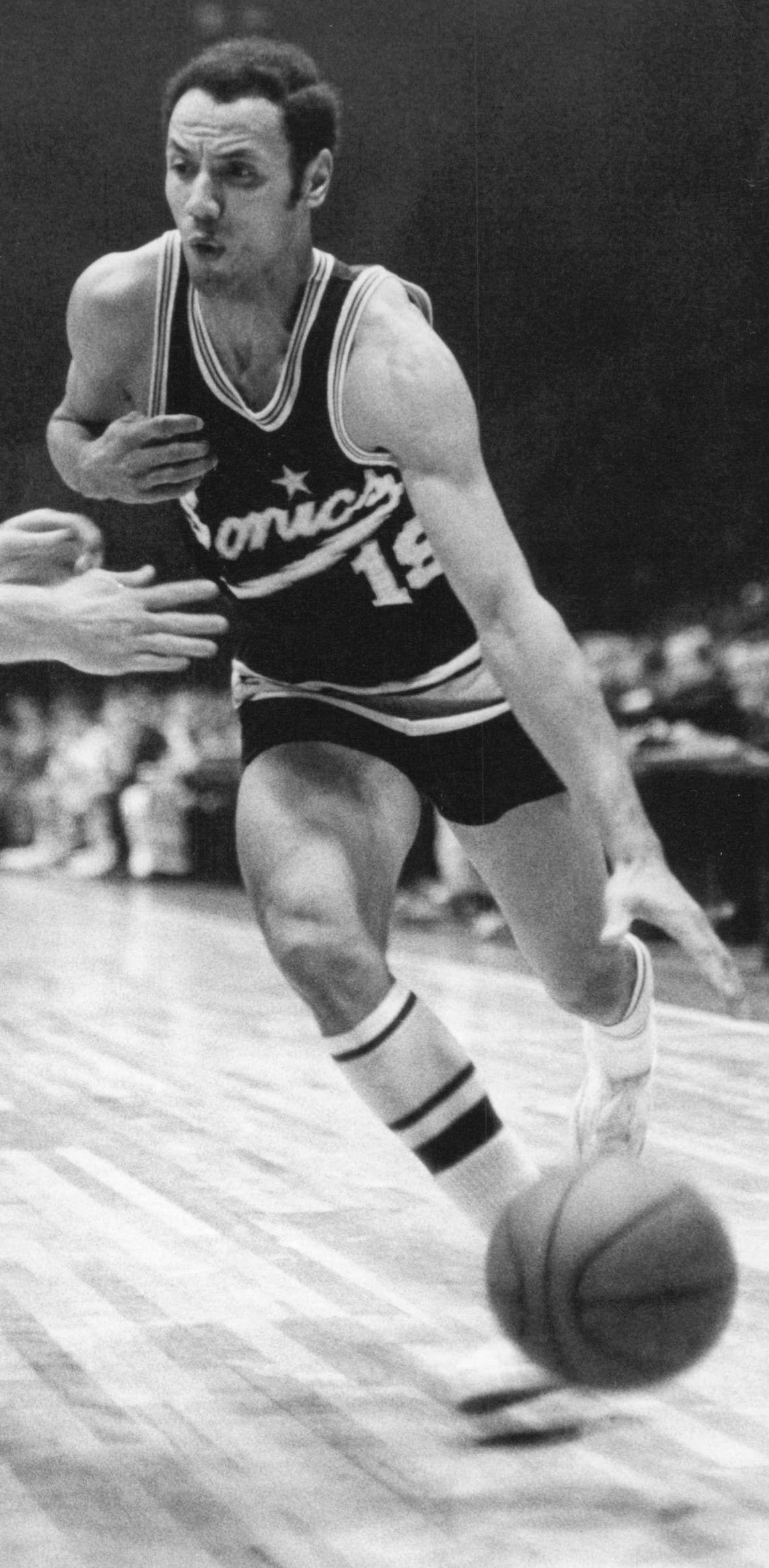
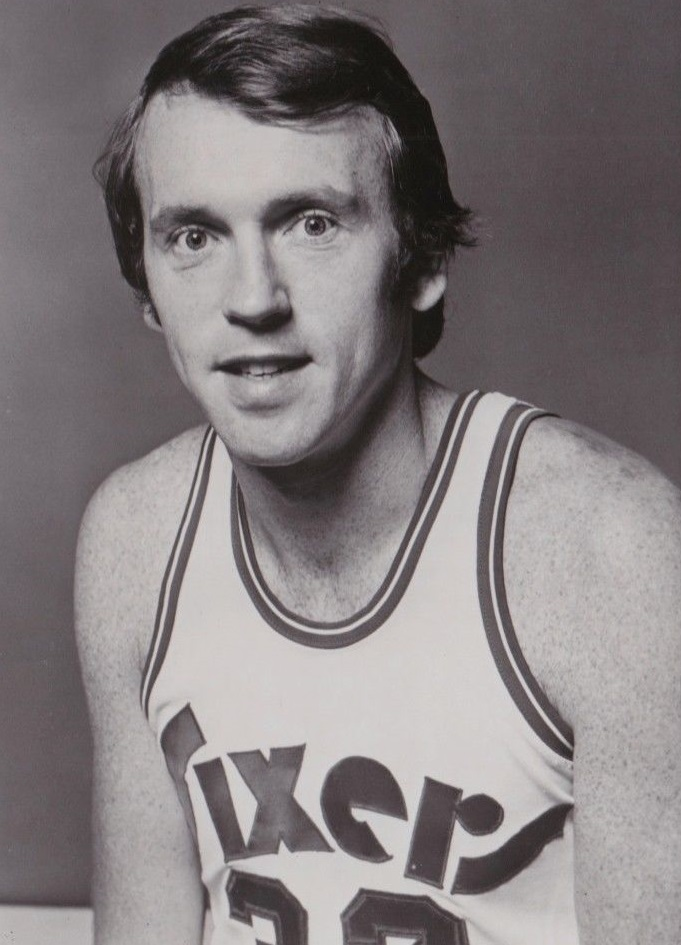
Lenny Wilkens and Billy Cunningham were selected as the West and East head coach, respectively.

Billy Cunningham, head coach of Philadelphia 76ers, qualified as the head coach of the Eastern All-Stars. Lenny Wilkens, head coach of the Seattle SuperSonics, qualified as the head coach of the Western All-Stars. Both the 76ers and SuperSonics led their respective conferences as of the January cut-off.

== Team rosters ==
Western Conference All-Stars
Pos	Player	Team	No. of selections
Starters
G	Lloyd Free	San Diego Clippers	1
G	Magic Johnson	Los Angeles Lakers	1
C	Kareem Abdul-Jabbar	Los Angeles Lakers	10
F	Adrian Dantley	Utah Jazz	1
F	Marques Johnson	Milwaukee Bucks	2
Reserves
G	Otis Birdsong	Kansas City Kings	2
G	Walter Davis	Phoenix Suns	3
G	Dennis Johnson	Seattle SuperSonics	2
C	Jack Sikma	Seattle SuperSonics	2
F	Kermit Washington	Portland Trail Blazers	1
F	Scott Wedman	Kansas City Kings	2
F	Paul Westphal	Phoenix Suns	4
Head Coach
Lenny Wilkens, (Seattle SuperSonics)
Assistant Coach
Les Habegger (Seattle SuperSonics)
Trainer
Frank Furtado (Seattle SuperSonics)

Eastern Conference All-Stars
Pos	Player	Team	No. of selections
Starters
G	George Gervin	San Antonio Spurs	4
G	Eddie Johnson	Atlanta Hawks	1
C	Moses Malone	Houston Rockets	3
F	Julius Erving	Philadelphia 76ers	4
F	John Drew	Atlanta Hawks	2
Reserves
G	Nate Archibald	Boston Celtics	4
F	Larry Bird	Boston Celtics	1
C	Bill Cartwright	New York Knicks	1
C	Dave Cowens	Boston Celtics	8
F	Elvin Hayes	Washington Bullets	12
G	Micheal Ray Richardson	New York Knicks	1
G	Dan Roundfield	Atlanta Hawks	1
Head Coach
Billy Cunningham, (Philadelphia 76ers)
Assistant Coach
Chuck Daly, (Philadelphia 76ers); Jack McMahon (Philadelphia 76ers)
Trainer
John Lally (Washington Bullets)

Notes

Italics indicates leading vote-getters per conference.

=== Western Conference ===
Player, Team	MIN	FGM	FGA	3PM	3PA	FTM	FTA	REB	AST	BLK	PFS	PTS
Marques Johnson, MIL	34	1	6	0	0	2	2	4	1	1	2	4
Adrian Dantley, UTA	30	8	15	0	0	7	8	5	2	0	1	23
Kareem Abdul-Jabbar, LA	30	6	17	0	0	5	6	16	9	6	5	17
Jack Sikma, SEA	28	4	10	0	1	0	0	8	4	3	5	8
Paul Westphal, PHO	27	8	14	0	2	5	6	1	5	1	5	21
Magic Johnson, LA	24	5	8	0	1	2	2	2	4	2	3	12
Walter Davis, PHO	23	5	10	0	0	2	2	4	2	0	2	12
Lloyd Free, SD	21	7	13	0	0	0	1	3	5	1	1	14
Dennis Johnson, SEA	20	7	13	0	0	5	6	4	1	1	3	19
Kermit Washington, POR	14	1	6	0	0	2	4	8	1	1	4	4
Otis Birdsong, KC	14	1	2	0	0	0	0	0	0	0	1	2
Scott Wedman, KC (injured)
Totals	265	53	114	0	4	30	37	55	34	16	32	136

=== Eastern Conference ===
Player, Team	MIN	FGM	FGA	3PM	3PA	FTM	FTA	REB	AST	BLK	PFS	PTS
George Gervin, SA	40	14	26	0	0	6	9	10	3	0	2	34
Eddie Johnson, ATL	32	11	16	0	0	0	0	1	7	0	2	22
Moses Malone, HOU	31	7	12	0	0	6	12	12	2	2	4	20
Elvin Hayes, WAS	29	5	10	0	0	2	2	5	4	4	5	12
Dan Roundfield, ATL	27	7	15	0	0	4	9	13	0	2	2	18
Larry Bird, BOS	23	3	6	1	2	0	0	6	7	0	1	7
Nate Archibald, BOS	21	0	8	0	0	2	3	3	6	0	1	2
Julius Erving, PHI	20	4	12	0	0	3	4	5	2	1	5	11
John Drew, ATL	15	0	4	0	0	4	5	3	0	0	5	4
Bill Cartwright, NY	14	4	8	0	0	0	0	3	1	0	1	8
Micheal Ray Richardson, NY	13	3	7	0	0	0	0	1	2	0	2	6
Dave Cowens, BOS (injured)
Totals	265	58	124	1	2	27	44	62	34	9	30	144

== Score by periods ==
Score by periods:	1	2	3	4	OT	Final
West	37	27	27	37	8	136
East	28	36	44	20	16	144

- Officials: Joe Gushue and Ed T. Rush
- Attendance: 19,035.
