= Wiley Peck =

American basketball player

Personal information
- Born: September 15, 1957 (age 69) Montgomery, Alabama, U.S.
- Listed height: 6 ft 7 in (2.01 m)
- Listed weight: 220 lb (100 kg)

Career information
- High school: Robert E. Lee (Montgomery, Alabama)
- College: Mississippi State (1975–1979)
- NBA draft: 1979: 1st round, 19th overall pick
- Drafted by: San Antonio Spurs
- Playing career: 1979–1980
- Position: Power forward
- Number: 54

Career history
- 1979–1980: San Antonio Spurs

Career highlights
- 2× Second-team All-SEC (1978, 1979)
- Stats at NBA.com
- Stats at Basketball Reference

Wiley J. Peck (born September 15, 1957) is an American former professional basketball player. Born in Montgomery, Alabama, he was a 6'7" and 220 lb power forward and played college basketball for the Mississippi State Bulldogs. He had a brief career in the National Basketball Association (NBA) in 1979-80.

Peck was selected 19th overall by the San Antonio Spurs in the 1979 NBA draft. After one season with the Spurs, he was selected by the Dallas Mavericks in the 1980 expansion draft.

== Career statistics ==
Legend
GP	Games played	GS	Games started	MPG	Minutes per game
FG%	Field goal percentage	3P%	3-point field goal percentage	FT%	Free throw percentage
RPG	Rebounds per game	APG	Assists per game	SPG	Steals per game
BPG	Blocks per game	PPG	Points per game	**Bold**	Career high

=== NBA ===
==== Regular season ====
Year	Team	GP	MPG	FG%	3P%	FT%	RPG	APG	SPG	BPG	PPG
1979–80	San Antonio	52	12.2	.432	.000	.618	3.5	.6	.3	.4	3.5

==== Playoffs ====
Year	Team	GP	MPG	FG%	3P%	FT%	RPG	APG	SPG	BPG	PPG
1980	San Antonio	2	4.5	.000	–	–	1.5	.0	.0	.5	.0
