= John Drew (basketball) =

American basketball player (1954–2022)

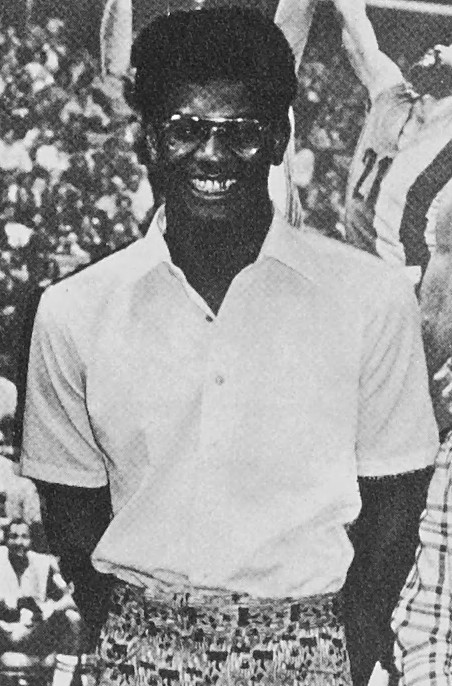
- Drew in 1974

Personal information
- Born: September 30, 1954 Vredenburgh, Alabama, U.S.
- Died: April 10, 2022 (aged 67) Houston, Texas, U.S.
- Listed height: 6 ft 6 in (1.98 m)
- Listed weight: 205 lb (93 kg)

Career information
- High school: J. F. Shields (Beatrice, Alabama)
- College: Gardner–Webb (1972–1974)
- NBA draft: 1974: 2nd round, 25th overall pick
- Drafted by: Atlanta Hawks
- Playing career: 1974–1986
- Position: Small forward
- Number: 22, 20

Career history
- 1974–1982: Atlanta Hawks
- 1982–1984: Utah Jazz
- 1985–1986: Wyoming Wildcatters

Career highlights
- 2× NBA All-Star (1976, 1980); NBA All-Rookie First Team (1975); All-CBA First Team (1986); CBA Newcomer of the Year (1986); Third-team Parade All-American (1972)

Career NBA statistics
- Points: 15,291 (20.7 ppg)
- Rebounds: 5,088 (6.9 rpg)
- Assists: 1,224 (1.7 apg)
- Stats at NBA.com
- Stats at Basketball Reference

John Edward Drew (September 30, 1954 – April 10, 2022) was an American professional basketball player. A small forward from Gardner–Webb University, he played eleven seasons in the National Basketball Association (NBA). Drew was a two-time NBA All-Star, and was the first player banned under the substance abuse policy instituted by league commissioner David Stern.

== Early life ==
Drew was born in Vredenburgh, Alabama, on September 30, 1954. He attended J.F. Shields High School in Beatrice, Alabama. He led the school to a state championship in 1972. He set the Alabama High School Athletic Association career scoring average record with 41.0 points per game.

== College career ==
After graduating from high school, Drew played basketball at Gardner–Webb University. He averaged 24.4 points during his freshman year, before improving to 25.9 points and 13 rebounds as a sophomore. He was selected in the second round of the 1974 NBA draft by the Atlanta Hawks. He would later be joined by Artis Gilmore and Eddie Lee Wilkins as the only alumni of Gardner–Webb University to play in the NBA.

== Professional career ==
=== Atlanta Hawks (1974–1982) ===
Drew made his NBA debut on October 18, 1974, scoring 32 points to go along with 12 rebounds and three assists against the Chicago Bulls. He quickly made an impact with the Hawks, averaging 18.5 points per game, 10.7 rebounds per game, and leading the NBA in offensive rebounding (357) during his rookie season. He was named to the NBA All-Rookie Team. From 1974 to 1982, Drew starred for the Hawks, with whom he was a two-time All-Star (1976 and 1980), averaging more than 20 points per game on five occasions (1976–79 and 1981). He averaged 21.6 points in his second season, when he was named an all-star for the first time. The next season in 1976–77, he averaged almost 25 point per game. In 1976 and 1977, he ranked in the top 10 in points and points per game in the NBA.

With Jason Kidd, Drew holds the NBA record for most turnovers in a regular season game (14). Drew set that mark with the Hawks in a March 1, 1978 game against New Jersey. However, he recorded 12.4 turnover percentage in the league that season, finishing eighteenth in the NBA. He then bettered that mark to 11.2 the following year, the twelfth-lowest in the league.

=== Utah Jazz (1982–1984) ===
Drew was traded along with Freeman Williams and cash to the Utah Jazz on September 2, 1982, in exchange for Dominique Wilkins. Drew went on to play three seasons (1982–1985) with the franchise. He won the Player of the Week award on March 6, 1983. He was waived in the middle of the 1984–85 season after relapsing. He finished with NBA career with 15,291 points and averages of 20.7 points, 6.9 rebounds, and 1.7 assists per game.

=== Wyoming Wildcatters (1985–1986) ===
Drew played in the Continental Basketball Association (CBA) in hopes of returning to the NBA. He spent the 1985–86 season with the Wyoming Wildcatters where he was nominated to the All-CBA First Team and chosen as the CBA Newcomer of the League.

== Drug addiction ==
Drew battled cocaine addiction during his professional basketball career. He missed 38 games during the 1982–83 season as he spent eight weeks in drug rehab. He was the runner-up that season in voting for the NBA Comeback Player of the Year Award behind Paul Westphal of the New York Knicks. He relapsed during the 1984–85 season and was waived by the Jazz, then was arrested in May 1985 for passing bad checks. The third-degree felony charge was reduced in a plea bargain to a suspended jail sentence, and Drew was ordered to enter a drug rehabilitation program. The Washington Bullets expressed interest in signing him in December, but were prohibited from doing so by the league due to his past infractions.

In January 1986, Drew became the first player to be banned by NBA commissioner David Stern for multiple violations of the league's substance abuse policy. He was not on an NBA roster at the time, but the league considered his most recent rehab stint to be his third violation under the league's drug policy. He could not seek reinstatement until the 1987–88 season. Drew opined that the policy "will keep guys from coming forward and admitting they still have a problem."

In late 1986, he was arrested in Atlanta twice in less than three months, first on October 2 for selling cocaine to an undercover agent and then on December 17 for cocaine possession and purchasing the drug from an undercover agent.

== Later life ==
After several years out of the public eye, Drew resurfaced in 2002, when he told the Atlanta Journal-Constitution that he had a grip on his addiction, without going into further details. He worked as a taxi driver in Houston during his later years.

Drew died on April 10, 2022, in Houston. He was 67, and suffered from Stage IV bone cancer prior to his death.

== NBA career statistics ==
Legend
GP	Games played	GS	Games started	MPG	Minutes per game
FG%	Field goal percentage	3P%	3-point field goal percentage	FT%	Free throw percentage
RPG	Rebounds per game	APG	Assists per game	SPG	Steals per game
BPG	Blocks per game	PPG	Points per game	**Bold**	Career high

=== Regular season ===
Year	Team	GP	GS	MPG	FG%	3P%	FT%	RPG	APG	SPG	BPG	PPG
1974–75	Atlanta	78	–	29.3	.428	–	.713	**10.7**	1.8	1.5	**0.5**	18.5
1975–76	Atlanta	77	–	30.5	**.502**	–	.744	8.6	1.9	**1.8**	0.4	21.6
1976–77	Atlanta	74	–	**36.3**	.487	–	.714	9.1	1.8	1.4	0.4	**24.2**
1977–78	Atlanta	70	–	31.5	.480	–	.760	7.3	**2.0**	1.7	0.4	23.2
1978–79	Atlanta	79	–	30.5	.473	–	.731	6.6	1.5	1.6	0.2	22.7
1979–80	Atlanta	80	–	28.8	.453	.000	.757	5.9	1.3	1.1	0.3	19.5
1980–81	Atlanta	67	–	31.0	.456	.000	**.787**	5.7	1.2	1.5	0.2	21.7
1981–82	Atlanta	70	51	29.1	.486	**.333**	.741	5.4	1.4	0.9	0.0	18.5
1982–83	Utah	44	33	27.4	.474	.000	.755	5.3	**2.2**	0.8	0.2	21.2
1983–84	Utah	**81**	4	22.2	.479	.273	.778	4.2	1.7	1.1	0.0	17.7
1984–85	Utah	19	16	24.4	.412	.000	.770	4.3	1.8	1.2	0.1	16.2
Career		739	104	29.5	.470	.175	.748	6.9	1.7	1.4	0.3	20.7
All-Star		2	1	12.0	.143	–	.800	3.0	0.0	1.0	0.0	3.0

=== Playoffs ===
Year	Team	GP	GS	MPG	FG%	3P%	FT%	RPG	APG	SPG	BPG	PPG
1978	Atlanta	2	–	**39.5**	.429	–	.625	**7.5**	**1.5**	0.5	**0.5**	**26.0**
1979	Atlanta	9	–	30.6	.420	–	.761	6.7	0.8	1.0	0.4	16.1
1980	Atlanta	5	–	30.0	.381	–	.714	6.0	0.8	**1.4**	0.0	14.6
1982	Atlanta	2	–	29.5	.364	–	.583	5.0	0.5	0.0	0.0	11.5
1984	Utah	**11**	–	15.6	**.506**	–	**.788**	2.3	0.8	0.4	0.0	10.2
Career		29	–	25.3	.431	–	.725	4.8	0.8	0.7	0.2	14.0

== See also ==
- List of players banned or suspended by the NBA
