= Roy Hamilton (basketball) =

American basketball player (born 1957)

Personal information
- Born: July 20, 1957 (age 69) Los Angeles, California, U.S.
- Listed height: 6 ft 2 in (1.88 m)
- Listed weight: 180 lb (82 kg)

Career information
- High school: Verbum Dei (Los Angeles, California)
- College: UCLA (1975–1979)
- NBA draft: 1979: 1st round, 10th overall pick
- Drafted by: Detroit Pistons
- Position: Point guard
- Number: 24, 23

Career history
- 1979–1980: Detroit Pistons
- 1980: Portland Trail Blazers

Career highlights
- Third-team All-American – AP (1979); 2× First-team All-Pac-10 (1978, 1979); Second-team All-Pac-8 (1977); First-team Parade All-American (1975)
- Stats at NBA.com
- Stats at Basketball Reference

Roy Lee Hamilton (born July 20, 1957) is an American former professional basketball player who played in the National Basketball Association (NBA) who is currently a coordinating producer for Fox Sports Net. He played college basketball for the UCLA Bruins from 1975 to 1979. He was selected in the first round as the 10th overall pick in the 1979 NBA draft by the Detroit Pistons. He played one season with the Pistons and another with the Portland Trail Blazers. He briefly played in the Continental Basketball Association before pursuing another dream of working on sports television. He thought the odds of his return to the NBA were slim after having already been cut, and did not want to become "bitter and disappointed".

Hamilton became a television commentator for UCLA in the 1982–83 season. He started in an entry-level broadcast position for CBS Sports in New York and later became one of CBS's top National Football League (NFL) producers. When the network lost their NFL contract to Fox in 1993, he joined Fox along with some other CBS personnel. As of 2001, Hamilton was one of the highest-ranking African Americans working on sports television production as Fox Sports Net's coordinating producer of college football and regional NBA coverage. He also oversaw Fox's Sunday coverage of Atlantic Coast Conference basketball.

== Career statistics ==
Legend
GP	Games played	GS	Games started	MPG	Minutes per game
FG%	Field goal percentage	3P%	3-point field goal percentage	FT%	Free throw percentage
RPG	Rebounds per game	APG	Assists per game	SPG	Steals per game
BPG	Blocks per game	PPG	Points per game	**Bold**	Career high

=== NBA ===
==== Regular season ====
Year	Team	GP	MPG	FG%	3P%	FT%	RPG	APG	SPG	BPG	PPG
1979–80	Detroit	**72**	**15.5**	**.401**	.000	**.687**	1.5	**2.7**	**.7**	**.1**	**4.6**
1980–81	Portland	1	5.0	.333	–	.500	**3.0**	.0	.0	.0	3.0
Career		73	15.4	.400	.000	.684	1.5	2.6	.7	.1	4.6
