= Sylvester Norris (basketball) =

American basketball player (born 1957)

Personal information
- Born: February 18, 1957 (age 69) Jackson, Mississippi, U.S.
- Listed height: 6 ft 11 in (2.11 m)
- Listed weight: 220 lb (100 kg)

Career information
- High school: Jim Hill (Jackson, Mississippi)
- College: Jackson State (1975–1978)
- NBA draft: 1979: 3rd round, 63rd overall pick
- Drafted by: San Antonio Spurs
- Playing career: 1979–1983
- Position: Center
- Number: 40

Career history
- 1979–1980: San Antonio Spurs
- 1982–1983: Roseto
- Stats at NBA.com
- Stats at Basketball Reference

Sylvester Norris (born February 18, 1957) is an American former professional basketball player. He played in the National Basketball Association (NBA) for the San Antonio Spurs in 17 games during the 1979–80 season. He averaged 2.4 points and 2.5 rebounds per game.

He is the older brother of Audie Norris, who also played in the NBA for the Portland Trail Blazers.

== Career statistics ==
Legend
GP	Games played	GS	Games started	MPG	Minutes per game
FG%	Field goal percentage	3P%	3-point field goal percentage	FT%	Free throw percentage
RPG	Rebounds per game	APG	Assists per game	SPG	Steals per game
BPG	Blocks per game	PPG	Points per game	**Bold**	Career high

=== NBA ===
==== Regular season ====
Year	Team	GP	MPG	FG%	3P%	FT%	RPG	APG	SPG	BPG	PPG
1979–80	San Antonio	17	11.1	.419	–	.667	2.5	.4	.2	.7	2.4
