= 1979–80 New Jersey Nets season =

NBA basketball team season

- Head coach: Kevin Loughery
- Arena: Rutgers Athletic Center

Results
- Record: 34–48 (.415)
- Place: Division: 5th (Atlantic); Conference: 10th (Eastern)
- Playoff finish: Did not qualify
- Stats at Basketball Reference

Local media
- Television: WOR-TV; SportsChannel New York
- Radio: WVNJ

The 1979–80 New Jersey Nets season was the Nets' fourth season in the NBA.

== Draft picks ==
| Round | Pick | Player | Position | Nationality | College |
|---|---|---|---|---|---|
| 1 | 8 | Calvin Natt | SF | United States | Northeast Louisiana |
| 3 | 51 | John Gerdy | SG | United States | Davidson |
| 5 | 95 | Jim Abromaitis | F | United States | Connecticut |
| 6 | 115 | Tony Smith^{1} | SG | United States | UNLV |
| 7 | 135 | Jim Strickland | | United States | South Carolina |
| 8 | 154 | Henry Hollingsworth | PG | United States | Hofstra |
| 9 | 173 | Ricky Free | | United States | Columbia |
| 10 | 191 | Eric Fleisher | | United States | Tulane |

^1 Not to be confused with the 1990s basketball player Tony Smith.

== Roster ==
1979–80 New Jersey Nets roster
Players

| Pos. | No. | Player | Height | Weight | DOB | From |
|---|---|---|---|---|---|---|
| G | 34 | Winford Boynes | 6 ft 6 in (1.98 m) | 185 lb (84 kg) | 1957-05-17 | San Francisco |
| F/C | 54 | Bob Elliott | 6 ft 9 in (2.06 m) | 225 lb (102 kg) | 1955-08-18 | Arizona |
| C | 52 | George Johnson | 6 ft 11 in (2.11 m) | 205 lb (93 kg) | 1948-12-18 | Dillard |
| G | 15 | Eddie Jordan | 6 ft 1 in (1.85 m) | 170 lb (77 kg) | 1955-01-29 | Rutgers |
| F | 33 | Maurice Lucas | 6 ft 9 in (2.06 m) | 215 lb (98 kg) | 1952-02-18 | Marquette |
| G | 14 | Mike Newlin | 6 ft 4 in (1.93 m) | 200 lb (91 kg) | 1949-02-02 | Utah |
| G | 22 | Roger Phegley | 6 ft 6 in (1.98 m) | 205 lb (93 kg) | 1956-10-16 | Bradley |
| F | 44 | Cliff Robinson | 6 ft 9 in (2.06 m) | 220 lb (100 kg) | 1960-03-13 | USC |
| G | 10 | Robert Smith | 5 ft 11 in (1.80 m) | 165 lb (75 kg) | 1955-03-10 | UNLV |
| F | 20 | Jan van Breda Kolff | 6 ft 7 in (2.01 m) | 195 lb (88 kg) | 1951-12-16 | Vanderbilt |

Coaches
Head coach
- Kevin Loughery
Assistant(s)
- Phil Jackson

Legend
- (DP) Unsigned draft pick
- (FA) Free agent
- (S) Suspended
- Injured

== Regular season ==
=== Season standings ===
| Atlantic Division | W | L | PCT | GB | Home | Road | Div |
|---|---|---|---|---|---|---|---|
| y-Boston Celtics | 61 | 21 | .744 | – | 35–6 | 26–15 | 17–7 |
| x-Philadelphia 76ers | 59 | 23 | .720 | 2 | 36–5 | 23–18 | 19–5 |
| x-Washington Bullets | 39 | 43 | .476 | 22 | 24–17 | 15–26 | 9–15 |
| New York Knicks | 39 | 43 | .476 | 22 | 25–16 | 14–27 | 8–16 |
| New Jersey Nets | 34 | 48 | .415 | 27 | 22–19 | 12–29 | 7–17 |

| # | Eastern Conference | | | | |
| # | Team | W | L | PCT | GB |
|---|---|---|---|---|---|
| 1 | z-Boston Celtics | 61 | 21 | .744 | – |
| 2 | y-Atlanta Hawks | 50 | 32 | .610 | 11 |
| 3 | x-Philadelphia 76ers | 59 | 23 | .720 | 2 |
| 4 | x-Houston Rockets | 41 | 41 | .500 | 20 |
| 5 | x-San Antonio Spurs | 41 | 41 | .500 | 20 |
| 6 | x-Washington Bullets | 39 | 43 | .476 | 22 |
| 7 | New York Knicks | 39 | 43 | .476 | 22 |
| 8 | Cleveland Cavaliers | 37 | 45 | .451 | 24 |
| 8 | Indiana Pacers | 37 | 45 | .451 | 24 |
| 10 | New Jersey Nets | 34 | 48 | .415 | 27 |
| 11 | Detroit Pistons | 16 | 66 | .195 | 44 |

z - clinched division title
y - clinched division title
x - clinched playoff spot

== See also ==
- 1979-80 NBA season
