= 1979–80 Indiana Pacers season =

NBA professional basketball team season

- Head coach: Bobby Leonard
- Arena: Market Square Arena

Results
- Record: 37–45 (.451)
- Place: Division: 5th (Central); Conference: 9th (Eastern)
- Playoff finish: Did not qualify
- Stats at Basketball Reference

Local media
- Television: WTTV
- Radio: WNDE

The 1979–80 Indiana Pacers season was Indiana's fourth season in the NBA and 13th season as a franchise. This was the team's first season in the Eastern Conference since joining the league, replacing the now-relocated Utah Jazz in the Central Division.

== Offseason ==
=== Draft picks ===
Round	Pick	Player	Position	Nationality	College

== Roster ==
1979–80 Indiana Pacers roster
Players

Pos.	No.	Player	Height	Weight	DOB	From
F	42	Mike Bantom	6 ft 9 in (2.06 m)	200 lb (91 kg)	1951–12–03	Saint Joseph's
G/F	7	Dudley Bradley	6 ft 6 in (1.98 m)	195 lb (88 kg)	1957–03–19	North Carolina
G	16	Johnny Davis	6 ft 2 in (1.88 m)	170 lb (77 kg)	1955–10–21	Dayton
C	40	James Edwards	7 ft 0 in (2.13 m)	225 lb (102 kg)	1955–11–22	Washington
G	10	Joe Hassett	6 ft 5 in (1.96 m)	180 lb (82 kg)	1955-09-11	Providence
F/C	45	Clemon Johnson	6 ft 10 in (2.08 m)	240 lb (109 kg)	1956–09–12	Florida A&M
F	8	Mickey Johnson	6 ft 10 in (2.08 m)	190 lb (86 kg)	1952-08-31	Aurora
G/F	25	Billy Knight	6 ft 6 in (1.98 m)	195 lb (88 kg)	1952–06–09	Pittsburgh
G	5	John Kuester	6 ft 2 in (1.88 m)	180 lb (82 kg)	1955-02-06	North Carolina
F	30	George McGinnis	6 ft 8 in (2.03 m)	235 lb (107 kg)	1950-08-12	Indiana

Coaches
Head coach

Bobby Leonard

Legend
- (DP) Unsigned draft pick
- (FA) Free agent
- (S) Suspended
- Injured

== Regular season ==
=== Season standings ===
Central Division	W	L	PCT	GB	Home	Road	Div
y-Atlanta Hawks	50	32	.610	–	32–9	18–23	21–9
x-Houston Rockets	41	41	.500	9	29–12	12–29	20–10
x-San Antonio Spurs	41	41	.500	9	27–14	14–27	14–16
Cleveland Cavaliers	37	45	.451	13	28–13	9–32	16–14
Indiana Pacers	37	45	.451	13	26–15	11–30	15–15
Detroit Pistons	16	66	.195	34	13–28	3–38	4–26

#	Eastern Conference				
#	Team	W	L	PCT	GB
1	z-Boston Celtics	61	21	.744	–
2	y-Atlanta Hawks	50	32	.610	11
3	x-Philadelphia 76ers	59	23	.720	2
4	x-Houston Rockets	41	41	.500	20
5	x-San Antonio Spurs	41	41	.500	20
6	x-Washington Bullets	39	43	.476	22
7	New York Knicks	39	43	.476	22
8	Cleveland Cavaliers	37	45	.451	24
8	Indiana Pacers	37	45	.451	24
10	New Jersey Nets	34	48	.415	27
11	Detroit Pistons	16	66	.195	44

z - clinched division title
y - clinched division title
x - clinched playoff spot

== Game log ==
=== Regular season ===
1979–80 game log
Total: 37–45 (Home: 26–15; Road: 11–30)
October: 5–6 (home: 5–0; road: 0–6)

Game	Date	Team	Score	High points	High rebounds	High assists	Location Attendance	Record
2	October 13, 1979	Atlanta	W 115–101				Market Square Arena	1–1
4	October 17, 1979	@ Houston	L 112–116				The Summit	2–2
5	October 18, 1979	@ Atlanta	L 85–115				The Omni	2–3
6	October 20, 1979	Boston	W 131–128 (OT)				Market Square Arena	3–3
8	October 24, 1979	@ Philadelphia	L 110–132				The Spectrum	3–5
11	October 31, 1979	Houston	W 133–129 (OT)				Market Square Arena	5–6

November: 6–9 (home: 3–2; road: 3–7)

Game	Date	Team	Score	High points	High rebounds	High assists	Location Attendance	Record
13	November 3, 1979	Philadelphia	L 114–120 (2OT)				Market Square Arena	5–8
18	November 14, 1979	@ Phoenix	L 100–104				Arizona Veterans Memorial Coliseum	8–10
20	November 18, 1979	@ Los Angeles	L 104–127				The Forum	8–12
22	November 23, 1979	@ Boston	L 103–118				Boston Garden	9–13
24	November 26, 1979	@ Philadelphia	L 112–113				The Spectrum	10–14
25	November 28, 1979	Milwaukee	L 79–87				Market Square Arena	10–15

December: 6–6 (home: 4–3; road: 2–3)

Game	Date	Team	Score	High points	High rebounds	High assists	Location Attendance	Record
27	December 1, 1979	Boston	L 102–106 (OT)				Market Square Arena	11–16
31	December 12, 1979	Seattle	L 107–112				Market Square Arena	14–27
35	December 22, 1979	Atlanta	W 130–110				Market Square Arena	16–19

January: 9–7 (home: 6–3; road: 3–4)

Game	Date	Team	Score	High points	High rebounds	High assists	Location Attendance	Record
39	January 2, 1980	Los Angeles	L 120–127				Market Square Arena	17–22
40	January 3, 1980	@ Milwaukee	L 96–106				MECCA Arena	17–23
43	January 9, 1980	@ Seattle	L 111–120				Kingdome	18–25
52	January 29, 1980	Houston	W 133–112				Market Square Arena	26–26

February: 5–7 (home: 4–4; road: 1–3)

Game	Date	Team	Score	High points	High rebounds	High assists	Location Attendance	Record
55	February 5, 1980	Philadelphia	L 120–127				Market Square Arena	26–29
57	February 8, 1980	@ Boston	L 108–130				Boston Garden	27–30
64	February 24, 1980	Phoenix	L 105–113				Market Square Arena	31–33
65	February 26, 1980	@ Houston	L 88–93				The Summit	31–34
66	February 27, 1980	@ Atlanta	L 111–116				The Omni	31–35

March: 6–10 (home: 4–3; road: 2–7)

Game	Date	Team	Score	High points	High rebounds	High assists	Location Attendance	Record
69	March 5, 1980	@ Philadelphia	L 113–120				The Spectrum	31–38
70	March 7, 1980	Atlanta	L 94–99				Market Square Arena	31–39
72	March 11, 1980	Boston	W 114–108				Market Square Arena	32–40
74	March 14, 1980	Philadelphia	W 104–94				Market Square Arena	34–40
75	March 16, 1980	@ Atlanta	L 90–95				The Omni	34–41
76	March 18, 1980	@ Boston	L 102–114				Hartford Civic Center	34–42
79	March 22, 1980	@ Houston	L 110–125				The Summit	35–44
82	March 30, 1980	Houston	L 106–121				Market Square Arena	37–45

1979–80 schedule

== Player statistics ==
=== Ragular season ===
Player	POS	GP	GS	MP	REB	AST	STL	BLK	PTS	MPG	RPG	APG	SPG	BPG	PPG
Johnny Davis	PG	82	82	2,912	226	440	110	23	1,300	35.5	2.8	5.4	1.3	.3	15.9
James Edwards	C	82	82	2,314	578	127	55	104	1,287	28.2	7.0	1.5	.7	1.3	15.7
Mickey Johnson	PF	82		2,647	681	344	153	112	1,566	32.3	8.3	4.2	1.9	1.4	19.1
Dudley Bradley	SG	82		2,027	223	252	211	48	688	24.7	2.7	3.1	2.6	.6	8.4
Clemon Johnson	C	79		1,541	394	115	48	121	472	19.5	5.0	1.5	.6	1.5	6.0
Mike Bantom	SF	77		2,330	456	279	85	49	908	30.3	5.9	3.6	1.1	.6	11.8
Billy Knight	SF	75		1,910	361	155	82	9	986	25.5	4.8	2.1	1.1	.1	13.1
Joe Hassett	SG	74		1,135	94	104	46	8	523	15.3	1.3	1.4	.6	.1	7.1
Alex English^{†}	SF	54		1,526	380	142	45	33	806	28.3	7.0	2.6	.8	.6	14.9
George McGinnis^{†}	PF	28		784	237	112	32	6	369	28.0	8.5	4.0	1.1	.2	13.2
John Kuester	PG	24		100	14	16	7	1	29	4.2	.6	.7	.3	.0	1.2
Phil Chenier^{†}	SG	23		380	35	47	15	10	124	16.5	1.5	2.0	.7	.4	5.4
Ron Carter	SG	13		117	19	9	2	3	32	9.0	1.5	.7	.2	.2	2.5
Tony Zeno	SF	8		59	14	1	4	3	14	7.4	1.8	.1	.5	.4	1.8
Corky Calhoun	SF	7		30	10	0	2	0	8	4.3	1.4	.0	.3	.0	1.1
Brad Davis^{†}	PG	5		43	2	5	3	0	7	8.6	.4	1.0	.6	.0	1.4

- ^{†} Denotes player spent time with another team in the season. Stats reflect time with the Pacers only.

== Awards and records ==
- Don Buse, NBA All-Defensive First Team

== See also ==
- 1979-80 NBA season
