= Eddie Johnson (basketball, born 1955) =

American basketball player (1955–2020)

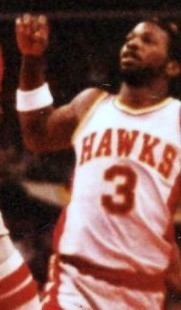
- Johnson with the Atlanta Hawks in 1981

Personal information
- Born: February 24, 1955 Ocala, Florida, U.S.
- Died: October 26, 2020 (aged 65) Milton, Florida, U.S.
- Listed height: 6 ft 2 in (1.88 m)
- Listed weight: 180 lb (82 kg)

Career information
- High school: Lake Weir (Summerfield, Florida)
- College: Auburn (1973–1977)
- NBA draft: 1977: 3rd round, 49th overall pick
- Drafted by: Atlanta Hawks
- Playing career: 1977–1987
- Position: Shooting guard
- Number: 3, 15

Career history
- 1977–1986: Atlanta Hawks
- 1986: Cleveland Cavaliers
- 1986–1987: Tampa Bay Thrillers
- 1987: Seattle SuperSonics

Career highlights
- 2× NBA All-Star (1980, 1981); 2× NBA All-Defensive Second Team (1979, 1980); CBA All-Star Game MVP (1987); All-CBA First Team (1987); CBA Newcomer of the Year (1987); 3× First-team All-SEC (1974–1976)

Career NBA statistics
- Points: 10,163 (15.1 ppg)
- Rebounds: 1,522 (2.3 rpg)
- Assists: 3,436 (5.1 apg)
- Stats at NBA.com
- Stats at Basketball Reference

Edward Lee Johnson Jr. (February 24, 1955 – October 26, 2020) was an American professional basketball player. He played 10 seasons in the National Basketball Association (NBA) – mainly as a member of the Atlanta Hawks – from 1977 to 1987. Johnson was a two-time NBA-All-Star with the Hawks in 1980 and 1981, and earned two nominations to the NBA All-Defensive Second Team in 1979 and 1980. He was nicknamed "Fast Eddie" for his speed and quickness on the court.

Johnson's notorious off-court behaviour due to drug abuse harmed his reputation as a player. He was traded by the Hawks to the Cleveland Cavaliers for the end of the 1985–86 season. He played for the Tampa Bay Thrillers in the Continental Basketball Association (CBA) during the 1986–87 season in an attempt to return to the NBA and received a mid-season call-up to play for the Seattle SuperSonics in what would be his final professional stint. Johnson's playing career ended when he received a suspension by the NBA due to a cocaine addiction in 1987. His life after basketball delved further into criminal activities and culminated in Johnson being sentenced to life in prison for sex crimes on a minor in 2008. He died of an undisclosed illness while serving his sentence.

== Early life and college career ==
Johnson was born in Ocala, Florida, and raised in Weirsdale, Florida, as the oldest of five children. His father worked as a laborer. Johnson played basketball with a homemade goal outside his family's house. He was one of the first black students to attend a previously all-white grade school in Weirsdale. He attended Lake Weir High School and started all four years he played. Johnson graduated from Lake Weir as one of the top students in his class.

Johnson played college basketball for the Auburn Tigers from 1973 to 1977. He led the Southeastern Conference (SEC) in scoring as a freshman with 21.8 points per game. Johnson led the Tigers in scoring and assists for his first three seasons, and was nominated to the All-SEC Coaches' first-team from 1974 to 1976. He allegedly had conflicts with Tigers coach Bob Davis who accused Johnson of having "a bad attitude". Johnson's scoring average dipped each season with the Tigers and caused worry amongst professional scouts as to if he was a problematic player.

== Professional career ==
Johnson was selected by the Atlanta Hawks as the 49th overall pick of the 1977 NBA draft. Averaging 10.5 points, the rookie helped the Hawks return to the playoffs after a four-year absence, a feat repeated in six of Johnson's eight full years with the club.

Johnson became a starter in 1978–79. During that season, Johnson advanced as far as he ever would in pursuit of an NBA championship, losing in the conference semifinals to the Washington Bullets. He was a starter four consecutive seasons, averaging at least 16 points each season. Fans voted Johnson into a starting spot in the 1980 NBA All-Star Game, where he scored 22 points on 11-of-16 shooting. He returned as a starter in the 1981 NBA All-Star Game, where he scored 16 points on 7-of-12 shooting.

Johnson was traded to the Cleveland Cavaliers for Johnny Davis during the 1985–86 NBA season. He considered his year with the Cavaliers to be "a waste." Johnson played in the Continental Basketball Association for the Tampa Bay Thrillers during the 1986–87 season as he needed visibility to work his way back into the NBA. He averaged 22 points, 2.5 rebounds and 4.0 assists in 26 games played with the Thrillers. Johnson was named the CBA Newcomer of the Year, nominated to the All-CBA First Team and selected as the CBA All-Star Game Most Valuable Player in 1987.

Johnson signed a contract with the Seattle SuperSonics as they needed an experienced guard for the end of the 1986–87 NBA season. SuperSonics coach Bernie Bickerstaff had a closed-door meeting with his players before Johnson was signed while the team assigned someone to monitor Johnson's activities due to their wariness of his volatility.

Johnson was considered a desirable person during the NBA season who went out of control during offseasons. Pat Williams, who was then general manager of the Philadelphia 76ers, stated: "Eddie became a time bomb every summer." Johnson battled a cocaine addiction throughout his career. After several suspensions, he finally checked himself into rehab in 1986. After he failed to follow through on mandatory counseling, the NBA suspended him in 1987, with Johnson never returning to play again afterward.

Johnson averaged 15.1 points per game in 675 games played during his 10-year NBA career.

== Personal life ==
Johnson's younger brother, Frank, is a former player and coach in the NBA. He was a distant cousin of fellow basketball player Tree Rollins, who was his teammate on the Hawks.

Johnson had three children.

=== Off-court issues and imprisonment ===
Johnson first began using cocaine as a college student. He passed out during a celebratory function at Auburn in 1979 in what was the first public indication of his drug habits. Johnson denied that his drug habits led to his personal issues and stated: "The whole idea of me abusing drugs is outlandish."

During the 1980 NBA off-season, Johnson escaped unharmed after he jumped off a second-story apartment balcony and fled across a parking lot while two men fired gunshots at him in what police believed was part of a drug dispute. Three weeks later, he was arrested for possession of cocaine while driving a rental car in Atlanta but the charges were dropped because the police's search of the car was deemed illegal. Johnson was taken to a private psychiatric facility in Cobb County, Georgia, and underwent therapy for almost a week. The day after Johnson checked himself out of the facility, he was arrested for stealing a car from a car dealer but the charges were again dropped.

Johnson was diagnosed with manic depression by psychiatrists in the Cobb County facility; he doubted the accuracy of the diagnosis. He was prescribed with lithium tablets that he stopped taking during the 1980–81 NBA season without the knowledge of the Hawks team. Johnson believed that he no longer needed the medication and that it contributed to his tiredness during games. The Hawks became aware of the resumption of Johnson's erratic behavior in July 1981 and persuaded him to submit to a local hospital. Johnson showed up at the Hawks' training camp in October directly from the hospital and became increasingly disruptive as he rebuked teammates, left the floor to play with a child in the stands, and jumped rope on the sidelines while oblivious to his surroundings during practice sessions. After being so alarmed by his actions, Atlanta Hawks President Michael Gearon and General Manager Stan Kasten contacted Johnson's psychiatrist, who signed a commitment order to have Johnson placed in Grady Memorial Hospital. Johnson was picked up by police before a planned practice session and taken to Grady. Johnson was taken off the Hawks' suspended list on November 21, 1981.

Johnson's life continued to spiral out of control following his banishment from the NBA. He was arrested and convicted for a litany of crimes over the years, including burglary, battery, robbery, drug possession, assault on a police officer and resisting arrest. He admitted that he had frequent drug problems which had initially cost him his career. Johnson's rap sheet numbered about 100 arrests and five stints in and out of the Florida prison system when in 2006, he was arrested for sexually assaulting an 8-year-old girl in her home at Parkside Garden Apartments in Ocala, Florida. The arrest created additional controversy when multiple publications used the picture of another former NBA player (and current broadcaster) named Eddie Johnson, who believed his reputation had been damaged due to the incident.

On October 30, 2008, Johnson was convicted of sexual battery of a minor, lewd and lascivious molestation of a minor, and trespassing for the sexual assault of the 8-year-old girl. Johnson denied doing anything inappropriate. The sex crimes carried a mandatory life sentence without parole. Johnson was incarcerated at Santa Rosa Correctional Institution.

=== Death ===
Johnson died in prison on October 26, 2020, of an undisclosed illness in Milton, Florida. His death was confirmed on November 3, 2020.

== NBA career statistics ==
Legend
GP	Games played	GS	Games started	MPG	Minutes per game
FG%	Field goal percentage	3P%	3-point field goal percentage	FT%	Free throw percentage
RPG	Rebounds per game	APG	Assists per game	SPG	Steals per game
BPG	Blocks per game	PPG	Points per game	**Bold**	Career high

=== Regular season ===
Year	Team	GP	GS	MPG	FG%	3P%	FT%	RPG	APG	SPG	BPG	PPG
1977–78	Atlanta	**79**	–	23.7	.484	–	.816	1.9	3.0	1.3	.1	10.5
1978–79	Atlanta	78	–	30.9	**.510**	–	**.832**	2.2	4.6	1.6	.1	16.0
1979–80	Atlanta	**79**	–	33.2	.487	**.385**	.828	2.5	4.7	1.5	**.3**	18.5
1980–81	Atlanta	75	–	**35.9**	.504	.300	.784	2.4	5.4	**1.7**	.1	**19.1**
1981–82	Atlanta	68	57	34.0	.450	.233	.764	**2.8**	5.3	1.5	.2	17.8
1982–83	Atlanta	61	57	29.7	.453	.341	.785	2.0	5.2	1.0	.1	16.0
1983–84	Atlanta	67	43	28.3	.442	.372	.770	2.2	5.6	.9	.1	13.2
1984–85	Atlanta	73	**66**	32.4	.479	.306	.798	2.6	**7.8**	.6	.1	16.3
1985–86	Atlanta	39	5	22.1	.473	.250	.718	1.9	5.6	.3	.0	10.1
1985–86	Cleveland	32	4	19.2	.440	.369	.733	1.4	3.6	.3	.0	9.8
1986–87	Seattle	24	0	21.2	.457	.333	.764	1.9	4.8	.5	.0	9.0
Career		675	232	29.6	.476	.326	.791	2.3	5.1	1.1	.1	15.1

=== Playoffs ===
Year	Team	GP	GS	MPG	FG%	3P%	FT%	RPG	APG	SPG	BPG	PPG
1978	Atlanta	2	–	32.0	.632	–	.875	3.0	3.0	**4.0**	**.5**	15.5
1979	Atlanta	9	–	29.1	.508	–	.720	2.6	**5.0**	.4	.2	16.4
1980	Atlanta	5	–	**37.6**	.514	.000	.750	**3.6**	4.2	1.6	.4	**19.4**
1982	Atlanta	2	–	33.5	.346	.000	**1.000**	3.0	4.5	.0	**.5**	11.0
1984	Atlanta	5	–	24.6	.352	.167	.682	1.8	4.8	1.2	.0	10.8
1987	Seattle	**14**	0	12.9	**.534**	**.400**	.867	1.0	3.2	.4	.0	6.4
Career		37	0	23.9	.485	.273	.778	2.1	4.1	.8	.2	11.9

== See also ==
- List of people banned or suspended by the NBA
