= 1979–80 Detroit Pistons season =

NBA team season

- Head coach: Dick Vitale; Richie Adubato
- General manager: Jack McCloskey
- Owners: William Davidson
- Arena: Pontiac Silverdome

Results
- Record: 16–66 (.195)
- Place: Division: 6th (Central); Conference: 11th (Eastern)
- Playoff finish: Did not qualify
- Stats at Basketball Reference

Local media
- Television: WKBD-TV
- Radio: WJR

The 1979–80 Detroit Pistons season was the Detroit Pistons' 32nd season in the NBA and 23rd season in the city of Detroit. The Pistons were coming off a 30–52 (.366) record from their first season in the Eastern Conference, and aiming to halt declines of six and eight wins from their previous two seasons, but by finishing 16–66 (.195) they had the worst record in franchise history at the time, and the worst NBA record since the 1972–73 Philadelphia 76ers won only nine games.

Coach Dick Vitale, who was also in charge of player personnel, was fired 12 games into the season, having pushed for a disastrous trade with the Boston Celtics for Bob McAdoo when Pistons free agent M.L. Carr signed with Boston that would eventually net the Celtics key championship components Carr, Robert Parish, and Kevin McHale in a series of exchanges. Injuries to McAdoo and center Bob Lanier, who was traded to the Milwaukee Bucks during the season, left the Pistons a depleted roster and the team finished with fourteen consecutive defeats. Second year players John Long (19.4 ppg) and Terry Tyler (12.3 ppg, 7.6 rpg) had solid seasons to lead the overwhelmed Pistons.

Vitale never coached again following his dismissal. He began a long and successful career as a television analyst at fledgling cable network ESPN approximately a month after leaving the bench.

== Draft picks ==
Round	Pick	Player	Position	Nationality	College
1	4	Greg Kelser	SF	United States	Michigan State
1	10	Roy Hamilton	PG	United States	UCLA
1	15	Phil Hubbard	PF	United States	Michigan
3	48	Terry Duerod	SG	United States	Detroit

== Roster ==
1979–80 Detroit Pistons roster
Players

Pos.	No.	Player	Height	Weight	DOB	From
C	54	Kent Benson	6 ft 10 in (2.08 m)	235 lb (107 kg)		Indiana
C	13	Leon Douglas	6 ft 10 in (2.08 m)	230 lb (104 kg)		Alabama
G/F	42	Terry Duerod	6 ft 2 in (1.88 m)	180 lb (82 kg)		Detroit Mercy
F	21	Earl Evans	6 ft 8 in (2.03 m)	202 lb (92 kg)		UNLV
G	24	Roy Hamilton	6 ft 2 in (1.88 m)	180 lb (82 kg)		UCLA
SF	35	Phil Hubbard	6 ft 8 in (2.03 m)	215 lb (98 kg)		Michigan
F	32	Greg Kelser	6 ft 7 in (2.01 m)	205 lb (93 kg)		Michigan State
G	30	Ron Lee	6 ft 4 in (1.93 m)	193 lb (88 kg)		Oregon
SG	25	John Long	6 ft 5 in (1.96 m)	195 lb (88 kg)		Detroit Mercy
PF	44	Steve Malovic	6 ft 9 in (2.06 m)	210 lb (95 kg)		San Diego State
C	11	Bob McAdoo	6 ft 9 in (2.06 m)	210 lb (95 kg)		North Carolina
G	14	Eric Money	6 ft 0 in (1.83 m)	175 lb (79 kg)		Arizona
F	9	Jackie Robinson	6 ft 6 in (1.98 m)	210 lb (95 kg)		UNLV
G/F	41	Terry Tyler	6 ft 7 in (2.01 m)	215 lb (98 kg)		Detroit Mercy

Coaches
Head coach
- Dick Vitale
- Richie Adubato
Assistant(s)
- Herman Kull

Legend
- (DP) Unsigned draft pick
- (FA) Free agent
- (S) Suspended
- Injured

== Regular season ==
=== Season standings ===
Central Division	W	L	PCT	GB	Home	Road	Div
y-Atlanta Hawks	50	32	.610	–	32–9	18–23	21–9
x-Houston Rockets	41	41	.500	9	29–12	12–29	20–10
x-San Antonio Spurs	41	41	.500	9	27–14	14–27	14–16
Cleveland Cavaliers	37	45	.451	13	28–13	9–32	16–14
Indiana Pacers	37	45	.451	13	26–15	11–30	15–15
Detroit Pistons	16	66	.195	34	13–28	3–38	4–26

#	Eastern Conference				
#	Team	W	L	PCT	GB
1	z-Boston Celtics	61	21	.744	–
2	y-Atlanta Hawks	50	32	.610	11
3	x-Philadelphia 76ers	59	23	.720	2
4	x-Houston Rockets	41	41	.500	20
5	x-San Antonio Spurs	41	41	.500	20
6	x-Washington Bullets	39	43	.476	22
7	New York Knicks	39	43	.476	22
8	Cleveland Cavaliers	37	45	.451	24
8	Indiana Pacers	37	45	.451	24
10	New Jersey Nets	34	48	.415	27
11	Detroit Pistons	16	66	.195	44

z - clinched division title
y - clinched division title
x - clinched playoff spot

== Game log ==
=== Regular season ===
1979–80 game log
Total: 16–66 (Home: 13–28; Road: 3–38)
October: 4–5 (home: 3–1; road: 1–4)

Game	Date	Team	Score	High points	High rebounds	High assists	Location Attendance	Record
1	October 12	Indiana	W 114–105				Pontiac Silverdome	1–0
2	October 13	@ San Antonio	W 112–110				HemisFair Arena	2–0
3	October 16	@ Cleveland	L 117–137				Richfield Coliseum	2–1
4	October 18	New York	W 129–115				Pontiac Silverdome	3–1
5	October 19	@ Philadelphia	L 104–112				The Spectrum	3–2
6	October 20	@ Washington	L 106–117				Capital Centre	3–3
7	October 24	Washington	W 104–103				Pontiac Silverdome	4–3
8	October 26	San Antonio	L 113–129				Pontiac Silverdome	4–4
9	October 27	@ Milwaukee	L 118–132				MECCA Arena	4–5

November: 3–11 (home: 3–5; road: 0–6)

Game	Date	Team	Score	High points	High rebounds	High assists	Location Attendance	Record
10	November 1	Cleveland	L 125–127				Pontiac Silverdome	4–6
11	November 3	Houston	L 111–114				Pontiac Silverdome	4–7
12	November 7	Atlanta	L 107–115				Pontiac Silverdome	4–8
13	November 9	Philadelphia	W 106–98				Pontiac Silverdome	5–8
14	November 10	@ Houston	L 104–112				The Summit	5–9
15	November 14	@ Boston	L 111–115				Boston Garden	5–10
16	November 17	New Jersey	L 93–98				Pontiac Silverdome	5–11
17	November 20	@ Atlanta	L 105–109				The Omni	5–12
18	November 21	Utah	W 98–93				Pontiac Silverdome	6–12
19	November 23	Milwaukee	W 119–100				Pontiac Silverdome	7–12
20	November 24	@ Indiana	L 97–115				Market Square Arena	7–13
21	November 27	@ New York	L 114–116 (OT)				Madison Square Garden	7–14
22	November 28	@ New Jersey	L 89–98				Rutgers Athletic Center	7–15
23	November 29	Kansas City	L 95–105				Pontiac Silverdome	7–16

December: 3–13 (home: 2–4; road: 1–9)

Game	Date	Team	Score	High points	High rebounds	High assists	Location Attendance	Record
24	December 1	San Antonio	W 134–124				Pontiac Silverdome	8–16
25	December 4	Boston	L 114–118 (OT)				Pontiac Silverdome	8–17
26	December 5	@ Kansas City	L 93–109				Municipal Auditorium	8–18
27	December 7	@ Houston	L 109–124				The Summit	8–19
28	December 8	@ Indiana	L 102–103				Market Square Arena	8–20
29	December 12	@ Golden State	W 114–96				Oakland–Alameda County Coliseum Arena	9–20
30	December 14	@ Los Angeles	L 122–138				The Forum	9–21
31	December 15	@ Phoenix	L 105–126				Arizona Veterans Memorial Coliseum	9–22
32	December 16	@ San Diego	L 126–133				San Diego Sports Arena	9–23
33	December 18	Philadelphia	L 102–114				Pontiac Silverdome	9–24
34	December 20	Atlanta	L 103–122				Pontiac Silverdome	9–25
35	December 22	@ San Antonio	L 112–141				HemisFair Arena	9–26
36	December 25	@ Cleveland	L 101–111				Richfield Coliseum	9–27
37	December 26	Indiana	L 97–98				Pontiac Silverdome	9–28
38	December 28	Denver	W 114–98				Pontiac Silverdome	10–28
39	December 29	@ Atlanta	L 104–115				The Omni	10–29

January: 4–11 (home: 3–4; road: 1–7)

Game	Date	Team	Score	High points	High rebounds	High assists	Location Attendance	Record
40	January 2	@ Denver	L 116–135				McNichols Sports Arena	10–30
41	January 4	@ Seattle	L 105–123				Kingdome	10–31
42	January 6	@ Portland	L 102–119				Memorial Coliseum	10–32
43	January 8	@ Utah	L 110–124				Salt Palace	10–33
44	January 11	Los Angeles	L 100–123				Pontiac Silverdome	10–34
45	January 12	@ Indiana	L 109–122				Market Square Arena	10–35
46	January 13	Chicago	W 107–102				Pontiac Silverdome	11–35
47	January 17	Washington	W 110–107				Pontiac Silverdome	12–35
48	January 19	Houston	W 122–110				Pontiac Silverdome	13–35
49	January 22	@ Chicago	L 131–145				Chicago Stadium	13–36
50	January 23	Boston	L 104–131				Pontiac Silverdome	13–37
51	January 25	@ New Jersey	W 119–116				Rutgers Athletic Center	14–37
52	January 27	New York	L 93–98				Pontiac Silverdome	14–38
53	January 29	Golden State	L 100–111				Pontiac Silverdome	14–39
54	January 30	@ Philadelphia	L 108–121				The Spectrum	14–40

February: 1–10 (home: 1–7; road: 0–3)

Game	Date	Team	Score	High points	High rebounds	High assists	Location Attendance	Record
55	February 7	Seattle	L 102–119				Pontiac Silverdome	14–41
56	February 9	@ New York	L 107–114				Madison Square Garden	14–42
57	February 10	@ Boston	L 111–128				Boston Garden	14–43
58	February 13	Cleveland	L 102–107				Pontiac Silverdome	14–44
59	February 15	Philadelphia	L 104–114				Pontiac Silverdome	14–45
60	February 16	@ Cleveland	L 104–123				Richfield Coliseum	14–46
61	February 17	Atlanta	L 99–108				Pontiac Silverdome	14–47
62	February 21	Phoenix	L 116–125				Pontiac Silverdome	14–48
63	February 23	Portland	L 107–130				Pontiac Silverdome	14–49
64	February 27	San Diego	L 113–129				Pontiac Silverdome	14–50
65	February 29	New Jersey	W 137–128 (OT)				Pontiac Silverdome	15–50

March: 1–16 (home: 1–7; road: 0–9)

Game	Date	Team	Score	High points	High rebounds	High assists	Location Attendance	Record
66	March 2	@ Boston	L 115–118				Boston Garden	15–51
67	March 4	@ Washington	L 107–135				Capital Centre	15–52
68	March 5	New York	W 120–113				Pontiac Silverdome	16–52
69	March 7	Washington	L 105–106				Pontiac Silverdome	16–53
70	March 8	@ New York	L 104–110				Madison Square Garden	16–54
71	March 9	@ New Jersey	L 100–140				Rutgers Athletic Center	16–55
72	March 12	New Jersey	L 119–137				Pontiac Silverdome	16–56
73	March 14	San Antonio	L 102–113				Pontiac Silverdome	16–57
74	March 16	Houston	L 99–102				Pontiac Silverdome	16–58
75	March 17	@ Philadelphia	L 109–123				The Spectrum	16–59
76	March 18	Cleveland	L 107–108 (OT)				Pontiac Silverdome	16–60
77	March 20	Boston	L 106–124				Pontiac Silverdome	16–61
78	March 21	@ Atlanta	L 95–108				The Omni	16–62
79	March 23	@ Washington	L 114–119				Capital Centre	16–63
80	March 26	Indiana	L 114–124				Pontiac Silverdome	16–64
81	March 28	@ Houston	L 112–128				The Summit	16–65
82	March 30	@ San Antonio	L 124–144				HemisFair Arena	16–66

1979–80 schedule

== See also ==
- 1980 in Michigan

== See also ==
- 1979–80 NBA season
