= 1979–80 Washington Bullets season =

NBA professional basketball team season

- Head coach: Dick Motta
- General manager: Bob Ferry
- Owner: Abe Pollin
- Arena: Capital Centre

Results
- Record: 39–43 (.476)
- Place: Division: 3rd (Atlantic); Conference: 6th (Eastern)
- Playoff finish: First round (lost to 76ers 0–2)
- Stats at Basketball Reference

Local media
- Television: WDCA
- Radio: WTOP

The 1979–80 Washington Bullets season was the Bullets 19th season in the NBA and their 7th season in the city of Washington, D.C.

== Offseason ==
=== Draft picks ===
Round	Pick	Player	Position	Nationality	College

== Roster ==
1979–80 Washington Bullets roster
Players

Pos.	No.	Player	Height	Weight	DOB	From
F	42	Greg Ballard	6 ft 7 in (2.01 m)	215 lb (98 kg)		Oregon
F	12	Ron Behagen	6 ft 9 in (2.06 m)	185 lb (84 kg)		Minnesota
F	4	Lawrence Boston	6 ft 8 in (2.03 m)	225 lb (102 kg)		Maryland
PG	33	Jim Cleamons	6 ft 3 in (1.91 m)	185 lb (84 kg)		Ohio State
C	40	Dave Corzine	6 ft 11 in (2.11 m)	250 lb (113 kg)		DePaul
SF	10	Bob Dandridge (injured)	6 ft 6 in (1.98 m)	195 lb (88 kg)		Norfolk State
F	35	Kevin Grevey	6 ft 5 in (1.96 m)	210 lb (95 kg)		Kentucky
C	11	Elvin Hayes	6 ft 9 in (2.06 m)	235 lb (107 kg)		Houston
PF	25	Mitch Kupchak (injured)	6 ft 9 in (2.06 m)	230 lb (104 kg)		North Carolina
PG	1	Kevin Porter	6 ft 0 in (1.83 m)	170 lb (77 kg)		Saint Francis (PA)
F	41	Wes Unseld	6 ft 7 in (2.01 m)	245 lb (111 kg)		Louisville
G	23	John Williamson	6 ft 2 in (1.88 m)	185 lb (84 kg)		New Mexico State
G	32	Larry Wright	6 ft 1 in (1.85 m)	160 lb (73 kg)		Grambling State

Coaches
Head coach
- Dick Motta
Assistant(s)
- Bernie Bickerstaff

Legend
- (DP) Unsigned draft pick
- (FA) Free agent
- (S) Suspended
- Injured

== Regular season ==
=== Season standings ===
Atlantic Division	W	L	PCT	GB	Home	Road	Div
y-Boston Celtics	61	21	.744	–	35–6	26–15	17–7
x-Philadelphia 76ers	59	23	.720	2	36–5	23–18	19–5
x-Washington Bullets	39	43	.476	22	24–17	15–26	9–15
New York Knicks	39	43	.476	22	25–16	14–27	8–16
New Jersey Nets	34	48	.415	27	22–19	12–29	7–17

#	Eastern Conference				
#	Team	W	L	PCT	GB
1	z-Boston Celtics	61	21	.744	–
2	y-Atlanta Hawks	50	32	.610	11
3	x-Philadelphia 76ers	59	23	.720	2
4	x-Houston Rockets	41	41	.500	20
5	x-San Antonio Spurs	41	41	.500	20
6	x-Washington Bullets	39	43	.476	22
7	New York Knicks	39	43	.476	22
8	Cleveland Cavaliers	37	45	.451	24
8	Indiana Pacers	37	45	.451	24
10	New Jersey Nets	34	48	.415	27
11	Detroit Pistons	16	66	.195	44

Notes

- z, y – division champions
- x – clinched playoff spot

== Game log ==
=== Regular season ===
1979–80 game log
Total: 39–43 (home: 24–17; road: 15–26)
October: 3–5 (home: 3–1; road: 0–4)

Game	Date	Team	Score	High points	High rebounds	High assists	Location Attendance	Record
1	October 12	Philadelphia	L 92–93	Hayes (25)	Unseld (12)	Porter (11)	Capital Centre; 19,035	0–1
2	October 13	@ New York					Madison Square Garden	
3	October 17	Atlanta	W 100–97				Capital Centre; 5,804	1–2
4	October 19	@ Boston	L 93–130	Hayes (23)	Unseld (9)	Wright (5)	Boston Garden; 15,320	1–3
5	October 20	Detroit					Capital Centre	
6	October 24	@ Detroit					Pontiac Silverdome	
7	October 26	@ Indiana					Market Square Arena	
8	October 31	Cleveland					Capital Centre	

November : 6–7 (home: 3–4; road: 3–3)

Game	Date	Team	Score	High points	High rebounds	High assists	Location Attendance	Record
9	November 3	Boston	L 97–118	Ballard (23)	Hayes (12)	Porter (9)	Capital Centre; 17,635	3–6
10	November 9	San Antonio					Capital Centre	
11	November 10	@ Atlanta	L 105–109				The Omni; 15,413	4–7
12	November 13	@ New York					Madison Square Garden	
13	November 14	Chicago					Capital Centre	
14	November 16	@ New Jersey					Rutgers Athletic Center	
15	November 17	Utah					Capital Centre	
16	November 21	Cleveland					Capital Centre	
17	November 23	@ San Antonio					HemisFair Arena	
18	November 24	@ Houston					The Summit	
19	November 27	Denver					Capital Centre	
20	November 28	@ Philadelphia	L 102–120	Phegley (22)	Ballard (10)	Dandridge, Unseld (8)	The Spectrum; 10,105	9–11
21	November 30	Indiana					Capital Centre	

December : 6–7 (home: 4–5; road: 2–2)

Game	Date	Team	Score	High points	High rebounds	High assists	Location Attendance	Record
22	December 1	New Jersey					Capital Centre	
23	December 5	New York					Capital Centre	
24	December 8	Atlanta	W 96–95				Capital Centre; 14,139	11–13
25	December 11	Phoenix					Capital Centre	
26	December 13	@ Cleveland					Richfield Coliseum	
27	December 14	@ Indiana					Market Square Arena	
28	December 15	@ Chicago					Chicago Stadium	
29	December 19	Kansas City					Capital Centre	
30	December 22	Houston					Capital Centre	
31	December 25	Philadelphia	L 92–95	Hayes (29)	Unseld (14)	Cleamons (7)	Capital Centre; 18,184	14–17
32	December 26	@ New Jersey					Rutgers Athletic Center	
33	December 27	Milwaukee	W 117–108	Ballard (27)	Ballard (13)	Unseld (11)	Capital Centre; 9,693	15–18
34	December 29	San Diego					Capital Centre	

January : 8–10 (home: 4–3; road: 4–7)

Game	Date	Team	Score	High points	High rebounds	High assists	Location Attendance	Record
35	January 1	@ Portland					Memorial Coliseum	
36	January 2	@ Seattle	W 139–134 (2OT)	Hayes (34)	Unseld (19)	Dandridge (6)	Kingdome; 21,665	16–20
37	January 4	@ Golden State					Oakland-Alameda County Coliseum Arena	
38	January 5	@ Utah					Salt Palace	
39	January 9	Los Angeles	W 103–101	Hayes (25)	Ballard (13)	Cleamons, Wright (9)	Capital Centre; 19,035	19–20
40	January 11	@ Philadelphia	L 106–119	Ballard (31)	Unseld (14)	Unseld (7)	The Spectrum; 15,571	19–21
41	January 13	Portland					Capital Centre	
42	January 15	Seattle	L 100–120	Wright (20)	Unseld (9)	Unseld (8)	Capital Centre; 13,408	20–22
43	January 17	@ Detroit					Pontiac Silverdome	
44	January 18	@ Houston					The Summit	
45	January 19	@ San Antonio					HemisFair Arena	
46	January 22	@ Cleveland					Richfield Coliseum	
47	January 24	New Jersey					Capital Centre	
48	January 25	@ Boston	W 118–107	Dandridge, Hayes (25)	Unseld (19)	Cleamons; Unseld (6)	Boston Garden; 15,320	21–27
49	January 27	Golden State					Capital Centre	
50	January 29	@ Atlanta	L 82–98				The Omni; 10,269	22–28
51	January 30	Indiana					Capital Centre	
52	January 31	Boston	L 103–119	Dandridge (20)	Unseld (11)	Porter (5)	Capital Centre; 19,035	23–29

February : 6–6 (home: 4–0; road: 2–6)

Game	Date	Team	Score	High points	High rebounds	High assists	Location Attendance	Record
All-Star Break
53	February 7	@ Indiana					Market Square Arena	
54	February 8	@ Milwaukee	L 90–115	Grevey (23)	Ballard (9)	Cleamons (9)	MECCA Arena; 10,938	23–31
55	February 10	@ Kansas City					Kemper Arena	
56	February 12	@ Denver					McNichols Sports Arena	
57	February 13	@ San Diego					San Diego Sports Arena	
58	February 15	@ Phoenix					Arizona Veterans Memorial Coliseum	
59	February 17	@ Los Angeles	L 107–111	Hayes (31)	Ballard (13)	Porter (8)	The Forum; 17,505	25–34
60	February 21	Cleveland					Capital Centre	
61	February 22	San Antonio					Capital Centre	
62	February 24	New York					Capital Centre	
63	February 27	@ Houston					The Summit	
64	February 28	Houston					Capital Centre	

March : 10–8 (home: 6–4; road: 4–4)

Game	Date	Team	Score	High points	High rebounds	High assists	Location Attendance	Record
65	March 2	Indiana					Capital Centre	
66	March 4	Detroit					Capital Centre	
67	March 6	New Jersey					Capital Centre	
68	March 7	@ Detroit					Pontiac Silverdome	
69	March 9	@ Boston	W 133–128 (OT)	Hayes (35)	Hayes (17)	Wright (5)	Boston Garden; 15,320	33–36
70	March 11	San Antonio					Capital Centre	
71	March 12	@ Philadelphia	L 98–105	Ballard (32)	Unseld (16)	Unseld (8)	The Spectrum; 11,327	33–38
72	March 14	Houston					Capital Centre	
73	March 16	New York					Capital Centre	
74	March 18	@ San Antonio					HemisFair Arena	
75	March 19	@ Atlanta	L 93–109				The Omni; 10,140	34–41
76	March 20	Philadelphia	W 119–113 (OT)	Ballard (30)	Hayes (13)	Porter (11)	Capital Centre; 17,649	35–41
77	March 22	@ New York					Madison Square Garden	
78	March 23	Detroit					Capital Centre	
79	March 25	Boston	L 95–96	Ballard (28)	Ballard (11)	Porter (15)	Capital Centre; 19,035	37–42
80	March 27	@ Cleveland					Richfield Coliseum	
81	March 28	Atlanta	W 100–80				Capital Centre; 18,186	38–43
82	March 30	@ New Jersey					Rutgers Athletic Center	

1979–80 schedule

== Playoffs ==
1980 playoff game log
Eastern Conference First Round: 0–2 (home: 0–1; road: 0–1)

Game	Date	Team	Score	High points	High rebounds	High assists	Location Attendance	Series
1	April 2	@ Philadelphia	L 96–111	Grevey (34)	Unseld (18)	Porter (7)	The Spectrum; 12,567	0–1
2	April 4	Philadelphia	L 104–112	Hayes (26)	Hayes (12)	Grevey (5)	Capital Centre; 18,397	0–2

1980 schedule

== Player statistics ==
Legend
GP	Games played	GS	Games started	MPG	Minutes per game
FG%	Field-goal percentage	3P%	3-point field-goal percentage	FT%	Free-throw percentage
RPG	Rebounds per game	APG	Assists per game	SPG	Steals per game
BPG	Blocks per game	PPG	Points per game

=== Season ===
Player	GP	GS	MPG	FG%	3FG%	FT%	RPG	APG	SPG	BPG	PPG
Gus Bailey											
Greg Ballard											
Ron Behagen											
Lawrence Boston											
Phil Chenier											
Jim Cleamons											
Dave Corzine											
Bob Dandridge											
Kevin Grevey											
Elvin Hayes											
Mitch Kupchak											
Steve Malovic											
Roger Phegley											
Kevin Porter											
Wes Unseld											
John Williamson											
Larry Wright											

=== Playoffs ===
Player	GP	GS	MPG	FG%	3FG%	FT%	RPG	APG	SPG	BPG	PPG
Greg Ballard											
Ron Behagen											
Jim Cleamons											
Dave Corzine											
Elvin Hayes											
Kevin Porter											
Wes Unseld											
John Williamson											
Larry Wright											

== See also ==
- 1979-80 NBA season
