= 1979–80 Houston Rockets season =

- Head coach: Del Harris
- General manager: Ray Patterson
- Owner: George J. Maloof Sr.
- Arena: The Summit

Results
- Record: 41–41 (.500)
- Place: Division: 2nd (Central); Conference: 4th (Eastern)
- Playoff finish: East Conference semifinals (lost to Celtics 0–4)
- Stats at Basketball Reference

Local media
- Television: KHTV
- Radio: KTRH

The 1979–80 Houston Rockets season was the Rockets' 13th season in the NBA and 9th season in the city of Houston.

In the playoffs, the Rockets defeated the San Antonio Spurs in three games in the First Round, before being swept by the Boston Celtics in four games in the Semifinals.

== Draft picks ==
Round	Pick	Player	Position	Nationality	College/Club team
1	17	Lee Johnson		United States	East Texas State
2	42	Paul Mokeski		United States	Kansas
3	59	Ricardo Brown		United States	Pepperdine
4	76	Sam Drummer		United States	Georgia Tech
4	80	Lionel Green		United States	LSU
5	104	Allen Leavell		United States	Oklahoma City
6	124	Collie Davis		United States	Southern
7	143	Rich Valavicius		United States	Auburn
8	161	Delbert Watson		United States	East Tennessee State

== Roster ==
1979–80 Houston Rockets roster
Players

Pos.	No.	Player	Height	Weight	DOB	From
F	4	Rick Barry	6 ft 7 in (2.01 m)	205 lb (93 kg)		Miami (FL)
F	22	Alonzo Bradley	6 ft 6 in (1.98 m)	190 lb (86 kg)		Texas Southern
G	10	Mike Dunleavy	6 ft 1 in (1.85 m)	180 lb (82 kg)		South Carolina
G	6	Tom Henderson	6 ft 3 in (1.91 m)	190 lb (86 kg)		Hawaiʻi
F	11	Major Jones	6 ft 9 in (2.06 m)	225 lb (102 kg)		Albany State
G	30	Allen Leavell	6 ft 1 in (1.85 m)	170 lb (77 kg)		Oklahoma City
C	24	Moses Malone	6 ft 11 in (2.11 m)	235 lb (107 kg)		Petersburg High School
C	54	Paul Mokeski	7 ft 0 in (2.13 m)	250 lb (113 kg)		Kansas
G	23	Calvin Murphy	5 ft 9 in (1.75 m)	165 lb (75 kg)		Niagara
C	5	Billy Paultz	6 ft 11 in (2.11 m)	235 lb (107 kg)		St. John's
F	50	Robert Reid	6 ft 8 in (2.03 m)	205 lb (93 kg)		Saint Mary's
F	45	Rudy Tomjanovich	6 ft 8 in (2.03 m)	218 lb (99 kg)		Michigan

Coaches
Head coach
- Del Harris
Assistant(s)
- Scotty Robertson

Legend
- (DP) Unsigned draft pick
- (FA) Free agent
- (S) Suspended
- Injured

== Regular season ==
=== Season standings ===
Central Division	W	L	PCT	GB	Home	Road	Div
y-Atlanta Hawks	50	32	.610	–	32–9	18–23	21–9
x-Houston Rockets	41	41	.500	9	29–12	12–29	20–10
x-San Antonio Spurs	41	41	.500	9	27–14	14–27	14–16
Cleveland Cavaliers	37	45	.451	13	28–13	9–32	16–14
Indiana Pacers	37	45	.451	13	26–15	11–30	15–15
Detroit Pistons	16	66	.195	34	13–28	3–38	4–26

#	Eastern Conference				
#	Team	W	L	PCT	GB
1	z-Boston Celtics	61	21	.744	–
2	y-Atlanta Hawks	50	32	.610	11
3	x-Philadelphia 76ers	59	23	.720	2
4	x-Houston Rockets	41	41	.500	20
5	x-San Antonio Spurs	41	41	.500	20
6	x-Washington Bullets	39	43	.476	22
7	New York Knicks	39	43	.476	22
8	Cleveland Cavaliers	37	45	.451	24
8	Indiana Pacers	37	45	.451	24
10	New Jersey Nets	34	48	.415	27
11	Detroit Pistons	16	66	.195	44

z – clinched division title
y – clinched division title
x – clinched playoff spot

== Game log ==
=== Regular season ===
1979–80 game log
Total: 41–41 (home: 29–12; road: 12–29)
October: 2–7 (home: 2–1; road: 0–6)

Game	Date	Team	Score	High points	High rebounds	High assists	Location Attendance	Record
1	October 12, 1979	@ Boston	L 106–114				Boston Garden	0–1
2	October 13, 1979; 7:05 p.m. CDT	@ Philadelphia	L 105–113	Malone (20)	Jones (10)	Dunleavy (8)	The Spectrum; 13,503	0–2
3	October 16, 1979	@ New York	L 121–126				Madison Square Garden	0–3
4	October 17, 1979	Indiana	W 116–112				The Summit	1–3
5	October 20, 1979	Atlanta	W 107–102				The Summit	2–3
6	October 24, 1979	Boston	L 99–100				The Summit	2–4
7	October 28, 1979	@ New Jersey	L 115–120				Rutgers Athletic Center	2–5
8	October 30, 1979	@ Cleveland	L 112–124				Richfield Coliseum	2–6
9	October 31, 1979	@ Indiana	L 129–133 (OT)				Market Square Arena	2–7

November: 10–4 (home: 7–1; road: 3–3)

Game	Date	Team	Score	High points	High rebounds	High assists	Location Attendance	Record
10	November 3, 1979	@ Detroit	W 114–111				Pontiac Silverdome	3–7
11	November 7, 1979	New Jersey	W 106–101				The Summit	4–7
12	November 10, 1979	Detroit	W 112–104				The Summit	5–7
13	November 13, 1979	@ Chicago	W 128–127				Chicago Stadium	6–7
14	November 14, 1979	Golden State	W 133–92				The Summit	7–7
15	November 16, 1979	New York	W 133–130				The Summit	8–7
16	November 17, 1979	@ Atlanta	W 102–100				The Omni	9–7
17	November 20, 1979	@ New York	L 125–130 (OT)				Madison Square Garden	9–8
18	November 21, 1979; 8:05 p.m. CST	Philadelphia	W 97–94	Murphy (26)	Malone (17)	Henderson, Leavell (4)	The Summit; 15,203	10–8
19	November 23, 1979; 7:05 p.m. CST	@ Philadelphia	L 102–113	Malone (17)	Malone (11)	Reid (6)	The Spectrum; 12,608	10–9
20	November 24, 1979	Washington	L 103–105				The Summit	10–10
21	November 27, 1979	@ Kansas City	L 115–117				Municipal Auditorium	10–11
22	November 28, 1979	Cleveland	W 113–111 (OT)				The Summit	11–11
23	November 30, 1979	Atlanta	W 106–95				The Summit	12–11

December: 5–9 (home: 4–2; road: 1–7)

Game	Date	Team	Score	High points	High rebounds	High assists	Location Attendance	Record
24	December 1, 1979	Portland	W 120–112 (OT)				The Summit	13–11
25	December 5, 1979; 8:05 p.m. CST	Los Angeles	L 114–116	Malone (32)	Malone (15)	Barry (8)	The Summit; 15,676	13–12
26	December 7, 1979	Detroit	W 124–109				The Summit	14–12
27	December 8, 1979	@ San Antonio	L 129–138				HemisFair Arena	14–13
28	December 12, 1979	@ San Diego	W 118–107				San Diego Sports Arena	15–13
29	December 13, 1979	@ Phoenix	L 113–121				Arizona Veterans Memorial Coliseum	15–14
30	December 14, 1979	@ Seattle	L 101–109				Kingdome	15–15
31	December 16, 1979	@ Portland	L 101–123				Memorial Coliseum	15–16
32	December 19, 1979	Chicago	L 102–108				The Summit	15–17
33	December 21, 1979<r>7:05 p.m. CST	@ Philadelphia	L 106–117	Murphy (37)	Malone (12)	Henderson (8)	The Spectrum; 6,649	15–18
34	December 22, 1979	@ Washington	L 114–122				Capital Centre	15–19
35	December 26, 1979	San Antonio	W 143–110				The Summit	16–19
36	December 27, 1979	@ Atlanta	L 110–112				The Omni	16–20
37	December 29, 1979; 8:05 p.m. CST	Philadelphia	W 104–100	Murphy (33)	Malone (17)	Henderson (9)	The Summit; 14,635	17–20

January: 8–8 (home: 6–4; road: 2–4)

Game	Date	Team	Score	High points	High rebounds	High assists	Location Attendance	Record
38	January 2, 1980	Boston	L 103–111				The Summit	17–21
39	January 4, 1980	@ New Jersey	L 101–104				Rutgers Athletic Center	17–22
40	January 5, 1980	Phoenix	W 111–110				The Summit	18–22
41	January 8, 1980	@ Cleveland	W 118–115 (OT)				Richfield Coliseum	19–22
42	January 9, 1980	Denver	W 114–112				The Summit	20–22
43	January 12, 1980	Cleveland	W 112–96				The Summit	21–22
44	January 13, 1980	@ Milwaukee	W 121–117				MECCA Arena	22–22
45	January 16, 1980	New Jersey	L 112–122				The Summit	22–23
46	January 18, 1980	Washington	W 134–111				The Summit	22–24
47	January 19, 1980	@ Detroit	L 110–122				Pontiac Silverdome	22–25
48	January 22, 1980	@ Boston	L 106–112				Boston Garden	23–25
49	January 23, 1980	San Diego	W 111–110 (2OT)				The Summit	24–25
50	January 26, 1980	Seattle	W 123–111				The Summit	25–25
51	January 29, 1980	@ Indiana	L 112–133				Market Square Arena	25–26
52	January 30, 1980	San Antonio	L 111–118				The Summit	25–27
53	January 31, 1980; 8:05 p.m. CST	Philadelphia	L 105–110	Malone (36)	Malone (19)	Henderson (6)	The Summit; 12,539	25–28

February: 8–5 (home: 6–1; road: 2–4)

Game	Date	Team	Score	High points	High rebounds	High assists	Location Attendance	Record
All-Star Break
54	February 6, 1980	New Jersey	W 115–114				The Summit	26–28
55	February 8, 1980	Cleveland	W 105–104				The Summit	27–28
56	February 9, 1980	Utah	W 117–95				The Summit	28–28
57	February 12, 1980	@ San Antonio	W 120–118				HemisFair Arena	29–28
58	February 13, 1980	New York	W 122–117				The Summit	30–28
59	February 15, 1980	Milwaukee	L 103–114				The Summit	30–29
60	February 17, 1980	@ Denver	L 99–112				McNichols Sports Arena	30–30
61	February 20, 1980	@ Golden State	L 102–115				Oakland-Alameda County Coliseum Arena	30–31
62	February 22, 1980	@ Utah	W 94–82				Salt Palace	31–31
63	February 24, 1980; 4:00 p.m. CST	@ Los Angeles	L 100–112	Malone (29)	Malone (17)	Paultz (6)	The Forum; 15,889	31–32
64	February 26, 1980	Indiana	W 93–88				The Summit	32–32
65	February 27, 1980	Washington	W 110–97				The Summit	33–32
66	February 28, 1980	@ Washington	L 99–105				Capital Centre	33–33

March: 8–8 (home: 4–3; road: 4–5)

Game	Date	Team	Score	High points	High rebounds	High assists	Location Attendance	Record
67	March 2, 1980	Kansas City	L 91–94				The Summit	34–33
68	March 4, 1980	@ Atlanta	W 93–83				The Omni	34–34
69	March 5, 1980	Boston	L 99–103 (OT)				The Summit	34–35
70	March 7, 1980	@ New Jersey	W 111–110 (2OT)				Rutgers Athletic Center	35–35
71	March 8, 1980	Atlanta	L 79–97				The Summit	35–36
72	March 11, 1980	@ New York	L 109–129				Madison Square Garden	35–37
73	March 12, 1980	@ Boston	L 105–121				Boston Garden	35–38
74	March 14, 1980	@ Washington	L 85–92				Capital Centre	35–39
75	March 16, 1980	@ Detroit	W 102–99				Pontiac Silverdome	36–39
76	March 19, 1980	New York	W 139–113				The Summit	37–39
77	March 20, 1980	@ Cleveland	L 96–109				Richfield Coliseum	37–40
78	March 22, 1980	Indiana	W 125–110				The Summit	39–39
79	March 25, 1980	@ San Antonio	L 107–126				HemisFair Arena	38–41
80	March 26, 1980	San Antonio	W 113–101				The Summit	39–41
81	March 28, 1980	Detroit	W 128–112				The Summit	40–41
82	March 30, 1980	@ Indiana	W 121–106				Market Square Arena	41–41

1979–80 schedule

=== Playoffs ===
1980 playoff game log
First Round: 2–1 (home: 2–0; road: 0–1)

Game	Date	Team	Score	High points	High rebounds	High assists	Location Attendance	Series
1	April 2, 1980	San Antonio	W 95–85	Calvin Murphy (28)	Moses Malone (14)	Tom Henderson (8)	The Summit; 14,454	1–0
2	April 4, 1980	@ San Antonio	L 101–106	Moses Malone (34)	Moses Malone (19)	Tom Henderson (10)	HemisFair Arena; 12,894	1–1
3	April 6, 1980	San Antonio	W 141–120	Moses Malone (37)	Moses Malone (20)	Tom Henderson (10)	The Summit; 15,676	2–1

Conference semifinals: 0–4 (home: 0–2; road: 0–2)

Game	Date	Team	Score	High points	High rebounds	High assists	Location Attendance	Series
1	April 9, 1980	@ Boston	L 101–119	Moses Malone (27)	Moses Malone (13)	three players tied (4)	Boston Garden; 15,320	0–1
2	April 11, 1980	@ Boston	L 75–95	Robert Reid (22)	Robert Reid (14)	Robert Reid (4)	Boston Garden; 15,320	0–2
3	April 13, 1980	Boston	L 81–100	Moses Malone (28)	Moses Malone (9)	Henderson, Leavell (5)	The Summit; 14,243	0–3
4	April 14, 1980	Boston	L 121–138	Moses Malone (28)	Moses Malone (15)	Reid, Leavell (8)	The Summit; 13,106	0–4

1980 schedule

== Player statistics ==
Legend
GP	Games played	GS	Games started	MPG	Minutes per game
FG%	Field-goal percentage	3P%	3-point field-goal percentage	FT%	Free-throw percentage
RPG	Rebounds per game	APG	Assists per game	SPG	Steals per game
BPG	Blocks per game	PPG	Points per game

=== Season ===
Player	GP	GS	MPG	FG%	3FG%	FT%	RPG	APG	SPG	BPG	PPG

=== Playoffs ===
Player	GP	GS	MPG	FG%	3FG%	FT%	RPG	APG	SPG	BPG	PPG

== Awards and records ==
- Moses Malone, All-NBA Second Team
