= Dan Roundfield =

American basketball player (1953–2012)

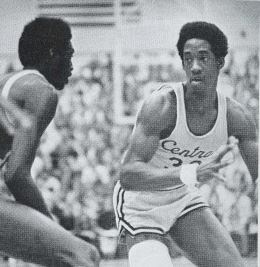
- Roundfield as a senior at Central Michigan

Personal information
- Born: May 26, 1953 Detroit, Michigan, U.S.
- Died: August 6, 2012 (aged 59) San Nicolas Zuid, Aruba
- Listed height: 6 ft 8 in (2.03 m)
- Listed weight: 205 lb (93 kg)

Career information
- High school: Chadsey (Detroit, Michigan)
- College: Central Michigan (1972–1975)
- NBA draft: 1975: 2nd round, 28th overall pick
- Drafted by: Cleveland Cavaliers
- Playing career: 1975–1988
- Position: Power forward
- Number: 32, 5

Career history
- 1975–1978: Indiana Pacers
- 1978–1984: Atlanta Hawks
- 1984–1985: Detroit Pistons
- 1985–1987: Washington Bullets
- 1987–1988: Auxilium Torino

Career highlights
- 3× NBA All-Star (1980–1982); All-NBA Second Team (1980); 3× NBA All-Defensive First Team (1980, 1982, 1983); 2× NBA All-Defensive Second Team (1981, 1984); MAC Player of the Year (1975); 2× First-team All-MAC (1974, 1975); No. 32 retired by Central Michigan Chippewas

Career ABA and NBA statistics
- Points: 11,657 (14.3 ppg)
- Rebounds: 7,502 (9.2 rpg)
- Blocks: 1,160 (1.4 bpg)
- Stats at NBA.com
- Stats at Basketball Reference

Danny Thomas Roundfield (May 26, 1953 – August 6, 2012) was an American professional basketball player. The 6 ft 8 in (2.03 m) power forward/center graduated from Detroit's Chadsey Senior High School in 1971. On the collegiate scene, Roundfield was twice selected to the All-Mid-American Conference Team for Central Michigan University; he was also the 1975 MAC Player of the Year.

Roundfield spent 12 seasons in the American Basketball Association and National Basketball Association, playing for the Indiana Pacers (1975–1978), Atlanta Hawks (1978–1984), Detroit Pistons (1984–1985) and Washington Bullets (1985–1987). He then moved to Turin, Italy, and played a season for Auxilium Torino.

Roundfield earned a reputation as a strong rebounder and tenacious defender, and during his career he was named to five NBA All-Defensive teams and three All-Star teams. His nickname was Dr. Rounds.

== Professional career ==
Roundfield was selected in the second round of the 1975 NBA draft by the Cleveland Cavaliers, but opted to play for the Indiana Pacers in the last season of the ABA. After an undistinguished rookie season, Roundfield was suddenly pressed into duty as starting power forward and jumped center in his second season because the Pacers had traded away Mel Daniels, and Tom Owens went to the Houston Rockets. He was signed by the Atlanta Hawks as a free agent before the 1978–79 season; the Pacers received the Hawks' first-round pick as compensation, which they used to select Dudley Bradley.

On November 21, 1978, Roundfield scored a career best 38 points, along with grabbing 10 rebounds, in a 113–107 win over the San Diego Clippers. In the 1979 NBA playoffs, Roundfield led the Hawks to a first round win over the Rockets while averaging 18 points, 15 rebounds and 3.5 blocks a game. However, in the following round, the Hawks were eliminated by the defending champion Washington Bullets in a tough seven-game series. Roundfield was selected to the NBA Eastern Conference All-Star team in three consecutive seasons from 1980 to 1982. He made the most of his 1980 All-Star appearance debut, scoring 18 points and grabbing 13 rebounds in 27 minutes coming off the bench. He came close to winning the game's MVP award for his performance, but was overshadowed by fellow Detroit product George Gervin's 34-point output. In the 1982 NBA Playoffs, Roundfield scored a career playoff high 29 points, in a deciding Game 2 loss to the Philadelphia 76ers in a best-of-three first-round series.

On June 18, 1984, Roundfield was traded by the Hawks to the Detroit Pistons for Antoine Carr, Cliff Levingston, a 1986 second-round draft pick, and a 1987 second-round draft pick. A year later, he was traded by the Pistons to the Washington Bullets for Rick Mahorn and Mike Gibson. After a season playing for Auxilium Torino in Italy, Roundfield retired in 1988.

== NBA career statistics ==
Legend
GP	Games played	GS	Games started	MPG	Minutes per game
FG%	Field goal percentage	3P%	3-point field goal percentage	FT%	Free throw percentage
RPG	Rebounds per game	APG	Assists per game	SPG	Steals per game
BPG	Blocks per game	PPG	Points per game	**Bold**	Career high

=== Regular season ===
Year	Team	GP	GS	MPG	FG%	3P%	FT%	RPG	APG	SPG	BPG	PPG
1975–76	Indiana (ABA)	67	–	11.4	.424	.000	.631	3.9	0.5	0.5	0.6	5.1
1976–77	Indiana	61	–	27.0	.466	–	.686	8.5	1.1	1.0	2.1	13.9
1977–78	Indiana	79	–	30.7	.489	–	.727	10.2	2.5	1.0	1.9	13.4
1978–79	Atlanta	80	–	31.7	.504	–	.714	10.8	1.6	1.1	**2.2**	15.3
1979–80	Atlanta	81	–	32.0	.499	.000	.710	10.3	2.3	**1.2**	1.7	16.5
1980–81	Atlanta	63	–	33.8	**.527**	.000	.721	10.1	2.6	**1.2**	1.9	17.6
1981–82	Atlanta	61	58	36.3	.466	**.200**	.760	**11.8**	2.7	1.0	1.5	18.6
1982–83	Atlanta	**77**	**76**	**36.5**	.470	.185	.749	11.4	**2.9**	0.8	1.5	**19.0**
1983–84	Atlanta	73	72	35.8	.485	.000	.770	9.9	2.5	0.8	1.0	18.9
1984–85	Detroit	56	43	26.6	.467	.000	.781	8.1	1.8	0.5	1.0	10.9
1985–86	Washington	79	21	29.4	.488	.000	.754	8.1	1.8	0.5	0.6	11.6
1986–87	Washington	36	0	18.6	.409	**.200**	**.792**	4.7	1.1	0.3	0.4	6.6
Career		813	270	29.7	.482	.111	.735	9.2	2.0	0.9	1.4	14.3
All-Star		1	0	27.0	.467	–	.444	13.0	0.0	1.0	2.0	18.0

=== Playoffs ===
Year	Team	GP	GS	MPG	FG%	3P%	FT%	RPG	APG	SPG	BPG	PPG
1976	Indiana (ABA)	2	–	12.5	**.583**	–	.889	5.0	0.0	1.0	2.0	11.0
1979	Atlanta (NBA)	**9**	–	37.6	.459	–	.800	11.8	2.8	0.9	**2.6**	17.6
1980	Atlanta (NBA)	5	–	34.8	.464	.000	.629	11.6	2.2	0.8	1.6	17.2
1982	Atlanta (NBA)	2	–	**42.5**	.472	–	.571	11.0	1.0	1.0	2.0	**21.0**
1983	Atlanta (NBA)	3	–	41.3	.480	.000	.455	**14.0**	**3.3**	**1.3**	1.3	17.7
1984	Atlanta (NBA)	5	–	38.2	.435	**1.000**	.714	8.8	1.7	0.4	1.4	17.2
1985	Detroit (NBA)	**9**	**8**	23.9	.485	–	**.941**	6.7	1.7	0.4	0.7	9.1
1986	Washington (NBA)	5	0	35.4	.528	.000	.824	9.2	2.0	0.4	0.8	14.0
Career		40	8	33.2	.473	.250	.732	9.7	2.0	0.7	1.5	15.0

== Personal life ==
Roundfield lived in Atlanta, where he worked for Camp Dresser & McKee Inc.

Roundfield died at Baby Beach in San Nicolas Zuid, Aruba in August 2012, drowning after helping his wife, Bernadine, to safety.
