= 1979–80 Cleveland Cavaliers season =

NBA professional basketball team season

- Head coach: Stan Albeck
- Owners: Nick Mileti
- Arena: Coliseum at Richfield

Results
- Record: 37–45 (.451)
- Place: Division: 4th (Central); Conference: 8th (Eastern)
- Playoff finish: Did not qualify
- Stats at Basketball Reference

Local media
- Television: WJKW
- Radio: WWWE

The 1979-80 Cleveland Cavaliers season was the tenth season of the franchise in the National Basketball Association (NBA).

== Draft picks ==
Round	Pick	Player	Nationality	School/Club team

== Roster ==
1979–80 Cleveland Cavaliers roster
Players

Pos.	No.	Player	Height	Weight	DOB	From
SG	34	Austin Carr	6 ft 4 in (1.93 m)	200 lb (91 kg)		Notre Dame
F	2	Kenny Carr	6 ft 7 in (2.01 m)	220 lb (100 kg)		NC State
F	35	Don Ford	6 ft 9 in (2.06 m)	215 lb (98 kg)		UC Santa Barbara
PF	24	John Lambert	6 ft 10 in (2.08 m)	225 lb (102 kg)		USC
F	30	Mike Mitchell	6 ft 7 in (2.01 m)	215 lb (98 kg)		Auburn
F/C	25	Dave Robisch	6 ft 10 in (2.08 m)	235 lb (107 kg)		Kansas
SF	21	Campy Russell (injured)	6 ft 8 in (2.03 m)	215 lb (98 kg)		Michigan
C	3	Elmore Smith (injured) (IN)	7 ft 0 in (2.13 m)	250 lb (113 kg)		Kentucky State
G	9	Randy Smith	6 ft 3 in (1.91 m)	185 lb (84 kg)		Buffalo State
G	11	Willie Smith	6 ft 1 in (1.85 m)	170 lb (77 kg)		Missouri
G/F	43	Earl Tatum	6 ft 5 in (1.96 m)	185 lb (84 kg)		Marquette
PG	14	Foots Walker	6 ft 0 in (1.83 m)	184 lb (83 kg)		West Georgia
F	33	Bill Willoughby	6 ft 8 in (2.03 m)	205 lb (93 kg)		Dwight Morrow HS (NJ)

Coaches
Head coach
- Stan Albeck
Assistant(s)
- Morris McHone

Legend
- (DP) Unsigned draft pick
- (FA) Free agent
- (S) Suspended
- Injured

== Regular season ==
=== Season standings ===
Central Division	W	L	PCT	GB	Home	Road	Div
y-Atlanta Hawks	50	32	.610	–	32–9	18–23	21–9
x-Houston Rockets	41	41	.500	9	29–12	12–29	20–10
x-San Antonio Spurs	41	41	.500	9	27–14	14–27	14–16
Cleveland Cavaliers	37	45	.451	13	28–13	9–32	16–14
Indiana Pacers	37	45	.451	13	26–15	11–30	15–15
Detroit Pistons	16	66	.195	34	13–28	3–38	4–26

#	Eastern Conference				
#	Team	W	L	PCT	GB
1	z-Boston Celtics	61	21	.744	–
2	y-Atlanta Hawks	50	32	.610	11
3	x-Philadelphia 76ers	59	23	.720	2
4	x-Houston Rockets	41	41	.500	20
5	x-San Antonio Spurs	41	41	.500	20
6	x-Washington Bullets	39	43	.476	22
7	New York Knicks	39	43	.476	22
8	Cleveland Cavaliers	37	45	.451	24
8	Indiana Pacers	37	45	.451	24
10	New Jersey Nets	34	48	.415	27
11	Detroit Pistons	16	66	.195	44

== Game log ==
1979–80 game log
Total: 37–45 (Home: 28–13; Road: 9–32)
October: 3–8 (home: 3–3; road: 0–5)

Game	Date	Team	Score	High points	High rebounds	High assists	Location Attendance	Record
7	October 23, 1979	Atlanta	L 111–121				Coliseum at Richfield; 3,946	2–5
8	October 24, 1979	@ Atlanta	L 118–128				The Omni; 5,729	2–6

November: 8–7 (home: 6–0; road: 2–7)

Game	Date	Team	Score	High points	High rebounds	High assists	Location Attendance	Record

December: 8–5 (home: 7–1; road: 1–4)

Game	Date	Team	Score	High points	High rebounds	High assists	Location Attendance	Record
28	December 2, 1979	Atlanta	W 126–108				Coliseum at Richfield; 4,844	12–16

January: 4–12 (home: 3–4; road: 1–8)

Game	Date	Team	Score	High points	High rebounds	High assists	Location Attendance	Record
44	January 9, 1980	@ Atlanta	L 107–111				The Omni; 7,589	19–25

February: 3–10 (home: 2–4; road: 1–6)

Game	Date	Team	Score	High points	High rebounds	High assists	Location Attendance	Record
68	February 29, 1980	@ Atlanta	L 103–111 (OT)				The Omni; 11,655	26–42

March: 11–3 (home: 7–1; road: 4–2)

Game	Date	Team	Score	High points	High rebounds	High assists	Location Attendance	Record
82	March 30, 1980	Atlanta	W 111–102				Coliseum at Richfield; 7,762	37–45

1979–80 schedule

== Player stats ==
Note: GP= Games played; GS = Games started; MIN= Minutes; FG% = field goal %, FT% = free throw %, 3FG% = 3 point % STL= Steals; BLK = Blocks; AST = Assists; REB = Rebounds; PTS = Points

Regular Season

Playoffs

== Awards and records ==
=== Awards ===
- Austin Carr, J. Walter Kennedy Citizenship Award
