= 1979–80 Atlanta Hawks season =

NBA professional basketball team season

- Division champions
- Head coach: Hubie Brown
- Arena: Omni Coliseum

Results
- Record: 50–32 (.610)
- Place: Division: 1st (Central); Conference: 2nd (Eastern)
- Playoff finish: East Conference Semifinals (Eliminated 1-4)
- Stats at Basketball Reference

Local media
- Television: WTBS; SuperStation WTBS
- Radio: WSB

The 1979–80 Atlanta Hawks season was the Hawks' 31st season in the NBA and 12th season in Atlanta.

== Roster ==
1979–80 Atlanta Hawks roster
Players

Pos.	No.	Player	Height	Weight	DOB	From
F	50	John Brown	6 ft 7 in (2.01 m)	220 lb (100 kg)		Missouri
G	14	Charlie Criss	5 ft 8 in (1.73 m)	165 lb (75 kg)		New Mexico State
G	22	John Drew	6 ft 6 in (1.98 m)	205 lb (93 kg)		Gardner–Webb
F	21	Jack Givens	6 ft 5 in (1.96 m)	205 lb (93 kg)		Kentucky
C	10	Steve Hawes	6 ft 9 in (2.06 m)	220 lb (100 kg)		Washington
G	24	Armond Hill	6 ft 4 in (1.93 m)	190 lb (86 kg)		Princeton
G	3	Eddie Johnson	6 ft 2 in (1.88 m)	180 lb (82 kg)		Auburn
G	33	Jim McElroy	6 ft 3 in (1.91 m)	190 lb (86 kg)		Central Michigan
C	54	Tom McMillen (injured)	6 ft 11 in (2.11 m)	215 lb (98 kg)		Maryland
F	41	Sam Pellom	6 ft 9 in (2.06 m)	225 lb (102 kg)		Buffalo
C	30	Tree Rollins	7 ft 1 in (2.16 m)	235 lb (107 kg)		Clemson
F	32	Dan Roundfield	6 ft 8 in (2.03 m)	205 lb (93 kg)		Central Michigan

Coaches
Head coach
- Hubie Brown
Assistant(s)
- Mike Fratello

Legend
- (DP) Unsigned draft pick
- (FA) Free agent
- (S) Suspended
- Injured

== Regular season ==
=== Season standings ===
Central Division	W	L	PCT	GB	Home	Road	Div
y-Atlanta Hawks	50	32	.610	–	32–9	18–23	21–9
x-Houston Rockets	41	41	.500	9	29–12	12–29	20–10
x-San Antonio Spurs	41	41	.500	9	27–14	14–27	14–16
Cleveland Cavaliers	37	45	.451	13	28–13	9–32	16–14
Indiana Pacers	37	45	.451	13	26–15	11–30	15–15
Detroit Pistons	16	66	.195	34	13–28	3–38	4–26

#	Eastern Conference				
#	Team	W	L	PCT	GB
1	z-Boston Celtics	61	21	.744	–
2	y-Atlanta Hawks	50	32	.610	11
3	x-Philadelphia 76ers	59	23	.720	2
4	x-Houston Rockets	41	41	.500	20
5	x-San Antonio Spurs	41	41	.500	20
6	x-Washington Bullets	39	43	.476	22
7	New York Knicks	39	43	.476	22
8	Cleveland Cavaliers	37	45	.451	24
8	Indiana Pacers	37	45	.451	24
10	New Jersey Nets	34	48	.415	27
11	Detroit Pistons	16	66	.195	44

z - clinched division title
y - clinched division title
x - clinched playoff spot

== Playoffs ==
1980 playoff game log
Conference Semifinals: 1–4 (home: 1–1; road: 0–3)

Game	Date	Team	Score	High points	High rebounds	High assists	Location Attendance	Series
1	April 6	@ Philadelphia	L 104–107	Eddie Johnson (26)	Dan Roundfield (13)	Eddie Johnson (6)	Spectrum; 10,561	0–1
2	April 9	@ Philadelphia	L 92–99	Dan Roundfield (23)	Dan Roundfield (14)	three players tied (3)	Spectrum; 18,276	0–2
3	April 10	Philadelphia	W 105–93	Eddie Johnson (19)	Tree Rollins (17)	three players tied (6)	Omni Coliseum; 15,617	1–2
4	April 13	Philadelphia	L 83–107	Dan Roundfield (17)	Dan Roundfield (12)	three players tied (4)	Omni Coliseum; 15,617	1–3
5	April 15	@ Philadelphia	L 100–105	John Drew (29)	Dan Roundfield (13)	Charlie Criss (5)	Spectrum; 18,276	1–4

1980 schedule

== Player statistics ==
Legend
GP	Games played	GS	Games started	MPG	Minutes per game
FG%	Field-goal percentage	3P%	3-point field-goal percentage	FT%	Free-throw percentage
RPG	Rebounds per game	APG	Assists per game	SPG	Steals per game
BPG	Blocks per game	PPG	Points per game

=== Season ===
Player	GP	GS%" | FG%	3FG%	FT%	RPG	APG	SPG	BPG	PPG

=== Playoffs ===
Player	GP	GS	MPG	FG%	3FG%	FT%	RPG	APG	SPG	BPG	PPG

== Awards and records ==
- Dan Roundfield, All-NBA Second Team
- Dan Roundfield, NBA All-Defensive First Team
- "Fast Eddie" Johnson, NBA All-Defensive Second Team

== See also ==
- 1979-80 NBA season
