= 1979–80 Boston Celtics season =

NBA basketball team season

- Division champions
- Head coach: Bill Fitch
- General manager: Red Auerbach
- Owner: Harry T. Mangurian Jr.
- Arena: Boston Garden; Hartford Civic Center

Results
- Record: 61–21 (.744)
- Place: Division: 1st (Atlantic); Conference: 1st (Eastern)
- Playoff finish: Eastern Conference finals (lost to 76ers 1–4)
- Stats at Basketball Reference

Local media
- Television: WBZ-TV
- Radio: WBZ

The 1979–80 Boston Celtics season was the 34th season of the Boston Celtics in the National Basketball Association (NBA). Bolstered by the play of 23-year-old rookie Larry Bird, the Celtics improved from 29–53 the previous year, to 61–21, at the time the best NBA single season turnaround ever, and would cruise to the Eastern Conference finals but lose to the Philadelphia 76ers 4–1.

== Draft picks ==
Round	Pick	Player	Position	Nationality	College
3	53	Wayne Kreklow	SG	United States	Drake
3	61	Ernesto Malcolm	SG	Panama	Briar Cliff
4	68	Nick Galis	SG	United States	Seton Hall
5	90	Jimmy Allen		United States	New Haven
7	130	Steve Castellan	PF	United States	Virginia
8	149	Glenn Sudhop	C	United States	NC State
9	168	Kevin Sinnett		United States	Navy
10	186	Alton Byrd	PG	United States	Columbia

- Forward Larry Bird was selected in the previous year's draft, then played his senior season at Indiana State

== Roster ==
1979–80 Boston Celtics roster
Players

Pos.	No.	Player	Height	Weight	DOB	From
G	7	Nate Archibald	6 ft 1 in (1.85 m)	150 lb (68 kg)	1948–09–02	UTEP
F	33	Larry Bird	6 ft 9 in (2.06 m)	220 lb (100 kg)	1956–12–07	Indiana State
F	30	M. L. Carr	6 ft 6 in (1.98 m)	205 lb (93 kg)	1951–01–09	Guilford
G	12	Don Chaney	6 ft 5 in (1.96 m)	210 lb (95 kg)	1946–03–22	Houston
F/C	18	Dave Cowens	6 ft 9 in (2.06 m)	230 lb (104 kg)	1948–10–25	Florida State
F/C	45	Eric Fernsten	6 ft 10 in (2.08 m)	205 lb (93 kg)	1953–11–01	San Francisco
G	42	Chris Ford	6 ft 5 in (1.96 m)	190 lb (86 kg)	1949–01–11	Villanova
G	43	Gerald Henderson	6 ft 2 in (1.88 m)	175 lb (79 kg)	1956–01–16	VCU
F	32	Jeff Judkins	6 ft 6 in (1.98 m)	185 lb (84 kg)	1956–03–23	Utah
G	44	Pete Maravich	6 ft 5 in (1.96 m)	197 lb (89 kg)	1947–06–22	LSU
F	31	Cedric Maxwell	6 ft 8 in (2.03 m)	205 lb (93 kg)	1955–11–21	Charlotte
C	53	Rick Robey	6 ft 11 in (2.11 m)	230 lb (104 kg)	1956–01–30	Kentucky

Coaches
Head coach
- Bill Fitch
Assistant(s)
- K. C. Jones
- Jimmy Rodgers

Legend
- (DP) Unsigned draft pick
- (FA) Free agent
- (S) Suspended
- Injured

Roster
Updated: January 22, 1980

== Regular season ==
=== Season standings ===
Atlantic Division	W	L	PCT	GB	Home	Road	Div
y-Boston Celtics	61	21	.744	–	35–6	26–15	17–7
x-Philadelphia 76ers	59	23	.720	2	36–5	23–18	19–5
x-Washington Bullets	39	43	.476	22	24–17	15–26	9–15
New York Knicks	39	43	.476	22	25–16	14–27	8–16
New Jersey Nets	34	48	.415	27	22–19	12–29	7–17

#	Eastern Conference				
#	Team	W	L	PCT	GB
1	z-Boston Celtics	61	21	.744	–
2	y-Atlanta Hawks	50	32	.610	11
3	x-Philadelphia 76ers	59	23	.720	2
4	x-Houston Rockets	41	41	.500	20
5	x-San Antonio Spurs	41	41	.500	20
6	x-Washington Bullets	39	43	.476	22
7	New York Knicks	39	43	.476	22
8	Cleveland Cavaliers	37	45	.451	24
8	Indiana Pacers	37	45	.451	24
10	New Jersey Nets	34	48	.415	27
11	Detroit Pistons	16	66	.195	44

== Game log ==
=== Regular season ===
1979–80 game log
Total: 61–21 (home: 35–6; road: 26–15)
October: 7–2 (home: 3–0; road: 4–2)

Game	Date	Team	Score	High points	High rebounds	High assists	Location Attendance	Record
1	October 12	Houston	W 114–106				Boston Garden	1–0
2	October 13	@ Cleveland	W 139–117				Richfield Coliseum	2–0
3	October 17	Cleveland	W 127–108				Boston Garden	3–0
4	October 19	Washington	W 130–93				Boston Garden	4–0
5	October 20	@ Indiana	L 128–131 (OT)				Market Square Arena	4–1
6	October 23	@ San Antonio	L 120–129				HemisFair Arena	4–2
7	October 24	@ Houston	W 100–99				The Summit	5–2
8	October 27	@ Atlanta	W 100–95				The Omni	6–2
9	October 31	@ New Jersey	W 116–79				Rutgers Athletic Center	7–2

November: 10–2 (home: 8–0; road: 2–2)

Game	Date	Team	Score	High points	High rebounds	High assists	Location Attendance	Record
10	November 3	@ Washington	W 118–97				Capital Centre	8–2
11	November 7	San Antonio	W 117–105				Boston Garden	9–2
12	November 9	Kansas City	W 127–119				Boston Garden	10–2
13	November 10	@ Philadelphia	L 94–95				The Spectrum	10–3
14	November 14	Detroit	W 115–111				Boston Garden	11–3
15	November 16	Utah	W 113–97				Boston Garden	12–3
16	November 17	@ New York	L 109–113				Madison Square Garden	12–4
17	November 21	New Jersey	W 111–103				Boston Garden	13–4
18	November 23	Indiana	W 118–103				Boston Garden	14–4
19	November 24	@ Atlanta	W 106–101				The Omni	15–4
20	November 28	Denver	W 119–97				Boston Garden	16–4
21	November 30	New York	W 100–97				Boston Garden	17–4

December: 12–5 (home: 5–1; road: 7–4)

Game	Date	Team	Score	High points	High rebounds	High assists	Location Attendance	Record
22	December 1	@ Indiana	W 106–102 (OT)				Market Square Arena	18–4
23	December 2	@ Kansas City	L 88–94				Municipal Auditorium	18–5
24	December 4	@ Detroit	W 118–114 (OT)				Pontiac Silverdome	19–5
25	December 5	Atlanta	L 92–120				Boston Garden	19–6
26	December 7	Phoenix	W 100–92				Boston Garden	20–6
27	December 8	@ Cleveland	L 100–116				Richfield Coliseum	20–7
28	December 9	@ Milwaukee	W 113–108				MECCA Arena	21–7
29	December 12	New Jersey	W 116–102				Boston Garden	22–7
30	December 14	Milwaukee	W 97–94				Boston Garden	23–7
31	December 15	@ New York	W 99–96				Madison Square Garden	24–7
32	December 16	@ New Jersey	W 115–112 (OT)				Rutgers Athletic Center	25–7
33	December 19	Philadelphia	W 112–89				Boston Garden	26–7
34	December 21	San Antonio	W 133–114				Boston Garden	27–7
35	December 22	@ Philadelphia	L 113–126				The Spectrum	27–8
36	December 27	@ San Diego	W 118–97				San Diego Sports Arena	28–8
37	December 28	@ Los Angeles	L 105–123				The Forum	28–9
38	December 29	@ Golden State	W 104–88				Oakland–Alameda County Coliseum Arena	29–9

January: 11–4 (home: 7–3; road: 4–1)

Game	Date	Team	Score	High points	High rebounds	High assists	Location Attendance	Record
39	January 2	@ Houston	W 111–103				The Summit	30–9
40	January 5	@ San Antonio	L 111–119				HemisFair Arena	30–10
41	January 9	New York	W 112–95				Boston Garden	31–10
42	January 11	Atlanta	W 108–93				Boston Garden	32–10
43	January 13	Los Angeles	L 98–100				Boston Garden	32–11
44	January 16	Chicago	W 114–104				Boston Garden	33–11
45	January 18	Portland	W 111–93				Boston Garden	34–11
46	January 20	Seattle	L 106–108 (2OT)				Boston Garden	34–12
47	January 22	Houston	W 112–106				Boston Garden	35–12
48	January 23	@ Detroit	W 131–104				Pontiac Silverdome	36–12
49	January 25	Washington	L 107–118				Boston Garden	36–13
50	January 27	San Diego	W 131–108				Boston Garden	37–13
51	January 29	@ Chicago	W 103–99				Chicago Stadium	38–13
52	January 30	Cleveland	W 110–103				Boston Garden	39–13
53	January 31	@ Washington	W 119–103				Capital Centre	40–13

February: 9–2 (home: 6–0; road: 3–2)

Game	Date	Team	Score	High points	High rebounds	High assists	Location Attendance	Record
54	February 6	Philadelphia	W 129–110				Boston Garden	41–13
55	February 8	Indiana	W 130–108				Boston Garden	42–13
56	February 10	Detroit	W 128–111				Boston Garden	43–13
57	February 13	@ Phoenix	L 134–135				Arizona Veterans Memorial Coliseum	43–14
58	February 15	@ Portland	W 106–91				Memorial Coliseum	44–14
59	February 17	@ Seattle	L 108–109				Kingdome	44–15
60	February 20	@ Utah	W 105–98				Salt Palace	45–15
61	February 23	@ Denver	W 124–105				McNichols Sports Arena	46–15
62	February 26	Atlanta	W 108–97				Hartford Civic Center	47–15
63	February 27	San Antonio	W 130–125				Boston Garden	48–15
64	February 29	Golden State	W 110–99				Boston Garden	49–15

March: 12–6 (home: 6–2; road: 6–4)

Game	Date	Team	Score	High points	High rebounds	High assists	Location Attendance	Record
65	March 2	Detroit	W 118–115				Boston Garden	50–15
66	March 4	@ San Antonio	W 137–108				HemisFair Arena	51–15
67	March 5	@ Houston	W 103–99 (OT)				The Summit	52–15
68	March 7	Philadelphia	W 111–92				Boston Garden	53–15
69	March 9	Washington	L 128–133 (OT)				Boston Garden	53–16
70	March 11	@ Indiana	L 108–114				Market Square Arena	53–17
71	March 12	Houston	W 121–105				Boston Garden	54–17
72	March 14	@ Atlanta	L 87–88				The Omni	54–18
73	March 15	@ New York	W 123–120				Madison Square Garden	55–18
74	March 17	@ New Jersey	W 117–92				Rutgers Athletic Center	56–18
75	March 18	Indiana	W 114–102				Hartford Civic Center	57–18
76	March 20	@ Detroit	W 124–106				Pontiac Silverdome	58–18
77	March 22	@ Cleveland	L 105–109				Richfield Coliseum	58–19
78	March 23	New Jersey	L 96–101				Boston Garden	58–20
79	March 25	@ Washington	W 96–95				Capital Centre	59–20
80	March 26	New York	W 129–121				Boston Garden	60–20
81	March 28	Cleveland	W 130–122				Boston Garden	61–20
82	March 30	@ Philadelphia	L 110–116				The Spectrum	61–21

1979–80 schedule

=== Playoffs ===
1980 playoff game log
Conference semifinals: 4–0 (home: 2–0; road: 2–0)

Game	Date	Team	Score	High points	High rebounds	High assists	Location Attendance	Series
1	April 9	Houston	W 119–101	Chris Ford (19)	Cedric Maxwell (12)	Tiny Archibald (9)	Boston Garden; 15,320	1–0
2	April 11	Houston	W 95–75	Larry Bird (14)	Cedric Maxwell (10)	Tiny Archibald (7)	Boston Garden; 15,320	2–0
3	April 13	@ Houston	W 100–81	Tiny Archibald (20)	Cedric Maxwell (12)	Tiny Archibald (10)	The Summit; 14,243	3–0
4	April 14	@ Houston	W 138–121	Larry Bird (34)	Larry Bird (10)	Tiny Archibald (10)	The Summit; 13,106	4–0

Conference finals: 1–4 (home: 1–2; road: 0–2)

Game	Date	Team	Score	High points	High rebounds	High assists	Location Attendance	Series
1	April 18	Philadelphia	L 93–96	Larry Bird (27)	Dave Cowens (10)	Tiny Archibald (7)	Boston Garden; 15,320	0–1
2	April 20	Philadelphia	W 96–90	Larry Bird (31)	Cedric Maxwell (15)	Tiny Archibald (8)	Boston Garden; 15,320	1–1
3	April 23	@ Philadelphia	L 97–99	Larry Bird (22)	Larry Bird (21)	Tiny Archibald (7)	Spectrum; 18,276	1–2
4	April 25	@ Philadelphia	L 90–102	Larry Bird (19)	Larry Bird (13)	Gerald Henderson (6)	Spectrum; 18,276	1–3
5	April 27	Philadelphia	L 94–105	Archibald, Cowens (22)	Larry Bird (14)	Tiny Archibald (9)	Boston Garden; 15,320	1–4

1980 schedule

== See also ==
- 1979–80 NBA season
