= 1979–80 San Antonio Spurs season =

- Head coach: Doug Moe (fired); Bob Bass (interim)
- General manager: Bob Bass
- Owner: Angelo Drossos
- Arena: HemisFair Arena

Results
- Record: 41–41 (.500)
- Place: Division: 3rd (Central); Conference: 5th (Eastern)
- Playoff finish: First round (lost to Rockets 1–2)
- Stats at Basketball Reference

Local media
- Television: KMOL-TV
- Radio: WOAI

The 1979–80 San Antonio Spurs season was the Spurs' fourth season in the NBA, the 7th in San Antonio, and the 13th season as a franchise.

== Draft picks ==
Round	Pick	Player	Position	Nationality	College
1	19	Wiley Peck	SG	United States	Mississippi State
3	63	Sylvester Norris		United States	Jackson State
4	84	Al Daniel		United States	Furman
5	106	Steve Schall		United States	Arkansas
6	125	Terry Knight		United States	Pittsburgh
7	146	Tyrone Branyan		United States	Texas
8	182	Eddie McLeod		United States	Nevada-Las Vegas
10	199	Glen Fine		United States	Harvard

== Roster ==
1979–80 San Antonio Spurs roster
Players

Pos.	No.	Player	Height	Weight	DOB	From
PF	21	Tim Bassett	6 ft 8 in (2.03 m)	225 lb (102 kg)	––	Georgia
SG	1	Mike Evans	6 ft 1 in (1.85 m)	170 lb (77 kg)	––	Kansas State
PG	12	Mike Gale	6 ft 4 in (1.93 m)	185 lb (84 kg)	––	Elizabeth City State
G/F	44	George Gervin	6 ft 7 in (2.01 m)	180 lb (82 kg)	––	Eastern Michigan
C	30	Paul Griffin	6 ft 9 in (2.06 m)	205 lb (93 kg)	––	Western Michigan
PF	35	Larry Kenon	6 ft 9 in (2.06 m)	205 lb (93 kg)	––	Memphis
C	40	Sylvester Norris	6 ft 11 in (2.11 m)	220 lb (100 kg)	––	Jackson State
SF	53	Mark Olberding	6 ft 8 in (2.03 m)	225 lb (102 kg)	––	Minnesota
SF	54	Wiley Peck	6 ft 7 in (2.01 m)	220 lb (100 kg)	––	Mississippi State
SF	31	Kevin Restani	6 ft 9 in (2.06 m)	225 lb (102 kg)	––	San Francisco
PF	34	John Shumate	6 ft 9 in (2.06 m)	235 lb (107 kg)	––	Notre Dame
PG	13	James Silas	6 ft 1 in (1.85 m)	180 lb (82 kg)	––	Stephen F. Austin

Coaches
Head coach
- Bob Bass
Assistant(s)
- George Karl

Legend
- (DP) Unsigned draft pick
- (FA) Free agent
- (S) Suspended
- Injured

Roster
Updated: March 22, 1980

== Regular season ==
=== Season standings ===
Central Division	W	L	PCT	GB	Home	Road	Div
y-Atlanta Hawks	50	32	.610	–	32–9	18–23	21–9
x-Houston Rockets	41	41	.500	9	29–12	12–29	20–10
x-San Antonio Spurs	41	41	.500	9	27–14	14–27	14–16
Cleveland Cavaliers	37	45	.451	13	28–13	9–32	16–14
Indiana Pacers	37	45	.451	13	26–15	11–30	15–15
Detroit Pistons	16	66	.195	34	13–28	3–38	4–26

#	Eastern Conference				
#	Team	W	L	PCT	GB
1	z-Boston Celtics	61	21	.744	–
2	y-Atlanta Hawks	50	32	.610	11
3	x-Philadelphia 76ers	59	23	.720	2
4	x-Houston Rockets	41	41	.500	20
5	x-San Antonio Spurs	41	41	.500	20
6	x-Washington Bullets	39	43	.476	22
7	New York Knicks	39	43	.476	22
8	Cleveland Cavaliers	37	45	.451	24
8	Indiana Pacers	37	45	.451	24
10	New Jersey Nets	34	48	.415	27
11	Detroit Pistons	16	66	.195	44

z - clinched division title
y - clinched division title
x - clinched playoff spot

== Playoffs ==
1980 playoff game log
First Round: 1–2 (home: 1–0; road: 0–2)

Game	Date	Team	Score	High points	High rebounds	High assists	Location Attendance	Series
1	April 2	@ Houston	L 85–95	George Gervin (19)	Gervin, Kenon (9)	Gervin, Olberding (4)	The Summit; 14,454	0–1
2	April 4	Houston	W 106–101	George Gervin (44)	Mark Olberding (12)	Mike Gale (9)	HemisFair Arena; 12,894	1–1
3	April 6	@ Houston	L 120–141	George Gervin (37)	John Shumate (8)	George Gervin (6)	The Summit; 15,676	1–2

1980 schedule

== Player statistics ==
=== Ragular season ===
Player	POS	GP	GS	MP	REB	AST	STL	BLK	PTS	MPG	RPG	APG	SPG	BPG	PPG
Kevin Restani	SF	82		1,966	386	189	54	12	874	24.0	4.7	2.3	.7	.1	10.7
Paul Griffin	C	82		1,812	438	250	81	53	520	22.1	5.3	3.0	1.0	.6	6.3
Mike Evans	SG	79		1,246	107	230	60	9	486	15.8	1.4	2.9	.8	.1	6.2
George Gervin	SG	78		2,934	403	202	110	79	2,585	37.6	5.2	2.6	1.4	1.0	33.1
Larry Kenon	PF	78		2,798	775	231	111	18	1,565	35.9	9.9	3.0	1.4	.2	20.1
James Silas	PG	77		2,293	167	347	61	14	1,365	29.8	2.2	4.5	.8	.2	17.7
Mark Olberding	SF	75		2,111	418	327	67	22	792	28.1	5.6	4.4	.9	.3	10.6
Mike Gale	PG	67		1,474	152	312	123	13	441	22.0	2.3	4.7	1.8	.2	6.6
Wiley Peck	SF	52		628	183	33	17	23	180	12.1	3.5	.6	.3	.4	3.5
Billy Paultz^{†}	C	47		1,213	321	118	47	45	444	25.8	6.8	2.5	1.0	1.0	9.4
John Shumate^{†}	PF	27		777	214	52	23	31	391	28.8	7.9	1.9	.9	1.1	14.5
Irv Kiffin	SF	26		212	40	19	10	2	82	8.2	1.5	.7	.4	.1	3.2
Sylvester Norris	C	17		189	43	6	3	12	40	11.1	2.5	.4	.2	.7	2.4
Tim Bassett^{†}	PF	5		72	15	10	3	0	10	14.4	3.0	2.0	.6	.0	2.0
Harry Davis	SF	4		30	6	0	1	0	13	7.5	1.5	.0	.3	.0	3.3

- ^{†} Denotes player spent time with another team in the season. Stats reflect time with the Spurs only.

=== Playoffs ===
Player	POS	GP	GS	MP	REB	AST	STL	BLK	PTS	MPG	RPG	APG	SPG	BPG	PPG
George Gervin	SG	3		122	20	12	5	3	100	40.7	6.7	4.0	1.7	1.0	33.3
Mark Olberding	SF	3		97	22	11	2	1	29	32.3	7.3	3.7	.7	.3	9.7
James Silas	PG	3		90	7	9	6	1	43	30.0	2.3	3.0	2.0	.3	14.3
Larry Kenon	PF	3		81	13	4	0	0	26	27.0	4.3	1.3	.0	.0	8.7
John Shumate	PF	3		78	13	5	4	4	21	26.0	4.3	1.7	1.3	1.3	7.0
Kevin Restani	SF	3		74	16	3	0	1	38	24.7	5.3	1.0	.0	.3	12.7
Mike Gale	PG	3		69	6	16	5	0	21	23.0	2.0	5.3	1.7	.0	7.0
Paul Griffin	C	3		69	15	6	0	1	20	23.0	5.0	2.0	.0	.3	6.7
Tim Bassett	PF	3		19	1	0	0	0	2	6.3	.3	.0	.0	.0	.7
Mike Evans	SG	2		12	2	2	0	0	11	6.0	1.0	1.0	.0	.0	5.5
Wiley Peck	SF	2		9	3	0	0	1	0	4.5	1.5	.0	.0	.5	.0

== Awards and records ==
- George Gervin, All-NBA First Team

== See also ==
- 1979-80 NBA season
