= 1979–80 New York Knicks season =

Season of National Basketball Association team the New York Knicks

- Head coach: Red Holzman
- General manager: Eddie Donovan
- Arena: Madison Square Garden

Results
- Record: 39–43 (.476)
- Place: Division: 4th (Atlantic); Conference: 7th (Eastern)
- Playoff finish: Did not qualify
- Stats at Basketball Reference

Local media
- Television: WOR-TV
- Radio: WNEW

The 1979–80 New York Knicks season was the 34th season for the team in the National Basketball Association (NBA). In the regular season, the Knicks finished in a tie for third place in the Atlantic Division with a 39–43 win–loss record, and did not qualify for the 1980 NBA Playoffs. Bill Cartwright led the team in scoring (21.7 points per game) and rebounding, while Micheal Ray Richardson led the NBA in assists (10.2 per game) and steals (3.23 per game).

New York had three first-round picks in the 1979 NBA draft, and selected Cartwright, Larry Demic, and Sly Williams. At the end of the season, the Knicks lost five of their last six games; they followed a three-game losing streak with a win against the Cleveland Cavaliers, but then lost to the Boston Celtics and Philadelphia 76ers. In the game against the 76ers, Julius Erving made the winning basket with one second remaining, after the Knicks had committed a turnover on an inbounds pass five seconds earlier with the score tied at 101–101. The Washington Bullets gained the last playoff berth in the Eastern Conference over the Knicks because of a better record against other teams in the conference; the teams' overall win–loss records were identical. The 1979–80 Knicks were the first team in NBA history to feature a roster made up entirely of black players, which led to racially charged nicknames for the team.

== Roster ==
1979–80 New York Knicks roster
Players

Pos.	No.	Player	Height	Weight	DOB	From
C	25	Bill Cartwright	7 ft 1 in (2.16 m)	245 lb (111 kg)	1957-07-30	San Francisco
F	45	Hollis Copeland	6 ft 6 in (1.98 m)	180 lb (82 kg)	1955-12-20	Rutgers
F	42	Larry Demic	6 ft 9 in (2.06 m)	225 lb (102 kg)	1957-06-27	Arizona
G	34	Mike Glenn	6 ft 2 in (1.88 m)	175 lb (79 kg)	1955-09-10	Southern Illinois
G	23	Geoff Huston	6 ft 2 in (1.88 m)	175 lb (79 kg)	1957-11-08	Texas Tech
F	43	Toby Knight	6 ft 9 in (2.06 m)	210 lb (95 kg)	1955-05-03	Notre Dame
C	50	Joe C. Meriweather	6 ft 10 in (2.08 m)	215 lb (98 kg)	1953-10-26	Southern Illinois
G	15	Earl Monroe	6 ft 3 in (1.91 m)	185 lb (84 kg)	1944-11-21	Winston-Salem State
G	20	Michael Ray Richardson	6 ft 5 in (1.96 m)	189 lb (86 kg)	1955-04-11	Montana
C	40	Marvin Webster	7 ft 1 in (2.16 m)	225 lb (102 kg)	1952-04-13	Morgan State
G	13	Ray Williams	6 ft 3 in (1.91 m)	188 lb (85 kg)	1954-10-14	Minnesota

Coaches
Head coach
- Red Holzman

Legend
- (DP) Unsigned draft pick
- (FA) Free agent
- (S) Suspended
- Injured

Roster

== Regular season ==
=== Season standings ===
Atlantic Division	W	L	PCT	GB	Home	Road	Div
y-Boston Celtics	61	21	.744	–	35–6	26–15	17–7
x-Philadelphia 76ers	59	23	.720	2	36–5	23–18	19–5
x-Washington Bullets	39	43	.476	22	24–17	15–26	9–15
New York Knicks	39	43	.476	22	25–16	14–27	8–16
New Jersey Nets	34	48	.415	27	22–19	12–29	7–17

#	Eastern Conference				
#	Team	W	L	PCT	GB
1	z-Boston Celtics	61	21	.744	–
2	y-Atlanta Hawks	50	32	.610	11
3	x-Philadelphia 76ers	59	23	.720	2
4	x-Houston Rockets	41	41	.500	20
5	x-San Antonio Spurs	41	41	.500	20
6	x-Washington Bullets	39	43	.476	22
7	New York Knicks	39	43	.476	22
8	Cleveland Cavaliers	37	45	.451	24
8	Indiana Pacers	37	45	.451	24
10	New Jersey Nets	34	48	.415	27
11	Detroit Pistons	16	66	.195	44

z – clinched division title
y – clinched division title
x – clinched playoff spot

== Game log ==
=== Regular season ===
1979–80 game log
Total: 39–43 (Home: 25–16; Road: 14–27)
October: 5–5 (home: 4–1; road: 1–4)

Game	Date	Team	Score	High points	High rebounds	High assists	Location Attendance	Record

November : 6–8 (home: 4–3; road: 2–5)

Game	Date	Team	Score	High points	High rebounds	High assists	Location Attendance	Record

December : 8–8 (home: 5–3; road: 3–5)

Game	Date	Team	Score	High points	High rebounds	High assists	Location Attendance	Record

January : 8–7 (home: 4–3; road: 4–4)

Game	Date	Team	Score	High points	High rebounds	High assists	Location Attendance	Record

February : 5–5 (home: 4–2; road: 1–3)

Game	Date	Team	Score	High points	High rebounds	High assists	Location Attendance	Record

March : 7–10 (home: 4–4; road: 3–6)

Game	Date	Team	Score	High points	High rebounds	High assists	Location Attendance	Record

1979–80 schedule

== Player statistics ==
Legend
GP	Games played	GS	Games started	MPG	Minutes per game
FG%	Field-goal percentage	3P%	3-point field-goal percentage	FT%	Free-throw percentage
RPG	Rebounds per game	APG	Assists per game	SPG	Steals per game
BPG	Blocks per game	PPG	Points per game

== Awards and records ==
- Bill Cartwright, NBA All-Rookie Team 1st Team
