= 1979–80 NBA season =

34th NBA season

- League: National Basketball Association
- Sport: Basketball
- Duration: October 12, 1979 – March 30, 1980; April 2 – 30, 1980 (Playoffs); May 4 – 16, 1980 (Finals)
- Games: 82
- Teams: 22
- TV partner(s): CBS, USA

Draft
- Top draft pick: Magic Johnson
- Picked by: Los Angeles Lakers

Regular season
- Top seed: Boston Celtics
- Season MVP: Kareem Abdul-Jabbar (Los Angeles)
- Top scorer: George Gervin (San Antonio)

Playoffs
- Eastern champions: Philadelphia 76ers
- Eastern runners-up: Boston Celtics
- Western champions: Los Angeles Lakers
- Western runners-up: Seattle SuperSonics

Finals
- Champions: Los Angeles Lakers
- Runners-up: Philadelphia 76ers
- Finals MVP: Magic Johnson (Los Angeles)

NBA seasons
- ← 1978–79 1980–81 →

The 1979–80 NBA season was the 34th season of the National Basketball Association. The season ended with the Los Angeles Lakers winning the NBA championship, beating the Philadelphia 76ers 4 games to 2 in the NBA Finals, and is notable for being the year in which the three-point field goal was adopted.

== Notable occurrences ==
- An unbalanced schedule is adopted. Teams play each of the other 10 teams within their own conference six times, and the 11 teams from the opposite conference twice each.
- The NBA officially adopts the three-point field goal. Boston Celtics guard Chris Ford made the first three-pointer on October 12, 1979, against the Houston Rockets.
- The number of officials is reduced from three to two following a one-season experiment with three-man officiating crews. The three-official system will be re-adopted permanently for the 1988–89 season.
- The Jazz relocate from New Orleans, Louisiana, to Salt Lake City, Utah, and move from the Central Division to the Midwest Division (with the Indiana Pacers replacing them).
- The Kansas City Kings are forced to play most of the season at the Municipal Auditorium after the roof at Kemper Arena collapses due to high wind on June 4, 1979. The Kings played the 1972–73 and 1973–74 seasons at Municipal Auditorium while splitting their home schedule between Kansas City and Omaha.
- Jerry Buss purchases the Los Angeles Lakers franchise from Jack Kent Cooke prior to the season.
- The 1980 NBA All-Star Game was played at the Capital Centre in Landover, Maryland, with the East defeating the West 144–136 in overtime. George Gervin of the San Antonio Spurs wins the game's MVP award.
- This was the first season the NBA had a cable television partner. The USA Network signed a three-year, 1.5 million dollar deal.
- This was both Magic Johnson’s and Larry Bird’s rookie seasons and is considered to be the birth of the modern game.
- Darryl Dawkins broke two backboards: one at Kansas City's Municipal Auditorium on November 13, 1979, and a second backboard 23 days later at the Philadelphia Spectrum. Because his dunks resulted in delays while teams went to find another backboard, the NBA eventually modified their basketball rims to make them collapsible.
- Former NBA official and CBS analyst Mendy Rudolph died on July 4, 1979. All NBA referee shirts sport the No. 5 patch in his honor, and it was retired permanently.
- Finishing 16–66, the Detroit Pistons suffer the worst NBA record since the infamous 1972–73 76ers won only nine games. In between, no team had won fewer than 22 in a season, but expansion and the availability of more-skilled players from overseas made such poor records more common in subsequent seasons.
- It was the final season for future hall of famers Rick Barry, Walt Frazier, Earl Monroe and Pete Maravich. Boston Celtics center Dave Cowens also originally retired after the season, but came back a few years later to play for the Milwaukee Bucks.
- Kareem Abdul-Jabbar won MVP for the sixth time in his career, which remains the league's record-best.

Coaching changes
Offseason
Team	1978–79 coach	1979–80 coach
Boston Celtics	Dave Cowens	Bill Fitch
Chicago Bulls	Scotty Robertson	Jerry Sloan
Cleveland Cavaliers	Bill Fitch	Stan Albeck
Houston Rockets	Tom Nissalke	Del Harris
Los Angeles Lakers	Jerry West	Jack McKinney
New Orleans/Utah Jazz	Elgin Baylor	Tom Nissalke
In-season
Team	Outgoing coach	Incoming coach
Detroit Pistons	Dick Vitale	Richie Adubato
Golden State Warriors	Al Attles	Johnny Bach
San Antonio Spurs	Doug Moe	Bob Bass
Los Angeles Lakers	Jack McKinney	Paul Westhead

== Final standings ==
=== By division ===
Atlantic Division	W	L	PCT	GB	Home	Road	Div
y-Boston Celtics	61	21	.744	–	35–6	26–15	17–7
x-Philadelphia 76ers	59	23	.720	2	36–5	23–18	19–5
x-Washington Bullets	39	43	.476	22	24–17	15–26	9–15
New York Knicks	39	43	.476	22	25–16	14–27	8–16
New Jersey Nets	34	48	.415	27	22–19	12–29	7–17

Central Division	W	L	PCT	GB	Home	Road	Div
y-Atlanta Hawks	50	32	.610	–	32–9	18–23	21–9
x-Houston Rockets	41	41	.500	9	29–12	12–29	20–10
x-San Antonio Spurs	41	41	.500	9	27–14	14–27	14–16
Cleveland Cavaliers	37	45	.451	13	28–13	9–32	16–14
Indiana Pacers	37	45	.451	13	26–15	11–30	15–15
Detroit Pistons	16	66	.195	34	13–28	3–38	4–26

Midwest Division	W	L	PCT	GB	Home	Road	Div
y-Milwaukee Bucks	49	33	.598	–	28–12	21–21	15–9
x-Kansas City Kings	47	35	.573	2	30–11	17–24	18–6
Chicago Bulls	30	52	.366	19	21–20	9–32	8–16
Denver Nuggets	30	52	.366	19	24–17	6–35	10–14
Utah Jazz	24	58	.293	25	17–24	7–34	9–15

Pacific Division	W	L	PCT	GB	Home	Road	Div
y-Los Angeles Lakers	60	22	.732	–	37–4	23–18	19–11
x-Seattle SuperSonics	56	26	.683	4	33–8	23–18	18–12
x-Phoenix Suns	55	27	.671	5	37–5	18–22	19–11
x-Portland Trail Blazers	38	44	.463	22	26–15	12–29	13–17
San Diego Clippers	35	47	.427	25	24–17	11–30	13–17
Golden State Warriors	24	58	.293	36	15–26	9–32	8–22

=== By conference ===
#	Eastern Conference				
#	Team	W	L	PCT	GB
1	z-Boston Celtics	61	21	.744	–
2	y-Atlanta Hawks	50	32	.610	11
3	x-Philadelphia 76ers	59	23	.720	2
4	x-Houston Rockets	41	41	.500	20
5	x-San Antonio Spurs	41	41	.500	20
6	x-Washington Bullets	39	43	.476	22
7	New York Knicks	39	43	.476	22
8	Cleveland Cavaliers	37	45	.451	24
8	Indiana Pacers	37	45	.451	24
10	New Jersey Nets	34	48	.415	27
11	Detroit Pistons	16	66	.195	44

#	Western Conference				
#	Team	W	L	PCT	GB
1	c-Los Angeles Lakers	60	22	.732	–
2	y-Milwaukee Bucks	49	33	.598	11
3	x-Seattle SuperSonics	56	26	.683	4
4	x-Phoenix Suns	55	27	.671	5
5	x-Kansas City Kings	47	35	.573	13
6	x-Portland Trail Blazers	38	44	.463	22
7	San Diego Clippers	35	47	.427	25
8	Chicago Bulls	30	52	.366	30
9	Denver Nuggets	30	52	.366	30
10	Utah Jazz	24	58	.293	36
11	Golden State Warriors	24	58	.293	36

Notes

- z – Clinched home court advantage for the entire playoffs and first round bye
- c – Clinched home court advantage for the conference playoffs and first round bye
- y – Clinched division title and first round bye
- x – Clinched playoff spot

== Playoffs ==
Teams in bold advanced to the next round. The numbers to the left of each team indicate the team's seeding in its conference, and the numbers to the right indicate the number of games the team won in that round. The division champions are marked by an asterisk. Home court advantage does not necessarily belong to the higher-seeded team, but instead the team with the better regular season record; teams enjoying the home advantage are shown in italics.

First Round
E4	**Houston**	**2**
E5	San Antonio	1
E3	**Philadelphia**	**2**
E6	Washington	0
W4	**Phoenix**	**2**
W5	Kansas City	1
W3	**Seattle**	**2**
W6	Portland	1

Conference Semifinals
**E1**	**Boston***	**4**
E4	Houston	0
**Eastern Conference**
**E3**	**Philadelphia**	**4**
E2	Atlanta*	1
**W1**	**Los Angeles***	**4**
W4	Phoenix	1
**Western Conference**
**W3**	**Seattle**	**4**
W2	Milwaukee*	3

Conference Finals
E1	Boston*	1
**E3**	**Philadelphia**	**4**
**W1**	**Los Angeles***	**4**
W3	Seattle	1

NBA Finals
E3	Philadelphia	2
**W1**	**Los Angeles***	**4**

- * Division winner
- **Bold** Series winner
- Italic Team with home-court advantage

== Statistics leaders ==
Category	Player	Team	Stat
Points per game	George Gervin	San Antonio Spurs	33.1
Rebounds per game	Swen Nater	San Diego Clippers	15.0
Assists per game	Micheal Ray Richardson	New York Knicks	10.1
Steals per game	Micheal Ray Richardson	New York Knicks	3.23
Blocks per game	Kareem Abdul-Jabbar	Los Angeles Lakers	3.41
FG%	Cedric Maxwell	Boston Celtics	.609
FT%	Rick Barry	Houston Rockets	.935
3FG%	Fred Brown	Seattle SuperSonics	.443

== NBA awards ==
- Most Valuable Player: Kareem Abdul-Jabbar, Los Angeles Lakers
- Rookie of the Year: Larry Bird, Boston Celtics
- Coach of the Year: Bill Fitch, Boston Celtics

- All-NBA First Team:
  - G – Paul Westphal, Phoenix Suns
  - G – George Gervin, San Antonio Spurs
  - F – Julius Erving, Philadelphia 76ers
  - F – Larry Bird, Boston Celtics
  - C – Kareem Abdul-Jabbar, Los Angeles Lakers
- All-NBA Second Team:
  - F – Dan Roundfield, Atlanta Hawks
  - F – Marques Johnson, Milwaukee Bucks
  - C – Moses Malone, Houston Rockets
  - G – Dennis Johnson, Seattle SuperSonics
  - G – Gus Williams, Seattle SuperSonics

- All-NBA Rookie Team:
  - Larry Bird, Boston Celtics
  - Magic Johnson, Los Angeles Lakers
  - Bill Cartwright, New York Knicks
  - David Greenwood, Chicago Bulls
  - Calvin Natt, Portland Trail Blazers

- NBA All-Defensive First Team:
  - Bobby Jones, Philadelphia 76ers
  - Dan Roundfield, Atlanta Hawks
  - Kareem Abdul-Jabbar, Los Angeles Lakers
  - Dennis Johnson, Seattle SuperSonics
  - Don Buse, Phoenix Suns (tie)
  - Micheal Ray Richardson, New York Knicks (tie)
- NBA All-Defensive Second Team:
  - Scott Wedman, Kansas City Kings
  - Kermit Washington, Portland Trail Blazers
  - Dave Cowens, Boston Celtics
  - Quinn Buckner, Milwaukee Bucks
  - Eddie Johnson, Atlanta Hawks

=== Players of the week ===
Week	Player
Oct 12 – 21	Julius Erving (Philadelphia 76ers) (1/1)
Oct 22 – 28	Michael Ray Richardson (New York Knicks) (1/1)
Oct 29 – Nov 4	Marques Johnson (Milwaukee Bucks) (1/1)
Nov 5 – 11	Magic Johnson (Los Angeles Lakers) (1/2)
Nov 12 – 18	Phil Ford (Kansas City Kings) (1/1)
Nov 19 – 25	Walter Davis (Phoenix Suns) (1/1)
Nov 26 – Dec 2	Adrian Dantley (Utah Jazz) (1/1)
Dec 3 – 9	Kareem Abdul-Jabbar (Los Angeles Lakers) (1/2)
Dec 10 – 16	Dan Roundfield (Atlanta Hawks) (1/1)
Dec 17 – 23	Swen Nater (San Diego Clippers) (1/1)
Dec 24 – 30	Mike Mitchell (Cleveland Cavaliers) (1/1)
Dec 31 – Jan 6	Scott Wedman (Kansas City Kings) (1/1)
Jan 7 – 13	Greg Ballard (Washington Bullets) (1/1)
Jan 14 – 20	Dennis Johnson (Seattle SuperSonics) (1/1)
Jan 21 – 27	George Gervin (San Antonio Spurs) (1/1)
Feb 4 – 10	Rick Barry (Houston Rockets) (1/1)
Feb 11 – 17	Kareem Abdul-Jabbar (Los Angeles Lakers) (2/2)
Feb 18 – 24	Calvin Natt (New Jersey Nets) (1/1)
Feb 25 – Mar 3	Larry Bird (Boston Celtics) (1/1)
Mar 4 – 10	Cliff Robinson (New Jersey Nets) (1/1)
Mar 11 – 17	Magic Johnson (Los Angeles Lakers) (2/2)
Mar 18 – 24	Billy Ray Bates (Portland Trail Blazers) (1/1)
Mar 25 – 31	Kevin Grevey (Washington Bullets) (1/1)

=== Players of the month ===
Month	Player
November	Moses Malone (Houston Rockets) (1/1)
December	Kareem Abdul-Jabbar (Los Angeles Lakers) (1/1)
January	George Gervin (San Antonio Spurs) (1/1)
February	Larry Bird (Boston Celtics) (1/1)
March	Julius Erving (Philadelphia 76ers) (1/1)

== See also ==
- List of NBA regular season records
