= 1981 NBA playoffs =

Basketball competition

Tournament details
- Dates: March 31–May 14, 1981
- Season: 1980–81
- Teams: 12

Final positions
- Champions: Boston Celtics (14th title)
- Runners-up: Houston Rockets
- Semifinalists: Kansas City Kings; Philadelphia 76ers

Tournament statistics
- Scoring leader(s): Moses Malone (Rockets) (26.8 PPG)

Awards
- MVP: Cedric Maxwell (Celtics)

The 1981 NBA playoffs were the postseason tournament of the National Basketball Association's 1980–81 season. The tournament concluded with the Eastern Conference champion Boston Celtics defeating the Western Conference champion Houston Rockets 4 games to 2 in the NBA Finals. Cedric Maxwell was named NBA Finals MVP.

The playoffs are notable for being the third and final time to date that a team with a losing record advanced to the NBA Finals (the St. Louis Hawks did it first in 1957 with a 34–38 record, the Minneapolis Lakers did it in 1959 with a 33–39 record), as the Rockets won their first Western Conference title despite having a 40–42 record.

This was the only time in NBA history in which two teams with a losing record played each other in a Conference Finals, though the 1957 Western Division Finals did feature two teams with losing records. The Rockets and the Kansas City Kings, both with a 40–42 record, played in the Western Conference Finals which saw the Rockets prevail 4–1.

The Kings' playoff series victories over the Blazers and Suns were their last in Kansas City. Their last playoff series in Kansas City was a three-game sweep in the first round in 1984 by the Lakers. They moved to Sacramento after the 1984–85 season and did not win a playoff series representing northern California until 2001.

The Pacers became the last former ABA team to make their playoff debut, but were quickly swept by the 76ers 2–0.

This is the last year to date that an NBA playoff game was played in March.

The Celtics replicated their 1968 comeback by beating the Sixers in 7 after trailing 3–1. This was the only time a team came back from a 3–1 series deficit to win against the same team twice until the Detroit Pistons did so in 2026.

This was the last time the Los Angeles Lakers were not the number one seed in the Western Conference until 1991. It was also the only year in which the Lakers failed to win a playoff series with both Magic Johnson and Kareem Abdul-Jabbar on the team.

== Bracket ==
First Round
E4	New York	0
E5	Chicago	2
E3	Philadelphia	2
E6	Indiana	0
W4	Portland	1
W5	Kansas City	2
W3	Los Angeles	1
W6	Houston	2

Conference Semifinals
E1	Boston*	4
E5	Chicago	0
Eastern Conference
E3	Philadelphia	4
E2	Milwaukee*	3
W1	Phoenix*	3
W5	Kansas City	4
Western Conference
W6	Houston	4
W2	San Antonio*	3

Conference Finals
E1	Boston*	4
E3	Philadelphia	3
W5	Kansas City	1
W6	Houston	4

NBA Finals
E1	Boston*	4
W6	Houston	2

- * Division winner
- Bold Series winner
- Italic Team with home-court advantage

== First round ==
=== Eastern Conference first round ===
==== (3) Philadelphia 76ers vs. (6) Indiana Pacers ====
March 31

Boxscore

Indiana Pacers 108, Philadelphia 76ers 124
Scoring by quarter: 33–38, 16–29, 30–24, 29–33
Pts: Billy Knight 25; Rebs: Knight, C. Johnson 7 each Asts: Johnny Davis 8	Pts: Julius Erving 32; Rebs: Caldwell Jones 12; Asts: Andrew Toney 11
Philadelphia leads series, 1–0

Spectrum, Philadelphia, Pennsylvania
Attendance: 7,288
Referees: John Vanak, Lee Jones

April 2

Boxscore

Philadelphia 76ers 96, Indiana Pacers 85
Scoring by quarter: 27–23, 25–18, 18–24, 26–20
Pts: Julius Erving 23; Rebs: Caldwell Jones 11; Asts: Maurice Cheeks 6	Pts: Johnny Davis 21; Rebs: Clemon Johnson 13; Asts: Billy Knight 4
Philadelphia wins series, 2–0

Market Square Arena, Indianapolis, Indiana
Attendance: 8,921
Referees: Earl Strom, Jack Madden

Regular-season series
Philadelphia won 6–0 in the regular-season series

November 13, 1980

Recap

Philadelphia 76ers 130, Indiana Pacers 103

Market Square Arena, Indianapolis

November 21, 1980

Recap

Indiana Pacers 88, Philadelphia 76ers 97

Spectrum, Philadelphia

December 16, 1980

Recap

Philadelphia 76ers 109, Indiana Pacers 107

Market Square Arena, Indianapolis

January 21, 1981

Recap

Indiana Pacers 104, Philadelphia 76ers 118

Spectrum, Philadelphia

March 10, 1981

Recap

Philadelphia 76ers 103, Indiana Pacers 102

Market Square Arena, Indianapolis

March 18, 1981

Recap

Indiana Pacers 95, Philadelphia 76ers 107

Spectrum, Philadelphia

This was the first playoff meeting between the Pacers and the 76ers.

==== (4) New York Knicks vs. (5) Chicago Bulls ====
March 31

Boxscore

Chicago Bulls 90, New York Knicks 80
Scoring by quarter: 12–24, 23–16, 25–18, 30–22
Pts: Ricky Sobers 18; Rebs: Artis Gilmore 16; Asts: Ricky Sobers 6	Pts: Ray Williams 19; Rebs: Micheal Ray Richardson 13; Asts: Micheal Ray Richardson 6
Chicago leads series, 1–0

Madison Square Garden, New York City, New York
Attendance: 14,822

April 3

Boxscore

New York Knicks 114, Chicago Bulls 115 (OT)
Scoring by quarter: 36–32, 26–20, 25–28, 19–26, Overtime: 8–9
Pts: Campy Russell 29; Rebs: three players 6 each Asts: three players 5 each	Pts: Reggie Theus 37; Rebs: Dwight Jones 14; Asts: Reggie Theus 11
Chicago wins series, 2–0

Chicago Stadium, Chicago, Illinois
Attendance: 19,901

Regular-season series
Tied 3–3 in the regular-season series

October 21, 1980

Recap

Chicago Bulls 97, New York Knicks 105

Madison Square Garden, New York City

November 21, 1980

Recap

New York Knicks 121, Chicago Bulls 130

Chicago Stadium, Chicago, Illinois

December 23, 1980

Recap

New York Knicks 114, Chicago Bulls 117

Chicago Stadium, Chicago, Illinois

February 6, 1981

Recap

New York Knicks 112, Chicago Bulls 94

Chicago Stadium, Chicago, Illinois

February 28, 1981

Recap

Chicago Bulls 101, New York Knicks 97

Madison Square Garden, New York City

March 13, 1981

Recap

Chicago Bulls 117, New York Knicks 127

Madison Square Garden, New York City

This was the first playoff meeting between the Bulls and the Knicks.

=== Western Conference first round ===
==== (3) Los Angeles Lakers vs. (6) Houston Rockets ====
April 1

Boxscore

Houston Rockets 111, Los Angeles Lakers 107
Scoring by quarter: 32–26, 28–24, 29–31, 22–26
Pts: Moses Malone 38; Rebs: Moses Malone 23; Asts: Allen Leavell 8	Pts: Magic Johnson 26; Rebs: Kareem Abdul-Jabbar 15; Asts: Norm Nixon 10
Houston leads series, 1–0

The Forum, Inglewood, California
Attendance: 15,517

April 3

Boxscore

Los Angeles Lakers 111, Houston Rockets 106
Scoring by quarter: 27–18, 27–29, 30–23, 27–36
Pts: Kareem Abdul-Jabbar 27; Rebs: Magic Johnson 18; Asts: Norm Nixon 11	Pts: Moses Malone 33; Rebs: Moses Malone 15; Asts: Calvin Murphy 8
Series tied, 1–1

The Summit, Houston, Texas
Attendance: 16,121

April 5

Boxscore

Houston Rockets 89, Los Angeles Lakers 86
Scoring by quarter: 27–29, 22–18, 22–20, 18–19
Pts: Moses Malone 23; Rebs: Moses Malone 15; Asts: Tom Henderson 7	Pts: Kareem Abdul-Jabbar 32; Rebs: Kareem Abdul-Jabbar 18; Asts: Magic Johnson 9
Houston wins series, 2–1

The Forum, Inglewood, California
Attendance: 14,813

Regular-season series
Los Angeles won 3–2 in the regular-season series

October 12, 1980

Recap

Houston Rockets 103, Los Angeles Lakers 114

The Forum, Inglewood, California

November 12, 1980

Recap

Los Angeles Lakers 104, Houston Rockets 107

The Summit, Houston, Texas

December 10, 1980

Recap

Los Angeles Lakers 109, Houston Rockets 108

The Summit, Houston, Texas

February 13, 1981

Recap

Los Angeles Lakers 114, Houston Rockets 105

The Summit, Houston, Texas

February 20, 1981

Recap

Houston Rockets 110, Los Angeles Lakers 107

The Forum, Inglewood, California

This was the first playoff meeting between the Rockets and the Lakers.

==== (4) Portland Trail Blazers vs. (5) Kansas City Kings ====
April 1

Boxscore

Kansas City Kings 98, Portland Trail Blazers 97 (OT)
Scoring by quarter: 23–18, 26–30, 18–29, 23–13, Overtime: 8–7
Pts: Otis Birdsong 29; Rebs: King, Lacey 12 each Asts: Sam Lacey 10	Pts: Billy Ray Bates 25; Rebs: Kermit Washington 17; Asts: Kelvin Ransey 10
Kansas City leads series, 1–0

Memorial Coliseum, Portland, Oregon
Attendance: 12,666

April 3

Boxscore

Portland Trail Blazers 124, Kansas City Kings 119 (OT)
Scoring by quarter: 22–21, 33–31, 39–34, 18–26, Overtime: 12–7
Pts: Mychal Thompson 40; Rebs: Kermit Washington 18; Asts: Kelvin Ransey 7	Pts: Scott Wedman 31; Rebs: Sam Lacey 9 Asts: Sam Lacey 8
Series tied, 1–1

Kemper Arena, Kansas City, Missouri
Attendance: 11,088

April 5

Boxscore

Kansas City Kings 104, Portland Trail Blazers 95
Scoring by quarter: 22–29, 27–19, 25–20, 30–27
Pts: Reggie King 28; Rebs: Reggie King 15; Asts: Ernie Grunfeld 6	Pts: Billy Ray Bates 34; Rebs: Kermit Washington 17; Asts: Kelvin Ransey 8
Kansas City wins series, 2–1

Memorial Coliseum, Portland, Oregon
Attendance: 12,666

Regular-season series
Kansas City won 3–2 in the regular-season series

October 29, 1980

Recap

Portland Trail Blazers 98, Kansas City Kings 115

Kemper Arena, Kansas City, Missouri

November 11, 1980

Recap

Kansas City Kings 102, Portland Trail Blazers 101

Memorial Coliseum, Portland, Oregon

January 14, 1981

Recap

Portland Trail Blazers 110, Kansas City Kings 91

Kemper Arena, Kansas City, Missouri

February 8, 1981

Recap

Kansas City Kings 123, Portland Trail Blazers 129 (OT)

Memorial Coliseum, Portland, Oregon

March 5, 1981

Recap

Portland Trail Blazers 100, Kansas City Kings 106

Kemper Arena, Kansas City, Missouri

This was the first playoff meeting between the Trail Blazers and the Kings.

== Conference semifinals ==
=== Eastern Conference semifinals ===
==== (1) Boston Celtics vs. (5) Chicago Bulls ====
April 5

Boxscore

Chicago Bulls 109, Boston Celtics 121
Scoring by quarter: 23–32, 29–22, 29–40, 28–27
Pts: Dwight Jones 19; Rebs: Dwight Jones 9 Asts: Jones, Sobers 4 each	Pts: Larry Bird 23; Rebs: Larry Bird 12; Asts: Bird, Maxwell 5 each
Boston leads series, 1–0

Boston Garden, Boston, Massachusetts
Attendance: 15,320
Referees: Earl Strom, Jess Kersey

April 7

Boxscore

Chicago Bulls 97, Boston Celtics 106
Scoring by quarter: 14–32, 24–21, 28–23, 31–30
Pts: Reggie Theus 21; Rebs: Gilmore, Jones 10 each Asts: three players 4 each	Pts: Archibald, Parish 27 each Rebs: Larry Bird 12; Asts: Larry Bird 9
Boston leads series, 2–0

Boston Garden, Boston, Massachusetts
Attendance: 15,320
Referees: Darell Garretson, Hugh Evans

April 10

Boxscore

Boston Celtics 113, Chicago Bulls 107
Scoring by quarter: 32–35, 25–25, 30–25, 26–22
Pts: Larry Bird 24; Rebs: Larry Bird 17; Asts: Larry Bird 10	Pts: Reggie Theus 26; Rebs: David Greenwood 12; Asts: Reggie Theus 8
Boston leads series, 3–0

Chicago Stadium, Chicago, Illinois
Attendance: 19,995
Referees: Lee Jones, Paul Mihalak

April 12

Boxscore

Boston Celtics 109, Chicago Bulls 103
Scoring by quarter: 25–24, 30–29, 25–27, 29–23
Pts: Larry Bird 35; Rebs: Larry Bird 11; Asts: Tiny Archibald 6	Pts: David Greenwood 24; Rebs: Artis Gilmore 15; Asts: Theus, Sobers 7 each
Boston wins series, 4–0

Chicago Stadium, Chicago, Illinois
Attendance: 18,249
Referees: Darell Garretson, Wally Rooney, Ed Middleton (alternate)

Regular-season series
Boston won 5–1 in the regular-season series

November 9, 1980

Recap

Chicago Bulls 105, Boston Celtics 111

Hartford Civic Center, Hartford, Connecticut

November 18, 1980

Recap

Boston Celtics 113, Chicago Bulls 112

Chicago Stadium, Chicago, Illinois

December 13, 1980

Recap

Boston Celtics 106, Chicago Bulls 95

Chicago Stadium, Chicago, Illinois

December 17, 1980

Recap

Chicago Bulls 98, Boston Celtics 115

Boston Garden, Boston

January 9, 1981

Recap

Chicago Bulls 111, Boston Celtics 117 (OT)

Boston Garden, Boston

January 29, 1981

Recap

Boston Celtics 85, Chicago Bulls 108

Chicago Stadium, Chicago, Illinois

This was the first playoff meeting between the Celtics and the Bulls.

==== (2) Milwaukee Bucks vs. (3) Philadelphia 76ers ====
April 5

Boxscore

Milwaukee Bucks 122, Philadelphia 76ers 125
Scoring by quarter: 37–32, 26–34, 27–27, 32–32
Pts: Junior Bridgeman 32; Rebs: Marques Johnson 14; Asts: Quinn Buckner 8	Pts: Julius Erving 38; Rebs: Caldwell Jones 11; Asts: Caldwell Jones 7
Philadelphia leads series, 1–0

Spectrum, Philadelphia, Pennsylvania
Attendance: 9,727

April 7

Boxscore

Milwaukee Bucks 109, Philadelphia 76ers 99
Scoring by quarter: 21–25, 33–20, 23–32, 32–22
Pts: Marques Johnson 22; Rebs: Bob Lanier 10; Asts: Quinn Buckner 6	Pts: Bobby Jones 22; Rebs: Julius Erving 13; Asts: Maurice Cheeks 6
Series tied, 1–1

Spectrum, Philadelphia, Pennsylvania
Attendance: 15,259
Referees: John Vanak, Paul Mihalak

April 10

Boxscore

Philadelphia 76ers 108, Milwaukee Bucks 103
Scoring by quarter: 28–32, 26–22, 33–25, 21–24
Pts: Erving, Dawkins 23 each Rebs: Caldwell Jones 13; Asts: Maurice Cheeks 9	Pts: Marques Johnson 29; Rebs: Marques Johnson 9 Asts: Marques Johnson 8
Philadelphia leads series, 2–1

MECCA Arena, Milwaukee, Wisconsin
Attendance: 11,052

April 12

Boxscore

Philadelphia 76ers 98, Milwaukee Bucks 109
Scoring by quarter: 21–35, 28–26, 24–17, 25–31
Pts: Julius Erving 22; Rebs: Caldwell Jones 8 Asts: Maurice Cheeks 8	Pts: Marques Johnson 35; Rebs: Sidney Moncrief 10; Asts: Marques Johnson 7
Series tied, 2–2

MECCA Arena, Milwaukee, Wisconsin
Attendance: 11,052
Referees: Joe Gushue, Paul Mihalak

April 15

Boxscore

Milwaukee Bucks 99, Philadelphia 76ers 116
Scoring by quarter: 22–27, 25–31, 26–30, 26–28
Pts: Mickey Johnson, Moncrief 20 each Rebs: Mickey Johnson 13; Asts: Marques Johnson 7	Pts: Cheeks, Hollins 20 each Rebs: Julius Erving 9 Asts: Maurice Cheeks 10
Philadelphia leads series, 3–2

Spectrum, Philadelphia, Pennsylvania
Attendance: 15,384

April 17

Boxscore

Philadelphia 76ers 86, Milwaukee Bucks 109
Scoring by quarter: 19–24, 26–20, 21–30, 20–35
Pts: Julius Erving 25; Rebs: Julius Erving 7 Asts: Maurice Cheeks 7	Pts: Mickey Johnson 22; Rebs: Mickey Johnson 12; Asts: Lanier, Buckner 6 each
Series tied, 3–3

MECCA Arena, Milwaukee, Wisconsin
Attendance: 11,052

April 19

Boxscore

Milwaukee Bucks 98, Philadelphia 76ers 99
Scoring by quarter: 28–28, 20–30, 25–21, 25–20
Pts: Marques Johnson 36; Rebs: Bob Lanier 10; Asts: four players 4 each	Pts: Julius Erving 28; Rebs: Caldwell Jones 12; Asts: Maurice Cheeks 11
Philadelphia wins series, 4–3

Spectrum, Philadelphia, Pennsylvania
Attendance: 6,704

Regular-season series
Milwaukee won 3–2 in the regular-season series

October 10, 1980

Recap

Milwaukee Bucks 106, Philadelphia 76ers 103

Spectrum, Philadelphia

November 9, 1980

Recap

Philadelphia 76ers 136, Milwaukee Bucks 121

MECCA Arena, Milwaukee

January 15, 1981

Recap

Philadelphia 76ers 110, Milwaukee Bucks 113

MECCA Arena, Milwaukee

March 8, 1981

Recap

Milwaukee Bucks 100, Philadelphia 76ers 123

Spectrum, Philadelphia

March 13, 1981

Recap

Philadelphia 76ers 104, Milwaukee Bucks 120

MECCA Arena, Milwaukee

This was the second playoff meeting between these two teams, with the Bucks winning the first meeting.

Previous playoff series
Milwaukee leads 1–0 in all-time playoff series

1970

Milwaukee Bucks 4, Philadelphia 76ers 1

1970 Eastern Division Semifinals

=== Western Conference semifinals ===
This was the first time both conference semifinals went seven games. This would happen again in 1994 and in 2006.

==== (1) Phoenix Suns vs. (5) Kansas City Kings ====
April 7

Boxscore

Kansas City Kings 80, Phoenix Suns 102
Scoring by quarter: 20–23, 26–28, 12–24, 22–27
Pts: Reggie King 15; Rebs: Reggie King 8 Asts: Lloyd Walton 6	Pts: Johnson, Davis 16 each Rebs: Jeff Cook 12; Asts: three players 4 each
Phoenix leads series, 1–0

Arizona Veterans Memorial Coliseum, Phoenix, Arizona
Attendance: 12,660

April 8

Boxscore

Kansas City Kings 88, Phoenix Suns 83
Scoring by quarter: 24–20, 19–23, 18–20, 27–20
Pts: Scott Wedman 24; Rebs: Reggie King 12; Asts: Ernie Grunfeld 8	Pts: Dennis Johnson 31; Rebs: Truck Robinson 8 Asts: Alvan Adams 4
Series tied, 1–1

Arizona Veterans Memorial Coliseum, Phoenix, Arizona
Attendance: 12,660

April 10

Boxscore

Phoenix Suns 92, Kansas City Kings 93
Scoring by quarter: 20–22, 29–18, 21–28, 22–25
Pts: Johnson, Adams 19 each Rebs: Dennis Johnson 9 Asts: three players 4 each	Pts: Reggie King 29; Rebs: Sam Lacey 12; Asts: Ernie Grunfeld 7
Kansas City leads series, 2–1

Kemper Arena, Kansas City, Missouri
Attendance: 13,776

April 12

Boxscore

Phoenix Suns 95, Kansas City Kings 102
Scoring by quarter: 27–33, 23–22, 22–23, 23–24
Pts: Truck Robinson 23; Rebs: Truck Robinson 13; Asts: Alvan Adams 4	Pts: Ernie Grunfeld 27; Rebs: Sam Lacey 11; Asts: Sam Lacey 10
Kansas City leads series, 3–1

Kemper Arena, Kansas City, Missouri
Attendance: 11,089

April 15

Boxscore

Kansas City Kings 89, Phoenix Suns 101
Scoring by quarter: 25–23, 15–29, 23–21, 26–28
Pts: Reggie King 29; Rebs: Douglas, Lacey 8 each Asts: Ernie Grunfeld 8	Pts: Walter Davis 20; Rebs: Truck Robinson 20; Asts: Johnson, Davis 4 each
Kansas City leads series, 3–2

Arizona Veterans Memorial Coliseum, Phoenix, Arizona
Attendance: 12,660

April 17

Boxscore

Phoenix Suns 81, Kansas City Kings 76
Scoring by quarter: 23–21, 19–16, 20–20, 19–19
Pts: Dennis Johnson 17; Rebs: Truck Robinson 10; Asts: Alvan Adams 7	Pts: Scott Wedman 19; Rebs: Sam Lacey 12; Asts: Ernie Grunfeld 8
Series tied, 3–3

Kemper Arena, Kansas City, Missouri
Attendance: 15,232

April 19

Boxscore

Kansas City Kings 95, Phoenix Suns 88
Scoring by quarter: 22–18, 22–26, 24–12, 27–32
Pts: Grunfeld, King 23 each Rebs: King, Lacey 7 each Asts: Scott Wedman 9	Pts: Dennis Johnson 28; Rebs: Johnson, Adams 7 each Asts: Dennis Johnson 5
Kansas City wins series, 4–3

Arizona Veterans Memorial Coliseum, Phoenix, Arizona
Attendance: 12,660

- The Kings became the 2nd NBA road team to win Game 7 after leading series 3–1 and the 1st #5 seed to eliminate #1 seed.

Regular-season series
Kansas City won 3–2 in the regular-season series

October 12, 1980

Recap

Kansas City Kings 100, Phoenix Suns 109

Arizona Veterans Memorial Coliseum, Phoenix, Arizona

November 1, 1980

Recap

Phoenix Suns 127, Kansas City Kings 100

Kemper Arena, Kansas City, Missouri

December 3, 1980

Recap

Phoenix Suns 100, Kansas City Kings 103

Kemper Arena, Kansas City, Missouri

March 8, 1981

Recap

Phoenix Suns 68, Kansas City Kings 105

Kemper Arena, Kansas City, Missouri

March 25, 1981

Recap

Kansas City Kings 110, Phoenix Suns 101

Arizona Veterans Memorial Coliseum, Phoenix, Arizona

This was the third playoff meeting between these two teams, with the Suns winning the first two meetings.

Previous playoff series
Phoenix leads 2–0 in all-time playoff series

1979

Phoenix Suns 4, Kansas City Kings 2

1979 Western Conference Semifinals

1980

Phoenix Suns 2, Kansas City Kings 1

1980 Western Conference First Round

==== (2) San Antonio Spurs vs. (6) Houston Rockets ====
April 7

Boxscore

Houston Rockets 107, San Antonio Spurs 98
Scoring by quarter: 26–27, 36–26, 22–20, 23–25
Pts: Moses Malone 27; Rebs: Moses Malone 10; Asts: Reid, Murphy 6 each	Pts: George Gervin 30; Rebs: George Johnson 12; Asts: Paul Griffin 7
Houston leads series, 1–0

HemisFair Arena, San Antonio, Texas
Attendance: 13,319

April 8

Boxscore

Houston Rockets 113, San Antonio Spurs 125
Scoring by quarter: 26–30, 25–32, 29–26, 33–37
Pts: Calvin Murphy 34; Rebs: Moses Malone 12; Asts: Robert Reid 10	Pts: Mark Olberding 34; Rebs: G. Johnson, Griffin 7 each Asts: Dave Corzine 7
Series tied, 1–1

HemisFair Arena, San Antonio, Texas
Attendance: 12,128

April 10

Boxscore

San Antonio Spurs 99, Houston Rockets 112
Scoring by quarter: 34–29, 23–32, 27–25, 15–26
Pts: George Gervin 33; Rebs: Gervin, G. Johnson 8 each Asts: Mark Olberding 5	Pts: Moses Malone 41; Rebs: Moses Malone 15; Asts: Reid, Murphy 4 each
Houston leads series, 2–1

The Summit, Houston, Texas
Attendance: 16,121

April 12

Boxscore

San Antonio Spurs 114, Houston Rockets 112
Scoring by quarter: 23–25, 32–28, 31–24, 28–35
Pts: George Gervin 33; Rebs: Dave Corzine 11; Asts: Mark Olberding 6	Pts: Robert Reid 33; Rebs: Moses Malone 9 Asts: Reid, Henderson 6 each
Series tied, 2–2

The Summit, Houston, Texas
Attendance: 16,121

April 14

Boxscore

Houston Rockets 123, San Antonio Spurs 117
Scoring by quarter: 29–29, 31–27, 31–28, 32–33
Pts: Calvin Murphy 36; Rebs: Moses Malone 13; Asts: Tom Henderson 7	Pts: Reggie Johnson 25; Rebs: George Johnson 11; Asts: George Gervin 9
Houston leads series, 3–2

HemisFair Arena, San Antonio, Texas
Attendance: 16,114

April 15

Boxscore

San Antonio Spurs 101, Houston Rockets 96
Scoring by quarter: 27–33, 35–24, 17–23, 22–16
Pts: George Gervin 26; Rebs: three players 8 each Asts: Mark Olberding 8	Pts: Moses Malone 36; Rebs: Moses Malone 10; Asts: Reid, Henderson 7 each
Series tied, 3–3

The Summit, Houston, Texas
Attendance: 16,121

April 17

Boxscore

Houston Rockets 105, San Antonio Spurs 100
Scoring by quarter: 34–30, 23–36, 22–12, 26–22
Pts: Calvin Murphy 42; Rebs: Moses Malone 16; Asts: Tom Henderson 8	Pts: George Gervin 21; Rebs: George Johnson 10; Asts: Johnny Moore 10
Houston wins series, 4–3

HemisFair Arena, San Antonio, Texas
Attendance: 16,114

Regular-season series
Tied 3–3 in the regular-season series

November 28, 1980

Recap

Houston Rockets 124, San Antonio Spurs 115

HemisFair Arena, San Antonio

December 17, 1980

Recap

San Antonio Spurs 113, Houston Rockets 107

The Summit, Houston, Texas

February 11, 1981

Recap

San Antonio Spurs 89, Houston Rockets 108

The Summit, Houston, Texas

March 1, 1981

Recap

Houston Rockets 86, San Antonio Spurs 102

HemisFair Arena, San Antonio

March 25, 1981

Recap

San Antonio Spurs 111, Houston Rockets 117

The Summit, Houston, Texas

March 29, 1981

Recap

Houston Rockets 109, San Antonio Spurs 135

HemisFair Arena, San Antonio

This was the second playoff meeting between these two teams, with the Rockets winning the first meeting.

Previous playoff series
Houston leads 1–0 in all-time playoff series

1980

Houston Rockets 2, San Antonio Spurs 1

1980 Eastern Conference First Round

== Conference finals ==
=== Eastern Conference finals ===
==== (1) Boston Celtics vs. (3) Philadelphia 76ers ====
John Hollinger of ESPN.com ranked this as the greatest playoff series in NBA history

April 21

Boxscore

Philadelphia 76ers 105, Boston Celtics 104
Scoring by quarter: 24–32, 31–22, 22–25, 28–25
Pts: Andrew Toney 26; Rebs: Julius Erving 9 Asts: Maurice Cheeks 8	Pts: Larry Bird 33; Rebs: Robert Parish 13; Asts: Tiny Archibald 9
Philadelphia leads series, 1–0

Boston Garden, Boston, Massachusetts
Attendance: 15,320
Referees: John Vanak, Wally Rooney

April 22

Boxscore

Philadelphia 76ers 99, Boston Celtics 118
Scoring by quarter: 22–30, 25–36, 26–25, 26–27
Pts: Andrew Toney 35; Rebs: Dawkins, Toney 7 each Asts: Andrew Toney 7	Pts: Larry Bird 34; Rebs: Larry Bird 16; Asts: Larry Bird 5
Series tied, 1–1

Boston Garden, Boston, Massachusetts
Attendance: 15,320
Referees: Darell Garretson, Lee Jones

April 24

Boxscore

Boston Celtics 100, Philadelphia 76ers 110
Scoring by quarter: 20–31, 27–31, 26–27, 27–21
Pts: Larry Bird 22; Rebs: Larry Bird 13; Asts: Tiny Archibald 5	Pts: Julius Erving 22; Rebs: Caldwell Jones 14; Asts: Maurice Cheeks 8
Philadelphia leads series, 2–1

Spectrum, Philadelphia, Pennsylvania
Attendance: 18,276
Referees: Joe Gushue, Ed T. Rush

April 26

Boxscore

Boston Celtics 105, Philadelphia 76ers 107
Scoring by quarter: 27–34, 21–31, 31–17, 26–25
Pts: Cedric Maxwell 20; Rebs: Larry Bird 17; Asts: Tiny Archibald 14	Pts: Julius Erving 20; Rebs: Caldwell Jones 10; Asts: Maurice Cheeks 10
Philadelphia leads series, 3–1

Spectrum, Philadelphia, Pennsylvania
Attendance: 18,276
Referees: Jake O'Donnell, Bill Saar

April 29

Boxscore

Philadelphia 76ers 109, Boston Celtics 111
Scoring by quarter: 22–24, 37–25, 26–35, 24–27
Pts: Lionel Hollins 23; Rebs: Darryl Dawkins 8 Asts: Erving, Hollins 5 each	Pts: Larry Bird 32; Rebs: Larry Bird 11; Asts: Tiny Archibald 7
Philadelphia leads series, 3–2

Boston Garden, Boston, Massachusetts
Attendance: 15,320
Referees: Earl Strom, Hugh Evans

May 1

Boxscore

Boston Celtics 100, Philadelphia 76ers 98
Scoring by quarter: 18–31, 24–20, 28–22, 30–25
Pts: Larry Bird 25; Rebs: Larry Bird 16; Asts: Tiny Archibald 6	Pts: Darryl Dawkins 24; Rebs: Caldwell Jones 8 Asts: Maurice Cheeks 8
Series tied, 3–3

Spectrum, Philadelphia, Pennsylvania
Attendance: 18,276
Referees: Jack Madden, Paul Mihalak

May 3

Boxscore

Philadelphia 76ers 90, Boston Celtics 91
Scoring by quarter: 31–26, 22–22, 22–23, 15–20
Pts: Julius Erving 23; Rebs: Caldwell Jones 15; Asts: Maurice Cheeks 7	Pts: Larry Bird 23; Rebs: Larry Bird 11; Asts: Tiny Archibald 7
Boston wins series, 4–3

Boston Garden, Boston, Massachusetts
Attendance: 15,320
Referees: Darell Garretson, Jake O'Donnell

Regular-season series
Tied 3–3 in the regular-season series

November 1, 1980

Recap

Boston Celtics 113, Philadelphia 76ers 117 (OT)

Spectrum, Philadelphia

January 28, 1981

Recap

Philadelphia 76ers 101, Boston Celtics 104

Boston Garden, Boston

February 4, 1981

Recap

Boston Celtics 104, Philadelphia 76ers 107

Spectrum, Philadelphia

March 1, 1981

Recap

Philadelphia 76ers 107, Boston Celtics 114

Boston Garden, Boston

March 22, 1981

Recap

Boston Celtics 94, Philadelphia 76ers 126

Spectrum, Philadelphia

March 29, 1981

Recap

Philadelphia 76ers 94, Boston Celtics 98

Boston Garden, Boston

This was the 16th playoff meeting between these two teams, with the Celtics winning eight of the first 15 meetings.

Previous playoff series
Boston leads 8–7 in all-time playoff series

1953

Boston Celtics 2, Syracuse Nationals 0

1953 Eastern Division Semifinals

1954

Boston Celtics 0, Syracuse Nationals 2

1954 Eastern Division Round Robin Semifinals

1954

Boston Celtics 0, Syracuse Nationals 2

1954 Eastern Division Finals

1955

Boston Celtics 1, Syracuse Nationals 3

1955 Eastern Division Finals

1956

Boston Celtics 1, Syracuse Nationals 2

1956 Eastern Division Semifinals

1957

Boston Celtics 3, Syracuse Nationals 0

1957 Eastern Division Finals

1959

Boston Celtics 4, Syracuse Nationals 3

1959 Eastern Division Finals

1961

Boston Celtics 4, Syracuse Nationals 1

1961 Eastern Division Finals

1965

Boston Celtics 4, Philadelphia 76ers 3

1965 Eastern Division Finals

1966

Boston Celtics 4, Philadelphia 76ers 1

1966 Eastern Division Finals

1967

Recap

Boston Celtics 1, Philadelphia 76ers 4

1967 Eastern Division Finals

1968

Boston Celtics 4, Philadelphia 76ers 3

1968 Eastern Division Finals

1969

Boston Celtics 4, Philadelphia 76ers 1

1969 Eastern Division Semifinals

1977

Boston Celtics 3, Philadelphia 76ers 4

1977 Eastern Conference Semifinals

1980

Boston Celtics 1, Philadelphia 76ers 4

1980 Eastern Conference Finals

In Game 4, the Sixers led 93–86 midway through the fourth quarter, when Cedric Maxwell scored and drew the foul on Darryl Dawkins. He completed the three-point play. Larry Bird pushed the ball up court after a Sixers turnover. He pulled up and hit a mid-range shot to make it 93–91. Then after a Dawkins miss, Bird grabbed the rebound and threw a quick outlet pass that led to a fast-break layup to tie it at 93.

The teams traded baskets for four straight trips before the Sixers took a 101–97 lead with 4 minutes left. They traded baskets again, with Julius Erving finishing the scoring for the 76ers with a dunk over Robert Parish and two free throws for a 107–103 lead with 2:30 left. With over a minute left, Caldwell Jones lost his shoe in a scramble and played defense with it in one hand. Nate Archibald took advantage and drove right at Jones, who allowed him a free lane for an easy lay-up to make it 107–105 (he held the shoe instead of tossing it away to have both hands free or using it to his advantage to block the shot).

In the final minute, Philadelphia committed a shot-clock violation, giving Boston a chance to tie or go ahead. But Parish's turn-around shot rolled out. The rebound was tipped between two Sixers players and almost went out-of-bounds before Erving got it to Maurice Cheeks with 30 seconds left. The Sixers used as much time as they could, but Bobby Jones missed a runner and Maxwell got the rebound with 7 seconds left. He passed it to Archibald, who forced a half-court pass to Bird that Bobby Jones intercepted to end the game and give Philadelphia a 3–1 series lead.

Game 5 was back in Boston, and the Celtics were in a must-win situation. Bobby Jones' block on Gerald Henderson led to a fast-break lay-up by Andrew Toney to give the 76ers a 103–99 lead. The teams traded buckets the next four trips until a missed jumper by Bird and two Dawkins free throws made it 109–103 with 1:51 left. Dawkins got a steal, but Maxwell's game-saving block prevented a Philadelphia lay-up and led to an Archibald three-point play with 1:20 left that made it 109–106. Boston then got another block by Parish. The Sixers recovered the ball, but lost it out-of-bounds seconds later.

Bird's lay-up made it 109–108 with 47 seconds left. After a Sixers timeout, Bobby Jones' inbounds pass was deflected by Bird, then tipped by Dawkins. Bird reached for the ball while Jones put his hands up to show he didn't touch it as the ball went out-of-bounds. The referees gave the 76ers the ball, much to Bird's dismay. He argued to the refs that he didn't touch it. They met to make a decision. After a few minutes, possession was awarded to the 76ers, and Jones cleanly inbounded to Dawkins. He passed to Hollins, who gave it to Toney, who almost lost and palmed the ball, but the referees let play continue despite the jeers from the crowd. Toney tried to get the ball to Erving, but M.L. Carr deflected it out-of-bounds.

The last 29 seconds had a few moments that were reminiscent of earlier Boston Garden lore. Erving stood in almost the same spot where Hal Greer had his pass stolen by John Havlicek to seal the 1965 Eastern Division Finals. However, the 76ers were ahead this time. Erving inbounded the ball, but it got past Jones and started rolling along the sideline. Bird grabbed it and drove to the hoop with only Jones to stop him. He beat Bird to the hoop to challenge his floater. Carr got the rebound and missed, but a foul was called on Erving. With the season on the line and 20 seconds left, Carr hit both to give Boston a 110–109 lead.

After a timeout, Lionel Hollins took the ball up court and passed to Bobby Jones, who passed it to Erving. With Maxwell defending and Bird coming to double-team, Erving passed back out to Jones. With the clock ticking away, he drove and missed a floater with 7 seconds left. Carr got the rebound and ran the clock down to 1 second before Erving fouled him. Like Game 5 of the 1976 NBA Finals, the fans and media ran onto the court thinking it was over. Once it was cleared, Carr had to shoot the free throws. He hit the first to make it 111–109, then intentionally missed the next two (the 3-to-make-2 rule). Dawkins got the rebound and called timeout. The crowd huddled around the court with 1 second left and Jones standing in nearly the same spot that Curtis Perry stood before passing the ball to Gar Heard. This time, things turned out better as Parish stole it to keep Boston alive. But the Sixers still led 3–2 and were going back home.

In Game 6, Philadelphia was looking to clinch at home, and it looked like they would, as they were up by 17 at one point. But with the season on the line yet again, the Celtics fought back. With the game tied at 87 late in the fourth, Erving was blocked from behind by Bird underneath the basket. On the Celtics' end of the court, Archibald missed a 15-footer, but followed his own miss and went right back up for a layup. Cheeks hit a reverse lay-up to tie it at 89. He fouled out on the next possession. Parish hit both free throws to give Boston a 91–89 lead. After Boston failed to capitalize on a Sixers turnover, Erving tied it at 91 with a layup over Parish. After Bird traveled, Dawkins was fouled and hit both free throws to give the Sixers a 93–91 lead. This was short-lived, as Parish hit a baseline jumper and drew the foul. He completed the 3-point play to give Boston a 94–93 lead with under 3 minutes left.

A Dawkins dunk and two Archibald free throws further swayed the lead. A Hollins miss gave Boston a chance to build the lead, but Parish left after being called for an offensive foul, his sixth. That brought in rookie Kevin McHale to guard Dawkins. The Sixers went right at him, but he played good defense and forced Dawkins to miss. Bird hit an 18-footer to give Boston a 98–95 lead with 1 minute left. Toney answered by hitting a 20-footer with 54 seconds and stealing the ball from Bird with 29 seconds left and the Sixers down 1. He went for the lead, but McHale blocked it and got the ball with 14 seconds left. He passed the ball ahead to Archibald and Boston played keep away. The Sixers didn't foul until 2 seconds left. Maxwell made both foul shots to give Boston a 100–97 lead. After a timeout, the Sixers inbounded at midcourt.

The first attempt was deflected out-of-bounds by Bird, but 2 seconds still showed on the clock. However, it moved the position of the inbounds pass upcourt, making Billy Cunningham decide to take their final timeout to draw up a play from the new position. McHale's defense prevented Jones from inbounding to Toney in the corner, but he found Dr. J at the top of the key, who was immediately fouled by Archibald to prevent him from handling the ball cleanly to even try to shoot a 3. So with 1 second left, Erving had two foul shots while down 3. The Sixers still had a chance if he made the first and missed the second. He missed the first. Erving hit the second to make it 100–98. After a timeout, the Celtics inbounded from midcourt and tied the series at 3 heading back home for Game 7.

Like the last three games, Game 7 came down to the wire. It finally looked like the 76ers' night as they led by 7 with 4:34 left. Maxwell and Archibald brought Boston within 4 from the line. A Parish steal and a turn-around jumper cut it to 2. Parish blocked Dawkins' lay-up, which led to a fast-break, but Maxwell lost his balance and traveled. "Tiny" Archibald got a steal leading to a Bird dunk attempt that missed, but was fouled by Erving; his fifth. Bird missed the first, but made the next two to tie it at 89 with 2:51 left.

The 76ers' next trip downcourt was a wild one. Dr. J almost traveled, a pass got deflected out of bounds, Caldwell Jones got the offensive rebound off a Dr. J miss, and a Bird block on Erving, led to a scramble for the ball that saw bodies fly all over the court. It eventually rolled to Hollins, who got it off before the shot clock expired, but missed. A battle for the rebound almost saw Bird tip it out-of-bounds, but as the ball bounced precariously near the baseline, he grabbed it and got it to "Tiny" to give Boston a chance to take the lead.

On Boston's possession, Parish threw up an airball that went out-of-bounds off Hollins, giving the Celtics a second chance. However, "Tiny" missed a long-range 2, and the rebound bounced off Boston. The Sixers then put the ball in the hands of Erving and Dawkins as they traded the ball back and forth to wear down the Celtics defense. Parish, Maxwell, and Bird played tough defense, and forced a Dawkins miss that Bird rebounded. He led the fast-break himself and hit a mid-range bank shot to give Boston a 91–89 lead with 1:03 left.

With the 76ers looking to tie or go ahead, Erving's pass was stolen by Carr with 47 seconds left. But Boston was without Archibald, who got injured a couple plays back. Henderson had the ball poked away by Hollins to Cheeks, who kept it on the fast-break. He drove to the basket and got fouled hard on a missed lay-up. He took a few moments to get up. He gutted it out though, and went to the line with a chance to tie it with 29 seconds left. He split the pair to make it 91–90.

The 76ers chose not to foul and played tough defense. Boston used up the entire shot-clock before Carr finally took a shot with 7 seconds. He missed, but Parish momentarily had a series-ending offensive rebound, but lost it. Bobby Jones finally got the rebound and called time with 1 second left. So with a chance to win, he had to inbound the ball with fans, security, and media huddled around the court. With Bird defending, Jones lobbed a pass towards the basket, but it hit the top of the backboard. Cedric Maxwell tipped it to end the series as the Garden crowd stormed the court. Boston became the fourth team in NBA history to overcome a 3–1 series deficit, and the third team to do so in the Conference Finals.

=== Western Conference finals ===
==== (5) Kansas City Kings vs. (6) Houston Rockets ====
April 21

Boxscore

Houston Rockets 97, Kansas City Kings 78
Scoring by quarter: 20–23, 24–18, 22–19, 31–18
Pts: Moses Malone 29; Rebs: Moses Malone 12; Asts: Mike Dunleavy 6	Pts: Ernie Grunfeld 20; Rebs: Reggie King 12; Asts: Lacey, Ford 7 each
Houston leads series, 1–0

Kemper Arena, Kansas City, Missouri
Attendance: 13,885

April 22

Boxscore

Houston Rockets 79, Kansas City Kings 88
Scoring by quarter: 26–22, 22–25, 13–21, 18–20
Pts: Moses Malone 18; Rebs: Moses Malone 15; Asts: Tom Henderson 7	Pts: Reggie King 31; Rebs: Reggie King 10; Asts: King, Lacey 6 each
Series tied, 1–1

Kemper Arena, Kansas City, Missouri
Attendance: 14,326

April 24

Boxscore

Kansas City Kings 88, Houston Rockets 92
Scoring by quarter: 16–24, 22–23, 20–25, 30–20
Pts: Wedman, King 22 each Rebs: Reggie King 8 Asts: Scott Wedman 7	Pts: Reid, Paultz 20 each Rebs: Malone, Paultz 12 each Asts: Mike Dunleavy 10
Houston leads series, 2–1

The Summit, Houston, Texas
Attendance: 16,121

April 26

Boxscore

Kansas City Kings 89, Houston Rockets 100
Scoring by quarter: 19–20, 26–26, 24–29, 20–25
Pts: Reggie King 24; Rebs: King, Lacey 8 each Asts: Phil Ford 10	Pts: Moses Malone 42; Rebs: Moses Malone 23; Asts: Robert Reid 9
Houston leads series, 3–1

The Summit, Houston, Texas
Attendance: 16,121

April 29

Boxscore

Houston Rockets 97, Kansas City Kings 88
Scoring by quarter: 20–25, 30–25, 23–27, 24–11
Pts: Moses Malone 36; Rebs: Moses Malone 11; Asts: Tom Henderson 6	Pts: Scott Wedman 20; Rebs: Reggie King 16; Asts: Sam Lacey 7
Houston wins series, 4–1

Kemper Arena, Kansas City, Missouri
Attendance: 14,640

Regular-season series
Kansas City won 4–2 in the regular-season series

October 23, 1980

Recap

Kansas City Kings 105, Houston Rockets 96

The Summit, Houston, Texas

December 5, 1980

Recap

Houston Rockets 100, Kansas City Kings 108

Kemper Arena, Kansas City, Missouri

January 7, 1981

Recap

Kansas City Kings 114, Houston Rockets 108

The Summit, Houston, Texas

January 23, 1981

Recap

Houston Rockets 107, Kansas City Kings 113

Kemper Arena, Kansas City, Missouri

March 22, 1981

Recap

Houston Rockets 114, Kansas City Kings 108

Kemper Arena, Kansas City, Missouri

March 27, 1981

Recap

Kansas City Kings 84, Houston Rockets 91

The Summit, Houston, Texas

This was the first playoff meeting between the Rockets and the Kings.

== NBA Finals: (E1) Boston Celtics vs. (W6) Houston Rockets ==
May 5

Boxscore

Houston Rockets 95, Boston Celtics 98
Scoring by quarter: 29–24, 28–27, 24–25, 14–22
Pts: Robert Reid 27; Rebs: Moses Malone 15; Asts: Mike Dunleavy 7	Pts: Larry Bird 18; Rebs: Larry Bird 21; Asts: Larry Bird 9
Boston leads series, 1–0

Boston Garden, Boston, Massachusetts
Attendance: 15,320
Referees: Darell Garretson, Jack Madden

- Larry Bird's famous play of following a missed jumper, jumping for the rebound, and switching ball from his right to left hand as his momentum was carrying him out of bounds as he scored.

May 7

Boxscore

Houston Rockets 92, Boston Celtics 90
Scoring by quarter: 22–26, 23–23, 23–19, 24–22
Pts: Moses Malone 31; Rebs: Moses Malone 15; Asts: three players 3 each	Pts: Larry Bird 19; Rebs: Larry Bird 21; Asts: Archibald, Henderson 4 each
Series tied, 1–1

Boston Garden, Boston, Massachusetts
Attendance: 15,320
Referees: Jake O'Donnell, Joe Gushue

May 9

Boxscore

Boston Celtics 94, Houston Rockets 71
Scoring by quarter: 21–17, 20–13, 24–18, 29–23
Pts: Cedric Maxwell 19; Rebs: Larry Bird 13; Asts: Larry Bird 10	Pts: Moses Malone 23; Rebs: Moses Malone 15; Asts: three players 2 each
Boston leads series, 2–1

The Summit, Houston, Texas
Attendance: 16,121
Referees: John Vanak, Earl Strom

May 10

Boxscore

Boston Celtics 86, Houston Rockets 91
Scoring by quarter: 26–26, 24–24, 17–25, 19–16
Pts: Cedric Maxwell 24; Rebs: Cedric Maxwell 14; Asts: Larry Bird 7	Pts: Mike Dunleavy 28; Rebs: Moses Malone 22; Asts: Tom Henderson 9
Series tied, 2–2

The Summit, Houston, Texas
Attendance: 16,121
Referees: Darell Garretson, Ed T. Rush

May 12

Boxscore

Houston Rockets 80, Boston Celtics 109
Scoring by quarter: 19–34, 18–25, 18–18, 25–32
Pts: Moses Malone 20; Rebs: Moses Malone 11; Asts: Allen Leavell 6	Pts: Cedric Maxwell 28; Rebs: Cedric Maxwell 15; Asts: Larry Bird 8
Boston leads series, 3–2

Boston Garden, Boston, Massachusetts
Attendance: 15,320
Referees: Earl Strom, Paul Mihalik, Joe Gushue

May 14

Boxscore

Boston Celtics 102, Houston Rockets 91
Scoring by quarter: 25–24, 28–23, 29–20, 20–24
Pts: Larry Bird 27; Rebs: Larry Bird 13; Asts: Tiny Archibald 12	Pts: Robert Reid 27; Rebs: Moses Malone 16; Asts: Henderson, Reid 5 each
Boston wins series, 4–2

The Summit, Houston, Texas
Attendance: 16,121
Referees: Jake O'Donnell, Jack Madden

Regular-season series
Boston won 2–0 in the regular-season series

December 19, 1980

Recap

Houston Rockets 119, Boston Celtics 133

Boston Garden, Boston

March 4, 1981

Recap

Boston Celtics 108, Houston Rockets 101

The Summit, Houston, Texas

This was the third playoff meeting between these two teams, with the Celtics winning the first two meetings.

Previous playoff series
Boston leads 2–0 in all-time playoff series

1975

Boston Celtics 4, Houston Rockets 1

1975 Eastern Conference Semifinals

1980

Boston Celtics 4, Houston Rockets 0

1980 Eastern Conference Semifinals
