= Bruise (disambiguation) =

A bruise is a type of hematoma caused by trauma.

Bruise, Bruises or Bruised may also refer to:

- Bruise (album), by Assemblage 23, released 2012
- Bruises (Cary Brothers album), released 2018
- Bruises (album), by Dia Frampton, release March 3, 2017
- "Bruises", a song by Chairlift from their 2008 album Does You Inspire You
- "Bruises" (Lewis Capaldi song), released 2017
- "Bruises" (Train song), released 2012
- Bruised (film), an American sports film
- "Bruised", a song by Sugababes from their 2005 album Taller in More Ways

== See also ==
- Bruise Brothers (disambiguation)
- Bruiser (disambiguation)
- Cerebral contusion, a bruise of the brain tissue
- Ecchymosis, a type of purpura, not necessarily caused by trauma
- Stone bruise, a painful foot condition
- Stone bruise (horse), a hoof injury
