= Bruise Brothers (San Antonio Spurs) =

Nickname of a group of San Antonio Spurs basketball players

Bruise Brothers were the six big men who played for the San Antonio Spurs in the early 1980s: Dave Corzine, Reggie Johnson, Paul Griffin, Mark Olberding, Kevin Restani and George T. Johnson.

In the 1980–81 season, they led the NBA in rebounds, blocked shots (3rd in fouls) and led the Spurs to a 52–30 record and a division title, while showing San Antonio a new brand of basketball built on hustle, physical play and a blue collar work ethic. In December 1980, the team recognized the "Bruise Brothers" nickname when it gave away 10,000 free posters using it to identify their front line. The name evoked the recently released hit film, The Blues Brothers. During this period, many fans would show up to the HemisFair Arena dressed as the characters played by Dan Aykroyd and John Belushi in the film. Music used in the film was also played by the arena's loudspeaker.

The group was broken up in the fall of 1982, when Olberding and Corzine were traded to the Chicago Bulls for Artis Gilmore.
