= Paul Griffin (basketball) =

American basketball player

Personal information
- Born: January 1, 1954 (age 72) Shelby, Michigan, U.S.
- Listed height: 6 ft 9 in (2.06 m)
- Listed weight: 205 lb (93 kg)

Career information
- High school: Shelby (Shelby, Michigan)
- College: Western Michigan (1972–1976)
- NBA draft: 1976: 5th round, 74th overall pick
- Drafted by: New Orleans Jazz
- Playing career: 1976–1983
- Position: Power forward / center
- Number: 30

Career history
- 1976–1979: New Orleans Jazz
- 1979–1983: San Antonio Spurs

Career highlights
- First-team All-MAC (1976)

Career NBA statistics
- Points: 2,443 (5.1 ppg)
- Rebounds: 2,650 (5.5 rpg)
- Assists: 1,116 (2.3 apg)
- Stats at NBA.com
- Stats at Basketball Reference

Paul Arthur Griffin (born January 20, 1954) is an American former professional basketball player in the National Basketball Association (NBA).

== Education and professional career ==
Paul Griffin attended Shelby High School in Shelby, Michigan, a small town in western Michigan near Lake Michigan. Griffin was the integral part on back-to-back class C Boys' Basketball State Championships in 1971 and 1972.

Griffin attended Western Michigan University from 1972 to 1976, leading the Broncos to their first NCAA basketball tournament berth in 1976 and an appearance in the Sweet Sixteen. He finished his career as WMU's all-time leading rebounder.

Griffin was selected by the New Orleans Jazz in the fifth round of the 1976 NBA draft, where he spent three seasons. He was acquired by the San Antonio Spurs for the 1979–80 season and remained there until the end of his NBA career in 1983. During the 1980s, Griffin and his Spurs teammates George Johnson, Dave Corzine, Kevin Restani, Mark Olberding and Reggie Johnson earned the nickname "The Bruise Brothers" for their physical style of play.

== Career statistics ==
Legend
GP	Games played	GS	Games started	MPG	Minutes per game
FG%	Field goal percentage	3P%	3-point field goal percentage	FT%	Free throw percentage
RPG	Rebounds per game	APG	Assists per game	SPG	Steals per game
BPG	Blocks per game	PPG	Points per game	**Bold**	Career high

=== NBA ===
==== Regular season ====
Year	Team	GP	GS	MPG	FG%	3P%	FT%	RPG	APG	SPG	BPG	PPG
1976–77	New Orleans	81		20.3	.547		.721	6.1	2.1	.6	.5	5.2
1977–78	New Orleans	**82**		22.6	.447		.713	**6.2**	2.1	**1.1**	.5	5.3
1978–79	New Orleans	77		18.2	.475		.619	5.1	1.8	.7	.5	3.9
1979–80	San Antonio	**82**		22.1	**.553**	–	**.725**	5.3	**3.0**	1.0	**.6**	**6.3**
1980–81	San Antonio	**82**		**23.5**	.511	–	.672	**6.2**	**3.0**	.9	.5	6.1
1981–82	San Antonio	23	0	20.0	.485	–	.649	4.1	2.3	.9	.3	3.8
1982–83	San Antonio	53	0	18.0	.517	–	.697	4.1	1.6	.6	.5	3.3
Career		480	0	20.9	.505	–	.692	5.5	2.3	.8	.5	5.1

==== Playoffs ====
Year	Team	GP	MPG	FG%	3P%	FT%	RPG	APG	SPG	BPG	PPG
1980	San Antonio	3	23.0	.500	–	**1.000**	5.0	2.0	.0	.3	**6.7**
1981	San Antonio	**7**	**26.1**	**.583**	–	.450	**5.7**	**4.1**	**.9**	**.7**	5.3
Career		10	25.2	.553	–	.577	5.5	3.5	.6	.6	5.7

== See also ==
- 1975–76 Western Michigan Broncos men's basketball team
