= Bruise Brothers =

Bruise Brothers may refer to:

- Bruise Brothers (San Antonio Spurs), a group of six big men who played for the San Antonio Spurs in the early 1980s
- Bruise Brothers (San Diego Chargers), a group of American football defensive lineman that played in the 1970s and 1980s
- The Bruise Brothers (professional wrestling), American professional wrestling tag team with Porkchop Cash and Dream Machine from the early 1980s
- The Bruise Brothers or The Harris Brothers, American professional wrestlers in the late 1980s
- Bruise Brothers, a strip from the British comic Buster
