= Jack Sikma =

American basketball player and coach (born 1955)

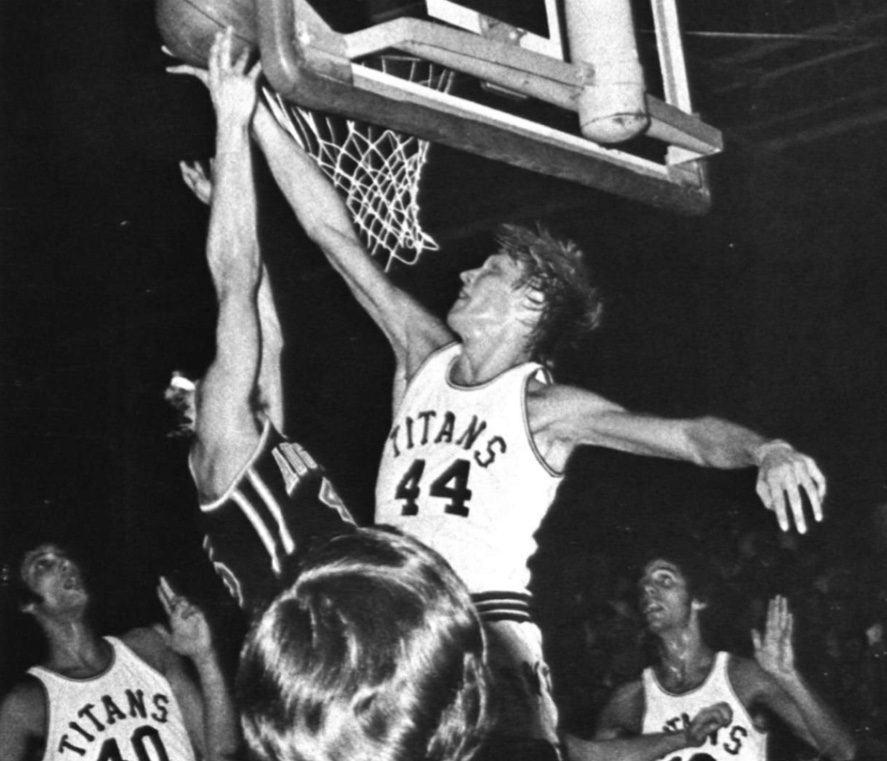
- Sikma at Illinois Wesleyan in 1977

Personal information
- Born: November 14, 1955 (age 71) Kankakee, Illinois, U.S.
- Listed height: 6 ft 11 in (2.11 m)
- Listed weight: 230 lb (104 kg)

Career information
- High school: St. Anne (St. Anne, Illinois)
- College: Illinois Wesleyan (1973–1977)
- NBA draft: 1977: 1st round, 8th overall pick
- Drafted by: Seattle SuperSonics
- Playing career: 1977–1991
- Position: Center / power forward
- Number: 43
- Coaching career: 2003–2014

Career history

Playing
- 1977–1986: Seattle SuperSonics
- 1986–1991: Milwaukee Bucks

Coaching
- 2003–2007: Seattle SuperSonics (assistant)
- 2007–2011: Houston Rockets (assistant)
- 2011–2014: Minnesota Timberwolves (assistant)

Career highlights
- NBA champion (1979); 7× NBA All-Star (1979–1985); NBA All-Defensive Second Team (1982); NBA All-Rookie First Team (1978); No. 43 retired by Seattle SuperSonics; 2× First-team NAIA All-American (1976, 1977); Third-team NAIA All-American (1975); 3× CCIW Player of the Year (1975–1977)

Career statistics
- Points: 17,287 (15.6 ppg)
- Rebounds: 10,816 (9.8 rpg)
- Assists: 3,488 (3.2 apg)
- Stats at NBA.com
- Stats at Basketball Reference
- Basketball Hall of Fame

Jack Wayne Sikma (born November 14, 1955) is an American former professional basketball center. He was a seven-time NBA All-Star with the Seattle SuperSonics, who drafted him in the first round with the eighth overall pick of the 1977 NBA draft. In 1979, he won an NBA championship with Seattle. Sikma finished his playing career with the Milwaukee Bucks. He was elected to the Naismith Basketball Hall of Fame in 2019.

He was known for his trademark reverse pivot and step back behind-the-head jumper, coined as the "Sikma move", along with his distinctive blond hair during his playing days, which he wore in a pageboy early in his career and in a perm later on. During his thirteen-year career, he reached the playoffs eleven times and established himself as an accurate outside-shooting center at a time when big men played in the paint. Sikma scored 17,287 points in his NBA career.

== Early life ==
Sikma was born in Kankakee, Illinois, to Grace and Clarence Sikma, and attended St. Anne High School in St. Anne, Illinois. He lived in rural Wichert, Illinois, growing up. Sikma was a guard his first three years of high school, before a growth spurt brought him to 6'10" going into his senior season. Nicknamed "the Wichert Wonder," Sikma led the St. Anne High School Cardinals to a fourth-place finish in the 1974 Illinois High School Association (IHSA) Class A boys basketball tournament, scoring 100 points in his four tournament games.

== Collegiate career ==
Sikma played collegiately at Illinois Wesleyan University in Bloomington, Illinois, majoring in accounting and graduating in 1977. After being heavily recruited by many Division I schools, Sikma was swayed by his close relationship with Illinois Wesleyan coach Dennie Bridges. Sikma also liked that Illinois Wesleyan had several Division I schools on their schedule.

At Illinois Wesleyan, Sikma was a three-time National Association of Intercollegiate Athletics (NAIA) All-American and averaged 27.0 points and 15.4 rebounds as a senior. Sikma was chosen as the College Conference of Illinois and Wisconsin (CCIW) Most Outstanding Player for three straight years. He was later inducted into the NAIA Hall of Fame (2012), the Small Schools Basketball Hall of Fame (2017) and was a member of the NAIA 50th & 75th All-Anniversary Teams. He was also a two-time Academic All-American and was selected to the CoSIDA Academic All-American Hall of Fame (1999).

At Illinois Wesleyan, Sikma remains the school's all-time leading scorer and rebounder, averaging 21.2 points (2,272 career points) and 13.1 rebounds (1,405 career rebounds). In each of his last three seasons, the Titans won College Conference of Illinois and Wisconsin Conference Championships and advanced to the NAIA Tournament.

== NBA career ==
=== Seattle Supersonics (1977–1986) ===
Sikma with the SuperSonics in 1978

Sikma was drafted with the eighth overall pick in the 1977 NBA draft by the Seattle SuperSonics. Due to the relatively small size of his alma mater, Sikma was considered an unknown quantity compared to the more publicized stars taken before him.

As a rookie in 1977–1978, Sikma averaged 10.7 points and 8.3 rebounds, and on March 24, 1978, scored a season high 28 points, paired with 10 rebounds and 5 assists in a 104–102 win over the Indiana Pacers. The Sonics made it to 1978 NBA Finals, losing to the Washington Bullets in seven games. Sikma was named to the NBA All-Rookie Team at the end of the season.

In 1978–1979, Sikma averaged 15.6 points and 12.4 rebounds and became an All-Star. He averaged a double-double of 14.8 points and 11.7 rebounds in the playoffs, including scoring a game high 33 points, 11 rebound effort, to lead Seattle to a Game 7 Western Conference Finals win over the Phoenix Suns. The Sonics then went on to defeat the Washington Bullets in a rematch in the 1979 NBA finals. Sikma's final free throws sealed Game 4 for the Sonics, who went on to win the series in five games.

In the 1979–80 season, the Sonics would win 56 games but fall to the Los Angeles Lakers 4–1 in the Western Conference Finals.

On November 13, 1981, Sikma scored a career-high 39 points in a 119–112 loss to the San Antonio Spurs.

In 1984, Sikma signed a five-year contract with the Supersonics. General Manager Les Habegger remarked, "After careful consideration, we concluded that we could look far and wide and never obtain another center of his caliber." In that season's All-Star Game, his sixth of seven consecutive appearances, Sikma recorded 15 points and 12 rebounds, his highest All-Star game totals in each. Sikma continued his All-Star caliber play, but was forced to undergo finger surgery in 1985.

In nine seasons and 715 games with Seattle, Sikma averaged a double-double of 16.8 points, 10.8 rebounds, along with 3.3 assists, 1.1 steals and 1.0 blocks, while shooting 47% from the field and 83% from the line.

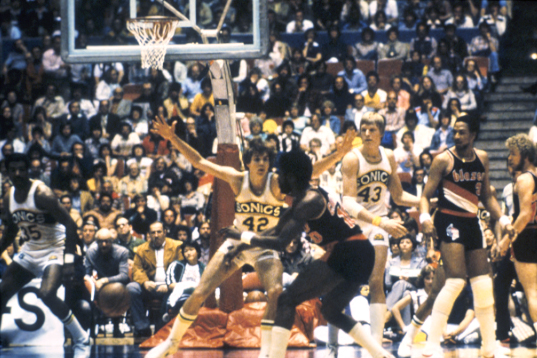
Sikma #43 vs. Portland, 1978

=== Milwaukee Bucks (1986–1991) ===
After missing the playoffs for two years, Sikma requested a trade from Seattle. In 1986, Sikma and Seattle's 1988 second-round draft pick were traded to the Milwaukee Bucks in exchange for Alton Lister and Milwaukee's first-round draft picks in 1987 and 1989. Later in response, Sports Illustrated would report:

Sikma was once a member of that elite caste of NBA players considered "untouchables," stars so closely identified with the city they play in that trading them would be unthinkable. Four years ago someone asked the Sonics' then-general manager, Zollie Volchok, if he would consider trading Sikma for Moses Malone. "I wouldn't trade Jack Sikma for the resurrection of Marilyn Monroe in my bedroom", was Volchok's reply.

Milwaukee Coach Don Nelson felt Sikma was the missing piece of a team that had frequently dominated the regular season before being exposed at the center position in the playoffs. Milwaukee struggled with injuries leading to the playoffs.

In the initial playoff series, Sikma scored 11 points in the fourth quarter of the final game to get past Charles Barkley and the Philadelphia 76ers. In the next series, the Bucks were defeated by the Boston Celtics in seven-games. Sikma averaged 17.6 points and 9.6 rebounds per game, and was one of eight players fined for fighting or leaving the bench to join a brawl.

During the following pre-season, Sikma and the Bucks participated in the diplomatically oriented Basketball Open, a round-robin, exhibition tournament, which included a match with the U.S.S.R. national team and the Italian national team (a country where Sikma was particularly popular).

On December 11, 1987, Sikma scored what would be his highest point total while on the Bucks, with 35 points alongside 7 rebounds, during a 125–117 win over the Portland Trail Blazers.

With the Bucks, Sikma showed his superb shooting skills and made the playoffs every year for the remainder of his career. Despite being the team's center, Sikma was one of the most effective free-throw shooters in the league, and would shoot technical free throws for the team. Sikma set a then-record of 51 games without a free throw miss. His late-career three point shooting was cited as an early sign of league-wide adoption.

In 1989, he would score 23 points and grab 8 rebound against the Seattle Supersonics in what was then the longest game in the shot clock era, with Milwaukee triumphing in a 4:17 five-overtime 155–154 win.

Sikma remained an effective big man into his final season, playing 77 regular season games and three in the playoffs, including twice grabbing 14 rebounds in a game.

In five seasons and 392 games with Milwaukee, Sikma averaged 13.4 points, 7.9 rebounds and 2.9 assists, while shooting 45% from the floor and 88% from the line.

=== Overall career ===
Sikma averaged a double-double in points and rebounds in eight seasons, always averaged double-digit points-per-game figures throughout his career, and after his stint with the Sonics, he maintained consistent numbers while playing with the Milwaukee Bucks in his final five seasons. For his career, Sikma averaged 15.6 points (17,287 in total) and 9.8 rebounds (10,816) over 14 seasons and 1107 games.

Sikma was one of the most accurate shooting centers in NBA history. He holds the rare distinction of leading the league in free-throw percentage (92.2%) while playing the center position during the 1987–88 season; he averaged 84.9% in free-throw shooting for his career. Sikma also made over 200 three-pointers during his career with a 32.8% three-point accuracy.

Along with his accurate shooting, Sikma led the league in defensive rebounds in both 1981–82 and 1983–84.

== Coaching career ==
From 2003 to 2007, Sikma was a Seattle SuperSonics assistant coach.

In June 2007 Sikma was hired by the Houston Rockets as an assistant coach under Coach Rick Adelman. Among his duties was tutoring center Yao Ming in "big man" playing strategies.

On December 6, 2011, he was signed as an assistant coach by the Minnesota Timberwolves, again under Adelman.

Beginning in 2017, Sikma acted as a coaching consultant for the Toronto Raptors, particularly working with center Jonas Valančiūnas.

== Legacy ==
Sikma was a pioneer as one of the earliest sharp-shooting big men, a role that would become common after the turn of the 21st century. As a center, Sikma's distinct shot and uncharacteristic accuracy allowed him to play a role outside of the paint. His signature Sikma-1/Sikma-2 moves were key to future centers with agility and a shooting touch. Instructional coach Pete Newell wrote on Sikma's signature move in his 2008 book, Playing Big, as "baseline moves for loose defenses. Towards the end of his career, where his lack of athleticism prevented Sikma from using his signature move, and no other big men appeared to be able to replicate it, he stated that coaches were inquiring him about the technique, even though he believed it would be defunct upon his retirement.

Sikma's combination of strength, height, rebounding ability, and a shooting touch from outside become a more common prototype long after his retirement, with much younger protegees like Yao Ming and Kevin Love becoming quality players in the NBA. On a January 2019 NBA TV segment, former players Chris Webber, Isiah Thomas, and Kevin McHale discussed his unexpected influence on modern-day basketball play with a segment entitled, "Jack Sikma's moves still being used today", discussing common moves taller players have since adopted to utilize their shooting and passing abilities. The "stretch 5" has since become common in the NBA, with the number of three pointers made by centers sharply increasing. His Sikma move remains widely taught in amateur basketball, including being one of College Basketball Hall of Fame coach Bo Ryan's five required skills for his team's big men, cited by local girls' basketball coaches in 2019, and strongly touted by college players born well after Sikma's retirement.

== Personal life ==
Sikma lived in Medina, Washington. A long-time Seattle-area resident, Sikma sold his mansion to Bill Gates in 1997 as a temporary residence while Gates's own home was being built.

Sikma married Shawn Strickland, a model, in 1984. Their son, Luke, played for the University of Portland Pilots, and plays professionally in Greece. A younger son, Nate, played for the University of Hartford Hawks men's basketball team.

American speed skater Bonnie Blair cited Sikma as an early sponsor before she won her Olympic medals.

== Honors ==
- Sikma was selected to the College Sports Information Directors of America (CoSIDA) Academic All-American Hall of Fame in 1998.
- In 2006, Sikma was voted as one of the 100 Legends of the IHSA Boys Basketball Tournament, a group of former players and coaches in honor of the 100 anniversary of the Illinois High School Boys Basketball Championship.
- In 2012, Sikma was inducted into the National Association of Intercollegiate Athletics Hall of Fame.
- On June 27, 2017, Sikma was inducted into the Small College Basketball Hall of Fame. Inducted alongside Sikma were Zelmo Beaty, Walt Frazier, Bob Love, Elmore Smith, Jim Spivey, Rico Swanson, George Tinsley, and Al Tucker.
- Sikma's no. 43 jersey was retired by the Seattle SuperSonics, one of only six players to be honored by the team.
- Sikma was member of the Division III 50th & 75th All-Anniversary Teams.
- Sikma was elected to the Naismith Basketball Hall of Fame in 2019.

== NBA career statistics ==
Legend
GP	Games played	GS	Games started	MPG	Minutes per game
FG%	Field goal percentage	3P%	3-point field goal percentage	FT%	Free throw percentage
RPG	Rebounds per game	APG	Assists per game	SPG	Steals per game
BPG	Blocks per game	PPG	Points per game	**Bold**	Career high
†	Won an NBA championship	*	Led the league

=== Regular season ===
Year	Team	GP	GS	MPG	FG%	3P%	FT%	RPG	APG	SPG	BPG	PPG
1977–78	Seattle	**82**	–	27.3	.455	–	.777	8.3	1.6	0.8	0.5	10.7
1978–79†	Seattle	**82**	–	36.1	.460	–	.814	12.4	3.2	1.0	0.8	15.6
1979–80	Seattle	**82**	–	34.1	.475	.000	.805	11.1	3.4	0.8	0.9	14.3
1980–81	Seattle	**82**	–	35.6	.454	.000	.823	10.4	3.0	1.0	1.1	18.7
1981–82	Seattle	**82**	**82**	**37.2**	.479	.154	.855	**12.7**	3.4	**1.2**	**1.3**	**19.6**
1982–83	Seattle	75	71	34.2	.464	.000	.837	11.4	3.1	**1.2**	0.9	18.2
1983–84	Seattle	**82**	**82**	36.5	**.499**	.000	.856	11.1	4.0	**1.2**	1.1	19.1
1984–85	Seattle	68	68	35.3	.489	.200	.852	10.6	**4.2**	**1.2**	**1.3**	18.5
1985–86	Seattle	80	78	34.9	.462	.000	.864	9.4	3.8	**1.2**	0.9	17.1
1986–87	Milwaukee	**82**	**82**	30.9	.463	.000	.847	10.0	2.5	1.1	1.1	12.7
1987–88	Milwaukee	**82**	**82**	35.6	.486	.214	**.922***	8.6	3.4	1.1	1.0	16.5
1988–89	Milwaukee	80	80	32.3	.431	**.380**	.905	7.8	3.6	1.1	0.8	13.4
1989–90	Milwaukee	71	70	31.7	.416	.342	.885	6.9	3.2	1.1	0.7	13.9
1990–91	Milwaukee	77	44	25.2	.427	.341	.843	5.7	1.9	0.8	0.8	10.4
Career		1,107	739	33.4	.464	.328	.849	9.8	3.2	1.0	0.9	15.6
All-Star		7	0	21.0	.471	.000	.875	6.0	1.6	1.3	1.0	7

=== Playoffs ===
Year	Team	GP	GS	MPG	FG%	3P%	FT%	RPG	APG	SPG	BPG	PPG
1978	Seattle	**22**	–	31.9	.466	–	.780	8.1	1.2	0.8	0.5	13.7
1979†	Seattle	17	–	38.5	.455	–	.787	11.7	2.5	0.9	**1.4**	14.8
1980	Seattle	15	–	35.6	.399	.000	.852	8.4	3.7	1.1	0.3	11.7
1982	Seattle	8	–	**39.4**	.445	–	.862	12.1	3.0	1.1	1.0	20.5
1983	Seattle	2	–	37.5	.355	.000	.667	**13.0**	**5.5**	1.0	1.0	15.0
1984	Seattle	5	–	38.6	**.500**	.000	.857	10.2	1.0	0.6	**1.4**	**22.0**
1987	Milwaukee	12	**12**	35.5	.487	.000	**.980**	10.8	1.9	1.3	0.8	16.2
1988	Milwaukee	5	5	38.0	.461	.000	.833	12.4	2.6	0.4	0.8	19.0
1989	Milwaukee	9	9	33.4	.394	.286	.821	5.6	3.3	0.9	0.4	11.7
1990	Milwaukee	4	4	29.3	.261	.286	.750	3.5	1.8	0.5	1.0	5.0
1991	Milwaukee	3	0	17.0	.400	**.500**	.500	4.0	2.0	**1.7**	0.3	4.7
Career		102	30	34.9	.445	.244	.830	9.3	2.4	1.0	0.8	14.3

== See also ==
- List of NBA career rebounding leaders
- List of NBA career personal fouls leaders
- List of NBA single-game steals leaders
