= 1974–75 Milwaukee Bucks season =

NBA professional basketball team season

- Head coach: Larry Costello
- President: John Steinmiller (vice)
- General manager: Wayne Embry
- Owners: Milwaukee Professional Sports and Services, Inc. (Milwaukee Pro)
- Arena: MECCA Arena

Results
- Record: 38–44 (.463)
- Place: Division: 4th (Midwest); Conference: 7th (Western)
- Playoff finish: Did not qualify
- Stats at Basketball Reference

The 1974–75 Milwaukee Bucks season was the Bucks' seventh season in the NBA. Before the season began for the Bucks, they would join the Kansas City-Omaha Kings as the only two NBA teams to not have any players of theirs selected by any of the rivaling ABA teams in the 1974 ABA Draft of NBA Players. For the first time since 1969-70 season, Oscar Robertson was not on the opening day roster. This would be Kareem Abdul-Jabbar's last season in Milwaukee before being traded to the Los Angeles Lakers the following the season.

Just before the start of the regular season, Kareem had privately requested a trade on October 3, 1974, at a dinner meeting in Downtown Milwaukee. His preferred trade destinations were the New York Knicks and the Los Angeles Lakers. General manager Wayne Embry later stated in 1987, "We asked Kareem if there was dissatisfaction with us and he said, 'no'. He just wanted to be traded from Milwaukee. He said his life style and the life style in Milwaukee were not compatible." With the Knicks failing to trade for Kareem in the 1975 offseason, the Lakers then traded for Kareem on June 16, 1975, in a trade that also sent Walt Wesley to the Lakers and Junior Bridgeman, Dave Meyers, Elmore Smith, and Brian Winters to the Bucks.

== Draft picks ==
Round	Pick	Player	Position	Nationality	College
1	18	Gary Brokaw	SG	United States	Notre Dame
3	54	Greg McDougald		United States	Oral Roberts
4	72	Lionel Billingy	F/C	United States	Duquesne
5	90	John Johnson	SF	United States	Denver
6	108	Larry Williams		United States	Kansas State
7	126	Bob Hornstein		United States	West Virginia
8	144	Ralph Palamar		United States	Cameron
9	161	Mike Deane		United States	SUNY Potsdam
10	178	Bruce Featherston		United States	Texas State

== Roster ==
1974–75 Milwaukee Bucks roster
Players

Pos.	No.	Player	Height	Weight	DOB	From
C	33	Kareem Abdul-Jabbar	7 ft 2 in (2.18 m)	225 lb (102 kg)	1947–04–16	UCLA
G	25	Gary Brokaw	6 ft 4 in (1.93 m)	178 lb (81 kg)	1954–01–11	Notre Dame
F	10	Bob Dandridge	6 ft 6 in (1.98 m)	195 lb (88 kg)	1947–11–15	Norfolk State
G	20	Mickey Davis	6 ft 7 in (2.01 m)	195 lb (88 kg)	1950–06–16	Duquesne
F	11	Steve Kuberski	6 ft 8 in (2.03 m)	215 lb (98 kg)	1947–11–06	Bradley
G	14	Jon McGlocklin	6 ft 5 in (1.96 m)	205 lb (93 kg)	1943–06–10	Indiana
G	15	Jim Price (injured)	6 ft 3 in (1.91 m)	195 lb (88 kg)	1949–11–27	Louisville
F	18	Kevin Restani	6 ft 9 in (2.06 m)	225 lb (102 kg)	1951–12–23	San Francisco
G	24	George Thompson	6 ft 2 in (1.88 m)	200 lb (91 kg)	1947–11–29	Marquette
C	35	Cornell Warner	6 ft 9 in (2.06 m)	220 lb (100 kg)	1948–08–12	Jackson State
C	21	Walt Wesley	6 ft 11 in (2.11 m)	220 lb (100 kg)	1945–01–25	Kansas
G	12	Ron Williams	6 ft 3 in (1.91 m)	188 lb (85 kg)	1944–09–24	West Virginia

Coaches
Head coach
- Larry Costello
Assistant(s)
- Jack McKinney

Legend
- (DP) Unsigned draft pick
- (FA) Free agent
- (S) Suspended
- Injured

== Regular season ==
With the retirement of Oscar Robertson, the Bucks started the season 1–13 before slowly coming back and after 48 games they were 24-24 and were poised for their 6th straight trip to the postseason, but the Bucks faded down the stretch and missed the playoffs for the first time since their inaugural season in 1968–69.

=== Season standings ===
Midwest Division	W	L	PCT	GB	Home	Road	Div
y-Chicago Bulls	47	35	.573	–	29–12	18–23	11–15
x-Kansas City–Omaha Kings	44	38	.537	3	29–12	15–26	17–9
x-Detroit Pistons	40	42	.488	7	26–15	14–27	10–16
Milwaukee Bucks	38	44	.463	9	25–16	13–28	14–12

#	Western Conference				
#	Team	W	L	PCT	GB
1	z-Golden State Warriors	48	34	.585	–
2	y-Chicago Bulls	47	35	.573	1
3	x-Kansas City–Omaha Kings	44	38	.537	4
4	x-Seattle SuperSonics	43	39	.524	5
5	x-Detroit Pistons	40	42	.488	8
6	Portland Trail Blazers	38	44	.463	10
6	Milwaukee Bucks	38	44	.463	10
8	Phoenix Suns	32	50	.390	16
9	Los Angeles Lakers	30	52	.366	18

z – clinched division title
y – clinched division title
x – clinched playoff spot

=== Season schedule ===
1974–75 game log
Total: 38–44 (home: 25–16; road: 13–28)
October: 1–5 (home: 1–2; road: 0–3)

Game	Date	Team	Score	High points	High rebounds	High assists	Location Attendance	Record
1	October 18	Houston	106–101	Bob Dandridge (27)	Cornell Warner (13)	Dandridge, Warner (6)	MECCA Arena; 10,575	0–1
2	October 19	@ Chicago	70–87	Bob Dandridge (13)	Kevin Restani (8)	Lucius Allen (5)	Chicago Stadium; 9,031	0–2
3	October 22	Chicago	90–92	Bob Dandridge (28)	Bob Dandridge (8)	Lucius Allen (7)	MECCA Arena; 9,439	1–2
4	October 25	Washington	111–96	Lucius Allen (21)	Cornell Warner (16)	George Thompson (5)	MECCA Arena; 10,938	1–3
5	October 26	@ Washington	95–101	Lucius Allen (23)	Kevin Restani (11)	Lucius Allen (9)	Capital Centre; 7,166	1–4
6	October 30	@ Kansas City–Omaha	97–99	Lucius Allen (23)	Cornell Warner (13)	Allen, McGlocklin (5)	Kemper Arena; 5,241	1–5

November: 5–9 (home: 3–4; road: 2–5)

Game	Date	Team	Score	High points	High rebounds	High assists	Location Attendance	Record
7	November 1	@ Los Angeles	86–109	Lucius Allen (21)	Kevin Restani (9)	Lucius Allen (6)	The Forum; 12,219	1–6
8	November 2	@ Golden State	90–99	George Thompson (24)	Cornell Warner (20)	George Thompson (6)	Oakland-Alameda County Coliseum Arena; 7,570	1–7
9	November 3	@ Seattle	89–101	Bob Dandridge (18)	Cornell Warner (17)	Allen, Restani (6)	Seattle Center Coliseum; 11,839	1–8
10	November 7	@ Houston	93–103	Bob Dandridge (23)	Cornell Warner (10)	Allen, Thompson (3)	Hofheinz Pavilion; 3,184	1–9
11	November 10	Atlanta	99–94	Dandridge, Price (22)	Cornell Warner (20)	Jim Price (8)	MECCA Arena; 10,189	1–10
12	November 12	Boston	91–83	Bob Dandridge (24)	Kevin Restani (17)	Dandridge, McGlocklin, Restani (4)	MECCA Arena; 9,919	1–11
13	November 13	@ Detroit	91–98	Bob Dandridge (28)	Dandridge, Restani (12)	Bob Dandridge (6)	Cobo Arena; 4,994	1–12
14	November 16	Cleveland	92–89	Bob Dandridge (21)	Cornell Warner (14)	Dandridge, Price, Restani (4)	MECCA Arena; 10,938	1–13
15	November 19	Phoenix	108–122	Jim Price (43)	Cornell Warner (9)	Davis, Price, Restani (6)	MECCA Arena; 9,187	2–13
16	November 21	@ Kansas City–Omaha	106–96	Bob Dandridge (28)	Cornell Warner (19)	Cornell Warner (7)	Kemper Arena; 5,516	3–13
17	November 23	@ New York	90–72	Bob Dandridge (25)	Kevin Restani (14)	Price, Thompson (5)	Madison Square Garden; 19,694	4–13
18	November 26	Los Angeles	105–102	Kareem Abdul-Jabbar (36)	Kareem Abdul-Jabbar (18)	Jim Price (8)	MECCA Arena; 10,938	4–14
19	November 29	Kansas City–Omaha	99–102	Kareem Abdul-Jabbar (37)	Kareem Abdul-Jabbar (14)	Abdul-Jabbar, McGlocklin (8)	MECCA Arena; 10,938	5–14
20	November 30	Chicago	99–101 (2OT)	Kareem Abdul-Jabbar (28)	Abdul-Jabbar, Warner (13)	Jim Price (7)	MECCA Arena; 10,938	6–14

December: 8–5 (home: 5–3; road: 3–2)

Game	Date	Team	Score	High points	High rebounds	High assists	Location Attendance	Record
21	December 1	Philadelphia	112–117	Kareem Abdul-Jabbar (35)	Kareem Abdul-Jabbar (17)	Jim Price (8)	MECCA Arena; 5,032	7–14
22	December 3	@ Buffalo	110–101	Kareem Abdul-Jabbar (36)	Abdul-Jabbar, Warner (12)	Kareem Abdul-Jabbar (7)	Buffalo Memorial Auditorium; 8,585	8–14
23	December 4	Seattle	112–103	Kareem Abdul-Jabbar (22)	Kareem Abdul-Jabbar (15)	Jim Price (9)	MECCA Arena; 10,497	8–15
24	December 6	@ Chicago	99–96	Bob Dandridge (28)	Kareem Abdul-Jabbar (18)	Jim Price (8)	Chicago Stadium; 17,107	9–15
25	December 10	Detroit	82–90	Kareem Abdul-Jabbar (23)	Dandridge, Restani (10)	George Thompson (8)	MECCA Arena; 9,625	10–15
26	December 12	Kansas City–Omaha	113–105	Bob Dandridge (32)	Kareem Abdul-Jabbar (13)	Jim Price (8)	MECCA Arena; 10,938	10–16
27	December 13	@ Philadelphia	89–93 (OT)	Kareem Abdul-Jabbar (26)	Kareem Abdul-Jabbar (16)	Jim Price (10)	The Spectrum; 6,446	10–17
28	December 17	@ Portland	103–119	Kareem Abdul-Jabbar (23)	Kareem Abdul-Jabbar (19)	Jim Price (6)	Memorial Coliseum; 11,878	10–18
29	December 19	@ Phoenix	112–108	Kareem Abdul-Jabbar (28)	Kareem Abdul-Jabbar (10)	Jim Price (9)	Arizona Veterans Memorial Coliseum; 7,369	11–18
30	December 22	New Orleans	76–96	Kareem Abdul-Jabbar (23)	Cornell Warner (12)	Jim Price (5)	MECCA Arena; 9,038	12–18
31	December 23	Washington	106–103 (OT)	Bob Dandridge (28)	Kareem Abdul-Jabbar (18)	Jim Price (8)	MECCA Arena; 10,938	12–19
32	December 29	New York	89–115	Bob Dandridge (31)	Kareem Abdul-Jabbar (14)	Bob Dandridge (5)	MECCA Arena; 10,938	13–19
33	December 30	Buffalo	91–106	Kareem Abdul-Jabbar (31)	Kareem Abdul-Jabbar (23)	Abdul-Jabbar, McGlocklin (7)	MECCA Arena; 10,938	14–19

January: 10–5 (home: 6–1; road: 4–4)

Game	Date	Team	Score	High points	High rebounds	High assists	Location Attendance	Record
34	January 2	Atlanta	111–116	Kareem Abdul-Jabbar (52)	Cornell Warner (19)	Jon McGlocklin (8)	MECCA Arena; 10,938	15–19
35	January 4	Houston	89–93	Kareem Abdul-Jabbar (37)	Cornell Warner (12)	Jim Price (7)	MECCA Arena; 10,938	16–19
36	January 5	Chicago	95–96	Abdul-Jabbar, Dandridge (33)	Kareem Abdul-Jabbar (15)	Ron Williams (8)	MECCA Arena; 10,938	17–19
37	January 7	@ Kansas City–Omaha	99–108	Kareem Abdul-Jabbar (39)	Kareem Abdul-Jabbar (14)	Kareem Abdul-Jabbar (9)	Kemper Arena; 6,506	17–20
38	January 8	@ Detroit	102–92	Bob Dandridge (32)	Kareem Abdul-Jabbar (19)	Jim Price (9)	Cobo Arena; 11,388	18–20
39	January 10	Detroit	89–81	Kareem Abdul-Jabbar (22)	Cornell Warner (14)	Abdul-Jabbar, Price (4)	MECCA Arena; 10,938	18–21
40	January 11	@ Cleveland	91–81	Kareem Abdul-Jabbar (32)	Kareem Abdul-Jabbar (18)	Jim Price (7)	Richfield Coliseum; 14,314	19–21
41	January 12	Philadelphia	88–99	Kareem Abdul-Jabbar (29)	Kareem Abdul-Jabbar (14)	Jon McGlocklin (5)	MECCA Arena; 10,647	20–21
42	January 16	Golden State	100–119	Kareem Abdul-Jabbar (40)	Abdul-Jabbar, Warner (13)	Jon McGlocklin (8)	MECCA Arena; 10,089	21–21
43	January 19	Portland	108–122	Kareem Abdul-Jabbar (50)	Kareem Abdul-Jabbar (15)	Kareem Abdul-Jabbar (11)	MECCA Arena; 10,938	22–21
44	January 24	@ Houston	91–95	Kareem Abdul-Jabbar (29)	Kareem Abdul-Jabbar (14)	Bob Dandridge (8)	Hofheinz Pavilion; 8,194	22–22
45	January 25	@ Atlanta	101–117	Kareem Abdul-Jabbar (22)	Cornell Warner (16)	Kareem Abdul-Jabbar (5)	Omni Coliseum; 12,685	22–23
46	January 27	@ New Orleans	117–115	Kareem Abdul-Jabbar (41)	Cornell Warner (16)	Ron Williams (8)	Loyola Field House; 6,419	23–23
47	January 29	@ Kansas City–Omaha	102–106	Kareem Abdul-Jabbar (43)	Kareem Abdul-Jabbar (16)	Abdul-Jabbar, Dandridge, McGlocklin, Price (4)	Omaha Civic Auditorium; 9,185	23–24
48	January 31	@ Philadelphia	101–97	Kareem Abdul-Jabbar (28)	Kareem Abdul-Jabbar (19)	Jim Price (9)	The Spectrum; 10,110	24–24

February: 4–10 (home: 3–3; road: 1–7)

Game	Date	Team	Score	High points	High rebounds	High assists	Location Attendance	Record
49	February 2	@ Boston	102–120	Kareem Abdul-Jabbar (23)	Cornell Warner (14)	Gary Brokaw (6)	Boston Garden; 15,320	24–25
50	February 5	Boston	92–90	Kareem Abdul-Jabbar (29)	Kareem Abdul-Jabbar (22)	Kareem Abdul-Jabbar (4)	MECCA Arena; 10,938	24–26
51	February 6	Kansas City–Omaha	95–94	Bob Dandridge (28)	Cornell Warner (15)	George Thompson (8)	Dane County Coliseum; 8,108	24–27
52	February 7	New Orleans	98–119	Kareem Abdul-Jabbar (35)	Kareem Abdul-Jabbar (18)	Gary Brokaw (8)	MECCA Arena; 10,938	25–27
53	February 10	Detroit	109–130	Kareem Abdul-Jabbar (39)	Abdul-Jabbar, Warner (11)	Kareem Abdul-Jabbar (7)	MECCA Arena; 10,309	26–27
54	February 12	@ Washington	108–112 (OT)	Kareem Abdul-Jabbar (28)	Abdul-Jabbar, Warner (14)	Gary Brokaw (5)	Capital Centre; 15,331	26–28
55	February 14	Cleveland	105–112	Kareem Abdul-Jabbar (32)	Cornell Warner (18)	Abdul-Jabbar, Brokaw (6)	MECCA Arena; 10,938	27–28
56	February 16	@ New Orleans	101–103	Kareem Abdul-Jabbar (33)	Kareem Abdul-Jabbar (14)	Jim Price (4)	Municipal Auditorium; 7,435	27–29
57	February 18	@ Cleveland	104–93	Gary Brokaw (24)	Cornell Warner (16)	Kareem Abdul-Jabbar (5)	Richfield Coliseum; 13,052	28–29
58	February 21	@ Chicago	85–96	Abdul-Jabbar, Brokaw (20)	Kareem Abdul-Jabbar (14)	Kareem Abdul-Jabbar (7)	Chicago Stadium; 19,549	28–30
59	February 23	Phoenix	106–97	Kareem Abdul-Jabbar (28)	Kareem Abdul-Jabbar (24)	Gary Brokaw (9)	Dane County Coliseum; 8,832	28–31
60	February 25	@ Kansas City–Omaha	90–93	Kareem Abdul-Jabbar (27)	Cornell Warner (13)	Brokaw, Dandridge (4)	Kemper Arena; 11,762	28–32
61	February 26	@ Detroit	84–104	Kareem Abdul-Jabbar (21)	Bob Dandridge (11)	Gary Brokaw (5)	Cobo Arena; 10,190	28–33
62	February 28	@ Boston	106–107	Kareem Abdul-Jabbar (40)	Kareem Abdul-Jabbar (11)	George Thompson (8)	Boston Garden; 15,320	28–34

March: 7–9 (home: 5–2; road: 2–7)

Game	Date	Team	Score	High points	High rebounds	High assists	Location Attendance	Record
63	March 1	Buffalo	100–104	Kareem Abdul-Jabbar (34)	Kareem Abdul-Jabbar (18)	George Thompson (9)	MECCA Arena; 10,938	29–34
64	March 4	Detroit	83–101	Kareem Abdul-Jabbar (27)	Cornell Warner (17)	Dandridge, Thompson, Warner (5)	MECCA Arena; 10,575	30–34
65	March 6	Seattle	92–102	Kareem Abdul-Jabbar (26)	Cornell Warner (13)	Abdul-Jabbar, Brokaw (7)	MECCA Arena; 10,938	31–34
66	March 8	@ Buffalo	95–110	Kareem Abdul-Jabbar (27)	Cornell Warner (15)	George Thompson (8)	Buffalo Memorial Auditorium; 15,124	31–35
67	March 10	Kansas City–Omaha	96–103	Kareem Abdul-Jabbar (34)	Kareem Abdul-Jabbar (12)	McGlocklin, Thompson (7)	MECCA Arena; 10,938	32–35
68	March 11	Golden State	107–90	Kareem Abdul-Jabbar (18)	Walt Wesley (8)	Jon McGlocklin (7)	MECCA Arena; 10,687	32–36
69	March 13	@ Atlanta	120–104	Kareem Abdul-Jabbar (41)	Kareem Abdul-Jabbar (19)	Jon McGlocklin (5)	Omni Coliseum; 5,294	33–36
70	March 14	Los Angeles	105–104	Kareem Abdul-Jabbar (29)	Kareem Abdul-Jabbar (17)	Gary Brokaw (11)	MECCA Arena; 10,938	33–37
71	March 16	@ Chicago	103–90	Kareem Abdul-Jabbar (32)	Kareem Abdul-Jabbar (15)	Jon McGlocklin (11)	Chicago Stadium; 18,222	34–37
72	March 18	@ Portland	89–95	Kareem Abdul-Jabbar (28)	Bob Dandridge (14)	Jon McGlocklin (8)	Memorial Coliseum; 11,846	34–38
73	March 19	@ Seattle	100–101	Dandridge, Thompson (24)	Dandridge, Restani (11)	Jon McGlocklin (7)	Seattle Center Coliseum; 14,082	34–39
74	March 22	@ Golden State	117–133	Kareem Abdul-Jabbar (22)	Kareem Abdul-Jabbar (12)	Ron Williams (7)	Oakland-Alameda County Coliseum Arena; 12,787	34–40
75	March 23	@ Los Angeles	97–116	Kareem Abdul-Jabbar (22)	Kareem Abdul-Jabbar (14)	Brokaw, McGlocklin (7)	The Forum; 14,121	34–41
76	March 25	@ Phoenix	87–92	Kareem Abdul-Jabbar (34)	Kareem Abdul-Jabbar (21)	George Thompson (5)	Arizona Veterans Memorial Coliseum; 7,232	34–42
77	March 28	Portland	105–128	Kareem Abdul-Jabbar (38)	Kareem Abdul-Jabbar (17)	Abdul-Jabbar, Brokaw (6)	MECCA Arena; 10,938	35–42
78	March 30	@ New York	99–111	Kareem Abdul-Jabbar (32)	Kareem Abdul-Jabbar (11)	Jon McGlocklin (7)	Madison Square Garden; 19,694	35–43

April: 3–1 (home: 2–1; road: 1–0)

Game	Date	Team	Score	High points	High rebounds	High assists	Location Attendance	Record
79	April 1	Detroit	91–98	Kareem Abdul-Jabbar (27)	Cornell Warner (16)	Dandridge, McGlocklin (6)	MECCA Arena; 10,021	36–43
80	April 4	New York	101–109	Kareem Abdul-Jabbar (33)	Kareem Abdul-Jabbar (19)	Gary Brokaw (8)	MECCA Arena; 10,938	37–43
81	April 5	@ Detroit	119–106	Kareem Abdul-Jabbar (28)	Kareem Abdul-Jabbar (20)	Mickey Davis (6)	Cobo Arena; 9,107	38–43
82	April 6	Chicago	112–100	Kareem Abdul-Jabbar (34)	Bob Dandridge (13)	Jon McGlocklin (5)	MECCA Arena; 10,938	38–44

Source: www.basketball-reference.com

== Playoffs ==
The Milwaukee Bucks failed to qualify for the playoffs for the first since 1968-69 season.

== Player statistics ==
Legend
GP	Games played	GS	Games started	MPG	Minutes per game
FG%	Field-goal percentage	3P%	3-point field-goal percentage	FT%	Free-throw percentage
RPG	Rebounds per game	APG	Assists per game	SPG	Steals per game
BPG	Blocks per game	PPG	Points per game

Player Statistics
Player	GP	GS	MPG	FG%	3FG%	FT%	RPG	APG	SPG	BPG	PPG
Kareem Abdul-Jabbar	65		42.3	51.3		76.3	14.0	4.1	1.0	3.3	30.0
Bob Dandridge	80		37.9	47.3		80.5	6.9	3.0	1.5	0.6	19.9
Lucius Allen	10		34.2	41.5		83.8	3.1	5.3	1.4	0.1	16.7
Jim Price	41		37.3	44.0		85.9	3.8	5.4	2.2	0.5	14.9
George Thompson	73		27.2	44.3		78.5	2.5	3.1	0.9	0.1	10.7
Jon McGlocklin	79		23.5	49.6		87.5	1.5	3.2	0.6	0.1	9.0
Gary Brokaw	73		22.5	45.5		68.5	2.0	3.0	0.4	0.2	8.1
Cornell Warner	79		31.9	45.8		68.4	10.3	1.6	0.6	0.7	7.6
Mickey Davis	75		14.4	47.9		88.6	3.2	1.1	0.4	0.1	5.7
Kevin Restani	76		23.1	44.0		71.4	5.3	1.6	0.5	0.3	5.4
Ron Williams	46		11.4	37.6		82.8	0.9	1.5	0.5	0.0	3.2
Steve Kuberski	59		8.8	39.0		78.6	2.1	0.6	0.2	0.1	2.8
Walt Wesley	41		5.2	44.0		60.9	1.3	0.3	0.2	0.1	2.1
Terry Driscoll	11		4.7	23.1		50.0	1.5	0.3	0.1	0.0	0.6
Bob Rule	1		11.0	0.0		0.0	0.0	2.0	0.0	0.0	0.0
Dick Cunningham	2		4.0	0.0		0.0	1.0	0.5	0.0	0.0	0.0

== Awards and records ==
- Kareem Abdul-Jabbar, NBA All-Defensive First Team

== Transactions ==
=== Trades ===
October 8, 1974

November 8, 1974

To Milwaukee Bucks----
- Steve Kuberski
To Milwaukee Bucks----
- Jim Price
To New Orleans Jazz----
- Russ Lee
To Los Angeles Lakers----
- Lucius Allen

=== Free agents ===
Player	Signed	Former team
Bob Rule	July 7, 1974	Cleveland Cavaliers
Walt Wesley	November 27, 1974	Washington Bullets

Subtractions
Player	Date signed	New team
Curtis Perry	Expansion Draft May 20, 1974	New Orleans Jazz
Terry Driscoll	November 27, 1974	N/A
