= 1980 NBA playoffs =

Postseason tournament

Tournament details
- Dates: April 2–May 16, 1980
- Season: 1979–80
- Teams: 12

Final positions
- Champions: Los Angeles Lakers (7th title)
- Runners-up: Philadelphia 76ers
- Semifinalists: Seattle SuperSonics; Boston Celtics

Tournament statistics
- Scoring leader(s): Kareem Abdul-Jabbar (Lakers) (31.9 PPG)

Awards
- MVP: Magic Johnson (Lakers)

The 1980 NBA playoffs were the postseason tournament of the National Basketball Association's 1979–80 season. The tournament concluded with the Western Conference champion Los Angeles Lakers defeating the Eastern Conference champion Philadelphia 76ers 4 games to 2 in the NBA Finals. The Lakers earned their seventh NBA title, their second since moving from Minneapolis.

Magic Johnson became the first and (as of 2026), only rookie to be named NBA Finals MVP, leading L.A. to a clinching Game 6 victory with 42 points, 15 rebounds and 7 assists. With center Kareem Abdul-Jabbar out with a severely sprained ankle, Johnson started at center instead, and ultimately played all five positions on the court in the game.

Philadelphia earned their third Eastern Conference championship, but were unsuccessful in capturing their third NBA title.

The Milwaukee Bucks appeared in the playoffs for the last time as a member of the West; the Houston Rockets and San Antonio Spurs likewise appeared for the last time playing for the East. They switched conferences (along with the Chicago Bulls) in the 1980–81 season with the addition of the Dallas Mavericks. The Bucks made the playoffs for the first time since 1978, starting a string of twelve consecutive appearances that included three Conference Finals appearances (1983, 1984, and 1986) and seven consecutive division titles (1980–1986). They did not miss the playoffs again until 1992.

== Bracket ==
First Round
E4	Houston	2
E5	San Antonio	1
E3	Philadelphia	2
E6	Washington	0
W4	Phoenix	2
W5	Kansas City	1
W3	Seattle	2
W6	Portland	1

Conference Semifinals
E1	Boston*	4
E4	Houston	0
Eastern Conference
E3	Philadelphia	4
E2	Atlanta*	1
W1	Los Angeles*	4
W4	Phoenix	1
Western Conference
W3	Seattle	4
W2	Milwaukee*	3

Conference Finals
E1	Boston*	1
E3	Philadelphia	4
W1	Los Angeles*	4
W3	Seattle	1

NBA Finals
E3	Philadelphia	2
W1	Los Angeles*	4

- * Division winner
- Bold Series winner
- Italic Team with home-court advantage

== First round ==
=== Eastern Conference first round ===
==== (3) Philadelphia 76ers vs. (6) Washington Bullets ====
April 2

Boxscore

Washington Bullets 96, Philadelphia 76ers 111
Scoring by quarter: 24–25, 21–31, 24–23, 27–32
Pts: Kevin Grevey 34; Rebs: Wes Unseld 18; Asts: Kevin Porter 7	Pts: Lionel Hollins 21; Rebs: Caldwell Jones 26; Asts: Maurice Cheeks 6
Philadelphia leads series, 1–0

Spectrum, Philadelphia, Pennsylvania
Attendance: 12,567

April 4

Boxscore

Philadelphia 76ers 112, Washington Bullets 104
Scoring by quarter: 31–20, 33–26, 21–24, 27–34
Pts: Julius Erving 31; Rebs: Lionel Hollins 9 Asts: Maurice Cheeks 7	Pts: Elvin Hayes 26; Rebs: Elvin Hayes 12; Asts: Kevin Grevey 5
Philadelphia wins series, 2–0

Capital Centre, Landover, Maryland
Attendance: 18,397

Regular-season series
Philadelphia won 5–1 in the regular-season series

October 12, 1979

Recap

Philadelphia 76ers 93, Washington Bullets 92

Capital Centre, Landover, Maryland

November 28, 1979

Recap

Washington Bullets 102, Philadelphia 76ers 120

Spectrum, Philadelphia

December 25, 1979

Recap

Philadelphia 76ers 95, Washington Bullets 92

Capital Centre, Landover, Maryland

January 11, 1980

Recap

Washington Bullets 106, Philadelphia 76ers 119

Spectrum, Philadelphia

March 12, 1980

Recap

Washington Bullets 98, Philadelphia 76ers 105

Spectrum, Philadelphia

March 20, 1980

Recap

Philadelphia 76ers 113, Washington Bullets 119 (OT)

Capital Centre, Landover, Maryland

This was the third playoff meeting between these two teams, with the Bullets winning the first two meetings.

Previous playoff series
Washington leads 2–0 in all-time playoff series

1971

Philadelphia 76ers 3, Baltimore Bullets 4

1971 Eastern Conference Semifinals

1978

Philadelphia 76ers 2, Washington Bullets 4

1978 Eastern Conference Finals

==== (4) Houston Rockets vs. (5) San Antonio Spurs ====
The Rockets gained home-court advantage due to a better record within the Central Division (20–10 to the Spurs' 14–16). Both teams had 41-41 records and split their season series 3-3.

April 2

Boxscore

San Antonio Spurs 85, Houston Rockets 95
Scoring by quarter: 25–19, 26–23, 11–24, 23–29
Pts: George Gervin 19; Rebs: Gervin, Kenon 9 each Asts: Gervin, Olberding 4 each	Pts: Calvin Murphy 28; Rebs: Moses Malone 14; Asts: Tom Henderson 8
Houston leads series, 1–0

The Summit, Houston, Texas
Attendance: 14,454

April 4

Boxscore

Houston Rockets 101, San Antonio Spurs 106
Scoring by quarter: 26–22, 22–27, 26–24, 27–33
Pts: Moses Malone 34; Rebs: Moses Malone 19; Asts: Tom Henderson 10	Pts: George Gervin 44; Rebs: Mark Olberding 12; Asts: Mike Gale 9
Series tied, 1–1

HemisFair Arena, San Antonio, Texas
Attendance: 12,894

April 6

Boxscore

San Antonio Spurs 120, Houston Rockets 141
Scoring by quarter: 26–31, 28–27, 27–45, 39–38
Pts: George Gervin 37; Rebs: John Shumate 8 Asts: George Gervin 6	Pts: Moses Malone 37; Rebs: Moses Malone 20; Asts: Tom Henderson 10
Houston wins series, 2–1

The Summit, Houston, Texas
Attendance: 15,676

Regular-season series
Tied 3–3 in the regular-season series

Saturday, December 8, 1979

Recap

Houston Rockets 129, San Antonio Spurs 138

HemisFair Arena, San Antonio

Wednesday, December 26, 1979

Recap

San Antonio Spurs 110, Houston Rockets 143

The Summit, Houston

Wednesday, January 30, 1980

Recap

San Antonio Spurs 118, Houston Rockets 111

The Summit, Houston

Tuesday, February 12, 1980

Recap

Houston Rockets 120, San Antonio Spurs 118

HemisFair Arena, San Antonio

Tuesday, March 25, 1980

Recap

Houston Rockets 107, San Antonio Spurs 126

HemisFair Arena, San Antonio

Wednesday, March 26, 1980

Recap

San Antonio Spurs 101, Houston Rockets 113

The Summit, Houston

This was the first playoff meeting between the Rockets and the Spurs. Additionally, this was the first NBA playoff series between teams from Texas.

=== Western Conference first round ===
==== (3) Seattle SuperSonics vs. (6) Portland Trail Blazers ====
April 2

Boxscore

Portland Trail Blazers 110, Seattle SuperSonics 120
Scoring by quarter: 25–30, 27–28, 33–37, 25–25
Pts: Ron Brewer 24; Rebs: Kermit Washington 7 Asts: Kermit Washington 12	Pts: Gus Williams 35; Rebs: three players 8 each Asts: Gus Williams 6
Seattle leads series, 1–0

Kingdome, Seattle, Washington
Attendance: 26,412

April 4

Boxscore

Seattle SuperSonics 95, Portland Trail Blazers 105 (OT)
Scoring by quarter: 24–21, 26–26, 24–27, 15–15, Overtime: 6–16
Pts: Dennis Johnson 24; Rebs: Lonnie Shelton 12; Asts: Gus Williams 8	Pts: Natt, R. Brewer 27 each Rebs: Jim Brewer 12; Asts: T. R. Dunn 4
Series tied, 1–1

Memorial Coliseum, Portland, Oregon
Attendance: 12,666

April 6

Boxscore

Portland Trail Blazers 86, Seattle SuperSonics 103
Scoring by quarter: 21–24, 21–33, 23–23, 21–23
Pts: Billy Ray Bates 26; Rebs: Tom Owens 16; Asts: Billy Ray Bates 3	Pts: Gus Williams 21; Rebs: John Johnson 8 Asts: Williams, D. Johnson 6 each
Seattle wins series, 2–1

Kingdome, Seattle, Washington
Attendance: 23,546

Regular-season series
Seattle won 5–1 in the regular-season series

November 18, 1979

Recap

Seattle SuperSonics 95, Portland Trail Blazers 100

Memorial Coliseum, Portland, Oregon

November 23, 1979

Recap

Portland Trail Blazers 90, Seattle SuperSonics 94

Kingdome, Seattle

December 28, 1979

Recap

Portland Trail Blazers 97, Seattle SuperSonics 126

Kingdome, Seattle

December 30, 1979

Recap

Seattle SuperSonics 107, Portland Trail Blazers 100

Memorial Coliseum, Portland, Oregon

March 4, 1980

Recap

Seattle SuperSonics 98, Portland Trail Blazers 97

Memorial Coliseum, Portland, Oregon

March 30, 1980

Recap

Portland Trail Blazers 104, Seattle SuperSonics 135

Kingdome, Seattle

This was the second playoff meeting between these two teams, with the SuperSonics winning the first meeting.

Previous playoff series
Seattle leads 1–0 in all-time playoff series

1978

Portland Trail Blazers 2, Seattle SuperSonics 4

1978 Western Conference Semifinals

==== (4) Phoenix Suns vs. (5) Kansas City Kings ====
April 2

Boxscore

Kansas City Kings 93, Phoenix Suns 96
Scoring by quarter: 14–19, 18–22, 30–31, 31–24
Pts: Otis Birdsong 23; Rebs: Reggie King 10; Asts: Phil Ford 7	Pts: Paul Westphal 23; Rebs: Truck Robinson 14; Asts: Walter Davis 7
Phoenix leads series, 1–0

Arizona Veterans Memorial Coliseum, Phoenix, Arizona
Attendance: 12,660

April 4

Boxscore

Phoenix Suns 96, Kansas City Kings 106
Scoring by quarter: 20–33, 23–24, 30–17, 23–32
Pts: Alvan Adams 22; Rebs: Alvan Adams 12; Asts: Alvan Adams 7	Pts: Scott Wedman 32; Rebs: Scott Wedman 9 Asts: Phil Ford 13
Series tied, 1–1

Kemper Arena, Kansas City, Missouri
Attendance: 9,637

April 6

Boxscore

Kansas City Kings 99, Phoenix Suns 114
Scoring by quarter: 38–33, 19–33, 17–22, 25–26
Pts: Scott Wedman 24; Rebs: Reggie King 11; Asts: Phil Ford 6	Pts: Walter Davis 22; Rebs: Alvan Adams 20; Asts: Adams, Davis 7 each
Phoenix wins series, 2–1

Arizona Veterans Memorial Coliseum, Phoenix, Arizona
Attendance: 11,306

Regular-season series
Phoenix won 5–1 in the regular-season series

October 21, 1979

Recap

Phoenix Suns 85, Kansas City Kings 122

Kemper Arena, Kansas City, Missouri

November 21, 1979

Recap

Kansas City Kings 120, Phoenix Suns 128

Arizona Veterans Memorial Coliseum, Phoenix, Arizona

December 22, 1979

Recap

Phoenix Suns 115, Kansas City Kings 111

Kemper Arena, Kansas City, Missouri

December 28, 1979

Recap

Kansas City Kings 112, Phoenix Suns 118

Arizona Veterans Memorial Coliseum, Phoenix, Arizona

February 6, 1980

Recap

Kansas City Kings 95, Phoenix Suns 97

Arizona Veterans Memorial Coliseum, Phoenix, Arizona

March 18, 1980

Recap

Phoenix Suns 112, Kansas City Kings 109

Kemper Arena, Kansas City, Missouri

This was the second playoff meeting between these two teams, with the Suns winning the first meeting.

Previous playoff series
Phoenix leads 1–0 in all-time playoff series

1979

Phoenix Suns 4, Kansas City Kings 2

1979 Western Conference Semifinals

== Conference semifinals ==
=== Eastern Conference semifinals ===
==== (1) Boston Celtics vs. (4) Houston Rockets ====
April 9

Boxscore

Houston Rockets 101, Boston Celtics 119
Scoring by quarter: 23–39, 33–22, 22–23, 23–35
Pts: Moses Malone 27; Rebs: Moses Malone 13; Asts: three players 4 each	Pts: Chris Ford 19; Rebs: Cedric Maxwell 12; Asts: Tiny Archibald 9
Boston leads series, 1–0

Boston Garden, Boston, Massachusetts
Attendance: 15,320
Referees: Ed Rush, Bob Rakel, Joe Crawford

April 11

Boxscore

Houston Rockets 75, Boston Celtics 95
Scoring by quarter: 21–23, 22–23, 16–25, 16–24
Pts: Robert Reid 22; Rebs: Robert Reid 14; Asts: Robert Reid 4	Pts: Larry Bird 14; Rebs: Cedric Maxwell 10; Asts: Tiny Archibald 7
Boston leads series, 2–0

Boston Garden, Boston, Massachusetts
Attendance: 15,320

April 13

Boxscore

Boston Celtics 100, Houston Rockets 81
Scoring by quarter: 19–18, 26–19, 26–20, 29–24
Pts: Tiny Archibald 20; Rebs: Cedric Maxwell 12; Asts: Tiny Archibald 10	Pts: Moses Malone 28; Rebs: Moses Malone 9 Asts: Henderson, Leavell 5 each
Boston leads series, 3–0

The Summit, Houston, Texas
Attendance: 14,243
Referees: Jake O'Donnell, Hugh Evans, Bill Saar

April 14

Boxscore

Boston Celtics 138, Houston Rockets 121
Scoring by quarter: 39–29, 27–35, 32–21, 40–36
Pts: Larry Bird 34; Rebs: Larry Bird 10; Asts: Tiny Archibald 10	Pts: Moses Malone 28; Rebs: Moses Malone 15; Asts: Reid, Leavell 8 each
Boston wins series, 4–0

The Summit, Houston, Texas
Attendance: 13,106
Referees: Jack Madden, Wally Rooney

- Rick Barry's final NBA game.

Regular-season series
Boston won 6–0 in the regular-season series

October 12, 1979

Recap

Houston Rockets 106, Boston Celtics 114

Boston Garden, Boston

October 24, 1979

Recap

Boston Celtics 100, Houston Rockets 99

The Summit, Houston

January 2, 1980

Recap

Boston Celtics 111, Houston Rockets 103

The Summit, Houston

January 22, 1980

Recap

Houston Rockets 106, Boston Celtics 112

Boston Garden, Boston

March 5, 1980

Recap

Boston Celtics 103, Houston Rockets 99 (OT)

The Summit, Houston

March 12, 1980

Recap

Houston Rockets 105, Boston Celtics 121

Boston Garden, Boston

This was the second playoff meeting between these two teams, with the Celtics winning the first meeting.

Previous playoff series
Boston leads 1–0 in all-time playoff series

1975

Boston Celtics 4, Houston Rockets 1

1975 Eastern Conference Semifinals

==== (2) Atlanta Hawks vs. (3) Philadelphia 76ers ====
April 6

Boxscore

Atlanta Hawks 104, Philadelphia 76ers 107
Scoring by quarter: 30–28, 28–28, 17–20, 29–31
Pts: Eddie Johnson 26; Rebs: Dan Roundfield 13; Asts: Eddie Johnson 6	Pts: Julius Erving 28; Rebs: Caldwell Jones 13; Asts: Maurice Cheeks 9
Philadelphia leads series, 1–0

Spectrum, Philadelphia, Pennsylvania
Attendance: 10,561

April 9

Boxscore

Atlanta Hawks 92, Philadelphia 76ers 99
Scoring by quarter: 27–22, 19–27, 28–22, 18–28
Pts: Dan Roundfield 23; Rebs: Dan Roundfield 14; Asts: three players 3 each	Pts: Darryl Dawkins 22; Rebs: Bobby Jones 9 Asts: Maurice Cheeks 7
Philadelphia leads series, 2–0

Spectrum, Philadelphia, Pennsylvania
Attendance: 18,276

April 10

Boxscore

Philadelphia 76ers 93, Atlanta Hawks 105
Scoring by quarter: 21–23, 25–24, 27–28, 20–30
Pts: Julius Erving 26; Rebs: Caldwell Jones 16; Asts: Caldwell Jones 4	Pts: Eddie Johnson 19; Rebs: Tree Rollins 17; Asts: three players 6 each
Philadelphia leads series, 2–1

Omni Coliseum, Atlanta, Georgia
Attendance: 15,617

April 13

Boxscore

Philadelphia 76ers 107, Atlanta Hawks 83
Scoring by quarter: 24–26, 22–20, 35–17, 26–20
Pts: Hollins, B. Jones 20 each Rebs: Caldwell Jones 11; Asts: Maurice Cheeks 5	Pts: Dan Roundfield 17; Rebs: Dan Roundfield 12; Asts: three players 4 each
Philadelphia leads series, 3–1

Omni Coliseum, Atlanta, Georgia
Attendance: 15,617

April 15

Boxscore

Atlanta Hawks 100, Philadelphia 76ers 105
Scoring by quarter: 30–24, 23–19, 20–35, 27–27
Pts: John Drew 29; Rebs: Dan Roundfield 13; Asts: Charlie Criss 5	Pts: Dawkins, Erving 30 each Rebs: Caldwell Jones 13; Asts: Lionel Hollins 7
Philadelphia wins series, 4–1

Spectrum, Philadelphia, Pennsylvania
Attendance: 18,276
Referees: Earl Strom, Ed Middleton

Regular-season series
Atlanta won 4–2 in the regular-season series

October 31, 1979

Recap

Philadelphia 76ers 97, Atlanta Hawks 102

The Omni, Atlanta

November 2, 1979

Recap

Atlanta Hawks 85, Philadelphia 76ers 81

Spectrum, Philadelphia

December 14, 1979

Recap

Atlanta Hawks 103, Philadelphia 76ers 98

Spectrum, Philadelphia

December 15, 1979

Recap

Philadelphia 76ers 96, Atlanta Hawks 112

The Omni, Atlanta

March 11, 1980

Recap

Philadelphia 76ers 102, Atlanta Hawks 97 (OT)

The Omni, Atlanta

March 26, 1980

Recap

Atlanta Hawks 81, Philadelphia 76ers 84

Spectrum, Philadelphia

This was the first playoff meeting between the 76ers and the Hawks.

=== Western Conference semifinals ===
==== (1) Los Angeles Lakers vs. (4) Phoenix Suns ====
April 8

Boxscore

Phoenix Suns 110, Los Angeles Lakers 119
Scoring by quarter: 26–26, 21–26, 32–37, 31–30
Pts: Mike Bratz 25; Rebs: Rich Kelley 10; Asts: Don Buse 9	Pts: Kareem Abdul-Jabbar 30; Rebs: Johnson, Abdul-Jabbar 12 each Asts: Magic Johnson 16
Los Angeles leads series, 1–0

The Forum, Inglewood, California
Attendance: 15,892

April 9

Boxscore

Phoenix Suns 128, Los Angeles Lakers 131 (OT)
Scoring by quarter: 26–27, 28–27, 34–34, 32–32, Overtime: 8–11
Pts: Paul Westphal 37; Rebs: Gar Heard 9 Asts: Alvan Adams 12	Pts: Kareem Abdul-Jabbar 32; Rebs: Magic Johnson 13; Asts: Norm Nixon 12
Los Angeles leads series, 2–0

The Forum, Inglewood, California
Attendance: 14,286

April 11

Boxscore

Los Angeles Lakers 108, Phoenix Suns 105
Scoring by quarter: 26–24, 23–32, 26–20, 33–29
Pts: Kareem Abdul-Jabbar 37; Rebs: Magic Johnson 13; Asts: Norm Nixon 8	Pts: Walter Davis 28; Rebs: Gar Heard 11; Asts: Davis, Buse 5 each
Los Angeles leads series, 3–0

Arizona Veterans Memorial Coliseum, Phoenix, Arizona
Attendance: 12,660

April 13

Boxscore

Los Angeles Lakers 101, Phoenix Suns 127
Scoring by quarter: 25–31, 22–35, 28–26, 26–35
Pts: Kareem Abdul-Jabbar 25; Rebs: Kareem Abdul-Jabbar 11; Asts: Magic Johnson 13	Pts: Paul Westphal 25; Rebs: Gar Heard 9 Asts: Buse, Adams 6 each
Los Angeles leads series, 3–1

Arizona Veterans Memorial Coliseum, Phoenix, Arizona
Attendance: 12,660

April 15

Boxscore

Phoenix Suns 101, Los Angeles Lakers 126
Scoring by quarter: 18–26, 24–34, 34–37, 25–29
Pts: Walter Davis 24; Rebs: Adams, Cook 6 each Asts: Rich Kelley 7	Pts: Kareem Abdul-Jabbar 35; Rebs: Kareem Abdul-Jabbar 16; Asts: Norm Nixon 13
Los Angeles wins series, 4–1

The Forum, Inglewood, California
Attendance: 17,505

Regular-season series
Tied 3–3 in the regular-season series

November 2, 1979

Recap

Phoenix Suns 110, Los Angeles Lakers 112

The Forum, Inglewood, California

November 23, 1979

Recap

Los Angeles Lakers 112, Phoenix Suns 126

Arizona Veterans Memorial Coliseum, Phoenix, Arizona

December 30, 1979

Recap

Phoenix Suns 105, Los Angeles Lakers 113

The Forum, Inglewood, California

March 2, 1980

Recap

Los Angeles Lakers 115, Phoenix Suns 123

Arizona Veterans Memorial Coliseum, Phoenix, Arizona

March 16, 1980

Recap

Phoenix Suns 106, Los Angeles Lakers 128

The Forum, Inglewood, California

March 19, 1980

Recap

Los Angeles Lakers 108, Phoenix Suns 112

Arizona Veterans Memorial Coliseum, Phoenix, Arizona

This was the second playoff meeting between these two teams, with the Lakers winning the first meeting.

Previous playoff series
Los Angeles leads 1–0 in all-time playoff series

1970

Los Angeles Lakers 4, Phoenix Suns 3

1970 Western Division Semifinals

==== (2) Milwaukee Bucks vs. (3) Seattle SuperSonics ====
April 8

Boxscore

Milwaukee Bucks 113, Seattle SuperSonics 114 (OT)
Scoring by quarter: 28–26, 29–31, 19–21, 27–25, Overtime: 10–11
Pts: Bob Lanier 27; Rebs: Bob Lanier 10; Asts: Quinn Buckner 8	Pts: Gus Williams 30; Rebs: Jack Sikma 11; Asts: John Johnson 6
Seattle leads series, 1–0

Seattle Center Coliseum, Seattle, Washington
Attendance: 13,648

- Dennis Johnson hits 3 pointer with 1 second left.

April 9

Boxscore

Milwaukee Bucks 114, Seattle SuperSonics 112 (OT)
Scoring by quarter: 33–30, 31–25, 29–27, 15–26, Overtime: 6–4
Pts: Brian Winters 28; Rebs: Bob Lanier 8 Asts: Brian Winters 5	Pts: Lonnie Shelton 25; Rebs: Lonnie Shelton 9 Asts: Williams, J. Johnson 7 each
Series tied, 1–1

Seattle Center Coliseum, Seattle, Washington
Attendance: 14,050

April 11

Boxscore

Seattle SuperSonics 91, Milwaukee Bucks 95
Scoring by quarter: 26–32, 21–28, 20–16, 24–19
Pts: Jack Sikma 20; Rebs: Jack Sikma 13; Asts: Williams, J. Johnson 7 each	Pts: Bob Lanier 24; Rebs: Marques Johnson 10; Asts: Quinn Buckner 7
Milwaukee leads series, 2–1

MECCA Arena, Milwaukee, Wisconsin
Attendance: 10,938

April 13

Boxscore

Seattle SuperSonics 112, Milwaukee Bucks 107
Scoring by quarter: 28–22, 27–22, 30–28, 27–35
Pts: Gus Williams 32; Rebs: Lonnie Shelton 15; Asts: John Johnson 7	Pts: Marques Johnson 31; Rebs: Lanier, Meyers 9 each Asts: Junior Bridgeman 8
Series tied, 2–2

MECCA Arena, Milwaukee, Wisconsin
Attendance: 10,938

April 15

Boxscore

Milwaukee Bucks 108, Seattle SuperSonics 97
Scoring by quarter: 28–26, 31–27, 26–19, 23–25
Pts: Bob Lanier 22; Rebs: Marques Johnson 8 Asts: Bob Lanier 6	Pts: Gus Williams 22; Rebs: Jack Sikma 9 Asts: Dennis Johnson 7
Milwaukee leads series, 3–2

Kingdome, Seattle, Washington
Attendance: 40,172

- Attendance of 40,172 was a previous NBA record.

April 18

Boxscore

Seattle SuperSonics 86, Milwaukee Bucks 85
Scoring by quarter: 22–20, 26–15, 23–32, 15–18
Pts: Dennis Johnson 18; Rebs: Paul Silas 14; Asts: John Johnson 7	Pts: Marques Johnson 22; Rebs: Bob Lanier 12; Asts: Brian Winters 7
Series tied, 3–3

MECCA Arena, Milwaukee, Wisconsin
Attendance: 10,938

April 20

Boxscore

Milwaukee Bucks 94, Seattle SuperSonics 98
Scoring by quarter: 25–31, 25–20, 22–19, 22–28
Pts: Marques Johnson 22; Rebs: Bob Lanier 15; Asts: Quinn Buckner 7	Pts: Gus Williams 33; Rebs: Lonnie Shelton 15; Asts: Dennis Johnson 5
Seattle wins series, 4–3

Seattle Center Coliseum, Seattle, Washington
Attendance: 14,050

Regular-season series
Seattle won 4–2 in the regular-season series

November 4, 1979

Recap

Seattle SuperSonics 114, Milwaukee Bucks 101

MECCA Arena, Milwaukee

November 14, 1979

Recap

Milwaukee Bucks 117, Seattle SuperSonics 136

Kingdome, Seattle

December 11, 1979

Recap

Seattle SuperSonics 103, Milwaukee Bucks 99

MECCA Arena, Milwaukee

January 31, 1980

Recap

Milwaukee Bucks 101, Seattle SuperSonics 105

Kingdome, Seattle

March 12, 1980

Recap

Seattle SuperSonics 103, Milwaukee Bucks 112

MECCA Arena, Milwaukee

March 19, 1980

Recap

Milwaukee Bucks 108, Seattle SuperSonics 106

Kingdome, Seattle

This was the first playoff meeting between the Bucks and the SuperSonics.

== Conference finals ==
=== Eastern Conference finals ===
==== (1) Boston Celtics vs. (3) Philadelphia 76ers ====
April 18

Boxscore

Philadelphia 76ers 96, Boston Celtics 93
Scoring by quarter: 22–25, 22–27, 32–20, 20–21
Pts: Julius Erving 29; Rebs: Darryl Dawkins 10; Asts: Cheeks, Hollins 6 each	Pts: Larry Bird 27; Rebs: Dave Cowens 10; Asts: Tiny Archibald 7
Philadelphia leads series, 1–0

Boston Garden, Boston, Massachusetts
Attendance: 15,320
Referees: Joe Gushue, Ed Middleton, Ralph Lembo

April 20

Boxscore

Philadelphia 76ers 90, Boston Celtics 96
Scoring by quarter: 22–29, 28–25, 14–20, 26–22
Pts: Julius Erving 24; Rebs: Darryl Dawkins 11; Asts: Lionel Hollins 5	Pts: Larry Bird 31; Rebs: Cedric Maxwell 15; Asts: Tiny Archibald 8
Series tied, 1–1

Boston Garden, Boston, Massachusetts
Attendance: 15,320
Referees: Jack Madden, Lee Jones, Dick Bavetta

April 23

Boxscore

Boston Celtics 97, Philadelphia 76ers 99
Scoring by quarter: 28–26, 19–19, 19–33, 31–21
Pts: Larry Bird 22; Rebs: Larry Bird 21; Asts: Tiny Archibald 7	Pts: Julius Erving 28; Rebs: Julius Erving 11; Asts: Lionel Hollins 9
Philadelphia leads series, 2–1

Spectrum, Philadelphia, Pennsylvania
Attendance: 18,276

April 25

Boxscore

Boston Celtics 90, Philadelphia 76ers 102
Scoring by quarter: 21–28, 31–31, 22–27, 16–16
Pts: Larry Bird 19; Rebs: Larry Bird 13; Asts: Gerald Henderson 6	Pts: Julius Erving 30; Rebs: Julius Erving 10; Asts: Maurice Cheeks 10
Philadelphia leads series, 3–1

Spectrum, Philadelphia, Pennsylvania
Attendance: 18,276

April 27

Boxscore

Philadelphia 76ers 105, Boston Celtics 94
Scoring by quarter: 30–28, 28–24, 25–21, 22–21
Pts: Lionel Hollins 24; Rebs: three players 9 each Asts: Lionel Hollins 7	Pts: Archibald, Cowens 22 each Rebs: Larry Bird 14; Asts: Tiny Archibald 9
Philadelphia wins series, 4–1

Boston Garden, Boston, Massachusetts
Attendance: 15,320
Referees: Earl Strom, Wally Rooney, Mike Mathis

- Pete Maravich's final NBA game; Dave Cowens' final NBA game with Celtics.

Regular-season series
Tied 3–3 in the regular-season series

November 10, 1979

Recap

Boston Celtics 94, Philadelphia 76ers 95

Spectrum, Philadelphia

December 19, 1979

Recap

Philadelphia 76ers 89, Boston Celtics 112

Boston Garden, Boston

December 22, 1979

Recap

Boston Celtics 113, Philadelphia 76ers 126

Spectrum, Philadelphia

February 6, 1980

Recap

Philadelphia 76ers 110, Boston Celtics 129

Boston Garden, Boston

March 7, 1980

Recap

Philadelphia 76ers 92, Boston Celtics 111

Boston Garden, Boston

March 30, 1980

Recap

Boston Celtics 110, Philadelphia 76ers 116

Spectrum, Philadelphia

This was the 15th playoff meeting between these two teams, with the Celtics winning eight of the first 14 meetings.

Previous playoff series
Boston leads 8–6 in all-time playoff series

1953

Boston Celtics 2, Syracuse Nationals 0

1953 Eastern Division Semifinals

1954

Boston Celtics 0, Syracuse Nationals 2

1954 Eastern Division Round Robin Semifinals

1954

Boston Celtics 0, Syracuse Nationals 2

1954 Eastern Division Finals

1955

Boston Celtics 1, Syracuse Nationals 3

1955 Eastern Division Finals

1956

Boston Celtics 1, Syracuse Nationals 2

1956 Eastern Division Semifinals

1957

Boston Celtics 3, Syracuse Nationals 0

1957 Eastern Division Finals

1959

Boston Celtics 4, Syracuse Nationals 3

1959 Eastern Division Finals

1961

Boston Celtics 4, Syracuse Nationals 1

1961 Eastern Division Finals

1965

Boston Celtics 4, Philadelphia 76ers 3

1965 Eastern Division Finals

1966

Boston Celtics 4, Philadelphia 76ers 1

1966 Eastern Division Finals

1967

Boston Celtics 1, Philadelphia 76ers 4

1967 Eastern Division Finals

1968

Boston Celtics 4, Philadelphia 76ers 3

1968 Eastern Division Finals

1969

Boston Celtics 4, Philadelphia 76ers 1

1969 Eastern Division Semifinals

1977

Boston Celtics 3, Philadelphia 76ers 4

1977 Eastern Conference Semifinals

=== Western Conference finals ===
==== (1) Los Angeles Lakers vs. (3) Seattle SuperSonics ====
April 22

Boxscore

Seattle SuperSonics 108, Los Angeles Lakers 107
Scoring by quarter: 24–26, 23–24, 30–31, 31–26
Pts: Gus Williams 28; Rebs: Lonnie Shelton 9 Asts: John Johnson 9	Pts: Kareem Abdul-Jabbar 26; Rebs: three players 8 each Asts: Norm Nixon 11
Seattle leads series, 1–0

The Forum, Inglewood, California
Attendance: 17,505

- Jack Sikma hits a game-winning free throw with 2 seconds left.

April 23

Boxscore

Seattle SuperSonics 99, Los Angeles Lakers 108
Scoring by quarter: 30–31, 23–24, 21–30, 25–23
Pts: Gus Williams 24; Rebs: Jack Sikma 11; Asts: Jack Sikma 8	Pts: Kareem Abdul-Jabbar 31; Rebs: Kareem Abdul-Jabbar 16; Asts: Norm Nixon 12
Series tied, 1–1

The Forum, Inglewood, California
Attendance: 17,505

April 25

Boxscore

Los Angeles Lakers 104, Seattle SuperSonics 100
Scoring by quarter: 28–27, 20–25, 24–16, 32–32
Pts: Kareem Abdul-Jabbar 33; Rebs: Kareem Abdul-Jabbar 13; Asts: M. Johnson, Cooper 10 each	Pts: Gus Williams 23; Rebs: John Johnson 9 Asts: Gus Williams 11
Los Angeles leads series, 2–1

Hec Edmundson Pavilion, Seattle, Washington
Attendance: 8,524

April 27

Boxscore

Los Angeles Lakers 98, Seattle SuperSonics 93
Scoring by quarter: 22–26, 17–31, 33–18, 26–18
Pts: Kareem Abdul-Jabbar 25; Rebs: Wilkes, M. Johnson 13 each Asts: Norm Nixon 8	Pts: Gus Williams 25; Rebs: Dennis Johnson 9 Asts: Gus Williams 7
Los Angeles leads series, 3–1

Hec Edmundson Pavilion, Seattle, Washington
Attendance: 8,524

April 30

Boxscore

Seattle SuperSonics 105, Los Angeles Lakers 111
Scoring by quarter: 30–32, 32–22, 22–28, 21–29
Pts: Dennis Johnson 29; Rebs: Jack Sikma 9 Asts: J. Johnson, Sikma 6 each	Pts: Kareem Abdul-Jabbar 38; Rebs: Kareem Abdul-Jabbar 11; Asts: Magic Johnson 10
Los Angeles wins series, 4–1

The Forum, Inglewood, California
Attendance: 17,505

- Games 3 & 4 were not played at either the Kingdome or the Seattle Center Coliseum due to being unavailable.

Regular-season series
Los Angeles won 4–2 in the regular-season series

October 17, 1979

Recap

Los Angeles Lakers 110, Seattle SuperSonics 112

Kingdome, Seattle

October 21, 1979

Recap

Seattle SuperSonics 97, Los Angeles Lakers 106

The Forum, Inglewood, California

November 21, 1979

Recap

Los Angeles Lakers 110, Seattle SuperSonics 119

Kingdome, Seattle

December 23, 1979

Recap

Seattle SuperSonics 97, Los Angeles Lakers 102

The Forum, Inglewood, California

February 26, 1980

Recap

Seattle SuperSonics 108, Los Angeles Lakers 131

The Forum, Inglewood, California

March 22, 1980

Recap

Los Angeles Lakers 97, Seattle SuperSonics 92

Kingdome, Seattle

This was the third playoff meeting between these two teams, with the SuperSonics winning the first two meetings.

Previous playoff series
Seattle leads 2–0 in all-time playoff series

1978

Los Angeles Lakers 1, Seattle SuperSonics 2

1978 Western Conference First Round

1979

Los Angeles Lakers 1, Seattle SuperSonics 4

1979 Western Conference Semifinals

== NBA Finals: (W1) Los Angeles Lakers vs. (E3) Philadelphia 76ers ==
May 4

Boxscore

Philadelphia 76ers 102, Los Angeles Lakers 109
Scoring by quarter: 28–26, 25–27, 17–31, 32–25
Pts: Julius Erving 20; Rebs: Bobby Jones 10; Asts: Lionel Hollins 8	Pts: Kareem Abdul-Jabbar 33; Rebs: Kareem Abdul-Jabbar 14; Asts: Magic Johnson 10
Los Angeles leads series, 1–0

The Forum, Inglewood, California
Attendance: 17,505
Referees: Earl Strom, Jack Madden

May 7

Boxscore

Philadelphia 76ers 107, Los Angeles Lakers 104
Scoring by quarter: 31–21, 28–20, 30–30, 18–33
Pts: Darryl Dawkins 25; Rebs: Julius Erving 10; Asts: Maurice Cheeks 10	Pts: Kareem Abdul-Jabbar 38; Rebs: Kareem Abdul-Jabbar 14; Asts: Magic Johnson 11
Series tied, 1–1

The Forum, Inglewood, California
Attendance: 17,505
Referees: Joe Gushue, Jake O'Donnell

May 10

Boxscore

Los Angeles Lakers 111, Philadelphia 76ers 101
Scoring by quarter: 31–18, 27–26, 26–21, 27–36
Pts: Kareem Abdul-Jabbar 33; Rebs: Kareem Abdul-Jabbar 14; Asts: Norm Nixon 7	Pts: Julius Erving 24; Rebs: Caldwell Jones 11; Asts: Lionel Hollins 9
Los Angeles leads series, 2–1

Spectrum, Philadelphia, Pennsylvania
Attendance: 18,726
Referees: Darell Garretson, Ed T. Rush

May 11

Boxscore

Los Angeles Lakers 102, Philadelphia 76ers 105
Scoring by quarter: 21–28, 30–21, 25–32, 26–24
Pts: Magic Johnson 28; Rebs: Kareem Abdul-Jabbar 11; Asts: Magic Johnson 9	Pts: Darryl Dawkins 26; Rebs: Caldwell Jones 10; Asts: Lionel Hollins 13
Series tied, 2–2

Spectrum, Philadelphia, Pennsylvania
Attendance: 18,726
Referees: Jake O'Donnell, Paul Mihalak

- Julius Erving makes the "Up and Under" move.

May 14

Boxscore

Philadelphia 76ers 103, Los Angeles Lakers 108
Scoring by quarter: 22–25, 31–25, 20–31, 30–27
Pts: Julius Erving 36; Rebs: Caldwell Jones 10; Asts: Lionel Hollins 10	Pts: Kareem Abdul-Jabbar 40; Rebs: Abdul-Jabbar, Johnson 15 each Asts: Magic Johnson 10
Los Angeles leads series, 3–2

The Forum, Inglewood, California
Attendance: 17,505
Referees: Darell Garretson, Earl Strom

- Kareem Abdul-Jabbar dunks the clutch 3-point play with 33 seconds left.

May 16

Boxscore

Los Angeles Lakers 123, Philadelphia 76ers 107
Scoring by quarter: 32–29, 28–31, 33–23, 30–24
Pts: Magic Johnson 42; Rebs: Magic Johnson 15; Asts: Norm Nixon 9	Pts: Julius Erving 27; Rebs: Bobby Jones 9 Asts: Maurice Cheeks 8
Los Angeles wins series, 4–2

Spectrum, Philadelphia, Pennsylvania
Attendance: 18,726
Referees: Joe Gushue, Jack Madden

- Magic Johnson starts at Center.

Regular-season series
Tied 1–1 in the regular-season series

January 25, 1980

Recap

Philadelphia 76ers 103, Los Angeles Lakers 124

The Forum, Inglewood, California

February 10, 1980

Recap

Los Angeles Lakers 104, Philadelphia 76ers 105

Spectrum, Philadelphia

This was the third playoff meeting between these two teams, with the Lakers winning the first two meetings. These series took place prior to the relocation of the Lakers (1960) and 76ers (formerly Nationals) (1963).

Previous playoff series
Los Angeles/ Minneapolis leads 2–0 in all-time playoff series

1950

Minneapolis Lakers 4, Syracuse Nationals 2

1950 NBA Finals

1954

Minneapolis Lakers 4, Syracuse Nationals 3

1954 NBA Finals
