= Kevin Restani =

American basketball player (1951–2010)

Personal information
- Born: December 23, 1951 San Francisco, California, U.S.
- Died: April 25, 2010 (aged 58) San Francisco, California, U.S.
- Listed height: 6 ft 9 in (2.06 m)
- Listed weight: 225 lb (102 kg)

Career information
- High school: Archbishop Riordan (San Francisco, California)
- College: San Francisco (1971–1974)
- NBA draft: 1974: 3rd round, 39th overall pick
- Drafted by: Cleveland Cavaliers
- Playing career: 1974–1988
- Position: Power forward / center
- Number: 18, 31, 24
- Coaching career: 1988–1991

Career history

Playing
- 1974–1977: Milwaukee Bucks
- 1977–1978: Kansas City Kings
- 1978–1979: Milwaukee Bucks
- 1979–1981: San Antonio Spurs
- 1981–1982: Cleveland Cavaliers
- 1982–1986: Libertas Livorno
- 1986–1987: Libertas Forlì
- 1987–1988: AMG Sebastiani Rieti

Coaching
- 1988–1989: Libertas Livorno
- 1989–1991: Rovereto Basket

Career highlights
- First-team All-WCC (1974)

Career NBA statistics
- Points: 3,386 (6.2 ppg)
- Rebounds: 2,206 (4.0 rpg)
- Assists: 747 (1.4 apg)
- Stats at NBA.com
- Stats at Basketball Reference

Kevin Gilbert "Big Bird" Restani (December 23, 1951 – April 25, 2010) was an American professional basketball player from San Francisco, California.

After being selected by the Cleveland Cavaliers in the third round of the 1974 NBA draft, Restani played in eight seasons with the Milwaukee Bucks, New York Knicks, San Antonio Spurs, and Cavaliers. While with the Spurs, he was a member of the "Bruise Brothers" along with George Johnson, Paul Griffin, Dave Corzine, and Mark Olberding.

Restani was a Catholic.

In more recent years he was a high school counselor at Balboa High School in San Francisco.

Restani died of a heart attack on April 25, 2010.

== Career statistics ==
Legend
GP	Games played	GS	Games started	MPG	Minutes per game
FG%	Field goal percentage	3P%	3-point field goal percentage	FT%	Free throw percentage
RPG	Rebounds per game	APG	Assists per game	SPG	Steals per game
BPG	Blocks per game	PPG	Points per game	**Bold**	Career high

=== Regular season ===
Year	Team	GP	GS	MPG	FG%	3P%	FT%	RPG	APG	SPG	BPG	PPG
1974–75	Milwaukee	76	-	23.1	.440	-	.714	**5.3**	1.6	0.5	**0.3**	5.4
1975–76	Milwaukee	**82**	-	20.1	.475	-	.571	4.6	1.2	0.4	0.1	6.0
1976–77	Milwaukee	64	-	17.4	.518	-	.500	4.1	1.4	0.5	0.2	5.6
1977–78	Milwaukee	8	-	10.5	.464	-	.000	1.8	1.1	0.0	0.1	3.3
1977–78	Kansas City	46	-	10.1	.424	-	**.818**	2.0	0.5	0.1	0.1	2.8
1978–79	Milwaukee	81	-	19.7	.495	-	.699	4.8	1.5	0.4	**0.3**	7.1
1979–80	San Antonio	**82**	-	**24.0**	.508	.172	.814	4.7	**2.3**	**0.7**	0.1	**10.7**
1980–81	San Antonio	64	-	15.6	**.520**	**.375**	.705	2.7	1.3	0.3	0.2	7.0
1981–82	San Antonio	13	0	11.2	.321	.000	.750	2.7	0.5	0.1	**0.3**	1.6
1981–82	Cleveland	34	0	9.9	.383	.000	.583	2.3	0.4	0.3	0.2	1.6
Career		550	0	18.4	.486	.205	.717	4.0	1.4	0.4	0.2	6.2

=== Playoffs ===
Year	Team	GP	GS	MPG	FG%	3P%	FT%	RPG	APG	SPG	BPG	PPG
1975–76	Milwaukee	**3**	-	11.0	.200	-	.000	1.7	0.3	**0.3**	0.0	0.7
1979–80	San Antonio	**3**	-	**24.7**	**.607**	.000	**.444**	**5.3**	**1.0**	0.0	**0.3**	**12.7**
1980–81	San Antonio	**3**	-	3.7	.333	.000	.000	0.7	0.0	0.0	**0.3**	0.7
Career		9	-	13.1	.528	.000	.444	2.6	0.4	0.1	0.2	4.7
