= Bruiser =

Bruiser may refer to:

== Music ==
- The Bruisers, U.S. rock band from Portsmouth
- Bruiser, indie rock trio that features ex-Local H drummer Joe Daniels
- Bruiser (album), 2011 album by The Duke Spirit

== Film and television ==
- The Bruiser, a 1916 American drama film
- Bruiser (2000 film), a motion picture directed by George A. Romero
- Bruiser (2022 film), a film starring Trevante Rhodes
- Bruiser (TV series), a BBC television series

== Nickname or ring name ==
- Bru McCoy, American football player
- Bruiser Flint (born 1965), American collegiate men's basketball head coach
- Bruiser Kinard (1914–1985), American football player nicknamed "Bruiser", member of the Pro Football Hall of Fame
- Bruiser Brody, ring name of former American professional wrestler Frank Donald Goodish (1946-1988)
- Bob Sweetan (born 1940), American retired professional wrestler, nicknamed "Bruiser", and sex offender
- Bruiser Bedlam, a ring name of American professional wrestler Ion Croitoru (born 1965)
- Belfast Bruiser, stage name for Irish professional wrestler Fit Finlay (born 1958)
- British Bruisers, a former English professional wrestling tag team
- Bruiser Costa, a professional wrestler from All-Star Wrestling
- Bruiser, a professional wrestler from the United States Wrestling Association

== Fictional characters ==
- Molly Hayes, briefly known as Bruiser, a Marvel Comics character in the series Runaways
- Bruiser Khang, in the video game Tales of Destiny
- Bruiser, a large demonic enemy in the video game expansion pack Doom 3: Resurrection of Evil
- Nick and Rick Bruiser, the final two opponents in Super NES video game Super Punch-Out!!
- Bruiser, Elle Woods' chihuahua in the Legally Blonde movies
- The Bruisers, fictional neighbours in Mr. Bean: The Animated Series

== Other uses ==
- HMS Bruiser, various British Royal Navy warships
- Bruiser (bull), #32Y, a World Champion bucking bull
- Chicago Bruisers, a former Arena Football League team (1987-1989)
- Bruiser (Pillow Pal), a Pillow Pal dog made by Ty, Inc.
- Bruiser and Marigold, costumed mascots for the Baylor University Bears

== See also ==
- Dick the Bruiser, nickname of American professional wrestler and football player William Fritz Afflis (1929-1991)
- Crystl Bustos (born 1977), American softball player known as "The Big Bruiser"
