= Mark Olberding =

American basketball player (born 1956)

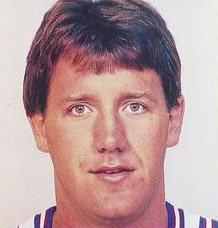
- Olberding, circa 1986

Personal information
- Born: April 21, 1956 (age 70) Melrose, Minnesota, U.S.
- Listed height: 6 ft 8 in (2.03 m)
- Listed weight: 225 lb (102 kg)

Career information
- High school: Melrose (Melrose, Minnesota)
- College: Minnesota (1974–1975)
- NBA draft: 1975: undrafted
- Playing career: 1975–1988
- Position: Power forward / small forward
- Number: 53, 52

Career history
- 1975: San Diego Sails
- 1975–1982: San Antonio Spurs
- 1982–1983: Chicago Bulls
- 1983–1987: Kansas City/Sacramento Kings
- 1987–1988: Benetton Treviso

Career highlights
- ABA All-Rookie Team (1976); Second-team All-Big Ten (1975); Second-team Parade All-American (1974)
- Stats at NBA.com
- Stats at Basketball Reference

Mark Allen Olberding (born April 21, 1956) is an American former professional basketball player born in Melrose, Minnesota.

A 6'8" forward from the University of Minnesota, Olberding played 12 seasons (1975–1987) in the American Basketball Association (ABA) and National Basketball Association (NBA) as a member of the San Diego Sails (1975–76), San Antonio Spurs (1975 to 1982), Chicago Bulls (1982–83) and Kansas City/Sacramento Kings (1983 to 1987). He had his best seasons with the Spurs, for whom he played 536 games. One of the highlights of his career occurred on January 21, 1977, when he made 10 field goals without missing in a game against the Boston Celtics. In the 1987–88 season, he played professionally in Italy for Benetton Treviso.

During the 1980s, Spurs teammates Olberding, George Johnson, Dave Corzine, Kevin Restani, Paul Griffin, and Reggie Johnson earned the nickname "The Bruise Brothers" for their physical style of play.

Olberding currently lives in San Antonio.
