= Truck Robinson =

American basketball player (born 1951)

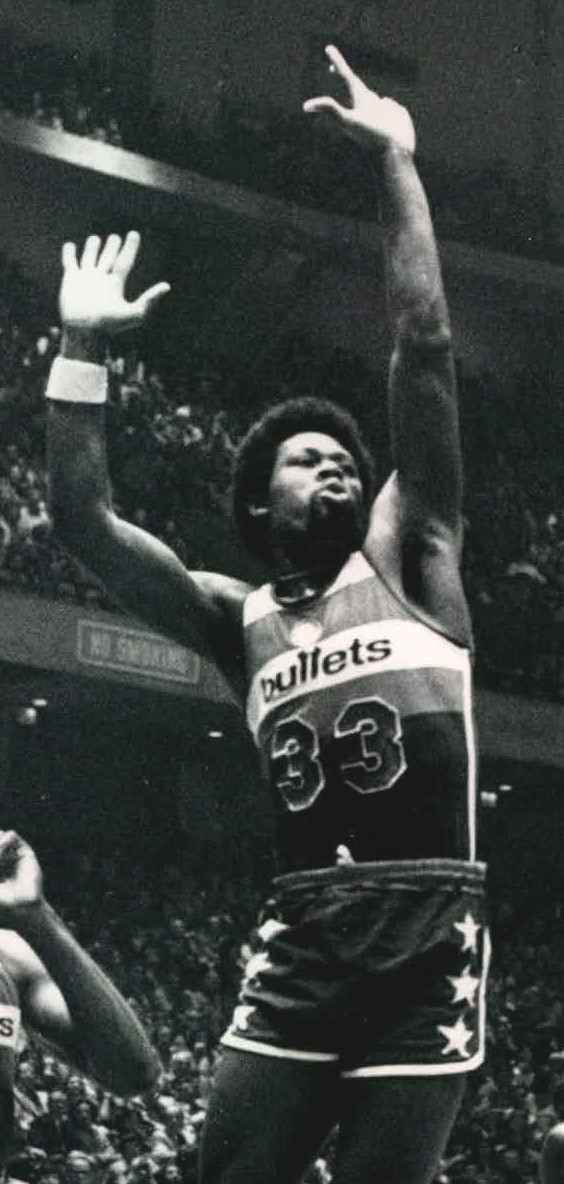
- Robinson in 1975

Personal information
- Born: October 4, 1951 (age 75) Jacksonville, Florida, U.S.
- Listed height: 6 ft 7 in (2.01 m)
- Listed weight: 225 lb (102 kg)

Career information
- High school: William M. Raines (Jacksonville, Florida)
- College: Tennessee State (1970–1974)
- NBA draft: 1974: 2nd round, 22nd overall pick
- Drafted by: Washington Bullets
- Playing career: 1974–1985
- Position: Power forward
- Number: 33, 21, 23
- Coaching career: 2009–2012

Career history

Playing
- 1974–1977: Washington Bullets
- 1977: Atlanta Hawks
- 1977–1979: New Orleans Jazz
- 1979–1982: Phoenix Suns
- 1982–1985: New York Knicks

Coaching
- 2009–2012: Sacramento Kings (assistant)

Career highlights
- 2× NBA All-Star (1978, 1981); All-NBA First Team (1978); NBA rebounding leader (1978)

Career NBA statistics
- Points: 11,988 (15.5 ppg)
- Rebounds: 7,267 (9.4 rpg)
- Assists: 1,348 (1.7 apg)
- Stats at NBA.com
- Stats at Basketball Reference

Leonard Eugene "Truck" Robinson (born October 4, 1951) is an American former professional basketball player and coach. He played in the National Basketball Association (NBA) for the Washington Bullets (1974–1977), Atlanta Hawks (1977), New Orleans Jazz (1977–1979), Phoenix Suns (1979–1982), and New York Knicks (1982–1985).

In 11 seasons Robinson played in 772 games, stayed 25,141 minutes on the court and had a .483 field goal percentage (4,816 for 9,971), .662 free throw percentage (2,355 for 3,556), 7,267 total rebounds (1,985 offensive and 5,282 defensive), 1,348 assists, 533 steals, 510 blocks, 2,253 personal fouls and 11,988 points. He ranks in the NBA's top 100 lists for career rebounds, defensive rebounds and career rebounds per game.

He was an Eastern Conference champion in 1975 with the Bullets. In the 1977–78 season with the Jazz, he led the NBA in minutes played (3,638), defensive rebounds (990), total rebounds (1,288) and rebounds per game (15.7), in addition to being named to the All-NBA First Team and East All-Star Team the same season. He was also named to the West All-Star Team in 1981, the year he and the Suns won the Pacific Division.

Following his retirement from playing, Robinson served as an assistant coach for the Sacramento Kings from 2009 to 2012.

== Biography ==
Known throughout the league as "Truck", Leonard Robinson used his body, playmaking, and shot as a forward in the 1970s and 1980s. He had physical attributes of a power forward along with the mobility of a small forward. He delivered a consistent cargo of firepower and rebounding for 11 years in the NBA. A two-time All-Star, Robinson had his best season with the New Orleans Jazz in 1977–78, when he averaged 22.7 points and led the NBA with 15.7 rebounds per game.

After starring at Tennessee State University, Robinson was taken by the Washington Bullets in the second round of the 1974 NBA draft. As a rookie in 1974–75, Robinson had to wait his turn behind Elvin Hayes and Mike Riordan and averaged just 5.8 points in 13.1 minutes per game. He made small contributions on a Bullets team that reached the NBA Finals that year, losing to the Golden State Warriors in four games.

Robinson's playing time doubled in his sophomore season, and his scoring and rebounding numbers improved accordingly. But it wasn't until the 1976–77 campaign, when the Bullets sent Robinson to Atlanta for Tom Henderson and a draft choice, that Robinson established himself as a star. In split duty between the Bullets and Hawks, Robinson averaged 19.0 points and 10.8 rebounds.

Prior to the 1977–78 season Robinson signed as a free agent with the New Orleans Jazz, and the Jazz sent the Hawks Ron Behagen (and cash) as compensation. In his only full season with the Jazz, Robinson turned in the finest performance of his career. At just 6-foot-7, he became one of the first non-centers ever to lead the league in rebounding, grabbing 15.7 boards per game. He also notched his career-best scoring effort (22.7 ppg), made his first All-Star appearance, and was named to the All-NBA First Team at season's end.

The Jazz, under Coach Elgin Baylor, went 39-43 but missed the playoffs for the fourth time in their four-year history. Robinson started well in 1978–79, averaging 24.2 points and 13.4 rebounds through the first 43 games. But on January 12 the Jazz traded Robinson to the Phoenix Suns for two players and two first-round draft picks. The Suns boasted a deeper roster than the Jazz, and over the season's final 26 games Robinson averaged just 16.0 points in 29.1 minutes per game. Phoenix won 50 games that year and advanced to the Western Conference Finals before losing to Seattle in seven games.

Over his next three seasons with the Suns, Robinson averaged at least 17 points and 9 rebounds each year. Following the 1981–82 campaign he was traded to the New York Knicks for Maurice Lucas. In 1982–83 Robinson suffered through the worst slump of his career, averaging just 9.5 points and 8.1 rebounds. Fans began complaining about their "truck with four flat tires" and would often chant "Dump Truck." He played another full season for New York—with similar results—before retiring in 1984–85.

In 11 NBA seasons Robinson amassed 11,988 points and 7,267 rebounds.

== NBA career statistics ==
Legend
GP	Games played	GS	Games started	MPG	Minutes per game
FG%	Field goal percentage	3P%	3-point field goal percentage	FT%	Free throw percentage
RPG	Rebounds per game	APG	Assists per game	SPG	Steals per game
BPG	Blocks per game	PPG	Points per game	**Bold**	Career high
*	Led the league

=== Regular season ===
Year	Team	GP	GS	MPG	FG%	3P%	FT%	RPG	APG	SPG	BPG	PPG
1974–75	Washington	76		13.1	.486		.522	4.0	0.5	0.5	0.4	5.8
1975–76	Washington	**82**		25.1	.454		.672	6.8	1.4	0.5	1.3	11.2
1976–77	Washington	41		32.4	.478		.677	8.9	1.1	0.7	0.4	16.0
1976–77	Atlanta	36		40.3	.478		**.772**	12.8	**2.7**	**1.1**	0.6	22.4
1977–78	New Orleans	**82**		**44.4***	.444		.640	**15.7***	2.1	0.9	1.0	22.7
1978–79	New Orleans	43		41.4	.485		.723	13.4	1.7	0.7	**1.5**	**24.2**
1978–79	Phoenix	26		29.1	.508		.642	8.7	1.5	0.7	0.5	16.0
1979–80	Phoenix	**82**		33.0	.512		.667	9.4	1.7	0.7	0.7	17.3
1980–81	Phoenix	**82**		37.7	.505		.629	9.6	2.5	0.8	0.5	18.8
1981–82	Phoenix	74	72	37.1	**.513**	**1.000**	.687	9.7	2.4	0.6	0.4	19.1
1982–83	New York	81	76	30.0	.462		.587	8.1	1.8	0.7	0.3	9.5
1983–84	New York	65	63	32.8	.489		.646	8.4	1.4	0.7	0.4	10.8
1984–85	New York	2	1	17.5	.400		.000	4.5	1.5	1.0	**1.5**	2.0
Career		772	212	32.6	.483	1.000	.662	9.4	1.7	0.7	0.7	15.5
All-Star		2	0	22.5	.462		.500	5.5	1.5	0.0	0.0	6.5

=== Playoffs ===
Year	Team	GP	GS	MPG	FG%	3P%	FT%	RPG	APG	SPG	BPG	PPG
1975	Washington	**17**		7.6	.333		.500	2.4	0.4	0.4	0.6	2.1
1976	Washington	7		19.6	.432		**.810**	4.7	0.7	0.7	**1.1**	7.0
1979	Phoenix	15		26.1	.403		.652	8.1	0.7	0.4	0.8	10.5
1980	Phoenix	3		21.3	.375		.714	6.7	1.3	1.0	0.7	5.7
1981	Phoenix	7		33.3	.351		.588	10.7	1.9	0.7	0.3	10.6
1982	Phoenix	7		30.4	**.563**		.300	7.6	**2.7**	0.7	0.1	13.3
1983	New York	6		**34.2**	.534		.571	**11.0**	2.2	**1.7**	0.3	**15.7**
1984	New York	12		30.2	.514		.600	8.1	0.6	0.6	0.8	7.1
Career		74	?	23.5	.448		.616	6.8	1.0	0.6	0.6	8.2

== See also ==
- List of National Basketball Association annual minutes leaders
- List of National Basketball Association annual rebounding leaders
- List of National Basketball Association single-season rebounding leaders
