= Phil Chenier =

American basketball player (born 1950)

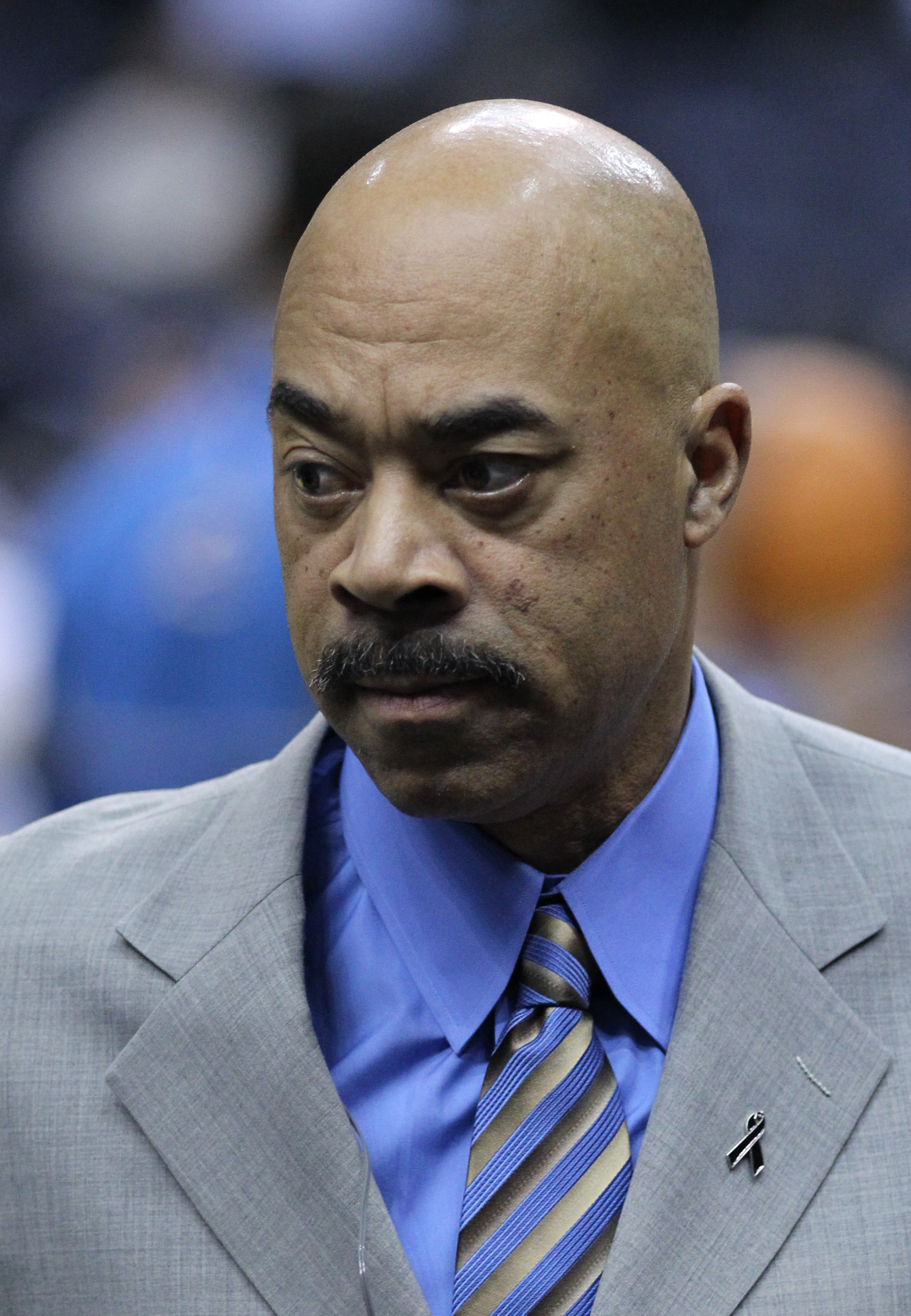
- Chenier in 2011

Personal information
- Born: October 30, 1950 (age 76) Berkeley, California, U.S.
- Listed height: 6 ft 3 in (1.91 m)
- Listed weight: 180 lb (82 kg)

Career information
- High school: Berkeley (Berkeley, California)
- College: California (1969–1971)
- NBA draft: 1971: Hardship round, 4th overall pick
- Drafted by: Baltimore Bullets
- Playing career: 1971–1981
- Position: Shooting guard
- Number: 45, 30, 15

Career history
- 1971–1979: Baltimore / Capital / Washington Bullets
- 1979–1980: Indiana Pacers
- 1981: Golden State Warriors

Career highlights
- NBA champion (1978); 3× NBA All-Star (1974, 1975, 1977); All-NBA Second Team (1975); NBA All-Rookie First Team (1972); First-team All-Pac-8 (1971); No. 45 retired by Washington Wizards; Third-team Parade All-American (1968)

Career statistics
- Points: 9,931 (17.2 ppg)
- Rebounds: 2,063 (3.6 rpg)
- Assists: 1,742 (3.0 apg)
- Stats at NBA.com
- Stats at Basketball Reference

Philip Chenier (born October 30, 1950) is an American former professional basketball player who was a shooting guard in the National Basketball Association (NBA) for ten seasons. He was also a television sports broadcaster for the NBA's Washington Wizards.

== Early years ==
Born and raised in Berkeley, California, Chenier graduated from Berkeley High School and played college basketball for the California Golden Bears in Berkeley.

== NBA playing career ==
Chenier was selected fourth in the 1971 NBA Hardship Draft by the Baltimore Bullets (as well as the Carolina Cougars in the 1971 ABA Special Circumstances Draft, the Virginia Squires in the 1973 ABA Senior Draft, and the New York Nets in the 1974 ABA Draft of NBA Players), and played for the Bullets for eight seasons, from 1971 to 1979. The franchise moved from Baltimore to Washington in 1973, after his second season. He was one of the better shooting guards in the NBA for the first six seasons in his career, but he suffered a back injury early in the 1977–78 season and had season-ending surgery. The Bullets went on to win the NBA title with Kevin Grevey as the shooting guard. Chenier was never the same player after that; he came back from his surgery late the next season, but never could crack the Bullets' starting lineup again.

Chenier was released by the Bullets after the 1978–79 season, and played briefly for the Indiana Pacers and Golden State Warriors and retired after the 1980–81 season.

Chenier, who was a 1972 NBA All-Rookie Team selection, averaged 17.2 points per game for his career, and was named to three NBA All-Star teams. He finished 8th in MVP voting in the 1974–75 season.

In 2017, the Wizards announced that they would retire Chenier's number 45 jersey. On March 23, 2018, Chenier's jersey was retired. As of 2025, he is one of only five franchise players with that honor, the others being Elvin Hayes, Wes Unseld, Gus Johnson, and Earl Monroe.

== Broadcasting career ==
Chenier, who got his start in television sports broadcasting with Home Team Sports back in 1985, has announced black college games alongside broadcasters Charlie Neil and James Brown for Black Entertainment Television. He was the color analyst for the Washington Bullets and Washington Wizards games on television from 1987 to 2017, with a final pairing for NBC Sports Washington alongside play-by-play commentator, Steve Buckhantz.

== NBA career statistics ==
Legend
GP	Games played	GS	Games started	MPG	Minutes per game
FG%	Field goal percentage	3P%	3-point field goal percentage	FT%	Free throw percentage
RPG	Rebounds per game	APG	Assists per game	SPG	Steals per game
BPG	Blocks per game	PPG	Points per game	**Bold**	Career high
†	Won an NBA championship	*	Led the league

=== Regular season ===
Year	Team	GP	GS	MPG	FG%	3P%	FT%	RPG	APG	SPG	BPG	PPG
1971–72	Baltimore	**81**	—	30.6	.415	—	.737	3.3	2.5	—	—	12.3
1972–73	Baltimore	71	—	**39.1**	.452	—	.795	4.1	**4.2**	—	—	19.7
1973–74	Capital	76	—	38.7	.434	—	.820	**5.1**	3.1	2.0	**.9**	**21.9**
1974–75	Washington	77	—	37.3	.450	—	.825	3.8	3.2	**2.3**	.8	21.8
1975–76	Washington	80	—	36.9	**.483**	—	.827	4.0	3.2	2.0	.6	19.9
1976–77	Washington	78	—	36.4	.444	—	.841	3.8	3.8	1.5	.5	20.2
1977–78†	Washington	36	—	26.0	.443	—	.790	2.8	2.0	1.0	.3	14.1
1978–79	Washington	27	—	14.3	.437	—	.643	.7	1.1	.1	.2	5.8
1979–80	Washington	20	—	23.5	.393	**.500**	.756	2.2	2.1	.9	.3	10.1
1979–80	Indiana	23	—	16.5	.385	.333	.692	1.5	2.0	.7	.4	5.4
1980–81	Golden State	9	—	9.1	.333	.333	**1.000**	.9	.8	.0	.0	3.2
Career		578	—	33.1	.444	.400	.806	3.6	3.0	1.6	.6	17.2
All-Star		3	0	16.0	.500	—	.500	1.7	1.0	.7	.0	7.3

=== Playoffs ===
Year	Team	GP	GS	MPG	FG%	3P%	FT%	RPG	APG	SPG	BPG	PPG
1972	Baltimore	6	—	25.5	.373	—	.833	2.7	.8	—	—	9.0
1973	Baltimore	5	—	42.2	**.506**	—	.750	4.2	**3.4**	—	—	17.8
1974	Capital	7	—	**44.3**	.453	—	.892	**6.1**	1.7	**1.9**	**1.1**	22.4
1975	Washington	**17***	—	40.7	.470	—	**.895**	4.5	3.2	1.3	.6	24.2
1976	Washington	7	—	37.9	.438	—	.824	3.7	1.6	.9	.4	18.0
1977	Washington	9	—	40.0	.476	—	.804	4.4	2.6	1.7	.4	**25.0**
1979	Washington	9	—	10.8	.217	—	.455	0.9	1.0	.3	.0	2.8
Career		60	—	34.8	.450	—	.845	3.8	2.2	1.2	.5	18.1

== Personal life ==
Chenier resides in Columbia, Maryland, with his wife Gerry Chenier. He has two daughters, one son and grandchildren.

== See also ==
- List of NBA single-game steals leaders
