= Wes Unseld Jr. =

American basketball coach (born 1975)

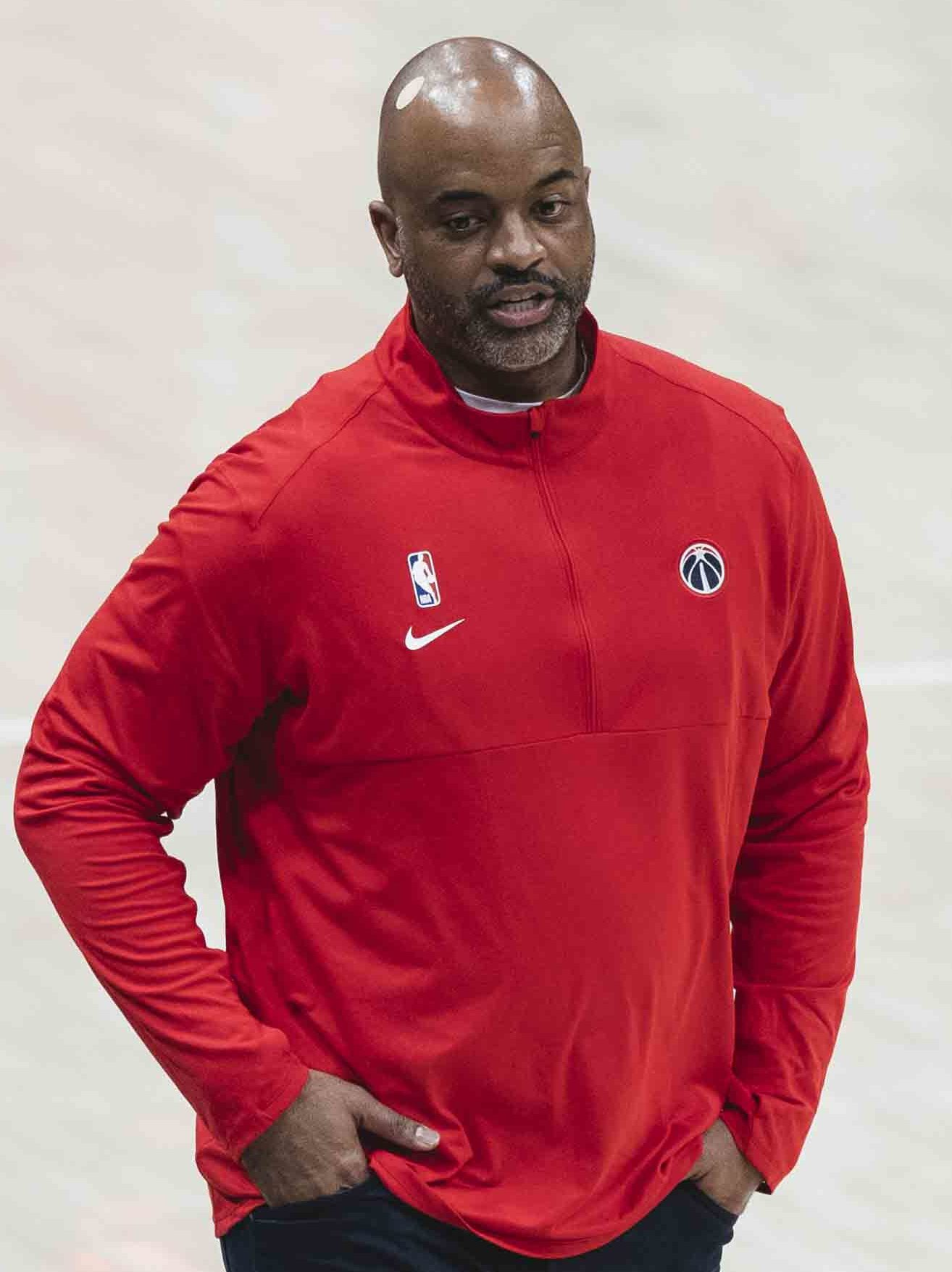
- Unseld as Washington Wizards head coach, 2021

Chicago Bulls
- Title: Assistant coach
- League: NBA

Personal information
- Born: September 20, 1975 (age 51) Catonsville, Maryland, U.S.
- Listed height: 6 ft 4 in (1.93 m)

Career information
- High school: Loyola (Towson, Maryland)
- College: Johns Hopkins (1994–1997)
- NBA draft: 1997: undrafted
- Position: Small forward
- Coaching career: 2005–present

Career history

Coaching
- 2005–2011: Washington Wizards (assistant)
- 2011–2012: Golden State Warriors (assistant)
- 2012–2015: Orlando Magic (assistant)
- 2015–2021: Denver Nuggets (assistant)
- 2021–2024: Washington Wizards
- 2024–present: Chicago Bulls (assistant)

Westley Sissel Unseld Jr. (born September 20, 1975) is an American professional basketball coach who is an assistant coach for the Chicago Bulls of the National Basketball Association (NBA). He is the son of Basketball Hall of Fame player, coach, and executive Wes Unseld.

== Early life and education ==
Unseld was born on September 20, 1975, and grew up in Catonsville, Maryland. At a young age, he developed a close attachment to basketball; his father is Basketball Hall of Fame member Wes Unseld. From the age of five, he was in locker rooms with his father before games, and after drove home with him. As an adult, he remembers "a great family atmosphere in the locker room". He played high school basketball as a center at Loyola Blakefield in Towson, Maryland. Standing at 6 ft 4 in (1.93 m), he played as a small forward during his college basketball career with the Johns Hopkins Blue Jays and graduated in 1997.

== Coaching career ==
=== Washington Wizards (2005–2011) ===
Unseld went directly from college to the NBA, starting as a personnel scout for the Washington Wizards, working for his father who was general manager. He had planned to go to graduate school after graduation but decided to give basketball one year to see if he would enjoy it. In his ninth year, after eight years of personnel and advance scouting, he was promoted to assistant coach. Unseld has been given credit for creating Washington's offensive game plan, which led to three consecutive top-ten offensive seasons from 2004 to 2007. He also worked as a scout and assistant coach for the Washington Mystics of the WNBA.

=== Golden State Warriors (2011–2012) ===
In 2011, Unseld Jr. left the Wizards for the Golden State Warriors after being denied a position as a front-row bench coach.

=== Orlando Magic (2012–2015) ===
After one season with the Warriors, Unseld went to the Orlando Magic as an assistant coach in 2012. After a 15–37 start to the 2014–15 season Unseld was fired, along with head coach Jacque Vaughn, in February, 2015.

=== Denver Nuggets (2015–2021) ===
When his lifelong friend, Tim Connelly, became general manager of the Denver Nuggets in 2015, he offered Unseld a job as an assistant coach. In 2016 he was made lead assistant coach. His special assignment had been to manage a defense that had been poor; the Nuggets went from 28th in defense in 2017–18 to 10th in the 2018–19 season. He has been credited with the development of Nikola Jokić, Jamal Murray, and Michael Porter Jr. In 2019, he interviewed for the vacant Cleveland Cavaliers head coaching job, but did not get the job. From 2018 until 2021, Denver ranked among the top six in defensive efficiency.

=== Return to the Wizards (2021–2024) ===
Unseld Jr. signed a four-year contract to become the head coach of the Washington Wizards on July 17, 2021. On January 25, 2024, Unseld Jr. was relieved of his coaching duties and moved to a front office position.

=== Chicago Bulls (2024–present) ===
On July 13, 2024, Unseld was hired as an assistant coach by the Chicago Bulls.

== Personal life ==
Unseld is married with two children. The family resides in Hinsdale, Illinois.

== Head coaching record ==
Legend
Regular season	G	Games coached	W	Games won	L	Games lost	W–L %	Win–loss %
Playoffs	PG	Playoff games	PW	Playoff wins	PL	Playoff losses	PW–L %	Playoff win–loss %

Team	Year	G	W	L	W–L%	Finish	PG	PW	PL	PW–L%	Result
Washington	2021–22	82	35	47	.427	4th in Southeast	—	—	—	—	Missed playoffs
Washington	2022–23	82	35	47	.427	3rd in Southeast	—	—	—	—	Missed playoffs
Washington	2023–24	43	7	36	.163	(fired)	—	—	—	—	—
Career		207	77	130	.372		—	—	—	—	
