= Steve Buckhantz =

American sportscaster

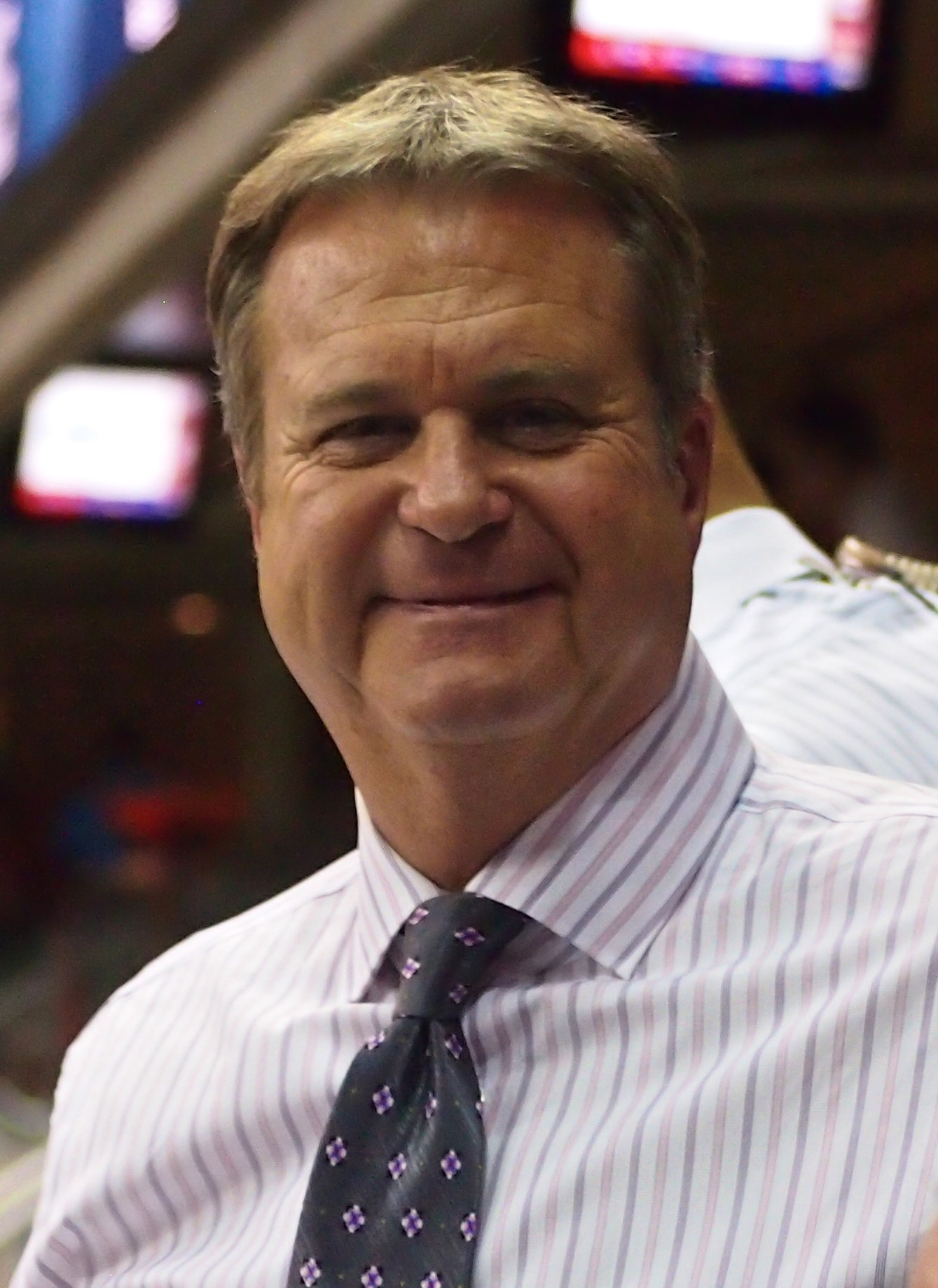
- Buckhantz in January 2013
- Born: Steven Buckhantz; June 19, 1955 (age 70); Washington, D.C., U.S.
- Occupation: Sportscaster
- Children: 2 stepchildren

Steve Buckhantz (born June 19, 1955) is a former American television play-by-play announcer for the Washington Wizards of the National Basketball Association.

== Early life and education ==
Buckhantz was born in Washington, D.C., on June 18, 1955, and grew up in Arlington County, Virginia, where his father owned a construction company. He attended James Madison University in Harrisonburg, Virginia.

== Career ==
Buckhantz began his television announcing career in 1977 at ABC Affiliate WHSV in Harrisonburg, Virginia, where he anchored the 11 p.m. sports and weather. From there, he moved to NBC Affiliate WRCB in Chattanooga, Tennessee, where he was the weekday 6 and 11pm sports anchor. He then moved to CBS station WTVF-TV in Nashville, Tennessee, where he anchored the weekend sports before heading to ABC Affiliate WSB-TV in Atlanta, where he again anchored the weekend sports. In 1984, Buckhantz moved to WTTG-TV in Washington, D.C., which eventually became one of the original Fox owned television stations. He anchored the weekday sports for nearly 14 years. Buckhantz was part of the original play-by-play announcers for the NFL on Fox in 1994 and also broadcast Big East Basketball as well as calling play-by-play for the U.S. Naval Academy Football Team from 1991-1997, when he became the television play-by-play voice for the NBA's Washington Wizards.

Buckhantz spent 22 years as the Wizards' play-by-play announcer, alongside Phil Chenier and later, Kara Lawson, on NBC Sports Washington from 1984 to 2001 and Comcast SportsNet from 2001 until his departure after the 2018-19 NBA season.

== Personal life ==
Buckhantz currently resides in Northern Virginia. He married Shelley Lawrence on May 8, 2011. Shelley has two children from a previous marriage, Jake and Olivia Lawrence.

=== 30 for 30 ===
In 2009, Buckhantz was featured in the ESPN 30 for 30 film Without Bias about the days leading up to the Len Bias death in the summer of 1986 after being chosen number 2 overall by the Boston Celtics after a stellar career at the University of Maryland. He was featured as a reporter for WTTG as the sports director at the time of Bias' death in 1986.

In 2015, Buckhantz was featured in the NFL Network (Dexter Manley A Football Life) about the career of former Redskins great Dexter Manley. He was featured as a reporter for WTTG TV as the Sports Director during Manley's NFL career.

=== Style ===
Buckhantz has garnered a reputation for his emphatic expressions, such as "Dagger", "Blocked by [player]!", "Backbreaker", "How good is he, Phil?", "How do you like that?", "Tough shot!", "It's good if it goes!....And it nearly did!", "Score the field goal, he'll go to the line!", "For the win!", "The refs have swallowed/put away their whistles!", "That's gotta be five seconds!", "That's hard to believe", "And [player/coach] is Livid!/Incensed", "Oh My!", "Follows it up twice!", "Foul, no call", and "NO, it's not possible!"

His catchphrases have seeped into the lexicon of -Washington, D.C. area sports fans, who revel in using them to describe a myriad of non-sports related events (ex. males observing a friend attempting to ask a woman for her phone number exclaim "Dagger!" or "Backbreaker!" when she can be seen rejecting the friend's advances) as well as debating the subtle and compelling distinction between a "Backbreaker" (a made basket at a critical juncture in a game that breaks any chance that the opposing team will win) and a "Dagger" (a made basket at a critical juncture in a game that stabs like a dagger at the opposing team's chance of victory).
