= Dennis DuVal =

American basketball player (born 1952)

Personal information
- Born: March 31, 1952 (age 74) Westbury, New York, U.S.
- Listed height: 6 ft 3 in (1.91 m)
- Listed weight: 175 lb (79 kg)

Career information
- High school: Westbury (Westbury, New York)
- College: Syracuse (1971–1974)
- NBA draft: 1974: 2nd round, 30th overall pick
- Drafted by: Washington Bullets
- Position: Point guard
- Number: 23, 21

Career history
- 1974–1975: Washington Bullets
- 1976: Atlanta Hawks

Career highlights
- Third-team All-American – AP (1974); No. 22 retired by Syracuse Orange
- Stats at NBA.com
- Stats at Basketball Reference

Dennis DuVal (born March 31, 1952), nicknamed "Sweet D" is a former National Basketball Association (NBA) player.

== College career ==
In 1970–71, Dennis played on the Syracuse Orange freshman basketball team. He averaged 19.2 points and 7.7 rebounds per game. Dennis joined the Syracuse varsity basketball team his sophomore season, and averaged 15.8 points and 4.8 rebounds per game. Dennis led Syracuse in scoring his junior season, averaging 19.6 points per game. He also led Syracuse in scoring his senior season, averaging 20.6 points per game. In his senior year at Syracuse University, Dennis was selected to the NCAA AP All-American third-team. When he graduated, he was second all-time in points for Syracuse behind only David Bing.

== Professional career ==
Dennis was drafted with the twelfth pick in the second round of the 1974 NBA draft by the Washington Bullets. Dennis was also selected by the Denver Nuggets in the 1974 ABA Draft. He was waived by the Bullets prior to the start of the 1975-76 NBA season. On January 31, 1976, Dennis was signed by the Atlanta Hawks. In his NBA career, Dennis averaged 1.9 points, 0.7 assists, and 0.6 rebounds per game.

== Post-playing career ==
Following his basketball career, Dennis became a police officer in Syracuse, New York. In 1990, he became the deputy police chief. In 2001, Dennis was named the Syracuse police chief. He retired from the Syracuse police force in 2004

In 2000, Dennis was selected to the Syracuse Men's Basketball All-Century Team.

Dennis is currently the Vice Chairman and Chief Operating Officer of Terradiol, a bio-pharmaceutical company which produces, manufactures, and distributes medical cannabis pharmaceuticals.

== Career statistics ==
Legend
GP	Games played	GS	Games started	MPG	Minutes per game
FG%	Field goal percentage	3P%	3-point field goal percentage	FT%	Free throw percentage
RPG	Rebounds per game	APG	Assists per game	SPG	Steals per game
BPG	Blocks per game	PPG	Points per game	**Bold**	Career high

=== NBA ===
==== Regular season ====
Year	Team	GP	MPG	FG%	FT%	RPG	APG	SPG	BPG	PPG
1974–75	Washington	**37**	3.7	**.369**	**.667**	**.6**	.4	.4	.1	1.6
1975–76	Atlanta	13	**10.0**	.349	**.667**	**.6**	**1.5**	**.5**	**.2**	**2.8**
Career		50	5.3	.361	.667	.6	.7	.4	.1	1.9

==== Playoffs ====
Year	Team	GP	MPG	FG%	FT%	RPG	APG	SPG	BPG	PPG
1975	Washington	5	2.8	.333	.500	.6	.6	.0	.0	1.4
