= 1967 NCAA Men's Basketball All-Americans =

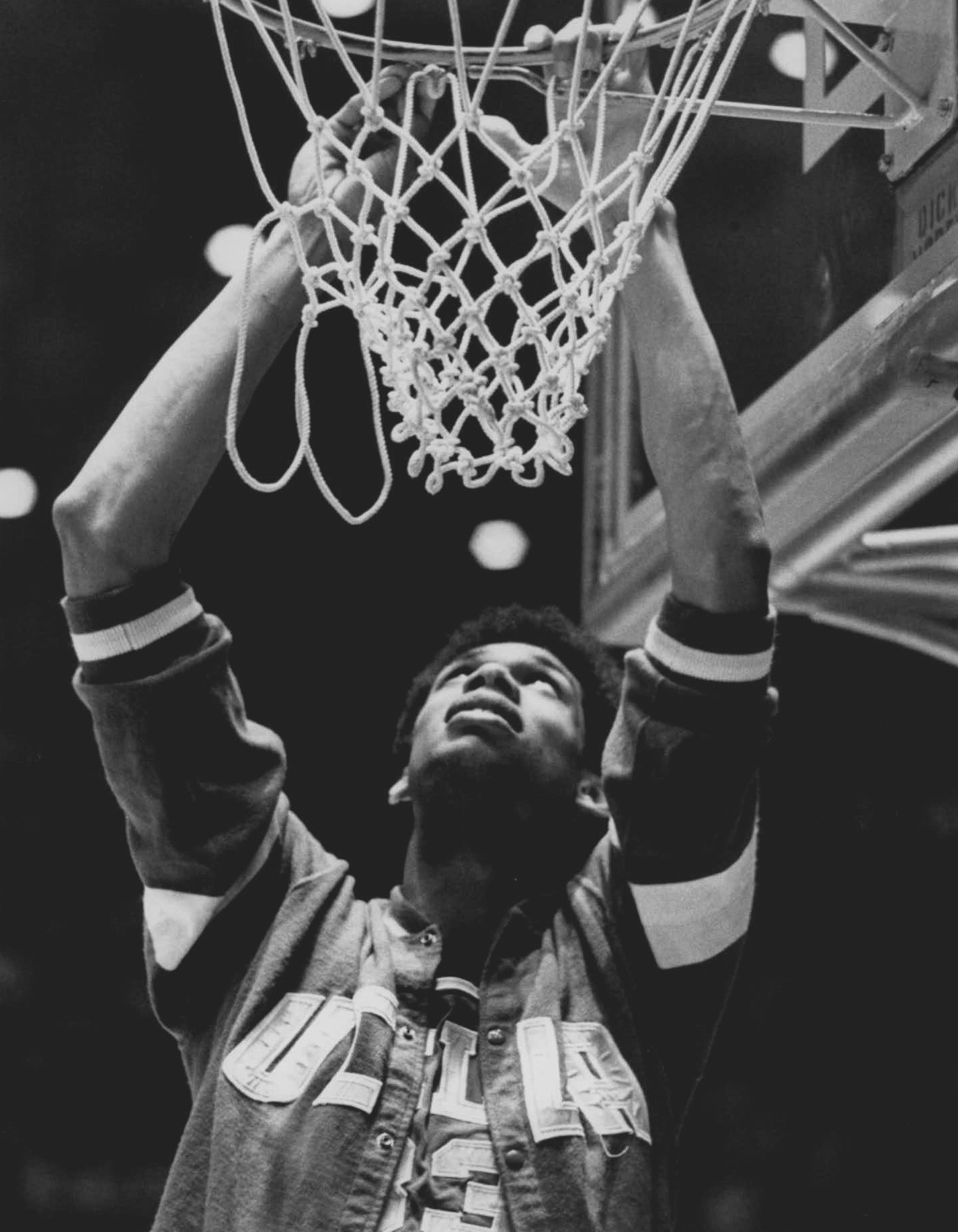
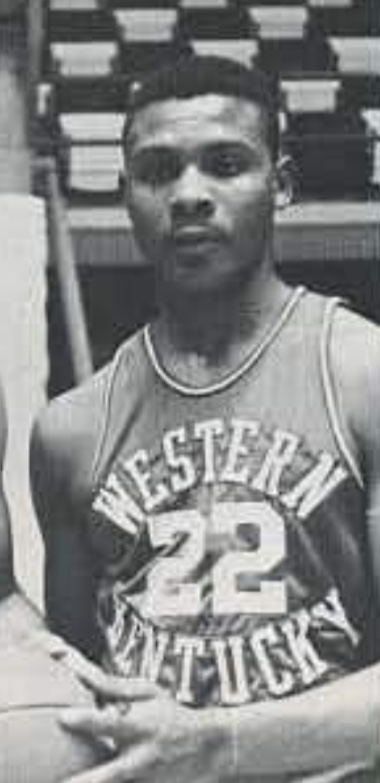
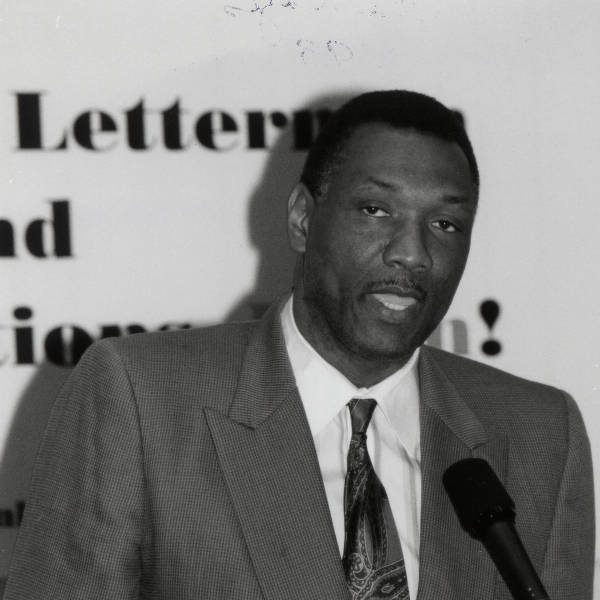
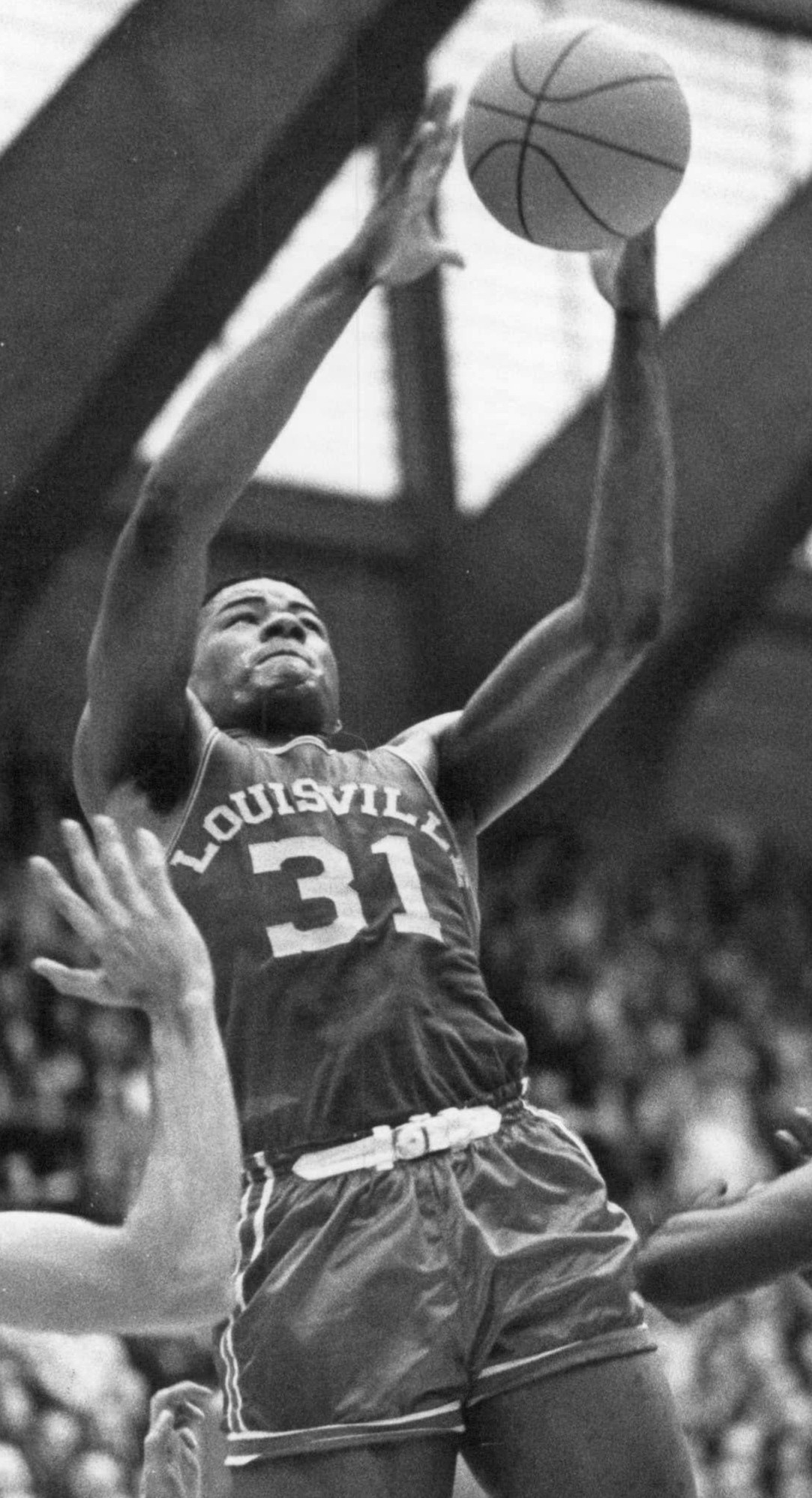
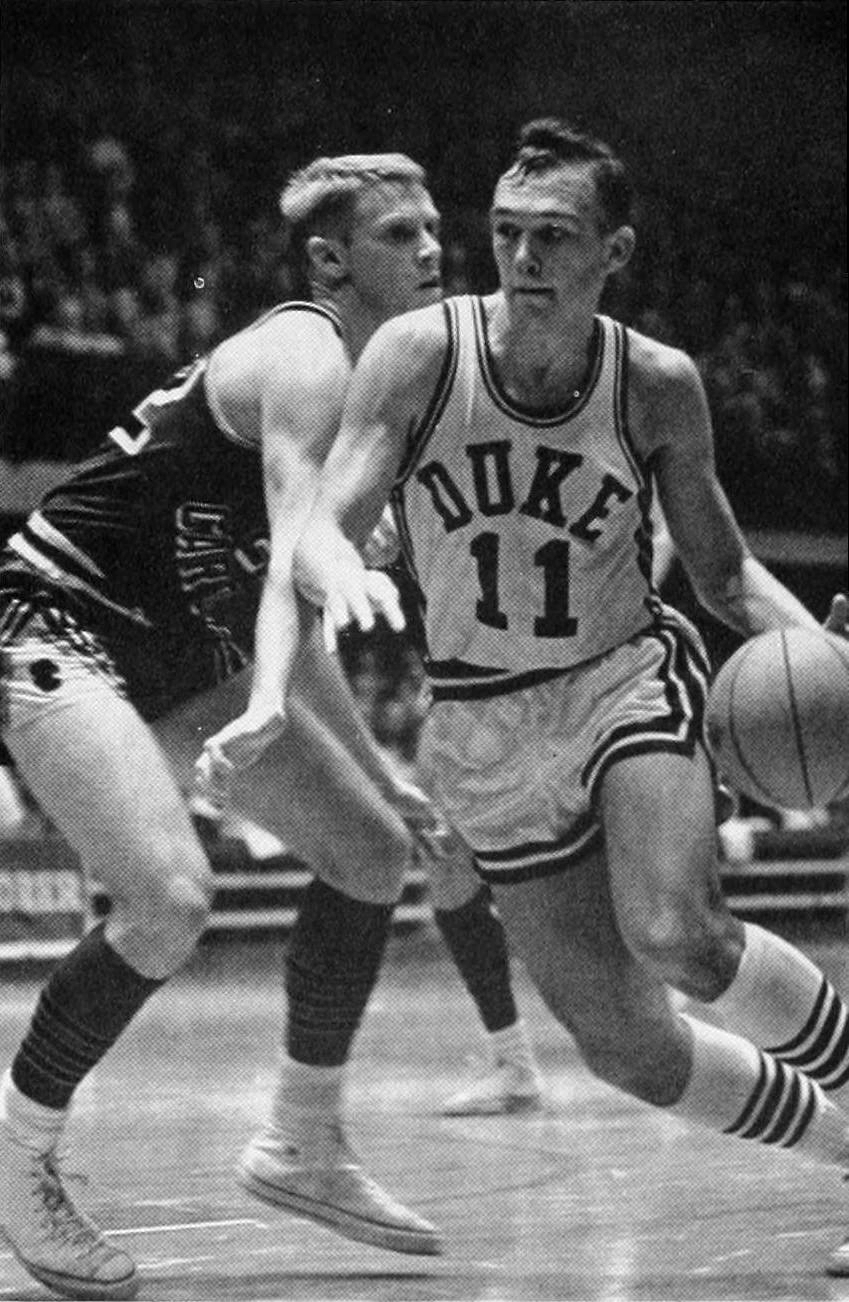
- Members of the 1967 consensus first team. Clockwise from top left: Alcindor, Haskins, Verga, Unseld, Hayes (not pictured: Lloyd, Walker).
- Awarded for: 1966–67 NCAA University Division men's basketball season

The consensus 1967 College Basketball All-American team, as determined by aggregating the results of four major All-American teams. To earn "consensus" status, a player must win honors from a majority of the following teams: the Associated Press, the USBWA, the United Press International and the National Association of Basketball Coaches.

== 1967 Consensus All-America team ==
Consensus First Team
| Player | Position | Class | Team |
|---|---|---|---|
| Lew Alcindor | C | Sophomore | UCLA |
| Clem Haskins | G | Senior | Western Kentucky |
| Elvin Hayes | F/C | Junior | Houston |
| Bob Lloyd | G | Senior | Rutgers |
| Wes Unseld | C | Senior | Louisville |
| Bob Verga | G | Senior | Duke |
| Jimmy Walker | G | Senior | Providence |

Consensus Second Team
| Player | Position | Class | Team |
|---|---|---|---|
| Louie Dampier | G | Senior | Kentucky |
| Mel Daniels | C | Senior | New Mexico |
| Sonny Dove | F | Senior | St. John's |
| Don May | G/F | Junior | Dayton |
| Larry Miller | F | Junior | North Carolina |

== Individual All-America teams ==
All-America Team
| All-America Team | First team | | Second team | | Third team | |
| All-America Team | Player | School | Player | School | Player | School |
|---|---|---|---|---|---|---|
| Associated Press | Lew Alcindor | UCLA | Louie Dampier | Kentucky | Butch Beard | Louisville |
| Associated Press | Clem Haskins | Western Kentucky | Bob Lloyd | Rutgers | Jim Burns | Northwestern |
| Associated Press | Elvin Hayes | Houston | Larry Miller | North Carolina | Mel Daniels | New Mexico |
| Associated Press | Wes Unseld | Louisville | Bob Verga | Duke | Sonny Dove | St. John's |
| Associated Press | Jimmy Walker | Providence | Ron Widby | Tennessee | David Lattin | Texas Western |
| USBWA | Lew Alcindor | UCLA | No second or third teams (10-man first team) | | | |
| USBWA | Mel Daniels | New Mexico | No second or third teams (10-man first team) | | | |
| USBWA | Clem Haskins | Western Kentucky | No second or third teams (10-man first team) | | | |
| USBWA | Elvin Hayes | Houston | No second or third teams (10-man first team) | | | |
| USBWA | Bob Lloyd | Rutgers | No second or third teams (10-man first team) | | | |
| USBWA | Don May | Dayton | No second or third teams (10-man first team) | | | |
| USBWA | Larry Miller | North Carolina | No second or third teams (10-man first team) | | | |
| USBWA | Wes Unseld | Louisville | No second or third teams (10-man first team) | | | |
| USBWA | Bob Verga | Duke | No second or third teams (10-man first team) | | | |
| USBWA | Jimmy Walker | Providence | No second or third teams (10-man first team) | | | |
| NABC | Lew Alcindor | UCLA | Mel Daniels | New Mexico | Cliff Anderson | Saint Joseph's |
| NABC | Elvin Hayes | Houston | Sonny Dove | St. John's | Jim Burns | Northwestern |
| NABC | Wes Unseld | Louisville | Clem Haskins | Western Kentucky | Louie Dampier | Kentucky |
| NABC | Bob Verga | Duke | Bob Lloyd | Rutgers | David Lattin | Texas Western |
| NABC | Jimmy Walker | Providence | Larry Miller | North Carolina | Bob Lewis | North Carolina |
| UPI | Lew Alcindor | UCLA | Butch Beard | Louisville | Louie Dampier | Kentucky |
| UPI | Elvin Hayes | Houston | Mel Daniels | New Mexico | Mal Graham | NYU |
| UPI | Bob Lloyd | Rutgers | Sonny Dove | St. John's | Don May | Dayton |
| UPI | Wes Unseld | Louisville | Clem Haskins | Western Kentucky | Larry Miller | North Carolina |
| UPI | Jimmy Walker | Providence | Bob Verga | Duke | Ron Widby | Tennessee |

AP Honorable Mention:

- Lucius Allen, UCLA
- Joe Allen, Bradley
- Cliff Anderson, Saint Joseph's
- Wes Bialosuknia, UConn
- Tom Boerwinkle, Tennessee
- Russ Critchfield, California
- Mal Graham, NYU
- Gary Gray, Oklahoma City
- Tom Hagan, Vanderbilt
- Shaler Halimon, Utah State
- Harry Holliness, Denver
- Merv Jackson, Utah
- Butch Joyner, Indiana
- Bob Lewis, North Carolina
- Don May, Dayton
- Steve Mix, Toledo
- Craig Raymond, BYU
- Don Smith, Iowa State
- Keith Swagerty, Pacific
- Chris Thomforde, Princeton
- Gary Walters, Princeton
- Michael Warren, UCLA
- Eldridge Webb, Tulsa
- Jo Jo White, Kansas
- Ron Williams, West Virginia
- Sam Williams, Iowa
- Tom Workman, Seattle

== See also ==
- 1966–67 NCAA University Division men's basketball season
