= 1974–75 Washington Bullets season =

NBA professional basketball team season

- Conference champions
- Division champions
- Head coach: K. C. Jones
- Arena: Capital Centre

Results
- Record: 60–22 (.732)
- Place: Division: 1st (Central); Conference: 2nd (Eastern)
- Playoff finish: NBA Finals (lost to Warriors 0–4)
- Stats at Basketball Reference

Local media
- Television: WTOP-TV
- Radio: WTOP

The 1974–75 Washington Bullets played in their 14th season, second in the Washington, D.C. area, and first as the Washington Bullets. After one season as the Capital Bullets, the team name was changed to Washington Bullets; they captured their sixth division title in seven years by posting a franchise-best record of 60–22 (.732). Washington was nearly unbeatable at home, posting a record of 36–5 (.878) at the Capital Centre in suburban Landover, Maryland.

The Bullets won their second Eastern Conference title, but similar to four years earlier, were swept in the NBA Finals in four games, this time by the underdog Golden State Warriors. The Bullets had the best team defensive rating in NBA history (91.3).

== Roster ==
1974–75 Washington Bullets roster
Players

Pos.	No.	Player	Height	Weight	DOB	From
SG	45	Phil Chenier	6 ft 3 in (1.91 m)	180 lb (82 kg)	1950-10-30	California
PG	23	Dennis DuVal	6 ft 3 in (1.91 m)	175 lb (79 kg)	1952-03-31	Syracuse
SF	21	Dick Gibbs	6 ft 5 in (1.96 m)	210 lb (95 kg)	1948-12-20	UTEP
SG	14	Clem Haskins	6 ft 3 in (1.91 m)	195 lb (88 kg)	1943-07-11	Western Kentucky
PF	11	Elvin Hayes	6 ft 9 in (2.06 m)	235 lb (107 kg)	1945-11-17	Houston
PG	15	Jimmy Jones	6 ft 4 in (1.93 m)	188 lb (85 kg)	1945-01-01	Grambling State
PF	22	Tom Kozelko	6 ft 8 in (2.03 m)	220 lb (100 kg)	1951-07-01	Toledo
PG	10	Kevin Porter	6 ft 0 in (1.83 m)	170 lb (77 kg)	1950-04-17	Saint Francis (PA)
SF	6	Mike Riordan	6 ft 4 in (1.93 m)	200 lb (91 kg)	1945-07-09	Providence
PF	33	Leonard Robinson	6 ft 7 in (2.01 m)	225 lb (102 kg)	1951-10-04	Tennessee State
C	41	Wes Unseld	6 ft 7 in (2.01 m)	245 lb (111 kg)	1946-03-14	Louisville
SG	20	Stan Washington	6 ft 4 in (1.93 m)	190 lb (86 kg)	1952-01-23	San Diego
SF	12	Nick Weatherspoon	6 ft 7 in (2.01 m)	197 lb (89 kg)	1950-07-20	Illinois

Coaches
Head coach
- K. C. Jones
Assistant(s)
- Bernie Bickerstaff

Legend
- (DP) Unsigned draft pick
- (FA) Free agent
- (S) Suspended
- Injured

== Regular season ==
=== Season standings ===
Central Division	W	L	PCT	GB	Home	Road	Div
y-Washington Bullets	60	22	.732	–	36–5	24–17	22–8
x-Houston Rockets	41	41	.500	19	29–12	12–29	16–14
Cleveland Cavaliers	40	42	.488	20	29–12	11–30	17–13
Atlanta Hawks	31	51	.378	29	22–19	9–32	11–19
New Orleans Jazz	23	59	.280	37	20–21	3–38	9–21

#	Eastern Conference				
#	Team	W	L	PCT	GB
1	z-Boston Celtics	60	22	.732	–
2	y-Washington Bullets	60	22	.732	–
3	x-Buffalo Braves	49	33	.598	11
4	x-Houston Rockets	41	41	.500	19
5	x-New York Knicks	40	42	.488	20
6	Cleveland Cavaliers	40	42	.488	20
7	Philadelphia 76ers	34	48	.415	26
8	Atlanta Hawks	31	51	.378	29
9	New Orleans Jazz	23	59	.280	37

Notes

- z, y – division champions
- x – clinched playoff spot

== Regular season ==
=== Game log ===
1974–75 game log
Total: 60–22 (home: 36–5; road: 24–17)
October: 7–1 (home: 4–0; road: 3–1)

Game	Date	Team	Score	High points	High rebounds	High assists	Location Attendance	Record
1	October 19; 8:05 p.m. EDT	New Orleans	W 110–92	Hayes (25)	Unseld (16)	Porter (15)	Capital Centre; 10,896	1–0
2	October 22; 8:35 p.m. EDT	@ Kansas City–Omaha	W 123–121	Hayes (35)	Hayes (14)	Hayes (7)	Municipal Auditorium; 5,385	2–0
3	October 23; 8:05 p.m. EDT	Houston	W 99–95	Chenier (27)	Unseld (13)	Unseld (7)	Capital Centre; 5,109	3–0
4	October 25; 9:00 p.m. EDT	@ Milwaukee	W 111–96	Chenier (29)	Unseld (15)	Porter (11)	Milwaukee Arena; 10,938	4–0
5	October 26; 8:05 p.m. EDT	Milwaukee	W 101–95	Hayes (31)	Unseld (16)	Porter, Riordan (7)	Capital Centre; 7,166	5–0
6	October 29; 8:30 p.m. EST	@ Chicago	W 96–80	Chenier (27)	Hayes (12)	Porter (7)	Chicago Stadium; 4,413	6–0
7	October 30; 8:05 p.m. EST	New York	W 94–86	Hayes (21)	Unseld (22)	Porter (6)	Capital Centre; 7,842	7–0
8	October 31; 9:05 p.m. EST	@ Houston	L 92–95	Chenier (29)	Unseld (15)	Porter, Unseld (6)	Hofheinz Pavilion; 2,164	7–1

November: 9–5 (home: 5–3; road: 4–2)

Game	Date	Team	Score	High points	High rebounds	High assists	Location Attendance	Record
9	November 2; 8:05 p.m. EST	Phoenix	W 108–94	Riordan (39)	Unseld (21)	Porter (7)	Capital Centre; 9,168	8–1
10	November 6; 8:05 p.m. EST	Cleveland	L 99–107	Unseld (21)	Hayes (15)	Porter, Riordan (4)	Capital Centre; 5,110	8–2
11	November 9; 8:05 p.m. EST	Chicago	W 96–89	Jones (21)	Unseld (14)	Porter (11)	Capital Centre; 8,083	9–2
12	November 13; 8:05 p.m. EST	Kansas City–Omaha	W 118–81	Chenier (25)	Unseld (15)	Porter (13)	Capital Centre; 5,521	10–2
13	November 15; 8:35 p.m. EST	@ New Orleans	W 104–95	Hayes (34)	Hayes (14)	Chenier (6)	New Orleans Municipal Auditorium; 5,275	11–2
14	November 16; 8:05 p.m. EST	Boston	L 109–124	Hayes (33)	Unseld (16)	Porter (7)	Capital Centre; 16,204	11–3
15	November 19; 8:05 p.m. EST	@ New York	L 85–86	Hayes (24)	Hayes (16)	Porter (6)	Madison Square Garden; 18,444	11–4
16	November 20; 8:05 p.m. EST	Buffalo	L 104–115	Hayes (30)	Hayes (14)	Porter (11)	Capital Centre; 8,640	11–5
17	November 22; 11:00 p.m. EST	@ Portland	W 117–99	Chenier (36)	Hayes (12)	Porter (11)	Memorial Coliseum; 11,868	12–5
18	November 24; 10:00 p.m. EST	@ Los Angeles	W 111–108	Chenier, Jones (24)	Unseld (15)	Hayes (5)	The Forum; 11,857	13–5
19	November 26; 8:05 p.m. EST	@ Atlanta	L 102–119	Chenier, Hayes (30)	Hayes (12)	Porter (7)	The Omni; 4,268	13–6
20	November 27; 8:05 p.m. EST	Atlanta	W 114–104	Chenier (31)	Unseld (19)	porter (9)	Capital Centre; 7,012	14–6
21	November 29; 8:00 p.m. EST	@ Buffalo	W 96–93	Chenier (29)	Hayes, Unseld (13)	Riordan (6)	Buffalo Memorial Auditorium; 16,209	15–6
22	November 30; 8:05 p.m. EST	Seattle	W 122–90	Hayes (20)	Unseld (13)	Porter (10)	Capital Centre; 8,865	16–6

December: 10–3 (home: 7–0; road: 3–3)

Game	Date	Team	Score	High points	High rebounds	High assists	Location Attendance	Record
23	December 4; 8:05 p.m. EST	Portland	W 114–87	Hayes (25)	Unseld (21)	Porter, Unseld (6)	Capital Centre; 6,306	17–6
24	December 7; 8:05 p.m. EST	Detroit	W 94–89	Chenier (31)	Unseld (16)	Porter (5)	Capital Centre; 9,094	18–6
25	December 8; 7:35 p.m. EST	@ Cleveland	W 88–75	Chenier (24)	Hayes (16)	Jones (8)	Richfield Coliseum; 8,148	19–6
26	December 11; 7:35 p.m. EST	@ Detroit	L 89–103	Chenier (18)	Unseld (6)	Porter (10)	Cobo Arena; 5,376	19–7
27	December 13; 7:30 p.m. EST	@ Boston	W 108–89	Hayes (24)	Unseld (15)	Porter (10)	Boston Garden; 15,320	20–7
28	December 14; 8:05 p.m. EST	Golden State	W 99–91	Chenier (29)	Unseld (17)	Porter (11)	Capital Centre; 10,396	20–8
29	December 17; 8:05 p.m. EST	@ Atlanta	L 85–96	Chenier (20)	Robinson (8)	Porter (4)	The Omni; 3,047	21–8
30	December 18; 8:05 p.m. EST	New Orleans	W 113–90	Chenier (19)	Hayes (15)	Porter (8)	Capital Centre; 4,227	22–8
31	December 20; 9:05 p.m. EST	@ Houston	L 91–116	Chenier (23)	Hayes (6)	Hayes, Jones (5)	Hofheinz Pavilion; 3,875	22–9
32	December 21; 8:05 p.m. EST	Philadelphia	W 117–101	Porter, Riordan (29)	Unseld (18)	Porter (10)	Capital Centre; 5,792	23–9
33	December 23; 9:00 p.m. EST	@ Milwaukee	W 106–103 (OT)	Hayes (34)	Unseld (25)	Porter (8)	Milwaukee Arena; 10,938	24–9
34	December 25; 8:05 p.m. EST	Atlanta	W 110–92	Riordan (23)	Unseld (21)	Chenier (7)	Capital Centre; 10,341	25–9
35	December 30; 8:05 p.m. EST	Cleveland	W 103–90	Riordan (27)	Unseld (28)	Porter (10)	Capital Centre; 8,101	26–9

January: 10–4 (home: 5–0; road: 5–4)

Game	Date	Team	Score	High points	High rebounds	High assists	Location Attendance	Record
36	January 1; 11:00 p.m. EST	@ Seattle	L 118–123 (OT)	Hayes (29)	Unseld (25)	Unseld (6)	Seattle Center Coliseum; 12,363	26–10
37	January 4; 11:05 p.m. EST	@ Golden State	L 96–104	Riordan (19)	Hayes (15)	Porter (9)	Oakland–Alameda County Coliseum Arena; 12,787	25–12
38	January 5; 10:00 p.m. EST	@ Los Angeles	L 109–112 (OT)	Riordan (34)	Unseld (17)	Porter (13)	The Forum; 13,386	26–12
39	January 8; 9:30 p.m. EST	@ Phoenix	W 102–95	Riordan (31)	Unseld (16)	Unseld (8)	Arizona Veterans Memorial Coliseum; 6,770	27–12
40	January 9; 9:05 p.m. EST	@ Houston	W 102–94	Hayes (23)	Hayes (15)	Porter (8)	Hofheinz Pavilion; 4,216	28–12
41	January 11; 8:05 p.m. EST	Los Angeles	W 102–90	Chenier (26)	Unseld (22)	Porter (10)	Capital Centre; 13,868	29–12
All-Star Break
42	January 16; 8:05 p.m. EST	@ Atlanta	L 85–108	Chenier (16)	Unseld (15)	Chenier (7)	The Omni; 3,034	29–13
43	January 17; 8:05 p.m. EST	@ Philadelphia	W 103–92	Hayes (31)	Unseld (16)	Porter (10)	The Spectrum; 9,176	30–13
44	January 18; 8:05 p.m. EST	Golden State	W 125–101	Riordan (32)	Unseld (15)	Porter, Unseld (7)	Capital Centre; 19,035	31–13
45	January 21; 8:05 p.m. EST	@ Cleveland	W 97–88	Riordan (22)	Unseld (12)	Porter (6)	Richfield Coliseum; 4,718	32–13
46	January 22; 8:05 p.m. EST	Kansas City–Omaha	W 97–88	Chenier (33)	Unseld (17)	Porter (9)	Capital Centre; 4,719	33–13
47	January 25; 8:05 p.m. EST	Cleveland	W 94–92	Chenier (25)	Unseld (20)	Unseld (10)	Capital Centre; 7,178	34–13
48	January 26; 1:35 p.m. EST	Houston	W 118–90	Hayes (24)	Unseld (15)	Chenier (8)	Capital Centre; 7,939	35–13
49	January 31; 8:35 p.m. EST	@ New Orleans	W 106–101	Hayes (31)	Unseld (16)	Porter (8)	Loyola Field House; 2,812	36–13

February: 12–4 (home: 6–0; road: 6–4)

Game	Date	Team	Score	High points	High rebounds	High assists	Location Attendance	Record
50	February 2; 2:00 p.m. EST	@ Chicago	L 80–97	Chenier (19)	Hayes (11)	Jones (4)	Chicago Stadium; 10,885	36–14
51	February 4; 9:30 p.m. EST	@ Phoenix	L 89–90	Hayes (27)	Unseld (12)	Porter (11)	Arizona Veterans Memorial Coliseum; 4,263	36–15
52	February 6; 11:05 p.m. EST	@ Golden State	W 98–97	Chenier (31)	Hayes (16)	Porter (8)	Oakland–Alameda County Coliseum Arena; 12,787	37–15
53	February 7; 11:00 p.m. EST	@ Seattle	W 99–76	Chenier (28)	Unseld (19)	Porter (9)	Seattle Center Coliseum; 12,720	38–15
54	February 8; 11:00 p.m. EST	@ Portland	L 96–100	Hayes (25)	Hayes (12)	Unseld (6)	Memorial Coliseum; 8,405	38–16
55	February 12; 8:05 p.m. EST	Milwaukee	W 112–108 (OT)	Hayes (35)	Unseld (21)	Unseld (9)	Capital Centre; 15,331	39–16
56	February 15; 8:05 p.m. EST	@ New York	W 108–106 (OT)	Hayes (31)	Hayes (16)	Porter (7)	Madison Square Garden; 19,694	40–16
57	February 16; 3:15 p.m. EST	New York	W 125–104	Hayes (33)	Unseld (18)	Porter (11)	Capital Centre; 19,035	41–16
58	February 19; 8:05 p.m. EST	Phoenix	W 120–97	Hayes (32)	Hayes (15)	Porter (7), Unseld (7)	Capital Centre; 6,201	42–16
59	February 20; 8:05 p.m. EST	@ Cleveland	L 95–106	Chenier (29)	Unseld (10)	Porter (6)	Richfield Coliseum; 6,728	42–17
60	February 21; 7:35 p.m. EST	@ Detroit	W 121–96	Chenier (30)	Hayes (15)	Porter (11)	Cobo Arena; 9,571	43–17
61	February 23; 1:00 p.m. EST	Portland	W 113–98	Chenier, Hayes (21)	Unseld (15)	Hayes (7)	Capital Centre; 8,294	44–17
62	February 25; 8:00 p.m. EST	@ Buffalo	W 111–93	Hayes (31)	Unseld (17)	Porter (14)	Buffalo Memorial Auditorium; 13,964	45–17
63	February 26; 8:05 p.m. EST	Seattle	W 104–98	Hayes (39)	Hayes (19)	Chenier (7)	Capital Centre; 6,202	46–17
64	February 28; 7:05 p.m. EST	Detroit	W 106–95	Hayes (35)	Hayes (12)	Chenier (8)	Capital Centre; 11,121	47–17

March: 9–4 (home: 6–2; road: 3–2)

Game	Date	Team	Score	High points	High rebounds	High assists	Location Attendance	Record
65	March 2; 1:00 p.m. EST	Los Angeles	W 117–104	Chenier (27)	Hayes (15)	Porter (21)	Capital Centre; 8,020	48–17
66	March 5; 8:05 p.m. EST	Atlanta	W 118–112	Hayes (30)	Hayes (15)	Porter (22)	Capital Centre; 6,266	49–17
67	March 8; 8:05 p.m. EST	@ Philadelphia	W 113–92	Chenier (28)	Hayes (14)	Hayes, Riordan (5)	The Spectrum; 7,848	50–17
68	March 9; 1:30 p.m. EST	Philadelphia	L 100–113	Hayes (28)	Hayes (12)	Porter (9)	Capital Centre; 8,473	50–18
69	March 11; 8:05 p.m. EST	@ Atlanta	W 99–87	Chenier (38)	Hayes (15)	Porter (10)	The Omni; 2,955	51–18
70	March 12; 8:05 p.m. EST	Houston	W 115–88	Riordan (26)	Hayes (10)	Kozelko (8)	Capital Centre; 6,059	52–18
71	March 14; 8:35 p.m. EST	@ Kansas City–Omaha (at Omaha, NE)	L 102–103	Chenier (32)	Hayes (26)	Chenier, Hayes, Riordan, Robinson (3)	Omaha Civic Auditorium; 8,524	52–19
72	March 18; 8:05 p.m. EST	@ Cleveland	L 98–112	Riordan (20)	Kozelko (9)	Porter (11)	Richfield Coliseum; 6,823	52–20
73	March 19; 8:05 p.m. EST	Boston	W 97–80	Hayes (29)	Hayes (12)	Porter (11)	Capital Centre; 19,035	53–20
74	March 21; 8:35 p.m. EST	@ New Orleans	W 122–109	Hayes (28)	Hayes (13)	Porter (9)	New Orleans Municipal Auditorium; 6,273	54–20
75	March 22; 8:05 p.m. EST	Cleveland	W 100–97	Hayes (28)	Hayes (13)	Porter (10)	Capital Centre; 8,471	55–20
76	March 26; 8:05 p.m. EST	Buffalo	L 91–94	Chenier (21)	Unseld (17)	Porter, Riordan (6)	Capital Centre; 15,226	56–20
77	March 30; 2:00 p.m. EST	Chicago	W 94–82	Hayes (37)	Hayes, Unseld (11)	Porter (11)	Capital Centre; 10,149	56–21

April: 4–1 (home: 3–0; road: 1–1)

Game	Date	Team	Score	High points	High rebounds	High assists	Location Attendance	Record
78	April 1; 8:35 p.m. EST	@ New Orleans	W 110–101	Hayes (33)	Unseld (16)	Porter (10)	New Orleans Municipal Auditorium; 7,312	57–21
79	April 2; 8:05 p.m. EST	Houston	W 112–85	Hayes (33)	Unseld (18)	Porter (13)	Capital Centre; 7,748	58–21
80	April 4; 7:30 p.m. EST	@ Boston	L 94–95	Porter (19)	Hayes (14)	Porter (9)	Boston Garden; 15,320	58–22
81	April 5; 8:05 p.m. EST	Atlanta	W 123–115	Hayes (31)	Unseld (22)	Porter (11)	Capital Centre; 8,273	59–22
82	April 6; 1:05 p.m. EST	New Orleans	W 119–103	Hayes (23)	Unseld (30)	Jones, Unseld (5)	Capital Centre; 13,267	60–22

1974–75 schedule

== Player stats ==
Note: GP=Games played; MP=Minutes Played; FG=Field Goals; FGA=Field Goal Attempts; FG%=Field Goal Percentage; FT=Free Throws; FTA=Free Throws Attempts; FT%=Free Throw Percentage; ORB=Offensive Rebounds; DRB=Defensive Rebounds; TRB=Total Rebounds; AST=Assists; STL=Steals; BLK=Blocks; PF=Personal Fouls; PTS=Points; AVG=Average

Player	GP	MP	FG	FGA	FG%	FT	FTA	FT%	ORB	DRB	TRB	AST	STL	BLK	PF	PTS	AVG
Hayes	82	3465	739	1668	.443	409	534	.766	221	786	1004	206	158	187	238	1887	23.0
Chenier	77	2869	690	1533	.450	301	365	.825	74	218	292	248	176	58	158	1681	21.8
Riordan	74	2191	520	1057	.492	98	117	.838	90	194	284	198	72	6	238	1138	15.4
Porter	81	2589	406	827	.491	131	186	.704	55	97	152	650	152	11	320	943	11.6
Unseld	73	2904	273	544	.502	126	184	.685	318	759	1077	297	115	68	180	672	9.2
Weatherspoon	82	1347	256	562	.456	103	138	.746	132	214	346	51	65	21	212	615	7.5
Jones	73	1424	207	400	.518	103	142	.725	36	101	137	162	76	10	190	517	7.1
Robinson	76	995	191	393	.486	60	115	.522	94	207	301	40	36	32	132	442	5.8
Haskins	70	702	115	290	.397	53	63	.841	29	51	80	79	23	6	73	283	4.0
Gibbs	59	424	74	190	.389	48	64	.750	26	35	61	19	12	3	60	196	3.3
Kozelko	73	754	60	167	.359	31	36	.861	50	90	140	41	28	5	125	151	2.1
DuVal	37	137	24	65	.369	12	18	.667	8	15	23	14	16	2	34	60	1.6
Washington	1	4	0	1	.000	0	0		0	0	0	0	0	0	1	0	0.0

== Team stats ==
Note: G=Games; MP=Minutes Played; FG=Field Goals; FGA=Field Goal Attempts; FG%=Field Goal Percentage; FT=Free Throws; FTA=Free Throw Attempts; FT%=Free Throw Percentage; ORB=Offensive Rebounds; DRB=Defensive Rebounds; TRB=Total Rebounds; AST=Assists; STL=Steals; BLK=Blocks; TOV=Turnovers; PF=Personal Fouls; PTS=Points

	G	MP	FG	FGA	FG%	FT	FTA	FT%	ORB	DRB	TRB	AST	STL	BLK	TOV	PF	PTS
Team	82	19805	3555	7697	.462	1475	1962	.752	1133	2764	3897	2005	929	409	1594	1961	8585
Team/G		241.5	43.4	93.9	.462	18.0	23.9	.752	13.8	33.7	47.5	24.5	11.3	5.0	19.4	23.9	104.7
Lg Rank		6	3	4	8	14	15	12	10	5	7	7	2	3	9	7	5
Year/Year		0.4%	2.2%	-2.4%	+.021	5.9%	5.0	+.006	-11.9%	-4.3%	-6.6%	13.3%	32.1%	-7.3%	1.7%	12.3%	2.8%
Opponent	82	19805	3249	7415	.438	1499	1967	.762	1184	2819	4003	1811	710	259	1842	2004	7997
Opponent/G		241.5	39.6	90.4	.438	18.3	24.0	.762	14.4	34.4	48.8	22.1	8.7	3.2	22.5	24.4	97.5
Lg Rank		6	2	8	1	5	6	8	11	15	14	4	8	1	2	10	2
Year/Year		0.4%	-7.1%	-4.4%	-.012	21.0%	20.0	+.006	-1.8%	-3.3%	-2.9%	-4.7%	9.1%	-26.0%	11.6%	8.9%	-2.8%

== Playoffs ==
1975 playoff game log
Eastern Conference Semifinals: 4–3 (home: 3–1; road: 1–2)

Game	Date	Team	Score	High points	High rebounds	High assists	Location Attendance	Series
1	April 10; 8:05 p.m. EST	Buffalo	L 102–113	Chenier (23)	Hayes (9)	Jones (5)	Capital Centre; 17,140	0–1
2	April 12; 8:00 p.m. EST	@ Buffalo	W 120–106	Hayes (34)	Unseld (25)	Porter (10)	Buffalo Memorial Auditorium; 17,189	1–1
3	April 16; 8:05 p.m. EST	Buffalo	W 111–96	Elvin Hayes (30)	Unseld (18)	Porter (13)	Capital Centre; 19,035	2–1
4	April 18; 9:00 p.m. EST	@ Buffalo	L 102–108	Weatherspoon (21)	Unseld (23)	Porter (10)	Buffalo Memorial Auditorium; 15,307	2–2
5	April 20; 1:00 p.m. EST	Buffalo	W 97–93	Hayes (46)	Hayes, Unseld (12)	Porter (8)	Capital Centre; 18,820	3–2
6	April 23; 8:00 p.m. EST	@ Buffalo	L 96–102	Chenier (25)	Unseld (12)	Chenier, Unseld (6)	Buffalo Memorial Auditorium; 15,172	3–3
7	April 25; 8:05 p.m. EST	Buffalo	W 115–96	Chenier (39)	Unseld (12)	Porter (8)	Capital Centre; 19,035	4–3

Eastern Conference Finals: 4–2 (home: 3–0; road: 1–2)

Game	Date	Team	Score	High points	High rebounds	High assists	Location Attendance	Series
1	April 27; 2:30 p.m. EDT	@ Boston	W 100–95	Hayes (34)	Unseld (14)	Porter (7)	Boston Garden; 15,320	1–0
2	April 30; 8:05 p.m. EDT	Boston	W 117–92	Hayes (29)	Unseld (16)	Porter (6)	Capital Centre; 19,035	2–0
3	May 3; 2:30 p.m. EDT	@ Boston	L 90–101	Hayes (23)	Unseld (15)	Porter (5)	Boston Garden; 15,320	2–1
4	May 7; 8:05 p.m. EDT	Boston	W 119–108	Chenier (27)	Unseld (25)	Unseld (7)	Capital Centre; 19,035	3–1
5	May 9; 7:30 p.m. EDT	@ Boston	L 99–103	Chenier (32)	Unseld (13)	Porter (6)	Boston Garden; 15,320	3–2
6	May 11; 3:00 p.m. EDT	Boston	W 98–92	Chenier (24)	Unseld (17)	Porter (11)	Capital Centre; 19,035	4–2

NBA Finals: 0–4 (home: 0–2; road: 0–2)

Game	Date	Team	Score	High points	High rebounds	High assists	Location Attendance	Series
1	May 18; 3:00 p.m. EDT	Golden State	L 95–101	Hayes (29)	Hayes, Unseld (16)	Unseld (6)	Capital Centre; 19,035	0–1
2	May 20; 9:00 p.m. EDT	@ Golden State (at San Francisco, CA)	L 91–92	Chenier (30)	Unseld (20)	Porter (8)	Cow Palace; 13,225	0–2
3	May 23; 9:00 p.m. EDT	@ Golden State (at San Francisco, CA)	L 101–109	Hayes (24)	Unseld (15)	Porter (6)	Cow Palace; 13,225	0–3
4	May 25; 3:00 p.m. EDT	Golden State	L 95–96	Chenier (26)	Unseld (16)	Chenier (11)	Capital Centre; 19,035	0–4

1975 schedule

== Playoffs player stats ==
Note: GP=Games played; MP=Minutes Played; FG=Field Goals; FGA=Field Goal Attempts; FG%=Field Goal Percentage; FT=Free Throws; FTA=Free Throw Attempts; FT%=Free Throw Percentage; ORB=Offensive Rebounds; DRB=Defensive Rebounds; TRB=Total Rebounds; AST=Assists; STL=Steals; BLK=Blocks; PF=Personal Fouls; PTS=Points; AVG=Average

Player	GP	MP	FG	FGA	FG%	FT	FTA	FT%	ORB	DRB	TRB	AST	STL	BLK	PF	PTS	AVG
Hayes	17	751	174	372	.468	86	127	.677	46	140	186	37	26	39	70	434	25.5
Chenier	17	692	155	330	.470	102	114	.895	18	58	76	54	22	11	45	412	24.2
Porter	17	625	99	197	.503	46	69	.667	13	28	41	124	21	0	73	244	14.4
Unseld	17	734	71	130	.546	40	61	.656	65	211	276	64	15	20	39	182	10.7
Weatherspoon	17	404	70	136	.515	35	43	.814	25	56	81	16	14	2	56	175	10.3
Riordan	17	378	60	151	.397	14	18	.778	12	29	41	27	16	2	49	134	7.9
Jones	11	206	29	64	.453	10	11	.909	5	17	22	21	16	1	21	68	6.2
Haskins	13	75	15	28	.536	5	8	.625	5	2	7	4	2	1	17	35	2.7
Robinson	17	130	14	42	.333	7	14	.500	11	29	40	6	6	10	21	35	2.1
DuVal	5	14	3	9	.333	1	2	.500	0	3	3	3	0	0	1	7	1.4
Gibbs	6	17	3	10	.300	2	2	1.000	0	1	1	2	3	0	2	8	1.3
Kozelko	13	54	5	11	.455	4	5	.800	4	3	7	1	0	0	8	14	1.1

== Awards and honors ==
- Elvin Hayes, All-NBA First Team
- Phil Chenier, All-NBA Second Team
- Elvin Hayes, NBA All-Defensive Second Team
