= Wes Unseld =

American basketball player and coach (1946–2020)

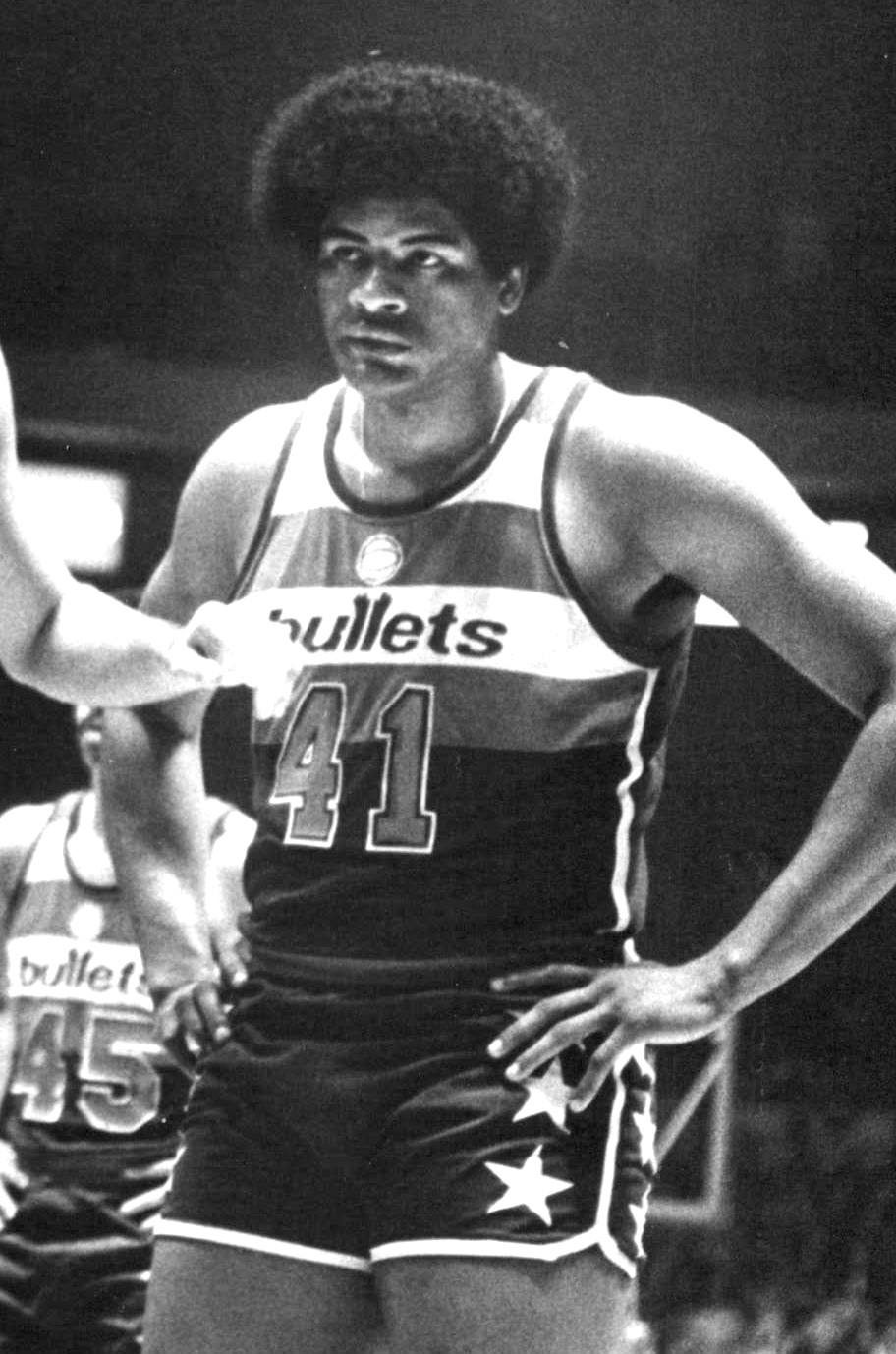
- Unseld with the Washington Bullets in 1975

Personal information
- Born: March 14, 1946 Louisville, Kentucky, U.S.
- Died: June 2, 2020 (aged 74) Baltimore, Maryland, U.S.
- Listed height: 6 ft 7 in (2.01 m)
- Listed weight: 245 lb (111 kg)

Career information
- High school: Seneca (Louisville, Kentucky)
- College: Louisville (1965–1968)
- NBA draft: 1968: 1st round, 2nd overall pick
- Drafted by: Baltimore Bullets
- Playing career: 1968–1981
- Position: Center
- Number: 41
- Coaching career: 1987–1994

Career history

Playing
- 1968–1981: Baltimore / Capital / Washington Bullets

Career highlights
- NBA champion (1978); NBA Finals MVP (1978); NBA Most Valuable Player (1969); 5× NBA All-Star (1969, 1971–1973, 1975); All-NBA First Team (1969); NBA Rookie of the Year (1969); NBA All-Rookie First Team (1969); NBA rebounding leader (1975); NBA anniversary team (50th, 75th); No. 41 retired by Washington Wizards; J. Walter Kennedy Citizenship Award (1975); 2× Consensus first-team All-American (1967, 1968); 3× First-team All-MVC (1966–1968); No. 31 retired by Louisville Cardinals; First-team Parade All-American (1964); Kentucky Mr. Basketball (1964)

Career NBA playing statistics
- Points: 10,624 (10.8 ppg)
- Rebounds: 13,769 (14.0 rpg)
- Assists: 3,822 (3.9 apg)
- Stats at NBA.com
- Stats at Basketball Reference

Career coaching record
- NBA: 202–345 (.369)
- Record at Basketball Reference
- Basketball Hall of Fame
- Collegiate Basketball Hall of Fame

Westley Sissel Unseld Sr. (March 14, 1946 – June 2, 2020) was an American professional basketball player, coach and executive. He spent his entire National Basketball Association (NBA) career with the Baltimore/Capital/Washington Bullets. Unseld played college basketball for the Louisville Cardinals and was selected with the second overall pick by the Bullets in the 1968 NBA draft. Known as "The Incredible Hulk" and "The Oak Tree" because of his immense physical presence, Unseld was named the NBA Most Valuable Player and NBA Rookie of the Year during his rookie season and joined Wilt Chamberlain as the only two players in NBA history to accomplish the feat. He won an NBA championship with the Bullets in 1978 and the Finals MVP award to go with it.

After his retirement as a player in 1981, Unseld worked with the Bullets-Wizards organization as a vice president, head coach and general manager.

Unseld was inducted into the Naismith Memorial Basketball Hall of Fame in 1988 and the National Collegiate Basketball Hall of Fame in 2006. His son, Wes Unseld Jr., is currently an assistant coach for the Chicago Bulls.

== Early life ==
Unseld was born in Louisville, Kentucky, to Charles and Cornelia Unseld as one of nine children. His father was a prizefighter, construction worker, oilman, and baseball player for the Indianapolis Clowns.

Unseld starred for the Seneca High School team that won Kentucky state championships in 1963 and 1964. He was recruited by over 100 colleges, and became the first African-American athlete to be offered an athletic scholarship to the University of Kentucky in Lexington. Integration leaders in Louisville tried to persuade Unseld to attend the University of Kentucky and stated that "it would be good for Kentucky and the Southeastern Conference," but Unseld opted to stay in town and attend the University of Louisville, which was racially integrated.

== College career ==
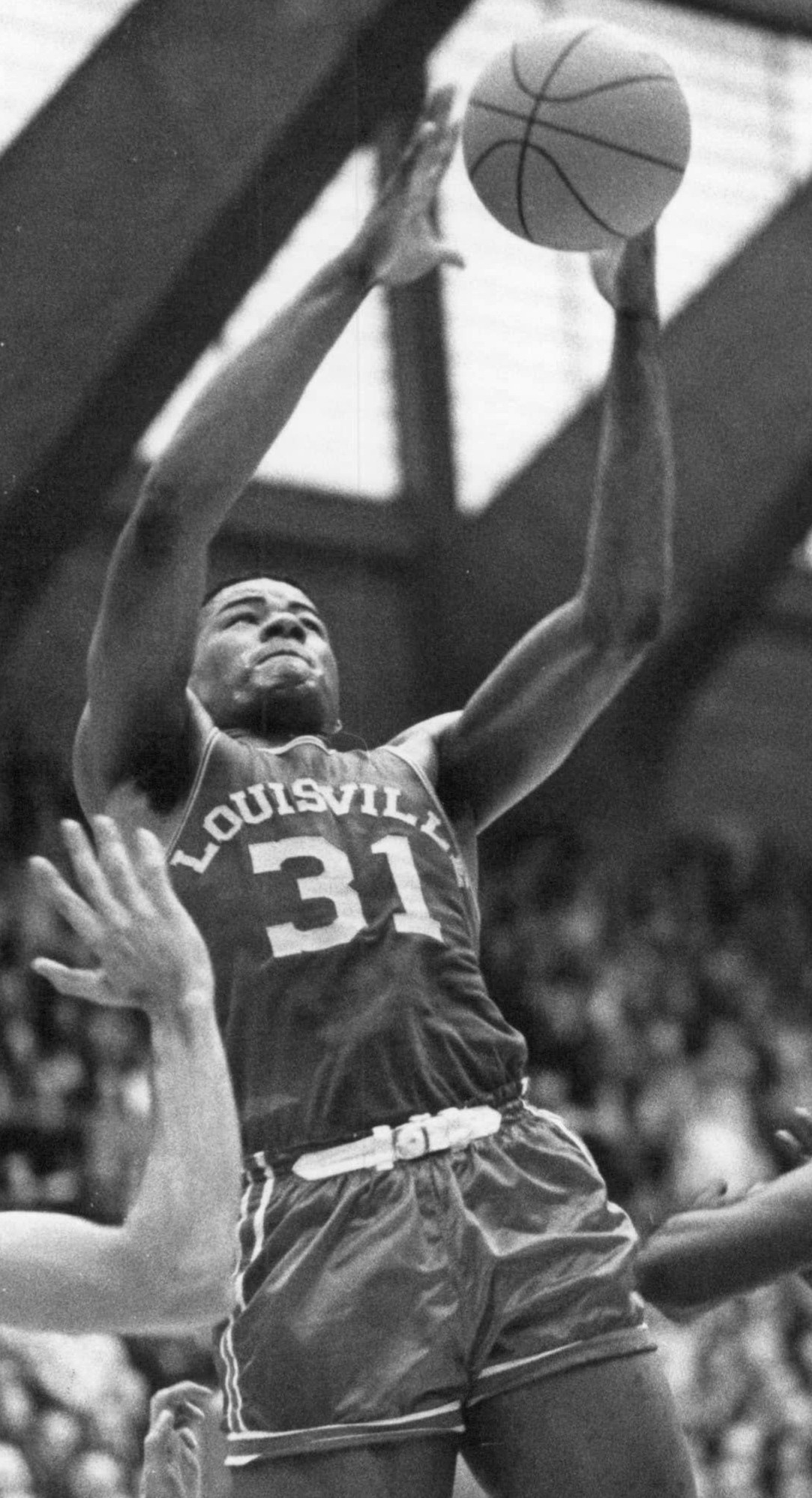
Unseld grabs a rebound during a 1967 game with the Louisville Cardinals

Unseld played center for the school's freshman team and averaged 35.8 points and 23.6 rebounds over 14 games. He lettered for Louisville as a sophomore (1965–66), junior (1966–67), and senior (1967–68), scored 1,686 points (20.6 average) and grabbed 1,551 rebounds (18.9 average) over 82 games. He led the Missouri Valley Conference in rebounding all three years.

Unseld earned NCAA All-American honors in 1967 and 1968 and led Louisville to a 60–22 record during his collegiate career, making trips to the National Invitation Tournament (NIT) in 1966 and the NCAA tournament in 1967 and 1968. He was a member of Alpha Phi Alpha fraternity.

== Professional career ==
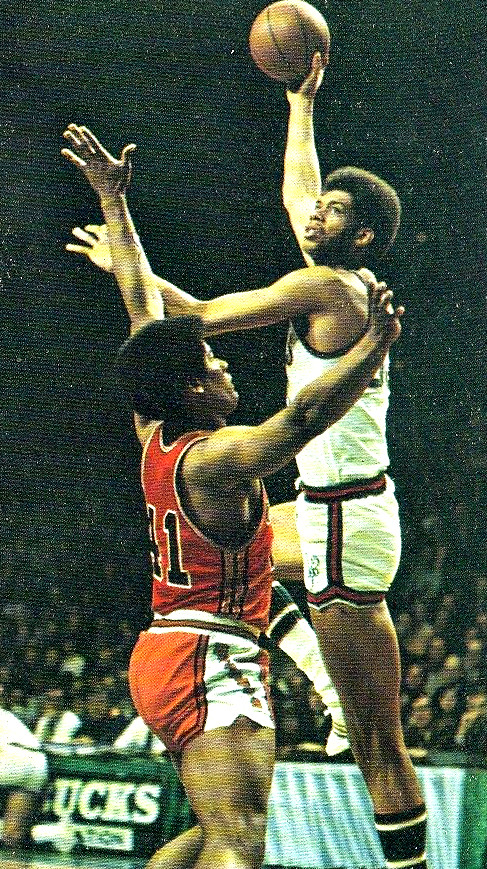
Unseld guarding Kareem Abdul-Jabbar of the Milwaukee Bucks c. 1971

Unseld was selected as the second overall pick by the Baltimore Bullets in the 1968 NBA draft. He was also selected by his hometown Kentucky Colonels of the American Basketball Association (ABA) in the 1968 ABA draft. Unseld was offered contracts by both teams but opted to sign with the Bullets of the more successful NBA despite them allegedly offering less money. After signing Unseld, Bullets owner Earl Foreman proclaimed that "this contract represents the most attractive and rewarding contract that has or will be signed by any player in the NBA this year."

In his first regular season game, Unseld recorded eight points and 22 rebounds in a 124–116 Baltimore win over the Detroit Pistons. On October 19, Unseld recorded his first double-double of his career after recording 13 points and 20 rebounds in a 124–121 loss to the Philadelphia 76ers. On November 22, Unseld recorded 20 points and a career-high 29 rebounds in a 121–110 loss to the 76ers.

As a rookie, Unseld helped lead the Bullets (which had finished in last place in the Eastern division the previous year) to a 57–25 (.695) record and a division title. Unseld averaged 18.2 rebounds per game that year, and joined fellow future Hall of Famer Wilt Chamberlain to become the second player ever to win the Rookie of the Year Award and the Most Valuable Player Award in the same year. Unseld was also named to the NBA All-Rookie First Team, and also claimed the Sporting News MVP that year.

Unseld, who was one of the best rebounders of his era, led the NBA in rebounding in the 1974–75. The following season, he led the NBA in field goal percentage with a .561 percentage.

First with star ball-handler Earl Monroe and renowned two-way player Gus Johnson, and later with dominant center-turned-power-forward Elvin Hayes and experienced wing Bob Dandridge, Unseld played a key role in the Bullets making four NBA Finals appearances from 1971 to 1979, and won the championship in 1978 over the Seattle SuperSonics, in which he was named the Finals MVP. He ended his playing career in March 1981, and his No. 41 jersey was retired by the Bullets shortly thereafter.

== Player profile ==
Famed for his rebounding, bone-jarring picks and ability to ignite a fast break with his crisp, accurate outlet passes, Unseld made up for his lack of height as a center with brute strength and sheer determination. In 984 NBA games – all with the Bullets – Unseld averaged a double-double in points and rebounds, with averages of 10.8 points and 14.0 rebounds per game. He also averaged 3.9 assists, excellent for a center, in the 36 minutes he played per game. Unseld was inducted into the Naismith Memorial Basketball Hall of Fame in 1988, and in 1996, he was named as one of the NBA's 50 Greatest Players of all time. In 2021, he was named on the NBA 75th Anniversary Team. To commemorate the NBA's 75th Anniversary The Athletic ranked their top 75 players of all time, and named Unseld as the 60th greatest player in NBA history.

== Executive and coaching career ==
After his retirement as a player, Unseld wasn't nearly as successful as a head coach and executive. In 1981, he moved into a front office position as Bullets vice president for six years before being named head coach in 1988. He resigned following the 1994 season with a 202–345 record (.369 win percentage) in the regular season. Unseld became the Bullets' general manager in 1996 (they were renamed to the Wizards in 1997) and served in that role for seven years. His team advanced to the playoffs once during his tenure as GM and failed to win a game.

== Personal life ==
Unseld's wife, Connie, opened Unselds School in 1979. A coed private school located in southwest Baltimore, it has a daycare program, nursery school and a kindergarten-to-eighth grade curriculum. Connie and daughter Kimberly served as teachers at the school. Unseld worked as an office manager and head basketball coach.

Unseld was the godfather of Utah Jazz forward Kevin Love, whose father Stan Love was a former teammate. His son, Wes Unseld Jr., served as the head coach of the Wizards from 2021 to 2024.

== Death ==
Unseld died on June 2, 2020, of complications from pneumonia among other physical ailments.

== NBA career statistics ==
=== Playing ===
Legend
GP	Games played	GS	Games started	MPG	Minutes per game
FG%	Field goal percentage	3P%	3-point field goal percentage	FT%	Free throw percentage
RPG	Rebounds per game	APG	Assists per game	SPG	Steals per game
BPG	Blocks per game	PPG	Points per game	**Bold**	Career high
†	Won an NBA championship	*	Led the league

NBA regular season playing statistics
Year	Team	GP	GS	MPG	FG%	3P%	FT%	RPG	APG	SPG	BPG	PPG
1968–69	Baltimore	**82**	—	36.2	.476	—	.605	**18.2**	2.6	—	—	13.8
1969–70	Baltimore	**82***	—	39.4	.518	—	.638	16.7	3.5	—	—	**16.2**
1970–71	Baltimore	74	—	39.2	.501	—	.657	16.9	4.0	—	—	14.1
1971–72	Baltimore	76	—	**41.7**	.498	—	.629	17.6	3.7	—	—	13.0
1972–73	Baltimore	79	—	39.1	.493	—	**.703**	15.9	4.4	—	—	12.5
1973–74	Capital	56	—	30.8	.438	—	.655	9.2	2.8	1.0	.3	5.9
1974–75	Washington	73	—	39.8	.502	—	.685	14.8*	4.1	**1.6**	**.9**	9.2
1975–76	Washington	78	—	37.5	.561*	—	.585	13.3	**5.2**	1.1	.8	9.6
1976–77	Washington	**82**	—	34.9	.490	—	.602	10.7	4.4	1.1	.5	7.8
1977–78†	Washington	80	—	33.1	.523	—	.538	11.9	4.1	1.2	.6	7.6
1978–79	Washington	77	—	31.2	**.577**	—	.643	10.8	4.1	.9	.5	10.9
1979–80	Washington	**82**	—	36.3	.513	**.500**	.665	13.3	4.5	.8	.7	9.7
1980–81	Washington	63	—	32.3	.524	**.500**	.640	10.7	2.7	.8	.6	8.0
Career		984	—	36.4	.509	.500	.633	14.0	3.9	1.1	.6	10.8
All-Star		5	0	15.4	.500	—	.600	7.2	1.2	.4	.0	6.2

NBA playoff playing statistics
Year	Team	GP	GS	MPG	FG%	3P%	FT%	RPG	APG	SPG	BPG	PPG
1969	Baltimore	4	—	41.3	.526	—	**.789**	18.5	1.3	—	—	**18.8**
1970	Baltimore	7	—	41.3	.414	—	**.789**	**23.6**	3.4	—	—	10.4
1971	Baltimore	18	—	42.2	.462	—	.568	18.8	3.8	—	—	13.2
1972	Baltimore	6	—	**44.3**	.492	—	.526	12.5	4.2	—	—	12.3
1973	Baltimore	5	—	40.2	.417	—	.474	15.2	3.4	—	—	9.8
1974	Capital	7	—	42.4	.492	—	.600	12.1	3.9	.6	.1	10.1
1975	Washington	17	—	43.2	.546	—	.656	16.2	3.8	**.9**	1.2	10.7
1976	Washington	7	—	**44.3**	.462	—	.542	12.1	4.0	**.9**	.6	7.0
1977	Washington	9	—	40.9	**.556**	—	.583	11.7	**4.9**	**.9**	.7	7.4
1978†	Washington	18	—	37.6	.530	—	.587	12.0	4.4	**.9**	.4	9.4
1979	Washington	**19**	—	38.7	.494	—	.609	13.3	3.4	**.9**	.7	10.3
1980	Washington	2	—	43.5	.500	.000	.667	14.0	3.5	.0	**1.5**	9.0
Career		119	—	41.1	.493	.000	.608	14.9	3.8	.8	.7	10.6

=== Coaching ===
Legend
Regular season	G	Games coached	W	Games won	L	Games lost	W–L %	Win–loss %
Playoffs	PG	Playoff games	PW	Playoff wins	PL	Playoff losses	PW–L %	Playoff win–loss %

Coaching record
Team	Year	G	W	L	W–L%	Finish	PG	PW	PL	PW–L%	Result
Washington	1987–88	55	30	25	.545	2nd in Atlantic	5	2	3	.400	Lost in first round
Washington	1988–89	82	40	42	.488	4th in Atlantic	—	—	—	—	Missed playoffs
Washington	1989–90	82	31	51	.378	4th in Atlantic	—	—	—	—	Missed playoffs
Washington	1990–91	82	30	52	.366	4th in Atlantic	—	—	—	—	Missed playoffs
Washington	1991–92	82	25	57	.305	6th in Atlantic	—	—	—	—	Missed playoffs
Washington	1992–93	82	22	60	.268	7th in Atlantic	—	—	—	—	Missed playoffs
Washington	1993–94	82	24	58	.293	7th in Atlantic	—	—	—	—	Missed playoffs
Career		547	202	345	.369		5	2	3	.400	

== See also ==
- List of National Basketball Association career rebounding leaders
- List of National Basketball Association career playoff rebounding leaders
- List of National Basketball Association annual rebounding leaders
- List of National Basketball Association single-season rebounding leaders
- List of National Basketball Association players with most rebounds in a game
- List of NCAA Division I men's basketball career rebounding leaders
- List of people from the Louisville metropolitan area
- List of University of Louisville people
- List of NBA single-game steals leaders
