= Mike Riordan (basketball) =

American basketball player (born 1945)

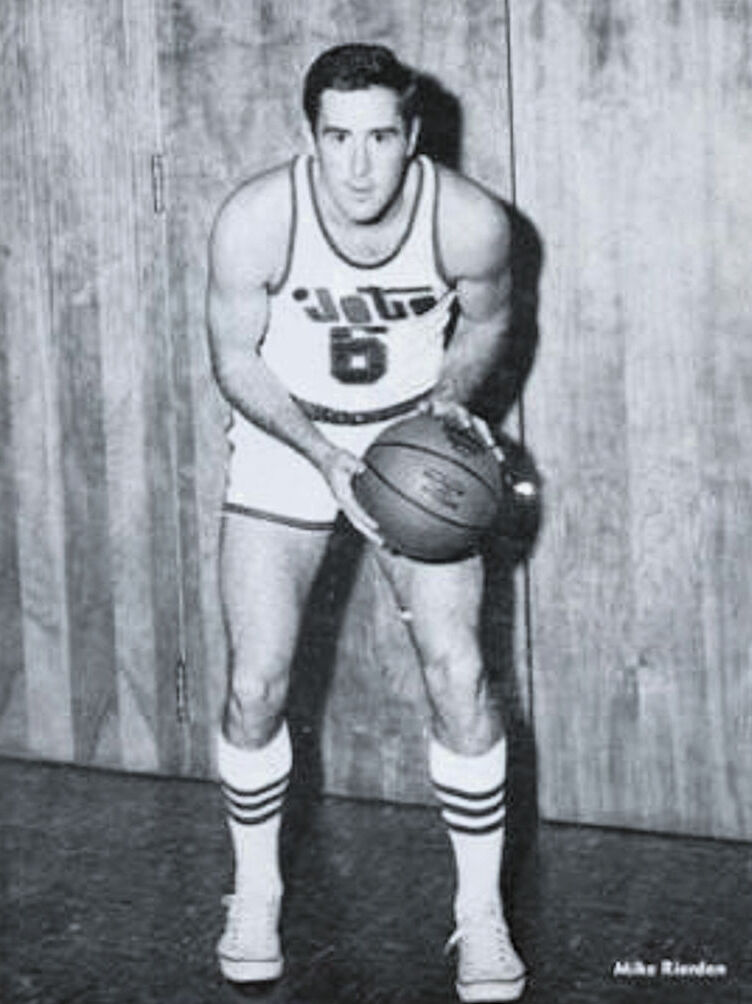
- Riordan with the Allentown Jets in 1967

Personal information
- Born: July 9, 1945 (age 81) New York City, New York, U.S.
- Listed height: 6 ft 4 in (1.93 m)
- Listed weight: 200 lb (91 kg)

Career information
- High school: Holy Cross (Queens, New York)
- College: Providence (1964–1967)
- NBA draft: 1967: 12th round, 128th overall pick
- Drafted by: New York Knicks
- Playing career: 1967–1977
- Position: Shooting guard / small forward
- Number: 6

Career history
- 1967–1968: Allentown Jets
- 1968–1971: New York Knicks
- 1971–1977: Baltimore / Capital / Washington Bullets

Career highlights
- NBA champion (1970); NBA All-Defensive Second Team (1973); EPBL champion (1968)

Career NBA statistics
- Points: 6,334 (9.9 ppg)
- Rebounds: 1,830 (2.9 rpg)
- Assists: 1,524 (2.4 apg)
- Stats at NBA.com
- Stats at Basketball Reference

Michael W. Riordan (born July 9, 1945) is an American former professional basketball player who played nine seasons in the National Basketball Association (NBA). He played college basketball for the Providence Friars.

== College career ==
A 6'4" swingman from Holy Cross High School (Queens, New York), Riordan attended Providence College and played college basketball for the Providence Friars.

Riordan played three seasons for the Friars, averaging 11.2 points and 8.2 rebounds per game over his college career.

== Professional career ==
Riordan played for the Allentown Jets of the Eastern Professional Basketball League (EPBL) during the 1967–68 season and won the EPBL championship in 1968.

Riordan played 9 seasons (1968–1977) in the National Basketball Association as a member of the New York Knicks and Baltimore/Capital/Washington Bullets. He scored 6,334 points in his NBA career and won an NBA Championship with the Knicks in 1970. He was traded along with Dave Stallworth and an undisclosed amount of cash to the Baltimore Bullets for Earl Monroe on November 11, 1971. He was named to the NBA All-Defensive Second Team in 1973.

== Post-playing career ==
Riordan owned Riordan's Saloon, a bar and restaurant located in Annapolis, Maryland.

== Military service ==
Riordan served in the United States Air Force, where he was a mechanic and played basketball at night. While playing for the Knicks, Riordan was in the New York Air National Guard at the 274th Mobile Communications Squadron located at Roslyn Air National Guard Station, New York.

== Career statistics ==
Legend
GP	Games played	GS	Games started	MPG	Minutes per game
FG%	Field goal percentage	3P%	3-point field goal percentage	FT%	Free throw percentage
RPG	Rebounds per game	APG	Assists per game	SPG	Steals per game
BPG	Blocks per game	PPG	Points per game	**Bold**	Career high
†	Won an NBA championship	*	Led the league

=== NBA ===
==== Regular season ====
Year	Team	GP	GS	MPG	FG%	FT%	RPG	APG	SPG	BPG	PPG
1968–69	New York	54	1	7.4	.340	.667	1.1	.9			2.3
1969–70†	New York	81	**5**	20.7	.464	.691	2.4	2.5			7.7
1970–71	New York	**82**	2	16.1	.418	.620	2.1	1.5			4.8
1971–72	New York	4	0	8.3	.364	.000	.3	.5			2.0
1971–72	Baltimore	54		24.9	.469	.683	2.4	2.3			10.0
1972–73	Baltimore	**82***		**42.3**	**.510**	.821	**4.9**	**5.2**			**18.1**
1973–74	Capital	81		39.9	.472	.782	4.7	3.3	**1.3**	**.2**	15.9
1974–75	Washington	74		29.6	.492	**.838**	3.8	2.7	1.0	.1	15.4
1975–76	Washington	78		24.9	.440	.740	2.4	1.6	.7	**.2**	8.4
1976–77	Washington	49		5.9	.362	.733	.6	.4	.1	.0	1.6
Career		639	8	24.9	.470	.744	2.9	2.4	.8	.1	9.9

==== Playoffs ====
Year	Team	GP	GS	MPG	FG%	FT%	RPG	APG	SPG	BPG	PPG
1969	New York	10	0	10.8	.513	.750	1.7	.3			5.2
1970†	New York	**19***	0	15.6	.486	.714	2.4	1.4			6.9
1971	New York	12	0	14.0	.385	.750	2.5	.8			3.8
1972	Baltimore	6		26.8	**.579**	.810	2.5	1.8			13.8
1973	Baltimore	5		**46.2**	.452	.792	**3.6**	**3.0**			**15.0**
1974	Capital	7		38.1	.414	**.875**	3.4	2.4	.6	**.3**	12.3
1975	Washington	17*		22.2	.397	.778	2.4	1.6	**.9**	.1	7.9
1976	Washington	6		5.2	.375	–	1.0	.2	.0	.0	1.0
1977	Washington	2		4.0	.000	–	1.0	.5	.0	.0	.0
Career		84	0	19.6	.446	.775	2.4	1.3	.6	.1	7.3
