= Elvin Hayes =

American basketball player (born 1945)

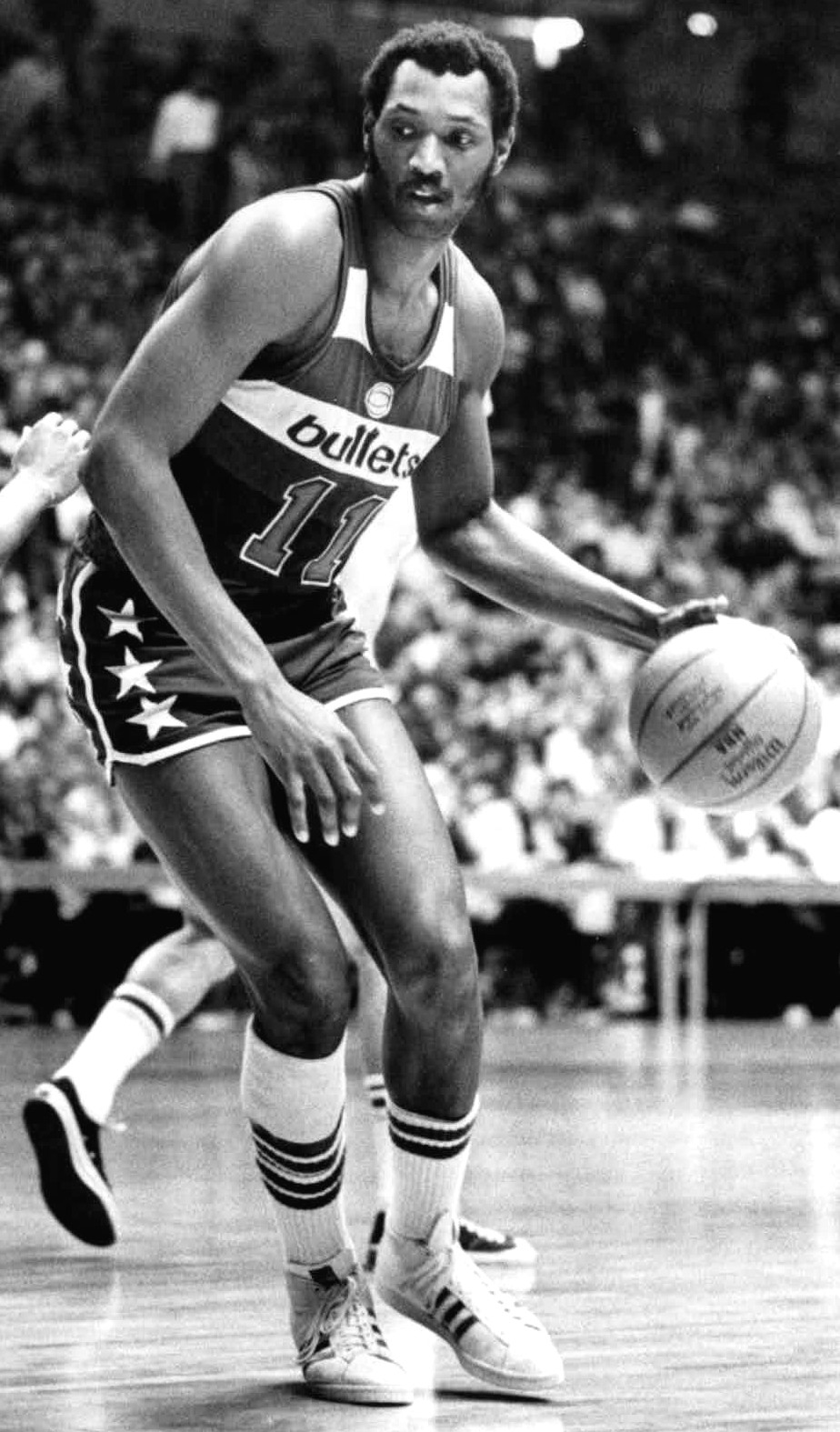
- Hayes with the Washington Bullets in 1975

Personal information
- Born: November 17, 1945 (age 80) Rayville, Louisiana, U.S.
- Listed height: 6 ft 9 in (206 cm)
- Listed weight: 235 lb (107 kg)

Career information
- High school: Eula D. Britton (Rayville, Louisiana)
- College: Houston (1965–1968)
- NBA draft: 1968: 1st round, 1st overall pick
- Drafted by: San Diego Rockets
- Playing career: 1968–1984
- Position: Power forward / center
- Number: 11, 44

Career history

Playing
- 1968–1972: San Diego / Houston Rockets
- 1972–1981: Baltimore / Capital / Washington Bullets
- 1981–1984: Houston Rockets

Career highlights
- NBA champion (1978); 12× NBA All-Star (1969–1980); 3× All-NBA First Team (1975, 1977, 1979); 3× All-NBA Second Team (1973, 1974, 1976); 2× NBA All-Defensive Second Team (1974, 1975); NBA All-Rookie First Team (1969); NBA scoring champion (1969); 2× NBA rebounding leader (1970, 1974); No. 11 retired by Washington Wizards; No. 44 retired by Houston Rockets; NBA anniversary team (50th, 75th); Associated Press Player of the Year (1968); UPI Player of the Year (1968); Sporting News Player of the Year (1968); 2× Consensus first-team All-American (1967, 1968); No. 44 retired by Houston Cougars

Career statistics
- Points: 27,313 (21.0 ppg)
- Rebounds: 16,279 (12.5 rpg)
- Blocks: 1,771 (2.0 bpg)
- Stats at NBA.com
- Stats at Basketball Reference
- Basketball Hall of Fame
- Collegiate Basketball Hall of Fame

Elvin Ernest Hayes (born November 17, 1945), nicknamed "the Big E", is an American former professional basketball player and radio analyst for his alma mater Houston Cougars. He is a member of the NBA's 50th and 75th anniversary teams, and an inductee in the Naismith Memorial Basketball Hall of Fame. Known for both his offensive and defensive prowess, Hayes is often regarded as one of the best power forwards in NBA history.

Hayes, a high school champion in basketball, was recruited to play for the Houston Cougars; Hayes and Don Chaney were the first African American basketball players for the program. Hayes went to the Final Four twice in his college career while averaging over thirty points a game. His 222 rebounds in the NCAA tournament is still the most by a player in history. Drafted by both the NBA and the ABA, Hayes picked the San Diego Rockets in 1968, averaging over 28 points per game that currently ranks as the last time a rookie has led the NBA in scoring average. In his first four seasons, he averaged 25 points per game each time but conflicts with coaching led to his trade to the Baltimore Bullets in 1972. In his nine seasons with the team in Baltimore and Washington, Hayes and his durable presence aided the team to three NBA Finals appearances (1975, 1978, 1979). In the playoff run for 1978, Hayes had the most points for all players in the playoffs and averaged over 21 points and 12 rebounds per game; in the Finals against Seattle, he had more points than every player and had the second most rebounds as the Bullets won Game 7 for their only championship. His 11 offensive rebounds in Game 3 of the 1979 NBA Finals is an NBA Finals record that has been tied but never surpassed. Hayes was traded back to the Rockets in 1981, where he played his final three seasons.

Among the individual accolades achieved by Hayes are 12 NBA All-Star Game selections, three All-NBA First Team and All-NBA Second Team honors each, two NBA All-Defensive Second Team honors, one NBA scoring title, and two NBA rebounding titles. Hayes is also known for his longevity, being seventh in NBA minutes played (at exactly 50,000), and missing only nine games during his 16-season career. He was inducted into the Naismith Memorial Basketball Hall of Fame in 1990 and the National Collegiate Basketball Hall of Fame in 2006.

== Early life ==
In Hayes' senior year at Britton High School, he led his team to the state championship, after averaging 35 points a game during the regular season. In the championship game victory, Hayes scored 45 points and grabbed 20 rebounds.

== College career ==
In 1964, the University of Houston's administration informed Houston's basketball Coach, Guy Lewis, that he could recruit African American players. Lewis, who never heard of Elvin Hayes, learned about him from Isaac Morehead, an African American coach at nearby Texas Southern University. Morehead worried Hayes, who is from Rayville, Louisiana, might choose either Grambling State University or Southern University, both in Texas Southern's conference. Lewis dispatched his assistant coach, Harvey Pate to Rayville who returned with the assessment that Hayes was the best high school player he had ever seen. Subsequently, Lewis recruited Hayes and Don Chaney who was from Baton Rouge, Louisiana as the University of Houston's first African American basketball players.

In 1966, Hayes led the Houston Cougars into the Western Regional semifinals of the 1966 NCAA Men's Division I Basketball Tournament before the Cougars lost to the Pac-8 champion Oregon State Beavers.

In 1967, Hayes led the Cougars to the Final Four of the 1967 NCAA Men's Division I Basketball Tournament. He would attempt 31 field goals, score 25 points, and get 24 rebounds in a 73–58 semifinal loss to the eventual champion UCLA Bruins featuring Lew Alcindor (now Kareem Abdul-Jabbar). Hayes' rebounding total is second to Bill Russell's Final Four record of 27.

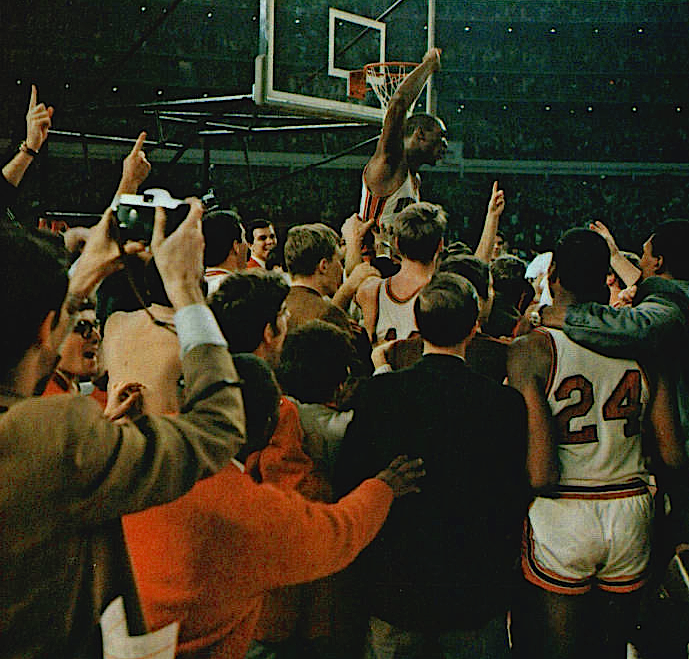
Houston's Hayes is carried in a victory celebration after the defeat of UCLA in the Game of the Century at the Astrodome

On January 20, 1968, Hayes and the Houston Cougars faced Alcindor and the UCLA Bruins in the first-ever nationally televised regular-season college basketball game. In front of a record 52,693 fans at the Houston Astrodome, Hayes scored 39 points and had 15 rebounds while limiting Alcindor to just 15 points as Houston beat UCLA 71–69 to snap the Bruins' 47-game winning streak in what has been called the "Game of the Century". Alcindor had played the game with a serious eye injury, but later attributed the loss to "poor play against a better team". That game helped Hayes earn The Sporting News College Basketball Player of the Year.

In the rematch to the "Game of the Century", Hayes faced Alcindor and UCLA in the 1968 NCAA Men's Division I Basketball Tournament at the Los Angeles Memorial Sports Arena. UCLA coach John Wooden had the Bruins play a "triangle and two" zone defense with Alcindor playing behind Hayes and Lynn Shackleford fronting him. Hayes was held to 10 points, losing to Alcindor and the Bruins 101–69 in the semi-final.

Hayes led Houston in scoring in each of three seasons (1966: 27.2 points per game, 1967: 28.4, and 1968: 36.8). For his college career, Hayes averaged 31.0 points per game and 17.2 rebounds per game. He has the most rebounds in NCAA tournament history at 222. While a student at Houston, Hayes was initiated into Alpha Nu Omega chapter of Iota Phi Theta fraternity alongside fellow future Hall of Famer Calvin Murphy.

With his departure from college, Hayes was the first overall selection in both the 1968 NBA draft and 1968 ABA draft. He was taken by the San Diego Rockets and Houston Mavericks, respectively.

== Professional career ==
=== San Diego / Houston Rockets (1968–1972) ===
Hayes joined the NBA with the San Diego Rockets in 1968 and went on to lead the NBA in scoring with 28.4 points per game, averaged 17.1 rebounds per game, and was named to the NBA All-Rookie Team. Hayes' scoring average is the fifth best all-time for a rookie, and he remains the last rookie to lead the NBA in scoring average. He scored a career-high 54 points against the Detroit Pistons on November 11, 1968.

In Hayes' second season, he led the NBA in rebounding, becoming the first player other than Bill Russell or Wilt Chamberlain to lead the category since 1957 (Chamberlain was injured during much of the season). In Hayes' third season, 1970–71, he scored a career-best 28.7 points per game. The Rockets had some inner turmoil because of perceived jealousy, with forward Don Kojis asking for a trade rather than play for owner Bob Breitbard again. Newcomer coach Alex Hannum once labeled Hayes as "spoiled".

In 1971, the Rockets moved to Houston, enabling Hayes to play in the city of his college triumphs. However, the one season with Tex Winter as coach did not end well, as his attempts at making him a passing center did not result in success.

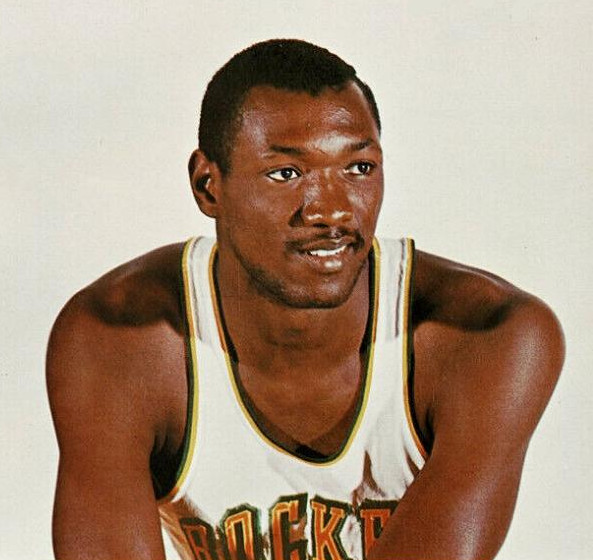
Hayes with San Diego in 1969

=== Baltimore / Capital / Washington Bullets (1972–1981) ===
After a series of conflicts with Houston coach Tex Winter, Hayes was traded to the Baltimore Bullets for Jack Marin and undisclosed considerations on June 23, 1972.

In the 1974 NBA Playoffs, during the franchise's only year called the Capital Bullets, Hayes averaged postseason career-bests of 25.9 points and 15.9 rebounds per game in a Bullets 4–3 first-round series loss to the New York Knicks.

Hayes, with co-star Wes Unseld, led the Washington Bullets to three NBA Finals appearances (1975, 1978, and 1979), including an NBA title over the Seattle SuperSonics in 1978. On March 3, 1978, Hayes set a career high of 11 blocks in a single game, while also scoring 22 points and grabbing 27 rebounds, in a 124–108 win over the Detroit Pistons. During the Bullets' championship run that postseason, while aided by the addition of Bob Dandridge, Hayes averaged 21.8 points and 12.1 rebounds per game in 21 playoff games, as Washington won their only NBA title to date.

Hayes set an NBA Finals record for most offensive rebounds in a game (11), the following year, in a May 27, 1979, game against the SuperSonics. The Chicago Bulls' Dennis Rodman tied this record twice, both in the 1996 NBA Finals, also against the SuperSonics.

=== Return to the Rockets (1981–1984) ===
Desiring to finish his playing career in Texas and preferably Houston, Hayes was sent back to the Rockets for second-round draft picks in 1981 (Charles Davis) and 1983 (Sidney Lowe) on June 8, 1981.

== Coaching career ==
After his playing career ended in 1984, Hayes was hired as the head coach of the Houston Shamrocks of the newly founded Women's American Basketball Association. However, Hayes only lasted two weeks and resigned after coaching the team for one game.

== After basketball ==
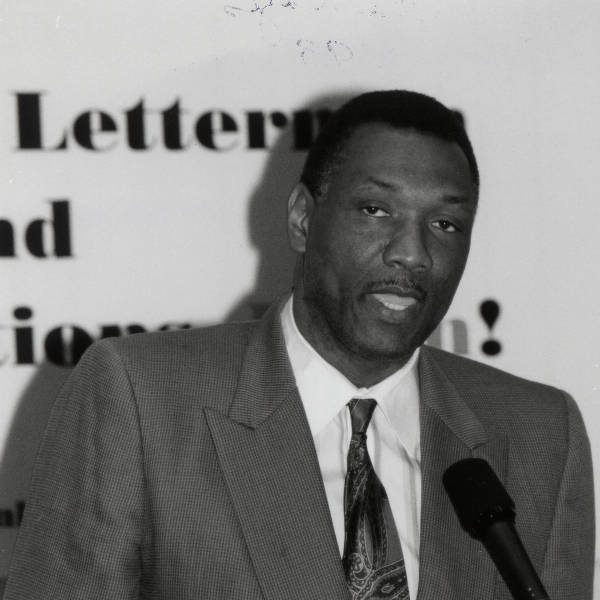
Hayes at the University of Houston

Shortly after finishing his career in the NBA, Hayes returned to the University of Houston to finish the last 30 credit hours of his undergraduate degree. When interviewed about the experience, Hayes mentioned, "I played 16 years of pro basketball, but this is the hardest thing I've ever done."

In November 2007, Hayes became a Liberty County, Texas, sheriff's deputy, fulfilling a childhood dream. On November 22, 2010, it was announced that he would serve as an analyst for radio broadcasts of Houston Cougars games on Houston's KBME.

Hayes had his #44 jersey retired by the Houston Rockets on November 18, 2022.

== Personal life ==
Raised a Methodist, Hayes converted to Catholicism in the 1970s. During a moment of doubt, he went with his wife to a Pentecostal church. Encouraged by words about being answered in the open, he enclosed himself in his room with the Bible for days before claiming to be infused with the holy spirit.

Hayes is the younger brother of Bunny Greenhouse, a whistleblower and former chief contracting officer of the US Army Corps of Engineers.

== Stats and honors ==
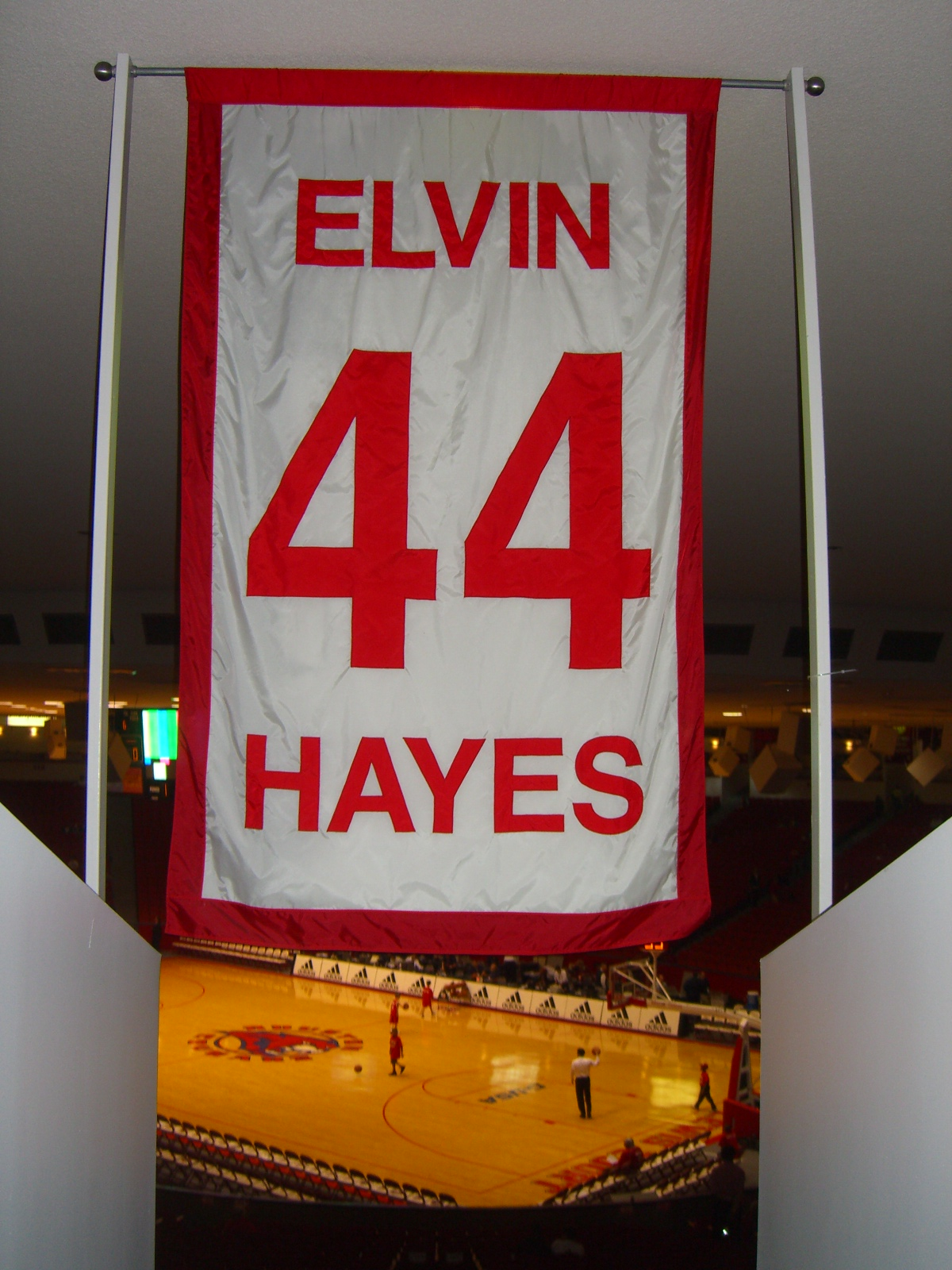
One of five numbers retired by the University of Houston men's basketball team, Hayes's No. 44 hangs in Fertitta Center.

In his career with the San Diego / Houston Rockets and the Baltimore / Capital / Washington Bullets, Hayes played 1,303 games over 16 seasons, registering 27,313 points (twelfth all-time) and 16,279 rebounds (fourth all-time). He is the all-time leading scorer for the Washington Bullets/Wizards. Hayes never missed more than two games in any of his 16 seasons in the NBA. In addition to his 1968 scoring title, he led the NBA in rebounding in 1970 and 1974. Hayes played in 12 straight NBA All-Star Games from 1969 to 1980. He retired holding the NBA record for total regular-season minutes played, with exactly 50,000.

Hayes was elected to the Naismith Memorial Basketball Hall of Fame in 1990. He was named one of the 50 Greatest Players in NBA History in 1996 and voted to the NBA 75th Anniversary Team in 2021. He boycotted the Hall of Fame beginning in 1990 and refused to return until Guy Lewis, his coach at the University of Houston, was admitted.

In 2003, Hayes was inducted into the Breitbard Hall of Fame, which honors San Diego's finest athletes.

== NBA career statistics ==
Legend
GP	Games played	GS	Games started	MPG	Minutes per game
FG%	Field goal percentage	3P%	3-point field goal percentage	FT%	Free throw percentage
RPG	Rebounds per game	APG	Assists per game	SPG	Steals per game
BPG	Blocks per game	PPG	Points per game	**Bold**	Career high
†	Won an NBA championship	*	Led the league

=== Regular season ===
Year	Team	GP	GS	MPG	FG%	3P%	FT%	RPG	APG	SPG	BPG	PPG
1968–69	San Diego	**82**	—	**45.1**	.447	—	.626	17.1	1.4	—	—	28.4*
1969–70	San Diego	**82***	—	44.7*	.452	—	.688	16.9*	2.0	—	—	27.5
1970–71	San Diego	**82**	—	44.3	.428	—	.672	16.6	2.3	—	—	**28.7**
1971–72	Houston	**82**	—	42.2	.434	—	.649	14.6	**3.3**	—	—	25.2
1972–73	Baltimore	81	—	32.1	.444	—	.671	14.1	1.6	—	—	21.2
1973–74	Capital	81	—	44.5*	.423	—	.721	**18.1***	2.0	1.1	**3.0**	21.4
1974–75	Washington	**82**	—	42.3	.443	—	**.766**	12.2	2.5	**1.9**	2.3	23.0
1975–76	Washington	80	—	37.2	.470	—	.628	11.0	1.5	1.3	2.5	19.8
1976–77	Washington	**82**	—	41.0	**.501**	—	.687	12.5	1.9	1.1	2.7	23.7
1977–78†	Washington	81	—	40.1	.451	—	.634	13.3	1.8	1.2	2.0	19.7
1978–79	Washington	**82**	—	37.9	.487	—	.654	12.1	1.7	.9	2.3	21.8
1979–80	Washington	81	—	39.3	.454	.231	.699	11.1	1.6	.8	2.3	23.0
1980–81	Washington	81	—	36.2	.451	.000	.617	9.7	1.2	.8	2.1	17.8
1981–82	Houston	**82**	**82**	37.0	.472	.000	.664	9.1	1.8	.8	1.3	16.1
1982–83	Houston	81	43	28.4	.476	**.500**	.683	7.6	2.0	.6	1.0	12.9
1983–84	Houston	81	4	12.3	.406	.000	.652	3.2	.9	.2	.3	5.0
Career		1,303	129	38.4	.452	.147	.670	12.5	1.8	1.0	2.0	21.0
All-Star		12	4	22.0	.403	—	.647	7.7	1.4	–	–	10.5

=== Playoffs ===
Year	Team	GP	GS	MPG	FG%	3P%	FT%	RPG	APG	SPG	BPG	PPG
1969	San Diego	6	—	**46.3**	.526	—	.660	13.8	.8	—	—	25.8
1973	Baltimore	5	—	45.6	.505	—	.697	11.4	1.0	—	—	25.8
1974	Capital	7	—	46.1	.531	—	.707	**15.9**	3.0	0.7	2.1	**25.9**
1975	Washington	17	—	44.2	.468	—	.677	10.9	2.2	**1.5**	2.3	25.5
1976	Washington	7	—	43.6	.443	—	.582	12.6	1.4	.7	**4.0**	20.0
1977	Washington	9	—	45.0	**.563**	—	.695	13.6	1.9	1.1	2.4	21.0
1978†	Washington	**21**	—	41.3	.491	—	.594	13.3	2.0	1.5	2.5	21.8
1979	Washington	19	—	41.4	.429	—	.669	14.0	**5.0**	.9	2.7	22.5
1980	Washington	2	—	46.0	.390	—	**.800**	11.0	3.0	.0	2.0	20.0
1982	Houston	3	—	41.3	.340	—	.533	10.0	1.0	.7	3.3	14.0
Career		96	—	43.3	.464	—	.652	13.0	1.9	1.1	2.6	22.9

== See also ==
=== NBA ===
- List of NBA career games played leaders
- List of NBA franchise career scoring leaders
- List of NBA career scoring leaders
- List of NBA career rebounding leaders
- List of NBA career blocks leaders
- List of NBA career personal fouls leaders
- List of NBA career free throw scoring leaders
- List of NBA career minutes played leaders
- List of NBA career playoff blocks leaders
- List of NBA single-game blocks leaders
- List of NBA annual scoring leaders
- List of NBA annual rebounding leaders
- List of NBA annual minutes played leaders
- List of NBA single-season rebounding leaders
- List of NBA rookie single-season scoring leaders

=== College ===
- List of NCAA Division I men's basketball players with 60 or more points in a game
- List of NCAA Division I men's basketball players with 2000 points and 1000 rebounds
- List of NCAA Division I men's basketball career rebounding leaders
