= Phil Hicks =

American basketball player (born 1953)

Personal information
- Born: January 31, 1953 (age 73) Chicago, Illinois
- Listed height: 6 ft 7 in (2.01 m)
- Listed weight: 205 lb (93 kg)

Career information
- High school: Brother Rice (Chicago, Illinois)
- College: Tulane (1973–1976)
- NBA draft: 1976: 2nd round, 27th overall pick
- Drafted by: Houston Rockets
- Playing career: 1976–1988
- Position: Small forward
- Number: 33, 55

Career history
- 1976: Houston Rockets
- 1976–1977: Chicago Bulls
- 1978–1979: Denver Nuggets
- 1979–1982: Virtus Banco di Roma
- 1983–1984: Reims
- 1986–1987: Liberti Firenze
- 1987–1988: Reims
- Stats at NBA.com
- Stats at Basketball Reference

Phillip James Hicks (born January 31, 1953) is an American former basketball player from Chicago, Illinois who played for three years at Tulane University, before being drafted by the Houston Rockets in the 1976 NBA draft. He played for the Rockets for only two games, before being traded to the Chicago Bulls. He was traded again at the end of the 1976–77 season to the Denver Nuggets, for whom he played for 20 games.

== Career statistics ==
Legend
| GP | Games played | GS | Games started | MPG | Minutes per game |
| FG% | Field goal percentage | 3P% | 3-point field goal percentage | FT% | Free throw percentage |
| RPG | Rebounds per game | APG | Assists per game | SPG | Steals per game |
| BPG | Blocks per game | PPG | Points per game | **Bold** | Career high |

=== NBA ===
==== Regular season ====
| Year | Team | GP | MPG | FG% | FT% | RPG | APG | SPG | BPG | PPG |
|---|---|---|---|---|---|---|---|---|---|---|
| 1976–77 | Houston | 2 | 3.5 | .000 | – | .5 | .5 | **.5** | .0 | .0 |
| 1976–77 | Chicago | **35** | **7.3** | **.471** | **.846** | **1.9** | **.7** | .2 | .0 | **2.7** |
| 1978–79 | Denver | 20 | 6.4 | .419 | .600 | 1.4 | .4 | .3 | .0 | 2.0 |
| Career | | 57 | 6.8 | .447 | .778 | 1.6 | .6 | .2 | .0 | 2.3 |

==== Playoffs ====
| Year | Team | GP | MPG | FG% | FT% | RPG | APG | SPG | BPG | PPG |
|---|---|---|---|---|---|---|---|---|---|---|
| 1977 | Chicago | 1 | 4.0 | .000 | – | 3.0 | .0 | .0 | .0 | .0 |
