= Tom Kropp =

American basketball player

Personal information
- Born: February 12, 1953 (age 73) Grand Island, Nebraska, U.S.
- Listed height: 6 ft 3 in (1.91 m)
- Listed weight: 205 lb (93 kg)

Career information
- High school: Aurora (Aurora, Nebraska)
- College: Nebraska–Kearney (1971–1975)
- NBA draft: 1975: 3rd round, 48th overall pick
- Drafted by: Washington Bullets
- Playing career: 1975–1977
- Position: Point guard
- Number: 24, 44

Career history

Playing
- 1975–1976: Washington Bullets
- 1976–1977: Chicago Bulls

Coaching
- 1997–2015: Nebraska–Kearney
- Stats at NBA.com
- Stats at Basketball Reference

Thomas Carl Kropp (born February 12, 1953) is an American former professional basketball player born in Grand Island, Nebraska.

A 6-foot-3-inch (1.91 m) guard from the Kearney State College, Kropp played two seasons (1975–1977) in the National Basketball Association as a member of the Washington Bullets and Chicago Bulls. He averaged 2.5 points per game.

Kropp recorded a career high on October 30, 1976 against the Milwaukee Bucks, scoring 18 points and going 7/12 from the field.

== Career statistics ==
Legend
GP	Games played	GS	Games started	MPG	Minutes per game
FG%	Field goal percentage	3P%	3-point field goal percentage	FT%	Free throw percentage
RPG	Rebounds per game	APG	Assists per game	SPG	Steals per game
BPG	Blocks per game	PPG	Points per game	**Bold**	Career high

=== NBA ===
==== Regular season ====
Year	Team	GP	GS	MPG	FG%	FT%	RPG	APG	SPG	BPG	PPG
1975–76	Washington	25		2.9	.233	**.833**	.6	.3	.1	.0	.8
1976–77	Chicago	**53**	7	**9.1**	**.480**	.683	**.9**	**.7**	**.3**	.0	**3.3**
Career		78	7	7.1	.440	.702	.8	.6	.3	.0	2.5

==== Playoffs ====
Year	Team	GP	MPG	FG%	FT%	RPG	APG	SPG	BPG	PPG
1976	Washington	**1**	**2.0**	**1.000**	–	.0	.0	.0	.0	**2.0**
1977	Chicago	**1**	**2.0**	–	–	.0	.0	.0	.0	.0
Career		2	2.0	1.000	–	.0	.0	.0	.0	1.0
