= Jim Price (basketball) =

American basketball player (born 1949)

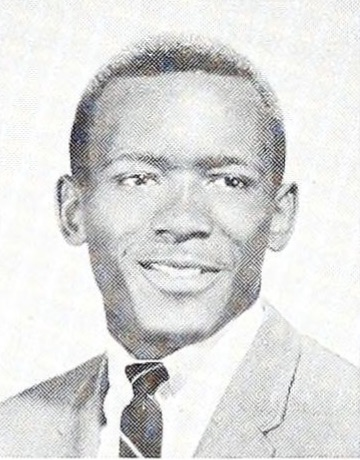
- Price in 1968

Personal information
- Born: November 27, 1949 (age 76) Russellville, Kentucky, U.S.
- Listed height: 6 ft 3 in (1.91 m)
- Listed weight: 195 lb (88 kg)

Career information
- High school: Arsenal Technical (Indianapolis, Indiana)
- College: Louisville (1969–1972)
- NBA draft: 1972: 2nd round, 16th overall pick
- Drafted by: Los Angeles Lakers
- Playing career: 1972–1979
- Position: Point guard
- Number: 15, 25, 11, 5

Career history

Playing
- 1972–1974: Los Angeles Lakers
- 1974–1976: Milwaukee Bucks
- 1976: Buffalo Braves
- 1976–1978: Denver Nuggets
- 1978: Detroit Pistons
- 1978–1979: Los Angeles Lakers

Coaching
- 1982–1987: IUPUI
- 2006: Tampa Bay Strong Dogs

Career highlights
- NBA All-Star (1975); NBA All-Defensive Second Team (1974); NBA All-Rookie First Team (1973); Consensus second-team All-American (1972); 2× First-team All-MVC (1971, 1972)

Career NBA statistics
- Points: 5,088 (10.0 ppg)
- Rebounds: 1,566 (3.1 rpg)
- Assists: 1,886 (3.7 apg)
- Stats at NBA.com
- Stats at Basketball Reference

James E. Price (born November 27, 1949) is an American former professional basketball player and coach.

== Career ==
He played college basketball for the Louisville Cardinals and was selected by the Los Angeles Lakers in the second round of the 1972 NBA draft. Price played seven seasons in the National Basketball Association (NBA) from 1972 to 1979, spending time with the Lakers, Milwaukee Bucks, Buffalo Braves, Denver Nuggets and Detroit Pistons. He was named an All-Star in 1975, after he was traded midseason from the Lakers to the Bucks for Lucius Allen.

Playing with his older brother Mike Price, Jim Price helped lead his Arsenal Technical High School basketball team to the State Finals in 1966; the Titans finished the season with a 25–4 record. He was inducted into the Indiana Basketball Hall of Fame in 2008.

Price entered the coaching ranks following his playing career; he spent 5 years as the head coach of the IUPUI Jaguars women's team, totaling a record of 73–55 and 3 NAIA post-season berths.

== NBA career statistics ==
Legend
| GP | Games played | GS | Games started | MPG | Minutes per game |
| FG% | Field goal percentage | 3P% | 3-point field goal percentage | FT% | Free throw percentage |
| RPG | Rebounds per game | APG | Assists per game | SPG | Steals per game |
| BPG | Blocks per game | PPG | Points per game | **Bold** | Career high |

=== Regular season ===
| Year | Team | GP | MPG | FG% | FT% | RPG | APG | STL | BLK | PPG |
|---|---|---|---|---|---|---|---|---|---|---|
| 1972–73 | L.A. Lakers | 59 | 14.0 | .440 | .822 | 1.9 | 1.6 | – | – | 6.4 |
| 1973–74 | L.A. Lakers | 82 | 32.0 | .449 | .799 | 4.6 | 4.5 | 1.9 | .4 | 15.4 |
| 1974–75 | L.A. Lakers | 9 | **37.7** | .449 | **.911** | **4.8** | **7.0** | **2.3** | .3 | **21.2** |
| 1974–75 | Milwaukee | 41 | 37.3 | .440 | .859 | 3.8 | 5.4 | 2.2 | **.5** | 14.9 |
| 1975–76 | Milwaukee | 80 | 31.6 | .415 | .849 | 3.3 | 4.9 | 1.9 | .4 | 11.7 |
| 1976–77 | Milwaukee | 6 | 18.5 | **.512** | .778 | 2.2 | 2.5 | 1.2 | .2 | 8.2 |
| 1976–77 | Buffalo | 20 | 16.7 | .423 | .850 | 1.7 | 1.9 | 1.3 | .3 | 5.3 |
| 1976–77 | Denver | 55 | 25.2 | .445 | .797 | 3.3 | 3.8 | 1.7 | .3 | 7.9 |
| 1977–78 | Denver | **49** | 22.2 | .481 | .773 | 3.2 | 3.2 | 1.4 | .1 | 6.8 |
| 1977–78 | Detroit | **34** | 24.7 | .421 | .816 | 3.0 | 3.0 | 1.3 | .1 | 11.5 |
| 1978–79 | L.A. Lakers | 75 | 16.1 | .497 | .696 | 1.6 | 2.9 | .9 | .2 | 5.3 |
| Career | | 510 | 25.1 | .444 | .815 | 3.1 | 3.7 | 1.6 | .3 | 10.0 |
| All-Star | | 1 | 17.0 | .333 | 1.000 | 2.0 | .0 | 2.0 | – | 8.0 |

=== Playoffs ===
| Year | Team | GP | MPG | FG% | FT% | RPG | APG | STL | BLK | PPG |
|---|---|---|---|---|---|---|---|---|---|---|
| 1973 | L.A. Lakers | 3 | 5.3 | .273 | – | 1.3 | .7 | – | – | 2.0 |
| 1974 | L.A. Lakers | 5 | **32.2** | **.379** | **.692** | 3.8 | 2.6 | 1.4 | .0 | **11.8** |
| 1976 | Milwaukee | 1 | 19.0 | .375 | .571 | .0 | 4.0 | 1.0 | .0 | 10.0 |
| 1977 | Denver | 6 | 26.3 | .358 | .625 | **4.0** | **4.2** | **2.0** | **.2** | 7.2 |
| 1979 | L.A. Lakers | **8** | 16.0 | .300 | .500 | 1.0 | 2.3 | .6 | .0 | 2.5 |
| Career | | 23 | 21.0 | .351 | .625 | 2.4 | 2.7 | 1.3 | .1 | 6.0 |
