= Norton Barnhill =

American basketball player (1953–2025)

Personal information
- Born: July 15, 1953 Winston-Salem, North Carolina, U.S.
- Died: December 22, 2025 (aged 72)
- Listed height: 6 ft 4 in (1.93 m)
- Listed weight: 205 lb (93 kg)

Career information
- High school: West Forsyth (Clemmons, North Carolina)
- College: Washington State (1973–1976)
- NBA draft: 1976: 8th round, 134th overall pick
- Drafted by: Seattle SuperSonics
- Position: Shooting guard
- Number: 10

Career history
- 1976: Seattle SuperSonics
- 1977–1978: Anchorage Northern Knights
- Stats at NBA.com
- Stats at Basketball Reference

Norton Barnhill (July 15, 1953 – December 22, 2025) was an American basketball player. He was a shooting guard, he played collegiately for the Washington State Cougars. Barnhill played for the Seattle SuperSonics in the NBA for four games during the 1976–77 season. He later played professionally for the Anchorage Northern Knights.

Barnhill died on December 22, 2025, at the age of 72.

== Career statistics ==
Legend
GP	Games played	GS	Games started	MPG	Minutes per game
FG%	Field goal percentage	3P%	3-point field goal percentage	FT%	Free throw percentage
RPG	Rebounds per game	APG	Assists per game	SPG	Steals per game
BPG	Blocks per game	PPG	Points per game	**Bold**	Career high

=== NBA ===
==== Regular season ====
Year	Team	GP	MPG	FG%	FT%	RPG	APG	SPG	BPG	PPG
1976–77	Seattle	4	2.5	.333	–	.8	.3	.0	.0	1.0
