= Butch Feher =

American basketball player

Personal information
- Born: May 19, 1954 (age 72) Flint, Michigan, U.S.
- Listed height: 6 ft 4 in (1.93 m)
- Listed weight: 185 lb (84 kg)

Career information
- High school: Alpena (Alpena, Michigan)
- College: Vanderbilt (1972–1976)
- NBA draft: 1976: 2nd round, 33rd overall pick
- Drafted by: Phoenix Suns
- Position: Shooting guard
- Number: 7

Career history
- 1976–1977: Phoenix Suns
- Stats at NBA.com
- Stats at Basketball Reference

Raymond G. "Butch" Feher (born May 19, 1954, in Flint, Michigan) is an American former professional basketball shooting guard as a member of the Phoenix Suns (1976–77). He attended Vanderbilt University, where as a member of the school's basketball team he scored 30 points three separate times. He was drafted by the Suns during the second round of the 1976 NBA draft.

== Career statistics ==
Legend
GP	Games played	GS	Games started	MPG	Minutes per game
FG%	Field goal percentage	3P%	3-point field goal percentage	FT%	Free throw percentage
RPG	Rebounds per game	APG	Assists per game	SPG	Steals per game
BPG	Blocks per game	PPG	Points per game	**Bold**	Career high

=== NBA ===
==== Regular season ====
Year	Team	GP	MPG	FG%	FT%	RPG	APG	SPG	BPG	PPG
1976–77	Phoenix	48	10.1	.531	.768	1.5	.8	.2	.1	5.2
