= Jerome Anderson (basketball) =

American basketball player and coach (1953–2009)

Personal information
- Born: October 9, 1953 Mullens, West Virginia, U.S.
- Died: August 1, 2009 (aged 55) Helsingborg, Sweden
- Listed height: 6 ft 5 in (1.96 m)
- Listed weight: 195 lb (88 kg)

Career information
- High school: Mullens (Mullens, West Virginia)
- College: West Virginia (1972–1975)
- NBA draft: 1975: 3rd round, 53rd overall pick
- Drafted by: Boston Celtics
- Playing career: 1975–1978
- Position: Shooting guard
- Number: 42, 23, 21

Career history
- 1975–1976: Boston Celtics
- 1976–1977: Indiana Pacers
- 1977–1978: West Virginia Wheels

Career highlights
- NBA champion (1976)
- Stats at NBA.com
- Stats at Basketball Reference

Jerome Anderson (October 9, 1953 – August 1, 2009) was an American professional basketball player and coach. He was born in Mullens, West Virginia.

A 6-foot-5-inch (1.96 m) guard from West Virginia University, Anderson was selected in the third round of the 1975 NBA draft by the Boston Celtics and in the seventh round of the 1975 ABA draft by the San Diego Sails.

Anderson played two seasons (1975–1977) in the National Basketball Association as a member of the Boston Celtics and Indiana Pacers. He averaged 2.6 points per game in his career and won an NBA championship with Boston in 1976.

Anderson later played and coached in Sweden and Norway. Among his achievements as a coach is a BLNO Championship with the Ulriken Eagles in 2007.

Anderson died in Helsingborg aged 55 after a long illness.

== Career statistics ==
Legend
GP	Games played	GS	Games started	MPG	Minutes per game
FG%	Field goal percentage	3P%	3-point field goal percentage	FT%	Free throw percentage
RPG	Rebounds per game	APG	Assists per game	SPG	Steals per game
BPG	Blocks per game	PPG	Points per game	**Bold**	Career high
†	Won an NBA championship

=== NBA ===
==== Regular season ====
Year	Team	GP	MPG	FG%	FT%	RPG	APG	SPG	BPG	PPG
1975–76†	Boston	22	5.7	**.556**	.688	**.6**	.3	.1	**.1**	**2.8**
1976–77	Indiana	**27**	**6.1**	.441	**.700**	.4	**.4**	**.2**	**.1**	2.4
Career		49	5.9	.490	.694	.5	.3	.2	.1	2.6

==== Playoffs ====
Year	Team	GP	MPG	FG%	FT%	RPG	APG	SPG	BPG	PPG
1976†	Boston	4	1.3	.333	–	.3	.3	.0	.0	.5
