= Earl Tatum =

American basketball player

Personal information
- Born: July 26, 1953 (age 73) Mount Vernon, New York, U.S.
- Listed height: 6 ft 5 in (1.96 m)
- Listed weight: 185 lb (84 kg)

Career information
- High school: Mount Vernon (Mount Vernon, New York)
- College: Marquette (1972–1976)
- NBA draft: 1976: 2nd round, 21st overall pick
- Drafted by: Los Angeles Lakers
- Playing career: 1976–1980
- Position: Shooting guard / small forward
- Number: 43, 35

Career history
- 1976–1977: Los Angeles Lakers
- 1977–1978: Indiana Pacers
- 1978: Boston Celtics
- 1978–1979: Detroit Pistons
- 1979–1980: Cleveland Cavaliers

Career highlights
- Consensus second-team All-American (1976); No. 43 retired by Marquette Golden Eagles

Career NBA statistics
- Points: 2,508 (9.6 ppg)
- Rebounds: 682 (2.6 rpg)
- Assists: 507 (1.9 apg)
- Stats at NBA.com
- Stats at Basketball Reference

William Earl Tatum (born July 26, 1953) is an American former professional basketball player from Mount Vernon, New York. He was a 6 ft 4 1/2 in (194 cm) 185 pounds (84 kg) guard who played high school basketball at Mount Vernon, where he was selected large-school player of the year by the New York State Sportswriters Association in 1972, and collegiately at Marquette University.

Tatum was selected with the 4th pick of the second round in the 1976 NBA draft by the Los Angeles Lakers. During the 1977 NBA playoffs, Tatum's only postseason appearance, he averaged 13.6 points and 4.8 rebounds in 11 games, as the Lakers advanced past the Golden State Warriors before losing to the Portland Trail Blazers. He played for five teams in 4 years, his final season spent with the Cleveland Cavaliers in 1979–80.

== Career statistics ==
Legend
GP	Games played	GS	Games started	MPG	Minutes per game
FG%	Field goal percentage	3P%	3-point field goal percentage	FT%	Free throw percentage
RPG	Rebounds per game	APG	Assists per game	SPG	Steals per game
BPG	Blocks per game	PPG	Points per game	**Bold**	Career high

=== NBA ===
==== Regular season ====
Year	Team	GP	GS	MPG	FG%	3P%	FT%	RPG	APG	SPG	BPG	PPG
1976–77	L.A. Lakers	68		18.4	.466		.720	3.5	1.7	1.3	.3	9.4
1977–78	L.A. Lakers	25		26.5	**.487**		.763	**3.6**	2.8	1.5	.4	14.0
1977–78	Indiana	57	40	**32.6**	.462		.788	**3.6**	**4.0**	**1.8**	**.5**	**14.4**
1978–79	Boston	3		12.7	.400		**.800**	1.3	.3	.0	.3	6.7
1978–79	Detroit	**76**		15.7	.448		.727	1.6	.9	1.0	.4	7.8
1979–80	Cleveland	33		6.8	.383	.333	.579	.8	.6	.5	.2	2.6
Career		262	40	20.0	.459	.333	.746	2.6	1.9	1.2	.4	9.6

==== Playoffs ====
Year	Team	GP	MPG	FG%	FT%	RPG	APG	SPG	BPG	PPG
1977	L.A. Lakers	11	32.4	.500	.667	4.9	2.5	1.4	.8	13.6

== See also ==
- List of National Basketball Association players with most steals in a game
