= 1976–77 Chicago Bulls season =

NBA professional basketball team season

- Head coach: Ed Badger
- General manager: Jon Kovler
- Owner(s): Arthur Wirtz and Jonathan Kovler
- Arena: Chicago Stadium

Results
- Record: 44–38 (.537)
- Place: Division: 3rd (Midwest); Conference: 6th (Western)
- Playoff finish: First round (lost to Trail Blazers 1–2)
- Stats at Basketball Reference

Local media
- Television: WGN-TV (Lorn Brown, Johnny “Red” Kerr)
- Radio: WIND (Jim Durham, Bill Berg)

The 1976–77 Chicago Bulls season was the Bulls' 11th season in the NBA.

== Roster ==
1976–77 Chicago Bulls roster
Players

Pos.	No.	Player	Height	Weight	DOB	From
C	18	Tom Boerwinkle	7 ft 0 in (2.13 m)	265 lb (120 kg)	1945-08-23	Tennessee
F/C	41	Eric Fernsten	6 ft 10 in (2.08 m)	205 lb (93 kg)	1953-11-01	San Francisco
C	53	Artis Gilmore	7 ft 2 in (2.18 m)	240 lb (109 kg)	1949-09-21	Jacksonville
F	33	Phil Hicks	6 ft 7 in (2.01 m)	205 lb (93 kg)	1953-01-31	Tulane
G	12	Wilbur Holland	6 ft 0 in (1.83 m)	175 lb (79 kg)	1951-11-08	New Orleans
F	8	Mickey Johnson	6 ft 10 in (2.08 m)	190 lb (86 kg)	1952-08-31	Aurora
G	44	Tom Kropp	6 ft 3 in (1.91 m)	205 lb (93 kg)	1953-02-12	Nebraska–Kearney
G	31	John Laskowski	6 ft 6 in (1.98 m)	185 lb (84 kg)	1953-06-07	Indiana
F	24	Jack Marin	6 ft 6 in (1.98 m)	210 lb (95 kg)	1944-10-12	Duke
F	42	Scott May	6 ft 7 in (2.01 m)	215 lb (98 kg)	1954-03-19	Indiana
G	15	John Mengelt	6 ft 2 in (1.88 m)	195 lb (88 kg)	1949-10-16	Auburn
G	30	Keith Starr	6 ft 6 in (1.98 m)	190 lb (86 kg)	1954-03-14	Pittsburgh
G	2	Norm Van Lier	6 ft 1 in (1.85 m)	173 lb (78 kg)	1947-04-01	Saint Francis (PA)

Coaches
Head coach
- Ed Badger
Assistant(s)
- Bumper Tormohlen

Legend
- (DP) Unsigned draft pick
- (FA) Free agent
- (S) Suspended
- Injured

Roster
Updated: February 2, 1977

== Regular season ==
=== Season standings ===
Midwest Division	W	L	PCT	GB	Home	Road	Div
y-Denver Nuggets	50	32	.610	–	36–5	14–27	15–5
x-Detroit Pistons	44	38	.537	6	30–11	14–27	12–8
x-Chicago Bulls	44	38	.537	6	31–10	13–28	10–10
Kansas City Kings	40	42	.488	10	28–13	12–29	7–13
Indiana Pacers	36	46	.439	14	25–16	11–30	9–11
Milwaukee Bucks	30	52	.366	20	24–17	6–35	7–13

#	Western Conference				
#	Team	W	L	PCT	GB
1	z-Los Angeles Lakers	53	29	.646	–
2	y-Denver Nuggets	50	32	.610	3
3	x-Portland Trail Blazers	49	33	.598	4
4	x-Golden State Warriors	46	36	.561	7
5	x-Detroit Pistons	44	38	.537	9
6	x-Chicago Bulls	44	38	.537	9
7	Kansas City Kings	40	42	.488	13
8	Seattle SuperSonics	40	42	.488	13
9	Indiana Pacers	36	46	.439	17
10	Phoenix Suns	34	48	.415	19
11	Milwaukee Bucks	30	52	.366	23

z – clinched division title
y – clinched division title
x – clinched playoff spot

== Playoffs ==
1977 playoff game log
First Round: 1–2 (home: 1–0; road: 0–2)

Game	Date	Team	Score	High points	High rebounds	High assists	Location Attendance	Series
1	April 12	@ Portland	L 83–96	Mickey Johnson (19)	Artis Gilmore (14)	Norm Van Lier (8)	Memorial Coliseum; 12,774	0–1
2	April 15	Portland	W 107–104	Mickey Johnson (29)	Mickey Johnson (15)	Norm Van Lier (11)	Chicago Stadium; 20,000	1–1
3	April 17	@ Portland	L 98–106	Mickey Johnson (14)	Johnson, Gilmore (14)	Norm Van Lier (10)	Memorial Coliseum; 12,520	1–2

1977 schedule

== Awards and records ==
- Norm Van Lier, NBA All-Defensive First Team
- Scott May, NBA All-Rookie Team 1st Team
- Norm Van Lier, NBA All-Star Game
