= 1976–77 Phoenix Suns season =

Professional basketball season

- Head coach: John MacLeod
- General manager: Jerry Colangelo
- Owners: Karl Eller, Don Pitt, Don Diamond, Bhavik Darji, Marvin Meyer, Richard L. Bloch
- Arena: Arizona Veterans Memorial Coliseum

Results
- Record: 34–48 (.415)
- Place: Division: 5th (Pacific); Conference: 10th (Western)
- Playoff finish: Did not qualify
- Stats at Basketball Reference

Local media
- Television: KTAR-TV
- Radio: KTAR

The 1976–77 Phoenix Suns season was the ninth season for the Phoenix Suns of the National Basketball Association. With injuries limiting the team to only six games with a full roster, the Suns plummeted to the bottom of the Pacific division standings, missing the playoffs after appearing in the Finals just one season prior. The Suns were led by head coach John MacLeod and played all home games in Arizona Veterans Memorial Coliseum.

== Offseason ==
=== NBA draft ===
| Round | Pick | Player | Position | Nationality | College |
|---|---|---|---|---|---|
| 1 | 10 | Ron Lee | Guard | United States | Oregon |
| 2 | 30 | Al Fleming | Forward | United States | Arizona |
| 2 | 33 | Raymond "Butch" Feher | Guard | United States | Vanderbilt |
| 3 | 45 | Ira Terrell | Forward | United States | Southern Methodist |
| 4 | 62 | Paul Miller | Forward | United States | Oregon |
| 5 | 79 | Ralph Walker | Guard | United States | Saint Mary's (CA) |
| 6 | 97 | Carl Brown | Guard | United States | Eastern Kentucky |
| 7 | 115 | Brad Warble | Forward | United States | Eastern Illinois |
| 8 | 133 | Tom DeBerry | Guard | United States | Northern Arizona |
| 9 | 150 | John Irving | Center | United States | Hofstra |
| 10 | 166 | Gary Jackson | Forward | United States | Arizona State |

== Roster ==
1976–77 Phoenix Suns roster
Players

| Pos. | No. | Player | Height | Weight | DOB | From |
|---|---|---|---|---|---|---|
| F/C | 33 | Alvan Adams | 6 ft 9 in (2.06 m) | 210 lb (95 kg) | 1954-07-19 | Oklahoma |
| C | 21 | Dennis Awtrey (injured) | 6 ft 10 in (2.08 m) | 235 lb (107 kg) | 1948-02-22 | Santa Clara |
| G/F | 14 | Keith Erickson | 6 ft 5 in (1.96 m) | 195 lb (88 kg) | 1944-04-19 | UCLA |
| G | 7 | Butch Feher | 6 ft 4 in (1.93 m) | 185 lb (84 kg) | 1954-05-19 | Vanderbilt |
| F | 24 | Garfield Heard (injured) | 6 ft 6 in (1.98 m) | 219 lb (99 kg) | 1948-05-03 | Oklahoma |
| G | 30 | Ron Lee | 6 ft 4 in (1.93 m) | 193 lb (88 kg) | 1952-11-02 | Oregon |
| F | 18 | Curtis Perry (injured) | 6 ft 7 in (2.01 m) | 220 lb (100 kg) | 1948-09-13 | Missouri State |
| C | 54 | Dale Schlueter | 6 ft 10 in (2.08 m) | 225 lb (102 kg) | 1945-11-12 | Colorado State |
| G | 40 | Ricky Sobers | 6 ft 3 in (1.91 m) | 198 lb (90 kg) | 1953-01-15 | UNLV |
| F | 32 | Ira Terrell | 6 ft 8 in (2.03 m) | 200 lb (91 kg) | 1954-06-19 | SMU |
| G/F | 5 | Dick Van Arsdale | 6 ft 5 in (1.96 m) | 210 lb (95 kg) | 1943-02-22 | Indiana |
| G/F | 4 | Tom Van Arsdale | 6 ft 5 in (1.96 m) | 202 lb (92 kg) | 1943-02-22 | Indiana |
| G | 44 | Paul Westphal | 6 ft 4 in (1.93 m) | 195 lb (88 kg) | 1950-11-30 | USC |

Coaches
Head coach
- John MacLeod (Bellarmine)
Assistant(s)
- Al Bianchi (Bowling Green)

Legend
- (DP) Unsigned draft pick
- (FA) Free agent
- (S) Suspended
- Injured

== Regular season ==
=== Standings ===
| Pacific Division | W | L | PCT | GB | Home | Road | Div |
|---|---|---|---|---|---|---|---|
| y-Los Angeles Lakers | 53 | 29 | .646 | – | 37–4 | 16–25 | 11–5 |
| x-Portland Trail Blazers | 49 | 33 | .598 | 4 | 35–6 | 14–27 | 10–6 |
| x-Golden State Warriors | 46 | 36 | .561 | 7 | 29–12 | 17–24 | 8–8 |
| Seattle SuperSonics | 40 | 42 | .488 | 13 | 27–14 | 13–28 | 6–10 |
| Phoenix Suns | 34 | 48 | .415 | 19 | 26–15 | 8–33 | 5–11 |

| # | Western Conference | | | | |
| # | Team | W | L | PCT | GB |
|---|---|---|---|---|---|
| 1 | z-Los Angeles Lakers | 53 | 29 | .646 | – |
| 2 | y-Denver Nuggets | 50 | 32 | .610 | 3 |
| 3 | x-Portland Trail Blazers | 49 | 33 | .598 | 4 |
| 4 | x-Golden State Warriors | 46 | 36 | .561 | 7 |
| 5 | x-Detroit Pistons | 44 | 38 | .537 | 9 |
| 6 | x-Chicago Bulls | 44 | 38 | .537 | 9 |
| 7 | Kansas City Kings | 40 | 42 | .488 | 13 |
| 8 | Seattle SuperSonics | 40 | 42 | .488 | 13 |
| 9 | Indiana Pacers | 36 | 46 | .439 | 17 |
| 10 | Phoenix Suns | 34 | 48 | .415 | 19 |
| 11 | Milwaukee Bucks | 30 | 52 | .366 | 23 |

=== Game log ===
1976–77 game log
Total: 34–48 (home: 26–15; road: 8–33)
October: 1–4 (home: 0–0; road: 1–4)

| Game | Date | Team | Score | High points | Location Attendance | Record | Streak |
|---|---|---|---|---|---|---|---|
| 1 | October 22 | @ New Orleans | L 98–111 | Alvan Adams (29) | Louisiana Superdome; 12,234 | 0–1 | L 1 |
| 2 | October 23 | @ Houston | L 126–129 | Alvan Adams (29) | The Summit; 6,385 | 0–2 | L 2 |
| 3 | October 27 | @ San Antonio | L 106–115 | Alvan Adams (24) | HemisFair Arena; 8,919 | 0–3 | L 3 |
| 4 | October 29 | @ Chicago | W 95–82 | Gar Heard (23) | Chicago Stadium; 9,318 | 1–3 | W 1 |
| 5 | October 30 | @ Denver | L 107–113 | Gar Heard (28) | McNichols Sports Arena; 17,608 | 1–4 | L 1 |

November: 5–5 (home: 5–2; road: 0–3)

| Game | Date | Team | Score | High points | Location Attendance | Record | Streak |
|---|---|---|---|---|---|---|---|
| 6 | November 5 | @ Seattle | L 84–88 | Ricky Sobers (18) | Seattle Center Coliseum; 11,902 | 1–5 | L 2 |
| 7 | November 11 | Indiana | W 108–98 | Ricky Sobers, Paul Westphal (18) | Arizona Veterans Memorial Coliseum; 10,152 | 2–5 | W 1 |
| 8 | November 13 | Cleveland | L 90–103 | Ricky Sobers (20) | Arizona Veterans Memorial Coliseum; 8,671 | 2–6 | L 1 |
| 9 | November 17 | Milwaukee | W 103–95 | Dick Van Arsdale (19) | Arizona Veterans Memorial Coliseum; 7,017 | 3–6 | W 1 |
| 10 | November 18 | @ Golden State | L 111–131 | Ricky Sobers (19) | Oakland–Alameda County Coliseum Arena; 9,965 | 3–7 | L 1 |
| 11 | November 19 | N.Y. Nets | L 88–90 | Paul Westphal (17) | Arizona Veterans Memorial Coliseum; 8,506 | 3–8 | L 2 |
| 12 | November 21 | Chicago | W 101–96 | Paul Westphal (26) | Arizona Veterans Memorial Coliseum; 7,589 | 4–8 | W 1 |
| 13 | November 25 | Washington | W 104–98 | Paul Westphal (26) | Arizona Veterans Memorial Coliseum; 8,614 | 5–8 | W 2 |
| 14 | November 27 | Seattle | W 119–107 | Paul Westphal (25) | Arizona Veterans Memorial Coliseum; 10,553 | 6–8 | W 3 |
| 15 | November 30 | @ Indiana | L 97–103 | Paul Westphal (27) | Market Square Arena; 8,581 | 6–9 | L 1 |

December: 8–7 (home: 5–2; road: 3–5)

| Game | Date | Team | Score | High points | Location Attendance | Record | Streak |
|---|---|---|---|---|---|---|---|
| 16 | December 1 | @ N.Y. Nets | W 106–96 | Paul Westphal (23) | Nassau Veterans Memorial Coliseum; 5,103 | 7–9 | W 1 |
| 17 | December 3 | Portland | L 99–113 | Ricky Sobers (21) | Arizona Veterans Memorial Coliseum; 11,339 | 7–10 | L 1 |
| 18 | December 5 | San Antonio | W 103–98 (OT) | Paul Westphal (27) | Arizona Veterans Memorial Coliseum; 8,235 | 8–10 | W 1 |
| 19 | December 8 | Houston | W 116–95 | Paul Westphal (23) | Arizona Veterans Memorial Coliseum; 8,117 | 9–10 | W 2 |
| 20 | December 10 | @ Boston | W 107–103 | Ricky Sobers (25) | Boston Garden; 12,878 | 10–10 | W 3 |
| 21 | December 11 | @ N.Y. Knicks | L 96–112 | Alvan Adams (17) | Madison Square Garden; 15,263 | 10–11 | L 1 |
| 22 | December 12 | @ Atlanta | W 106–91 | Paul Westphal (28) | Omni Coliseum; 2,507 | 11–11 | W 1 |
| 23 | December 14 | @ Buffalo | L 99–108 | Ricky Sobers (23) | Buffalo Memorial Auditorium; 7,132 | 11–12 | L 1 |
| 24 | December 15 | @ Philadelphia | L 87–87 | Alvan Adams (27) | The Spectrum; 11,363 | 11–13 | L 2 |
| 25 | December 17 | @ Los Angeles | L 105–118 | Ricky Sobers, Paul Westphal (25) | The Forum; 9,816 | 11–14 | L 3 |
| 26 | December 18 | Kansas City | L 90–89 | Ricky Sobers (21) | Arizona Veterans Memorial Coliseum; 9,482 | 11–15 | L 4 |
| 27 | December 23 | Buffalo | W 107–92 | Ricky Sobers (28) | Arizona Veterans Memorial Coliseum; 10,834 | 12–15 | W 1 |
| 28 | December 25 | Los Angeles | W 113–96 | Paul Westphal (25) | Arizona Veterans Memorial Coliseum; 13,274 | 13–15 | W 2 |
| 29 | December 28 | @ Denver | L 102–110 | Paul Westphal (27) | McNichols Sports Arena; 17,595 | 13–16 | L 1 |
| 30 | December 29 | Boston | W 97–87 | Paul Westphal (30) | Arizona Veterans Memorial Coliseum; 13,274 | 14–16 | W 1 |

January: 8–9 (home: 7–1; road: 1–8)

| Game | Date | Team | Score | High points | Location Attendance | Record | Streak |
|---|---|---|---|---|---|---|---|
| 31 | January 2 | @ Kansas City | L 88–89 | Paul Westphal (20) | Omaha Civic Auditorium; 4,226 | 14–17 | L 1 |
| 32 | January 4 | @ Milwaukee | L 111–139 | Curtis Perry, Ira Terrell (20) | MECCA Arena; 8,871 | 14–18 | L 2 |
| 33 | January 5 | @ Detroit | L 115–118 | Alvan Adams (24) | Cobo Arena; 6,249 | 14–19 | L 3 |
| 34 | January 7 | @ Washington | L 89–99 | Paul Westphal (15) | Capital Centre; 6,072 | 14–20 | L 4 |
| 35 | January 8 | @ N.Y. Knicks | L 95–102 | Paul Westphal (31) | Madison Square Garden; 18,589 | 14–21 | L 5 |
| 36 | January 10 | @ Atlanta | W 93–92 | Paul Westphal (20) | Omni Coliseum; 2,408 | 15–21 | W 1 |
| 37 | January 11 | @ Chicago | L 90–93 | Paul Westphal (31) | Chicago Stadium; 6,446 | 15–22 | L 1 |
| 38 | January 13 | Detroit | W 131–101 | Paul Westphal (25) | Arizona Veterans Memorial Coliseum; 13,274 | 16–22 | W 1 |
| 39 | January 15 | Cleveland | W 94–79 | Paul Westphal (24) | Arizona Veterans Memorial Coliseum; 13,274 | 17–22 | W 2 |
| 40 | January 19 | N.Y. Knicks | W 97–90 | Paul Westphal (31) | Arizona Veterans Memorial Coliseum; 13,035 | 18–22 | W 3 |
| 41 | January 20 | @ Golden State | L 103–107 | Paul Westphal (25) | Oakland–Alameda County Coliseum Arena; 10,886 | 18–23 | L 1 |
| 42 | January 21 | Indiana | W 125–96 | Alvan Adams (29) | Arizona Veterans Memorial Coliseum; 10,957 | 19–23 | W 1 |
| 43 | January 23 | Seattle | W 98–88 | Paul Westphal (24) | Arizona Veterans Memorial Coliseum; 13,274 | 20–23 | W 2 |
| 44 | January 25 | San Antonio | L 108–116 | Paul Westphal (24) | Arizona Veterans Memorial Coliseum; 10,814 | 20–24 | L 1 |
| 45 | January 27 | Philadelphia | W 111–94 | Ron Lee (28) | Arizona Veterans Memorial Coliseum; 13,274 | 21–24 | W 1 |
| 46 | January 29 | New Orleans | W 118–102 | Paul Westphal (26) | Arizona Veterans Memorial Coliseum; 13,274 | 22–24 | W 2 |
| 47 | January 30 | @ Portland | L 91–97 | Paul Westphal (24) | Memorial Coliseum; 12,311 | 22–25 | L 1 |

February: 4–9 (home: 3–4; road: 1–5)

| Game | Date | Team | Score | High points | Location Attendance | Record | Streak |
|---|---|---|---|---|---|---|---|
| 48 | February 2 | Milwaukee | W 130–113 | Paul Westphal (29) | Arizona Veterans Memorial Coliseum; 7,364 | 23–25 | W 1 |
| 49 | February 4 | Golden State | L 106–109 | Alvan Adams (29) | Arizona Veterans Memorial Coliseum; 12,849 | 23–26 | L 1 |
| 50 | February 6 | Denver | W 115–104 | Paul Westphal (32) | Arizona Veterans Memorial Coliseum; 11,826 | 24–26 | W 1 |
| 51 | February 8 | Atlanta | W 117–104 | Alvan Adams (34) | Arizona Veterans Memorial Coliseum; 7,495 | 25–26 | W 2 |
| 52 | February 10 | Washington | L 103–109 | Paul Westphal (29) | Arizona Veterans Memorial Coliseum; 11,352 | 25–27 | L 1 |
| 53 | February 15 | @ Kansas City | L 96–102 | Paul Westphal (30) | Kemper Arena; 7,313 | 25–28 | L 2 |
| 54 | February 16 | @ Indiana | L 93–111 | Ira Terrell (15) | Market Square Arena; 9,553 | 25–29 | L 3 |
| 55 | February 18 | @ Philadelphia | W 102–96 | Paul Westphal (22) | The Spectrum; 16,660 | 26–29 | W 1 |
| 56 | February 19 | @ Cleveland | L 88–92 | Paul Westphal (23) | Coliseum at Richfield; 17,882 | 26–30 | L 1 |
| 57 | February 20 | @ Detroit | L 107–109 | Ricky Sobers (25) | Cobo Arena; 7,233 | 26–31 | L 2 |
| 58 | February 22 | @ Buffalo | L 114–115 | Alvan Adams (47) | Buffalo Memorial Auditorium; 6,143 | 26–32 | L 3 |
| 59 | February 24 | Houston | L 106–109 | Paul Westphal (31) | Arizona Veterans Memorial Coliseum; 9,835 | 26–33 | L 4 |
| 60 | February 26 | Boston | L 104–108 | Paul Westphal (22) | Arizona Veterans Memorial Coliseum; 12,353 | 26–34 | L 5 |

March: 4–12 (home: 2–5; road: 2–7)

| Game | Date | Team | Score | High points | Location Attendance | Record | Streak |
|---|---|---|---|---|---|---|---|
| 61 | March 2 | Chicago | L 104–108 (OT) | Paul Westphal (26) | Arizona Veterans Memorial Coliseum; 8,823 | 26–35 | L 6 |
| 62 | March 4 | Golden State | L 87–101 | Alvan Adams (21) | Arizona Veterans Memorial Coliseum; 8,750 | 26–36 | L 7 |
| 63 | March 6 | @ Washington | L 110–118 | Ricky Sobers (32) | Capital Centre; 14,189 | 26–37 | L 8 |
| 64 | March 8 | @ San Antonio | L 115–122 | Ricky Sobers, Paul Westphal (24) | HemisFair Arena; 10,011 | 26–38 | L 9 |
| 65 | March 9 | @ Houston | L 100–105 | Alvan Adams (26) | The Summit; 6,421 | 26–39 | L 10 |
| 66 | March 11 | @ N.Y. Nets | L 73–82 | Paul Westphal (16) | Nassau Veterans Memorial Coliseum; 6,730 | 26–40 | L 11 |
| 67 | March 13 | @ Boston | L 107–124 | Alvan Adams (29) | Boston Garden; 14,859 | 26–41 | L 12 |
| 68 | March 16 | N.Y. Knicks | W 124–91 | Paul Westphal (23) | Arizona Veterans Memorial Coliseum; 9,177 | 27–41 | W 1 |
| 69 | March 18 | New Orleans | L 100–104 | Paul Westphal (35) | Arizona Veterans Memorial Coliseum; 10,285 | 27–42 | L 1 |
| 70 | March 20 | Portland | W 126–106 | Alvan Adams (27) | Arizona Veterans Memorial Coliseum; 7,174 | 28–42 | W 1 |
| 71 | March 24 | Buffalo | L 102–107 | Paul Westphal (24) | Arizona Veterans Memorial Coliseum; 8,410 | 28–43 | L 1 |
| 72 | March 25 | @ Los Angeles | L 93–118 | Ira Terrell (22) | The Forum; 13,507 | 28–44 | L 2 |
| 73 | March 26 | Los Angeles | L 102–109 | Alvan Adams (27) | Arizona Veterans Memorial Coliseum; 8,150 | 28–45 | L 3 |
| 74 | March 27 | @ Seattle | W 121–100 | Ron Lee (33) | Seattle Center Coliseum; 14,096 | 29–45 | W 1 |
| 75 | March 29 | @ Milwaukee | W 122–110 | Paul Westphal (34) | MECCA Arena; 8,945 | 30–45 | W 2 |
| 76 | March 30 | @ New Orleans | L 100–112 | Alvan Adams (19) | Louisiana Superdome; 6,237 | 30–46 | L 1 |

April: 4–2 (home: 4–1; road: 0–1)

| Game | Date | Team | Score | High points | Location Attendance | Record | Streak |
|---|---|---|---|---|---|---|---|
| 77 | April 1 | Detroit | W 133–116 | Paul Westphal (40) | Arizona Veterans Memorial Coliseum; 8,506 | 31–46 | W 1 |
| 78 | April 3 | Denver | L 109–124 | Ron Lee (28) | Arizona Veterans Memorial Coliseum; 7,501 | 31–47 | L 1 |
| 79 | April 5 | Atlanta | W 108–102 | Ricky Sobers (25) | Arizona Veterans Memorial Coliseum; 7,668 | 32–47 | W 1 |
| 80 | April 7 | Kansas City | W 121–110 | Paul Westphal (30) | Arizona Veterans Memorial Coliseum; 8,462 | 33–47 | W 2 |
| 81 | April 8 | @ Portland | L 111–122 | Alvan Adams (26) | Memorial Coliseum; 12,536 | 33–48 | L 1 |
| 82 | April 10 | N.Y. Nets | W 128–104 | Ron Lee (21) | Arizona Veterans Memorial Coliseum; 8,476 | 34–48 | W 1 |

1976–77 schedule

== Awards and honors ==
=== All-Star ===
- Paul Westphal was voted as a starter for the Western Conference in the All-Star Game. It was his first All-Star selection. Westphal finished first in voting among Western Conference guards with 163,173 votes.

=== Season ===
- Paul Westphal was named to the All-NBA First Team.
- Ron Lee was named to the NBA All-Rookie First Team.

== Player statistics ==
Legend
| GP | Games played | GS | Games started | MPG | Minutes per game |
| FG% | Field-goal percentage | FT% | Free-throw percentage | RPG | Rebounds per game |
| APG | Assists per game | SPG | Steals per game | BPG | Blocks per game |
| PPG | Points per game |

=== Season ===
| Player | GP | GS | MPG | FG% | FT% | RPG | APG | SPG | BPG | PPG |
|---|---|---|---|---|---|---|---|---|---|---|
| Alvan Adams | 72 | 67 | 31.6 | .474 | .754 | 9.1+ | 4.5 | 1.3 | 1.2 | 18.0 |
| Dennis Awtrey | 72 | 26 | 24.4 | .429 | .722 | 4.9 | 2.5 | .3 | .4 | 5.7 |
| Keith Erickson | 50 | 3 | 19.0 | .483 | .740 | 2.9 | 2.1 | .6 | .1 | 6.4 |
| Butch Feher | 48 | 9 | 10.1 | .531+ | .768 | 1.5 | 0.8 | .2 | .1 | 5.2 |
| Garfield Heard | 46 | 35 | 29.6 | .379 | .725 | 9.6+ | 1.9 | 1.2 | 1.2 | 9.7 |
| Ron Lee | 82 | 34 | 22.5 | .441 | .676 | 3.6 | 3.2 | 1.9 | .4 | 10.2 |
| Curtis Perry | 44 | 42 | 31.6 | .432 | .789 | 9.0 | 1.8 | 1.1 | .6 | 10.7 |
| Dale Schlueter | 39 | 0 | 8.6 | .361 | .581 | 2.1 | 1.0 | .2 | .2 | 1.8 |
| Ricky Sobers | 79 | 48 | 25.4 | .496 | .841 | 3.0 | 3.0 | 1.2 | .2 | 13.6 |
| Ira Terrell | 78 | 36 | 22.4 | .508 | .631 | 5.0 | 1.3 | .5 | .6 | 8.5 |
| Dick Van Arsdale | 78 | 3 | 19.7 | .456 | .873 | 1.5 | 1.5 | .4 | .1 | 7.7 |
| Tom Van Arsdale | 77 | 28 | 18.5 | .433 | .703 | 2.4 | 0.9 | .3 | .0 | 5.8 |
| Paul Westphal | 81 | 79 | 32.1 | .518+ | .825 | 2.3 | 5.7 | 1.7 | .3 | 21.3 |

+ – Minimum 50 games played.

== Transactions ==
=== Trades ===
| August 25, 1976 | To Buffalo Braves 1977 second-round draft pick ( (United States) Glenn Williams) Cash considerations | To Phoenix Suns (United States) Tom Van Arsdale |
| March 18, 1977 | To Seattle SuperSonics 1979 second-round draft pick ( (United States) Paul Mokeski) Cash considerations | To Phoenix Suns Rights to (United States) Bayard Forrest |

=== Free agents ===
==== Additions ====
| Date | Player | Contract | Old Team |
|---|---|---|---|
| September 23, 1976 | Marv Roberts | Undisclosed | Virginia Squires (ABA) |
| December 7, 1976 | Dale Schlueter | Undisclosed | Buffalo Braves |

==== Subtractions ====
| Date | Player | Reason left | New team |
|---|---|---|---|
| August 26, 1976 | John Wetzel | Retired | —N/a |
| September 15, 1976 | Paul Miller | Waived | —N/a (Retired) |
| September 21, 1976 | Pat Riley | Retired | —N/a |
| October 3, 1976 | Carl Brown | Waived | —N/a (Retired) |
| October 4, 1976 | Al Fleming | Waived | Indiana Pacers |
| October 15, 1976 | Marv Roberts | Waived | Los Angeles Lakers |
| October 15, 1976 | Nate Hawthorne | Waived | —N/a (Retired) |
| October 15, 1976 | Phil Lumpkin | Waived | —N/a (Retired) |
