= 1976–77 Seattle SuperSonics season =

NBA professional basketball team season

- Head coach: Bill Russell
- General manager: Bill Russell
- Owners: Sam Schulman
- Arena: Seattle Center Coliseum

Results
- Record: 40–42 (.488)
- Place: Division: 4th (Pacific); Conference: 8th (Western)
- Playoff finish: Did not qualify
- Stats at Basketball Reference

Local media
- Television: KTNT-TV
- Radio: KOMO

The 1976–77 Seattle SuperSonics season was the SuperSonics' 10th season in the NBA.

== Offseason ==
=== Draft ===
Round	Pick	Player	Position	Nationality	College
1	11	Bob Wilkerson	SF/SG	United States	Indiana
2	19	Bayard Forrest	C	United States	Grand Canyon
2	29	Dennis Johnson	PG/SG	United States	Pepperdine
4	63	Willie Parr	F	United States	LeMoyne–Owen
5	80	Robert Gray	F	United States	Wichita State
6	98	Daryl Peterson	F	United States	Wake Forest
7	116	Mark Klein	G	United States	Malone
8	134	Norton Barnhill	SG	United States	Washington State
9	151	Ron Johnson	F	United States	North Carolina A&T
10	167	Ricky Lewis	F	United States	Alcorn State

== Roster ==
1976–77 Seattle SuperSonics roster
Players

Pos.	No.	Player	Height	Weight	DOB	From
PF	40	Mike Bantom	6 ft 9 in (2.06 m)	200 lb (91 kg)	1951–12–03	Saint Joseph's
SG	10	Norton Barnhill	6 ft 4 in (1.93 m)	205 lb (93 kg)	1953–07–15	Washington State
G	32	Fred Brown	6 ft 3 in (1.91 m)	182 lb (83 kg)	1948–08–07	Iowa
C	16	Tommy Burleson	7 ft 2 in (2.18 m)	225 lb (102 kg)	1952–02–24	NC State
F	11	Leonard Gray	6 ft 8 in (2.03 m)	240 lb (109 kg)	1951–12–19	Long Beach State
C	23	Mike Green	6 ft 10 in (2.08 m)	200 lb (91 kg)	1951–08–06	Louisiana Tech
G	24	Dennis Johnson	6 ft 4 in (1.93 m)	185 lb (84 kg)	1954–09–18	Pepperdine
SF	10	Bob Love	6 ft 8 in (2.03 m)	215 lb (98 kg)	1942–12–08	Southern
F	15	Willie Norwood	6 ft 7 in (2.01 m)	220 lb (100 kg)	1947–08–08	Alcorn State
G	44	Frank Oleynick	6 ft 2 in (1.88 m)	185 lb (84 kg)	1955–02–20	Seattle
F	45	Bruce Seals	6 ft 8 in (2.03 m)	210 lb (95 kg)	1953–06–18	Xavier (LA)
PF	20	Dean Tolson	6 ft 8 in (2.03 m)	190 lb (86 kg)	1951–11–25	Arkansas
G	13	Donald Watts	6 ft 1 in (1.85 m)	175 lb (79 kg)	1951–07–22	Xavier (LA)
SF	12	Nick Weatherspoon	6 ft 7 in (2.01 m)	195 lb (88 kg)	1950–07–20	Illinois
SF	33	Bob Wilkerson	6 ft 6 in (1.98 m)	195 lb (88 kg)	1954–08–15	Indiana

Coaches
Head coach
- Bill Russell
Assistant(s)
- Bob Hopkins

Legend
- (DP) Unsigned draft pick
- (FA) Free agent
- (S) Suspended
- Injured

Roster

== Standings ==
=== Division ===
Pacific Division	W	L	PCT	GB	Home	Road	Div
y-Los Angeles Lakers	53	29	.646	–	37–4	16–25	11–5
x-Portland Trail Blazers	49	33	.598	4	35–6	14–27	10–6
x-Golden State Warriors	46	36	.561	7	29–12	17–24	8–8
Seattle SuperSonics	40	42	.488	13	27–14	13–28	6–10
Phoenix Suns	34	48	.415	19	26–15	8–33	5–11

=== Conference ===
#	Western Conference				
#	Team	W	L	PCT	GB
1	z-Los Angeles Lakers	53	29	.646	–
2	y-Denver Nuggets	50	32	.610	3
3	x-Portland Trail Blazers	49	33	.598	4
4	x-Golden State Warriors	46	36	.561	7
5	x-Detroit Pistons	44	38	.537	9
6	x-Chicago Bulls	44	38	.537	9
7	Kansas City Kings	40	42	.488	13
8	Seattle SuperSonics	40	42	.488	13
9	Indiana Pacers	36	46	.439	17
10	Phoenix Suns	34	48	.415	19
11	Milwaukee Bucks	30	52	.366	23

== Game log ==
1976–77 game log
Total: 40–42 (Home: 27–14; Road: 13–28)
October

Game	Date	Team	Score	High points	High rebounds	High assists	Location Attendance	Record
1	October 24	New York Nets	w 104–93				Seattle Center Coliseum; 7,217	1–0
2	October 26	@ Indiana	L 90–120				Market Square Arena; 11,568	1–1
3	October 27	@ Detroit	L 92–106				Cobo Arena; 15,223	1–2
4	October 29	Detroit	W 106–103				Seattle Center Coliseum; 10,427	2–2
5	October 31	Atlanta	W 126–112				Seattle Center Coliseum; 11,992	3–2

November

Game	Date	Team	Score	High points	High rebounds	High assists	Location Attendance	Record
6	November 2	@ Milwaukee	L 113–125				MECCA Arena; 10,290	3–3
7	November 3	@ Kansas City	L 106–126				Kemper Arena; 16,014	3–4
8	November 5	Phoenix	W 88–84				Seattle Center Coliseum; 13,665	4–4
9	November 7	Philadelphia	W 98–91				Seattle Center Coliseum; 15,001	5–4
10	November 9	@ San Antonio	L 114–138				HemisFair Arena; 16,002	5–5
11	November 10	@ Houston	L 97–99				The Summit; 14,386	5–6
12	November 12	Kansas City	W 102–97				Seattle Center Coliseum; 9,111	6–6
13	November 14	Indiana	W 121–118				Seattle Center Coliseum; 12,070	7–6
14	November 16	@ Golden State	L 102–110				Oakland-Alameda County Coliseum Arena; 18,056	7–7
15	November 17	Cleveland	W 92–78				Seattle Center Coliseum; 14,880	8–7
16	November 19	Buffalo	W 130–101				Seattle Center Coliseum; 17,003	9–7
17	November 21	Milwaukee	W 115–106				Seattle Center Coliseum; 10,059	10–7
18	November 26	Chicago	W 101–97				Seattle Center Coliseum; 17,002	11–7
19	November 27	@ Phoenix	L 107–119				Arizona Veterans Memorial Coliseum; 7,991	11–8
20	November 28	Washington	W 117–116				Seattle Center Coliseum; 13,747	12–8
21	November 30	@ Buffalo	L 114–119				Buffalo Memorial Auditorium; 9,119	12–9

December

Game	Date	Team	Score	High points	High rebounds	High assists	Location Attendance	Record
22	December 1	@ Boston	L 103–107				Boston Garden; 11,550	12–10
23	December 3	@ Philadelphia	W 121–112				The Spectrum; 18,559	13–10
24	December 4	@ New York Knicks	L 96–103				Madison Square Garden; 9,200	13–11
25	December 7	@ New Orleans	L 98–110				Louisiana Superdome; 13,072	13–12
26	December 8	@ Washington	W 109–99				Capital Centre; 19,000	14–12
27	December 10	Golden State	W 99–93				Seattle Center Coliseum; 7,881	15–12
28	December 12	Houston	L 92–96				Seattle Center Coliseum; 8,666	15–13
29	December 15	Denver	L 103–117				Seattle Center Coliseum; 8,133	15–14
30	December 19	Buffalo	L 98–99				Seattle Center Coliseum; 9,204	15–15
31	December 21	@ Chicago	L 101–103 (2OT)				Chicago Stadium; 16,000	15–16
32	December 23	@ Denver	L 95–123				McNichols Sports Arena; 12,789	15–17
33	December 25	@ Portland	L 95–110				Veterans Memorial Coliseum; 10,551	15–18
34	December 26	Portland	W 89–87				Seattle Center Coliseum; 7,128	16–18
35	December 28	@ Atlanta	W 120–119				Omni Coliseum; 15,579	17–18
36	December 29	New York Nets	W 102–96				Nassau Veterans Memorial Coliseum; 7,186	18–18
37	December 30	@ Cleveland	L 100–105				Coliseum at Richfield; 20,001	18–19

January

Game	Date	Team	Score	High points	High rebounds	High assists	Location Attendance	Record
38	January 2	Chicago	W 83–79				Seattle Center Coliseum; 17,071	19–19
39	January 5	Boston	W 94–93				Seattle Center Coliseum; 17,070	20–19
40	January 7	San Antonio	W 131–124				Seattle Center Coliseum; 17,070	21–19
41	January 9	New Orleans	W 92–76				Seattle Center Coliseum; 17,068	22–19
42	January 12	Detroit	W 121–99				Seattle Center Coliseum; 16,998	23–19
43	January 14	New York Knicks	W 127–107				Seattle Center Coliseum; 14,098	24–19
44	January 16	Denver	L 101–109				Seattle Center Coliseum; 14,098	24–20
45	January 19	Indiana	W 109–102				Seattle Center Coliseum; 12,081	25–20
46	January 21	@ Denver	L 106–120				McNichols Sports Arena; 16,222	25–21
47	January 23	@ Phoenix	L 88–98				Arizona Veterans Memorial Coliseum; 13,274	25–22
48	January 25	@ Los Angeles	L 109–120				The Forum; 11,273	25–23
49	January 26	Los Angeles	W 118–103				Seattle Center Coliseum; 13,037	26–23
50	January 30	San Antonio	L 118–126 (OT)				Seattle Center Coliseum; 14,098	26–24

February

Game	Date	Team	Score	High points	High rebounds	High assists	Location Attendance	Record
51	February 2	New Orleans	W 120–95				Seattle Center Coliseum; 12,552	27–24
52	February 4	Washington	L 106–109				Seattle Center Coliseum; 14,098	27–25
53	February 6	Milwaukee	W 107–99				Seattle Center Coliseum; 13,572	28–25
54	February 9	Atlanta	L 98–99				Seattle Center Coliseum; 10,593	28–26
55	February 11	Golden State	W 114–107 (OT)				Seattle Center Coliseum; 13,375	29–26
56	February 15	@ San Antonio	L 106–109 (OT)				HemisFair Arena; 7,781	29–27
57	February 16	@ Houston	L 95–124				The Summit; 5,237	29–28
58	February 18	@ New York Nets	W 93–88				Nassau Veterans Memorial Coliseum; 6,775	30–28
59	February 19	@ Buffalo	L 100–103				Buffalo Memorial Auditorium; 11,079	30–29
60	February 20	@ Indiana	L 115–135				Market Square Arena; 9,110	30–30
61	February 23	@ Kansas City	W 94–93				Kemper Arena; 9,416	31–30
62	February 25	Boston	L 92–102				Seattle Center Coliseum; 14,098	31–31
63	February 27	Philadelphia	L 85–93				Seattle Center Coliseum; 14,098	31–32

March

Game	Date	Team	Score	High points	High rebounds	High assists	Location Attendance	Record
64	March 2	Cleveland	L 85–105				Seattle Center Coliseum; 13,017	31–33
65	March 5	@ Portland	L 104–134				Memorial Coliseum; 12,229	31–34
66	March 8	@ New Orleans	W 96–91				Louisiana Superdome; 10,522	32–34
67	March 9	@ Boston	W 114–86				Boston Garden; 14,692	33–34
68	March 11	@ Philadelphia	L 122–126				The Spectrum; 16,268	33–35
69	March 12	@ New York Knicks	W 91–88				Madison Square Garden; 15,599	34–35
70	March 16	@ Washington	W 100–96				Capital Centre; 9,793	35–35
71	March 18	@ Detroit	W 105–104				Cobo Arena; 10,524	36–35
72	March 19	@ Chicago	L 92–104				Chicago Stadium; 18,674	36–36
73	March 20	@ Milwaukee	W 110–107				MECCA Arena; 9,047	37–36
74	March 22	@ Cleveland	L 104–108				Coliseum at Richfield; 10,041	37–37
75	March 27	Phoenix	L 100–121				Seattle Center Coliseum; 14,098	37–38
76	March 29	@ Los Angeles	L 97–100				The Forum; 11,661	37–39
77	March 30	Houston	W 111–105				Seattle Center Coliseum; 13,371	38–39
78	April 2	@ Golden State	W 109–102				Oakland-Alameda County Coliseum Arena; 12,741	39–39
79	April 3	Portland	L 104–119				Seattle Center Coliseum; 14,098	39–40
80	April 5	New York Nets	L 86–88				Seattle Center Coliseum; 13,774	39–41
81	April 8	Kansas City	W 112–105				Seattle Center Coliseum; 13,465	40–41
82	April 10	@ Los Angeles	L 104–113				Seattle Center Coliseum; 14,098	40–42

== Player statistics ==
Legend
GP	Games played	GS	Games started	MPG	Minutes per game
FG%	Field-goal percentage	3P%	3-point field-goal percentage	FT%	Free-throw percentage
RPG	Rebounds per game	APG	Assists per game	SPG	Steals per game
BPG	Blocks per game	PPG	Points per game

Player	GP	GS	MPG	FG%	3FG%	FT%	RPG	APG	SPG	BPG	PPG
Mike Bantom	44		18.1	.488		.690	4.2	1.2	0.8	0.5	7.5
Norton Barnhill	4		2.5	.333			0.8	0.3	0.0	0.0	1.0
Fred Brown	72		29.1	.479		.884	3.2	2.4	1.7	0.3	17.2
Tom Burleson	82		22.0	.442		.731	6.7	1.1	0.9	1.4	9.7
Leonard Gray	25		25.7	.435		.756	4.3	2.2	1.1	0.5	11.5
Mike Green	76		25.4	.441		.706	6.6	1.6	0.6	1.7	9.8
Dennis Johnson	81		20.6	.504		.624	3.7	1.5	1.5	0.7	9.2
Bob Love	32		14.1	.372		.872	2.7	0.7	0.4	0.1	7.7
Willie Norwood	76		21.7	.469		.733	3.8	1.3	0.8	0.1	4.0
Frank Oleynick	50		10.3	.363		.736	0.9	1.2	0.3	0.1	4.0
Bruce Seals	81		24.4	.444		.708	4.4	1.1	0.6	0.7	11.0
Dean Tolson	60		9.8	.566		.535	2.6	0.5	0.5	0.4	6.0
Slick Watts	79		33.3	.422		.587	3.9	8.0	2.7	0.3	13.0
Nick Weatherspoon	51		29.5	.461		.632	7.9	1.0	1.0	0.5	12.8
Bob Wilkerson	78		19.9	.386		.689	3.3	2.2	0.9	0.1	6.7
