= 1976–77 Denver Nuggets season =

NBA professional basketball team season (1st season in NBA)

- Division champions
- Head coach: Larry Brown
- Arena: McNichols Sports Arena

Results
- Record: 50–32 (.610)
- Place: Division: 1st (Midwest); Conference: 2nd (Western)
- Playoff finish: West Conference semifinals (lost to Trail Blazers 2–4)
- Stats at Basketball Reference

Local media
- Television: KWGN-TV
- Radio: KOA

The 1976–77 Denver Nuggets season, is the Nuggets first season in the NBA, after nine seasons in the ABA.

In their NBA playoffs debut, the Nuggets lost to the eventual NBA champion Portland Trail Blazers in six games in the First Round.

== Offseason ==
=== ABA-NBA merger ===
With the conclusion of the 1975–76 season, the American Basketball Association came to an end with the ABA-NBA merger. Four ABA teams entered the NBA: the Nuggets, the Indiana Pacers, the New York Nets and the San Antonio Spurs. The other ABA teams were folded prior to the merger except for the Kentucky Colonels and Spirits of St. Louis, both of which were folded as part of the league merger.

The Nuggets and the other ABA teams were given harsh obstacles as part of their entry to the NBA. Each team had to pay an entry fee; for the Nuggets it was $3.2 million. The Denver and the other four ABA team also received no television money for their first three NBA seasons in the NBA, were not allowed to participate in the 1976 NBA draft, had to be classified as "expansion franchises" (despite longer histories and more success than many NBA teams) and had to go for two years without any vote regarding the distribution of NBA gate receipts or the realignment of NBA divisions.

The Nuggets moved from the ABA to the NBA's Midwest Division.

=== NBA draft ===
As part of the terms of the ABA-NBA merger the Nuggets were prohibited from participating in both the 1976 NBA draft of college players and in the dispersal draft of ABA players from teams that did not enter the NBA.

== Roster ==
1976–77 Denver Nuggets roster
Players

Pos.	No.	Player	Height	Weight	DOB	From
PF	40	Byron Beck	6 ft 9 in (2.06 m)	225 lb (102 kg)	1945-01-25	Denver
PG	20	Mack Calvin	6 ft 0 in (1.83 m)	165 lb (75 kg)	1947-07-27	USC
C	44	Dan Issel	6 ft 9 in (2.06 m)	235 lb (107 kg)	1948-10-25	Kentucky
PF	24	Bobby Jones	6 ft 9 in (2.06 m)	210 lb (95 kg)	1951-12-18	North Carolina
SG	12	Ted McClain	6 ft 1 in (1.85 m)	180 lb (82 kg)	1946-08-30	Tennessee State
PF	35	Paul Silas	6 ft 7 in (2.01 m)	220 lb (100 kg)	1943-07-12	Creighton
PG	21	Fatty Taylor	6 ft 0 in (1.83 m)	175 lb (79 kg)	1946-03-13	La Salle
SG	33	David Thompson	6 ft 4 in (1.93 m)	195 lb (88 kg)	1954-07-13	NC State
C	10	Marvin Webster	7 ft 1 in (2.16 m)	225 lb (102 kg)	1952-04-13	Morgan State
SF	42	Willie Wise	6 ft 5 in (1.96 m)	210 lb (95 kg)	1947-03-03	Drake

Coaches
Head coach
- Larry Brown
Assistant(s)
- Frank Hamblen

Legend
- (DP) Unsigned draft pick
- (FA) Free agent
- (S) Suspended
- Injured

== Regular season ==
=== Season standings ===
Midwest Division	W	L	PCT	GB	Home	Road	Div
y-Denver Nuggets	50	32	.610	–	36–5	14–27	15–5
x-Detroit Pistons	44	38	.537	6	30–11	14–27	12–8
x-Chicago Bulls	44	38	.537	6	31–10	13–28	10–10
Kansas City Kings	40	42	.488	10	28–13	12–29	7–13
Indiana Pacers	36	46	.439	14	25–16	11–30	9–11
Milwaukee Bucks	30	52	.366	20	24–17	6–35	7–13

#	Western Conference				
#	Team	W	L	PCT	GB
1	z-Los Angeles Lakers	53	29	.646	–
2	y-Denver Nuggets	50	32	.610	3
3	x-Portland Trail Blazers	49	33	.598	4
4	x-Golden State Warriors	46	36	.561	7
5	x-Detroit Pistons	44	38	.537	9
6	x-Chicago Bulls	44	38	.537	9
7	Kansas City Kings	40	42	.488	13
8	Seattle SuperSonics	40	42	.488	13
9	Indiana Pacers	36	46	.439	17
10	Phoenix Suns	34	48	.415	19
11	Milwaukee Bucks	30	52	.366	23

== Game log ==
=== Regular season ===
1976–77 game log
Total: 50–32 (home: 33–8; road: 17–24)
October: 4–0 (home: 1–0; road: 3–0)

Game	Date	Team	Score	High points	High rebounds	High assists	Location Attendance	Record

November: 8–5 (home: 6–0; road: 2–5)

Game	Date	Team	Score	High points	High rebounds	High assists	Location Attendance	Record

December: 10–5 (home: 7–1; road: 3–4)

Game	Date	Team	Score	High points	High rebounds	High assists	Location Attendance	Record

January: 9–5 (home: 7–2; road: 2–3)

Game	Date	Team	Score	High points	High rebounds	High assists	Location Attendance	Record
35	January 4	@ Atlanta	L 109–113				The Omni	24–11

February: 8–5 (home: 6–0; road: 2–5)

Game	Date	Team	Score	High points	High rebounds	High assists	Location Attendance	Record
All-Star Break
56	February 20	Atlanta	W 111–95				McNichols Sports Arena	37–19

March: 7–9 (home: 5–2; road: 2–7)

Game	Date	Team	Score	High points	High rebounds	High assists	Location Attendance	Record
66	March 11	@ Atlanta	L 95–100				The Omni	42–24

April: 3–3 (home: 1–0; road: 2–3)

Game	Date	Team	Score	High points	High rebounds	High assists	Location Attendance	Record
79	April 6	Atlanta	W 110–95				McNichols Sports Arena	49–30

1976–77 schedule

=== Playoffs ===
1977 playoff game log
Western Conference Semifinals: 2–4 (home: 2–1; road: 0–3)

Game	Date	Team	Score	High points	High rebounds	High assists	Location Attendance	Series
1	April 20	Portland	L 100–101	Dan Issel (28)	Paul Silas (11)	Ted McClain (5)	McNichols Sports Arena; 17,995	0–1
2	April 23	Portland	W 121–110	Dan Issel (36)	Paul Silas (9)	Jones, McClain (7)	McNichols Sports Arena; 17,975	1–1
3	April 24	@ Portland	L 106–110	David Thompson (40)	Jones, Issel (9)	Bobby Jones (5)	Memorial Coliseum; 12,736	1–2
4	April 26	@ Portland	L 96–105	Mack Calvin (28)	Jones, Silas (8)	Paul Silas (4)	Memorial Coliseum; 12,930	1–3
5	May 1	Portland	W 114–105 (OT)	David Thompson (31)	Dan Issel (18)	Jim Price (11)	McNichols Sports Arena; 17,517	2–3
6	May 2	@ Portland	L 92–108	David Thompson (17)	Marvin Webster (16)	Ted McClain (7)	Memorial Coliseum; 12,924	2–4

1977 schedule

== Awards, records, and honors ==
- David Thompson, All-NBA First Team
- Bobby Jones, NBA All-Defensive First Team
