= 1976–77 Los Angeles Lakers season =

Season of National Basketball Association team the Los Angeles Lakers

- Division champions
- Head coach: Jerry West
- General manager: Bill Sharman
- Owner: Jack Kent Cooke
- Arena: The Forum

Results
- Record: 53–29 (.646)
- Place: Division: 1st (Pacific); Conference: 1st (Western)
- Playoff finish: Conference finals (lost to Trail Blazers 0–4)
- Stats at Basketball Reference

Local media
- Television: KTLA
- Radio: KABC

The 1976–77 Los Angeles Lakers season was the Lakers' 29th season in the NBA and 17th season in Los Angeles. The Lakers would both win the Pacific Division and make the playoffs after a two-year hiatus in their second season with Kareem Abdul-Jabbar as their top player. Their season ended in the Western Conference Finals, where they were swept by eventual champion Portland Trail Blazers in four straight games.

== Roster ==
1976–77 Los Angeles Lakers roster
Players

Pos.	No.	Player	Height	Weight	DOB	From
C	33	Kareem Abdul-Jabbar	7 ft 2 in (2.18 m)	225 lb (102 kg)	1947-04-16	UCLA
SF	5	Tom Abernethy	6 ft 7 in (2.01 m)	220 lb (100 kg)	1954-05-06	Indiana
PG	42	Lucius Allen	6 ft 2 in (1.88 m)	175 lb (79 kg)	1947-09-26	UCLA
SG	12	Don Chaney	6 ft 5 in (1.96 m)	210 lb (95 kg)	1946-03-22	Houston
PF	35	Don Ford	6 ft 9 in (2.06 m)	215 lb (98 kg)	1952-12-31	UC Santa Barbara
SF	41	C. J. Kupec	6 ft 6 in (1.98 m)	220 lb (100 kg)	1953-01-26	Michigan
PG	11	Bo Lamar	6 ft 1 in (1.85 m)	180 lb (82 kg)	1951-04-07	Louisiana
PG	23	Stu Lantz	6 ft 3 in (1.91 m)	175 lb (79 kg)	1946-07-13	Nebraska
SG	21	Johnny Neumann	6 ft 6 in (1.98 m)	200 lb (91 kg)	1951-09-11	Mississippi
SF	30	Marv Roberts	6 ft 8 in (2.03 m)	200 lb (91 kg)	1950-01-29	Utah State
SF	32	Cazzie Russell	6 ft 5 in (1.96 m)	218 lb (99 kg)	1944-06-07	Michigan
SG	43	Earl Tatum	6 ft 5 in (1.96 m)	185 lb (84 kg)	1953-07-26	Marquette
PF	24	Kermit Washington	6 ft 8 in (2.03 m)	230 lb (104 kg)	1951-09-17	American

Coaches
Head coach
- Jerry West
Assistant(s)
- Stan Albeck
- Jack McCloskey

Legend
- (DP) Unsigned draft pick
- (FA) Free agent
- (S) Suspended
- Injured

Roster
Updated: November 18, 1976

== Regular season ==
=== Season standings ===
Pacific Division	W	L	PCT	GB	Home	Road	Div
y-Los Angeles Lakers	53	29	.646	–	37–4	16–25	11–5
x-Portland Trail Blazers	49	33	.598	4	35–6	14–27	10–6
x-Golden State Warriors	46	36	.561	7	29–12	17–24	8–8
Seattle SuperSonics	40	42	.488	13	27–14	13–28	6–10
Phoenix Suns	34	48	.415	19	26–15	8–33	5–11

#	Western Conference				
#	Team	W	L	PCT	GB
1	z-Los Angeles Lakers	53	29	.646	–
2	y-Denver Nuggets	50	32	.610	3
3	x-Portland Trail Blazers	49	33	.598	4
4	x-Golden State Warriors	46	36	.561	7
5	x-Detroit Pistons	44	38	.537	9
6	x-Chicago Bulls	44	38	.537	9
7	Kansas City Kings	40	42	.488	13
8	Seattle SuperSonics	40	42	.488	13
9	Indiana Pacers	36	46	.439	17
10	Phoenix Suns	34	48	.415	19
11	Milwaukee Bucks	30	52	.366	23

z – clinched division title
y – clinched division title
x – clinched playoff spot

== Playoffs ==
1977 playoff game log
Conference semifinals: 4–3 (home: 4–0; road: 0–3)

Game	Date	Team	Score	High points	High rebounds	High assists	Location Attendance	Series
1	April 20	Golden State	W 115–106	Kareem Abdul-Jabbar (27)	Kareem Abdul-Jabbar (16)	Kareem Abdul-Jabbar (7)	The Forum; 15,928	1–0
2	April 22	Golden State	W 95–86	Kareem Abdul-Jabbar (40)	Kareem Abdul-Jabbar (19)	Cazzie Russell (7)	The Forum; 17,505	2–0
3	April 24	@ Golden State	L 105–109	Kareem Abdul-Jabbar (28)	Abdul-Jabbar, Ford (14)	Abdul-Jabbar, Chaney (7)	Oakland–Alameda County Coliseum Arena; 13,155	2–1
4	April 26	@ Golden State	L 103–114	Kareem Abdul-Jabbar (41)	Kareem Abdul-Jabbar (18)	Tom Abernethy (5)	Oakland–Alameda County Coliseum Arena; 13,155	2–2
5	April 29	Golden State	W 112–105	Kareem Abdul-Jabbar (45)	Kareem Abdul-Jabbar (18)	Don Chaney (6)	The Forum; 17,505	3–2
6	May 1	@ Golden State	L 106–115	Kareem Abdul-Jabbar (43)	Kareem Abdul-Jabbar (20)	Lucius Allen (7)	Oakland–Alameda County Coliseum Arena; 13,155	3–3
7	May 4	Golden State	W 97–84	Kareem Abdul-Jabbar (36)	Kareem Abdul-Jabbar (26)	Bo Lamar (6)	The Forum; 17,505	4–3

Conference finals: 0–4 (home: 0–2; road: 0–2)

Game	Date	Team	Score	High points	High rebounds	High assists	Location Attendance	Series
1	May 6	Portland	L 109–121	Earl Tatum (32)	Kareem Abdul-Jabbar (10)	Abdul-Jabbar, Warner (5)	The Forum; 16,975	0–1
2	May 8	Portland	L 97–99	Kareem Abdul-Jabbar (40)	Kareem Abdul-Jabbar (17)	three players tied (5)	The Forum; 15,192	0–2
3	May 10	@ Portland	L 97–102	Kareem Abdul-Jabbar (21)	Kareem Abdul-Jabbar (20)	Kareem Abdul-Jabbar (7)	Memorial Coliseum; 12,926	0–3
4	May 13	@ Portland	L 101–105	Kareem Abdul-Jabbar (30)	Kareem Abdul-Jabbar (17)	Lucius Allen (6)	Memorial Coliseum; 12,904	0–4

1977 schedule

== Awards and records ==
- Kareem Abdul-Jabbar, NBA Most Valuable Player Award
- Kareem Abdul-Jabbar, All-NBA First Team
- Kareem Abdul-Jabbar, NBA All-Defensive Second Team
- Kareem Abdul-Jabbar, NBA All-Star Game
- Don Chaney, NBA All-Defensive Second Team
