= 1976–77 Indiana Pacers season =

Basketball team season (1st in NBA)

- Head coach: Bobby Leonard
- Arena: Market Square Arena

Results
- Record: 36–46 (.439)
- Place: Division: 5th (Midwest); Conference: 9th (Western)
- Playoff finish: Did not qualify
- Stats at Basketball Reference

Local media
- Television: WTTV
- Radio: WIBC

The 1976–77 NBA season was Indiana's first season in the NBA and tenth season as a franchise.

== Offseason ==
=== Draft picks ===
Round	Pick	Player	Position	Nationality	College
1	8	Wil Jones†	PF	United States	Albany State

†In the 1976 ABA Dispersal Draft, ABA and NBA teams selected players that were on the Kentucky Colonels and the Spirits of St. Louis, the two ABA teams that were not included in the ABA–NBA merger in 1976. Wil Jones was a member of the Kentucky Colonels during the 1975–76 ABA season. Because the Pacers were in the ABA before the merger, they did not have any picks in the 1976 NBA draft.

== Roster ==
1976–77 Indiana Pacers roster
Players

Pos.	No.	Player	Height	Weight	DOB	From
SG	21	Jerome Anderson	6 ft 5 in (1.96 m)	195 lb (88 kg)		West Virginia
PF	9	Mel Bennett	6 ft 7 in (2.01 m)	200 lb (91 kg)		Pittsburgh
PG	10	Don Buse	6 ft 4 in (1.93 m)	190 lb (86 kg)		Evansville
C	41	Len Elmore	6 ft 9 in (2.06 m)	220 lb (100 kg)		Maryland
SG	44	Mike Flynn	6 ft 2 in (1.88 m)	180 lb (82 kg)		Kentucky
SF	24	Steve Green	6 ft 7 in (2.01 m)	220 lb (100 kg)		Indiana
F	20	Darnell Hillman	6 ft 9 in (2.06 m)	215 lb (98 kg)		San José State
PF	22	Wil Jones	6 ft 8 in (2.03 m)	205 lb (93 kg)		Albany State
SF	25	Billy Knight	6 ft 6 in (1.98 m)	195 lb (88 kg)		Pittsburgh
C	40	Dave Robisch	6 ft 10 in (2.08 m)	235 lb (107 kg)		Kansas
PF	32	Dan Roundfield	6 ft 8 in (2.03 m)	205 lb (93 kg)		Central Michigan
SG	23	John Williamson	6 ft 2 in (1.88 m)	185 lb (84 kg)		New Mexico State

Coaches
Head coach
- Slick Leonard
Assistant(s)
- Jerry Oliver

Legend
- (DP) Unsigned draft pick
- (FA) Free agent
- (S) Suspended
- Injured

== Regular season ==
Buoyed by the sensational playmaking of Don Buse and scoring of Billy Knight, The Pacers hovered around the .500 mark for much of the first half of their inaugural NBA season but a lack of depth and a few injuries blunted the Pacers progress. The Pacers were significantly hampered by injuries to center, Len Elmore, who missed all but six games.

=== Season standings ===
Midwest Division	W	L	PCT	GB	Home	Road	Div
y-Denver Nuggets	50	32	.610	–	36–5	14–27	15–5
x-Detroit Pistons	44	38	.537	6	30–11	14–27	12–8
x-Chicago Bulls	44	38	.537	6	31–10	13–28	10–10
Kansas City Kings	40	42	.488	10	28–13	12–29	7–13
Indiana Pacers	36	46	.439	14	25–16	11–30	9–11
Milwaukee Bucks	30	52	.366	20	24–17	6–35	7–13

#	Western Conference				
#	Team	W	L	PCT	GB
1	z-Los Angeles Lakers	53	29	.646	–
2	y-Denver Nuggets	50	32	.610	3
3	x-Portland Trail Blazers	49	33	.598	4
4	x-Golden State Warriors	46	36	.561	7
5	x-Detroit Pistons	44	38	.537	9
6	x-Chicago Bulls	44	38	.537	9
7	Kansas City Kings	40	42	.488	13
8	Seattle SuperSonics	40	42	.488	13
9	Indiana Pacers	36	46	.439	17
10	Phoenix Suns	34	48	.415	19
11	Milwaukee Bucks	30	52	.366	23

z – clinched division title
y – clinched division title
x – clinched playoff spot

== Player statistics ==
=== Regular season ===
Player	POS	GP	GS	MP	REB	AST	STL	BLK	PTS	MPG	RPG	APG	SPG	BPG	PPG
Darnell Hillman	C	82		2,302	693	166	95	106	879	28.1	8.5	2.0	1.2	1.3	10.7
Don Buse	PG	81		2,947	270	685	281	16	646	36.4	3.3	8.5	3.5	.2	8.0
Wil Jones	PF	80		2,709	604	189	102	80	1,042	33.9	7.6	2.4	1.3	1.0	13.0
Dave Robisch	C	80		1,966	554	158	55	37	951	24.6	6.9	2.0	.7	.5	11.9
Billy Knight	SF	78		3,117	582	260	117	19	2,075	40.0	7.5	3.3	1.5	.2	26.6
Mike Flynn	SG	73		1,324	187	179	57	6	601	18.1	2.6	2.5	.8	.1	8.2
Steve Green	SF	70		918	177	46	46	12	450	13.1	2.5	.7	.7	.2	6.4
Mel Bennett	PF	67		911	237	70	37	33	314	13.6	3.5	1.0	.6	.5	4.7
Dan Roundfield	PF	61		1,645	518	69	61	131	848	27.0	8.5	1.1	1.0	2.1	13.9
Freddie Lewis	PG	32		552	47	56	18	2	224	17.3	1.5	1.8	.6	.1	7.0
John Williamson^{†}	SG	30		1,055	74	111	48	7	620	35.2	2.5	3.7	1.6	.2	20.7
Jerome Anderson	SG	27		164	12	10	6	2	66	6.1	.4	.4	.2	.1	2.4
Len Elmore	C	6		46	15	2	0	4	18	7.7	2.5	.3	.0	.7	3.0
Darrell Elston	SG	5		40	6	2	1	0	5	8.0	1.2	.4	.2	.0	1.0
Rudy Hackett^{†}	PF	5		38	10	3	0	1	12	7.6	2.0	.6	.0	.2	2.4
Clyde Mayes^{†}	PF	2		21	7	3	0	2	7	10.5	3.5	1.5	.0	1.0	3.5

- ^{†} Denotes player spent time with another team in the season. Stats reflect time with the Pacers only.

== Awards and records ==
- Billy Knight, NBA All-Star Game
- Don Buse, NBA All-Star Game
- Don Buse, NBA All-Defensive First Team
