= 1976–77 Portland Trail Blazers season =

NBA professional basketball team season

- NBA champions
- Conference champions
- Head coach: Jack Ramsay
- General manager: Harry Glickman
- Owner: Larry Weinberg
- Arena: Memorial Coliseum

Results
- Record: 49–33 (.598)
- Place: Division: 2nd (Pacific); Conference: 3rd (Western)
- Playoff finish: NBA champions (defeated 76ers 4–2)
- Stats at Basketball Reference

Local media
- Television: KOIN
- Radio: KYTE

The 1976–77 Portland Trail Blazers season was the Portland Trail Blazers' seventh season in the National Basketball Association (NBA). The revamped Trail Blazers had an exceptional start, winning 22 of their first 31 games. The team won their last 5 games to post a record of 49–33. The Trail Blazers reached the playoffs for the first time in franchise history and proceeded to stampede through the postseason. By the time the Blazers had made it to the 1977 NBA Finals, the city of Portland was truly in the grips of "Blazermania". After losing the first two games of the championship series at Philadelphia, the Trail Blazers won four in a row to bring the trophy to Portland. The championship capped the team's first winning season. The Blazers had a 35–6 record at home, which included a perfect 10–0 mark in the playoffs, compared to a 14-27 road record.

As of 2026, this remains the only NBA championship in Blazers franchise history, though they made NBA Finals appearances in 1990 and 1992, losing to the Detroit Pistons and Chicago Bulls, respectively.

== Offseason ==
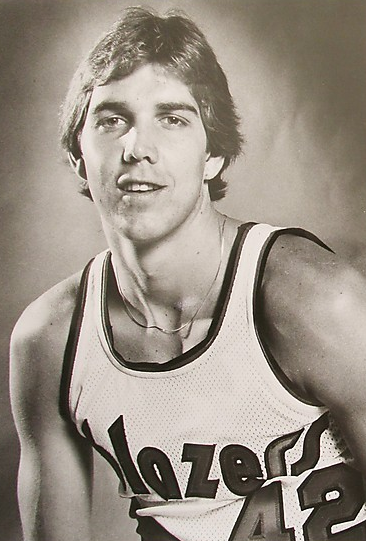
Wally Walker was the fifth overall pick in the 1976 NBA draft.

=== NBA draft ===
Note: This is not a complete list; only the first three rounds are covered, as well as any other picks by the franchise who played at least one NBA game.

Round	Pick	Player	Position	Nationality	School/Club team
1	5	Wally Walker	F	United States	Virginia
2	20	Major Jones	F	United States	Albany State
2	22	Johnny Davis	G	United States	University of Dayton
3	39	Jeff Tyson	F	United States	Western Michigan University

=== ABA Dispersal Draft ===
= All-Star
= Hall of Fame

The American Basketball Association joined the NBA with the ABA–NBA merger in 1976. Of the teams remaining in the ABA, four joined the NBA. The two teams, the Kentucky Colonels and Spirits of St. Louis, which folded had their players assigned to a dispersal draft for draft purposes.

Pick	Player	Nationality	NBA Team	ABA Team	Purchase Price
2	Maurice Lucas (PF)	United States	Portland Trail Blazers	Kentucky Colonels	$300,000
5	Moses Malone (C)	United States	Portland Trail Blazers	Spirits of St. Louis	$350,000

The Trail Blazers selected Malone in the dispersal draft after the New Orleans Jazz forfeited his rights in order to retain their first-round pick in the 1977 NBA Draft. They immediately sent Malone and US$232,000 (equivalent to $1,312,632 in 2025) cash to the Buffalo Braves for their 1978 NBA Draft first round pick, which would become the first pick in the draft by which they selected Mychal Thompson.

The Trail Blazers would also acquire point guard Dave Twardzik from the defunct Virginia Squires ABA team as well following the end of the dispersal draft once they entered free agency.

== Roster ==
1976–77 Portland Trail Blazers roster
Players

Pos.	No.	Player	Height	Weight	DOB	From
SF	10	Corky Calhoun	6 ft 7 in (2.01 m)	210 lb (95 kg)	1950-11-01	Penn
G	16	Johnny Davis	6 ft 2 in (1.88 m)	170 lb (77 kg)	1955-10-21	Dayton
G	3	Herm Gilliam	6 ft 3 in (1.91 m)	190 lb (86 kg)	1946-04-05	Purdue
SF	30	Bob Gross	6 ft 6 in (1.98 m)	200 lb (91 kg)	1953-08-03	Long Beach State
G	14	Lionel Hollins	6 ft 3 in (1.91 m)	185 lb (84 kg)	1953-10-19	Arizona State
C	34	Robin Jones	6 ft 9 in (2.06 m)	225 lb (102 kg)	1954-02-02	Saint Louis
PF	20	Maurice Lucas	6 ft 9 in (2.06 m)	215 lb (98 kg)	1952-02-18	Marquette
F/C	36	Lloyd Neal	6 ft 7 in (2.01 m)	225 lb (102 kg)	1950-12-10	Tennessee State
G/F	15	Larry Steele	6 ft 5 in (1.96 m)	180 lb (82 kg)	1949-05-05	Kentucky
PG	13	Dave Twardzik	6 ft 1 in (1.85 m)	175 lb (79 kg)	1950-09-20	Old Dominion
SF	42	Wally Walker	6 ft 7 in (2.01 m)	190 lb (86 kg)	1954-07-18	Virginia
C	32	Bill Walton	6 ft 11 in (2.11 m)	210 lb (95 kg)	1952-11-05	UCLA

Coaches
Head coach
- Jack Ramsay
Assistant(s)
- Jack McKinney

Legend
- (DP) Unsigned draft pick
- (FA) Free agent
- (S) Suspended
- Injured

== Regular season ==
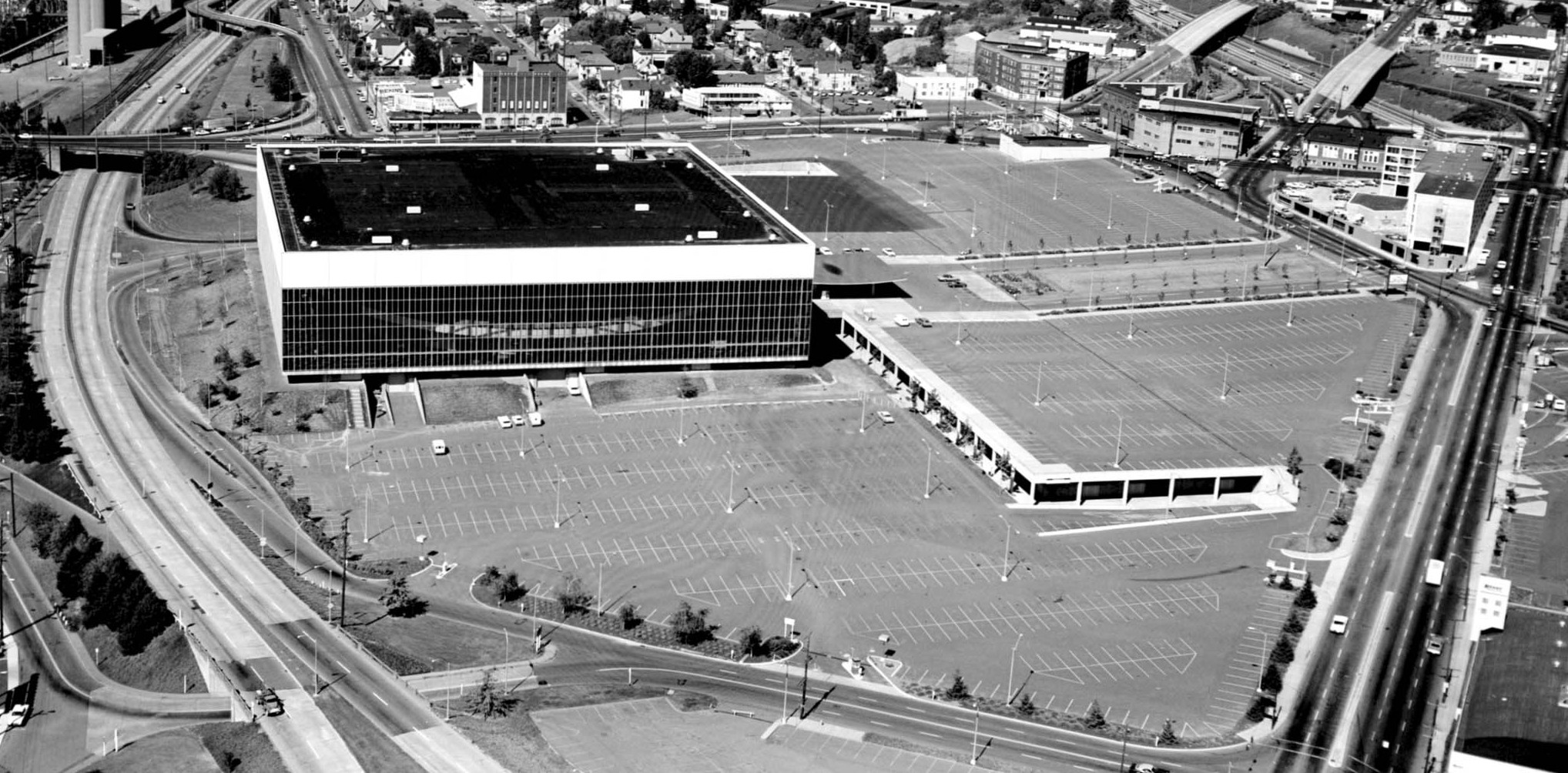
The Trail Blazers played their home games at Veterans Memorial Coliseum.

Just months earlier, the American Basketball Association had ended its ninth and last campaign and the two leagues combined. Despite the changes, it would become the season of Bill Walton and the Portland Trail Blazers. Walton's college performance led to predictions that Walton would be pro basketball's next great player. Yet those dreams went largely unfulfilled because of a series of foot injuries that hampered him. But in the 1977 playoffs, a healthy Walton and his teammates found a chemistry that enabled them to be one of the most talented pro teams ever assembled. For Walton, it wasn't a question of wanting to play but of being able to. Injuries repeatedly interrupted his progress as a pro player. On the court, when he was healthy, he was a key contributor. He missed 17 games over the 1976–77 season; the Blazers lost 12 of them. With Walton in the lineup, the Blazers were 44–21, and their .677 winning percentage during those games was the best in the league. The dispersal of ABA players had been particularly beneficial to the Blazers. Maurice Lucas was simply the most dominating power forward in the game, and his arrival only boosted Walton's effectiveness in the frontcourt. Lucas led the team in scoring at 20.2 points per game and averaged better than 11 rebounds. Coming over with Lucas from the ABA was lead guard Dave Twardzik. He had four pro seasons with the Virginia Squires of the ABA and was a starter in Ramsay's system. Another key contributor was Lionel Hollins, a second-year player out of Arizona State who averaged nearly 15 points per game.

The Blazers set a team record on November 2, 1976, when they scored 45 points in the first quarter against the Atlanta Hawks in their 129–116 win.

=== Season standings ===
Pacific Division	W	L	PCT	GB	Home	Road	Div
y-Los Angeles Lakers	53	29	.646	–	37–4	16–25	11–5
x-Portland Trail Blazers	49	33	.598	4	35–6	14–27	10–6
x-Golden State Warriors	46	36	.561	7	29–12	17–24	8–8
Seattle SuperSonics	40	42	.488	13	27–14	13–28	6–10
Phoenix Suns	34	48	.415	19	26–15	8–33	5–11

#	Western Conference				
#	Team	W	L	PCT	GB
1	z-Los Angeles Lakers	53	29	.646	–
2	y-Denver Nuggets	50	32	.610	3
3	x-Portland Trail Blazers	49	33	.598	4
4	x-Golden State Warriors	46	36	.561	7
5	x-Detroit Pistons	44	38	.537	9
6	x-Chicago Bulls	44	38	.537	9
7	Kansas City Kings	40	42	.488	13
8	Seattle SuperSonics	40	42	.488	13
9	Indiana Pacers	36	46	.439	17
10	Phoenix Suns	34	48	.415	19
11	Milwaukee Bucks	30	52	.366	23

z – clinched division title
y – clinched division title
x – clinched playoff spot

=== Season schedule ===
Date	Opponent	Score	Result	Record	Streak	Scoring Leader
October 23, 1976	New York Nets	114–104	Win	1–0	Won 1	Lucas 24
October 26, 1976	Golden State Warriors	110–96	Win	2–0	Won 2	Walton 21
October 28, 1976	at Golden State Warriors	92–112	Loss	2–1	Lost 1	Walton 21
October 30, 1976	Detroit Pistons	131–97	Win	3–1	Won 1	Lucas 24
November 2, 1976	Atlanta Hawks	129–116	Win	4–1	Won 2	Walton 22
November 5, 1976	Philadelphia 76ers	146–104	Win	5–1	Won 3	Walton 26
November 7, 1976	New York Knicks	119–93	Win	6–1	Won 4	Gross 22
November 9, 1976	Kansas City Kings	119–102	Win	7–1	Won 5	Hollins 22
November 11, 1976	at Atlanta Hawks	105–107	Loss	7–2	Lost 1	Walton 28
November 13, 1976	at San Antonio Spurs	101–113	Loss	7–3	Lost 2	Walton 18
November 16, 1976	at New Orleans Jazz	98–100	Loss	7–4	Lost 3	Walton 21
November 19, 1976	Milwaukee Bucks	124–111	Win	8–4	Won 1	Walton 27
November 21, 1976	Buffalo Braves	121–98	Win	9–4	Won 2	Twardzik 19
November 24, 1976	Chicago Bulls	117–115 (OT)	Win	10–4	Won 3	Lucas 25
November 26, 1976	at Los Angeles Lakers	96–99	Loss	10–5	Lost 1	Walton 26
November 27, 1976	Washington Bullets	103–95	Win	11–5	Won 1	Lucas 30
November 28, 1976	Indiana Pacers	145–115	Win	12–5	Won 2	Lucas 25
November 30, 1976	at Milwaukee Bucks	106–115	Loss	12–6	Lost 1	Walton 26
December 1, 1976	at Indiana Pacers	101–100	Win	13–6	Won 1	Lucas 23
December 3, 1976	at Phoenix Suns	113–99	Win	14–6	Won 2	Walton 24
December 4, 1976	Milwaukee Bucks	112–108	Win	15–6	Won 3	Walton 25
December 5, 1976	Cleveland Cavaliers	93–89	Win	16–6	Won 4	Lucas 22
December 7, 1976	at New York Knicks	111–94	Win	17–6	Won 5	Lucas 22
December 8, 1976	at Boston Celtics	95–104	Loss	17–7	Lost 1	Lucas 25
December 10, 1976	at Buffalo Braves	103–102	Win	18–7	Won 1	Walton 18
December 11, 1976	at Philadelphia 76ers	107–108	Loss	18–8	Lost 1	Walton 30
December 14, 1976	Houston Rockets	104–84	Win	19–8	Won 1	Gross 22
December 17, 1976	Denver Nuggets	127–105	Win	20–8	Won 2	Walton 22
December 18, 1976	Los Angeles Lakers	111–115 (OT)	Loss	20–9	Lost 1	Walton 28
December 21, 1976	Kansas City Kings	99–94	Win	21–9	Won 1	Walton 24
December 25, 1976	Seattle SuperSonics	110–95	Win	22–9	Won 2	Walton 26
December 26, 1976	at Seattle SuperSonics	87–89	Loss	22–10	Lost 1	Walton 26
December 28, 1976	at Chicago Bulls	84–79	Win	23–10	Won 1	Walton 29
December 29, 1976	at Detroit Pistons	111–120	Loss	23–11	Lost 1	Hollins 20
December 30, 1976	at Milwaukee Bucks	107–127	Loss	23–12	Lost 2	Davis 20
January 1, 1977	Chicago Bulls	89–82	Win	24–12	Won 1	Neal 20
January 2, 1977	at Los Angeles Lakers	99–104	Loss	24–13	Lost 1	Lucas 31
January 4, 1977	Boston Celtics	128–84	Win	25–13	Won 1	Hollins 21
January 7, 1977	New Orleans Jazz	130–118	Win	26–13	Won 2	Lucas, Davis 19
January 9, 1977	San Antonio Spurs	150–113	Win	27–13	Won 3	Twardzik 22
January 11, 1977	New York Knicks	131–111	Win	28–13	Won 4	Lucas 36
January 14, 1977	at Boston Celtics	107–92	Win	29–13	Won 5	Walton, Gross 16
January 15, 1977	at Washington Bullets	107–113	Loss	29–14	Lost 1	Walton 18
January 16, 1977	at Atlanta Hawks	120–125	Loss	29–15	Lost 2	Steele 28
January 18, 1977	at New York Nets	109–94	Win	30–15	Won 1	Lucas 21
January 20, 1977	at Cleveland Cavaliers	99–91	Win	31–15	Won 2	Lucas 32
January 22, 1977	at Houston Rockets	107–110	Loss	31–16	Lost 1	Lucas 22
January 23, 1977	at San Antonio Spurs	118–123	Loss	31–17	Lost 2	Walton 28
January 26, 1977	at Denver Nuggets	107–102	Win	32–17	Won 1	Lucas 22
January 27, 1977	San Antonio Spurs	112–104	Win	33–17	Won 2	Lucas 23
January 30, 1977	Phoenix Suns	97–91	Win	34–17	Won 3	Lucas 21
February 2, 1977	at Kansas City Kings	107–119	Loss	34–18	Lost 1	Lucas 24
February 3, 1977	at Indiana Pacers	107–98	Win	35–18	Won 1	Lucas 35
February 5, 1977	Washington Bullets	104–116	Loss	35–19	Lost 1	Lucas 21
February 8, 1977	Denver Nuggets	111–119	Loss	35–20	Lost 2	Hollins 28
February 11, 1977	Atlanta Hawks	108–121	Loss	35–21	Lost 3	Lucas 41
February 15, 1977	at Cleveland Cavaliers	96–117	Loss	35–22	Lost 4	Lucas 25
February 16, 1977	at Detroit Pistons	118–125	Loss	35–23	Lost 5	Lucas 25
February 18, 1977	at Chicago Bulls	90–87	Win	36–23	Won 1	Lucas 23
February 19, 1977	at Denver Nuggets	124–133	Loss	36–24	Lost 1	Lucas 35
February 22, 1977	Boston Celtics	113–111	Win	37–24	Won 1	Hollins 43
February 25, 1977	Houston Rockets	106–123	Loss	37–25	Lost 1	Lucas 27
March 1, 1977	Philadelphia 76ers	108–107	Win	38–25	Won 1	Lucas 34
March 4, 1977	Cleveland Cavaliers	101–113	Loss	38–26	Lost 1	Gross 17
March 5, 1977	Seattle SuperSonics	134–104	Win	39–26	Won 1	Twardzik 28
March 8, 1977	at Buffalo Braves	95–102	Loss	39–27	Lost 1	Lucas 26
March 10, 1977	at New York Knicks	104–108	Loss	39–28	Lost 2	Lucas 29
March 11, 1977	at Kansas City Kings	112–114	Loss	39–29	Lost 3	Lucas, Hollins 26
March 15, 1977	New Orleans Jazz	131–104	Win	40–29	Won 1	Hollins 22
March 17, 1977	at Golden State Warriors	115–106	Win	41–29	Won 2	Steele 27
March 18, 1977	Indiana Pacers	134–110	Win	42–29	Won 3	Hollins 28
March 20, 1977	at Phoenix Suns	106–126	Loss	42–30	Lost 1	Lucas, Walton 16
March 22, 1977	at New Orleans Jazz	95–106	Loss	42–31	Lost 2	Lucas 29
March 23, 1977	at Houston Rockets	104–109	Loss	42–32	Lost 3	Walton 26
March 25, 1977	at New York Nets	131–103	Win	43–32	Won 1	Lucas 22
March 27, 1977	at Philadelphia 76ers	116–128	Loss	43–33	Lost 1	Lucas 30
March 29, 1977	Buffalo Braves	127–101	Win	44–33	Won 1	Hollins 26
April 1, 1977	Golden State Warriors	109–98	Win	45–33	Won 2	Walton 30
April 3, 1977	at Seattle SuperSonics	119–104	Win	46–33	Won 3	Walton 26
April 5, 1977	Detroit Pistons	110–105	Win	47–33	Won 4	Neal 18
April 9, 1977	Phoenix Suns	122–111	Win	48–33	Won 5	Walton, Gilliam 18
April 10, 1977	Los Angeles Lakers	145–116	Win	49–33	Won 6	Hollins 27

== Playoffs ==
1977 playoff game log
First round: 2–1 (home: 2–0; road: 0–1)

Game	Date	Team	Score	High points	High rebounds	High assists	Location Attendance	Series
1	April 12	Chicago	W 96–83	Maurice Lucas (29)	Bill Walton (9)	Bill Walton (6)	Memorial Coliseum; 12,774	1–0
2	April 15	@ Chicago	L 104–107	Bill Walton (24)	Bill Walton (17)	Bob Gross (7)	Chicago Stadium; 20,000	1–1
3	April 17	Chicago	W 106–98	Bob Gross (26)	Bill Walton (11)	Lionel Hollins (9)	Memorial Coliseum; 12,520	2–1

Conference Semi-finals: 4–2 (home: 3–0; road: 1–2)

Game	Date	Team	Score	High points	High rebounds	High assists	Location Attendance	Series
1	April 20	@ Denver	W 101–100	Maurice Lucas (23)	Maurice Lucas (13)	Bill Walton (6)	McNichols Sports Arena; 17,995	1–0
2	April 23	@ Denver	L 110–121	Maurice Lucas (29)	Bill Walton (16)	Bill Walton (10)	McNichols Sports Arena; 17,975	1–1
3	April 24	Denver	W 110–106	Bill Walton (26)	Bill Walton (13)	Walton, Twardzik (5)	Memorial Coliseum; 12,736	2–1
4	April 26	Denver	W 105–96	Bob Gross (25)	Bill Walton (11)	Bob Gross (6)	Memorial Coliseum; 12,930	3–1
5	May 1	@ Denver	L 105–114 (OT)	Lionel Hollins (19)	Walton, Gross (14)	Hollins, Gross (7)	McNichols Sports Arena; 17,517	3–2
6	May 2	Denver	W 108–92	Johnny Davis (25)	Bill Walton (12)	Bill Walton (9)	Memorial Coliseum; 12,924	4–2

Conference Finals: 4–0 (home: 2–0; road: 2–0)

Game	Date	Team	Score	High points	High rebounds	High assists	Location Attendance	Series
1	May 6	@ Los Angeles	W 121–109	Maurice Lucas (28)	Maurice Lucas (15)	three players tied (6)	The Forum; 16,975	1–0
2	May 8	@ Los Angeles	W 99–97	Lionel Hollins (31)	Bill Walton (17)	Lionel Hollins (9)	The Forum; 15,192	2–0
3	May 10	Los Angeles	W 102–97	Walton, Lucas (22)	Bill Walton (15)	Bill Walton (9)	Memorial Coliseum; 12,926	3–0
4	May 13	Los Angeles	W 105–101	Maurice Lucas (26)	Bill Walton (14)	Walton, Gross (6)	Memorial Coliseum; 12,904	4–0

NBA Finals: 4–2 (home: 3–0; road: 1–2)

Game	Date	Team	Score	High points	High rebounds	High assists	Location Attendance	Series
1	May 22	@ Philadelphia	L 101–107	Bill Walton (28)	Bill Walton (20)	Hollins, Davis (6)	Spectrum; 18,276	0–1
2	May 26	@ Philadelphia	L 89–107	Bill Walton (17)	Bill Walton (16)	Bob Gross (4)	Spectrum; 18,276	0–2
3	May 29	Philadelphia	W 129–107	Maurice Lucas (27)	Bill Walton (18)	Bill Walton (9)	Memorial Coliseum; 12,923	1–2
4	May 31	Philadelphia	W 130–98	Lionel Hollins (25)	Bill Walton (13)	Bill Walton (7)	Memorial Coliseum; 12,913	2–2
5	June 3	@ Philadelphia	W 110–104	Bob Gross (25)	Bill Walton (24)	Johnny Davis (8)	Spectrum; 18,276	3–2
6	June 5	Philadelphia	W 109–107	Hollins, Walton (20)	Bill Walton (23)	Bill Walton (7)	Memorial Coliseum; 12,951	4–2

1977 schedule

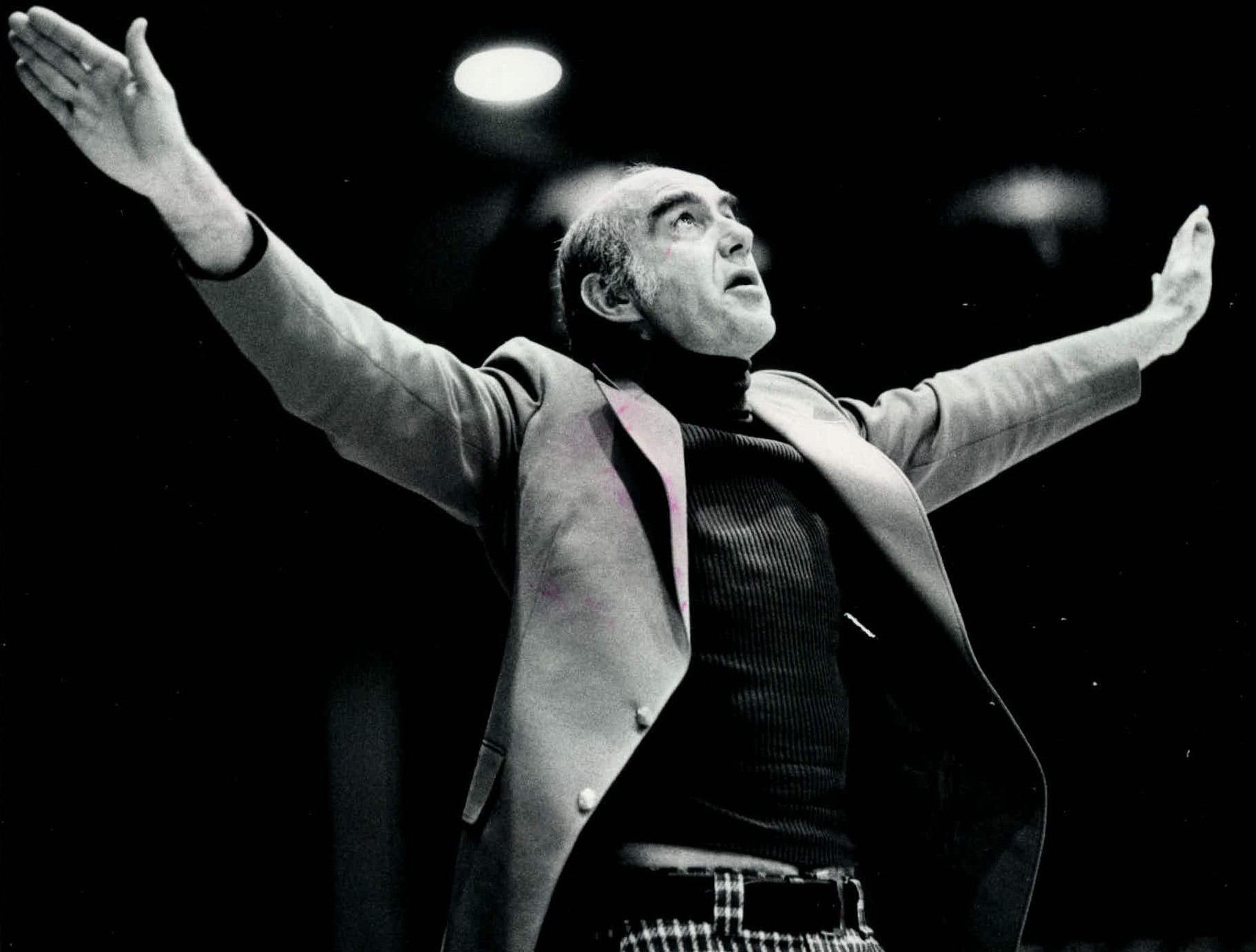
In his first season as head coach, Jack Ramsay led the Trail Blazers to their first playoff berth.

== NBA Finals ==
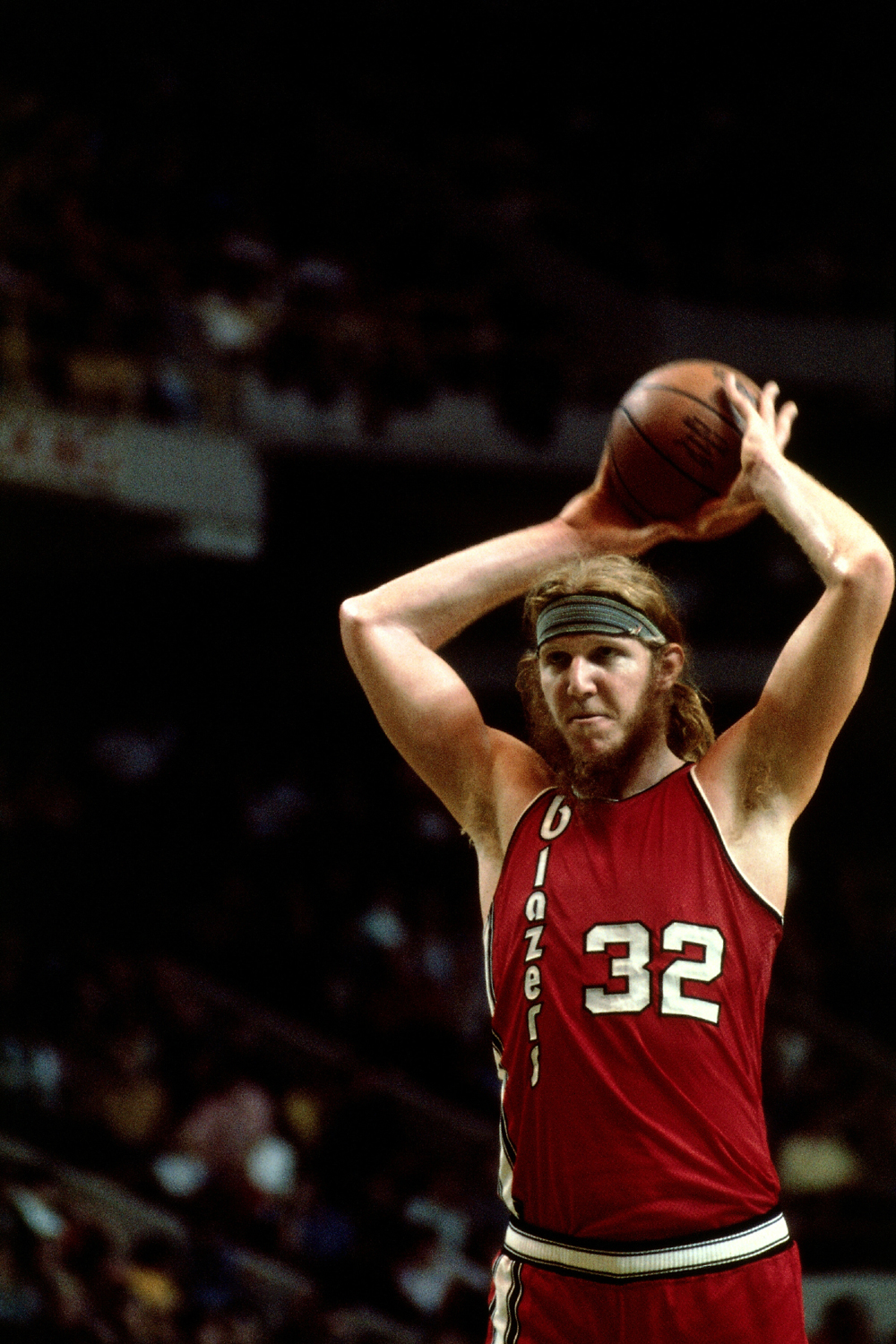
Bill Walton was the MVP for the 1977 NBA Finals.

The Finals opened in the Spectrum on Sunday, May 22. The 76ers seemed unbeatable after the first two games. Julius Erving opened Game 1 with a stupendous dunk off the opening tip. He finished with 33 points and Doug Collins had 30 as Philadelphia won 107–101. The Blazers were rattled enough to commit 34 turnovers. Walton finished with 28 points and 20 rebounds.

In Game 2 four nights later, the Sixers won handily, 107–89. Caldwell Jones and Darryl Dawkins handled Walton easily, while the Sixers dominated in the second quarter, scoring 14 points in one three-minute stretch on their way to a 61–43 halftime lead. The game became very physical with about five minutes left. First, Portland's Lloyd Neal and George McGinnis squared off, followed by Lucas and Erving trading elbows. Then, Dawkins & Gross got into some extracurricular activity battling for a rebound. Dawkins punched Gross, then Lucas punched Dawkins, resulting in a bench clearing brawl.

In Game 3, played on Sunday, May 29, Lucas strode directly to the Philadelphia bench, then startled everybody, including Dawkins, by sticking out his hand for a shake. The Blazers had a high scoring attack to win the game. Lucas contributed 27 points and 12 rebounds. Walton had nine assists, 20 points, and 18 rebounds. Twardzik, too, had returned to speed, driving the Portland offense along to a 42-point fourth quarter. They won 129–107, closing the series gap to 2–1.

In Game 4, Portland opened up a quick 17-point lead, then cruised to a 130–98 win despite Walton being sent to the bench with five fouls in the third. With a little more than eight minutes left in Game 5, Portland led 91–69 and the crowd was headed home. Erving rallied the Sixers to make it respectable at the end, 110–104. He had managed 37 points in the game. Gross scored 25 points to lead the Blazers, while Lucas had 20 with 13 rebounds. Walton finished with 24 rebounds and 14 points.

In the sixth and deciding game, Portland was up by 12 with half of the fourth quarter left when Erving led his teammates on one final run. At the four-minute mark, the lead was cut to four, 102–98. McGinnis hit a jumper, and the lead was only two points with 18 seconds left. The Sixers needed a turnover, and they finally got it from McGinnis, who was able to force a jump ball with Gross. With eight seconds remaining, Erving put up a jumper in the lane but missed. Free got the ball and lofted a baseline shot and missed too. With a second left, McGinnis tried to force a seventh and deciding game but he missed. Walton, (who had 20 points, 23 rebounds, eight blocks and seven assists) knocked the loose ball away, then when time ran out, ripped off his jersey & hurled it into the crowd.

== Player statistics ==
Legend
GP	Games played	GS	Games started	MPG	Minutes per game
FG%	Field-goal percentage	3P%	3-point field-goal percentage	FT%	Free-throw percentage
RPG	Rebounds per game	APG	Assists per game	SPG	Steals per game
BPG	Blocks per game	PPG	Points per game

=== Season ===
Player	GP	GS	MPG	FG%	3FG%	FT%	RPG	APG	SPG	BPG	PPG

=== Playoffs ===
Player	GP	GS	MPG	FG%	3FG%	FT%	RPG	APG	SPG	BPG	PPG

== Awards and records ==
- Bill Walton, All-NBA Second Team
- Bill Walton, NBA Finals Most Valuable Player Award
