= 1976–77 Milwaukee Bucks season =

NBA professional basketball team season

- Head coach: Larry Costello; Don Nelson
- Arena: MECCA Arena

Results
- Record: 30–52 (.366)
- Place: Division: 6th (Midwest); Conference: 11th (Western)
- Playoff finish: Did not qualify
- Stats at Basketball Reference

Local media
- Television: WVTV
- Radio: WTMJ

The 1976–77 Milwaukee Bucks season was the Bucks' ninth season in the NBA. It was also the first without Jon McGlocklin, the last remaining member of the Bucks' roster from the team's inaugural season.

== Draft picks ==
Round	Pick	Player	Position	Nationality	College
1	7	Quinn Buckner	SG	United States	Indiana
2	23	Alex English	SF	United States	South Carolina
2	24	Scott Lloyd	C/PF	United States	Arizona State
3	40	Lloyd Walton	PG	United States	Marquette
4	59	Dan Frost		United States	Iowa
5	75	Tom Lockhart		United States	Manhattan
5	77	James Rappis		United States	Arizona
6	92	Phil Spence	F	United States	North Carolina State
7	112	Ron Barrow		United States	Southern
8	129	Bob Warner		United States	Maine
9	146	Benny Shaw		United States	Central Florida
10	165	Hugo Cabrera		Dominican Republic	East Texas State

== Roster ==
1976–77 Milwaukee Bucks roster
Players

Pos.	No.	Player	Height	Weight	DOB	From
G	2	Junior Bridgeman	6 ft 5 in (1.96 m)	210 lb (95 kg)	1953–09–17	Louisville
PG	21	Quinn Buckner	6 ft 3 in (1.91 m)	190 lb (86 kg)	1954–08–20	Indiana
G	3	Fred Carter	6 ft 3 in (1.91 m)	185 lb (84 kg)	1945–02–14	Mount St. Mary's
SF	10	Bob Dandridge	6 ft 6 in (1.98 m)	195 lb (88 kg)	1947–11–15	Norfolk State
F	23	Alex English	6 ft 7 in (2.01 m)	190 lb (86 kg)	1954–01–05	South Carolina
SF	24	Rowland Garrett	6 ft 6 in (1.98 m)	210 lb (95 kg)	1950–07–16	Florida State
C	45	Scott Lloyd	6 ft 10 in (2.08 m)	230 lb (104 kg)	1952–12–19	Arizona State
F	22	Dave Meyers	6 ft 8 in (2.03 m)	215 lb (98 kg)	1953–04–21	UCLA
C	31	Swen Nater	6 ft 11 in (2.11 m)	240 lb (109 kg)	1950–01–14	UCLA
F	18	Kevin Restani	6 ft 9 in (2.06 m)	225 lb (102 kg)	1951–12–23	San Francisco
PG	11	Lloyd Walton	6 ft 0 in (1.83 m)	160 lb (73 kg)	1953–11–23	Marquette
G	32	Brian Winters	6 ft 4 in (1.93 m)	185 lb (84 kg)	1952–03–01	South Carolina

Coaches
Head coach
- Don Nelson
Assistant(s)
- K. C. Jones

Legend
- (DP) Unsigned draft pick
- (FA) Free agent
- (S) Suspended
- Injured

== Regular season ==
The Milwaukee Bucks rebuild in the wake of the trade of Kareem Abdul Jabbar to the Lakers following the 1974-75 NBA season hit bottom in 1976. Head Coach Larry Costello resigned following a 3–15 start. Assistant Coach Don Nelson took over the team but the Bucks slide continued as they eventually fell to 4-25. The Bucks turned things around as the young nucleus began to gel and the Bucks went 26-27 the rest of the way.

=== Season standings ===
Midwest Division	W	L	PCT	GB	Home	Road	Div
y-Denver Nuggets	50	32	.610	–	36–5	14–27	15–5
x-Detroit Pistons	44	38	.537	6	30–11	14–27	12–8
x-Chicago Bulls	44	38	.537	6	31–10	13–28	10–10
Kansas City Kings	40	42	.488	10	28–13	12–29	7–13
Indiana Pacers	36	46	.439	14	25–16	11–30	9–11
Milwaukee Bucks	30	52	.366	20	24–17	6–35	7–13

#	Western Conference				
#	Team	W	L	PCT	GB
1	z-Los Angeles Lakers	53	29	.646	–
2	y-Denver Nuggets	50	32	.610	3
3	x-Portland Trail Blazers	49	33	.598	4
4	x-Golden State Warriors	46	36	.561	7
5	x-Detroit Pistons	44	38	.537	9
6	x-Chicago Bulls	44	38	.537	9
7	Kansas City Kings	40	42	.488	13
8	Seattle SuperSonics	40	42	.488	13
9	Indiana Pacers	36	46	.439	17
10	Phoenix Suns	34	48	.415	19
11	Milwaukee Bucks	30	52	.366	23

z – clinched division title
y – clinched division title
x – clinched playoff spot

=== Game log ===
1976–77 game log
Total: 30–52 (Home: 24–17; Road: 6–35)
October: 1–5 (home: 1–2; road: 0–3)

Game	Date	Team	Score	High points	High rebounds	High assists	Location Attendance	Record
1	October 21	Buffalo	L 112–133				MECCA Arena	0–1
2	October 23	Boston	L 107–111 (OT)				MECCA Arena	0–2
3	October 24	@ Atlanta	L 91–115				Omni Coliseum	0–3
4	October 26	@ Chicago	L 88–90				Chicago Stadium	0–4
5	October 28	@ Denver	L 100–119				McNichols Sports Arena	0–5
6	October 30	Chicago	W 102–74				MECCA Arena	1–5

November: 3–13 (home: 3–5; road: 0–8)

Game	Date	Team	Score	High points	High rebounds	High assists	Location Attendance	Record
7	November 2	Seattle	W 125–113				MECCA Arena	2–5
8	November 3	@ Washington	L 105–117				Capital Centre	2–6
9	November 4	@ Cleveland	L 88–96				Richfield Coliseum	2–7
10	November 6	Denver	L 103–105				MECCA Arena	2–8
11	November 9	Cleveland	L 90–111				MECCA Arena	2–9
12	November 12	Houston	W 111–99				MECCA Arena	3–9
13	November 13	@ N. Y. Knicks	L 97–110				Madison Square Garden	3–10
14	November 14	Detroit	L 84–104				MECCA Arena	3–11
17	November 19	@ Portland	L 111–124				Memorial Coliseum	3–14
19	November 23	Los Angeles	L 114–117				MECCA Arena	3–16
22	November 30	Portland	W 115–106				MECCA Arena	4–18

December: 5–8 (home: 3–2; road: 2–6)

Game	Date	Team	Score	High points	High rebounds	High assists	Location Attendance	Record
24	December 2	@ Houston	L 110–137				The Summit	4–20
25	December 4	@ Portland	L 108–112				Memorial Coliseum	4–21
28	December 12	Philadelphia	L 102–107				MECCA Arena	4–24
33	December 26	@ Los Angeles	L 99–107				The Forum	7–26
35	December 30	Portland	W 127–107				MECCA Arena	9–26

January: 6–11 (home: 4–5; road: 2–6)

Game	Date	Team	Score	High points	High rebounds	High assists	Location Attendance	Record
40	January 8	Philadelphia	W 111–106				MECCA Arena	12–28
43	January 14	Houston	L 84–111				MECCA Arena	13–30

February: 6–7 (home: 5–0; road: 1–7)

Game	Date	Team	Score	High points	High rebounds	High assists	Location Attendance	Record
53	February 1	@ Los Angeles	L 115–136				The Forum	15–38
58	February 9	@ Philadelphia	L 104–107				The Spectrum	16–42
All-Star Break

March: 6–6 (home: 6–2; road: 0–4)

Game	Date	Team	Score	High points	High rebounds	High assists	Location Attendance	Record
66	March 5	@ Houston	L 106–119				The Summit	21–45
71	March 14	Los Angeles	W 110–106				MECCA Arena	24–47

April: 3–2 (home: 2–1; road: 1–1)

Game	Date	Team	Score	High points	High rebounds	High assists	Location Attendance	Record

1976–77 schedule

== Playoffs ==
After making the playoffs in 1976, the Bucks failed to qualify for the playoffs.

== Player statistics ==
Legend
GP	Games played	GS	Games started	MPG	Minutes per game
FG%	Field-goal percentage	3P%	3-point field-goal percentage	FT%	Free-throw percentage
RPG	Rebounds per game	APG	Assists per game	SPG	Steals per game
BPG	Blocks per game	PPG	Points per game

Player statistics
Player	GP	GS	MPG	FG%	3FG%	FT%	RPG	APG	SPG	BPG	PPG
Bob Dandridge	70		35.7	46.7		77.1	6.3	3.8	1.4	0.4	20.8
Brian Winters	78		34.8	49.8		84.7	3.0	4.3	1.5	0.4	19.3
Junior Bridgeman	82		29.4	44.9		86.4	5.1	2.5	1.0	0.3	14.4
Swen Nater	72		27.2	52.8		75.4	12.0	1.5	0.8	0.7	13.0
Dave Meyers	50		25.2	46.7		66.1	6.8	1.7	0.8	0.6	9.7
Gary Brokaw	41		21.7	40.1		76.6	1.6	2.7	0.5	0.6	8.9
Quinn Buckner	79		26.5	43.4		53.9	3.3	4.7	2.4	0.3	8.6
Elmore Smith	34		23.2	44.7		58.1	6.1	0.9	0.6	2.0	8.4
Fred Carter	47		18.6	41.6		75.3	2.0	2.2	0.6	0.1	8.3
Jim Price	6		18.5	51.2		77.8	2.2	2.5	1.2	0.2	8.2
Scott Lloyd	69		14.9	47.2		75.4	3.0	0.5	0.3	0.2	5.8
Kevin Restani	64		17.4	51.8		50.0	4.1	1.4	0.5	0.2	5.6
Alex English	60		10.8	47.7		76.7	2.8	0.4	0.3	0.3	5.2
Rowland Garrett	33		11.6	45.2		79.3	2.2	0.6	0.4	0.2	4.7
Lloyd Walton	53		12.8	46.8		81.5	1.0	2.7	0.8	0.0	4.3
Mickey Davis	19		8.7	42.6		92.0	1.5	1.1	0.3	0.2	4.3
Glenn McDonald	9		8.8	23.5		75.0	1.3	0.8	0.4	0.0	2.1

== Transactions ==
=== Trades ===
November 2, 1976

January 13, 1977

To Milwaukee Bucks----
- 1977 1st round pick (Tate Armstrong)
To Milwaukee Bucks----
- Rowland Garrett
To Buffalo Braves----
- Jim Price
To Cleveland Cavaliers----
- Gary Brokaw
- Elmore Smith
