= 1976–77 Kansas City Kings season =

NBA professional basketball team season

- Head coach: Phil Johnson
- Owners: Leon Karosen; Robert Margolin; H. Paul Rosenberg
- Arena: Kemper Arena; Omaha Civic Auditorium

Results
- Record: 40–42 (.488)
- Place: Division: 4th (Midwest); Conference: 7th (Western)
- Playoff finish: Did not qualify
- Stats at Basketball Reference

Local media
- Television: KBMA-TV
- Radio: KCMO

The 1976–77 Kansas City Kings season was the Kings 28th season in the NBA and their fifth season in the city of Kansas City.

== Roster ==
1976–77 Kansas City Kings roster
Players

Pos.	No.	Player	Height	Weight	DOB	From
SG	34	Mike Barr	6 ft 3 in (1.91 m)	180 lb (82 kg)	1950–10–19	Duquesne
SF	11	Bob Bigelow	6 ft 2 in (1.88 m)	215 lb (98 kg)	1953–12–26	Penn
SG	24	Ron Boone	6 ft 2 in (1.88 m)	200 lb (91 kg)	1946–09–06	Idaho State
C	25	Jim Eakins	6 ft 11 in (2.11 m)	215 lb (98 kg)	1946–05–24	BYU
SG	35	Glenn Hansen	6 ft 4 in (1.93 m)	205 lb (93 kg)	1952–04–21	LSU
SF	33	Ollie Johnson	6 ft 6 in (1.98 m)	200 lb (91 kg)	1949–05–11	Temple
C	44	Sam Lacey	6 ft 10 in (2.08 m)	235 lb (107 kg)	1948–03–28	New Mexico State
G	20	Andre McCarter	6 ft 3 in (1.91 m)	190 lb (86 kg)	1953–08–25	UCLA
F	52	Bill Robinzine	6 ft 7 in (2.01 m)	230 lb (104 kg)	1947–07–07	DePaul
PG	14	Brian Taylor	6 ft 2 in (1.88 m)	185 lb (84 kg)	1951–06–09	Princeton
PF	31	Richard Washington	6 ft 11 in (2.11 m)	220 lb (100 kg)	1955–07–15	UCLA
SF	15	Scott Wedman	6 ft 7 in (2.01 m)	215 lb (98 kg)	1952–07–29	Colorado

Coaches
Head coach
- Phil Johnson
Assistant(s)
- Dan Sparks

Legend
- (DP) Unsigned draft pick
- (FA) Free agent
- (S) Suspended
- Injured

== Regular season ==
=== Season standings ===
Midwest Division	W	L	PCT	GB	Home	Road	Div
y-Denver Nuggets	50	32	.610	–	36–5	14–27	15–5
x-Detroit Pistons	44	38	.537	6	30–11	14–27	12–8
x-Chicago Bulls	44	38	.537	6	31–10	13–28	10–10
Kansas City Kings	40	42	.488	10	28–13	12–29	7–13
Indiana Pacers	36	46	.439	14	25–16	11–30	9–11
Milwaukee Bucks	30	52	.366	20	24–17	6–35	7–13

#	Western Conference				
#	Team	W	L	PCT	GB
1	z-Los Angeles Lakers	53	29	.646	–
2	y-Denver Nuggets	50	32	.610	3
3	x-Portland Trail Blazers	49	33	.598	4
4	x-Golden State Warriors	46	36	.561	7
5	x-Detroit Pistons	44	38	.537	9
6	x-Chicago Bulls	44	38	.537	9
7	Kansas City Kings	40	42	.488	13
8	Seattle SuperSonics	40	42	.488	13
9	Indiana Pacers	36	46	.439	17
10	Phoenix Suns	34	48	.415	19
11	Milwaukee Bucks	30	52	.366	23

z – clinched division title
y – clinched division title
x – clinched playoff spot

== Awards and records ==
- Brian Taylor, NBA All-Defensive Second Team
