= 1976–77 Detroit Pistons season =

NBA team season

- Head coach: Herb Brown
- General manager: Oscar Feldman
- Owner: Bill Davidson
- Arena: Cobo Arena

Results
- Record: 44–38 (.537)
- Place: Division: 2nd (Midwest); Conference: 5th (Western)
- Playoff finish: First round (lost to Warriors 1–2)
- Stats at Basketball Reference

Local media
- Television: WKBD-TV
- Radio: WJR

The 1976–77 Detroit Pistons season was the Detroit Pistons' 29th season in the NBA and 20th season in the city of Detroit. The team played at Cobo Arena in Detroit.

The Pistons added Marvin Barnes in the 1976 ABA Dispersal Draft, and Detroit finished with a 44–38 (.537) record, 2nd place in the Midwest Division. The team was led by shooting guard Chris Ford (12.3 ppg), free agent addition, forward M.L. Carr (13.3 ppg, 7.7 rpg) and center Bob Lanier (25.3 ppg, 11.6 rpg, NBA All-Star). Detroit advanced to the 1977 NBA Playoffs, losing their first round Western Conference series to the Golden State Warriors.

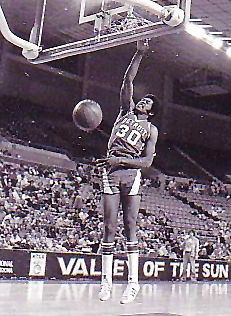
ML Carr, Pistons, 1977

The 1976–77 season was described as "absolutely insane, probably the craziest in Pistons history. They won a lot of games, but were completely dysfunctional." John Papanek of Sports Illustrated (SI) would state, "if the Pistons were a TV mini-series, they would make Roots seem like Ding Dong School." Much of the dysfunction centered around the addition of "Bad News" Barnes, who was arrested during the season at Detroit Metropolitan Airport for carrying a gun while on probation, and the addition of Herb Brown as coach, who struggled to get along with the strong personalities on the team.

The Pistons would eventually bench Barnes, who said "News didn’t come here to sit on no wood." In later years, star Detroit center Bob Lanier reflected on the dysfunctional Barnes, stating "In the ABA, Marvin Barnes was a great, great player that had issues. They took a chance on him, but Marvin was still into street life and he affected Eric Money. Money (a Detroit product, who played college ball at Arizona) could shoot the in-between jumper and he might’ve been one of the best that ever played. A few years ago I ran into Marvin in Houston and he said, ‘Bob, I used to get get high all the time and Eric started to get high with me.’ When somebody tells you that and this is 20-some odd years later, you want put your fist right through their head. And I adored Marvin Barnes – I liked his personality and he's as charming a guy as you'd ever want to meet. But in terms of him trying to be part of the team that wins a championship ... man..."

Lanier and Barnes each suffered a broken hand late in the season. Barnes did not appear in the playoffs for Detroit but Lanier was able to return. Coach Brown had also elected to start Eric Money over mercurial starter Kevin Porter down the stretch and into the post-season, and the Pistons fell to Golden State 2–1, despite winning the opening game of the series 95–90 in Oakland.

In the deciding third game, Bob Lanier put forward a double-double of 33 points and 15 rebounds, shooting 72% from the floor, only to be out-dueled by fellow Hall of Famer Rick Barry, who scored 35 points to pace the Warriors in the 109–101 victory. The game was marred by a 3rd quarter fight with Charles Dudley of Golden State tangling with Eric Money of the Pistons. The fight spilled into the stands as a Warriors fan punching Piston M.L. Carr and Lanier then decking the fan. Reflective of the different era in the game, personal fouls were called on Dudley and Money, and the game resumed.

Barnes would report to the Rhode Island Department of Corrections in Cranston, Rhode Island in the off-season to serve a 152-day sentence. He had pleaded guilty to a two-year-old charge that he had attacked Providence teammate Larry Ketvirtis with a tire iron. The judge gave him three years of probation. The October 1976 gun at the Detroit airport was a probation violation, causing the requirement to complete that initial sentence.

== Draft picks ==
Round	Pick	Player	Position	Nationality	College / Team
1	4	Leon Douglas	Center	United States	Alabama
3	38	Phil Sellers	Guard	United States	Rutgers

== Roster ==
1976–77 Detroit Pistons roster
Players

Pos.	No.	Player	Height	Weight	DOB	From
PF	24	Marvin Barnes	6 ft 8 in (2.03 m)	210 lb (95 kg)	1952-07-27	Providence
C	20	Roger Brown	6 ft 11 in (2.11 m)	225 lb (102 kg)	1950-02-23	Kansas
SF	30	M. L. Carr	6 ft 6 in (1.98 m)	205 lb (93 kg)	1951-01-09	Guilford
C	13	Leon Douglas	6 ft 10 in (2.08 m)	230 lb (104 kg)	1954-08-26	Alabama
SF	44	Al Eberhard	6 ft 6 in (1.98 m)	225 lb (102 kg)	1952-05-10	Missouri
SG	42	Chris Ford	6 ft 5 in (1.96 m)	190 lb (86 kg)	1949-01-11	Villanova
C	16	Bob Lanier	6 ft 11 in (2.11 m)	250 lb (113 kg)	1948-09-10	St. Bonaventure
PG	14	Eric Money	6 ft 0 in (1.83 m)	175 lb (79 kg)	1955-02-06	Arizona
PF	54	Howard Porter	6 ft 8 in (2.03 m)	220 lb (100 kg)	1948-08-31	Villanova
PG	1	Kevin Porter	6 ft 0 in (1.83 m)	190 lb (86 kg)	1950-04-17	Saint Francis (PA)
SG	11	Phil Sellers	6 ft 4 in (1.93 m)	195 lb (88 kg)	1953-11-20	Rutgers
PF	31	George Trapp	6 ft 8 in (2.03 m)	205 lb (93 kg)	1948-07-11	Long Beach State

Coaches
Head coach
- Herb Brown
Assistant(s)
- Larry Jones
- Mike Adbenour (trainer)

Legend
- (DP) Unsigned draft pick
- (FA) Free agent
- (S) Suspended
- Injured

Roster
Updated: November 18, 1976

== Regular season ==
=== Season standings ===
Midwest Division	W	L	PCT	GB	Home	Road	Div
y-Denver Nuggets	50	32	.610	–	36–5	14–27	15–5
x-Detroit Pistons	44	38	.537	6	30–11	14–27	12–8
x-Chicago Bulls	44	38	.537	6	31–10	13–28	10–10
Kansas City Kings	40	42	.488	10	28–13	12–29	7–13
Indiana Pacers	36	46	.439	14	25–16	11–30	9–11
Milwaukee Bucks	30	52	.366	20	24–17	6–35	7–13

#	Western Conference				
#	Team	W	L	PCT	GB
1	z-Los Angeles Lakers	53	29	.646	–
2	y-Denver Nuggets	50	32	.610	3
3	x-Portland Trail Blazers	49	33	.598	4
4	x-Golden State Warriors	46	36	.561	7
5	x-Detroit Pistons	44	38	.537	9
6	x-Chicago Bulls	44	38	.537	9
7	Kansas City Kings	40	42	.488	13
8	Seattle SuperSonics	40	42	.488	13
9	Indiana Pacers	36	46	.439	17
10	Phoenix Suns	34	48	.415	19
11	Milwaukee Bucks	30	52	.366	23

z – clinched division title
y – clinched division title
x – clinched playoff spot

== Playoffs ==
1977 playoff game log
First Round: 1–2 (home: 0–1; road: 1–1)

Game	Date	Team	Score	High points	High rebounds	High assists	Location Attendance	Series
1	April 12	@ Golden State	W 95–90	Bob Lanier (28)	Bob Lanier (17)	Kevin Porter (6)	Oakland–Alameda County Coliseum Arena; 12,459	1–0
2	April 14	Golden State	L 108–138	Eric Money (31)	Bob Lanier (18)	Eric Money (7)	Cobo Arena; 11,220	1–1
3	April 17	@ Golden State	L 101–109	Bob Lanier (33)	Bob Lanier (15)	Money, Porter (8)	Oakland–Alameda County Coliseum Arena; 13,155	1–2

1977 schedule
