= 1976–77 NBA season =

31st NBA season

- League: National Basketball Association
- Sport: Basketball
- Duration: October 21, 1976 – April 10, 1977; April 12 – May 17, 1977 (Playoffs); May 22 – June 5, 1977 (Finals)
- Games: 82
- Teams: 22
- TV partner: CBS

Draft
- Top draft pick: John Lucas
- Picked by: Houston Rockets

Regular season
- Top seed: Los Angeles Lakers
- Season MVP: Kareem Abdul-Jabbar (Los Angeles)
- Top scorer: Pete Maravich (New Orleans)

Playoffs
- Eastern champions: Philadelphia 76ers
- Eastern runners-up: Houston Rockets
- Western champions: Portland Trail Blazers
- Western runners-up: Los Angeles Lakers

Finals
- Champions: Portland Trail Blazers
- Runners-up: Philadelphia 76ers
- Finals MVP: Bill Walton (Portland)

NBA seasons
- ← 1975–76 1977–78 →

The 1976–77 NBA season was the 31st season of the National Basketball Association. The season ended with the Portland Trail Blazers winning their first NBA championship in franchise history, beating the Philadelphia 76ers in six games in the NBA Finals.

Prior to the season, the NBA merged with its primary rival league, the American Basketball Association (ABA). Four ABA teams joined the NBA, all four of which are still in the league today: the San Antonio Spurs, Indiana Pacers, Denver Nuggets, and New York Nets. The Nets became the New Jersey Nets the following season, and now play as the Brooklyn Nets. With these additions, the NBA expanded from eighteen teams to twenty-two.

== Notable occurrences ==
- The NBA's rival league, the American Basketball Association, joined with the NBA in the ABA–NBA merger. Four ABA franchises joined the NBA: the New York Nets, the Indiana Pacers, the San Antonio Spurs, and the Denver Nuggets. The other ABA teams had folded prior to the merger, except for the Kentucky Colonels and Spirits of St. Louis, both of whose players were picked up by NBA teams in the 1976 ABA dispersal draft.
- The league adopts a balanced schedule. Each team plays 19 of the 21 other clubs four times each, while playing two from the opposite conference three times each. This scheduling format remains in place for 1977-78 and 1978-79.
- The NBA Playoffs were expanded from 5 teams per conference to 6, resulting in division winners getting a first round bye.
- The 1977 NBA All-Star Game was played at The MECCA in Milwaukee, with the West beating the East 125–124. Julius Erving (one of the new arrivals from the ABA) of the Philadelphia 76ers wins the game's MVP award.
- 5 of the 10 All-Star starters and 10 of the 24 All-Star participants were former ABA players, and former ABA players filled 4 of the 10 slots on the All-NBA first and second teams. Five former ABA players competed in the NBA Finals: the Philadelphia 76ers' Julius Erving, George McGinnis and Caldwell Jones, and the Portland Trail Blazers' Maurice Lucas and Dave Twardzik.
- The Portland Trail Blazers made their first playoff appearance, winning their first and, to date, only NBA championship. They also become the second team in history (after the 1969 Celtics) to win the NBA Finals after dropping the first two games.
- This season saw the introducing of new championship trophy which would later become known as the Larry O'Brien Championship Trophy replacing the Walter A. Brown Trophy

Coaching changes
Offseason
| Team | 1975–76 NBA/ABA coach | 1976–77 NBA coach |
|---|---|---|
| Atlanta Hawks | Bumper Tormohlen | Hubie Brown |
| Buffalo Braves | Jack Ramsay | Tates Locke |
| Chicago Bulls | Dick Motta | Ed Badger |
| Houston Rockets | Johnny Egan | Tom Nissalke |
| Los Angeles Lakers | Bill Sharman | Jerry West |
| Portland Trail Blazers | Lenny Wilkens | Jack Ramsay |
| San Antonio Spurs | Bob Bass (ABA) | Doug Moe |
| Washington Bullets | K. C. Jones | Dick Motta |
In-season
| Team | Outgoing coach | Incoming coach |
| Buffalo Braves | Tates Locke; Bob MacKinnon (interim) | Bob MacKinnon (interim); Joe Mullaney (interim) |
| Milwaukee Bucks | Larry Costello | Don Nelson |
| New Orleans Jazz | Butch van Breda Kolff | Elgin Baylor |

== Final standings ==
=== By division ===
| Atlantic Division | W | L | PCT | GB | Home | Road | Div |
|---|---|---|---|---|---|---|---|
| y-Philadelphia 76ers | 50 | 32 | .610 | – | 32–9 | 18–23 | 11–5 |
| x-Boston Celtics | 44 | 38 | .537 | 6 | 28–13 | 16–25 | 9–7 |
| New York Knicks | 40 | 42 | .488 | 10 | 26–15 | 14–27 | 8–8 |
| Buffalo Braves | 30 | 52 | .366 | 20 | 23–18 | 7–34 | 6–10 |
| New York Nets | 22 | 60 | .268 | 28 | 10–31 | 12–29 | 6–10 |

| Central Division | W | L | PCT | GB | Home | Road | Div |
|---|---|---|---|---|---|---|---|
| y-Houston Rockets | 49 | 33 | .598 | – | 34–7 | 15–26 | 13–7 |
| x-Washington Bullets | 48 | 34 | .585 | 1 | 32–9 | 16–25 | 11–9 |
| x-San Antonio Spurs | 44 | 38 | .537 | 5 | 31–10 | 13–28 | 9–11 |
| x-Cleveland Cavaliers | 43 | 39 | .524 | 6 | 29–12 | 14–27 | 8–12 |
| New Orleans Jazz | 35 | 47 | .427 | 14 | 26–15 | 9–32 | 10–10 |
| Atlanta Hawks | 31 | 51 | .378 | 18 | 19–22 | 12–29 | 9–11 |

| Midwest Division | W | L | PCT | GB | Home | Road | Div |
|---|---|---|---|---|---|---|---|
| y-Denver Nuggets | 50 | 32 | .610 | – | 36–5 | 14–27 | 15–5 |
| x-Detroit Pistons | 44 | 38 | .537 | 6 | 30–11 | 14–27 | 12–8 |
| x-Chicago Bulls | 44 | 38 | .537 | 6 | 31–10 | 13–28 | 10–10 |
| Kansas City Kings | 40 | 42 | .488 | 10 | 28–13 | 12–29 | 7–13 |
| Indiana Pacers | 36 | 46 | .439 | 14 | 25–16 | 11–30 | 9–11 |
| Milwaukee Bucks | 30 | 52 | .366 | 20 | 24–17 | 6–35 | 7–13 |

| Pacific Division | W | L | PCT | GB | Home | Road | Div |
|---|---|---|---|---|---|---|---|
| y-Los Angeles Lakers | 53 | 29 | .646 | – | 37–4 | 16–25 | 11–5 |
| x-Portland Trail Blazers | 49 | 33 | .598 | 4 | 35–6 | 14–27 | 10–6 |
| x-Golden State Warriors | 46 | 36 | .561 | 7 | 29–12 | 17–24 | 8–8 |
| Seattle SuperSonics | 40 | 42 | .488 | 13 | 27–14 | 13–28 | 6–10 |
| Phoenix Suns | 34 | 48 | .415 | 19 | 26–15 | 8–33 | 5–11 |

=== By conference ===
| # | Eastern Conference | | | | |
| # | Team | W | L | PCT | GB |
|---|---|---|---|---|---|
| 1 | z-Philadelphia 76ers | 50 | 32 | .610 | – |
| 2 | y-Houston Rockets | 49 | 33 | .598 | 1 |
| 3 | x-Washington Bullets | 48 | 34 | .585 | 2 |
| 4 | x-Boston Celtics | 44 | 38 | .537 | 6 |
| 5 | x-San Antonio Spurs | 44 | 38 | .537 | 6 |
| 6 | x-Cleveland Cavaliers | 43 | 39 | .524 | 7 |
| 7 | New York Knicks | 40 | 42 | .488 | 10 |
| 8 | New Orleans Jazz | 35 | 47 | .427 | 15 |
| 9 | Atlanta Hawks | 31 | 51 | .378 | 19 |
| 10 | Buffalo Braves | 30 | 52 | .366 | 20 |
| 11 | New York Nets | 22 | 60 | .268 | 28 |

| # | Western Conference | | | | |
| # | Team | W | L | PCT | GB |
|---|---|---|---|---|---|
| 1 | z-Los Angeles Lakers | 53 | 29 | .646 | – |
| 2 | y-Denver Nuggets | 50 | 32 | .610 | 3 |
| 3 | x-Portland Trail Blazers | 49 | 33 | .598 | 4 |
| 4 | x-Golden State Warriors | 46 | 36 | .561 | 7 |
| 5 | x-Detroit Pistons | 44 | 38 | .537 | 9 |
| 6 | x-Chicago Bulls | 44 | 38 | .537 | 9 |
| 7 | Kansas City Kings | 40 | 42 | .488 | 13 |
| 8 | Seattle SuperSonics | 40 | 42 | .488 | 13 |
| 9 | Indiana Pacers | 36 | 46 | .439 | 17 |
| 10 | Phoenix Suns | 34 | 48 | .415 | 19 |
| 11 | Milwaukee Bucks | 30 | 52 | .366 | 23 |

Notes

- z, y – division champions
- x – clinched playoff spot

== Playoffs ==
First Round
E4 | Boston | 2
E5 | San Antonio | 0
E3 | Washington | 2
E6 | Cleveland | 1
W4 | Golden State | 2
W5 | Detroit | 1
W3 | Portland | 2
W6 | Chicago | 1

Conference Semifinals
E1 | Philadelphia* | 4
E4 | Boston | 3
Eastern Conference
E3 | Washington | 2
E2 | Houston* | 4
W1 | Los Angeles* | 4
W4 | Golden State | 3
Western Conference
W3 | Portland | 4
W2 | Denver* | 2

Conference Finals
E1 | Philadelphia* | 4
E2 | Houston* | 2
W1 | Los Angeles* | 0
W3 | Portland | 4

NBA Finals
E1 | Philadelphia* | 2
W3 | Portland | 4

- * Division winner
- Bold Series winner
- Italic Team with home-court advantage

== Statistics leaders ==
| Category | Player | Team | Stat |
|---|---|---|---|
| Points per game | Pete Maravich | New Orleans Jazz | 31.6 |
| Rebounds per game | Bill Walton | Portland Trail Blazers | 14.4 |
| Assists per game | Don Buse | Indiana Pacers | 8.5 |
| Steals per game | Don Buse | Indiana Pacers | 3.47 |
| Blocks per game | Bill Walton | Portland Trail Blazers | 3.25 |
| FG% | Kareem Abdul-Jabbar | Los Angeles Lakers | .579 |
| FT% | Ernie DiGregorio | Buffalo Braves | .945 |

== NBA awards ==
- Most Valuable Player: Kareem Abdul-Jabbar, Los Angeles Lakers
- Rookie of the Year: Adrian Dantley, Buffalo Braves
- Coach of the Year: Tom Nissalke, Houston Rockets

- All-NBA First Team:
  - F – Elvin Hayes, Washington Bullets
  - F – David Thompson, Denver Nuggets
  - C – Kareem Abdul-Jabbar, Los Angeles Lakers
  - G – Pete Maravich, New Orleans Jazz
  - G – Paul Westphal, Phoenix Suns
- All-NBA Second Team:
  - F – Julius Erving, Philadelphia 76ers
  - F – George McGinnis, Philadelphia 76ers
  - C – Bill Walton, Portland Trail Blazers
  - G – George Gervin, San Antonio Spurs
  - G – Jo Jo White, Boston Celtics

- All-NBA Rookie Team:
  - John Lucas, Houston Rockets
  - Mitch Kupchak, Washington Bullets
  - Scott May, Chicago Bulls
  - Adrian Dantley, Buffalo Braves
  - Ron Lee, Phoenix Suns

- NBA All-Defensive First Team:
  - Bobby Jones, Denver Nuggets
  - E.C. Coleman, New Orleans Jazz
  - Bill Walton, Portland Trail Blazers
  - Don Buse, Indiana Pacers
  - Norm Van Lier, Chicago Bulls
- NBA All-Defensive Second Team:
  - Jim Brewer, Cleveland Cavaliers
  - Jamaal Wilkes, Golden State Warriors
  - Kareem Abdul-Jabbar, Los Angeles Lakers
  - Brian Taylor, Kansas City Kings
  - Don Chaney, Los Angeles Lakers

== See also ==
- List of NBA regular season records
