= Gus Bailey =

American basketball player (1951–1988)

Personal information
- Born: February 18, 1951 Gibson, North Carolina, U.S.
- Died: November 28, 1988 (aged 37) New Orleans, Louisiana, U.S.
- Listed height: 6 ft 5 in (1.96 m)
- Listed weight: 185 lb (84 kg)

Career information
- High school: Burges (El Paso, Texas)
- College: UTEP (1971–1974)
- NBA draft: 1974: 2nd round, 23rd overall pick
- Drafted by: Houston Rockets
- Playing career: 1974–1979
- Position: Shooting guard / small forward
- Number: 22, 18, 20

Career history
- 1974–1976: Houston Rockets
- 1977–1978: New Orleans Jazz
- 1979: Washington Bullets

Career highlights
- First-team All-WAC (1973)

Career NBA statistics
- Points: 389 (2.6 ppg)
- Rebounds: 244 (1.7 rpg)
- Assists: 168 (1.1 apg)
- Stats at NBA.com
- Stats at Basketball Reference

Augustus Bailey (February 18, 1951 – November 28, 1988) was an American professional basketball player. He played college basketball for the UTEP Miners. Bailey played for the Houston Rockets, New Orleans Jazz, and Washington Bullets in the National Basketball Association (NBA).

Born in Gibson, North Carolina, Bailey played collegiately for the University of Texas at El Paso.

He was selected by the Houston Rockets in the second round (23rd pick overall) of the 1974 NBA draft and by the San Diego Conquistadors in the second round of the 1974 ABA Draft.

He played for the Rockets (1974–1976), New Orleans Jazz (1976–1979) and Washington Bullets (1979–1980) in the NBA for 147 games.

== Death ==
Bailey was found dead in his New Orleans apartment on November 28, 1988, with multiple stab wounds. According to police, he had gotten into a heated argument with a woman, Tammy Schexnayder, who lived with him. During the argument, she reportedly stabbed him in the chest. She was later charged with his murder. He was a sales representative with Kentwood Spring Water Inc. at the time of his death.

== Career statistics ==
Legend
GP	Games played	GS	Games started	MPG	Minutes per game
FG%	Field goal percentage	3P%	3-point field goal percentage	FT%	Free throw percentage
RPG	Rebounds per game	APG	Assists per game	SPG	Steals per game
BPG	Blocks per game	PPG	Points per game	**Bold**	Career high

=== NBA ===
==== Regular season ====
Year	Team	GP	MPG	FG%	3P%	FT%	RPG	APG	SPG	BPG	PPG
1974–75	Houston	47	**9.5**	.405		.488	**1.7**	1.3	.4	**.3**	2.6
1975–76	Houston	30	8.7	.364		.500	**1.7**	**1.4**	**.5**	**.3**	2.3
1977–78	New Orleans	**48**	9.4	.424		**.552**	**1.7**	.8	.4	**.3**	**3.2**
1978–79	New Orleans	2	4.5	.286		–	1.0	1.0	.0	.0	2.0
1979–80	Washington	20	9.0	**.457**	1.000	.385	1.4	1.3	.4	.2	1.9
Career		147	9.2	.406	1.000	.510	1.7	1.1	.4	.3	2.6

==== Playoffs ====
Year	Team	GP	MPG	FG%	FT%	RPG	APG	SPG	BPG	PPG
1975	Houston	8	14.5	.500	.900	2.4	2.0	.8	.3	5.6
