= 1973 NCAA Men's Basketball All-Americans =

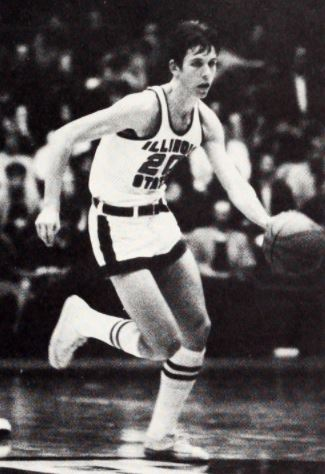
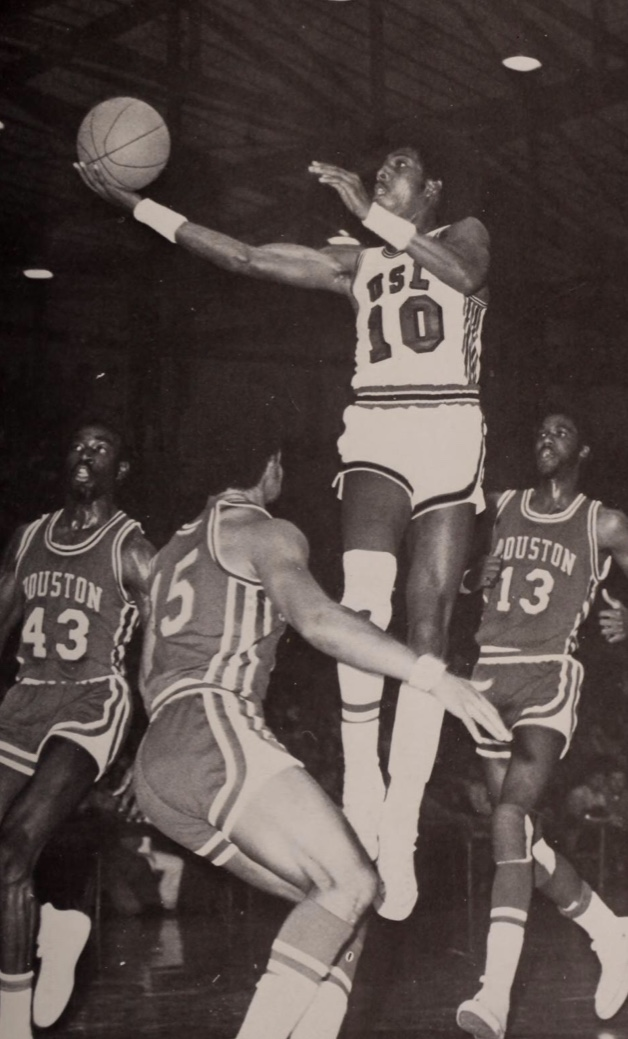
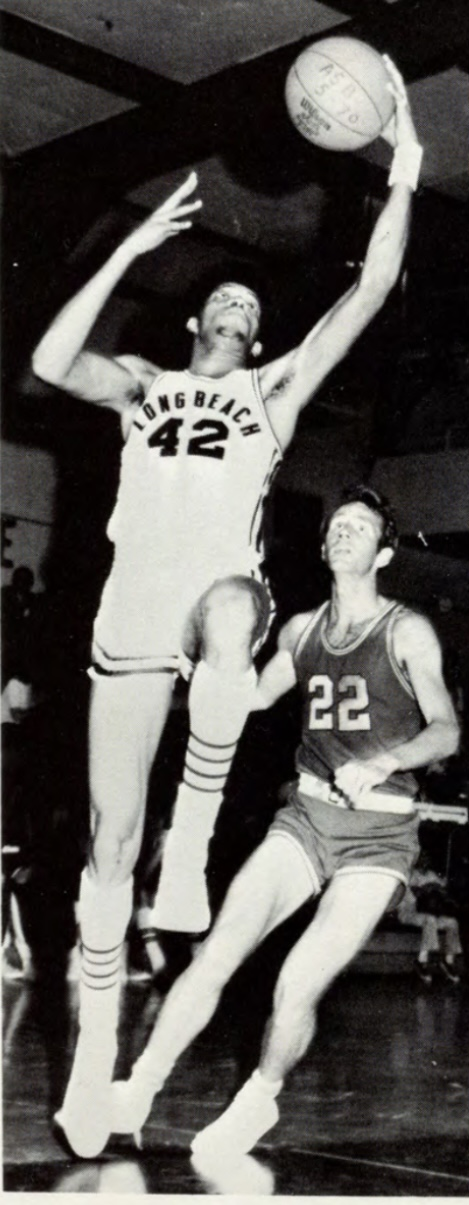
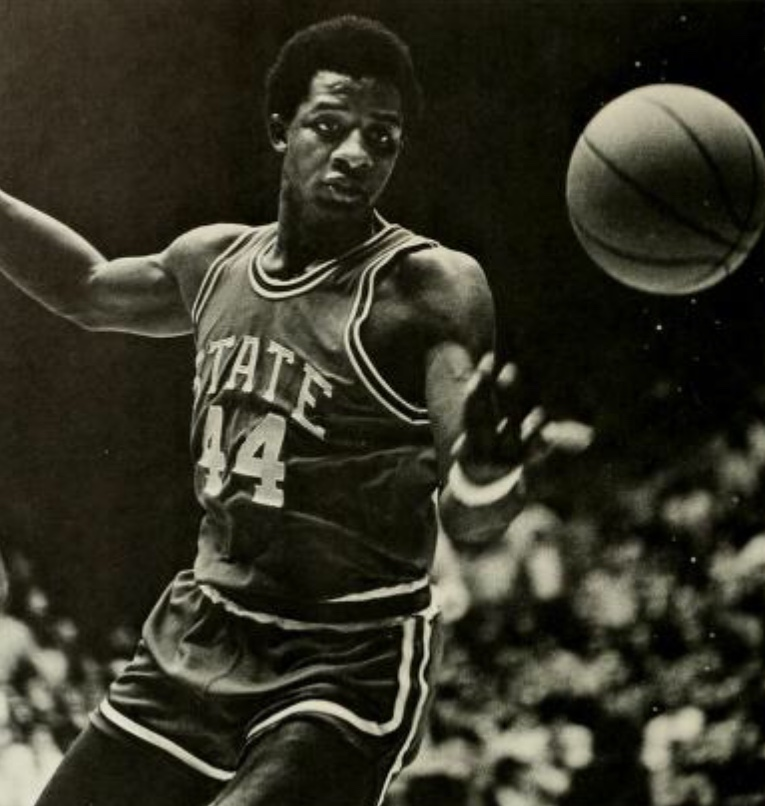
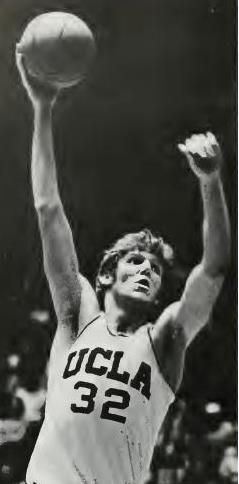
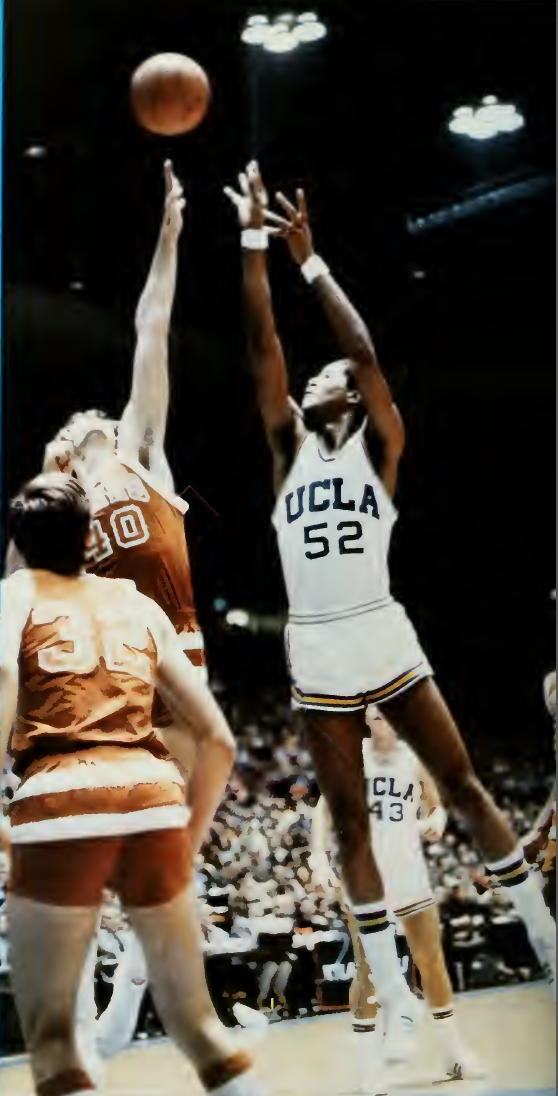
- Members of the 1973 consensus first team. Clockwise from top left: Collins, Lamar, Ratleff, Wilkes, Walton, Thompson (not pictured: DiGregorio).
- Awarded for: 1972–73 NCAA University Division men's basketball season

The consensus 1973 College Basketball All-American team, as determined by aggregating the results of four major All-American teams. To earn "consensus" status, a player must win honors from a majority of the following teams: the Associated Press, the USBWA, The United Press International and the National Association of Basketball Coaches.

== 1973 Consensus All-America team ==
Consensus First Team
Player	Position	Class	Team
Doug Collins	G	Senior	Illinois State
Ernie DiGregorio	G	Senior	Providence
Dwight Lamar	G	Senior	Southwestern Louisiana
Ed Ratleff	F	Senior	Long Beach State
David Thompson	G/F	Sophomore	North Carolina State
Bill Walton	C	Junior	UCLA
Keith Wilkes	G/F	Junior	UCLA

Consensus Second Team
Player	Position	Class	Team
Jim Brewer	F/C	Senior	Minnesota
Tom Burleson	C	Junior	North Carolina State
Larry Finch	G	Senior	Memphis State
Kevin Joyce	G	Senior	South Carolina
Tom McMillen	F	Junior	Maryland
Kermit Washington	C	Senior	American

== Individual All-America teams ==
All-America Team
All-America Team	First team		Second team		Third team		Fourth Team	
All-America Team	Player	School	Player	School	Player	School	Player	School
Associated Press	Ernie DiGregorio	Providence	Jim Brewer	Minnesota	Mike Bantom	Saint Joseph's	No fourth team	
Associated Press	Ed Ratleff	Long Beach State	Doug Collins	Illinois State	John Brown	Missouri	No fourth team	
Associated Press	David Thompson	NC State	Kevin Joyce	South Carolina	Rich Fuqua	Oral Roberts	No fourth team	
Associated Press	Bill Walton	UCLA	Dwight Lamar	Southwestern Louisiana	Tom McMillen	Maryland	No fourth team	
Associated Press	Kermit Washington	American	Keith Wilkes	UCLA	Billy Schaeffer	St. John's	No fourth team	
USBWA	Jim Brewer	Minnesota	Tom Burleson	NC State	No third or fourth teams			
USBWA	Doug Collins	Illinois State	Ernie DiGregorio	Providence	No third or fourth teams			
USBWA	Larry Finch	Memphis State	Dwight Lamar	Southwestern Louisiana	No third or fourth teams			
USBWA	Ed Ratleff	Long Beach State	David Thompson	NC State	No third or fourth teams			
USBWA	Bill Walton	UCLA	Keith Wilkes	UCLA	No third or fourth teams			
NABC	Doug Collins	Illinois State	Jim Brewer	Minnesota	John Brown	Missouri	Mike Bantom	St. Joseph's
NABC	Ed Ratleff	Long Beach State	Ernie DiGregorio	Providence	Tom Burleson	NC State	Marvin Barnes	Providence
NABC	David Thompson	NC State	Kevin Joyce	South Carolina	Allan Hornyak	Ohio State	Ron Behagen	Minnesota
NABC	Bill Walton	UCLA	Dwight Lamar	Southwestern Louisiana	Barry Parkhill	Virginia	Krešimir Ćosić	Brigham Young
NABC	Keith Wilkes	UCLA	Tom McMillen	Maryland	Billy Schaeffer	St. John's	Kermit Washington	American
UPI	Doug Collins	Illinois State	Jim Brewer	Minnesota	Marvin Barnes	Providence	No fourth team	
UPI	Dwight Lamar	Southwestern Louisiana	Ernie DiGregorio	Providence	Ron Behagen	Minnesota	No fourth team	
UPI	Ed Ratleff	Long Beach State	Kevin Joyce	South Carolina	Tom Burleson	NC State	No fourth team	
UPI	David Thompson	NC State	Tom McMillen	Maryland	Allan Hornyak	Ohio State	No fourth team	
UPI	Bill Walton	UCLA	Keith Wilkes	UCLA	Billy Schaeffer	St. John's	No fourth team	

AP Honorable Mention:

- Alvan Adams, Oklahoma
- Bird Averitt, Pepperdine
- Marvin Barnes, Providence
- Ron Behagen, Minnesota
- Willie Biles, Tulsa
- Tom Burleson, NC State
- Jim Bradley, Northern Illinois
- Allan Bristow, Virginia Tech
- Krešimir Ćosić, BYU
- Steve Downing, Indiana
- Dennis DuVal, Syracuse
- Roy Ebron, Southwestern Louisiana
- Ozzie Edwards, Oklahoma City
- Larry Farmer, UCLA
- Larry Finch, Memphis State
- Elton Hayes, Lamar
- Larry Hollyfield, UCLA
- Allan Hornyak, Ohio State
- Wendell Hudson, Alabama
- Tom Ingelsby, Villanova
- Dwight Jones, Houston
- George Karl, North Carolina
- Larry Kenon, Memphis State
- Tom Kozelko, Toledo
- Kevin Kunnert, Iowa
- Raymond Lewis, Los Angeles State
- Patrick McFarland, Saint Joseph's
- Allie McGuire, Marquette
- Larry McNeill, Marquette
- Barry Parkhill, Virginia
- Marvin Rich, Oklahoma City
- Mike Robinson, Michigan State
- Don Smith, Dayton
- Phil Smith, San Francisco
- Aron Stewart, Richmond
- Martin Terry, Arkansas
- David Vaughn, Oral Roberts
- Nick Weatherspoon, Illinois
- Fly Williams, Austin Peay
- John Williamson, New Mexico State
- Henry Wilmore, Michigan

== See also ==
- 1972–73 NCAA University Division men's basketball season
