= Ron Riley (basketball, born 1950) =

American basketball player

Personal information
- Born: November 11, 1950 (age 76) Los Angeles, California, U.S.
- Listed height: 6 ft 8 in (2.03 m)
- Listed weight: 195 lb (88 kg)

Career information
- High school: Jordan (Los Angeles, California)
- College: USC (1969–1972)
- NBA draft: 1972: 3rd round, 38th overall pick
- Drafted by: Kansas City-Omaha Kings
- Playing career: 1972–1980
- Position: Power forward
- Number: 23, 31

Career history
- 1972–1973: Kansas City-Omaha Kings
- 1973–1975: Houston Rockets
- 1978–1980: Porvoon Tarmo

Career highlights
- First-team All-Pac-8 (1972); Second-team All-Pac-8 (1971)
- Stats at NBA.com
- Stats at Basketball Reference

Ronald Jay Riley (born November 11, 1950) is an American former professional basketball player. He played for the Kansas City-Omaha Kings and the Houston Rockets in the National Basketball Association (NBA) from 1972 to 1975. He played college basketball for the USC Trojans. He was inducted into the Pac-10 Basketball Hall of Honor in 2007.

== Career statistics ==
Legend
| GP | Games played | GS | Games started | MPG | Minutes per game |
| FG% | Field goal percentage | 3P% | 3-point field goal percentage | FT% | Free throw percentage |
| RPG | Rebounds per game | APG | Assists per game | SPG | Steals per game |
| BPG | Blocks per game | PPG | Points per game | **Bold** | Career high |

=== NBA ===
==== Regular season ====
| Year | Team | GP | MPG | FG% | FT% | RPG | APG | SPG | BPG | PPG |
|---|---|---|---|---|---|---|---|---|---|---|
| 1972–73 | Kansas City–Omaha | 74 | **22.1** | **.431** | .681 | **6.9** | 1.0 | | | **8.4** |
| 1973–74 | Kansas City–Omaha | 12 | 14.2 | .421 | .583 | 4.7 | .7 | .3 | .2 | 5.2 |
| 1973–74 | Houston | 36 | 11.7 | .393 | .714 | 3.4 | .8 | .4 | **.6** | 3.4 |
| 1974–75 | Houston | **77** | 20.5 | .417 | **.732** | 4.9 | **1.7** | **.7** | .3 | 6.0 |
| 1975–76 | Houston | 65 | 16.1 | .411 | .679 | 4.7 | 1.2 | .5 | .3 | 4.1 |
| Career | | 264 | 18.4 | .419 | .691 | 5.2 | 1.2 | .6 | .4 | 5.8 |

==== Playoffs ====
| Year | Team | GP | MPG | FG% | FT% | RPG | APG | SPG | BPG | PPG |
|---|---|---|---|---|---|---|---|---|---|---|
| 1975 | Houston | 8 | 19.0 | .595 | .375 | 4.5 | 1.9 | 1.1 | .3 | 7.0 |
