= 1974–75 Houston Rockets season =

- Head coach: Johnny Egan
- General manager: Ray Patterson
- Owner: Irvin Kaplan
- Arena: Hofheinz Pavilion

Results
- Record: 41–41 (.500)
- Place: Division: 2nd (Central); Conference: 4th (Eastern)
- Playoff finish: East Conference semifinals (lost to Celtics 1–4)
- Stats at Basketball Reference

Local media
- Television: KHTV
- Radio: KPRC

The 1974–75 Houston Rockets season was the Rockets' 8th season in the NBA and 4th season in the city of Houston as well as their final season at the Hofheinz Pavilion before moving to The Summit a season later.

In the playoffs, the Rockets defeated the New York Knicks in five games in the First Round, before losing to the Boston Celtics in five games in the Semifinals.

== Roster ==
Houston Rockets roster
Players

Pos.	No.	Player	Height	Weight	DOB	From
F	35	Zaid Abdul-Aziz	6 ft 9 in (2.06 m)	235 lb (107 kg)		Iowa State
SG	22	Gus Bailey	6 ft 5 in (1.96 m)	185 lb (84 kg)		UTEP
C	10	Steve Hawes	6 ft 9 in (2.06 m)	220 lb (100 kg)		Washington
C	20	Kevin Kunnert	6 ft 9 in (2.06 m)	230 lb (104 kg)		Iowa
G	23	Calvin Murphy	5 ft 9 in (1.75 m)	165 lb (75 kg)		Niagara
G	14	Mike Newlin	6 ft 4 in (1.93 m)	200 lb (91 kg)		Utah
F	42	Ed Ratleff	6 ft 6 in (1.98 m)	195 lb (88 kg)		Long Beach State
F	31	Ron Riley	6 ft 8 in (2.03 m)	195 lb (88 kg)		USC
F	45	Rudy Tomjanovich	6 ft 8 in (2.03 m)	218 lb (99 kg)		Michigan
F	30	Owen Wells	6 ft 7 in (2.01 m)	200 lb (91 kg)		Detroit Mercy
G	11	Dave Wohl	6 ft 2 in (1.88 m)	185 lb (84 kg)		Penn

Coaches
Head coach
- Johnny Egan
Assistant(s)
- Larry Siegfried

Legend
- (DP) Unsigned draft pick
- (FA) Free agent
- (S) Suspended
- Injured

== Regular season ==
=== Season standings ===
Central Division	W	L	PCT	GB	Home	Road	Div
y-Washington Bullets	60	22	.732	–	36–5	24–17	22–8
x-Houston Rockets	41	41	.500	19	29–12	12–29	16–14
Cleveland Cavaliers	40	42	.488	20	29–12	11–30	17–13
Atlanta Hawks	31	51	.378	29	22–19	9–32	11–19
New Orleans Jazz	23	59	.280	37	20–21	3–38	9–21

#	Eastern Conference				
#	Team	W	L	PCT	GB
1	z-Boston Celtics	60	22	.732	–
2	y-Washington Bullets	60	22	.732	–
3	x-Buffalo Braves	49	33	.598	11
4	x-Houston Rockets	41	41	.500	19
5	x-New York Knicks	40	42	.488	20
6	Cleveland Cavaliers	40	42	.488	20
7	Philadelphia 76ers	34	48	.415	26
8	Atlanta Hawks	31	51	.378	29
9	New Orleans Jazz	23	59	.280	37

z – clinched division title
y – clinched division title
x – clinched playoff spot

=== Season schedule ===
1974–75 game log
Total: 41–41 (home: 29–12; road: 12–29)
October: 4–3 (home: 2–0; road: 2–3)

Game	Date	Team	Score	High points	High rebounds	High assists	Location Attendance	Record
1	October 18	@ Milwaukee	106–101	Rudy Tomjanovich (23)	Rudy Tomjanovich (14)	Newlin, Wohl (6)	MECCA Arena; 10,575	1–0
2	October 19	@ Atlanta	112–118	Mike Newlin (29)	Zaid Abdul-Aziz (10)	Dave Wohl (7)	Omni Coliseum; 4,427	1–1
3	October 22	@ New York	100–110	Rudy Tomjanovich (21)	Zaid Abdul-Aziz (12)	Mike Newlin (4)	Madison Square Garden; 14,555	1–2
4	October 23	@ Washington	95–99	Rudy Tomjanovich (28)	Zaid Abdul-Aziz (20)	Abdul-Aziz, Newlin (4)	Capital Centre; 5,109	1–3
5	October 25	Philadelphia	86–110	Rudy Tomjanovich (21)	Ron Riley (19)	Calvin Murphy (7)	Hofheinz Pavilion; 2,160	2–3
6	October 30	@ New Orleans	113–100	Mike Newlin (21)	Ron Riley (12)	Calvin Murphy (6)	Municipal Auditorium; 3,450	3–3
7	October 31	Washington	92–95	Dave Wohl (29)	Zaid Abdul-Aziz (19)	Mike Newlin (10)	Hofheinz Pavilion; 2,164	4–3

November: 7–7 (home: 5–3; road: 2–4)

Game	Date	Team	Score	High points	High rebounds	High assists	Location Attendance	Record
8	November 2	Kansas City–Omaha	97–120	Mike Newlin (32)	Rudy Tomjanovich (10)	Mike Newlin (12)	Hofheinz Pavilion; 3,457	5–3
9	November 5	New York	106–93	Rudy Tomjanovich (24)	Zaid Abdul-Aziz (11)	Riley, Tomjanovich (6)	Hofheinz Pavilion; 3,855	5–4
10	November 7	Milwaukee	93–103	Rudy Tomjanovich (22)	Zaid Abdul-Aziz (14)	Rudy Tomjanovich (10)	Hofheinz Pavilion; 3,184	6–4
11	November 9	Phoenix	101–96	Calvin Murphy (34)	Zaid Abdul-Aziz (10)	Calvin Murphy (10)	Hofheinz Pavilion; 2,053	6–5
12	November 12	@ Kansas City–Omaha	103–99	Mike Newlin (25)	Ron Riley (14)	Ron Riley (6)	Omaha Civic Auditorium; 3,038	7–5
13	November 14	Chicago	96–105	Rudy Tomjanovich (24)	Zaid Abdul-Aziz (14)	Dave Wohl (9)	Hofheinz Pavilion; 2,523	8–5
14	November 16	Detroit	98–118	Rudy Tomjanovich (26)	Rudy Tomjanovich (17)	Dave Wohl (10)	Hofheinz Pavilion; 2,457	9–5
15	November 19	Cleveland	85–94	Mike Newlin (24)	Zaid Abdul-Aziz (18)	Dave Wohl (7)	Hofheinz Pavilion; 2,164	10–5
16	November 22	@ Los Angeles	83–89	Mike Newlin (21)	Zaid Abdul-Aziz (15)	Riley, Tomjanovich (5)	The Forum; 10,411	10–6
17	November 24	@ Seattle	124–109	Calvin Murphy (27)	Zaid Abdul-Aziz (17)	Calvin Murphy (10)	Seattle Center Coliseum; 14,082	11–6
18	November 26	@ Golden State	124–144	Cliff Meely (21)	Zaid Abdul-Aziz (11)	Ed Ratleff (6)	Oakland-Alameda County Coliseum Arena; 6,015	11–7
19	November 27	@ Portland	97–111	Rudy Tomjanovich (31)	Kevin Kunnert (10)	Dave Wohl (8)	Memorial Coliseum; 10,359	11–8
20	November 29	Atlanta	96–91	Rudy Tomjanovich (25)	Zaid Abdul-Aziz (18)	Dave Wohl (5)	Hofheinz Pavilion; 3,273	11–9
21	November 30	@ Phoenix	100–112	Calvin Murphy (28)	Zaid Abdul-Aziz (14)	Mike Newlin (7)	Arizona Veterans Memorial Coliseum; 5,187	11–10

December: 8–5 (home: 7–1; road: 1–4)

Game	Date	Team	Score	High points	High rebounds	High assists	Location Attendance	Record
22	December 3	@ Cleveland	91–97	Zaid Abdul-Aziz (21)	Zaid Abdul-Aziz (11)	Dave Wohl (9)	Richfield Coliseum; 2,971	11–11
23	December 4	@ Detroit	69–86	Zaid Abdul-Aziz (13)	Zaid Abdul-Aziz (9)	—	Cobo Arena; 3,445	11–12
24	December 6	Boston	120–114 (OT)	Rudy Tomjanovich (41)	Zaid Abdul-Aziz (14)	Zaid Abdul-Aziz (6)	Hofheinz Pavilion; 5,268	11–13
25	December 10	Golden State	97–111	Zaid Abdul-Aziz (23)	Zaid Abdul-Aziz (12)	Dave Wohl (11)	Hofheinz Pavilion; 2,146	12–13
26	December 11	@ Philadelphia	96–103	Ed Ratleff (28)	Kunnert, Meely, Tomjanovich (12)	Dave Wohl (7)	The Spectrum; 6,041	12–14
27	December 12	@ Buffalo	113–124	Meely, Newlin (19)	Abdul-Aziz, Ratleff (9)	Dave Wohl (6)	Maple Leaf Gardens; 4,519	12–15
28	December 14	Kansas City–Omaha	84–123	Calvin Murphy (23)	Kevin Kunnert (11)	Bailey, Tomjanovich (6)	Hofheinz Pavilion; 2,026	13–15
29	December 17	New Orleans	83–109	Calvin Murphy (25)	Kevin Kunnert (12)	Murphy, Newlin (5)	Hofheinz Pavilion; 3,333	14–15
30	December 20	Washington	91–116	Rudy Tomjanovich (26)	Zaid Abdul-Aziz (12)	Bailey, Newlin, Wohl (6)	Hofheinz Pavilion; 3,875	15–15
31	December 21	@ Atlanta	101–96	Ed Ratleff (29)	Ratleff, Tomjanovich (10)	Calvin Murphy (10)	Omni Coliseum; 5,265	16–15
32	December 26	Atlanta	86–114	Calvin Murphy (21)	Steve Hawes (12)	Calvin Murphy (9)	Hofheinz Pavilion; 4,132	17–15
33	December 28	Buffalo	117–125	Calvin Murphy (45)	Hawes, Ratleff (10)	Dave Wohl (10)	Hofheinz Pavilion; 5,447	18–15
34	December 30	Los Angeles	107–120	Calvin Murphy (30)	Steve Hawes (12)	Dave Wohl (9)	Hofheinz Pavilion; 4,183	19–15

January: 5–10 (home: 3–4; road: 2–6)

Game	Date	Team	Score	High points	High rebounds	High assists	Location Attendance	Record
35	January 3	@ Cleveland	83–95	Rudy Tomjanovich (22)	Steve Hawes (12)	Calvin Murphy (6)	Richfield Coliseum; 7,015	19–16
36	January 4	@ Milwaukee	89–93	Mike Newlin (25)	Ed Ratleff (14)	Ed Ratleff (6)	MECCA Arena; 10,938	19–17
37	January 5	@ Kansas City–Omaha	115–106	Mike Newlin (37)	Steve Hawes (12)	Dave Wohl (6)	Kemper Arena; 8,138	20–17
38	January 7	@ Chicago	97–106	Rudy Tomjanovich (34)	Rudy Tomjanovich (11)	Calvin Murphy (7)	Chicago Stadium; 4,881	20–18
39	January 9	Washington	102–94	Rudy Tomjanovich (22)	Ed Ratleff (12)	Calvin Murphy (14)	Hofheinz Pavilion; 4,216	20–19
40	January 10	@ New Orleans	108–111	Rudy Tomjanovich (24)	Steve Hawes (17)	Dave Wohl (6)	Loyola Field House; 2,368	20–20
41	January 16	Seattle	127–125 (OT)	Ed Ratleff (25)	Hawes, Ratleff (7)	Dave Wohl (10)	Hofheinz Pavilion; 2,274	20–21
42	January 17	Portland	127–106	Calvin Murphy (25)	Ed Ratleff (8)	Hawes, Murphy (5)	Hofheinz Pavilion; 4,250	20–22
43	January 18	@ Boston	101–123	Calvin Murphy (18)	Ed Ratleff (8)	Calvin Murphy (5)	Hartford Civic Center; 11,283	20–23
44	January 21	Boston	113–102	Calvin Murphy (34)	Ed Ratleff (13)	Ed Ratleff (8)	Hofheinz Pavilion; 4,576	20–24
45	January 23	@ Atlanta	96–95	Calvin Murphy (30)	Ed Ratleff (12)	Mike Newlin (7)	Omni Coliseum; 2,691	21–24
46	January 24	Milwaukee	91–95	Calvin Murphy (23)	Kevin Kunnert (21)	Calvin Murphy (7)	Hofheinz Pavilion; 8,194	22–24
47	January 26	@ Washington	90–118	Calvin Murphy (17)	Steve Hawes (11)	Murphy, Newlin, Ratleff (5)	Capital Centre; 7,939	22–25
48	January 28	Los Angeles	89–104	Rudy Tomjanovich (19)	Rudy Tomjanovich (14)	Steve Hawes (8)	Hofheinz Pavilion; 2,156	23–25
49	January 30	Detroit	88–103	Rudy Tomjanovich (30)	Kevin Kunnert (13)	Mike Newlin (10)	Hofheinz Pavilion; 2,317	24–25

February: 9–6 (home: 5–2; road: 4–4)

Game	Date	Team	Score	High points	High rebounds	High assists	Location Attendance	Record
50	February 1	@ New York	95–93	Calvin Murphy (32)	Steve Hawes (10)	Mike Newlin (6)	Madison Square Garden; 18,284	25–25
51	February 2	@ Philadelphia	77–90	Rudy Tomjanovich (18)	Kevin Kunnert (12)	Murphy, Riley (4)	The Spectrum; 6,087	25–26
52	February 4	Golden State	107–105	Calvin Murphy (24)	Ron Riley (6)	Mike Newlin (8)	Hofheinz Pavilion; 3,173	25–27
53	February 5	@ New Orleans	124–97	Kevin Kunnert (24)	Kevin Kunnert (16)	Mike Newlin (6)	Loyola Field House; 3,063	26–27
54	February 7	Atlanta	97–105	Kunnert, Murphy (23)	Kevin Kunnert (18)	Mike Newlin (10)	Hofheinz Pavilion; 3,215	27–27
55	February 9	@ Portland	102–92	Rudy Tomjanovich (28)	Kevin Kunnert (10)	Calvin Murphy (8)	Memorial Coliseum; 10,511	28–27
56	February 11	@ Golden State	112–108 (OT)	Rudy Tomjanovich (29)	Kevin Kunnert (18)	Calvin Murphy (10)	Oakland-Alameda County Coliseum Arena; 5,775	29–27
57	February 12	@ Seattle	103–104	Calvin Murphy (27)	Zaid Abdul-Aziz (7)	Calvin Murphy (4)	Seattle Center Coliseum; 8,595	29–28
58	February 14	New Orleans	124–112	Calvin Murphy (23)	Rudy Tomjanovich (9)	Mike Newlin (4)	Hofheinz Pavilion; 3,342	29–29
59	February 16	@ Cleveland	95–100	Calvin Murphy (33)	Kevin Kunnert (12)	Calvin Murphy (6)	Richfield Coliseum; 9,082	29–30
60	February 18	Portland	83–107	Rudy Tomjanovich (27)	Rudy Tomjanovich (11)	Mike Newlin (10)	Hofheinz Pavilion; 4,067	30–30
61	February 21	Philadelphia	85–103	Calvin Murphy (20)	Kevin Kunnert (15)	Ed Ratleff (11)	Hofheinz Pavilion; 3,872	31–30
62	February 23	@ New Orleans	99–108	Kevin Kunnert (27)	Kevin Kunnert (14)	Calvin Murphy (8)	Loyola Field House; 6,425	31–31
63	February 25	Cleveland	87–114	Rudy Tomjanovich (39)	Rudy Tomjanovich (12)	Dave Wohl (8)	Hofheinz Pavilion; 4,723	32–31
64	February 28	Chicago	87–102	Kevin Kunnert (20)	Kevin Kunnert (18)	Dave Wohl (7)	Hofheinz Pavilion; 8,475	33–31

March: 7–9 (home: 6–2; road: 1–7)

Game	Date	Team	Score	High points	High rebounds	High assists	Location Attendance	Record
65	March 1	New Orleans	109–121	Calvin Murphy (25)	Zaid Abdul-Aziz (12)	Murphy, Ratleff (5)	Hofheinz Pavilion; 6,358	34–31
66	March 2	Phoenix	104–110	Ed Ratleff (31)	Kevin Kunnert (11)	Rudy Tomjanovich (9)	Hofheinz Pavilion; 4,827	35–31
67	March 7	Cleveland	86–93	Calvin Murphy (23)	Kevin Kunnert (14)	Dave Wohl (9)	Hofheinz Pavilion; 8,876	36–31
68	March 8	@ Phoenix	112–107	Rudy Tomjanovich (35)	Rudy Tomjanovich (11)	Mike Newlin (14)	Arizona Veterans Memorial Coliseum; 5,272	37–31
69	March 9	@ Los Angeles	95–116	Rudy Tomjanovich (24)	Kevin Kunnert (22)	Calvin Murphy (7)	The Forum; 11,261	37–32
70	March 11	Seattle	122–117 (OT)	Mike Newlin (32)	Kunnert, Tomjanovich (9)	Mike Newlin (13)	Hofheinz Pavilion; 6,153	37–33
71	March 12	@ Washington	88–117	Rudy Tomjanovich (18)	Ron Riley (8)	Dave Wohl (7)	Capital Centre; 6,059	37–34
72	March 14	New York	103–94	Calvin Murphy (21)	Kevin Kunnert (18)	Mike Newlin (9)	Hofheinz Pavilion; 9,471	37–35
73	March 16	@ Boston	94–99	Kevin Kunnert (24)	Rudy Tomjanovich (13)	Calvin Murphy (6)	Boston Garden; 15,320	37–36
74	March 18	Buffalo	115–122	Rudy Tomjanovich (34)	Kevin Kunnert (14)	Mike Newlin (10)	Hofheinz Pavilion; 8,627	38–36
75	March 21	@ Detroit	110–121	Calvin Murphy (31)	Ed Ratleff (9)	Ratleff, Wohl (6)	Cobo Arena; 9,048	38–37
76	March 22	@ Buffalo	112–117	Kevin Kunnert (27)	Kevin Kunnert (14)	Mike Newlin (5)	Buffalo Memorial Auditorium; 18,164	38–38
77	March 23	@ Cleveland	95–101	Rudy Tomjanovich (30)	Kunnert, Tomjanovich (14)	Dave Wohl (6)	Richfield Coliseum; 14,769	38–39
78	March 25	@ Chicago	94–112	Ed Ratleff (17)	Abdul-Aziz, Tomjanovich (9)	Calvin Murphy (6)	Chicago Stadium; 9,863	38–40
79	March 28	Cleveland	105–112	Calvin Murphy (28)	Kevin Kunnert (14)	Mike Newlin (8)	Hofheinz Pavilion; 10,518	39–40
80	March 29	New Orleans	105–107	Calvin Murphy (25)	Ed Ratleff (11)	Murphy, Ratleff (6)	Hofheinz Pavilion; 7,328	40–40

April: 1–1 (home: 1–0; road: 0–1)

Game	Date	Team	Score	High points	High rebounds	High assists	Location Attendance	Record
81	April 1	Atlanta	104–113	Rudy Tomjanovich (27)	Kevin Kunnert (11)	Calvin Murphy (7)	Hofheinz Pavilion; 8,257	41–40
82	April 2	@ Washington	85–112	Rudy Tomjanovich (20)	Kevin Kunnert (20)	Mike Newlin (11)	Capital Centre; 7,748	41–41

Source: www.basketball-reference.com

== Playoffs ==
1975 playoff game log
First Round: 2–1 (home: 2–0; road: 0–1)

Game	Date	Team	Score	High points	High rebounds	High assists	Location Attendance	Series
1	April 8	New York	W 99–84	Calvin Murphy (22)	Kevin Kunnert (14)	Mike Newlin (5)	Hofheinz Pavilion; 10,218	1–0
2	April 10	@ New York	L 96–106	Rudy Tomjanovich (22)	Kevin Kunnert (9)	Newlin, Ratleff (4)	Madison Square Garden; 19,694	1–1
3	April 12	New York	W 118–86	Rudy Tomjanovich (25)	Rudy Tomjanovich (10)	Murphy, Newlin (9)	Hofheinz Pavilion; 10,218	2–1

Conference semifinals: 1–4 (home: 1–1; road: 0–3)

Game	Date	Team	Score	High points	High rebounds	High assists	Location Attendance	Series
1	April 14	@ Boston	L 106–123	Rudy Tomjanovich (30)	Tomjanovich, Riley (9)	Calvin Murphy (6)	Boston Garden; 15,320	0–1
2	April 16	@ Boston	L 100–112	Calvin Murphy (30)	Kevin Kunnert (10)	Calvin Murphy (9)	Boston Garden; 13,254	0–2
3	April 19	Boston	W 117–102	Rudy Tomjanovich (28)	Rudy Tomjanovich (12)	Murphy, Hawes (7)	Hofheinz Pavilion; 10,218	1–2
4	April 22	Boston	L 117–122	Calvin Murphy (35)	Tomjanovich, Ratleff (11)	Mike Newlin (6)	Hofheinz Pavilion; 10,218	1–3
5	April 24	@ Boston	L 115–128	Tomjanovich, Murphy (27)	Ed Ratleff (6)	Ed Ratleff (6)	Boston Garden; 15,320	1–4

1975 schedule
