= Mike Newlin =

American basketball player

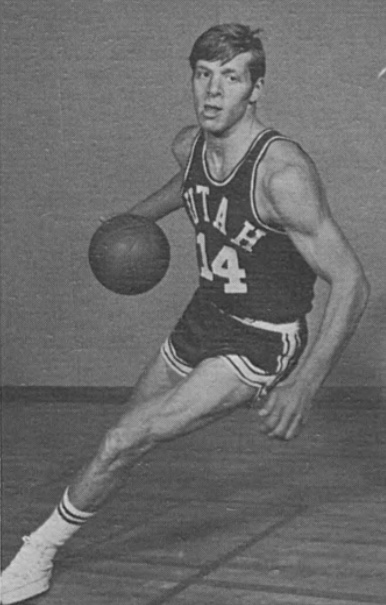
- Newlin c. 1970

Personal information
- Born: January 2, 1949 (age 77) Portland, Oregon, U.S.
- Listed height: 6 ft 4 in (1.93 m)
- Listed weight: 200 lb (91 kg)

Career information
- High school: Saint Francis (La Cañada Flintridge, California)
- College: Utah (1968–1971)
- NBA draft: 1971: 2nd round, 24th overall pick
- Drafted by: San Diego Rockets
- Playing career: 1971–1982
- Position: Shooting guard
- Number: 14

Career history
- 1971–1979: Houston Rockets
- 1979–1981: New Jersey Nets
- 1981–1982: New York Knicks

Career highlights
- 3× First-team All-WAC (1969–1971)

Career NBA statistics
- Points: 12,507 (14.9 ppg)
- Rebounds: 2,494 (3.0 rpg)
- Assists: 3,364 (4.0 apg)
- Stats at NBA.com
- Stats at Basketball Reference

Michael F. Newlin (born January 2, 1949) is an American former professional basketball player in the National Basketball Association (NBA). A 6 ft 4 in (1.93 m), 200 pounds (91 kg) shooting guard from the University of Utah, he played eleven professional seasons (from 1971 to 1982), spending most of his time with the Houston Rockets. He played in several playoff series, including the 1977 Eastern Conference Finals, which the Rockets would lose to the Philadelphia 76ers led by Julius Erving. He also played for the New Jersey Nets and New York Knicks. Michael had his finest season in 1980–81, when he averaged 21.4 points per game for the Nets, and he retired in 1982 with 12,507 career points.

== Career statistics ==
Legend
GP	Games played	GS	Games started	MPG	Minutes per game
FG%	Field goal percentage	3P%	3-point field goal percentage	FT%	Free throw percentage
RPG	Rebounds per game	APG	Assists per game	SPG	Steals per game
BPG	Blocks per game	PPG	Points per game	**Bold**	Career high
*	Led the league

=== NBA ===
==== Regular season ====
Year	Team	GP	GS	MPG	FG%	3P%	FT%	RPG	APG	SPG	BPG	PPG
1971–72	Houston	**82**	—	18.2	.414	—	.750	2.8	1.6	—	—	7.6
1972–73	Houston	**82***	—	32.4	.443	—	.886	**4.1**	5.0	—	—	17.0
1973–74	Houston	76	—	34.1	.448	—	.856	3.4	4.8	1.1	.1	18.4
1974–75	Houston	79	—	34.3	.482	—	.869	3.3	5.1	1.4	.1	14.4
1975–76	Houston	**82**	82	**37.4**	**.507**	—	.865	**4.1**	**5.6**	1.3	.1	18.6
1976–77	Houston	**82**	—	25.8	.455	—	.885	2.5	3.9	.7	.0	12.7
1977–78	Houston	45	—	26.2	.436	—	.874	2.7	4.5	1.2	**.2**	13.0
1978–79	Houston	76	—	24.1	.487	—	.872	2.2	3.8	.7	.1	10.2
1979–80	New Jersey	78	—	32.2	.460	.296	.884	3.4	4.0	**1.5**	.1	20.9
1980–81	New Jersey	79	—	36.8	.497	**.333**	**.888**	2.8	3.8	1.1	.1	**21.4**
1981–82	New York	76	32	19.8	.465	.304	.857	1.2	2.2	.4	.0	9.3
Career		837	114	29.4	.466	.302	.870	3.0	4.0	1.0	.1	14.9

==== Playoffs ====
Year	Team	GP	GS	MPG	FG%	3P%	FT%	RPG	APG	SPG	BPG	PPG
1975	Houston	8	—	**37.4**	.486	—	.897	**4.1**	**5.6**	**1.5**	.0	**16.3**
1977	Houston	**12**	—	26.3	**.524**	—	.750	2.8	4.4	1.3	.0	14.3
1979	Houston	2	—	33.5	.400	—	**1.000**	3.0	2.5	.5	**.5**	12.0
Career		22	—	31.0	.500	—	.846	3.3	4.7	1.3	.0	14.8

== See also ==
- List of National Basketball Association career free throw percentage leaders
- List of NBA single-game steals leaders
