= Ed Ratleff =

American basketball player

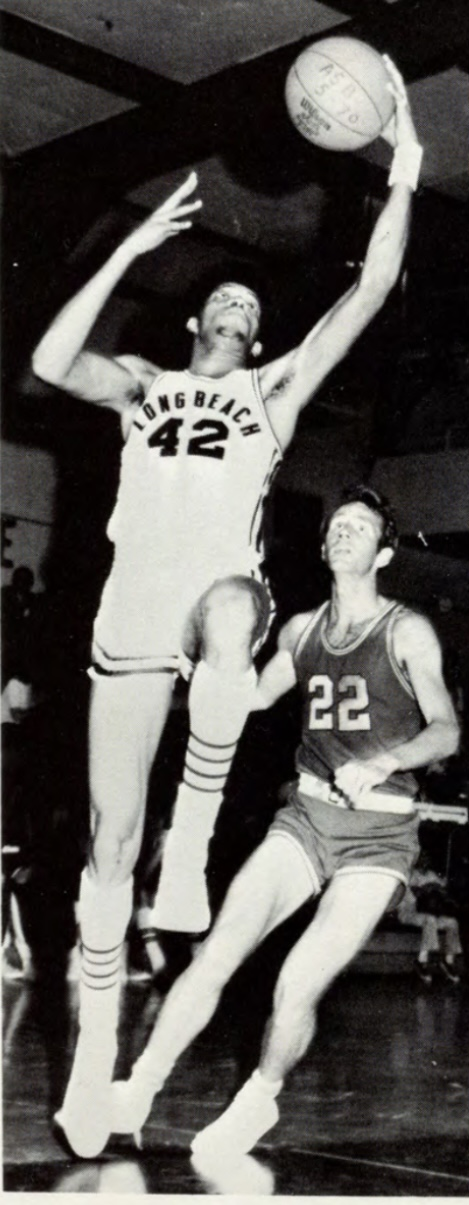
- Ratleff as a sophomore at Long Beach State

Personal information
- Born: March 29, 1950 (age 76) Bellefontaine, Ohio, U.S.
- Listed height: 6 ft 6 in (1.98 m)
- Listed weight: 195 lb (88 kg)

Career information
- High school: East (Columbus, Ohio)
- College: Long Beach State (1970–1973)
- NBA draft: 1973: 1st round, 6th overall pick
- Drafted by: Houston Rockets
- Playing career: 1973–1978
- Position: Shooting guard / small forward
- Number: 42

Career history
- 1973–1978: Houston Rockets

Career highlights
- 2× Consensus first-team All-American (1972, 1973); 2× PCAA Player of the Year (1972, 1973); 3× First-team All-PCAA (1971–1973); No. 42 retired by Long Beach State 49ers

Career NBA statistics
- Points: 2,813 (8.3 ppg)
- Rebounds: 1,363 (4.0 rpg)
- Assists: 896 (2.7 apg)
- Stats at NBA.com
- Stats at Basketball Reference
- Collegiate Basketball Hall of Fame
Medals
Men's basketball
Representing United States
Olympic Games
Silver medal – second place	1972 Munich	Team

William Edward "Easy Ed" Ratleff (born March 29, 1950) is an American former professional basketball player for the Houston Rockets of the National Basketball Association (NBA). He attended East High School (Columbus, Ohio) where he led his high school basketball team to the Ohio State Championship in 1968 and was joined by Bo Lamar to claim the 1969 Ohio High School title. Ratleff played college basketball for the Long Beach State 49ers, earning consensus first-team All-American honors twice. He was chosen for the 1972 U.S. Olympic team and participated in the Munich Games. He was selected with the sixth overall pick of the 1973 NBA draft and played five NBA seasons.

== High school ==
Ratleff attended Columbus East High School in Columbus, Ohio, leading his team to the AAA (big school) state championship in 1967–1968 with a 25–0 record. The ’68-69 Tigers were also undefeated state champions. Overall in three seasons he led the Tigers to three state championship games, two state championships and a 70-1 record.

== College career and Olympics ==
A 6'6" guard/forward, he played college basketball at California State University, Long Beach under coach Jerry Tarkanian. He still holds the school's career record for scoring average (21.4). He was twice named first-team AP All-American by the AP, in 1971–72 and 1972–73.

Ratleff played for the United States national basketball team at the 1972 Summer Olympics, where the United States lost a controversial gold medal game to the Soviet Union. Ratleff and his teammates refused to accept silver medals in protest at the refereeing controversy. Throughout the Olympic tournament, Ratleff averaged 6.4 points per game.

== Professional career ==
Ratleff was chosen with the sixth pick in the 1973 NBA draft by the Houston Rockets. He played five season for the Rockets, averaging 8.3 points and 4.0 rebounds in his NBA career.

== Personal life ==
In 1991 his number 42 was retired by Long Beach State. In 2009, he was inducted into the Ohio Basketball Hall of Fame. In 2015, he was part of the class inducted into the College Basketball Hall of Fame and in 2017 he was inducted into the Ohio High School Athletic Association Ring of Champions.

== Career statistics ==
Legend
GP	Games played	GS	Games started	MPG	Minutes per game
FG%	Field goal percentage	3P%	3-point field goal percentage	FT%	Free throw percentage
RPG	Rebounds per game	APG	Assists per game	SPG	Steals per game
BPG	Blocks per game	PPG	Points per game	**Bold**	Career high

=== NBA ===
==== Regular season ====
Year	Team	GP	MPG	FG%	FT%	RPG	APG	SPG	BPG	PPG
1973–74	Houston	**81**	21.9	.434	.798	3.5	2.2	1.1	.3	7.5
1974–75	Houston	80	32.0	.461	.826	**5.7**	3.2	**1.8**	**.6**	**11.8**
1975–76	Houston	72	**33.3**	**.485**	.816	5.3	**3.6**	1.6	.5	11.1
1976–77	Houston	37	14.4	.435	.619	2.1	1.2	.5	.2	4.5
1977–78	Houston	68	17.1	.419	**.830**	2.4	2.3	.9	.3	4.4
Career		338	24.9	.454	.803	4.0	2.7	1.3	.4	8.3

==== Playoffs ====
Year	Team	GP	MPG	FG%	FT%	RPG	APG	SPG	BPG	PPG
1975	Houston	8	36.4	.414	.850	6.6	4.4	1.8	.1	11.1
