= Kevin Kunnert =

American basketball player

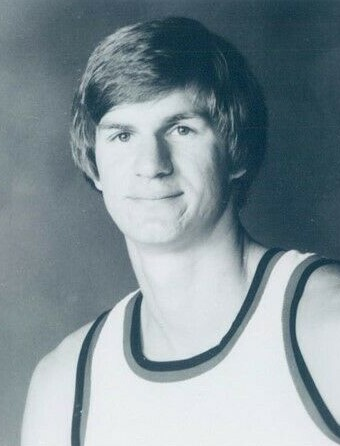

Personal information
- Born: November 11, 1951 (age 75) Dubuque, Iowa, U.S.
- Listed height: 7 ft 0 in (2.13 m)
- Listed weight: 230 lb (104 kg)

Career information
- High school: Wahlert (Dubuque, Iowa)
- College: Iowa (1970–1973)
- NBA draft: 1973: 1st round, 12th overall pick
- Drafted by: Chicago Bulls
- Playing career: 1973–1982
- Position: Center
- Number: 43, 20, 44

Career history
- 1973–1974: Buffalo Braves
- 1974–1978: Houston Rockets
- 1978–1979: San Diego Clippers
- 1979–1982: Portland Trail Blazers

Career highlights
- 2× Second-team All-Big Ten (1972, 1973)

Career NBA statistics
- Points: 4,602 (8.3 ppg)
- Rebounds: 4,031 (7.3 rpg)
- Assists: 784 (1.4 apg)
- Stats at NBA.com
- Stats at Basketball Reference

Kevin Robert Kunnert (born November 11, 1951) is an American former basketball player in the National Basketball Association (NBA). A 7'0" and 230 lb center–power forward, was drafted out of the University of Iowa by the Chicago Bulls in the first round (12th pick overall) of the 1973 NBA draft. He also helped the Houston Rockets to a Central Division title during the 1976–77 season.

== Early life ==
Kunnert was born in Dubuque, Iowa, as one of 10 children and graduated from Dubuque Wahlert High School in 1969. Kunnert led Wahlert to a third-place finish in the Iowa High School State Basketball Tournament as a senior.

== College ==
Kunnert attended the University of Iowa, where he scored 1,145 career points, and was the Hawkeyes' all-time leading rebounder at the time of his graduation. Kunnert led the Big Ten in rebounding and field goal percentage his senior year, averaging 19.2 points and 13.9 rebounds on 54.5% shooting. He averaged 18.2 points and 14.7 rebounds as a junior in 1971–1972. For his career he averaged 15.9 points and 12.7 rebounds for the Hawkeyes under Coach Dick Schultz, after being recruited to Iowa by Ralph Miller.

== NBA career ==
Kunnert was the 12th overall selection in the First Round of the 1973 NBA draft by the Chicago Bulls. He was also the 6th overall selection in the first round of the 1973 American Basketball Association draft by the Dallas Chaparrals months before they relocated to become the San Antonio Spurs. In September, 1973 Kunnert was traded by the Bulls to the Buffalo Braves with Gar Heard for John Hummer and two draft picks.

Kunnert played nine seasons in the NBA for the Buffalo Braves (1973–1974), Houston Rockets (1973–1978), San Diego Clippers (1978–1979), and the Portland Trail Blazers (1979–1982), reaching the NBA playoffs three times.

For his career he averaged 8.3 points, 7.3 rebounds and 1.1 blocks per game. His best season was with the Rockets in 1975–1976, when he averaged 12.9 points and 9.8 rebounds.

== The Washington Punch ==
An unfortunate incident occurred on December 9, 1977. Kunnert, playing for the Rockets and Kermit Washington of the Los Angeles Lakers got into a tussle after a missed shot. Kareem Abdul-Jabbar of the Lakers joined in and Kunnert went to one knee on the court in the skirmish. His teammate Rudy Tomjanovich, rushing towards the players, was punched by Washington, sending him down, where he struck his head on the court. Tomjanovich suffered a fractured skull, broken jaw, broken nose, facial injuries and leakage of spinal fluid in the incident. Washington was suspended 60 days and fined $10,000.

== Personal life ==
After retiring from the NBA, Kunnert resided in the Portland suburb of Tigard, Oregon. He has three daughters and met his wife while both were students at Iowa.

== Career statistics ==
Legend
GP	Games played	GS	Games started	MPG	Minutes per game
FG%	Field goal percentage	3P%	3-point field goal percentage	FT%	Free throw percentage
RPG	Rebounds per game	APG	Assists per game	SPG	Steals per game
BPG	Blocks per game	PPG	Points per game	**Bold**	Career high

=== NBA ===
==== Regular season ====
Year	Team	GP	GS	MPG	FG%	3P%	FT%	RPG	APG	SPG	BPG	PPG
1973–74	Buffalo	39		8.7	.485		.688	2.7	.6	.1	.6	2.8
1973–74	Houston	25		14.4	.491		.588	4.4	.7	.2	1.2	4.9
1974–75	Houston	75		24.0	**.512**		.686	8.4	1.4	.5	1.1	10.8
1975–76	Houston	80		**29.2**	.487		.654	**9.8**	**1.9**	**.7**	1.3	**12.9**
1976–77	Houston	**81**		25.3	.486		.738	8.3	**1.9**	.4	1.3	9.4
1977–78	Houston	80		26.9	.437		.689	8.7	1.2	.6	1.1	10.4
1978–79	San Diego	**81**		20.8	.467		.659	7.0	1.4	.6	**1.5**	6.5
1979–80	Portland	18		16.8	.439	–	.605	6.2	1.6	.4	1.2	7.0
1980–81	Portland	55		15.3	.468	–	**.778**	5.2	1.2	.3	.6	4.4
1981–82	Portland	21	0	11.3	.417	–	.529	3.1	.9	.1	.3	2.3
Career		555	0	21.8	.476	–	.682	7.3	1.4	.5	1.1	8.3

==== Playoffs ====
Year	Team	GP	MPG	FG%	3P%	FT%	RPG	APG	SPG	BPG	PPG
1975	Houston	8	**30.5**	.432		**.654**	7.5	**1.5**	**.5**	**1.6**	**10.9**
1977	Houston	**12**	27.3	.490		.522	**8.9**	1.2	.2	.7	9.5
1981	Portland	3	14.3	**.500**	.000	.250	3.0	.3	.3	.0	3.7
Career		23	26.7	.467	.000	.566	7.7	1.2	.3	.9	9.2

== Honors ==
Kunnert was a Two-time team Most Valuable Player for the Hawkeyes, in 1972 and 1973.

Kunnert was inducted into the Dubuque Wahlert Athletic Hall of Fame in 2018.

Kunnert was selected in the Top University of Iowa All-Time Players.
