= Steve Hawes =

American basketball player (born 1950)

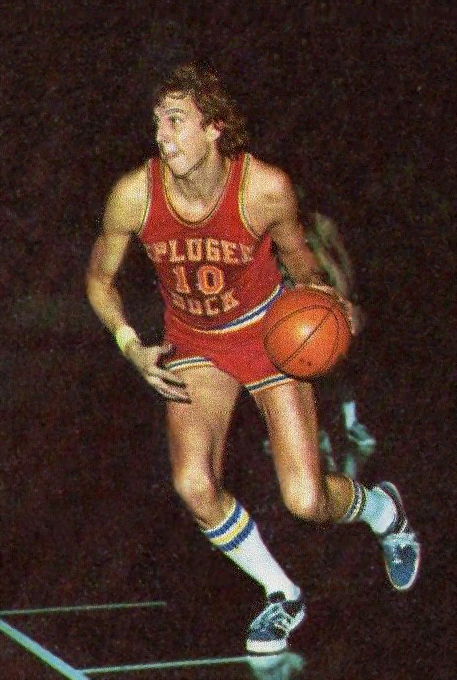
- Hawes c. 1972

Personal information
- Born: May 26, 1950 (age 76) Seattle, Washington, U.S.
- Listed height: 6 ft 9 in (2.06 m)
- Listed weight: 220 lb (100 kg)

Career information
- High school: Mercer Island (Mercer Island, Washington)
- College: Washington (1969–1972)
- NBA draft: 1972: 2nd round, 24th overall pick
- Drafted by: Cleveland Cavaliers
- Playing career: 1972–1985
- Position: Center / power forward
- Number: 10

Career history
- 1972–1974: Reyer Venezia Mestre
- 1974–1975: Houston Rockets
- 1975–1976: Portland Trail Blazers
- 1976–1983: Atlanta Hawks
- 1983–1984: Seattle SuperSonics
- 1984–1985: Reyer Giomo Venezia

Career highlights
- First-team All-Pac-8 (1972); 2× Second-team All-Pac-8 (1970, 1971)

Career NBA statistics
- Points: 5,768 (8.4 ppg)
- Rebounds: 4,272 (6.2 rpg)
- Assists: 1,288 (1.9 apg)
- Stats at NBA.com
- Stats at Basketball Reference

Steven Sherburne Hawes (born May 26, 1950) is an American former basketball player.

Hawes played high school basketball at Mercer Island High School.

A 6'9" center from the University of Washington, Hawes played ten seasons (1974–84) in the National Basketball Association as a member of the Houston Rockets, Portland Trail Blazers, Atlanta Hawks, and Seattle SuperSonics. He scored 5,768 career points and grabbed 4,272 career rebounds.

Hawes was voted on to the Washington's All-Century basketball team which was selected by a fan vote in 2002.

Hawes's nephew, Spencer Hawes, was selected by the Sacramento Kings in the 2007 NBA draft and also played 10 years in the NBA.

== Career statistics ==
Legend
GP	Games played	GS	Games started	MPG	Minutes per game
FG%	Field goal percentage	3P%	3-point field goal percentage	FT%	Free throw percentage
RPG	Rebounds per game	APG	Assists per game	SPG	Steals per game
BPG	Blocks per game	PPG	Points per game	**Bold**	Career high

=== NBA ===
==== Regular season ====
Year	Team	GP	GS	MPG	FG%	3P%	FT%	RPG	APG	SPG	BPG	PPG
1974–75	Houston	55		16.3	.502		.818	5.0	1.6	.7	.7	5.9
1975–76	Houston	6		8.5	.385		–	3.0	1.7	.0	.0	1.7
1975–76	Portland	66		20.6	.497		.725	7.3	1.6	.7	.4	7.2
1976–77	Atlanta	44		21.5	.482		.761	5.9	1.4	.8	.5	8.2
1977–78	Atlanta	75		31.0	.453		.818	**9.2**	2.5	**1.0**	**.8**	**12.7**
1978–79	Atlanta	81		27.2	.492		.818	7.3	2.3	**1.0**	.6	10.5
1979–80	Atlanta	**82**		22.6	.502	.375	**.824**	6.0	1.8	.9	.4	9.3
1980–81	Atlanta	74		**31.2**	**.523**	.250	.799	7.6	2.3	**1.0**	.4	12.0
1981–82	Atlanta	49	**42**	26.9	.481	.400	.762	6.5	**2.9**	.7	.7	9.3
1982–83	Atlanta	46	3	18.7	.373	.143	.742	5.0	1.6	.6	.2	5.0
1982–83	Seattle	31	1	17.9	.493	**.429**	.719	4.3	1.2	.3	.2	5.5
1983–84	Seattle	79	0	14.6	.481	.250	.782	2.8	1.3	.3	.2	3.7
Career		688	46	23.0	.483	.298	.790	6.2	1.9	.8	.5	8.4

==== Playoffs ====
Year	Team	GP	MPG	FG%	3P%	FT%	RPG	APG	SPG	BPG	PPG
1975	Houston	8	16.0	.474		.889	3.6	1.6	.4	.4	5.5
1978	Atlanta	2	**35.5**	.389		.667	**8.5**	**4.0**	.5	**1.0**	8.0
1979	Atlanta	**9**	27.0	.494		.750	7.0	3.2	.9	.3	9.9
1980	Atlanta	5	29.8	.439	–	.889	7.0	2.4	**1.8**	.2	**10.4**
1982	Atlanta	1	12.0	.400	–	.750	5.0	.0	.0	.0	7.0
1983	Seattle	2	17.5	**.500**	–	.667	3.0	1.0	.0	.0	6.0
1984	Seattle	5	14.8	.429	**.500**	**1.000**	4.0	1.4	.4	.0	3.0
Career		32	22.3	.464	.500	.824	5.5	2.2	.7	.3	7.3
