= Rudy Tomjanovich =

American basketball player & coach (born 1948)

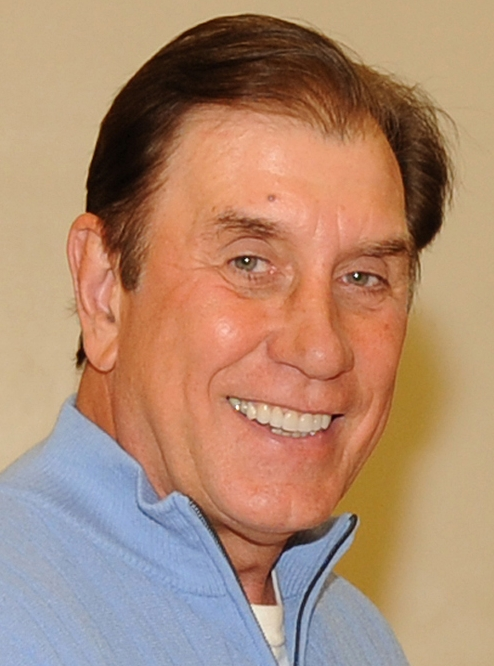
- Tomjanovich in 2009

Personal information
- Born: November 24, 1948 (age 77) Hamtramck, Michigan, U.S.
- Listed height: 6 ft 8 in (2.03 m)
- Listed weight: 218 lb (99 kg)

Career information
- High school: Hamtramck (Hamtramck, Michigan)
- College: Michigan (1967–1970)
- NBA draft: 1970: 1st round, 2nd overall pick
- Drafted by: San Diego Rockets
- Playing career: 1970–1981
- Position: Power forward
- Number: 45
- Coaching career: 1983–2005

Career history

Playing
- 1970–1981: San Diego / Houston Rockets

Career highlights
- As player: 5× NBA All-Star (1974–1977, 1979); No. 45 retired by Houston Rockets; Second-team All-American – AP, UPI (1970); Third-team All-American – NABC (1970); 2× First-team All-Big Ten (1969, 1970); No. 45 honored by Michigan Wolverines; As coach: 2× NBA champion (1994, 1995); NBA All-Star Game head coach (1997); USA Men’s Basketball | Coach | Gold Medal (2000); Chuck Daly Lifetime Achievement Award (2024)

Career playing statistics
- Points: 13,383 (17.4 ppg)
- Rebounds: 6,198 (8.1 rpg)
- Assists: 1,573 (2.0 apg)
- Stats at NBA.com
- Stats at Basketball Reference

Career coaching record
- NBA: 527–416 (.559)
- Record at Basketball Reference
- Basketball Hall of Fame
Medals
Head coach for United States
FIBA Basketball World Cup
Bronze medal – third place	1998 Athens	Head coach
Olympic Games
Gold medal – first place	2000 Sydney	Head coach

Rudolph Tomjanovich Jr. (born November 24, 1948) is an American former professional basketball player and coach. He won two NBA Championships with the Houston Rockets (1994, 1995) and coached Team USA to the gold medal in men's basketball at the 2000 Summer Olympics.

His professional playing career, which lasted between 1970 and 1981, was entirely spent with the San Diego / Houston Rockets. Tomjanovich was a 5-time NBA All-Star forward; four consecutive times between 1974 and 1977, and again in 1979. He also made the playoffs five times: in 1975, 1977, and consecutively between 1979 and 1981.

On December 9, 1977, during a game between the Rockets and the Los Angeles Lakers, Tomjanovich was the victim of a life-threatening punch to his face by Lakers power forward Kermit Washington. This ended his season after 23 games; after fully recovering, Tomjanovich played in the NBA for three more seasons.

After about eight years of being an assistant coach, Tomjanovich served as head coach of the Rockets from 1992 to 2003. As head coach, he led the Rockets to two consecutive NBA championships, in 1994 and 1995. He also coached the Los Angeles Lakers during part of the 2004–05 NBA season before resigning; he served as a consultant for the team for 14 years. Tomjanovich had only two losing seasons as a head coach. He was inducted into the Naismith Hall of Fame on May 16, 2021. In 2024, he was scheduled to be included in Croatian American Sports Hall of Fame.

== Early life ==
Rudolph Tomjanovich Jr. was born on November 24, 1948, in Hamtramck, Michigan, to Catherine (Modich) and Rudolph Tomjanovich Sr. He is of Croatian descent. He attended high school in Hamtramck and later the University of Michigan (1967–1970). He was a high school teammate of ABA player John Brisker.

== College career ==
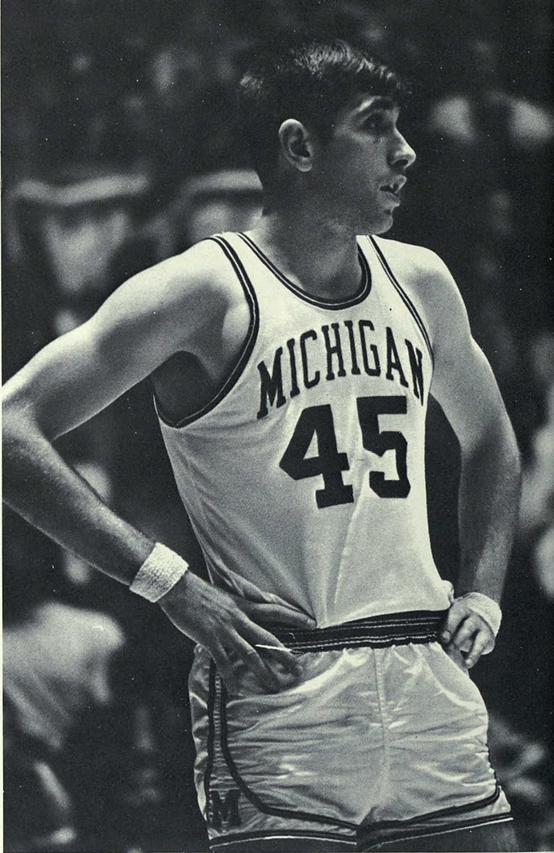
Tomjanovich from 1970 with Michigan

In college, Tomjanovich set Michigan Wolverines men's basketball career rebounding records that continue to stand. In 1968 he earned second team All-Big Ten honors, which he followed with first-team honors in 1969 and 1970. During 1970 he was also an All-American.

== Professional career ==
=== San Diego / Houston Rockets (1970–1981) ===
Tomjanovich was selected in the 1970 NBA draft as the second overall pick by the San Diego Rockets (the franchise relocated to Houston in 1971), for whom he would play the entirety of his NBA career. He was also drafted in both 1970 and 1974 by the Utah Stars of the ABA. In his eleven years in the NBA, Tomjanovich had a scoring average of 17.4 points and a rebounding average of 8.1, earning five All-Star Game selections in the process (1974–1977, 1979). He is the fourth-leading scorer in Rockets history behind James Harden and Hall of Famers Calvin Murphy and Hakeem Olajuwon. Because his last name was so long, the back of Tomjanovich's jerseys would read "RUDY T.", rather than his 11 character name.

The Rockets retired Tomjanovich's #45 jersey upon the conclusion of his playing career. His collegiate jersey, also #45, was retired by the University of Michigan in 2003.

==== Kermit Washington incident ====
During a game on December 9, 1977, Tomjanovich was punched by Kermit Washington of the Los Angeles Lakers as Tomjanovich ran to stop a fight at center court. The blow shattered Tomjanovich's face and inflicted life-threatening head and spinal injuries, leaving him sidelined for five months. He eventually made a full recovery and was selected for the NBA All-Star Game the following 1978–79 season. The incident and its aftermath are recounted in the John Feinstein book The Punch: One Night, Two Lives, and the Fight That Changed Basketball Forever, as well as in Tomjanovich's 1997 autobiography A Rocket at Heart: My Life and My Team. In 1979, a federal jury in Houston awarded Tomjanovich $3.3 million in damages.

== Coaching career ==
=== Houston Rockets (1992–2003) ===
Tomjanovich retired in 1981 and became a scout for two years before being named an assistant coach in 1983. He served as an assistant under Bill Fitch and Don Chaney.

Tomjanovich was named the Rockets' interim head coach in February 1992 after Chaney's resignation. After nearly leading the Rockets to a playoff berth, he was then given the job on a permanent basis.

In his first full season on the job (1992–93), Tomjanovich guided the Rockets to the Midwest Division title, making him the first head coach to ever take his team from the lottery to a division crown during his first full season. Building on this success, Tomjanovich led the team to back-to-back NBA championships in 1994 and 1995; additionally, the Rockets were the only team other than the Chicago Bulls to win multiple championships during the 1990s, with their titles being bookended by the Bulls' two runs of three consecutive titles each. On the playoff run to their second title, the Rockets became the lowest seed (sixth) to win one, and the only team in history to defeat the teams with the four best regular-season records in the playoffs. It was on the floor of The Summit after they captured their second title that Tomjanovich proclaimed, "Don't ever underestimate the heart of a champion!"

In his 11-plus season tenure as Rockets head coach, he posted a 503–397 (.559) regular-season record and a 51–39 (.567) playoff mark. His career wins and winning percentage are Rockets franchise records. After the 1998–99 season, the Rockets would not make the playoffs for the rest of his coaching tenure, and would consistently finish in the division cellar; Tomjanovich left the team after the 2002–03 season when he was diagnosed with bladder cancer (from which he has since made a full recovery), ending a 33-year association with the Rockets franchise—including its first 32 years in Houston—as a player, assistant coach and head coach.

=== Los Angeles Lakers (2004–2005) ===
In 2004, Tomjanovich signed a five-year, $30 million contract to replace Phil Jackson as coach of the Los Angeles Lakers. He resigned after 43 games, citing mental and physical exhaustion unrelated to his past bout with bladder cancer. The Lakers paid him a $10 million settlement, leading to speculation that the Lakers had instead terminated his contract. Tomjanovich stayed with the Lakers as a consultant.

=== Coaching style ===
Tomjanovich was well known for his instinctive managerial style and intensity on the bench. Always self-deprecating, he nonetheless heaped tremendous pressure on himself and his assistants to be prepared for each game, several times being hospitalized for exhaustion. After winning back-to-back titles, Tomjanovich deflected much of the praise and eschewed the "genius" label assigned to other champion coaches like Chuck Daly and Phil Jackson. His hands-off, easy-going manner with his players gave him a reputation as a "players coach", and as such veteran players were eager to play on his teams. Among the stars who requested and were granted trades to Houston during his tenure were Clyde Drexler, Charles Barkley, and Scottie Pippen.

=== United States national team ===
In 1998, Tomjanovich volunteered to coach the U.S. men's senior basketball team at the FIBA World Championship in Greece. Despite the absence of NBA players due to contract negotiations, Tomjanovich guided the hastily assembled group of players playing in Europe, CBA and college players to the bronze medal.

==== 2000 Summer Olympics ====
In light of his outstanding service in coaching at the 1998 Worlds and his stellar professional resume, Tomjanovich was selected to coach the U.S. men's senior team at the 2000 Summer Olympics in Sydney, Australia. The U.S. Team won the gold medal with an 8–0 record. On February 15, 2006, Tomjanovich was named director of scouting for USA Men's Basketball.

== Personal life ==
Tomjanovich has two daughters and one son with his influential ex-wife Sophie. He owns many properties, but resides in Houston, Texas, with his longtime girlfriend, Lisa Marcussen.

Tomjanovich has participated with the Texas Children's Cancer Center to help raise funds for cancer research.

He had a scholarship program with the Tomjanovich foundation, that helped put 100s of students in college.

Tomjanovich is an avid supporter for the Houston Rockets, Houston Texans, Houston Astros, University of Houston, University of Michigan, and Naismith Hall of Fame.

== Accomplishments ==
- NBA Champion head coach (1994, 1995)
- Head coach of the gold medalist USA men's basketball team at the 2000 Summer Olympics
- Head coach of the bronze medalist USA men's basketball team at the 1998 FIBA World Championship
- 5-time All-Star (1974–1977, 1979)
- NCAA All-American (1970)
- All-time University of Michigan leader in rebounds. Second on U-M all-time list in points per game
- Holds the Crisler Arena single game scoring and rebounding records
- Averaged 17.4 points per game on 50.1% shooting during his NBA career
- Michigan Sports Hall of Fame
- Houston Sports Hall of Fame
- First Basketball player from the University of Michigan to go into Naismith Hall of Fame.
- Naismith Memorial Basketball Hall of Fame

== NBA career statistics ==
Legend
GP	Games played	GS	Games started	MPG	Minutes per game
FG%	Field goal percentage	3P%	3-point field goal percentage	FT%	Free throw percentage
RPG	Rebounds per game	APG	Assists per game	SPG	Steals per game
BPG	Blocks per game	PPG	Points per game	**Bold**	Career high

=== Regular season ===
Year	Team	GP	GS	MPG	FG%	3P%	FT%	RPG	APG	SPG	BPG	PPG
1970–71	San Diego	77	...	13.8	.383	...	.652	4.9	.9	...	...	5.3
1971–72	Houston	78	...	34.5	.495	...	.723	**11.8**	1.5	...	...	15.0
1972–73	Houston	**81**	...	36.7	.478	...	.746	11.6	2.2	...	...	19.3
1973–74	Houston	80	...	**40.3**	**.536**	...	**.848**	9.0	**3.1**	**1.1**	**.8**	**24.5**
1974–75	Houston	**81**	...	38.7	.525	...	.790	7.6	2.9	.9	.3	20.7
1975–76	Houston	79	...	36.9	.517	...	.767	8.4	2.4	.5	.2	18.5
1976–77	Houston	**81**	...	38.6	.510	...	.839	8.4	2.1	.7	.3	21.6
1977–78	Houston	23	...	36.9	.485	...	.753	6.0	1.4	.7	.2	21.5
1978–79	Houston	74	...	35.7	.517	...	.760	7.7	1.9	.6	.2	19.0
1979–80	Houston	62	...	29.6	.476	**.278**	.803	5.8	1.8	.5	.2	14.2
1980–81	Houston	52	...	24.3	.467	.235	.793	4.0	1.6	.4	.1	11.6
Career		768	...	33.5	.501	.262	.784	8.1	2.0	.7	.3	17.4

=== Playoffs ===
Year	Team	GP	GS	MPG	FG%	3P%	FT%	RPG	APG	SPG	BPG	PPG
1975	Houston	8	...	38.0	**.563**	...	**.833**	**8.0**	**2.9**	.1	**.5**	**23.0**
1977	Houston	**12**	...	**38.1**	.505	...	.784	5.4	2.0	**.6**	.3	20.3
1979	Houston	2	...	32.0	.391	...	.400	7.0	1.0	.5	**.5**	10.0
1980	Houston	7	...	26.4	.375	**.143**	.692	5.7	1.4	.3	.0	8.3
1981	Houston	8	...	3.9	.111	.000	.667	.8	.0	.0	.0	.8
Career		37	...	28.1	.489	.100	.771	5.1	1.6	.3	.2	13.8

== Head coaching record ==
Legend
Regular season	G	Games coached	W	Games won	L	Games lost	W–L %	Win–loss %
Playoffs	PG	Playoff games	PW	Playoff wins	PL	Playoff losses	PW–L %	Playoff win–loss %

Team	Year	G	W	L	W–L%	Finish	PG	PW	PL	PW–L%	Result
Houston	1991–92	30	16	14	.533	3rd in Midwest	—	—	—	—	Missed Playoffs
Houston	1992–93	82	55	27	.671	1st in Midwest	12	6	6	.500	Lost in Conf. Semifinals
Houston	1993–94	82	58	24	.707	1st in Midwest	23	15	8	.652	Won NBA Championship
Houston	1994–95	82	47	35	.573	3rd in Midwest	22	15	7	.682	Won NBA Championship
Houston	1995–96	82	48	34	.585	3rd in Midwest	8	3	5	.375	Lost in Conf. Semifinals
Houston	1996–97	82	57	25	.695	2nd in Midwest	16	9	7	.563	Lost in Conf. Finals
Houston	1997–98	82	41	41	.500	4th in Midwest	5	2	3	.400	Lost in First round
Houston	1998–99	50	31	19	.620	3rd in Midwest	4	1	3	.250	Lost in First round
Houston	1999–00	82	34	48	.415	6th in Midwest	—	—	—	—	Missed Playoffs
Houston	2000–01	82	45	37	.549	5th in Midwest	—	—	—	—	Missed Playoffs
Houston	2001–02	82	28	54	.341	5th in Midwest	—	—	—	—	Missed Playoffs
Houston	2002–03	82	43	39	.524	5th in Midwest	—	—	—	—	Missed Playoffs
L.A. Lakers	2004–05	43	24	19	.558	(resigned)	—	—	—	—	—
Career		943	527	416	.559		90	51	39	.567	

== See also ==
- University of Michigan Athletic Hall of Honor
