= Calvin Murphy =

American basketball player (born 1948)

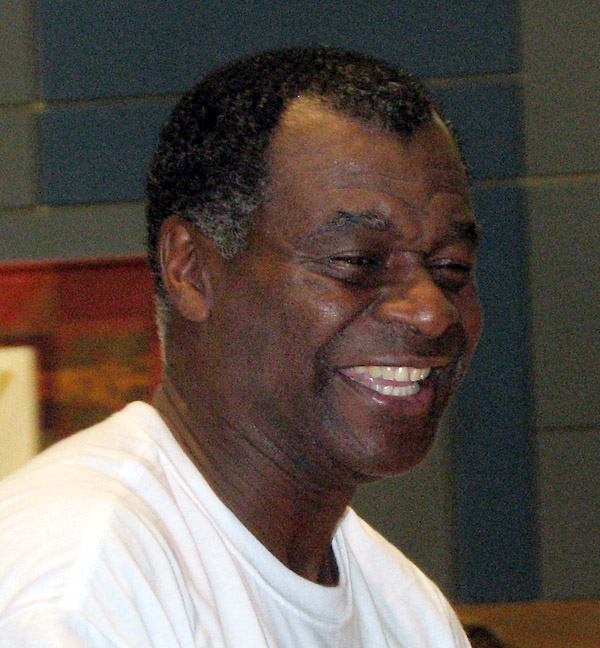
- Murphy in 2008

Personal information
- Born: May 9, 1948 (age 78) Norwalk, Connecticut, U.S.
- Listed height: 5 ft 9 in (1.75 m)
- Listed weight: 165 lb (75 kg)

Career information
- High school: Norwalk (Norwalk, Connecticut)
- College: Niagara (1967–1970)
- NBA draft: 1970: 2nd round, 18th overall pick
- Drafted by: San Diego Rockets
- Playing career: 1970–1983
- Position: Point guard
- Number: 23
- Coaching career: 1990–1993

Career history

Playing
- 1970–1983: San Diego / Houston Rockets

Career highlights
- NBA All-Star (1979); NBA All-Rookie First Team (1971); No. 23 retired by Houston Rockets; 2× Consensus first-team All-American (1969, 1970); Consensus second-team All-American (1968); No. 23 retired by Niagara Purple Eagles; Mr. Basketball USA (1966); First-team Parade All-American (1966)

Career statistics
- Points: 17,949 (17.9 ppg)
- Assists: 4,402 (4.4 apg)
- Steals: 1,165 (1.5 spg)
- Stats at NBA.com
- Stats at Basketball Reference
- Basketball Hall of Fame
- Collegiate Basketball Hall of Fame

Calvin Jerome Murphy (born May 9, 1948) is an American former professional basketball player who after a prolific collegiate career at Niagara University, where he averaged 33.1 points per game over his three years, played in the National Basketball Association as a guard for the San Diego/Houston Rockets from 1970 to 1983. He is currently a member of the Houston Rockets' Space City Home Network broadcast team. Standing at a height of 5 feet 9 inches (1.75 m), Murphy has the distinction of being the shortest NBA player inducted into the Naismith Memorial Basketball Hall of Fame, and to play in an NBA All-Star Game (the latter since tied by Isaiah Thomas in 2016).

== Early years ==
Before basketball, Calvin Murphy was a world-class baton twirler. He says he was "bullied into it" as his mother and all six of her sisters were twirlers. As an 8th grader, in 1963, he won a national championship in baton twirling. His reputation as a twirler earned him invitations to perform at major sporting events and the 1964 New York World's Fair. In 1977, at the height of his basketball career in Houston, Murphy won the Texas State Men's Twirling Championship.

He played basketball for Norwalk High School, where he was All-State three times and All-America twice. He is a member of the Connecticut Coaches Association Hall of Fame and a Connecticut Sportswriters Gold Key Award winner. Norwalk High School's address is now 23 Calvin Murphy Rd. in his honor.

== College career ==
Murphy attended Niagara University, where he was a three-time All-American. He scored 2,548 points in 77 games (33.1 points per game).

One of his best games was a 68-point outing against Syracuse University at Niagara's Gallagher Center. In 1970, he led Niagara to the 1970 NCAA tournament and advanced to the second round, where they lost to Villanova. During his career he was famous for being one of "The Three M's", along with Pete Maravich and Rick Mount, both of whom were NCAA Men's Division I Basketball All-Americans at the same time as Murphy.

Murphy is a member of the Alpha Nu Omega chapter of the Iota Phi Theta fraternity, being initiated alongside fellow future Hall of Famer Elvin Hayes.

== Professional career ==
Murphy was drafted by the San Diego Rockets (now the Houston Rockets) as the first pick in the second round (18th overall) of the 1970 NBA draft. In his first season, after averaging 15.8 points and 4 assists per game, Murphy was nominated to the NBA All-Rookie team. A diminutive guard at 5 feet 9 inches (175 cm), Murphy was known for his quickness and defensive ability. During the 1975 NBA Playoffs, Murphy averaged a postseason career-high of 24.4 points and 5.6 assists per game, as the Rockets advanced past the New York Knicks in the first round (Houston was in the Eastern Conference at the time), before being eliminated by the Boston Celtics in the semifinals. Two seasons later, on March 18, 1978, Murphy set a career high with 57 points scored during a 106–104 loss to the New Jersey Nets. The following year, he earned his only All-Star selection.

During the 1980-81 NBA season, Murphy played a key role in the Rockets making it to the NBA Finals. That postseason run, on April 17, 1981, Murphy led the Rockets to a decisive Western Conference Semifinals Game 7 win over the San Antonio Spurs with 42 points, a postseason career high. After advancing past the Kansas City Kings in the conference finals, in the 1981 NBA Finals Murphy and the Rockets lost to the Boston Celtics in a six-game series. Murphy retired in 1983 to make way for younger players.

Murphy was one of the best free-throw shooters in league history, setting NBA records for most consecutive free throws made and for the highest free throw percentage in a single season (1980–1981), though both records have since been broken. He set many other records within the Rockets organization, including that of all-time leading scorer until that record was broken in 1994 by Hakeem Olajuwon. Despite being among the shortest players in the league, Murphy was considered to be an "enforcer" due to his physical playing style and willingness to confront other players for hard fouls. Murphy was inducted into the Basketball Hall of Fame in 1993.

== Post-playing career ==
After retirement, Murphy continued to work for the Rockets organization in numerous roles, mainly as television analyst for Rockets games. He is currently the halftime and post-game analyst for local Rockets broadcasts on Space City Home Network.

In 2004, he faced trial in Houston for sexually abusing five of his daughters. He was acquitted of these charges in December of that year.

He hosted The Calvin Murphy Show on ESPN Radio's Houston affiliate from 2007 until its cancellation in January 2010.

== Statistics and accomplishments ==
- Inducted to the Naismith Basketball Hall of Fame in 1993
- Jersey #23 retired by the Houston Rockets
- Second highest Free Throw Percentage in a Season – 206 of 215 (95.8%) in 1980–81
- NBA Consecutive Free Throws Made – 3rd, 78 (December 27, 1980 – February 28, 1981)
- 2× NBA free-throw percentage leader: (1981, 1983)
- NBA All-Rookie Team: 1971
- NBA All-Star Team: 1979
- Games played; 1,002
- Career points: 17,949 (17.9 points per game)
- Career steals: 1,165
- Career assists: 4,402 (4.4 apg)
- Career high points: 57 (against New Jersey Nets- March 18, 1978)
- Career playoff high: 42 (against San Antonio Spurs- April 17, 1981)
- 1000-point seasons: 11
- J. Walter Kennedy Citizenship Award: (1979)

== NBA career statistics ==
Legend
GP	Games played	GS	Games started	MPG	Minutes per game
FG%	Field goal percentage	3P%	3-point field goal percentage	FT%	Free throw percentage
RPG	Rebounds per game	APG	Assists per game	SPG	Steals per game
BPG	Blocks per game	PPG	Points per game	**Bold**	Career high

=== Regular season ===
Year	Team	GP	GS	MPG	FG%	3P%	FT%	RPG	APG	SPG	BPG	PPG
1970–71	San Diego	**82**	–	24.6	.458	–	.820	3.0	4.0	–	–	15.8
1971–72	Houston	**82**	–	31.0	.455	–	.890	**3.1**	4.8	–	–	18.2
1972–73	Houston	77	–	22.0	.465	–	.888	1.9	3.4	–	–	13.0
1973–74	Houston	81	–	36.1	**.522**	–	.868	2.3	**7.4**	**1.9**	.0	20.4
1974–75	Houston	78	–	32.2	.484	–	.883	2.2	4.9	1.6	**.1**	18.7
1975–76	Houston	**82**	–	36.5	.493	–	.907	2.5	7.3	1.8	**.1**	21.0
1976–77	Houston	**82**	–	33.7	.490	–	.886	2.1	4.7	1.8	**.1**	17.9
1977–78	Houston	76	–	**38.2**	.491	–	.918	2.2	3.4	1.5	.0	**25.6**
1978–79	Houston	**82**	–	35.9	.496	–	.928	2.1	4.3	1.4	**.1**	20.2
1979–80	Houston	76	–	35.2	.493	.040	.897	2.0	3.9	**1.9**	**.1**	20.0
1980–81	Houston	76	–	26.5	.492	.235	**.958***	1.1	2.9	1.5	**.1**	16.7
1981–82	Houston	64	0	18.8	.427	.063	.909	1.0	2.5	.7	.0	10.2
1982–83	Houston	64	0	22.2	.447	**.286**	.920	1.2	2.5	.9	**.1**	12.8
Career		1,002	–	30.5	.482	.139	.892	2.1	4.4	1.5	.1	17.9
All-Star		1	0	15.0	.600	–	–	1.0	5.0	2.0	.0	6.0

=== Playoffs ===
Year	Team	GP	GS	MPG	FG%	3P%	FT%	RPG	APG	SPG	BPG	PPG
1975	Houston	8	–	**38.1**	.462	–	.895	**2.4**	5.6	1.8	.1	**24.4**
1977	Houston	12	–	35.0	.479	–	.933	1.6	**6.3**	1.6	.2	19.3
1979	Houston	2	–	36.5	.290	–	.889	1.5	3.0	**4.0**	**.5**	13.0
1980	Houston	7	–	37.9	**.537**	**.500**	**1.000**	1.4	3.7	1.6	.0	18.7
1981	Houston	**19**	–	28.4	.495	.286	.967	1.3	3.0	1.4	.0	18.1
1982	Houston	3	–	19.0	.227	.000	.875	1.0	1.3	.3	.0	5.7
Career		51	–	32.5	.475	.286	.932	1.5	4.2	1.5	.1	18.5

== Personal life ==
Murphy's half-brother, Bobby Miller, played college basketball for the Niagara Purple Eagles.

== See also ==
- List of National Basketball Association career free throw percentage leaders
- List of NBA annual free throw percentage leaders
- List of shortest players in National Basketball Association history
- List of National Basketball Association players with 9 or more steals in a game
- List of NCAA Division I men's basketball players with 60 or more points in a game
