= 1975 NBA playoffs =

Postseason tournament

Tournament details
- Dates: April 8–May 25, 1975
- Season: 1974–75
- Teams: 10

Final positions
- Champions: Golden State Warriors (3rd title)
- Runners-up: Washington Bullets
- Semifinalists: Chicago Bulls; Boston Celtics

The 1975 NBA playoffs was the postseason tournament of the National Basketball Association's 1974–75 season. The tournament concluded with the Western Conference champion Golden State Warriors defeating the Eastern Conference champion Washington Bullets 4 games to 0 in the NBA Finals. Rick Barry was named NBA Finals MVP. The Warriors won their third NBA title and first since 1956 as the Philadelphia Warriors.

The playoff format was revised again, as the result of which the first two finishers in each division were guaranteed playoff berths, along with the best third-place team from each conference. Once each conference's qualifiers were selected, they were seeded 1–5, with the fourth and fifth seeds playing a best-of-three series, with the victor advancing to play the first seed in a best-of-seven semifinal, while the second and third seeds played the other semifinal.

The eight-year-old Seattle SuperSonics made their playoff debut, winning the first playoff series in franchise history against the Detroit Pistons. Seattle would go on to make consecutive NBA Finals appearances in 1978 and 1979, winning the championship the latter year.

The Kansas City-Omaha Kings made their first playoff appearance since 1967 as the Cincinnati Royals, and the Houston Rockets made their first playoff appearance since 1969 as the San Diego Rockets.

The 1975 playoffs expanded the number of playoff qualifiers to 10; it would be expanded again to 12 in 1977 and again to its current number of 16 in 1984.

At the time, this was the closest the Chicago Bulls came to an NBA title, losing to the Warriors in the Western Conference Finals 4–3. This was their second and final Western Conference Finals appearance as they would move to the Eastern Conference in 1980. They would not reach the East Finals until 1989, and would not win a title until 1991.

== Bracket ==
First Round
E4	Houston	2
E5	New York	1
W4	Seattle	2
W5	Detroit	1

Conference Semifinals
E1	Boston*	4
E4	Houston	1
Eastern Conference
E3	Buffalo	3
E2	Washington*	4
W1	Golden State*	4
W4	Seattle	2
Western Conference
W3	Kansas City–Omaha	2
W2	Chicago*	4

Conference Finals
E1	Boston*	2
E2	Washington*	4
W1	Golden State*	4
W2	Chicago*	3

NBA Finals
E2	Washington*	0
W1	Golden State*	4

- * Division winner
- Bold Series winner
- Italic Team with home-court advantage

== First round ==
=== Eastern Conference first round ===
==== (4) Houston Rockets vs. (5) New York Knicks ====
April 8

Boxscore

New York Knicks 84, Houston Rockets 99
Scoring by quarter: 27–24, 12–22, 21–21, 24–32
Pts: Walt Frazier 21; Rebs: Phil Jackson 13; Asts: Walt Frazier 11	Pts: Calvin Murphy 22; Rebs: Kevin Kunnert 14; Asts: Mike Newlin 5
Houston leads series, 1–0

Hofheinz Pavilion, Houston, Texas
Attendance: 10,218

April 10

Boxscore

Houston Rockets 96, New York Knicks 106
Scoring by quarter: 15–27, 21–27, 27–30, 33–22
Pts: Rudy Tomjanovich 22; Rebs: Kevin Kunnert 9 Asts: Newlin, Ratleff 4 each	Pts: Walt Frazier 26; Rebs: Phil Jackson 10; Asts: Harthorne Wingo 7
Series tied, 1–1

Madison Square Garden, New York City, New York
Attendance: 19,694

April 12

Boxscore

New York Knicks 86, Houston Rockets 118
Scoring by quarter: 25–28, 18–26, 17–28, 26–36
Pts: Walt Frazier 24; Rebs: Harthorne Wingo 10; Asts: Walt Frazier 4	Pts: Rudy Tomjanovich 25; Rebs: Rudy Tomjanovich 10; Asts: Murphy, Newlin 9 each
Houston wins series, 2–1

Hofheinz Pavilion, Houston, Texas
Attendance: 10,218

This was the first playoff meeting between these two teams.

=== Western Conference first round ===
==== (4) Seattle SuperSonics vs. (5) Detroit Pistons ====
April 8

Boxscore

Detroit Pistons 77, Seattle SuperSonics 90
Scoring by quarter: 12–22, 23–26, 25–20, 17–22
Pts: Howard Porter 21; Rebs: Bob Lanier 14; Asts: Bob Lanier 9	Pts: Fred Brown 23; Rebs: Spencer Haywood 14; Asts: Slick Watts 6
Seattle leads series, 1–0

Seattle Center Coliseum, Seattle, Washington
Attendance: 14,082

April 10

Boxscore

Seattle SuperSonics 106, Detroit Pistons 122
Scoring by quarter: 24–33, 25–24, 23–36, 34–29
Pts: Fred Brown 30; Rebs: Tommy Burleson 10; Asts: Slick Watts 8	Pts: Bing, Trapp 24 each Rebs: George Trapp 14; Asts: Dave Bing 11
Series tied, 1–1

Cobo Arena, Detroit, Michigan
Attendance: 10,490

April 12

Boxscore

Detroit Pistons 93, Seattle SuperSonics 100
Scoring by quarter: 19–23, 22–33, 23–16, 29–28
Pts: Bob Lanier 29; Rebs: Curtis Rowe 13; Asts: Dave Bing 10	Pts: Tommy Burleson 26; Rebs: Tommy Burleson 16; Asts: Slick Watts 6
Seattle wins series, 2–1

Seattle Center Coliseum, Seattle, Washington
Attendance: 14,082

This was the first playoff meeting between these two teams.

== Conference semifinals ==
=== Eastern Conference semifinals ===
==== (1) Boston Celtics vs. (4) Houston Rockets ====
April 14

Boxscore

Houston Rockets 106, Boston Celtics 123
Scoring by quarter: 21–28, 31–35, 23–28, 31–32
Pts: Rudy Tomjanovich 30; Rebs: Tomjanovich, Riley 9 each Asts: Calvin Murphy 6	Pts: John Havlicek 30; Rebs: Dave Cowens 19; Asts: John Havlicek 9
Boston leads series, 1–0

Boston Garden, Boston, Massachusetts
Attendance: 15,320

April 16

Boxscore

Houston Rockets 100, Boston Celtics 112
Scoring by quarter: 26–27, 21–24, 23–38, 30–23
Pts: Calvin Murphy 30; Rebs: Kevin Kunnert 10; Asts: Calvin Murphy 9	Pts: Dave Cowens 28; Rebs: Dave Cowens 18; Asts: John Havlicek 7
Boston leads series, 2–0

Boston Garden, Boston, Massachusetts
Attendance: 13,254

April 19

Boxscore

Boston Celtics 102, Houston Rockets 117
Scoring by quarter: 22–24, 26–28, 20–24, 34–41
Pts: Don Nelson 21; Rebs: Havlicek, Silas 8 each Asts: Silas, White 5 each	Pts: Rudy Tomjanovich 28; Rebs: Rudy Tomjanovich 12; Asts: Murphy, Hawes 7 each
Boston leads series, 2–1

Hofheinz Pavilion, Houston, Texas
Attendance: 10,218

April 22

Boxscore

Boston Celtics 122, Houston Rockets 117
Scoring by quarter: 30–33, 32–18, 31–26, 29–40
Pts: Dave Cowens 31	Pts: Calvin Murphy 35
Boston leads series, 3–1

Hofheinz Pavilion, Houston, Texas
Attendance: 10,218

April 24

Boxscore

Houston Rockets 115, Boston Celtics 128
Scoring by quarter: 22–28, 33–32, 28–36, 32–32
Pts: Tomjanovich, Murphy 27 each Rebs: Ed Ratleff 6 Asts: Ed Ratleff 6	Pts: John Havlicek 28; Rebs: Dave Cowens 12; Asts: John Havlicek 11
Boston wins series, 4–1

Boston Garden, Boston, Massachusetts
Attendance: 15,320

This was the first playoff meeting between these two teams.

==== (2) Washington Bullets vs. (3) Buffalo Braves ====
April 10

Boxscore

Buffalo Braves 113, Washington Bullets 102
Scoring by quarter: 29–26, 23–30, 30–18, 31–28
Pts: Bob McAdoo 35; Rebs: Bob McAdoo 14; Asts: Randy Smith 9	Pts: Phil Chenier 23; Rebs: Elvin Hayes 9 Asts: Jimmy Jones 5
Buffalo leads series, 1–0

Capital Centre, Landover, Maryland
Attendance: 17,140

April 12

Boxscore

Washington Bullets 120, Buffalo Braves 106
Scoring by quarter: 28–29, 32–29, 24–17, 36–31
Pts: Elvin Hayes 34; Rebs: Wes Unseld 25; Asts: Kevin Porter 10	Pts: Bob McAdoo 36; Rebs: Gar Heard 10; Asts: Randy Smith 7
Series tied, 1–1

Buffalo Memorial Auditorium, Buffalo, New York
Attendance: 17,189

April 16

Boxscore

Buffalo Braves 96, Washington Bullets 111
Scoring by quarter: 29–24, 23–29, 18–28, 26–30
Pts: Bob McAdoo 34; Rebs: Bob McAdoo 19; Asts: Randy Smith 7	Pts: Elvin Hayes 30; Rebs: Wes Unseld 18; Asts: Kevin Porter 13
Washington leads series, 2–1

Capital Centre, Landover, Maryland
Attendance: 19,035

April 18

Boxscore

Washington Bullets 102, Buffalo Braves 108
Scoring by quarter: 25–23, 31–24, 19–31, 27–30
Pts: Nick Weatherspoon 21; Rebs: Wes Unseld 23; Asts: Kevin Porter 10	Pts: Bob McAdoo 50; Rebs: Bob McAdoo 21; Asts: Randy Smith 10
Series tied, 2–2

Buffalo Memorial Auditorium, Buffalo, New York
Attendance: 15,307

April 20

Boxscore

Buffalo Braves 93, Washington Bullets 97
Scoring by quarter: 23–18, 16–24, 26–19, 28–36
Pts: Bob McAdoo 34; Rebs: Gar Heard 14; Asts: Heard, Smith 5 each	Pts: Elvin Hayes 46; Rebs: Hayes, Unseld 12 each Asts: Kevin Porter 8
Washington leads series, 3–2

Capital Centre, Landover, Maryland
Attendance: 18,820

April 23

Boxscore

Washington Bullets 96, Buffalo Braves 102
Scoring by quarter: 26–32, 31–27, 16–20, 23–23
Pts: Phil Chenier 25; Rebs: Wes Unseld 12; Asts: Unseld, Chenier 6 each	Pts: Bob McAdoo 37; Rebs: Bob McAdoo 10; Asts: Smith, Weiss 7 each
Series tied, 3–3

Buffalo Memorial Auditorium, Buffalo, New York
Attendance: 15,172

April 25

Boxscore

Buffalo Braves 96, Washington Bullets 115
Scoring by quarter: 13–28, 25–28, 26–25, 32–34
Pts: Bob McAdoo 36; Rebs: Gar Heard 14; Asts: Randy Smith 4	Pts: Phil Chenier 39; Rebs: Wes Unseld 12; Asts: Kevin Porter 8
Washington wins series, 4–3

Capital Centre, Landover, Maryland
Attendance: 19,035

This was the first playoff meeting between these two teams.

=== Western Conference semifinals ===
==== (1) Golden State Warriors vs. (4) Seattle SuperSonics ====
April 14

Boxscore

Seattle SuperSonics 96, Golden State Warriors 123
Scoring by quarter: 18–27, 24–33, 27–32, 27–31
Pts: Leonard Gray 20; Rebs: Leonard Gray 8 Asts: Watts, Brown 4 each	Pts: Rick Barry 39; Rebs: Clifford Ray 13; Asts: Rick Barry 11
Golden State leads series, 1–0

Oakland–Alameda County Coliseum Arena, Oakland, California
Attendance: 12,279

April 16

Boxscore

Seattle SuperSonics 100, Golden State Warriors 99
Scoring by quarter: 24–26, 25–29, 26–23, 25–21
Pts: Spencer Haywood 28; Rebs: Spencer Haywood 15; Asts: Slick Watts 7	Pts: Rick Barry 29; Rebs: Ray, Dickey 10 each Asts: Barry, Beard 6 each
Series tied, 1–1

Oakland–Alameda County Coliseum Arena, Oakland, California
Attendance: 12,787

April 17

Boxscore

Golden State Warriors 105, Seattle SuperSonics 96
Scoring by quarter: 29–28, 23–22, 26–24, 27–22
Pts: Rick Barry 33; Rebs: George Johnson 13; Asts: Rick Barry 7	Pts: Tommy Burleson 25; Rebs: Tommy Burleson 11; Asts: Slick Watts 9
Golden State leads series, 2–1

Seattle Center Coliseum, Seattle, Washington
Attendance: 14,082

April 19

Boxscore

Golden State Warriors 94, Seattle SuperSonics 111
Scoring by quarter: 22–23, 25–34, 25–28, 22–26
Pts: Jamaal Wilkes 22; Rebs: Wilkes, Ray 9 each Asts: three players 3 each	Pts: Fred Brown 37; Rebs: Tommy Burleson 15; Asts: Slick Watts 10
Series tied, 2–2

Seattle Center Coliseum, Seattle, Washington
Attendance: 14,082

April 22

Boxscore

Seattle SuperSonics 100, Golden State Warriors 124
Scoring by quarter: 17–32, 29–25, 21–34, 33–33
Pts: three players 15 each Rebs: Tommy Burleson 8 Asts: Leonard Gray 5	Pts: Jamaal Wilkes 24; Rebs: Ray, G. Johnson 13; Asts: Rick Barry 10
Golden State leads series, 3–2

Oakland–Alameda County Coliseum Arena, Oakland, California
Attendance: 12,787

April 24

Boxscore

Golden State Warriors 105, Seattle SuperSonics 96
Scoring by quarter: 28–20, 18–18, 34–28, 25–30
Pts: Rick Barry 31; Rebs: George Johnson 15; Asts: Charles Johnson 6	Pts: Slick Watts 24; Rebs: Tommy Burleson 11; Asts: Slick Watts 11
Golden State wins series, 4–2

Seattle Center Coliseum, Seattle, Washington
Attendance: 14,082

This was the first playoff meeting between these two teams.

==== (2) Chicago Bulls vs. (3) Kansas City-Omaha Kings ====
April 9

Boxscore

Kansas City–Omaha Kings 89, Chicago Bulls 95
Scoring by quarter: 22–34, 21–20, 21–17, 25–24
Pts: Larry McNeill 22; Rebs: Sam Lacey 13; Asts: Tiny Archibald 7	Pts: Bob Love 38; Rebs: Tom Boerwinkle 12; Asts: Tom Boerwinkle 5
Chicago leads series, 1–0

Chicago Stadium, Chicago, Illinois
Attendance: 15,433

April 13

Boxscore

Chicago Bulls 95, Kansas City–Omaha Kings 102
Scoring by quarter: 25–29, 26–26, 22–28, 22–19
Pts: Chet Walker 20; Rebs: Tom Boerwinkle 12; Asts: Tom Boerwinkle 3	Pts: Jimmy Walker 26; Rebs: Sam Lacey 20; Asts: Tiny Archibald 12
Series tied, 1–1

Kemper Arena, Kansas City, Missouri
Attendance: 11,378

April 16

Boxscore

Kansas City–Omaha Kings 90, Chicago Bulls 93
Scoring by quarter: 24–26, 25–28, 20–20, 21–19
Pts: Tiny Archibald 18; Rebs: Sam Lacey 18; Asts: Scott Wedman 4	Pts: Bob Love 31; Rebs: Tom Boerwinkle 24; Asts: Norm Van Lier 6
Chicago leads series, 2–1

Chicago Stadium, Chicago, Illinois
Attendance: 18,347

April 18

Boxscore

Chicago Bulls 100, Kansas City–Omaha Kings 104 (OT)
Scoring by quarter: 22–22, 19–23, 29–27, 24–22, Overtime: 6–10
Pts: Bob Love 34; Rebs: Tom Boerwinkle 17; Asts: Tom Boerwinkle 5	Pts: Tiny Archibald 28; Rebs: Sam Lacey 16; Asts: Sam Lacey 8
Series tied, 2–2

Kemper Arena, Kansas City, Missouri
Attendance: 14,945

April 20

Boxscore

Kansas City–Omaha Kings 77, Chicago Bulls 104
Scoring by quarter: 13–20, 18–27, 23–22, 23–35
Pts: Wedman, Archibald 13 each Rebs: Sam Lacey 12; Asts: Sam Lacey 5	Pts: Bob Love 30; Rebs: Tom Boerwinkle 19; Asts: Tom Boerwinkle 8
Chicago leads series, 3–2

Chicago Stadium, Chicago, Illinois
Attendance: 16,247

April 23

Boxscore

Chicago Bulls 101, Kansas City–Omaha Kings 89
Scoring by quarter: 23–22, 27–22, 24–21, 27–24
Pts: Bob Love 26; Rebs: Tom Boerwinkle 14; Asts: Norm Van Lier 4	Pts: Tiny Archibald 26; Rebs: Sam Lacey 15; Asts: Sam Lacey 5
Chicago wins series, 4–2

Kemper Arena, Kansas City, Missouri
Attendance: 12,445

This was the first playoff meeting between these two teams.

== Conference finals ==
=== Eastern Conference finals ===
==== (1) Boston Celtics vs. (2) Washington Bullets ====
April 27

Boxscore

Washington Bullets 100, Boston Celtics 95
Scoring by quarter: 23–26, 20–29, 27–18, 30–22
Pts: Elvin Hayes 34; Rebs: Wes Unseld 14; Asts: Kevin Porter 7	Pts: Jo Jo White 27; Rebs: Dave Cowens 19; Asts: Paul Silas 6
Washington leads series, 1–0

Boston Garden, Boston, Massachusetts
Attendance: 15,320

April 30

Boxscore

Boston Celtics 92, Washington Bullets 117
Scoring by quarter: 20–31, 24–29, 30–24, 18–33
Pts: Don Nelson 23; Rebs: Paul Silas 17; Asts: Jo Jo White 7	Pts: Elvin Hayes 29; Rebs: Wes Unseld 16; Asts: Kevin Porter 6
Washington leads series, 2–0

Capital Centre, Landover, Maryland
Attendance: 19,035

May 3

Boxscore

Washington Bullets 90, Boston Celtics 101
Scoring by quarter: 33–31, 24–29, 10–21, 23–20
Pts: Elvin Hayes 23; Rebs: Wes Unseld 15; Asts: Kevin Porter 5	Pts: John Havlicek 26; Rebs: Paul Silas 25; Asts: Jo Jo White 7
Washington leads series, 2–1

Boston Garden, Boston, Massachusetts
Attendance: 15,320

May 7

Boxscore

Boston Celtics 108, Washington Bullets 119
Scoring by quarter: 26–29, 28–36, 34–34, 20–20
Pts: Jo Jo White 32; Rebs: Dave Cowens 17; Asts: Jo Jo White 7	Pts: Phil Chenier 27; Rebs: Wes Unseld 25; Asts: Wes Unseld 7
Washington leads series, 3–1

Capital Centre, Landover, Maryland
Attendance: 19,035

May 9

Boxscore

Washington Bullets 99, Boston Celtics 103
Scoring by quarter: 23–24, 31–35, 23–20, 22–24
Pts: Phil Chenier 32; Rebs: Wes Unseld 13; Asts: Kevin Porter 6	Pts: Dave Cowens 27; Rebs: Dave Cowens 12; Asts: Don Chaney 5
Washington leads series, 3–2

Boston Garden, Boston, Massachusetts
Attendance: 15,320

May 11

Boxscore

Boston Celtics 92, Washington Bullets 98
Scoring by quarter: 18–26, 22–29, 26–18, 26–25
Pts: Dave Cowens 23; Rebs: Dave Cowens 21; Asts: Jo Jo White 6	Pts: Phil Chenier 24; Rebs: Wes Unseld 17; Asts: Kevin Porter 11
Washington wins series, 4–2

Capital Centre, Landover, Maryland
Attendance: 19,035

This was the first playoff meeting between these two teams.

=== Western Conference finals ===
==== (1) Golden State Warriors vs. (2) Chicago Bulls ====
April 27

Boxscore

Chicago Bulls 89, Golden State Warriors 107
Scoring by quarter: 24–26, 15–20, 26–26, 24–35
Pts: Bob Love 37; Rebs: Nate Thurmond 7 Asts: Tom Boerwinkle 4	Pts: Rick Barry 38; Rebs: George Johnson 11; Asts: Butch Beard 9
Golden State leads series, 1–0

Oakland–Alameda County Coliseum Arena, Oakland, California
Attendance: 12,787

April 30

Boxscore

Golden State Warriors 89, Chicago Bulls 90
Scoring by quarter: 20–21, 20–22, 26–19, 23–28
Pts: Rick Barry 26; Rebs: Clifford Ray 7 Asts: Rick Barry 8	Pts: Chet Walker 28; Rebs: Tom Boerwinkle 14; Asts: Tom Boerwinkle 5
Series tied, 1–1

Chicago Stadium, Chicago, Illinois
Attendance: 18,533

May 4

Boxscore

Golden State Warriors 101, Chicago Bulls 108
Scoring by quarter: 37–26, 13–26, 21–29, 30–27
Pts: Butch Beard 28; Rebs: Rick Barry 7 Asts: Rick Barry 9	Pts: Norm Van Lier 35; Rebs: Nate Thurmond 12; Asts: Norm Van Lier 9
Chicago leads series, 2–1

Chicago Stadium, Chicago, Illinois
Attendance: 19,128

May 6

Boxscore

Chicago Bulls 106, Golden State Warriors 111
Scoring by quarter: 35–18, 17–32, 32–32, 22–29
Pts: Bob Love 27; Rebs: Jerry Sloan 12; Asts: Norm Van Lier 9	Pts: Rick Barry 36; Rebs: Clifford Ray 18; Asts: Rick Barry 9
Series tied, 2–2

Oakland–Alameda County Coliseum Arena, Oakland, California
Attendance: 12,787

May 8

Boxscore

Chicago Bulls 89, Golden State Warriors 79
Scoring by quarter: 25–20, 22–19, 20–17, 22–23
Pts: Chet Walker 21; Rebs: Sloan, Boerwinkle 10 each Asts: Van Lier, Boerwinkle 4 each	Pts: Rick Barry 20; Rebs: Clifford Ray 12; Asts: Rick Barry 4
Chicago leads series, 3–2

Oakland–Alameda County Coliseum Arena, Oakland, California
Attendance: 12,787

May 11

Boxscore

Golden State Warriors 86, Chicago Bulls 72
Scoring by quarter: 18–25, 28–13, 21–22, 19–12
Pts: Rick Barry 36; Rebs: Bill Bridges 11; Asts: three players 3 each	Pts: Norm Van Lier 24; Rebs: Sloan, Boerwinkle 8 each Asts: Nate Thurmond 5
Series tied, 3–3

Chicago Stadium, Chicago, Illinois
Attendance: 19,594

May 14

Boxscore

Chicago Bulls 79, Golden State Warriors 83
Scoring by quarter: 21–16, 26–20, 18–23, 14–24
Pts: Chet Walker 21; Rebs: Tom Boerwinkle 16; Asts: Tom Boerwinkle 6	Pts: Jamaal Wilkes 23; Rebs: Clifford Ray 12; Asts: Rick Barry 4
Golden State wins series, 4–3

Oakland–Alameda County Coliseum Arena, Oakland, California

- Chet Walker's final NBA game.

This was the first playoff meeting between these two teams.

== NBA Finals: (E2) Washington Bullets vs. (W1) Golden State Warriors ==
May 18

Boxscore

Golden State Warriors 101, Washington Bullets 95
Scoring by quarter: 17–27, 23–27, 31–18, 30–23
Pts: Rick Barry 24; Rebs: Clifford Ray 16; Asts: Rick Barry 5	Pts: Elvin Hayes 29; Rebs: Hayes, Unseld 16 each Asts: Wes Unseld 6
Golden State leads series, 1–0

Capital Centre, Landover, Maryland
Attendance: 19,035
Referees: Joe Gushue, Earl Strom

May 20

Boxscore

Washington Bullets 91, Golden State Warriors 92
Scoring by quarter: 28–19, 24–27, 21–27, 18–19
Pts: Phil Chenier 30; Rebs: Wes Unseld 20; Asts: Kevin Porter 8	Pts: Rick Barry 36; Rebs: Rick Barry 9 Asts: three players 4 each
Golden State leads series, 2–0

Cow Palace, Daly City, California
Attendance: 13,225
Referees: Richie Powers, Darell Garretson

May 23

Boxscore

Washington Bullets 101, Golden State Warriors 109
Scoring by quarter: 21–26, 27–24, 23–27, 30–32
Pts: Elvin Hayes 24; Rebs: Wes Unseld 15; Asts: Kevin Porter 6	Pts: Rick Barry 38; Rebs: Jamaal Wilkes 10; Asts: Rick Barry 6
Golden State leads series, 3–0

Cow Palace, Daly City, California
Attendance: 13,225
Referees: Jake O'Donnell, Don Murphy

May 25

Boxscore

Golden State Warriors 96, Washington Bullets 95
Scoring by quarter: 20–30, 28–22, 22–21, 26–22
Pts: Rick Barry 20; Rebs: Clifford Ray 11; Asts: Rick Barry 5	Pts: Phil Chenier 26; Rebs: Wes Unseld 16; Asts: Phil Chenier 11
Golden State wins series, 4–0

Capital Centre, Landover, Maryland
Attendance: 19,035
Referees: Richie Powers, Manny Sokol

This was the first playoff meeting between these two teams.
