= Central Division (NBA) =

Division of the National Basketball Association

- Conference: Eastern Conference
- League: National Basketball Association
- Sport: Basketball
- First season: 1970–71 season
- No. of teams: 5
- Most recent champions: Detroit Pistons (10th title) (2025–26)
- Most titles: Milwaukee Bucks (13 titles)

Central Division Teams Location

The Central Division is one of the three divisions in the Eastern Conference of the National Basketball Association (NBA). The division consists of five teams, the Chicago Bulls, the Cleveland Cavaliers, the Detroit Pistons, the Indiana Pacers, and the Milwaukee Bucks. All teams except the Cavaliers are former Midwest Division teams; thus, the Central Division now largely resembles the Midwest Division in the 1970s.

An earlier five-team Central Division previously existed for the 1949–50 season as one of three divisions in the NBA, along with the Western and Eastern divisions. The current Central Division was created at the start of the 1970–71 season, when the league expanded from 14 to 17 teams with the addition of the Buffalo Braves, the Cleveland Cavaliers, and the Portland Trail Blazers. The league realigned itself into two conferences, the Western Conference and the Eastern Conference, with two divisions in each conference. The Central Division began with four inaugural members, the Atlanta Hawks, the Baltimore Bullets, the Cincinnati Royals, and the Cavaliers. The Hawks were moved from the Western Division, while the Bullets and the Royals were moved from the Eastern Division.

Thirteen NBA champions came from the Central Division. The Bulls won six championships, the Pistons won three, the Bucks won two, and the Bullets and Cavaliers won one each. All of the teams, except the 1977–78 Bullets and the 2003–04 Pistons, were division champions. In the 2005–06 season, all five teams from the division qualified for the playoffs. Overall, the Bucks have won thirteen Central Division titles, followed by the Bulls and Pistons with nine division titles each. The Central Division has the highest percentage of teams that have won a championship, with four out of the five teams having won an NBA title. The Pacers are the lone exception, although they have advanced to the NBA Finals on two occasions, in 2000 and 2025.

Since the 2021–22 season, the Central Division champion has received the Wayne Embry Trophy, named after Hall of Famer Wayne Embry who played for the Bucks in the 1968–69 NBA season.

== 2026–27 standings ==
Central Division	W	L	PCT	GB	Home	Road	Div	GP
Indiana Pacers	1	0	1.000	–	0‍–‍0	1‍–‍0	0–0	1
Detroit Pistons	1	0	1.000	–	1‍–‍0	0‍–‍0	0–0	1
Cleveland Cavaliers	0	1	.000	1.0	0‍–‍0	0‍–‍1	0–0	1
Milwaukee Bucks	0	1	.000	1.0	0‍–‍0	0‍–‍1	0–0	1
Chicago Bulls	0	1	.000	1.0	0‍–‍0	0‍–‍1	0–0	1

== Teams ==
Team	City	Year	From
Team	City	Joined	
Chicago Bulls	Chicago, Illinois	1980	Midwest Division
Cleveland Cavaliers	Cleveland, Ohio	1970	—†
Detroit Pistons	Detroit, Michigan	1978	Midwest Division
Indiana Pacers	Indianapolis, Indiana	1979	Midwest Division
Milwaukee Bucks	Milwaukee, Wisconsin	1980	Midwest Division

Notes

- † denotes an expansion team.

=== Former teams ===
Team	City	Year	From	Year	To	Current division
Team	City	Joined		Left		Current division
Atlanta Hawks	Atlanta, Georgia	1970	Western Division	2004	Southeast Division	Southeast Division
Charlotte Hornets (1988–2002; 2004–present)	Charlotte, North Carolina	1990	Midwest Division	2002*	Southeast Division	Southeast Division
Cincinnati Royals (1957–1972, now Sacramento Kings)	Cincinnati, Ohio	1970	Eastern Division	1972	Midwest Division (as Kansas City–Omaha Kings)	Pacific Division
Houston Rockets	Houston, Texas	1972	Western Division	1980	Midwest Division	Southwest Division
New Orleans Hornets (2002–present, now New Orleans Pelicans)	New Orleans, Louisiana	2002*	—†	2004	Southwest Division	Southwest Division
New Orleans Jazz (1974–1979, now Utah Jazz)	New Orleans, Louisiana	1974	—†	1979	Midwest Division (as Utah Jazz)	Northwest Division
Orlando Magic	Orlando, Florida	1989	—†	1990	Midwest Division	Southeast Division
San Antonio Spurs	San Antonio, Texas	1976	ABA‡	1980	Midwest Division	Southwest Division
Toronto Raptors	Toronto, Ontario	1995	—†	2004	Atlantic Division	Atlantic Division
Washington Bullets (1974–1997, now Washington Wizards); Capital Bullets (1973–1974); Baltimore Bullets (1963–1973)	Landover, Maryland; Baltimore, Maryland	1970	Eastern Division	1978	Atlantic Division	Southeast Division

Notes

- † denotes an expansion team.
- ‡ denotes a team that merged from the American Basketball Association (ABA).
- * The Charlotte NBA franchise was inactive from 2002 to 2004 upon the relocation of the Hornets to New Orleans. A new franchise, initially known as the Bobcats, began play in the 2004–05 season. In 2013, the New Orleans Hornets were renamed the Pelicans, and the following season, the Bobcats were renamed the Hornets, acquiring the history and records of the 1988–2002 Hornets while retroactively designating the Pelicans as an expansion team.

=== Team timeline ===
Denotes team that currently in the division
Denotes team that has left the division

== Wayne Embry Trophy ==
Beginning with the 2021–22 season, the Central Division champion has received the Wayne Embry Trophy. As with the other division championship trophies, it is named after one of the African American pioneers from NBA history. Wayne Embry became the NBA's first African American general manager when he was hired by the Milwaukee Bucks in 1972. The Embry Trophy consists of a 200-millimetre (7.9 in) crystal ball.

== Division champions ==
^	Had or tied for the best regular season record for that season

Season	Team	Record	Playoffs result
1970–71	Baltimore Bullets	42–40 (.512)	Lost NBA Finals
1971–72	Baltimore Bullets	38–44 (.463)	Lost conference semifinals
1972–73	Baltimore Bullets	52–30 (.634)	Lost conference semifinals
1973–74	Capital Bullets	47–35 (.573)	Lost conference semifinals
1974–75	Washington Bullets^	60–22 (.732)	Lost NBA Finals
1975–76	Cleveland Cavaliers	49–33 (.598)	Lost conference finals
1976–77	Houston Rockets	49–33 (.598)	Lost conference finals
1977–78	San Antonio Spurs	52–30 (.634)	Lost conference semifinals
1978–79	San Antonio Spurs	48–34 (.585)	Lost conference finals
1979–80	Atlanta Hawks	50–32 (.610)	Lost conference semifinals
1980–81	Milwaukee Bucks	60–22 (.732)	Lost conference semifinals
1981–82	Milwaukee Bucks	55–27 (.671)	Lost conference semifinals
1982–83	Milwaukee Bucks	51–31 (.622)	Lost conference finals
1983–84	Milwaukee Bucks	50–32 (.610)	Lost conference finals
1984–85	Milwaukee Bucks	59–23 (.720)	Lost conference semifinals
1985–86	Milwaukee Bucks	57–25 (.695)	Lost conference finals
1986–87	Atlanta Hawks	57–25 (.695)	Lost conference semifinals
1987–88	Detroit Pistons	54–28 (.659)	Lost NBA Finals
1988–89	Detroit Pistons^	63–19 (.768)	Won NBA Finals
1989–90	Detroit Pistons	59–23 (.720)	Won NBA Finals
1990–91	Chicago Bulls	61–21 (.744)	Won NBA Finals
1991–92	Chicago Bulls^	67–15 (.817)	Won NBA Finals
1992–93	Chicago Bulls	57–25 (.695)	Won NBA Finals
1993–94	Atlanta Hawks	57–25 (.695)	Lost conference semifinals
1994–95	Indiana Pacers	52–30 (.634)	Lost conference finals
1995–96	Chicago Bulls^	72–10 (.878)	Won NBA Finals
1996–97	Chicago Bulls^	69–13 (.841)	Won NBA Finals
1997–98	Chicago Bulls^	62–20 (.756)	Won NBA Finals
1998–99^{[a]}	Indiana Pacers	33–17 (.660)	Lost conference finals
1999–00	Indiana Pacers	56–26 (.683)	Lost NBA Finals
2000–01	Milwaukee Bucks	52–30 (.634)	Lost conference finals
2001–02	Detroit Pistons	50–32 (.610)	Lost conference semifinals
2002–03	Detroit Pistons	50–32 (.610)	Lost conference finals
2003–04	Indiana Pacers^	61–21 (.744)	Lost conference finals
2004–05	Detroit Pistons	54–28 (.659)	Lost NBA Finals
2005–06	Detroit Pistons^	64–18 (.780)	Lost conference finals
2006–07	Detroit Pistons	53–29 (.646)	Lost conference finals
2007–08	Detroit Pistons	59–23 (.720)	Lost conference finals
2008–09	Cleveland Cavaliers^	66–16 (.805)	Lost conference finals
2009–10	Cleveland Cavaliers^	61–21 (.744)	Lost conference semifinals
2010–11	Chicago Bulls^	62–20 (.756)	Lost conference finals
2011–12^{[b]}	Chicago Bulls^	50–16 (.758)	Lost first round
2012–13	Indiana Pacers	49–32 (.605)†	Lost conference finals
2013–14	Indiana Pacers	56–26 (.683)	Lost conference finals
2014–15	Cleveland Cavaliers	53–29 (.646)	Lost NBA Finals
2015–16	Cleveland Cavaliers	57–25 (.695)	Won NBA Finals
2016–17	Cleveland Cavaliers	51–31 (.622)	Lost NBA Finals
2017–18	Cleveland Cavaliers	50–32 (.610)	Lost NBA Finals
2018–19	Milwaukee Bucks^	60–22 (.732)	Lost conference finals
2019–20	Milwaukee Bucks^	56–17 (.767)	Lost conference semifinals
2020–21	Milwaukee Bucks	46–26 (.639)	Won NBA Finals
2021–22	Milwaukee Bucks	51–31 (.622)	Lost conference semifinals
2022–23	Milwaukee Bucks^	58–24 (.707)	Lost first round
2023–24	Milwaukee Bucks	49–33 (.598)	Lost first round
2024–25	Cleveland Cavaliers	64–18 (.780)	Lost conference semifinals
2025–26	Detroit Pistons	60–22 (.732)	Lost conference semifinals

=== Titles by team ===
^	Denotes team that has left the division

Team	Titles	Season(s) won
Milwaukee Bucks	13	1980–81, 1981–82, 1982–83, 1983–84, 1984–85, 1985–86, 2000–01, 2018–19, 2019–20, 2020–21, 2021–22, 2022–23, 2023–24
Detroit Pistons	10	1987–88, 1988–89, 1989–90, 2001–02, 2002–03, 2004–05, 2005–06, 2006–07, 2007–08, 2025–26
Chicago Bulls	8	1990–91, 1991–92, 1992–93, 1995–96, 1996–97, 1997–98, 2010–11, 2011–12
Cleveland Cavaliers	8	1975–76, 2008–09, 2009–10, 2014–15, 2015–16, 2016–17, 2017–18, 2024–25
Indiana Pacers	6	1994–95, 1998–99, 1999–00, 2003–04, 2012–13, 2013–14
Baltimore / Capital / Washington Bullets^ (now Washington Wizards)	5	1970–71, 1971–72, 1972–73, 1973–74, 1974–75
Atlanta Hawks^	3	1979–80, 1986–87, 1993–94
San Antonio Spurs^	2	1977–78, 1978–79
Houston Rockets^	1	1976–77

== Season results ==
^	Denotes team that won the NBA Finals
^{+}	Denotes team that won the Conference finals, but lost the NBA Finals
*	Denotes team that qualified for the NBA Playoffs
×	Denotes team that qualified for the NBA play-in tournament
†	Denotes team that did not qualify for the 2020 NBA Bubble season restart

Season	Team (record)							
Season	1st	2nd	3rd	4th	5th	6th	7th	8th
1970: The Central Division was formed with four inaugural members. An expansion team, the Cleveland Cavaliers, joined the division. The Atlanta Hawks joined from the Western Division, while the Cincinnati Royals and the Baltimore Bullets joined from the Eastern Division.
1970–71	Baltimore^{+} (42–40)	Atlanta* (36–46)	Cincinnati (33–49)	Cleveland (15–67)				
1971–72	Baltimore* (38–44)	Atlanta* (36–46)	Cincinnati (30–52)	Cleveland (23–59)				
1972: The Houston Rockets joined from the Pacific Division. The Cincinnati Royals, who relocated and became the Kansas City–Omaha Kings, left to join the Midwest Division.
1972–73	Baltimore* (52–30)	Atlanta* (46–36)	Houston (33–49)	Cleveland (32–50)				
1973: The Baltimore Bullets relocated and became the Capital Bullets.
1973–74	Capital* (47–35)	Atlanta (35–47)	Houston (32–50)	Cleveland (29–53)				
1974: An expansion team, the New Orleans Jazz, joined the division. The Capital Bullets were renamed the Washington Bullets.
1974–75	Washington^{+} (60–22)	Houston* (41–41)	Cleveland (40–42)	Atlanta (31–51)	New Orleans (23–59)			
1975–76	Cleveland* (49–33)	Washington* (48–34)	Houston (40–42)	New Orleans (38–44)	Atlanta (29–53)			
1976: An American Basketball Association (ABA) team that merged with the NBA, the San Antonio Spurs, joined the division.
1976–77	Houston* (49–33)	Washington* (48–34)	San Antonio* (44–38)	Cleveland* (43–39)	New Orleans (35–47)	Atlanta (31–51)		
1977–78	San Antonio* (52–30)	Washington^ (44–38)	Cleveland* (43–39)	Atlanta* (41–41)	New Orleans (39–43)	Houston (28–54)		
1978: The Detroit Pistons joined from the Midwest Division. The Washington Bullets left to join the Atlantic Division.
1978–79	San Antonio* (48–34)	Houston* (47–35)	Atlanta* (46–36)	Detroit (30–52)	Cleveland (30–52)	New Orleans (26–56)		
1979: The Indiana Pacers joined from the Midwest Division. The New Orleans Jazz, who relocated and became the Utah Jazz, left to join the Midwest Division.
1979–80	Atlanta* (50–32)	Houston* (41–41)	San Antonio* (41–41)	Indiana (37–45)	Cleveland (37–45)	Detroit (16–66)		
1980: The Chicago Bulls and the Milwaukee Bucks joined from the Midwest Division. The Houston Rockets and the San Antonio Spurs left to join the Midwest Division.
1980–81	Milwaukee* (60–22)	Chicago* (45–37)	Indiana* (44–38)	Atlanta (31–51)	Cleveland (28–54)	Detroit (21–61)		
1981–82	Milwaukee* (55–27)	Atlanta* (42–40)	Detroit (39–43)	Indiana (35–47)	Chicago (34–48)	Cleveland (15–67)		
1982–83	Milwaukee* (51–31)	Atlanta* (43–39)	Detroit (37–45)	Chicago (28–54)	Cleveland (23–59)	Indiana (20–62)		
1983–84	Milwaukee* (50–32)	Detroit* (49–33)	Atlanta* (40–42)	Cleveland (28–54)	Chicago (27–55)	Indiana (26–56)		
1984–85	Milwaukee* (59–23)	Detroit* (46–36)	Chicago* (38–44)	Cleveland* (36–46)	Atlanta (34–48)	Indiana (22–60)		
1985–86	Milwaukee* (57–25)	Atlanta* (50–32)	Detroit* (46–36)	Chicago* (30–52)	Cleveland (29–53)	Indiana (26–56)		
1986–87	Atlanta* (57–25)	Detroit* (52–30)	Milwaukee* (50–32)	Indiana* (41–41)	Chicago* (40–42)	Cleveland (31–51)		
1987–88	Detroit^{+} (54–28)	Chicago* (50–32)	Atlanta* (50–32)	Milwaukee* (42–40)	Cleveland* (42–40)	Indiana (38–44)		
1988–89	Detroit^ (63–19)	Cleveland* (57–25)	Atlanta* (52–30)	Milwaukee* (49–33)	Chicago* (47–35)	Indiana (28–54)		
1989: An expansion team, the Orlando Magic, joined the division temporarily for one season.
1989–90	Detroit^ (59–23)	Chicago* (55–27)	Milwaukee* (44–38)	Indiana* (42–40)	Cleveland* (42–40)	Atlanta (41–41)	Orlando (18–64)	
1990: The Charlotte Hornets joined from the Midwest Division. The Orlando Magic left to join the Midwest Division temporarily for one season, then the Atlantic Division permanently thereafter.
1990–91	Chicago^ (61–21)	Detroit* (50–32)	Milwaukee* (48–34)	Atlanta* (43–39)	Indiana* (41–41)	Cleveland (33–49)	Charlotte (26–56)	
1991–92	Chicago^ (67–15)	Cleveland* (57–25)	Detroit* (48–34)	Indiana* (40–42)	Atlanta (38–44)	Milwaukee (31–51)	Charlotte (31–51)	
1992–93	Chicago^ (57–25)	Cleveland* (54–28)	Charlotte* (44–38)	Atlanta* (43–39)	Indiana* (41–41)	Detroit (40–42)	Milwaukee (28–54)	
1993–94	Atlanta* (57–25)	Chicago* (55–27)	Indiana* (47–35)	Cleveland* (47–35)	Charlotte (41–41)	Milwaukee (20–62)	Detroit (20–62)	
1994–95	Indiana* (52–30)	Charlotte* (50–32)	Chicago* (47–35)	Cleveland* (43–39)	Atlanta* (42–40)	Milwaukee (34–48)	Detroit (28–54)	
1995: An expansion team, the Toronto Raptors, joined the division.
1995–96	Chicago^ (72–10)	Indiana* (52–30)	Cleveland* (47–35)	Atlanta* (46–36)	Detroit* (46–36)	Charlotte (41–41)	Milwaukee (25–57)	Toronto (21–61)
1996–97	Chicago^ (69–13)	Atlanta* (56–26)	Detroit* (54–28)	Charlotte* (54–28)	Cleveland (42–40)	Indiana (39–43)	Milwaukee (33–49)	Toronto (30–52)
1997–98	Chicago^ (62–20)	Indiana* (58–24)	Charlotte* (51–31)	Atlanta* (50–32)	Cleveland* (47–35)	Detroit (37–45)	Milwaukee (36–46)	Toronto (16–66)
1998–99^{[a]}	Indiana* (33–17)	Atlanta* (31–19)	Detroit* (29–21)	Milwaukee* (28–22)	Charlotte (26–24)	Toronto (23–27)	Cleveland (22–28)	Chicago (13–37)
1999–00	Indiana^{+} (56–26)	Charlotte* (49–33)	Toronto* (45–37)	Detroit* (42–40)	Milwaukee* (42–40)	Cleveland (32–50)	Atlanta (28–54)	Chicago (17–65)
2000–01	Milwaukee* (52–30)	Toronto* (47–35)	Charlotte* (46–36)	Indiana* (41–41)	Detroit (32–50)	Cleveland (30–52)	Atlanta (25–57)	Chicago (15–67)
2001–02	Detroit* (50–32)	Charlotte* (44–38)	Toronto* (42–40)	Indiana* (42–40)	Milwaukee (41–41)	Atlanta (33–49)	Cleveland (29–53)	Chicago (21–61)
2002: The Charlotte Hornets relocated and became the New Orleans Hornets. The New Orleans franchise, now known as the Pelicans, were retroactively designated as an expansion team in 2014, when the current Charlotte Hornets acquired the historical records of the 1988–2002 Hornets, while the Pelicans kept records of the Hornets after relocation to New Orleans.
2002–03	Detroit* (50–32)	Indiana* (48–34)	New Orleans* (47–35)	Milwaukee* (42–40)	Atlanta (35–47)	Chicago (30–52)	Toronto (24–58)	Cleveland (17–65)
2003–04	Indiana* (61–21)	Detroit^ (54–28)	New Orleans* (41–41)	Milwaukee* (41–41)	Cleveland (35–47)	Toronto (33–49)	Atlanta (28–54)	Chicago (23–59)
2004: The New Orleans Hornets left to join the Southwest Division. The Atlanta Hawks left to join the Southeast Division. The Toronto Raptors left to join the Atlantic Division.
2004–05	Detroit^{+} (54–28)	Chicago* (47–35)	Indiana* (44–38)	Cleveland (42–40)	Milwaukee (30–52)			
2005–06	Detroit* (64–18)	Cleveland* (50–32)	Indiana* (41–41)	Chicago* (41–41)	Milwaukee* (40–42)			
2006–07	Detroit* (53–29)	Cleveland^{+} (50–32)	Chicago* (49–33)	Indiana (35–47)	Milwaukee (28–54)			
2007–08	Detroit* (59–23)	Cleveland* (45–37)	Indiana (36–46)	Chicago (33–49)	Milwaukee (26–56)			
2008–09	Cleveland* (66–16)	Chicago* (41–41)	Detroit* (39–43)	Indiana (36–46)	Milwaukee (34–48)			
2009–10	Cleveland* (61–21)	Milwaukee* (46–36)	Chicago* (41–41)	Indiana (32–50)	Detroit (27–55)			
2010–11	Chicago* (62–20)	Indiana* (37–45)	Milwaukee (35–47)	Detroit (30–52)	Cleveland (19–63)			
2011–12^{[b]}	Chicago* (50–16)	Indiana* (42–24)	Milwaukee (31–35)	Detroit (25–41)	Cleveland (21–45)			
2012–13	Indiana* (49–32)	Chicago* (45–37)	Milwaukee* (38–44)	Detroit (29–53)	Cleveland (24–58)			
2013–14	Indiana* (56–26)	Chicago* (48–34)	Cleveland (33–49)	Detroit (29–53)	Milwaukee (15–67)			
2014–15	Cleveland^{+} (53–29)	Chicago* (50–32)	Milwaukee* (41–41)	Indiana (38–44)	Detroit (32–50)			
2015–16	Cleveland^ (57–25)	Indiana* (45–37)	Detroit* (44–38)	Chicago (42–40)	Milwaukee (33–49)			
2016–17	Cleveland^{+} (51–31)	Milwaukee* (42–40)	Indiana* (42–40)	Chicago* (41–41)	Detroit (37–45)			
2017–18	Cleveland^{+} (50–32)	Indiana* (48–34)	Milwaukee* (44–38)	Detroit (39–43)	Chicago (27–55)			
2018–19	Milwaukee* (60–22)	Indiana* (48–34)	Detroit* (41–41)	Chicago (22–60)	Cleveland (19–63)			
2019–20	Milwaukee* (56–17)	Indiana* (45–28)	Chicago† (22–43)	Detroit† (20–46)	Cleveland† (19–46)			
2020–21	Milwaukee^ (46–26)	Indiana× (34–38)	Chicago (31–41)	Cleveland (22–50)	Detroit (20–52)			
2021–22	Milwaukee* (51–31)	Chicago* (46–36)	Cleveland× (44–38)	Indiana (25–57)	Detroit (23–59)			
2022–23	Milwaukee* (58–24)	Cleveland* (51–31)	Chicago× (40–42)	Indiana (35–47)	Detroit (17–65)			
2023–24	Milwaukee* (49–33)	Cleveland* (48–34)	Indiana* (47–35)	Chicago× (39–43)	Detroit (14–68)			
2024–25	Cleveland* (64–18)	Indiana^{+} (50–32)	Milwaukee* (48–34)	Detroit* (44–38)	Chicago× (39–43)			
2025–26	Detroit* (60–22)	Cleveland* (52–30)	Milwaukee (32–50)	Chicago (31–51)	Indiana (19–63)			

== 1949–50 season ==
Before the 1949–50 season, the BAA merged with the NBL and was renamed NBA. The number of teams competed increased from 12 teams to 17 teams and the league realigned itself to three divisions, creating the Central Division. The division consisted of five teams, the Chicago Stags, the Fort Wayne Pistons, the Minneapolis Lakers, the Rochester Royals and the St. Louis Bombers. All five teams joined from the Western Division. The Minneapolis Lakers won the Central Division title. The division was disbanded before the 1950–51 season, after six teams folded and the league realigned itself back into two divisions. The Stags and the Bombers folded, while the other three teams returned to the Western Division.

^	Denotes team that won the NBA championships
*	Denotes team that qualified for the NBA Playoffs

Season	Team (record)				
Season	1st	2nd	3rd	4th	5th
1949: The Central Division was formed with five inaugural members. The Chicago Stags, the Fort Wayne Pistons, the Minneapolis Lakers, the Rochester Royals and the St. Louis Bombers joined from the Western Division.
1949–50	Minneapolis^ (51–17)	Rochester* (51–17)	Fort Wayne* (40–28)	Chicago* (40–28)	St. Louis (26–42)
1950: The Central Division ceased to exist. The Chicago Stags and the St. Louis Bombers folded. The Fort Wayne Pistons, the Minneapolis Lakers and the Rochester Royals re-joined the Western Division.

== See also ==
- Atlantic Division (NBA)
- Pacific Division (NBA)
- Southwest Division (NBA)
- Midwest Division (NBA)

== Notes ==
- ^{a 1} ^{2} Because of a lockout, the season did not start until February 5, 1999, and all 29 teams played a shortened 50-game regular season schedule.
- ^{b 1} ^{2} Because of a lockout, the season did not start until December 25, 2011, and all 30 teams played a shortened 66-game regular season schedule.
- †In the aftermath of the Boston Marathon bombing, the NBA canceled the April 16 game scheduled in Boston between the Celtics and the Pacers; the game was not rescheduled because it would have had no impact on either team's playoff seedings.
