= 1976–77 San Antonio Spurs season =

- Head coach: Doug Moe
- General manager: John Begzos
- Owner: Angelo Drossos
- Arena: HemisFair Arena

Results
- Record: 44–38 (.537)
- Place: Division: 3rd (Central); Conference: 5th (Eastern)
- Playoff finish: First round (lost to Celtics 0–2)
- Stats at Basketball Reference

Local media
- Television: KMOL-TV
- Radio: WOAI

The 1976–77 San Antonio Spurs season was the Spurs first season in the NBA. Months earlier, the Spurs were part of the American Basketball Association (Six in Dallas and three in San Antonio). The ABA had ended its ninth and last campaign. Of the seven remaining ABA teams, four joined the NBA: the Denver Nuggets, New York Nets, Indiana Pacers and San Antonio Spurs. The Kentucky Colonels and Spirits of St. Louis agreed to take a cash settlement and cease operations. Immediately, the ABA players were dispersed across the new 22-team league. The other ABA teams from the prior season were all folded prior to the ABA–NBA merger: the Baltimore Claws, Utah Stars, San Diego Sails and Virginia Squires.

The Spurs made their debut on October 22 stunning the 76ers in Philadelphia by a score of 121–118. Afterwards, the Spurs would win just 1 of their next 7 games. In November, the Spurs would win 6 straight. By February the Spurs were 10 games over .500, and were the NBA's highest scoring team at 115 points per game. Despite the offensive flash, the Spurs also had the league's worst defense at 114 points per game as they struggled to finish in 3rd place in the Central Division with a record of 44–38. In the playoffs, the Spurs were swept in 2 straight by the defending world champion Boston Celtics.

== Offseason ==
=== NBA draft ===
Neither the Spurs, Indiana Pacers, New York Nets or Denver Nuggets were allowed to participate in the 1976 NBA draft.

=== ABA Dispersal Draft ===
The American Basketball Association merged with the NBA in 1976. Of the teams remaining in the ABA, four joined the NBA. The two teams, the Kentucky Colonels and Spirits of St. Louis, which folded had their players assigned to a dispersal draft for draft purposes.

Pick	Player	Nationality	NBA Team	ABA Team	Purchase Price
10	Louie Dampier (PG)	United States	San Antonio Spurs	Kentucky Colonels	$20,000

== Roster ==
San Antonio Spurs roster
Players

Pos.	No.	Player	Height	Weight	DOB	From
F	30	Allan Bristow	6 ft 7 in (2.01 m)	210 lb (95 kg)	August 23, 1951	Virginia Tech
PG	24	Mack Calvin	6 ft 0 in (1.83 m)	165 lb (75 kg)	July 27, 1947	USC
SG	14	Mike D'Antoni	6 ft 3 in (1.91 m)	185 lb (84 kg)	May 8, 1951	Marshall
G	10	Louie Dampier	6 ft 0 in (1.83 m)	170 lb (77 kg)	November 20, 1944	Kentucky
F/C	25	Coby Dietrick	6 ft 10 in (2.08 m)	220 lb (100 kg)	July 23, 1948	San José State
G	12	Mike Gale	6 ft 4 in (1.93 m)	185 lb (84 kg)	July 18, 1950	Elizabeth City State
G/F	44	George Gervin	6 ft 7 in (2.01 m)	180 lb (82 kg)	April 27, 1952	Eastern Michigan
G	22	George Karl	6 ft 2 in (1.88 m)	185 lb (84 kg)	May 12, 1951	North Carolina
F	35	Larry Kenon	6 ft 9 in (2.06 m)	205 lb (93 kg)	December 13, 1952	Memphis
SG	21	Louie Nelson	6 ft 3 in (1.91 m)	190 lb (86 kg)	May 28, 1951	Washington
F	53	Mark Olberding	6 ft 8 in (2.03 m)	225 lb (102 kg)	April 21, 1956	Minnesota
F/C	5	Billy Paultz	6 ft 11 in (2.11 m)	235 lb (107 kg)	July 30, 1948	St. John's
G	13	James Silas	6 ft 1 in (1.85 m)	180 lb (82 kg)	February 11, 1949	Stephen F. Austin
G	15	Henry Ward	6 ft 4 in (1.93 m)	195 lb (88 kg)	January 30, 1952	Jackson State

Coaches
Head coach
- Doug Moe (North Carolina)
Assistant(s)
- Bob Bass (Oklahoma Baptist)

Legend
- (DP) Unsigned draft pick
- (FA) Free agent
- (S) Suspended
- Injured

== Regular season ==
=== Season standings ===
Central Division	W	L	PCT	GB	Home	Road	Div
y-Houston Rockets	49	33	.598	–	34–7	15–26	13–7
x-Washington Bullets	48	34	.585	1	32–9	16–25	11–9
x-San Antonio Spurs	44	38	.537	5	31–10	13–28	9–11
x-Cleveland Cavaliers	43	39	.524	6	29–12	14–27	8–12
New Orleans Jazz	35	47	.427	14	26–15	9–32	10–10
Atlanta Hawks	31	51	.378	18	19–22	12–29	9–11

#	Eastern Conference				
#	Team	W	L	PCT	GB
1	z-Philadelphia 76ers	50	32	.610	–
2	y-Houston Rockets	49	33	.598	1
3	x-Washington Bullets	48	34	.585	2
4	x-Boston Celtics	44	38	.537	6
5	x-San Antonio Spurs	44	38	.537	6
6	x-Cleveland Cavaliers	43	39	.524	7
7	New York Knicks	40	42	.488	10
8	New Orleans Jazz	35	47	.427	15
9	Atlanta Hawks	31	51	.378	19
10	Buffalo Braves	30	52	.366	20
11	New York Nets	22	60	.268	28

=== Game log ===
==== October ====
Record: 2–4; home: 1–1; road: 1–3

#	Date	Visitor	Score	Home	Record
1	October 22, 1976	San Antonio Spurs	121–118	Philadelphia 76ers	1–0
2	October 23, 1976	San Antonio Spurs	98–117	New York Knicks	1–1
3	October 26, 1976	San Antonio Spurs	114–122	Atlanta Hawks	1–2
4	October 27, 1976	Phoenix Suns	106–115	San Antonio Spurs	2–2
5	October 29, 1976	San Antonio Spurs	102–130	Kansas City Kings	2–3
6	October 30, 1976	Boston Celtics	126–117	San Antonio Spurs	2–4

==== November ====
Record: 9–5; home: 8–0; road: 1–5

#	Date	Visitor	Score	Home	Record
7	November 3, 1976	San Antonio Spurs	97–113	Indiana Pacers	2–5
8	November 5, 1976	San Antonio Spurs	119–127	New Orleans Jazz	2–6
9	November 6, 1976	Indiana Pacers	94–113	San Antonio Spurs	3–6
10	November 9, 1976	Seattle SuperSonics	114–138	San Antonio Spurs	4–6
11	November 11, 1976	New York Nets	104–108	San Antonio Spurs	5–6
12	November 13, 1976	Portland Trail Blazers	101–113	San Antonio Spurs	6–6
13	November 16, 1976	Buffalo Braves	112–114	San Antonio Spurs	7–6
14	November 18, 1976	Kansas City Kings	104–129	San Antonio Spurs	8–6
15	November 20, 1976	San Antonio Spurs	103–109	Washington Bullets	8–7
16	November 23, 1976	San Antonio Spurs	122–115	Buffalo Braves	9–7
17	November 24, 1976	San Antonio Spurs	91–99	New York Nets	9–8
18	November 26, 1976	Golden State Warriors	121–123	San Antonio Spurs	10–8
19	November 27, 1976	San Antonio Spurs	89–75	Houston Rockets	10–9
20	November 30, 1976	Detroit Pistons	129–130	San Antonio Spurs	11–9

==== December ====
Record: 7–7; home: 4–1; road: 3–6

#	Date	Visitor	Score	Home	Record
21	December 2, 1976	San Antonio Spurs	116–124	Golden State Warriors	11–10
22	December 3, 1976	San Antonio Spurs	105–114	Los Angeles Lakers	11–11
23	December 5, 1976	San Antonio Spurs	98–103	Phoenix Suns	11–12
24	December 8, 1976	Atlanta Hawks	117–106	San Antonio Spurs	11–13
25	December 10, 1976	San Antonio Spurs	136–120	Milwaukee Bucks	12–13
26	December 11, 1976	New Orleans Jazz	106–121	San Antonio Spurs	13–13
27	December 14, 1976	New York Knicks	98–111	San Antonio Spurs	14–13
28	December 15, 1976	San Antonio Spurs	102–116	Indiana Pacers	14–14
29	December 17, 1976	San Antonio Spurs	101–103	Chicago Bulls	14–15
30	December 19, 1976	San Antonio Spurs	105–106	Cleveland Cavaliers	14–16
31	December 21, 1976	Golden State Warriors	123–120	San Antonio Spurs	15–16
32	December 23, 1976	Washington Bullets	116–118	San Antonio Spurs	16–16
33	December 26, 1976	San Antonio Spurs	110–105	Kansas City Kings	17–16
34	December 28, 1976	Philadelphia 76ers	116–127	San Antonio Spurs	18–16

== Playoffs ==
1977 playoff game log
First Round: 0–2 (home: 0–1; road: 0–1)

Game	Date	Team	Score	High points	High rebounds	High assists	Location Attendance	Series
1	April 12	@ Boston	L 94–104	Kenon, Gervin (20)	Billy Paultz (10)	Louie Dampier (5)	Boston Garden; 13,505	0–1
2	April 15	Boston	L 109–113	George Gervin (30)	three players tied (7)	Mike Gale (7)	HemisFair Arena; 12,067	0–2

1977 schedule

== Player statistics ==
=== Ragular season ===
Player	POS	GP	GS	MP	REB	AST	STL	BLK	PTS	MPG	RPG	APG	SPG	BPG	PPG
George Gervin	SF	82	82	2,705	454	238	105	104	1,895	33.0	5.5	2.9	1.3	1.3	23.1
Billy Paultz	C	82	82	2,694	687	223	55	173	1,280	32.9	8.4	2.7	.7	2.1	15.6
Mike Gale	SG	82		2,598	273	473	191	50	843	31.7	3.3	5.8	2.3	.6	10.3
Allan Bristow	SF	82		2,017	348	240	89	2	936	24.6	4.2	2.9	1.1	.0	11.4
Mark Olberding	PF	82		1,949	449	119	59	29	853	23.8	5.5	1.5	.7	.4	10.4
Coby Dietrick	C	82		1,772	372	148	88	57	689	21.6	4.5	1.8	1.1	.7	8.4
Louie Dampier	PG	80		1,634	76	234	49	15	530	20.4	1.0	2.9	.6	.2	6.6
Larry Kenon	PF	78		2,936	879	229	167	60	1,705	37.6	11.3	2.9	2.1	.8	21.9
Mack Calvin^{†}	PG	35		606	31	104	23	1	309	17.3	.9	3.0	.7	.0	8.8
George Karl	PG	29		251	17	46	10	0	79	8.7	.6	1.6	.3	.0	2.7
Henry Ward	SG	27		171	33	6	6	5	83	6.3	1.2	.2	.2	.2	3.1
James Silas	PG	22		356	32	50	13	3	209	16.2	1.5	2.3	.6	.1	9.5
Louie Nelson	SG	4		57	7	3	2	0	18	14.3	1.8	.8	.5	.0	4.5
Mike D'Antoni	SG	2		9	2	2	0	0	3	4.5	1.0	1.0	.0	.0	1.5

- ^{†} Denotes player spent time with another team in the season. Stats reflect time with the Spurs only.

=== Playoffs ===
Player	POS	GP	GS	MP	REB	AST	STL	BLK	PTS	MPG	RPG	APG	SPG	BPG	PPG
Larry Kenon	PF	2		79	15	6	5	1	34	39.5	7.5	3.0	2.5	.5	17.0
Billy Paultz	C	2		74	17	5	2	1	34	37.0	8.5	2.5	1.0	.5	17.0
Mike Gale	SG	2		67	10	10	4	2	22	33.5	5.0	5.0	2.0	1.0	11.0
Coby Dietrick	C	2		64	9	5	1	0	26	32.0	4.5	2.5	.5	.0	13.0
George Gervin	SF	2		62	11	3	1	2	50	31.0	5.5	1.5	.5	1.0	25.0
Louie Dampier	PG	2		62	3	9	1	1	12	31.0	1.5	4.5	.5	.5	6.0
Mark Olberding	PF	2		42	7	2	0	1	13	21.0	3.5	1.0	.0	.5	6.5
Allan Bristow	SF	2		28	4	7	2	0	8	14.0	2.0	3.5	1.0	.0	4.0
Henry Ward	SG	1		1	0	0	0	0	4	1.0	.0	.0	.0	.0	4.0
George Karl	PG	1		1	0	0	0	0	0	1.0	.0	.0	.0	.0	.0

== Awards and records ==
- George Gervin, All-NBA Second Team
