= Rudy White =

American basketball player (born 1953)

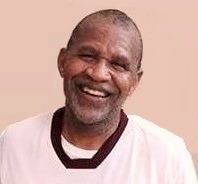

Personal information
- Born: June 23, 1953 (age 73) Silver City, New Mexico, U.S.
- Listed height: 6 ft 2 in (1.88 m)
- Listed weight: 195 lb (88 kg)

Career information
- High school: Phoenix Union (Phoenix, Arizona)
- College: Arizona State (1972–1975)
- NBA draft: 1975: 3rd round, 47th overall pick
- Drafted by: Houston Rockets
- Playing career: 1975–1981
- Position: Shooting guard
- Number: 32, 15, 10

Career history
- 1975–1979: Houston Rockets
- 1980: Golden State Warriors
- 1980–1981: Seattle SuperSonics
- 1988: Los Angeles Jaguars
- Stats at NBA.com
- Stats at Basketball Reference

Rudolph White (born June 23, 1953) is an American former basketball player. He was a 6-foot-2-inch (1.88 m), 195-pound (88 kg) guard born in Silver City, New Mexico and attended Arizona State University and played in the National Basketball Association (NBA) from 1975 to 1981 with three teams.

White was selected in the third round of the 1975 NBA draft by the Houston Rockets and in the second round of the 1975 ABA Draft by the Spirits of St. Louis.

== Career statistics ==
Legend
GP	Games played	GS	Games started	MPG	Minutes per game
FG%	Field goal percentage	3P%	3-point field goal percentage	FT%	Free throw percentage
RPG	Rebounds per game	APG	Assists per game	SPG	Steals per game
BPG	Blocks per game	PPG	Points per game	**Bold**	Career high

=== NBA ===
==== Regular season ====
Year	Team	GP	MPG	FG%	3P%	FT%	RPG	APG	SPG	BPG	PPG
1975–76	Houston	32	8.9	.412		.720	**1.2**	.9	.6	**.2**	3.2
1976–77	Houston	**46**	8.0	.443		.600	.9	.8	.2	.0	2.4
1977–78	Houston	21	10.4	.365		.778	1.0	1.0	.4	.0	3.6
1979–80	Houston	9	11.8	**.542**	–	.769	1.0	.6	.6	.0	4.0
1980–81	Golden State	4	10.8	.500	–	**1.000**	.0	.5	**1.0**	.0	**5.5**
1980–81	Seattle	12	**13.8**	.298	.000	.917	.9	**1.5**	.4	.1	3.3
Career		124	9.6	.408	.000	.742	1.0	.9	.4	.1	3.1

==== Playoffs ====
Year	Team	GP	MPG	FG%	FT%	RPG	APG	SPG	BPG	PPG
1977	Houston	1	2.0	.333	–	1.0	.0	1.0	.0	2.0
