= 1976–77 Atlanta Hawks season =

Season of National Basketball Association team the Atlanta Hawks

- Head coach: Hubie Brown
- Arena: Omni Coliseum

Results
- Record: 31–51 (.378)
- Place: Division: 6th (Central); Conference: 9th (Eastern)
- Playoff finish: Did not qualify
- Stats at Basketball Reference

Local media
- Television: WTCG
- Radio: WSB

The 1976–77 Atlanta Hawks season was the Hawks' 28th season in the NBA and ninth season in Atlanta.

== Roster ==
1976–77 Atlanta Hawks roster
Players

Pos.	No.	Player	Height	Weight	DOB	From
C	41	Tom Barker	6 ft 11 in (2.11 m)	225 lb (102 kg)		Hawaiʻi
F	50	John Brown	6 ft 7 in (2.01 m)	220 lb (100 kg)		Missouri
G	44	Ken Charles	6 ft 3 in (1.91 m)	180 lb (82 kg)		Fordham
C	34	Randy Denton	6 ft 10 in (2.08 m)	240 lb (109 kg)		Duke
SG	13	Henry Dickerson	6 ft 4 in (1.93 m)	204 lb (93 kg)		College of Charleston
G	22	John Drew	6 ft 6 in (1.98 m)	205 lb (93 kg)		Gardner–Webb
C	10	Steve Hawes	6 ft 9 in (2.06 m)	220 lb (100 kg)		Washington
G	24	Armond Hill	6 ft 4 in (1.93 m)	190 lb (86 kg)		Princeton
G/F	23	Lou Hudson	6 ft 5 in (1.96 m)	210 lb (95 kg)		Minnesota
C	25	Joe C. Meriweather	6 ft 10 in (2.08 m)	215 lb (98 kg)		Southern Illinois
SG	45	Geoff Petrie (injured) (IN)	6 ft 4 in (1.93 m)	190 lb (86 kg)		Princeton
C	40	Mike Sojourner	6 ft 9 in (2.06 m)	225 lb (102 kg)		Utah
F	33	Leonard Robinson	6 ft 7 in (2.01 m)	225 lb (102 kg)		Tennessee State
G	12	Claude Terry	6 ft 5 in (1.96 m)	195 lb (88 kg)		Stanford

Coaches
Head coach
- Hubie Brown
Assistant(s)
- Frank Layden

Legend
- (DP) Unsigned draft pick
- (FA) Free agent
- (S) Suspended
- Injured

== Regular season ==
=== Season standings ===
Central Division	W	L	PCT	GB	Home	Road	Div
y-Houston Rockets	49	33	.598	–	34–7	15–26	13–7
x-Washington Bullets	48	34	.585	1	32–9	16–25	11–9
x-San Antonio Spurs	44	38	.537	5	31–10	13–28	9–11
x-Cleveland Cavaliers	43	39	.524	6	29–12	14–27	8–12
New Orleans Jazz	35	47	.427	14	26–15	9–32	10–10
Atlanta Hawks	31	51	.378	18	19–22	12–29	9–11

#	Eastern Conference				
#	Team	W	L	PCT	GB
1	z-Philadelphia 76ers	50	32	.610	–
2	y-Houston Rockets	49	33	.598	1
3	x-Washington Bullets	48	34	.585	2
4	x-Boston Celtics	44	38	.537	6
5	x-San Antonio Spurs	44	38	.537	6
6	x-Cleveland Cavaliers	43	39	.524	7
7	New York Knicks	40	42	.488	10
8	New Orleans Jazz	35	47	.427	15
9	Atlanta Hawks	31	51	.378	19
10	Buffalo Braves	30	52	.366	20
11	New York Nets	22	60	.268	28

z – clinched division title
y – clinched division title
x – clinched playoff spot
