= 1976–77 Cleveland Cavaliers season =

NBA professional basketball team season

- Head coach: Bill Fitch
- Arena: Coliseum at Richfield

Results
- Record: 43–39 (.524)
- Place: Division: 4th (Central); Conference: 6th (Eastern)
- Playoff finish: East First Round (eliminated 1–2)
- Stats at Basketball Reference

Local media
- Television: WJW-TV
- Radio: WWWE

The 1976–77 Cleveland Cavaliers season was the seventh season of the franchise in the National Basketball Association (NBA).

== Roster ==
1976–77 Cleveland Cavaliers roster
Players

Pos.	No.	Player	Height	Weight	DOB	From
PF	52	Jim Brewer	6 ft 9 in (2.06 m)	210 lb (95 kg)	1951-12-03	Minnesota
G	25	Gary Brokaw	6 ft 4 in (1.93 m)	178 lb (81 kg)	1954–01–11	Notre Dame
SG	34	Austin Carr	6 ft 4 in (1.93 m)	200 lb (91 kg)	1948-03-10	Notre Dame
C	22	Jim Chones	6 ft 11 in (2.11 m)	220 lb (100 kg)	1949-11-30	Marquette
PG	35	Jim Cleamons	6 ft 3 in (1.91 m)	185 lb (84 kg)	1949-09-13	Ohio State
PF	24	John Lambert	6 ft 10 in (2.08 m)	225 lb (102 kg)	1953-01-14	USC
SF	20	Campy Russell	6 ft 8 in (2.03 m)	215 lb (98 kg)	1952-01-12	Michigan
G/F	7	Bingo Smith	6 ft 5 in (1.96 m)	195 lb (88 kg)	1946-02-26	Tulsa
G/F	10	Dick Snyder	6 ft 5 in (1.96 m)	207 lb (94 kg)	1944-02-01	Davidson
C	42	Nate Thurmond	6 ft 11 in (2.11 m)	225 lb (102 kg)	1941-07-25	Bowling Green
PG	14	Foots Walker	6 ft 0 in (1.83 m)	184 lb (83 kg)	1951-05-21	West Georgia
G	15	Chuckie Williams	6 ft 3 in (1.91 m)	180 lb (82 kg)	1953–12–31	Kansas State

Coaches
Head coach
- Bill Fitch
Assistant(s)
- Jimmy Rodgers

Legend
- (DP) Unsigned draft pick
- (FA) Free agent
- (S) Suspended
- Injured

== Season standings ==
Central Division	W	L	PCT	GB	Home	Road	Div
y-Houston Rockets	49	33	.598	–	34–7	15–26	13–7
x-Washington Bullets	48	34	.585	1	32–9	16–25	11–9
x-San Antonio Spurs	44	38	.537	5	31–10	13–28	9–11
x-Cleveland Cavaliers	43	39	.524	6	29–12	14–27	8–12
New Orleans Jazz	35	47	.427	14	26–15	9–32	10–10
Atlanta Hawks	31	51	.378	18	19–22	12–29	9–11

#	Eastern Conference				
#	Team	W	L	PCT	GB
1	z-Philadelphia 76ers	50	32	.610	–
2	y-Houston Rockets	49	33	.598	1
3	x-Washington Bullets	48	34	.585	2
4	x-Boston Celtics	44	38	.537	6
5	x-San Antonio Spurs	44	38	.537	6
6	x-Cleveland Cavaliers	43	39	.524	7
7	New York Knicks	40	42	.488	10
8	New Orleans Jazz	35	47	.427	15
9	Atlanta Hawks	31	51	.378	19
10	Buffalo Braves	30	52	.366	20
11	New York Nets	22	60	.268	28

== Game log ==
1976–77 game log
Total: 43–39 (Home: 29–12; Road: 14–27)
October: 5–0 (home: 4–0; road: 1–0)

Game	Date	Team	Score	High points	High rebounds	High assists	Location Attendance	Record

November: 10–4 (home: 5–0; road: 5–4)

Game	Date	Team	Score	High points	High rebounds	High assists	Location Attendance	Record
9	November 7, 1976	@ Atlanta	L 97–107				The Omni; 2,750	8–1

December: 5–9 (home: 4–3; road: 1–6)

Game	Date	Team	Score	High points	High rebounds	High assists	Location Attendance	Record
25	December 11, 1976	Atlanta	L 94–95				Coliseum at Richfield; 12,739	16–9

January: 6–7 (home: 5–2; road: 1–5)

Game	Date	Team	Score	High points	High rebounds	High assists	Location Attendance	Record

February: 5–7 (home: 4–2; road: 1–5)

Game	Date	Team	Score	High points	High rebounds	High assists	Location Attendance	Record

March: 9–8 (home: 5–3; road: 4–5)

Game	Date	Team	Score	High points	High rebounds	High assists	Location Attendance	Record
59	March 2, 1977	@ Seattle	W 105-85	Austin Carr (25)	Jim Brewers (12)	Campy Russell (6)	Seattle Center Coliseum; 10,622	32–27
60	March 4, 1977	@ Portland	W 113-101	Campy Russell (26)	Elmore Smith (13)	Campy Russell (5)	Memorial Coliseum; 10,135	33–27
61	March 6, 1977	@ Los Angeles	L 99-104	Campy Russell (22)	Jim Brewer (11)	Foots Walker (5)	The Forum; 9,842	33–28
62	March 8, 1977	@ Golden State	L 102-112	Campy Russell (17)	Jim Brewer (11)	Gary Brokaw (6)	Oakland-Alameda County Coliseum Arena; 10,846	33–29
63	March 10, 1977	@ San Antonio	L 100-106	Austin Carr (14)	Jim Chones (11)	Bingo Smith (8)	HemisFair Arena; 9,924	33–30
64	March 13, 1977	@ Atlanta	W 115–113	Elmore Smith (30)	Elmore Smith (13)	Austin Carr (8)	Omni Coliseum; 10,525	34–30
65	March 15, 1977	Philadelphia	L 102-133	Jim Chones (22)	Jim Chones (14)	Foots Walker (4)	Coliseum at Richfield; 9,717	34–31
66	March 17, 1977	Houston	L 87-88	Bingo Smith (15)	Jim Brewer (10)	Jim Cleamons (5)	Coliseum at Richfield; 9,724	34–32
67	March 18, 1977	@ New York	W 101-88	Jim Chones (24)	Jim Chones (12)	Austin Carr (6)	Nassau Veterans Memorial Coliseum; 10,743	35–32
68	March 19, 1977	San Antonio	W 94-89	Jim Chones (23)	Jim Chones (9)	Foots Walker (7)	Coliseum at Richfield; 10,368	36–32
69	March 20, 1977	Buffalo	W 115-108	Austin Carr (22)	Jim Chones (14)	Foots Walker (11)	Coliseum at Richfield; 9,156	37–32
70	March 22, 1977	Seattle	W 108-104	Austin Carr (16)	Jim Brewer (15)	Austin Carr (7)	Coliseum at Richfield; 9,258	38–32
71	March 23, 1977	@ Washington	L 90-95	Dick Snyder (16)	Jim Chones (16)	Foots Walker (6)	Capital Centre; 7,629	38–33
72	March 24, 1977	New Orleans	L 87-92	Austin Carr (26)	Jim Chones (10)	Foots Walker (9)	Coliseum at Richfield; 11,626	38–34
73	March 26, 1977	Atlanta	W 99–94	Foots Walker (23)	Jim Brewer (7)	Foots Walker (10)	Coliseum at Richfield; 12,344	39–34
74	March 27, 1977	@ Chicago	L 90–95	Bingo Smith (22)	Jim Brewer (14)	Foots Walker (5)	Chicago Stadium; 9,271	39–35
75	March 29, 1977	Boston	W 110–82	Austin Carr (24)	Jim Brewer (10)	Gary Brokaw (5)	Coliseum at Richfield; 9,732	40–35

April: 3–4 (home: 2–2; road: 1–2)

Game	Date	Team	Score	High points	High rebounds	High assists	Location Attendance	Record

1976–77 schedule

== Playoffs ==
1977 playoff game log
First Round: 1–2 (home: 1–0; road: 0–2)

Game	Date	Team	Score	High points	High rebounds	High assists	Location Attendance	Series
1	April 13	@ Washington	L 100–109	Foots Walker (20)	Jim Brewer (12)	Gary Brokaw (5)	Capital Centre; 11,240	0–1
2	April 15	Washington	W 91–83	Campy Russell (22)	Jim Chones (12)	Foots Walker (6)	Richfield Coliseum; 19,545	1–1
3	April 17	@ Washington	L 98–104	Elmore Smith (20)	Jim Brewer (13)	Foots Walker (11)	Capital Centre; 10,488	1–2

1977 schedule

== Awards and records ==
- Jim Brewer, NBA All-Defensive Second Team
