= Bob Gross =

American basketball player

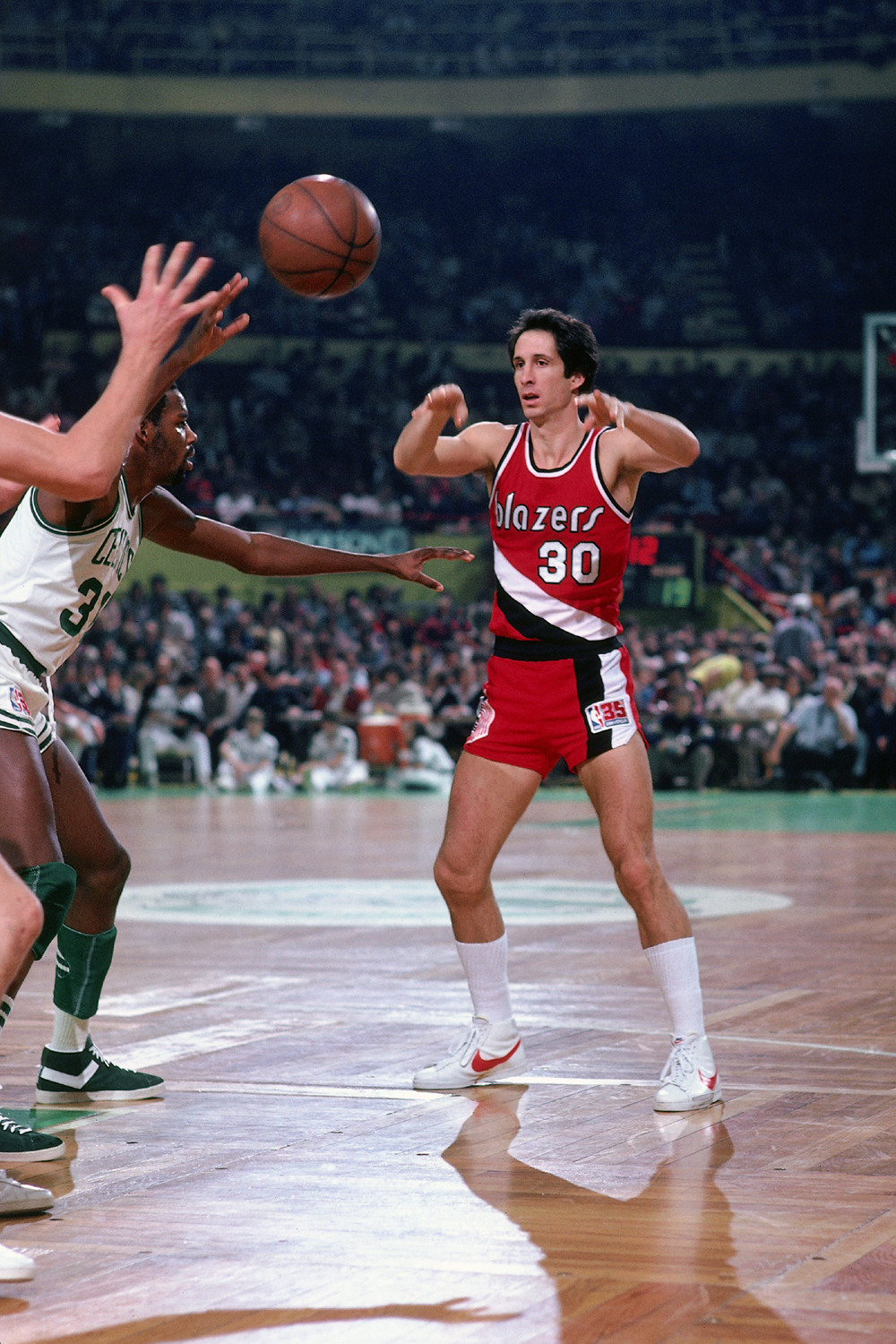
- Gross playing against the Boston Celtics on November 26, 1980

Personal information
- Born: August 3, 1953 (age 73) San Pedro, California, U.S.
- Listed height: 6 ft 6 in (1.98 m)
- Listed weight: 200 lb (91 kg)

Career information
- High school: Fermin Lasuen (San Pedro, California)
- College: Seattle (1971–1972); Long Beach State (1973–1975)
- NBA draft: 1975: 2nd round, 25th overall pick
- Drafted by: Portland Trail Blazers
- Playing career: 1975–1983
- Position: Small forward
- Number: 30

Career history
- 1975–1982: Portland Trail Blazers
- 1982–1983: San Diego Clippers

Career highlights
- NBA champion (1977); NBA All-Defensive Second Team (1978); No. 30 retired by Portland Trail Blazers; PCAA Player of the Year (1975); First-team All-PCAA (1975)

Career statistics
- Points: 4,567 (8.9 ppg)
- Rebounds: 2,253 (4.4 rpg)
- Assists: 1,481 (2.9 apg)
- Stats at NBA.com
- Stats at Basketball Reference

Robert Edwin Gross (born August 3, 1953) is an American former professional basketball player. A 6-foot-6-inch (1.98 m), 200 pounds (91 kg) forward, he attended Seattle University and California State University, Long Beach, and was selected in the 1975 NBA draft by the Portland Trail Blazers. He was also selected in the 1975 ABA Draft by the San Diego Sails. Gross was the starting small forward for the Blazers during their only championship season (1976–77). He left the NBA in 1983 with career averages of 8.9 points, 4.4 rebounds, 2.9 assists and 1.12 steals a game.

Currently living in the Portland area, Gross' number 30 jersey was retired on December 18, 2008, during the Trail Blazers' home game against the Phoenix Suns. Since his retirement from basketball, he has been in the construction business.

== Career statistics ==
Legend
| GP | Games played | GS | Games started | MPG | Minutes per game |
| FG% | Field goal percentage | 3P% | 3-point field goal percentage | FT% | Free throw percentage |
| RPG | Rebounds per game | APG | Assists per game | SPG | Steals per game |
| BPG | Blocks per game | PPG | Points per game | **Bold** | Career high |
| † | Won an NBA championship | * | Led the league |

=== NBA ===
==== Regular season ====
| Year | Team | GP | GS | MPG | FG% | 3P% | FT% | RPG | APG | SPG | BPG | PPG |
|---|---|---|---|---|---|---|---|---|---|---|---|---|
| 1975–76 | Portland | 76 | | 19.4 | .523 | | .683 | 4.0 | 2.1 | 1.2 | .6 | 6.8 |
| 1976–77† | Portland | **82** | | 27.2 | .529 | | **.851** | 4.8 | 3.0 | 1.3 | .7 | 11.4 |
| 1977–78 | Portland | 72 | | **30.0** | .529 | | .800 | **5.6** | 3.5 | **1.4** | .7 | **12.7** |
| 1978–79 | Portland | 53 | | 27.2 | .472 | | .807 | 4.7 | 3.5 | 1.3 | **.9** | 9.7 |
| 1979–80 | Portland | 62 | | 25.5 | .468 | .100 | .833 | 4.0 | **3.7** | 1.0 | .8 | 8.7 |
| 1980–81 | Portland | **82** | | 23.6 | .528 | .000 | .849 | 4.0 | 3.1 | 1.1 | .8 | 7.8 |
| 1981–82 | Portland | 59 | **24** | 23.3 | **.537** | '**.500** | .750 | 4.4 | 2.1 | 1.3 | .7 | 7.2 |
| 1982–83 | San Diego | 27 | 3 | 13.8 | .427 | .333 | .632 | 2.4 | 1.3 | .8 | .3 | 3.1 |
| Career | | 513 | 27 | 24.5 | .512 | .179 | .798 | 4.4 | 2.9 | 1.2 | .7 | 8.9 |

==== Playoffs ====
| Year | Team | GP | MPG | FG% | 3P% | FT% | RPG | APG | SPG | BPG | PPG |
|---|---|---|---|---|---|---|---|---|---|---|---|
| 1977† | Portland | **19*** | **30.7** | .591 | | .889 | **5.9** | **4.2** | **1.7** | **.8** | **14.1** |
| 1980 | Portland | 3 | 17.0 | .333 | | **1.000** | 1.3 | 1.3 | .3 | .0 | 4.0 |
| 1981 | Portland | 3 | 20.0 | **.643** | – | .643 | 2.7 | 1.7 | .7 | .7 | 9.0 |
| Career | | 25 | 27.8 | .584 | – | .851 | 5.0 | 3.6 | 1.4 | .7 | 12.3 |
