= 1976–77 Washington Bullets season =

NBA professional basketball team season

- Head coach: Dick Motta
- General manager: Bob Ferry
- Owner: Abe Pollin
- Arena: Capital Centre

Results
- Record: 48–34 (.585)
- Place: Division: 2nd (Central); Conference: 3rd (Eastern)
- Playoff finish: Conference Semi-finals (lost to Rockets 2–4)
- Stats at Basketball Reference

Local media
- Television: WDCA
- Radio: WTOP

The 1976–77 Washington Bullets season was the Bullets 16th season in the NBA and their 4th season in the city of Washington, D.C.

== Roster ==
1976–77 Washington Bullets roster
Players

Pos.	No.	Player	Height	Weight	DOB	From
SG	21	Dave Bing	6 ft 3 in (1.91 m)	180 lb (82 kg)	1943-11-24	Syracuse
SG	45	Phil Chenier	6 ft 3 in (1.91 m)	180 lb (82 kg)	1950-10-30	California
PF	12	Leonard Gray	6 ft 8 in (2.03 m)	240 lb (109 kg)	1951-12-19	Long Beach State
SF	35	Kevin Grevey	6 ft 5 in (1.96 m)	210 lb (95 kg)	1953-05-12	Kentucky
PF	11	Elvin Hayes	6 ft 9 in (2.06 m)	235 lb (107 kg)	1945-11-17	Houston
PG	14	Tom Henderson	6 ft 3 in (1.91 m)	190 lb (86 kg)	1952-01-26	Hawaiʻi
C	25	Mitch Kupchak	6 ft 9 in (2.06 m)	230 lb (104 kg)	1954-05-24	North Carolina
C	44	Joe Pace	6 ft 10 in (2.08 m)	220 lb (100 kg)	1953-12-18	Coppin State
SF	6	Mike Riordan	6 ft 4 in (1.93 m)	200 lb (91 kg)	1945-07-09	Providence
C	41	Wes Unseld	6 ft 7 in (2.01 m)	245 lb (111 kg)	1946-03-14	Louisville
PG	8	Bob Weiss	6 ft 3 in (1.91 m)	185 lb (84 kg)	1942-05-07	Penn State
PG	32	Larry Wright	6 ft 1 in (1.85 m)	160 lb (73 kg)	1954–11–23	Grambling State

Coaches
Head coach
- Dick Motta
Assistant(s)
- Bernie Bickerstaff

Legend
- (DP) Unsigned draft pick
- (FA) Free agent
- (S) Suspended
- Injured

Roster
Updated: January 20, 1977

== Regular season ==
=== Season standings ===
Central Division	W	L	PCT	GB	Home	Road	Div
y-Houston Rockets	49	33	.598	–	34–7	15–26	13–7
x-Washington Bullets	48	34	.585	1	32–9	16–25	11–9
x-San Antonio Spurs	44	38	.537	5	31–10	13–28	9–11
x-Cleveland Cavaliers	43	39	.524	6	29–12	14–27	8–12
New Orleans Jazz	35	47	.427	14	26–15	9–32	10–10
Atlanta Hawks	31	51	.378	18	19–22	12–29	9–11

#	Eastern Conference				
#	Team	W	L	PCT	GB
1	z-Philadelphia 76ers	50	32	.610	–
2	y-Houston Rockets	49	33	.598	1
3	x-Washington Bullets	48	34	.585	2
4	x-Boston Celtics	44	38	.537	6
5	x-San Antonio Spurs	44	38	.537	6
6	x-Cleveland Cavaliers	43	39	.524	7
7	New York Knicks	40	42	.488	10
8	New Orleans Jazz	35	47	.427	15
9	Atlanta Hawks	31	51	.378	19
10	Buffalo Braves	30	52	.366	20
11	New York Nets	22	60	.268	28

Notes

- z, y – division champions
- x – clinched playoff spot

== Game log ==
=== Regular season ===
1976–77 game log
Total: 48–34 (home: 32–9; road: 16–25)
October: 1–4 (home: 0–1; road: 1–3)

Game	Date	Team	Score	High points	High rebounds	High assists	Location Attendance	Record

November: 6–8 (home: 5–1; road: 1–7)

Game	Date	Team	Score	High points	High rebounds	High assists	Location Attendance	Record
17	November 27	@ Portland	L 95–103				Memorial Coliseum	7–10

December: 8–5 (home: 5–2; road: 3–3)

Game	Date	Team	Score	High points	High rebounds	High assists	Location Attendance	Record

January: 12–2 (home: 8–1; road: 4–1)

Game	Date	Team	Score	High points	High rebounds	High assists	Location Attendance	Record
40	January 15	Portland	W 113–107				Capital Centre	21–19

February: 9–5 (home: 5–1; road: 4–4)

Game	Date	Team	Score	High points	High rebounds	High assists	Location Attendance	Record
49	February 5	@ Portland	W 116–104				Memorial Coliseum	29–20
All-Star Break

March: 8–8 (home: 6–2; road: 2–6)

Game	Date	Team	Score	High points	High rebounds	High assists	Location Attendance	Record

April: 4–2 (home: 3–1; road: 1–1)

Game	Date	Team	Score	High points	High rebounds	High assists	Location Attendance	Record

1976–77 schedule

=== Playoffs ===
1977 playoff game log
Eastern Conference First Round: 2–1 (home: 2–0; road: 0–1)

Game	Date	Team	Score	High points	High rebounds	High assists	Location Attendance	Series
1	April 13	Cleveland	W 109–100	Phil Chenier (38)	Wes Unseld (16)	Tom Henderson (11)	Capital Centre; 11,240	1–0
2	April 15	@ Cleveland	L 83–91	Phil Chenier (24)	Elvin Hayes (23)	Wes Unseld (5)	Richfield Coliseum; 19,545	1–1
3	April 17	Cleveland	W 104–98	Tom Henderson (31)	Elvin Hayes (15)	Tom Henderson (6)	Capital Centre; 10,488	2–1

Eastern Conference Semifinals: 2–4 (home: 1–2; road: 1–2)

Game	Date	Team	Score	High points	High rebounds	High assists	Location Attendance	Series
1	April 19	@ Houston	W 111–101	Mitch Kupchak (32)	Mitch Kupchak (16)	Tom Henderson (8)	The Summit; 15,458	1–0
2	April 21	@ Houston	L 118–124 (OT)	Phil Chenier (37)	Elvin Hayes (15)	Tom Henderson (8)	The Summit; 15,676	1–1
3	April 24	Houston	W 93–90	Mitch Kupchak (23)	Hayes, Unseld (12)	Tom Henderson (6)	Capital Centre; 16,842	2–1
4	April 26	Houston	L 103–107	Phil Chenier (29)	Wes Unseld (15)	Tom Henderson (12)	Capital Centre; 19,035	2–2
5	April 29	@ Houston	L 115–123	Elvin Hayes (30)	Elvin Hayes (13)	Wes Unseld (6)	The Summit; 15,676	2–3
6	May 1	Houston	L 103–108	Phil Chenier (21)	Wes Unseld (16)	Tom Henderson (7)	Capital Centre; 12,393	2–4

1977 schedule

== Awards and records ==
- Elvin Hayes, All-NBA First Team
- Mitch Kupchak, NBA All-Rookie Team 1st Team
