= 1976–77 Houston Rockets season =

- Division champions
- Head coach: Tom Nissalke
- General manager: Ray Patterson
- Owner: Kenneth Schnitzer
- Arena: The Summit

Results
- Record: 49–33 (.598)
- Place: Division: 1st (Central); Conference: 2nd (Eastern)
- Playoff finish: Conference finals (lost to 76ers 2–4)
- Stats at Basketball Reference

Local media
- Television: KHTV
- Radio: KXYZ

The 1976–77 Houston Rockets season was the Rockets' 10th season in the NBA and 6th season in the city of Houston.

In the playoffs, the Rockets defeated the Washington Bullets in six games in the Semifinals before losing to the Philadelphia 76ers in six games in the conference finals.

Also, the Rockets radio broadcasts moved to KXYZ this season after five years on KPRC.

== Offseason ==
=== Draft picks ===
Round	Pick	Player	Position	Nationality	College
1	1	John Lucas (from Atlanta)^{[a]}	G	United States	Maryland
2	27	Phil Hicks	F	United States	Tulane

- ^{a 1} ^{2} On June 7, 1976, the Houston Rockets acquired Dwight Jones and the first pick from the Atlanta Hawks in exchange for Gus Bailey, Joe Meriweather and the ninth pick. The Rockets used the pick to draft John Lucas. The Hawks used the pick to draft Armond Hill.

== Roster ==
1976–77 Houston Rockets roster
Players

Pos.	No.	Player	Height	Weight	DOB	From
SF	27	John Johnson	6 ft 7 in (2.01 m)	200 lb (91 kg)	1947-10-18	Iowa
PF	13	Dwight Jones	6 ft 10 in (2.08 m)	210 lb (95 kg)	1952-02-27	Houston
SF	30	Goo Kennedy	6 ft 5 in (1.96 m)	205 lb (93 kg)	1949-08-23	TCU
C	44	Kevin Kunnert	6 ft 9 in (2.06 m)	230 lb (104 kg)	1951-11-11	Iowa
SG	15	John Lucas	6 ft 3 in (1.91 m)	175 lb (79 kg)	1953-10-31	Maryland
C	24	Moses Malone	6 ft 10 in (2.08 m)	235 lb (107 kg)	1955-03-23	Petersburg High School
PG	23	Calvin Murphy	5 ft 9 in (1.75 m)	165 lb (75 kg)	1948-05-09	Niagara
SG	14	Mike Newlin	6 ft 4 in (1.93 m)	200 lb (91 kg)	1949-01-02	Utah
F/C	25	Tom Owens	6 ft 10 in (2.08 m)	215 lb (98 kg)	1949–06–28	South Carolina
SF	42	Ed Ratleff	6 ft 6 in (1.98 m)	195 lb (88 kg)	1950-03-29	Long Beach State
PF	45	Rudy Tomjanovich	6 ft 8 in (2.03 m)	218 lb (99 kg)	1948-11-24	Michigan
SG	32	Rudy White	6 ft 2 in (1.88 m)	195 lb (88 kg)	1953-06-23	Arizona State

Coaches
Head coach
- Tom Nissalke
Assistant(s)
- Del Harris
- Larry Siegfried

Legend
- (DP) Unsigned draft pick
- (FA) Free agent
- (S) Suspended
- Injured

Roster
Updated: February 1, 1977

== Regular season ==
=== Season standings ===
Central Division	W	L	PCT	GB	Home	Road	Div
y-Houston Rockets	49	33	.598	–	34–7	15–26	13–7
x-Washington Bullets	48	34	.585	1	32–9	16–25	11–9
x-San Antonio Spurs	44	38	.537	5	31–10	13–28	9–11
x-Cleveland Cavaliers	43	39	.524	6	29–12	14–27	8–12
New Orleans Jazz	35	47	.427	14	26–15	9–32	10–10
Atlanta Hawks	31	51	.378	18	19–22	12–29	9–11

#	Eastern Conference				
#	Team	W	L	PCT	GB
1	z-Philadelphia 76ers	50	32	.610	–
2	y-Houston Rockets	49	33	.598	1
3	x-Washington Bullets	48	34	.585	2
4	x-Boston Celtics	44	38	.537	6
5	x-San Antonio Spurs	44	38	.537	6
6	x-Cleveland Cavaliers	43	39	.524	7
7	New York Knicks	40	42	.488	10
8	New Orleans Jazz	35	47	.427	15
9	Atlanta Hawks	31	51	.378	19
10	Buffalo Braves	30	52	.366	20
11	New York Nets	22	60	.268	28

z – clinched division title
y – clinched division title
x – clinched playoff spot

=== Game log ===
Game	Date	Opponent	Result	Record
1	October 21	@ Atlanta Hawks	W 120–104	1–0
2	October 23	vs. Phoenix Suns	W 129–126	2–0
3	October 27	vs. Philadelphia 76ers	L 94–116	2–1
4	October 30	Washington Bullets	W 105–92	3–1
5	November 3	Boston Celtics	W 117–111 (OT)	4–1
6	November 5	@ New York Nets	L 91–95	4–2
7	November 6	@ Buffalo Braves	L 102–117	4–3
8	November 9	@ Chicago Bulls	W 111–92	5–3
9	November 10	Seattle SuperSonics	W 99–97	6–3
10	November 12	@ Milwaukee Bucks	L 99–111	6–4
11	November 13	New York Nets	L 110–114	6–5
12	November 17	Buffalo Braves	W 120–114 (OT)	7–5
13	November 20	Kansas City Kings	W 127–126 (OT)	8–5
14	November 24	Golden State Warriors	W 113–107 (OT)	9–5
15	November 25	@ New Orleans Jazz	W 105–99	10–5
16	November 27	San Antonio Spurs	W 125–116	11–5
17	December 1	Detroit Pistons	W 110–104	12–5
18	December 2	Milwaukee Bucks	W 137–110	13–5
19	December 4	Indiana Pacers	W 120–108	14–5
20	December 8	@ Phoenix Suns	L 95–116	14–6
21	December 10	@ Los Angeles Lakers	L 99–109	14–7
22	December 11	@ Golden State Warriors	L 112–124	14–8
23	December 12	@ Seattle SuperSonics	W 96–92	15–8
24	December 14	@ Portland Trail Blazers	L 84–104	15–9
25	December 16	Atlanta Hawks	W 118–107	16–9
26	December 18	New Orleans Jazz	L 106–110	16–10
27	December 22	Washington Bullets	W 111–90	17–10
28	December 26	@ Indiana Pacers	W 93–79	18–10
29	December 28	@ New York Knicks	L 99–111	18–11
30	December 29	Philadelphia 76ers	W 93–91	19–11
31	January 1	@ Washington Bullets	L 89–104	19–12
32	January 2	@ Cleveland Cavaliers	L 80–104	19–13
33	January 5	New York Knicks	W 108–107	20–13
34	January 7	Denver Nuggets	L 107–117	20–14
35	January 8	@ Kansas City Kings	L 94–106	20–15
36	January 11	@ Boston Celtics	L 101–105	20–16
37	January 12	@ Philadelphia 76ers	L 97–102	20–17
38	January 14	@ Milwaukee Bucks	W 111–84	21–17
39	January 15	Los Angeles Lakers	W 122–116	22–17
40	January 18	Chicago Bulls	W 103–85	23–17
41	January 19	Boston Celtics	L 102–112	23–18
42	January 21	@ Detroit Pistons	L 86–109	23–19
43	January 22	Portland Trail Blazers	W 110–107	24–19
44	January 27	Detroit Pistons	W 114–107	25–19
45	January 28	Atlanta Hawks	W 118–104	26–19
46	January 29	@ Atlanta Hawks	L 97–101	26–20
47	February 3	@ New York Knicks	L 90–108	26–21
48	February 5	New York Knicks	W 105–103	27–21
49	February 6	@ New Orleans Jazz	L 90–99	27–22
50	February 8	Cleveland Cavaliers	W 97–81	28–22
51	February 9	Chicago Bulls	W 108–103	29–22
52	February 11	San Antonio Spurs	L 104–107	29–23
53	February 16	Seattle SuperSonics	W 124–95	30–23
54	February 17	@ San Antonio Spurs	W 113–99	31–23
55	February 19	@ Kansas City Kings	L 109–115	31–24
56	February 22	@ Denver Nuggets	L 106–118	31–25
57	February 24	@ Phoenix Suns	W 109–106	32–25
58	February 25	@ Portland Trail Blazers	W 123–106	33–25
59	February 27	@ Los Angeles Lakers	L 101–106	33–26
60	March 2	Los Angeles Lakers	W 120–113	34–26
61	March 5	Milwaukee Bucks	W 119–106	35–26
62	March 6	@ New York Nets	W 99–91	36–26
63	March 7	@ Buffalo Braves	W 128–107	37–26
64	March 9	Phoenix Suns	W 105–100	38–26
65	March 11	@ Indiana Pacers	W 124–109	39–26
66	March 12	New Orleans Jazz	W 120–104	40–26
67	March 16	New York Nets	W 100–86	41–26
68	March 17	@ Cleveland Cavaliers	W 88–87	42–26
69	March 18	@ Philadelphia 76ers	L 104–124	42–27
70	March 19	Buffalo Braves	W 110–104	43–27
71	March 22	Indiana Pacers	W 106–99	44–27
72	March 23	Portland Trail Blazers	W 109–104	45–27
73	March 24	@ San Antonio Spurs	L 112–118	45–28
74	March 26	Kansas City Kings	W 107–97	46–28
75	March 27	@ Detroit Pistons	L 100–115	46–29
76	March 29	@ Golden State Warriors	L 92–109	46–30
77	March 30	@ Seattle SuperSonics	L 105–111	46–31
78	April 1	@ Washington Bullets	W 91–85	47–31
79	April 2	Cleveland Cavaliers	W 106–93	48–31
80	April 6	@ Boston Celtics	W 104–93	49–31
81	April 8	@ Chicago Bulls	L 109–113	49–32
82	April 9	Denver Nuggets	L 110–118	49–33

== Playoffs ==
1977 playoff game log
Conference semifinals: 4–2 (home: 2–1; road: 2–1)

Game	Date	Team	Score	High points	High rebounds	High assists	Location Attendance	Series
1	April 19	Washington	L 101–111	Mike Newlin (24)	Moses Malone (10)	John Lucas (7)	The Summit; 15,458	0–1
2	April 21	Washington	W 124–118 (OT)	Moses Malone (31)	Moses Malone (26)	Mike Newlin (9)	The Summit; 15,676	1–1
3	April 24	@ Washington	L 90–93	Malone, Lucas (18)	Moses Malone (15)	John Lucas (8)	Capital Centre; 16,842	1–2
4	April 26	@ Washington	W 107–103	Rudy Tomjanovich (28)	Moses Malone (13)	Mike Newlin (7)	Capital Centre; 19,035	2–2
5	April 29	Washington	W 123–115	Calvin Murphy (40)	Moses Malone (22)	Mike Newlin (6)	The Summit; 15,676	3–2
6	May 1	@ Washington	W 108–103	Rudy Tomjanovich (26)	Moses Malone (14)	Calvin Murphy (9)	Capital Centre; 12,393	4–2

Conference finals: 2–4 (home: 1–2; road: 1–2)

Game	Date	Team	Score	High points	High rebounds	High assists	Location Attendance	Series
1	May 5	@ Philadelphia	L 117–128	Moses Malone (32)	Moses Malone (12)	Calvin Murphy (13)	Spectrum; 17,507	0–1
2	May 8	@ Philadelphia	L 97–106	Calvin Murphy (32)	Moses Malone (18)	Mike Newlin (11)	Spectrum; 14,855	0–2
3	May 11	Philadelphia	W 118–94	Moses Malone (30)	Moses Malone (25)	John Lucas (9)	The Summit; 15,676	1–2
4	May 13	Philadelphia	L 95–107	Rudy Tomjanovich (24)	Kevin Kunnert (17)	John Lucas (14)	The Summit; 15,676	1–3
5	May 15	@ Philadelphia	W 118–115	Tomjanovich, Lucas (21)	Moses Malone (19)	Calvin Murphy (10)	Spectrum; 18,276	2–3
6	May 17	Philadelphia	L 109–112	John Lucas (24)	Moses Malone (16)	Tomjanovich, Murphy (5)	The Summit; 15,676	2–4

1977 schedule

== Awards and records ==
- Tom Nissalke, NBA Coach of the Year Award
- Ray Patterson, NBA Executive of the Year Award
- John Lucas, NBA All-Rookie Team 1st Team
