= 1977 NBA playoffs =

1977 basketball tournament

Tournament details
- Dates: April 12–June 5, 1977
- Season: 1976–77
- Teams: 12

Final positions
- Champions: Portland Trail Blazers (1st title)
- Runners-up: Philadelphia 76ers
- Semifinalists: Los Angeles Lakers; Houston Rockets

The 1977 NBA playoffs was the postseason tournament of the National Basketball Association's 1976–77 season. The tournament concluded with the Western Conference champion Portland Trail Blazers defeating the Eastern Conference champion Philadelphia 76ers 4 games to 2 in the NBA Finals. It was Portland's first (and so far, only) NBA title. Bill Walton was named NBA Finals MVP.

Portland won the NBA title in its first playoff appearance, something that had not taken place since the early days of the BAA (and has not since, as of 2026). The Trail Blazers went 10-0 at home in the playoffs.

This was the first NBA playoffs after the ABA-NBA merger; two of the former ABA teams (the San Antonio Spurs and Denver Nuggets) made their playoff debuts in their first NBA season. The New Jersey Nets made their playoff debut in 1979, and the Indiana Pacers in 1981.

The NBA Playoffs added 1 more team from each conference, for a total of 12 contestants, up from 10 the previous year. Also, the two division winners in each conference were automatically given a first-round bye and started the playoffs in the conference semifinals.

This was the Detroit Pistons last playoff appearance of the decade and their last as a Western Conference team, as they would move to the East in 1978. They would not reach the postseason again until 1984.

After losing in the semifinals to Los Angeles, the Golden State Warriors wouldn't return to the playoffs again until 1987.

For the first time since 1956, the Eastern Conference Finals had neither the Celtics nor Knicks participating.

The referees went on strike during these playoffs. Two high-profile veterans, Richie Powers and Earl Strom, did not honor the strike and stayed on the job.

It was the first time since 1950 that the NBA Champion had to win 4 rounds.

== Bracket ==
First Round
E4	Boston	2
E5	San Antonio	0
E3	Washington	2
E6	Cleveland	1
W4	Golden State	2
W5	Detroit	1
W3	Portland	2
W6	Chicago	1

Conference Semifinals
E1	Philadelphia*	4
E4	Boston	3
Eastern Conference
E3	Washington	2
E2	Houston*	4
W1	Los Angeles*	4
W4	Golden State	3
Western Conference
W3	Portland	4
W2	Denver*	2

Conference Finals
E1	Philadelphia*	4
E2	Houston*	2
W1	Los Angeles*	0
W3	Portland	4

NBA Finals
E1	Philadelphia*	2
W3	Portland	4

- * Division winner
- Bold Series winner
- Italic Team with home-court advantage

== First round ==
=== Eastern Conference first round ===
==== (3) Washington Bullets vs. (6) Cleveland Cavaliers ====
April 13

Boxscore

Cleveland Cavaliers 100, Washington Bullets 109
Scoring by quarter: 20–23, 19–30, 20–31, 41–25
Pts: Foots Walker 20; Rebs: Jim Brewer 12; Asts: Gary Brokaw 5	Pts: Phil Chenier 38; Rebs: Wes Unseld 16; Asts: Tom Henderson 11
Washington leads series, 1–0

Capital Centre, Landover, Maryland
Attendance: 11,240

April 15

Boxscore

Washington Bullets 83, Cleveland Cavaliers 91
Scoring by quarter: 14–21, 23–18, 23–27, 23–25
Pts: Phil Chenier 24; Rebs: Elvin Hayes 23; Asts: Wes Unseld 5	Pts: Campy Russell 22; Rebs: Jim Chones 12; Asts: Foots Walker 6
Series tied, 1–1

Richfield Coliseum, Richfield, Ohio
Attendance: 19,545

- Nate Thurmond played for one minute and recorded a rebound off the bench in what was his final NBA game.

April 17

Boxscore

Cleveland Cavaliers 98, Washington Bullets 104
Scoring by quarter: 21–29, 26–27, 30–30, 21–18
Pts: Elmore Smith 20; Rebs: Jim Brewer 13; Asts: Foots Walker 11	Pts: Tom Henderson 31; Rebs: Elvin Hayes 15; Asts: Tom Henderson 6
Washington wins series, 2–1

Capital Centre, Landover, Maryland
Attendance: 10,488

This was the second playoff meeting between these two teams, with the Cavaliers winning the previous meeting.

Previous playoff series
Cleveland leads 1–0 in all-time playoff series

1976

Cleveland Cavaliers 4, Washington Bullets 3

1976 Eastern Conference Semifinals

==== (4) Boston Celtics vs. (5) San Antonio Spurs ====
April 12

Boxscore

San Antonio Spurs 94, Boston Celtics 104
Scoring by quarter: 26–26, 17–23, 26–24, 25–31
Pts: Kenon, Gervin 20 each Rebs: Billy Paultz 10; Asts: Louie Dampier 5	Pts: Jo Jo White 24; Rebs: Dave Cowens 13; Asts: Dave Cowens 7
Boston leads series, 1–0

Boston Garden, Boston, Massachusetts
Attendance: 13,505

April 15

Boxscore

Boston Celtics 113, San Antonio Spurs 109
Scoring by quarter: 25–24, 33–26, 32–31, 23–28
Pts: Jo Jo White 38; Rebs: Sidney Wicks 12; Asts: Cowens, Havlicek 9 each	Pts: George Gervin 30; Rebs: three players 7 each Asts: Mike Gale 7
Boston wins series, 2–0

HemisFair Arena, San Antonio, Texas
Attendance: 12,067

This was the first playoff meeting between these two teams.

=== Western Conference first round ===
==== (3) Portland Trail Blazers vs. (6) Chicago Bulls ====
April 12

Boxscore

Chicago Bulls 83, Portland Trail Blazers 96
Scoring by quarter: 19–29, 23–23, 26–21, 15–23
Pts: Mickey Johnson 19; Rebs: Artis Gilmore 14; Asts: Norm Van Lier 8	Pts: Maurice Lucas 29; Rebs: Bill Walton 9 Asts: Bill Walton 6
Portland leads series, 1–0

Memorial Coliseum, Portland, Oregon
Attendance: 12,774

April 15

Boxscore

Portland Trail Blazers 104, Chicago Bulls 107
Scoring by quarter: 24–24, 22–26, 31–29, 27–28
Pts: Bill Walton 24; Rebs: Bill Walton 17; Asts: Bob Gross 7	Pts: Mickey Johnson 29; Rebs: Mickey Johnson 15; Asts: Norm Van Lier 11
Series tied, 1–1

Chicago Stadium, Chicago, Illinois
Attendance: 20,000

April 17

Boxscore

Chicago Bulls 98, Portland Trail Blazers 106
Scoring by quarter: 21–27, 25–30, 29–23, 23–26
Pts: Mickey Johnson 34; Rebs: Johnson, Gilmore 14 each Asts: Norm Van Lier 10	Pts: Bob Gross 26; Rebs: Bill Walton 11; Asts: Lionel Hollins 9
Portland wins series, 2–1

Memorial Coliseum, Portland, Oregon
Attendance: 12,520

This was the first playoff meeting between these two teams.

==== (4) Golden State Warriors vs. (5) Detroit Pistons ====
April 12

Boxscore

Detroit Pistons 95, Golden State Warriors 90
Scoring by quarter: 24–29, 26–31, 23–18, 22–12
Pts: Bob Lanier 28; Rebs: Bob Lanier 17; Asts: Kevin Porter 6	Pts: Rick Barry 31; Rebs: Clifford Ray 16; Asts: Rick Barry 6
Detroit leads series, 1–0

Oakland–Alameda County Coliseum Arena, Oakland, California
Attendance: 12,459

April 14

Boxscore

Golden State Warriors 138, Detroit Pistons 108
Scoring by quarter: 34–33, 29–26, 36–25, 39–24
Pts: Phil Smith 35; Rebs: Parish, Ray 12 each Asts: Charles Dudley 14	Pts: Eric Money 31; Rebs: Bob Lanier 18; Asts: Eric Money 7
Series tied, 1–1

Cobo Arena, Detroit, Michigan
Attendance: 11,220

- This would be the last NBA playoff game in the city of Detroit until 2019.

April 17

Boxscore

Detroit Pistons 101, Golden State Warriors 109
Scoring by quarter: 35–25, 23–29, 18–28, 25–27
Pts: Bob Lanier 33; Rebs: Bob Lanier 15; Asts: Money, Porter 8 each	Pts: Rick Barry 35; Rebs: Robert Parish 18; Asts: Barry, Dudley 7 each
Golden State wins series, 2–1

Oakland–Alameda County Coliseum Arena, Oakland, California
Attendance: 13,155

This was the third playoff meeting between these two teams, with the Warriors winning both previous encounters. The April 17 game saw a fistfight between Eric Money of the Pistons and Charles Dudley of the Warriors in the third quarter that turned into a ten-minute melee between coaches and fans. The referees (filling in as replacements due to a strike between NBA referees) assessed personal fouls on Money and Dudley and continued play.

Previous playoff series
Golden State leads 2–0 in all-time playoff series

1956

Fort Wayne Pistons 1, Philadelphia Warriors 4

1956 NBA Finals

1976

Detroit Pistons 2, Golden State Warriors 4

1976 Western Conference Semifinals

== Conference semifinals ==
=== Eastern Conference semifinals ===
==== (1) Philadelphia 76ers vs. (4) Boston Celtics ====
April 17

Boxscore

Boston Celtics 113, Philadelphia 76ers 111
Scoring by quarter: 22–31, 37–36, 27–27, 27–17
Pts: Charlie Scott 22; Rebs: Dave Cowens 15; Asts: Charlie Scott 8	Pts: Julius Erving 36; Rebs: Caldwell Jones 11; Asts: Collins, Erving 5 each
Boston leads series, 1–0

Spectrum, Philadelphia, Pennsylvania
Attendance: 13,821

- Jo Jo White's buzzer-beater.

April 20

Boxscore

Boston Celtics 101, Philadelphia 76ers 113
Scoring by quarter: 22–34, 23–23, 30–27, 26–29
Pts: John Havlicek 31; Rebs: Dave Cowens 15; Asts: Jo Jo White 7	Pts: Julius Erving 30; Rebs: George McGinnis 13; Asts: Doug Collins 7
Series tied, 1–1

Spectrum, Philadelphia, Pennsylvania
Attendance: 18,276

April 22

Boxscore

Philadelphia 76ers 109, Boston Celtics 100
Scoring by quarter: 34–25, 22–20, 24–28, 29–27
Pts: Julius Erving 27; Rebs: McGinnis, Jones 15 each Asts: George McGinnis 5	Pts: John Havlicek 25; Rebs: Wicks, Cowens 8 each Asts: Jo Jo White 7
Philadelphia leads series, 2–1

Boston Garden, Boston, Massachusetts
Attendance: 15,040

April 24

Boxscore

Philadelphia 76ers 119, Boston Celtics 124
Scoring by quarter: 30–37, 21–28, 29–29, 39–30
Pts: Doug Collins 36; Rebs: George McGinnis 9 Asts: Doug Collins 5	Pts: Dave Cowens 37; Rebs: Dave Cowens 21; Asts: John Havlicek 15
Series tied, 2–2

Boston Garden, Boston, Massachusetts
Attendance: 15,040

April 27

Boxscore

Boston Celtics 91, Philadelphia 76ers 110
Scoring by quarter: 20–30, 24–32, 26–24, 21–24
Pts: Charlie Scott 20; Rebs: Curtis Rowe 16; Asts: Jo Jo White 7	Pts: Doug Collins 23; Rebs: McGinnis, Jones 11 each Asts: Doug Collins 6
Philadelphia leads series, 3–2

Spectrum, Philadelphia, Pennsylvania
Attendance: 18,276

April 29

Boxscore

Philadelphia 76ers 108, Boston Celtics 113
Scoring by quarter: 23–27, 25–30, 35–30, 25–26
Pts: Doug Collins 32; Rebs: George McGinnis 14; Asts: George McGinnis 5	Pts: Jo Jo White 40; Rebs: Dave Cowens 19; Asts: John Havlicek 6
Series tied, 3–3

Boston Garden, Boston, Massachusetts
Attendance: 15,040

May 1

Boxscore

Boston Celtics 77, Philadelphia 76ers 83
Scoring by quarter: 19–24, 26–26, 18–21, 14–12
Pts: Jo Jo White 17; Rebs: Dave Cowens 27; Asts: Charlie Scott 6	Pts: World B. Free 27; Rebs: George McGinnis 12; Asts: McGinnis, Mix 4 each
Philadelphia wins series, 4–3

Spectrum, Philadelphia, Pennsylvania
Attendance: 18,276

This was the 14th playoff meeting between these two teams, with the Celtics winning eight of the first 13 meetings.

Previous playoff series
Boston leads 8–5 in all-time playoff series

1953

Boston Celtics 2, Syracuse Nationals 0

1953 Eastern Division Semifinals

1954

Boston Celtics 0, Syracuse Nationals 2

1954 Eastern Division Round Robin semifinals

1954

Boston Celtics 0, Syracuse Nationals 2

1954 Eastern Division Finals

1955

Boston Celtics 1, Syracuse Nationals 3

1955 Eastern Division Finals

1956

Boston Celtics 1, Syracuse Nationals 2

1956 Eastern Division Semifinals

1957

Boston Celtics 3, Syracuse Nationals 0

1957 Eastern Division Finals

1959

Boston Celtics 4, Syracuse Nationals 3

1959 Eastern Division Finals

1961

Boston Celtics 4, Syracuse Nationals 1

1961 Eastern Division Finals

1965

Boston Celtics 4, Philadelphia 76ers 3

1965 Eastern Division Finals

1966

Boston Celtics 4, Philadelphia 76ers 1

1966 Eastern Division Finals

1967

Boston Celtics 1, Philadelphia 76ers 4

1967 Eastern Division Finals

1968

Boston Celtics 4, Philadelphia 76ers 3

1968 Eastern Division Finals

1969

Boston Celtics 4, Philadelphia 76ers 1

1969 Eastern Division Semifinals

==== (2) Houston Rockets vs. (3) Washington Bullets ====
April 19

Boxscore

Washington Bullets 111, Houston Rockets 101
Scoring by quarter: 13–26, 33–20, 37–31, 28–24
Pts: Mitch Kupchak 32; Rebs: Mitch Kupchak 16; Asts: Tom Henderson 8	Pts: Mike Newlin 24; Rebs: Moses Malone 10; Asts: John Lucas 7
Washington leads series, 1–0

The Summit, Houston, Texas
Attendance: 15,458

April 21

Boxscore

Washington Bullets 118, Houston Rockets 124 (OT)
Scoring by quarter: 25–24, 28–26, 26–32, 29–26, Overtime: 10–16
Pts: Phil Chenier 37; Rebs: Elvin Hayes 15; Asts: Tom Henderson 8	Pts: Moses Malone 31; Rebs: Moses Malone 26; Asts: Mike Newlin 9
Series tied, 1–1

The Summit, Houston, Texas
Attendance: 15,676

April 24

Boxscore

Houston Rockets 90, Washington Bullets 93
Scoring by quarter: 24–26, 26–21, 24–24, 16–22
Pts: Malone, Lucas 18 each Rebs: Moses Malone 15; Asts: John Lucas 8	Pts: Mitch Kupchak 23; Rebs: Hayes, Unseld 12 each Asts: Tom Henderson 6
Washington leads series, 2–1

Capital Centre, Landover, Maryland
Attendance: 16,842

April 26

Boxscore

Houston Rockets 107, Washington Bullets 103
Scoring by quarter: 25–24, 31–31, 27–26, 24–22
Pts: Rudy Tomjanovich 28; Rebs: Moses Malone 13; Asts: Mike Newlin 7	Pts: Phil Chenier 29; Rebs: Wes Unseld 15; Asts: Tom Henderson 12
Series tied, 2–2

Capital Centre, Landover, Maryland
Attendance: 19,035

April 29

Boxscore

Washington Bullets 115, Houston Rockets 123
Scoring by quarter: 24–28, 31–24, 26–40, 34–31
Pts: Elvin Hayes 30; Rebs: Elvin Hayes 13; Asts: Wes Unseld 6	Pts: Calvin Murphy 40; Rebs: Moses Malone 22; Asts: Mike Newlin 6
Houston leads series, 3–2

The Summit, Houston, Texas
Attendance: 15,676

May 1

Boxscore

Houston Rockets 108, Washington Bullets 103
Scoring by quarter: 28–35, 22–23, 26–19, 32–26
Pts: Rudy Tomjanovich 26; Rebs: Moses Malone 14; Asts: Calvin Murphy 9	Pts: Phil Chenier 21; Rebs: Wes Unseld 16; Asts: Tom Henderson 7
Houston wins series, 4–2

Capital Centre, Landover, Maryland
Attendance: 12,393

This was the first playoff meeting between these two teams.

=== Western Conference semifinals ===
==== (1) Los Angeles Lakers vs. (4) Golden State Warriors ====
April 20

Boxscore

Golden State Warriors 106, Los Angeles Lakers 115
Scoring by quarter: 26–28, 26–26, 30–33, 24–28
Pts: Rick Barry 40; Rebs: Clifford Ray 13; Asts: Charles Dudley 8	Pts: Kareem Abdul-Jabbar 27; Rebs: Kareem Abdul-Jabbar 16; Asts: Kareem Abdul-Jabbar 7
Los Angeles leads series, 1–0

The Forum, Inglewood, California
Attendance: 15,928

April 22

Boxscore

Golden State Warriors 86, Los Angeles Lakers 95
Scoring by quarter: 19–28, 11–14, 28–21, 28–32
Pts: Wilkes, Parish 16 each Rebs: Robert Parish 11; Asts: Rick Barry 6	Pts: Kareem Abdul-Jabbar 40; Rebs: Kareem Abdul-Jabbar 19; Asts: Cazzie Russell 7
Los Angeles leads series, 2–0

The Forum, Inglewood, California
Attendance: 17,505

April 24

Boxscore

Los Angeles Lakers 105, Golden State Warriors 109
Scoring by quarter: 29–17, 22–31, 27–28, 27–33
Pts: Kareem Abdul-Jabbar 28; Rebs: Abdul-Jabbar, Ford 14 each Asts: Abdul-Jabbar, Chaney 7 each	Pts: Rick Barry 40; Rebs: Clifford Ray 15; Asts: Charles Dudley 7
Los Angeles leads series, 2–1

Oakland–Alameda County Coliseum Arena, Oakland, California
Attendance: 13,155

April 26

Boxscore

Los Angeles Lakers 103, Golden State Warriors 114
Scoring by quarter: 23–27, 14–23, 33–38, 33–26
Pts: Kareem Abdul-Jabbar 41; Rebs: Kareem Abdul-Jabbar 18; Asts: Tom Abernethy 5	Pts: Jamaal Wilkes 27; Rebs: Clifford Ray 15; Asts: Charles Dudley 10
Series tied, 2–2

Oakland–Alameda County Coliseum Arena, Oakland, California
Attendance: 13,155

April 29

Boxscore

Golden State Warriors 105, Los Angeles Lakers 112
Scoring by quarter: 24–35, 34–29, 27–27, 20–21
Pts: Rick Barry 28; Rebs: Wilkes, Parish 13 each Asts: Charles Dudley 6	Pts: Kareem Abdul-Jabbar 45; Rebs: Kareem Abdul-Jabbar 18; Asts: Don Chaney 6
Los Angeles leads series, 3–2

The Forum, Inglewood, California
Attendance: 17,505

May 1

Boxscore

Los Angeles Lakers 106, Golden State Warriors 115
Scoring by quarter: 22–34, 30–28, 28–26, 26–27
Pts: Kareem Abdul-Jabbar 43; Rebs: Kareem Abdul-Jabbar 20; Asts: Lucius Allen 7	Pts: Rick Barry 27; Rebs: Clifford Ray 11; Asts: Charles Dudley 10
Series tied, 3–3

Oakland–Alameda County Coliseum Arena, Oakland, California
Attendance: 13,155

May 4

Boxscore

Golden State Warriors 84, Los Angeles Lakers 97
Scoring by quarter: 29–18, 17–30, 20–21, 18–28
Pts: Jamaal Wilkes 24; Rebs: Clifford Ray 14; Asts: Phil Smith 6	Pts: Kareem Abdul-Jabbar 36; Rebs: Kareem Abdul-Jabbar 26; Asts: Bo Lamar 6
Los Angeles wins series, 4–3

The Forum, Inglewood, California
Attendance: 17,505

This was the fifth playoff meeting between these two teams, with the Lakers winning three of the first four meetings.

Previous playoff series
Los Angeles leads 3–1 in all-time playoff series

1967

Los Angeles Lakers 0, San Francisco Warriors 3

1967 Western Division Semifinals

1968

Los Angeles Lakers 4, San Francisco Warriors 0

1968 Western Division Finals

1969

Los Angeles Lakers 4, San Francisco Warriors 2

1969 Western Division Semifinals

1973

Golden State Warriors 1, Los Angeles Lakers 4

1973 Western Conference Finals

==== (2) Denver Nuggets vs. (3) Portland Trail Blazers ====
April 20

Boxscore

Portland Trail Blazers 101, Denver Nuggets 100
Scoring by quarter: 23–25, 27–20, 27–26, 24–29
Pts: Maurice Lucas 23; Rebs: Maurice Lucas 13; Asts: Bill Walton 6	Pts: Dan Issel 28; Rebs: Paul Silas 11; Asts: Ted McClain 5
Portland leads series, 1–0

McNichols Sports Arena, Denver, Colorado
Attendance: 17,995

April 22

Boxscore

Portland Trail Blazers 110, Denver Nuggets 121
Scoring by quarter: 30–24, 21–28, 30–33, 29–36
Pts: Maurice Lucas 29; Rebs: Bill Walton 16; Asts: Bill Walton 10	Pts: Dan Issel 36; Rebs: Paul Silas 9 Asts: Jones, McClain 7 each
Series tied, 1–1

McNichols Sports Arena, Denver, Colorado
Attendance: 17,975

April 24

Boxscore

Denver Nuggets 106, Portland Trail Blazers 110
Scoring by quarter: 25–28, 23–26, 32–27, 26–29
Pts: David Thompson 40; Rebs: Jones, Issel 9 each Asts: Bobby Jones 5	Pts: Bill Walton 26; Rebs: Bill Walton 13; Asts: Walton, Twardzik 5 each
Portland leads series, 2–1

Memorial Coliseum, Portland, Oregon
Attendance: 12,736

April 26

Boxscore

Denver Nuggets 96, Portland Trail Blazers 105
Scoring by quarter: 24–32, 22–22, 30–24, 20–27
Pts: Mack Calvin 28; Rebs: Jones, Silas 8 each Asts: Paul Silas 4	Pts: Bob Gross 25; Rebs: Bill Walton 11; Asts: Bob Gross 6
Portland leads series, 3–1

Memorial Coliseum, Portland, Oregon
Attendance: 12,930

May 1

Boxscore

Portland Trail Blazers 105, Denver Nuggets 114 (OT)
Scoring by quarter: 20–27, 28–27, 29–29, 24–18, Overtime: 4–13
Pts: Lionel Hollins 19; Rebs: Walton, Gross 14 each Asts: Hollins, Gross 7 each	Pts: David Thompson 31; Rebs: Dan Issel 18; Asts: Jim Price 11
Portland leads series, 3–2

McNichols Sports Arena, Denver, Colorado
Attendance: 17,517

May 2

Boxscore

Denver Nuggets 92, Portland Trail Blazers 108
Scoring by quarter: 16–33, 29–29, 19–26, 28–20
Pts: David Thompson 17; Rebs: Marvin Webster 16; Asts: Ted McClain 7	Pts: Johnny Davis 25; Rebs: Bill Walton 12; Asts: Bill Walton 9
Portland wins series, 4–2

Memorial Coliseum, Portland, Oregon
Attendance: 12,924

This was the first playoff meeting between these two teams.

== Conference finals ==
=== Eastern Conference finals ===
==== (1) Philadelphia 76ers vs. (2) Houston Rockets ====
May 5

Boxscore

Houston Rockets 117, Philadelphia 76ers 128
Scoring by quarter: 30–35, 27–29, 26–36, 34–28
Pts: Moses Malone 32; Rebs: Moses Malone 12; Asts: Calvin Murphy 13	Pts: Julius Erving 24; Rebs: George McGinnis 13; Asts: Doug Collins 8
Philadelphia leads series, 1–0

Spectrum, Philadelphia, Pennsylvania
Attendance: 17,507

May 8

Boxscore

Houston Rockets 97, Philadelphia 76ers 106
Scoring by quarter: 24–29, 21–28, 32–23, 20–26
Pts: Calvin Murphy 32; Rebs: Moses Malone 18; Asts: Mike Newlin 11	Pts: George McGinnis 21; Rebs: George McGinnis 8 Asts: Julius Erving 10
Philadelphia leads series, 2–0

Spectrum, Philadelphia, Pennsylvania
Attendance: 14,855

May 11

Boxscore

Philadelphia 76ers 94, Houston Rockets 118
Scoring by quarter: 20–33, 21–26, 32–29, 21–30
Pts: Julius Erving 28; Rebs: George McGinnis 9 Asts: Doug Collins 7	Pts: Moses Malone 30; Rebs: Moses Malone 25; Asts: John Lucas 9
Philadelphia leads series, 2–1

The Summit, Houston, Texas
Attendance: 15,676

May 13

Boxscore

Philadelphia 76ers 107, Houston Rockets 95
Scoring by quarter: 22–26, 27–25, 27–23, 31–21
Pts: Doug Collins 36; Rebs: Caldwell Jones 11; Asts: George McGinnis 9	Pts: Rudy Tomjanovich 24; Rebs: Kevin Kunnert 17; Asts: John Lucas 14
Philadelphia leads series, 3–1

The Summit, Houston, Texas
Attendance: 15,676

May 15

Boxscore

Houston Rockets 118, Philadelphia 76ers 115
Scoring by quarter: 31–33, 28–30, 26–27, 33–25
Pts: Tomjanovich, Lucas 21 each Rebs: Moses Malone 19; Asts: Calvin Murphy 10	Pts: Julius Erving 37; Rebs: George McGinnis 14; Asts: Henry Bibby 8
Philadelphia leads series, 3–2

Spectrum, Philadelphia, Pennsylvania
Attendance: 18,276

May 17

Boxscore

Philadelphia 76ers 112, Houston Rockets 109
Scoring by quarter: 29–34, 27–24, 35–29, 21–22
Pts: Julius Erving 34; Rebs: Julius Erving 9 Asts: Julius Erving 6	Pts: John Lucas 24; Rebs: Moses Malone 16; Asts: Tomjanovich, Murphy 5 each
Philadelphia wins series, 4–2

The Summit, Houston, Texas
Attendance: 15,676

- Controversial charging foul on John Lucas wipes out game-tying field goal with 5 seconds left.

This was the first playoff meeting between these two teams.

=== Western Conference finals ===
==== (1) Los Angeles Lakers vs. (3) Portland Trail Blazers ====
May 6

Boxscore

Portland Trail Blazers 121, Los Angeles Lakers 109
Scoring by quarter: 33–22, 28–21, 27–31, 33–35
Pts: Maurice Lucas 28; Rebs: Maurice Lucas 15; Asts: three players 6 each	Pts: Earl Tatum 32; Rebs: Kareem Abdul-Jabbar 10; Asts: Abdul-Jabbar, Warner 5 each
Portland leads series, 1–0

The Forum, Inglewood, California
Attendance: 16,975

May 8

Boxscore

Portland Trail Blazers 99, Los Angeles Lakers 97
Scoring by quarter: 26–25, 28–26, 16–26, 29–20
Pts: Lionel Hollins 31; Rebs: Bill Walton 17; Asts: Lionel Hollins 9	Pts: Kareem Abdul-Jabbar 40; Rebs: Kareem Abdul-Jabbar 17; Asts: three players 6 each
Portland leads series, 2–0

The Forum, Inglewood, California
Attendance: 15,192

May 10

Boxscore

Los Angeles Lakers 97, Portland Trail Blazers 102
Scoring by quarter: 29–36, 24–18, 22–19, 22–29
Pts: Kareem Abdul-Jabbar 21; Rebs: Kareem Abdul-Jabbar 20; Asts: Kareem Abdul-Jabbar 7	Pts: Walton, Lucas 22 each Rebs: Bill Walton 15; Asts: Bill Walton 9
Portland leads series, 3–0

Memorial Coliseum, Portland, Oregon
Attendance: 12,926

- Bill Walton's famous dunk on Kareem Abdul-Jabbar.

May 13

Boxscore

Los Angeles Lakers 101, Portland Trail Blazers 105
Scoring by quarter: 25–31, 19–18, 29–30, 28–26
Pts: Kareem Abdul-Jabbar 30; Rebs: Kareem Abdul-Jabbar 17; Asts: Lucius Allen 6	Pts: Maurice Lucas 26; Rebs: Bill Walton 14; Asts: Walton, Gross 6 each
Portland wins series, 4–0

Memorial Coliseum, Portland, Oregon
Attendance: 12,904

This was the first playoff meeting between these two teams.

== NBA Finals: (E1) Philadelphia 76ers vs. (W3) Portland Trail Blazers ==
May 22

Boxscore

Portland Trail Blazers 101, Philadelphia 76ers 107
Scoring by quarter: 25–27, 28–28, 25–31, 23–21
Pts: Bill Walton 28; Rebs: Bill Walton 20; Asts: Hollins, Davis 6 each	Pts: Julius Erving 33; Rebs: Caldwell Jones 11; Asts: Doug Collins 6
Philadelphia leads series, 1–0

Spectrum, Philadelphia, Pennsylvania
Attendance: 18,276
Referees: Earl Strom, John Vanak

May 26

Boxscore

Portland Trail Blazers 89, Philadelphia 76ers 107
Scoring by quarter: 26–31, 17–30, 21–20, 25–26
Pts: Bill Walton 17; Rebs: Bill Walton 16; Asts: Bob Gross 4	Pts: Doug Collins 27; Rebs: Caldwell Jones 14; Asts: Henry Bibby 11
Philadelphia leads series, 2–0

Spectrum, Philadelphia, Pennsylvania
Attendance: 18,276
Referees: Joe Gushue, Richie Powers

- Notable for a brawl between the Blazers' Maurice Lucas and the 76ers' Darryl Dawkins.

May 29

Boxscore

Philadelphia 76ers 107, Portland Trail Blazers 129
Scoring by quarter: 21–34, 32–26, 29–27, 25–42
Pts: Julius Erving 28; Rebs: George McGinnis 12; Asts: Julius Erving 5	Pts: Maurice Lucas 27; Rebs: Bill Walton 18; Asts: Bill Walton 9
Philadelphia leads series, 2–1

Memorial Coliseum, Portland, Oregon
Attendance: 12,923
Referees: Jake O'Donnell, Darell Garretson

- Bill Walton's two famous plays of tipping the ball against Darryl Dawkins off an alley-oop from Bob Gross, then dunking the ball off of Dave Twardzik's steal and alley-oop pass.

May 31

Boxscore

Philadelphia 76ers 98, Portland Trail Blazers 130
Scoring by quarter: 16–29, 30–28, 21–41, 31–32
Pts: Julius Erving 24; Rebs: Darryl Dawkins 11; Asts: Steve Mix 4	Pts: Lionel Hollins 25; Rebs: Bill Walton 13; Asts: Bill Walton 7
Series tied, 2–2

Memorial Coliseum, Portland, Oregon
Attendance: 12,913
Referees: Manny Sokol, Don Murphy

June 3

Boxscore

Portland Trail Blazers 110, Philadelphia 76ers 104
Scoring by quarter: 22–15, 23–26, 40–25, 25–38
Pts: Bob Gross 25; Rebs: Bill Walton 24; Asts: Johnny Davis 8	Pts: Julius Erving 37; Rebs: Caldwell Jones 13; Asts: Julius Erving 7
Portland leads series, 3–2

Spectrum, Philadelphia, Pennsylvania
Attendance: 18,276
Referees: Earl Strom, Darell Garretson

June 5

Boxscore

Philadelphia 76ers 107, Portland Trail Blazers 109
Scoring by quarter: 27–27, 28–40, 27–24, 25–18
Pts: Julius Erving 40; Rebs: George McGinnis 16; Asts: Julius Erving 8	Pts: Hollins, Walton 20 each Rebs: Bill Walton 23; Asts: Bill Walton 7
Portland wins series, 4–2

Memorial Coliseum, Portland, Oregon
Attendance: 12,951
Referees: Richie Powers, Jake O'Donnell

- Portland becomes the second team in finals history, after the 1969 Celtics, to overcome a 2–0 series deficit.

This was the first playoff meeting between these two teams.
