= Henry Ward (basketball) =

American basketball player (born 1952)

Personal information
- Born: January 30, 1952 (age 74) Jackson, Mississippi, U.S.
- Listed height: 6 ft 4 in (1.93 m)
- Listed weight: 195 lb (88 kg)

Career information
- College: Jackson State (1972–1975)
- NBA draft: 1975: 6th round, 99th overall pick
- Drafted by: Cleveland Cavaliers
- Playing career: 1975–1978
- Position: Shooting guard
- Number: 15

Career history
- 1975–1977: San Antonio Spurs
- 1977–1978: Brill Cagliari

Career NBA statistics
- Points: 413 (4.7 ppg)
- Rebounds: 173 (2.0 rpg)
- Assists: 41 (0.5 apg)
- Stats at NBA.com
- Stats at Basketball Reference

Henry Lorette Ward (born January 30, 1952) is an American former professional basketball player. He played for the San Antonio Spurs in 1975–76 while they were in the American Basketball Association and then the following season when they had moved to the National Basketball Association. Ward then played for Olimpia Cagliari in Italy during the 1977–78 season.
