= Eastern Conference (NBA) =

Conference of the National Basketball Association

- Current season, competition or edition: 2026-2027
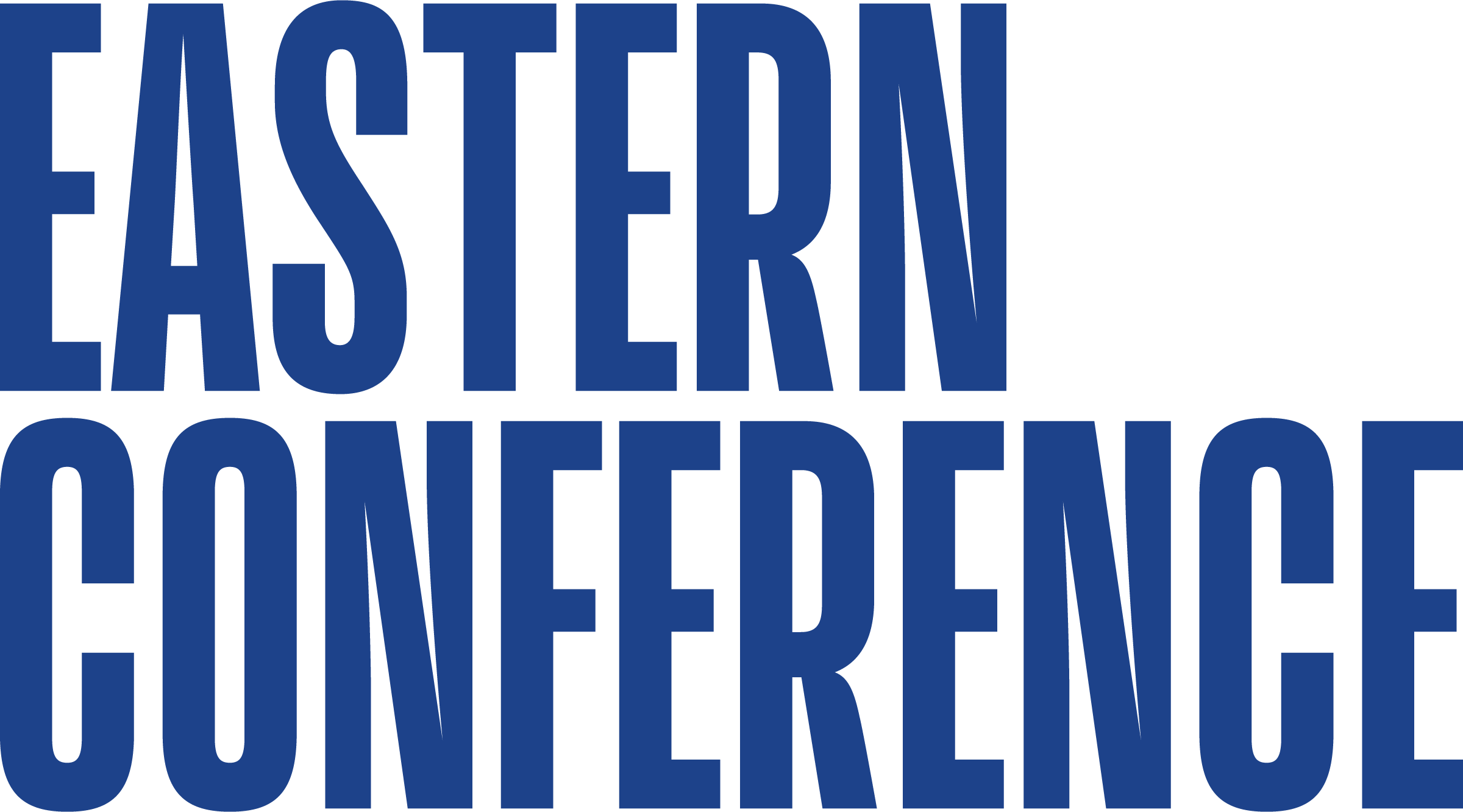
- Formerly: Eastern Division
- League: National Basketball Association
- Sport: Basketball
- Founded: 1970
- Divisions: 3
- No. of teams: 15
- Countries: United States (14 teams); Canada (1 team)
- Most recent champions: New York Knicks (5th title) (2025-2026)
- Most titles: Boston Celtics (16 titles)

The Eastern Conference is one of two conferences that make up the National Basketball Association (NBA), the other being the Western Conference. Both conferences consist of 15 teams organized into three divisions. The Eastern Conference comprises the Atlantic, Central, and Southeast Divisions.

The current divisional alignment was adopted at the start of the 2004–05 season, when the now Charlotte Hornets began play as the Bobcats, NBA's 30th franchise. This necessitated the move of the New Orleans Hornets (now Pelicans) from the Eastern Conference's Central Division to the newly created Southwest Division of the Western Conference.

The NBA first started awarding an Eastern Conference championship trophy during the 2000–01 season, renaming it after Hall of Famer Bob Cousy in the 2021–22 season. In 2021–22, the league began awarding the Larry Bird Trophy to the Eastern Conference Finals Most Valuable Player, named after Hall of Famer Larry Bird.

== 2026–27 standings ==
Eastern Conference
#	Team	W	L	PCT	GB	GP
1	Philadelphia 76ers *	2	0	1.000	–	2
2	Indiana Pacers *	1	0	1.000	0.5	1
3	Detroit Pistons	1	0	1.000	0.5	1
4	Atlanta Hawks *	1	0	1.000	0.5	1
5	Toronto Raptors	1	0	1.000	0.5	1
6	Washington Wizards	1	0	1.000	0.5	1
7	Charlotte Hornets	1	0	1.000	0.5	1
8	Cleveland Cavaliers	0	1	.000	1.5	1
9	New York Knicks	0	1	.000	1.5	1
10	Brooklyn Nets	0	1	.000	1.5	1
11	Orlando Magic	0	1	.000	1.5	1
12	Boston Celtics	0	1	.000	1.5	1
13	Milwaukee Bucks	0	1	.000	1.5	1
14	Chicago Bulls	0	1	.000	1.5	1
15	Miami Heat	0	1	.000	1.5	1

Notes

- * – Division leader

== Teams ==
Team	Division	Location	Year	From
Team	Division	Location	Joined	
Atlanta Hawks	Southeast	Atlanta, Georgia	1970–present	Western Division
Boston Celtics	Atlantic	Boston, Massachusetts	1970–present	Eastern Division
Brooklyn Nets	Atlantic	Brooklyn, New York	1976–present	ABA‡
Charlotte Hornets	Southeast	Charlotte, North Carolina	1988–2002; 2004–present	—†
Chicago Bulls	Central	Chicago, Illinois	1980–present	Western Conference
Cleveland Cavaliers	Central	Cleveland, Ohio	1970–present	—†
Detroit Pistons	Central	Detroit, Michigan	1978–present	Western Conference
Indiana Pacers	Central	Indianapolis, Indiana	1979–present	Western Conference
Miami Heat	Southeast	Miami, Florida	1989–present	Western Conference
Milwaukee Bucks	Central	Milwaukee, Wisconsin	1980–present	Western Conference
New York Knicks	Atlantic	New York City, New York	1970–present	Eastern Division
Orlando Magic	Southeast	Orlando, Florida	1989–1990; 1991–present	—†; Western Conference
Philadelphia 76ers	Atlantic	Philadelphia, Pennsylvania	1970–present	Eastern Division
Toronto Raptors	Atlantic	Toronto, Ontario	1995–present	—†
Washington Wizards	Southeast	Washington, D.C.	1970–present	Western Division

=== Former teams ===
Team	Location	Year	From	Year	To	Current conference
Team	Location	Joined		Left		Current conference
Buffalo Braves (now the Los Angeles Clippers)	Buffalo, New York	1970	—†	1978	Western Conference	Western Conference
Cincinnati Royals (now the Sacramento Kings)	Cincinnati, Ohio	1970	Western Division	1972	Western Conference	Western Conference
Houston Rockets	Houston, Texas	1972	Western Conference	1980	Western Conference	Western Conference
New Orleans Jazz (now the Utah Jazz)	New Orleans, Louisiana	1974	—†	1979	Western Conference	Western Conference
New Orleans Hornets (now the New Orleans Pelicans)	New Orleans, Louisiana	2002	—†	2004	Western Conference	Western Conference
San Antonio Spurs	San Antonio, Texas	1976	ABA‡	1980	Western Conference	Western Conference

Notes

- † denotes an expansion team.
- ‡ denotes a team that merged from the American Basketball Association (ABA).

=== Team timeline ===
Denotes team that is currently in the conference
Denotes team that has left the conference

== Conference champions ==
**Bold**	Winning team of the NBA Finals
^	Had or tied for the best regular season record for that season

Season	Team	Record	Finals result
1970–71	Baltimore Bullets	42–40	Lost NBA Finals 0–4
1971–72	New York Knicks	48–34	Lost NBA Finals 1–4
1972–73	**New York Knicks**	57–25	Won NBA Finals 4–1
1973–74	**Boston Celtics**	56–26	Won NBA Finals 4–3
1974–75	Washington Bullets	60–22^	Lost NBA Finals 0–4
1975–76	**Boston Celtics**	54–28	Won NBA Finals 4–2
1976–77	Philadelphia 76ers	50–32	Lost NBA Finals 2–4
1977–78	**Washington Bullets**	44–38	Won NBA Finals 4–3
1978–79	Washington Bullets	54–28^	Lost NBA Finals 1–4
1979–80	Philadelphia 76ers	59–23	Lost NBA Finals 2–4
1980–81	**Boston Celtics**	62–20^	Won NBA Finals 4–2
1981–82	Philadelphia 76ers	58–24	Lost NBA Finals 2–4
1982–83	**Philadelphia 76ers**	65–17^	Won NBA Finals 4–0
1983–84	**Boston Celtics**	62–20^	Won NBA Finals 4–3
1984–85	Boston Celtics	63–19^	Lost NBA Finals 2–4
1985–86	**Boston Celtics**	67–15^	Won NBA Finals 4–2
1986–87	Boston Celtics	59–23	Lost NBA Finals 2–4
1987–88	Detroit Pistons	54–28	Lost NBA Finals 3–4
1988–89	**Detroit Pistons**	63–19^	Won NBA Finals 4–0
1989–90	**Detroit Pistons**	59–23	Won NBA Finals 4–1
1990–91	**Chicago Bulls**	61–21	Won NBA Finals 4–1
1991–92	**Chicago Bulls**	67–15^	Won NBA Finals 4–2
1992–93	**Chicago Bulls**	57–25	Won NBA Finals 4–2
1993–94	New York Knicks	57–25	Lost NBA Finals 3–4
1994–95	Orlando Magic	57–25	Lost NBA Finals 0–4
1995–96	**Chicago Bulls**	72–10^	Won NBA Finals 4–2
1996–97	**Chicago Bulls**	69–13^	Won NBA Finals 4–2
1997–98	**Chicago Bulls**	62–20^	Won NBA Finals 4–2
1998–99	New York Knicks	27–23	Lost NBA Finals 1–4
1999–2000	Indiana Pacers	56–26	Lost NBA Finals 2–4
2000–01	Philadelphia 76ers	56–26	Lost NBA Finals 1–4
2001–02	New Jersey Nets	52–30	Lost NBA Finals 0–4
2002–03	New Jersey Nets	49–33	Lost NBA Finals 2–4
2003–04	**Detroit Pistons**	54–28	Won NBA Finals 4–1
2004–05	Detroit Pistons	54–28	Lost NBA Finals 3–4
2005–06	**Miami Heat**	52–30	Won NBA Finals 4–2
2006–07	Cleveland Cavaliers	50–32	Lost NBA Finals 0–4
2007–08	**Boston Celtics**	66–16^	Won NBA Finals 4–2
2008–09	Orlando Magic	59–23	Lost NBA Finals 1–4
2009–10	Boston Celtics	50–32	Lost NBA Finals 3–4
2010–11	Miami Heat	58–24	Lost NBA Finals 2–4
2011–12	**Miami Heat**	46–20	Won NBA Finals 4–1
2012–13	**Miami Heat**	66–16^	Won NBA Finals 4–3
2013–14	Miami Heat	54–28	Lost NBA Finals 1–4
2014–15	Cleveland Cavaliers	53–29	Lost NBA Finals 2–4
2015–16	**Cleveland Cavaliers**	57–25	Won NBA Finals 4–3
2016–17	Cleveland Cavaliers	51–31	Lost NBA Finals 1–4
2017–18	Cleveland Cavaliers	50–32	Lost NBA Finals 0–4
2018–19	**Toronto Raptors**	58–24	Won NBA Finals 4–2
2019–20	Miami Heat	44–29	Lost NBA Finals 2–4
2020–21	**Milwaukee Bucks**	46–26	Won NBA Finals 4–2
2021–22	Boston Celtics	51–31	Lost NBA Finals 2–4
2022–23	Miami Heat	44–38	Lost NBA Finals 1–4
2023–24	**Boston Celtics**	64–18^	Won NBA Finals 4–1
2024–25	Indiana Pacers	50–32	Lost NBA Finals 3–4
2025–26	**New York Knicks**	53–29	Won NBA Finals 4–1

== Conference championships by team ==
Team	Championships won	Last
Boston Celtics	11	2024
Miami Heat	7	2023
Chicago Bulls	6	1998
Cleveland Cavaliers	5	2018
Detroit Pistons	5	2005
New York Knicks	5	2026
Philadelphia 76ers	5	2001
Baltimore/Washington Bullets/Wizards	4	1979
Indiana Pacers	2	2025
New Jersey/Brooklyn Nets	2	2003
Orlando Magic	2	2009
Milwaukee Bucks	1	2021
Toronto Raptors	1	2019
Atlanta Hawks	0	N/A
Charlotte Hornets	0	N/A

== Season results ==
Legend
^	Denotes team that won the NBA Finals
^{+}	Denotes team that won the Conference Finals, but lost the NBA Finals
*	Denotes team that qualified for the NBA playoffs
×	Denotes team that qualified for the NBA play-in tournament

1970–1980 seasons

Season	Team (record)														
Season	1st	2nd	3rd	4th	5th	6th	7th	8th	9th	10th	11th	12th	13th	14th	15th
1970–71	NYK* (52–30)	BAL^{+} (42–40)	PHI* (47–35)	ATL* (36–46)	BOS (44–38)	CIN (33–49)	BUF (22–60)	CLE (15–67)	—N/a	—N/a	—N/a	—N/a	—N/a	—N/a	—N/a
1971–72	BOS* (56–26)	BAL* (38–44)	NYK^{+} (48–34)	ATL* (36–46)	CIN (30–52)	PHI (30–52)	CLE (23–59)	BUF (22–60)	—N/a	—N/a	—N/a	—N/a	—N/a	—N/a	—N/a
1972–73	BOS* (68–14)	BAL* (52–30)	NYK^ (57–25)	ATL* (46–36)	HOU (33–49)	CLE (32–50)	BUF (21–61)	PHI (9–73)	—N/a	—N/a	—N/a	—N/a	—N/a	—N/a	—N/a
1973–74	BOS^ (56–26)	CAP* (47–35)	NYK* (49–33)	BUF* (42–40)	ATL (35–47)	HOU (32–50)	CLE (29–53)	PHI (25–57)	—N/a	—N/a	—N/a	—N/a	—N/a	—N/a	—N/a
1974–75	BOS* (60–22)	WAS^{+} (60–22)	BUF* (49–33)	HOU* (41–41)	NYK* (40–42)	CLE (40–42)	PHI (34–48)	ATL (31–51)	NOJ (23–59)	—N/a	—N/a	—N/a	—N/a	—N/a	—N/a
1975–76	BOS^ (54–28)	CLE* (49–33)	WAS* (48–34)	PHI* (46–36)	BUF* (46–36)	HOU (40–42)	NYK (38–44)	NOJ (38–44)	ATL (29–53)	—N/a	—N/a	—N/a	—N/a	—N/a	—N/a
1976–77	PHI^{+} (50–32)	HOU* (49–33)	WAS* (48–34)	BOS* (44–38)	SAS* (44–38)	CLE* (43–39)	NYK (40–42)	NOJ (35–47)	ATL (31–51)	BUF (30–52)	NYN (22–60)	—N/a	—N/a	—N/a	—N/a
1977–78	PHI* (55–27)	SAS* (52–30)	WAS^ (44–38)	CLE* (43–39)	NYK* (43–39)	ATL* (41–41)	NOJ (39–43)	BOS (32–50)	HOU (28–54)	BUF (27–55)	NJN (24–58)	—N/a	—N/a	—N/a	—N/a
1978–79	WAS^{+} (54–28)	SAS* (48–34)	PHI* (47–35)	HOU* (47–35)	ATL* (46–36)	NJN* (37–45)	NYK (31–51)	DET (30–52)	CLE (30–52)	BOS (29–53)	NOJ (26–56)	—N/a	—N/a	—N/a	—N/a
1979–80	BOS* (61–21)	ATL* (50–32)	PHI^{+} (59–23)	HOU* (41–41)	SAS* (41–41)	WAS* (39–43)	NYK (39–43)	IND (37–45)	CLE (37–45)	NJN (34–48)	DET (16–66)	—N/a	—N/a	—N/a	—N/a

1980–1990 seasons

Season	Team (record)														
Season	1st	2nd	3rd	4th	5th	6th	7th	8th	9th	10th	11th	12th	13th	14th	15th
1980–81	BOS^ (62–20)	MIL* (60–22)	PHI* (62–20)	NYK* (50–32)	CHI* (45–37)	IND* (44–38)	WAS (39–43)	ATL (31–51)	CLE (28–54)	NJN (24–58)	DET (21–61)	—N/a	—N/a	—N/a	—N/a
1981–82	BOS* (63–19)	MIL* (55–27)	PHI^{+} (58–24)	NJN* (44–38)	WAS* (43–39)	ATL* (42–40)	DET (39–43)	IND (35–47)	CHI (34–48)	NYK (33–49)	CLE (15–67)	—N/a	—N/a	—N/a	—N/a
1982–83	PHI^ (65–17)	MIL* (51–31)	BOS* (56–26)	NJN* (49–33)	NYK* (44–38)	ATL* (43–39)	WAS (42–40)	DET (37–45)	CHI (28–54)	CLE (23–59)	IND (20–62)	—N/a	—N/a	—N/a	—N/a
1983–84	BOS^ (62–20)	MIL* (50–32)	PHI* (52–30)	DET* (49–33)	NYK* (47–35)	NJN* (45–37)	ATL* (40–42)	WAS* (35–47)	CLE (28–54)	CHI (27–55)	IND (26–56)	—N/a	—N/a	—N/a	—N/a
1984–85	BOS^{+} (63–19)	MIL* (59–23)	PHI* (58–24)	DET* (46–36)	NJN* (42–40)	WAS* (40–42)	CHI* (38–44)	CLE* (36–46)	ATL (34–48)	NYK (24–58)	IND (22–60)	—N/a	—N/a	—N/a	—N/a
1985–86	BOS^ (67–15)	MIL* (57–25)	PHI* (54–28)	ATL* (50–32)	DET* (46–36)	WAS* (39–43)	NJN* (39–43)	CHI* (30–52)	CLE (29–53)	IND (26–56)	NYK (23–59)	—N/a	—N/a	—N/a	—N/a
1986–87	BOS^{+} (59–23)	ATL* (57–25)	DET* (52–30)	MIL* (50–32)	PHI* (45–37)	WAS* (42–40)	IND* (41–41)	CHI* (40–42)	CLE (31–51)	NJN (24–58)	NYK (24–58)	—N/a	—N/a	—N/a	—N/a
1987–88	BOS* (57–25)	DET^{+} (54–28)	CHI* (50–32)	ATL* (50–32)	MIL* (42–40)	CLE* (42–40)	WAS* (38–44)	NYK* (38–44)	IND (38–44)	PHI (36–46)	NJN (19–63)	—N/a	—N/a	—N/a	—N/a
1988–89	DET^ (63–19)	NYK* (52–30)	CLE* (57–25)	ATL* (52–30)	MIL* (49–33)	CHI* (47–35)	PHI* (46–36)	BOS* (42–40)	WAS (40–42)	IND (28–54)	NJN (26–56)	CHA (20–62)	—N/a	—N/a	—N/a
1989–90	DET^ (59–23)	PHI* (53–29)	CHI* (55–27)	BOS* (52–30)	NYK* (45–37)	MIL* (44–38)	CLE* (42–40)	IND* (42–40)	ATL (41–41)	WAS (31–51)	MIA (18–64)	ORL (18–64)	NJN (17–65)	—N/a	—N/a

1990–2000 seasons

Season	Team (record)														
Season	1st	2nd	3rd	4th	5th	6th	7th	8th	9th	10th	11th	12th	13th	14th	15th
1990–91	CHI^ (61–21)	BOS* (56–26)	DET* (50–32)	MIL* (48–34)	PHI* (44–38)	ATL* (43–39)	IND* (41–41)	NYK* (39–43)	CLE (33–49)	WAS (30–52)	NJN (26–56)	CHA (26–56)	MIA (24–58)	—N/a	—N/a
1991–92	CHI^ (67–15)	BOS* (51–31)	CLE* (57–25)	NYK* (51–31)	DET* (48–34)	NJN* (40–42)	IND* (40–42)	MIA* (38–44)	ATL (38–44)	PHI (35–47)	MIL (31–51)	CHA (31–51)	WAS (25–57)	ORL (21–61)	—N/a
1992–93	NYK* (60–22)	CHI^ (57–25)	CLE* (54–28)	BOS* (48–34)	CHA* (44–38)	NJN* (43–39)	ATL* (43–39)	IND* (41–41)	ORL (41–41)	DET (40–42)	MIA (36–46)	MIL (28–54)	PHI (26–56)	WAS (22–60)	—N/a
1993–94	ATL* (57–25)	NYK^{+} (57–25)	CHI* (55–27)	ORL* (50–32)	IND* (47–35)	CLE* (47–35)	NJN* (45–37)	MIA* (42–40)	CHA (41–41)	BOS (32–50)	PHI (25–57)	WAS (24–58)	MIL (20–62)	DET (20–62)	—N/a
1994–95	ORL^{+} (57–25)	IND* (52–30)	NYK* (55–27)	CHA* (50–32)	CHI* (47–35)	CLE* (43–39)	ATL* (42–40)	BOS* (35–47)	MIL (34–48)	MIA (32–50)	NJN (30–52)	DET (28–54)	PHI (24–58)	WAS (21–61)	—N/a
1995–96	CHI^ (72–10)	ORL* (60–22)	IND* (52–30)	CLE* (47–35)	NYK* (47–35)	ATL* (46–36)	DET* (46–36)	MIA* (42–40)	CHA (41–41)	WAS (39–43)	BOS (33–49)	NJN (30–52)	MIL (25–57)	TOR (21–61)	PHI (18–64)
1996–97	CHI^ (69–13)	MIA* (61–21)	NYK* (57–25)	ATL* (56–26)	DET* (54–28)	CHA* (54–28)	ORL* (45–37)	WAS* (44–38)	CLE (42–40)	IND (39–43)	MIL (33–49)	TOR (30–52)	NJN (26–56)	PHI (22–60)	BOS (15–67)
1997–98	CHI^ (62–20)	MIA* (55–27)	IND* (58–24)	CHA* (51–31)	ATL* (50–32)	CLE* (47–35)	NYK* (43–39)	NJN* (43–39)	WAS (42–40)	ORL (41–41)	DET (37–45)	BOS (36–46)	MIL (36–46)	PHI (31–51)	TOR (16–66)
1998–99	MIA* (33–17)	IND* (33–17)	ORL* (33–17)	ATL* (31–19)	DET* (29–21)	PHI* (28–22)	MIL* (28–22)	NYK^{+} (27–23)	CHA (26–24)	TOR (23–27)	CLE (22–28)	BOS (19–31)	WAS (18–32)	NJN (16–34)	CHI (13–37)
1999–00	IND^{+} (56–26)	MIA* (52–30)	NYK* (50–32)	CHA* (49–33)	PHI* (49–33)	TOR* (45–37)	DET* (42–40)	MIL* (42–40)	ORL (41–41)	BOS (35–47)	CLE (32–50)	NJN (31–51)	WAS (29–53)	ATL (28–54)	CHI (17–65)

2000–2010 seasons

Season	Team (record)														
Season	1st	2nd	3rd	4th	5th	6th	7th	8th	9th	10th	11th	12th	13th	14th	15th
2000–01	PHI^{+} (56–26)	MIL* (52–30)	MIA* (50–32)	NYK* (48–34)	TOR* (47–35)	CHA* (46–36)	ORL* (43–39)	IND* (41–41)	BOS (36–46)	DET (32–50)	CLE (30–52)	NJN (26–56)	ATL (25–57)	WAS (19–63)	CHI (15–67)
2001–02	NJN^{+} (52–30)	DET* (50–32)	BOS* (49–33)	CHA* (44–38)	ORL* (44–38)	PHI* (43–39)	TOR* (42–40)	IND* (42–40)	MIL (41–41)	WAS (37–45)	MIA (36–46)	ATL (33–49)	NYK (30–52)	CLE (29–53)	CHI (21–61)
2002–03	DET* (50–32)	NJN^{+} (49–33)	IND* (48–34)	PHI* (48–34)	NO* (47–35)	BOS* (44–38)	MIL* (42–40)	ORL* (42–40)	NYK (37–45)	WAS (37–45)	ATL (35–47)	CHI (30–52)	MIA (25–57)	TOR (24–58)	CLE (17–65)
2003–04	IND* (61–21)	NJN* (47–35)	DET^ (54–28)	MIA* (42–40)	NO* (41–41)	MIL* (41–41)	NYK* (39–43)	BOS* (36–46)	CLE (35–47)	TOR (33–49)	PHI (33–49)	ATL (28–54)	WAS (25–57)	CHI (23–59)	ORL (21–61)
2004–05	MIA* (59–23)	DET^{+} (54–28)	BOS* (45–37)	CHI* (47–35)	WAS* (45–37)	IND* (44–38)	PHI* (43–39)	NJN* (42–40)	CLE (42–40)	ORL (36–46)	NYK (33–49)	TOR (33–49)	MIL (30–52)	CHA (18–64)	ATL (13–69)
2005–06	DET* (64–18)	MIA^ (52–30)	NJN* (49–33)	CLE* (50–32)	WAS* (42–40)	IND* (41–41)	CHI* (41–41)	MIL* (40–42)	PHI (38–44)	ORL (36–46)	BOS (33–49)	TOR (27–55)	CHA (26–56)	ATL (26–56)	NYK (23–59)
2006–07	DET* (53–29)	CLE^{+} (50–32)	TOR* (47–35)	MIA* (44–38)	CHI* (49–33)	NJN* (41–41)	WAS* (41–41)	ORL* (40–42)	PHI (35–47)	IND (35–47)	NYK (33–49)	CHA (33–49)	ATL (30–52)	MIL (28–54)	BOS (24–58)
2007–08	BOS^ (66–16)	DET* (59–23)	ORL* (52–30)	CLE* (45–37)	WAS* (43–39)	TOR* (41–41)	PHI* (40–42)	ATL* (37–45)	IND (36–46)	NJN (34–48)	CHI (33–49)	CHA (32–50)	MIL (26–56)	NYK (23–59)	MIA (15–67)
2008–09	CLE* (66–16)	BOS* (62–20)	ORL^{+} (59–23)	ATL* (47–35)	MIA* (43–39)	PHI* (41–41)	CHI* (41–41)	DET* (39–43)	IND (36–46)	CHA (35–47)	NJN (34–48)	MIL (34–48)	TOR (33–49)	NYK (32–50)	WAS (19–63)
2009–10	CLE* (61–21)	ORL* (59–23)	ATL* (53–29)	BOS^{+} (50–32)	MIA* (47–35)	MIL* (46–36)	CHA* (44–38)	CHI* (41–41)	TOR (40–42)	IND (32–50)	NYK (29–53)	DET (27–55)	PHI (27–55)	WAS (26–56)	NJN (12–70)

2010–2020 seasons

Season	Team (record)														
Season	1st	2nd	3rd	4th	5th	6th	7th	8th	9th	10th	11th	12th	13th	14th	15th
2010–11	CHI* (62–20)	MIA^{+} (58–24)	BOS* (56–26)	ORL* (52–30)	ATL* (44–38)	NYK* (42–40)	PHI* (41–41)	IND* (37–45)	MIL (35–47)	CHA (34–48)	DET (30–52)	NJN (24–58)	WAS (23–59)	TOR (22–60)	CLE (19–63)
2011–12	CHI* (50–16)	MIA^ (46–20)	IND* (42–24)	ATL* (40–26)	BOS* (39–27)	ORL* (37–29)	NYK* (36–30)	PHI* (35–31)	MIL (31–35)	DET (25–41)	TOR (23–43)	NJN (22–44)	CLE (21–45)	WAS (20–46)	CHA (7–59)
2012–13	MIA^ (66–16)	NYK* (54–28)	IND* (49–32)	BKN* (49–33)	CHI* (45–37)	ATL* (44–38)	BOS* (41–40)	MIL* (38–44)	PHI (34–48)	TOR (34–48)	DET (29–53)	WAS (29–53)	CLE (24–58)	CHA (21–61)	ORL (20–62)
2013–14	IND* (56–26)	MIA^{+} (54–28)	TOR* (48–34)	CHI* (48–34)	WAS* (44–38)	BKN* (44–38)	CHA* (43–39)	ATL* (38–44)	NYK (37–45)	CLE (33–49)	DET (29–53)	BOS (25–57)	ORL (23–59)	PHI (19–63)	MIL (15–67)
2014–15	ATL* (60–22)	CLE^{+} (53–29)	CHI* (50–32)	TOR* (49–33)	WAS* (46–36)	MIL* (41–41)	BOS* (40–42)	BKN* (38–44)	IND (38–44)	MIA (37–45)	CHA (33–49)	DET (32–50)	ORL (25–57)	PHI (18–64)	NYK (17–65)
2015–16	CLE^ (57–25)	TOR* (56–26)	MIA* (48–34)	ATL* (48–34)	BOS* (48–34)	CHA* (48–34)	IND* (45–37)	DET* (44–38)	CHI (42–40)	WAS (41–41)	ORL (35–47)	MIL (33–49)	NYK (32–50)	BKN (21–61)	PHI (10–72)
2016–17	BOS* (53–29)	CLE^{+} (51–31)	TOR* (51–31)	WAS* (49–33)	ATL* (43–39)	MIL* (42–40)	IND* (42–40)	CHI* (41–41)	MIA (41–41)	DET (37–45)	CHA (36–46)	NYK (31–51)	ORL (29–53)	PHI (28–54)	BKN (20–62)
2017–18	TOR* (59–23)	BOS* (55–27)	PHI* (52–30)	CLE^{+} (50–32)	IND* (48–34)	MIA* (44–38)	MIL* (44–38)	WAS* (43–39)	DET (39–43)	CHA (36–46)	NYK (29–53)	BKN (28–54)	CHI (27–55)	ORL (25–57)	ATL (24–58)
2018–19	MIL* (60–22)	TOR^ (58–24)	PHI* (51–31)	BOS* (49–33)	IND* (48–34)	BKN* (42–40)	ORL* (42–40)	DET* (41–41)	CHA (39–43)	MIA (39–43)	WAS (32–50)	ATL (29–53)	CHI (22–60)	CLE (19–63)	NYK (15–65)
2019–20	MIL* (56–17)	TOR* (53–19)	BOS* (48–24)	IND* (45–28)	MIA^{+} (44–29)	PHI* (43–30)	BKN* (35–37)	ORL* (33–40)	CHA (23–42)	WAS (25–47)	CHI (22–43)	NYK (21–45)	DET (20–46)	ATL (20–47)	CLE (19–46)

2020–2030 seasons

Season	Team (record)														
Season	1st	2nd	3rd	4th	5th	6th	7th	8th	9th	10th	11th	12th	13th	14th	15th
2020–21	PHI* (49–23)	BKN* (48–24)	MIL^ (46–26)	NYK* (41–31)	ATL* (41–31)	MIA* (40–32)	BOS* (36–36)	WAS* (34–38)	IND× (34–38)	CHA× (33–39)	CHI (31–41)	TOR (27–45)	CLE (22–50)	ORL (21–51)	DET (20–52)
2021–22	MIA* (53–29)	BOS^{+} (51–31)	MIL* (51–31)	PHI* (51–31)	TOR* (48–34)	CHI* (46–36)	BKN* (44–38)	CLE× (44–38)	ATL* (43–39)	CHA× (43–39)	NYK (37–45)	WAS (35–47)	IND (25–57)	DET (23–59)	ORL (22–60)
2022–23	MIL* (58–24)	BOS* (57–25)	PHI* (54–28)	CLE* (51–31)	NYK* (47–35)	BKN* (45–37)	MIA^{+} (44–38)	ATL* (41–41)	TOR× (41–41)	CHI× (40–42)	IND (35–47)	WAS (35–47)	ORL (34–48)	CHA (27–55)	DET (17–65)
2023–24	BOS^ (64–18)	NYK* (50–32)	MIL* (49–33)	CLE* (48–34)	ORL* (47–35)	IND* (47–35)	PHI* (47–35)	MIA* (46–36)	CHI× (39–43)	ATL× (36–46)	BKN (32–50)	TOR (25–57)	CHA (21–61)	WAS (15–67)	DET (14–68)
2024–25	CLE* (64–18)	BOS* (61–21)	NYK* (51–31)	IND^{+} (50–32)	MIL* (48–34)	DET* (44–38)	ORL* (41–41)	ATL× (40–42)	CHI× (39–43)	MIA* (37–45)	TOR (30–52)	BKN (26–56)	PHI (24–58)	CHA (19–63)	WAS (18–64)
2025–26	DET* (60–22)	BOS* (56–26)	NYK^ (53–29)	CLE* (52–30)	TOR* (46–36)	ATL* (46–36)	PHI* (45–37)	ORL* (45–37)	CHA× (44–38)	MIA× (43–39)	MIL (32–50)	CHI (31–51)	BKN (20–62)	IND (19–63)	WAS (17–65)
