= List of NBA awards =

The National Basketball Association (NBA) presents 13 annual awards to recognize its teams, players, and coaches for their accomplishments. This does not include the NBA championship trophy which is given to the winning team of the NBA Finals. The NBA's championship trophy made its first appearance after the inaugural NBA Finals in 1947. In 1964, it was named after Walter A. Brown who was instrumental in merging the Basketball Association of America and the National Basketball League into the NBA. The Brown Trophy design remained the same until 1977 when the current trophy design was first introduced although it retained the Walter A. Brown title. In 1984, the trophy was renamed to honor former NBA commissioner Larry O'Brien. The NBA then first started awarding Eastern Conference and Western Conference championship trophies in 2001, renaming them in 2022 after former players Bob Cousy and Oscar Robertson, respectively.

The NBA's first individual awards were the Rookie of the Year and the All-Star Game Most Valuable Player, both of which were introduced in 1953. Three individual awards are awarded during the postseason: the Larry Bird Eastern Conference Finals MVP, the Magic Johnson Western Conference Finals MVP, and the Bill Russell Finals MVP. The Executive of the Year is the only award not presented by the NBA. It is named annually by Sporting News but is officially recognized by the NBA.

Through the 2015–16 season and since the 2019–20 season, each individual award, with the exception of the Finals MVP, was awarded at the end of the regular season while the NBA playoffs were ongoing. This procedure was different from the other major professional sports leagues, which have long handed out individual awards after their postseasons have concluded. The 2016–17 season was the first in which the NBA held an awards show after the completion of the Finals, during which the winners of all season-long individual awards are announced except for the winner of the J. Walter Kennedy Citizenship Award, which continued to be announced during the playoffs until 2017 and in 2018 was announced after the playoffs but before the awards show.

Aside from these annual awards, the league also has weekly and monthly honors during the regular season for its players and coaches. In 2021, the NBA made a social justice award, named after 6-time NBA champion Kareem Abdul-Jabbar, the Kareem Abdul-Jabbar Social Justice Champion Award. This award was made to recognize players who are making strides in the fight for social justice.

== Team trophies ==
Award	First awarded	Description	Most recent winner	Notes
Larry O'Brien Trophy	1977	The NBA's championship trophy; awarded to the winning team of the NBA Finals. Named after Larry O'Brien, who served as NBA Commissioner from 1975 to 1984.	New York Knicks	
Walter A. Brown Trophy	1947	The NBA's first championship trophy which was awarded to the winning team of the NBA Finals until it was replaced with the Larry O'Brien Trophy. Named after team owner Walter A. Brown.	N/A; trophy retired after 1977	
Bob Cousy Trophy	2001	The NBA's Eastern Conference championship trophy; awarded to the winning team of the Eastern Conference Finals. Renamed after point guard Bob Cousy in 2022.	New York Knicks	
Oscar Robertson Trophy	2001	The NBA's Western Conference championship trophy; awarded to the winning team of the Western Conference Finals. Renamed after point guard Oscar Robertson in 2022.	San Antonio Spurs	
Maurice Podoloff Trophy	2023	The NBA's regular season championship trophy; awarded to the team with the best overall record in the regular season. Named after Maurice Podoloff, who served as NBA commissioner from 1946 to 1963. A previous Maurice Podoloff Trophy was awarded until 2021 to the NBA's most valuable player in the regular season.	Oklahoma City Thunder	
NBA Cup	2023	The NBA's in-season tournament championship trophy; awarded to the winning team of the NBA Cup tournament.	New York Knicks	
Nat "Sweetwater" Clifton Trophy	2022	The NBA's Atlantic Division championship trophy; awarded to the first-placed team in the Atlantic Division. Named after Nat Clifton, the first African American player to sign an NBA contract.	Boston Celtics	
Wayne Embry Trophy	2022	The NBA's Central Division championship trophy; awarded to the first-placed team in the Central Division. Named after Wayne Embry, the first African American NBA general manager and team president.	Detroit Pistons	
Earl Lloyd Trophy	2022	The NBA's Southeast Division championship trophy; awarded to the first-placed team in the Southeast Division. Named after Earl Lloyd, the first African American player to play a game in the NBA.	Atlanta Hawks	
Willis Reed Trophy	2022	The NBA's Southwest Division championship trophy; awarded to the first-placed team in the Southwest Division. Named after player, coach, and general manager Willis Reed.	San Antonio Spurs	
Sam Jones Trophy	2022	The NBA's Northwest Division championship trophy; awarded to the first-placed team in the Northwest Division. Named after shooting guard Sam Jones.	Oklahoma City Thunder	
Chuck Cooper Trophy	2022	The NBA's Pacific Division championship trophy; awarded to the first-placed team in the Pacific Division. Named after Chuck Cooper, the first African American player to be drafted by an NBA team.	Los Angeles Lakers	

== Honors ==
Honor	First awarded	Description	Notes
All-NBA Team	1947	Three 5-player teams (a first, second, and third team) composed of the best players in the league during the regular season as voted by a panel of sportswriters and broadcasters throughout the United States and Canada.	
All-Rookie Team	1963	Two 5-player teams (a first and second team) composed of the top rookies during the regular season as voted by NBA head coaches. The coaches are not allowed to vote for players of their own team.	
All-Defensive Team	1969	Two 5-player teams (a first and second team) composed of the best defensive players in the league during the regular season as voted by a panel of sportswriters and broadcasters throughout the United States and Canada.	

== Individual awards ==
Award	First awarded	Description	Most recent winner(s)	Notes
All-Star Game MVP	1951	Awarded to the best performing player of the annual NBA All-Star Game as voted by a panel of media members. Trophy renamed after shooting guard Kobe Bryant in 2020.	Anthony Edwards (Minnesota Timberwolves)	
Rookie of the Year	1953	Awarded to the top rookie of the NBA regular season as voted by a panel of sportswriters throughout the United States and Canada. Trophy renamed after center Wilt Chamberlain in 2022.	Cooper Flagg (Dallas Mavericks)	
Most Valuable Player	1956	Awarded to the best performing player of the NBA regular season as voted by a panel of sportswriters and media members. Trophy was originally named after Maurice Podoloff, the NBA commissioner from 1946 to 1963, but was dropped in 2021. In 2022, the trophy was renamed after shooting guard Michael Jordan.	Shai Gilgeous-Alexander (Oklahoma City Thunder)	
Coach of the Year	1963	Awarded to the best coach of the NBA regular season as voted by a panel of sportswriters and media members. Trophy renamed after coach Red Auerbach in 1967.	Joe Mazzulla (Boston Celtics)	
NBA Finals Most Valuable Player	1969	Awarded to the best performing player of the NBA Finals as voted by a panel of nine media members.^{[a]} Trophy renamed after center Bill Russell in 2009.	Jalen Brunson (New York Knicks)	
NBA Eastern Conference Finals Most Valuable Player	2022	Awarded to the best performing player of the Eastern Conference Finals as voted by a panel of media members. Trophy named after forward Larry Bird.	Jalen Brunson (New York Knicks)	
NBA Western Conference Finals Most Valuable Player	2022	Awarded to the best performing player of the Western Conference Finals as voted by a panel of media members. Trophy named after point guard Magic Johnson.	Victor Wembanyama (San Antonio Spurs)	
NBA Cup Most Valuable Player	2023	Awarded to the best performing player of the NBA Cup tournament as voted by a panel of media members.	Jalen Brunson (New York Knicks)	
Executive of the Year	1973	Awarded to the NBA's top front office executive as voted by the executives from the league's 30 teams.	Brad Stevens (Boston Celtics)	
Citizenship Award	1975	Awarded to a team member who showed "great service and dedication to the community" as voted by the PBWA. Named after J. Walter Kennedy, who served as NBA Commissioner from 1963 to 1975.	CJ McCollum (New Orleans Pelicans)	
Defensive Player of the Year	1983	Awarded to the top defensive player of the NBA regular season as voted by a panel of sportswriters throughout the United States and Canada. Trophy renamed after center Hakeem Olajuwon in 2022.	Victor Wembanyama (San Antonio Spurs)	
Sixth Man of the Year	1983	Awarded to the best performing player as a substitute (or sixth man) during the NBA regular season as voted by a panel of sportswriters. Trophy renamed after small forward John Havlicek in 2022.	Keldon Johnson (San Antonio Spurs)	
Most Improved Player	1986	Awarded to the most improved player in the NBA as voted by a panel of sportswriters throughout the United States and Canada. Trophy renamed after center George Mikan in 2022.	Nickeil Alexander-Walker (Atlanta Hawks)	
Sportsmanship Award	1996	Awarded to the player who most displays "the ideals of sportsmanship on the court with ethical behavior, fair play and integrity" as voted by NBA players. Trophy named after shooting guard Joe Dumars.	Derrick White (Boston Celtics)	
Teammate of the Year	2013	Awarded to the "ideal teammate" who exemplifies "selfless play and commitment and dedication to his team" as voted by NBA players. Named after Jack Twyman and Maurice Stokes, who were teammates from 1955 to 1958.	DeAndre Jordan (New Orleans Pelicans)	
Lifetime Achievement Award	2017	Awarded to the NBA player who has had a lifetime of achievement in the NBA.	Magic Johnson (Los Angeles Lakers) and Larry Bird (Boston Celtics)	
Social Justice Champion Award	2021	Awarded to the NBA player who are making strides in the fight for social justice. Named after center Kareem Abdul-Jabbar, based on his involvement with social activism.	Bam Adebayo (Miami Heat)	
Clutch Player of the Year	2023	Awarded to the NBA player who best comes through for his teammates in the clutch. Trophy named after point guard Jerry West.	Shai Gilgeous-Alexander (Oklahoma City Thunder)	
Hustle Award	2017	Awarded to the NBA player who makes the effort plays that don't often appear in the traditional box score but impact winning on a nightly basis.	Moussa Diabaté (Charlotte Hornets)	

== See also ==
- 50 Greatest Players in NBA History
- NBA Rookie of the Month Award
- NBA Player of the Month and Week
- Top 10 Coaches in NBA History
- Top 10 Teams in NBA History
- List of NBA All-Stars
- Sports Illustrated NBA All-Decade Team (2009)
- Sports Illustrated NBA All-Decade awards and honors (2009)

== Notes ==
- ^{a} Though the award winner is usually determined by nine votes, fans balloting on NBA.com accounted for the tenth vote in at least one NBA Finals.
- ^{b} Los Angeles Clippers player, Montrezl Harrell won the 2019-20 NBA Hustle Award, which honors the player that makes the energy and effort plays to help his team win throughout the season.
