= Commissioner's Trophy (MLB) =

Major League Baseball award

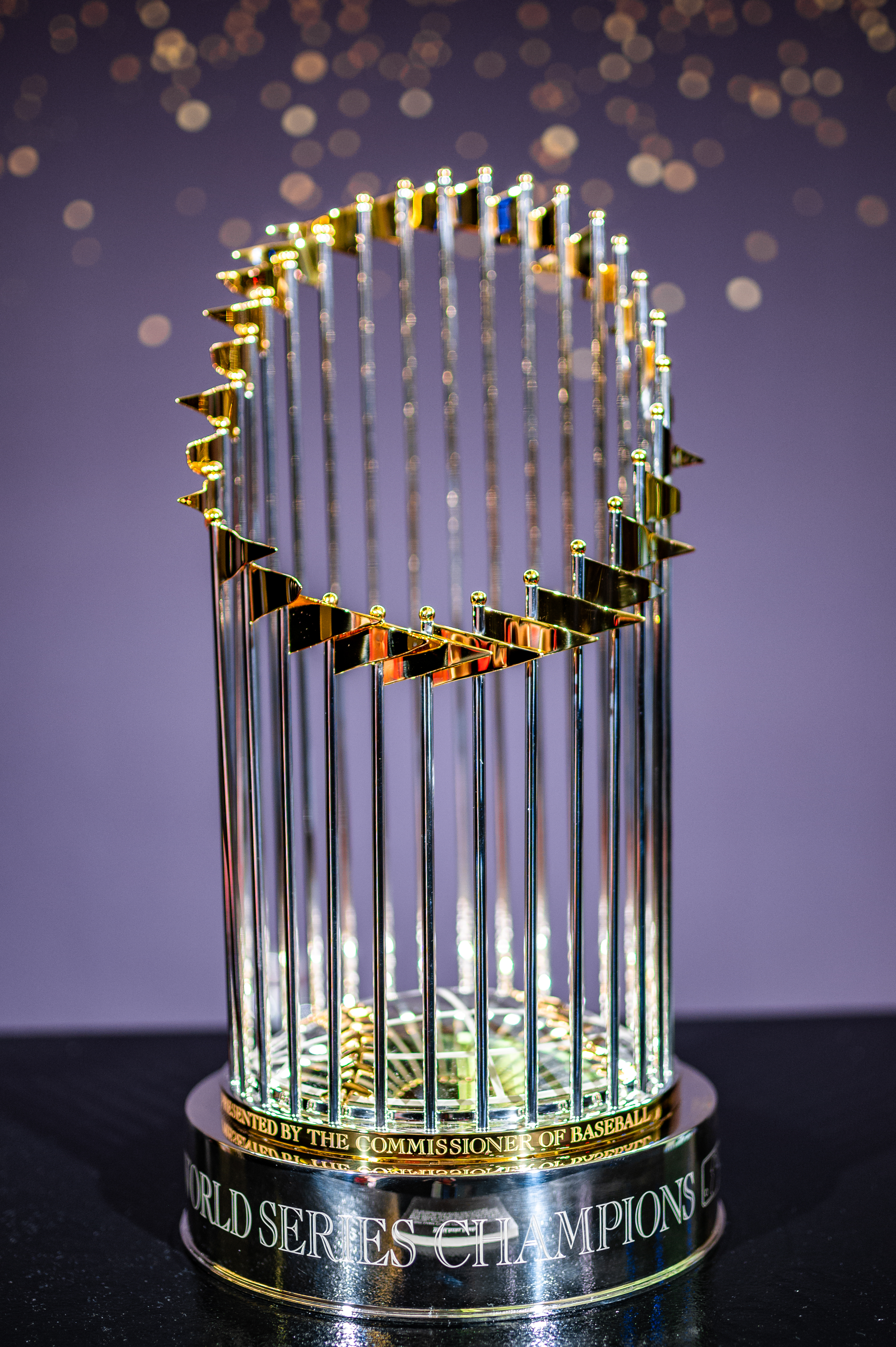
- Sport: Baseball
- Competition: Major League Baseball postseason
- Awarded for: Winning the World Series
- Country: United States; Canada
- Presented by: Major League Baseball

History
- First award: 1967
- Editions: 59
- First winner: St. Louis Cardinals
- Most wins: New York Yankees (7 titles)
- Most recent: Milwaukee Brewers (1st title)
- Website: World Series trophy profile

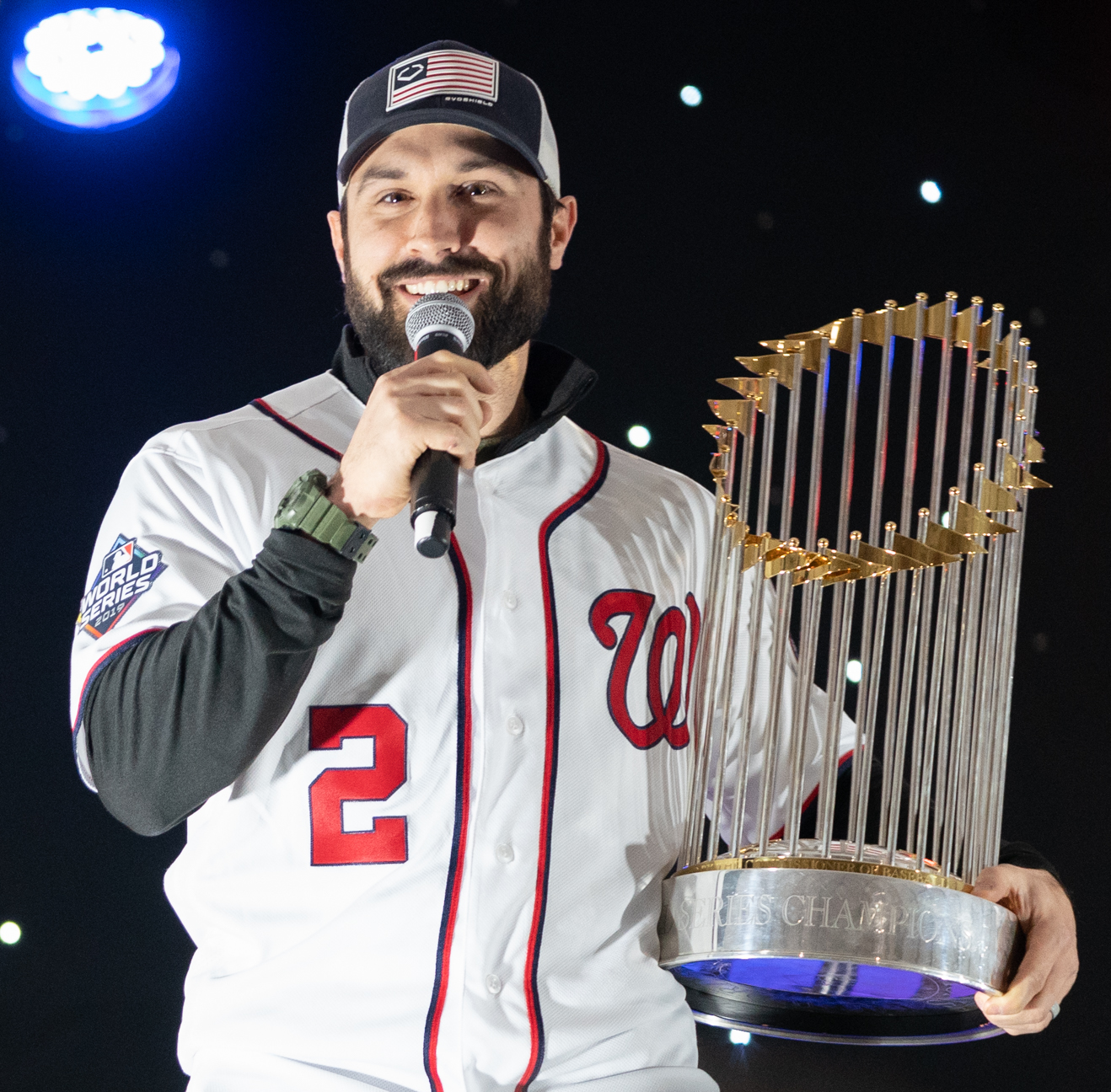
Adam Eaton holding the 2019 trophy

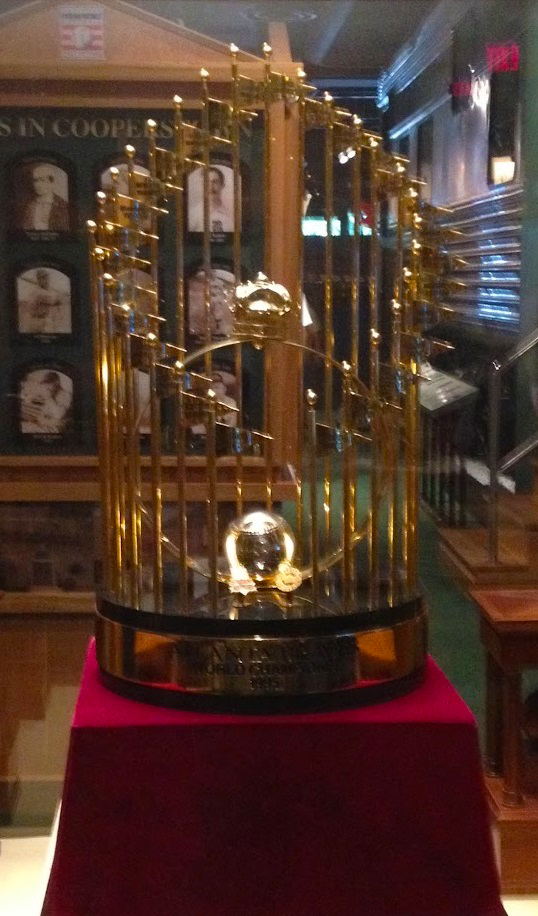
The 1995 World Series Commissioner's Trophy on display in the Ivan Allen Jr. Braves Museum and Hall of Fame at Turner Field, the former stadium of the Atlanta Braves. This was the design of the Commissioner's Trophy from 1967 to 1999.

The Commissioner's Trophy is a trophy presented each year by the commissioner of baseball to Major League Baseball's (MLB) World Series champion. The trophy depicts flags representing each team in Major League Baseball. It is the only championship trophy of the major professional sports leagues in the United States and Canada in North America that is not named after a particular person (contrasting with the National Hockey League's Stanley Cup, Major League Soccer's Philip F. Anschutz Trophy, the National Basketball Association's Larry O'Brien Championship Trophy, and the National Football League's Vince Lombardi Trophy).

== History ==
Although it was named in 1985, the trophy was first awarded in 1967, when the St. Louis Cardinals defeated the Boston Red Sox. Coincidentally, the 1967 World Series was nine months after the first Super Bowl, where the Green Bay Packers were awarded the AFL-NFL World Championship Trophy for defeating the Kansas City Chiefs (the trophy was renamed the Vince Lombardi Trophy prior to Super Bowl V following Lombardi's death in September 1970).

The trophy was not without precedent in Major League Baseball: the Dauvray Cup (named after actress Helen Dauvray) was awarded to the winner of the World Series between the National League and the American Association from 1887 to 1890, and when a solitary major league remained, to the winner of the National League pennant, from 1891 to 1893. The Dauvray Cup was to be held by the victorious team and was to be relinquished the following year when (and if) a new champion team emerged. The Dauvray Cup mysteriously vanished following the 1893 series and has never been located. From 1894 to 1897, the Temple Cup was awarded to the winner of a postseason contest between the two top National League clubs.

A new Commissioner's Trophy is created each year, much like the Anschutz Trophy, the O'Brien Trophy and the Lombardi Trophy, and unlike the Stanley Cup, which is passed from champion to champion (the NBA's former championship trophy, the Walter A. Brown Trophy, was passed from champion to champion through 1976; a newly-designed trophy which was to become the O'Brien Trophy debuted in 1977).

Historically, the Commissioner's Trophy was only presented in the winner's locker room, but beginning in 1997, the presentation occurred on the field if the champion clinched the title in their home stadium. Since 2017, when the Houston Astros won the World Series at Dodger Stadium, the championship presentation occurs on the field even if the champion clinches the title on the road.

Since its inception, the only year that the Commissioner's Trophy has not been awarded was 1994, when the players' strike ended the season on August 12, resulting in the cancellation of the entire post-season.

The New York Yankees have won the most Commissioner's Trophies, winning seven World Series since 1977. The Los Angeles Dodgers has won five trophies, a National League record. On the AL side, Boston Red Sox and the Oakland Athletics have each won four trophies.

On October 31, 2018, during the parade celebrating the Boston Red Sox winning the World Series, the trophy was damaged by a beer can thrown by a spectator of the parade; it was subsequently repaired.

In 2020, in discussing the punishments for the Houston Astros sign stealing scandal, which did not include stripping the Astros of their 2017 championship, commissioner Rob Manfred referred to the Commissioner's Trophy as "a piece of metal." Following criticism for the dismissive nature of the remark, Manfred issued a public apology.

== Design ==
The current trophy design was made by Tiffany & Co. and unveiled in 2000. It is 24 inches (61 cm) tall, excluding the base, and has a diameter of 11 inches (28 cm). It weighs approximately 30 pounds (14 kg) and is composed of sterling silver. The trophy features 30 gold-plated pennant flags, one for each Major League team. The flags rise above a silver baseball which is covered with latitude and longitude lines, symbolizing a globe as The World, and which features 24-karat vermeil stitching. The base contains an inscription copy of the signature of the commissioner and the words "Presented by the Commissioner of Baseball".

The original 1967 trophy was designed by Balfour Jewelers of Attleboro, Massachusetts, was modeled after Wrigley Field, and cost $2,500 (equivalent to $24,139 in 2025). It initially featured 20 gold-plated flags, representing the then-20 Major League Baseball clubs, and a new flag was then subsequently added for each expansion team that joined Major League Baseball. The flags rose above two objects in the center: a golden ring and a golden baseball. The two participating teams in each year's World Series were represented by two press pins set on the base of the trophy.

== By franchise ==
This table lists the teams that have won the Commissioner's Trophy since it was introduced in 1967. For a complete history of MLB championship teams, see List of World Series champions. The only team to win a World Series and not possess at least one Commissioner's Trophy are the Cleveland Guardians/Indians, having last won the World Series in 1948, 19 years before its introduction.

Team	Trophies	Seasons
New York Yankees	7	1977, 1978, 1996, 1998, 1999, 2000, 2009
Los Angeles Dodgers	5	1981, 1988, 2020, 2024, 2025
Boston Red Sox	4	2004, 2007, 2013, 2018
Oakland Athletics	4	1972, 1973, 1974, 1989
St. Louis Cardinals	4	1967, 1982, 2006, 2011
Cincinnati Reds	3	1975, 1976, 1990
San Francisco Giants	3	2010, 2012, 2014
Atlanta Braves	2	1995, 2021
Baltimore Orioles	2	1970, 1983
Detroit Tigers	2	1968, 1984
Houston Astros	2	2017, 2022
Kansas City Royals	2	1985, 2015
Miami Marlins	2	1997, 2003
Minnesota Twins	2	1987, 1991
New York Mets	2	1969, 1986
Philadelphia Phillies	2	1980, 2008
Pittsburgh Pirates	2	1971, 1979
Toronto Blue Jays	2	1992, 1993
Arizona Diamondbacks	1	2001
Chicago White Sox	1	2005
Chicago Cubs	1	2016
Los Angeles Angels	1	2002
Milwaukee Brewers	1	2026
Texas Rangers	1	2023
Washington Nationals	1	2019

== See also ==
- World Baseball Classic Trophy
- Chronicle-Telegraph Cup
