= Larry O'Brien Championship Trophy =

National Basketball Association trophy

- Sport: Basketball
- Competition: NBA playoffs
- Awarded for: Winning the NBA Finals

History
- First award: 1977
- First winner: Portland Trail Blazers
- Most wins: Los Angeles Lakers (11)
- Most recent: New York Knicks (1)

The Larry O'Brien Championship Trophy is the championship trophy awarded annually by the National Basketball Association (NBA) to the winner of the NBA Finals since its introduction in 1977. The trophy depicts a basketball over a hoop and basket. It is named after Larry O'Brien, who served as NBA commissioner from 1975 to 1984, and as United States Postmaster General under President Lyndon B. Johnson from 1965 to 1968.

== History ==
A new trophy was created for the 1977 NBA Finals, the first following the ABA–NBA merger. The inaugural winners were the Portland Trail Blazers, who defeated the Philadelphia 76ers in six games. Unlike the original championship trophy, the new trophy was given permanently to the winning team and a new one was made every year, similar to the Vince Lombardi Trophy, awarded annually to the winning team of the National Football League's Super Bowl and the Commissioner's Trophy, awarded annually to the winning team of Major League Baseball's World Series.

The trophy was initially called the "World Championship Trophy". In 1984, it was renamed to the Larry O'Brien Championship Trophy, in honor of Larry O'Brien, who served as NBA commissioner from 1975 to 1984. The Boston Celtics were the inaugural winners of the renamed trophy, defeating the Los Angeles Lakers in seven games in the 1984 NBA Finals.

As part of a series of redesigned awards as part of its 75th anniversary season, the trophy design was once again changed. The most notable change is two discs replacing the square foundation of the previous design. Victor Solomon, the designer of the new trophy, had designed it with a round base as he thought the former square base awkward to hold and prop the trophy upon in the hand. The two discs also function as the metal bands of the National Hockey League's Stanley Cup do. The top disc displays the league's first 75 championship teams from 1947 to 2021, while the bottom disc will contain the next 25 championship teams from 2022 to 2046, in time for the association's 100th anniversary. The redesigned trophy's ball and net are also slanted to the right, or forward, to represent the league's continued desire to be progressive.

=== Use in NBA Finals ===
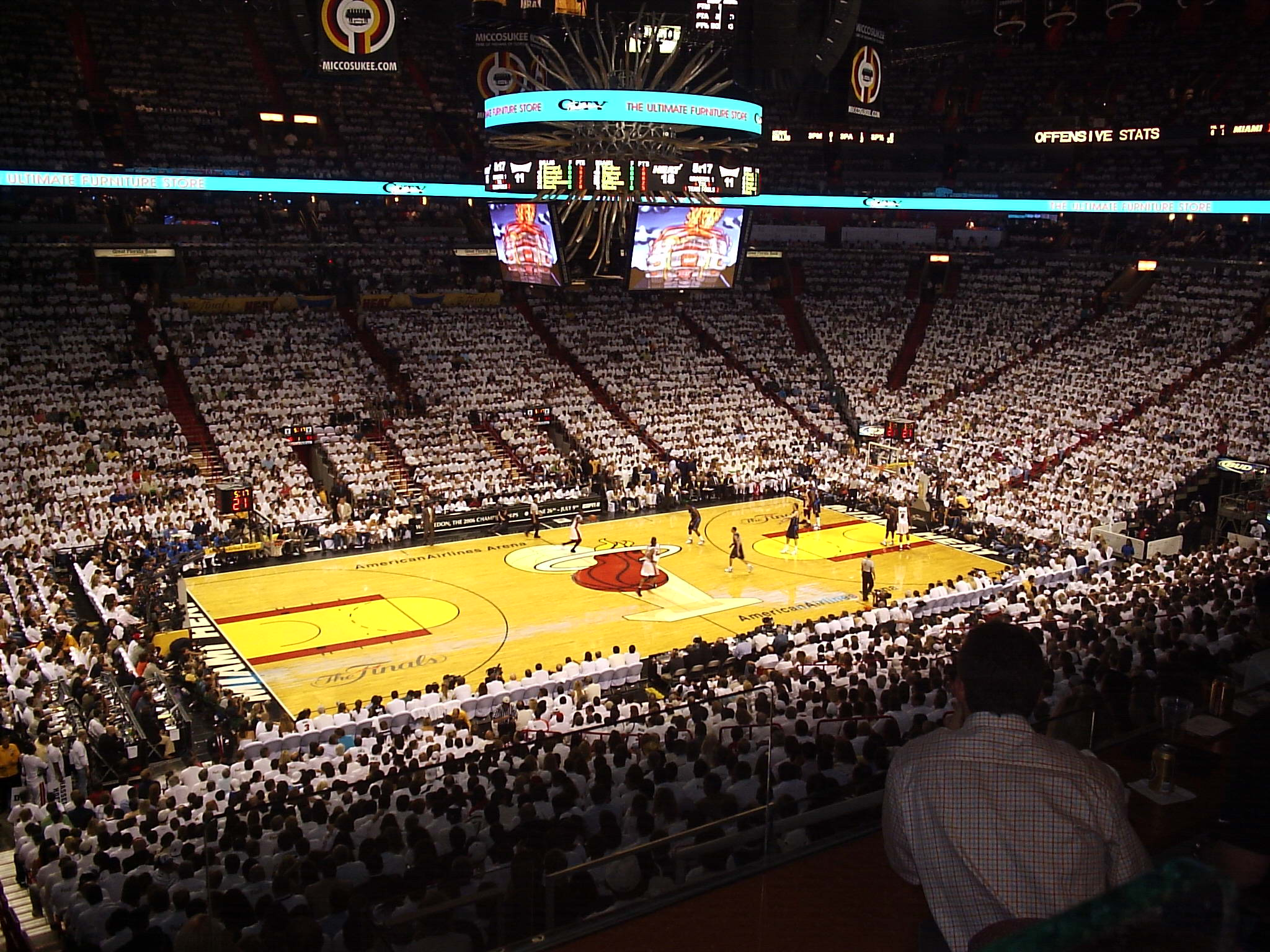
Game 3 of the 2006 NBA Finals, with the painted O'Brien trophy seen at center court behind the Miami Heat logo.

From the 2004–05 to 2008–09 season, the NBA used a painted version of the O'Brien trophy on the center of the court during the NBA Finals. The trophy was featured for the 2005, 2006, 2007, 2008, and 2009 NBA Finals before being removed, with players citing the slipperiness of the trophy and other decals. In 2025, after significant public backlash for the O'Brien Trophy missing at center court during the 2025 NBA Finals and use of a digital hologram of the trophy, NBA commissioner Adam Silver announced the return of the O'Brien trophy at center court, alongside the Finals script logo, with its official return being the 2026 NBA Finals.

Starting in the 1996 NBA Finals, both participating teams wore a jersey patch featuring a heavily stylized Larry O'Brien Trophy. From the 1999 through the 2001 NBA Finals, the trophy was featured as part of an oval patch which read "NBA Finals" and indicated the year. For the 2002 NBA Finals, the patch featured the O'Brien Trophy and the NBA logo, without the oval. From the 2003 to 2009 NBA Finals, the participating teams wore just the trophy design as a jersey patch, without the NBA logo. Since the 2010 NBA Finals, the trophy design has not been featured on the NBA Finals jersey patch.

== Description ==
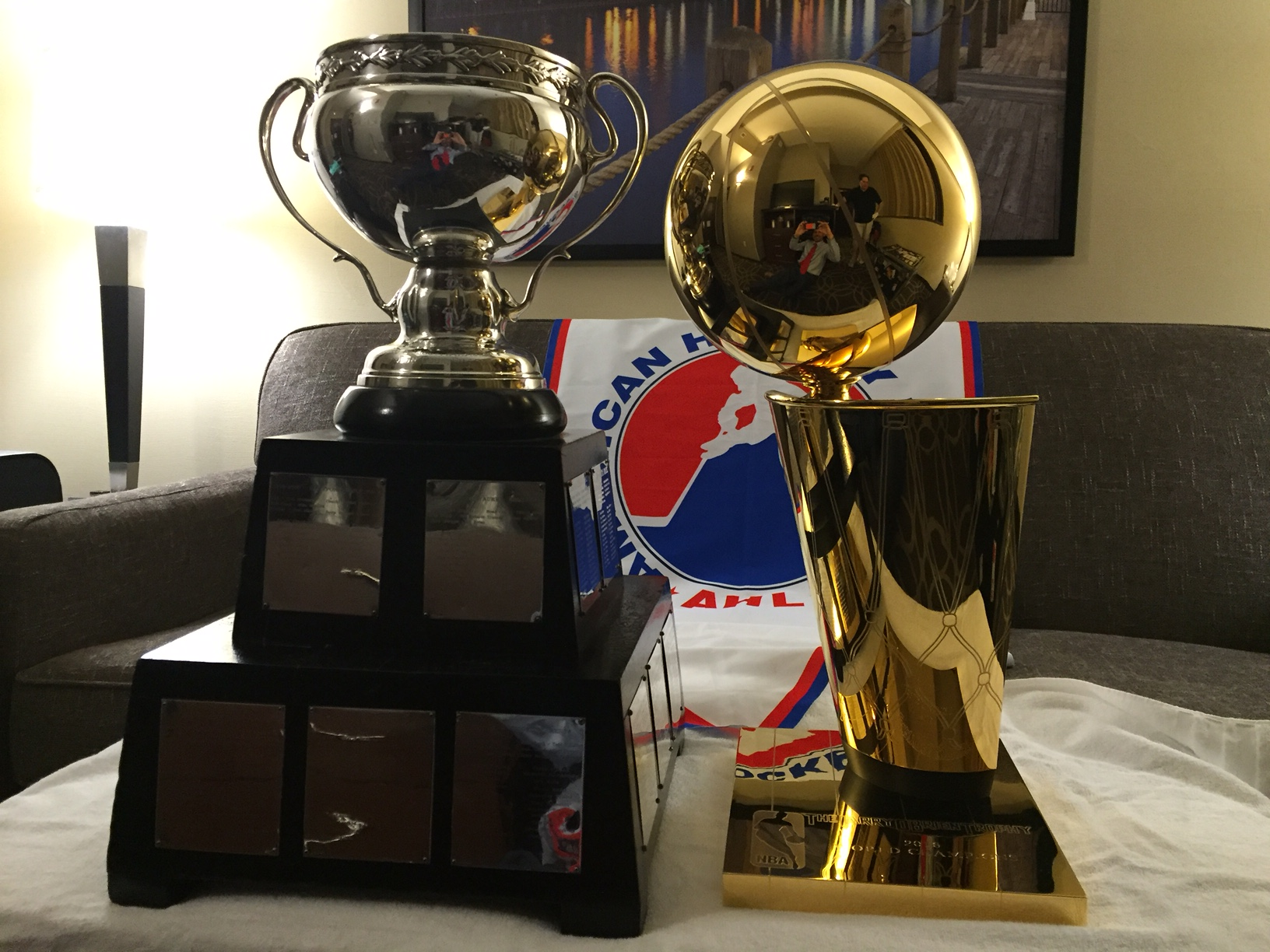
The original Larry O'Brien Trophy on the right that was awarded from 1977 to 2021

The trophy is two feet tall and is made of 15.5 pounds of sterling silver and vermeil with a 24 karat gold overlay. The basketball depicted on top is the same size as a real basketball. The trophy was designed by artist Victor Solomon for the NBA's 75th anniversary season and is manufactured by Tiffany & Co. The championship team maintains permanent possession of the trophy (although one exception exists, as described below). The year and winning team names are engraved on the trophies, and are often prominently displayed in the winning team's arena. After the sale of the Houston Rockets from Leslie Alexander to Tilman Fertitta in late 2017, Alexander maintained the ownership of the team's 1993–94 and 1994–95 trophies as mementos of his ownership. Thus, the team commissioned Tiffany to create replica versions of both Larry O'Brien trophies (and replacing the 1993–94 trophy, which was unexpectedly dropped and dented by reserve center Richard Petruška during the celebration), which were publicly unveiled on September 20, 2018.

The trophy's design was updated in 2021, with changes including the netting being more visible than on the original design, and the base of the trophy being changed from a square to a circular shape.

== Promotion ==
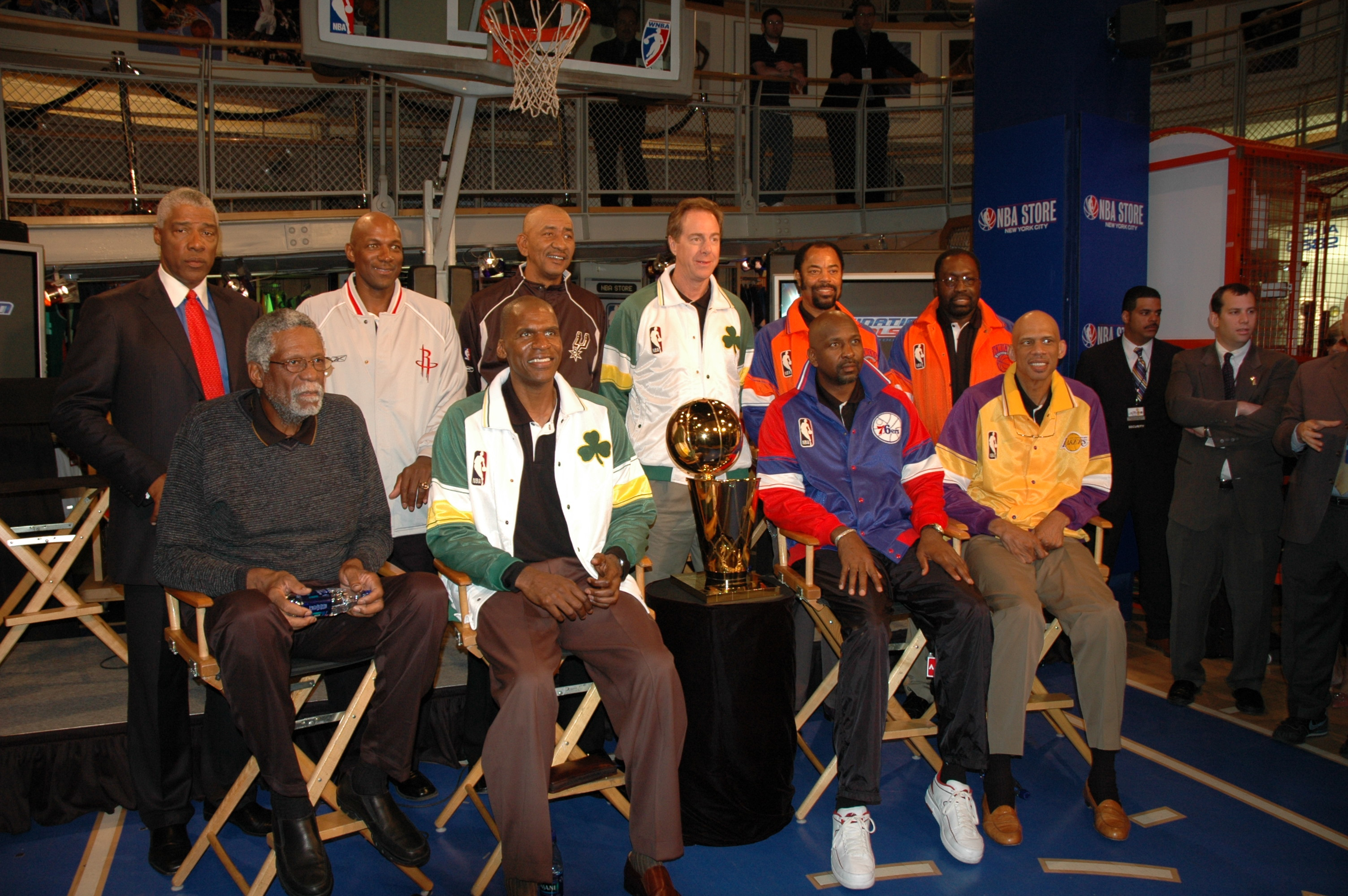
The O'Brien trophy displayed for the 2005 NBA Legends Tour in the New York City NBA Store

Although the Larry O'Brien Trophy has been compared with the National Hockey League's Stanley Cup, it has never been as prominent as the NHL trophy. To reduce this discrepancy, the NBA has been actively promoting the O'Brien Trophy in recent years to generate more recognition and an iconic status for the trophy. The trophy appeared on logos for the NBA Finals for the most part. After the Detroit Pistons won the NBA Finals in 2004, the trophy was toured around the state of Michigan, marking the first time the trophy toured around the state of the winning team. In 2005, the NBA Legends Tour was launched in New York City. As part of the tour, the O’Brien Trophy was showcased in various cities—including those that were hosting the playoffs—for fans' autograph and photo sessions. It was escorted by many former players, including Julius Erving, Kareem Abdul-Jabbar and Bill Russell. In May 2007, the NBA unveiled the NBA Headquarters on Second Life, an Internet-based virtual reality environment. With this launch, fans could take pictures with the championship trophy in the virtual Toyota Larry O'Brien Trophy Room. In August 2007, the trophy traveled to Hong Kong for the first time as part of the NBA Madness Asia Tour. Leading up to the 2023 NBA Finals, the trophy went on a "bucket list", traveling to various locations across sports and entertainment, as well as meeting numerous celebrities. This coincided with the launch of new social media accounts made specifically for the trophy itself.

== Winners ==
This table lists the 18 teams that have won the Larry O'Brien Championship Trophy since it was introduced in 1977. It includes trophies awarded before it was renamed in 1984. For a complete history of NBA championship teams, see List of NBA champions.

Team	Wins	Years
Los Angeles Lakers	11	1980, 1982, 1985, 1987, 1988, 2000, 2001, 2002, 2009, 2010, 2020
Chicago Bulls	6	1991, 1992, 1993, 1996, 1997, 1998
Boston Celtics	5	1981, 1984, 1986, 2008, 2024
San Antonio Spurs	5	1999, 2003, 2005, 2007, 2014
Golden State Warriors	4	2015, 2017, 2018, 2022
Detroit Pistons	3	1989, 1990, 2004
Miami Heat	3	2006, 2012, 2013
Houston Rockets	2	1994, 1995
Seattle SuperSonics / Oklahoma City Thunder	2	1979, 2025
Cleveland Cavaliers	1	2016
Dallas Mavericks	1	2011
Denver Nuggets	1	2023
Milwaukee Bucks	1	2021
New York Knicks	1	2026
Philadelphia 76ers	1	1983
Portland Trail Blazers	1	1977
Toronto Raptors	1	2019
Washington Bullets/Wizards	1	1978

== See also ==
- Walter A. Brown Trophy
- List of NBA awards
- List of NBA champions
