= NBA Finals =

North America basketball championship series

- The NBA Finals logo used since 2022

Tournament information
- Sport: Basketball
- Month played: June
- Established: 1947
- Administrator: National Basketball Association
- Format: Best-of-seven series
- Teams: 2
- Defending champions: New York Knicks (3rd title)
- Most championships: Boston Celtics (18 titles)
- Broadcast: ABC/ESPN app ESPN Radio

Most recent tournament
- 2026 NBA Finals

The NBA Finals is the annual championship series of the National Basketball Association (NBA). The Eastern and Western Conference champions play a best-of-seven series to determine the league champion. The team that wins the series is awarded the Larry O'Brien Championship Trophy, which replaced the original Walter A. Brown Trophy in 1976–77 following the ABA–NBA merger, though under the name "World Championship Trophy" before being renamed in 1983-84.

The series was initially known as the BAA Finals prior to the 1949–50 season when the Basketball Association of America (BAA) merged with the National Basketball League (NBL) to form the NBA. The competition oversaw further name changes to NBA World Championship Series from 1950 to 1985, as well as a brief stint as the Showdown, before settling on NBA Finals in 1986.

The NBA Finals was initially structured in a 2–2–1–1–1 format. In 1985, to ease the amount of cross-country travel, it was changed to a 2–3–2 format, in which the first two and last two games of the series were played at the arena of the team who earned home-court advantage by having the better record during the regular season. In 2014, the 2–2–1–1–1 format was restored. The team with the better regular season record hosts the first two games and the other team hosts the next two games. If needed, the remaining three are played at each team's home arena alternately, starting with the arena of the team with the better regular season record.

A total of 21 franchises have won the NBA Finals, with the New York Knicks winning the most recent and earning their third title overall.

== History ==
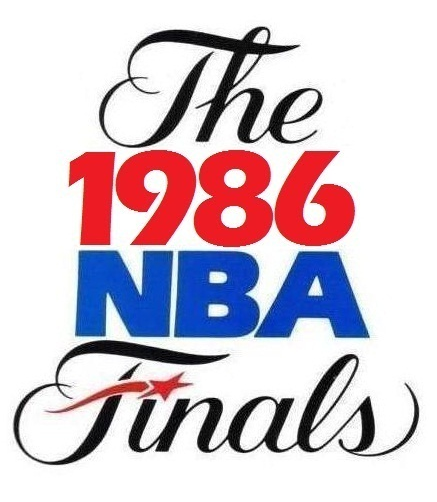
NBA Finals logo from 1986 to 1995. The year designation changed annually.

NBA Finals logo from 2004 to 2017.

NBA Finals logo from 2018 to 2021.

=== 1940s–1950s: Beginnings and Lakers dynasty ===
The beginning era of modern professional basketball was dominated by the Minneapolis Lakers, who won five of the first ten titles. The Philadelphia Warriors also won multiple championships, including the inaugural title in 1947 and another in 1956 to bookend the NBA's first decade.

After being founded in 1946, the Basketball Association of America completed its inaugural season in April 1947 with the Philadelphia Warriors defeating the Chicago Stags in the 1947 BAA Finals in five games. The following season the Warriors again reached the Finals, however they fell short to the now defunct Baltimore Bullets. To date the Baltimore Bullets are the only defunct team to win a championship.

In 1948, the Minneapolis Lakers won the championship of the rival National Basketball League before joining the BAA. Led by future Hall of Famer George Mikan, the Lakers won the third and final BAA championship in 1949 over the Red Auerbach-coached Washington Capitals. The BAA then merged with the NBL to form the National Basketball Association before the 1949–50 season. The Lakers won the inaugural NBA championship in 1950 to become the first team to repeat as champions.

In 1951, the Rochester Royals defeated the New York Knicks in the only Finals contested between two teams from the same state (something not possible under the current NBA alignment). This was the first of three consecutive losses in the Finals for the Knicks. Meanwhile, the Lakers won three straight Finals from 1952 to 1954 to become the first team to three-peat while also winning their fifth title in six seasons.

Of the five franchises to win a championship from 1947 to 1956, one (the Bullets) folded and the other four (the Warriors, Lakers, Royals, and Syracuse Nationals) all relocated by 1964.

=== 1950s–1960s: Celtics dynasty ===
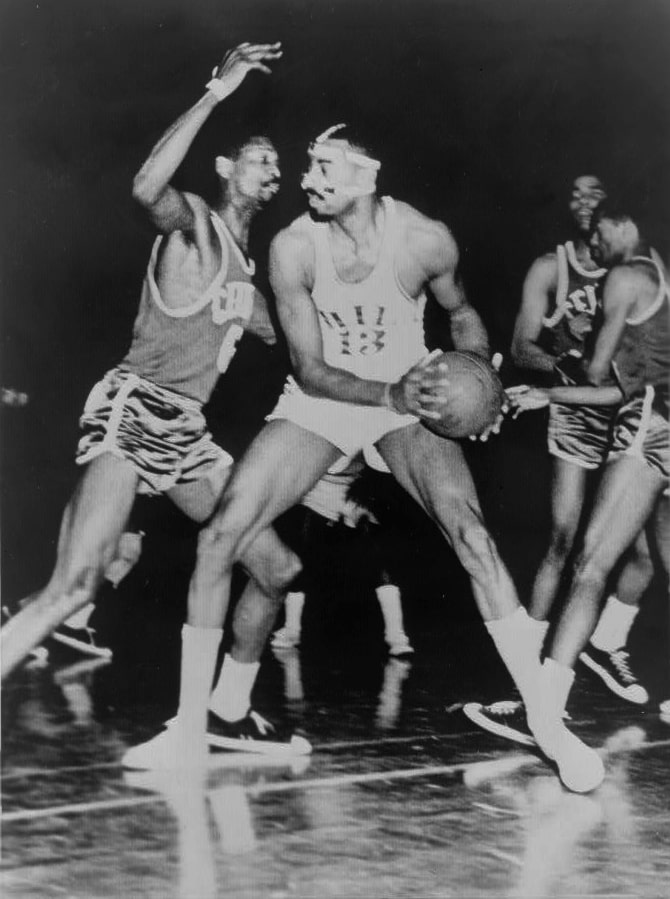
Bill Russell (off ball) was a member of one of the first dynasties in the NBA, winning eight straight titles while contending against Wilt Chamberlain (on ball).

The Boston Celtics won 11 of the 12 NBA Finals they reached during 13 seasons (1957, 1959–66, 1968–69), including eight straight NBA championships from 1959 through 1966. During this time the St. Louis Hawks also won their only title before moving to Atlanta and the Philadelphia 76ers won their first title since relocating from Syracuse.

With the establishment of the Celtics dynasty in 1957, spearheaded by center Bill Russell, the team saw great success. Despite encountering some difficulty when up against teams led by Wilt Chamberlain, for most of the late 1950s and 1960s, the Celtics and Russell managed to have an upper hand on Chamberlain's teams.

In 1964, Chamberlain, who had moved to the state of California alongside his team, led the San Francisco Warriors to a Western Division championship, but again failed to conquer the Celtics. The following season, he returned to the Eastern Division to join the Philadelphia 76ers after the former Syracuse Nationals relocated to the city to cover the vacancy created by the Warriors.

The first clash between the two stars in the playoffs was in 1966, with Boston winning the series 4–1. In the following season, Philadelphia coach Alex Hannum instructed Chamberlain to provide an increased focus on playing a team game, to avoid drawing the double-teams that troubled Chamberlain during the Finals. This tactical change brought the team to a new record of 68 wins the following season, as well as defeating the Celtics before winning the 1967 Finals. In 1968, Boston overcame a 3–1 deficit against Philadelphia to once again arrive in the Finals. They went on to defeat the Los Angeles Lakers in the Finals to again become NBA champions.

In 1969, the Celtics faced great difficulty entering the postseason, as they had an aging team and multiple injuries to a number of players. They qualified for the playoffs as the fourth and final seed in the East, while the Lakers, who had added Chamberlain in the off-season to join stars Jerry West and Elgin Baylor, won the West and were prohibitive favorites to become champions for the first time since relocating to Los Angeles. Despite holding a 2–1 advantage going into Game 4, the Lakers led 87–86 and had the ball with 10 seconds to play. But after a turnover, Sam Jones scored to give the Celtics a narrow 88–87 win and tying the series. The series was eventually tied 3–3 going into Game 7 in Los Angeles, with Lakers owner Jack Cooke hanging balloons in the arena in anticipation of a Lakers victory. West also picked up injuries to his thigh and hamstring during the series, but returned to play for the final game. Russell utilized this newly lacking mobility in West to organize fast breaks at every opportunity for the Celtics, which allowed them to gain an early lead. They held off a furious Lakers comeback to win 108–106 and win the series, and win their eleventh championship in 13 years.

As many stars either declined or retired following this win, it is largely recognized as the last NBA Finals featuring the Celtics dynasty.

=== 1970s: Decade of parity ===
The 1970s saw ten different teams reach the Finals and eight different teams win a championship, the most of any decade in the NBA, with the Boston Celtics and New York Knicks winning twice.

In 1970, a classic Finals featured the Knicks against the Lakers. In the waning moments of Game 3, with the series tied, Jerry West hit a basket from 60 feet to tie the game, a shot that became one of the most famous ever. However, the Knicks won in overtime and eventually won the series in 7 games. Game 7 featured an injured Willis Reed returning to action for the Knicks and inspiring his team to victory, though Reed scored only 4 points. The following season had another first-time champion, as the Milwaukee Bucks, led by Oscar Robertson and Kareem Abdul-Jabbar, defeated the Baltimore Bullets.

Two seasons after losing in the Finals, the Lakers won 33 straight games, the longest winning streak in NBA history. By season's end, they broke the record for most wins in a season with 69, one more than the 1966–67 Philadelphia 76ers, before taking home the championship for the first time since relocating to Los Angeles, beating the Knicks. The Knicks returned to win the Finals again a season later, followed by the Celtics' 12th title in 1974.

The late 1970s were characterized by a major breakthrough of the league's western franchises. In 1975, after compiling a 48–34 regular season record, the Golden State Warriors swept the Washington Bullets 4–0 in the 1975 NBA Finals. In 1976, the Phoenix Suns, after only eight years of existence, overcame an 18–27 losing record early in the regular season to build a remarkable run to finish 42–40. The team, nicknamed the "Sunderella Suns," achieved upset victories over the Seattle SuperSonics and the Warriors, before facing the Celtics in the Finals. The teams split the first four games, before Game 5 went into three overtimes, and Boston won 128–126. The Celtics quickly managed to secure their 13th championship, and second in three years, defeating the Suns 87–80 in Game 6.

Franchises that won their first titles in the 1970s included the New York Knicks in 1970, Milwaukee Bucks in 1971, the Portland Trail Blazers in 1977, and the Washington Bullets, who defeated the Seattle SuperSonics, in 1978. The Sonics exacted revenge on the Bullets the following season, beating Washington in five games in 1979 to win their first title.

=== 1980s: Celtics–Lakers rivalry and "Bad Boys" Pistons ===
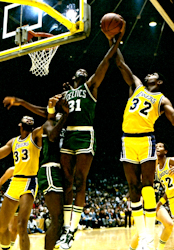
The 1980s saw a renewal in the rivalry between the Boston Celtics (green) and the Los Angeles Lakers (gold), combining to win eight titles.

The 1980s were mostly known for the rivalry between the Boston Celtics and the Los Angeles Lakers, who combined to win eight titles in the decade. Rookie Magic Johnson led the Showtime Lakers to the 1980 NBA Finals against the Philadelphia 76ers, who were led by Julius Erving. The Lakers took a 3–2 lead, but Kareem Abdul-Jabbar could not play in Game 6 due to injury. Johnson, a natural point guard, was shifted to center and played every position on the court during the game, scoring 42 points, with 15 rebounds and 7 assists to win his first championship and Finals MVP honors, becoming the first and only rookie to win the award.

Boston reached the 1981 NBA Finals led by the "Big Three" of Larry Bird, Kevin McHale, and Robert Parish. They met the Houston Rockets, who were carried practically single-handedly by Moses Malone and upset the Lakers in the first round. The Rockets were only the second team in NBA history to make the Finals after posting a losing record in the regular season, and the Celtics had an NBA best record of 62–20. The Celtics won the Finals in 6 games.

The Lakers returned to the Finals in 1982, this time led by new coach Pat Riley, in a rematch against the 76ers. The 76ers defeated the Celtics in the Eastern Conference finals in a 7-game series, but were defeated by the Lakers in 6 games. The 76ers responded by trading for Moses Malone, the league's reigning MVP. With the new duo of Malone and Erving, the 76ers won the 1983 NBA Finals in a sweep of the Lakers.

The Celtics and Lakers met in the Finals in 1984, 1985, and 1987. In 1984, the Celtics toppled the Lakers 4–3. The final game of this series attracted the largest ever TV audience for an NBA game, and the second-largest ever for a basketball game, with only the 1979 NCAA Championship game between Johnson and Bird having a larger audience. The teams faced off again in 1985 and 1987, but the Lakers came up on top both times, winning in 6 games despite each time, despite losing Game 1 in 1985 by 34 points in the Memorial Day Massacre. The 1987 Finals included Johnson hitting a hook shot with two seconds left in Game 4 to give the Lakers a 107–106 win and a 3–1 series lead.

In the following two seasons, the Celtics failed to reach the Finals, becoming overshadowed by the Detroit Pistons. The Lakers defended their title in the 1988 NBA Finals, winning the series in 7 games against the Pistons. They became the first team to win back-to-back NBA titles since 1969. Seeking a three-peat in 1989, the Lakers were swept by the Pistons in a rematch of the previous year's Finals. The Pistons were nicknamed the "Bad Boys" due to their rough, physical play led by future Hall of Fame guards Joe Dumars and Isiah Thomas and a rugged front court with Bill Laimbeer and Dennis Rodman. In 1990, the Pistons went back-to-back, defeating the Clyde Drexler-led Portland Trail Blazers in five games.

=== 1990s: Bulls dynasty ===
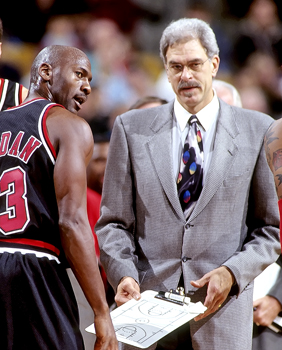
Michael Jordan cemented himself as one of the greatest players of all time, winning six NBA championships with Scottie Pippen and coach Phil Jackson.

The majority of the 1990s was marked by the supremacy of the Chicago Bulls. The Bulls, led by head coach Phil Jackson and star players Michael Jordan and Scottie Pippen, won six titles in six Finals appearances from 1991 to 1998. The only other teams to win a title during this decade were the Houston Rockets, who won titles in 1994 and 1995, and the San Antonio Spurs in 1999.

The Bulls' first championship came at the expense of the Los Angeles Lakers, in the last Finals appearance for Magic Johnson. The series was billed as a showdown between the aging Johnson and the upstart Jordan. The Lakers won the first game, however, for the rest of the series, Pippen guarded Johnson allowing Jordan to primarily focus on scoring, until Game 5 when Jordan switched back to Johnson, forcing 6 critical turnovers. The Bulls won the next four games to win the series 4–1. The Bulls returned to the Finals the next year, pitted against Clyde Drexler and the Portland Trail Blazers. Chicago defeated the Trail Blazers in Game 1 by 33 points, a game notable for Jordan breaking the record for the most three-pointers in a first half, with six. The Bulls went on to win the series in six games.

In 1993, The Bulls were matched against the Phoenix Suns, led by Charles Barkley, who was the league's reigning MVP of the Phoenix Suns. After dropping the first two games at home, The Suns won Game 3 in Chicago in triple overtime. The Bulls came back to win Game 4 with Jordan scoring 55 points and tying Rick Barry for the second-most points in an NBA Finals game. Chicago clinched the series in Game 6, 99–98, on John Paxson's three-pointer, as the Bulls became the third team in history to three-peat. After this win, Jordan retired from basketball to pursue a career in baseball.

Following Jordan's departure, the Houston Rockets, led by Hakeem Olajuwon, won the 1994 and 1995 NBA titles. During this time, Olajuwon became the only player in history to win the NBA MVP, NBA Defensive Player of the Year and Finals MVP awards in the same season.

After his short stint with baseball, Jordan returned to basketball late in the 1994–95 season. Although he did not lead the Bulls to the Finals for that season, he returned to pre-retirement form the next season while the team acquired perennial rebounding champion Dennis Rodman. The 1995–96 Bulls finished the regular season 72–10, attaining, at the time, the best regular season record in NBA history. They dominated in the playoffs, going 11–1 in the first three rounds, before facing the Seattle SuperSonics in the NBA Finals. After the Bulls took a 3–0 series lead, Seattle won the next two games after point guard Gary Payton asked his coach George Karl to be switched onto Jordan. Jordan altered his game to deal with Payton, and the Bulls won Game 6 to win their fourth title.

In 1997 and 1998, the Bulls met the Utah Jazz in the Finals twice. Led by Dream Team Olympians John Stockton and Karl Malone, the Jazz were defeated in both Finals by the Bulls in six games. In both series, Chicago won by hitting winning shots in the sixth game, the first by Steve Kerr in 1997 in Chicago, and the second by Jordan in Utah in 1998. This saw Chicago winning their sixth NBA championship, and winning their second three-peat. Jordan retired following this season, which set off a chain reaction that resulted in most of the team, including Jordan and Pippen, leaving the Bulls. With no foundation of youth to build upon, the Bulls became a lottery-bound team for the next six seasons.

=== 2000s: Spurs and Lakers dominance ===
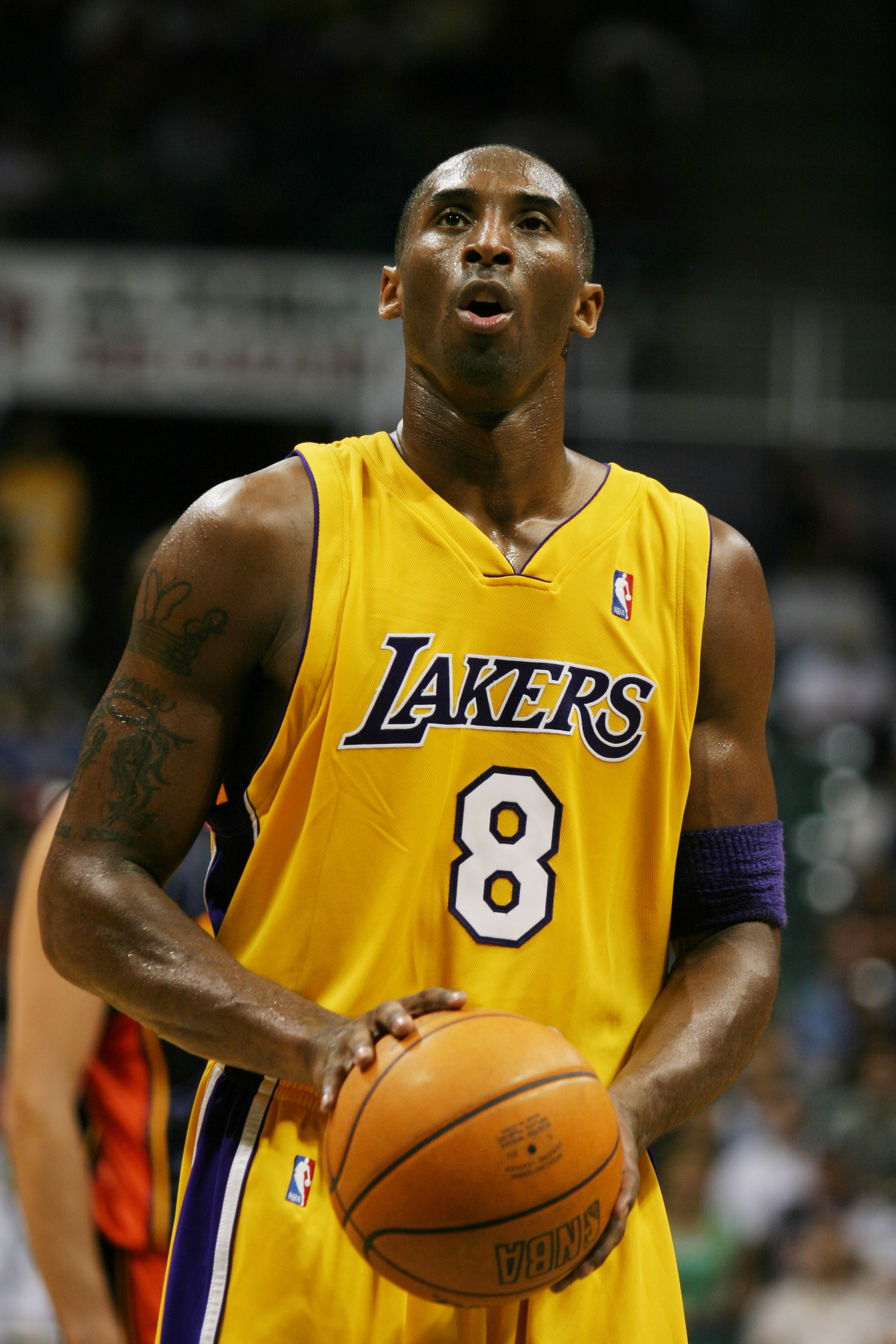
Kobe Bryant won five championships with the Los Angeles Lakers from 2000 to 2010.

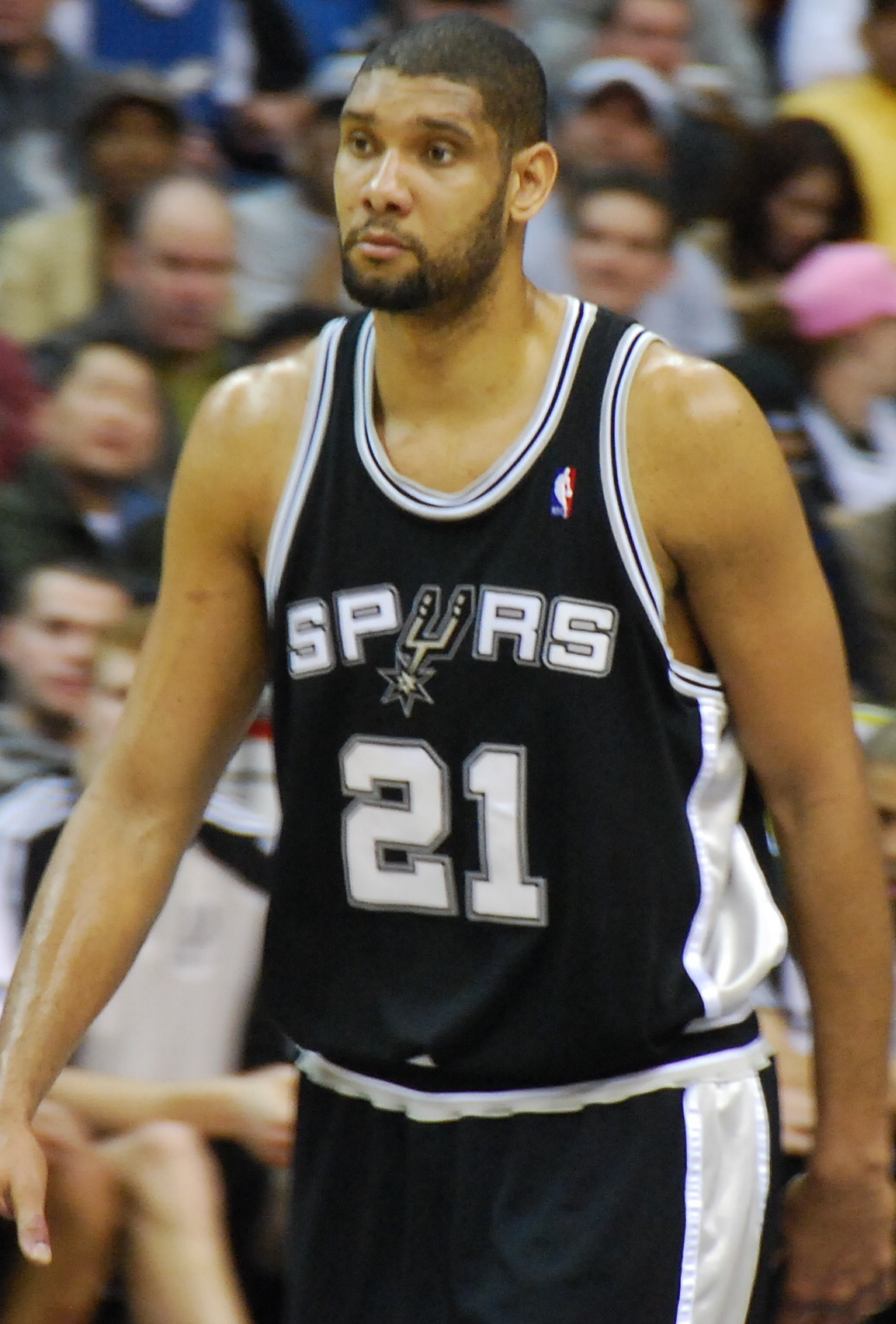
Tim Duncan won five championships with the San Antonio Spurs from 1999 to 2014.

The 2000s were largely dominated by the San Antonio Spurs and Los Angeles Lakers, who appeared in a combined eleven Finals to win nine championships in twelve seasons.

The Spurs won championships in 1999, 2003, 2005, and 2007. During the 1999 NBA playoffs, the Spurs finished with a 15–2 mark. With a defensive squad led by David Robinson and Tim Duncan, San Antonio's 84.7 points allowed per game was the fewest average points allowed in the postseason in the last 30 years. In the Finals, the Spurs held the New York Knicks, the first 8-seed team to reach the Finals in NBA history, to an average of 79.8 points per game. During the 2003 NBA Finals, the Spurs defeated the New Jersey Nets in six games, which also marked the first championship contested between two former ABA teams. In Game 6, Duncan was two blocks short of recording the first quadruple-double in NBA Finals history, finishing with 21 points, 20 rebounds, 10 assists, and 8 blocks. The Spurs also defeated the Detroit Pistons 4–3 in 2005 and swept the LeBron James-led Cleveland Cavaliers in 2007. Tony Parker won the Finals MVP award in 2007, becoming the first European-born player to do so.

The Lakers won five championships in an 11-year span, including a three-peat from 2000 to 2002, led by Shaquille O'Neal and Kobe Bryant. Most notably, during their 2001 postseason run, the Lakers swept their first three series and won the Finals against the Allen Iverson-led Philadelphia 76ers in five games, finishing with an unprecedented 15–1 record, the best postseason record in NBA history at the time. The Lakers also defeated the Indiana Pacers in 2000, and swept the New Jersey Nets in 2002.

In the 2003 off-season, veteran stars Gary Payton and Karl Malone signed with the Lakers. Along with Bryant and O'Neal, they formed what many expected to be one of the best teams in NBA history and were heavy favorites to win the championship in 2004. However, the Detroit Pistons, coached by Larry Brown, defeated the Lakers in five games. Now established as one of the powerhouses of the East, the Pistons returned to the NBA Finals the following year, losing to the Spurs in seven games.

Following bad blood and eventual fallout with former Lakers teammate Kobe Bryant, O'Neal was traded from the Lakers to the Miami Heat in 2004, where he teamed up with rising star Dwyane Wade. Together they led the Heat to a championship in 2006 at the expense of the Dallas Mavericks, who were favorites to win, after trailing 0–2 in the series.

The Lakers returned to the Finals in 2008 against the Boston Celtics, renewing the teams' rivalry marking the 11th Finals matchup between them. The Celtics defeated the Lakers in six games, led by their "Big Three" superstars of Ray Allen, Kevin Garnett, and Paul Pierce. The Lakers bounced back from the loss by winning the 2009 NBA Finals, where they beat Orlando Magic in five games. The Lakers met the Celtics once again in 2010, trailing 3–2 before winning the last two games at home. Head coach Phil Jackson surpassed Red Auerbach's record for most NBA titles of all time with eleven.

=== 2010s: Heat Wave and the Warriors dynasty ===
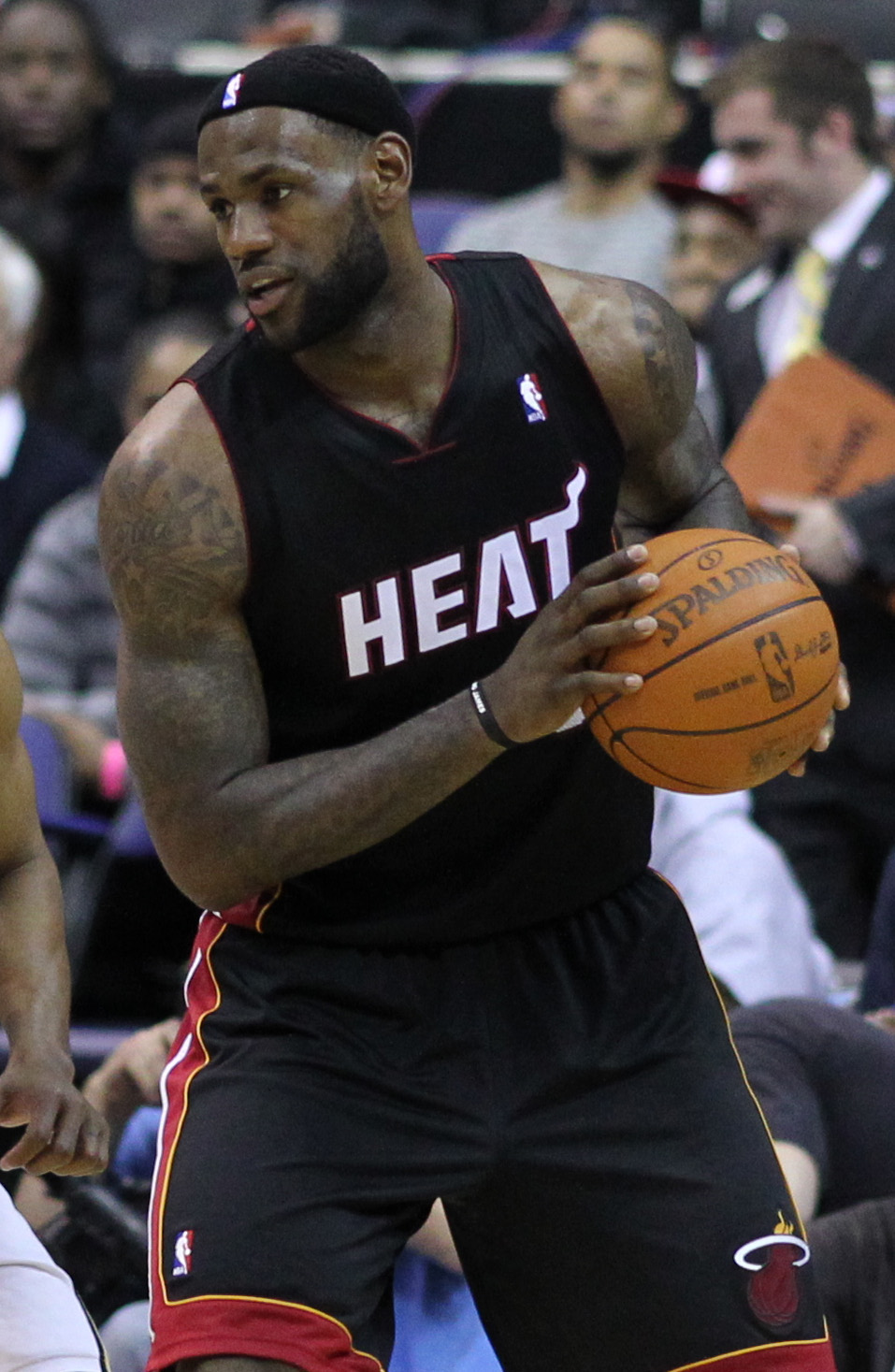
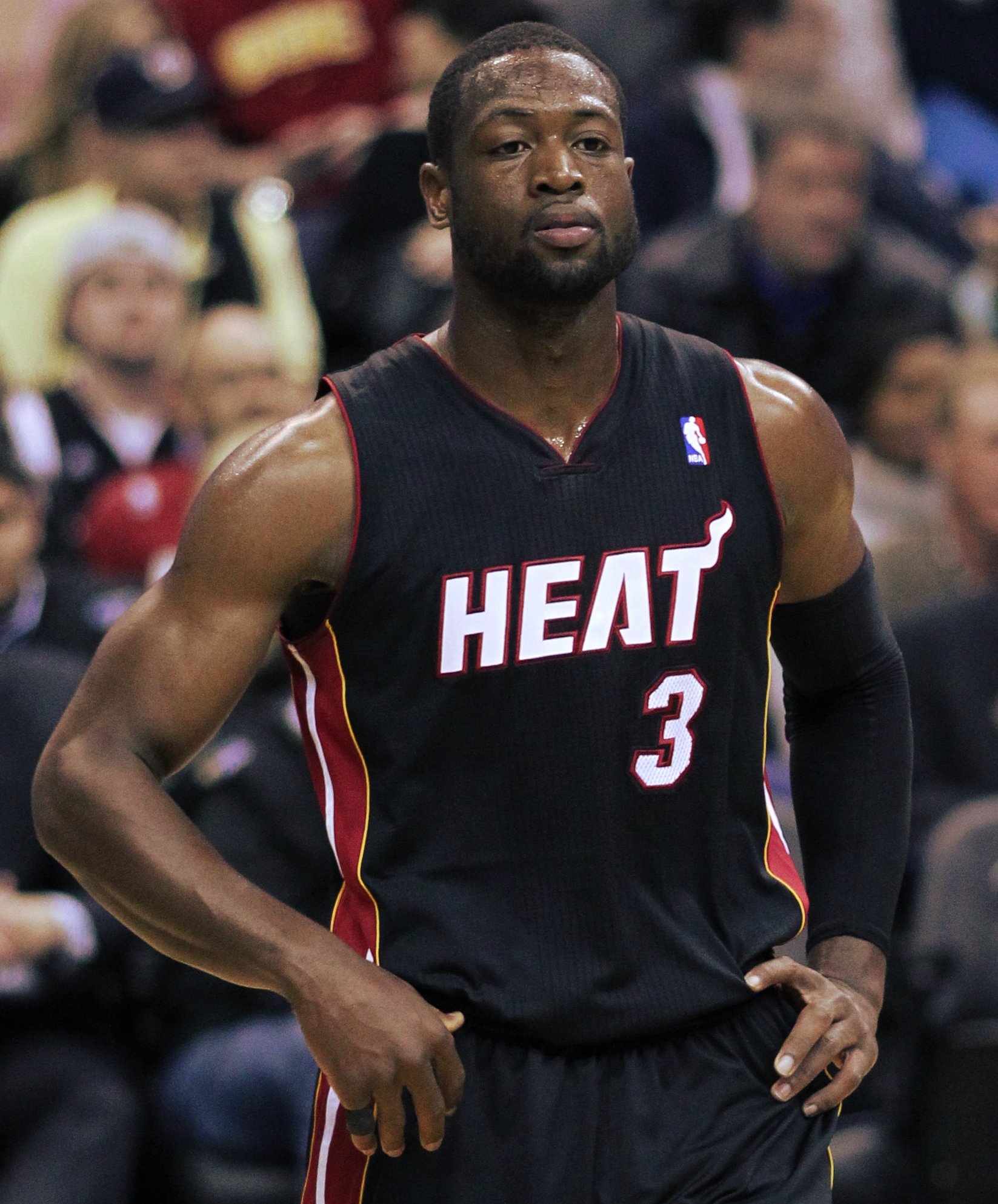
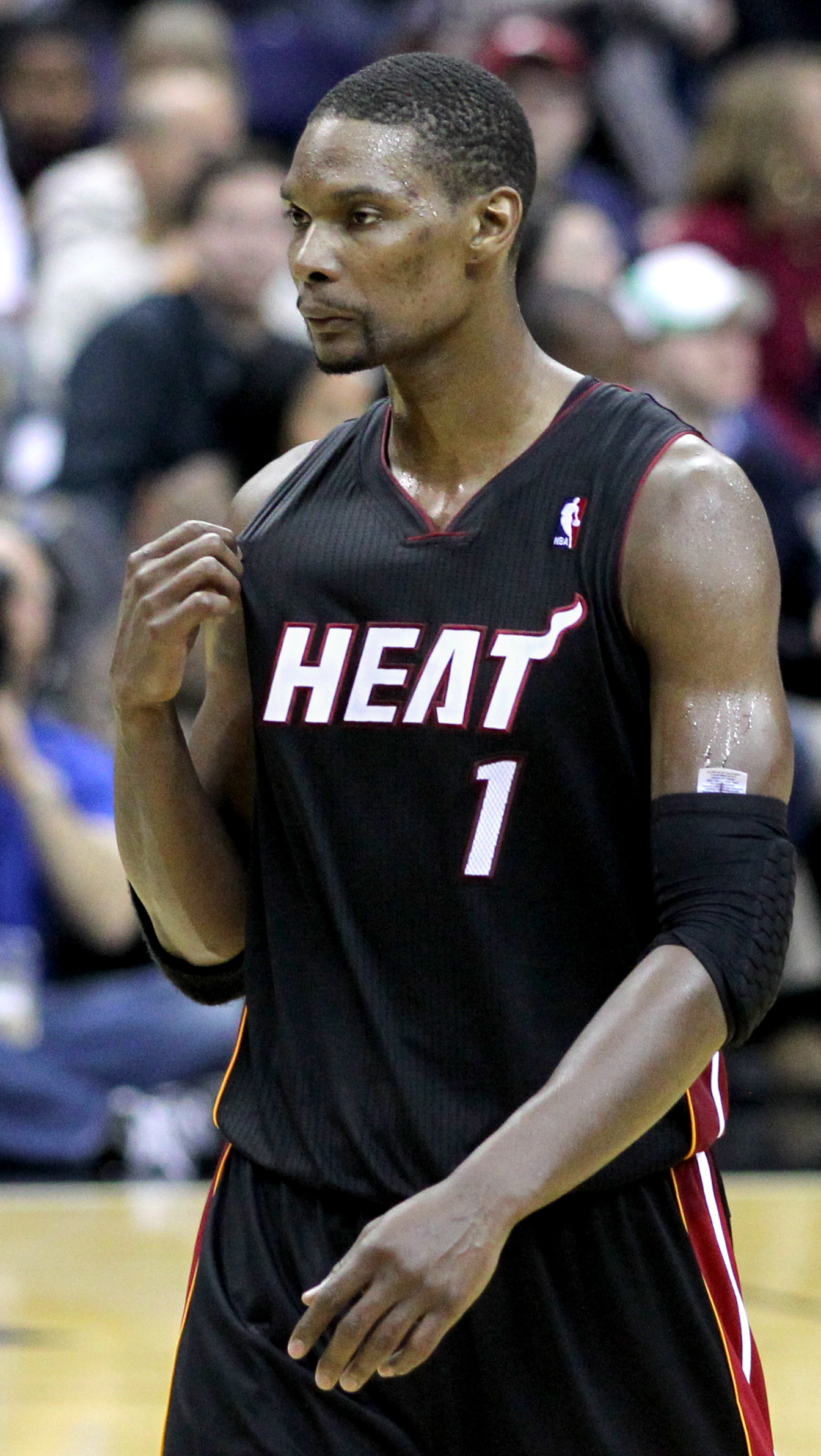
LeBron James (left) and Chris Bosh (right) joined Dwyane Wade (center) on the Miami Heat to form the Big Three.

The Golden State Warriors won four championships in an eight-year stretch from 2015 to 2022. LeBron James also led three separate teams to championships in this period, appearing in nine out of ten Finals from 2011 to 2020.

During the 2010 off-season, the Miami Heat re-signed team captain Dwyane Wade and added James and Chris Bosh via free agency to form a new "Big Three." The Heat were subsequently considered heavy title favorites and appeared in four straight finals, starting in 2011 against the Dallas Mavericks. Despite being heavy underdogs on paper, the Mavericks won the series in six games. Dirk Nowitzki of Dallas was named Finals MVP, becoming the first and only German to do so.

The Heat returned to the Finals in the following year against a young Oklahoma City Thunder team featuring future MVPs Russell Westbrook, James Harden, and Kevin Durant. Miami won the series in five games, with James winning his first championship. The Heat repeated as champions in 2013, this time over the San Antonio Spurs, featuring a Heat comeback in Game 6 that is widely regarded one of the greatest playoff games ever played. Miami sought a three-peat in a 2014 rematch with the Spurs, but this time San Antonio prevailed in five games, winning the fifth and final title of Tim Duncan's career.

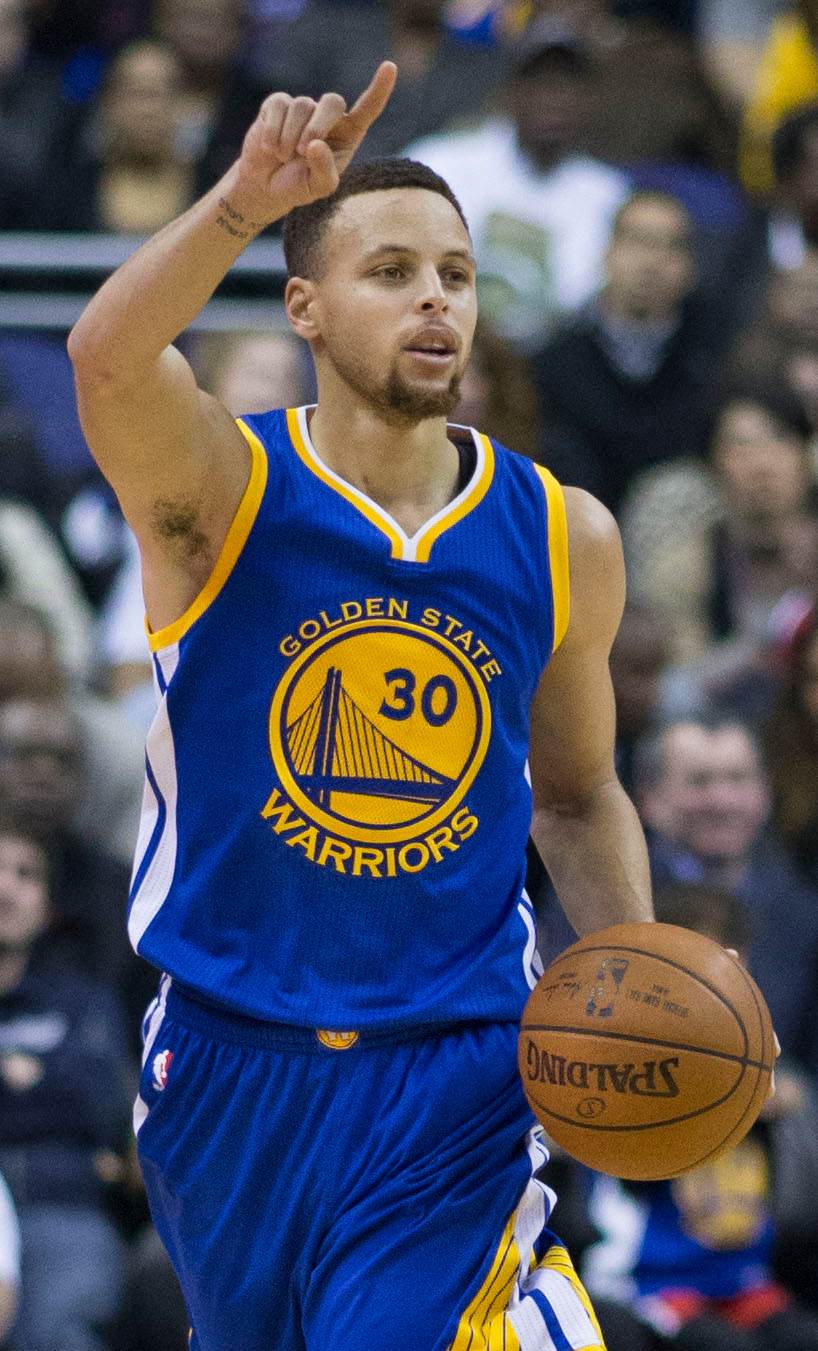
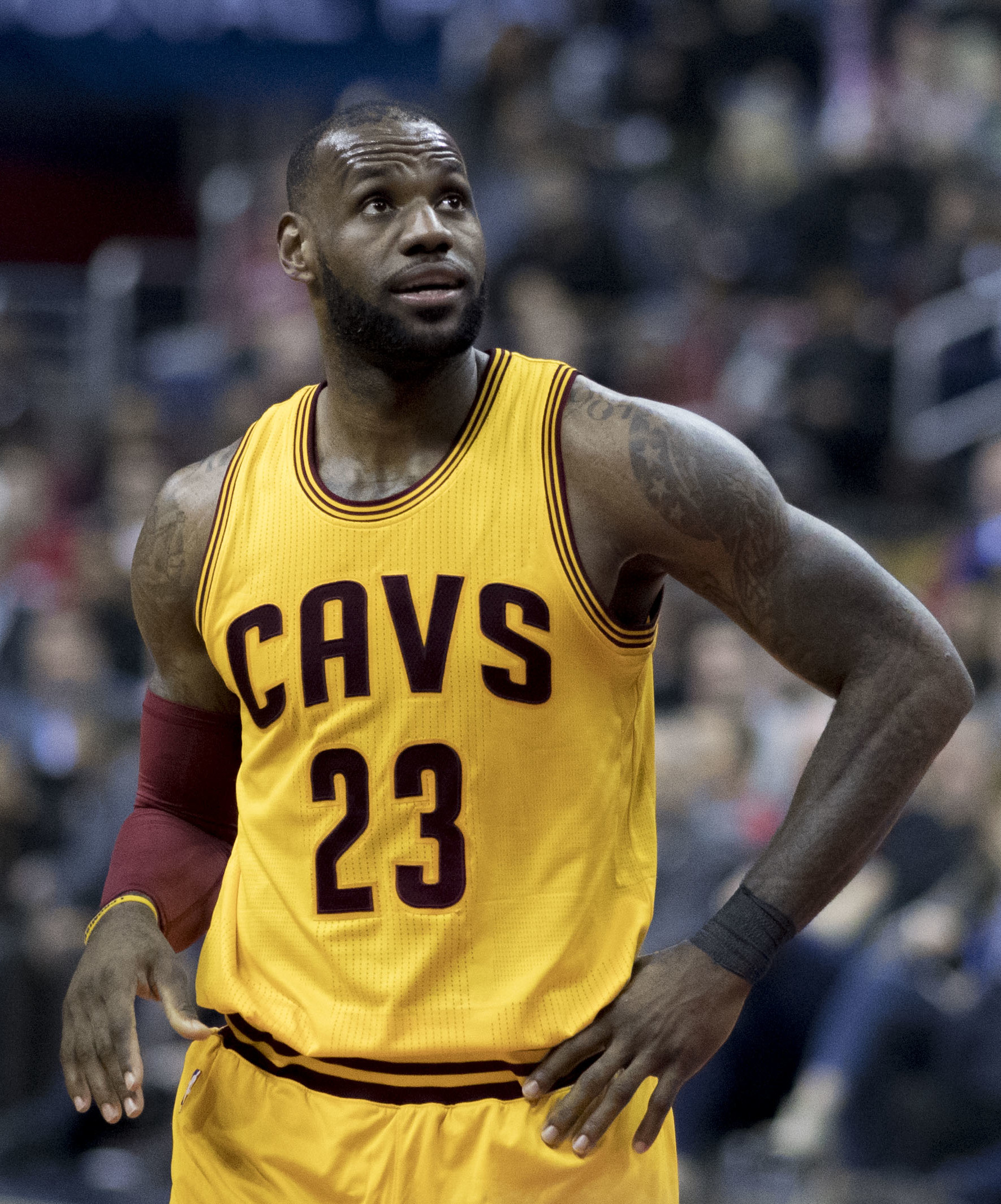
Stephen Curry (left) and LeBron James (right) each won four NBA titles and competed against one another in four straight Finals from 2015 to 2018.

In the 2014 off-season, James returned to the Cleveland Cavaliers where he teamed up with Kyrie Irving and Kevin Love to form a new "Big Three". The Cavaliers appeared in the next four Finals, all against the Golden State Warriors. The Cavaliers and Warriors became the first two teams to square off in more than two consecutive Finals. The Warriors drew first blood in the 2015 NBA Finals, coming back from a 2–1 deficit to win the series 4–2, despite James' historic efforts. The following season, the Warriors broke the record for most regular season wins with a record of 73–9. The Warriors opened up a 3–1 series lead in the 2016 NBA Finals, but James and Irving led the Cavaliers to two straight victories to force a deciding Game 7. In a key sequence with two minutes remaining in Game 7, LeBron James made a memorable chase-down block on Iguodala to keep the game tied, while Irving hit a 3-point shot a minute later to take the lead. Cleveland held on to win the title and end the city's championship drought.

In the subsequent off-season, the Warriors acquired Kevin Durant through free agency, forming what many considered to be one of the greatest teams ever assembled. In 2017, the Warriors set a playoff record of 15 consecutive wins en route to a five-game victory in the Finals, followed by a dominant sweep in 2018. The Warriors made their fifth consecutive Finals appearance in 2019 against the Kawhi Leonard-led Toronto Raptors. Toronto prevailed in six games after season-ending injuries to stars Kevin Durant and Klay Thompson, resulting in the first NBA title for a team based outside the United States.

=== 2020s: Second decade of parity ===
Between 2019 and 2026, eight different franchises won championships in eight seasons, the longest streak of non-consecutive winners in NBA history.

LeBron James and Anthony Davis led the Los Angeles Lakers to victory in the 2020 NBA Finals against the Miami Heat. The Lakers claimed their 17th title to tie the Boston Celtics' franchise record, and James won his fourth Finals MVP honors, becoming the first player to win the award with three different franchises.

The Milwaukee Bucks defeated the Phoenix Suns in the 2021 NBA Finals, coming back from an 0-2 deficit to win in six games. It was the first Finals since 1971 to feature no players who had previously won a championship.

After missing the playoffs two years in a row due to injuries and roster changes, the Golden State Warriors returned to the 2022 NBA Finals for their sixth appearance in eight seasons. They defeated the Boston Celtics in six games for their fourth championship in eight seasons.

The Denver Nuggets reached their first Finals in franchise history in 2023, defeating the Miami Heat, the second eighth-seeded team to ever make the Finals, in five games. Nikola Jokić was named Finals MVP, becoming the lowest-drafted player (41st overall) to win the award.

The Boston Celtics defeated the Dallas Mavericks in 2024, breaking their tie with the Lakers franchise to claim their NBA-record 18th title.

The Oklahoma City Thunder defeated the Indiana Pacers in seven games in 2025, marking the seventh unique champion in as many years, breaking the NBA record for most non-consecutive winners.

The New York Knicks defeated the San Antonio Spurs in five games in 2026, including a 29-point comeback win in game 4 that marked the largest in Finals history. The Knicks extended the NBA-record stretch to eight different champions in eight consecutive seasons.

== Sponsorship ==
Internet television service YouTube TV was the presenting sponsor of the NBA Finals from 2018 to 2025, and the series was branded during those years as the NBA Finals presented by YouTube TV.

== Team records ==
=== Finals appearances ===
The statistics below refer to series wins and losses, not individual games won and lost. For individual game statistics, see Individual games records.

No.	Team	W	L	Win%	Most recent appearance	Most recent title	Notes
32	Minneapolis/Los Angeles Lakers	17	15	.531	2020	2020	5–1 in Minneapolis and 12–14 in Los Angeles. Currently hold the record for the most appearances in the NBA Finals and have appeared in the Finals in every decade since the 1940s. They also attained a three-peat in Minneapolis from 1952 to 1954, and another in Los Angeles from 2000 to 2002. The Lakers have defeated nine different NBA franchises in the NBA Finals and lost to five, both records. One of five franchises to reach four consecutive NBA Finals.
23	Boston Celtics	18	5	.783	2024	2024	Won eight straight titles from 1959 to 1966, and are the most successful team in the NBA Finals, winning 18 championships. Three of their five Finals losses occurred against the rival Lakers. Appeared in a record 10 consecutive NBA Finals.
12	Philadelphia/San Francisco/Golden State Warriors	7	5	.583	2022	2022	2–1 in Philadelphia and 5–4 in California. Won the first championship and another title in Philadelphia, before eventually winning five more as the Golden State Warriors, including four in eight years between 2015 and 2022. Second franchise to appear in five consecutive NBA Finals.
9	Syracuse Nationals/Philadelphia 76ers	3	6	.333	2001	1983	1–2 in Syracuse and 2–4 in Philadelphia. Won one title in Syracuse, before winning another two following the move to Philadelphia. Five of their six losses occurred against the Lakers.
9	New York Knicks	3	6	.333	2026	2026	In their 1999 appearance, they became the first 8-seed to ever reach the Finals. Five of their appearances and two of their titles occurred against the Lakers.
7	San Antonio Spurs	5	2	.714	2026	2014	All five titles were with Tim Duncan and Gregg Popovich. They were the first franchise to move from the ABA to the NBA, and subsequently win a championship.
7	Fort Wayne/Detroit Pistons	3	4	.429	2005	2004	0–2 in Fort Wayne and 3–2 in Detroit. Appeared in three straight NBA Finals, winning back-to-back in 1989 and 1990. Both losses in Detroit came in Game 7s.
7	Miami Heat	3	4	.429	2023	2013	Udonis Haslem featured in all Finals appearances. Coach Erik Spoelstra featured in six Finals as head coach and one finals as assistant coach. One of five franchises to reach four consecutive Finals. In their most recent appearance, they became the first team to reach the Finals after qualifying in the play-in tournament.
6	Chicago Bulls	6	0	1.000	1998	1998	All six titles were with head coach Phil Jackson and players Michael Jordan and Scottie Pippen. The titles were won via two three-peats, in 1991–1993 and 1996–1998. They are the only active NBA franchise with multiple Finals appearances and no losses.
5	Cleveland Cavaliers	1	4	.200	2018	2016	LeBron James featured in all five Finals appearances. The Cavaliers appeared in four straight Finals from 2015 to 2018, all against the Golden State Warriors, winning in 2016. One of five franchises to reach four consecutive Finals.
5	Seattle SuperSonics/Oklahoma City Thunder	2	3	.400	2025	2025	1–2 as Seattle SuperSonics and 1–1 as Oklahoma City Thunder. They remain the only franchise since 1977 to win a title in one city and later relocate.
4	Houston Rockets	2	2	.500	1995	1995	Won back-to-back championships with Hakeem Olajuwon and coach Rudy Tomjanovich. Their 1995 triumph was done as the 6-seed, the lowest seeded team in NBA History to win a championship. Both losses against the Boston Celtics.
4	St. Louis/Atlanta Hawks	1	3	.250	1961	1958	All appearances when the team was in St. Louis. Reached four NBA Finals in five years, all against the Boston Celtics.
4	Baltimore/Washington Bullets/Washington Wizards	1	3	.250	1979	1978	0–1 as the Baltimore Bullets, and 1–2 as the Washington Bullets. All appearances in the Finals came between 1971 and 1979, featuring Wes Unseld.
3	Milwaukee Bucks	2	1	.667	2021	2021	Won in the 1971 and 2021 Finals. 1971 and 1974 appearances were by teams that featured Oscar Robertson and Kareem Abdul-Jabbar.
3	Portland Trail Blazers	1	2	.333	1992	1977	Their only title was won with Bill Walton. The team lost two finals with Clyde Drexler.
3	Dallas Mavericks	1	2	.333	2024	2011	1-1 against the Miami Heat and 0-1 against the Boston Celtics. First championship team led by Dirk Nowitzki.
3	Phoenix Suns	0	3	.000	2021	None	Lost in the 1976, 1993 and 2021 Finals to the Celtics, Bulls and Bucks, respectively. Best historical win–loss record and most Finals appearances amongst all franchises to have not won a title.
2	Utah Jazz	0	2	.000	1998	None	Both appearances were with coach Jerry Sloan and players Karl Malone and John Stockton, and losses to the Bulls in six games.
2	New Jersey/Brooklyn Nets	0	2	.000	2003	None	All appearances when the team was in New Jersey.
2	Orlando Magic	0	2	.000	2009	None	They lost both of their Finals appearances, winning just one game between the two series.
2	Indiana Pacers	0	2	.000	2025	None	First appearance in 2000 was led by Reggie Miller and coach Larry Bird, losing to Shaquille O'Neal, Kobe Bryant and the Lakers. Second appearance in 2025 was led by Tyrese Haliburton
1	Baltimore Bullets	1	0	1.000	1948	1948	Team folded in 1954 and is the only championship-winning team to fold.
1	Rochester Royals/Kansas City/Sacramento Kings	1	0	1.000	1951	1951	Only appearance in NBA Finals as the Rochester Royals.
1	Toronto Raptors	1	0	1.000	2019	2019	Only appearance in NBA Finals. The first and only team based outside the United States to win an NBA title or reach the NBA Finals.
1	Denver Nuggets	1	0	1.000	2023	2023	Only appearance as of 2023.
1	Chicago Stags	0	1	.000	1947	None	Team folded in 1950.
1	Washington Capitols	0	1	.000	1949	None	Team folded in 1951.

=== Active franchises with no Finals appearance ===
Team	No. of seasons	Founded	Other achievements
Buffalo Braves/San Diego/Los Angeles Clippers	56	1970	Reached the Western Conference finals in 2021. Oldest active franchise with no Finals appearance.
Minnesota Timberwolves	37	1989	Reached the Western Conference finals in 2004, 2024, and 2025.
Charlotte Bobcats/Hornets*	36	1988	Never reached the Eastern Conference finals. Reached the second round four times, in 1993, 1998, 2001, and 2002.
Vancouver/Memphis Grizzlies	31	1995	Reached the Western Conference finals in 2013.
New Orleans/Oklahoma City Hornets/Pelicans*	24	2002	Never reached the Western Conference finals. Reached the second round twice, in 2008 and 2018.

(*) As a result of the original Hornets franchise's relocation to New Orleans, the NBA team in Charlotte suspended operations for the 2002–03 and the 2003–04 seasons, before a new team, named the Bobcats, was established for the 2004–05 season. In 2013, the original Hornets were renamed the Pelicans and retained the history and records during their time in New Orleans and Oklahoma City from 2002 to 2013. In 2014, the Bobcats became the second incarnation of the Charlotte Hornets, and obtained the history and records of the Hornets organization from 1988 to 2002.

=== Individual games records ===
No.	Team	W	L	Win%	Notes
185	Los Angeles Lakers	93	92	.503	Holds the record for the most games in the Finals, with a record of 20–15 in Minneapolis and 73–77 while in Los Angeles. Won 4–2 in their last Finals appearance in 2020.
134	Boston Celtics	81	53	.604	Recorded the first ever sweep in the Finals. Won 4–1 in their last Finals appearance in 2024.
65	Golden State Warriors	38	27	.585	Includes records of 10–6 while in Philadelphia, 3–8 while in San Francisco, and 25–13 in their current incarnation. Won 4–2 in their last Finals appearance in 2022.
53	Philadelphia 76ers	24	29	.453	Includes a record of 9–11 while in Syracuse, and 15–18 while in Philadelphia. Lost 4–1 in their last Finals appearance in 2001.
53	New York Knicks	24	29	.453	Won 4–1 in their last Finals appearance in 2026.
41	Miami Heat	18	23	.439	Lost 4–1 in their last Finals appearance in 2023.
40	Detroit Pistons	22	18	.550	Includes a record of 4–8 while in Fort Wayne, and 18–10 while in Detroit. Lost 4–3 their last Finals appearance in 2005.
39	San Antonio Spurs	24	15	.615	Lost 4–1 in their last Finals appearance in 2026.
35	Chicago Bulls	24	11	.686	Won 4–2 in their last Finals appearance in 1998.
30	Seattle SuperSonics/Oklahoma City Thunder	14	16	.467	Includes a record of 9–9 while in Seattle, and 5–7 while in Oklahoma City. Won 4–3 in their last Finals appearance in 2025.
26	Cleveland Cavaliers	7	19	.269	Lost 4–0 in their last Finals appearance in 2018, as well as becoming the only team in the Finals to overcome a 3–1 deficit in 2016.
25	Atlanta Hawks	11	14	.440	All appearances in the Finals occurred while the team was in St. Louis.
23	Houston Rockets	12	11	.522	Won 4–0 in their last Finals appearance in 1995.
20	Washington Wizards	5	15	.250	Includes a record of 0–4 in Baltimore and 5–11 in Washington, all as the Bullets.
18	Phoenix Suns	6	12	.333	Lost 4–2 in their last Finals appearance in 2021.
17	Milwaukee Bucks	11	6	.647	Won 4–2 in their last Finals appearance in 2021.
17	Portland Trail Blazers	7	10	.412	Lost 4–2 in their last Finals appearance in 1992.
17	Dallas Mavericks	7	10	.412	Lost 4–1 in their last Finals appearance in 2024.
13	Indiana Pacers	5	8	.385	Lost 4-3 in their last Finals appearance in 2025.
12	Utah Jazz	4	8	.333	Lost 4–2 in both Finals appearances in 1997 and 1998, both times against the Bulls.
10	Brooklyn Nets	2	8	.200	All Finals appearances have occurred while the team was in New Jersey, and lost 4–2 in their last Finals appearance in 2003.
9	Orlando Magic	1	8	.111	Lost 4–1 in their last Finals appearance in 2009.
7	Sacramento Kings	4	3	.571	All appearances have occurred while the team was in Rochester.
6	Baltimore Bullets	4	2	.667	Franchise defunct. Only championship-winning team to fold.
6	Toronto Raptors	4	2	.667	Won 4–2 in their only Finals appearance in 2019.
6	Washington Capitols	2	4	.333	Franchise defunct.
5	Denver Nuggets	4	1	.800	Won 4–1 in their only Finals appearance in 2023.
5	Chicago Stags	1	4	.200	Franchise defunct.

== Player records ==
Career

- Most years in Finals (12) – Bill Russell
- Most games played in Finals (70) – Bill Russell
- Most career points in Finals (1,679) – Jerry West
- Most career assists in Finals (584) – Magic Johnson
- Most career rebounds in Finals (1,718) – Bill Russell
- Most career blocks in Finals (116) – Kareem Abdul-Jabbar
- Most career steals in Finals (102) – Magic Johnson
- Most career turnovers in Finals (196) – LeBron James
- Most career three-point field goals in Finals (152) – Stephen Curry
- Most career free throws made in Finals (453) – Jerry West

Series

- Most points, one series (284) – Elgin Baylor (1962)
- Most assists, one series (95) – Magic Johnson (1984)
- Most rebounds, one series (189) – Bill Russell (1962)
- Most blocks, one series (32) – Tim Duncan (2003)
- Most steals, one series (20) – Isiah Thomas (1988)
- Most turnovers, one series (31) – Magic Johnson (1984) and LeBron James (2016)
- Most three-point field goals, one series (32) – Stephen Curry (2016)
- Most free throws made, one series (82) – Elgin Baylor (1962)

Game

- Most points, one game (61) – Elgin Baylor (1962)
- Most assists, one game (21) – Magic Johnson (1984)
- Most rebounds, one game (40) – 2x Bill Russell (1960) and (1962)
- Most blocks, one game (9) – Dwight Howard (2009)
- Most steals, one game (7) – Robert Horry (1995)
- Most turnovers, one game (10) – Magic Johnson (1980)
- Most three-point field goals, one game (9) – Stephen Curry (2018)
- Most free throws made, one game (21) – Dwyane Wade (2006)

Total points (finals)

1. Jerry West – 1,679
2. LeBron James – 1,562
3. Kareem Abdul-Jabbar – 1,317
4. Michael Jordan – 1,176
5. Elgin Baylor – 1,161
6. Bill Russell – 1,151
7. Sam Jones – 1,143
8. Tom Heinsohn – 1,037
9. John Havlicek – 1,020
10. Magic Johnson – 971

PPG average (min 10 games) (finals)

1. Rick Barry – 36.3
2. Michael Jordan – 33.6
3. Jerry West – 30.5
4. Kevin Durant – 30.3
5. Shaquille O'Neal – 28.8
6. LeBron James – 28.4
7. Bob Pettit – 28.4
8. Hakeem Olajuwon – 27.5
9. Stephen Curry – 27.3
10. Elgin Baylor – 26.4

== Media coverage ==
Since 2003, ABC has exclusively aired the NBA Finals. As part of a sublicensing agreement, TNT Sports produces Inside the NBA, the studio show that formerly aired on the TNT channel, which aired during the Finals for the first time in 2026.

== See also ==
- List of NBA champions
- List of NBA championship head coaches
- List of NBA players with most championships
- List of NBA Finals broadcasters
- NBA Finals television ratings
