= Kareem Abdul-Jabbar Social Justice Champion =

Annual NBA award

Kareem Abdul-Jabbar Social Justice Champion Award
- Sport: Basketball
- League: National Basketball Association
- Awarded for: NBA player making greatest strides in fight for social justice

History
- First award: 2020–21
- Most recent: Bam Adebayo; Miami Heat

The Kareem Abdul-Jabbar Social Justice Champion is an annual National Basketball Association (NBA) award which honors players who are making strides in the fight for social justice. The award was created in 2021 and named after Kareem Abdul-Jabbar, a six-time NBA champion whose involvement with social issues dates back to the civil rights movement. All 30 teams nominate one player from their roster to be the Kareem Abdul-Jabbar Social Justice Champion, then the finalists and winner will be selected by a committee composed of NBA legends, league executives and social justice leaders. The winner selects an organization which will receive a $100,000 contribution on their behalf. The other fours finalists choose an organization to receive $25,000. The award is similar to the National Football League's Walter Payton Man of the Year Award, in which every team names a nominee who excelled in charity work.

After the 2020–21 season, Carmelo Anthony was named the inaugural winner of the award.

== Winners ==
Season	Player	Position	Nationality	Team	Ref
2020–21	Carmelo Anthony	Forward	United States	Portland Trail Blazers	
2021–22	Reggie Bullock	Forward	United States	Dallas Mavericks	
2022–23	Stephen Curry	Guard	United States	Golden State Warriors	
2023–24	Karl-Anthony Towns	Forward	Dominican Republic	Minnesota Timberwolves	
2024–25	Jrue Holiday	Guard	United States	Boston Celtics	
2025–26	Bam Adebayo	Center	United States	Miami Heat	

== See also ==
- List of NBA regular season records
