= Walter A. Brown Trophy =

National Basketball Association trophy

Walter A Brown Championship Trophy
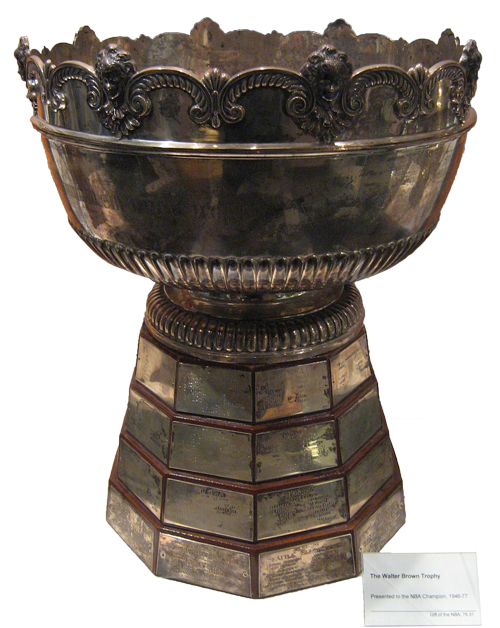
- The original Walter A. Brown Trophy
- Sport: Basketball
- Competition: NBA Playoffs
- Awarded for: Winning the NBA Finals

History
- First award: 1947
- Final award: 1976
- First winner: Philadelphia Warriors
- Most wins: Boston Celtics (13)
- Most recent: Boston Celtics (1975-76)
- Website: NBA.com

The Walter A. Brown Trophy is a retired basketball championship trophy. It was initially awarded annually by the Basketball Association of America (BAA) to the winner of the BAA Finals from 1946 to 1949. After the BAA merged with the National Basketball League (NBL) to form the National Basketball Association (NBA), the trophy was awarded annually to the winner of the NBA Finals from 1950 to 1976. The trophy is named in honor of Walter A. Brown, the original owner of the Boston Celtics who was instrumental in the BAA–NBL merger. The NBA then retired the Walter A. Brown Trophy and established the Larry O'Brien Championship Trophy for 1977.

== History ==
The original trophy was awarded to the BAA/NBA champions from 1947 to 1976. The trophy was loaned by the winning team for one year and given to the winning team of the following year's Finals, unless the previous team won again, much like the NHL's Stanley Cup, which continues that tradition to this day. The trophy was given its name in 1964 after Walter A. Brown, the original owner of the Boston Celtics who was instrumental in merging the BAA and the National Basketball League into the NBA in 1949. Boston Celtics were the final winners of the original Trophy in 1976. A new trophy design was created for the 1977 NBA Finals, though under the name "World Championship Trophy" before being renamed renamed the Larry O'Brien Championship Trophy in 1984 to honor the then recently retired NBA commissioner Larry O'Brien. Unlike the original championship trophy, the new trophy was given permanently to the winning team and a new one being made each season. For the most part in contemporary league media, championship wins in the Brown Trophy era are represented visually by the O'Brien Trophy instead for the purposes of simplicity.

== Winners ==
The inaugural winners of the trophy were the Philadelphia Warriors, who defeated the Chicago Stags. From 1957 to 1969, the Celtics won the NBA Finals 11 out of 13 times including eight consecutive times from 1959 to 1966. The final winners of the trophy were the Boston Celtics, who defeated the Phoenix Suns in the 1976 NBA Finals.

== By franchise ==
This table lists the 9 teams that have won the Walter A. Brown Championship Trophy since it was introduced in 1946 until it was awarded for the final time in 1976.

Team	Trophies	BAA/NBA Finals Champions
Boston Celtics	13	1957, 1959, 1960, 1961, 1962, 1963, 1964, 1965, 1966, 1968, 1969, 1974, 1976
Minneapolis/Los Angeles Lakers	6	1949, 1950, 1952, 1953, 1954, 1972
Philadelphia/Golden State Warriors	3	1947, 1956, 1975
New York Knicks	2	1970, 1973
Syracuse Nationals/Philadelphia 76ers	2	1955, 1967
Baltimore Bullets†	1	1948
Milwaukee Bucks	1	1971
Rochester Royals	1	1951
St. Louis Hawks	1	1958

† = Defunct
