= 1977 NBA Finals =

North America basketball championship

Team	Coach	Wins
Portland Trail Blazers	Jack Ramsay	4
Philadelphia 76ers	Gene Shue	2
- Dates: May 22 – June 5
- MVP: Bill Walton (Portland Trail Blazers)
- Hall of Famers: 76ers: Doug Collins (2024); Julius Erving (1993); George McGinnis (2017); Trail Blazers: Bill Walton (1993); Coaches: Jack Ramsay (1992); Officials: Darell Garretson (2016); Earl Strom (1995)
- Eastern finals: 76ers defeated Rockets, 4–2
- Western finals: Trail Blazers defeated Lakers, 4–0

The 1977 NBA World Championship Series was the championship round of the National Basketball Association's (NBA) 1976–77 season, and the culmination of the season's playoffs. The Western Conference champion Portland Trail Blazers played against the Eastern Conference champion Philadelphia 76ers, with the 76ers holding home-court advantage. Their four regular season meetings had been split evenly, 2–2, with neither side winning away from home. The series was played under a best-of-seven format. The Trail Blazers overcame a two-games-to-none series deficit to defeat the 76ers in six games, winning their first (and still only) championship in franchise history. This was the first NBA Finals in which the winning team was presented the Larry O'Brien Trophy.

The 1976–77 NBA season started with the ABA–NBA merger. Portland had benefited from the resulting ABA dispersal draft as they acquired Spirits of St. Louis power forward Maurice Lucas to partner with Bill Walton, and Philadelphia had signed ABA All-Star and 3-time ABA MVP Julius "Dr. J" Erving, who had taken the New York Nets to the ABA title the previous year. In the 1977 NBA Finals, five of the ten starting players were former ABA players (Julius Erving, Caldwell Jones, George McGinnis, Dave Twardzik, and Maurice Lucas).

While it was no surprise that Philadelphia had made it to the championship series, having posted the best record in the Eastern Conference (50–32), Portland's appearance in the finals was a mild surprise. Portland had joined the league in 1970 and it was making its playoff debut in its seventh season as the third best team in the Western Conference (49–33). It was also making its Finals debut after sweeping the Los Angeles Lakers in four close games in the Western Conference finals to make this the second straight NBA Finals with at least one team making their first Finals appearance.

The series started 2–0 in favor of Philadelphia, but Portland rebounded in the next four games to become the second team to overcome a 2–0 deficit to win the Finals since the Boston Celtics in 1969 and the first to do so with four straight wins. The 1976-77 Trail Blazers were the last team to accomplish this feat until the Miami Heat did so in 2006.

== Background ==
The Portland Trail Blazers franchise entered the NBA as an expansion team in 1970, along with the Cleveland Cavaliers and the Buffalo Braves. Like most expansion teams, the Trail Blazers struggled, but in 1974, hope was on the way.

Superstar center Bill Walton, who led UCLA to an 86–4 record and two national titles in three years, was drafted first overall by the Trail Blazers in the 1974 NBA draft. The Trail Blazers missed the playoffs the next two seasons as Walton struggled with injuries, but continued to add key pieces, such as Dave Twardzik, Lloyd Neal, Lionel Hollins, and Maurice Lucas. In 1976, Jack Ramsay was hired as head coach, and with a fully healthy Walton, Portland made the playoffs for the first time in the 1976–77 season, winning 49 games. The 3rd seeded Blazers would defeat the Chicago Bulls in three games, the Denver Nuggets in six games, and then shockingly swept league MVP Kareem Abdul-Jabbar and the top-seeded Los Angeles Lakers in the conference finals.

The Philadelphia 76ers made it back to the playoffs in 1976, after missing the previous four years, which included a league-worst nine wins in the 1972–73 season. They acquired former ABA All-Star Julius Erving, late of the New York Nets, in the offseason. The 76ers won 50 games for the first time since 1969, defeated the defending champion Boston Celtics in a tough seven-game series, then advanced to the finals for the first time since 1967 by ousting the Houston Rockets in six games.

Jack Ramsay was a Philadelphia native and a former coach of the 79ers from 1968–1972.

=== Road to the Finals ===
Portland Trail Blazers (Western Conference champion)		Philadelphia 76ers (Eastern Conference champion)
# / Western Conference; # / Team / W / L / PCT / GB; 1 / z-Los Angeles Lakers / 53 / 29 / .646 / –; 2 / y-Denver Nuggets / 50 / 32 / .610 / 3; 3 / x-Portland Trail Blazers / 49 / 33 / .598 / 4; 4 / x-Golden State Warriors / 46 / 36 / .561 / 7; 5 / x-Detroit Pistons / 44 / 38 / .537 / 9; 6 / x-Chicago Bulls / 44 / 38 / .537 / 9; 7 / Kansas City Kings / 40 / 42 / .488 / 13; 8 / Seattle SuperSonics / 40 / 42 / .488 / 13; 9 / Indiana Pacers / 36 / 46 / .439 / 17; 10 / Phoenix Suns / 34 / 48 / .415 / 19; 11 / Milwaukee Bucks / 30 / 52 / .366 / 23; 3rd seed in the West, 5th best league record	Regular season	# / Eastern Conference; # / Team / W / L / PCT / GB; 1 / z-Philadelphia 76ers / 50 / 32 / .610 / –; 2 / y-Houston Rockets / 49 / 33 / .598 / 1; 3 / x-Washington Bullets / 48 / 34 / .585 / 2; 4 / x-Boston Celtics / 44 / 38 / .537 / 6; 5 / x-San Antonio Spurs / 44 / 38 / .537 / 6; 6 / x-Cleveland Cavaliers / 43 / 39 / .524 / 7; 7 / New York Knicks / 40 / 42 / .488 / 10; 8 / New Orleans Jazz / 35 / 47 / .427 / 15; 9 / Atlanta Hawks / 31 / 51 / .378 / 19; 10 / Buffalo Braves / 30 / 52 / .366 / 20; 11 / New York Nets / 22 / 60 / .268 / 28; 1st seed in the East, 2nd best league record
Defeated the (6) Chicago Bulls, 2–1	First round	Earned first-round bye
Defeated the (2) Denver Nuggets, 4–2	Conference semifinals	Defeated the (4) Boston Celtics, 4–3
Defeated the (1) Los Angeles Lakers, 4–0	Conference finals	Defeated the (2) Houston Rockets, 4–2

=== Regular season series ===
Both teams split the four-game series, each won by the home team.

November 5, 1976

Philadelphia 76ers 104, Portland Trail Blazers 146

Memorial Coliseum, Portland, Oregon

December 11, 1976

Portland Trail Blazers 107, Philadelphia 76ers 108

The Spectrum, Philadelphia

March 1, 1977

Philadelphia 76ers 107, Portland Trail Blazers 108

Memorial Coliseum, Portland, Oregon

March 27, 1977

Portland Trail Blazers 116, Philadelphia 76ers 128

The Spectrum, Philadelphia

== Team rosters ==
=== Portland Trail Blazers ===
1976–77 Portland Trail Blazers roster
Players

Pos.	No.	Player	Height	Weight	DOB	From
F	10	Corky Calhoun	6 ft 7 in (2.01 m)	210 lb (95 kg)		Penn
G	16	Johnny Davis	6 ft 2 in (1.88 m)	170 lb (77 kg)		Dayton
G	3	Herm Gilliam	6 ft 3 in (1.91 m)	190 lb (86 kg)		Purdue
F	30	Bob Gross	6 ft 6 in (1.98 m)	200 lb (91 kg)		Long Beach State
G	14	Lionel Hollins	6 ft 3 in (1.91 m)	185 lb (84 kg)		Arizona State
F/C	34	Robin Jones	6 ft 9 in (2.06 m)	225 lb (102 kg)		Saint Louis
F	20	Maurice Lucas	6 ft 9 in (2.06 m)	215 lb (98 kg)		Marquette
F	36	Lloyd Neal	6 ft 7 in (2.01 m)	225 lb (102 kg)		Tennessee State
F	15	Larry Steele	6 ft 5 in (1.96 m)	180 lb (82 kg)		Kentucky
G	13	Dave Twardzik	6 ft 1 in (1.85 m)	175 lb (79 kg)		Old Dominion
F	42	Wally Walker	6 ft 7 in (2.01 m)	190 lb (86 kg)		Virginia
C	32	Bill Walton	6 ft 11 in (2.11 m)	210 lb (95 kg)		UCLA

Coaches
Head coach
- Jack Ramsay

Legend
- (DP) Unsigned draft pick
- (FA) Free agent
- (S) Suspended
- Injured

=== Philadelphia 76ers ===
1976–77 Philadelphia 76ers roster
Players

Pos.	No.	Player	Height	Weight	DOB	From
G	10	(United States)	Henry Bibby	6 ft 1 in (1.85 m)	185 lb (84 kg)		UCLA
F	23	(United States)	Joe Bryant	6 ft 9 in (2.06 m)	185 lb (84 kg)		La Salle
F/C	42	(United States)	Harvey Catchings	6 ft 10 in (2.08 m)	218 lb (99 kg)		Hardin–Simmons
G	20	(United States)	Doug Collins	6 ft 6 in (1.98 m)	180 lb (82 kg)		Illinois State
C	53	(United States)	Darryl Dawkins	6 ft 11 in (2.11 m)	251 lb (114 kg)		Maynard Evans HS (FL)
G	10	(United States)	Mike Dunleavy	6 ft 3 in (1.91 m)	180 lb (82 kg)		South Carolina
F	6	(United States)	Julius Erving	6 ft 7 in (2.01 m)	210 lb (95 kg)		UMass
G	21	(United States)	Lloyd Free	6 ft 2 in (1.88 m)	185 lb (84 kg)		Guilford
G	25	(United States)	Terry Furlow	6 ft 4 in (1.93 m)	190 lb (86 kg)		Michigan State
C	11	(United States)	Caldwell Jones	6 ft 11 in (2.11 m)	217 lb (98 kg)		Albany State
F	30	(United States)	George McGinnis	6 ft 8 in (2.03 m)	235 lb (107 kg)		Indiana
F	50	(United States)	Steve Mix	6 ft 7 in (2.01 m)	215 lb (98 kg)		Toledo

Coaches
Head coach
- Gene Shue

Legend
- (DP) Unsigned draft pick
- (FA) Free agent
- (S) Suspended
- Injured

== Series summary ==
Game	Date	Home team	Result	Road team
Game 1	May 22	Philadelphia 76ers	107–101 (1–0)	Portland Trail Blazers
Game 2	May 26	Philadelphia 76ers	107–89 (2–0)	Portland Trail Blazers
Game 3	May 29	Portland Trail Blazers	129–107 (1–2)	Philadelphia 76ers
Game 4	May 31	Portland Trail Blazers	130–98 (2–2)	Philadelphia 76ers
Game 5	June 3	Philadelphia 76ers	104–110 (2–3)	Portland Trail Blazers
Game 6	June 5	Portland Trail Blazers	109–107 (4–2)	Philadelphia 76ers

Trail Blazers win series 4–2

== Game summaries ==
=== Game 1 ===
May 22

Recap/Box

Portland Trail Blazers 101, Philadelphia 76ers 107
Scoring by quarter: 25–27, 28–28, 25–31, 23–21
Pts: Walton 28; Rebs: Walton 20; Asts: Hollins, Davis 6 each	Pts: Erving 33; Rebs: C. Jones 11; Asts: Collins 6
Philadelphia leads series, 1–0

Philadelphia Spectrum, Philadelphia, Pennsylvania
Attendance: 18,276
Referees: Strom, Vanak

Game 1 started with a Dr. J windmill slam dunk off the opening tip, and never got much better for the Blazers, who committed 34 turnovers. Erving scored 33 points and Doug Collins had 30, as the 76ers won 107–101. Walton finished with 28 points and 20 rebounds.

=== Game 2 ===
May 26

Recap/Box

Portland Trail Blazers 89, Philadelphia 76ers 107
Scoring by quarter: 26–31, 17–30, 21–20, 25–26
Pts: Walton 17; Rebs: Walton 16; Asts: Gross 4	Pts: Collins 27; Rebs: C. Jones 14; Asts: Bibby 11
Philadelphia leads series, 2–0

Philadelphia Spectrum, Philadelphia, Pennsylvania
Attendance: 18,276
Referees: Joe Gushue, Richie Powers

Game 2 was an easy 107–89 win for the 76ers, who at one point scored 14 points in under 3 minutes. In the final 5 minutes, however, Philadelphia's Darryl Dawkins and Portland's Bob Gross both went up for a rebound and wrestled each other to the floor. Dawkins and Gross squared off and both benches cleared, including the coaches. In the middle of the fray, Maurice Lucas, in an act of team unity and in support of Gross, slapped Dawkins from behind and challenged him. Dawkins and Lucas were ejected, and Doug Collins needed four stitches after he caught a punch from Dawkins that had missed its target. Dawkins and Lucas were each fined US$2,500 (equivalent to $13,283 in 2025). This brawl is commonly looked upon as the turning point in this series, as the Blazers unified and showed the Sixers that they wouldn't be humiliated.

=== Game 3 ===
May 29

Recap/Box

Philadelphia 76ers 107, Portland Trail Blazers 129
Scoring by quarter: 21–34, 32–26, 29–27, 25–42
Pts: Erving 28; Rebs: McGinnis 12; Asts: Erving 5	Pts: Lucas 27; Rebs: Walton 18; Asts: Walton 9
Philadelphia leads series, 2–1

Portland Memorial Coliseum, Portland, Oregon
Attendance: 12,923
Referees: O'Donnell, Garretson

The series moved to Portland for the next two games, and game 3 got underway following a few tense moments as Lucas approached the Philadelphia bench before the game and offered his hand in friendship to Dawkins and the 76ers. The Blazers offense took charge of the game and posted a 42-point fourth quarter to win 129–107. The turning point came early in the fourth with the score 91–87, when Walton tipped in an alley-oop pass from Bob Gross over Darryl Dawkins, who knocked him to the floor. Dave Twardzik then stole the Sixers' ensuing inbounds pass and found Walton, who was back on his feet, for another alley-oop dunk. Lucas had 27 points and 12 rebounds, and Walton contributed 20 points, 18 rebounds, and 9 assists.

=== Game 4 ===
May 31

Recap

Philadelphia 76ers 98, Portland Trail Blazers 130
Scoring by quarter: 16–29, 30–28, 21–41, 31–32
Pts: Erving 24; Rebs: Dawkins 11; Asts: Mix 4	Pts: Hollins 25; Rebs: Walton 13; Asts: Walton 7
Series tied, 2–2

Portland Memorial Coliseum, Portland, Oregon
Attendance: 12,913
Referees: Sokol, Murphy

Philadelphia attempted to use George McGinnis and Caldwell Jones on the inside for Game 4, but Walton had other ideas, going on a shot-blocking frenzy. Portland quickly led the game by 17 points and never looked back, scoring 41 points in the third quarter, despite Walton committing his fifth foul midway through the third and being on the bench for most of the second half. They won by a score of 130–98, with the 32 point win being the largest margin of victory in a Finals game 4 until 2024.

=== Game 5 ===
June 3

Recap

Portland Trail Blazers 110, Philadelphia 76ers 104
Scoring by quarter: 22–15, 23–26, 40–25, 25–38
Pts: Gross 25; Rebs: Walton 24; Asts: Davis 8	Pts: Erving 37; Rebs: Jones 13; Asts: Erving 7
Portland leads series, 3–2

Philadelphia Spectrum, Philadelphia, Pennsylvania
Attendance: 18,276
Referees: Strom, Garretson

Game 5 returned to Philadelphia with the series tied 2–2. Philadelphia spent much of the first half fouling the Blazers, racking up 22 personal fouls and sending the half-time score into the 40s. The Blazers added another 40 points to their total in the third quarter, and with a little over 8 minutes left in the game, Portland led 91–69. Erving rallied his team late in the fourth, scoring 37 points himself, but the Sixers ultimately lost 110–104. Portland set numerous rebounding records for its team, 59 (48 defensive, team record) in all which stood until 1985, 24 (20 defensive, another team record) of which belonged to Walton alone; his team record still stands.

=== Game 6 ===
June 5

Recap

Philadelphia 76ers 107, Portland Trail Blazers 109
Scoring by quarter: 27–27, 28–40, 27–24, 25–18
Pts: Erving 40; Rebs: McGinnis 16; Asts: Erving 8	Pts: Gross 24; Rebs: Walton 23; Asts: Walton 7
Portland wins the series, 4–2

Portland Memorial Coliseum, Portland, Oregon
Attendance: 12,951
Referees: Powers, O'Donnell

Philadelphia ball.
Five seconds to go...Free will inbound.
Here we go.
The inbound to McGinnis.
Drives, stops, pumps, shoots, short, no good!
AND THE GAME IS OVER! THE GAME IS OVER!

— Bill Schonely, Blazers' play-by-play radio announcer
June 5, 1977

Portland, now leading the series 3–2, arrived back home for Game 6 in the middle of the night to a crowd of 5,000 fans waiting at the airport. With just 48 minutes separating the Blazers from their first championship, "Blazermania" had gripped the city. Philadelphia kept the game close throughout the first quarter, but were down by 15 at halftime after the Blazers netted 40 points in the second quarter. Erving tried in vain to force a Game 7 for his team, scoring 40 points, but Bill Walton's 20 points, 23 rebounds, 7 assists and 8 blocks kept the game in Portland's favor.

The last play of the game took place with Philadelphia inbounding the ball with five seconds left, down just two points. Philadelphia's George McGinnis missed the game-tying jump shot, but all other nine players swarmed to position themselves to get the rebound. Portland's Bill Walton reached over all of them and slapped the ball up the court with two seconds left, and the clock expired for a heart-stopping 109–107 Portland win. The crowd stormed onto the court in a celebratory frenzy.

Walton was named finals MVP and was called "an inspiration" by the defeated Julius Erving. Maurice Lucas later said of Walton's post-game thrown jersey that was sent into the rushing crowd of fans, "if I had caught the shirt, I would have eaten it. Bill's my hero."

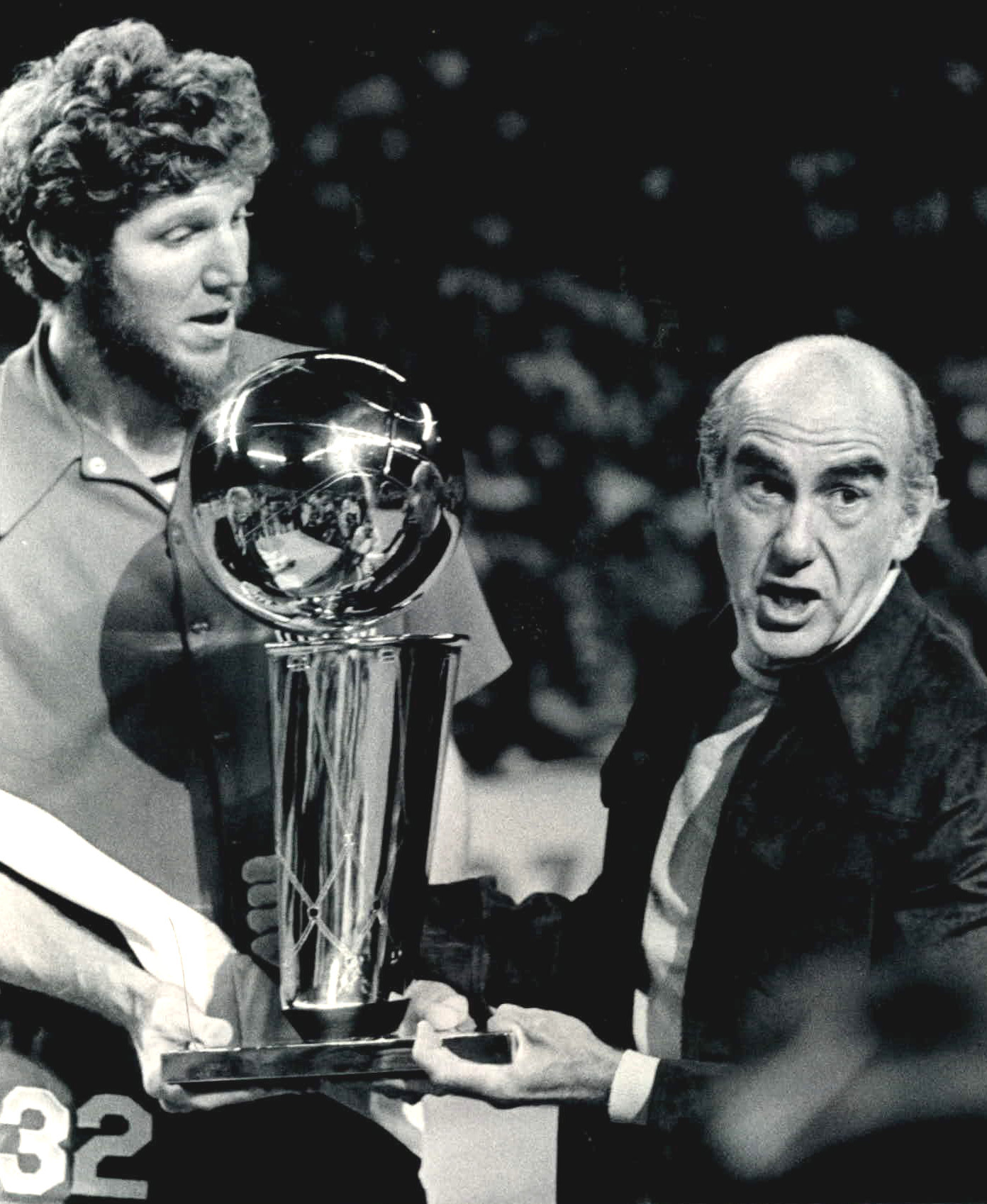
Finals MVP Bill Walton and Trail Blazers head coach Jack Ramsay holding the Larry O'Brien Trophy.

Portland was awarded two trophies for winning the NBA Championship: The Walter A. Brown Trophy, which was kept by the winning team for only a year until the next NBA Finals; and a newly designed trophy later to be known as the Larry O'Brien Trophy which was now to be kept by the winning team with a new one produced at every NBA Finals since. The Walter A. Brown Trophy was retired shortly after this game.

== Notes ==
Game 6 in Portland was originally scheduled to start at 10:30 a.m. PT (1:30 p.m. ET) on Sunday morning, because CBS wanted to accommodate a golf telecast of the Kemper Open—such scheduling had been used in the 1976 NBA Finals, for Game 3 played in Phoenix. However, the NBA refused and CBS agreed to a noon start.

Despite the fact that this was the Finals' clinching game, CBS cut away from their NBA coverage very quickly after the game ended, skipping the trophy presentation in the Portland locker room to instead televise the golf tournament. The only known footage of the trophy presentation was of Blazers head coach Jack Ramsay voicing his opinion about Bill Walton's performance in the NBA Finals.

I've never coached a better player. I've never coached a better competitor. And I've never coached a better person than Bill Walton.

== Aftermath ==
The 1977-78 Blazers started with 50 wins in their first 60 games, but due to Bill Walton's foot injury they only managed to go 8–14 the rest of the way. This would be Walton's last season with the club, as he sat out the 1978-79 season and then was signed by the San Diego Clippers.

As of 2026, this remains Portland’s only NBA championship. The Trail Blazers would return to the NBA Finals in 1990, but they would fall to the Detroit Pistons in five games. They also returned to the Finals in 1992, but lost to the Michael Jordan-led Chicago Bulls in six games, becoming the second victim of the first Bulls three-peat from 1991 to 1993.

The 76ers returned to the NBA Finals in 1980 and 1982, but lost both to the Magic Johnson-led Los Angeles Lakers in six games. They would win their next and most recent championship in 1983 over the aforementioned Lakers in a sweep.

1977 Portland reserve guard Johnny Davis later coached the 76ers for one ill-fated season in 1996–97.

== See also ==
- 1977 NBA playoffs
- 1976–77 NBA season
