= 1980–81 Denver Nuggets season =

NBA professional basketball team season

- Head coach: Donnie Walsh; Doug Moe
- Arena: McNichols Sports Arena

Results
- Record: 37–45 (.451)
- Place: Division: 4th (Midwest); Conference: 8th (Western)
- Playoff finish: Did not qualify
- Stats at Basketball Reference

The 1980–81 Denver Nuggets season was the Nuggets 5th season in the NBA and their 14th season as a franchise.

== Draft picks ==
The Denver Nuggets made twelve selections in the 1980 NBA Draft.

Round	Pick	Player	Position	Nationality	School/Club team
1	5	James Ray	PF	United States	Jacksonville
1	23	Carl Nicks	PG	United States	Indiana State
2	41	Jawann Oldham	C	United States	Seattle
3	47	Kurt Nimphius	C/PF	United States	Arizona State
3	48	Eddie Lee		United States	Cincinnati
3	51	Ronnie Valentine	PF	United States	Old Dominion
4	73	Sammie Ellis		United States	Pittsburgh
5	97	James Patrick		United States	Southwest Texas State
6	119	Ernie Hill		United States	Oklahoma City
7	143	Tommy Springer		United States	Vanderbilt
9	184	Jim Graziano		United States	South Carolina
10	202	Earl Sango		United States	Regis

== Roster ==
1980–81 Denver Nuggets roster
Players

Pos.	No.	Player	Height	Weight	DOB	From
SG	23	T.R. Dunn	6 ft 4 in (1.93 m)	192 lb (87 kg)		Alabama
SF	2	Alex English	6 ft 7 in (2.01 m)	190 lb (86 kg)		South Carolina
F	22	Glen Gondrezick	6 ft 6 in (1.98 m)	218 lb (99 kg)		UNLV
G	1	Kenny Higgs	6 ft 0 in (1.83 m)	180 lb (82 kg)		LSU
F	34	Cedrick Hordges	6 ft 8 in (2.03 m)	220 lb (100 kg)		South Carolina
C	44	Dan Issel	6 ft 9 in (2.06 m)	235 lb (107 kg)		Kentucky
G	7	Billy McKinney	6 ft 0 in (1.83 m)	170 lb (77 kg)		Northwestern
F	43	James Ray	6 ft 8 in (2.03 m)	215 lb (98 kg)		Jacksonville
C	25	Dave Robisch	6 ft 10 in (2.08 m)	235 lb (107 kg)		Kansas
G	10	John Roche	6 ft 3 in (1.91 m)	170 lb (77 kg)		South Carolina
SF	33	David Thompson	6 ft 4 in (1.93 m)	195 lb (88 kg)		NC State
F	42	Ronnie Valentine	6 ft 7 in (2.01 m)	210 lb (95 kg)		Old Dominion
PF	55	Kiki Vandeweghe	6 ft 8 in (2.03 m)	220 lb (100 kg)		UCLA

Coaches
Head coach
- (United States) Doug Moe

Legend
- (DP) Unsigned draft pick
- (FA) Free agent
- (S) Suspended
- Injured

== Regular season ==
=== Season standings ===
Midwest Division	W	L	PCT	GB	Home	Road	Div
y-San Antonio Spurs	52	30	.634	–	34–7	18–23	21–9
x-Kansas City Kings	40	42	.488	12.0	24–17	16–25	19–11
x-Houston Rockets	40	42	.488	12.0	25–16	15–26	19–11
Denver Nuggets	37	45	.451	15.0	23–18	14–27	13–17
Utah Jazz	28	54	.341	24.0	20–21	8–33	13–17
Dallas Mavericks	15	67	.183	37.0	11–30	4–37	5–25

#	Western Conference				
#	Team	W	L	PCT	GB
1	c-Phoenix Suns	57	25	.695	–
2	y-San Antonio Spurs	52	30	.634	5
3	x-Los Angeles Lakers	54	28	.659	3
4	x-Portland Trail Blazers	45	37	.549	12
5	x-Kansas City Kings	40	42	.488	17
6	x-Houston Rockets	40	42	.488	17
7	Golden State Warriors	39	43	.476	18
8	Denver Nuggets	37	45	.451	20
9	San Diego Clippers	36	46	.439	21
10	Seattle SuperSonics	34	48	.415	23
11	Utah Jazz	28	54	.341	29
12	Dallas Mavericks	15	67	.183	42

Notes

- z, y – division champions
- x – clinched playoff spot

== Game log ==
=== Regular season ===
1980–81 game log
Total: 37–45 (home: 23–18; road: 14–27)
October: 2–7 (home: 1–4; road: 1–3)

Game	Date	Team	Score	High points	High rebounds	High assists	Location Attendance	Record
1	October 10	San Antonio	L 112–113				McNichols Sports Arena	0–1
2	October 12	Utah	L 121–125 (OT)				McNichols Sports Arena	0–2
3	October 15	Dallas	W 133–98				McNichols Sports Arena	1–2
4	October 17	@ San Diego	W 129–116				San Diego Sports Arena	2–2
5	October 18	@ Utah	L 115–117				Salt Palace Acord Arena	2–3
6	October 21	Houston	L 117–119				McNichols Sports Arena	2–4
7	October 24	Phoenix	L 94–117				McNichols Sports Arena	2–5
8	October 25	@ Kansas City	L 122–125				Kemper Arena	2–6
9	October 29	@ Golden State	L 109–115				Oakland–Alameda County Coliseum Arena	2–7

November: 8–7 (home: 4–2; road: 4–5)

Game	Date	Team	Score	High points	High rebounds	High assists	Location Attendance	Record
10	November 1	Seattle	W 123–118				McNichols Sports Arena	3–7
11	November 2	@ Los Angeles	W 123–121				The Forum	4–7
12	November 5	@ Seattle	W 125–117				Kingdome	5–7
13	November 7	New York	L 115–124				McNichols Sports Arena	5–8
14	November 8	@ Chicago	W 130–126 (2OT)				Chicago Stadium	6–8
15	November 11	@ Washington	L 92–107				Capital Centre	6–9
16	November 12	@ New Jersey	L 111–118				Rutgers Athletic Center	6–10
17	November 15	Portland	W 125–123				McNichols Sports Arena	7–10
18	November 18	@ Portland	L 103–122				Memorial Coliseum	7–11
19	November 21	Kansas City	W 134–121				McNichols Sports Arena	8–11
20	November 23	@ Phoenix	L 113–131				Arizona Veterans Memorial Coliseum	8–12
21	November 25	@ San Diego	L 94–108				San Diego Sports Arena	8–13
22	November 26	San Diego	W 113–109				McNichols Sports Arena	9–13
23	November 28	@ Dallas	W 119–117 (OT)				Reunion Arena	10–13
24	November 29	Los Angeles	L 123–124 (2OT)				McNichols Sports Arena	10–14

December: 3–10 (home: 3–3; road: 0–7)

Game	Date	Team	Score	High points	High rebounds	High assists	Location Attendance	Record
25	December 2	Chicago	L 124–129				McNichols Sports Arena	10–15
26	December 4	@ Utah	L 118–122				Salt Palace Acord Arena	10–16
27	December 5	Golden State	L 114–119				McNichols Sports Arena	10–17
28	December 6	@ Houston	L 108–111				The Summit	10–18
29	December 10	Dallas	W 116–107				McNichols Sports Arena	11–18
30	December 13	@ San Antonio	L 123–147				HemisFair Arena	11–19
31	December 16	Kansas City	L 118–133				McNichols Sports Arena	11–20
32	December 18	@ Cleveland	L 122–130				Richfield Coliseum	11–21
33	December 20	@ New York	L 114–120				Madison Square Garden	11–22
34	December 23	@ Boston	L 128–136				Boston Garden	11–23
35	December 26	@ Dallas	L 111–119				Reunion Arena	11–24
36	December 27	Philadelphia	W 125–121				McNichols Sports Arena	12–24
37	December 30	Indiana	W 127–110				McNichols Sports Arena	13–24

January: 7–8 (home: 4–4; road: 3–4)

Game	Date	Team	Score	High points	High rebounds	High assists	Location Attendance	Record
38	January 1	@ Portland	L 119–122				Memorial Coliseum	13–25
39	January 2	Phoenix	L 132–133				McNichols Sports Arena	13–26
40	January 3	@ Houston	W 134–132				The Summit	14–26
41	January 7	Utah	L 117–121				McNichols Sports Arena	14–27
42	January 9	@ San Diego	W 130–116				San Diego Sports Arena	15–27
43	January 10	@ Seattle	L 116–119				Kingdome	15–28
44	January 13	Atlanta	W 135–132				McNichols Sports Arena	16–28
45	January 14	@ Phoenix	L 102–128				Arizona Veterans Memorial Coliseum	16–29
46	January 17	@ Kansas City	W 123–122				Kemper Arena	17–29
47	January 18	Houston	L 97–98				McNichols Sports Arena	17–30
48	January 21	San Diego	L 116–125				McNichols Sports Arena	17–31
49	January 23	@ Los Angeles	L 105–110				The Forum	17–32
50	January 24	San Antonio	W 129–115				McNichols Sports Arena	18–32
51	January 27	Detroit	W 143–123				McNichols Sports Arena	19–32
52	January 29	Milwaukee	W 131–118				McNichols Sports Arena	20–32

February: 7–6 (home: 6–3; road: 1–3)

Game	Date	Team	Score	High points	High rebounds	High assists	Location Attendance	Record
All-Star Break
53	February 3	@ Houston	L 128–135 (OT)				The Summit	20–33
54	February 4	San Antonio	L 132–135				McNichols Sports Arena	20–34
55	February 6	@ Utah	W 120–116				Salt Palace Acord Arena	21–34
56	February 7	Golden State	W 135–125				McNichols Sports Arena	22–34
57	February 8	@ Seattle	L 112–133				Kingdome	22–35
58	February 10	Washington	L 110–115				McNichols Sports Arena	22–36
59	February 13	Portland	W 162–143				McNichols Sports Arena	23–36
60	February 15	Boston	L 118–120				McNichols Sports Arena	23–37
61	February 19	Phoenix	W 127–126				McNichols Sports Arena	24–37
62	February 21	Kansas City	W 129–109				McNichols Sports Arena	25–37
63	February 22	@ San Antonio	L 129–133 (OT)				HemisFair Arena	25–38
64	February 24	New Jersey	W 140–123				McNichols Sports Arena	26–38
65	February 27	Golden State	W 137–130				McNichols Sports Arena	27–38

March: 10–7 (home: 5–2; road: 5–5)

Game	Date	Team	Score	High points	High rebounds	High assists	Location Attendance	Record
66	March 1	Cleveland	W 137–127				McNichols Sports Arena	28–38
67	March 4	Los Angeles	W 123–114				McNichols Sports Arena	29–38
68	March 6	@ Philadelphia	L 112–131				The Spectrum	29–39
69	March 7	@ Detroit	W 121–109				Pontiac Silverdome	30–39
70	March 8	@ Indiana	L 119–129				Market Square Arena	30–40
71	March 10	Portland	L 137–142				McNichols Sports Arena	30–41
72	March 12	@ Milwaukee	L 113–131				MECCA Arena	30–42
73	March 13	@ Atlanta	L 117–119				The Omni	30–43
74	March 15	Houston	W 138–127				McNichols Sports Arena	31–43
75	March 17	Seattle	W 124–112				McNichols Sports Arena	32–43
76	March 18	@ Kansas City	W 126–124 (2OT)				Kemper Arena	33–43
77	March 20	@ Dallas	L 125–126				Reunion Arena	33–44
78	March 22	Utah	W 113–108				McNichols Sports Arena	34–44
79	March 24	@ San Antonio	W 125–123				HemisFair Arena	35–44
80	March 25	Dallas	L 115–126				McNichols Sports Arena	35–45
81	March 28	@ Golden State	W 142–139				Oakland–Alameda County Coliseum Arena	36–45
82	March 29	@ Los Angeles	W 148–146 (OT)				The Forum	37–45

1980–81 schedule
