= 1980–81 San Antonio Spurs season =

- Division champions
- Head coach: Stan Albeck
- General manager: Bob Bass
- Owner: Angelo Drossos
- Arena: HemisFair Arena

Results
- Record: 52–30 (.634)
- Place: Division: 1st (Midwest); Conference: 2nd (Western)
- Playoff finish: Conference semifinals (lost to Rockets 3–4)
- Stats at Basketball Reference

Local media
- Television: KMOL
- Radio: KCTI

The 1980–81 San Antonio Spurs season was the fifth season in the NBA, the seventh in San Antonio and the 13th as a franchise. It was a landmark season in many ways. The San Antonio Spurs moved to the Western Conference along with the Houston Rockets. The Spurs won their first Midwest Division title, and their third division title overall (they had won the Central Division in 1977-78 and 1978–79). The Spurs had the fourth best team offensive rating in the NBA.

== Draft picks ==
Round	Pick	Player	Position	Nationality	School/Club team
1	15	Reggie Johnson	PF/C	United States	Tennessee
2	39	Michael Wiley		United States	California State-Long Beach
4	83	Calvin Roberts		United States	California State-Fullerton
5	107	Gib Hinz		United States	Wisconsin-Eau Claire
6	129	Dean Uthoff		United States	Iowa State
7	153	Allan Zahn		United States	Arkansas
8	172	Bill Bailey		United States	Texas Pan-American
9	192	Al Williams		United States	North Texas State
10	209	Steve Schall		United States	Arkansas

== Roster ==
1980–81 San Antonio Spurs roster
Players

Pos.	No.	Player	Height	Weight	DOB	From
G	10	Ron Brewer	6 ft 4 in (1.93 m)	180 lb (82 kg)	1955–07–16	Arkansas
C	40	Dave Corzine	6 ft 11 in (2.11 m)	250 lb (113 kg)	1956–04–25	DePaul
G/F	44	George Gervin	6 ft 7 in (2.01 m)	180 lb (82 kg)	1952–04–27	Eastern Michigan
F/C	30	Paul Griffin	6 ft 9 in (2.06 m)	205 lb (93 kg)	1954–01–20	Western Michigan
F/C	52	George Johnson	6 ft 11 in (2.11 m)	205 lb (93 kg)	1948–12–18	Dillard
F	32	Reggie Johnson	6 ft 9 in (2.06 m)	205 lb (93 kg)	1957–06–25	Tennessee
G	00	Johnny Moore	6 ft 1 in (1.85 m)	175 lb (79 kg)	1958–03–03	Texas
F	53	Mark Olberding	6 ft 8 in (2.03 m)	225 lb (102 kg)	1956–04–21	Minnesota
F/C	31	Kevin Restani	6 ft 9 in (2.06 m)	225 lb (102 kg)	1951–12–23	San Francisco
G	13	James Silas	6 ft 1 in (1.85 m)	180 lb (82 kg)	1949–02–11	Stephen F. Austin
F	33	Michael Wiley	6 ft 9 in (2.06 m)	200 lb (91 kg)	1957–10–16	Long Beach State

Coaches
Head coach
- Stan Albeck
Assistant(s)
- Morris McHone

Legend
- (DP) Unsigned draft pick
- (FA) Free agent
- (S) Suspended
- Injured

Roster
Updated: March 2, 1981

== Regular season ==
Under realignment, the Spurs were shifted to the Midwest Division in the Western Conference. Looking to improve on the previous season, the Spurs looked to shore up the defense by acquiring Dave Corzine, Dave Johnson, and Reggie Johnson. The moves paid immediate dividends as the Spurs got off to a 10–2 start, on the way to a Division Crown with a 52–30 record. In the playoffs, the Spurs lost in 7 games to the cross-state rival Houston Rockets.

- The 1980-81 San Antonio Spurs scored 9209 points and allowed 8973 points
- The Spurs Points Per 100 Possessions on Offense was 109.7, which ranked 1st out of 23 teams. Their Points Per 100 Possessions on the Defense was 104.5, ranking them 8th out of 23.

=== Season standings ===
Midwest Division	W	L	PCT	GB	Home	Road	Div
y-San Antonio Spurs	52	30	.634	–	34–7	18–23	21–9
x-Kansas City Kings	40	42	.488	12.0	24–17	16–25	19–11
x-Houston Rockets	40	42	.488	12.0	25–16	15–26	19–11
Denver Nuggets	37	45	.451	15.0	23–18	14–27	13–17
Utah Jazz	28	54	.341	24.0	20–21	8–33	13–17
Dallas Mavericks	15	67	.183	37.0	11–30	4–37	5–25

#	Western Conference				
#	Team	W	L	PCT	GB
1	c-Phoenix Suns	57	25	.695	–
2	y-San Antonio Spurs	52	30	.634	5
3	x-Los Angeles Lakers	54	28	.659	3
4	x-Portland Trail Blazers	45	37	.549	12
5	x-Kansas City Kings	40	42	.488	17
6	x-Houston Rockets	40	42	.488	17
7	Golden State Warriors	39	43	.476	18
8	Denver Nuggets	37	45	.451	20
9	San Diego Clippers	36	46	.439	21
10	Seattle SuperSonics	34	48	.415	23
11	Utah Jazz	28	54	.341	29
12	Dallas Mavericks	15	67	.183	42

Notes

- z, y – division champions
- x – clinched playoff spot

== Game log ==
=== Regular season ===
1980–81 game log
Total: 52–30 (home: 34–7; road: 18–23)
October: 10–2 (home: 5–0; road: 5–2)

Game	Date	Team	Score	High points	High rebounds	High assists	Location Attendance	Record
1	October 10	@ Denver	W 113–112				McNichols Sports Arena	1–0
2	October 11	@ Dallas	L 92–103				Reunion Arena	1–1
3	October 14	Kansas City	W 109–103				HemisFair Arena	2–1
4	October 16	@ Detroit	W 102–99				Pontiac Silverdome	3–1
5	October 18	Dallas	W 110–96				HemisFair Arena	4–1
6	October 21	San Diego	W 123–120				HemisFair Arena	5–1
7	October 23	Golden State	W 128–109				HemisFair Arena	6–1
8	October 25	@ San Diego	W 116–98				San Diego Sports Arena	7–1
9	October 26	@ Los Angeles	W 108–102				The Forum	8–1
10	October 28	Portland	W 120–112				HemisFair Arena	9–1
11	October 29	@ Utah	L 96–109				Salt Palace Acord Arena	9–2
12	October 31	@ Seattle	W 112–96				Kingdome	10–2

November: 7–6 (home: 4–3; road: 3–3)

Game	Date	Team	Score	High points	High rebounds	High assists	Location Attendance	Record
13	November 1	@ Golden State	L 108–123				Oakland–Alameda County Coliseum Arena	10–3
14	November 5	Phoenix	W 114–84				HemisFair Arena	11–3
15	November 8	Los Angeles	W 112–109				HemisFair Arena	12–3
16	November 11	Indiana	L 113–119				HemisFair Arena	12–4
17	November 12	@ Phoenix	L 127–130				Arizona Veterans Memorial Coliseum	12–5
18	November 13	@ San Diego	W 113–107				San Diego Sports Arena	13–5
19	November 15	Utah	W 120–104				HemisFair Arena	14–5
20	November 18	@ Atlanta	L 93–97				The Omni	14–6
21	November 19	@ New Jersey	W 112–104 (OT)				Rutgers Athletic Center	15–6
22	November 22	Philadelphia	L 101–108				HemisFair Arena	15–7
23	November 26	Chicago	W 125–122				HemisFair Arena	16–7
24	November 28	Houston	L 115–124				HemisFair Arena	16–8
25	November 29	@ Kansas City	W 106–104				Kemper Arena	17–8

December: 9–6 (home: 6–1; road: 3–5)

Game	Date	Team	Score	High points	High rebounds	High assists	Location Attendance	Record
26	December 2	Phoenix	L 107–122				HemisFair Arena	17–9
27	December 4	Cleveland	W 130–100				HemisFair Arena	18–9
28	December 7	@ Portland	L 115–116				Memorial Coliseum	18–10
29	December 8	@ Seattle	L 99–104				Kingdome	18–11
30	December 9	@ Utah	W 115–90				Salt Palace Acord Arena	19–11
31	December 11	Kansas City	W 122–104				HemisFair Arena	20–11
32	December 13	Denver	W 147–123				HemisFair Arena	21–11
33	December 14	@ Milwaukee	L 98–115				MECCA Arena	21–12
34	December 16	@ Dallas	W 89–83				Reunion Arena	22–12
35	December 17	@ Houston	W 113–107				The Summit	23–12
36	December 19	Golden State	W 126–111				HemisFair Arena	24–12
37	December 21	@ Los Angeles	L 122–135				The Forum	24–13
38	December 25	@ Phoenix	L 111–131				Arizona Veterans Memorial Coliseum	24–14
39	December 27	Utah	W 142–117				HemisFair Arena	25–14
40	December 30	Seattle	W 102–100				HemisFair Arena	26–14

January: 8–6 (home: 6–0; road: 2–6)

Game	Date	Team	Score	High points	High rebounds	High assists	Location Attendance	Record
41	January 2	Los Angeles	W 118–112				HemisFair Arena	27–14
42	January 3	@ Chicago	W 119–111				Chicago Stadium	28–14
43	January 6	@ New York	W 113–108				Madison Square Garden	29–14
44	January 7	@ Philadelphia	L 102–135				The Spectrum	29–15
45	January 9	Portland	W 102–86				HemisFair Arena	30–15
46	January 11	Washington	W 137–106				HemisFair Arena	31–15
47	January 14	New York	W 116–105				HemisFair Arena	32–15
48	January 16	@ Boston	L 85–94				Boston Garden	32–16
49	January 17	@ Washington	L 93–103				Capital Centre	32–17
50	January 20	Phoenix	W 119–112 (OT)				HemisFair Arena	33–17
51	January 21	@ Kansas City	L 108–115				Kemper Arena	33–18
52	January 24	@ Denver	L 115–129				McNichols Sports Arena	33–19
53	January 25	@ Portland	L 100–118				Memorial Coliseum	33–20
54	January 29	New Jersey	W 122–108				HemisFair Arena	34–20

February: 10–4 (home: 8–1; road: 2–3)

Game	Date	Team	Score	High points	High rebounds	High assists	Location Attendance	Record
55	February 3	Detroit	W 102–99				HemisFair Arena	35–20
56	February 4	@ Denver	W 135–132				McNichols Sports Arena	36–20
57	February 6	Portland	W 122–96				HemisFair Arena	37–20
58	February 8	Dallas	W 102–98				HemisFair Arena	38–20
59	February 11	@ Houston	L 89–108				The Summit	38–21
60	February 12	Atlanta	W 110–109				HemisFair Arena	39–21
61	February 14	@ Dallas	W 107–99				Reunion Arena	40–21
62	February 15	Milwaukee	W 110–108				HemisFair Arena	41–21
63	February 17	Boston	L 116–128				HemisFair Arena	41–22
64	February 19	@ Cleveland	L 104–118				Richfield Coliseum	41–23
65	February 20	@ Indiana	L 106–109				Market Square Arena	41–24
66	February 22	Denver	W 133–129 (OT)				HemisFair Arena	42–24
67	February 24	Golden State	W 131–126				HemisFair Arena	43–24
68	February 26	Seattle	W 123–113				HemisFair Arena	44–24

March: 8–6 (home: 5–2; road: 3–4)

Game	Date	Team	Score	High points	High rebounds	High assists	Location Attendance	Record
69	March 1	Houston	W 102–86				HemisFair Arena	45–24
70	March 4	Kansas City	L 97–111				HemisFair Arena	45–25
71	March 6	@ Seattle	L 94–102				Kingdome	45–26
72	March 8	Dallas	W 133–108				HemisFair Arena	46–26
73	March 10	@ Los Angeles	L 104–118				The Forum	46–27
74	March 14	@ San Diego	L 118–126				San Diego Sports Arena	46–28
75	March 15	@ Golden State	W 114–112 (OT)				Oakland–Alameda County Coliseum Arena	47–28
76	March 17	Utah	W 94–86				HemisFair Arena	48–28
77	March 20	@ Kansas City	W 114–111 (OT)				Kemper Arena	49–28
78	March 22	San Diego	W 107–99				HemisFair Arena	50–28
79	March 24	Denver	L 123–125				HemisFair Arena	50–29
80	March 25	@ Houston	L 111–117				The Summit	50–30
81	March 26	@ Utah	W 98–97				Salt Palace Acord Arena	51–30
82	March 29	Houston	W 135–109				HemisFair Arena	52–30

1980–81 schedule

=== Playoffs ===
1981 playoff game log
Conference semifinals: 3–4 (home: 1–3; road: 2–1)

Game	Date	Team	Score	High points	High rebounds	High assists	Location Attendance	Series
1	April 7	Houston	L 98–107	George Gervin (30)	George Johnson (12)	Paul Griffin (7)	HemisFair Arena; 13,319	0–1
2	April 8	Houston	W 125–113	Mark Olberding (34)	G. Johnson, Griffin (7)	Dave Corzine (7)	HemisFair Arena; 12,128	1–1
3	April 10	@ Houston	L 99–112	George Gervin (33)	Gervin, G. Johnson (8)	Mark Olberding (5)	The Summit; 16,121	1–2
4	April 12	@ Houston	W 114–112	George Gervin (33)	Dave Corzine (11)	Mark Olberding (6)	The Summit; 16,121	2–2
5	April 14	Houston	L 117–123	Reggie Johnson (25)	George Johnson (11)	George Gervin (9)	HemisFair Arena; 16,114	2–3
6	April 15	@ Houston	W 101–96	George Gervin (26)	three players tied (8)	Mark Olberding (6)	The Summit; 16,121	3–3
7	April 17	Houston	L 100–105	George Gervin (21)	George Johnson (10)	Johnny Moore (10)	HemisFair Arena; 16,114	3–4

1981 schedule

== Player statistics ==
=== Ragular season ===
Player	POS	GP	GS	MP	REB	AST	STL	BLK	PTS	MPG	RPG	APG	SPG	BPG	PPG
George Gervin	SG	82	82	2,765	419	260	94	56	2,221	33.7	5.1	3.2	1.1	.7	27.1
Mark Olberding	SF	82	82	2,408	471	277	75	31	1,012	29.4	5.7	3.4	.9	.4	12.3
George T. Johnson	C	82	82	1,935	602	92	47	278	408	23.6	7.3	1.1	.6	3.4	5.0
Dave Corzine	C	82		1,960	636	117	42	99	857	23.9	7.8	1.4	.5	1.2	10.5
Paul Griffin	PF	82		1,930	505	249	77	38	502	23.5	6.2	3.0	.9	.5	6.1
Johnny Moore	PG	82		1,578	196	373	120	22	604	19.2	2.4	4.5	1.5	.3	7.4
Reggie Johnson	PF	79		1,716	358	78	45	48	808	21.7	4.5	1.0	.6	.6	10.2
James Silas	PG	75		2,055	231	285	51	12	1,326	27.4	3.1	3.8	.7	.2	17.7
Kevin Restani	SF	64		999	174	81	16	14	449	15.6	2.7	1.3	.3	.2	7.0
Ron Brewer^{†}	SG	46		904	53	93	27	25	425	19.7	1.2	2.0	.6	.5	9.2
Mike Gale^{†}	PG	35		636	52	99	55	2	192	18.2	1.5	2.8	1.6	.1	5.5
Michael Wiley	PF	33		271	64	11	8	6	188	8.2	1.9	.3	.2	.2	5.7
John Shumate^{†}	PF	22		519	87	24	21	9	165	23.6	4.0	1.1	1.0	.4	7.5
Gus Gerard^{†}	SF	11		129	38	9	7	3	52	11.7	3.5	.8	.6	.3	4.7

- ^{†} Denotes player spent time with another team in the season. Stats reflect time with the Spurs only.

=== Playoffs ===
Player	POS	GP	GS	MP	REB	AST	STL	BLK	PTS	MPG	RPG	APG	SPG	BPG	PPG
George Gervin	SG	7		274	35	24	5	5	190	39.1	5.0	3.4	.7	.7	27.1
Mark Olberding	SF	7		254	41	30	4	0	138	36.3	5.9	4.3	.6	.0	19.7
Reggie Johnson	PF	7		224	34	16	4	5	89	32.0	4.9	2.3	.6	.7	12.7
Paul Griffin	PF	7		183	40	29	6	5	37	26.1	5.7	4.1	.9	.7	5.3
George T. Johnson	C	7		165	63	6	3	16	31	23.6	9.0	.9	.4	2.3	4.4
James Silas	PG	7		161	15	19	4	0	80	23.0	2.1	2.7	.6	.0	11.4
Dave Corzine	C	7		161	48	16	4	8	63	23.0	6.9	2.3	.6	1.1	9.0
Johnny Moore	PG	7		124	13	27	10	1	42	17.7	1.9	3.9	1.4	.1	6.0
Ron Brewer	SG	7		118	5	13	1	6	80	16.9	.7	1.9	.1	.9	11.4
Kevin Restani	SF	3		11	2	0	0	1	2	3.7	.7	.0	.0	.3	.7
Michael Wiley	PF	3		5	0	0	0	0	2	1.7	.0	.0	.0	.0	.7

== Award winners ==
- George Gervin, All-NBA First Team
- George Johnson, NBA Leader Blocks per Game, 3.4
