= 1980–81 Seattle SuperSonics season =

NBA professional basketball team season

- Head coach: Lenny Wilkens
- General manager: Zollie Volchok
- Owner: Sam Schulman
- Arena: Kingdome

Results
- Record: 34–48 (.415)
- Place: Division: 6th (Pacific); Conference: 10th (Western)
- Playoff finish: Did not qualify
- Stats at Basketball Reference

Local media
- Television: KIRO-TV
- Radio: KIRO

The 1980–81 Seattle SuperSonics season was the SuperSonics 14th season in the NBA.

== Offseason ==
=== Draft ===
Round	Pick	Player	Position	Nationality	College
1	20	Bill Hanzlik	SF/PF	United States	Notre Dame
3	66	Carl Bailey	C	United States	Tuskegee
4	89	Gary Hooker	F	United States	Murray State
5	112	Lenny Horton	F	United States	Georgia Tech
6	135	Jim Strickland	C	United States	South Carolina
7	158	Carl Ervin	G	United States	Seattle
8	176	Al Dutch	F	United States	Georgetown
9	197	Jim Tillman	G	United States	Eastern Kentucky
10	212	Kent Williams	G	United States	Texas Tech

== Roster ==
1980–81 Seattle SuperSonics roster
Players

Pos.	No.	Player	Height	Weight	DOB	From
C	21	Dennis Awtrey	6 ft 10 in (2.08 m)	235 lb (107 kg)	1948–02–22	Santa Clara
PF	20	James Bailey	6 ft 9 in (2.06 m)	220 lb (100 kg)	1957–05–21	Rutgers
SG	32	Fred Brown	6 ft 3 in (1.91 m)	182 lb (83 kg)	1948–08–07	Iowa
C	40	James Donaldson	7 ft 2 in (2.18 m)	275 lb (125 kg)	1957–08–16	Washington State
SF	22	Bill Hanzlik	6 ft 7 in (2.01 m)	185 lb (84 kg)	1957–12–06	Notre Dame
PG	24	Armond Hill	6 ft 4 in (1.93 m)	190 lb (86 kg)	1953–03–31	Princeton
SF	27	John Johnson	6 ft 7 in (2.01 m)	200 lb (91 kg)	1947–10–18	Iowa
PG	15	Vinnie Johnson	6 ft 2 in (1.88 m)	200 lb (91 kg)	1956–09–01	Baylor
PF	8	Lonnie Shelton	6 ft 8 in (2.03 m)	240 lb (109 kg)	1955–10–19	Oregon State
C	43	Jack Sikma	6 ft 11 in (2.11 m)	230 lb (104 kg)	1955–11–14	Illinois Wesleyan
SF	42	Wally Walker	6 ft 7 in (2.01 m)	190 lb (86 kg)	1954–07–18	Virginia
SG	44	Paul Westphal	6 ft 4 in (1.93 m)	195 lb (88 kg)	1950–11–30	USC

Coaches
Head coach
- Lenny Wilkens
Assistant(s)
- Les Habegger
- Bob Kloppenburg

Legend
- (DP) Unsigned draft pick
- (FA) Free agent
- (S) Suspended
- Injured

Roster
Updated: January 19, 1981

== Standings ==
Pacific Division	W	L	PCT	GB	Home	Road	Div
y-Phoenix Suns	57	25	.695	–	36–5	21–20	22–8
x-Los Angeles Lakers	54	28	.659	3.0	30–11	24–17	19–11
x-Portland Trail Blazers	45	37	.549	12.0	30–11	15–26	18–12
Golden State Warriors	39	43	.476	18.0	26–15	13–28	10–20
San Diego Clippers	36	46	.439	21.0	22–19	14–27	14–16
Seattle SuperSonics	34	48	.415	23.0	22–19	12–29	7–23

#	Western Conference				
#	Team	W	L	PCT	GB
1	c-Phoenix Suns	57	25	.695	–
2	y-San Antonio Spurs	52	30	.634	5
3	x-Los Angeles Lakers	54	28	.659	3
4	x-Portland Trail Blazers	45	37	.549	12
5	x-Kansas City Kings	40	42	.488	17
6	x-Houston Rockets	40	42	.488	17
7	Golden State Warriors	39	43	.476	18
8	Denver Nuggets	37	45	.451	20
9	San Diego Clippers	36	46	.439	21
10	Seattle SuperSonics	34	48	.415	23
11	Utah Jazz	28	54	.341	29
12	Dallas Mavericks	15	67	.183	42

Notes

- z, y – division champions
- x – clinched playoff spot

== Game log ==
1980–81 game log
October (5–7)

Game	Date	Team	Score	Location Attendance	Record
1	October 10	Los Angeles	L 98–99	Kingdome	0–1
2	October 12	@ Portland	L 96–107	Memorial Coliseum	0–2
3	October 14	@ Dallas	W 85–83	Reunion Arena	1–2
4	October 15	@ Houston	L 100–103	The Summit	1–3
5	October 18	@ Kansas City	W 127–122	Kemper Arena	2–3
6	October 20	@ Utah	W 98–92	Salt Palace	3–3
7	October 22	Dallas	L 102–107	Kingdome	3–4
8	October 24	@ Los Angeles	L 98–104	The Forum	3–5
9	October 25	Phoenix	L 75–100	Kingdome	3–6
10	October 26	Portland	111–98	Kingdome	4–6
11	October 28	Golden State	119–102	Kingdome	5–6
12	October 31	San Antonio	L 96–112	Kingdome	5–7

November (6–7)

Game	Date	Team	Score	Location Attendance	Record
13	November 1	@ Denver	L 118–123	McNichols Sports Arena	5–8
14	November 3	Cleveland	W 118–83	Kingdome	6–8
15	November 5	Denver	L 117–125	Kingdome	6–9
16	November 7	San Diego	W 113–94	Kingdome	7–9
17	November 12	Utah	L 106–114	Kingdome	7–10
18	November 14	season	W 127–125	Kingdome	8–10
19	November 15	Houston	W 143–139 (OT)	Kingdome	9–10
20	November 18	@ Houston	L 118–138	The Summit	9–11
21	November 21	@ Dallas	W 101–91	Reunion Arena	10–11
22	November 23	@ San Diego	L 99–110	San Diego Sports Arena	10–12
23	November 26	@ Phoenix	L 103–113	Arizona Veterans Memorial Coliseum	10–13
24	November 28	San Diego	L 92–93	Kingdome	10–14
25	November 30	New Jersey	W 113–89	Kingdome	11–14

December (6–7)

Game	Date	Team	Score	Location Attendance	Record
26	December 3	Chicago	W 113–105	Kingdome	12–14
27	December 6	@ Utah	W 108–98	Salt Palace	13–14
28	December 8	San Antonio	w 104–99	Kingdome	14–14
29	December 9	@ Portland	L 98–111	Memorial Coliseum	14–15
30	December 10	@ Golden State	W 108–103	Oakland-Alameda County Coliseum Arena	15–15
31	December 12	Los Angeles	L 107–113	Kingdome	15–16
32	December 14	@ San Diego	L 81–91	San Diego Sports Arena	15–17
33	December 17	Kansas City	W 101–94	Kingdome	16–17
34	December 19	Atlanta	W 95–92	Kingdome	17–17
35	December 22	Phoenix	L 98–109	Kingdome	17–18
36	December 26	Portland	L 90–96	Kingdome	17–19
37	December 27	@ Golden State	L 98–104	Oakland-Alameda County Coliseum Arena	17–20
38	December 30	@ San Antonio	L 100–102	HemisFair Arena	17–21

January (4–10)

Game	Date	Team	Score	Location Attendance	Record
39	January 2	Philadelphia	L 117–120 (OT)	Kingdome	17–22
40	January 5	Dallas	W 103–89	Kingdome	18–22
41	January 7	Detroit	W 99–94	Kingdome	19–22
42	January 9	@ Los Angeles	L 87–92	The Forum	19–23
43	January 10	Denver	W 119–116	Kingdome	20–23
44	January 11	Golden State	L 98–106	Kingdome	20–24
45	January 13	@ Phoenix	L 99–104	Arizona Veterans Memorial Coliseum	20–25
46	January 16	@ Indiana	W 95–94	Market Square Arena	21–25
47	January 18	@ Philadelphia	L 92–113	The Spectrum	21–26
48	January 20	@ New York	L 97–98	Madison Square Garden	21–27
49	January 21	@ New Jersey	L 122–126 (OT)	Rutgers Athletic Center	21–28
50	January 23	@ Washington	L 91–103	Capital Centre	21–29
51	January 25	@ Boston	L 106–115	Boston Garden	21–30
52	January 28	Milwaukee	L 110–119	Kingdome	21–31

February (8–7)

Game	Date	Team	Score	Location Attendance	Record
53	February 4	Washington	W 108–99	Kingdome	22–31
54	February 6	Kansas City	L 92–102	Kingdome	22–32
55	February 7	Utah	W 96–89	Kingdome	23–32
56	February 8	Denver	W 133–112	Kingdome	24–32
57	February 10	Boston	W 108–107 (OT)	Kingdome	25–32
58	February 12	@ Portland	W 112–109	Memorial Coliseum	26–32
59	February 14	@ Chicago	W 117–134	Chicago Stadium	26–33
60	February 15	@ Kansas City	L 105–107	Kemper Arena	26–34
61	February 17	@ Utah	W 101–98	Salt Palace	27–34
62	February 18	New York	L 103–105	Kingdome	27–35
63	February 20	Phoenix	W 112–111	Kingdome	28–35
64	February 22	Houston	L 96–111	Kingdome	28–36
65	February 24	@ Dallas	W 102–84	Reunion Arena	29–36
66	February 26	@ San Antonio	L 113–123	HemisFair Arena	29–37
67	February 27	@ Houston	L 92–96	The Summit	29–38

March (5–10)

Game	Date	Team	Score	Location Attendance	Record
68	March 1	@ Atlanta	L 102–108	Omni Coliseum	29–39
69	March 4	Indiana	W 105–93	Kingdome	30–39
70	March 6	San Antonio	W 102–94	Kingdome	31–39
71	March 7	@ Golden State	L 103–106	Oakland-Alameda County Coliseum Arena	31–40
72	March 8	San Diego	L 92–103	Kingdome	31–41
73	March 11	@ Cleveland	W 101–95	Coliseum at Richfield	32–41
74	March 13	@ Detroit	W 102–100	Pontiac Silverdome	33–41
75	March 15	@ Milwaukee	L 108–132	MECCA Arena	33–42
76	March 17	@ Denver	L 112–124	McNichols Sports Arena	33–43
77	March 20	@ Los Angeles	L 119–133	The Forum	33–44
78	March 22	@ Phoenix	L 91–107	Arizona Veterans Memorial Coliseum	33–45
79	March 24	@ San Diego	L 106–111	San Diego Sports Arena	33–46
80	March 25	Portland	L 103–112	Kingdome	33–47
81	March 27	Los Angeles	L 90–97	Kingdome	33–48
82	March 29	Golden State	W 96–92	Kingdome	34–48

1980–81 schedule

== Player statistics ==
Legend
GP	Games played	GS	Games started	MPG	Minutes per game
FG%	Field-goal percentage	3P%	3-point field-goal percentage	FT%	Free-throw percentage
RPG	Rebounds per game	APG	Assists per game	SPG	Steals per game
BPG	Blocks per game	PPG	Points per game

Player	GP	GS	MPG	FG%	3FG%	FT%	RPG	APG	SPG	BPG	PPG
James Bailey	82		31.0	.499	.500	.709	7.4	1.2	.9	1.7	14.0
Fred Brown	78		25.5	.488	.359	.832	2.2	3.0	1.1	.2	15.5
James Donaldson	68		14.4	.542		.594	4.5	.6	.1	1.1	5.3
Bill Hanzlik	74		17.0	.478	.200	.793	2.1	1.5	.8	.3	5.4
John Johnson	80		29.1	.431	.000	.808	4.5	3.9	.7	.3	11.5
Vinnie Johnson	81		28.5	.534	.200	.793	4.5	4.2	1.0	.2	13.0
Lonnie Shelton	14		31.4	.420		.655	5.6	2.5	1.6	.2	13.0
Jack Sikma	82		35.6	.454	.000	.823	10.4	3.0	1.0	1.1	18.7
Wally Walker	82		21.9	.463	.000	.645	3.8	1.5	.6	.2	8.4
Paul Westphal	36		29.9	.442	.240	.832	1.9	4.1	1.3	.4	16.7

== Transactions ==
=== Free agents ===
Subtractions
Player	Date signed	New team
Tom LaGarde	Expansion Draft May 28, 1980	Dallas Mavericks
