= 1980–81 Los Angeles Lakers season =

NBA professional basketball team season

- Head coach: Paul Westhead
- General manager: Bill Sharman
- Owner: Jerry Buss
- Arena: The Forum

Results
- Record: 54–28 (.659)
- Place: Division: 2nd (Pacific); Conference: 3rd (Western)
- Playoff finish: First round (lost to Rockets 1–2)
- Stats at Basketball Reference

Local media
- Television: KHJ
- Radio: AM 570 KLAC

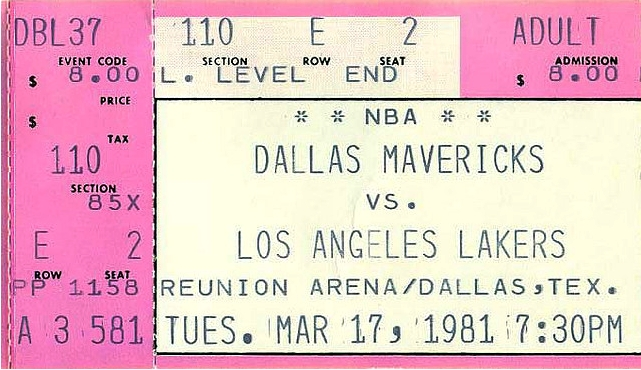
A ticket for a March 1981 game between the Los Angeles Lakers and the Dallas Mavericks.

The 1980–81 Los Angeles Lakers season was the Lakers' 33rd season in the NBA and the 21st season in Los Angeles. The Lakers were attempting to become the first team since 1969 to repeat as NBA Champions. Despite missing Magic Johnson for 45 games due to a knee injury, the Lakers still managed an impressive 54–28 record during the regular season, and they were the #3 seed heading into the Western Conference playoffs. However, the underdog Houston Rockets eliminated the Lakers in a best-of-three first round series two games to one.

== NBA draft ==
The Lakers did not have a first-round pick in the 1980 Draft. Their first selection was Wayne Robinson, the 31st pick overall, but he never played a game for the Lakers. Future NBA Coach Butch Carter was their second selection at #37 overall.

Round	Pick	Player	Position	Nationality	School/Club team
2	31	Wayne Robinson	Forward	United States	Virginia Tech
2	37	Butch Carter	Guard	United States	Indiana

== Roster ==
1980–81 Los Angeles Lakers roster
Players

Pos.	No.	Player	Height	Weight	DOB	From
C	33	Kareem Abdul-Jabbar	7 ft 2 in (2.18 m)	225 lb (102 kg)	1947-04-16	UCLA
PF	40	Jim Brewer	6 ft 9 in (2.06 m)	210 lb (95 kg)	1951-12-03	Minnesota
SF	24	Butch Carter	6 ft 5 in (1.96 m)	180 lb (82 kg)	1958-06-11	Indiana
PF	9	Jim Chones	6 ft 11 in (2.11 m)	220 lb (100 kg)	1949-11-30	Marquette
SG	21	Michael Cooper	6 ft 5 in (1.96 m)	170 lb (77 kg)	1956-04-15	New Mexico
SG	25	Alan Hardy	6 ft 7 in (2.01 m)	195 lb (88 kg)	1957-05-25	Michigan
SG	14	Brad Holland	6 ft 3 in (1.91 m)	180 lb (82 kg)	1956-12-06	UCLA
SG	32	Magic Johnson	6 ft 9 in (2.06 m)	215 lb (98 kg)	1959-08-14	Michigan State
PG	15	Eddie Jordan	6 ft 1 in (1.85 m)	170 lb (77 kg)	1955-01-29	Rutgers
PF	54	Mark Landsberger	6 ft 8 in (2.03 m)	215 lb (98 kg)	1955-05-21	Arizona State
PG	10	Norm Nixon	6 ft 2 in (1.88 m)	170 lb (77 kg)	1955-10-11	Duquesne
SF	52	Jamaal Wilkes	6 ft 6 in (1.98 m)	190 lb (86 kg)	1953-05-02	UCLA

Coaches
Head coach
- Paul Westhead
Assistant(s)
- Pat Riley
- Mike Thibault

Legend
- (DP) Unsigned draft pick
- (FA) Free agent
- (S) Suspended
- Injured

Roster
Updated: December 2, 1980

=== Roster notes ===
- Shooting guard Magic Johnson missed 45 games during the season after suffering a torn cartilage in his left knee on November 18 during a game against the Kansas City Kings.

== Regular season ==
=== Season standings ===
Pacific Division	W	L	PCT	GB	Home	Road	Div
y-Phoenix Suns	57	25	.695	–	36–5	21–20	22–8
x-Los Angeles Lakers	54	28	.659	3.0	30–11	24–17	19–11
x-Portland Trail Blazers	45	37	.549	12.0	30–11	15–26	18–12
Golden State Warriors	39	43	.476	18.0	26–15	13–28	10–20
San Diego Clippers	36	46	.439	21.0	22–19	14–27	14–16
Seattle SuperSonics	34	48	.415	23.0	22–19	12–29	7–23

#	Western Conference				
#	Team	W	L	PCT	GB
1	c-Phoenix Suns	57	25	.695	–
2	y-San Antonio Spurs	52	30	.634	5
3	x-Los Angeles Lakers	54	28	.659	3
4	x-Portland Trail Blazers	45	37	.549	12
5	x-Kansas City Kings	40	42	.488	17
6	x-Houston Rockets	40	42	.488	17
7	Golden State Warriors	39	43	.476	18
8	Denver Nuggets	37	45	.451	20
9	San Diego Clippers	36	46	.439	21
10	Seattle SuperSonics	34	48	.415	23
11	Utah Jazz	28	54	.341	29
12	Dallas Mavericks	15	67	.183	42

Notes

- z, y – division champions
- x – clinched playoff spot

== Game log ==
=== Regular season ===
1980–81 game log
Total: 54-28 (home: 30-11; road: 24-17)
October: 9–2 (home: 5–1; road: 4–1)

Game	Date	Team	Score	High points	High rebounds	High assists	Location Attendance	Record
1	October 10	@ Seattle	W 99-98	Jamaal Wilkes (22)	Kareem Abdul-Jabbar (12)	Magic Johnson (8)	Kingdome; 35,233	1–0
2	October 12	Houston	W 114-103	Magic Johnson (30)	Jim Chones (11)	Magic Johnson (10)	The Forum; 11,142	2–0
3	October 15	@ Kansas City	W 112-107 (OT)	Jamaal Wilkes (31)	Magic Johnson (12)	Magic Johnson (14)	Kemper Arena; 5,753	3–0
4	October 17	Phoenix	W 116-109	Jamaal Wilkes (34)	Jim Chones (16)	Norm Nixon (9)	The Forum; 10,411	4–0
5	October 19	Golden State	W 125-107	Kareem Abdul-Jabbar (29)	Mark Landsberger (12)	Norm Nixon (9)	The Forum; 10,644	5–0
6	October 21	@ Portland	L 103-107	Kareem Abdul-Jabbar (25)	Kareem Abdul-Jabbar (15)	Magic Johnson (5)	Memorial Coliseum; 12,666	5–1
7	October 24	Seattle	W 104-98	Abdul-Jabbar & Wilkes (26)	Jim Chones (15)	Magic Johnson (12)	The Forum; 12,201	6–1
8	October 25	@ Utah	W 127-99	Magic Johnson (33)	Mark Landsberger (12)	Magic Johnson (6)	Salt Palace; 12,058	7–1
9	October 26	San Antonio	L 102-108	Kareem Abdul-Jabbar (30)	Magic Johnson (13)	Magic Johnson (11)	The Forum; 11,906	7–2
10	October 28	@ San Diego	W 131-101	Magic Johnson (29)	Abdul-Jabbar & Landsberger (10)	Magic Johnson (10)	San Diego Sports Arena; 8,663	8–2
11	October 31	Cleveland	W 107-98	Jamaal Wilkes (23)	Jim Chones (13)	Norm Nixon (8)	The Forum; 9,728	9–2

November: 9–6 (home: 5–3; road: 4–3)

Game	Date	Team	Score	High points	High rebounds	High assists	Location Attendance	Record
12	November 2	Denver	L 121-123	Jamaal Wilkes (26)	Kareem Abdul-Jabbar (10)	Magic Johnson (11)	The Forum; 11,661	9–3
13	November 4	Portland	W 119-118	Kareem Abdul-Jabbar (28)	Jim Chones (12)	Magic Johnson (12)	The Forum; 10,100	10–3
14	November 7	@ Dallas	W 126-102	Magic Johnson (32)	Johnson & Landsberger (9)	Norm Nixon (10)	Reunion Arena; 17,481	11–3
15	November 8	@ San Antonio	L 109-112	Magic Johnson (28)	Chones & Johnson (10)	Norm Nixon (15)	HemisFair Arena; 16,114	11–4
16	November 11	@ Atlanta	W 126-97	Jamaal Wilkes (22)	Kareem Abdul-Jabbar (10)	Abdul-Jabbar & Johnson (8)	Omni Coliseum; 11,373	12–4
17	November 12	@ Houston	L 104-107	Jamaal Wilkes (28)	Kareem Abdul-Jabbar (10)	Magic Johnson (11)	The Summit; 11,527	12–5
18	November 14	San Diego	W 113-100	Jamaal Wilkes (22)	Jim Chones (12)	Magic Johnson (10)	The Forum; 11,808	13–5
19	November 16	Dallas	W 110-102	Magic Johnson (24)	Kareem Abdul-Jabbar (11)	Magic Johnson (8)	The Forum; 10,893	14–5
20	November 18	Kansas City	W 107-94	Jamaal Wilkes (32)	Jim Chones (18)	Norm Nixon (14)	The Forum; 10,169	15–5
21	November 20	@ Phoenix	L 99-102	Abdul-Jabbar & Wilkes (29)	Kareem Abdul-Jabbar (8)	Norm Nixon (7)	Arizona Veterans Memorial Coliseum; 12,660	15–6
22	November 21	Phoenix	W 116-88	Kareem Abdul-Jabbar (29)	Kareem Abdul-Jabbar (20)	Norm Nixon (7)	The Forum; 14,164	16–6
23	November 23	Milwaukee	L 94-110	Jamaal Wilkes (27)	Jim Chones (13)	Kareem Abdul-Jabbar (6)	The Forum; 14,814	16–7
24	November 27	@ Golden State	W 128-119	Kareem Abdul-Jabbar (40)	Abdul-Jabbar & Chones (11)	Norm Nixon (12)	Oakland-Alameda County Coliseum Arena; 12,564	17–7
25	November 29	@ Denver	W 124-123 (2OT)	Jamaal Wilkes (30)	Jim Chones (15)	Norm Nixon (7)	McNichols Sports Arena; 14,811	18–7
26	November 30	Chicago	L 108-122	Kareem Abdul-Jabbar (28)	3 players tied (9)	Eddie Jordan (9)	The Forum; 13,605	18–8

December: 8–7 (home: 5–2; road: 3–5)

Game	Date	Team	Score	High points	High rebounds	High assists	Location Attendance	Record
27	December 3	San Diego	L 114-120	Kareem Abdul-Jabbar (33)	Jim Chones (13)	Kareem Abdul-Jabbar (7)	The Forum; 9,346	18–9
28	December 6	@ Golden State	L 103-119	Kareem Abdul-Jabbar (27)	Jim Chones (9)	Norm Nixon (11)	Oakland-Alameda County Coliseum Arena; 13,329	18–10
29	December 7	Utah	W 113-100	Kareem Abdul-Jabbar (24)	Kareem Abdul-Jabbar (17)	Kareem Abdul-Jabbar (8)	The Forum; 11,564	19–10
30	December 9	@ Dallas	W 103-92	Kareem Abdul-Jabbar (29)	Abdul-Jabbar & Chones (11)	Norm Nixon (10)	Reunion Arena; 9,313	20–10
31	December 10	@ Houston	W 109-108	Jamaal Wilkes (32)	Kareem Abdul-Jabbar (9)	Norm Nixon (8)	The Summit; 10,632	21–10
32	December 12	@ Seattle	W 113-107	Kareem Abdul-Jabbar (30)	Kareem Abdul-Jabbar (8)	Kareem Abdul-Jabbar (9)	Kingdome; 22,448	22–10
33	December 14	Golden State	W 122-113	Kareem Abdul-Jabbar (29)	Jim Chones (11)	Norm Nixon (14)	The Forum; 11,643	23–10
34	December 16	@ San Diego	L 92-97	Kareem Abdul-Jabbar (32)	Kareem Abdul-Jabbar (9)	Norm Nixon (8)	San Diego Sports Arena; 9,044	23–11
35	December 19	Portland	L 106-110	Kareem Abdul-Jabbar (34)	Jim Chones (13)	Norm Nixon (10)	The Forum; 12,190	23–12
36	December 21	San Antonio	W 135-122	Kareem Abdul-Jabbar (42)	Kareem Abdul-Jabbar (13)	Norm Nixon (10)	The Forum; 12,341	24–12
37	December 23	@ Portland	L 102-108	Kareem Abdul-Jabbar (42)	Kareem Abdul-Jabbar	Eddie Jordan (6)	Memorial Coliseum; 12,666	24–13
38	December 26	Indiana	W 116-115	Jamaal Wilkes (33)	Kareem Abdul-Jabbar (15)	Norm Nixon (12)	The Forum; 14,345	25–13
39	December 27	@ Phoenix	L 106-116	Kareem Abdul-Jabbar (27)	Jim Chones (10)	Norm Nixon (10)	Arizona Veterans Memorial Coliseum; 12,660	25–14
40	December 28	Philadelphia	W 122-116	Kareem Abdul-Jabbar (34)	Kareem Abdul-Jabbar (13)	Norm Nixon (10)	The Forum; 17,505	26–14
41	December 30	@ Utah	L 100-110	Kareem Abdul-Jabbar (30)	Jim Chones (12)	Eddie Jordan (6)	Salt Palace; 12,393	26–15

January: 10–3 (home: 8–0; road: 2–3)

Game	Date	Team	Score	High points	High rebounds	High assists	Location Attendance	Record
42	January 2	@ San Antonio	L 112-118	Kareem Abdul-Jabbar (36)	Jim Chones (11)	Norm Nixon (15)	HemisFair Arena; 14,722	26–16
43	January 6	Washington	W 107-98	Norm Nixon (30)	Kareem Abdul-Jabbar (16)	Norm Nixon (12)	The Forum; 11,033	27–16
44	January 9	Seattle	W 92-87	Kareem Abdul-Jabbar (28)	Kareem Abdul-Jabbar (16)	Norm Nixon (9)	The Forum; 12,596	28–16
45	January 11	Detroit	W 117-108	Jamaal Wilkes (33)	Kareem Abdul-Jabbar (9)	Norm Nixon (10)	The Forum; 11,195	29–16
46	January 13	@ Cleveland	W 108-104	Kareem Abdul-Jabbar (29)	Abdul-Jabbar & Brewer (8)	Norm Nixon (9)	Richfield Coliseum; 7,316	30–16
47	January 14	@ Washington	L 104-114	Kareem Abdul-Jabbar (25)	Abdul-Jabbar & Cooper (10)	Norm Nixon (7)	Capital Centre; 10,372	30–17
48	January 16	@ New Jersey	W 113-111	Jamaal Wilkes (32)	Kareem Abdul-Jabbar (11)	Norm Nixon (13)	Brendan Byrne Arena; 8,462	31–17
49	January 18	@ Boston	L 96-98	Kareem Abdul-Jabbar (32)	Kareem Abdul-Jabbar (12)	Eddie Jordan (5)	Boston Garden; 15,320	31–18
50	January 21	Atlanta	W 116-106	Jamaal Wilkes (26)	Kareem Abdul-Jabbar (10)	Michael Cooper (9)	The Forum; 10,389	32–18
51	January 23	Denver	W 110-105	Jamaal Wilkes (30)	Kareem Abdul-Jabbar (15)	Norm Nixon (9)	The Forum; 14,813	33–18
52	January 26	Portland	W 124-112	Kareem Abdul-Jabbar (24)	Kareem Abdul-Jabbar (12)	Norm Nixon (18)	The Forum; 10,681	34–18
53	January 27	Utah	W 111-104	Kareem Abdul-Jabbar (27)	Jim Chones (13)	Norm Nixon (12)	The Forum; 10,453	35–18
54	January 29	Kansas City	W 118-104	Kareem Abdul-Jabbar (35)	Kareem Abdul-Jabbar (13)	Cooper & Nixon (10)	The Forum; 11,058	36–18

February: 8–4 (home: 3–2; road: 5–2)

Game	Date	Team	Score	High points	High rebounds	High assists	Location Attendance	Record
All-Star Break
55	February 4	@ Indiana	W 102-96	Kareem Abdul-Jabbar (29)	Kareem Abdul-Jabbar (16)	Michael Cooper (9)	Market Square Arena; 15,966	37–18
56	February 6	@ Detroit	W 111-102	Kareem Abdul-Jabbar (25)	Kareem Abdul-Jabbar (14)	Eddie Jordan (12)	Pontiac Silverdome; 12,205	38–18
57	February 8	@ Philadelphia	L 99-102	Jamaal Wilkes (28)	Kareem Abdul-Jabbar (12)	Abdul-Jabbar & Nixon (5)	The Spectrum; 18,276	38–19
58	February 11	Boston	L 91-105	Kareem Abdul-Jabbar (32)	Michael Cooper (11)	Norm Nixon (10)	The Forum; 17,505	38–20
59	February 13	@ Houston	W 114-105	Kareem Abdul-Jabbar (30)	Kareem Abdul-Jabbar (12)	Norm Nixon (10)	The Summit; 13,985	39–20
60	February 15	Dallas	W 107-99	Kareem Abdul-Jabbar (35)	Kareem Abdul-Jabbar (12)	Norm Nixon (9)	The Forum; 11,920	40–20
61	February 17	New York	W 96-87	Kareem Abdul-Jabbar (28)	Michael Cooper (11)	Michael Cooper (9)	The Forum; 13,279	41–20
62	February 20	Houston	L 107-110	Kareem Abdul-Jabbar (36)	Kareem Abdul-Jabbar (12)	Norm Nixon (12)	The Forum; 14,470	41–21
63	February 22	@ New York	W 96-93	Kareem Abdul-Jabbar (32)	Cooper & Landsberger (9)	Cooper & Nixon (7)	Madison Square Garden; 19,591	42–21
64	February 24	@ Chicago	W 107-97	Norm Nixon (24)	Kareem Abdul-Jabbar (11)	Norm Nixon (13)	Chicago Stadium; 16,518	43–21
65	February 25	@ Milwaukee	L 108-126	Kareem Abdul-Jabbar (29)	Kareem Abdul-Jabbar (13)	Norm Nixon (8)	MECCA Arena; 11,052	43–22
66	February 27	New Jersey	W 107-103	Kareem Abdul-Jabbar (28)	Abdul-Jabbar & Johnson (11)	Cooper & Nixon (7)	The Forum; 17,505	44–22

March: 10–6 (home: 4–3; road: 6–3)

Game	Date	Team	Score	High points	High rebounds	High assists	Location Attendance	Record
67	March 1	Phoenix	L 96-101	Kareem Abdul-Jabbar (28)	Magic Johnson (10)	Norm Nixon (9)	The Forum; 17,505	44–23
68	March 3	@ Kansas City	W 99-98	Kareem Abdul-Jabbar (24)	3 players tied (8)	Norm Nixon (8)	Kemper Arena; 12,208	45–23
69	March 4	@ Denver	L 114-123	Kareem Abdul-Jabbar (26)	Mark Landsberger (10)	Norm Nixon (7)	McNichols Sports Arena; 14,840	45–24
70	March 10	San Antonio	W 118-104	Kareem Abdul-Jabbar (35)	Magic Johnson (16)	Norm Nixon (13)	The Forum; 16,703	46–24
71	March 12	@ San Diego	W 122-116	Jamaal Wilkes (29)	Magic Johnson (9)	Magic Johnson (7)	San Diego Sports Arena; 13,043	47–24
72	March 13	Kansas City	W 116-101	Kareem Abdul-Jabbar (28)	Mark Landsberger (11)	Magic Johnson (11)	The Forum; 17,505	48–24
73	March 15	San Diego	L 118-122	Jamaal Wilkes (27)	Kareem Abdul-Jabbar (9)	Norm Nixon (12)	The Forum; 15,560	48–25
74	March 17	@ Dallas	W 114-109	Kareem Abdul-Jabbar (28)	Magic Johnson (9)	Johnson & Nixon (7)	Reunion Arena; 17,828	49–25
75	March 18	@ Phoenix	L 114-126	Kareem Abdul-Jabbar (27)	Kareem Abdul-Jabbar (8)	Magic Johnson (8)	Arizona Veterans Memorial Coliseum; 12,660	49–26
76	March 20	Seattle	W 133-119	Kareem Abdul-Jabbar (34)	Kareem Abdul-Jabbar (8)	Norm Nixon (10)	The Forum; 17,505	50–26
77	March 21	@ Portland	W 117-111	Kareem Abdul-Jabbar (31)	Kareem Abdul-Jabbar (19)	Norm Nixon (15)	Memorial Coliseum; 12,666	51–26
78	March 22	@ Golden State	W 120-118	Kareem Abdul-Jabbar (31)	Magic Johnson (8)	Norm Nixon (15)	Oakland-Alameda County Coliseum Arena; 13,239	52–26
79	March 24	Golden State	W 110-103	Johnson & Nixon (24)	Magic Johnson (9)	Magic Johnson (11)	The Forum; 17,505	53–26
80	March 27	@ Seattle	W 97-90	Jamaal Wilkes (24)	Kareem Abdul-Jabbar (10)	Magic Johnson (9)	Kingdome; 22,494	54–26
81	March 28	@ Utah	L 110-112 (OT)	Magic Johnson (41)	Johnson & Landsberger (12)	Magic Johnson (11)	Salt Palace; 12,383	54–27
82	March 29	Denver	L 146-148 (OT)	Magic Johnson (33)	Magic Johnson (15)	Magic Johnson (17)	The Forum; 17,505	54–28

1980–81 schedule

=== Playoffs ===
1981 playoff game log
Total: 1–2 (home: 0–2; road: 1–0)
First Round: 1–2 (home: 0–2; road: 1–0)

Game	Date	Team	Score	High points	High rebounds	High assists	Location Attendance	Series
1	April 1	Houston	L 107–111	Magic Johnson (26)	Kareem Abdul-Jabbar (15)	Norm Nixon (10)	The Forum; 15,517	0–1
2	April 3	@ Houston	W 111–106	Kareem Abdul-Jabbar (27)	Magic Johnson (18)	Norm Nixon (11)	The Summit; 16,121	1–1
3	April 5	Houston	L 86–89	Kareem Abdul-Jabbar (32)	Kareem Abdul-Jabbar (18)	Magic Johnson (9)	The Forum; 14,813	1–2

1981 schedule

== Player statistics ==
Note: GP= Games played; MPG= Minutes per Game; REB = Rebounds; AST = Assists; STL = Steals; BLK = Blocks; PTS = Points; PPG = Points per Game

Player	GP	MPG	REB	AST	STL	BLK	PTS	PPG
Kareem Abdul-Jabbar	80	37.2	821	272	59	228	2095	26.2
Jamaal Wilkes	81	37.4	435	235	121	29	1827	22.6
Norm Nixon	79	37.5	232	696	146	11	1350	17.1
Jim Chones	82	31.2	657	153	39	96	882	10.8
Magic Johnson	37	37.1	320	317	127	27	798	21.6
Michael Cooper	81	32.4	336	332	133	78	763	9.4
Mark Landsberger	69	15.7	377	27	19	6	390	5.7
Eddie Jordan	60	16.5	80	195	74	7	306	5.1
Butch Carter	54	12.4	65	52	23	1	301	5.6
Jim Brewer	78	14.2	281	55	43	58	217	2.8
Brad Holland	41	7.2	29	23	21	1	130	3.2
Alan Hardy	22	5.0	19	3	1	9	51	2.3
Myles Patrick	3	3.0	2	1	0	0	5	1.7
Tony Jackson	2	7.0	2	2	2	0	2	1.0

== Award winners/Honors ==
- Kareem Abdul-Jabbar, First Team All-NBA, First Team All-Defense, All-Star
- Michael Cooper, Second Team All-Defense
- Jamaal Wilkes, All-Star
