= 1980–81 Detroit Pistons season =

NBA team season

- Head coach: Scotty Robertson
- General manager: Jack McCloskey
- Owners: William Davidson
- Arena: Pontiac Silverdome

Results
- Record: 21–61 (.256)
- Place: Division: 6th (Central); Conference: 11th (Eastern)
- Playoff finish: Did not qualify
- Stats at Basketball Reference

The 1980–81 Detroit Pistons season was the Detroit Pistons' 33rd season in the NBA and 24th season in the city of Detroit. The team played at the Pontiac Silverdome.

The rebuilding Pistons finished the season with a 21–61 (.256) record, 6th place in the Central Division. The team was led by center Kent Benson (15.7 ppg, 6.8 rpg) and guard John Long (17.7 ppg).

== Draft picks ==
Round	Pick	Player	Position	Nationality	College / Team
1	17	Larry Drew	Guard	United States	Missouri
5	93	Tony Fuller	Guard	United States	Pepperdine

== Roster ==
1980–81 Detroit Pistons roster
Players

Pos.	No.	Player	Height	Weight	DOB	From
C	54	Kent Benson	6 ft 10 in (2.08 m)	235 lb (107 kg)	1954–12–27	Indiana
G	22	Larry Drew	6 ft 1 in (1.85 m)	170 lb (77 kg)	1958–04–02	Missouri
G	33	Keith Herron	6 ft 6 in (1.98 m)	195 lb (88 kg)	1956–06–14	Villanova
SF	35	Phil Hubbard	6 ft 8 in (2.03 m)	215 lb (98 kg)	1956–12–13	Michigan
F	32	Greg Kelser	6 ft 7 in (2.01 m)	205 lb (93 kg)	1957–09–17	Michigan State
G	30	Ron Lee	6 ft 4 in (1.93 m)	193 lb (88 kg)	1952–11–02	Oregon
SG	25	John Long	6 ft 5 in (1.96 m)	195 lb (88 kg)	1956–08–28	Detroit Mercy
C	44	Paul Mokeski	7 ft 0 in (2.13 m)	250 lb (113 kg)	1957–01–03	Kansas
PF	42	Wayne Robinson	6 ft 8 in (2.03 m)	217 lb (98 kg)	1958–04–19	Virginia Tech
G/F	41	Terry Tyler	6 ft 7 in (2.01 m)	215 lb (98 kg)	1956–10–30	Detroit Mercy
PG	15	Larry Wright	6 ft 1 in (1.85 m)	160 lb (73 kg)	1954–11–23	Grambling State

Coaches
Head coach
- Scotty Robertson
Assistant(s)
- Don Chaney

Legend
- (DP) Unsigned draft pick
- (FA) Free agent
- (S) Suspended
- Injured

== Regular season ==
=== Season standings ===
Central Division	W	L	PCT	GB	Home	Road	Div
y-Milwaukee Bucks	60	22	.732	–	34–7	26–15	23–7
x-Chicago Bulls	45	37	.549	15.0	26–15	19–22	20–9
x-Indiana Pacers	44	38	.537	16.0	27–14	17–24	17–12
Atlanta Hawks	31	51	.378	29.0	20–21	11–30	9–21
Cleveland Cavaliers	28	54	.341	32.0	20–21	8–33	9–21
Detroit Pistons	21	61	.256	39.0	14–27	7–34	9–21

#	Eastern Conference				
#	Team	W	L	PCT	GB
1	z-Boston Celtics	62	20	.756	–
2	y-Milwaukee Bucks	60	22	.732	2
3	x-Philadelphia 76ers	62	20	.756	–
4	x-New York Knicks	50	32	.610	12
5	x-Chicago Bulls	45	37	.549	17
6	x-Indiana Pacers	44	38	.537	18
7	Washington Bullets	39	43	.476	23
8	Atlanta Hawks	31	51	.378	31
9	Cleveland Cavaliers	28	54	.341	34
10	New Jersey Nets	24	58	.293	38
11	Detroit Pistons	21	61	.256	41

z - clinched division title
y - clinched division title
x - clinched playoff spot

== Game log ==
=== Regular season ===
1980–81 game log
Total: 21–61 (Home: 14–27; Road: 7–34)
October: 1–9 (home: 0–6; road: 1–3)

Game	Date	Team	Score	High points	High rebounds	High assists	Location Attendance	Record
1	October 10	Washington	L 85–95				Pontiac Silverdome	0–1
2	October 11	@ Indiana	L 87–100				Market Square Arena	0–2
3	October 13	@ New Jersey	L 92–108				Rutgers Athletic Center	0–3
4	October 14	@ Cleveland	L 91–99				Richfield Coliseum	0–4
5	October 16	San Antonio	L 99–102				Pontiac Silverdome	0–5
6	October 18	Atlanta	L 123–125 (2OT)				Pontiac Silverdome	0–6
7	October 22	Philadelphia	L 93–94				Pontiac Silverdome	0–7
8	October 25	@ Houston	W 112–109				The Summit	1–7
9	October 29	Boston	L 85–103				Pontiac Silverdome	1–8
10	October 31	Phoenix	L 98–103 (OT)				Pontiac Silverdome	1–9

November: 7–8 (home: 5–3; road: 2–5)

Game	Date	Team	Score	High points	High rebounds	High assists	Location Attendance	Record
11	November 1	@ Chicago	L 100–122				Chicago Stadium	1–10
12	November 4	@ Milwaukee	W 98–96				MECCA Arena	2–10
13	November 5	@ Philadelphia	L 103–107				The Spectrum	2–11
14	November 7	@ Washington	L 88–114				Capital Centre	2–12
15	November 8	Dallas	W 101–73				Pontiac Silverdome	3–12
16	November 11	@ New York	L 118–149				Madison Square Garden	3–13
17	November 12	Milwaukee	L 98–122				Pontiac Silverdome	3–14
18	November 14	Chicago	W 106–99				Pontiac Silverdome	4–14
19	November 16	@ New Jersey	L 80–89				Rutgers Athletic Center	4–15
20	November 18	Indiana	L 97–102				Pontiac Silverdome	4–16
21	November 20	San Diego	W 97–90				Pontiac Silverdome	5–16
22	November 22	New Jersey	W 117–103				Pontiac Silverdome	6–16
23	November 26	Utah	L 97–104				Pontiac Silverdome	6–17
24	November 28	Kansas City	W 104–94				Pontiac Silverdome	7–17
25	November 29	@ Atlanta	W 98–95				The Omni	8–17

December: 2–12 (home: 2–4; road: 0–8)

Game	Date	Team	Score	High points	High rebounds	High assists	Location Attendance	Record
26	December 2	Boston	L 85–94				Pontiac Silverdome	8–18
27	December 5	@ Washington	L 92–103				Capital Centre	8–19
28	December 6	@ Cleveland	L 100–101				Richfield Coliseum	8–20
29	December 10	Atlanta	L 92–100				Pontiac Silverdome	8–21
30	December 12	Cleveland	W 101–95				Pontiac Silverdome	9–21
31	December 13	@ New York	L 94–100				Madison Square Garden	9–22
32	December 17	New York	L 103–119				Pontiac Silverdome	9–23
33	December 18	@ Milwaukee	L 104–121				MECCA Arena	9–24
34	December 19	Indiana	W 109–106				Pontiac Silverdome	10–24
35	December 21	@ San Diego	L 97–117				San Diego Sports Arena	10–25
36	December 23	@ Phoenix	L 104–113				Arizona Veterans Memorial Coliseum	10–26
37	December 26	Houston	L 94–114				Pontiac Silverdome	10–27
38	December 27	@ Chicago	L 97–104				Chicago Stadium	10–28
39	December 30	@ Atlanta	L 89–96				The Omni	10–29

January: 3–13 (home: 3–5; road: 0–8)

Game	Date	Team	Score	High points	High rebounds	High assists	Location Attendance	Record
40	January 2	New York	W 102–100				Pontiac Silverdome	11–29
41	January 6	@ Portland	L 90–110				Memorial Coliseum	11–30
42	January 7	@ Seattle	L 94–99				Kingdome	11–31
43	January 10	@ Golden State	L 103–105				Oakland–Alameda County Coliseum Arena	11–32
44	January 11	@ Los Angeles	L 108–117				The Forum	11–33
45	January 13	Milwaukee	L 96–119				Pontiac Silverdome	11–34
46	January 14	@ Indiana	L 99–101				Market Square Arena	11–35
47	January 15	Washington	L 89–106				Pontiac Silverdome	11–36
48	January 17	New Jersey	L 103–119				Pontiac Silverdome	11–37
49	January 19	@ Boston	L 90–92				Hartford Civic Center	11–38
50	January 20	Philadelphia	W 83–75				Pontiac Silverdome	12–38
51	January 22	Chicago	L 92–125				Pontiac Silverdome	12–39
52	January 24	Cleveland	W 117–94				Pontiac Silverdome	13–39
53	January 26	@ Utah	L 99–102				Salt Palace Acord Arena	13–40
54	January 27	@ Denver	L 123–143				McNichols Sports Arena	13–41
55	January 29	Golden State	L 112–117				Pontiac Silverdome	13–42

February: 3–10 (home: 2–4; road: 1–6)

Game	Date	Team	Score	High points	High rebounds	High assists	Location Attendance	Record
56	February 3	@ San Antonio	L 99–102				HemisFair Arena	13–43
57	February 4	@ Kansas City	L 90–91				Kemper Arena	13–44
58	February 6	Los Angeles	L 102–111				Pontiac Silverdome	13–45
59	February 7	@ Chicago	L 90–98				Chicago Stadium	13–46
60	February 8	Indiana	L 101–124				Pontiac Silverdome	13–47
61	February 10	@ Dallas	W 101–95				Reunion Arena	14–47
62	February 13	@ New York	L 92–120				Madison Square Garden	14–48
63	February 14	Washington	W 105–103				Pontiac Silverdome	15–48
64	February 17	@ Cleveland	L 108–109				Richfield Coliseum	15–49
65	February 18	@ Philadelphia	L 97–111				The Spectrum	15–50
66	February 19	Portland	L 106–115				Pontiac Silverdome	15–51
67	February 21	Boston	L 119–130				Pontiac Silverdome	15–52
68	February 27	Cleveland	W 118–109				Pontiac Silverdome	16–52

March: 5–9 (home: 2–5; road: 3–4)

Game	Date	Team	Score	High points	High rebounds	High assists	Location Attendance	Record
69	March 1	@ New Jersey	W 117–104				Rutgers Athletic Center	17–52
70	March 3	@ Milwaukee	L 98–115				MECCA Arena	17–53
71	March 5	New York	L 101–104				Pontiac Silverdome	17–54
72	March 7	Denver	L 109–121				Pontiac Silverdome	17–55
73	March 11	Atlanta	W 100–97				Pontiac Silverdome	18–55
73	March 13	Seattle	L 100–102				Pontiac Silverdome	18–56
75	March 14	@ Indiana	W 101–94				Market Square Arena	19–56
76	March 18	New Jersey	W 118–115				Pontiac Silverdome	20–56
77	March 20	Milwaukee	L 86–104				Pontiac Silverdome	20–57
78	March 22	Chicago	L 103–109				Pontiac Silverdome	20–58
79	March 24	@ Atlanta	L 91–96				The Omni	20–59
80	March 25	@ Philadelphia	L 75–114				The Spectrum	20–60
81	March 27	@ Boston	W 115–90				Boston Garden	21–60
82	March 28	@ Washington	L 103–108				Capital Centre	21–61

1980–81 schedule

== Player statistics ==
Legend
GP	Games played	GS	Games started	MPG	Minutes per game
FG%	Field-goal percentage	3P%	3-point field-goal percentage	FT%	Free-throw percentage
RPG	Rebounds per game	APG	Assists per game	SPG	Steals per game
BPG	Blocks per game	PPG	Points per game

Player	GP	GS	MPG	FG%	3FG%	FT%	RPG	APG	SPG	BPG	PPG
Kent Benson											
Norman Black											
Larry Drew											
Tony Fuller											
Keith Herron											
Phil Hubbard											
Lee Johnson											
Greg Kelser											
Edmund Lawrence											
Ron Lee											
John Long											
Bob McAdoo											
Paul Mokeski											
Wayne Robinson											
Terry Tyler											
Larry Wright											

== Transactions ==
=== Free agents ===
Subtractions
Player	Date signed	New team
Terry Duerod	Expansion Draft May 28, 1980	Dallas Mavericks

== See also ==
- 1980–81 NBA season
