= 1980–81 Washington Bullets season =

NBA professional basketball team season

- Head coach: Gene Shue
- Arena: Capital Centre

Results
- Record: 39–43 (.476)
- Place: Division: 4th (Atlantic); Conference: 7th (Eastern)
- Playoff finish: Did not qualify
- Stats at Basketball Reference

Local media
- Television: WDCA
- Radio: WTOP

The 1980–81 Washington Bullets season was the Bullets 20th season in the NBA and their 8th season in the city of Washington, D.C. Following the season, Wes Unseld retired, Elvin Hayes was traded to the Houston Rockets, and Mitch Kupchak signed with the Los Angeles Lakers.

== Draft picks ==
Round	Pick	Player	Position	Nationality	School/Club team
1	14	Wes Matthews	G	United States	Wisconsin
2	35	Rick Mahorn	C/PF	United States	Hampton
4	81	Francois Wise		United States	California State-Long Beach
5	105	Daryl Strickland		United States	Rutgers
6	127	Ken Dancy		United States	Chicago State
7	151	Karl Godine		United States	Stephen F. Austin State
8	170	Rich Valavicius		United States	Auburn
9	191	Clinton Wyatt		United States	Alcorn State
10	207	Don Youman		United States	Oklahoma State

== Roster ==
1980–81 Washington Bullets roster
Players

Pos.	No.	Player	Height	Weight	DOB	From
F	42	Greg Ballard	6 ft 7 in (2.01 m)	215 lb (98 kg)		Oregon
SG	34	Austin Carr	6 ft 4 in (1.93 m)	200 lb (91 kg)		Notre Dame
G/F	22	Don Collins	6 ft 6 in (1.98 m)	190 lb (86 kg)		Washington State
SF	10	Bob Dandridge	6 ft 6 in (1.98 m)	195 lb (88 kg)		Norfolk State
F	35	Kevin Grevey	6 ft 5 in (1.96 m)	210 lb (95 kg)		Kentucky
C	11	Elvin Hayes	6 ft 9 in (2.06 m)	235 lb (107 kg)		Houston
PF	25	Mitch Kupchak	6 ft 9 in (2.06 m)	230 lb (104 kg)		North Carolina
PF	44	Rick Mahorn	6 ft 10 in (2.08 m)	240 lb (109 kg)		Hampton
G	33	Andre McCarter	6 ft 3 in (1.91 m)	190 lb (86 kg)		UCLA
PG	1	Kevin Porter	6 ft 0 in (1.83 m)	170 lb (77 kg)		Saint Francis (PA)
F	20	Anthony Roberts	6 ft 5 in (1.96 m)	185 lb (84 kg)		Oral Roberts
G	12	Carlos Terry	6 ft 5 in (1.96 m)	210 lb (95 kg)		Winston-Salem State
F	41	Wes Unseld	6 ft 7 in (2.01 m)	245 lb (111 kg)		Louisville

Coaches
Head coach
- Gene Shue
Assistant(s)
- Bernie Bickerstaff

Legend
- (DP) Unsigned draft pick
- (FA) Free agent
- (S) Suspended
- Injured

== Regular season ==
=== Season standings ===
Atlantic Division	W	L	PCT	GB	Home	Road	Div
y-Boston Celtics	62	20	.756	–	35–6	27–14	19–5
x-Philadelphia 76ers	62	20	.756	–	37–4	25–16	15–9
x-New York Knicks	50	32	.610	12.0	28–13	22–19	14–10
Washington Bullets	39	43	.476	23.0	26–15	13–28	8–16
New Jersey Nets	24	58	.293	38.0	16–25	8–33	8–16

#	Eastern Conference				
#	Team	W	L	PCT	GB
1	z-Boston Celtics	62	20	.756	–
2	y-Milwaukee Bucks	60	22	.732	2
3	x-Philadelphia 76ers	62	20	.756	–
4	x-New York Knicks	50	32	.610	12
5	x-Chicago Bulls	45	37	.549	17
6	x-Indiana Pacers	44	38	.537	18
7	Washington Bullets	39	43	.476	23
8	Atlanta Hawks	31	51	.378	31
9	Cleveland Cavaliers	28	54	.341	34
10	New Jersey Nets	24	58	.293	38
11	Detroit Pistons	21	61	.256	41

Notes

- z, y – division champions
- x – clinched playoff spot

== Game log ==
=== Regular season ===
1980–81 game log
Total: 39–43 (Home: 26–15; Road: 13–28)
October: 2–8 (home: 1–3; road: 1–5)

Game	Date	Team	Score	High points	High rebounds	High assists	Location Attendance	Record
1	October 10	@ Detroit	W 95–85				Pontiac Silverdome	1–0
2	October 11	Philadelphia	L 120–126 (2OT)				Capital Centre	1–1
3	October 16	@ Cleveland	L 88–90				Richfield Coliseum	1–2
4	October 17	New Jersey	L 112–114				Capital Centre	1–3
5	October 18	@ Philadelphia	L 101–117				The Spectrum	1–4
6	October 22	Cleveland	W 109–96				Capital Centre	2–4
7	October 24	@ Chicago	L 96–104				Chicago Stadium	2–5
8	October 25	Boston	L 87–103				Capital Centre	2–6
9	October 26	@ Milwaukee	L 88–111				MECCA Arena	2–7
10	January 25	@ New Jersey	L 98–100				Rutgers Athletic Center	2–8

November : 8–6 (home: 7–1; road: 1–5)

Game	Date	Team	Score	High points	High rebounds	High assists	Location Attendance	Record
11	November 1	@ New York	L 93–111				Madison Square Garden	2–9
12	November 4	Atlanta	W 122–98				Capital Centre	3–9
13	November 6	Dallas	W 116–95				Capital Centre	4–9
14	November 7	Detroit	W 114–88				Capital Centre	5–9
15	November 11	Denver	W 107–92				Capital Centre	6–9
16	November 12	@ Boston	L 86–93				Boston Garden	6–10
17	November 14	@ Indiana	L 108–118				Market Square Arena	6–11
18	November 15	@ Atlanta	W 100–88				The Omni	7–11
19	November 18	Golden State	L 97–103				Capital Centre	7–12
20	November 21	San Diego	W 102–90				Capital Centre	8–12
21	November 22	@ Chicago	L 101–114				Chicago Stadium	8–13
22	November 27	Indiana	W 123–108				Capital Centre	9–13
24	November 28	@ Cleveland	L 105–126				Richfield Coliseum	9–14
24	November 29	Milwaukee	W 98–89				Capital Centre	10–14

December : 6–8 (home: 5–4; road: 1–4)

Game	Date	Team	Score	High points	High rebounds	High assists	Location Attendance	Record
25	December 2	Kansas City	W 107–103				Capital Centre	11–14
26	December 3	@ Indiana	L 115–128				Market Square Arena	11–15
27	December 5	Detroit	W 103–92				Capital Centre	12–15
28	December 7	@ Boston (at Hartford, Connecticut)	W 113–103				Hartford Civic Center	13–15
29	December 9	@ New York	L 104–107				Madison Square Garden	13–16
30	December 10	Boston	L 99–101				Capital Centre	13–17
31	December 12	@ Philadelphia	L 79–95				The Spectrum	13–18
32	December 13	Indiana	W 114–105				Capital Centre	14–18
33	December 16	Chicago	L 94–96				Capital Centre	14–19
34	December 19	New York	L 96–102				Capital Centre	14–20
35	December 23	@ Atlanta	L 83–100				The Omni	14–21
36	December 25	New Jersey	W 109–94				Capital Centre	15–21
37	December 27	Houston	W 115–97				Capital Centre	16–21
38	December 30	Milwaukee	L 94–115				Capital Centre	16–22

January : 10–6 (home: 6–2; road: 4–4)

Game	Date	Team	Score	High points	High rebounds	High assists	Location Attendance	Record
39	January 2	Chicago	L 82–92				Capital Centre	16–23
40	January 3	@ Cleveland	L 112–132				Richfield Coliseum	16–24
41	January 6	@ Los Angeles	L 98–107				The Forum	16–25
42	January 8	@ Kansas City	L 118–136				Kemper Arena	16–26
43	January 10	@ Dallas	W 106–94				Reunion Arena	17–26
44	January 11	@ San Antonio	L 106–137				HemisFair Arena	17–27
45	January 14	Los Angeles	W 114–104				Capital Centre	18–27
46	January 15	@ Detroit	W 106–89				Pontiac Silverdome	19–27
47	January 17	San Antonio	W 103–93				Capital Centre	20–27
48	January 18	New Jersey	W 110–99				Capital Centre	21–27
49	January 20	Utah	W 121–113				Capital Centre	22–27
50	January 22	Philadelphia	L 116–128				Capital Centre	22–28
51	January 23	Seattle	W 103–91				Capital Centre	23–28
54	January 25	@ New Jersey	W 118–100				Rutgers Athletic Center	24–28
53	January 27	@ Atlanta	W 105–104				The Omni	25–28
54	January 28	Phoenix	W 108–98				Capital Centre	26–28

February : 5–8 (home: 2–2; road: 3–6)

Game	Date	Team	Score	High points	High rebounds	High assists	Location Attendance	Record
55	February 3	@ Portland	L 104–111 (OT)				Memorial Coliseum	26–29
56	February 4	@ Seattle	L 99–108				Kingdome	26–30
57	February 6	@ Golden State	W 116–110				Oakland–Alameda County Coliseum Arena	27–30
58	February 8	@ Phoenix	L 107–113 (OT)				Arizona Veterans Memorial Coliseum	27–31
59	February 10	@ Denver	W 115–110				McNichols Sports Arena	28–31
60	February 13	@ Philadelphia	W 104–102				The Spectrum	29–31
61	February 14	@ Detroit	L 103–105				Pontiac Silverdome	29–32
62	February 17	Portland	L 104–124				Capital Centre	29–33
63	February 19	Philadelphia	W 129–108				Capital Centre	30–33
64	February 20	@ New York	L 112–124				Madison Square Garden	30–34
65	February 22	Milwaukee	L 93–102				Capital Centre	30–35
66	February 25	New York	W 120–105				Capital Centre	31–35
67	February 27	@ Chicago	L 100–112				Chicago Stadium	31–36

March : 8–7 (home: 5–3; road: 3–4)

Game	Date	Team	Score	High points	High rebounds	High assists	Location Attendance	Record
68	March 1	@ Milwaukee	L 107–137				MECCA Arena	31–37
69	March 3	@ Utah	W 121–113				Salt Palace Acord Arena	32–37
70	March 4	@ San Diego	W 115–103				San Diego Sports Arena	33–37
71	March 6	@ Houston	W 105–104				The Summit	34–37
72	March 8	Chicago	W 103–99				Capital Centre	35–37
73	March 11	@ New Jersey	L 104–109				Rutgers Athletic Center	35–38
74	March 12	Indiana	L 107–114				Capital Centre	35–39
75	March 15	Cleveland	L 100–101				Capital Centre	35–40
76	March 17	Boston	L 91–112				Capital Centre	35–41
77	March 20	@ Boston	L 116–128				Boston Garden	35–42
78	March 22	Atlanta	W 121–101				Capital Centre	36–42
79	March 25	New York	W 120–105				Capital Centre	37–42
80	March 27	@ Indiana	L 107–122				Market Square Arena	37–43
81	March 28	Detroit	W 108–103				Capital Centre	38–43
82	March 29	Cleveland	W 138–103				Capital Centre	39–43

1980–81 schedule

== Player statistics ==
Legend
GP	Games played	GS	Games started	MPG	Minutes per game
FG%	Field-goal percentage	3P%	3-point field-goal percentage	FT%	Free-throw percentage
RPG	Rebounds per game	APG	Assists per game	SPG	Steals per game
BPG	Blocks per game	PPG	Points per game

Player	GP	GS	MPG	FG%	3FG%	FT%	RPG	APG	SPG	BPG	PPG
Greg Ballard											
Dave Britton											
Lewis Brown											
Austin Carr											
Don Collins											
Bob Dandridge											
Kevin Grevey											
Elvin Hayes											
Mitch Kupchak											
Rick Mahorn											
Wes Matthews											
Andre McCarter											
Keith McCord											
Kevin Porter											
Anthony Roberts											
Carlos Terry											
Wes Unseld											
John Williamson											

== Transactions ==
=== Trades ===
September 26, 1980
January 17, 1981
To Washington Bullets----
- 1981 2nd round draft pick
- 1982 2nd round draft pick
To Washington Bullets----
- Don Collins
To San Antonio Spurs----
- Dave Corzine
To Atlanta Hawks----
- Wes Matthews

=== Free agents ===
Player	Signed	Former team
Austin Carr	November 6, 1980	Dallas Mavericks

Subtractions
Player	Date signed	New team
Jim Cleamons	Expansion Draft May 28, 1980	Dallas Mavericks
John Williamson	December 3, 1980	
