= Keith McCord =

American basketball player

Personal information
- Born: June 22, 1957 (age 69) Birmingham, Alabama, U.S.
- Listed height: 6 ft 7 in (2.01 m)
- Listed weight: 210 lb (95 kg)

Career information
- High school: West End (Birmingham, Alabama)
- College: Alabama (1975–1978); UAB (1979–1980)
- NBA draft: 1979: 10th round, 198th overall pick
- Drafted by: Philadelphia 76ers
- Position: Shooting guard
- Number: 22

Career history
- 1980: Washington Bullets
- Stats at NBA.com
- Stats at Basketball Reference

Keith Rennae McCord (born June 22, 1957) is an American former basketball player. He played college basketball for the Alabama Crimson Tide and UAB Blazers. A 10th-round draft pick of the Philadelphia 76ers, McCord played two games in the National Basketball Association (NBA) for the Washington Bullets, scoring four total points.

== Career statistics ==
Legend
| GP | Games played | GS | Games started | MPG | Minutes per game |
| FG% | Field goal percentage | 3P% | 3-point field goal percentage | FT% | Free throw percentage |
| RPG | Rebounds per game | APG | Assists per game | SPG | Steals per game |
| BPG | Blocks per game | PPG | Points per game | **Bold** | Career high |

=== NBA ===
==== Regular season ====
| Year | Team | GP | MPG | FG% | 3P% | FT% | RPG | APG | SPG | BPG | PPG |
|---|---|---|---|---|---|---|---|---|---|---|---|
| 1980–81 | Washington | 2 | 4.5 | .500 | – | – | 1.0 | .5 | .0 | .0 | 2.0 |
