= Dwight Jones (basketball) =

American basketball player

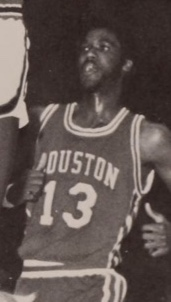
- Jones with the Houston Cougars in the 1971–72 season

Personal information
- Born: February 27, 1952 Houston, Texas, U.S.
- Died: July 25, 2016 (aged 64) The Woodlands, Texas, U.S.
- Listed height: 6 ft 10 in (2.08 m)
- Listed weight: 210 lb (95 kg)

Career information
- High school: Wheatley (Houston, Texas)
- College: Houston (1970–1973)
- NBA draft: 1973: 1st round, 9th overall pick
- Drafted by: Atlanta Hawks
- Playing career: 1973–1984
- Position: Power forward / center
- Number: 13

Career history
- 1973–1976: Atlanta Hawks
- 1976–1979: Houston Rockets
- 1979–1983: Chicago Bulls
- 1983: Los Angeles Lakers
- 1983–1984: Bic Trieste

Career highlights
- Second-team Parade All-American (1970)

Career NBA statistics
- Points: 6,230 (8.1 ppg)
- Rebounds: 4,513 (5.9 rpg)
- Assists: 911 (1.2 apg)
- Stats at NBA.com
- Stats at Basketball Reference
Medals
Men's basketball
Representing United States
Olympic Games
Silver medal – second place	1972 Munich	Team

Dwight Elmo Jones (February 27, 1952 – July 25, 2016) was an American professional basketball player. A 6'10" forward/center, he was the leading scorer and rebounder on the 1972 Olympic team that lost the controversial gold medal game to the Soviet Union. Jones was ejected from the gold medal game after an altercation with a Soviet player. Later it was revealed that the Soviets intentionally provoked him as they saw him as the leader of the U.S. team and wanted to get him out.

Jones attended E.O. Smith Education Center and Wheatley High School.

After playing college basketball at the University of Houston from 1970 to 1973, Jones was selected as the 9th overall pick in 1973 NBA draft by the Atlanta Hawks. Jones played for ten seasons in the NBA from 1973 to 1983 with four teams: Atlanta, the Houston Rockets, the Chicago Bulls, and the Los Angeles Lakers. The 6 ft 10 in power forward/center averaged 8.1 points in 766 career regular season games.

His son, Dwight Jones II, played at Houston Baptist University. A 6'3" guard, Jones II was named the Red River Athletic Conference Player of the Year in 2005–06 and 2006–07 while also being named an NAIA All-America both seasons.

Jones died on July 25, 2016.

== Career statistics ==
Legend
GP	Games played	GS	Games started	MPG	Minutes per game
FG%	Field goal percentage	3P%	3-point field goal percentage	FT%	Free throw percentage
RPG	Rebounds per game	APG	Assists per game	SPG	Steals per game
BPG	Blocks per game	PPG	Points per game	**Bold**	Career high

=== NBA ===
==== Regular season ====
Year	Team	GP	GS	MPG	FG%	3P%	FT%	RPG	APG	SPG	BPG	PPG
1973–74	Atlanta	74		19.6	.474		.744	6.1	1.2	.4	**.9**	8.0
1974–75	Atlanta	75		27.8	.430		.721	**9.3**	**2.0**	.7	.7	**10.4**
1975–76	Atlanta	66		26.7	.463		.744	7.9	1.3	.8	**.9**	10.1
1976–77	Houston	74		16.7	.494		**.802**	3.8	.6	.5	.3	5.9
1977–78	Houston	**82**		**30.2**	.445		.777	7.8	1.3	**.9**	.5	**10.6**
1978–79	Houston	81		15.0	.458		.727	4.0	.7	.4	.3	5.7
1979–80	Houston	21		13.2	.420	–	.750	3.4	.5	.2	.2	6.0
1979–80	Chicago	53	0	22.1	**.535**	–	.721	5.6	1.7	.5	.7	10.1
1980–81	Chicago	81	9	19.4	.483	–	.776	5.0	1.2	.5	.4	7.6
1981–82	Chicago	78	**18**	26.2	.530	**1.000**	.723	6.5	1.5	.6	.5	10.0
1982–83	Chicago	49	2	13.7	.446	–	.627	4.0	.8	.4	.3	4.5
1982–83	L.A. Lakers	32	0	15.3	.470	.000	.667	3.6	.7	.4	.3	4.9
Career		766	29	21.5	.471	.500	.740	5.9	1.2	.6	.5	8.1

==== Playoffs ====
Year	Team	GP	MPG	FG%	3P%	FT%	RPG	APG	SPG	BPG	PPG
1977	Houston	**12**	20.5	.444		.783	4.3	1.3	.7	.3	6.2
1979	Houston	2	16.5	**.538**		**1.000**	6.0	1.5	.5	**2.0**	10.0
1981	Chicago	6	**36.2**	.475	–	**1.000**	**9.8**	**1.8**	**.8**	.5	**12.5**
1983	L.A. Lakers	7	8.4	.313	–	.400	1.7	.0	.1	.0	1.7
Career		27	20.6	.451	–	.843	5.0	1.1	.6	.4	6.7
