= Alan Hardy (basketball) =

American basketball player

Personal information
- Born: May 25, 1957 (age 69) Detroit, Michigan, U.S.
- Listed height: 6 ft 7 in (2.01 m)
- Listed weight: 195 lb (88 kg)

Career information
- High school: Northwestern (Detroit, Michigan)
- College: Michigan (1975–1979)
- NBA draft: 1979: undrafted
- Position: Shooting guard
- Number: 25, 24

Career history
- 1980–1981: Los Angeles Lakers
- 1981–1982: Detroit Pistons
- 1982–1983: Detroit Spirits

Career highlights
- CBA champion (1983)
- Stats at NBA.com
- Stats at Basketball Reference

Alan Timothy Hardy (born May 25, 1957) is an American former professional basketball shooting guard who played two seasons in the National Basketball Association (NBA) as a member of the Los Angeles Lakers (1980–81) and the Detroit Pistons (1981–82). He attended the University of Michigan.

Hardy played for the Detroit Spirits of the Continental Basketball Association (CBA) during the 1982–83 season and won the CBA championship.

== Career statistics ==
Legend
GP	Games played	GS	Games started	MPG	Minutes per game
FG%	Field goal percentage	3P%	3-point field goal percentage	FT%	Free throw percentage
RPG	Rebounds per game	APG	Assists per game	SPG	Steals per game
BPG	Blocks per game	PPG	Points per game	**Bold**	Career high

=== NBA ===
==== Regular season ====
Year	Team	GP	GS	MPG	FG%	3P%	FT%	RPG	APG	SPG	BPG	PPG
1980–81	L.A. Lakers	22		5.0	.373	–	**.700**	**.9**	.1	.0	**.4**	2.3
1981–82	Detroit	**38**	0	**8.2**	**.456**	.000	.621	**.9**	**.5**	**.2**	.1	**3.7**
Career		60	0	7.0	.431	.000	.641	.9	.4	.2	.2	3.2
