= 1980–81 Utah Jazz season =

NBA professional basketball team season

- Head coach: Tom Nissalke
- General manager: Frank Layden
- Owners: Sam Battistone; Larry Hatfield
- Arena: Salt Palace

Results
- Record: 28–54 (.341)
- Place: Division: 5th (Midwest); Conference: 11th (Western)
- Playoff finish: Did not qualify
- Stats at Basketball Reference

Local media
- Television: KSL-TV
- Radio: KSL

The 1980–81 Utah Jazz season was the team's seventh in the NBA. They began the season hoping to improve upon their 24–58 output from the previous season. The team started the season 12–6 but lost 15 of the next 17 games, however they bested it by four wins, finishing 28–54, but failed to qualify for the playoffs for the seventh straight season.

== Draft picks ==
Round	Pick	Player	Position	Nationality	College
1	2	Darrell Griffith	SG	United States	Louisville
1	19	John Duren	PG	United States	Georgetown
4	72	Alan Taylor		United States	Brigham Young
5	94	Wally West		United States	Boston University
6	118	Ken Cunningham	G	United States	Western Michigan
7	140	Dave Colescott		United States	North Carolina
8	163	Jim Brandon		United States	St. Peter's
9	181	Paul Renfro		United States	Texas-Arlington
10	201	Leroy Coleman		United States	Middle Tennessee State

== Roster ==
1980–81 Utah Jazz roster
Players

Pos.	No.	Player	Height	Weight	DOB	From
PF	33	Mel Bennett	6 ft 7 in (2.01 m)	200 lb (91 kg)	1955–01–04	Pittsburgh
SF	44	Allan Bristow	6 ft 7 in (2.01 m)	210 lb (95 kg)	1951–08–23	Virginia Tech
SG	24	Ron Boone	6 ft 2 in (1.88 m)	200 lb (91 kg)	1946–09–06	Idaho State
SF	4	Adrian Dantley	6 ft 5 in (1.96 m)	208 lb (94 kg)	1955–02–28	Notre Dame
PG	18	John Duren	6 ft 3 in (1.91 m)	195 lb (88 kg)	1958–10–30	Georgetown
F/C	40	Wayne Cooper	6 ft 10 in (2.08 m)	220 lb (100 kg)	1956–11–16	LSU New Orleans
PG	14	Rickey Green	6 ft 0 in (1.83 m)	170 lb (77 kg)	1954–08–18	Michigan
SG	35	Darrell Griffith	6 ft 4 in (1.93 m)	190 lb (86 kg)	1958–06–16	Louisville
PF	11	James Hardy	6 ft 8 in (2.03 m)	220 lb (100 kg)	1956–12–01	San Francisco
F	5	Jeff Judkins	6 ft 6 in (1.98 m)	185 lb (84 kg)	1956–03–23	Utah
G	12	Carl Nicks	6 ft 1 in (1.85 m)	175 lb (79 kg)	1958–10–06	Indiana State
C	50	Ben Poquette	6 ft 9 in (2.06 m)	235 lb (107 kg)	1955–05–07	Central Michigan
C	45	Jeff Wilkins	6 ft 11 in (2.11 m)	230 lb (104 kg)	1955–03–09	Illinois State

Coaches
Head coach
- Tom Nissalke
Assistant(s)
- Bill Bertka
- Gene Littles

Legend
- (DP) Unsigned draft pick
- (FA) Free agent
- (S) Suspended
- Injured

== Regular season ==
=== Season standings ===
Midwest Division	W	L	PCT	GB	Home	Road	Div
y-San Antonio Spurs	52	30	.634	–	34–7	18–23	21–9
x-Kansas City Kings	40	42	.488	12.0	24–17	16–25	19–11
x-Houston Rockets	40	42	.488	12.0	25–16	15–26	19–11
Denver Nuggets	37	45	.451	15.0	23–18	14–27	13–17
Utah Jazz	28	54	.341	24.0	20–21	8–33	13–17
Dallas Mavericks	15	67	.183	37.0	11–30	4–37	5–25

#	Western Conference				
#	Team	W	L	PCT	GB
1	c-Phoenix Suns	57	25	.695	–
2	y-San Antonio Spurs	52	30	.634	5
3	x-Los Angeles Lakers	54	28	.659	3
4	x-Portland Trail Blazers	45	37	.549	12
5	x-Kansas City Kings	40	42	.488	17
6	x-Houston Rockets	40	42	.488	17
7	Golden State Warriors	39	43	.476	18
8	Denver Nuggets	37	45	.451	20
9	San Diego Clippers	36	46	.439	21
10	Seattle SuperSonics	34	48	.415	23
11	Utah Jazz	28	54	.341	29
12	Dallas Mavericks	15	67	.183	42

Notes

- z, y – division champions
- x – clinched playoff spot

=== Game log ===
1980–81 game log
Total: 28–54 (home: 20–21; road: 8–33)
October: 0–0 (home: 0–0; road: 0–0)

Game	Date	Team	Score	High points	High rebounds	High assists	Location Attendance	Record

November: 0–0 (home: 0–0; road: 0–0)

Game	Date	Team	Score	High points	High rebounds	High assists	Location Attendance	Record

December: 0–0 (home: 0–0; road: 0–0)

Game	Date	Team	Score	High points	High rebounds	High assists	Location Attendance	Record

January: 0–0 (home: 0–0; road: 0–0)

Game	Date	Team	Score	High points	High rebounds	High assists	Location Attendance	Record

February: 0–0 (home: 0–0; road: 0–0)

Game	Date	Team	Score	High points	High rebounds	High assists	Location Attendance	Record

March: 0–0 (home: 0–0; road: 0–0)

Game	Date	Team	Score	High points	High rebounds	High assists	Location Attendance	Record

1980–81 schedule

== Player statistics ==
Legend
GP	Games played	GS	Games started	MPG	Minutes per game
FG%	Field-goal percentage	3P%	3-point field-goal percentage	FT%	Free-throw percentage
RPG	Rebounds per game	APG	Assists per game	SPG	Steals per game
BPG	Blocks per game	PPG	Points per game

Player	GP	GS	MPG	FG%	3FG%	FT%	RPG	APG	SPG	BPG	PPG
Mel Bennett											
Ron Boone											
Allan Bristow											
Wayne Cooper											
Adrian Dantley											
John Duren											
Rickey Green											
Darrell Griffith											
James Hardy											
Jeff Judkins											
Billy McKinney											
Dick Miller											
Carl Nicks											
Ben Poquette											
Brett Vroman											
Jeff Wilkins											

== Awards and records ==
- Darrell Griffith, NBA Rookie of the Year Award
- Adrian Dantley, All-NBA Second Team
- Darrell Griffith, NBA All-Rookie Team 1st Team

== Transactions ==
=== Free agents ===
Subtractions
Player	Date signed	New team
Jerome Whitehead	Expansion Draft May 28, 1980	Dallas Mavericks
Paul Dawkins	October 6, 1980	
