= 1980–81 Philadelphia 76ers season =

NBA professional basketball team season

- Head coach: Billy Cunningham
- General manager: Pat Williams
- Arena: The Spectrum

Results
- Record: 62–20 (.756)
- Place: Division: 2nd (Atlantic); Conference: 3rd (Eastern)
- Playoff finish: Eastern Conference finals (lost to Celtics 3–4)
- Stats at Basketball Reference

Local media
- Television: WKBS-TV; PRISM
- Radio: WIP

The 1980–81 Philadelphia 76ers season was the team's 32nd season in the NBA and 18th season in Philadelphia The team finished the regular season with a 62–20 record, however they lost the tie breaker with the Boston Celtics who had the home court advantage with the same regular season record. In the playoffs, they lost a seven-game series to the Boston Celtics, in the Eastern Conference finals, after having a three games to one series lead. This was the second time this occurred between the two teams (other in 1968), and the final 3 games of the series were decided by 5 points total. Julius Erving would win the Most Valuable Player of the League.

== Draft picks ==
Round	Pick	Player	Position	Nationality	College
1	8	Andrew Toney	SG	United States	Louisiana-Lafayette
1	21	Monti Davis	F	United States	Tennessee State
2	44	Clyde Austin		United States	North Carolina State
3	67	Reggie Gaines		United States	Winston-Salem State
4	85	Billy Bryant		United States	Western Kentucky
4	90	Harold Hubbard		United States	Savannah State
5	113	Jim Swaney		United States	Toledo
6	136	Donald Cooper		United States	St. Augustine's
7	159	Richard Smith		United States	Weber State
8	177	Martin Lemelle		United States	Grambling State
9	198	Luke Griffin		United States	St. Joseph's
10	213	Joe Hand		United States	King's College

== Roster ==
1980–81 Philadelphia 76ers roster
Players

Pos.	No.	Player	Height	Weight	DOB	From
G	10	Maurice Cheeks	6 ft 1 in (1.85 m)	180 lb (82 kg)	1956–09–08	West Texas A&M
G	20	Doug Collins (injured)	6 ft 6 in (1.98 m)	180 lb (82 kg)	1951–07–28	Illinois State
F	25	Earl Cureton	6 ft 9 in (2.06 m)	210 lb (95 kg)	1957–09–03	Detroit Mercy
C	53	Darryl Dawkins	6 ft 11 in (2.11 m)	251 lb (114 kg)	1957–01–11	Maynard Evans HS (FL)
F	6	Julius Erving	6 ft 6 in (1.98 m)	210 lb (95 kg)	1950–02–22	UMass
G	9	Lionel Hollins	6 ft 3 in (1.91 m)	185 lb (84 kg)	1953–10–19	Arizona State
F	18	Ollie Johnson	6 ft 6 in (1.98 m)	200 lb (91 kg)	1949–05–11	Temple
F	24	Bobby Jones	6 ft 9 in (2.06 m)	210 lb (95 kg)	1951–12–18	North Carolina
C	11	Caldwell Jones	6 ft 11 in (2.11 m)	217 lb (98 kg)	1950–08–04	Albany State
G	4	Clint Richardson	6 ft 3 in (1.91 m)	195 lb (88 kg)	1956–08–07	Seattle
F	50	Steve Mix	6 ft 7 in (2.01 m)	215 lb (98 kg)	1947–12–30	Toledo
G	22	Andrew Toney	6 ft 3 in (1.91 m)	178 lb (81 kg)	1957–11–23	Louisiana

Coaches
Head coach
- Billy Cunningham
Assistant(s)
- Chuck Daly
- Jack McMahon

Legend
- (DP) Unsigned draft pick
- (FA) Free agent
- (S) Suspended
- Injured

== Regular season ==
=== Season standings ===
Atlantic Division	W	L	PCT	GB	Home	Road	Div
y-Boston Celtics	62	20	.756	–	35–6	27–14	19–5
x-Philadelphia 76ers	62	20	.756	–	37–4	25–16	15–9
x-New York Knicks	50	32	.610	12.0	28–13	22–19	14–10
Washington Bullets	39	43	.476	23.0	26–15	13–28	8–16
New Jersey Nets	24	58	.293	38.0	16–25	8–33	8–16

#	Eastern Conference				
#	Team	W	L	PCT	GB
1	z-Boston Celtics	62	20	.756	–
2	y-Milwaukee Bucks	60	22	.732	2
3	x-Philadelphia 76ers	62	20	.756	–
4	x-New York Knicks	50	32	.610	12
5	x-Chicago Bulls	45	37	.549	17
6	x-Indiana Pacers	44	38	.537	18
7	Washington Bullets	39	43	.476	23
8	Atlanta Hawks	31	51	.378	31
9	Cleveland Cavaliers	28	54	.341	34
10	New Jersey Nets	24	58	.293	38
11	Detroit Pistons	21	61	.256	41

z - clinched division title
y - clinched division title
x - clinched playoff spot

== Game log ==
=== Regular season ===
1980–81 game log
Total: 62–20 (home: 37–4; road: 25–16)
October: 8–2 (home: 3–1; road: 5–1)

Game	Date	Team	Score	High points	High rebounds	High assists	Location Attendance	Record
1
2
3
4
5
6
7
8
9
10

November: 15–1 (home: 8–1; road: 7–0)

Game	Date	Team	Score	High points	High rebounds	High assists	Location Attendance	Record
11
12
13
14
15
16
17
18
19
20
21
22
23
24
25
26

December: 10–4 (home: 6–0; road: 4–4)

Game	Date	Team	Score	High points	High rebounds	High assists	Location Attendance	Record
27
28
29
30
31
32
33
34
35
36
37
38
39
40

January: 11–3 (home: 7–0; road: 4–3)

Game	Date	Team	Score	High points	High rebounds	High assists	Location Attendance	Record
41
42
43
44
45
46
47
48
49
50
51
52
53
54

February: 10–3 (home: 7–1; road: 3–2)

Game	Date	Team	Score	High points	High rebounds	High assists	Location Attendance	Record
55
56
57
58
59
60
61
62
63
64
65
66
67

March: 8–7 (home: 6–1; road: 2–6)

Game	Date	Team	Score	High points	High rebounds	High assists	Location Attendance	Record
68
69
70
71
72
73
74
75
76
77
78
79
80
81
82

1980–81 schedule

=== Playoffs ===
1981 playoff game log
First Round: 2–0 (home: 1–0; road: 1–0)

Game	Date	Team	Score	High points	High rebounds	High assists	Location Attendance	Series
1	March 31	Indiana	W 124–108	Julius Erving (32)	Caldwell Jones (12)	Andrew Toney (11)	Spectrum; 7,288	1–0
2	April 2	@ Indiana	W 96–85	Julius Erving (23)	Caldwell Jones (11)	Maurice Cheeks (6)	Market Square Arena; 8,921	2–0

Conference semifinals: 4–3 (home: 3–1; road: 1–2)

Game	Date	Team	Score	High points	High rebounds	High assists	Location Attendance	Series
1	April 5	Milwaukee	W 125–122	Julius Erving (38)	Caldwell Jones (11)	Caldwell Jones (7)	Spectrum; 9,727	1–0
2	April 7	Milwaukee	L 99–109	Bobby Jones (22)	Julius Erving (13)	Maurice Cheeks (6)	Spectrum; 15,259	1–1
3	April 10	@ Milwaukee	W 108–103	Erving, Dawkins (23)	Caldwell Jones (13)	Maurice Cheeks (9)	MECCA Arena; 11,052	2–1
4	April 12	@ Milwaukee	L 98–109	Julius Erving (22)	Caldwell Jones (8)	Maurice Cheeks (8)	MECCA Arena; 11,052	2–2
5	April 15	Milwaukee	W 116–99	Cheeks, Hollins (20)	Julius Erving (9)	Maurice Cheeks (10)	Spectrum; 15,384	3–2
6	April 17	@ Milwaukee	L 86–109	Julius Erving (25)	Julius Erving (7)	Maurice Cheeks (7)	MECCA Arena; 11,052	3–3
7	April 19	Milwaukee	W 99–98	Julius Erving (28)	Caldwell Jones (12)	Maurice Cheeks (11)	Spectrum; 6,704	4–3

Conference finals: 3–4 (home: 2–1; road: 1–3)

Game	Date	Team	Score	High points	High rebounds	High assists	Location Attendance	Series
1	April 21	@ Boston	W 105–104	Andrew Toney (26)	Julius Erving (9)	Maurice Cheeks (8)	Boston Garden; 15,320	1–0
2	April 22	@ Boston	L 118–99	Andrew Toney (35)	Dawkins, Toney (7)	Andrew Toney (7)	Boston Garden; 15,320	1–1
3	April 24	Boston	W 110–100	Julius Erving (22)	Caldwell Jones (14)	Maurice Cheeks (8)	Spectrum; 18,276	2–1
4	April 26	Boston	W 107–105	Julius Erving (20)	Caldwell Jones (10)	Maurice Cheeks (10)	Spectrum; 18,276	3–1
5	April 29	@ Boston	L 109–111	Lionel Hollins (23)	Darryl Dawkins (8)	Erving, Hollins (5)	Boston Garden; 15,320	3–2
6	May 1	Boston	L 98–100	Darryl Dawkins (24)	Caldwell Jones (8)	Maurice Cheeks (8)	Spectrum; 18,276	3–3
7	May 3	@ Boston	L 90–91	Julius Erving (23)	Caldwell Jones (15)	Maurice Cheeks (7)	Boston Garden; 15,320	3–4

1981 schedule

== Player statistics ==
Legend
GP	Games played	GS	Games started	MPG	Minutes per game
FG%	Field-goal percentage	3P%	3-point field-goal percentage	FT%	Free-throw percentage
RPG	Rebounds per game	APG	Assists per game	SPG	Steals per game
BPG	Blocks per game	PPG	Points per game

== Awards and records ==
- Julius Erving, NBA Most Valuable Player Award
- Julius Erving, All-NBA First Team
- Bobby Jones, NBA All-Defensive First Team
- Caldwell Jones, NBA All-Defensive First Team

== Transactions ==
=== Free agents ===
Subtractions
Player	Date signed	New team
Jim Spanarkel	Expansion Draft May 28, 1980	Dallas Mavericks

== See also ==
- 1980-81 NBA season
