= 1980–81 New Jersey Nets season =

NBA professional basketball team season

- Head coach: Kevin Loughery; Bob MacKinnon
- Arena: Rutgers Athletic Center

Results
- Record: 24–58 (.293)
- Place: Division: 5th (Atlantic); Conference: 10th (Eastern)
- Playoff finish: Did not qualify
- Stats at Basketball Reference

The 1980–81 New Jersey Nets season was the Nets' fifth season in the NBA. It was their final season of play at the Rutgers Athletic Center in Piscataway, as the team moved to Brendan Byrne Arena in the Meadowlands for the following season.

== Draft picks ==
| Round | Pick | Player | Position | Nationality | College |
|---|---|---|---|---|---|
| 1 | 6 | Mike O'Koren | SF | United States | North Carolina |
| 1 | 7 | Mike Gminski | C | United States | Duke |
| 3 | 52 | Lowes Moore | PG | United States | West Virginia |
| 4 | 75 | Rory Sparrow | PF | United States | Villanova |
| 5 | 98 | Aaron Curry | | United States | Oklahoma |
| 6 | 121 | Rick Mattick | | United States | Louisiana State |
| 7 | 144 | Larry Spicer | | United States | Alabama-Birmingham |
| 8 | 165 | Lloyd Terry | | United States | New Orleans |
| 9 | 185 | Barry Young | | United States | Colorado State |

== Roster ==
1980–81 New Jersey Nets roster
Players

| Pos. | No. | Player | Height | Weight | DOB | From |
|---|---|---|---|---|---|---|
| G | 12 | Darwin Cook | 6 ft 3 in (1.91 m) | 184 lb (83 kg) | 1958–08–06 | Portland |
| C | 42 | Mike Gminski | 6 ft 11 in (2.11 m) | 250 lb (113 kg) | 1959–08–03 | Duke |
| F | 43 | Edgar Jones | 6 ft 10 in (2.08 m) | 225 lb (102 kg) | 1956–06–17 | Nevada |
| F | 20 | Maurice Lucas | 6 ft 9 in (2.06 m) | 215 lb (98 kg) | 1952–02–18 | Marquette |
| F/C | 21 | Bob McAdoo | 6 ft 9 in (2.06 m) | 210 lb (95 kg) | 1951–09–25 | North Carolina |
| G | 11 | Lowes Moore | 6 ft 1 in (1.85 m) | 170 lb (77 kg) | 1957–05–05 | West Virginia |
| G | 14 | Mike Newlin | 6 ft 4 in (1.93 m) | 200 lb (91 kg) | 1949–01–02 | Utah |
| F | 31 | Mike O'Koren | 6 ft 7 in (2.01 m) | 207 lb (94 kg) | 1958–02–07 | North Carolina |
| F | 44 | Cliff Robinson | 6 ft 9 in (2.06 m) | 220 lb (100 kg) | 1960–03–13 | USC |
| G | 34 | Rory Sparrow | 6 ft 2 in (1.88 m) | 175 lb (79 kg) | 1958–06–12 | Villanova |
| F | 20 | Jan van Breda Kolff | 6 ft 7 in (2.01 m) | 195 lb (88 kg) | 1951–12–16 | Vanderbilt |
| G | 10 | Foots Walker | 6 ft 0 in (1.83 m) | 184 lb (83 kg) | 1951–05–21 | West Georgia |

Coaches
Head coach
- Bob MacKinnon
Assistant(s)
- Phil Jackson

Legend
- (DP) Unsigned draft pick
- (FA) Free agent
- (S) Suspended
- Injured

== Regular season ==
=== Season standings ===
| Atlantic Division | W | L | PCT | GB | Home | Road | Div |
|---|---|---|---|---|---|---|---|
| y-Boston Celtics | 62 | 20 | .756 | – | 35–6 | 27–14 | 19–5 |
| x-Philadelphia 76ers | 62 | 20 | .756 | – | 37–4 | 25–16 | 15–9 |
| x-New York Knicks | 50 | 32 | .610 | 12.0 | 28–13 | 22–19 | 14–10 |
| Washington Bullets | 39 | 43 | .476 | 23.0 | 26–15 | 13–28 | 8–16 |
| New Jersey Nets | 24 | 58 | .293 | 38.0 | 16–25 | 8–33 | 8–16 |

| # | Eastern Conference | | | | |
| # | Team | W | L | PCT | GB |
|---|---|---|---|---|---|
| 1 | z-Boston Celtics | 62 | 20 | .756 | – |
| 2 | y-Milwaukee Bucks | 60 | 22 | .732 | 2 |
| 3 | x-Philadelphia 76ers | 62 | 20 | .756 | – |
| 4 | x-New York Knicks | 50 | 32 | .610 | 12 |
| 5 | x-Chicago Bulls | 45 | 37 | .549 | 17 |
| 6 | x-Indiana Pacers | 44 | 38 | .537 | 18 |
| 7 | Washington Bullets | 39 | 43 | .476 | 23 |
| 8 | Atlanta Hawks | 31 | 51 | .378 | 31 |
| 9 | Cleveland Cavaliers | 28 | 54 | .341 | 34 |
| 10 | New Jersey Nets | 24 | 58 | .293 | 38 |
| 11 | Detroit Pistons | 21 | 61 | .256 | 41 |

== See also ==
- 1980–81 NBA season
