= 1980–81 Atlanta Hawks season =

NBA professional basketball team season

- Head coach: Hubie Brown (fired); Mike Fratello (interim)
- General manager: Stan Kasten
- Owner: Ted Turner
- Arena: Omni Coliseum

Results
- Record: 31–51 (.378)
- Place: Division: 4th (Central); Conference: 8th (Eastern)
- Playoff finish: Did not qualify
- Stats at Basketball Reference

Local media
- Television: WTBS; SuperStation WTBS
- Radio: WSB

The 1980–81 Atlanta Hawks season was the Hawks' 32nd season in the NBA and 13th season in Atlanta.

== Draft picks ==
Round	Pick	Player	Position	Nationality	College
1	18	Don Collins	SF/SG	United States	Washington State
2	28	Craig Shelton		United States	Georgetown
5	110	Mike Doyle		United States	South Carolina
6	133	Mike Zagardo		United States	George Washington
7	156	Charles Hightower		United States	Dillard
9	195	Stanley Lamb		United States	Franciscan University of Steubenville

== Roster ==
1980–81 Atlanta Hawks roster
Players

Pos.	No.	Player	Height	Weight	DOB	From
C	16	Tommy Burleson	7 ft 2 in (2.18 m)	225 lb (102 kg)	1952–02–24	NC State
G	44	Art Collins	6 ft 4 in (1.93 m)	185 lb (84 kg)	1954–04–14	St. Thomas (FL)
G	14	Charlie Criss	5 ft 8 in (1.73 m)	165 lb (75 kg)	1948–11–06	New Mexico State
G/F	22	John Drew	6 ft 6 in (1.98 m)	205 lb (93 kg)	1954–09–30	Gardner–Webb
C	10	Steve Hawes	6 ft 9 in (2.06 m)	220 lb (100 kg)	1950–05–26	Washington
G	3	Eddie Johnson	6 ft 2 in (1.88 m)	180 lb (82 kg)	1955–02–24	Auburn
G	1	Wes Matthews	6 ft 1 in (1.85 m)	170 lb (77 kg)	1959–08–24	Wisconsin
G	33	Jim McElroy	6 ft 3 in (1.91 m)	190 lb (86 kg)	1953–10–04	Central Michigan
C	54	Tom McMillen	6 ft 11 in (2.11 m)	215 lb (98 kg)	1952–05–26	Maryland
F	41	Sam Pellom	6 ft 9 in (2.06 m)	225 lb (102 kg)	1951–10–02	Buffalo
C	30	Tree Rollins (injured)	7 ft 1 in (2.16 m)	235 lb (107 kg)	1955–06–16	Clemson
F	32	Dan Roundfield	6 ft 8 in (2.03 m)	205 lb (93 kg)	1953–05–26	Central Michigan
F	11	Craig Shelton	6 ft 7 in (2.01 m)	210 lb (95 kg)	1957–05–01	Georgetown

Coaches
Head coach
- Mike Fratello
Assistant(s)
- Brendan Suhr

Legend
- (DP) Unsigned draft pick
- (FA) Free agent
- (S) Suspended
- (L) On leave from the team
- Injured

Roster
Updated: March 26, 1981

== Regular season ==
=== Season standings ===
Central Division	W	L	PCT	GB	Home	Road	Div
y-Milwaukee Bucks	60	22	.732	–	34–7	26–15	23–7
x-Chicago Bulls	45	37	.549	15.0	26–15	19–22	20–9
x-Indiana Pacers	44	38	.537	16.0	27–14	17–24	17–12
Atlanta Hawks	31	51	.378	29.0	20–21	11–30	9–21
Cleveland Cavaliers	28	54	.341	32.0	20–21	8–33	9–21
Detroit Pistons	21	61	.256	39.0	14–27	7–34	9–21

#	Eastern Conference				
#	Team	W	L	PCT	GB
1	z-Boston Celtics	62	20	.756	–
2	y-Milwaukee Bucks	60	22	.732	2
3	x-Philadelphia 76ers	62	20	.756	–
4	x-New York Knicks	50	32	.610	12
5	x-Chicago Bulls	45	37	.549	17
6	x-Indiana Pacers	44	38	.537	18
7	Washington Bullets	39	43	.476	23
8	Atlanta Hawks	31	51	.378	31
9	Cleveland Cavaliers	28	54	.341	34
10	New Jersey Nets	24	58	.293	38
11	Detroit Pistons	21	61	.256	41

z - clinched division title
y - clinched division title
x - clinched playoff spot

== Player statistics ==
Legend
GP	Games played	GS	Games started	MPG	Minutes per game
FG%	Field-goal percentage	3P%	3-point field-goal percentage	FT%	Free-throw percentage
RPG	Rebounds per game	APG	Assists per game	SPG	Steals per game
BPG	Blocks per game	PPG	Points per game

Player	GP	GS	MPG	FG%	3P%	FT%	RPG	APG	SPG	BPG	PPG
John Drew	67		31.0	45.6	0.0	78.7	5.7	1.2	1.5	0.2	21.7
Eddie Johnson	75		35.9	50.4	30.0	78.4	2.4	5.4	1.7	0.1	19.1
Dan Roundfield	63		33.8	52.7	0.0	72.1	10.1	2.6	1.2	1.9	17.6
Don Collins	47		25.2	43.4	0.0	84.6	4.0	2.4	1.5	0.2	12.7
Wes Matthews	34		32.5	48.8	0.0	83.7	2.1	6.2	1.8	0.2	12.5
Steve Hawes	74		31.2	52.3	25.0	79.9	7.6	2.3	1.0	0.4	12.0
Charlie Criss	66		25.9	45.4	4.8	86.4	1.5	4.3	0.9	0.0	9.5
Tom McMillen	79		19.8	48.7	16.7	74.1	3.7	0.9	0.3	0.3	7.4
Tree Rollins	40		26.1	55.2	0.0	80.7	7.2	0.9	0.7	2.9	7.0
Sam Pellom	77		19.1	48.9	0.0	69.8	4.6	0.6	0.6	1.2	5.9
Armond Hill	24		26.0	33.6	0.0	84.0	2.1	4.9	1.1	0.1	5.0
Craig Shelton	55		10.7	45.7	0.0	60.3	2.5	0.5	0.3	0.1	4.3
Jim McElroy	54		12.6	38.6	12.5	81.4	0.9	1.6	0.4	0.2	3.8
Tom Burleson	31		11.7	41.4	0.0	48.8	3.0	0.4	0.3	0.6	3.3
Art Collins	29		13.6	35.4	0.0	66.7	1.4	0.9	0.4	0.0	3.2

Player statistics citation:

== Awards and records ==
- Dan Roundfield, NBA All-Defensive Second Team

== See also ==
- 1980-81 NBA season
