= 1980–81 Cleveland Cavaliers season =

NBA professional basketball team season

- Head coach: Bill Musselman (25–46); Don Delaney (3–8)
- General manager: Don Delaney
- Owner: Ted Stepien
- Arena: Coliseum at Richfield

Results
- Record: 28–54 (.341)
- Place: Division: 5th (Central); Conference: 9th (Eastern)
- Playoff finish: Did not qualify
- Stats at Basketball Reference

Local media
- Television: WUAB
- Radio: WWWE

The 1980-81 Cleveland Cavaliers season was the 11th season of the franchise in the National Basketball Association (NBA).

== Draft picks ==
| Round | Pick | Player | Nationality | School/Club team |

== Roster ==
1980–81 Cleveland Cavaliers roster
Players

| Pos. | No. | Player | Height | Weight | DOB | From |
|---|---|---|---|---|---|---|
| G | 11, 23 | Mike Bratz | 6 ft 2 in (1.88 m) | 185 lb (84 kg) | | Stanford |
| F | 32 | Kenny Carr | 6 ft 7 in (2.01 m) | 220 lb (100 kg) | | NC State |
| G | 21 | Mack Calvin | 6 ft 0 in (1.83 m) | 165 lb (75 kg) | | USC |
| F | 35 | Don Ford | 6 ft 9 in (2.06 m) | 215 lb (98 kg) | | UC Santa Barbara |
| G | 20 | Geoff Huston | 6 ft 2 in (1.88 m) | 175 lb (79 kg) | | Texas Tech |
| F | 40 | Walter Jordan | 6 ft 7 in (2.01 m) | 198 lb (90 kg) | | Purdue |
| C | 41 | Bill Laimbeer | 6 ft 11 in (2.11 m) | 245 lb (111 kg) | | Notre Dame |
| F | 30 | Mike Mitchell | 6 ft 7 in (2.01 m) | 215 lb (98 kg) | | Auburn |
| G | 15 | Roger Phegley | 6 ft 6 in (1.98 m) | 205 lb (93 kg) | | Bradley |
| G | 9 | Randy Smith | 6 ft 3 in (1.91 m) | 185 lb (84 kg) | | Buffalo State |
| F | 31 | Richard Washington | 6 ft 11 in (2.11 m) | 220 lb (100 kg) | | UCLA |

Coaches
Head coach
- Don Delaney
Assistant(s)
- Larry Creger
- Gerald Oliver

Legend
- (DP) Unsigned draft pick
- (FA) Free agent
- (S) Suspended
- Injured

== Regular season ==
=== Season standings ===
| Central Division | W | L | PCT | GB | Home | Road | Div |
|---|---|---|---|---|---|---|---|
| y-Milwaukee Bucks | 60 | 22 | .732 | – | 34–7 | 26–15 | 23–7 |
| x-Chicago Bulls | 45 | 37 | .549 | 15.0 | 26–15 | 19–22 | 20–9 |
| x-Indiana Pacers | 44 | 38 | .537 | 16.0 | 27–14 | 17–24 | 17–12 |
| Atlanta Hawks | 31 | 51 | .378 | 29.0 | 20–21 | 11–30 | 9–21 |
| Cleveland Cavaliers | 28 | 54 | .341 | 32.0 | 20–21 | 8–33 | 9–21 |
| Detroit Pistons | 21 | 61 | .256 | 39.0 | 14–27 | 7–34 | 9–21 |

| # | Eastern Conference | | | | |
| # | Team | W | L | PCT | GB |
|---|---|---|---|---|---|
| 1 | z-Boston Celtics | 62 | 20 | .756 | – |
| 2 | y-Milwaukee Bucks | 60 | 22 | .732 | 2 |
| 3 | x-Philadelphia 76ers | 62 | 20 | .756 | – |
| 4 | x-New York Knicks | 50 | 32 | .610 | 12 |
| 5 | x-Chicago Bulls | 45 | 37 | .549 | 17 |
| 6 | x-Indiana Pacers | 44 | 38 | .537 | 18 |
| 7 | Washington Bullets | 39 | 43 | .476 | 23 |
| 8 | Atlanta Hawks | 31 | 51 | .378 | 31 |
| 9 | Cleveland Cavaliers | 28 | 54 | .341 | 34 |
| 10 | New Jersey Nets | 24 | 58 | .293 | 38 |
| 11 | Detroit Pistons | 21 | 61 | .256 | 41 |

Notes

- z, y – division champions
- x – clinched playoff spot

== Game log ==
1980–81 game log
Total: 28–54 (Home: 20–21; Road: 8–33)
October: 4–8 (home: 3–3; road: 1–5)

| Game | Date | Team | Score | High points | High rebounds | High assists | Location Attendance | Record |

November: 4–10 (home: 4–3; road: 0–7)

| Game | Date | Team | Score | High points | High rebounds | High assists | Location Attendance | Record |
|---|---|---|---|---|---|---|---|---|
| 19 | November 13, 1980 | Atlanta | W 114–111 | | | | Coliseum at Richfield; 3,987 | 5–14 |

December: 5–9 (home: 4–5; road: 1–4)

| Game | Date | Team | Score | High points | High rebounds | High assists | Location Attendance | Record |

January: 9–5 (home: 5–2; road: 4–3)

| Game | Date | Team | Score | High points | High rebounds | High assists | Location Attendance | Record |
|---|---|---|---|---|---|---|---|---|
| 43 | January 9, 1981 | @ Atlanta | W 108–107 (OT) | | | | The Omni; 9,398 | 16–27 |
| 51 | January 23, 1981 | @ Atlanta | W 106–98 | | | | The Omni; 9,820 | 20–31 |

February: 3–9 (home: 3–4; road: 0–5)

| Game | Date | Team | Score | High points | High rebounds | High assists | Location Attendance | Record |
|---|---|---|---|---|---|---|---|---|
All-Star Break
| 64 | February 21, 1981 | Atlanta | L 105–118 | | | | Coliseum at Richfield; 8,231 | 25–39 |

March: 3–13 (home: 1–4; road: 2–9)

| Game | Date | Team | Score | High points | High rebounds | High assists | Location Attendance | Record |
|---|---|---|---|---|---|---|---|---|
| 73 | March 14, 1981 | @ Atlanta | W 112–110 (OT) | | | | The Omni; 7,368 | 26–47 |
| 75 | March 17, 1981 | Atlanta | W 122–107 | | | | Coliseum at Richfield; 4,288 | 28–47 |

1980–81 schedule

== Player statistics ==
Legend
| GP | Games played | GS | Games started | MPG | Minutes per game |
| FG% | Field-goal percentage | 3P% | 3-point field-goal percentage | FT% | Free-throw percentage |
| RPG | Rebounds per game | APG | Assists per game | SPG | Steals per game |
| BPG | Blocks per game | PPG | Points per game |

| Player | GP | GS | MPG | FG% | 3FG% | FT% | RPG | APG | SPG | BPG | PPG |
|---|---|---|---|---|---|---|---|---|---|---|---|
| Mike Mitchell | 82 | | 39.0 | 47.6 | 44.4 | 78.4 | 6.1 | 1.7 | 0.8 | 0.6 | 24.5 |
| Kenny Carr | 81 | | 32.3 | 51.1 | 0.0 | 71.4 | 10.3 | 2.4 | 0.9 | 0.5 | 15.2 |
| Randy Smith | 82 | | 26.8 | 46.6 | 3.6 | 81.5 | 2.4 | 4.4 | 1.4 | 0.2 | 14.6 |
| Roger Phegley | 82 | | 27.7 | 49.1 | 28.6 | 83.9 | 3.0 | 2.2 | 0.8 | 0.2 | 14.4 |
| Mike Bratz | 80 | | 32.4 | 39.0 | 33.7 | 81.1 | 2.5 | 5.7 | 1.7 | 0.2 | 10.0 |
| Richard Washington | 69 | | 21.8 | 45.9 | 50.0 | 75.0 | 5.3 | 1.6 | 0.6 | 0.8 | 9.9 |
| Bill Laimbeer | 81 | | 30.4 | 50.3 | 0.0 | 76.5 | 8.6 | 2.7 | 0.7 | 1.0 | 9.8 |
| Dave Robisch | 11 | | 33.8 | 37.8 | 0.0 | 80.6 | 7.7 | 4.0 | 0.6 | 0.5 | 9.4 |
| Robert Smith | 1 | | 20.0 | 40.0 | 0.0 | 100.0 | 3.0 | 3.0 | 0.0 | 0.0 | 8.0 |
| Geoff Huston | 25 | | 21.7 | 49.7 | 0.0 | 81.5 | 1.6 | 4.7 | 0.5 | 0.0 | 7.0 |
| Bill Robinzine | 8 | | 10.5 | 43.8 | 0.0 | 62.5 | 1.6 | 0.6 | 0.5 | 0.0 | 4.1 |
| Don Ford | 64 | | 15.6 | 44.6 | 0.0 | 91.7 | 2.6 | 1.3 | 0.2 | 0.2 | 3.5 |
| Chad Kinch | 29 | | 8.5 | 39.6 | 0.0 | 80.0 | 0.8 | 1.2 | 0.3 | 0.2 | 2.8 |
| Mack Calvin | 21 | | 6.1 | 33.3 | 20.0 | 71.4 | 0.6 | 1.3 | 0.2 | 0.0 | 2.5 |
| Walter Jordan | 30 | | 6.9 | 38.7 | 0.0 | 58.8 | 1.4 | 0.4 | 0.4 | 0.2 | 2.3 |
| John Lambert | 3 | | 2.7 | 60.0 | 0.0 | 0.0 | 1.0 | 1.0 | 0.0 | 0.0 | 2.0 |
| Jerome Whitehead | 3 | | 2.7 | 33.3 | 0.0 | 0.0 | 1.0 | 0.0 | 0.3 | 0.0 | 0.7 |

Player statistics citation:

== Transactions ==
=== Free agents ===
Subtractions
| Player | Date signed | New team |
|---|---|---|
| Austin Carr | Expansion Draft May 28, 1980 | Dallas Mavericks |
