= 1980–81 Chicago Bulls season =

NBA professional basketball team season

- Head coach: Jerry Sloan
- General manager: Rod Thorn
- Owner(s): Arthur Wirtz and Jonathan Kovler
- Arena: Chicago Stadium

Results
- Record: 45–37 (.549)
- Place: Division: 2nd (Central); Conference: 5th (Eastern)
- Playoff finish: Conference semifinals (lost to Celtics 0–4)
- Stats at Basketball Reference

Local media
- Television: WGN-TV/ONTV (Milo Hamilton, Johnny “Red” Kerr)
- Radio: WVON (Jim Durham, Norm Van Lier)

The 1980–81 Chicago Bulls season was the Bulls' 15th season in the NBA and their first season in the Eastern Conference.

== Draft picks ==
Round	Pick	Player	Position	Nationality	College
1	4	Kelvin Ransey	PG	United States	Ohio State
2	26	Sam Worthen	SG	United States	Marquette
3	50	James Wilkes	SF	United States	UCLA
4	74	Ron Charles	PF/C	United States	Michigan State
5	96	Mike Campbell		United States	Northwestern
6	120	Bernard Rencher		United States	St. John's
7	142	Robert Byrd		United States	Marquette
8	164	Modzel Greer		United States	North Park
9	183	Jay Shidler		United States	Kentucky
10	203	Billy Foster		United States	Montana State-Billings

== Roster ==
1980–81 Chicago Bulls roster
Players

Pos.	No.	Player	Height	Weight	DOB	From
C	26	Coby Dietrick	6 ft 10 in (2.08 m)	220 lb (100 kg)	1948–07–23	San José State
C	53	Artis Gilmore	7 ft 2 in (2.18 m)	240 lb (109 kg)	1949–09–21	Jacksonville
F	34	Dave Greenwood	6 ft 9 in (2.06 m)	222 lb (101 kg)	1957–05–27	UCLA
F	13	Dwight Jones	6 ft 10 in (2.08 m)	210 lb (95 kg)	1952–02–27	Houston
F	35	Larry Kenon	6 ft 9 in (2.06 m)	205 lb (93 kg)	1952–12–13	Memphis
G	12	Ronnie Lester	6 ft 2 in (1.88 m)	175 lb (79 kg)	1959–01–01	Iowa
F	7	Scott May	6 ft 7 in (2.01 m)	215 lb (98 kg)	1954–03–19	Indiana
G	40	Ricky Sobers	6 ft 3 in (1.91 m)	198 lb (90 kg)	1953–01–15	UNLV
G	24	Reggie Theus	6 ft 7 in (2.01 m)	190 lb (86 kg)	1957–10–13	UNLV
G	33	Bob Wilkerson	6 ft 6 in (1.98 m)	195 lb (88 kg)	1954–08–15	Indiana
F	32	James Wilkes	6 ft 7 in (2.01 m)	195 lb (88 kg)	1958–04–01	UCLA
G	31	Sam Worthen	6 ft 5 in (1.96 m)	195 lb (88 kg)	1958–01–17	Marquette

Coaches
Head coach
- Jerry Sloan
Assistant(s)
- Phil Johnson

Legend
- (DP) Unsigned draft pick
- (FA) Free agent
- (S) Suspended
- Injured

Roster
Updated: November 21, 1980

== Regular season ==
=== Season standings ===
Central Division	W	L	PCT	GB	Home	Road	Div
y-Milwaukee Bucks	60	22	.732	–	34–7	26–15	23–7
x-Chicago Bulls	45	37	.549	15.0	26–15	19–22	20–9
x-Indiana Pacers	44	38	.537	16.0	27–14	17–24	17–12
Atlanta Hawks	31	51	.378	29.0	20–21	11–30	9–21
Cleveland Cavaliers	28	54	.341	32.0	20–21	8–33	9–21
Detroit Pistons	21	61	.256	39.0	14–27	7–34	9–21

#	Eastern Conference				
#	Team	W	L	PCT	GB
1	z-Boston Celtics	62	20	.756	–
2	y-Milwaukee Bucks	60	22	.732	2
3	x-Philadelphia 76ers	62	20	.756	–
4	x-New York Knicks	50	32	.610	12
5	x-Chicago Bulls	45	37	.549	17
6	x-Indiana Pacers	44	38	.537	18
7	Washington Bullets	39	43	.476	23
8	Atlanta Hawks	31	51	.378	31
9	Cleveland Cavaliers	28	54	.341	34
10	New Jersey Nets	24	58	.293	38
11	Detroit Pistons	21	61	.256	41

z - clinched division title
y - clinched division title
x - clinched playoff spot

== Game log ==
=== Regular season ===
1980–81 game log
Total: 45–37 (home: 26–15; road: 19–22)
October: 3–7 (home: 2–3; road: 1–4)

Game	Date	Team	Score	High points	High rebounds	High assists	Location Attendance	Record

November : 7–7 (home: 4–3; road: 3–4)

Game	Date	Team	Score	High points	High rebounds	High assists	Location Attendance	Record
15	November 9	@ Boston	L 105–111				Boston Garden	6–9
19	November 18	Boston	L 112–113				Chicago Stadium	7–12

December : 9–6 (home: 6–2; road: 3–4)

Game	Date	Team	Score	High points	High rebounds	High assists	Location Attendance	Record
31	December 13	Boston	L 95–106				Chicago Stadium	12–19
33	December 17	@ Boston	L 98–115				Boston Garden	13–20
35	December 20	Houston	W 133–109				Chicago Stadium	15–20

January : 8–7 (home: 5–4; road: 3–3)

Game	Date	Team	Score	High points	High rebounds	High assists	Location Attendance	Record
43	January 9	@ Boston	L 111–117				Boston Garden	21–22
46	January 14	@ Houston	L 105–109				The Summit	21–25
54	January 29	Boston	W 108–85				Chicago Stadium	27–27

February : 7–8 (home: 4–3; road: 3–5)

Game	Date	Team	Score	High points	High rebounds	High assists	Location Attendance	Record
All-Star Break

March : 11–2 (home: 5–0; road: 6–2)

Game	Date	Team	Score	High points	High rebounds	High assists	Location Attendance	Record

1980–81 schedule

=== Playoffs ===
1981 playoff game log
Eastern Conference First Round: 2–0 (home: 1–0; road: 1–0)

Game	Date	Team	Score	High points	High rebounds	High assists	Location Attendance	Series
1	March 31	@ New York	W 90–80	Sobers (18)	Gilmore (16)	Sobers (6)	Madison Square Garden; 14,822	1–0
2	April 3	New York	W 115–114 (OT)	Theus (37)	Jones (14)	Theus (11)	Chicago Stadium; 19,901	2–0

Eastern Conference Semifinals: 0–4 (home: 0–2; road: 0–2)

Game	Date	Team	Score	High points	High rebounds	High assists	Location Attendance	Series
1	April 5	@ Boston	L 109–121	Jones (19)	Jones (9)	Jones, Sobers (4)	Boston Garden; 15,320	0–1
2	April 7	@ Boston	L 97–106	Theus (21)	Gilmore, Jones (10)	three players tied (4)	Boston Garden; 15,320	0–2
3	April 10	Boston	L 107–113	Theus (26)	Greenwood (12)	Theus (8)	Chicago Stadium; 19,995	0–3
4	April 12	Boston	L 103–109	Greenwood (24)	Gilmore (15)	Sobers, Theus (7)	Chicago Stadium; 18,249	0–4

1981 schedule

== Player statistics ==
Legend
GP	Games played	GS	Games started	MPG	Minutes per game
FG%	Field-goal percentage	3P%	3-point field-goal percentage	FT%	Free-throw percentage
RPG	Rebounds per game	APG	Assists per game	SPG	Steals per game
BPG	Blocks per game	PPG	Points per game

=== Regular season ===
Player	GP	GS	MPG	FG%	3P%	FT%	RPG	APG	SPG	BPG	PPG
Coby Dietrick											
Artis Gilmore											
Dave Greenwood											
Dwight Jones											
Larry Kenon											
Ronnie Lester											
Ollie Mack											
Scott May											
Ricky Sobers											
Reggie Theus											
Bob Wilkerson											
James Wilkes											
Sam Worthen											

=== Playoffs ===
Player	GP	GS	MPG	FG%	3P%	FT%	RPG	APG	SPG	BPG	PPG
Coby Dietrick											
Artis Gilmore											
Dave Greenwood											
Dwight Jones											
Larry Kenon											
Ronnie Lester											
Scott May											
Ricky Sobers											
Reggie Theus											
Bob Wilkerson											
James Wilkes											
Sam Worthen											

== Awards and records ==
- Artis Gilmore, NBA All-Star Game
- Reggie Theus, NBA All-Star Game

== Transactions ==
=== Free agents ===
Subtractions
Player	Date signed	New team
Del Beshore	Expansion Draft May 28, 1980	Dallas Mavericks
John Mengelt	September 9, 1980	Golden State Warriors
Ollie Mack	October 23, 1980	Dallas Mavericks

== See also ==
- 1980-81 NBA season
