= 1980–81 New York Knicks season =

Season of National Basketball Association team the New York Knicks

- Head coach: Red Holzman
- General manager: Eddie Donovan
- Owners: Gulf+Western / Paramount Communications
- Arena: Madison Square Garden

Results
- Record: 50–32 (.610)
- Place: Division: 3rd (Atlantic); Conference: 4th (Eastern)
- Playoff finish: First round (lost to Bulls 0–2)
- Stats at Basketball Reference

Local media
- Television: WOR-TV; MSG Network
- Radio: WNEW

The 1980–81 New York Knicks season was the 35th season for the team in the National Basketball Association (NBA). In the regular season, the Knicks finished in third place in the Atlantic Division with a 50–32 win–loss record, qualifying for the 1981 NBA Playoffs. New York lost in the best-of-three first round to the Chicago Bulls in a two-game sweep.

== NBA draft ==
Note: This is not an extensive list; it only covers the first and second rounds, and any other players picked by the franchise that played at least one game in the league.

| Round | Pick | Player | Position | Nationality | School/Club team |
|---|---|---|---|---|---|
| 1 | 12 | Mike Woodson | G/F | United States | Indiana |
| 2 | 36 | DeWayne Scales | F | United States | LSU |
| 3 | 58 | Kurt Rambis | F | United States | Santa Clara |

== Roster ==
1980–81 New York Knicks roster
Players

| Pos. | No. | Player | Height | Weight | DOB | From |
|---|---|---|---|---|---|---|
| SG | 35 | Reggie Carter | 6 ft 3 in (1.91 m) | 175 lb (79 kg) | 1957-10-10 | St. John's |
| C | 25 | Bill Cartwright | 7 ft 1 in (2.16 m) | 245 lb (111 kg) | 1957-07-30 | San Francisco |
| PF | 42 | Larry Demic | 6 ft 9 in (2.06 m) | 225 lb (102 kg) | 1957-06-27 | Arizona |
| PG | 34 | Mike Glenn | 6 ft 2 in (1.88 m) | 175 lb (79 kg) | 1955-09-10 | Southern Illinois |
| SF | 43 | Toby Knight (IN) | 6 ft 9 in (2.06 m) | 210 lb (95 kg) | 1955-05-03 | Notre Dame |
| SG | 20 | Micheal Ray Richardson | 6 ft 5 in (1.96 m) | 189 lb (86 kg) | 1955-04-11 | Montana |
| SF | 21 | Campy Russell | 6 ft 8 in (2.03 m) | 215 lb (98 kg) | 1952-01-12 | Michigan |
| PF | 31 | DeWayne Scales | 6 ft 8 in (2.03 m) | 208 lb (94 kg) | 1958-12-28 | LSU |
| C | 40 | Marvin Webster | 7 ft 1 in (2.16 m) | 225 lb (102 kg) | 1952-04-13 | Morgan State |
| PG | 13 | Ray Williams | 6 ft 3 in (1.91 m) | 188 lb (85 kg) | 1954-10-14 | Minnesota |
| PF | 33 | Sly Williams | 6 ft 7 in (2.01 m) | 210 lb (95 kg) | 1958-01-26 | Rhode Island |
| SG | 44 | Mike Woodson | 6 ft 5 in (1.96 m) | 195 lb (88 kg) | 1958-03-24 | Indiana |

Coaches
Head coach
- Red Holzman
Assistant(s)
- Butch Beard
- Hal Fischer

Legend
- (DP) Unsigned draft pick
- (FA) Free agent
- (S) Suspended
- Injured

Roster
Updated: January 30, 1981

== Regular season ==
=== Season standings ===
| Atlantic Division | W | L | PCT | GB | Home | Road | Div |
|---|---|---|---|---|---|---|---|
| y-Boston Celtics | 62 | 20 | .756 | – | 35–6 | 27–14 | 19–5 |
| x-Philadelphia 76ers | 62 | 20 | .756 | – | 37–4 | 25–16 | 15–9 |
| x-New York Knicks | 50 | 32 | .610 | 12.0 | 28–13 | 22–19 | 14–10 |
| Washington Bullets | 39 | 43 | .476 | 23.0 | 26–15 | 13–28 | 8–16 |
| New Jersey Nets | 24 | 58 | .293 | 38.0 | 16–25 | 8–33 | 8–16 |

| # | Eastern Conference | | | | |
| # | Team | W | L | PCT | GB |
|---|---|---|---|---|---|
| 1 | z-Boston Celtics | 62 | 20 | .756 | – |
| 2 | y-Milwaukee Bucks | 60 | 22 | .732 | 2 |
| 3 | x-Philadelphia 76ers | 62 | 20 | .756 | – |
| 4 | x-New York Knicks | 50 | 32 | .610 | 12 |
| 5 | x-Chicago Bulls | 45 | 37 | .549 | 17 |
| 6 | x-Indiana Pacers | 44 | 38 | .537 | 18 |
| 7 | Washington Bullets | 39 | 43 | .476 | 23 |
| 8 | Atlanta Hawks | 31 | 51 | .378 | 31 |
| 9 | Cleveland Cavaliers | 28 | 54 | .341 | 34 |
| 10 | New Jersey Nets | 24 | 58 | .293 | 38 |
| 11 | Detroit Pistons | 21 | 61 | .256 | 41 |

Notes

- z, y – division champions
- x – clinched playoff spot

== Game log ==
=== Regular season ===
1980–81 game log
Total: 48–34 (home: 28–13; road: 20–21)
October: 6–2 (home: 5–0; road: 1–2)

| Game | Date | Team | Score | High points | High rebounds | High assists | Location Attendance | Record |
|---|---|---|---|---|---|---|---|---|
| 2 | October 14 | Philadelphia | | | | | | |
| 5 | October 23 | @ Boston (at Hartford, CT) | W 109–107 (OT) | | | | Hartford Civic Center | 4–1 |

November : 9–6 (home: 5–2; road: 4–4)

| Game | Date | Team | Score | High points | High rebounds | High assists | Location Attendance | Record |
|---|---|---|---|---|---|---|---|---|
| 10 | November 5 | @ Kansas City | | | | | | |
| 14 | November 12 | @ Philadelphia | | | | | | |
| 17 | November 18 | Philadelphia | | | | | | |
| 20 | November 24 | Houston | W 113–110 (OT) | | | | Madison Square Garden | 13–7 |
| 22 | November 28 | @ Boston | L 106–120 | | | | Boston Garden | 14–8 |

December : 10–5 (home: 7–2; road: 3–3)

| Game | Date | Team | Score | High points | High rebounds | High assists | Location Attendance | Record |
|---|---|---|---|---|---|---|---|---|
| 25 | December 3 | @ Philadelphia | | | | | | |
| 36 | December 25 | Boston | L 108–117 | | | | Madison Square Garden | 23–13 |
| 37 | December 27 | Kansas City | | | | | | |

January : 6–9 (home: 2–4; road: 4–5)

| Game | Date | Team | Score | High points | High rebounds | High assists | Location Attendance | Record |
|---|---|---|---|---|---|---|---|---|
| 44 | January 13 | Boston | L 89–93 | | | | Madison Square Garden | 27–17 |
| 47 | January 17 | @ Houston | W 99–98 | | | | The Summit | 28–19 |

February : 9–4 (home: 4–2; road: 5–2)

| Game | Date | Team | Score | High points | High rebounds | High assists | Location Attendance | Record |

March : 8–8 (home: 5–3; road: 3–5)

| Game | Date | Team | Score | High points | High rebounds | High assists | Location Attendance | Record |
|---|---|---|---|---|---|---|---|---|
| 71 | March 8 | @ Boston | L 94–115 | | | | Boston Garden | 42–29 |
| 72 | March 11 | @ Philadelphia | | | | | | |
| 74 | March 15 | Philadelphia | | | | | | |
| 79 | March 24 | Boston | L 116–118 | | | | Madison Square Garden | 48–31 |

1980–81 schedule

== Playoffs ==
1981 playoff game log
First Round: 0–2 (home: 0–1; road: 0–1)

| Game | Date | Team | Score | High points | High rebounds | High assists | Location Attendance | Series |
|---|---|---|---|---|---|---|---|---|
| 1 | March 31 | Chicago | L 80–90 | Ray Williams (19) | Micheal Ray Richardson (13) | Micheal Ray Richardson (6) | Madison Square Garden; 14,822 | 0–1 |
| 2 | April 3 | @ Chicago | W 114–115 (OT) | Campy Russell (29) | three players tied (6) | three players tied (5) | Chicago Stadium; 19,901 | 0–2 |

1981 schedule

== Awards and records ==
- Micheal Ray Richardson, NBA All-Defensive First Team
