= James Edwards (basketball) =

American basketball player, center

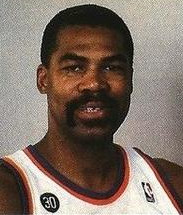
- Edwards in 1987

Personal information
- Born: November 22, 1955 (age 70) Seattle, Washington, U.S.
- Listed height: 7 ft 1 in (2.16 m)
- Listed weight: 252 lb (114 kg)

Career information
- High school: Roosevelt (Seattle, Washington)
- College: Washington (1973–1977)
- NBA draft: 1977: 3rd round, 46th overall pick
- Drafted by: Los Angeles Lakers
- Playing career: 1977–1996
- Position: Center
- Number: 42, 40, 53

Career history
- 1977: Los Angeles Lakers
- 1977–1981: Indiana Pacers
- 1981–1983: Cleveland Cavaliers
- 1983–1988: Phoenix Suns
- 1988–1991: Detroit Pistons
- 1991–1992: Los Angeles Clippers
- 1992–1994: Los Angeles Lakers
- 1994–1995: Portland Trail Blazers
- 1995–1996: Chicago Bulls

Career highlights
- 3× NBA champion (1989, 1990, 1996); 2× First-team All-Pac-8 (1976, 1977); AP Honorable mention All-American (1976)

Career NBA statistics
- Points: 14,862 (12.7 ppg)
- Rebounds: 6,004 (5.1 rpg)
- Blocks: 867 (0.7 bpg)
- Stats at NBA.com
- Stats at Basketball Reference

James Franklin Edwards (born November 22, 1955) is an American former professional basketball player who was a center in the National Basketball Association (NBA) for the Los Angeles Lakers, Indiana Pacers, Cleveland Cavaliers, Phoenix Suns, Detroit Pistons, Los Angeles Clippers, Portland Trail Blazers, and Chicago Bulls during a career that spanned 19 seasons. Though he never appeared in an All-Star Game, he was a reliable low-post scorer, averaging 12.7 points per game over his career. He played college basketball for the Washington Huskies.

== Early years ==
James Franklin Edwards was born on November 22, 1955, in Seattle, Washington. Edwards starred at Roosevelt High School. As a senior in 1973, he led the Roughriders to the big-school state basketball title, while receiving All-State and All-Metro honors at center.

He also practiced cross country running as a sophomore.

== College career ==
Edwards accepted a basketball scholarship from the hometown University of Washington, to play under coach Marv Harshman. As a freshman, he took over the starting duties at center, averaging 6.8 points and 4.6 rebounds per contest. As a sophomore, he registered 12.3 points and 7.5 rebounds per game.

As a junior in the 1975–76 season, he averaged 17.6 points (led the team) and 7.1 rebounds (second on the team) per game. He also contributed to the team having a 22–6 record, qualifying for the school's first NCAA basketball tournament appearance since 1953 and finishing the regular season ranked No. 11. This was also the last team to defeat (103–81) a John Wooden squad, as the legendary coach would retire after the season, having won his 10th National Championship.

As a senior in the 1976–1977 season, he led the team with 20.9 points and 10.4 rebounds, but the squad failed to qualify for the NCAA basketball tournament with a 17–10 overall record. He received All-American honors. He finished his college career with an average of 14.6 points and 7.5 rebounds per game.

In 1990, he was inducted into the University of Washington Husky Hall of Fame. In 2015, he was inducted into the State of Washington Sports Hall of Fame.

== Professional career ==
=== Los Angeles Lakers (1977) ===
Edwards was selected by the Los Angeles Lakers in the 3rd round (46th overall) of the 1977 NBA draft. As a rookie, he was forced to become the team's starting center just a few minutes into the season opener against the Milwaukee Bucks, when starter Kareem Abdul-Jabbar broke his right hand in a fight with rookie Kent Benson.

He led the team with averages of 17.1 points and 8.2 rebounds per game, until Abdul-Jabbar returned after missing the first 21 contests of the season. On December 13, the Lakers needed to find a replacement for suspended power forward Kermit Washington, so Edwards was traded along with shooting guard Earl Tatum and cash considerations to the Indiana Pacers, in exchange for small forward Adrian Dantley and center Dave Robisch.

=== Indiana Pacers (1977–1981) ===
Edwards enjoyed arguably his most productive years with the Indiana Pacers. He became the franchise's highest-scoring center, averaging 15.9 points over four seasons and also posted 7.5 rebounds per contest. The Pacers reached the playoffs for the first time in the 1980–81, under head coach Jack McKinney, and were swept 0–2 by the Philadelphia 76ers in the first round.

=== Cleveland Cavaliers (1981–1983) ===
On May 26, 1981, he was signed as a veteran free agent by the Cleveland Cavaliers, with the Pacers receiving a 1981 second-round draft pick (#36-Ray Blume) and a 1982 second round draft choice (#40-Guy Morgan) as compensation.

He spent parts of two seasons, averaging 16.0 points and 7.4 rebounds per game. On February 7, 1983, Cavaliers owner Ted Stepien desperately needed money to pay the team's payroll, so Edwards was traded along with a 1983 1st-round draft pick (#21-Greg Kite) to the Phoenix Suns in exchange for power forward Jeff Cook, a 1983 1st-round draft pick (#20-Roy Hinson), a 1983 3rd round draft choice (#67-Derrick Hord) and $425,000 in cash.

=== Phoenix Suns (1983–1988) ===
Edwards was a key contributor with the Phoenix Suns, averaging 14.7 points and 5.6 rebounds per game. On February 24, 1988, he was traded to the Detroit Pistons in exchange for center Ron Moore and a 1991 second-round draft pick (#46-Richard Dumas).

=== Detroit Pistons (1988–1991) ===
Edwards played four seasons with the Detroit Pistons. He was a key reserve of the consecutive champion in 1989 and 1990 Detroit Pistons' Bad Boys squads, starting most of the team's games in 1990. On June 7 of that year, during Game 2 of the 1990 NBA Finals, Edwards scored a team-leading 26 points during a 105–106 loss to Portland. The Pistons would go on to win the series in five games.

He averaged 11.2 points and 3.6 rebounds as a Piston. His horseshoe moustache and stoic demeanor, inspired his nickname of Buddha.

=== Los Angeles Clippers (1991–1992) ===
On August 13, 1991, he was traded to the Los Angeles Clippers in exchange for shooting guard Jeff Martin and a 1995 2nd-round draft pick (#30-Lou Roe). Edwards spent one season with the Clippers.

=== Los Angeles Lakers (1992–1994) ===
On August 13, 1992, he signed as an unrestricted free agent with the Los Angeles Lakers, spending two extra seasons with the team that originally drafted him.

=== Portland Trail Blazers (1994–1995) ===
On September 19, 1994, he signed as an unrestricted free agent with the Portland Trail Blazers. He was released on September 29, 1995.

=== Chicago Bulls (1995–1996) ===
On October 26, 1995, he signed as a free agent with the Chicago Bulls, where he won a third championship in the 19th and final season of his career in 1996, seeing limited playing time off the bench.

Edwards retired after playing 19 years at the center and power forward positions, with 14,862 career points and 6,004 career rebounds.

== NBA career statistics ==
Legend
GP	Games played	GS	Games started	MPG	Minutes per game
FG%	Field goal percentage	3P%	3-point field goal percentage	FT%	Free throw percentage
RPG	Rebounds per game	APG	Assists per game	SPG	Steals per game
BPG	Blocks per game	PPG	Points per game	**Bold**	Career high
†	Won an NBA championship

=== Regular season ===
Year	Team	GP	GS	MPG	FG%	3P%	FT%	RPG	APG	SPG	BPG	PPG
1977–78	L.A. Lakers	25	–	28.9	.459	–	.640	7.2	1.2	0.6	1.1	14.8
1977–78	Indiana	58	–	29.0	.450	–	.649	7.5	1.0	0.6	0.9	15.4
1978–79	Indiana	82	–	31.0	.501	–	.676	**8.5**	1.1	**0.7**	1.3	**16.7**
1979–80	Indiana	82	–	28.2	.512	.000	.681	7.0	1.5	**0.7**	1.3	15.7
1980–81	Indiana	81	–	29.3	.509	.000	.703	7.0	**2.6**	0.4	**1.6**	15.6
1981–82	Cleveland	77	75	**33.0**	.511	.000	.684	7.5	1.6	0.3	1.5	**16.7**
1982–83	Cleveland	15	8	25.5	.487	–	.623	6.4	0.9	0.5	0.9	12.3
1982–83	Phoenix	16	1	17.8	.487	–	.660	3.7	1.7	0.3	0.3	8.8
1983–84	Phoenix	72	67	26.3	.536	.000	.720	4.8	**2.6**	0.3	0.4	14.7
1984–85	Phoenix	70	58	25.5	.501	.000	.746	5.5	2.2	0.4	0.7	14.9
1985–86	Phoenix	52	51	25.3	**.542**	–	.702	5.8	1.4	0.4	0.6	16.3
1986–87	Phoenix	14	9	21.7	.518	–	**.771**	4.3	1.4	0.4	0.5	12.0
1987–88	Phoenix	43	42	32.0	.469	.000	.635	7.8	1.7	0.3	0.7	15.7
1987–88	Detroit	26	2	12.6	.475	–	.738	3.0	0.2	0.1	0.2	5.4
1988–89†	Detroit	76	1	16.5	.500	.000	.686	3.0	0.6	0.1	0.4	7.3
1989–90†	Detroit	82	70	27.8	.498	.000	.749	4.2	0.8	0.3	0.5	14.5
1990–91	Detroit	72	70	26.4	.484	**.500**	.729	3.8	0.9	0.2	0.4	13.6
1991–92	L.A. Clippers	72	11	20.0	.465	.000	.731	2.8	0.7	0.3	0.5	9.7
1992–93	L.A. Lakers	52	0	11.9	.452	–	.712	1.9	0.8	0.2	0.1	6.3
1993–94	L.A. Lakers	45	2	10.4	.464	–	.684	1.4	0.5	0.1	0.1	4.7
1994–95	Portland	28	0	9.5	.386	–	.647	1.5	0.3	0.2	0.3	2.7
1995–96†	Chicago	28	0	9.8	.373	–	.615	1.4	0.4	0.0	0.3	3.5
Career		1,168	467	24.3	.495	.048	.698	5.1	1.3	0.4	0.7	12.7

=== Playoffs ===
Year	Team	GP	GS	MPG	FG%	3P%	FT%	RPG	APG	SPG	BPG	PPG
1981	Indiana	2	–	**28.0**	.292	–	–	**7.0**	**2.5**	**0.5**	0.5	7.0
1983	Phoenix	3	–	18.0	.423	–	**1.000**	6.0	1.3	0.3	0.3	9.3
1984	Phoenix	17	–	27.2	.492	–	.706	5.4	1.6	0.2	**0.6**	13.8
1988	Detroit	**22**	2	14.0	.509	.000	.659	3.1	0.5	0.1	0.5	6.3
1989†	Detroit	17	0	18.6	.471	.000	.784	2.1	0.7	0.1	0.5	7.1
1990†	Detroit	20	**20**	26.8	.494	.000	.604	3.6	0.7	0.3	**0.6**	**14.3**
1991	Detroit	15	11	23.0	.407	–	.691	2.5	0.6	0.1	0.2	10.7
1992	L.A. Clippers	5	0	17.4	.417	–	.632	2.6	0.6	0.2	0.2	6.4
1993	L.A. Lakers	3	0	4.7	**.750**	–	–	0.7	0.0	0.0	0.0	2.0
1995	Portland	1	0	4.0	.000	–	–	0.0	0.0	0.0	0.0	0.0
1996†	Chicago	6	0	4.7	.444	–	.750	0.7	0.0	0.0	0.0	1.8
Career		111	33	19.9	.468	.000	.682	3.2	0.8	0.2	0.4	9.3

== Personal life ==
In April 1987, Edwards, along with Jay Humphries and Grant Gondrezick, was indicted by a Maricopa County, Arizona, grand jury investigating cocaine trafficking. Edwards was indicted on three counts, conspiracy to possess a narcotic drug, conspiracy to transfer a narcotic drug, and conspiracy to transfer or possess marijuana. Former Suns player Walter Davis was involved and was offered immunity in exchange for testimony, but his testimony failed to reveal critical details. Edwards, along with all other defendants, never went to trial, but was required to undergo a drug counseling program as settlement.

== See also ==
- List of NBA career personal fouls leaders
- List of NBA seasons played leaders
- List of oldest and youngest NBA players
