= 1980–81 Indiana Pacers season =

NBA professional basketball team season

- Head coach: Jack McKinney
- Arena: Market Square Arena

Results
- Record: 44–38 (.537)
- Place: Division: 3rd (Central); Conference: 6th (Eastern)
- Playoff finish: Lost to Philadelphia 76ers in East First Round (0-2)
- Stats at Basketball Reference

Local media
- Television: WTTV–TV 4 (Bob Lamey)
- Radio: WIBC–AM 1070 (Bob Lamey)

The 1980–81 Indiana Pacers season was Indiana's fifth season in the NBA and their 14th season as a franchise. The Pacers had their first NBA winning season and made their first NBA playoff appearance, which was quickly scuttled by a 2–0 sweep from the Philadelphia 76ers. The Pacers wouldn't return to the playoffs again until 1987.

Jack McKinney was named NBA Coach of the Year for leading the Pacers to the playoffs. McKinney began the previous season as coach of the Los Angeles Lakers, but suffered a near-fatal bicycling accident in November 1979 after only 13 games. The Lakers went on to win the championship under Paul Westhead, and McKinney was forced to step aside by Lakers owner Jerry Buss, who helped him land the Indiana job.

== Offseason ==
=== NBA draft ===
Round	Pick	Player	Position	Nationality	School/Club team

== Roster ==
1980–81 Indiana Pacers roster
Players

Pos.	No.	Player	Height	Weight	DOB	From
F	5	Tom Abernethy	6 ft 7 in (2.01 m)	220 lb (100 kg)	1954–05–6	Indiana
F	42	Mike Bantom	6 ft 9 in (2.06 m)	200 lb (91 kg)	1951–12–3	Saint Joseph's
G/F	7	Dudley Bradley	6 ft 6 in (1.98 m)	195 lb (88 kg)	1957–3–19	North Carolina
G	10	Don Buse	6 ft 4 in (1.93 m)	190 lb (86 kg)	1950–8–10	Evansville
G	16	Johnny Davis	6 ft 2 in (1.88 m)	170 lb (77 kg)	1955–10–21	Dayton
C	40	James Edwards	7 ft 0 in (2.13 m)	225 lb (102 kg)	1955–11–22	Washington
F/C	45	Clemon Johnson	6 ft 10 in (2.08 m)	240 lb (109 kg)	1956–09–12	Florida A&M
F	24	George Johnson	6 ft 7 in (2.01 m)	210 lb (95 kg)	1956–12–8	St. John's
G/F	25	Billy Knight	6 ft 6 in (1.98 m)	195 lb (88 kg)	1952–06–9	Pittsburgh
F	30	George McGinnis	6 ft 8 in (2.03 m)	235 lb (107 kg)	1950-08-12	Indiana
F	44	Dick Miller	6 ft 6 in (1.98 m)	215 lb (98 kg)	1958–04–26	Toledo
G	3	Kenny Natt	6 ft 3 in (1.91 m)	185 lb (84 kg)	1958–10–5	Louisiana–Monroe
F	55	Louis Orr	6 ft 8 in (2.03 m)	175 lb (79 kg)	1958–05–7	Syracuse
G	14	Jerry Sichting	6 ft 1 in (1.85 m)	168 lb (76 kg)	1956–11–29	Purdue

Coaches
Head coach
- Jack McKinney
Assistant(s)
- George Irvine

Legend
- (DP) Unsigned draft pick
- (FA) Free agent
- (S) Suspended
- Injured

Roster
Updated: 2012–10–10

== Regular season ==
Central Division	W	L	PCT	GB	Home	Road	Div
y-Milwaukee Bucks	60	22	.732	–	34–7	26–15	23–7
x-Chicago Bulls	45	37	.549	15.0	26–15	19–22	20–9
x-Indiana Pacers	44	38	.537	16.0	27–14	17–24	17–12
Atlanta Hawks	31	51	.378	29.0	20–21	11–30	9–21
Cleveland Cavaliers	28	54	.341	32.0	20–21	8–33	9–21
Detroit Pistons	21	61	.256	39.0	14–27	7–34	9–21

#	Eastern Conference				
#	Team	W	L	PCT	GB
1	z-Boston Celtics	62	20	.756	–
2	y-Milwaukee Bucks	60	22	.732	2
3	x-Philadelphia 76ers	62	20	.756	–
4	x-New York Knicks	50	32	.610	12
5	x-Chicago Bulls	45	37	.549	17
6	x-Indiana Pacers	44	38	.537	18
7	Washington Bullets	39	43	.476	23
8	Atlanta Hawks	31	51	.378	31
9	Cleveland Cavaliers	28	54	.341	34
10	New Jersey Nets	24	58	.293	38
11	Detroit Pistons	21	61	.256	41

Notes

- z, y – division champions
- x – clinched playoff spot

== Game log ==
=== Regular season ===
1980–81 game log
Total: 44–38 (Home: 27–14; Road: 17–24)
October: 7–3 (home: 4–2; road: 3–1)

Game	Date	Team	Score	High points	High rebounds	High assists	Location Attendance	Record
1	October 10	@ New Jersey	W 110–91				Rutgers Athletic Center	1–0
2	October 11	Detroit	W 100–87	Davis (22)	Edwards (16)	Davis (11)	Market Square Arena	2–0
3	October 15; 7:35 p.m. EST	Chicago	L 97–108				Market Square Arena; 6,909	2–1
4	October 18; 7:35 p.m. EST	Boston	W 103–99	Edwards (18)	McGinnis (11)	Bantom (6)	Market Square Arena; 11,713	3–1
5	October 21	@ Atlanta	W 121–116				The Omni	4–1
6	October 22; 7:35 p.m. EST	Milwaukee	L 105–119	Bantom (20)	G. Johnson (14)	Bantom (6)	Market Square Arena; 7,138	4–2
7	October 24	Atlanta	W 104–97				Market Square Arena	5–2
8	October 25	@ Cleveland	L 100–118				Richfield Coliseum	5–3
9	October 29	New York	W 102–95				Market Square Arena	6–3
10	October 31; 8:35 p.m. EST	@ Chicago	W 121–114	Knight (22)	C. Johnson (7)	Davis (10)	Chicago Stadium; 5,127	7–3

November: 7–8 (home: 5–2; road: 2–6)

Game	Date	Team	Score	High points	High rebounds	High assists	Location Attendance	Record
11	November 1	New Jersey	W 113–100				Market Square Arena	8–3
12	November 2; 8:30 p.m. EST	@ Milwaukee	L 121–135	Edwards (23)	Knight (7)	Bradley, Davis, Knight (5)	MECCA Arena; 10,980	8–4
13	November 4; 9:35 p.m. EST	@ Phoenix	L 108–109	Bantom (18)	Edwards, C. Johnson (9)	Bradley (5)	Arizona Veterans Memorial Coliseum; 12,018	8–5
14	November 8	@ Golden State	L 111–118				Oakland-Alameda County Coliseum Arena	8–6
15	November 10	@ Utah	L 106–108				Salt Palace Acord Arena	8–7
16	November 11; 8:30 p.m. EST	@ San Antonio	W 119–113	Knight (52)	Edwards (6)	Bradley (10)	HemisFair Arena; 11,282	9–7
17	November 13; 8:00 p.m. EST	Philadelphia	L 103–130	Orr (20)	G. Johnson (10)	Bradley (6)	Market Square Arena; 11,421	9–8
18	November 14	Washington	W 118–108				Market Square Arena	10–8
18	November 18	@ Detroit	W 102–97				Pontiac Silverdome	11–8
20	November 19; 7:35 p.m. EST	Boston	L 91–103	Knight (27)	G. Johnson, Knight (11)	Davis (7)	Market Square Arena; 10,815	11–9
21	November 21; 8:05 p.m. EST	@ Philadelphia	L 88–97	G. Johnson (19)	G. Johnson (16)	Davis (7)	The Spectrum; 8,237	11–10
22	November 22; 7:35 p.m. EST	Houston	W 129–120	Knight (22)	C. Johnson (11)	Davis (10)	Market Square Arena; 7,357	12–10
23	November 26	Atlanta	W 110–89				Market Square Arena	13–10
24	November 27	@ Washington	L 108–123				Capital Centre	13–11
25	November 29	Cleveland	W 117–101				Market Square Arena	14–11

December: 7–7 (home: 4–1; road: 3–6)

Game	Date	Team	Score	High points	High rebounds	High assists	Location Attendance	Record
26	December 2	@ New York	W 113–96				Madison Square Garden	15–11
27	December 3	Washington	W 128–115				Market Square Arena	16–11
28	December 5; 9:00 p.m. EST	@ Milwaukee	L 100–102	Bantom (25)	Bantom (12)	Bantom (8)	MECCA Arena; 11,052	16–12
29	December 6; 7:35 p.m. EST	Kansas City	W 107–88	Davis (20)	Edwards (10)	Davis (6)	Market Square Arena; 7,099	17–12
30	December 10; 7:35 p.m. EST	Phoenix	W 102–90	Edwards (17)	Edwards (10)	Davis (7)	Market Square Arena; 9,140	18–12
31	December 11	@ Cleveland	W 103–100				Richfield Coliseum	19–12
32	December 13	@ Washington	L 105–114				Capital Centre	19–13
33	December 16; 7:35 p.m. EST	Philadelphia	L 107–109	Knight (24)	McGinnia (16)	Davis (5)	Market Square Arena; 12,539	19–14
34	December 19	@ Detroit	L 106–109				Pontiac Silverdome	19–15
35	December 20; 8:35 p.m. EST	@ Kansas City	W 107–103	Davis (19)	McGinnis (15)	McGinnis (6)	Kemper Arena; 5,910	20–15
36	December 23	New Jersey	W 125–109				Market Square Arena	21–15
37	December 26	@ Los Angeles	L 115–116				The Forum	21–16
38	December 27	@ San Diego	L 109–121				San Diego Sports Arena	21–17
39	December 30	@ Denver	L 110–127				McNichols Sports Arena	21–18

January: 10–5 (home: 7–1; road: 3–4)

Game	Date	Team	Score	High points	High rebounds	High assists	Location Attendance	Record
40	January 2	@ Atlanta	W 109–106				The Omni	22–18
41	January 3	San Diego	W 128–104				Market Square Arena	23–18
42	January 4	@ New Jersey	W 113–104				Rutgers Athletic Center	24–18
43	January 7	New Jersey	W 112–103				Market Square Arena	25–18
44	January 8	@ New York	W 117–116 (OT)				Madison Square Garden	26–18
45	January 10; 7:35 p.m. EST	Milwaukee	W 106–102	Knight (21)	McGinnis (16)	Buse (6)	Market Square Arena; 14,505	27–18
46	January 14	Detroit	W 101–99				Market Square Arena	28–18
47	January 16	Seattle	L 94–95				Market Square Arena	28–19
48	January 18	Utah	W 110–89				Market Square Arena	29–19
49	January 20; 8:35 p.m. EST	@ Chicago	L 105–121	Bantom (25)	C Johnson (9)	Edwards (7)	Chicago Stadium; 5,519	29–20
50	January 21; 8:05 p.m. EST	@ Philadelphia	L 104–118	McGinnis (25)	Edwards (8)	Bradley, Davis, McGinnis (4)	The Spectrum; 9,752	29–21
51	January 23; 7:30 p.m. EST	@ Boston	L 103–104	Edwards (19)	McGinnis (9)	Bantom (5)	Boston Garden; 15,320	29–22
52	January 24	Dallas	W 107–89				Market Square Arena	30–22
53	January 27	@ Cleveland	L 109–114				Richfield Coliseum	30–23
54	January 28	Golden State	W 108–102				Market Square Arena	31–23

February: 6–7 (home: 3–4; road: 3–3)

Game	Date	Team	Score	High points	High rebounds	High assists	Location Attendance	Record
All-Star Break
55	February 3; 8:30 p.m. EST	@ Milwaukee	W 108–99	Knight (24)	Orr (11)	Bantom, Davis (9)	MECCA Arena; 11,052	32–23
56	February 4	Los Angeles	L 96–102				Market Square Arena	32–24
57	February 6; 7:30 p.m. EST	@ Boston	L 98–111	Bantom (24)	Orr (7)	McGinnis (7)	Boston Garden; 15,320	32–25
58	February 7	Cleveland	W 99–96				Market Square Arena	33–25
59	February 8	@ Detroit	W 124–101				Pontiac Silverdome	34–25
60	February 11; 7:35 p.m. EST	Milwaukee	L 101–107	Orr (21)	Orr (11)	Davis (7)	Market Square Arena; 11,817	34–26
61	February 13	@ New Jersey	L 100–103				Rutgers Athletic Center	34–27
62	February 15; 4:05 p.m. EST	Chicago	W 113–107	McGinnis (27)	Bantom (11)	Davis (6)	Market Square Arena; 10,513	35–27
63	February 18	Atlanta	L 96–99				Market Square Arena	35–28
64	February 20; 7:35 p.m. EST	San Antonio	W 109–106	McGinnis (24)	McGinnis (12)	Davis (8)	Market Square Arena; 10,419	36–28
65	February 22	Portland	L 109–113 (OT)				Market Square Arena	36–29
66	February 25; 9:00 p.m. EST	@ Houston	L 100–101	Edwards (25)	Edwards (11)	Davis (12)	The Summit; 13,121	36–30
67	February 27	@ Dallas	W 118–111				Reunion Arena	37–30

March: 7–8 (home: 4–4; road: 3–4)

Game	Date	Team	Score	High points	High rebounds	High assists	Location Attendance	Record
68	March 3	@ Portland	L 112–117				Memorial Coliseum	37–31
69	March 4	@ Seattle	L 93–105				Kingdome	37–32
70	March 6; 7:35 p.m. EST	Boston	W 110–104	Knight (32)	Bantom (6)	Davis (6)	Market Square Arena; 17,032	38–32
71	March 8	Denver	W 129–119				Market Square Arena	39–32
72	March 10; 7:35 p.m. EST	Philadelphia	L 102–103	Knight (22)	Edwards, Knight (8)	Davis (11)	Market Square Arena; 17,032	39–33
73	March 12	@ Washington	W 114–107				Capital Centre	40–33
74	March 13; 7:30 p.m. EST	@ Boston (at Hartford, CT)	W 101–94	Davis (24)	C. Johnson (17)	Davis (9)	Hartford Civic Center; 15,622	41–33
75	March 14	Detroit	L 94–101				Market Square Arena	41–34
76	March 17	@ New York	L 89–114				Madison Square Garden	41–35
77	March 18; 8:05 p.m. EST	@ Philadelphia	L 95–107	McGinnis (22)	Edwards, McGinnis (9)	Knight (4)	The Spectrum; 12,756	41–36
78	March 20	New York	L 107–110				Market Square Arena	41–37
79	March 22	Cleveland	W 107–101				Market Square Arena	42–37
80	March 26	@ Atlanta	W 115–107				The Omni	43–37
81	March 27	Washington	W 122–107				Market Square Arena	44–37
82	March 29; 1:05 p.m. EST	Chicago	L 97–101	Knight (25)	Edwards (9)	Davis (12)	Market Square Arena; 16,663	44–38

1980–81 schedule

=== Playoffs ===
1981 playoff game log
Eastern Conference First Round: 0–2 (home: 0–1; road: 0–1)

Game	Date	Team	Score	High points	High rebounds	High assists	Location Attendance	Series
1	March 31; 8:05 p.m. EST	@ Philadelphia	L 108–124	Knight (25)	C. Johnson, Knight (7)	Davis (8)	The Spectrum; 7,288	0–1
2	April 2; 8:05 p.m. EST	Philadelphia	L 85–96	Davis (21)	C. Johnson (13)	Knight (4)	Market Square Arena; 8,921	0–2

1981 schedule

== Player statistics ==
=== Ragular season ===
Player	POS	GP	GS	MP	REB	AST	STL	BLK	PTS	MPG	RPG	APG	SPG	BPG	PPG
Billy Knight	SG	82		2,385	410	157	84	12	1,436	29.1	5.0	1.9	1.0	.1	17.5
Dudley Bradley	SG	82		1,867	193	188	186	37	657	22.8	2.4	2.3	2.3	.5	8.0
Louis Orr	SF	82		1,787	361	132	55	25	859	21.8	4.4	1.6	.7	.3	10.5
James Edwards	C	81		2,375	571	212	32	128	1,266	29.3	7.0	2.6	.4	1.6	15.6
Clemon Johnson	C	81		1,643	468	144	44	119	582	20.3	5.8	1.8	.5	1.5	7.2
Johnny Davis	PG	76		2,536	170	480	95	14	1,094	33.4	2.2	6.3	1.3	.2	14.4
Mike Bantom	SF	76		2,375	427	240	80	85	1,061	31.3	5.6	3.2	1.1	1.1	14.0
George McGinnis	PF	69		1,845	528	210	99	28	903	26.7	7.7	3.0	1.4	.4	13.1
Don Buse	SG	58		1,095	84	140	74	8	297	18.9	1.4	2.4	1.3	.1	5.1
Jerry Sichting	PG	47		450	43	70	23	1	93	9.6	.9	1.5	.5	.0	2.0
George L. Johnson	PF	43		930	278	86	47	23	457	21.6	6.5	2.0	1.1	.5	10.6
Tom Abernethy^{†}	SF	29		259	40	18	6	3	59	8.9	1.4	.6	.2	.1	2.0
Kenny Natt	SG	19		149	15	10	5	1	59	7.8	.8	.5	.3	.1	3.1
Dick Miller^{†}	SF	5		34	4	4	3	0	4	6.8	.8	.8	.6	.0	.8

- ^{†} Denotes player spent time with another team in the season. Stats reflect time with the Pacers only.

=== Playoffs ===
Player	POS	GP	GS	MP	REB	AST	STL	BLK	PTS	MPG	RPG	APG	SPG	BPG	PPG
Johnny Davis	PG	2		74	8	11	2	0	40	37.0	4.0	5.5	1.0	.0	20.0
Billy Knight	SG	2		71	12	5	1	0	37	35.5	6.0	2.5	.5	.0	18.5
Louis Orr	SF	2		56	10	4	5	1	24	28.0	5.0	2.0	2.5	.5	12.0
James Edwards	C	2		56	14	5	1	1	14	28.0	7.0	2.5	.5	.5	7.0
Clemon Johnson	C	2		55	20	3	4	2	15	27.5	10.0	1.5	2.0	1.0	7.5
Mike Bantom	SF	2		51	8	1	1	1	29	25.5	4.0	.5	.5	.5	14.5
George McGinnis	PF	2		39	10	7	2	0	10	19.5	5.0	3.5	1.0	.0	5.0
Don Buse	SG	2		35	5	7	3	0	5	17.5	2.5	3.5	1.5	.0	2.5
George L. Johnson	PF	2		23	4	1	0	0	10	11.5	2.0	.5	.0	.0	5.0
Dudley Bradley	SG	2		19	2	2	2	0	9	9.5	1.0	1.0	1.0	.0	4.5
Jerry Sichting	PG	1		1	0	0	1	0	0	1.0	.0	.0	1.0	.0	.0

== Player totals ==
=== Season ===
Player	GP	GS	MP	FGM	FGA	3FGM	3FGA	FTM	FTA	ORB	DRB	TRB	AST	STL	BLK	TOV	PF	PTS
Knight	82		2385	546	1025	3	19	341	410	191	219	410	157	84	12	177	155	1436
Edwards	81		2375	511	1004	0	3	244	347	191	380	571	212	32	128	164	304	1266
Davis	76		2536	426	917	4	33	238	299	56	114	170	480	95	14	167	179	1094
Bantom	76		2375	431	882	0	6	199	281	150	277	427	240	80	85	197	284	1061
McGinnis	69		1845	348	768	0	7	207	385	164	364	528	210	99	28	221	242	903
Johnson	43		930	182	394	0	5	93	122	99	179	278	86	47	23	85	120	457
Orr	82		1787	348	709	0	6	163	202	172	189	361	132	55	25	123	153	859
Abernethy	29		259	24	56	0	1	11	19	19	21	40	18	6	3	6	29	59
Natt	19		149	25	77	2	8	7	11	9	6	15	10	5	1	10	18	59
Miller	5		34	2	6	0	1	0	0	1	3	4	4	3	0	4	2	4

=== Playoffs ===
Player	GP	GS	MP	FGM	FGA	3FGM	3FGA	FTM	FTA	ORB	DRB	TRB	AST	STL	BLK	TOV	PF	PTS
Davis	2		74	14	35	0	1	12	13	2	6	8	11	2	0	1	6	40
Knight	2		71	16	30	0	0	5	8	6	6	12	5	1	0	5	5	37
Bantom	2		51	12	16	0	0	5	7	5	3	8	1	1	1	6	10	29
Orr	2		56	9	25	0	0	6	7	6	4	10	4	5	1	6	4	24
Edwards	2		56	7	24	0	0	0	0	4	10	14	5	1	1	4	8	14
Johnson	2		23	5	8	0	0	0	0	1	3	4	1	0	0	2	1	10
McGinnis	2		39	3	15	0	0	4	8	2	8	10	7	2	0	5	6	10

== Awards and records ==
- Jack McKinney, NBA Coach of the Year Award
- Dudley Bradley, NBA All-Defensive Second Team

== Transactions ==
=== Trades ===
September 11, 1980
To Indiana Pacers----
- George L. Johnson
To Milwaukee Bucks----
- Mickey Johnson

=== Free agents ===
Subtractions
Player	Date signed	New team
Joe Hassett	Expansion Draft May 28, 1980	Dallas Mavericks
