= 1980–81 Milwaukee Bucks season =

NBA professional basketball team season

- Division champions
- Head coach: Don Nelson
- General manager: Don Nelson
- Owner: Jim Fitzgerald
- Arena: MECCA Arena

Results
- Record: 60–22 (.732)
- Place: Division: 1st (Central); Conference: 2nd (Eastern)
- Playoff finish: Conference semifinals (lost to 76ers 3–4)
- Stats at Basketball Reference

Local media
- Television: WVTV
- Radio: WTMJ

The 1980–81 Milwaukee Bucks season was the Bucks 13th season in the NBA. They finished with 60 wins and 22 losses, placing first in their division and second in the Eastern Conference behind the Boston Celtics. It was the Bucks' best regular season record since 1972–73, and their only 60-win season without Kareem Abdul-Jabbar on their roster until the 2018-19 season. The team's top scorer, fourth-year small forward Marques Johnson finished sixth in the MVP voting.

== Draft picks ==
Round	Pick	Player	Position	Nationality	School/Club team
3	63	Al Beal		United States	Oklahoma
4	86	Jeff Wolf		United States	North Carolina
5	109	Ken Jones		United States	Virginia Commonwealth
6	132	Alex Gilbert		United States	Indiana State
7	155	Ron White		United States	Furman
8	174	Keith Valentine		United States	Virginia Union
9	194	Del Yarbrough		United States	Illinois State
10	210	Melvin Crayton		United States	Alabama State

== Roster ==
1980–81 Milwaukee Bucks roster
Players

Pos.	No.	Player	Height	Weight	DOB	From
SF	2	Junior Bridgeman	6 ft 5 in (1.96 m)	210 lb (95 kg)	1953–09–17	Louisville
PG	21	Quinn Buckner	6 ft 3 in (1.91 m)	190 lb (86 kg)	1954–08–20	Indiana
PF	42	Harvey Catchings	6 ft 9 in (2.06 m)	218 lb (99 kg)	1951–09–02	Hardin–Simmons
PF	6	Pat Cummings	6 ft 9 in (2.06 m)	230 lb (104 kg)	1956–07–11	Cincinnati
C	41	Len Elmore	6 ft 9 in (2.06 m)	220 lb (100 kg)	1952–03–28	Maryland
PG	5	Mike Evans	6 ft 1 in (1.85 m)	170 lb (77 kg)	1955–04–19	Kansas State
C	35	Kim Hughes	6 ft 11 in (2.11 m)	220 lb (100 kg)	1952–06–04	Wisconsin
SF	8	Marques Johnson	6 ft 7 in (2.01 m)	218 lb (99 kg)	1956–02–08	UCLA
PF	43	Mickey Johnson	6 ft 10 in (2.08 m)	190 lb (86 kg)	1952–08–31	Aurora
C	16	Bob Lanier	6 ft 11 in (2.11 m)	250 lb (113 kg)	1948–09–10	St. Bonaventure
PG	4	Sidney Moncrief	6 ft 3 in (1.91 m)	180 lb (82 kg)	1957–09–21	Arkansas
SG	32	Brian Winters	6 ft 4 in (1.93 m)	185 lb (84 kg)	1952–03–01	South Carolina

Coaches
Head coach
- Don Nelson
Assistant(s)
- John Killilea
- Dave Wohl

Legend
- (DP) Unsigned draft pick
- (FA) Free agent
- (S) Suspended
- Injured

== Regular season ==
=== Season standings ===
Central Division	W	L	PCT	GB	Home	Road	Div
y-Milwaukee Bucks	60	22	.732	–	34–7	26–15	23–7
x-Chicago Bulls	45	37	.549	15.0	26–15	19–22	20–9
x-Indiana Pacers	44	38	.537	16.0	27–14	17–24	17–12
Atlanta Hawks	31	51	.378	29.0	20–21	11–30	9–21
Cleveland Cavaliers	28	54	.341	32.0	20–21	8–33	9–21
Detroit Pistons	21	61	.256	39.0	14–27	7–34	9–21

#	Eastern Conference				
#	Team	W	L	PCT	GB
1	z-Boston Celtics	62	20	.756	–
2	y-Milwaukee Bucks	60	22	.732	2
3	x-Philadelphia 76ers	62	20	.756	–
4	x-New York Knicks	50	32	.610	12
5	x-Chicago Bulls	45	37	.549	17
6	x-Indiana Pacers	44	38	.537	18
7	Washington Bullets	39	43	.476	23
8	Atlanta Hawks	31	51	.378	31
9	Cleveland Cavaliers	28	54	.341	34
10	New Jersey Nets	24	58	.293	38
11	Detroit Pistons	21	61	.256	41

Notes

- z, y – division champions
- x – clinched playoff spot

=== Game log ===
1980–81 game log
Total: 60–22 (home: 34–7; road: 26–15)
October: 9–2 (home: 4–1; road: 5–1)

Game	Date	Team	Score	High points	High rebounds	High assists	Location Attendance	Record
1	October 10, 1980	@ Philadelphia	W 106–103	Junior Bridgeman (21)			The Spectrum	1–0
2	October 11, 1980	@ New York	L 109–114	Marques Johnson (19)			Madison Square Garden	1-1
3	October 16, 1980	Boston	L 103–110	Marques Johnson (27)			MECCA Arena	1–2
4	October 18, 1980	@ Cleveland	W 107–105	Brian Winters (25)			Coliseum at Richfield	2-2
5	October 19, 1980	New Jersey	W 105–93	Brian Winters (22)			MECCA Arena	3–2
6	October 21, 1980	Cleveland	W 115–95	Marques Johnson (28)			MECCA Arena	4–2
7	October 22, 1980	@ Indiana	W 119–105				Market Square Arena	5–2
8	October 25, 1980	Chicago	W 109–93	Marques Johnson (21)			MECCA Arena	6–2
9	October 26, 1980	Washington	W 111–88	Marques Johnson (21)	Marques Johnson, Sidney Moncrief (9)	Quinn Buckner, Brian Winters (7)	MECCA Arena	7–2
10	October 28, 1980	@ Chicago	W 106–99				Chicago Stadium	8–2
11	October 29, 1980	@ New Jersey	W 132–116	Junior Bridgeman (26)			Rutgers Athletic Center	9–2

November: 9–3 (home: 2–3; road: 7–0)

Game	Date	Team	Score	High points	High rebounds	High assists	Location Attendance	Record
12	November 1, 1980	@ Atlanta	W 99–93				Omni Coliseum	10–2
13	November 2, 1980	Indiana	W 135–121	Marques Johnson (40)			MECCA Arena	11–2
14	November 4, 1980	Detroit	L 96–98				MECCA Arena	11–3
15	November 7, 1980	@ Boston	w 102–101				Boston Garden	12–3
16	November 9, 1980	Philadelphia	L 121–136				MECCA Arena	12–4
17	November 11, 1980	@ Cleveland	W 100–96	Marques Johnson (19)			Coliseum at Richfield	13–4
18	November 12, 1980	@ Detroit	W 122–98	Junior Bridgeman (27)			Pontiac Silverdome	14–4
19	November 14, 1980	New York	W 125–106				MECCA Arena	15–4
20	November 16, 1980	Chicago	L 108–114				MECCA Arena	15–5
21	November 18, 1980	@ Utah	W 126–93	Sidney Moncrief (21)			Salt Palace	16–5
22	November 20, 1980	@ Portland	W 97–93	Mickey Johnson (22)			Memorial Coliseum	17–5
23	November 23, 1980	@ Los Angeles	W 110–94	Marques Johnson (24)			The Forum	18–5
24	November 28, 1980	Atlanta	W 114–108 OT				MECCA Arena	19–5
25	November 29, 1980	@ Washington	L 89–98				Capital Centre	19–6
26	November 30, 1980	Boston	W 107–105				MECCA Arena	20–6

December: 8–5 (home: 7–0; road: 1–5)

Game	Date	Team	Score	High points	High rebounds	High assists	Location Attendance	Record
27	December 2, 1980	Utah	W 119–108				MECCA Arena	21–6
28	December 5, 1980	Indiana	W 102–100				MECCA Arena	22–6
29	December 6, 1980	@ New York	L 94–104				Madison Square Garden	22–7
30	December 9, 1980	@ Boston	L 89–112				Boston Garden	22–8
31	December 11, 1980	New York	W 119–107				MECCA Arena	23–8
32	December 13, 1980	@ Atlanta	L 119–122				Omni Coliseum	23–9
33	December 14, 1980	San Antonio	W 115–98				MECCA Arena	24–9
34	December 17, 1980	@ New Jersey	L 112–115				Rutgers Athletic Center	24–10
35	December 18, 1980	Detroit	W 121–104				MECCA Arena	25–10
36	December 19, 1980	@ Chicago	L 106–129				Chicago Stadium	25–11
37	December 21, 1980	Houston	W 123–91				MECCA Arena	26–11
38	December 27, 1980	Dallas	W 112–96				MECCA Arena	27–11
39	December 30, 1980	@ Washington	W 115–94				Capital Centre	28–11

January: 10–3 (home: 6–0; road: 4–3)

Game	Date	Team	Score	High points	High rebounds	High assists	Location Attendance	Record
40	January 4, 1981	San Diego	W 128–95				MECCA Arena	29–11
41	January 6, 1981	New Jersey	W 102–86				MECCA Arena	30–11
42	January 8, 1981	Atlanta	W 98–95				MECCA Arena	31–11
43	January 10, 1981	@ Indiana	L 102–106				Market Square Arena	31–12
44	January 11, 1981	Phoenix	W 123–109				MECCA Arena	32–12
45	January 13, 1981	@ Detroit	W 119–96				Pontiac Silverdome	33–12
46	January 15, 1981	Philadelphia	W 113–110				MECCA Arena	34–12
47	January 16, 1981	Kansas City	W 118–112 OT				MECCA Arena	35–12
48	January 18, 1981	Portland	W 110–103				MECCA Arena	36–12
49	January 21, 1981	@ Golden State	W 105–98				Oakland-Alameda County Coliseum Arena	37–12
50	January 23, 1981	@ Phoenix	L 122–131				Arizona Veterans Memorial Coliseum	37–13
51	January 24, 1981	@ San Diego	W 121–117				San Diego Sports Arena	38–13
52	January 28, 1981	@ Seattle	W 119–110				Kingdome	39–13
53	January 29, 1981	@ Denver	W 188–131				McNichols Sports Arena	39–14

February: 1–0 (home: 0–0; road: 1–0)

Game	Date	Team	Score	High points	High rebounds	High assists	Location Attendance	Record
62	February 17, 1981	@ Dallas	W 114–106				Reunion Arena	45–17

March: 0–0 (home: 0–0; road: 0–0)

Game	Date	Team	Score	High points	High rebounds	High assists	Location Attendance	Record

1980–81 schedule

== Playoffs ==
1981 playoff game log
Conference semifinals: 3–4 (home: 2–1; road: 1–3)

Game	Date	Team	Score	High points	High rebounds	High assists	Location Attendance	Series
1	April 5	@ Philadelphia	L 122–125	Junior Bridgeman (32)	Marques Johnson (14)	Quinn Buckner (8)	Spectrum; 9,727	0–1
2	April 7	@ Philadelphia	W 109–99	Marques Johnson (22)	Bob Lanier (10)	Quinn Buckner (6)	Spectrum; 15,259	1–1
3	April 10	Philadelphia	L 103–108	Marques Johnson (29)	Marques Johnson (9)	Marques Johnson (8)	MECCA Arena; 11,052	1–2
4	April 12	Philadelphia	W 109–98	Marques Johnson (35)	Sidney Moncrief (10)	Marques Johnson (7)	MECCA Arena; 11,052	2–2
5	April 15	@ Philadelphia	L 99–116	Mickey Johnson, Moncrief (20)	Mickey Johnson (13)	Marques Johnson (7)	Spectrum; 15,384	2–3
6	April 17	Philadelphia	W 109–86	Mickey Johnson (22)	Mickey Johnson (12)	Lanier, Buckner (6)	MECCA Arena; 11,052	3–3
7	April 19	@ Philadelphia	L 98–99	Marques Johnson (36)	Bob Lanier (10)	four players tied (4)	Spectrum; 6,704	3–4

1981 schedule

== Player statistics ==
Legend
GP	Games played	GS	Games started	MPG	Minutes per game
FG%	Field-goal percentage	3P%	3-point field-goal percentage	FT%	Free-throw percentage
RPG	Rebounds per game	APG	Assists per game	SPG	Steals per game
BPG	Blocks per game	PPG	Points per game

=== Season ===
Season
Player	GP	GS	MPG	FG%	3FG%	FT%	RPG	APG	SPG	BPG	PPG
Marques Johnson	76		33.4	55.2	0.0	70.6	6.8	4.6	1.5	0.5	20.3
Junior Bridgeman	77		28.8	48.7	14.3	88.4	3.8	3.0	1.1	0.4	16.8
Bob Lanier	67		26.2	52.5	100.0	75.1	6.2	2.7	1.1	1.2	14.3
Sidney Moncrief	80		30.2	54.1	22.2	80.4	5.1	3.3	1.1	0.5	14.0
Quinn Buckner	82		29.1	49.3	16.7	73.4	3.6	4.7	2.4	0.0	13.3
Mickey Johnson	82		25.8	44.8	16.7	78.9	6.6	3.5	1.1	0.9	12.5
Brian Winters	69		25.7	47.5	35.3	86.9	2.0	3.3	1.0	0.1	11.6
Pat Cummings	74		14.6	53.9	0.0	70.7	3.9	0.8	0.4	0.3	8.0
Mike Evans	71		12.8	46.0	14.3	78.1	1.2	2.4	0.5	0.1	4.5
Harvey Catchings	77		21.2	44.7	0.0	64.1	6.1	1.3	0.4	2.4	4.2
Len Elmore	72		12.8	35.8	0.0	72.0	2.9	1.0	0.5	0.7	2.9
Kim Hughes	45		7.4	35.6	0.0	0.0	1.7	0.5	0.4	0.5	0.7

=== Playoffs ===
Playoffs
Player	GP	GS	MPG	FG%	3FG%	FT%	RPG	APG	SPG	BPG	PPG
Marques Johnson	7	7	38.0	55.6	0.0	71.9	9.4	4.9	1.4	1.0	24.7
Bob Lanier	7	7	33.7	58.8	0.0	71.9	7.4	4.0	1.7	1.1	17.6
Sidney Moncrief	7	7	39.6	43.5	0.0	74.5	6.7	2.9	1.7	0.4	14.0
Junior Bridgeman	7	0	26.1	46.2	100.0	81.3	2.1	3.3	0.9	0.0	14.0
Mickey Johnson	7	7	24.3	40.0	0.0	85.7	6.7	1.9	1.3	0.9	11.7
Brian Winters	7	0	25.9	45.9	33.3	75.0	3.3	3.1	1.4	0.1	10.0
Quinn Buckner	7	7	26.1	43.3	0.0	68.8	2.9	5.0	1.6	0.0	9.0
Mike Evans	4	0	9.5	52.9	0.0	87.5	0.3	1.5	0.0	0.3	6.3
Pat Cummings	5	0	5.0	27.3	0.0	75.0	1.2	0.0	0.2	0.0	1.8
Harvey Catchings	7	0	15.6	18.8	0.0	100.0	3.7	1.1	0.0	1.6	1.1
Len Elmore	4	0	3.0	0.0	0.0	0.0	0.0	0.0	0.0	0.0	0.0

== Awards, records and milestones ==
=== Awards ===
==== Season ====
- Marques Johnson, All-NBA Second Team
- Quinn Buckner, NBA All-Defensive Second Team

== Transactions ==
=== Trades ===
September 11, 1980
To Milwaukee Bucks----
- Mickey Johnson
To Indiana Pacers----
- George L. Johnson

=== Free agents ===
Player	Signed	Former team
Kim Hughes	October 31, 1980	Denver Nuggets

Subtractions
Player	Date signed	New team
Dave Meyers	April 30, 1980	Retired
Richard Washington	Expansion Draft May 28, 1980	Dallas Mavericks
Lloyd Walton	October 6, 1980	Kansas City Kings
Scott Lloyd	October 20, 1980	Dallas Mavericks

== See also ==
- 1980-81 NBA season
