= Mickey Johnson =

American basketball player and coach (born 1952)

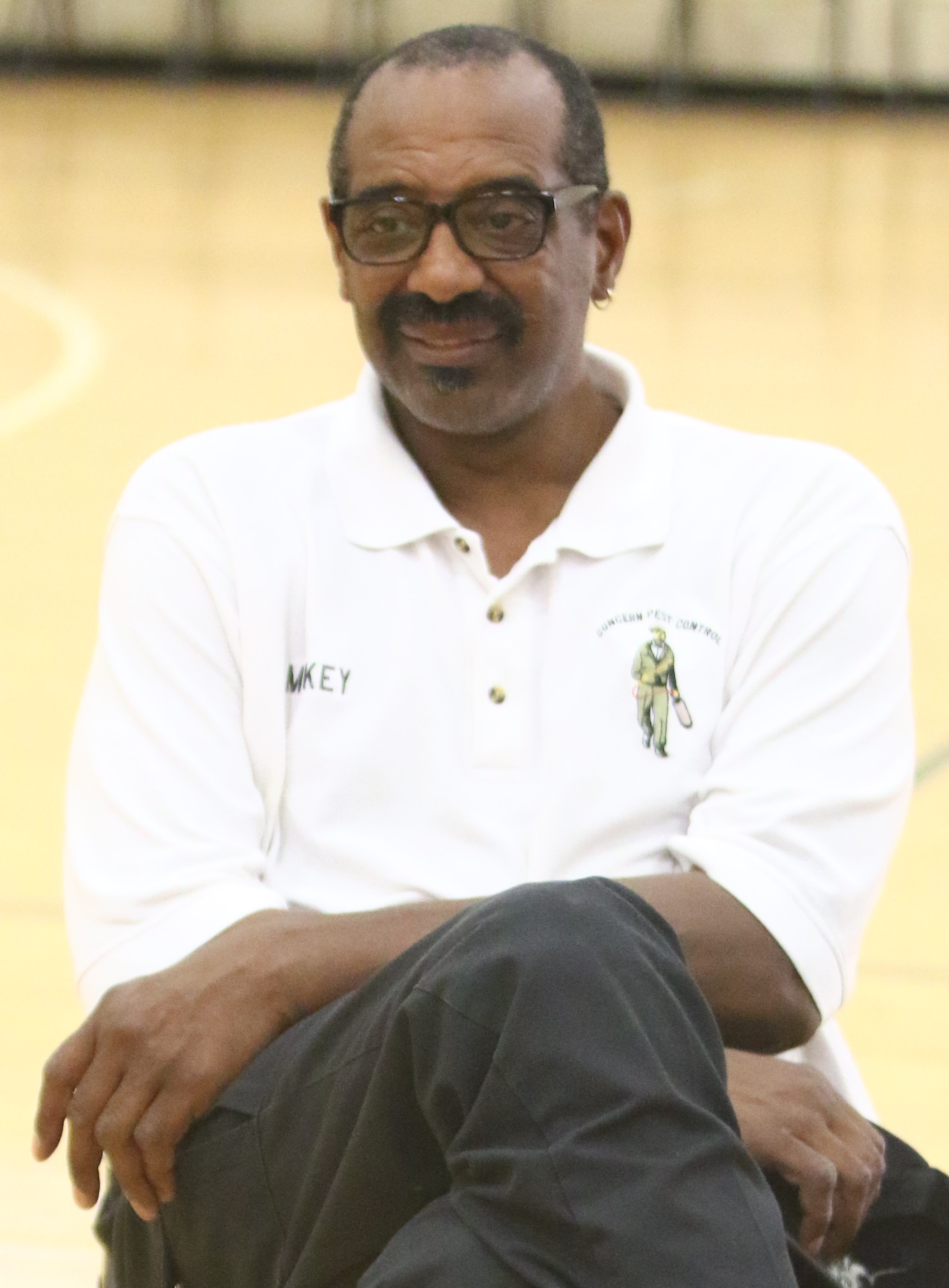
- Johnson at a Summer 2015 youth clinic

Personal information
- Born: August 31, 1952 (age 74) Chicago, Illinois, U.S.
- Listed height: 6 ft 10 in (2.08 m)
- Listed weight: 190 lb (86 kg)

Career information
- High school: Lindblom Technical (Chicago, Illinois)
- College: Aurora (1970–1974)
- NBA draft: 1974: 4th round, 56th overall pick
- Drafted by: Portland Trail Blazers
- Playing career: 1974–1986
- Position: Power forward
- Number: 8, 3

Career history
- 1974–1979: Chicago Bulls
- 1979–1980: Indiana Pacers
- 1980–1982: Milwaukee Bucks
- 1982–1983: New Jersey Nets
- 1983–1984: Golden State Warriors
- 1985–1986: New Jersey Nets

Career NBA statistics
- Points: 12,748 (14.1 ppg)
- Rebounds: 6,465 (7.2 rpg)
- Assists: 2,677 (3.0 apg)
- Stats at NBA.com
- Stats at Basketball Reference

Wallace Edgar "Mickey" Johnson (born August 31, 1952) is an American former professional basketball player in the National Basketball Association (NBA).

== Career ==
=== Basketball ===
After graduating from Chicago's Lindblom High School and playing collegiately at tiny Aurora College, the 6' 10" forward/center was selected by the Portland Trail Blazers in the fourth round of the 1974 NBA draft. The Blazers immediately traded Johnson to the Chicago Bulls, with whom he averaged just 3.8 points per game as a rookie. Johnson quickly improved, however, and he moved into the Bulls' starting lineup during the middle of his second season. A versatile scorer and aggressive rebounder, he averaged 17.3 points and 10.2 rebounds in 1976–77. On April 17, 1977, in the deciding game of a first round loss against the team which originally drafted him, Portland (Chicago was then a Western Conference team), Johnson scored a playoff career-high 34 points and added 14 rebounds. The following season, he averaged 18.3 points and 9.1 rebounds, and on February 26, 1978, he scored 30 points and grabbed 21 rebounds in a 100–99 loss, again to Portland.

In 1979, he signed as a free agent with the Indiana Pacers, averaging a career-high 19.1 points during his first and only season with that club. In what was arguably the best game of his career, on January 30, 1980, Johnson scored 41 points, grabbed 7 rebounds, and recorded 8 assists in a 119–120 loss against the Washington Bullets. Just a couple weeks later, on February 14 during a 118–114 win over the Cleveland Cavaliers, Johnson set a career high with 6 blocks in a single game, while also adding 14 points, 7 rebounds, and 7 assists. On September 11, 1980, Johnson was traded by the Pacers to the Milwaukee Bucks for George L. Johnson and a 1982 2nd-round draft pick (Jose Slaughter was later selected). After finishing the season with a record of 60–22, the Bucks would face the Philadelphia 76ers during the 1981 NBA Playoffs, where Johnson led Milwaukee to a Game 6 win with 22 points, 12 rebounds, and 3 steals. In Game 7, the Bucks lost 99–98, and the conclusion of the game was delayed for two hours and sixteen minutes as coach Don Nelson contested if Philadelphia got away with a 24-second violation as the game ended.

During the 1982 NBA Playoffs, on April 25, 1982, Johnson scored 28 points and recorded 4 steals in a Game 1 loss against the 76ers in the Eastern Conference Semifinals. The Bucks would eventually lose the series in six games, being eliminated by the 76ers for the second year in a row. On Johnson's underappreciated role in the Bucks' postseason run, Don Nelson said "Mickey has not been getting much credit, he's had a few games where his offense was not good, but his defense has always been there..." Despite being a solid starter on the Bucks, Johnson's tenure may be most remembered for the fact that both he and teammate Marques Johnson were the first two players in NBA history to have their full first and last names displayed on their jerseys, as they both shared the same first initial and last name.

He also played for the New Jersey Nets and Golden State Warriors during his career. On March 10, 1983, while on the Warriors, Johnson recorded a triple double with 21 points, 11 rebounds, and 10 assists in a 119–109 win over the Houston Rockets. He retired in 1986 with 12,748 career points and 6,465 career rebounds.

During his NBA career, Johnson was called "Rubberman" by teammates due his ability to stretch and grab rebounds and block shots, despite his slender frame.

He later became the head men's basketball coach at Malcolm X College in Chicago.

=== Politics ===
In 2015, Johnson unsuccessfully ran in an open race for alderman from Chicago's 24th Ward. He was a finalist for an appointment to fill a vacancy for the same office in 2022; Chicago mayor Lori Lightfoot ultimately nominated Monique Scott instead.

In 2017, Johnson described Colin Kaepernick as a "patriot" when discussing Kaepernick's use of controversial anthem protesting to bring attention to institutional racism in America.

== NBA career statistics ==
Legend
GP	Games played	GS	Games started	MPG	Minutes per game
FG%	Field goal percentage	3P%	3-point field goal percentage	FT%	Free throw percentage
RPG	Rebounds per game	APG	Assists per game	SPG	Steals per game
BPG	Blocks per game	PPG	Points per game	**Bold**	Career high
*	Led the league

=== Regular season ===
Year	Team	GP	GS	MPG	FG%	3P%	FT%	RPG	APG	SPG	BPG	PPG
1974–75	Chicago	38	–	7.7	.449	–	.638	2.5	0.5	0.3	0.3	3.8
1975–76	Chicago	81	–	29.5	.463	–	.786	9.4	1.6	1.1	0.8	15.3
1976–77	Chicago	81	–	35.1	.446	–	.796	**10.2**	2.4	1.3	0.8	17.3
1977–78	Chicago	81	–	**35.4**	.462	–	.812	9.1	3.3	1.1	0.8	18.3
1978–79	Chicago	**82***	–	31.6	.449	–	**.830**	7.6	**4.6**	1.1	0.7	15.4
1979–80	Indiana	**82**	–	32.3	.463	.156	.799	8.3	4.2	**1.9**	**1.4**	**19.1**
1980–81	Milwaukee	**82**	–	25.8	.448	.167	.789	6.6	3.5	1.1	0.9	12.5
1981–82	Milwaukee	76	**71**	25.4	**.491**	.143	.801	6.0	2.8	0.9	0.6	12.9
1982–83	Milwaukee	6	0	25.5	.455	.000	.778	4.2	1.8	0.2	0.3	11.2
1982–83	New Jersey	42	7	23.8	.401	.118	.816	5.3	3.4	1.3	0.5	13.4
1982–83	Golden State	30	9	30.0	.451	.059	.829	8.2	3.3	0.8	0.8	15.5
1983–84	Golden State	78	25	27.2	.421	.172	.785	6.6	2.8	1.3	0.4	13.6
1984–85	Golden State	66	9	23.7	.426	**.233**	.823	6.0	2.3	1.1	0.5	13.3
1985–86	New Jersey	79	4	19.9	.422	.208	.785	4.2	2.7	0.8	0.3	7.8
Career		904	125	27.7	.449	.165	.800	7.2	3.0	1.1	0.7	14.1

=== Playoffs ===
Year	Team	GP	GS	MPG	FG%	3P%	FT%	RPG	APG	SPG	BPG	PPG
1974–75	Chicago	3	–	1.7	.333	–	.000	0.0	0.0	0.0	0.3	0.7
1976–77	Chicago	3	–	**41.3**	.472	–	**.875**	**13.0**	2.3	**1.7**	0.7	**27.3**
1980–81	Milwaukee	**7**	–	24.3	.400	.000	.857	6.7	1.9	1.3	**0.9**	11.7
1981–82	Milwaukee	6	–	34.3	**.573**	.000	.846	5.3	**3.0**	1.3	0.7	19.8
1985–86	New Jersey	3	0	18.0	.263	.000	.636	3.7	0.7	0.7	0.0	5.7
Career		22	0	25.4	.466	.000	.832	5.9	1.8	1.1	0.6	13.7

== Family ==
Mickey Johnson is the uncle of journeyman former NBA forward Linton Johnson.
