= Johnny Davis (basketball, born 1955) =

American basketball player and coach

Personal information
- Born: October 21, 1955 (age 71) Detroit, Michigan, U.S.
- Listed height: 6 ft 2 in (1.88 m)
- Listed weight: 170 lb (77 kg)

Career information
- High school: Murray-Wright (Detroit, Michigan)
- College: Dayton (1973–1976)
- NBA draft: 1976: 2nd round, 22nd overall pick
- Drafted by: Portland Trail Blazers
- Playing career: 1976–1986
- Position: Point guard
- Number: 16
- Coaching career: 1990–2014

Career history

Playing
- 1976–1978: Portland Trail Blazers
- 1978–1982: Indiana Pacers
- 1982–1984: Atlanta Hawks
- 1984–1986: Cleveland Cavaliers
- 1986: Atlanta Hawks

Coaching
- 1990–1993: Atlanta Hawks (assistant)
- 1993–1994: Los Angeles Clippers (assistant)
- 1994–1996: Portland Trail Blazers (assistant)
- 1996–1997: Philadelphia 76ers
- 1997–1999: New Jersey Nets (assistant)
- 1999–2003: Orlando Magic (assistant)
- 2004–2005: Orlando Magic
- 2005–2006: Minnesota Timberwolves (assistant)
- 2006–2007: Indiana Pacers (assistant)
- 2007–2009: Memphis Grizzlies (assistant)
- 2009: Memphis Grizzlies
- 2009–2011: Memphis Grizzlies (assistant)
- 2011–2013: Toronto Raptors (assistant)
- 2013–2014: Los Angeles Lakers (assistant)

Career highlights
- NBA champion (1977)

Career statistics
- Points: 9,710 (12.9 ppg)
- Rebounds: 1,505 (2.0 rpg)
- Assists: 3,368 (4.5 apg)
- Stats at NBA.com
- Stats at Basketball Reference
Medals
Representing United States
Men's basketball
Pan American Games
| Gold medal – first place | 1975 Mexico City | Team competition |

Johnny Reginald Davis (born October 21, 1955) is an American former professional basketball player and coach in the National Basketball Association (NBA). He played in the NBA with four teams in ten years from 1976 to 1986, winning an NBA championship in his rookie season (1976–77) with the Portland Trail Blazers. He also played for the Indiana Pacers, the Atlanta Hawks, and the Cleveland Cavaliers.

In 1996–97 NBA season Davis coached the Philadelphia 76ers, and he coached the Orlando Magic for nearly two seasons from 2003 to 2005. On June 21, 2007, he was named assistant coach by new Grizzlies head coach Marc Iavaroni. Davis had previously served as an assistant coach with the Atlanta Hawks, Los Angeles Clippers, Portland Trail Blazers, New Jersey Nets, Orlando Magic, Minnesota Timberwolves, Indiana Pacers, Memphis Grizzlies, Toronto Raptors, and Los Angeles Lakers.

On January 22, 2009, Iavaroni was fired by Memphis GM Chris Wallace, and Davis was named interim head coach of the Grizzlies. On January 25, Lionel Hollins—Davis' teammate on the 1977 Portland team—was named Memphis' head coach, with Davis going back to his old job as an assistant coach. From 2011 to 2013, Davis worked as an assistant with the Toronto Raptors.

== Career playing statistics ==
Legend
| GP | Games played | GS | Games started | MPG | Minutes per game |
| FG% | Field goal percentage | 3P% | 3-point field goal percentage | FT% | Free throw percentage |
| RPG | Rebounds per game | APG | Assists per game | SPG | Steals per game |
| BPG | Blocks per game | PPG | Points per game | **Bold** | Career high |
| † | Won an NBA championship |

=== NBA ===
==== Regular season ====
| Year | Team | GP | GS | MPG | FG% | 3P% | FT% | RPG | APG | SPG | BPG | PPG |
|---|---|---|---|---|---|---|---|---|---|---|---|---|
| 1976–77† | Portland | 79 | | 18.4 | .441 | | .794 | 1.6 | 1.9 | .5 | .1 | 8.0 |
| 1977–78 | Portland | **82** | | 26.7 | .454 | | .828 | 2.1 | 2.6 | 1.0 | .2 | 10.7 |
| 1978–79 | Indiana | 79 | 79 | **37.6** | .456 | | .793 | 2.4 | 5.7 | 1.2 | **.3** | **18.3** |
| 1979–80 | Indiana | **82** | **82** | 35.5 | .428 | .095 | **.864** | **2.8** | 5.4 | **1.3** | **.3** | 15.9 |
| 1980–81 | Indiana | 76 | 73 | 33.4 | .456 | .121 | .796 | 2.2 | **6.3** | **1.3** | .2 | 14.4 |
| 1981–82 | Indiana | **82** | 70 | 32.5 | **.467** | .185 | .799 | 2.2 | 4.2 | .9 | .1 | 17.0 |
| 1982–83 | Atlanta | 53 | 33 | 27.6 | .455 | .278 | .796 | 2.4 | 5.9 | .8 | .1 | 12.9 |
| 1983–84 | Atlanta | 75 | 72 | 27.7 | .443 | .000 | .848 | 1.9 | 4.3 | .8 | .1 | 12.3 |
| 1984–85 | Cleveland | 76 | 30 | 25.3 | .426 | .261 | .850 | 1.6 | 5.6 | .6 | .1 | 12.4 |
| 1985–86 | Cleveland | 39 | 0 | 15.7 | .430 | .182 | .848 | .9 | 2.7 | .6 | .1 | 7.0 |
| 1985–86 | Atlanta | 27 | 7 | 14.9 | .430 | **.500** | **.864** | .7 | 4.1 | .5 | .0 | 5.3 |
| Career | | 750 | 446 | 28.3 | .448 | .176 | .821 | 2.0 | 4.5 | .9 | .2 | 12.9 |

==== Playoffs ====
| Year | Team | GP | GS | MPG | FG% | 3P% | FT% | RPG | APG | SPG | BPG | PPG |
|---|---|---|---|---|---|---|---|---|---|---|---|---|
| 1977† | Portland | **16** | | 27.3 | .489 | | .717 | 2.1 | 3.3 | **1.8** | .2 | 10.5 |
| 1978 | Portland | 6 | | 33.5 | .461 | | .696 | 1.7 | 2.2 | .2 | **.3** | 14.3 |
| 1981 | Indiana | 2 | | 37.0 | .400 | .000 | .923 | **4.0** | 5.5 | 1.0 | .0 | **20.0** |
| 1983 | Atlanta | 3 | | **37.7** | .404 | .000 | .900 | 1.7 | **9.0** | .0 | .0 | 17.0 |
| 1984 | Atlanta | 5 | | 26.2 | .400 | | **1.000** | 2.0 | 4.8 | .2 | .0 | 10.0 |
| 1985 | Cleveland | 3 | 0 | 16.7 | **.750** | .000 | .800 | 2.0 | 5.0 | 1.7 | .0 | 9.3 |
| 1986 | Atlanta | 8 | 0 | 8.1 | .360 | – | **1.000** | .8 | 1.9 | .3 | .0 | 2.8 |
| Career | | 43 | 0 | 24.9 | .454 | .000 | .781 | 1.8 | 3.7 | .9 | .1 | 10.3 |

== Head coaching record ==
Legend
| Regular season | G | Games coached | W | Games won | L | Games lost | W–L % | Win–loss % |
| Playoffs | PG | Playoff games | PW | Playoff wins | PL | Playoff losses | PW–L % | Playoff win–loss % |

| Team | Year | G | W | L | W–L% | Finish | PG | PW | PL | PW–L% | Result |
|---|---|---|---|---|---|---|---|---|---|---|---|
| Philadelphia | 1996–97 | 82 | 22 | 60 | .268 | 6th in Atlantic | — | — | — | — | Missed playoffs |
| Orlando | 2003–04 | 71 | 20 | 51 | .282 | 7th in Atlantic | — | — | — | — | Missed playoffs |
| Orlando | 2004–05 | 64 | 31 | 33 | .484 | (fired) | — | — | — | — | — |
| Memphis | 2008–09 | 2 | 0 | 2 | .000 | (interim) | — | — | — | — | — |
| Career | | 219 | 73 | 146 | .333 | | — | — | — | — | |
