= Eric Fernsten =

American basketball player (born 1953)

Personal information
- Born: November 1, 1953 (age 73) Oakland, California, U.S.
- Listed height: 6 ft 10 in (2.08 m)
- Listed weight: 205 lb (93 kg)

Career information
- High school: Skyline (Oakland, California)
- College: San Francisco (1972–1975)
- NBA draft: 1975: 4th round, 62nd overall pick
- Drafted by: Cleveland Cavaliers
- Playing career: 1975–1988
- Position: Center / power forward
- Number: 41, 23, 45

Career history
- 1975: Cleveland Cavaliers
- 1975–1977: Chicago Bulls
- 1977–1979: Mens Sana Siena
- 1979–1982: Boston Celtics
- 1983–1984: New York Knicks
- 1985–1986: Tampa Bay Thrillers
- 1986: Staten Island Stallions
- 1987–1988: Albany Patroons

Career highlights
- NBA champion (1981); 2× CBA champion (1986, 1988)
- Stats at NBA.com
- Stats at Basketball Reference

Eric Robert Fernsten (born November 1, 1953) is an American former professional basketball player. A 6'10" center from the University of San Francisco, Fernsten played in the National Basketball Association as a member of the Cleveland Cavaliers, Chicago Bulls, Boston Celtics, and New York Knicks.

== Professional career ==
Fernsten played in the National Basketball Association as a member of the Cleveland Cavaliers, Chicago Bulls, Boston Celtics, and New York Knicks. He averaged 2.4 points per game and 1.7 rebounds per game in his NBA career and participated on Boston's 1981 NBA Championship team. In the NBA finals, he scored 2 points and grabbed 2 rebounds in Boston's game 5 blowout win against Houston. Eric also played basketball in Europe for several years. Fernsten was a key practice player who pushed the veterans to work harder. Fernsten's career high in points came in 1980 against the Cavaliers when he scored 11 points while making 5 of 6 field goals.

Fernsten won Continental Basketball Association championships with the Tampa Bay Thrillers in 1986 and Albany Patroons in 1988.

== Career statistics ==
Legend
GP	Games played	GS	Games started	MPG	Minutes per game
FG%	Field goal percentage	3P%	3-point field goal percentage	FT%	Free throw percentage
RPG	Rebounds per game	APG	Assists per game	SPG	Steals per game
BPG	Blocks per game	PPG	Points per game	**Bold**	Career high
†	Won an NBA championship

=== NBA ===
==== Regular season ====
Year	Team	GP	GS	MPG	FG%	3P%	FT%	RPG	APG	SPG	BPG	PPG
1975–76	Cleveland	4		2.3	.000		–	.3	.0	.0	.0	.0
1975–76	Chicago	33	0	7.8	.393		.703	2.1	.6	.2	.4	2.8
1976–77	Chicago	5	0	12.2	.200		.727	**3.2**	**1.2**	.2	**.6**	2.8
1979–80†	Boston	**55**	0	7.7	.464	–	.635	1.7	.5	.3	.2	**3.1**
1980–81	Boston	45	0	6.2	.481	–	.667	1.4	.2	.1	.2	2.1
1981–82	Boston	43	0	4.7	.388		.633	1.0	.2	.1	.2	2.3
1983–84	New York	32	0	**12.6**	**.558**	–	**.735**	2.7	.3	**.5**	.3	2.6
Career		218	0	7.5	.445	–	.675	1.7	.4	.2	.2	2.4

==== Playoffs ====
Year	Team	GP	MPG	FG%	3P%	FT%	RPG	APG	SPG	BPG	PPG
1980	Boston	5	**3.6**	.333	–	**.667**	**1.0**	.0	.0	**.6**	**1.2**
1981†	Boston	**8**	1.8	.000	–	**.667**	.5	**.1**	**.1**	.0	.3
1982	Boston	5	2.2	**.500**	–	.500	.4	.0	.0	.2	.6
1984	New York	2	1.5	**.500**	–	–	.0	.0	.0	.0	1.0
Career		20	2.3	.308	–	.625	.6	.1	.1	.2	.7
