= Dick Miller (basketball) =

American basketball player (1958–2014)

Personal information
- Born: April 26, 1958 Milwaukee, Wisconsin, U.S.
- Died: January 11, 2014 (aged 55) Romulus, Michigan, U.S.
- Listed height: 6 ft 6 in (1.98 m)
- Listed weight: 215 lb (98 kg)

Career information
- High school: Thomas More (Milwaukee, Wisconsin)
- College: Toledo (1976–1980)
- NBA draft: 1980: 2nd round, 40th overall pick
- Drafted by: Indiana Pacers
- Playing career: 1980–1984
- Position: Small forward
- Number: 44, 30

Career history
- 1980: Indiana Pacers
- 1980–1981: Utah Jazz
- 1981: Anchorage Northern Knights
- 1981: Montana Golden Nuggets
- 1981–1982: Valladolid
- 1983–1984: Granollers

Career highlights
- First-team All-MAC (1980)
- Stats at NBA.com
- Stats at Basketball Reference
Medals
Representing United States
Men's basketball
Pan American Games
Gold medal – first place	1979 San Juan	Team competition

Richard Mathias Miller (April 26, 1958 – January 11, 2014) was an American professional basketball player. He was a 6-foot-6-inch (198 cm) 215 pounds (98 kg) small forward and played collegiately at the University of Toledo from 1976 to 1980.

Miller was selected with the 17th pick of the second round in the 1980 NBA draft by the Indiana Pacers. He played five games for the Pacers and another three games for the Utah Jazz in 1980-81.

== Death ==
Dick Miller died on January 11, 2014, in a Romulus, Michigan, hotel of an apparent heart attack. He was 55.

== Career statistics ==
Legend
GP	Games played	GS	Games started	MPG	Minutes per game
FG%	Field goal percentage	3P%	3-point field goal percentage	FT%	Free throw percentage
RPG	Rebounds per game	APG	Assists per game	SPG	Steals per game
BPG	Blocks per game	PPG	Points per game	**Bold**	Career high

=== NBA ===
==== Regular season ====
Year	Team	GP	GS	MPG	FG%	3P%	FT%	RPG	APG	SPG	BPG	PPG
1980–81	Indiana	**5**	0	**6.8**	.333	.000	–	.8	**.8**	**.6**	.0	.8
1980–81	Utah	3		6.3	**.667**	–	–	**1.0**	.3	.3	.0	**1.3**
Career		8	0	6.6	.444	–	–	.9	.6	.5	.0	1.0
