= 1980–81 Boston Celtics season =

NBA basketball team season (NBA champions)

- NBA champions
- Conference champions
- Division champions
- Head coach: Bill Fitch
- General manager: Red Auerbach
- Owners: Harry Mangurian
- Arena: Boston Garden; Hartford Civic Center

Results
- Record: 62–20 (.756)
- Place: Division: 1st (Atlantic); Conference: 1st (Eastern)
- Playoff finish: NBA champions (Defeated Rockets 4–2)
- Stats at Basketball Reference

Local media
- Television: WBZ-TV, WATR
- Radio: WBZ Radio, WTIC

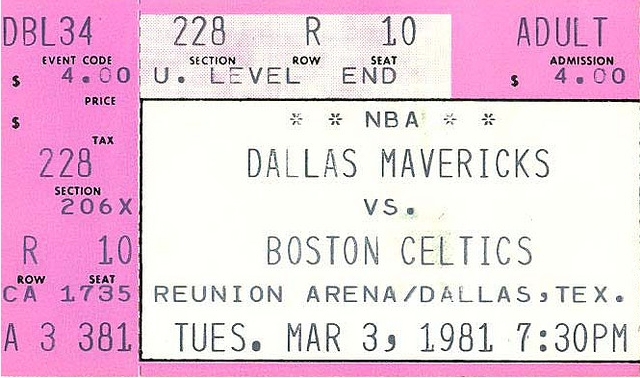
A ticket for a March 1981 game between the Boston Celtics and the Dallas Mavericks.

In 1980–81 the Boston Celtics went 62–20 under coach Bill Fitch. Despite losing center Dave Cowens to retirement late in training camp, the Celtics went on to capture the 1981 NBA Championship over the Houston Rockets. The highlight was that this championship was achieved just two years after Larry Bird had been drafted. Cedric Maxwell was named NBA Finals MVP.

== Offseason ==
=== NBA draft ===
After the 1979–80 season, Auerbach completed what may be the most lopsided trade in NBA history. Auerbach had always been a fan of stockpiling draft picks, so even after the success of 1979–80 the Celtics had both the 1st and 13th picks in the 1980 NBA draft left over from the M.L. Carr trade. Auerbach saw an opportunity to improve the team immediately, sending the two picks to the Golden State Warriors in exchange for center Robert Parish and the Warriors first round pick, the 3rd overall, University of Minnesota power forward Kevin McHale. With these three future Hall of Famers on the team the Celtics had a core in place to become a dominant team in the NBA.

Round	Pick	Player	Position	Nationality	School/Club team
1	1	Joe Barry Carroll	Center	United States	Purdue
1	13	Rickey Brown	Center	United States	Mississippi State

== Roster ==
1980–81 Boston Celtics roster
Players

Pos.	No.	Player	Height	Weight	DOB	From
G	7	Nate Archibald	6 ft 1 in (1.85 m)	150 lb (68 kg)	1948-09-02	UTEP
F	33	Larry Bird	6 ft 9 in (2.06 m)	220 lb (100 kg)	1956-12-07	Indiana State
F	30	M. L. Carr	6 ft 6 in (1.98 m)	205 lb (93 kg)	1951-01-09	Guilford
G	40	Terry Duerod	6 ft 2 in (1.88 m)	180 lb (82 kg)	1956-07-29	Detroit Mercy
C	45	Eric Fernsten	6 ft 10 in (2.08 m)	205 lb (93 kg)	1953-11-01	San Francisco
G	42	Chris Ford	6 ft 5 in (1.96 m)	190 lb (86 kg)	1949-01-11	Villanova
G	43	Gerald Henderson	6 ft 2 in (1.88 m)	175 lb (79 kg)	1956-01-16	VCU
F	31	Cedric Maxwell	6 ft 8 in (2.03 m)	205 lb (93 kg)	1955-11-21	Charlotte
F	32	Kevin McHale	6 ft 10 in (2.08 m)	210 lb (95 kg)	1957-12-19	Minnesota
C	00	Robert Parish	7 ft 1 in (2.16 m)	230 lb (104 kg)	1953-08-30	Centenary
C	53	Rick Robey	6 ft 11 in (2.11 m)	230 lb (104 kg)	1956-01-30	Kentucky

Coaches
Head coach
- Bill Fitch
Assistant(s)
- K. C. Jones
- Jimmy Rodgers

Legend
- (DP) Unsigned draft pick
- (FA) Free agent
- (S) Suspended
- (L) On leave from the team
- Injured

Roster

== Regular season ==
=== Season standings ===
Atlantic Division	W	L	PCT	GB	Home	Road	Div
y-Boston Celtics	62	20	.756	–	35–6	27–14	19–5
x-Philadelphia 76ers	62	20	.756	–	37–4	25–16	15–9
x-New York Knicks	50	32	.610	12.0	28–13	22–19	14–10
Washington Bullets	39	43	.476	23.0	26–15	13–28	8–16
New Jersey Nets	24	58	.293	38.0	16–25	8–33	8–16

#	Eastern Conference				
#	Team	W	L	PCT	GB
1	z-Boston Celtics	62	20	.756	–
2	y-Milwaukee Bucks	60	22	.732	2
3	x-Philadelphia 76ers	62	20	.756	–
4	x-New York Knicks	50	32	.610	12
5	x-Chicago Bulls	45	37	.549	17
6	x-Indiana Pacers	44	38	.537	18
7	Washington Bullets	39	43	.476	23
8	Atlanta Hawks	31	51	.378	31
9	Cleveland Cavaliers	28	54	.341	34
10	New Jersey Nets	24	58	.293	38
11	Detroit Pistons	21	61	.256	41

Notes

- z, y – division champions
- x – clinched playoff spot

== Game log ==
=== Regular season ===
1980–81 game log: 62–20 (Home: 35–6; Road: 27–14)
October: 6–3 (Home: 2–1; Road: 4–2)

Game	Date Time	Team	Score	High points	High rebounds	High assists	Location Attendance	Record
1	October 10	Cleveland	130–103				Boston Garden	1–0
2	October 14	@ Atlanta	116–122				The Omni	1–1
3	October 16	@ Milwaukee	110–103				MECCA Arena	2–1
4	October 18	@ Indiana	99–103				Market Square Arena	2–2
5	October 22	@ New Jersey	108–104				Rutgers Athletic Center	3–2
6	October 23	New York	107–109 (OT)				Hartford Civic Center	3–3
7	October 25	@ Washington	103–87				Capital Centre	4–3
8	October 29	@ Detroit	103–85				Pontiac Silverdome	5–3
9	October 31	Kansas City	115–110				Boston Garden	6–3

November: 9–4 (Home: 7–1; Road: 2–3)

Game	Date Time	Team	Score	High points	High rebounds	High assists	Location Attendance	Record
10	November 1	@ Philadelphia	113–117 (OT)				The Spectrum	6–4
11	November 5	Atlanta	104–87				Boston Garden	7–4
12	November 7	Milwaukee	101–102				Boston Garden	7–5
13	November 9	Chicago	111–105				Boston Garden	8–5
14	November 12	Washington	93–86				Boston Garden	9–5
15	November 14	New Jersey	126–102				Boston Garden	10–5
16	November 18	@ Chicago	113–107				Chicago Stadium	11–5
17	November 19	@ Indiana	103–91				Market Square Arena	12–5
18	November 21	Golden State	108–106				Boston Garden	13–5
19	November 22	@ Cleveland	98–113				Richfield Coliseum	13–6
20	November 26	Portland	126–101				Boston Garden	14–6
21	November 28	New York	120–106				Boston Garden	15–6
22	November 30	@ Milwaukee	105–107				MECCA Arena	15–7

December: 14–1 (Home: 7–1; Road: 7–0)

Game	Date Time	Team	Score	High points	High rebounds	High assists	Location Attendance	Record
23	December 2	@ Detroit	94–85				Pontiac Silverdome	16–7
24	December 3	Atlanta	106–101				Boston Garden	17–7
25	December 5	Dallas	97–87				Boston Garden	18–7
26	December 7	Washington	103–113				Hartford Civic Center	18–8
27	December 9	Milwaukee	112–89				Boston Garden	19–8
28	December 10	@ Washington	101–99				Capital Centre	20–8
29	December 12	New Jersey	119–104				Boston Garden	21–8
30	December 13	@ Chicago	106–95				Chicago Stadium	22–8
31	December 17	Chicago	115–98				Boston Garden	23–8
32	December 19	Houston	133–119				Boston Garden	24–8
33	December 20	@ Cleveland	107–102				Richfield Coliseum	25–8
34	December 23	Denver	136–128				Boston Garden	26–8
35	December 25	@ New York	117–108				Madison Square Garden	27–8
36	December 27	@ Atlanta	112–107				The Omni	28–8
37	December 30	@ Phoenix	116–97				Arizona Veterans Memorial Coliseum	29–8

January: 14–2 (Home: 10–0; Road: 4–2)

Game	Date Time	Team	Score	High points	High rebounds	High assists	Location Attendance	Record
38	January 1	@ San Diego	88–85				San Diego Sports Arena	30–8
39	January 2	@ Golden State	106–121				Oakland-Alameda County Coliseum Arena	30–9
40	January 4	@ Portland	120–111				Memorial Coliseum	31–9
41	January 7	Phoenix	108–90				Boston Garden	32–9
42	January 9	Chicago	117–111 (OT)				Boston Garden	33–9
43	January 10	@ New Jersey	117–115				Rutgers Athletic Center	34–9
44	January 13	@ New York	93–89				Madison Square Garden	35–9
45	January 14	Cleveland	120–113				Boston Garden	36–9
46	January 16	San Antonio	94–85				Boston Garden	37–9
47	January 18	Los Angeles	98–96				Boston Garden	38–9
48	January 19	Detroit	92–90				Hartford Civic Center	39–9
49	January 21	Utah	117–87				Boston Garden	40–9
50	January 23	Indiana	104–103				Boston Garden	41–9
51	January 25	Seattle	115–106				Boston Garden	42–9
52	January 28	Philadelphia	104–101				Boston Garden	43–9
53	January 29	@ Chicago	85–108				Chicago Stadium	43–10

February: 8–5 (Home: 3–0; Road: 5–5)

Game	Date Time	Team	Score	High points	High rebounds	High assists	Location Attendance	Record
54	February 4	@ Philadelphia	104–107				The Spectrum	43–11
55	February 5	@ Milwaukee	103–113				MECCA Arena	43–12
56	February 6	Indiana	111–98				Boston Garden	44–12
57	February 8	San Diego	123–107				Boston Garden	45–12
58	February 10	@ Seattle	107–108 (OT)				Kingdome	45–13
59	February 11	@ Los Angeles	105–91				The Forum	46–13
60	February 13	@ Utah	89–104				Salt Palace	46–14
61	February 15	@ Denver	120–118				McNichols Sports Arena	47–14
62	February 17	@ San Antonio	128–116				HemisFair Arena	48–14
63	February 18	@ Kansas City	113–114				Kemper Arena	48–15
64	February 21	@ Detroit	130–119				Pontiac Silverdome	49–15
65	February 25	Cleveland	124–103				Boston Garden	50–15
66	February 27	@ Atlanta	132–102				The Omni	51–15

March: 11–5 (Home: 6–3; Road: 5–2)

Game	Date Time	Team	Score	High points	High rebounds	High assists	Location Attendance	Record
67	March 1	Philadelphia	114–107				Boston Garden	52–15
68	March 3	@ Dallas	117–105				Reunion Arena	53–15
69	March 4	@ Houston	108–101				The Summit	54–15
70	March 6	@ Indiana	104–110				Market Square Arena	54–16
71	March 8	New York	115–94				Boston Garden	55–16
72	March 11	Milwaukee	122–108				Boston Garden	56–16
73	March 13	Indiana	94–101				Boston Garden	56–17
74	March 15	New Jersey	133–125				Boston Garden	57–17
75	March 17	@ Washington	112–91				Capital Centre	58–17
76	March 18	Atlanta	97–108				Boston Garden	58–18
77	March 20	Washington	128–116				Boston Garden	59–18
78	March 22	@ Philadelphia	94–126				The Spectrum	59–19
79	March 24	@ New York	118–116				Madison Square Garden	60–19
80	March 25	@ New Jersey	111–105				Rutgers Athletic Center	61–19
81	March 27	Detroit	90–115				Boston Garden	61–20
82	March 29	Philadelphia	98–94				Boston Garden	62–20

1981 regular season schedule

=== Playoffs ===
1981 playoff game log
Conference Semifinals: 4–0 (home: 2–0; road: 2–0)

Game	Date	Team	Score	High points	High rebounds	High assists	Location Attendance	Series
1	April 5	Chicago	W 121–109	Larry Bird (23)	Larry Bird (12)	Bird, Maxwell (5)	Boston Garden; 15,320	1–0
2	April 7	Chicago	W 106–97	Archibald, Parish (27)	Larry Bird (12)	Larry Bird (9)	Boston Garden; 15,320	2–0
3	April 10	@ Chicago	W 113–107	Larry Bird (24)	Larry Bird (17)	Larry Bird (10)	Chicago Stadium; 19,995	3–0
4	April 12	@ Chicago	W 109–103	Larry Bird (35)	Larry Bird (11)	Tiny Archibald (6)	Chicago Stadium; 18,249	4–0

Conference Finals: 4–3 (home: 3–1; road: 1–2)

Game	Date	Team	Score	High points	High rebounds	High assists	Location Attendance	Series
1	April 21	Philadelphia	L 104–105	Larry Bird (33)	Robert Parish (13)	Tiny Archibald (9)	Boston Garden; 15,320	0–1
2	April 22	Philadelphia	W 118–99	Larry Bird (34)	Larry Bird (16)	Larry Bird (5)	Boston Garden; 15,320	1–1
3	April 24	@ Philadelphia	L 100–110	Larry Bird (22)	Larry Bird (13)	Tiny Archibald (5)	Spectrum; 18,276	1–2
4	April 26	@ Philadelphia	L 105–107	Cedric Maxwell (20)	Larry Bird (17)	Tiny Archibald (14)	Spectrum; 18,276	1–3
5	April 29	Philadelphia	W 111–109	Larry Bird (32)	Larry Bird (11)	Tiny Archibald (7)	Boston Garden; 15,320	2–3
6	May 1	@ Philadelphia	W 111–109	Larry Bird (25)	Larry Bird (16)	Tiny Archibald (6)	Spectrum; 18,276	3–3
7	May 3	Philadelphia	W 91–90	Larry Bird (23)	Larry Bird (11)	Tiny Archibald (7)	Boston Garden; 15,320	4–3

NBA Finals: 4–2 (home: 2–1; road: 2–1)

Game	Date	Team	Score	High points	High rebounds	High assists	Location Attendance	Series
1	May 5	Houston	W 98–95	Larry Bird (18)	Larry Bird (21)	Larry Bird (9)	Boston Garden; 15,320	1–0
2	May 7	Houston	L 90–91	Larry Bird (19)	Larry Bird (21)	Archibald, Henderson (4)	Boston Garden; 15,320	1–1
3	May 9	@ Houston	W 94–71	Cedric Maxwell (19)	Larry Bird (13)	Larry Bird (10)	The Summit; 16,121	2–1
4	May 10	@ Houston	L 86–91	Cedric Maxwell (24)	Cedric Maxwell (14)	Larry Bird (7)	The Summit; 16,121	2–2
5	May 12	Houston	W 109–80	Cedric Maxwell (28)	Cedric Maxwell (15)	Larry Bird (8)	Boston Garden; 15,320	3–2
6	May 14	@ Houston	W 102–91	Larry Bird (27)	Larry Bird (13)	Tiny Archibald (12)	The Summit; 16,121	4–2

1981 schedule

== Player stats ==
Note: GP= Games played; REB= Rebounds; AST= Assists; STL = Steals; BLK = Blocks; PTS = Points; AVG = Average

Player	GP	REB	AST	STL	BLK	PTS	AVG
Nate Archibald	80	176	618	75	18	1106	13.8
Larry Bird	82	895	451	161	63	1741	21.2
M. L. Carr	41	83	56	30	18	248	6.0
Eric Fernsten	45	62	10	6	7	96	2.1
Chris Ford	82	163	295	100	23	728	8.9
Wayne Kreklow	25	12	9	2	1	30	1.2
Cedric Maxwell	81	525	219	79	68	1234	15.2
Kevin McHale	82	359	55	27	151	818	10.0
Robert Parish	82	777	144	81	214	1552	18.9
Rick Robey	82	390	126	38	19	740	9.0

== Award winners ==
- Nate Archibald, All-NBA Second Team
- Larry Bird, All-NBA First Team
- Cedric Maxwell, NBA Finals Most Valuable Player Award
- Kevin McHale, All-NBA Rookie Team
