= Dudley Bradley =

American basketball player (born 1957)

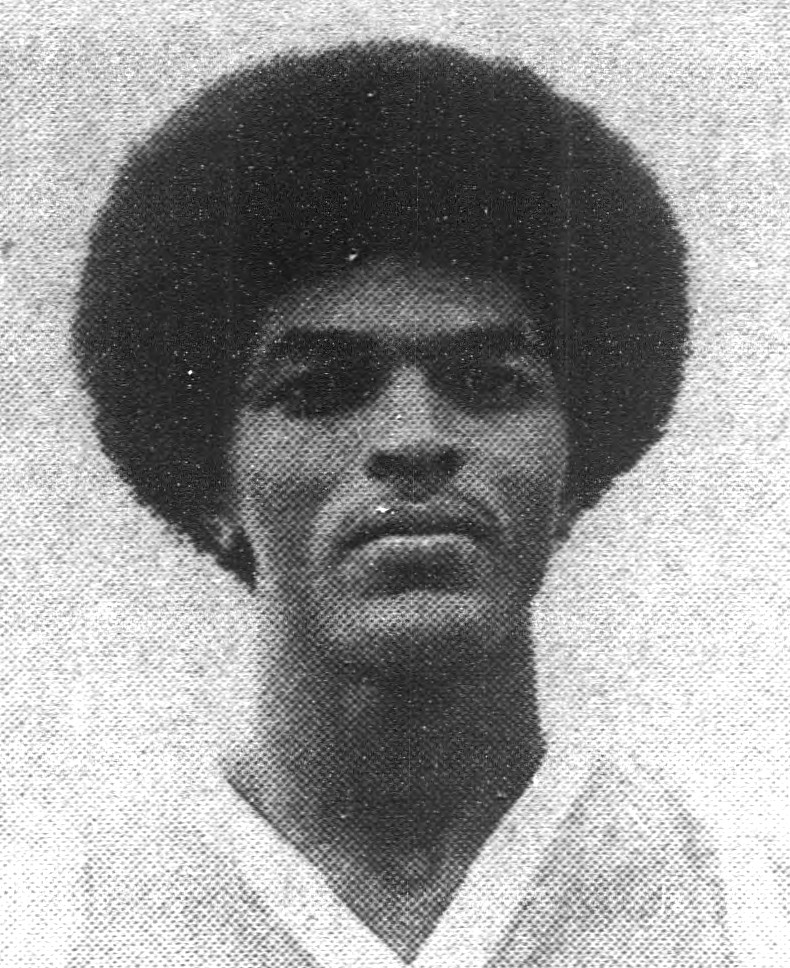
- Bradley, circa 1976

Personal information
- Born: March 19, 1957 (age 69) Baltimore, Maryland, U.S.
- Listed height: 6 ft 6 in (1.98 m)
- Listed weight: 195 lb (88 kg)

Career information
- High school: Edgewood (Edgewood, Maryland)
- College: North Carolina (1975–1979)
- NBA draft: 1979: 1st round, 13th overall pick
- Drafted by: Indiana Pacers
- Playing career: 1979–1993
- Position: Small forward / shooting guard
- Number: 7, 22, 24

Career history
- 1979–1981: Indiana Pacers
- 1981–1982: Phoenix Suns
- 1982–1983: Chicago Bulls
- 1983–1984: Detroit Spirits
- 1983–1984: Toronto Tornados
- 1984–1986: Washington Bullets
- 1986–1987: Milwaukee Bucks
- 1987–1988: New Jersey Nets
- 1988–1989: Atlanta Hawks
- 1991: Saskatchewan Storm
- 1991–1992: Omaha Racers
- 1992–1993: Oklahoma City Cavalry

Career highlights
- NBA All-Defensive Second Team (1981); CBA All-Defensive First Team (1984); ACC tournament MVP (1979)

Career NBA statistics
- Points: 3,131 (5.2 ppg)
- Rebounds: 1,098 (1.8 rpg)
- Assists: 1,147 (1.9 apg)
- Stats at NBA.com
- Stats at Basketball Reference

Dudley Leroy Bradley (born March 19, 1957) is an American former professional basketball player who played nine seasons in the National Basketball Association (NBA).

Bradley played collegiately for the North Carolina Tar Heels and was selected 13th overall in the 1979 NBA draft by the Indiana Pacers. He played for seven different NBA teams and left the league after the 1988–89 NBA season with averages of 5.2 points, 1.8 rebounds, and 1.9 assists per game.

In two separate games in November 1980, as a member of the Pacers, Bradley recorded a notable 9 steals. The season before (1979–80) he set an NBA rookie record for steals in a season with 211 (2.57 per game).

As a college player, Bradley made one of the most memorable plays in University of North Carolina history on Jan. 17, 1979. With the game clock under 10 seconds and the Tar Heels trailing by one point in a road game against rival N.C. State, Bradley stole the ball from Wolfpack guard Clyde Austin and dribbled for an uncontested dunk that gave UNC a 70–69 win. His prowess at forcing turnovers and defending opposing players in college earned Bradley the nickname "The Secretary of Defense."

Bradley played for the Detroit Spirits of the Continental Basketball Association (CBA) during the 1983–84 season and was selected to the All-Defensive First Team.

After his NBA career, Bradley played a season or two in the World Basketball League. He played in that league for the Saskatchewan Storm in 1990–91. He also worked as a coach in the Continental Basketball Association and the World Basketball League. In 1994, he was named head coach of the Brevard College Tornados men's basketball team, a position he held until 1999.

In September 2003, Bradley became a Maryland Transportation Authority police officer.

== NBA career statistics ==
Legend
GP	Games played	GS	Games started	MPG	Minutes per game
FG%	Field goal percentage	3P%	3-point field goal percentage	FT%	Free throw percentage
RPG	Rebounds per game	APG	Assists per game	SPG	Steals per game
BPG	Blocks per game	PPG	Points per game	**Bold**	Career high

=== Regular season ===
Year	Team	GP	GS	MPG	FG%	3P%	FT%	RPG	APG	SPG	BPG	PPG
1979–80	Indiana	**82**	-	**24.7**	.452	**.400**	.782	**2.7**	**3.1**	**2.6**	0.6	**8.4**
1980–81	Indiana	**82**	-	22.8	.474	.125	.702	2.4	2.3	2.3	0.5	8.0
1981–82	Phoenix	64	3	14.6	.445	.250	.740	1.4	1.3	1.2	0.2	5.1
1982–83	Chicago	58	11	11.8	**.516**	.200	.800	1.8	1.8	0.8	0.2	3.5
1984–85	Washington	73	**24**	16.9	.475	.313	.684	1.8	2.4	1.3	0.3	4.9
1985–86	Washington	70	7	12.0	.349	.250	.571	1.4	1.5	1.2	0.0	2.8
1986–87	Milwaukee	68	2	13.2	.357	.260	**.810**	1.5	1.0	1.5	0.1	3.1
1987–88	Milwaukee	2	0	2.5	.000	.000	.000	0.5	0.5	0.0	0.0	0.0
1987–88	New Jersey	63	15	22.7	.429	.366	.763	2.0	2.4	1.8	**0.7**	6.7
1988–89	Atlanta	38	0	7.0	.326	.258	.500	0.8	0.6	0.4	0.1	1.9
Career		600	62	17.0	.440	.293	.730	1.8	1.9	1.6	0.3	5.2

=== Playoffs ===
Year	Team	GP	GS	MPG	FG%	3P%	FT%	RPG	APG	SPG	BPG	PPG
1980–81	Indiana	2	-	9.5	.333	**1.000**	**1.000**	1.0	1.0	**1.0**	0.0	4.5
1981–82	Phoenix	7	-	3.4	.250	.000	**1.000**	0.1	0.7	0.1	**0.1**	0.7
1984–85	Washington	4	0	10.3	**.556**	.200	.750	**1.5**	**1.5**	0.5	0.0	3.5
1985–86	Washington	5	0	**16.4**	.414	.300	.667	1.0	1.4	**1.0**	0.0	**6.6**
1986–87	Milwaukee	**12**	0	3.8	.364	.000	.500	0.0	0.2	0.3	0.0	0.8
Career		30	0	7.1	.394	.227	.722	0.5	0.7	0.4	0.0	2.3

== See also ==
- List of National Basketball Association players with 9 or more steals in a game
