= Nate Archibald =

American basketball player (born 1948)

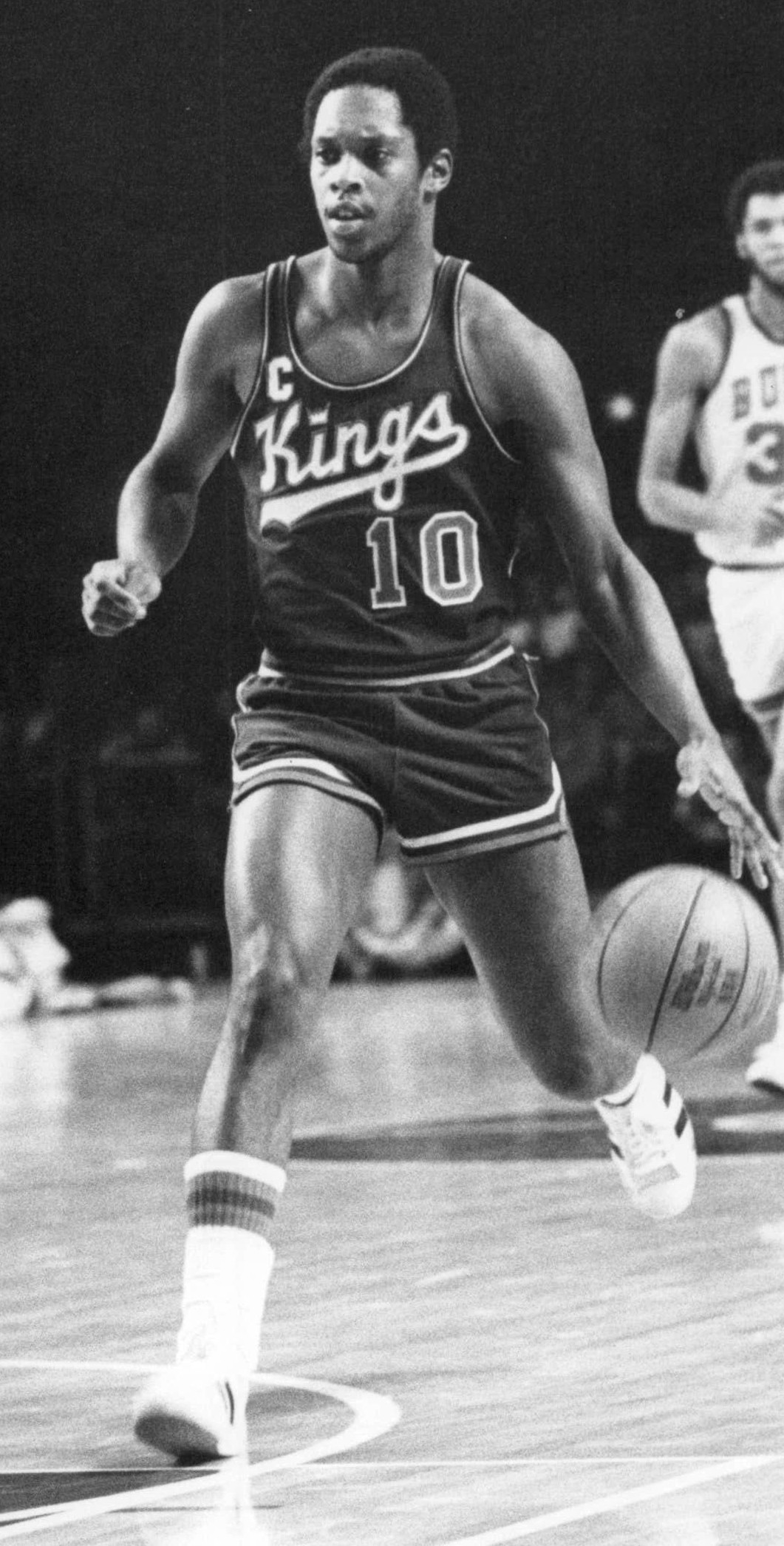
- Archibald with the Kansas City-Omaha Kings in 1974

Personal information
- Born: September 2, 1948 (age 78) New York City, New York, U.S.
- Listed height: 6 ft 1 in (1.85 m)
- Listed weight: 150 lb (68 kg)

Career information
- High school: DeWitt Clinton (Bronx, New York)
- College: Arizona Western (1966–1967); UTEP (1967–1970)
- NBA draft: 1970: 2nd round, 19th overall pick
- Drafted by: Cincinnati Royals
- Playing career: 1970–1984
- Position: Point guard
- Number: 10, 1, 7

Career history
- 1970–1976: Cincinnati Royals / Kansas City-Omaha / Kansas City Kings
- 1976–1977: New York Nets
- 1978–1983: Boston Celtics
- 1983–1984: Milwaukee Bucks

Career highlights
- NBA champion (1981); 6× NBA All-Star (1973, 1975, 1976, 1980–1982); NBA All-Star Game MVP (1981); 3× All-NBA First Team (1973, 1975, 1976); 2× All-NBA Second Team (1972, 1981); NBA scoring champion (1973); NBA assists leader (1973); NBA anniversary team (50th, 75th); No. 1 retired by Sacramento Kings; First-team All-WAC (1970); No. 14 retired by UTEP Miners

Career statistics
- Points: 16,481 (18.8 ppg)
- Assists: 6,476 (7.4 apg)
- Rebounds: 2,046 (2.3 rpg)
- Stats at NBA.com
- Stats at Basketball Reference
- Basketball Hall of Fame
- Collegiate Basketball Hall of Fame

Nathaniel "Tiny" Archibald (born September 2, 1948) is an American former professional basketball player. He spent 14 years playing in the National Basketball Association (NBA), most notably with the Cincinnati Royals/Kansas City–Omaha Kings and Boston Celtics. In 1991, he was enshrined into both the Naismith Memorial Basketball Hall of Fame and the New York City Basketball Hall of Fame.

Archibald was a willing passer and an adequate shooter from midrange. However, it was his quickness, speed and shiftiness that made him difficult to guard in the open court, as he would regularly drive past defenders on his way to the basket. This versatility helped Archibald lead the NBA in scoring and assists in the same season (1972–73), making him the second of only two players in league history to achieve such a feat, joining Oscar Robertson, who accomplished the feat in the 1967-1968 season.

== Early life ==
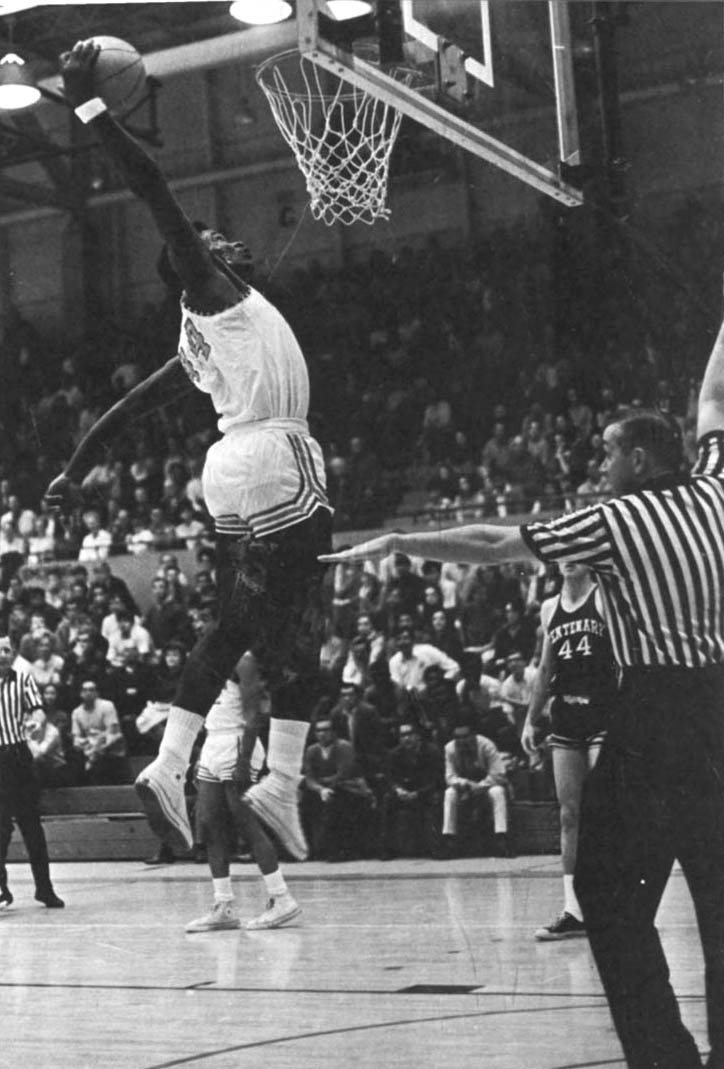
Archibald scoring for the UTEP in 1968

Archibald, a playground legend while growing up in a rough-and-tumble neighborhood in the South Bronx of New York City, played high school basketball for only one-and-a-half seasons, and was cut from the varsity squad at DeWitt Clinton High School as a sophomore. He returned to the team as a junior. During his time without basketball, Archibald briefly flirted with dropping out of school after having been largely truant in past years. But with the help of two mentors, Floyd Layne and Pablo Robertson, Archibald turned it around. Robertson, a former standout at Loyola of Chicago and a Harlem, New York playground impresario, had seen the gifted, mercurial Archibald in action on the playgrounds and convinced the young man's high school coach to re-instate him on the squad.

Despite playing in just blowouts as a junior, the shy, quiet teen managed to blossom into a high-school star, being named team captain and an All-City selection in 1966. Off the court, Archibald began to attend school regularly and worked to improve his poor academic standing, which deterred most colleges from offering him a scholarship.

== College career ==
To improve his chances of playing major college basketball, Archibald enrolled at Arizona Western College, transferring to the University of Texas at El Paso (UTEP) the following year. He had three standout seasons at El Paso, from 1967 to 1970 under Hall of Fame coach Don Haskins.

== Professional career ==
=== Cincinnati Royals / Kansas City-Omaha / Kansas City Kings (1970–1976) ===
Archibald was selected in the second round of the 1970 NBA draft (19th pick) by the Cincinnati Royals. He was also drafted by the Texas Chaparrals of the American Basketball Association. In his NBA debut, Archibald recorded 17 points and seven assists in a 128–104 loss to the New York Knicks. On March 13, 1971, Archibald set a then-career-high by scoring 47 points in a 136–127 victory over the Atlanta Hawks.

On November 18, 1972, Archibald recorded 51 points and 14 assists in a 127–117 win over the Houston Rockets.

In the 1972–73 season, Archibald led the NBA in scoring and assists (with 34 points and 11.4 assists, in 46 minutes a game, with all three averages being career-highs), becoming the first player to win the titles in both categories in the same season (In the 1967–68 season, Oscar Robertson led the NBA in points and assists per game but did not win the titles because they were based on totals rather than averages at the time.). Archibald's scoring average of 34.0 points per game broke the NBA record for a guard and, as of 2023, is still a record for point guards. His 910 assists that season (11.4 assists per game) were also an NBA record at the time, breaking Guy Rodgers' mark of 908. He was named the Sporting News NBA MVP that season.

Just one season after leading the NBA in both scoring and assists, Archibald severely injured his Achilles tendon during the first game of the 1973–74 season. He spent months in a cast and was limited to just 35 games that season.

During the 1975 NBA Playoffs, Archibald made the postseason for the first time in his career after the then-Kansas City Kings finished 44–38 in the regular season. Archibald went on to average 20.2 points and 5.3 assists in a six-game series loss in the first round to Bob Love and the Chicago Bulls.

Archibald played for the Royals/Kings franchise from 1970 to 1976.

=== New York Nets (1976–1977) ===
Although Archibald was the Kings' most popular player, he was traded to the New York Nets for two first round draft picks (future all-star Otis Birdsong and rookie of the year Phil Ford), Jim Eakins and Brian Taylor in 1976. Archibald would go on to average a comparatively low 20.5 points per game in his 34 games with the Nets.

=== Buffalo Braves (1977–1978) ===
Injured for much of the 1976–77 season, Archibald was traded by the Nets to the Buffalo Braves before the 1977–78 season, again for two first round draft picks (this time eventually becoming renowned defender Micheal Ray Richardson and prolific scorer Clifford Robinson), as well as George Johnson. Archibald tore his Achilles tendon and never played a regular-season game for the Braves.

=== Boston Celtics (1978–1983) ===
Buffalo traded Archibald to the Boston Celtics as part of a seven-player deal before the start of the next season. His career at the Celtics started poorly. He showed up 20 pounds overweight. However, he adjusted and helped guide the Celtics to the best record in the NBA for three consecutive years (1979–1982). Archibald won his first and only NBA championship with the Boston Celtics in the 1980–81 season alongside young NBA star Larry Bird. In Game 6 of the 1981 NBA Finals, Archibald recorded 13 points and 12 assists as the Celtics closed out the series against the Houston Rockets.

On February 15, 1982, Archibald recorded a tenure-high 23 assists in a 145–144 win over the Denver Nuggets.

=== Milwaukee Bucks (1983–1984) ===
After being waived by the Celtics, Archibald played the 1983–84 season with the Bucks; this was his final season. He started at point guard in all 46 games he played.

== Legacy ==
Archibald was an All-NBA First Team selection three times (1973, 1975, 1976) and an All-NBA Second Team selection two times (1972, 1981). A seven-time NBA All-Star Game selection (1973, 1974, 1975, 1976, 1980, 1981, and 1982), he was named the 1981 NBA All-Star Game MVP. Archibald led the NBA in free throws made three times and free throw attempts twice. He competed in 876 professional games, scored 16,841 points (18.8 points per game), and dished out 6,476 assists. He was named one of the 50 Greatest Players in NBA History in 1996. In 1991 Archibald was inducted into the Naismith Basketball Hall of Fame in Springfield, MA, and into the New York City Basketball Hall of Fame in NYC. In 2021, he was announced as part of the NBA's 75th anniversary team. To commemorate the NBA's 75th Anniversary The Athletic ranked their top 75 players of all time, and named Archibald as the 67th greatest player in NBA history.

== Coaching career ==
Archibald was an assistant coach, spending one season in the University of Georgia and two with Texas-El Paso (where he worked with Tim Hardaway). He has also coached the New Jersey Jammers of the USBL and in a Boston recreational league. Archibald coached in the National Basketball Development League in 2001. He resigned a year later to take a position with the NBA's community relations department. Archibald was also named the head coach for the Long Beach Jam in 2004 in the revived ABA, but he would ultimately resign from his position on January 17, 2005, during their second and final season in the ABA. The Long Beach Jam later moved to Bakersfield when they moved to the NBA Development League in 2006 and are now currently the Motor City Cruise for the NBA G League.

== NBA career statistics ==
Legend
GP	Games played	GS	Games started	MPG	Minutes per game
FG%	Field goal percentage	3P%	3-point field goal percentage	FT%	Free throw percentage
RPG	Rebounds per game	APG	Assists per game	SPG	Steals per game
BPG	Blocks per game	PPG	Points per game	**Bold**	Career high
†	Won an NBA championship	*	Led the league

=== Regular season ===
Year	Team	GP	GS	MPG	FG%	3P%	FT%	RPG	APG	SPG	BPG	PPG
1970–71	Cincinnati	**82**	—	35.0	.444	—	.757	**3.0**	5.5	—	—	16.0
1971–72	Cincinnati	76	—	43.1	.486	—	.822	2.9	9.2	—	—	28.2
1972–73	Kansas City–Omaha	80	—	**46.0***	.488	—	.847	2.8	**11.4***	—	—	**34.0***
1973–74	Kansas City–Omaha	35	—	36.3	.451	—	.820	2.4	7.6	1.6	0.2	17.6
1974–75	Kansas City–Omaha	**82**	—	39.6	.456	—	**.872**	2.7	6.8	1.5	0.1	26.5
1975–76	Kansas City	78	—	40.8	.453	—	.802	2.7	7.9	1.6	0.2	24.8
1976–77	New York	34	—	37.6	.446	—	.785	2.4	7.5	**1.7**	**0.3**	20.5
1978–79	Boston	69	—	24.1	.452	—	.788	1.5	4.7	0.8	0.1	11.0
1979–80	Boston	80	80	35.8	.482	.222	.830	2.5	8.4	1.3	0.1	14.1
1980–81†	Boston	80	72	35.3	**.499**	.000	.816	2.2	7.7	0.9	0.2	13.8
1981–82	Boston	68	51	31.9	.472	**.375**	.747	1.7	8.0	0.8	0.0	12.6
1982–83	Boston	66	19	27.4	.425	.208	.743	1.4	6.2	0.6	0.1	10.5
1983–84	Milwaukee	46	46	22.6	.487	.222	.634	1.7	3.5	0.7	0.0	7.4
Career		876	268	35.6	.467	.224	.810	2.3	7.4	1.1	0.1	18.8
All-Star		6	4	27.0	.450	—	.833	3.0	6.7	1.8	0.2	12.3

=== Playoffs ===
Year	Team	GP	GS	MPG	FG%	3P%	FT%	RPG	APG	SPG	BPG	PPG
1975	Kansas City–Omaha	6	—	**40.3**	.364	—	.814	1.8	5.3	0.7	0.0	**20.2**
1980	Boston	9	—	36.9	**.506**	**.500**	.881	1.2	**7.9**	**1.1**	0.0	14.2
1981†	Boston	**17**	—	37.1	.450	.000	.809	1.6	6.3	0.8	0.0	15.6
1982	Boston	8	—	34.6	.429	.000	**.893**	**2.1**	6.5	0.6	**0.3**	10.6
1983	Boston	7	—	23.0	.324	.167	.759	1.4	6.3	0.3	0.0	9.6
Career		47	—	34.9	.423	.118	.826	1.6	6.5	0.7	0.0	14.2

== Personal life ==
Archibald completed his bachelor's degree from University of Texas-El Paso by going back for three consecutive summers just prior to finishing his NBA career. He then taught in the New York City school system and attended night school at Fordham University. Archibald received a master's degree from Fordham University in 1990 and a professional diploma in supervision and administration in 1994. He began long-distance correspondence work toward a doctorate from California Coast University in 2000, but ceased his studies because of "his lack of funds and the motivation to complete a long-distance correspondence curriculum". Archibald has stated his hope to complete the degree in the future at Fordham.

Archibald was diagnosed with amyloidosis in 2016, and received a heart transplant in 2018.

== See also ==
- List of NBA career assists leaders
- List of NBA annual scoring leaders
- List of NBA annual assists leaders
- List of NBA annual minutes leaders
- List of NBA single-game assists leaders
- Bronx Walk of Fame
