= George L. Johnson =

American basketball player (born 1956)

George Johnson
Personal information
- Born: December 8, 1956 (age 69) Brooklyn, New York, U.S.
- Listed height: 6 ft 7 in (2.01 m)
- Listed weight: 210 lb (95 kg)

Career information
- High school: New Utrecht (Brooklyn, New York)
- College: St. John's (1974–1978)
- NBA draft: 1978: 1st round, 12th overall pick
- Drafted by: Milwaukee Bucks
- Playing career: 1978–1992
- Position: Power forward
- Number: 24, 20, 12, 31

Career history
- 1978–1979: Milwaukee Bucks
- 1979–1980: Denver Nuggets
- 1980–1984: Indiana Pacers
- 1984–1985: Philadelphia 76ers
- 1985: Washington Bullets
- 1988–1989: Badajoz Caja Rural
- 1989: S. Bennedetto Gorizia
- 1989–1991: Valvi Girona
- 1992: Long Island Surf

Career highlights
- Haggerty Award winner (1978)

Career NBA statistics
- Points: 4,214 (9.1 ppg)
- Rebounds: 2,610 (5.6 rpg)
- Assists: 817 (1.8 apg)
- Stats at NBA.com
- Stats at Basketball Reference

George Lee Johnson (born December 8, 1956) is an American former professional basketball player.

A 6'7" forward/center from St. John's University and born in Brooklyn, New York, Johnson played in the National Basketball Association (NBA) from 1978 to 1985 as a member of the Milwaukee Bucks, Denver Nuggets, Indiana Pacers, Philadelphia 76ers, and Washington Bullets. He averaged 9.1 points per game and 5.6 rebounds per game in his NBA career.

Johnson was player-coach for the Long Island Surf of the United States Basketball League in 1992.

== NBA career statistics ==
Legend
GP	Games played	GS	Games started	MPG	Minutes per game
FG%	Field goal percentage	3P%	3-point field goal percentage	FT%	Free throw percentage
RPG	Rebounds per game	APG	Assists per game	SPG	Steals per game
BPG	Blocks per game	PPG	Points per game	**Bold**	Career high

=== Regular season ===
Year	Team	GP	GS	MPG	FG%	3P%	FT%	RPG	APG	SPG	BPG	PPG
1978–79	Milwaukee	67	–	17.3	**.482**	–	.718	5.4	1.2	**1.1**	0.7	6.2
1979–80	Denver	75	–	25.8	.476	.222	.783	**7.8**	2.1	**1.1**	**0.9**	10.2
1980–81	Indiana	43	–	21.6	.462	.000	.762	6.5	2.0	**1.1**	0.5	10.6
1981–82	Indiana	59	4	12.2	.412	.000	.750	3.7	0.7	0.6	0.4	5.1
1982–83	Indiana	**82**	**64**	**28.0**	.477	.184	.733	6.6	**2.7**	0.9	0.6	11.6
1983–84	Indiana	81	20	25.6	.465	**.234**	.826	5.7	2.4	1.0	0.6	**13.0**
1984–85	Philadelphia	55	3	13.7	.407	.100	.875	3.0	0.7	0.6	0.3	4.8
1985–86	Washington	2	0	3.5	.333	.000	**1.000**	1.0	0.0	0.0	0.0	2.0
Career		464	91	21.3	.463	.189	.779	5.6	1.8	0.9	0.6	9.1

=== Playoffs ===
Year	Team	GP	GS	MPG	FG%	3P%	FT%	RPG	APG	SPG	BPG	PPG
1980–81	Indiana	2	–	**11.5**	**.625**	.000	.000	**2.0**	**0.5**	0.0	0.0	**5.0**
1984–85	Philadelphia	**5**	0	4.8	**.625**	**1.000**	.000	1.4	0.0	0.0	0.0	2.2
Career		7	0	6.7	.625	1.000	.000	1.6	0.1	0.0	0.0	3.0
