= Jack McKinney (basketball) =

American basketball player and coach (1935–2018)

Personal information
- Born: July 13, 1935 Chester, Pennsylvania, U.S.
- Died: September 25, 2018 (aged 83) Bonita Springs, Florida, U.S.
- Listed height: 6 ft 1 in (1.85 m)

Career information
- High school: St. James (Chester, Pennsylvania)
- College: Saint Joseph's (1954–1957)
- Position: Guard
- Coaching career: 1959–1984

Career history

Coaching
- 1959–1960: St. James HS
- 1960–1965: Saint Joseph's (assistant)
- 1965–1966: Philadelphia Textile
- 1966–1974: Saint Joseph's
- 1974–1976: Milwaukee Bucks (assistant)
- 1976–1979: Portland Trail Blazers (assistant)
- 1979: Los Angeles Lakers
- 1980–1984: Indiana Pacers
- 1984: Kansas City Kings

Career highlights
- NBA Coach of the Year (1981); As assistant coach: NBA champion (1977)

Career coaching record
- NBA: 136–215 (.387)
- College: 163–83 (.663)
- Record at Basketball Reference

John Paul McKinney (July 13, 1935 – September 25, 2018) was an American college and professional basketball coach. In 1979, as a head coach in the National Basketball Association (NBA) with the Los Angeles Lakers, he introduced an up-tempo style of play that became known as Showtime. This was his only season with the Lakers, which ended prematurely after a bicycle accident. McKinney later joined the Indiana Pacers, where he was named NBA Coach of the Year in 1981. He also coached the Kansas City Kings (now known as the Sacramento Kings), and served as an assistant coach for the Milwaukee Bucks and the Portland Trail Blazers.

== Early life ==
John Paul McKinney was born on July 13, 1935, in Chester, Pennsylvania, to Paul McKinney, a police detective, and Jen McMahon, a homemaker. He attended St. James High in Chester, where he played basketball under coach Jack Ramsay. He graduated in 1953.

== College career ==
McKinney went to college at Saint Joseph's University in Philadelphia. He played three seasons for the Hawks, also coached by Ramsay, and led the team to the Big 5's inaugural title and the school's first postseason appearance in the 1956 National Invitation Tournament (NIT). He was also a member of their track and field team.

== Coaching career ==
=== St. James High School (1959–1960) ===
McKinney coached one season at St. James in 1959–60, leading them to a 17–11 record.

=== Saint Joseph's (1960–1965) ===
McKinney coached five years at his alma mater St. Joseph's as an assistant under Ramsay.

=== Philadelphia Textile (1965–1966) ===
McKinney was the head coach at Philadelphia Textile for one season in 1965–66.

=== Saint Joseph's (1966–1974) ===
McKinney returned to St. Joe's in 1966, replacing the departed Ramsay as head coach. McKinney is a member of the Saint Joseph's and the Big 5 Halls of Fame. He was also named the Eastern Coach of the Year by Philadelphia sportswriters for his 1973–74 season when the Hawks, predicted to have a poor year after graduating Mike Bantom to the NBA and Pat McFarland to the American Basketball Association (ABA), had a stellar season again winning their conference and qualifying for postseason play. However, he was fired after a first-round loss in the 1974 NCAA Division I basketball tournament, and his dismissal prompted a demonstration by over 500 students.

=== Milwaukee Bucks (1974–1976) ===
McKinney was an assistant coach with the Milwaukee Bucks from 1974 to 1976.

=== Portland Trail Blazers (1976–1979) ===
McKinney was an assistant coach with the Portland Trail Blazers, and won an NBA championship with the Trail Blazers under Ramsay in 1976–77. Ramsay called McKinney the architect of the offense and his wife Claire said McKinney considered his tenure with the Blazers the highlight of his career.

=== Los Angeles Lakers (1979) ===
McKinney received his first NBA head coaching job in 1979–80 with the Lakers. Owner Jerry Buss, who had recently acquired the team, wanted games to be entertaining, and hired the coach to install a running offense. McKinney had 6-foot-9-inch (2.06 m) rookie Magic Johnson, who some thought should play forward, be a point guard, even though incumbent Norm Nixon was already one of the best in the league.

On November 8, 1979, the Lakers were 9–4 after 13 games, when McKinney suffered a near fatal head injury after falling while bicycling. Assistant coach Paul Westhead, who also worked under McKinney at St. Joseph's, was named the interim head coach. However, the length of the recovery and lingering doubts about the complete return of McKinney's mental faculties, combined with the team's level of success under Westhead, ultimately meant that McKinney would never get the chance to return to the job. Westhead continued to use McKinney's offense, a creative and spontaneous offense that came to be known as Showtime, and the team finished the season with a record of 60–22. The Lakers advanced to that year's NBA Finals, when McKinney was fired mid-series on May 13, 1980. The Lakers won the series for their first of five NBA titles in nine seasons, and hired Westhead to permanently replace McKinney.

Pat Riley, who replaced Westhead as Lakers coach, won four titles with the team and became the coach most synonymous with the Showtime Lakers. However, Norm Nixon credited McKinney with creating Showtime. "That should never be forgotten," said Nixon. According to Riley, McKinney "might have won five or six titles for the Lakers in the '80s" were it not for his accident. McKinney was deferential. "I just put in some ideas that were accepted, and the rest was up to Paul and Pat and some great players," he said.

=== Indiana Pacers (1980–1984) ===
McKinney joined the Indiana Pacers the following season in 1980–81. He was hired at the recommendation of a guilt-ridden Buss, who was a business partner with Pacers owner Frank Mariani. In his first season, McKinney was named the NBA Coach of the Year after leading the Pacers to their first playoff appearance since the former American Basketball Association (ABA) team joined the NBA during the ABA–NBA merger of 1976. Over the next three seasons, however, the team's performance regressed, and McKinney was fired after the Pacers posted the league's worst record in the 1983–84 season.

=== Kansas City Kings (1984) ===
McKinney was soon hired as the head coach of the Kansas City Kings, but resigned from the position on November 18, 1984, after the team started with a 1–8 record in the 1984–85 season. He left coaching for good afterwards, citing ongoing issues with his memory, plus no longer feeling passionate about the profession.

== Post-coaching career ==
After he left coaching, McKinney relocated back to his native Pennsylvania with his family. He worked as a sales representative for a major sporting goods company, while also filling in at times as a color analyst for the Philadelphia 76ers broadcasts. He said he got offers to come back to coaching, but never took any of them. Eventually, he and his wife retired to Florida.

In 2005, McKinney co-authored a book about his experiences at Saint Joseph's and donated 10 percent of its proceeds to the school.

== Personal life ==
McKinney died on September 25, 2018, at a hospice in Bonita Springs, Florida, at the age of 83.

McKinney was portrayed by Tracy Letts in the HBO documentary series Winning Time: The Rise of the Lakers Dynasty.

== Head coaching record ==
=== College ===
Record table
Season	Team	Overall	Conference	Standing	Postseason
Philadelphia Textile Rams () (1965–1966)
1965–66	Philadelphia Textile	21–6			NCAA College Division Second Round
Philadelphia Textile:		21–6 (.778)			
Saint Joseph's Hawks (Middle Atlantic Conference) (1966–1974)
1966–67	Saint Joseph's	16–10	4–1		
1967–68	Saint Joseph's	17–9	3–2		
1968–69	Saint Joseph's	17–11	3–2		NCAA University Division First Round
1969–70	Saint Joseph's	13–12	5–0	1st	
1970–71	Saint Joseph's	19–9	6–0	1st	NCAA University Division First Round
1971–72	Saint Joseph's	16–9	5–1	2nd	
1972–73	Saint Joseph's	22–6	6–0	1st	NCAA University Division First Round
1973–74	Saint Joseph's	19–11	5–1	T–1st	NCAA Division I First Round
Saint Joseph's:		142–77 (.648)	37–7 (.841)		
Total:		163–83 (.663)			
National champion Postseason invitational champion Conference regular season champion Conference regular season and conference tournament champion Division regular season champion Division regular season and conference tournament champion Conference tournament champion

=== NBA ===
Legend
Regular season	G	Games coached	W	Games won	L	Games lost	W–L %	Win–loss %
Playoffs	PG	Playoff games	PW	Playoff wins	PL	Playoff losses	PW–L %	Playoff win–loss %

Team	Year	G	W	L	W–L%	Finish	PG	PW	PL	PW–L%	Result
Los Angeles	1979–80	14	10	4	.714	1st in Pacific	—	—	—	—	Replaced by Paul Westhead
Indiana	1980–81	82	44	38	.537	3rd in Central	2	0	2	.000	Lost in first round
Indiana	1981–82	82	35	47	.427	4th in Central	—	—	—	—	Missed playoffs
Indiana	1982–83	82	20	62	.244	6th in Central	—	—	—	—	Missed playoffs
Indiana	1983–84	82	26	56	.317	6th in Central	—	—	—	—	Missed playoffs
Kansas City	1984–85	9	1	8	.111	(resigned)	—	—	—	—	—
Career		351	136	215	.387		2	0	2	.000	

== Publications ==
- Jack McKinney with Robert Gordon, Jack McKinney's Tales from the Saint Joseph's Hardwood: The Hawk will Never Die, Sports Publishing (2005) ISBN 1-58261-929-8
