= 1980–81 San Diego Clippers season =

NBA professional basketball team season

- Head coach: Paul Silas
- Arena: San Diego Sports Arena

Results
- Record: 36–46 (.439)
- Place: Division: 5th (Pacific); Conference: 9th (Western)
- Playoff finish: Did not qualify
- Stats at Basketball Reference

Local media
- Television: XETV
- Radio: KOGO

The 1980–81 San Diego Clippers season was the Clippers' 11th season in the NBA and their 3rd season in the city of San Diego.

== Draft picks ==
Round	Pick	Player	Position	Nationality	School/Club team
1	9	Michael Brooks	Forward	United States	LaSalle
4	76	Ed Odom	Guard	United States	Oklahoma State
5	99	Wally Rank	Forward	United States	San Jose State
6	122	Londale Theus	Guard	United States	Santa Clara
7	145	Paul Anderson	Guard	United States	Southern California College

== Roster ==
1980–81 San Diego Clippers roster
Players

Pos.	No.	Player	Height	Weight	DOB	From
G	10	Henry Bibby	6 ft 1 in (1.85 m)	185 lb (84 kg)		UCLA
F	7	Michael Brooks	6 ft 7 in (2.01 m)	220 lb (100 kg)		La Salle
F	23	Joe Bryant	6 ft 7 in (2.01 m)	215 lb (98 kg)		Penn
G	42	Ron Davis	6 ft 6 in (1.98 m)	198 lb (90 kg)		Washington State
F	24	Gar Heard	6 ft 6 in (1.98 m)	220 lb (100 kg)		Oklahoma
C	31	Swen Nater	6 ft 11 in (2.11 m)	240 lb (109 kg)		UCLA
G	22	Stan Pietkiewicz	6 ft 5 in (1.96 m)	200 lb (91 kg)		Auburn
G	34	Tony Price	6 ft 6 in (1.98 m)	190 lb (86 kg)		Penn
F	30	Wally Rank	6 ft 6 in (1.98 m)	220 lb (100 kg)		San José State
G	11	Phil Smith	6 ft 4 in (1.93 m)	197 lb (89 kg)		San Francisco
G	14	Brian Taylor	6 ft 2 in (1.88 m)	185 lb (84 kg)		Princeton
C	33	Jerome Whitehead	6 ft 10 in (2.08 m)	220 lb (100 kg)		Marquette
C	32	Bill Walton (injured)	6 ft 11 in (2.11 m)	235 lb (107 kg)		UCLA
F	21	Sidney Wicks	6 ft 9 in (2.06 m)	225 lb (102 kg)		UCLA
G	20	Freeman Williams	6 ft 4 in (1.93 m)	185 lb (84 kg)		Portland State

Coaches
Head coach
- Paul Silas
Assistant(s)
- Pete Babcock
- Bill Westphal

Legend
- (DP) Unsigned draft pick
- (FA) Free agent
- (S) Suspended
- Injured

=== Roster notes ===
- Center Bill Walton missed the entire season due to a left foot injury.
- This is Gar Heard's second tour of duty with the franchise. He previously played for the Buffalo Braves from 1973 to 1976.

== Regular season ==
=== Season standings ===
Pacific Division	W	L	PCT	GB	Home	Road	Div
y-Phoenix Suns	57	25	.695	–	36–5	21–20	22–8
x-Los Angeles Lakers	54	28	.659	3.0	30–11	24–17	19–11
x-Portland Trail Blazers	45	37	.549	12.0	30–11	15–26	18–12
Golden State Warriors	39	43	.476	18.0	26–15	13–28	10–20
San Diego Clippers	36	46	.439	21.0	22–19	14–27	14–16
Seattle SuperSonics	34	48	.415	23.0	22–19	12–29	7–23

#	Western Conference				
#	Team	W	L	PCT	GB
1	c-Phoenix Suns	57	25	.695	–
2	y-San Antonio Spurs	52	30	.634	5
3	x-Los Angeles Lakers	54	28	.659	3
4	x-Portland Trail Blazers	45	37	.549	12
5	x-Kansas City Kings	40	42	.488	17
6	x-Houston Rockets	40	42	.488	17
7	Golden State Warriors	39	43	.476	18
8	Denver Nuggets	37	45	.451	20
9	San Diego Clippers	36	46	.439	21
10	Seattle SuperSonics	34	48	.415	23
11	Utah Jazz	28	54	.341	29
12	Dallas Mavericks	15	67	.183	42

Notes

- z, y – division champions
- x – clinched playoff spot

== Player statistics ==
Legend
GP	Games played	GS	Games started	MPG	Minutes per game
FG%	Field-goal percentage	3P%	3-point field-goal percentage	FT%	Free-throw percentage
RPG	Rebounds per game	APG	Assists per game	SPG	Steals per game
BPG	Blocks per game	PPG	Points per game

Player	GP	MPG	FG%	3FG%	FT%	RPG	APG	SPG	BPG	PPG
Swen Nater	82	34.3	.553		.795	12.4	2.4	0.6	0.6	15.6
Phil Smith	76	31.3	.491	.222	.757	2.1	4.9	1.1	0.2	16.8
Michael Brooks	82	30.2	.479	.000	.706	5.4	2.5	1.2	0.4	14.7
Brian Taylor	80	28.9	.525	.383	.789	1.9	5.5	1.5	0.3	10.1
Joe Bryant	82	28.8	.479	.133	.791	5.4	2.3	0.9	0.4	11.6
Freeman Williams	82	24.1	.465	.340	.852	1.6	2.0	1.1	0.1	19.3
Sidney Wicks	49	22.1	.437	.000	.507	4.6	2.3	0.8	0.8	6.7
Gar Heard	78	20.9	.376	.000	.782	4.5	1.6	1.3	0.9	4.8
Henry Bibby	73	15.2	.386	.337	.684	1.0	2.7	0.6	0.0	4.6
Jerome Whitehead	38	14.8	.475	.000	.511	4.8	0.6	0.4	0.2	4.1
Ron Davis	64	12.8	.443	.250	.595	1.9	0.7	0.6	0.2	5.8
Wally Rank	25	6.1	.368		.464	1.2	0.7	0.3	0.0	2.2
Tony Price	5	5.8	.286			0.0	0.6	0.4	0.2	0.8
Stan Pietkiewicz	6	5.0	.400			0.2	0.3	0.0	0.0	0.7

== Awards, records and milestones ==
=== Awards ===
- Guard Brian Taylor led the league in 3-point field goal percentage this season at .383 (44/115)

== Transactions ==
The Clippers were involved in the following transactions during the 1980–81 season.

=== Trades ===
August 28, 1980
October 14, 1980
To San Diego Clippers

- Phil Smith & 1984 first-round draft pick
To San Diego Clippers

- The right to sign Gar Heard as a veteran free agent
To Golden State Warriors

- World B. Free
To Phoenix Suns

- 1981 3rd round draft pick & 1983 3rd round draft pick as compensation

=== Free agents ===
==== Additions ==== : Player / Signed / Former team	==== Subtractions ==== : Player / Left / New team
