= 1980–81 NBA season =

35th NBA season

- League: National Basketball Association
- Sport: Basketball
- Duration: October 10, 1980 – March 29, 1981; March 31 – May 3, 1981 (Playoffs); May 5–14, 1981 (Finals)
- Teams: 23
- TV partner(s): CBS, USA

Draft
- Top draft pick: Joe Barry Carroll
- Picked by: Golden State Warriors

Regular season
- Top seed: Boston Celtics
- Season MVP: Julius Erving (Philadelphia)
- Top scorer: Adrian Dantley (Utah)

Playoffs
- Eastern champions: Boston Celtics
- Eastern runners-up: Philadelphia 76ers
- Western champions: Houston Rockets
- Western runners-up: Kansas City Kings

Finals
- Champions: Boston Celtics
- Runners-up: Houston Rockets
- Finals MVP: Cedric Maxwell (Boston)

NBA seasons
- ← 1979–80 1981–82 →

The 1980–81 NBA season was the 35th season of the National Basketball Association. The season ended with the Boston Celtics winning the NBA championship, beating the Houston Rockets 4 games to 2 in the NBA Finals.

== Notable occurrences ==
- The Dallas Mavericks become the league's 23rd franchise. As a result, the NBA realigns four of its teams to better reflect their geographical locations (the Milwaukee Bucks and Chicago Bulls move to the Eastern Conference and the San Antonio Spurs and Houston Rockets to the Western Conference), finishing a process of geographic realignment that began in the 1978–79 season.
- The 1981 NBA All-Star Game was played at the Richfield Coliseum near Cleveland, Ohio, with the East defeating the West 123–120. Nate Archibald of the Boston Celtics wins the game's MVP award.
- To date, this was the final time that a regular-season had ended during the month of March.
- The Houston Rockets (40–42) become just the second team in NBA history (to date) to make the finals without posting a winning record during the regular season. The Kansas City Kings, their opponents in the Western Conference finals, also posted a 40–42 record.
- It was the final season for Hall of Famers Rudy Tomjanovich, (Note: Inducted into the Hall of Fame as a coach.) Wes Unseld, and Jo Jo White.

Coaching changes
Offseason
Team	1979–80 coach	1980–81 coach
Cleveland Cavaliers	Stan Albeck	Bill Musselman
Dallas Mavericks	Expansion	Dick Motta
Detroit Pistons	Richie Adubato	Scotty Robertson
Golden State Warriors	Johnny Bach	Al Attles
Indiana Pacers	Bobby Leonard	Jack McKinney
San Antonio Spurs	Bob Bass	Stan Albeck
San Diego Clippers	Gene Shue	Paul Silas
Washington Bullets	Dick Motta	Gene Shue
In-season
Team	Outgoing coach	Incoming coach
Atlanta Hawks	Hubie Brown	Mike Fratello
Cleveland Cavaliers	Bill Musselman	Don Delaney
Denver Nuggets	Donnie Walsh	Doug Moe
New Jersey Nets	Kevin Loughery	Bob MacKinnon

== Final standings ==
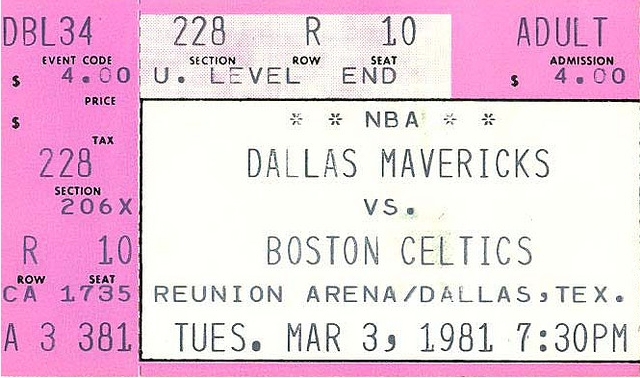
A ticket for a March 1981 game between the Dallas Mavericks and the season's eventual champions Boston Celtics.

=== By division ===
Atlantic Division	W	L	PCT	GB	Home	Road	Div
y-Boston Celtics	62	20	.756	–	35–6	27–14	19–5
x-Philadelphia 76ers	62	20	.756	–	37–4	25–16	15–9
x-New York Knicks	50	32	.610	12.0	28–13	22–19	14–10
Washington Bullets	39	43	.476	23.0	26–15	13–28	8–16
New Jersey Nets	24	58	.293	38.0	16–25	8–33	8–16

Central Division	W	L	PCT	GB	Home	Road	Div
y-Milwaukee Bucks	60	22	.732	–	34–7	26–15	23–7
x-Chicago Bulls	45	37	.549	15.0	26–15	19–22	20–9
x-Indiana Pacers	44	38	.537	16.0	27–14	17–24	17–12
Atlanta Hawks	31	51	.378	29.0	20–21	11–30	9–21
Cleveland Cavaliers	28	54	.341	32.0	20–21	8–33	9–21
Detroit Pistons	21	61	.256	39.0	14–27	7–34	9–21

Midwest Division	W	L	PCT	GB	Home	Road	Div
y-San Antonio Spurs	52	30	.634	–	34–7	18–23	21–9
x-Kansas City Kings	40	42	.488	12.0	24–17	16–25	19–11
x-Houston Rockets	40	42	.488	12.0	25–16	15–26	19–11
Denver Nuggets	37	45	.451	15.0	23–18	14–27	13–17
Utah Jazz	28	54	.341	24.0	20–21	8–33	13–17
Dallas Mavericks	15	67	.183	37.0	11–30	4–37	5–25

Pacific Division	W	L	PCT	GB	Home	Road	Div
y-Phoenix Suns	57	25	.695	–	36–5	21–20	22–8
x-Los Angeles Lakers	54	28	.659	3.0	30–11	24–17	19–11
x-Portland Trail Blazers	45	37	.549	12.0	30–11	15–26	18–12
Golden State Warriors	39	43	.476	18.0	26–15	13–28	10–20
San Diego Clippers	36	46	.439	21.0	22–19	14–27	14–16
Seattle SuperSonics	34	48	.415	23.0	22–19	12–29	7–23

=== By conference ===
#	Eastern Conference				
#	Team	W	L	PCT	GB
1	z-Boston Celtics	62	20	.756	–
2	y-Milwaukee Bucks	60	22	.732	2
3	x-Philadelphia 76ers	62	20	.756	–
4	x-New York Knicks	50	32	.610	12
5	x-Chicago Bulls	45	37	.549	17
6	x-Indiana Pacers	44	38	.537	18
7	Washington Bullets	39	43	.476	23
8	Atlanta Hawks	31	51	.378	31
9	Cleveland Cavaliers	28	54	.341	34
10	New Jersey Nets	24	58	.293	38
11	Detroit Pistons	21	61	.256	41

#	Western Conference				
#	Team	W	L	PCT	GB
1	c-Phoenix Suns	57	25	.695	–
2	y-San Antonio Spurs	52	30	.634	5
3	x-Los Angeles Lakers	54	28	.659	3
4	x-Portland Trail Blazers	45	37	.549	12
5	x-Kansas City Kings	40	42	.488	17
6	x-Houston Rockets	40	42	.488	17
7	Golden State Warriors	39	43	.476	18
8	Denver Nuggets	37	45	.451	20
9	San Diego Clippers	36	46	.439	21
10	Seattle SuperSonics	34	48	.415	23
11	Utah Jazz	28	54	.341	29
12	Dallas Mavericks	15	67	.183	42

Notes

- z – Clinched home court advantage for the entire playoffs and first round bye
- c – Clinched home court advantage for the conference playoffs and first round bye
- y – Clinched division title and first round bye
- x – Clinched playoff spot

== Playoffs ==
Teams in bold advanced to the next round. The numbers to the left of each team indicate the team's seeding in its conference, and the numbers to the right indicate the number of games the team won in that round. The division champions are marked by an asterisk. Home court advantage does not necessarily belong to the higher-seeded team, but instead the team with the better regular season record; teams enjoying the home advantage are shown in italics. Note that in the Western Conference, the lower seeded team won every series.

First Round
E4	New York	0
**E5**	**Chicago**	**2**
**E3**	**Philadelphia**	**2**
E6	Indiana	0
W4	Portland	1
**W5**	**Kansas City**	**2**
W3	Los Angeles	1
**W6**	**Houston**	**2**

Conference Semifinals
**E1**	**Boston***	**4**
E5	Chicago	0
**Eastern Conference**
**E3**	**Philadelphia**	**4**
E2	Milwaukee*	3
W1	Phoenix*	3
**W5**	**Kansas City**	**4**
**Western Conference**
**W6**	**Houston**	**4**
W2	San Antonio*	3

Conference Finals
**E1**	**Boston***	**4**
E3	Philadelphia	3
W5	Kansas City	1
**W6**	**Houston**	**4**

NBA Finals
**E1**	**Boston***	**4**
W6	Houston	2

- * Division winner
- **Bold** Series winner
- Italic Team with home-court advantage

== Statistics leaders ==
Category	Player	Team	Stat
Points per game	Adrian Dantley	Utah Jazz	30.7
Rebounds per game	Moses Malone	Houston Rockets	14.8
Assists per game	Kevin Porter	Washington Bullets	9.1
Steals per game	Magic Johnson	Los Angeles Lakers	3.43
Blocks per game	George Johnson	San Antonio Spurs	3.39
FG%	Artis Gilmore	Chicago Bulls	.670
FT%	Calvin Murphy	Houston Rockets	.958
3FG%	Brian Taylor	San Diego Clippers	.383

== NBA awards ==
- Most Valuable Player: Julius Erving, Philadelphia 76ers
- Rookie of the Year: Darrell Griffith, Utah Jazz
- Coach of the Year: Jack McKinney, Indiana Pacers

- All-NBA First Team:
  - F – Larry Bird, Boston Celtics
  - F – Julius Erving, Philadelphia 76ers
  - C – Kareem Abdul-Jabbar, Los Angeles Lakers
  - G – Dennis Johnson, Phoenix Suns
  - G – George Gervin, San Antonio Spurs
- All-NBA Second Team:
  - F – Marques Johnson, Milwaukee Bucks
  - F – Adrian Dantley, Utah Jazz
  - C – Moses Malone, Houston Rockets
  - G – Otis Birdsong, Kansas City Kings
  - G – Nate Archibald, Boston Celtics

- All-NBA Rookie Team:
  - Kelvin Ransey, Portland Trail Blazers
  - Darrell Griffith, Utah Jazz
  - Larry Smith, Golden State Warriors
  - Kevin McHale, Boston Celtics
  - Joe Barry Carroll, Golden State Warriors

- NBA All-Defensive First Team:
  - Bobby Jones, Philadelphia 76ers
  - Caldwell Jones, Philadelphia 76ers
  - Kareem Abdul-Jabbar, Los Angeles Lakers
  - Dennis Johnson, Phoenix Suns
  - Micheal Ray Richardson, New York Knicks
- NBA All-Defensive Second Team:
  - Dan Roundfield, Atlanta Hawks
  - Kermit Washington, Portland Trail Blazers
  - George Johnson, San Antonio Spurs
  - Quinn Buckner, Milwaukee Bucks
  - Dudley Bradley, Indiana Pacers (tie)
  - Michael Cooper, Los Angeles Lakers (tie)

=== Players of the week ===
Week	Player
Oct. 10 – Oct. 19	Adrian Dantley (Utah Jazz) (1/1)
Oct. 20 – Oct. 26	Otis Birdsong (Kansas City Kings) (1/1)
Oct. 27 – Nov. 02	David Thompson (Denver Nuggets) (1/1)
Nov. 03 – Nov. 09	Elvin Hayes (Washington Bullets) (1/1)
Nov. 10 – Nov. 16	Billy Knight (Indiana Pacers) (1/1)
Nov. 17 – Nov. 23	Artis Gilmore (Chicago Bulls) (1/1)
Nov. 24 – Nov. 30	Robert Parish (Boston Celtics) (1/1)
Dec. 01 – Dec. 07	Mike Dunleavy (Houston Rockets) (1/1)
Dec. 08 – Dec. 14	Dan Roundfield (Atlanta Hawks) (1/1)
Dec. 15 – Dec. 21	Kareem Abdul-Jabbar (Los Angeles Lakers) (1/1)
Dec. 22 – Dec. 28	Dennis Johnson (Phoenix Suns) (1/1)
Dec. 29 – Jan. 04	Bernard King (Golden State Warriors) (1/1)
Jan. 05 – Jan. 11	Nate Archibald (Boston Celtics) (1/1)
Jan. 12 – Jan. 18	Julius Erving (Philadelphia 76ers) (1/1)
Jan. 19 – Jan. 25	Phil Ford (Kansas City Kings) (1/1)
Jan. 26 – Feb. 01	Kenny Carr (Cleveland Cavaliers) (1/1)
Feb. 02 – Feb. 08	Caldwell Jones (Philadelphia 76ers) (1/1)
Feb. 09 – Feb. 15	Mike Newlin (New Jersey Nets) (1/1)
Feb. 16 – Feb. 22	Mike Mitchell (Cleveland Cavaliers) (1/1)
Mar. 02 – Mar. 08	Larry Smith (Golden State Warriors) (1/1)
Mar. 09 – Mar. 15	Moses Malone (Houston Rockets) (1/1)
Mar. 16 – Mar. 22	Michael Ray Richardson (New York Knicks) (1/1)
Mar. 23 – Mar. 29	Robert Reid (Houston Rockets) (1/1)

=== Players of the month ===
Month	Player
October	Magic Johnson (Los Angeles Lakers) (1/1)
November	Julius Erving (Philadelphia 76ers) (1/1)
December	Freeman Williams (San Diego Clippers) (1/1)
January	Bernard King (Golden State Warriors) (1/1)
February	Calvin Murphy (Houston Rockets) (1/1)
March	Kelvin Ransey (Portland Trail Blazers) (1/1)

== See also ==
- List of NBA regular season records
