= Sam Lacey =

American basketball player (1948–2014)

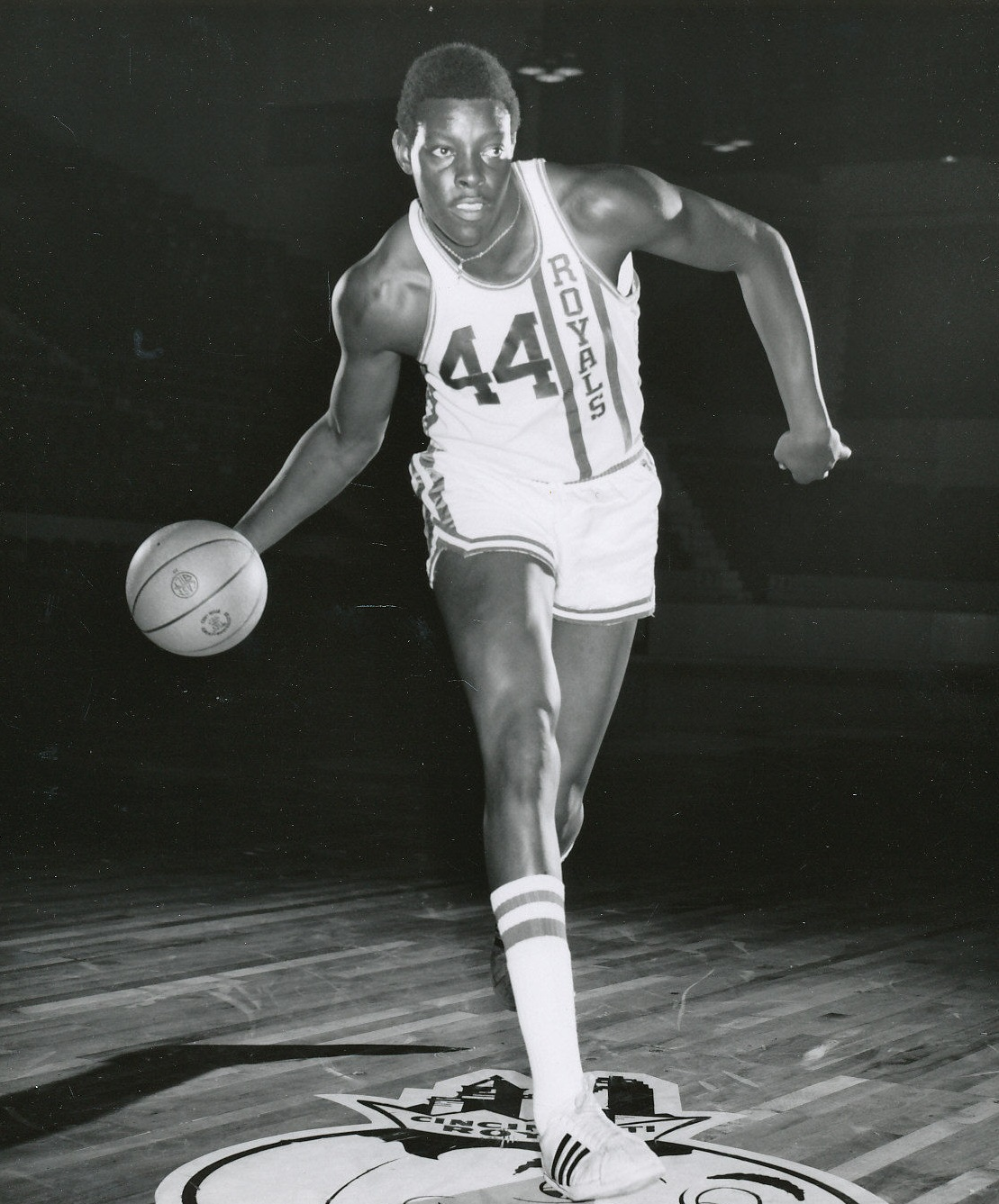
- Lacey in 1971

Personal information
- Born: March 28, 1948 Indianola, Mississippi, U.S.
- Died: March 14, 2014 (aged 65) Kansas City, Missouri, U.S.
- Listed height: 6 ft 10 in (2.08 m)
- Listed weight: 235 lb (107 kg)

Career information
- High school: Gentry (Indianola, Mississippi)
- College: New Mexico State (1967–1970)
- NBA draft: 1970: 1st round, 5th overall pick
- Drafted by: Cincinnati Royals
- Playing career: 1970–1983
- Position: Center
- Number: 44, 40, 52

Career history
- 1970–1981: Cincinnati Royals / Kansas City–Omaha Kings / Kansas City Kings
- 1981–1982: New Jersey Nets
- 1982–1983: Cleveland Cavaliers

Career highlights
- NBA All-Star (1975); No. 44 retired by Sacramento Kings

Career NBA statistics
- Points: 10,303 (10.3 ppg)
- Rebounds: 9,687 (9.7 rpg)
- Blocks: 1,160 (1.5 bpg)
- Stats at NBA.com
- Stats at Basketball Reference
- Collegiate Basketball Hall of Fame

Samuel Lacey Jr. (March 28, 1948 – March 14, 2014) was an American basketball player. He played professionally in the National Basketball Associations (NBA) spending the majority of his 13-year career with the Cincinnati Royals/Kansas City–Omaha Kings/Kansas City Kings franchise. Lacey was selected as an NBA All-Star while playing for the Kings in 1975. The Kings retired his jersey No. 44 shortly after his retirement from the NBA. He is among the top 50 players in NBA history in total rebounds (as of 2025–26).

Lacey was posthumously inducted into the National Collegiate Basketball Hall of Fame in 2024. He played college basketball for the New Mexico State Aggies, where he was a key player in leading the team to three consecutive NCAA University Division basketball tournaments. He averaged 16.3 points and 14.2 rebounds per game over three varsity seasons with the Aggies; and holds the Aggies records for most rebounds in a game, most rebounds and highest rebounding average in a season, and most rebounds in a career (through 2025–26). He received the nickname "Slammin' Sam" for his defensive prowess in shot blocking. In February 2026, the Aggies retired his jersey No. 44, and presented his daughter with Lacey's National Collegiate Basketball Hall of Fame medal.

== Early life ==
Lacey was born on March 28, 1948, in Indianola, Mississippi. His father Samuel Lacy Sr. was a sanitation worker in Indianola. Lacy grew up in a three-bedroom home where he and his two brothers shared one of the rooms, and his sisters shared another. It is reported that he had two brother and two sisters (including brother and sister twins). His parents died within two months of each other in the fall of 1969. Lacey's older sister took in their younger teenage siblings and Lacey used money from his first NBA contract in 1970 to build a new home for them.

Lacey attended Gentry High School in Indianola. Gentry was a segregated school at the time, which did not receive coverage from the local Indianola newspaper (The Enterprise-Tocsin) when Lacey attended and played basketball at Gentry. He set a school basketball scoring record during his playing days there. Lacey was reportedly named MVP of the 1966 Mississippi High School All-Star Game, played in Jackson, Mississippi.

In 1970, Indianola held Sam Lacey Day, including a parade and six to seven thousand attendees, and a speech by the mayor.

== College career ==
Lacey was originally offered a scholarship to attend Jackson State College (now Jackson State University), but after his high school all-star game performance, he drew broader interest beyond Mississippi. Lacey received a scholarship offer from New Mexico State University, which he attended. He was recruited by Ed Murphy, an assistant to head coach Lou Henson. Lacey played college basketball for the New Mexico State Aggies as a 6 ft 9 in (2.06 m) or 6 ft 10 in (2.08 m) 235 lb (106.6 kg) or 240 lb (108.9 kg) center. The Aggies had a combined record of 74–14 during the three seasons Lacey played varsity basketball there (1967 to 1970); and were in the NCAA University Division basketball tournament all three years.

As a freshman, Lacey entered school at 6 ft 9 in (2.06 m) and only 180 pounds (81.7 kg). Lacey averaged 20.2 rebounds per game as a member of the Aggies' freshman basketball team (1966–67); and blocked 16 shots in a single game as a freshman. While at New Mexico State, he earned the nickname "Slammin' Sam" because of his defensive prowess and ability to block shots.

Lacey gained 60 pounds (27.2 kg) between his freshman and sophomore (1967–68) years. As a variously reported 6 ft 10 in 235 lb or 6 ft 9 in 240 lb sophomore center, Lacey averaged a team-leading 15.1 points per game and 11.6 rebounds per game. The Aggies were 23–6 that season, and played in the 1968 NCAA University Division basketball tournament. The Aggies defeated Weber State 68–57 in the first round of the West Regional tournament. Lacey had 20 points and a game-leading 18 rebounds. The Aggies lost in the West Regional semifinals to Kareem Abdul-Jabbar (then more generally known as Lew Alcindor) and eventual national champion UCLA, 58–49; with Lacey scoring only 6 points and gathering five rebounds before fouling out of the game against Abdul-Jabbar.

As a junior (1968–69), Lacey averaged 15.8 points, 15 rebounds, and one assist per game. In December 1968, Lacey was the unanimous selection as MVP of the Evansville Classic tournament; which the Aggies won. During that tournament, he reportedly set a New Mexico State record with 26 rebounds in a single game. The Aggies were 24–5 that season, and played in the 1969 NCAA University Division basketball tournament. The Aggies defeated Brigham Young in the first round of the West Regional tournament, in which Lacey had 16 points, 13 rebounds, and five assists. The Aggies lost to UCLA again, 53–38, in the West Regional Semifinals. Lacey had 11 points and 11 rebounds, to Abdul-Jabbar's 16 points and 16 rebounds. The Associated Press ranked New Mexico State No. 12 at the end of the season (with UCLA again No. 1). Lacey reportedly received a number of All-America honorable mentions in 1969.

Lacey averaged 17.7 points and 15.9 rebounds per game as a senior (1969–70). In the 1970 NCAA University Division basketball tournament, Lacey and All-American star guard Jimmy Collins (24.3 points per game) led the Aggies to their first and only Final Four appearance. The Aggies defeated Rice University, Kansas State University and Drake University to reach the tournament's Final Four, before falling for the third consecutive year to eventual national champion UCLA and legendary coach John Wooden. Lacey had 19 points and 20 rebounds in the win over Rice; 15 points and 11 rebounds against Kansas State; and 20 points and 24 rebounds against Drake. It has been stated that his 24 rebounds against Drake is a New Mexico State single game record, though it was contemporaneously reported that he had 26 rebounds in a game against Tennessee Tech on December 27, 1968.

The Aggies lost to UCLA 93–77. Lacey suffered a foot injury early in the game against UCLA. While he continued to play in the game, he was hampered by the injury and the Aggies were not competitive in the second half. Lacey had eight points and 16 rebounds in 31 minutes. The Aggies did win the third-place game over St. Bonaventure to finish the season 27–3, with Lacey scoring 18 points and grabbing 19 rebounds. The Aggies ended the year ranked No. 5 in the nation by the Associated Press. Lacey earned first-team All-American honors from Basketball Weekly. He was an Associated Press honorable mention for All-American in 1970.

While at New Mexico State, Lacey set team rebounding records for a career, season, and single game. He still holds the Aggie record for rebounds in a game (through 2025–26). Lacey's 1,265 career rebounds is a school record, as are his 1969–70 single season average of 15.9 rebounds per game and 493 total rebounds (through 2025–26). Over his college career, Lacey scored 1,448 points and had 1,265 rebounds, averaging 16.3 points and 14.2 rebounds per game.

== NBA career ==
Lacey was drafted in the first round of the 1970 NBA draft by the Cincinnati Royals, fifth overall. He was also drafted by the New Orleans Buccaneers in the first round of the 1970 American Basketball Association draft. Lacey chose the Royals, playing over ten years for that franchise. In total, he played 13 seasons (1970 to 1983) in the National Basketball Association. He started as a member of the Royals in Cincinnati. The Royals had moved from Rochester to Cincinnati in 1957 and in 1972 moved again, becoming the Kansas City–Omaha Kings; and then became the Kansas City Kings before the 1975-1976 season. Lacey played for both Kansas City incarnations (the same franchise now being the Sacramento Kings). At the end of his career, he played for the New Jersey Nets and Cleveland Cavaliers.

Lacy averaged a double-double in points and rebounds over his first six seasons. As a rookie, in a December 19, 1970 game against the eventual NBA champion Milwaukee Bucks, Lacey came into the game as a reserve center and had 23 points, 11 rebounds, and a number of blocked shots; including three blocked shots against the 7 ft 2 in (2.18 m) future Hall of Fame center Kareem Abdul-Jabbar. In an early February 1971 game against the New York Knicks Lacey had 27 points, 25 rebounds, and eight blocked shots, including three blocks against future Hall of Fame center Willis Reed. Although originally a reserve center as a rookie, Lacey began regularly playing over 30 minutes per game by January 1971, and had four games that season with double-doubles of over 20 points and 20 rebounds in the same game. That season, he averaged 32.7 minutes, 13.5 points, and 11.3 rebounds per game.

Lacey's most productive NBA season arguably came in 1973–74 when he averaged 14.2 points and 13.4 rebounds per game. That year, on November 25, 1973, Lacey grabbed a career best 26 rebounds, including 10 offensive rebounds, along with scoring 20 points and recording six assists, in a 104–99 loss to the Seattle SuperSonics.

In the 1974–75 season, Lacey led the NBA in defensive rebounds per game (11.4), had the league's third leading rebound average (14.2 rebounds per game, behind only Naismith Basketball Hall of Famers Wes Unseld and Dave Cowens), and had the second-most total rebounds (1,149, behind only Hall of Famer Bob McAdoo). He was named an All-Star in 1975, and finished the season averaging 11.5 points, 14.2 rebounds, and 5.3 assists per game. On February 5, 1975, Lacey recorded a career high eight steals during a 90–82 win over the Portland Trail Blazers. He was 10th in NBA Most Valuable Player voting in 1975. The Kings lost to the Chicago Bulls in the 1975 Western Conference semifinals in six games. Lacey averaged 44 minutes, 15.7 rebounds, 9.5 points, five assists, two steals, and 1.5 blocked shots per game during that series. He led the Kings in minutes played, rebounding, and blocks; and was second only to Nate Archibald in assists.

During the 1981 NBA playoffs, Lacey was the Kings' captain and leader and played a key role in the 40–42 five seed Kings making it to the Western Conference finals before being eliminated by Moses Malone and the Houston Rockets. In 15 playoff games, Lacey averaged 35.5 minutes, 10 points, eight rebounds, 5.3 assists, and 1.9 steals per game, for a Kansas City team missing starting guards Phil Ford and Otis Birdsong due to injuries for significant portions of the 1981 Western Conference playoffs.

Lacey led the Kings with 7.7 assists per game in their 1981 Western Conference first-round series win over the Portland Trail Blazers; to go along with 10 points, nine rebounds, 1.3 steals, and 1.3 blocked shots per game. He then led the Kings in rebounding in the seven-game semifinal series win over the Phoenix Suns. In the Western Conference finals he tied Ford in leading the Kings with 5.8 assists per game; and led the team with 2.6 steals and 1.6 blocks per game. Lacey also had to defend against future Hall of Fame center Moses Malone, and had more personal fouls than any other player in that five-game series (23).

During the following season, Lacey was traded to the New Jersey Nets for Mike Woodson and a future first round draft pick. He played in 54 games for the Nets, but only started six games and averaged 12 minutes of playing time per game. The Nets did not renew Lacey's contract after the 1981–82 season. He was signed by the Cleveland Cavaliers in December 1982, during the 1982–83 season. Lacey played the final 60 games of his NBA career with the Cavaliers, starting 33 games and averaging 20.5 minutes, 4.2 points, and 3.9 rebounds per game.

Lacey is one of only five NBA players (along with Hakeem Olajuwon, Julius Erving, David Robinson and Ben Wallace) to have registered 100 blocks and 100 steals in six consecutive seasons. His jersey no. 44 is retired by the Sacramento Kings. He is also one of three NBA players (along with Wes Unseld and Reggie Evans) to total at least 30 rebounds and fewer than 10 points in the first two games of the season.

When Lacey retired in 1983, he had accumulated 9,687 rebounds and a total of 10,303 points; averaging 10.3 points and 9.7 rebounds per game over his career. As a Royal/King, he played in 888 games and averaged a double-double (11.1 points and 10.5 rebounds per game). Lacey ranks 48th overall for total rebounds in NBA history, and 52nd overall among combined ABA/NBA total rebounds (through 2025–26).

== Personal life and death ==
Lacey lived in Kansas City, Missouri after retiring from the NBA. He became a partner in a sports management company. He reportedly moved back to Indianola for some time after his retirement as well. He taught at a summer youth basketball camp in the Indianola area in the 1990s, named in his honor (The Sam Lacey Basketball Camp).

Lacy died in his home in Kansas City on March 14, 2014, at age 65.

== Honors ==
The Kansas City Kings retired his No. 44 jersey shortly after Lacey retired from the NBA. At the time, only three other Royals/Kings' numbers had been retired by the franchise (Maurice Stokes, Oscar Robertson, and Jack Twyman). The Sacramento Kings continue to display his retired jersey number at their arena.

In 2024, Lacey was inducted into the National Collegiate Basketball Hall of Fame. In 1975, he was inducted into the New Mexico State Athletics Hall of Fame. In February 2008, Lacey was among the first inductees into the Aggies Ring of Honor, along with his coach Lou Henson, and Billy Joe Price. In 2015, he became the first New Mexico State basketball player to be inducted into the New Mexico Sports Hall of Fame. On February 21, 2026, New Mexico State posthumously retired his No. 44 during the halftime of a game between the Aggies and UTEP, and recognized his induction into the National Collegiate Basketball Hall of Fame. Lacey's daughter Gretchen Downey accepted the hall of fame medal on his behalf.

=== Statistics ===
Legend
GP	Games played	GS	Games started	MPG	Minutes per game
FG%	Field goal percentage	3P%	3-point field goal percentage	FT%	Free throw percentage
RPG	Rebounds per game	APG	Assists per game	SPG	Steals per game
BPG	Blocks per game	PPG	Points per game	**Bold**	Career high

==== Regular season ====
Year	Team	GP	GS	MPG	FG%	3P%	FT%	RPG	APG	SPG	BPG	PPG
1970–71	Cincinnati	81	–	32.7	.418	–	.687	11.3	1.4	–	–	13.5
1971–72	Cincinnati	81	–	35.0	.422	–	.704	12.0	2.1	–	–	11.6
1972–73	Kansas City–Omaha	79	–	37.1	.474	–	.708	11.8	2.4	–	–	13.5
1973–74	Kansas City–Omaha	79	–	39.3	.476	–	.749	13.4	3.8	1.6	**2.3**	**14.2**
1974–75	Kansas City–Omaha	81	–	**41.7**	.427	–	.754	**14.2**	5.3	**1.7**	2.1	11.5
1975–76	Kansas City	81	–	38.1	.401	–	.759	12.6	4.7	1.6	1.7	12.8
1976–77	Kansas City	**82**	–	31.6	.422	–	.762	9.0	4.7	1.5	1.6	10.6
1977–78	Kansas City	77	–	27.7	.449	–	.717	8.3	3.9	1.6	1.4	8.6
1978–79	Kansas City	**82**	–	32.0	.502	–	.739	8.6	5.2	1.3	1.7	10.6
1979–80	Kansas City	81	–	29.8	.448	.000	.741	8.0	**5.7**	1.4	1.3	9.2
1980–81	Kansas City	**82**	–	27.2	.442	.200	**.786**	7.1	4.9	1.2	1.5	6.9
1981–82	Kansas City	2	1	10.0	**.600**	–	.000	2.0	2.0	1.0	.5	3.0
1981–82	New Jersey	54	6	12.0	.430	.000	.771	1.9	1.4	.4	.7	2.9
1982–83	Cleveland	60	33	20.5	.420	**.222**	.784	3.9	2.0	.5	.4	4.2
Career		1,002	40	31.8	.441	.188	.738	9.7	3.7	1.3	1.5	10.3
All-Star		1	0	17.0	.333	–	1.000	7.0	1.0	2.0	1.0	6.0

==== Playoffs ====
Year	Team	GP	GS	MPG	FG%	3P%	FT%	RPG	APG	SPG	BPG	PPG
1975	Kansas City–Omaha	6	–	**44.0**	.377	–	.611	**15.7**	5.0	2.0	1.5	9.5
1979	Kansas City	5	–	35.2	.381	–	.789	10.2	4.2	1.8	**2.0**	9.4
1980	Kansas City	3	–	33.7	.381	**1.000**	.750	7.3	4.3	**2.3**	.7	6.7
1981	Kansas City	**15**	–	35.5	**.420**	.000	**.857**	8.0	**5.3**	1.9	1.5	**10.0**
Career		29	–	37.0	.401	.250	.776	9.9	5.0	1.9	1.5	9.4

== See also ==
- List of NBA career rebounding leaders
- List of NBA career personal fouls leaders
- List of NBA single-game steals leaders
