= 1980–81 Houston Rockets season =

- Conference champions
- Head coach: Del Harris
- General manager: Ray Patterson
- Owners: George J. Maloof Sr.; Gavin Maloof
- Arena: The Summit

Results
- Record: 40–42 (.488)
- Place: Division: 2nd (Midwest); Conference: 6th (Western)
- Playoff finish: NBA Finals (lost to Celtics 2–4)
- Stats at Basketball Reference

Local media
- Television: KHTV
- Radio: KTRH

The 1980–81 Houston Rockets season saw the team advance to the NBA Finals. The 1981 Rockets were the first team since the 1959 Minneapolis Lakers to make the NBA Finals with a losing record.

In the playoffs, the Rockets defeated the defending NBA champion Los Angeles Lakers in three games in the First Round, then defeated the San Antonio Spurs in seven games in the Semifinals, and the Kansas City Kings in five games in the conference finals, reaching the NBA Finals for the first time in franchise history. In the Finals, they fell to the Boston Celtics in six games.

== Draft picks ==
Round	Pick	Player	Position	Nationality	College/Club team
2	27	John Stroud		United States	Ole Miss
2	38	Terry Stotts		United States	Oklahoma
2	43	Billy Williams		United States	Clemson
4	84	Dean Hunger		United States	Utah State
5	106	Albert Jones		United States	New Mexico
6	130	Everette Jefferson		United States	New Mexico
7	152	Joe Nehls		United States	Arizona
8	173	Rosie Barnes		United States	Bowling Green

== Roster ==
1980–81 Houston Rockets roster
Players

Pos.	No.	Player	Height	Weight	DOB	From
G	10	Mike Dunleavy	6 ft 1 in (1.85 m)	180 lb (82 kg)	––	South Carolina
SF	00	Calvin Garrett	6 ft 7 in (2.01 m)	190 lb (86 kg)	––	Oral Roberts
G	6	Tom Henderson	6 ft 3 in (1.91 m)	190 lb (86 kg)	––	Hawaiʻi
F	11	Major Jones	6 ft 9 in (2.06 m)	225 lb (102 kg)	––	Albany State
G	30	Allen Leavell	6 ft 1 in (1.85 m)	170 lb (77 kg)	––	Oklahoma City
C	24	Moses Malone	6 ft 11 in (2.11 m)	235 lb (107 kg)	––	Petersburg HS (VA)
PG	23	Calvin Murphy	5 ft 9 in (1.75 m)	165 lb (75 kg)	––	Niagara
F/C	5	Billy Paultz	6 ft 11 in (2.11 m)	235 lb (107 kg)	––	St. John's
SF	50	Robert Reid	6 ft 8 in (2.03 m)	205 lb (93 kg)	––	St. Mary's (TX)
F	42	John Stroud	6 ft 7 in (2.01 m)	215 lb (98 kg)	––	Mississippi
F	45	Rudy Tomjanovich	6 ft 8 in (2.03 m)	218 lb (99 kg)	––	Michigan
SF	32	Bill Willoughby	6 ft 8 in (2.03 m)	205 lb (93 kg)	––	Dwight Morrow HS (NJ)

Coaches
Head coach
- Del Harris
Assistant(s)
- Herb Brown
- Carroll Dawson

Legend
- (DP) Unsigned draft pick
- (FA) Free agent
- (S) Suspended
- Injured

== Regular season ==
In the 1980–81 season, after the newly established Dallas Mavericks became the third NBA team in Texas, the NBA restructured the conferences and sent the Rockets, who had previously played in the Eastern Conference, to the Midwest Division of the Western Conference. It was head coach Del Harris's second season, and he led Houston to a 40–42 record. The Rockets tied with the Kansas City Kings for second place in the Midwest Division behind San Antonio. Houston had one game remaining to be played on its regular-season schedule when the team qualified for the playoffs. During the season, point guard Calvin Murphy set two NBA records, both of which had previously been held by Rick Barry. Murphy sank 78 consecutive free throws, to break Barry's mark of 60 set in 1976, and Murphy's season free-throw percentage was .958, breaking Barry's record of .947 set in 1979 (when Barry had been a member of the Rockets).

=== Season standings ===
Midwest Division	W	L	PCT	GB	Home	Road	Div
y-San Antonio Spurs	52	30	.634	–	34–7	18–23	21–9
x-Kansas City Kings	40	42	.488	12.0	24–17	16–25	19–11
x-Houston Rockets	40	42	.488	12.0	25–16	15–26	19–11
Denver Nuggets	37	45	.451	15.0	23–18	14–27	13–17
Utah Jazz	28	54	.341	24.0	20–21	8–33	13–17
Dallas Mavericks	15	67	.183	37.0	11–30	4–37	5–25

#	Western Conference				
#	Team	W	L	PCT	GB
1	c-Phoenix Suns	57	25	.695	–
2	y-San Antonio Spurs	52	30	.634	5
3	x-Los Angeles Lakers	54	28	.659	3
4	x-Portland Trail Blazers	45	37	.549	12
5	x-Kansas City Kings	40	42	.488	17
6	x-Houston Rockets	40	42	.488	17
7	Golden State Warriors	39	43	.476	18
8	Denver Nuggets	37	45	.451	20
9	San Diego Clippers	36	46	.439	21
10	Seattle SuperSonics	34	48	.415	23
11	Utah Jazz	28	54	.341	29
12	Dallas Mavericks	15	67	.183	42

Notes

- z, y – division champions
- x – clinched playoff spot

== Game log ==
=== Regular season ===
1980–81 game log
Total: 40–42 (home: 25–16; road: 15–26)
October: 4–5 (home: 2–2; road: 2–3)

Game	Date	Team	Score	High points	High rebounds	High assists	Location Attendance	Record
1	October 10	@ San Diego	L 104–120				San Diego Sports Arena	0–1
2	October 12	@ Los Angeles	L 103–114				The Forum	0–2
3	October 15	Seattle	W 103–100				The Summit	1–2
4	October 17	@ Portland	W 102–99				Memorial Coliseum	2–2
5	October 18	@ Golden State	L 101–108				Oakland–Alameda County Coliseum Arena	2–3
6	October 21	@ Denver	W 119–117				McNichols Sports Arena	3–3
7	October 23	Kansas City	L 96–105				The Summit	3–4
8	October 25	Detroit	L 109–112				The Summit	3–5
9	October 29	Dallas	W 109–103				The Summit	4–5

November: 7–8 (home: 3–3; road: 4–5)

Game	Date	Team	Score	High points	High rebounds	High assists	Location Attendance	Record
10	November 5	San Diego	L 104–111				The Summit	4–6
11	November 8	Phoenix	L 115–116				The Summit	4–7
12	November 11	@ Dallas	W 105–94				Reunion Arena	5–7
13	November 12	Los Angeles	W 107–104				The Summit	6–7
14	November 14	@ Utah	L 115–117				Salt Palace Acord Arena	6–8
15	November 15	@ Seattle	L 139–143 (OT)				Kingdome	6–9
16	November 18	Seattle	W 138–118				The Summit	7–9
17	November 20	@ Cleveland	W 117–114				Richfield Coliseum	8–9
18	November 21	@ New Jersey	W 116–108				Rutgers Athletic Center	9–9
19	November 22	@ Indiana	L 120–129				Market Square Arena	9–10
20	November 24	@ New York	L 110–113 (OT)				Madison Square Garden	9–11
21	November 26	Philadelphia	L 100–101				The Summit	9–12
22	November 28	@ San Antonio	W 124–115				HemisFair Arena	10–12
23	November 29	Dallas	W 115–90				The Summit	11–12
24	November 30	@ Phoenix	L 114–117				Arizona Veterans Memorial Coliseum	11–13

December: 5–9 (home: 3–3; road: 2–6)

Game	Date	Team	Score	High points	High rebounds	High assists	Location Attendance	Record
25	December 3	Cleveland	W 118–109				The Summit	12–13
26	December 5	@ Kansas City	L 100–108				Kemper Arena	12–14
27	December 6	Denver	W 111–108				The Summit	13–14
28	December 10	Los Angeles	L 108–109				The Summit	13–15
29	December 12	@ Portland	L 100–106				Memorial Coliseum	13–16
30	December 13	@ Golden State	W 99–97				Oakland–Alameda County Coliseum Arena	14–16
31	December 17	San Antonio	L 107–113				The Summit	14–17
32	December 19	@ Boston	L 119–133				Boston Garden	14–18
33	December 20	@ Chicago	L 109–133				Chicago Stadium	14–19
34	December 21	@ Milwaukee	L 91–123				MECCA Arena	14–20
35	December 23	Golden State	L 99–114				The Summit	14–21
36	December 26	@ Detroit	W 114–94				Pontiac Silverdome	15–21
37	December 27	@ Washington	L 97–115				Capital Centre	15–22
38	December 30	San Diego	W 104–98				The Summit	16–22

January: 8–7 (home: 6–3; road: 2–4)

Game	Date	Team	Score	High points	High rebounds	High assists	Location Attendance	Record
39	January 1	Utah	W 117–103				The Summit	17–22
40	January 2	@ Dallas	W 124–120 (OT)				Reunion Arena	18–22
41	January 3	Denver	L 132–134				The Summit	18–23
42	January 7	Kansas City	L 108–114				The Summit	18–24
43	January 9	@ Philadelphia	L 94–107				The Spectrum	18–25
44	January 10	Portland	W 106–105				The Summit	19–25
45	January 14	Chicago	W 109–105				The Summit	20–25
46	January 16	@ Phoenix	L 89–92				Arizona Veterans Memorial Coliseum	20–26
47	January 17	New York	L 98–99				The Summit	20–27
48	January 18	@ Denver	W 98–97				McNichols Sports Arena	21–27
49	January 21	Phoenix	W 106–100				The Summit	22–27
50	January 23	@ Kansas City	L 107–113				Kemper Arena	22–28
51	January 24	Utah	W 106–91				The Summit	23–28
52	January 28	New Jersey	W 111–99				The Summit	24–28
53	January 29	@ Utah	L 97–99				Salt Palace Acord Arena	24–29

February: 9–5 (home: 6–3; road: 3–2)

Game	Date	Team	Score	High points	High rebounds	High assists	Location Attendance	Record
54	February 3	Denver	W 135–128 (OT)				The Summit	25–29
55	February 4	Dallas	W 116–68				The Summit	26–29
56	February 6	@ Phoenix	L 99–112				Arizona Veterans Memorial Coliseum	26–30
57	February 7	Atlanta	W 87–81				The Summit	27–30
58	February 11	San Antonio	W 108–89				The Summit	28–30
59	February 13	Los Angeles	L 105–114				The Summit	28–31
60	February 14	Milwaukee	L 112–117				The Summit	28–32
61	February 19	@ San Diego	L 99–116				San Diego Sports Arena	28–33
62	February 20	@ Los Angeles	W 110–107				The Forum	29–33
63	February 22	@ Seattle	W 111–96				Kingdome	30–33
64	February 23	@ Utah	W 106–102				Salt Palace Acord Arena	31–33
65	February 25	Indiana	W 101–100				The Summit	32–33
66	February 27	Seattle	W 96–92				The Summit	33–33
67	February 28	San Diego	L 103–104				The Summit	33–34

March: 7–8 (home: 5–2; road: 2–6)

Game	Date	Team	Score	High points	High rebounds	High assists	Location Attendance	Record
68	March 1	@ San Antonio	L 86–102				HemisFair Arena	33–35
69	March 4	Boston	L 101–108				The Summit	33–36
70	March 6	Washington	L 104–105				The Summit	33–37
71	March 7	@ Atlanta	L 108–114				The Omni	33–38
72	March 11	Golden State	W 109–92				The Summit	34–38
73	March 13	Portland	W 126–104				The Summit	35–38
74	March 14	Utah	W 101–82				The Summit	36–38
75	March 15	@ Denver	L 127–138				McNichols Sports Arena	36–39
76	March 18	@ Golden State	L 117–118				Oakland–Alameda County Coliseum Arena	36–40
77	March 20	@ Portland	L 103–107				Memorial Coliseum	36–41
78	March 22	@ Kansas City	W 114–108				Kemper Arena	37–41
79	March 24	@ Dallas	W 114–111 (OT)				Reunion Arena	38–41
80	March 25	San Antonio	W 117–111				The Summit	39–41
81	March 27	Kansas City	W 91–84				The Summit	40–41
82	March 29	@ San Antonio	L 109–135				HemisFair Arena	40–42

1980–81 schedule

=== Playoffs ===
1981 playoff game log
First Round: 2–1 (home: 0–1; road: 2–0)

Game	Date	Team	Score	High points	High rebounds	High assists	Location Attendance	Series
1	April 1	@ Los Angeles	W 111–107	Moses Malone (38)	Moses Malone (23)	Allen Leavell (8)	The Forum; 15,517	1–0
2	April 3	Los Angeles	L 106–111	Moses Malone (33)	Moses Malone (15)	Calvin Murphy (8)	The Summit; 16,121	1–1
3	April 5	@ Los Angeles	W 89–86	Moses Malone (23)	Moses Malone (15)	Tom Henderson (7)	The Forum; 14,813	2–1

Conference Semifinals: 4–3 (home: 1–2; road: 3–1)

Game	Date	Team	Score	High points	High rebounds	High assists	Location Attendance	Series
1	April 7	@ San Antonio	W 107–98	Moses Malone (27)	Moses Malone (10)	Reid, Murphy (6)	HemisFair Arena; 13,319	1–0
2	April 8	@ San Antonio	L 113–125	Calvin Murphy (34)	Moses Malone (12)	Robert Reid (10)	HemisFair Arena; 12,128	1–1
3	April 10	San Antonio	W 112–99	Moses Malone (41)	Moses Malone (15)	Reid, Murphy (4)	The Summit; 16,121	2–1
4	April 12	San Antonio	L 112–114	Robert Reid (33)	Moses Malone (9)	Reid, Henderson (6)	The Summit; 16,121	2–2
5	April 14	@ San Antonio	W 123–117	Calvin Murphy (36)	Moses Malone (13)	Tom Henderson (7)	HemisFair Arena; 16,114	3–2
6	April 15	San Antonio	L 96–101	Moses Malone (36)	Moses Malone (10)	Reid, Henderson (7)	The Summit; 16,121	3–3
7	April 17	@ San Antonio	W 105–100	Calvin Murphy (42)	Moses Malone (16)	Tom Henderson (8)	HemisFair Arena; 16,114	4–3

Conference Finals: 4–1 (home: 2–0; road: 2–1)

Game	Date	Team	Score	High points	High rebounds	High assists	Location Attendance	Series
1	April 21	@ Kansas City	W 97–78	Moses Malone (29)	Moses Malone (12)	Mike Dunleavy (6)	Kemper Arena; 13,885	1–0
2	April 22	@ Kansas City	L 79–88	Moses Malone (18)	Moses Malone (15)	Tom Henderson (7)	Kemper Arena; 14,326	1–1
3	April 24	Kansas City	W 92–88	Reid, Paultz (20)	Malone, Paultz (12)	Mike Dunleavy (10)	The Summit; 16,121	2–1
4	April 26	Kansas City	W 100–89	Moses Malone (42)	Moses Malone (23)	Robert Reid (9)	The Summit; 16,121	3–1
5	April 29	@ Kansas City	W 97–88	Moses Malone (36)	Moses Malone (11)	Tom Henderson (6)	Kemper Arena; 14,640	4–1

NBA Finals: 2–4 (home: 1–2; road: 1–2)

Game	Date	Team	Score	High points	High rebounds	High assists	Location Attendance	Series
1	May 5	@ Boston	L 95–98	Robert Reid (27)	Moses Malone (15)	Mike Dunleavy (7)	Boston Garden; 15,320	0–1
2	May 7	@ Boston	W 92–90	Moses Malone (31)	Moses Malone (15)	three players tied (3)	Boston Garden; 15,320	1–1
3	May 9	Boston	L 71–94	Moses Malone (23)	Moses Malone (15)	three players tied (2)	The Summit; 16,121	1–2
4	May 10	Boston	W 91–86	Mike Dunleavy (28)	Moses Malone (22)	Tom Henderson (9)	The Summit; 16,121	2–2
5	May 12	@ Boston	L 80–109	Moses Malone (20)	Moses Malone (11)	Allen Leavell (6)	Boston Garden; 15,320	2–3
6	May 14	Boston	L 91–102	Robert Reid (27)	Moses Malone (16)	Henderson, Reid (5)	The Summit; 16,121	2–4

1981 schedule

== Player statistics ==
Legend
GP	Games played	GS	Games started	MPG	Minutes per game
FG%	Field-goal percentage	3P%	3-point field-goal percentage	FT%	Free-throw percentage
RPG	Rebounds per game	APG	Assists per game	SPG	Steals per game
BPG	Blocks per game	PPG	Points per game

=== Season ===
Player	GP	GS	MPG	FG%	3FG%	FT%	RPG	APG	SPG	BPG	PPG
Moses Malone	80		40.6	.522	.333	.757	14.8	1.8	1.0	1.9	27.8
Calvin Murphy	76		26.5	.492	.235	.958	1.1	2.9	1.5	0.1	16.7
Robert Reid	82		36.1	.482	.000	.756	7.1	4.2	2.0	0.8	15.9
Rudy Tomjanovich	52		24.3	.467	.235	.793	4.0	1.6	0.4	0.1	11.6
Mike Dunleavy	74		21.7	.491	.063	.839	1.6	3.6	0.9	0.0	10.5
Allen Leavell	79		21.3	.471	.118	.832	1.7	4.9	1.2	0.2	8.1
Billy Paultz	81		20.5	.507	.000	.490	4.8	1.3	0.3	0.9	7.4
Bill Willoughby	55		20.8	.523		.766	4.1	1.2	0.3	0.6	6.3
Calvin Garrett	70		23.4	.453	.333	.806	3.8	1.9	0.7	0.1	6.1
Tom Henderson	66		21.4	.413	.000	.821	1.6	4.7	0.8	0.1	5.3

=== Playoffs ===
Player	GP	GS	MPG	FG%	3FG%	FT%	RPG	APG	SPG	BPG	PPG

== Awards and records ==
=== Awards ===
- Moses Malone, All-NBA Second Team

== Transactions ==
=== Trades ===
- October 7, 1980: Traded Paul Mokeski to the Detroit Pistons for a 1982 2nd round draft pick.

== See also ==
- 1980–81 NBA season
