= H. Paul Rosenberg =

- Born: Hermann Paul Rosenberg; August 25, 1924; Las Vegas, New Mexico, U.S.
- Died: November 4, 1990 (aged 66); Kansas City, Missouri, U.S.
- Education: University of Texas (BBA)
- Known for: Owner of Kansas City Kings
- Spouse: Leatrice Cohen (m. 1950)

Hermann Paul Rosenberg (August 25, 1924 – November 4, 1990) was an American businessman who was the president and owner of the Kansas City Kings of the National Basketball Association.

Rosenberg was born on August 25, 1924, in Las Vegas, New Mexico. On October 7, 1945, he married Leatrice Cohen of Hot Springs, Arkansas. He received a Bachelor of Business Administration from University of Texas in 1945. In 1949 he formed the Standard Insurance Agency, which the St. Louis Post-Dispatch alleged was backed by mobster Charles Binaggio and his political associate, George R. Clark. He served as president of the Midland Lithographing Company, a printing company founded by his father. He also served as president of the Union Employers Graphic Arts. In 1973, Roesnberg and Ray Evans led a group that purchased the Kansas City–Omaha Kings from the Jacobs family. Rosenberg served as team president and was the interim general manager during the 1980–81 season. A financial reorganization in 1981 saw Rosenberg, Robert Margolin, and Leo Karosen acquire the team. They following year they sold 50% of the club to B. Gerald Cantor, Irwin Feiner, and Al Steinberg. In 1983 the team was sold to a group from Sacramento, California for $10.5 million. Rosenberg died on November 4, 1990, in Kansas City, Missouri.
