= Alan Tripp =

American entrepreneur

Alan H. Tripp
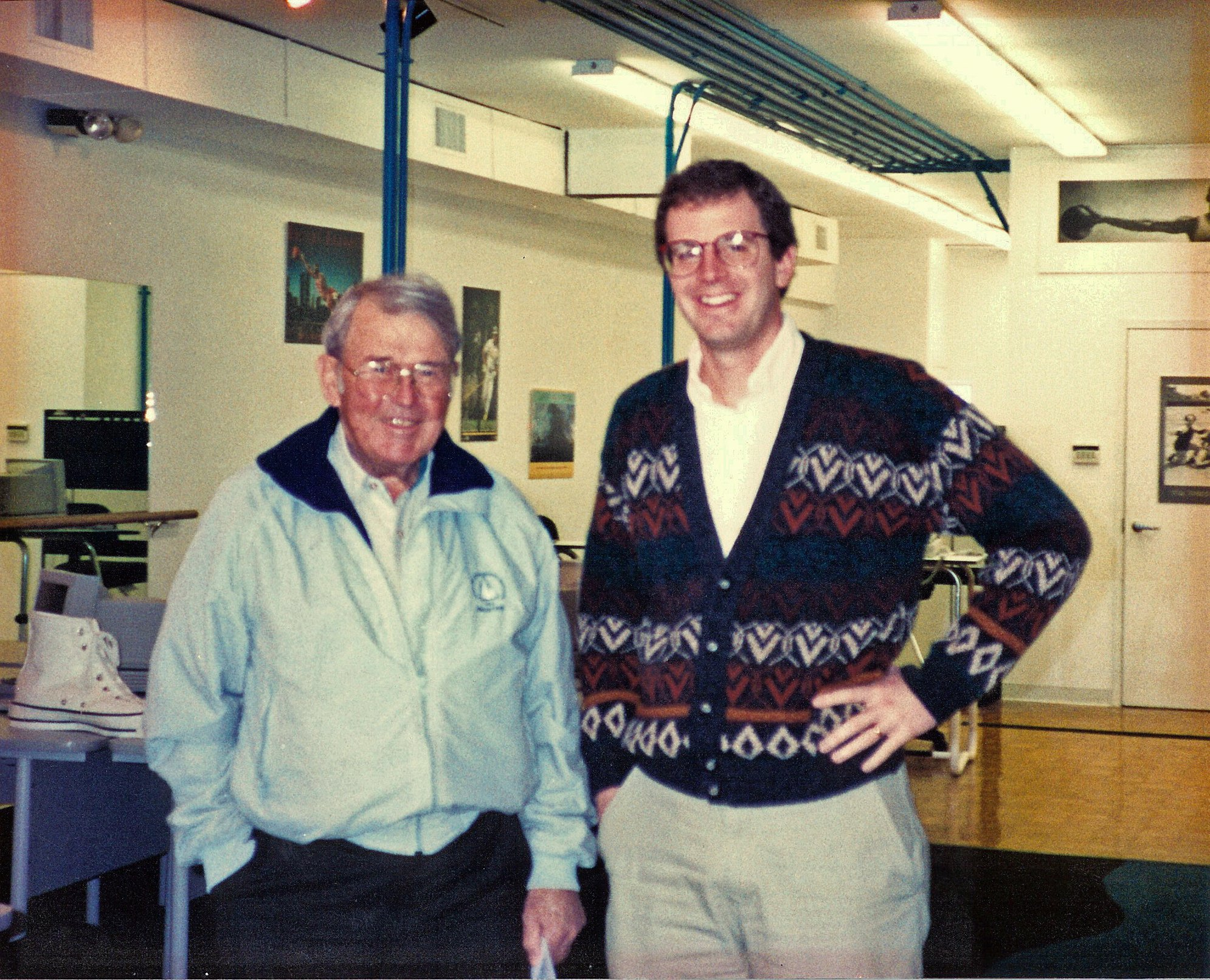
- Alan Tripp (right) in 1993 with William Hewlett, an early mentor and investor in SCORE!
- Born: United States
- Occupations: Founder and CEO of Motimatic

Alan H. Tripp is an American businessman. Tripp founded multiple venture-backed education companies, including SCORE! Educational Centers, InsideTrack, and Motimatic. As of about 2011, he was a regular speaker and contributor to the national discourse on educational technology, motivation and improving student outcomes.

== Entrepreneur ==
In 1992, Tripp launched SCORE!, featuring an adaptive learning system originally developed by Stanford University professor Patrick Suppes for children in kindergarten through seventh grade. On April 17, 1996, SCORE! was acquired by The Washington Post Company. Tripp stayed on as general manager and helped open nearly 100 centers with more than 1,500 employees. More than 1 million students participated in the SCORE! program.

In 2001, Tripp co-founded InsideTrack with Kai Drekmeier. He served as CEO for 12 years and Chairman for 16 years. InsideTrack was acquired by Strada in 2017, at which point the company had served more than 1.5 million students at 1600 university programs.

== Education and business background ==
Tripp received a bachelor's degree in Economics in 1985 and an MBA in 1989, both from Stanford University. He was a management consultant with Boston Consulting Group (BCG) and worked as an analyst for H&Q Technology Partners. He has also worked as a reporter and editor for The Wall Street Journal.

== Lecturer and education industry roles ==
Tripp was appointed as a lecturer at the Stanford Graduate School of Business and the Stanford Graduate School of Education from 1999 to 2004, where he co-taught the core course for education entrepreneurs. He also served as Board Chair of GreatSchools.net from 2004 to 2011 and as Entrepreneur in Residence at Penn State University from 2014 to 2016.

== See also ==
- SCORE! Educational Centers
