= Reggie King =

American basketball player (born 1957)

Personal information
- Born: February 14, 1957 (age 69) Birmingham, Alabama, U.S.
- Listed height: 6 ft 6 in (1.98 m)
- Listed weight: 225 lb (102 kg)

Career information
- High school: Jackson-Olin (Birmingham, Alabama)
- College: Alabama (1975–1979)
- NBA draft: 1979: 1st round, 18th overall pick
- Drafted by: Kansas City Kings
- Playing career: 1979–1986
- Position: Power forward / small forward
- Number: 51

Career history
- 1979–1983: Kansas City Kings
- 1983–1985: Seattle SuperSonics
- 1985–1986: Opel Reggio Calabria
- 1990–1991: Sport Clube Beira-Mar

Career highlights
- 2× Second-team All-American – AP (1978, 1979); Second-team All-American – NABC (1979); 2× SEC Player of the Year (1978, 1979); SEC Male Athlete of the Year (1979); Alabama Mr. Basketball (1975); Second-team Parade All-American (1975)

Career NBA statistics
- Points: 3,898 (8.9 ppg)
- Rebounds: 2,707 (6.2 rpg)
- Assists: 691 (1.6 apg)
- Stats at NBA.com
- Stats at Basketball Reference

Reginald Biddings King (born February 14, 1957) is an American former professional basketball player. Born in Birmingham, Alabama, he was a 6'6" and 225 lb forward and played college basketball for the Alabama Crimson Tide. He had a career in the National Basketball Association (NBA) from 1979 to 1985. King's nickname in college was "the Mule."

King was selected 18th overall by the Kansas City Kings in the 1979 NBA draft. He spent four seasons with the Kings, and his final 2 NBA seasons with the Seattle SuperSonics. His best season was in 1980–81 as a member of the Kings when he averaged a career high 14.9 points, 9.7 rebounds and shot a career-best 54.4% from the field.

As of 2019, King still lives in the Kansas City area.

== Career statistics ==
Legend
GP	Games played	GS	Games started	MPG	Minutes per game
FG%	Field goal percentage	3P%	3-point field goal percentage	FT%	Free throw percentage
RPG	Rebounds per game	APG	Assists per game	SPG	Steals per game
BPG	Blocks per game	PPG	Points per game	**Bold**	Career high

=== NBA ===
==== Regular season ====
Year	Team	GP	GS	MPG	FG%	3P%	FT%	RPG	APG	SPG	BPG	PPG
1979–80	Kansas City	**82**		25.0	.515	.000	.726	6.9	1.3	.8	.4	8.2
1980–81	Kansas City	81		**33.9**	**.544**	–	.684	**9.7**	1.5	**1.3**	**.5**	**14.9**
1981–82	Kansas City	80	**76**	32.6	.509	–	.705	6.5	2.2	1.1	.4	12.1
1982–83	Kansas City	58	5	17.2	.462	–	**.760**	4.1	1.0	.5	.2	4.8
1983–84	Seattle	77	42	27.1	.520	.000	.660	6.1	**2.3**	.7	.3	7.8
1984–85	Seattle	60	5	14.3	.423	–	.695	2.0	.9	.5	.2	2.8
Career		438	128	25.9	.514	.000	.699	6.2	1.6	.8	.3	8.9

==== Playoffs ====
Year	Team	GP	MPG	FG%	3P%	FT%	RPG	APG	SPG	BPG	PPG
1980	Kansas City	3	25.7	.476	–	.556	8.3	1.3	.3	.0	8.3
1981	Kansas City	**15**	**41.3**	**.492**	.000	**.735**	**9.9**	**1.7**	**1.2**	**.7**	**21.3**
1984	Seattle	3	18.2	.417	–	–	3.4	1.2	.4	.6	2.0
Career		23	34.3	.488	.000	.721	8.3	1.5	.9	.6	15.4

== See also ==
- List of NCAA Division I men's basketball players with 2000 points and 1000 rebounds
