= Score! Educational Centers =

American tutoring centers

- Type: Defunct subsidiary of Kaplan, Inc.
- Industry: Service
- Founded: 1992, Palo Alto, California
- Defunct: 2009, Chicago, Illinois, United States
- Key people: Alan Tripp, Founder and CEO; Justin Serrano, President; Rich Kelley, Early CFO
- Products: Specialized education services
- Revenue: Now defunct
- Number of employees: 0

Score! Educational Centers was a United States provider of customized supplementary education and one-on-three tutoring services for children in kindergarten through ninth grade. The company offered materials in multiple subjects, including reading, mathematics, language arts, and writing. It was started as an independent company in 1992 and was purchased by Kaplan, Inc., a subsidiary of Graham Holdings Company, in 1996. In 2009, all Score! centers were closed or converted to Kaplan centers.

At its height, Score! had over 165 centers in twelve states, including California, Colorado, Connecticut, Georgia, Illinois, Maryland, Massachusetts, New Jersey, New York, Pennsylvania, Texas, and Virginia, and also in the District of Columbia, and in Israel.

== Overview ==
Score! employed distinguished and unique methods of helping students meet various academic goals, as described below:

=== Positive reinforcement ===
Score! employed methods of positive reinforcement to help students set and achieve academic goals. After ten-minute computer lessons, called "learning workouts", students obtained Score! cards, small magnetic squares featuring the Score! logo, which were earned for scoring over 70% on a lesson or making basketball shots. Students saved these cards at home or redeemed them for prizes (balls, Disneyland tickets, etc.). Because students spent most of their time at the computer, basketball shots broke up the lessons and allowed students to let out active energy. Shots were awarded for doing well on lessons or completing a full hour of lessons. The Score! coaches also awarded students with high fives. Guided by their Score! coaches, students set long-term goals in an academic subject, measured against national curriculum standards. Students tracked their long-term progress on the "Score! Mountain" located in the learning center—a "goal program that rewards completion, helping students to set and pursue academic goals: students attained bronze, silver, gold, and even 'top of the mountain' goals when they completed a certain number of sessions, advancing them up a wooden mountain to the summit." Positive reinforcement was a strong part of the corporate culture, as documented in Harvard Business School Case Studies in 1999 and 2000.

=== Personalization in educational software ===
By developing a retail business model to deliver educational software for a monthly fee, Score! made available to individual consumers access to a large personalization software system that was originated by Stanford professors, Patrick Suppes and Richard C. Atkinson, and was previously only available to select schools and the Education Program for Gifted Youth. In 1963, IBM had established a partnership with Stanford University's Institute for Mathematical Studies in the Social Sciences (IMSSS), directed by Suppes, to develop the first comprehensive CAI elementary school curriculum which was implemented on a large scale in schools in both California and Mississippi. In 1967 Computer Curriculum Corporation (CCC, now Pearson Education Technologies) was formed to market to schools the materials developed through the IBM partnership. As a student worked on the CCC software, the system learned the user's strengths and weaknesses and created customized lessons based on criterion-referenced testing that produced on a personalized profile for each student. The instructional design, based on automated personalization, was considered innovative in the early 1990s, compared to the traditional classroom model of instruction where students would cover educational material together at the same pace. Based on computer-generated progress reports that CCC measured against national curriculum standards, typical students at Score! who worked for six months, or forty computer-hours, increased the equivalent of approximately two years in a classroom in math or reading.

== History ==
=== Startup years: 1992–1996 ===
Company founder, Alan Tripp, a graduate of Stanford University, opened the first Score! Educational Center in Palo Alto, California, in November 1992, and hired the company's first two Directors, Kai Drekmeier and Ingrid Stabb, who helped Tripp further develop the Score! concept and company culture throughout the startup years. In the summer of 1993, Stabb opened the second center in Menlo Park, California, established profitability for the first time for the Score! center business model, and addressed customer attrition issues in the model by developing Score! Mountain.", the company's first long-term customer loyalty program for the students with a reporting system for their parents. Drekmeier opened the third center in Los Altos, California, beginning a period of rapid growth for the company. Score!'s early success was attributed to personalized educational software provided by Computer Curriculum Corporation (CCC), the corporate culture fueled by energetic Score! coaches, and the loyalty business model. Glenn Tripp, Alan Tripp's brother, joined the company and opened the sixth center, in San Jose, California in 1994. Glen Tripp soon joined the executive management team and helped lead the company to further successes and operational efficiencies. Other professionals who played early leading roles in shaping the start-up company in 1993 and 1994 included (in alphabetical order) Ben Besley, James Cleveland, Gail Derecho, Allison Don, Sarah Hainstock, David Hannigan, Rich Kelley, Thomas Layton, Elizabeth Phythian, and Ann Smith.

After 1995, the company expanded its cadre of center directors and Score! coaches and grew to 19 centers serving thousands of students throughout California. With a chain of prime retail locations secured, the firm sought to increase revenue per center by investing in two new services: Score! Learning Adventures and Personal Academic Tutoring. In 1996 CCC decided not to sign an exclusive licensing agreement with Score! and instead awarded licensing to Kaplan. This limited Score!'s ability to expand, as the initial deal only allowed Alan Tripp to expand to eight more centers. In order to bypass this limit, on 17 April 1996, Kaplan acquired Score! in a deal worth less than US$10 million. In 1999, Tripp went on to found another educational services business, InsideTrack focused on coaching college students.

=== A decade of national expansion: 1997–2006 ===
Once owned by Kaplan, Inc., the company expanded to over 165 locations in eleven states at its height. The division moved its headquarters from San Francisco, CA to Jack London Square in Oakland, CA. By 2005, the learning centers had helped more than 250,000 students since it first opened its doors in Palo Alto, CA. By 2006, the centers served 82,000 students per year. The division headquarters moved again to Chicago, IL.

=== Decline and demise: 2007–2009 ===
In 2007, likely due to continued weak results in revenue, Kaplan made the decision to close 75 Score! centers, nearly half of the total 160 centers as of the end of 2007, eliminating entirely the regions in San Diego, Orange County, Texas, and Georgia among other centers in the remaining regions. The closures were focused primarily on centers that solely offered only one of Score!'s programs (either the Advantage Program or the Personal Academic Tutoring program.) The company restructuring resulted in certain management and terminating certain employees from closed centers. The remaining centers offered both programs to increase revenue opportunities. By the end of the year, Score! operated 80 centers in eight states.

Score revenues declined 41% in the first quarter of 2009, and operating losses at Score increased from $3.7 million in the first quarter of 2008 to $17.6 million in the first quarter of 2009, inclusive of restructuring charges. At the end of March 2009, the Washington Post Company approved a plan to offer tutoring services, previously provided at Score, in Kaplan test prep centers. In conjunction with this plan, 14 existing Score centers will be converted into Kaplan test prep centers and the remaining 64 Score centers will be closed. The plan is expected to be substantially completed by the end of the second quarter of 2009. Washington Post recorded $11.5 million in asset write-downs, severance and accelerated depreciation of fixed assets in the first quarter of 2009, including a $9.2 million write-down on Score's software product. Additional operating losses of approximately $19.2 million are expected to be recorded during the remainder of 2009; these estimated losses are related to the wind-down period of the 64 Score centers to be closed, including $15.0 million related to lease obligations, severance and accelerated depreciation of fixed assets. Poor upper regional management and internal weak structures eventually led to a class action lawsuit for violating labor laws brought on by Score! employees which settled out of court for an undisclosed amount.

== See also ==
- Inquiry education
- Philosophy of education
- Personalization

== References and external sources ==
- Adler, Christine, "New Workbook Series Aims at Avoiding the Academic 'Summer Slide'". NYMetroParents, October 13, 2007.
