= 1980–81 Kansas City Kings season =

NBA professional basketball team season

- Head coach: Cotton Fitzsimmons
- General manager: H. Paul Rosenberg (interim)
- Owners: Leon Karosen; Robert Margolin; H. Paul Rosenberg
- Arena: Kemper Arena

Results
- Record: 40–42 (.488)
- Place: Division: 3rd (Midwest); Conference: 5th (Western)
- Playoff finish: Western Conference finals (lost to Rockets 1–4)
- Stats at Basketball Reference

Local media
- Television: KBMA-TV 41
- Radio: KCKN–AM 1340; KCKN-FM 94.1

The 1980–81 Kansas City Kings season was the Kings 32nd season in the NBA and their ninth season in the city of Kansas City. The Kansas City Kings made the playoffs with a 40–42 win-loss record and appeared in the Western Conference finals where they lost to the also 40–42 Houston Rockets. This is the only time two NBA teams with losing records have made it to the conference finals.

== Draft picks ==
Round	Pick	Player	Position	Nationality	College
1	16	Hawkeye Whitney	SG/SF	United States	North Carolina State
3	62	Tony Murphy	SG	United States	Southern
5	108	Kevin Blakley		United States	Eastern Michigan
6	131	Trent Grooms		United States	Kent State
7	154	Arnold McDowell		United States	Montana State
9	193	Charley Cole		United States	Delta State

== Roster ==
1980–81 Kansas City Kings roster
Players

Pos.	No.	Player	Height	Weight	DOB	From
SG	10	Otis Birdsong	6 ft 3 in (1.91 m)	190 lb (86 kg)		Houston
C	13	Leon Douglas	6 ft 10 in (2.08 m)	230 lb (104 kg)		Alabama
PG	1	Phil Ford	6 ft 2 in (1.88 m)	175 lb (79 kg)		North Carolina
F	22	Gus Gerard	6 ft 8 in (2.03 m)	205 lb (93 kg)		Virginia
SG	20	Ernie Grunfeld	6 ft 6 in (1.98 m)	210 lb (95 kg)		Tennessee
F	51	Reggie King	6 ft 6 in (1.98 m)	225 lb (102 kg)		Alabama
C	44	Sam Lacey	6 ft 10 in (2.08 m)	235 lb (107 kg)		New Mexico State
PF	24	John Lambert	6 ft 10 in (2.08 m)	225 lb (102 kg)		USC
F/C	50	Joe C. Meriweather	6 ft 10 in (2.08 m)	215 lb (98 kg)		Southern Illinois
F	4	Frankie Sanders	6 ft 6 in (1.98 m)	200 lb (91 kg)		Southern
G	11	Lloyd Walton	6 ft 0 in (1.83 m)	160 lb (73 kg)		Marquette
G	15	Scott Wedman	6 ft 7 in (2.01 m)	215 lb (98 kg)		Colorado
G	12	Jo Jo White	6 ft 3 in (1.91 m)	190 lb (86 kg)		Kansas
G	43	Hawkeye Whitney	6 ft 5 in (1.96 m)	235 lb (107 kg)		NC State

Coaches
Head coach
- Cotton Fitzsimmons
Assistant(s)
- Frank Hamblen

Legend
- (DP) Unsigned draft pick
- (FA) Free agent
- (S) Suspended
- Injured

== Regular season ==
=== Season standings ===
Midwest Division	W	L	PCT	GB	Home	Road	Div
y-San Antonio Spurs	52	30	.634	–	34–7	18–23	21–9
x-Kansas City Kings	40	42	.488	12.0	24–17	16–25	19–11
x-Houston Rockets	40	42	.488	12.0	25–16	15–26	19–11
Denver Nuggets	37	45	.451	15.0	23–18	14–27	13–17
Utah Jazz	28	54	.341	24.0	20–21	8–33	13–17
Dallas Mavericks	15	67	.183	37.0	11–30	4–37	5–25

#	Western Conference				
#	Team	W	L	PCT	GB
1	c-Phoenix Suns	57	25	.695	–
2	y-San Antonio Spurs	52	30	.634	5
3	x-Los Angeles Lakers	54	28	.659	3
4	x-Portland Trail Blazers	45	37	.549	12
5	x-Kansas City Kings	40	42	.488	17
6	x-Houston Rockets	40	42	.488	17
7	Golden State Warriors	39	43	.476	18
8	Denver Nuggets	37	45	.451	20
9	San Diego Clippers	36	46	.439	21
10	Seattle SuperSonics	34	48	.415	23
11	Utah Jazz	28	54	.341	29
12	Dallas Mavericks	15	67	.183	42

Notes

- z, y – division champions
- x – clinched playoff spot

== Game log ==
=== Regular season ===
1980–81 game log
Total: 40–42 (home: 24–17; road: 16–25)
October: 5–7 (home: 3–3; road: 2–4)

Game	Date	Team	Score	High points	High rebounds	High assists	Location Attendance	Record
1	October 11	Utah	W 98–91				Kemper Arena	1–0
2	October 12; 8:05 p.m. CDT	@ Phoenix	L 100–109	Birdsong (19)	King (8)	Ford (5)	Arizona Veterans Memorial Coliseum; 10,131	1–1
3	October 14; 7:35 p.m. CDT	@ San Antonio	L 103–109	Birdsong (33)	King (9)	Ford (8)	HemisFair Arena; 9,876	1–2
4	October 15	Los Angeles	L 107–112 (OT)				Kemper Arena	1–3
5	October 17	@ Dallas	W 103–91				Reunion Arena	2–3
6	October 18	Seattle	L 122–127				Kemper Arena	2–4
7	October 21	Golden State	L 111–116				Kemper Arena	2–5
8	October 23; 8:05 p.m. CDT	@ Houston	W 105–96	Birdsong (37)	King (11)	Ford (7)	The Summit; 7,227	3–5
9	October 25	Denver	W 125–122				Kemper Arena	4–5
10	October 28	@ Atlanta	L 109–119				The Omni	4–6
11	October 29	Portland	W 115–98				Kemper Arena	5–6
12	October 31; 6:30 p.m. CST	@ Boston	L 110–115	Birdsong (30)	Lacey (12)	Ford (7)	Boston Garden; 14,035	5–7

November: 5–9 (home: 3–2; road: 2–7)

Game	Date	Team	Score	High points	High rebounds	High assists	Location Attendance	Record
13	November 1; 7:35 p.m. CST	Phoenix	L 100–127	Birdsong (24)	Douglas (8)	Wedman (7)	Kemper Arena; 7,792	5–8
14	November 4	@ Utah	L 104–107				Salt Palace Acord Arena	5–9
15	November 5	New York	W 111–102				Kemper Arena	6–9
16	November 7; 7:05 p.m. CST	@ Philadelphia	L 100–117	Birdsong, Ford (23)	King (13)	Ford (10)	The Spectrum; 11,390	6–10
17	November 8	Cleveland	W 111–106				Kemper Arena	7–10
18	November 11	@ Portland	W 102–101				Memorial Coliseum	8–10
19	November 12	@ Golden State	L 101–111				Oakland–Alameda County Coliseum Arena	8–11
20	November 14	@ Seattle	L 125–127				Kingdome	8–12
21	November 15	@ San Diego	W 96–94				San Diego Sports Arena	9–12
22	November 18	@ Los Angeles	L 94–107				The Forum	9–13
23	November 21	@ Denver	L 121–134				McNichols Sports Arena	9–14
24	November 26	New Jersey	W 118–100				Kemper Arena	10–14
25	November 28	@ Detroit	L 94–104				Pontiac Silverdome	10–15
26	November 29; 7:35 p.m. CST	San Antonio	L 104–106	Birdsong (37)	King (12)	Ford (13)	Kemper Arena; 8,380	10–16

December: 7–8 (home: 4–3; road: 3–5)

Game	Date	Team	Score	High points	High rebounds	High assists	Location Attendance	Record
27	December 2	@ Washington	L 103–107				Capital Centre	10–17
28	December 3; 7:35 p.m. CST	Phoenix	W 103–100	Birdsong (28)	Douglas (8)	Ford (11)	Kemper Arena; 7,719	11–17
29	December 5; 7:35 p.m. CST	Houston	W 108–100	Birdsong (42)	King (9)	Ford (16)	Kemper Arena; 6,982	12–17
30	December 6	@ Indiana	L 88–107				Market Square Arena	12–18
31	December 10	San Diego	W 112–100				Kemper Arena	13–18
32	December 11; 6:35 p.m. CST	@ San Antonio	L 104–122	Birdsong (28)	King, Lacey (6)	Birdsong (10)	HemisFair Arena; 7,491	13–19
33	December 13	Dallas	W 114–107				Kemper Arena	14–19
34	December 16	@ Denver	W 133–118				McNichols Sports Arena	15–19
35	December 17	@ Seattle	L 94–101				Kingdome	15–20
36	December 20	Indiana	L 103–107				Kemper Arena	15–21
37	December 23	@ Cleveland	W 102–100				Richfield Coliseum	16–21
38	December 26; 7:35 p.m. CST	Philadelphia	L 103–113	Ford (19)	King (14)	Ford (10)	Kemper Arena; 16,006	16–22
39	December 27	@ New York	L 99–100				Madison Square Garden	16–23
40	December 28	@ New Jersey	W 102–99				Rutgers Athletic Center	17–23
41	December 30	Golden State	L 104–106				Kemper Arena	17–24

January: 7–6 (home: 4–3; road: 3–3)

Game	Date	Team	Score	High points	High rebounds	High assists	Location Attendance	Record
42	January 2	Utah	W 101–95				Kemper Arena	18–24
43	January 7; 8:05 p.m. CST	@ Houston	W 114–108	Ford (31)	King (11)	Ford (11)	The Summit; 8,220	19–24
44	January 8	Washington	W 136–118				Kemper Arena	20–24
45	January 10	@ Utah	W 99–92				Salt Palace Acord Arena	21–24
46	January 11	San Diego	L 105–115				Kemper Arena	21–25
47	January 14	Portland	L 91–110				Kemper Arena	21–26
48	January 16; 8:00 p.m. CST	@ Milwaukee	L 112–118 (OT)	Wedman (25)	King (9)	Ford (8)	MECCA Arena; 11,052	21–27
49	January 17	Denver	L 122–123				Kemper Arena	21–28
50	January 20	@ Dallas	W 104–91				Reunion Arena	22–28
51	January 21; 7:35 p.m. CST	San Antonio	W 115–108	Ford (32)	Lacey (9)	Wedman (7)	Kemper Arena; 7,627	23–28
52	January 23; 7:35 p.m. CST	Houston	W 113–107	Ford (38)	King (10)	Ford (6)	Kemper Arena; 7,290	24–28
53	January 27	@ San Diego	L 114–119				San Diego Sports Arena	24–29
54	January 29	@ Los Angeles	L 104–118				The Forum	24–30

February: 9–5 (home: 7–1; road: 2–4)

Game	Date	Team	Score	High points	High rebounds	High assists	Location Attendance	Record
All-Star Break
55	February 3	@ Dallas	W 121–100				Reunion Arena	25–30
56	February 4	Detroit	W 91–90				Kemper Arena	26–30
57	February 6	@ Seattle	W 102–92				Kingdome	27–30
58	February 8	@ Portland	L 123–129 (OT)				Memorial Coliseum	27–31
59	February 10; 7:30 p.m. CST	@ Chicago	L 115–116	Birdsong (26)	King (8)	Ford (9)	Chicago Stadium; 4,647	27–32
60	February 11	Utah	W 99–87				Kemper Arena	28–32
61	February 13	Atlanta	W 113–106				Kemper Arena	29–32
62	February 15	Seattle	W 107–105				Kemper Arena	30–32
63	February 18; 7:35 p.m. CST	Boston	W 114–113	Ford (28)	Lacey (10)	Lacey (12)	Kemper Arena; 11,810	31–32
64	February 20; 7:35 p.m. CST	Milwaukee	W 112–109	Birdsong (31)	King (12)	Ford (10)	Kemper Arena; 11,046	32–32
65	February 21	@ Denver	L 109–129				McNichols Sports Arena	32–33
66	February 22	@ Golden State	L 96–104				Oakland–Alameda County Coliseum Arena	33–33
67	February 26	Dallas	W 105–102				Kemper Arena	33–34
68	February 28	Golden State	L 101–110				Kemper Arena	33–35

March: 7–7 (home: 3–5; road: 4–2)

Game	Date	Team	Score	High points	High rebounds	High assists	Location Attendance	Record
69	March 3	Los Angeles	L 98–99				Kemper Arena	33–36
70	March 4; 7:35 p.m. CST	@ San Antonio	W 111–97	Birdsong (39)	Meriweather (10)	Lacey (12)	HemisFair Arena; 9,280	34–36
71	March 5	Portland	W 106–100				Kemper Arena	35–36
72	March 8; 2:05 p.m. CST	Phoenix	W 105–68	Birdsong (30)	King (20)	Grunfeld (12)	Kemper Arena; 8,260	36–36
73	March 10	@ San Diego	W 107–100				San Diego Sports Arena	37–36
74	March 13	@ Los Angeles	L 101–116				The Forum	37–37
75	March 15; 12 Noon CST	Chicago	L 87–97	King (27)	King (16)	Lacey (8)	Kemper Arena; 14,560	37–38
76	March 18	Denver	L 124–126 (2OT)				Kemper Arena	37–39
77	March 20; 7:35 p.m. CST	San Antonio	L 111–114 (OT)	Wedman (25)	King, Lacey (7)	Birdsong (6)	Kemper Arena; 8,740	37–40
78	March 22; 2:05 p.m. CST	Houston	L 108–114	Birdsong (24)	King (15)	Birdsong, Grunfeld, Walton (5)	Kemper Arena; 7,942	37–41
79	March 24	@ Utah	W 105–92				Salt Palace Acord Arena	38–41
80	March 25; 8:35 p.m. CST	@ Phoenix	W 110–101	Grunfeld (25)	Douglas (7)	Grunfeld (12)	Arizona Veterans Memorial Coliseum; 12,660	39–41
81	March 27; 8:05 p.m. CST	@ Houston	L 84–91	King (27)	King (14)	Lacey (7)	The Summit; 15,676	39–42
82	March 29	Dallas	W 113–104				Kemper Arena	40–42

1980–81 schedule

=== Playoffs ===
1981 playoff game log
Western Conference First Round: 2–1 (home: 0–1; road: 2–0)

Game	Date	Team	Score	High points	High rebounds	High assists	Location Attendance	Series
1	April 1	@ Portland	W 98–97 (OT)	Birdsong (29)	King, Lacey (12)	Lacey (10)	Memorial Coliseum; 12,666	1–0
2	April 3	Portland	L 119–124 (OT)	Wedman (31)	Lacey (9)	Lacey (8)	Kemper Arena; 11,088	1–1
3	April 5	@ Portland	W 104–95	King (28)	King (15)	Grunfeld (6)	Memorial Coliseum; 12,666	2–1

Western Conference Semifinals: 4–3 (home: 2–1; road: 2–2)

Game	Date	Team	Score	High points	High rebounds	High assists	Location Attendance	Series
1	April 7; 8:35 p.m. CST	@ Phoenix	L 80–102	King (15)	King (8)	Walton (6)	Arizona Veterans Memorial Coliseum; 12,660	0–1
2	April 8; 8:35 p.m. CST	@ Phoenix	W 88–83	Wedman (24)	King (12)	Grunfeld (8)	Arizona Veterans Memorial Coliseum; 12,660	1–1
3	April 10; 7:35 p.m. CST	Phoenix	W 93–92	King (29)	Lacey (12)	Grunfeld (7)	Kemper Arena; 13,776	2–1
4	April 12; 2:30 p.m. CST	Phoenix	W 102–95	Grunfeld (27)	Lacey (11)	Lacey (10)	Kemper Arena; 11,089	3–1
5	April 15; 8:35 p.m. CST	@ Phoenix	L 89–101	King (29)	Douglas, Lacey (8)	Grunfeld (8)	Arizona Veterans Memorial Coliseum; 12,660	3–2
6	April 17; 7:05 p.m. CST	Phoenix	L 76–81	Wedman (19)	Lacey (12)	Grunfeld (8)	Kemper Arena; 15,232	3–3
7	April 19; 2:30 p.m. CST	@ Phoenix	W 95–88	Grunfeld, King (23)	King, Lacey (7)	Wedman (9)	Arizona Veterans Memorial Coliseum; 12,660	4–3

Western Conference Finals: 1–4 (home: 1–2; road: 0–2)

Game	Date	Team	Score	High points	High rebounds	High assists	Location Attendance	Series
1	April 21; 9:05 p.m. CST	Houston	L 78–97	Grunfeld (20)	King (12)	Ford, Lacey (7)	Kemper Arena; 13,885	0–1
2	April 22; 9:05 p.m. CST	Houston	W 88–79	King (31)	King (10)	King, Lacey (6)	Kemper Arena; 14,326	1–1
3	April 24; 9:00 p.m. CST	@ Houston	L 88–92	King, Wedman (22)	King (8)	Wedman (7)	The Summit; 16,121	1–2
4	April 26; 2:30 p.m. CDT	@ Houston	L 89–100	King (24)	King, Lacey (8)	Ford (10)	The Summit; 16,121	1–3
5	April 29; 9:00 p.m. CDT	Houston	L 88–97	Wedman (20)	King (16)	Lacey (7)	Kemper Arena; 14,640	1–4

1981 schedule

== Player statistics ==
Legend
GP	Games played	GS	Games started	MPG	Minutes per game
FG%	Field-goal percentage	3P%	3-point field-goal percentage	FT%	Free-throw percentage
RPG	Rebounds per game	APG	Assists per game	SPG	Steals per game
BPG	Blocks per game	PPG	Points per game

=== Season ===
Player	GP	MPG	FG%	3FG%	FT%	RPG	APG	SPG	BPG	PPG
Otis Birdsong	71	36.5	.544	.286	.697	3.6	3.3	1.3	0.3	24.6
Scott Wedman	81	35.8	.477	.325	.686	5.3	2.8	1.2	0.6	19.0
Phil Ford	66	34.7	.478	.306	.831	1.9	8.8	1.5	0.1	17.5
Reggie King	81	33.9	.544		.684	9.7	1.5	1.3	0.5	14.9
Sam Lacey	82	27.2	.442	.200	.786	7.1	4.9	1.2	1.5	6.9
Joe Meriweather	74	20.5	.496		.695	5.3	1.0	0.4	1.1	7.6
Ernie Grunfeld	79	20.1	.535		.743	2.6	2.6	0.8	0.2	7.5
Jo Jo White	13	18.2	.439		.611	1.6	2.8	0.8	0.1	6.4
Leon Douglas	79	17.2	.573	.000	.548	4.9	0.9	0.3	0.5	6.0
Hawkeye Whitney	47	16.6	.487	.333	.769	2.3	1.4	1.0	0.1	7.4
Lloyd Walton	61	13.5	.413	.000	.788	0.8	3.4	0.5	0.0	3.4
John Lambert	43	11.0	.406	.000	.783	2.1	0.6	0.3	0.1	3.4
Frankie Sanders	23	8.1 .	442		.909	0.9	0.7	0.7	0.0	3.8
Gus Gerard	16	7.7	.373	.000	.655	1.8	0.4	0.2	0.4	3.6

=== Playoffs ===
Player	GP	MPG	FG%	3FG%	FT%	RPG	APG	SPG	BPG	PPG
Scott Wedman	15	43.8	.434	.281	.714	5.8	3.9	1.2	0.5	20.5
Ernie Grunfeld	15	42.2	.488	.500	.806	0.7	5.9	2.0	0.6	16.8
Reggie King	15	41.3	.492	.000	.735	9.9	1.7	1.2	0.7	21.3
Sam Lacey	15	35.5	.420	.000	.857	8.0	5.3	1.9	1.5	10.0
Phil Ford	5	31.6	.429	.000	.692	1.6	5.8	1.0	0.0	7.8
Otis Birdsong	8	29.3	.571	1.000	.611	2.6	3.4	1.5	0.0	15.5
Leon Douglas	15	21.2	.469		.429	4.3	0.7	0.3	0.2	3.0
Joe Meriweather	10	19.9	.490		.571	3.1	0.5	0.5	0.7	5.6
John Lambert	15	11.7	.407	.000	.833	2.5	0.6	0.3	0.3	3.3
Lloyd Walton	8	9.1	.267	.000	.750	0.9	2.4	0.5	0.0	1.4
Frankie Sanders	9	5.6	.500	.500	1.000	0.6	0.2	0.3	0.0	2.6

== Awards and records ==
- Otis Birdsong, All-NBA Second Team
