= Charles Whitney =

American basketball player

Personal information
- Born: June 22, 1957 (age 69) Washington, D.C., U.S.
- Listed height: 6 ft 5 in (1.96 m)
- Listed weight: 235 lb (107 kg)

Career information
- High school: DeMatha Catholic (Hyattsville, Maryland)
- College: NC State (1976–1980)
- NBA draft: 1980: 1st round, 16th overall pick
- Drafted by: Kansas City Kings
- Playing career: 1980–1982
- Position: Shooting guard / small forward
- Number: 43

Career history
- 1980–1982: Kansas City Kings

Career highlights
- Second-team All-American – USBWA (1980); Third-team All-American – UPI (1980); 2× First-team All-ACC (1979, 1980); Second-team All-ACC (1978); ACC co-Rookie of the Year (1977); Third-team Parade All-American (1976)
- Stats at NBA.com
- Stats at Basketball Reference

Charles "Hawkeye" Whitney (born June 22, 1957) is an American former professional basketball player. After starring at North Carolina State, he was drafted by the Kansas City Kings in the first round of the 1980 NBA draft. A knee injury limited Whitney's professional career to just 70 games, and by 1989 he was homeless and addicted to cocaine.

== Kidnapping and arrest ==
On January 26, 1996, Whitney and a juvenile kidnapped Mark D. Fabiani, the personal attorney of then-First Lady Hillary Clinton. He was arrested, tried, convicted of a felony, and sentenced to 69 months in prison. Upon his release in 2000 he found work at the Niles Home for Children. Whitney asserted that he participated in the crime after being accused of stealing narcotics from another individual and as a way of protecting his sister whose life was threatened.

== Career statistics ==
Legend
GP	Games played	GS	Games started	MPG	Minutes per game
FG%	Field goal percentage	3P%	3-point field goal percentage	FT%	Free throw percentage
RPG	Rebounds per game	APG	Assists per game	SPG	Steals per game
BPG	Blocks per game	PPG	Points per game	**Bold**	Career high

=== NBA ===
==== Regular season ====
Year	Team	GP	GS	MPG	FG%	3P%	FT%	RPG	APG	SPG	BPG	PPG
1980–81	Kansas City	**47**		**16.6**	**.487**	**.333**	**.769**	**2.3**	**1.4**	**1.0**	**.1**	**7.3**
1981–82	Kansas City	23	4	11.6	.352	.000	.571	1.7	.8	.5	.0	2.3
Career		70	4	15.0	.462	.286	.750	2.1	1.2	.8	.1	5.8
