= Rich Kelley =

American basketball player (born 1953)

Personal information
- Born: March 23, 1953 (age 73) San Mateo, California, U.S.
- Listed height: 6 ft 11 in (2.11 m)
- Listed weight: 235 lb (107 kg)

Career information
- High school: Woodside (Woodside, California)
- College: Stanford (1972–1975)
- NBA draft: 1975: 1st round, 7th overall pick
- Drafted by: New Orleans Jazz
- Playing career: 1975–1986
- Position: Center / power forward
- Number: 53, 44, 50

Career history
- 1975–1979: New Orleans Jazz
- 1979–1980: New Jersey Nets
- 1980–1982: Phoenix Suns
- 1982–1983: Denver Nuggets
- 1983–1985: Utah Jazz
- 1985–1986: Sacramento Kings

Career highlights
- Third-team All-American – UPI (1975); 3× First-team All-Pac-8 (1973–1975)

Career NBA statistics
- Points: 6,199 (7.6 ppg)
- Rebounds: 5,678 (7.0 rpg)
- Assists: 2,092 (2.6 apg)
- Stats at NBA.com
- Stats at Basketball Reference
Medals
Representing United States
Men's basketball
FIBA World Championship
Bronze medal – third place	1974 Puerto Rico	Team competition

Richard Ryland Kelley (born March 23, 1953) is an American retired basketball player. Kelley played college basketball for the Stanford Cardinal and was the first-round pick (7th pick overall) of the New Orleans Jazz in the 1975 NBA draft. Kelley played eleven NBA seasons.

== College career ==
A center/power forward, a graduate of Woodside High School, Kelley played college basketball at Stanford University.

The 7-foot, 235-pound Kelley was drafted as an underclassman in the second round of the 1974 American Basketball Association ABA draft by the New York Nets, but he opted to stay in college for another year.

While in college, Kelley played for the Team USA in the 1974 FIBA World Championship, winning the bronze medal.

In his 76 career games at Stanford, under Coach Howard Dallmar, Kelley averaged a double-double of 18.6 points and 12.4 rebounds, shooting 49% from the floor and 78% from the line. He scored 1412 total points, with 944 total rebounds in his three varsity seasons.

== NBA career ==
In 1975, Kelley was drafted by the New Orleans Jazz in the first round of the 1975 NBA draft and by the Memphis Sounds in the second round of the 1975 ABA Draft.

In the NBA Kelley played for the New Orleans/Utah Jazz (1975–79, 1983–85), New Jersey Nets (1979–80), Phoenix Suns (1980–82), Denver Nuggets (1982–83) and Sacramento Kings (1985–86). His best individual season was with the Jazz in 1978–79, in which he averaged 15.7 points and 12.8 rebounds per game (good for second in the league in rebounding that year), and also established a franchise record with 166 blocked shots.

He helped the Suns win the 1980–81 NBA Pacific Division and the Jazz win the 1983–84 NBA Midwest Division.

He currently ranks 94th on the NBA's career offensive rebounds list (1,872).

In 11 seasons, he played in 814 games and played 17,711 minutes, a 48.8 field goal percentage (2,166 for 4,435), 78.3 free throw percentage (1,867 for 2,384), 5,678 total rebounds (1,872 offensive, 3,806 defensive), 2,092 assists, 694 steals, 749 blocked shots, 2,613 personal fouls and 6,199 points. He averaged 7.6 points and 7.0 rebounds in his 814 career games.

== Personal ==
After retirement, Kelley earned an MBA at Stanford. He is a co-founder of Search Fund Partners, having started the firm in 2004. He currently serves on the Boards of Directors of San Francisco Legal, Avadyne Health, HemaSource, Verengo, H&R Accounts, Asset Recovery Corporation and Medical Positioning, Inc.

Kelley has been involved in numerous small businesses and start-up companies as an operator, owner, and investor. His varied experience includes: CFO of SCORE! Educational Centers, CEO of San Jose Giants, General Partner of the Stanford Terrace Inn, developer of houses and subdivisions, owner of office buildings, investor in successful tech start-ups (Coinstar, PLX Technology, Corcept Therapeutics). He has also invested in many limited partnerships, including venture funds, and has been involved as a search fund investor since 1994.

== Honors ==
- Kelley was inducted into the Stanford Athletics Hall of Fame in 1985.
- In 2009, Kelley was inducted into the Woodside High School Community Hall of Fame.

== Career statistics ==
Legend
GP	Games played	GS	Games started	MPG	Minutes per game
FG%	Field goal percentage	3P%	3-point field goal percentage	FT%	Free throw percentage
RPG	Rebounds per game	APG	Assists per game	SPG	Steals per game
BPG	Blocks per game	PPG	Points per game	**Bold**	Career high

=== NBA ===
==== Regular season ====
Year	Team	GP	GS	MPG	FG%	3P%	FT%	RPG	APG	SPG	BPG	PPG
1975–76	New Orleans	75		17.9	.485		.776	7.0	2.1	.7	.8	7.0
1976–77	New Orleans	76		19.8	.477		.792	7.7	2.7	.6	.8	6.9
1977–78	New Orleans	**82**		25.8	.505		.779	9.3	2.8	1.1	1.6	10.2
1978–79	New Orleans	80		**33.8**	.506		.814	**12.8**	**3.6**	**1.6**	**2.1**	**15.7**
1979–80	New Jersey	57		25.7	.466	.000	.788	7.0	2.2	.9	1.4	10.0
1979–80	Phoenix	23		16.2	.506	–	.783	5.1	2.2	1.2	.7	5.8
1980–81	Phoenix	81		20.8	.506	.000	.758	5.4	3.5	1.0	.8	7.0
1981–82	Phoenix	81	**39**	23.4	.467	.000	.749	6.1	**3.6**	.8	.9	7.9
1982–83	Denver	38	0	14.9	.418	–	.786	4.5	1.6	.6	.5	4.6
1982–83	Utah	32	23	24.4	.467	–	**.829**	7.3	2.5	1.0	.7	7.2
1983–84	Utah	75	30	22.3	.500	–	.765	6.5	2.1	.7	.4	5.2
1984–85	Utah	77	34	16.6	.477	.000	.750	4.5	1.6	.5	.4	3.8
1985–86	Saramento	37	0	8.8	**.571**	.000	.818	2.2	1.1	.3	.1	2.0
Career		814	126	21.8	.488	.000	.783	7.0	2.6	.9	.9	7.6

==== Playoffs ====
Year	Team	GP	GS	MPG	FG%	3P%	FT%	RPG	APG	SPG	BPG	PPG
1980	Phoenix	8		18.3	.432	.000	**.900**	4.5	2.8	**1.1**	**.9**	5.9
1981	Phoenix	7		16.1	.400	.000	.643	5.0	1.9	.9	.4	4.1
1982	Phoenix	7		**27.3**	.500	–	.700	**6.9**	**4.3**	.9	.4	**9.7**
1984	Utah	**11**		18.3	**.556**	–	.862	5.3	2.0	.8	.5	5.0
1985	Utah	9	**5**	19.3	.474	–	.867	6.3	1.6	.8	.6	5.4
1986	Sacramento	3	0	11.7	.333		.833	4.0	1.3	.7	.0	3.7
Career		45	5	19.1	.467	.000	.798	5.5	2.3	.9	.5	5.8
