= 1980–81 Portland Trail Blazers season =

NBA professional basketball team season

- Head coach: Jack Ramsay
- General manager: Harry Glickman
- Owner: Larry Weinberg
- Arena: Memorial Coliseum

Results
- Record: 45–37 (.549)
- Place: Division: 3rd (Pacific); Conference: 4th (Western)
- Playoff finish: First round (lost to Kings 1–2)
- Stats at Basketball Reference

The 1980–81 Portland Trail Blazers season was the 11th season of the Portland Trail Blazers in the National Basketball Association (NBA). The Blazers won seven more games than the previous season, ending with a record of 45–37 and making the playoffs for the fifth consecutive season.

The Blazers were eliminated from the 1981 NBA Playoffs after losing their best-of-three first-round series to the Kansas City Kings, two games to one.

== Draft picks ==
Note: This is not a complete list; only the first two rounds are covered, as well as any other picks by the franchise who played at least one NBA game.

Round	Pick	Player	Position	Nationality	School/Club team
1	10	Ronnie Lester	G	United States	Iowa
2	32	David Lawrence	F	United States	McNeese State
2	33	Bruce Collins	G/F	United States	Weber State
3	56	Mike Harper	F/C	United States	North Park
8	168	John Stroeder	F	United States	Montana

== Roster ==
1980–81 Portland Trail Blazers roster
Players

Pos.	No.	Player	Height	Weight	DOB	From
G	12	Billy Ray Bates	6 ft 4 in (1.93 m)	210 lb (95 kg)	1956–05–31	Kentucky State
C	45	Geoff Crompton	6 ft 11 in (2.11 m)	280 lb (127 kg)	1955–07–04	North Carolina
G	11	Mike Gale	6 ft 4 in (1.93 m)	185 lb (84 kg)	1950–07–18	Elizabeth City State
F	30	Bob Gross	6 ft 6 in (1.98 m)	200 lb (91 kg)	1953–08–03	Long Beach State
F	32	Mike Harper	6 ft 10 in (2.08 m)	195 lb (88 kg)	1957–12–09	North Park
C	44	Kevin Kunnert	6 ft 9 in (2.06 m)	230 lb (104 kg)	1951–11–11	Iowa
SF	33	Calvin Natt	6 ft 6 in (1.98 m)	220 lb (100 kg)	1957–01–08	Louisiana–Monroe
F/C	25	Tom Owens	6 ft 10 in (2.08 m)	215 lb (98 kg)	1949–06–28	South Carolina
G	4	Jim Paxson	6 ft 6 in (1.98 m)	200 lb (91 kg)	1957–07–09	Dayton
PG	14	Kelvin Ransey	6 ft 1 in (1.85 m)	170 lb (77 kg)	1958–05–03	Ohio State
F/C	43	Mychal Thompson	6 ft 10 in (2.08 m)	226 lb (103 kg)	1955–01–30	Minnesota
F	42	Kermit Washington	6 ft 8 in (2.03 m)	230 lb (104 kg)	1951–09–17	American

Coaches
Head coach
- Jack Ramsay
Assistant(s)
- Bucky Buckwalter

Legend
- (DP) Unsigned draft pick
- (FA) Free agent
- (S) Suspended
- Injured

== Regular season ==
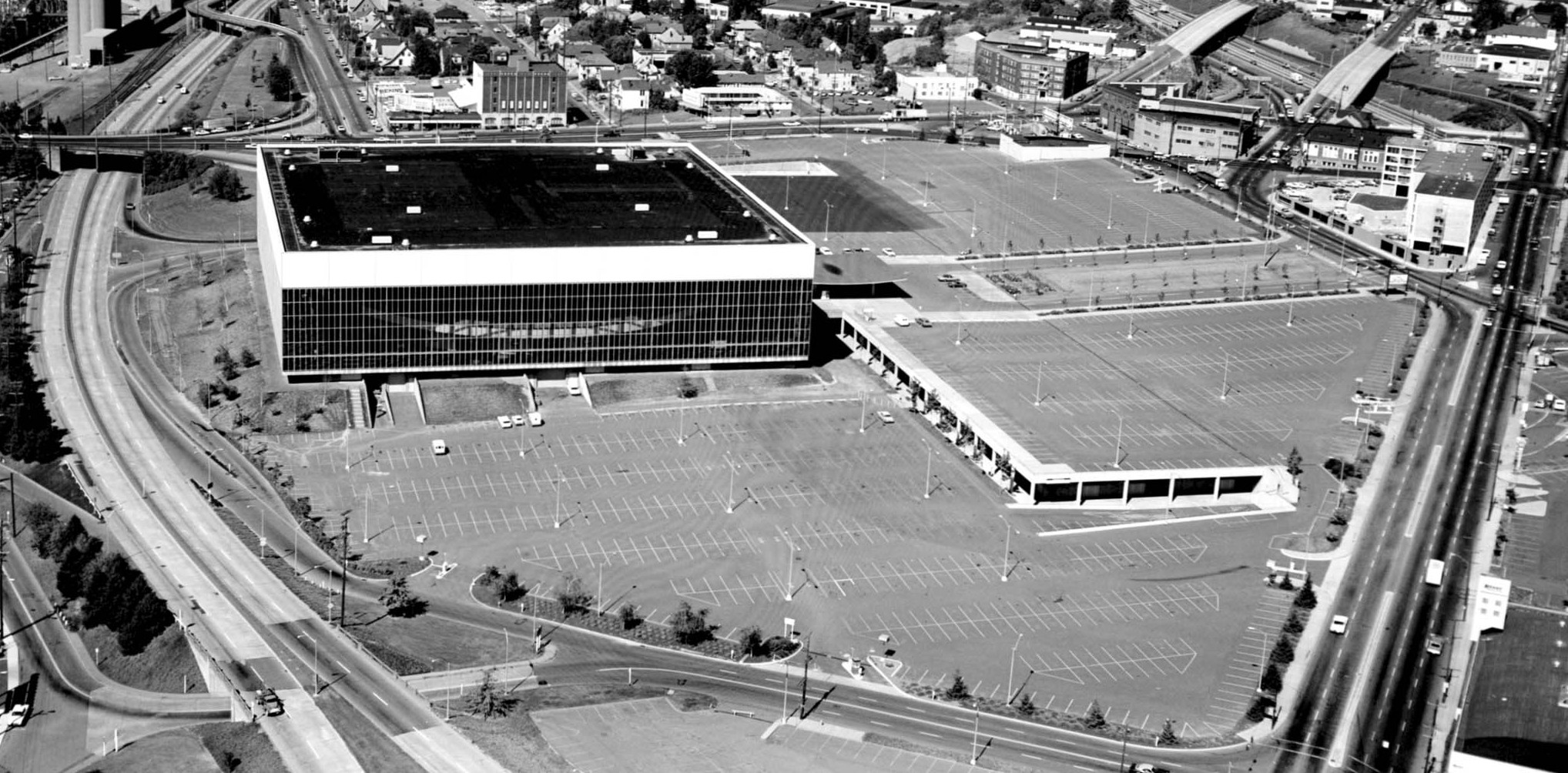
The Trail Blazers played their home games at Veterans Memorial Coliseum.

=== Season standings ===
Pacific Division	W	L	PCT	GB	Home	Road	Div
y-Phoenix Suns	57	25	.695	–	36–5	21–20	22–8
x-Los Angeles Lakers	54	28	.659	3.0	30–11	24–17	19–11
x-Portland Trail Blazers	45	37	.549	12.0	30–11	15–26	18–12
Golden State Warriors	39	43	.476	18.0	26–15	13–28	10–20
San Diego Clippers	36	46	.439	21.0	22–19	14–27	14–16
Seattle SuperSonics	34	48	.415	23.0	22–19	12–29	7–23

#	Western Conference				
#	Team	W	L	PCT	GB
1	c-Phoenix Suns	57	25	.695	–
2	y-San Antonio Spurs	52	30	.634	5
3	x-Los Angeles Lakers	54	28	.659	3
4	x-Portland Trail Blazers	45	37	.549	12
5	x-Kansas City Kings	40	42	.488	17
6	x-Houston Rockets	40	42	.488	17
7	Golden State Warriors	39	43	.476	18
8	Denver Nuggets	37	45	.451	20
9	San Diego Clippers	36	46	.439	21
10	Seattle SuperSonics	34	48	.415	23
11	Utah Jazz	28	54	.341	29
12	Dallas Mavericks	15	67	.183	42

z – clinched division title
y – clinched division title
x – clinched playoff spot

== Game log ==
=== Regular season ===
1980–81 game log
Total: 45–37 (home: 30–11; road: 15–26)
October: 3–7 (home: 3–1; road: 0–6)

Game	Date	Team	Score	High points	High rebounds	High assists	Location Attendance	Record
1	October 10	@ Utah	L 86–96				Salt Palace Acord Arena	0–1
2	October 12	Seattle	W 107–96				Memorial Coliseum	1–1
3	October 15	@ Golden State	L 92–95				Oakland–Alameda County Coliseum Arena	1–2
4	October 17	Houston	L 99–102				Memorial Coliseum	1–3
5	October 21	Los Angeles	W 107–103				Memorial Coliseum	2–3
6	October 24	Dallas	W 120–105				Memorial Coliseum	3–3
7	October 26	@ Seattle	L 98–111				Kingdome	3–4
8	October 28	@ San Antonio	L 112–120				HemisFair Arena	3–5
9	October 29	@ Kansas City	L 98–115				Kemper Arena	3–6

November: 4–12 (home: 4–4; road: 0–8)

Game	Date	Team	Score	High points	High rebounds	High assists	Location Attendance	Record
10	November 1	Utah	L 87–95				Memorial Coliseum	3–7
11	November 2	Cleveland	W 102–96				Memorial Coliseum	4–7
12	November 4	@ Los Angeles	L 118–119				The Forum	4–8
13	November 7	Golden State	W 122–113				Memorial Coliseum	5–8
14	November 8	San Diego	L 106–110 (OT)				Memorial Coliseum	5–9
15	November 11	Kansas City	L 101–102				Memorial Coliseum	5–10
16	November 14	@ Dallas	L 106–113				Reunion Arena	5–11
17	November 15	@ Denver	L 123–125				McNichols Sports Arena	5–12
18	November 16	@ Phoenix	L 107–119				Arizona Veterans Memorial Coliseum	5–13
19	November 18	Denver	W 122–103				Memorial Coliseum	6–13
20	November 20	Milwaukee	L 93–97				Memorial Coliseum	6–14
21	November 23	Dallas	W 116–96				Memorial Coliseum	7–14
22	November 25	@ Atlanta	L 108–112				The Omni	7–15
23	November 26	@ Boston	L 101–126				Boston Garden	7–16
24	November 28	@ Philadelphia	L 103–116				The Spectrum	7–17
25	November 29	@ New York	L 110–111				Madison Square Garden	7–18

December: 13–2 (home: 8–2; road: 5–0)

Game	Date	Team	Score	High points	High rebounds	High assists	Location Attendance	Record
26	December 2	New Jersey	L 105–118				Memorial Coliseum	7–19
27	December 4	@ San Diego	W 103–100				San Diego Sports Arena	8–19
28	December 5	Chicago	W 116–115				Memorial Coliseum	9–19
29	December 7	San Antonio	W 116–115				Memorial Coliseum	10–19
30	December 9	Seattle	W 111–98				Memorial Coliseum	11–19
31	December 12	Houston	W 106–100				Memorial Coliseum	12–19
32	December 14	@ Phoenix	W 116–110				Arizona Veterans Memorial Coliseum	13–19
33	December 17	@ Golden State	W 115–113				Oakland–Alameda County Coliseum Arena	14–19
34	December 19	@ Los Angeles	W 110–106				The Forum	15–19
35	December 20	Atlanta	W 122–119 (OT)				Memorial Coliseum	16–19
36	December 21	Phoenix	L 100–111				Memorial Coliseum	16–20
37	December 23	Los Angeles	W 108–102				Memorial Coliseum	17–20
38	December 25	Golden State	W 115–114				Memorial Coliseum	18–20
39	December 26	@ Seattle	W 96–90				Kingdome	19–20
40	December 30	Philadelphia	W 109–108				Memorial Coliseum	20–20

January: 7–7 (home: 4–1; road: 3–6)

Game	Date	Team	Score	High points	High rebounds	High assists	Location Attendance	Record
41	January 1	Denver	W 122–119				Memorial Coliseum	21–20
42	January 3	@ Utah	L 103–109				Salt Palace Acord Arena	21–21
43	January 4	Boston	L 111–120				Memorial Coliseum	21–22
44	January 6	Detroit	W 110–90				Memorial Coliseum	22–22
45	January 9	@ San Antonio	L 86–102				HemisFair Arena	22–23
46	January 10	@ Houston	L 105–106				The Summit	22–24
47	January 14	@ Kansas City	W 110–91				Kemper Arena	23–24
48	January 16	@ Chicago	W 113–112				Chicago Stadium	24–24
49	January 18	@ Milwaukee	L 103–110				MECCA Arena	24–25
50	January 20	@ Cleveland	L 94–99				Richfield Coliseum	24–26
51	January 23	New York	W 117–90				Memorial Coliseum	25–26
52	January 25	San Antonio	W 118–100				Memorial Coliseum	26–26
53	January 26	@ Los Angeles	L 112–124				The Forum	26–27
54	January 29	@ San Diego	W 108–106				San Diego Sports Arena	27–27

February: 7–6 (home: 4–2; road: 3–4)

Game	Date	Team	Score	High points	High rebounds	High assists	Location Attendance	Record
55	February 3	Washington	W 111–104 (OT)				Memorial Coliseum	28–27
56	February 4	@ Golden State	L 100–115				Oakland–Alameda County Coliseum Arena	28–28
57	February 6	@ San Antonio	L 96–122				HemisFair Arena	28–29
58	February 8	Kansas City	W 129–123 (OT)				Memorial Coliseum	29–29
59	February 12	Seattle	L 109–112				Memorial Coliseum	29–30
60	February 13	@ Denver	L 143–162				McNichols Sports Arena	29–31
61	February 15	Utah	W 118–84				Memorial Coliseum	30–31
62	February 17	@ Washington	W 124–104				Capital Centre	31–31
63	February 19	@ Detroit	W 115–106				Pontiac Silverdome	32–31
64	February 20	@ New Jersey	L 113–123				Rutgers Athletic Center	32–32
65	February 22	@ Indiana	W 113–109 (OT)				Market Square Arena	33–32
66	February 24	San Diego	L 107–121				Memorial Coliseum	33–33
67	February 27	Phoenix	W 121–117				Memorial Coliseum	34–33

March: 11–4 (home: 7–1; road: 4–3)

Game	Date	Team	Score	High points	High rebounds	High assists	Location Attendance	Record
68	March 1	Utah	W 108–97				Memorial Coliseum	35–33
69	March 3	Indiana	W 117–112				Memorial Coliseum	36–33
70	March 5	@ Kansas City	L 100–106				Kemper Arena	36–34
71	March 6	@ Phoenix	L 107–128				Arizona Veterans Memorial Coliseum	36–35
72	March 8	Golden State	W 120–112 (OT)				Memorial Coliseum	37–35
73	March 10	@ Denver	W 142–137				McNichols Sports Arena	38–35
74	March 13	@ Houston	L 104–126				The Summit	38–36
75	March 15	Dallas	W 135–110				Memorial Coliseum	39–36
76	March 17	San Diego	W 127–112				Memorial Coliseum	40–36
77	March 20	Houston	W 107–103				Memorial Coliseum	41–36
78	March 21	Los Angeles	L 111–117				Memorial Coliseum	41–37
79	March 24	Phoenix	W 120–111				Memorial Coliseum	42–37
80	March 25	@ Seattle	W 112–103				Kingdome	43–37
81	March 27	@ Dallas	W 123–109				Reunion Arena	44–37
82	March 29	@ San Diego	W 144–129				San Diego Sports Arena	45–37

1980–81 schedule

=== Playoffs ===
1981 playoff game log
First round: 1–2 (home: 0–2; road: 1–0)

Game	Date	Team	Score	High points	High rebounds	High assists	Location Attendance	Series
1	April 1	Kansas City	L 97–98 (OT)	Billy Ray Bates (25)	Kermit Washington (17)	Kelvin Ransey (10)	Memorial Coliseum; 12,666	0–1
2	April 3	@ Kansas City	W 124–119 (OT)	Mychal Thompson (40)	Kermit Washington (18)	Kelvin Ransey (7)	Kemper Arena; 11,088	1–1
3	April 5	Kansas City	L 95–104	Billy Ray Bates (34)	Kermit Washington (17)	Kelvin Ransey (8)	Memorial Coliseum; 12,666	1–2

1981 schedule

== Awards and honors ==
- Kelvin Ransey, All-NBA Rookie Team
- Kermit Washington, NBA All-Defensive Second Team

== Transactions ==
July 21, 1980

- Waived Charles Jones

August 15, 1980

- Traded T. R. Dunn and a first round pick in the 1983 NBA draft to the Denver Nuggets in exchange for a 1983 first round draft pick and a second round pick in the 1984 NBA draft. Denver drafted Howard Carter and the Trail Blazers selected Clyde Drexler in 1983 and Steve Colter in 1984.

September 24, 1980

- Signed free agent Roy Hamilton

October 8, 1980

- Traded Jim Brewer to the Los Angeles Lakers in exchange for the a second round draft pick in the 1984 NBA draft. During the draft the Trail Blazers had the option to swap first round picks with the Lakers but declined. Portland selected Jerome Kersey with the Lakers pick.

October 13, 1980

- Waived Roy Hamilton

December 19, 1980

- Traded Ron Brewer to the San Antonio Spurs in exchange for Mike Gale and a first round pick in the 1982 NBA draft. The Trail Blazers later traded that pick which the Detroit Pistons used to select Ricky Pierce.

February 2, 1981

- Signed free agent Geoff Crompton

June 5, 1981

- Traded Tom Owens to the Indiana Pacers in exchange for a first round pick in the 1984 NBA draft. Portland selected Sam Bowie with the pick.

June 8, 1981

- Traded Mike Gale to the Golden State Warriors in exchange for a second round pick in 1982 NBA draft and a 1985 second round pick. In 1982 Portland selected Audie Norris and Mike Smrek was chosen in 1985.
