= 1980–81 Phoenix Suns season =

NBA team season

- Division champions
- Head coach: John MacLeod
- General manager: Jerry Colangelo
- Owners: Karl Eller, Don Pitt, Don Diamond, Bhavik Darji, Marvin Meyer, Richard L. Bloch
- Arena: Arizona Veterans Memorial Coliseum

Results
- Record: 57–25 (.695)
- Place: Division: 1st (Pacific); Conference: 1st (Western)
- Playoff finish: Conference semifinals (lost to Kings 3–4)
- Stats at Basketball Reference

Local media
- Television: KNXV
- Radio: KTAR

The 1980–81 Phoenix Suns season was the 13th season for the Phoenix Suns of the National Basketball Association. At 57–25, the team had finished with its best regular season record. For the Suns, they had appeared in their first Finals five years ago but never could claim a divisional title as their own. Atop the Western Conference standings for the first time, the Suns had earned a bye in the first round of the playoffs. The offense was highlighted by a balanced attack, with four starters averaging 15 points or more a game, but none greater than 19. This, despite a trade that meant the departure of four-time All-NBA Paul Westphal, who was swapped for fourth year All-Star guard Dennis Johnson. In the conference semifinals, the Suns would meet the Kansas City Kings, a team they had defeated in the first round one season ago but found more difficult to handle this season. After a 22-point win in game one, the Suns would go on to lose game seven and the series. The Suns were led by head coach John MacLeod and played all home games in Arizona Veterans Memorial Coliseum.

Johnson was a tough defender and later earned NBA All-Defensive First Team honors. He was also named to the All-NBA First Team. In the All-Star Game, Johnson was joined by teammates Walter Davis and Truck Robinson. It was the first time the Suns sent three players to the All-Star Game.

Johnson and Robinson shared top scoring marks for the Suns with an average of 18.8 points a game, while Robinson also led the team in rebounds per game at 9.6. Davis averaged 18.0 points per game and Alvan Adams chipped in 14.9 for the second consecutive season. Adams, a 6'9" center/forward led the team in assists at 4.6 a game.

== Offseason ==
=== NBA draft ===
Round	Pick	Player	Position	Nationality	College
2	42	Kimberly Belton	Center	United States	Stanford
3	59	John Campbell	Forward	United States	Clemson
3	65	Doug True	Forward	United States	California
4	88	Leroy Stampley	Guard	United States	Loyola (IL)
5	111	Mark Stevens	Forward	United States	Northern Arizona
6	134	Coby Leavitt	Center	United States	Utah
7	157	Ron Williams	Forward	United States	Western Montana
8	175	Jim Conolly	Forward	United States	La Salle
9	196	Keith French	Forward	United States	North Park
10	211	Randy Carroll	Forward	United States	Kansas

This was the first year in franchise history that none of the team's draft picks played for the franchise. Not only did no selection play for the Suns, none ever played a game in the NBA.

== Roster ==
1980–81 Phoenix Suns roster
Players

Pos.	No.	Player	Height	Weight	DOB	From
C	33	Alvan Adams	6 ft 9 in (2.06 m)	210 lb (95 kg)	1954-07-19	Oklahoma
F/C	45	Jeff Cook	6 ft 10 in (2.08 m)	215 lb (98 kg)	1956-10-21	Idaho State
G/F	6	Walter Davis	6 ft 6 in (1.98 m)	193 lb (88 kg)	1954-09-09	North Carolina
G	22	Johnny High	6 ft 3 in (1.91 m)	185 lb (84 kg)	1957-04-25	Nevada
G	24	Dennis Johnson	6 ft 4 in (1.93 m)	185 lb (84 kg)	1954-09-18	Pepperdine
C	53	Rich Kelley	7 ft 0 in (2.13 m)	235 lb (107 kg)	1953-03-23	Stanford
F	50	Joel Kramer	6 ft 7 in (2.01 m)	203 lb (92 kg)	1955-11-30	San Diego State
G	4	Kyle Macy	6 ft 3 in (1.91 m)	175 lb (79 kg)	1957-04-09	Kentucky
F	40	Mike Niles	6 ft 6 in (1.98 m)	225 lb (102 kg)	1955-03-31	Cal State Fullerton
F	21	Leonard Robinson	6 ft 7 in (2.01 m)	225 lb (102 kg)	1951-10-04	Tennessee State
F	14	Alvin Scott	6 ft 7 in (2.01 m)	185 lb (84 kg)	1955-09-14	Oral Roberts

Coaches
Head coach
- John MacLeod
Assistant(s)
- Al Bianchi
- John Wetzel

Legend
- (DP) Unsigned draft pick
- (FA) Free agent
- (S) Suspended
- Injured

== Regular season ==
=== Standings ===
Pacific Division	W	L	PCT	GB	Home	Road	Div
y-Phoenix Suns	57	25	.695	–	36–5	21–20	22–8
x-Los Angeles Lakers	54	28	.659	3.0	30–11	24–17	19–11
x-Portland Trail Blazers	45	37	.549	12.0	30–11	15–26	18–12
Golden State Warriors	39	43	.476	18.0	26–15	13–28	10–20
San Diego Clippers	36	46	.439	21.0	22–19	14–27	14–16
Seattle SuperSonics	34	48	.415	23.0	22–19	12–29	7–23

#	Western Conference				
#	Team	W	L	PCT	GB
1	c-Phoenix Suns	57	25	.695	–
2	y-San Antonio Spurs	52	30	.634	5
3	x-Los Angeles Lakers	54	28	.659	3
4	x-Portland Trail Blazers	45	37	.549	12
5	x-Kansas City Kings	40	42	.488	17
6	x-Houston Rockets	40	42	.488	17
7	Golden State Warriors	39	43	.476	18
8	Denver Nuggets	37	45	.451	20
9	San Diego Clippers	36	46	.439	21
10	Seattle SuperSonics	34	48	.415	23
11	Utah Jazz	28	54	.341	29
12	Dallas Mavericks	15	67	.183	42

== Playoffs ==
=== Game log ===
1981 playoff game log
Conference semifinals: 3–4 (home: 2–2; road: 1–2)

Game	Date	Team	Score	High points	High rebounds	High assists	Location Attendance	Series
1	April 7	Kansas City	W 102–80	Johnson, Davis (16)	Jeff Cook (12)	three players tied (4)	Arizona Veterans Memorial Coliseum; 12,660	1–0
2	April 8	Kansas City	L 83–88	Dennis Johnson (31)	Truck Robinson (8)	Alvan Adams (4)	Arizona Veterans Memorial Coliseum; 12,660	1–1
3	April 10	@ Kansas City	L 92–93	Johnson, Adams (19)	Dennis Johnson (9)	three players tied (4)	Kemper Arena; 13,776	1–2
4	April 12	@ Kansas City	L 95–102	Truck Robinson (23)	Truck Robinson (13)	Alvan Adams (4)	Kemper Arena; 11,089	1–3
5	April 15	Kansas City	W 101–89	Walter Davis (20)	Truck Robinson (20)	Johnson, Davis (4)	Arizona Veterans Memorial Coliseum; 12,660	2–3
6	April 17	@ Kansas City	W 81–76	Dennis Johnson (17)	Truck Robinson (10)	Alvan Adams (7)	Kemper Arena; 15,232	3–3
7	April 19	Kansas City	L 88–95	Dennis Johnson (28)	Johnson, Adams (7)	Dennis Johnson (5)	Arizona Veterans Memorial Coliseum; 12,660	3–4

1981 schedule

== Awards and honors ==
=== All-Star ===
- Walter Davis was voted as a starter for the Western Conference in the All-Star Game. It was his fourth consecutive All-Star selection. Davis finished second in voting among Western Conference forwards with 172,479 votes.
- Dennis Johnson was selected as a reserve for the Western Conference in the All-Star Game. It was his third consecutive All-Star selection. Johnson finished fifth in voting among Western Conference guards with 123,287 votes.
- Truck Robinson was selected as a reserve for the Western Conference in the All-Star Game. It was his second All-Star selection.
- John MacLeod coached the Western Conference All-Star team in a 120–123 loss to the East.

=== Season ===
- Dennis Johnson was named to the All-NBA First Team. Johnson also finished eighth in MVP voting.
- Dennis Johnson was named to the NBA All-Defensive First Team.
- Alvan Adams had the league's best defensive rating, allowing 96.2 points per 100 possessions.
- Truck Robinson finished 19th in MVP voting.
- Walter Davis finished 24th in MVP voting.

== Player statistics ==
Legend
GP	Games played	GS	Games started	MPG	Minutes per game
FG%	Field-goal percentage	3P%	3-point field-goal percentage	FT%	Free-throw percentage
RPG	Rebounds per game	APG	Assists per game	SPG	Steals per game
BPG	Blocks per game	PPG	Points per game

=== Season ===
Phoenix Suns statistics
Player	GP	GS	MPG	FG%	3P%	FT%	RPG	APG	SPG	BPG	PPG
Alvan Adams	75	69	27.4	.526	.	.768	7.3	4.6	1.4	.9	14.9
Jeff Cook	79	77	27.7	.464	.000	.645	5.9	2.5	1.0	.7	8.5
Walter Davis	78	77	28.0	.539	.412	.836	2.6	3.9	1.2	.2	18.0
Johnny High	81	10	21.6	.427	.083	.693	2.8	2.5	1.6	.3	8.4
Dennis Johnson	79	77	33.1	.436	.216	.820	4.6	3.7	1.7	.8	18.8
Rich Kelley	81	13	20.8	.506	.000	.758	5.4	3.5	1.0	.8	7.0
Joel Kramer	82	0	13.0	.527	.000	.692	2.8	1.1	.4	.2	4.1
Kyle Macy	82	0	17.9	.511	.235	.899	1.6	2.0	.9	.1	8.1
Mike Niles	44	0	5.3	.348	.500	.459	1.3	0.3	.2	.0	2.6
Truck Robinson	82	82	37.7	.505	.	.629	9.6	2.5	.8	.5	18.8
Alvin Scott	82	5	17.4	.497	.167	.764	3.3	1.4	.7	.9	5.4

=== Playoffs ===
Phoenix Suns statistics
Player	GP	GS	MPG	FG%	3P%	FT%	RPG	APG	SPG	BPG	PPG
Alvan Adams	7	7	31.1	.450	.	.714	5.9	3.7	.6	.1	10.6
Jeff Cook	7	7	29.4	.463	1.000	.737	6.7	1.6	.1	.0	9.3
Walter Davis	7	7	28.4	.481†	.000	.588	2.7	3.1	1.0	.1	16.0
Johnny High	7	0	16.7	.424	.	.643	2.7	0.9	.9	.3	5.3
Dennis Johnson	7	7	38.1	.473	.200	.762^	4.7	2.9	1.3	1.3	19.6
Rich Kelley	7	0	16.1	.400	.000	.643	5.0	1.9	.9	.4	4.1
Joel Kramer	7	0	14.4	.520†	.	.500	2.3	0.6	.3	.3	3.9
Kyle Macy	7	0	14.6	.528†	.500	1.000^	1.9	1.6	.7	.0	7.0
Mike Niles	2	0	2.0	.000	.	.	0.0	0.0	.5	.0	0.0
Truck Robinson	7	7	33.3	.351	.	.588	10.7	1.9	.7	.3	10.6
Alvin Scott	7	0	17.1	.467	.	.667	2.7	1.0	.6	.9	5.4

† – Minimum 20 field goals made.
^ – Minimum 10 free throws made.

== Transactions ==
=== Trades ===
June 3, 1980	To Seattle SuperSonics (United States) Paul Westphal	To Phoenix Suns (United States) Dennis Johnson
June 9, 1980	To Dallas Mavericks 1981 second-round draft pick ( (United States) Elston Turner) Future considerations	To Phoenix Suns (United States) Wiley Peck
November 25, 1980	To Indiana Pacers (United States) Don Buse	To Phoenix Suns 1981 second-round draft pick ( (United States) Al Leslie) 1982 second-round draft pick ( (United States) Jose Slaughter)
February 3, 1981	To San Diego Clippers (Sent picks to Phoenix as compensation for free agent Garfield Heard)	To Phoenix Suns 1981 third-round draft pick ( (United States) Sam Clancy) 1983 third-round draft pick ( (United States) Derek Whittenburg)

=== Free agents ===
==== Additions ====
Date	Player	Contract	Old Team
June 25, 1980	Mike Niles	Undisclosed	

==== Subtractions ====
Date	Player	Reason left	New team
May 28, 1980	Mike Bratz	Expansion draft	Dallas Mavericks
September 9, 1980	Bayard Forrest	Retired	
October 8, 1980	Wiley Peck	Waived	
October 14, 1980	Garfield Heard	Free agent	San Diego Clippers
