= Otis Birdsong =

American basketball player

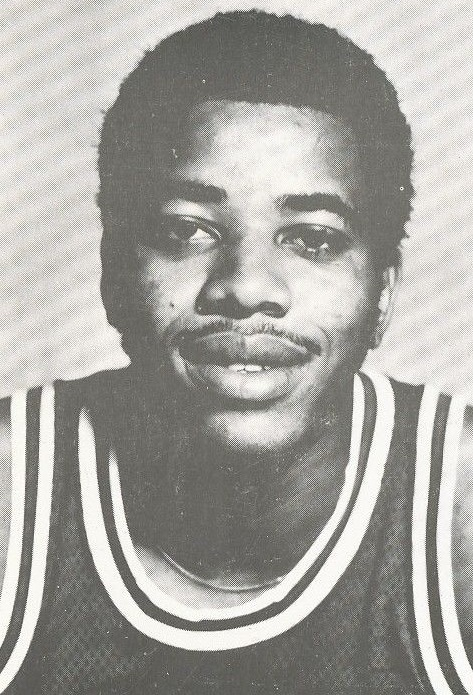
- Birdsong in 1978

Personal information
- Born: December 9, 1955 (age 70) Winter Haven, Florida, U.S.
- Listed height: 6 ft 3 in (1.91 m)
- Listed weight: 190 lb (86 kg)

Career information
- High school: Winter Haven (Winter Haven, Florida)
- College: Houston (1973–1977)
- NBA draft: 1977: 1st round, 2nd overall pick
- Drafted by: Kansas City Kings
- Playing career: 1977–1990
- Position: Shooting guard / point guard
- Number: 10, 12

Career history
- 1977–1981: Kansas City Kings
- 1981–1988: New Jersey Nets
- 1988–1990: Tulsa Fast Breakers
- 1989: Boston Celtics

Career highlights
- 4× NBA All-Star (1979–1981, 1984); All-NBA Second Team (1981); CBA champion (1989); Consensus first-team All-American (1977); SWC Player of the Year (1977); 2× First-team All-SWC (1976, 1977); No. 10 retired by Houston Cougars

Career NBA statistics
- Points: 12,544 (18.0 ppg)
- Rebounds: 2,072 (3.0 rpg)
- Assists: 2,260 (3.2 apg)
- Stats at NBA.com
- Stats at Basketball Reference
- Collegiate Basketball Hall of Fame
Medals
Representing United States
Men's basketball
Pan American Games
Gold medal – first place	1975 Mexico City	Team competition

Otis Lee Birdsong (born December 9, 1955) is an American former professional basketball player. He spent twelve seasons (1977–1989) in the National Basketball Association (NBA) and appeared in four NBA All-Star Games.

A 6 ft 3 in (1.91 m) guard who attended Winter Haven High School and the University of Houston, Birdsong was selected by the Kansas City Kings with the second pick of the 1977 NBA draft. He would spend four seasons with the Kings, averaging a career high 24.6 points per game during the 1980–81 season. He also played seven seasons with the New Jersey Nets and one with the Boston Celtics, and then ended his career at the end of the 1988–89 season.

== Collegiate playing career ==
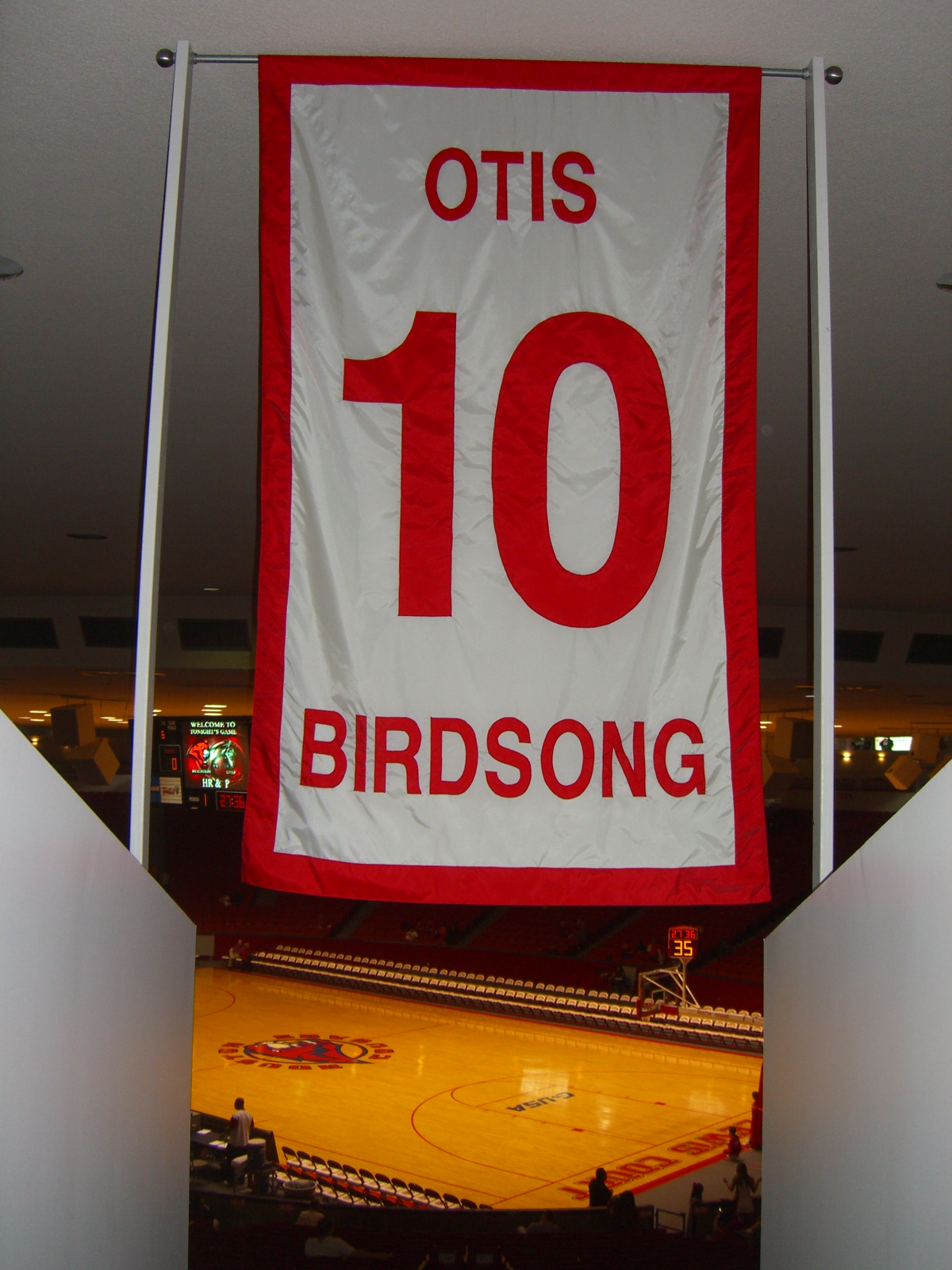
One of only five numbers retired by the University of Houston men's basketball team, Birdsong's no. 10 hangs in Fertitta Center.

As a college freshman, Birdsong finished third among the team's scoring leaders with 14.3 points per game. The following year, Birdsong etched his name in the University of Houston's record books by becoming the first sophomore in the school's history to register 1,000 career points. When the Cougars began playing in the Southwest Conference, Birdsong soon established himself as the dominant scorer in the league's history. In his first year as an SWC player, Birdsong led the league in scoring, finishing eighth nationally with a 26.1 average. Birdsong was named a 1977 Consensus All-American and Southwest Conference Player of the Year after leading the Houston Cougars to a 29–8 record and the National Invitational Tournament championship game against St. Bonaventure. Birdsong scored 38 points and made 18 free throws against the Bonnies, but Houston lost. He ranked fourth nationally in scoring and set an SWC record with 30.3 points per game. His accomplishments resulted in Birdsong being named SWC Player of the Decade.

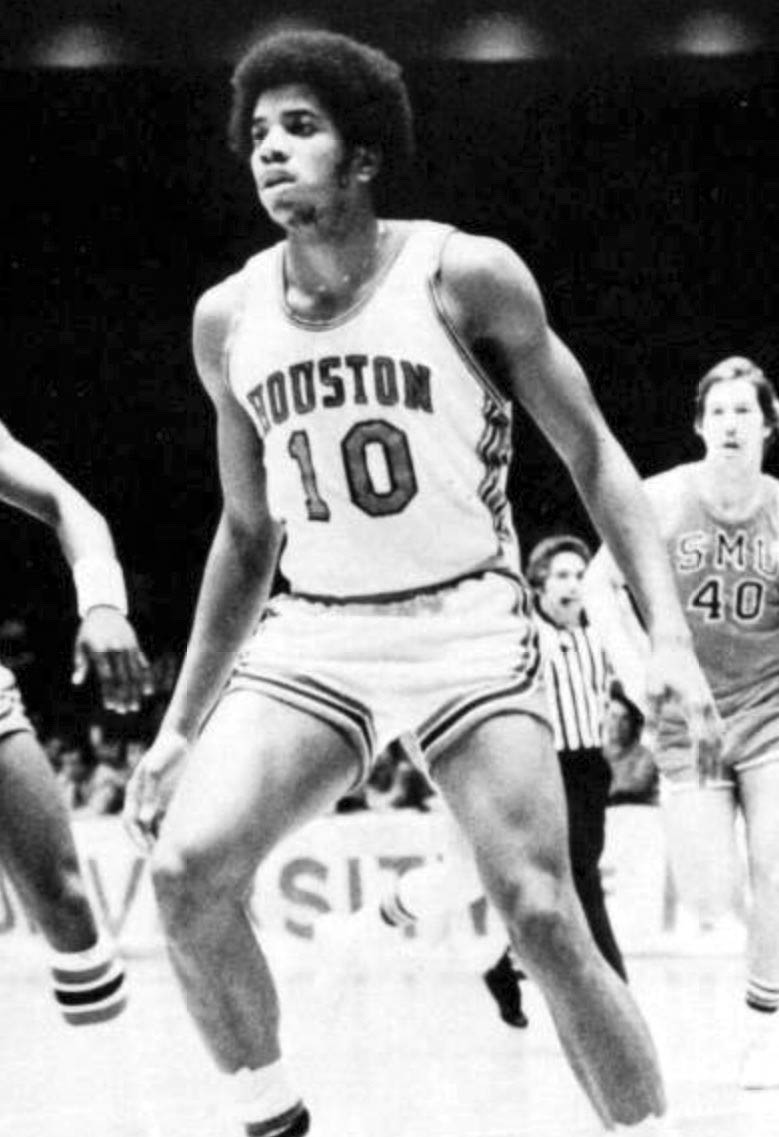
Birdsong at Houston.

In addition to receiving All-American honors, Birdsong was named to the All-Southwest Conference team in 1976 and 1977. Additionally, he was named District VI Player of the Year (encompassing Texas, Oklahoma and Arkansas) by the United States Basketball Writers Association. He was a member of the USBWA's All-District VI Team in 1975, 1976 and 1977, and he was team captain both his junior and senior years. During his four seasons with the Cougars, the team compiled a 79–38 record. He left the University of Houston as the school's second leading all-time scorer with 2,832 total college career points.

Birdsong also ranks second on Houston's career charts in field goals, third in all-time steals, sixth in assists and ninth in field goal percentages. He continues to hold the school record for free throws with a total of 480.

== Professional career ==
After completing his eligibility at the University of Houston, Birdsong was the second player chosen in the 1977 NBA draft when he was taken by the Kansas City Kings.

On January 28, 1979, Birdsong recorded a career-high 11 assists alongside 30 points in a 137–109 win against the Cleveland Cavaliers.

On January 29, 1980, Birdsong scored a career-high 49 points while making 20 of 25 field goals in a win against the Denver Nuggets.

During the 1980-81 NBA season, after averaging a career best 24.6 points per game, Birdsong played a lead role in the 40-42 Five Seed Kings making an unlikely run to the Western Conference Finals. In the first round of the playoffs, Birdsong averaged 27 points, 6 assists, 4 rebounds, and 2.3 steals, in a victory over the Portland Trail Blazers. However, the first game of the second round, Birdsong was sidelined with a devastating ankle injury. Despite this, the Kings, who also were missing starting guard Phil Ford due to an eye injury suffered in the regular season, pulled off a surprising 4–3 series victory over the Phoenix Suns. However, in the Western Conference Finals the Kings unexpected playoff run would come to an end, when defeated in five games by the Moses Malone-led Houston Rockets.

On June 8, 1981, Birdsong was traded by Kansas City with a 1981 2nd round draft pick (Steve Lingenfelter was later selected) to the New Jersey Nets for Cliff Robinson.

On December 3, 1983, Birdsong scored a season-high 38 points during a 128–122 loss to the Portland Trail Blazers. Birdsong's deepest postseason run with the Nets would come in that season's playoffs. The Nets upset the defending champion Philadelphia 76ers, led by Moses Malone and Julius Erving, in the first round. Now accepting a more team-oriented role than in Kansas City, Birdsong was 4th in team points per game in the series at 14.4, while teammates Buck Williams and Michael Ray Richardson took primary scoring duties. The following series, however, the Nets would fall to Sidney Moncrief and the Milwaukee Bucks.

In total, he scored over 12,000 career points, averaging 18 points per game, in 12 seasons with the Kings, New Jersey Nets and Boston Celtics. Birdsong played in four NBA All-Star Games. He was a member of the All-NBA Second Team in 1981.

Birdsong played for the Tulsa Fast Breakers of the Continental Basketball Association (CBA) from 1988 to 1990. He won a CBA championship with the Fast Breakers in 1989.

Birdsong returned to Houston following his career and served as a member of the Cougars' radio broadcast team for several seasons before moving to Dallas.

In 2000, Birdsong was inducted in the University of Houston's Hall of Honor as well as the Polk County, Florida Hall of Fame. In 2006, he was inducted into the Florida High School Hall of fame.

On October 20, 2014, in Fort Worth, Texas, Birdsong was inducted into the Southwest Conference Hall of Fame (presented by the Texas Sports Hall of Fame).

== NBA career statistics ==
Legend
GP	Games played	GS	Games started	MPG	Minutes per game
FG%	Field goal percentage	3P%	3-point field goal percentage	FT%	Free throw percentage
RPG	Rebounds per game	APG	Assists per game	SPG	Steals per game
BPG	Blocks per game	PPG	Points per game	**Bold**	Career high

=== Regular season ===
Year	Team	GP	GS	MPG	FG%	3P%	FT%	RPG	APG	SPG	BPG	PPG
1977–78	Kansas City	73	—	25.7	.492	—	.697	2.4	2.4	1.0	.2	15.8
1978–79	Kansas City	**82**	—	34.6	.509	—	**.725**	**4.3**	3.4	1.5	.2	21.7
1979–80	Kansas City	**82**	—	35.2	.505	.278	.694	4.0	2.5	**1.7**	**.3**	22.7
1980–81	Kansas City	71	—	**36.5**	**.544**	.286	.697	3.6	3.3	1.3	**.3**	**24.6**
1981–82	New Jersey	37	22	27.7	.469	.000	.583	2.6	3.4	.8	.1	14.2
1982–83	New Jersey	62	54	30.4	.511	.333	.566	2.4	3.9	1.4	**.3**	15.1
1983–84	New Jersey	69	57	31.4	.508	.250	.608	2.5	3.9	1.2	.2	19.8
1984–85	New Jersey	56	45	32.9	.511	.190	.622	2.6	**4.1**	1.5	.1	20.6
1985–86	New Jersey	77	74	31.1	.513	**.364**	.581	2.6	3.4	1.1	.2	15.8
1986–87	New Jersey	7	6	18.1	.452	.000	.667	1.0	2.4	.4	.0	6.3
1987–88	New Jersey	67	59	28.1	.458	.360	.511	2.5	3.3	.8	.2	10.9
1988–89	Boston	13	0	8.3	.500	.333	.000	1.0	.7	.2	.1	2.8
Career		696	317	31.1	.506	.274	.655	3.0	3.2	1.2	.2	18.0
All-Star		4	0	13.0	.375	—	.500	1.5	.5	.8	.0	3.5

=== Playoffs ===
Year	Team	GP	GS	MPG	FG%	3P%	FT%	RPG	APG	SPG	BPG	PPG
1979	Kansas City	5	—	33.6	.513	—	**.711**	3.6	1.8	**2.0**	.0	21.0
1980	Kansas City	3	—	37.6	.484	.000	.429	**7.7**	2.3	1.3	.0	22.0
1981	Kansas City	8	—	29.3	**.571**	**1.000**	.611	2.6	3.4	1.5	.0	15.5
1983	New Jersey	2	—	18.5	.375	.000	.500	1.0	**4.5**	1.5	.0	6.5
1984	New Jersey	**11**	—	35.2	.415	.000	.521	2.4	3.7	1.8	.1	15.2
1986	New Jersey	3	3	**44.0**	.527	.000	.579	4.0	3.3	**2.0**	**1.0**	**23.0**
1989	Boston	3	1	6.7	.200	.000	—	.7	.3	.3	.3	.7
Career		35	4	31.1	.480	.091	.583	3.0	3.0	1.6	.1	15.6
