= 1981–82 Dallas Mavericks season =

NBA professional basketball team season

- Head coach: Dick Motta
- General manager: Norm Sonju
- Owner: Don Carter
- Arena: Reunion Arena

Results
- Record: 28–54 (.341)
- Place: Division: 5th (Midwest); Conference: 10th (Western)
- Playoff finish: Did not qualify
- Stats at Basketball Reference

Local media
- Television: WFAA; KTXA
- Radio: KJIM

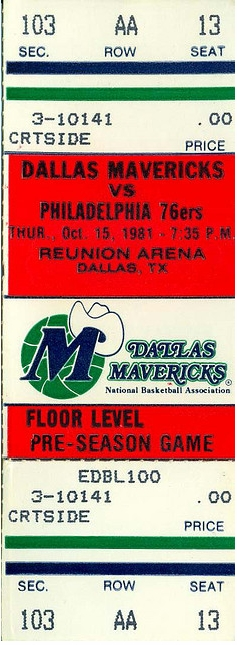
A ticket for an October 1981 pre-season game between the Mavericks and the season's eventual Eastern Conference champions Philadelphia 76ers.

The 1981–82 Dallas Mavericks season was the second season of the franchise in the National Basketball Association (NBA). Rookie Jay Vincent led the team in scoring with 21.4 points per game and earned NBA All-Rookie Team honors. The Mavericks improved to 28–54, getting out of the Midwest Division cellar as they finished above the Utah Jazz.

== Draft picks ==
The 1981 NBA draft brought three players who would become vital parts of the team. The Mavs selected 6'6" forward Mark Aguirre with the first pick, 6'6" guard Rolando Blackman 9th, and 6'7" forward Jay Vincent 24th. By the end of his seven-year Mavs career, Aguirre would average 24.6 points per game. Blackman contributed 19.2 points over his 11-year career in Dallas.

Round	Pick	Player	Position	Nationality	College
1	1	Mark Aguirre	SF	United States	DePaul
1	9	Rolando Blackman	SG	United States	Kansas State
2	24	Jay Vincent	SF	United States	Michigan State
2	43	Elston Turner	SG/SF	United States	Mississippi
3	47	Art Housey		United States	Kansas
4	70	Eddie Moss		United States	Syracuse
5	93	Pete Budko		United States	North Carolina

== Roster ==
1981–82 Dallas Mavericks roster
Players

Pos.	No.	Player	Height	Weight	DOB	From
SF	24	Mark Aguirre	6 ft 6 in (1.98 m)	232 lb (105 kg)	1959–12–10	DePaul
SG	22	Rolando Blackman	6 ft 6 in (1.98 m)	190 lb (86 kg)	1959–02–26	Kansas State
SF	23	Allan Bristow	6 ft 7 in (2.01 m)	210 lb (95 kg)	1951–08–23	Virginia Tech
C	43	Wayne Cooper	6 ft 10 in (2.08 m)	220 lb (100 kg)	1956–11–16	LSU New Orleans
PG	15	Brad Davis	6 ft 3 in (1.91 m)	180 lb (82 kg)	1955–12–17	Maryland
PF	53	Clarence Kea	6 ft 6 in (1.98 m)	218 lb (99 kg)	1959–02–02	Lamar
C	25	Tom LaGarde	6 ft 10 in (2.08 m)	220 lb (100 kg)	1955–02–10	North Carolina
PF	44	Scott Lloyd	6 ft 10 in (2.08 m)	230 lb (104 kg)	1952–12–19	Arizona State
C	40	Kurt Nimphius	6 ft 10 in (2.08 m)	218 lb (99 kg)	1958–03–13	Arizona State
SG	34	Jim Spanarkel	6 ft 5 in (1.96 m)	190 lb (86 kg)	1957–06–28	Duke
SF	33	Elston Turner	6 ft 5 in (1.96 m)	190 lb (86 kg)	1959–06–10	Mississippi
PF	31	Jay Vincent	6 ft 7 in (2.01 m)	220 lb (100 kg)	1959–06–10	Michigan State

Coaches
Head coach
- Dick Motta
Assistant(s)
- Bob Weiss

Legend
- (DP) Unsigned draft pick
- (FA) Free agent
- (S) Suspended
- Injured

Roster
Updated: December 28, 1981

== Regular season ==
=== Season standings ===
Midwest Division	W	L	PCT	GB	Home	Road	Div
y-San Antonio Spurs	48	34	.585	–	29–12	19–22	20–10
x-Denver Nuggets	46	36	.561	2.0	29–12	17–24	19–11
x-Houston Rockets	46	36	.561	2.0	25–16	21–20	17–13
Kansas City Kings	30	52	.366	18.0	23–18	7–34	11–19
Dallas Mavericks	28	54	.341	20.0	16–25	12–29	11–19
Utah Jazz	25	57	.305	23.0	18–23	7–34	9–21

#	Western Conference				
#	Team	W	L	PCT	GB
1	c-Los Angeles Lakers	57	25	.695	–
2	y-San Antonio Spurs	48	34	.585	9
3	x-Seattle SuperSonics	52	30	.634	5
4	x-Denver Nuggets	46	36	.561	11
5	x-Phoenix Suns	46	36	.561	11
6	x-Houston Rockets	46	36	.561	11
7	Golden State Warriors	45	37	.549	12
8	Portland Trail Blazers	42	40	.512	15
9	Kansas City Kings	30	52	.366	27
10	Dallas Mavericks	28	54	.341	29
11	Utah Jazz	25	57	.305	32
12	San Diego Clippers	17	65	.207	40

== Game log ==
=== Regular season ===
1981–82 game log
Total: 28–54 (Home: 0–0; Road: 0–0)
October: 0–0 (home: 0–0; road: 0–0)

Game	Date	Team	Score	High points	High rebounds	High assists	Location Attendance	Record

November: 0–0 (home: 0–0; road: 0–0)

Game	Date	Team	Score	High points	High rebounds	High assists	Location Attendance	Record
6	November 8; 9:00 p.m. CST	@Los Angeles	L 111–121	Aguirre (23)	LaGarde (11)	Davis (7)	The Forum; 9,870	1–5
13	November 24; 7:35 p.m. CST	Los Angeles	L 110–125	Vincent (20)	Vincent (13)	Davis (9)	Reunion Arena; 14,266	1–12
14	November 25; 8:35 p.m. CST	@ Denver	L 133–139	Aguirre (31)	LaGarde (8)	Davis (15)	McNichols Sports Arena; 8,533	1–13

December: 0–0 (home: 0–0; road: 0–0)

Game	Date	Team	Score	High points	High rebounds	High assists	Location Attendance	Record
18	December 5; 7:35 p.m. CST	Denver	W 109–105	Aguirre (26)	Turner (8)	Davis (13)	Reunion Arena; 7,620	3–15
24	December 16; 6:30 p.m. CST	@ Boston	L 92–109	Vincent (27)	LaGarde (9)	Davis, Lloyd, Spanarkel, Turner (4)	Boston Garden; 15,320	5–19
28	December 26; 7:35 p.m. CST	Denver	L 117–124	Vincent (33)	Cooper, Nimphius, Vincent (8)	Bristow, Davis (7)	Reunion Arena; 9,580	6–22

January: 0–0 (home: 0–0; road: 0–0)

Game	Date	Team	Score	High points	High rebounds	High assists	Location Attendance	Record
36	January 15; 8:35 p.m. CST	@ Denver	L 113–128	Vincent (22)	Bristow, Cooper (8)	Bristow (7)	McNichols Sports Arena; 7,990	9–27

February: 0–0 (home: 0–0; road: 0–0)

Game	Date	Team	Score	High points	High rebounds	High assists	Location Attendance	Record

March: 0–0 (home: 0–0; road: 0–0)

Game	Date	Team	Score	High points	High rebounds	High assists	Location Attendance	Record
57	March 2; 7:35 p.m. CST	Boston	L 97–101	Vincent (31)	Bristow, Cooper (8)	Bristow (12)	Reunion Arena; 17,134	19–38
64	March 14; 9:00 p.m. CST	@ Los Angeles	L 116–138	Blackman (25)	Vincent (7)	Davis (6)	The Forum; 13,000	22–42
66	March 19; 7:35 p.m. CST	Los Angeles	L 106–112	Vincent (22)	Vincent (13)	Cooper (5)	Reunion Arena; 17,134	22–44
68	March 23; 9:30 p.m. CST	@ Los Angeles	W 118–116	Aguirre (23)	Vincent (10)	Spanarkel (7)	The Forum; 13,516	23–45
73	March 31; 7:35 p.m. CST	Denver	L 119–120	Vincent (31)	Cooper (10)	Bristow (14)	Reunion Arena; 7,322	24–49

April: 0–0 (home: 0–0; road: 0–0)

Game	Date	Team	Score	High points	High rebounds	High assists	Location Attendance	Record
82	April 17; 8:35 p.m. CST	@ Denver	L 124–130	Vincent (26)	Aguirre, Vincent (9)	Bristow (10)	McNichols Sports Arena; 17,009	28–54

1981–82 schedule

== Player statistics ==
=== Ragular season ===
Player	POS	GP	GS	MP	REB	AST	STL	BLK	PTS	MPG	RPG	APG	SPG	BPG	PPG
Brad Davis	PG	82	82	2,614	226	509	73	6	993	31.9	2.8	6.2	.9	.1	12.1
Allan Bristow	SF	82	54	2,035	339	448	65	6	573	24.8	4.1	5.5	.8	.1	7.0
Rolando Blackman	SG	82	16	1,979	254	105	46	30	1,091	24.1	3.1	1.3	.6	.4	13.3
Jim Spanarkel	SG	82	1	1,755	210	206	86	9	827	21.4	2.6	2.5	1.0	.1	10.1
Jay Vincent	PF	81	62	2,626	565	176	89	22	1,732	32.4	7.0	2.2	1.1	.3	21.4
Elston Turner	SF	80	62	1,996	301	189	75	2	661	25.0	3.8	2.4	.9	.0	8.3
Wayne Cooper	C	76	38	1,818	550	115	37	106	682	23.9	7.2	1.5	.5	1.4	9.0
Scott Lloyd	PF	74	17	1,047	163	67	15	7	287	14.1	2.2	.9	.2	.1	3.9
Kurt Nimphius	C	63	27	1,085	295	61	17	82	337	17.2	4.7	1.0	.3	1.3	5.3
Mark Aguirre	SF	51	20	1,468	249	164	37	22	955	28.8	4.9	3.2	.7	.4	18.7
Tom LaGarde	C	47	28	909	210	49	17	17	312	19.3	4.5	1.0	.4	.4	6.6
Clarence Kea	PF	35	0	248	61	14	4	3	81	7.1	1.7	.4	.1	.1	2.3
Oliver Mack	SG	13	3	150	18	14	5	1	44	11.5	1.4	1.1	.4	.1	3.4

== Awards and records ==
=== Awards ===
- Jay Vincent, NBA All-Rookie Team 1st Team

== Transactions ==
=== Trades ===
August 20, 1981
To Dallas Mavericks----
- Allan Bristow
- Wayne Cooper
To Utah Jazz----
- Bill Robinzine

=== Free agents ===
==== Additions ====
Player	Signed	Former team
Kurt Nimphius	September 2, 1981	Denver Nuggets

==== Subtractions ====
Player	Left	New team
Stan Pietkiewicz	July 24, 1981	
Abdul Jeelani	October 5, 1981	
Chad Kinch	October 5, 1981	
Ollie Mack	December 22, 1981	

== See also ==
- 1981–82 NBA season
