= 1977 NCAA Men's Basketball All-Americans =

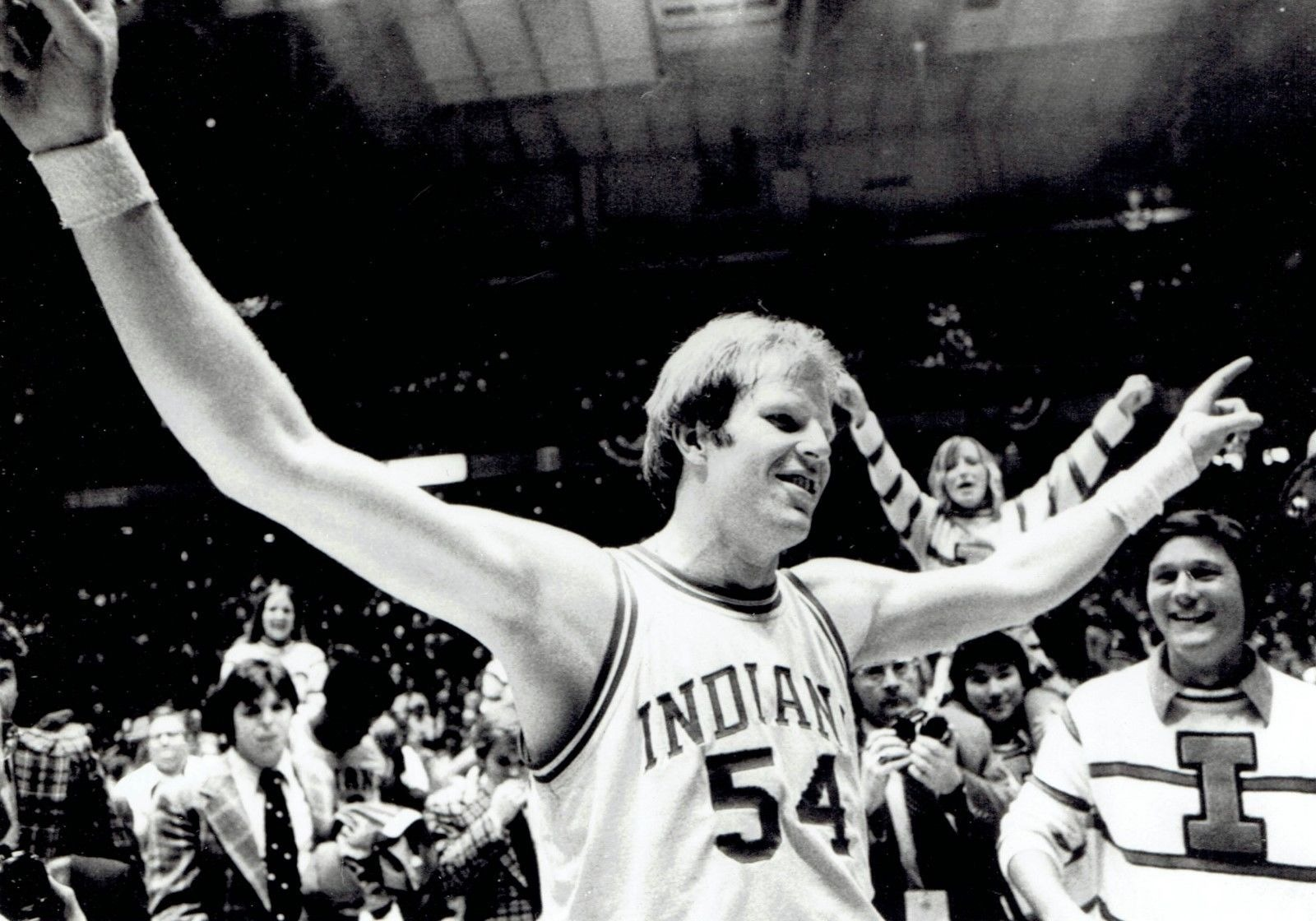
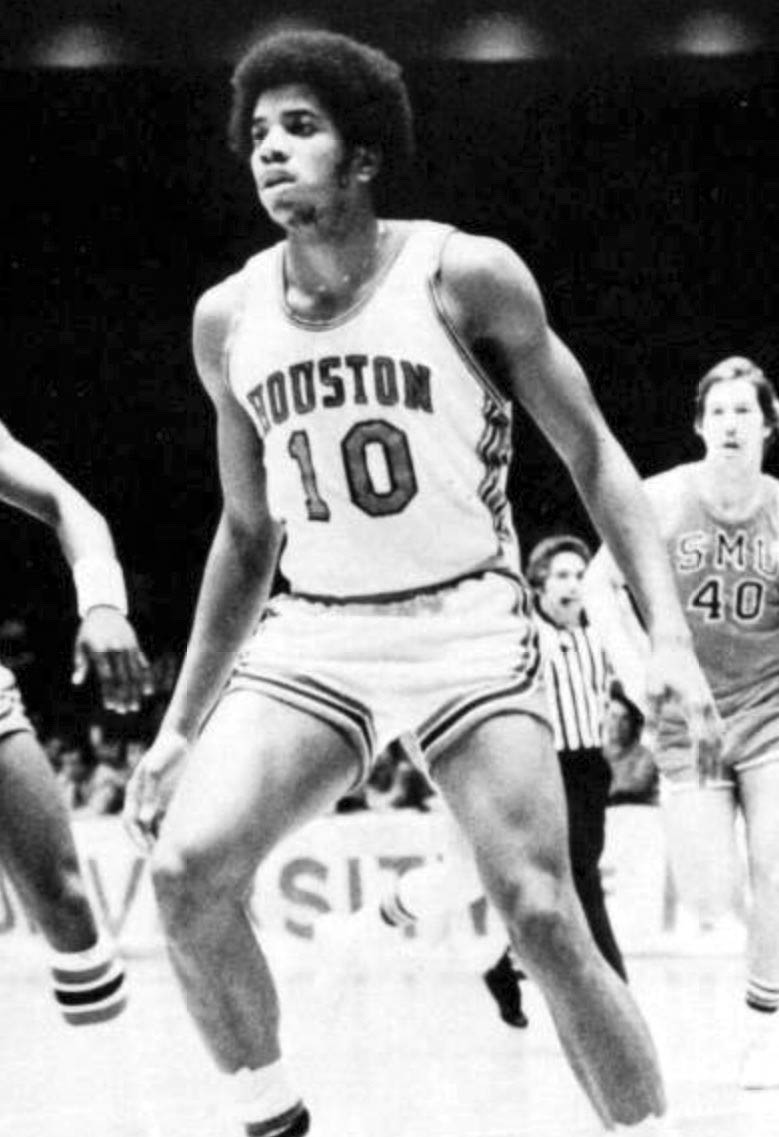
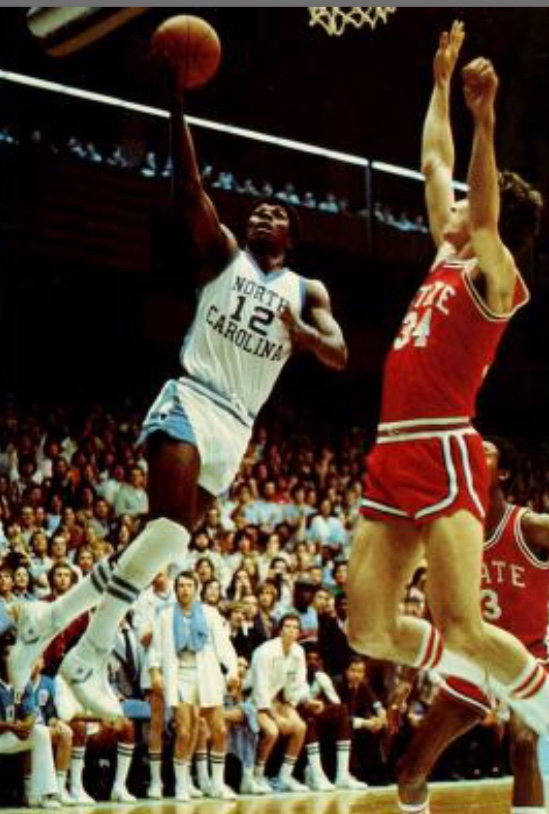
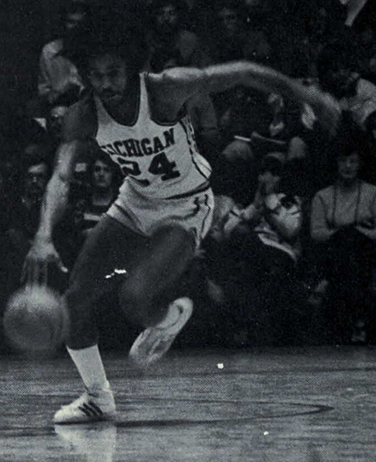
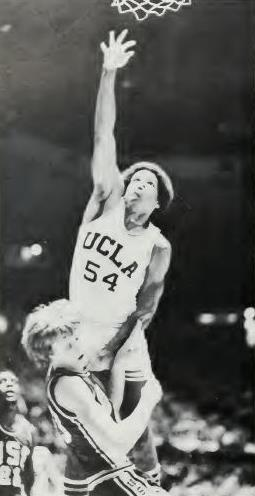
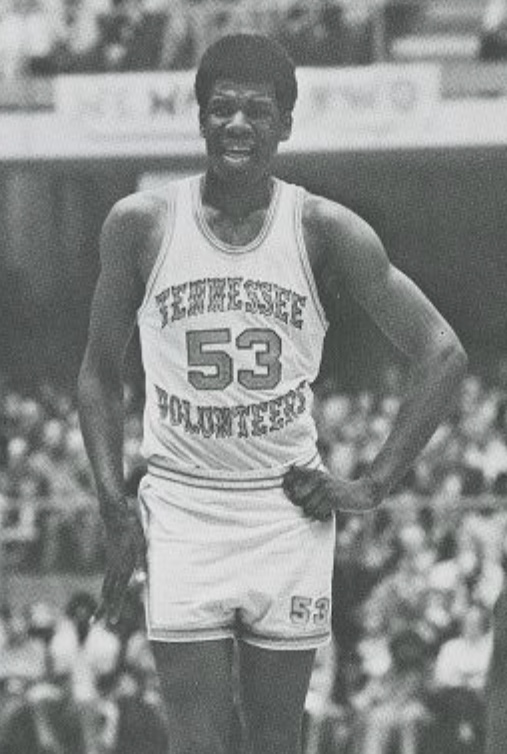
- The 1977 consensus first team. Clockwise from top left: Benson, Birdsong, Ford, King, Johnson, Green.
- Awarded for: 1976–77 NCAA Division I men's basketball season

The consensus 1977 College Basketball All-American team, as determined by aggregating the results of four major All-American teams. To earn "consensus" status, a player must win honors from a majority of the following teams: the Associated Press, the USBWA, The United Press International and the National Association of Basketball Coaches.

== 1977 Consensus All-America team ==
Consensus First Team
Player	Position	Class	Team
Kent Benson	C	Senior	Indiana
Otis Birdsong	G	Senior	Houston
Phil Ford	G	Junior	North Carolina
Rickey Green	G	Senior	Michigan
Marques Johnson	F	Senior	UCLA
Bernard King	F	Junior	Tennessee

Consensus Second Team
Player	Position	Class	Team
Greg Ballard	F	Senior	Oregon
Bill Cartwright	C	Sophomore	San Francisco
Rod Griffin	G	Junior	Wake Forest
Ernie Grunfeld	F	Senior	Tennessee
Phil Hubbard	F	Senior	Michigan
Butch Lee	G	Junior	Marquette
Mychal Thompson	F/C	Junior	Minnesota

== Individual All-America teams ==
All-America Team
All-America Team	First team		Second team		Third team		Fourth Team		Fifth Team	
All-America Team	Player	School	Player	School	Player	School	Player	School	Player	School
Associated Press	Kent Benson	Indiana	Otis Birdsong	Houston	Bo Ellis	Marquette	No fourth or fifth teams			
Associated Press	Phil Ford	North Carolina	Bill Cartwright	San Francisco	Rod Griffin	Wake Forest	No fourth or fifth teams			
Associated Press	Rickey Green	Michigan	Ernie Grunfeld	Tennessee	Phil Hubbard	Michigan	No fourth or fifth teams			
Associated Press	Marques Johnson	UCLA	Butch Lee	Marquette	Tree Rollins	Clemson	No fourth or fifth teams			
Associated Press	Bernard King	Tennessee	Mychal Thompson	Minnesota	Freeman Williams	Portland State	No fourth or fifth teams			
USBWA	Otis Birdsong	Houston	Greg Ballard	Oregon	No third, fourth or fifth teams					
USBWA	Phil Ford	North Carolina	Rod Griffin	Wake Forest	No third, fourth or fifth teams					
USBWA	Rickey Green	Michigan	Ernie Grunfeld	Tennessee	No third, fourth or fifth teams					
USBWA	Phil Hubbard	Michigan	Marques Johnson	UCLA	No third, fourth or fifth teams					
USBWA	Mychal Thompson	Minnesota	Bernard King	Tennessee	No third, fourth or fifth teams					
NABC	Kent Benson	Indiana	Bo Ellis	Marquette	Greg Ballard	Oregon	Skip Brown	Wake Forest	Rod Griffin	Wake Forest
NABC	Otis Birdsong	Houston	Ernie Grunfeld	Tennessee	Larry Bird	Indiana State	Kenny Carr	NC State	Tony Hanson	Connecticut
NABC	Phil Ford	North Carolina	Phil Hubbard	Michigan	Winford Boynes	San Francisco	Bob Elliott	Arizona	Jeff Jonas	Utah
NABC	Rickey Green	Michigan	Bernard King	Tennessee	Bill Cartwright	San Francisco	Jack Givens	Kentucky	Cedric Maxwell	UNC Charlotte
NABC	Marques Johnson	UCLA	Mychal Thompson	Minnesota	Joe Hassett	Providence	Rick Robey	Kentucky	Anthony Roberts	Oral Roberts
NABC					Butch Lee	Marquette			Tree Rollins	Clemson
UPI	Kent Benson	Indiana	Bill Cartwright	San Francisco	Larry Bird	Indiana State	No fourth or fifth teams			
UPI	Otis Birdsong	Houston	Phil Ford	North Carolina	Kenny Carr	NC State	No fourth or fifth teams			
UPI	Rickey Green	Michigan	Ernie Grunfeld	Tennessee	Rod Griffin	Wake Forest	No fourth or fifth teams			
UPI	Marques Johnson	UCLA	Butch Lee	Marquette	Cedric Maxwell	UNC Charlotte	No fourth or fifth teams			
UPI	Bernard King	Tennessee	Mychal Thompson	Minnesota	Freeman Williams	Portland State	No fourth or fifth teams			

AP Honorable Mention:

- Greg Ballard, Oregon
- Larry Bird, Indiana State
- Winford Boynes, San Francisco
- Skip Brown, Wake Forest
- Kenny Carr, NC State
- Wesley Cox, Louisville
- Brad Davis, Maryland
- Walter Davis, North Carolina
- Marvin Delph, Arkansas
- T. R. Dunn, Alabama
- Bob Elliott, Arizona
- Mike Evans, Kansas State
- Jack Givens, Kentucky
- Mike Glenn, Southern Illinois
- Steve Grant, Manhattan
- David Greenwood, UCLA
- Tony Hanson, Connecticut
- James Hardy, San Francisco
- Joe Hassett, Providence
- Don Henderson, Arkansas State
- Matt Hicks, Northern Illinois
- John Irving, Hofstra
- Eddie Johnson, Auburn
- Jeff Jonas, Utah
- Reggie King, Alabama
- Tom LaGarde, North Carolina
- Rich Laurel, Hofstra
- Cedric Maxwell, UNC Charlotte
- Glenn Mosley, Seton Hall
- Calvin Natt, Northeast Louisiana
- Eddie Owens, UNLV
- Bruce Parkinson, Purdue
- Ron Perry, Holy Cross
- Anthony Roberts, Oral Roberts
- Rick Robey, Kentucky
- Steve Sheppard, Maryland
- Andrew Toney, Southwestern Louisiana
- Wilson Washington, Old Dominion
- Glen Williams, St. John's
- Ray Williams, Minnesota
- Gary Winton, Army

== See also ==
- 1976–77 NCAA Division I men's basketball season
