= Wayne Cooper (basketball) =

American basketball player (1956–2022)

Personal information
- Born: November 16, 1956 Milan, Georgia, U.S.
- Died: April 11, 2022 (aged 65)
- Listed height: 6 ft 10 in (2.08 m)
- Listed weight: 220 lb (100 kg)

Career information
- High school: Telfair County (McRae, Georgia)
- College: New Orleans (1974–1978)
- NBA draft: 1978: 2nd round, 40th overall pick
- Drafted by: Golden State Warriors
- Playing career: 1978–1992
- Position: Center
- Number: 43, 40, 42

Career history
- 1978–1980: Golden State Warriors
- 1980–1981: Utah Jazz
- 1981–1982: Dallas Mavericks
- 1982–1984: Portland Trail Blazers
- 1984–1989: Denver Nuggets
- 1989–1992: Portland Trail Blazers

Career highlights
- Sun Belt Player of the Year (1978); 2× First-team All-Sun Belt (1977, 1978)

Career NBA statistics
- Points: 7,777 (7.9 ppg)
- Rebounds: 6,095 (6.2 rpg)
- Blocks: 1,535 (1.6 bpg)
- Stats at NBA.com
- Stats at Basketball Reference

Artis Wayne Cooper (November 16, 1956 – April 11, 2022) was an American professional basketball player who played fourteen seasons in the National Basketball Association (NBA). Nicknamed "Coop", he played for the Golden State Warriors, Utah Jazz, Dallas Mavericks, Portland Trail Blazers, and Denver Nuggets from 1978 to 1992. He was the Denver Nuggets’ all-time leader in blocks when he left the franchise in 1989. After his playing career ended, he worked as an executive with the Trail Blazers and Sacramento Kings.

== Early life ==
Cooper was born in Milan, Georgia, on November 16, 1956. He attended Telfair County High School in his home county. He then studied at University of New Orleans (UNO) after being scouted by its associate coach, Don Smith, who described Cooper as a "tall, skinny kid who could really shoot". He played basketball for the New Orleans Privateers from 1974 and 1978. As a sophomore, he averaged 12.1 points per game (PPG) and a team-leading 9.4 rebounds per game (RPG), to go along with a .504 field goal percentage and a .723 free throw percentage. He then bettered his PPG to 13.2 and RPG to 10.1 the following year. During his senior year in 1977–78, Cooper recorded 18.1 PPG and 12.7 RPG as the Privateers won the Sun Belt tournament championship. He also established school records of most consecutive games with double-digit rebounding totals (13) and most consecutive games with a double-double (11) that year. Cooper received two All-Sun Belt selections during his college career and was honored as Sun Belt Player of the Year as a senior. He was selected in the 2nd round of the 1978 NBA draft by the Golden State Warriors.

== Career ==
Cooper made his NBA debut on October 14, 1978, scoring two points to go along with two rebounds against the San Diego Clippers. He played 65 games during his rookie season, averaging 4.6 PPG. After improving his PPG to 11.0 in the 1979–80 season and finishing ninth in offensive rebound percentage (12.1) in the NBA, he was traded to the Utah Jazz on September 11, 1980, in exchange for Bernard King. He was traded again less than a year later to the Dallas Mavericks, together with Allan Bristow, for Bill Robinzine. Cooper was subsequently traded for the third time in three seasons on June 28, 1982, to the Portland Trail Blazers in exchange for Kelvin Ransey.

In the 1983 NBA playoffs, his first playoff appearance, Cooper played a key role in the Trail Blazers sweeping the Seattle SuperSonics in the first round by averaging 12 points, 10 rebounds, and 2 blocks a game in the series. However, the Trail Blazers ultimately lost in the semifinals to the Los Angeles Lakers. He was eventually traded with Fat Lever and Calvin Natt to the Denver Nuggets on June 7, 1984, in exchange for Kiki VanDeWeghe. In his first season with the franchise, Cooper recorded the second-highest block percentage (5.4) in the NBA behind Mark Eaton, as well as fourth-most blocks (197) and fourth-highest blocks per game (2.5).

During the 1985–86 season – arguably Cooper's best season as a professional – he started 78 games for the Nuggets and averaged 13.1 points, 7.8 rebounds, and 2.9 blocks per game. He finished third in the league in block percentage (5.9), fourth in blocks (227), and fourth in blocks per game. He also committed the third-highest number of personal fouls (315). Also that season, on December 11, 1985, he blocked a then-career-high 9 shots in a 134–95 win against the Los Angeles Clippers. He subsequently bettered that mark on December 30, 1988, when he blocked 10 shots in a 109–83 over the Miami Heat. He had the third-highest block percentage (6.4), sixth-most blocks (211), seventh-highest blocks per game (2.7), and tenth-highest total rebound percentage (17.1) in the league in 1988–89. Cooper became an unrestricted free agent at the end of that season, whereupon he returned to the Trail Blazers. He later appeared in the 1990 NBA Finals and 1992 NBA Finals, both with the Trail Blazers. The franchise lost to the Detroit Pistons and Chicago Bulls, respectively. Throughout his NBA career, Cooper played in 984 games and scored a total of 7,777 points in the regular season.

== NBA career statistics ==
Legend
GP	Games played	GS	Games started	MPG	Minutes per game
FG%	Field goal percentage	3P%	3-point field goal percentage	FT%	Free throw percentage
RPG	Rebounds per game	APG	Assists per game	SPG	Steals per game
BPG	Blocks per game	PPG	Points per game	**Bold**	Career high

=== Regular season ===
Year	Team	GP	GS	MPG	FG%	3P%	FT%	RPG	APG	SPG	BPG	PPG
1978–79	Golden State	65	—	12.2	.437	—	.672	4.3	.3	.1	.7	4.6
1979–80	Golden State	79	—	22.5	.489	.250	.751	6.4	.5	.3	1.0	11.0
1980–81	Utah	71	—	20.0	.452	.333	.689	6.2	.7	.3	.7	6.9
1981–82	Dallas	76	38	23.9	.420	.125	.744	7.2	**1.5**	**.5**	1.4	9.0
1982–83	Portland	80	60	26.2	.443	.000	.685	7.6	**1.5**	.3	1.7	9.7
1983–84	Portland	**81**	38	20.5	**.524**	.000	**.805**	5.9	.9	.3	1.3	9.8
1984–85	Denver	80	**78**	25.4	.472	.000	.685	**7.9**	1.1	.4	2.5	12.1
1985–86	Denver	78	**78**	**27.1**	.466	**.429**	.795	7.8	1.0	**.5**	**2.9**	**13.1**
1986–87	Denver	69	64	22.6	.448	.000	.725	6.9	1.0	.2	1.5	8.0
1987–88	Denver	45	32	19.2	.437	.000	.746	6.0	.7	.3	2.1	6.4
1988–89	Denver	79	72	23.6	.495	.250	.745	7.8	1.0	**.5**	2.7	6.6
1989–90	Portland	79	0	14.9	.454	.000	.641	4.3	.6	.2	1.2	3.8
1990–91	Portland	67	1	11.1	.393	.000	.786	2.8	.3	.1	.9	2.2
1991–92	Portland	35	0	9.8	.427	—	.636	2.9	.6	.1	.8	2.2
Career		984	461	20.6	.457	.146	.736	6.2	.9	.3	1.6	7.9

=== Playoffs ===
Year	Team	GP	GS	MPG	FG%	3P%	FT%	RPG	APG	SPG	BPG	PPG
1983	Portland	7	—	**32.6**	.486	—	.882	**8.0**	**1.3**	.3	1.1	**12.4**
1984	Portland	5	—	20.8	.370	—	.500	4.0	.8	.2	.8	4.8
1985	Denver	15	**12**	21.4	.469	—	.750	6.2	**1.3**	**.5**	**2.4**	10.9
1986	Denver	8	4	19.3	.429	.000	.682	5.0	.9	.3	.6	7.9
1987	Denver	3	1	13.7	.417	—	**1.000**	5.7	.7	.0	.3	4.0
1988	Denver	9	0	10.7	.348	—	**1.000**	3.7	.7	.3	.9	2.0
1989	Denver	3	3	14.7	**.500**	—	—	4.3	.7	.3	.7	4.0
1990	Portland	**18**	0	13.8	.404	—	.526	3.9	.3	.3	1.6	2.7
1991	Portland	3	0	4.3	**.500**	—	—	1.7	.3	.0	.0	.7
1992	Portland	3	0	9.0	**.500**	—	—	2.7	.0	.0	1.0	1.3
Career		74	20	17.2	.445	.000	.709	4.8	.8	.3	1.3	5.9

== Later life ==
After retiring as a player at the end of the 1991–92 season, Cooper remained with the Trail Blazers and worked in its front office for two years. He subsequently became an assistant coach and director of basketball services of the Sacramento Kings in 1994. Two years later, he was promoted to vice president of basketball operations and served in that capacity until 2013.

Cooper was part of the inaugural class inducted into the University of New Orleans Hall of Fame in 1988. Four years later, he was enshrined in the Louisiana Association of Basketball Coaches Hall of Fame. He was named to the Sun Belt Conference's All-Time Men's Basketball Team in 1995. He was later inducted into the Greater New Orleans Sports Foundation Hall of Fame in 2000. Prior to the 2019–20 season, Cooper finished runner-up in voting by a panel of New Orleans basketball experts to determine the greatest basketball player in Privateers history. At the time of his death, he was ranked second all-time at UNO in double-doubles (44), third in career rebounds (920), and fifteenth in career points (1,209).

== Personal life ==
Cooper was married to Denise until his death. They had three daughters together.

Cooper died on April 11, 2022. He was 65, and suffered from kidney disease prior to his death.

== See also ==
- List of National Basketball Association career blocks leaders
