= Allan Bristow =

American basketball player and coach (born 1951)

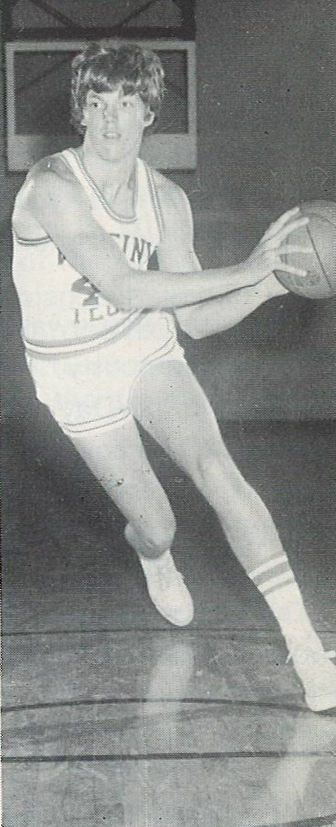
- Bristow, c. 1972

Personal information
- Born: August 23, 1951 (age 75) Richmond, Virginia, U.S.
- Listed height: 6 ft 7 in (2.01 m)
- Listed weight: 210 lb (95 kg)

Career information
- High school: Henrico (Richmond, Virginia)
- College: Virginia Tech (1970–1973)
- NBA draft: 1973: 2nd round, 21st overall pick
- Drafted by: Philadelphia 76ers
- Playing career: 1973–1983
- Position: Small forward
- Number: 44, 30, 23
- Coaching career: 1983–1996

Career history

Playing
- 1973–1975: Philadelphia 76ers
- 1975–1979: San Antonio Spurs
- 1979–1981: Utah Jazz
- 1981–1983: Dallas Mavericks

Coaching
- 1983–1984: San Antonio Spurs (assistant)
- 1984–1990: Denver Nuggets (assistant)
- 1991–1996: Charlotte Hornets

Career highlights
- No. 44 retired by Virginia Tech Hokies

Career ABA and NBA playing statistics
- Points: 5,450 (7.8 ppg)
- Rebounds: 2,787 (4.0 rpg)
- Assists: 2,219 (3.2 apg)
- Stats at NBA.com
- Stats at Basketball Reference

Career coaching record
- NBA: 207–203 (.505)
- Record at Basketball Reference

Allan Mercer Bristow Jr. (born August 23, 1951) is an American former professional basketball player, coach, and executive. Bristow played college basketball for the Virginia Tech Hokies, and was selected by the Philadelphia 76ers in the second round of the 1973 NBA draft. A 6 ft 7 in, 210 lb (95 kg) small forward, he had a 10-year career in both the National Basketball Association (NBA) and the American Basketball Association (ABA), playing for the Sixers, the San Antonio Spurs (in both leagues), the Utah Jazz, and finishing his playing career with the Dallas Mavericks. His nickname was "Disco".

In 1991, Bristow was hired to be the third head coach for the recently created Charlotte Hornets franchise, a position he held for five years. Led by players such as Larry Johnson and Alonzo Mourning, the Hornets were the first of the late-1980s expansion teams to be successful, reaching the playoffs in 1993 and 1995. Bristow resigned in 1996.

Bristow became the New Orleans Hornets' general manager in 2004, a position he relinquished in 2005.

In 1997, Bristow was inducted into the Virginia Sports Hall of Fame.

== Virginia Tech career ==
After being an all-state player at Henrico High School, Bristow was recruited to play college basketball for Virginia Tech coach Howie Shannon beginning in the 1969–70 season. Bristow averaged 27.3 points and 17.1 rebounds per game as a freshman on the JV/Freshmen. (At the time he began his career, freshmen could not play on the varsity team). Bristow averaged 20.4 points and 13.1 rebounds per game for the 1970–71 Hokies that finished 14–11. He was second on the team in scoring that season to Loyd King (21.3 ppg), marking the only time that two Hokies ever averaged over 20 points in a single season.

Don DeVoe took over as coach of the Hokies for the 1971–72 season, and Bristow led the team with 25.0 points and 13.4 rebounds in a 16–10 effort.

In 1972–73, the Hokies raced to an 18–5 regular season mark, and a berth in the NIT. (At the time, only 32 teams made the NCAA tournament). Tech beat three teams by four points in the preliminary rounds before facing Notre Dame under legendary coach Digger Phelps in the finals. Tech forced overtime against the heavily favored Fighting Irish, and then found themselves down by one as they took the ball in bounds with 12 seconds to play. Bobby Stevens took a shot from just above the foul-line with about six seconds left, and chased his own rebound down on the right corner where he turned and beat the buzzer for a 92–91 win. Bristow scored a total of 91 points in the four NIT games. Including the NIT, Bristow led the team with a 23.9 points per game average and also pulled down 11.6 rebounds per contest.

Bristow paced the Virginia Tech basketball team to the 1973 National Invitation Tournament (NIT) championship, and became the fourth Tech basketball player to have his jersey retired by the university. Bristow still holds the Hokies’ single game marks of 52 points and 22 field goals which he accomplished in a 117–89 win against George Washington University. He also holds the record for most consecutive double-figure scoring games, reaching that mark in all 78 of his Hokie appearances. He finished as Tech's all-time scoring leader in 1973 with 1,804 points, and still stood seventh on the list at the beginning of the 2021–2022 season. Bristow also holds the Tech record for career scoring average at 23.1 points per game. He led the Hokies in rebounding all three of his varsity seasons and in scoring his final two years.

Bristow was named to the Virginia Tech Sports Hall of Fame in 1984 and his jersey was retired by the university in 1998.

== NBA playing career ==
Bristow was selected in the second round of the 1973 NBA draft (21st overall pick) by the Philadelphia 76ers. He made his NBA debut on October 13, 1973. Bristow played in 55 games in his rookie year averaging 11.7 minutes per game with 4.7 points per game and 3.0 rebounds per game with Philadelphia. After his second season, Bristow was waived by the 76ers. Bristow moved to the ABA's San Antonio Spurs for one season before the Spurs joined the NBA the following year in 1976. He spent four years total with San Antonio before signing as a free agent with the New Orleans Jazz in 1979. Bristow and Wayne Cooper were traded by the Jazz to the Dallas Mavericks in 1981 for Bill Robinzine. After two seasons with Dallas, Bristow retired from the NBA in 1983. Bristow had averages of 7.8 points, 5.0 rebounds, and 3.2 assists in 648 games.

== Executive and coaching career ==
Bristow began his professional coaching career as an assistant coach for the San Antonio Spurs in the 1983–84 season. He then moved to the Denver Nuggets as an assistant to coach Doug Moe for six seasons from 1984 to 1990. In 1990 the Charlotte Hornets named Bristow as Vice President of Basketball Operations, in charge of scouting, draft picks and trades. Bristow replaced Gene Littles as coach of the Charlotte Hornets in summer 1991, becoming the Hornets' third head coach. He was the first Hornets coach to bring major success to the franchise. He guided Charlotte to its first ever playoff appearance and first ever playoff series victory in the same year. His best season as head coach was in the 1994–95 season when the Hornets recorded a franchise-record 50 victories. He coached the Hornets team to a record of 207–203, but his teams were just 5–8 in the playoffs. In the 1996 off-season the Hornets ended his five-year run as their head coach by buying out the final year of Bristow's contract after the Hornets finished their season short of the playoffs with a 41–41 record. Bristow is the Hornets' second-winningest head coach with 207 regular season victories. Bristow later served as Executive Vice President of Basketball Operations for the Nuggets from 1997 to 1998.

== Career playing statistics ==
Legend
GP	Games played	GS	Games started	MPG	Minutes per game
FG%	Field goal percentage	3P%	3-point field goal percentage	FT%	Free throw percentage
RPG	Rebounds per game	APG	Assists per game	SPG	Steals per game
BPG	Blocks per game	PPG	Points per game	**Bold**	Career high

=== NBA/ABA ===
==== Regular season ====
Year	Team	GP	GS	MPG	FG%	3P%	FT%	RPG	APG	SPG	BPG	PPG
1973–74	Philadelphia	55	0	11.7	.400		.737	3.0	1.7	.5	.0	4.7
1974–75	Philadelphia	72	3	15.3	.415		.791	3.5	1.4	.3	.0	6.2
1975–76	San Antonio (ABA)	47		18.8	.461	.000	**.848**	3.7	2.6	.5	.0	7.0
1976–77	San Antonio	**82**		24.6	.489		.798	4.2	2.9	**1.1**	.0	11.4
1977–78	San Antonio	**82**		18.1	.478		.731	3.1	2.4	.8	.0	8.1
1978–79	San Antonio	74		17.9	**.492**		.832	3.3	3.1	.8	**.2**	6.4
1979–80	Utah	**82**		**28.1**	.480	.286	.811	**6.2**	4.2	**1.1**	.1	**10.6**
1980–81	Utah	**82**		22.4	.444	.278	.838	5.2	4.7	.8	.0	8.7
1981–82	Dallas	**82**	**54**	24.8	.437	.167	.817	4.1	**5.7**	.8	.1	7.0
1982–83	Dallas	37	0	10.0	.444	**.462**	.714	1.6	1.9	.2	.0	2.8
Career (NBA)		648	57	20.5	.460	.286	.798	4.0	3.2	.8	.1	7.9
Career (overall)		695	57	20.4	.460	.281	.801	4.0	3.2	.7	.1	7.8

==== Playoffs ====
Year	Team	GP	MPG	FG%	3P%	FT%	RPG	APG	SPG	BPG	PPG
1976	San Antonio (ABA)	7	13.9	.371	.000	**.792**	2.0	1.7	.7	.0	**6.4**
1977	San Antonio	2	**14.0**	.333		.222	2.0	**3.5**	**1.0**	.0	4.0
1978	San Antonio	5	10.2	**.600**		.667	**2.2**	1.4	.4	.0	4.4
1979	San Antonio	**13**	12.5	.408		.762	2.1	2.2	.7	**.4**	4.3
Career (NBA)		20	12.1	.438		.611	2.1	2.1	.7	.3	4.3
Career (overall)		27	12.6	.417	.000	.683	2.1	2.0	.7	.2	4.9

== Head coaching record ==
Legend
Regular season	G	Games coached	W	Games won	L	Games lost	W–L %	Win–loss %
Playoffs	PG	Playoff games	PW	Playoff wins	PL	Playoff losses	PW–L %	Playoff win–loss %

Team	Year	G	W	L	W–L%	Finish	PG	PW	PL	PW–L%	Result
Charlotte	1991–92	82	31	51	.378	6th in Central	–	–	–	–	Missed Playoffs
Charlotte	1992–93	82	44	38	.537	3rd in Central	9	4	5	.444	Lost in Conf. Semifinals
Charlotte	1993–94	82	41	41	.500	5th in Central	–	–	–	–	Missed Playoffs
Charlotte	1994–95	82	50	32	.610	2nd in Central	4	1	3	.250	Lost in First Round
Charlotte	1995–96	82	41	41	.500	6th in Central	–	–	–	–	Missed Playoffs
Career		410	207	203	.505		13	5	8	.385	
