= 1980–81 Dallas Mavericks season =

1st season of the Mavericks in NBA

- Head coach: Dick Motta
- General manager: Norm Sonju
- Owner: Don Carter
- Arena: Reunion Arena

Results
- Record: 15–67 (.183)
- Place: Division: 6th (Midwest); Conference: 12th (Western)
- Playoff finish: Did not qualify
- Stats at Basketball Reference

Local media
- Television: WFAA; KTXA
- Radio: KJIM

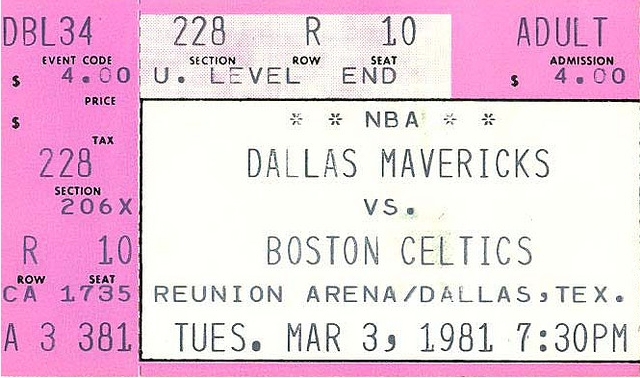
A ticket for a March 1981 game between the Dallas Mavericks and the season's eventual champions Boston Celtics.

The 1980–81 Dallas Mavericks season was the first season of the franchise in the National Basketball Association (NBA).

== Expansion draft ==
Player	Position	Team
Del Beshore	Guard	Chicago Bulls
Winford Boynes	Forward	New Jersey Nets
Alonzo Bradley	Forward	Houston Rockets
Mike Bratz	Guard	Phoenix Suns
Marty Byrnes	Forward	Los Angeles Lakers
Austin Carr	Guard	Cleveland Cavaliers
Jim Cleamons	Forward	Washington Bullets
Terry Duerod	Guard	Detroit Pistons
Jack Givens	Forward	Atlanta Hawks
Joe Hassett	Guard	Indiana Pacers
Geoff Huston	Guard	New York Knicks
Abdul Jeelani	Forward	Portland Trail Blazers
Jeff Judkins	Forward	Boston Celtics
Arvid Kramer	Center	Denver Nuggets
Tom LaGarde	Center	Seattle SuperSonics
Bill McKinney	Guard	Kansas City Kings
Wiley Peck	Guard	San Antonio Spurs
Bingo Smith	Guard	San Diego Clippers
Jim Spanarkel	Guard	Philadelphia 76ers
Raymond Townsend	Guard	Golden State Warriors
Richard Washington	Forward	Milwaukee Bucks
Jerome Whitehead	Center	Utah Jazz

== Draft picks ==
Round	Pick	Player	Position	Nationality	College
1	11	Kiki Vandeweghe	SF	United States	UCLA
2	34	Rossevelt Bouie	PG	United States	Syracuse
3	57	Dave Britton	SG	United States	Texas A&M

- Kiki Vandeweghe of UCLA was drafted by the Mavs with the 11th pick of the 1980 NBA draft, but Vandeweghe refused to play for the expansion Mavericks and staged a holdout that lasted a month into the team's inaugural season. Vandeweghe was traded to the Denver Nuggets, along with a first-round pick in 1981, in exchange for two future first-round picks

== Roster ==
1980–81 Dallas Mavericks roster
Players

Pos.	No.	Player	Height	Weight	DOB	From
SF	45	Marty Byrnes	6 ft 7 in (2.01 m)	215 lb (98 kg)	1956–04–30	Syracuse
PG	15	Brad Davis	6 ft 3 in (1.91 m)	180 lb (82 kg)	1955–12–17	Maryland
SF	11	Abdul Jeelani	6 ft 8 in (2.03 m)	210 lb (95 kg)	1954–02–10	UW–Parkside
PF	53	Clarence Kea	6 ft 6 in (1.98 m)	218 lb (99 kg)	1959–02–02	Lamar
SG	21	Chad Kinch	6 ft 4 in (1.93 m)	190 lb (86 kg)	1958–05–22	Charlotte
C	25	Tom LaGarde	6 ft 10 in (2.08 m)	220 lb (100 kg)	1955–02–10	North Carolina
C	44	Scott Lloyd	6 ft 10 in (2.08 m)	230 lb (104 kg)	1952–12–19	Arizona State
SG	17	Ollie Mack	6 ft 3 in (1.91 m)	185 lb (84 kg)	1957–06–06	East Carolina
SG	43	Stan Pietkiewicz	6 ft 5 in (1.96 m)	200 lb (91 kg)	1956–07–14	Auburn
PF	52	Bill Robinzine	6 ft 7 in (2.01 m)	230 lb (104 kg)	1953–01–20	DePaul
SF	34	Jim Spanarkel	6 ft 5 in (1.96 m)	190 lb (86 kg)	1957–06–28	Duke

Coaches
Head coach
- Dick Motta
Assistant(s)
- Bob Weiss

Legend
- (DP) Unsigned draft pick
- (FA) Free agent
- (S) Suspended
- Injured

Roster
Updated: March 2, 1981

== Regular season ==
=== Season standings ===
Midwest Division	W	L	PCT	GB	Home	Road	Div
y-San Antonio Spurs	52	30	.634	–	34–7	18–23	21–9
x-Kansas City Kings	40	42	.488	12.0	24–17	16–25	19–11
x-Houston Rockets	40	42	.488	12.0	25–16	15–26	19–11
Denver Nuggets	37	45	.451	15.0	23–18	14–27	13–17
Utah Jazz	28	54	.341	24.0	20–21	8–33	13–17
Dallas Mavericks	15	67	.183	37.0	11–30	4–37	5–25

#	Western Conference				
#	Team	W	L	PCT	GB
1	c-Phoenix Suns	57	25	.695	–
2	y-San Antonio Spurs	52	30	.634	5
3	x-Los Angeles Lakers	54	28	.659	3
4	x-Portland Trail Blazers	45	37	.549	12
5	x-Kansas City Kings	40	42	.488	17
6	x-Houston Rockets	40	42	.488	17
7	Golden State Warriors	39	43	.476	18
8	Denver Nuggets	37	45	.451	20
9	San Diego Clippers	36	46	.439	21
10	Seattle SuperSonics	34	48	.415	23
11	Utah Jazz	28	54	.341	29
12	Dallas Mavericks	15	67	.183	42

Notes

- z, y – division champions
- x – clinched playoff spot

== Game log ==
=== Regular season ===
1980–81 game log
Total: 15–67 (Home: 11–30; Road: 4–37)
October: 2–10 (home: 1–3; road: 1–7)

Game	Date	Team	Score	High points	High rebounds	High assists	Location Attendance	Record
1	October 11	San Antonio Spurs	W 103–92	Winford Boynes (21)	Tom LaGarde (10)	Huston, LaGarde (5)	Reunion Arena; 10,373	1–0
2	October 14	Seattle	L 83–85	Geoff Huston (19)	Tom LaGarde (11)	Geoff Huston (7)	Reunion Arena; 7,004	1–1
3	October 15; 8:35 p.m. CDT	@ Denver	L 98–133	Jim Spanarkel (15)	Jerome Whitehead (10)	Geoff Huston (6)	McNichols Sports Arena; 6,658	1–2
4	October 17	Kansas City	L 91–103	Geoff Huston (28)	Tom LaGarde (8)	Tom LaGarde (6)	Reunion Arena; 7,017	1–3
5	October 18	@ San Antonio	L 96–110	Tom LaGarde (16)	Tom LaGarde (9)	Three players (4)	HemisFair Arena; 9,542	1–4
6	October 21	@ Phoenix	L 99–111	Jim Spanarkel (20)	Richard Washington (11)	Geoff Huston (6)	Arizona Veterans Memorial Coliseum; 10,507	1–5
7	October 22	@ Seattle	W 107–102	Richard Washington (24)	Richard Washington (9)	Tom LaGarde (9)	Seattle Kingdome; 14,125	2–5
8	October 24	@ Portland	L 105–120	Winford Boynes (18)	Jeelani, LaGarde (7)	Tom LaGarde (6)	Memorial Coliseum; 12,666	2–6
9	October 25	@ Golden State	L 79–86	Jim Spanarkel (16)	Tom LaGarde (11)	Geoff Huston (7)	Oakland-Alameda County Coliseum Arena; 6,750	2–7
10	October 28	Utah	L 96–104	Geoff Huston (26)	Richard Washington (16)	Geoff Huston (5)	Reunion Arena; 5,720	2–8
11	October 29	@ Houston	L 103–109	Jim Spanarkel (19)	Five players (4)	Geoff Huston (6)	The Summit; 6,123	2–9
12	October 31	@ Utah	L 122–144	Geoff Huston (24)	Tom LaGarde (9)	Darrell Allums (4)	Salt Palace; 5,703	2–10

November: 1–12 (home: 1–7; road: 0–5)

Game	Date	Team	Score	High points	High rebounds	High assists	Location Attendance	Record
13	November 4	San Diego	L 102–116	Tom LaGarde (23)	Tom LaGarde (12)	Huston (5)	Reunion Arena; 5,431	2–11
14	November 6	@ Washington	L 95–116	Terry Duerod (22)	Tom LaGarde (9)	Geoff Huston (8)	Capital Centre; 6,295	2–12
15	November 7; 7:30 p.m. CST	Los Angeles	L 102–126	Duerod, Huston (16)	Byrnes, Lloyd (8)	Tom LaGarde (7)	Reunion Arena; 17,481	2–13
16	November 8	@ Detroit	L 73–101	Huston, Robinzine (14)	Tom LaGarde (10)	LaGarde, Spanarkel (2)	Pontiac Silverdome; 4,584	2–14
17	November 11	Houston	L 94–105	Bill Robinzine (18)	Tom LaGarde (13)	Terry Duerod (6)	Reunion Arena; 5,472	2–15
18	November 14	Portland	W 113–106	Four players (19)	Tom LaGarde (14)	Geoff Huston (9)	Reunion Arena; 6,103	3–15
19	November 16; 9:00 p.m. CST	@ Los Angeles	L 102–110	Huston; Spanarkel (28)	Lloyd, Spanarkel (8)	Scott Lloyd (10)	The Forum; 10,893	3–16
20	November 18	Phoenix	L 91–102	Geoff Huston (19)	Scott Lloyd (13)	Geoff Huston (6)	Reunion Arena; 6,015	3–17
21	November 21	Seattle	L 91–101	Geoff Huston (20)	LaGarde, Robinzine (9)	Tom LaGarde (6)	Reunion Arena; 6,514	3–18
22	November 23	@ Portland	L 96–116	Geoff Huston (23)	Tom LaGarde (9)	Huston, Jeelani (5)	Memorial Coliseum; 12,666	3–19
23	November 25	Philadelphia	L 92–108	Jim Spanarkel (20)	Bill Robinzine (10)	Jim Spanarkel (5)	Reunion Arena; 13,527	3–20
24	November 28; 7:30 p.m. CST	Denver	L 117–119 (OT)	Tom LaGarde (22)	Scott Lloyd (16)	Geoff Huston (9)	Reunion Arena; 7,713	3–21
25	November 29	@ Houston	L 90–115	Abdul Jeelani (24)	Scott Lloyd (9)	Jeelani, LaGarde (5)	The Summit; 8,123	3–22

December: 2–14 (home: 2–5; road: 0–9)

Game	Date	Team	Score	High points	High rebounds	High assists	Location Attendance	Record
26	December 2	Cleveland	L 102–109	Robinzine, Spanarkel (18)	Tom LaGarde (13)	Geoff Huston (7)	Reunion Arena; 5,117	3–23
27	December 5; 6:30 p.m. CST	@ Boston	L 87–97	Bill Robinzine (24)	Tom LaGarde (12)	Geoff Huston (7)	Boston Garden; 14,351	3–24
28	December 6	@ Atlanta	L 104–110	Tom LaGarde (26)	Tom LaGarde (8)	LaGarde, Spanarkel (4)	Omni Coliseum; 7,347	3–25
29	December 9; 7:30 p.m. CST	Los Angeles	L 92–103	Geoff Huston (19)	Tom LaGarde (12)	Huston, Spanarkel (5)	Reunion Arena; 9,313	3–26
30	December 10; 8:35 p.m. CST	@ Denver	L 107–116	Geoff Huston (27)	LaGarde, Robinzine (11)	Brad Davis (9)	McNichols Sports Arena; 7,768	3–27
31	December 12	San Diego	W 112–109 (OT)	Jim Spanarkel (22)	Tom LaGarde (10)	Brad Davis (6)	Reunion Arena; 6,457	4–27
32	December 13	@ Kansas City	L 107–114	Tom LaGarde (22)	Tom LaGarde (9)	Huston, Spanarkel (5)	Kemper Arena; 5,578	4–28
33	December 16	San Antonio	L 83–89	Geoff Huston (17)	Bill Robinzine (12)	Geoff Huston (8)	Reunion Arena; 6,140	4–29
34	December 17	@ Phoenix	L 102–115	Jim Spanarkel (25)	Jim Spanarkel (8)	Jim Spanarkel (7)	Arizona Veterans Memorial Coliseum; 10,247	4–30
35	December 18	@ San Diego	L 92–102	Bill Robinzine (23)	Bill Robinzine (13)	Davis, Huston (5)	San Diego Sports Arena; 7,167	4–31
36	December 20	Golden State	L 98–101	Geoff Huston (20)	LaGarde, Robinzine (10)	Davis (7)	Reunion Arena; 5,848	4–32
37	December 23	Utah	L 96–101	Bill Robinzine (23)	Scott Lloyd (11)	Brad Davis (10)	Reunion Arena; 5,736	4–33
38	December 26; 7:30 p.m. CST	Denver	W 119–111	Abdul Jeelani (20)	Scott Lloyd (16)	Brad Davis (7)	Reunion Arena; 8,293	5–33
39	December 27	@ Milwaukee	L 96–112	Bill Robinzine (16)	LaGarde, Robinzine (6)	Brad Davis (8)	MECCA Arena; 11,052	5–34
40	December 29	@ Cleveland	L 100–112	Bill Robinzine (23)	Bill Robinzine (14)	Geoff Huston (6)	Coliseum at Richfield; 3,884	5–35
41	December 30	@ New York	L 98–100	Jim Spanarkel (26)	Tom LaGarde (17)	Brad Davis (6)	Madison Square Garden; 10,559	5–36

January: 3–9 (home: 2–4; road: 1–5)

Game	Date	Team	Score	High points	High rebounds	High assists	Location Attendance	Record
42	January 2	Houston	L 120–124 (OT)	Geoff Huston] (29)	Tom LaGarde (9)	Geoff Huston (11)	Reunion Arena; 7,872	5–37
43	January 5	@ Seattle	L 89–103	Geoff Huston (21)	Bill Robinzine (10)	Geoff Huston (6)	Seattle Kingdome; 12,210	5–38
44	January 7	@ Golden State	W 111–109	Geoff Huston (24)	Bill Robinzine (14)	Geoff Huston (8)	Oakland-Alameda County Coliseum Arena; 7,246	6–38
45	January 8	@ Utah	L 97–99	Tom LaGarde (24)	Bill Robinzine (12)	Brad Davis (6)	Salt Palace; 7,239	6–39
46	January 10	Washington	L 94–106	Huston, Spanarkel (20)	Bill Robinzine (18)	Geoff Huston (5)	Reunion Arena; 8,021	6–40
47	January 13	Chicago	W 112–106	Bill Robinzine (26)	Bill Robinzine (8)	Brad Davis (9)	Reunion Arena; 5,771	7–40
48	January 16	New York	W 118–110	Geoff Huston (24)	Bill Robinzine (12)	Geoff Huston (7)	Reunion Arena; 10,473	8–40
49	January 18	@ San Diego	L 109–115	Tom LaGarde (18)	Scott Lloyd (11)	Geoff Huston (8)	San Diego Sports Arena; 3,980	8–41
50	January 20	Kansas City	L 91–104	Bill Robinzine (25)	Tom LaGarde (16)	Brad Davis (7)	Reunion Arena; 5,899	8–42
51	January 23	@ Chicago	L 98–106	Oliver Mack (22)	Tom LaGarde (12)	Geoff Huston (6)	Chicago Stadium; 7,836	8–43
52	January 24	@ Indiana	L 89–107	Tom LaGarde (15)	Three players (6)	Bill Robinzine (6)	Market Square Arena; 12,636	8–44
53	January 27	New Jersey	L 100–112	Tom LaGarde (22)	Bill Robinzine (10)	Oliver Mack (7)	Reunion Arena; 5,727	8–45

February: 1–13 (home: 0–7; road: 1–6)

Game	Date	Team	Score	High points	High rebounds	High assists	Location Attendance	Record
54	February 3	Kansas City	L 100–121	Geoff Huston (23)	Tom LaGarde (13)	Oliver Mack (5)	Reunion Arena; 5,335	8–46
55	February 4	@ Houston	L 68–116	Bill Robinzine (14)	LaGarde, Robinzine (6)	Three players (5)	The Summit; 8,353	8–47
56	February 6	Atlanta	L 98–100	Bill Robinzine (16)	Scott Lloyd (8)	Brad Davis (6)	Reunion Arena; 6,882	8–48
57	February 8	@ San Antonio	L 98–102	Three players (15)	Bill Robinzine (10)	Brad Davis (6)	HemisFair Arena; 8,918	8–49
58	February 10	Detroit	L 95–101	Jim Spanarkel (23)	Bill Robinzine (15)	Brad Davis (9)	Reunion Arena; 5,047	8–50
59	February 11	@ Phoenix	L 97–119	Tom LaGarde (20)	LaGarde, Lloyd (7)	Tom LaGarde (5)	Arizona Veterans Memorial Coliseum; 10,357	8–51
60	February 14	San Antonio	L 99–107	Jim Spanarkel (22)	Scott Lloyd (7)	Brad Davis (7)	Reunion Arena; 9,826	8–52
61	February 15; 4:00 p.m. CST	@ Los Angeles	L 99–107	Oliver Mack (19)	Clarence Kea (13)	Brad Davis (6)	The Forum; 11,920	8–53
62	February 17	Milwaukee	L 106–114	Brad Davis (24)	Oliver Mack (9)	Brad Davis (7)	Reunion Arena; 7,068	8–54
63	February 20	@ Philadelphia	L 109–117	Oliver Mack (19)	Bill Robinzine (8)	Jim Spanarkel (4)	The Spectrum; 10,642	8–55
64	February 22	@ New Jersey	W 132–109	Oliver Mack (28)	Scott Lloyd (11)	Brad Davis (7)	Rutgers Athletic Center; 7,849	9–55
65	February 24	Seattle	L 84–102	Jim Spanarkel (15)	Tom LaGarde (14)	Brad Davis (7)	Reunion Arena; 6,525	9–56
66	February 26	@ Kansas City	L 102–105	Clarence Kea (19)	Tom LaGarde (12)	Brad Davis (16)	Kemper Arena; 8,701	9–57
67	February 27	Indiana	L 111–118	Oliver Mack (26)	Clarence Kea (10)	Brad Davis (8)	Reunion Arena; 7,359	9–58

March: 6–9 (home: 5–4; road: 1–5)

Game	Date	Team	Score	High points	High rebounds	High assists	Location Attendance	Record
68	March 1	San Diego	W 99–91	Oliver Mack (24)	Lloyd, Mack (8)	Brad Davis (12)	Reunion Arena; 4,858	10–58
69	March 3; 7:30 p.m. CST	Boston	L 105–117	Brad Davis (31)	Tom LaGarde (8)	Brad Davis (13)	Reunion Arena; 15,593	10–59
70	March 6	@ Golden State	L 109–115	Tom LaGarde (22)	Bill Robinzine (9)	Brad Davis (9)	Oakland-Alameda County Coliseum Arena; 8,694	10–60
71	March 8	@ San Antonio	L 108–133	Clarence Kea (22)	Clarence Kea (10)	Brad Davis (6)	HemisFair Arena; 8,251	10–61
72	March 10	Phoenix	W 107–103	Jim Spanarkel (25)	Tom LaGarde (14)	Brad Davis (9)	Reunion Arena; 6,469	11–61
73	March 12	Golden State	W 120–118	Jim Spanarkel (26)	Bill Robinzine (11)	Brad Davis (14)	Reunion Arena; 5,380	12–61
74	March 15	@ Portland	L 110–135	Abdul Jeelani (31)	Abdul Jeelani (6)	Brad Davis (9)	Memorial Coliseum; 12,666	12–62
75	March 17; 7:30 p.m. CST	Los Angeles	L 109–114	Bill Robinzine (26)	Tom LaGarde(15)	Brad Davis (16)	Reunion Arena; 17,828	12–63
76	March 18	@ Utah	L 113–120	Davis, Byrnes (25)	Scott Lloyd (8)	Brad Davis (10)	Salt Palace; 5,248	12–64
77	March 20; 7:30 p.m. CST	Denver	W 126–125	Byrnes, Robinzine (22)	Bill Robinzine (15)	Brad Davis (10)	Reunion Arena; 6,359	13–64
78	March 21	Utah	W 105–95	Davis, Robinzine (20)	Bill Robinzine (13)	Brad Davis (12)	Reunion Arena; 7,416	14–64
79	March 24	Houston	L 111–114 OT	Davis, LaGarde (19)	Tom LaGarde (11)	Brad Davis (14)	Reunion Arena; 7,162	14–65
80	March 25; 8:35 p.m. CST	@ Denver	W 126–115	Brad Davis (25)	Abdul Jeelani (11)	Brad Davis (10)	McNichols Sports Arena; 14,035	15–65
81	March 27	Portland	L 109–123	Scott Lloyd (28)	Tom LaGarde (9)	Brad Davis (11)	Reunion Arena; 11,203	15–66
82	March 29	@ Kansas City	L 104–113	Marty Byrnes (24)	Bill Robinzine (6)	Brad Davis (8)	Kemper Arena; 7,171	15–67

1980–81 schedule

== Player statistics ==
=== Regular season ===
Player	POS	GP	GS	MP	REB	AST	STL	BLK	PTS	MPG	RPG	APG	SPG	BPG	PPG
Tom LaGarde	PF	82	82	2,670	665	237	35	45	1,122	32.6	8.1	2.9	.4	.5	13.7
Jim Spanarkel	SF	82		2,317	297	232	117	20	1,184	28.3	3.6	2.8	1.4	.2	14.4
Scott Lloyd	C	72		2,186	454	159	34	25	637	30.4	6.3	2.2	.5	.3	8.8
Marty Byrnes	SF	72		1,360	177	113	29	17	561	18.9	2.5	1.6	.4	.2	7.8
Bill Robinzine^{†}	PF	70		1,932	520	113	71	9	970	27.6	7.4	1.6	1.0	.1	13.9
Abdul Jeelani	SF	66		1,108	230	65	44	31	553	16.8	3.5	1.0	.7	.5	8.4
Oliver Mack^{†}	SG	62		1,666	229	162	55	7	635	26.9	3.7	2.6	.9	.1	10.2
Geoff Huston^{†}	PG	56		1,892	99	277	45	6	899	33.8	1.8	4.9	.8	.1	16.1
Brad Davis	PG	56		1,686	151	385	52	11	626	30.1	2.7	6.9	.9	.2	11.2
Winford Boynes	SG	44		757	75	37	23	16	287	17.2	1.7	.8	.5	.4	6.5
Stan Pietkiewicz^{†}	SG	36		431	41	75	15	2	140	12.0	1.1	2.1	.4	.1	3.9
Darrell Allums	PF	22		276	65	25	5	8	59	12.5	3.0	1.1	.2	.4	2.7
Terry Duerod^{†}	SF	18		337	39	30	12	4	168	18.7	2.2	1.7	.7	.2	9.3
Joe Hassett^{†}	SG	17		280	25	18	5	0	138	16.5	1.5	1.1	.3	.0	8.1
Clarence Kea	PF	16		199	67	5	6	1	117	12.4	4.2	.3	.4	.1	7.3
Chad Kinch^{†}	SG	12		106	9	10	2	1	38	8.8	.8	.8	.2	.1	3.2
Richard Washington^{†}	PF	11		307	84	16	5	7	119	27.9	7.6	1.5	.5	.6	10.8
Austin Carr^{†}	SG	8		77	9	9	1	0	16	9.6	1.1	1.1	.1	.0	2.0
Jerome Whitehead^{†}	C	7		118	28	2	4	1	37	16.9	4.0	.3	.6	.1	5.3
Ralph Drollinger	C	6		67	19	14	1	2	15	11.2	3.2	2.3	.2	.3	2.5
Monti Davis^{†}	PF	1		8	3	0	0	1	1	8.0	3.0	.0	.0	1.0	1.0

- ^{†} Denotes player spent time with another team in the season. Stats reflect time with the Mavericks only.

== Transactions ==
=== Trades ===
June 9, 1980
To Dallas Mavericks----
- 1981 second-round draft pick
- Future considerations
To Phoenix Suns----
- Wiley Peck
September 11, 1980
To Dallas Mavericks----
- 1983 second-round draft pick
- 1984 second-round draft pick
To Utah Jazz----
- Billy McKinney
September 16, 1980
To Dallas Mavericks----
- 1984 first-round draft pick
To Cleveland Cavaliers----
- Mike Bratz
October 30, 1980
To Dallas Mavericks----
- Bill Robinzine
- 1983 first-round draft pick
- 1986 first-round draft pick
To Cleveland Cavaliers----
- Richard Washington
- Jerome Whitehead
February 7, 1981
To Dallas Mavericks----
- Chad Kinch
- 1985 first-round draft pick
To Cleveland Cavaliers----
- Geoff Huston

=== Free agents ===
==== Additions ====
Player	Signed	Former team
Ralph Drollinger	June 9, 1980	
Scott Lloyd	October 28, 1980	Milwaukee Bucks
Ollie Mack	November 17, 1980	Chicago Bulls
Brad Davis	December 2, 1980	

==== Subtractions ====
Player	Left	New team
Dave Britton	September 12, 1980	Washington Bullets
Raymond Townsend	October 3, 1980	
Austin Carr	November 6, 1980	Washington Bullets
Joe Hassett	November 17, 1980	Golden State Warriors
Darrell Allums	December 1, 1980	
Terry Duerod	December 2, 1980	Boston Celtics
Monti Davis	January 12, 1981	
Winford Boynes	February 19, 1981	
Ralph Drollinger	March 2, 1981	

== See also ==
- 1980–81 NBA season
