= Jerome Whitehead =

American basketball player

Personal information
- Born: September 30, 1956 Waukegan, Illinois, U.S.
- Died: December 20, 2012 (aged 56) El Cajon, California, U.S.
- Listed height: 6 ft 10 in (2.08 m)
- Listed weight: 220 lb (100 kg)

Career information
- High school: Waukegan (Waukegan, Illinois)
- College: Riverside CC (1974–1975); Marquette (1975–1978)
- NBA draft: 1978: 2nd round, 41st overall pick
- Drafted by: Buffalo Braves
- Playing career: 1978–1989
- Position: Center / power forward
- Number: 33, 40, 54, 52, 6

Career history
- 1978–1979: San Diego Clippers
- 1979–1980: Utah Jazz
- 1980: Dallas Mavericks
- 1980: Cleveland Cavaliers
- 1981–1984: San Diego Clippers
- 1984–1988: Golden State Warriors
- 1988–1989: San Antonio Spurs

Career highlights
- NCAA champion (1977); Third-team All-American – NABC (1978)

Career NBA statistics
- Points: 4,423 (6.5 ppg)
- Rebounds: 3,268 (4.8 rpg)
- Assists: 374 (0.6 apg)
- Stats at NBA.com
- Stats at Basketball Reference

Jerome Whitehead (September 30, 1956 – December 20, 2012) was an American professional basketball player. He was selected by the San Diego Clippers in the second round (41st overall) of the 1978 NBA draft. A 6'10" center-forward from Marquette University, Whitehead played in 11 National Basketball Association (NBA) seasons from 1978 to 1989. He played for the Clippers, Utah Jazz, Dallas Mavericks, Cleveland Cavaliers, Golden State Warriors and San Antonio Spurs.

In his NBA career, Whitehead played in 679 games and scored a total of 4,423 points.

In his junior season at Marquette University, Whitehead helped lead his Warriors to the 1977 national championship. In the semi-final game of the Final Four that season, Whitehead made a game-winning basket at the buzzer in the 1977 national semifinal victory over UNC-Charlotte on a length-of-the-court pass from Butch Lee. Previous to that, UNC-Charlotte's Cedric Maxwell had tied the game with only 3 seconds remaining. The game appeared to be headed for overtime when Whitehead's bucket won the game for the Warriors.

On December 20, 2012, Whitehead was found dead; an autopsy performed on December 21 found Whitehead died as a result of gastrointestinal hemorrhaging.

== Career statistics ==
Legend
GP	Games played	GS	Games started	MPG	Minutes per game
FG%	Field goal percentage	3P%	3-point field goal percentage	FT%	Free throw percentage
RPG	Rebounds per game	APG	Assists per game	SPG	Steals per game
BPG	Blocks per game	PPG	Points per game	**Bold**	Career high

=== NBA ===
==== Regular season ====
Year	Team	GP	GS	MPG	FG%	3P%	FT%	RPG	APG	SPG	BPG	PPG
1978–79	San Diego	31		4.9	.441		.444	1.6	.2	.1	.1	1.2
1979–80	San Diego	18		12.5	**.600**	–	.278	3.9	.3	.1	.3	3.3
1979–80	Utah	32		10.3	.449	–	.294	3.0	.6	.2	.3	2.1
1980–81	Dallas	7		16.9	.421	–	.455	4.0	.3	.6	.1	5.3
1980–81	Cleveland	3		2.7	.333	–	–	1.0	.0	.3	.0	.7
1980–81	San Diego	38		14.8	.475	.000	.511	4.8	.6	.4	.2	4.1
1981–82	San Diego	72	60	30.8	.559	–	.763	**9.2**	**1.4**	**.7**	**.6**	**13.8**
1982–83	San Diego	46	23	19.7	.536	–	**.828**	5.7	.9	.5	.3	8.7
1983–84	San Diego	70	1	13.2	.490	–	.822	3.5	.3	.2	.2	5.4
1984–85	Golden State	79	**78**	**32.1**	.510	–	.783	7.9	.7	.6	.5	13.0
1985–86	Golden State	**81**	3	13.3	.429	–	.619	4.0	.2	.2	.2	3.9
1986–87	Golden State	73	1	12.8	.450	.000	.699	3.6	.3	.2	.2	5.1
1987–88	Golden State	72	27	17.0	.483	–	.720	4.5	.5	.4	.3	5.7
1988–89	Golden State	5	0	8.4	.500	–	.500	1.0	.4	.2	.0	2.4
1988–89	San Antonio	52	4	11.2	.392	–	.667	2.5	.3	.4	.1	3.2
Career		679	200	17.4	.497	.000	.718	4.8	.6	.4	.3	6.5

==== Playoffs ====
Year	Team	GP	GS	MPG	FG%	3P%	FT%	RPG	APG	SPG	BPG	PPG
1987	Golden State	10	0	10.0	.333	–	.400	1.4	.3	.2	.2	2.2
