= Darrell Allums =

American basketball player (born 1958)

Personal information
- Born: September 12, 1958 (age 68) Los Angeles, California, U.S.
- Listed height: 6 ft 9 in (2.06 m)
- Listed weight: 220 lb (100 kg)

Career information
- High school: Lynwood (Lynwood, California)
- College: UCLA (1976–1980)
- NBA draft: 1980: 5th round, 103rd overall pick
- Drafted by: Dallas Mavericks
- Playing career: 1980–1981
- Position: Power forward
- Number: 32

Career history
- 1980–1981: Dallas Mavericks
- 1981: U/Tex Wranglers
- Stats at NBA.com
- Stats at Basketball Reference

Darrell Wilbert Allums Jr. (born September 12, 1958) is an American retired basketball player. He played in the National Basketball Association (NBA) during the 1980–81 season with the Dallas Mavericks.

== Basketball ==
Allums attended Lynwood High School, where his 18 points and 18 rebounds per game helped lead his team to the Southern Section 3A championship.

A 6'9" forward playing on scholarship for the UCLA Bruins men's basketball team, Allums played for three different coaches and ended his collegiate career by playing four minutes in UCLA's loss to the University of Louisville in the finals of the 1980 NCAA Men's Division I Basketball Tournament.

Allums was selected with the 11th pick in the fifth round of the 1980 NBA draft by the Dallas Mavericks and played one season (1980–81) for them, averaging 2.7 points, 3.0 rebounds and 1.1 assist per game.

== Later life ==
In 1989, Allums was sentenced to nine years in prison for robbing Domino's Pizza deliverymen on 14 separate occasions (he was convicted of eight counts with the other six charges dropped). During the trial the judge was sympathetic after it was brought out that Allums was fighting a cocaine habit.

== Career statistics ==
Legend
GP	Games played	GS	Games started	MPG	Minutes per game
FG%	Field goal percentage	3P%	3-point field goal percentage	FT%	Free throw percentage
RPG	Rebounds per game	APG	Assists per game	SPG	Steals per game
BPG	Blocks per game	PPG	Points per game	**Bold**	Career high

=== NBA ===
==== Regular season ====
Year	Team	GP	MPG	FG%	3P%	FT%	RPG	APG	SPG	BPG	PPG
1980–81	Dallas	22	12.5	.343	.000	.591	3.0	1.1	.2	.4	2.7
