= Monti Davis =

American basketball player (1958–2013)

Personal information
- Born: July 26, 1958 Warren, Ohio, U.S.
- Died: June 4, 2013 (aged 54) Warren, Ohio, U.S.
- Listed height: 6 ft 7 in (2.01 m)
- Listed weight: 205 lb (93 kg)

Career information
- High school: Warren G. Harding (Warren, Ohio)
- College: Tennessee State (1976–1980)
- NBA draft: 1980: 1st round, 21st overall pick
- Drafted by: Philadelphia 76ers
- Playing career: 1980–1981
- Position: Power forward
- Number: 44, 43

Career history
- 1980: Philadelphia 76ers
- 1981: Dallas Mavericks

Career highlights
- NCAA rebounding leader (1979)
- Stats at NBA.com
- Stats at Basketball Reference

DaMon William "Monti" Davis (born July 26, 1958 – June 4, 2013) was an American professional basketball player. He was a 6-foot-7-inch (201 cm) 205 pounds (93 kg) forward and played collegiately at Tennessee State University.

Davis was selected with the 21st pick of the first round of the 1980 NBA draft by the Philadelphia 76ers. In his only NBA season (1980–81), he played one game each for the Sixers and the Dallas Mavericks, tallying a total of three points and four rebounds.

== Career statistics ==
Legend
GP	Games played	GS	Games started	MPG	Minutes per game
FG%	Field goal percentage	3P%	3-point field goal percentage	FT%	Free throw percentage
RPG	Rebounds per game	APG	Assists per game	SPG	Steals per game
BPG	Blocks per game	PPG	Points per game	**Bold**	Career high

=== NBA ===
==== Regular season ====
Year	Team	GP	GS	MPG	FG%	3P%	FT%	RPG	APG	SPG	BPG	PPG
1980–81	Philadelphia	**1**	0	2.0	**1.000**	–	–	1.0	.0	.0	.0	**2.0**
1980–81	Dallas	**1**		**8.0**	.000	–	**.200**	**3.0**	.0	.0	**1.0**	1.0
Career		2	0	5.0	.200	–	.200	2.0	.0	.0	.5	1.5

== See also ==
- List of NCAA Division I men's basketball players with 30 or more rebounds in a game
- List of NCAA Division I men's basketball season rebounding leaders
