= Scott Lloyd =

American basketball player

Personal information
- Born: December 19, 1952 (age 73) Chicago, Illinois, U.S.
- Listed height: 6 ft 10 in (2.08 m)
- Listed weight: 230 lb (104 kg)

Career information
- High school: East (Phoenix, Arizona)
- College: Arizona State (1973–1976)
- NBA draft: 1976: 2nd round, 24th overall pick
- Drafted by: Milwaukee Bucks
- Playing career: 1976–1982
- Position: Center / power forward
- Number: 45, 44

Career history
- 1976–1977: Milwaukee Bucks
- 1977–1978: Buffalo Braves / San Diego Clippers
- 1978–1979: Chicago Bulls
- 1979-1980: Reyer Venezia
- 1980–1982: Dallas Mavericks

Career highlights
- First-team All-WAC (1976)

Career NBA statistics
- Points: 1,694 (4.6 ppg)
- Rebounds: 1,114 (3.0 rpg)
- Assists: 356 (1.0 apg)
- Stats at NBA.com
- Stats at Basketball Reference

Scott G. Lloyd (born December 19, 1952) is an American former professional basketball player. He was a 6'10" 230 lb center who played high school basketball at East Phoenix High School where he was selected All-America and led his team to the 1971 state title. After receiving hundreds of college scholarship offers, Lloyd elected to play at the local Arizona State University.

In 1975, together with Lionel Hollins, Lloyd led the Sun Devils to the Western Athletic Conference title and he earned honorable mention All-American honors. During four years at ASU, Lloyd averaged 13.1 points and 6.7 rebounds per game, and was named team MVP after the 1975–76 season.

== Professional career ==
Lloyd was selected in the second round in the 1976 NBA draft (24th pick overall) by the Milwaukee Bucks. The next summer he was named MVP of the Summer Pro League after averaging 23.4 points and 8.2 rebounds.

Lloyd played the next season for the Buffalo Braves, who became the San Diego Clippers after the 1977–78 season. After being traded to the Chicago Bulls as a back-up for Artis Gilmore, Lloyd then played one season of pro ball in Venice, Italy.

Lloyd's big break came in 1980 when he was signed by the expansion Dallas Mavericks. He played three seasons with the Mavs, starting 87 consecutive games at center. He scored a career-high 28 points against the Portland Trail Blazers. As a center, Lloyd had a surprisingly strong outside shot, and in the 1981–82 season he led the Mavericks with a three-point field goal percentage of .500.

Throughout his career, Lloyd became endeared to local fans for his work ethic, modesty, outgoing personality and devotion to charity causes.

Lloyd was the subject of a spirited Scott Lloyd Fan Club that operated from 1977 to 1983. The club became famous for hanging 50-foot banners from the balconies of arenas around the NBA, with slogans like "Great Scott - It's Lloyd!," "This is the Year of Our Lloyd," "Llong Llive Lloyd," and "May the Lloyd be with you." The fan club was featured in Sports Illustrated magazine (March 26, 1983) .

== NBA career statistics ==
Legend
GP	Games played	GS	Games started	MPG	Minutes per game
FG%	Field goal percentage	3P%	3-point field goal percentage	FT%	Free throw percentage
RPG	Rebounds per game	APG	Assists per game	SPG	Steals per game
BPG	Blocks per game	PPG	Points per game	**Bold**	Career high

=== Regular season ===
Year	Team	GP	GS	MPG	FG%	3P%	FT%	RPG	APG	SPG	BPG	PPG
1976–77	Milwaukee	69	-	14.9	**.472**	-	.754	3.0	0.5	0.3	0.2	5.8
1977–78	Milwaukee	14	-	8.0	.364	-	.600	1.9	0.6	0.2	**0.4**	2.1
1977–78	Buffalo	56	-	10.1	.425	-	.741	2.1	0.6	0.2	0.2	3.2
1978–79	San Diego	5	-	6.2	.000	-	.000	0.6	0.0	0.2	0.0	0.0
1978–79	Chicago	67	-	6.9	.350	-	.574	1.4	0.5	0.1	0.1	1.7
1980–81	Dallas	72	-	**30.4**	.448	.000	.717	**6.3**	**2.2**	**0.5**	0.3	**8.8**
1981–82	Dallas	**74**	**17**	14.1	.379	**.500**	**.758**	2.2	0.9	0.2	0.1	3.9
1982–83	Dallas	15	0	13.7	.380	.000	.647	3.1	1.4	0.4	**0.4**	3.3
Career		372	17	15.2	.425	.286	.718	3.0	1.0	0.3	0.2	4.6

== Business career ==
Lloyd retired after the 1982–83 season, and now owns Hamhula Tee Shirt Co., a custom silk screening T-shirt printing business in Dallas, Texas.

Lloyd's T-shirt business also graciously makes shirts for National Adoption Day in Dallas, Texas.

== Personal ==
In 2004, Lloyd suffered a ruptured aorta. Doctors at Presbyterian Hospital in Dallas performed emergency surgery to replace the torn aorta with a titanium and polyester valve.
