= Butch Lee =

Puerto Rican basketball player (born 1956)

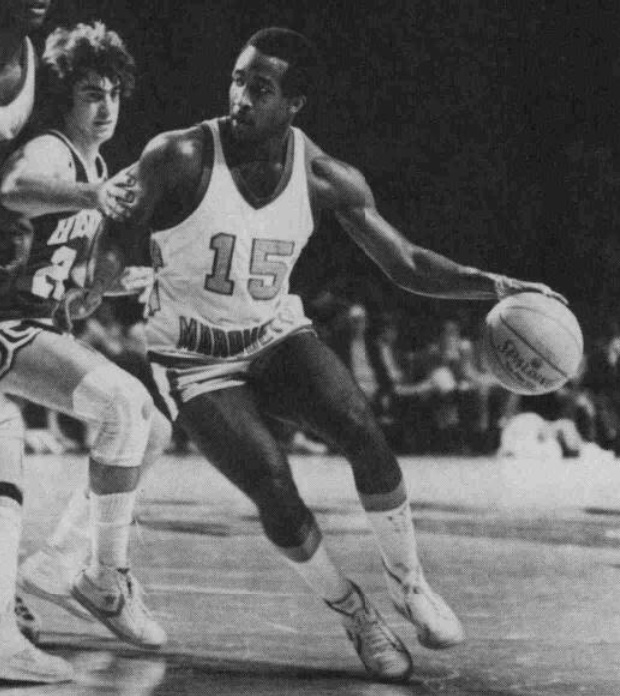
- Lee as a senior at Marquette

Personal information
- Born: December 5, 1956 (age 69) Santurce, Puerto Rico
- Listed height: 6 ft 0 in (1.83 m)
- Listed weight: 185 lb (84 kg)

Career information
- High school: DeWitt Clinton (The Bronx, New York)
- College: Marquette (1974–1978)
- NBA draft: 1978: 1st round, 10th overall pick
- Drafted by: Atlanta Hawks
- Playing career: 1975–1990
- Position: Point guard
- Number: 15

Career history

Playing
- 1975–1977: Cardenales de Río Piedras
- 1978–1979: Atlanta Hawks
- 1979–1980: Cleveland Cavaliers
- 1980: Los Angeles Lakers
- 1984: Cardenales de Río Piedras
- 1985: Brujos de Guayama
- 1985: Atléticos de San Germán
- 1986–1989: Leones de Ponce
- 1990: Polluelos de Aibonito

Career highlights
- NBA champion (1980); BSN champion (1985); NCAA champion (1977); NCAA final Four Most Outstanding Player (1977); Naismith College Player of the Year (1978); AP Player of the Year (1978); Adolph Rupp Trophy (1978); UPI Player of the Year (1978); Consensus first-team All-American (1978); Consensus second-team All-American (1977); No. 15 retired by Marquette Golden Eagles

Career NBA statistics
- Points: 773 (8.1 ppg)
- Rebounds: 137 (1.4 rpg)
- Assists: 307 (3.2 apg)
- Stats at NBA.com
- Stats at Basketball Reference

Alfred "Butch" Lee Jr. (born December 5, 1956) is a Puerto Rican former professional basketball player. Lee was the first Puerto Rican and first Latin American-born athlete to play in the National Basketball Association (NBA), accomplishing this after being selected in the first round of the 1978 NBA draft.

He began his career in the NCAA, where he gathered several "Player of the Year" recognitions and earned All-American honors as both a junior and senior while at Marquette University. Lee was selected as the Most Outstanding Player at the 1977 Final Four where he led the Warriors to the school's first national championship. The university recognized this by retiring his jersey.

In the NBA, he played for the Atlanta Hawks, Cleveland Cavaliers and the Los Angeles Lakers. Lee concluded his career in the Baloncesto Superior Nacional (BSN). He is known to be the only Puerto Rican professional basketball player to win championships in the NCAA, NBA, and BSN. Lee was also a member of the Puerto Rican national team.

== Playing career ==
=== Early life and college ===
Lee was born in Santurce, San Juan, Puerto Rico to Gloria and Alfred Lee Sr. Lee's family moved to Harlem, New York, U.S., when he was a young child. There he went on to become a 1st Team, PSAL All City basketball player and honor student at the DeWitt Clinton High School in the Bronx. Lee showed talent for basketball since an early age, and he impressed many college scouts with his game style. He accepted an offer to play for Marquette University, starring there from 1974 to 1978. In 1974 Lee asked his coach Al McGuire to allow him to play for the United States Olympic basketball team. However, his coach had sent someone else and Lee went to Puerto Rico where he qualified for the Puerto Rican national basketball team. When Puerto Rico played against the U.S. in the 1976 Summer Olympics, Lee made 15 out of 18 field goals and scored 35 points. The U.S. still avoided an upset, defeating Puerto Rico by one point, 95–94.

In 1977, Lee led Marquette to the Final Four in what McGuire had announced would be his final season. The Warriors defeated UNC-Charlotte 51–49 in the semifinal round when Lee found Jerome Whitehead with a length of the court pass for a score just before the buzzer. In the final against North Carolina, Lee scored 19 points and led the Warriors to a come-from-behind 67–59 victory to secure the national championship. Lee was named the tournament's most outstanding player.

=== NBA ===
Lee then went on to become the first Puerto Rican player to play in the National Basketball Association, when he was chosen in the first round of the 1978 NBA draft by the Atlanta Hawks.

During Lee's first season in the NBA (1978-79), he started with the Hawks averaging 7.7 points per game during 49 games. He was traded to the Cleveland Cavaliers, where he enjoyed what were perhaps his best games in the league, scoring 11.5 points per game in the remaining 33 games of the season. He ended up scoring an average of 9.6 points per game in his first season in the NBA. Lee led the league in games played with 82.

After three games with the Cavs in the 1979-1980 season, Lee suffered a knee injury that would require surgery, and proved to be too big of an obstacle for him to overcome as far as his basketball career was concerned. He only scored 1.3 points per game on those three games. Before the season was over, he would be traded once again, to the Los Angeles Lakers, where, he played alongside Magic Johnson and Kareem Abdul-Jabbar, among others, for eleven games, before his injury recurred, forcing him to retire. He did, however, win an NBA championship ring, as the Lakers went on to beat the Philadelphia 76ers in that season's NBA Finals.

== Coaching career ==
Lee, who is fluent in Spanish, returned to Puerto Rico after his experience as an NBA basketball player was over. There, he became a well known and respected head coach with multiple BSN teams.

In 1992, Lee led the Capitanes de Arecibo to the BSN Finals, where they lost to the Leones de Ponce in 6 games. He also coached Aguadilla, Ponce and the Gigantes de Carolina.

In January 2009, he was announced as the new coach of the Cangrejeros de Santurce. However, he was dismissed during the playoffs after Santurce lost two games in a row.

He continued to help out with teams and coached some of them at the Guaynabo Basketball Academy (GBA).

== Career playing statistics ==
Legend
| GP | Games played | GS | Games started | MPG | Minutes per game |
| FG% | Field goal percentage | 3P% | 3-point field goal percentage | FT% | Free throw percentage |
| RPG | Rebounds per game | APG | Assists per game | SPG | Steals per game |
| BPG | Blocks per game | PPG | Points per game | **Bold** | Career high |
| † | Won an NBA championship | * | Led the league |

=== NBA ===
==== Regular season ====
| Year | Team | GP | GS | MPG | FG% | 3P% | FT% | RPG | APG | SPG | BPG | PPG |
|---|---|---|---|---|---|---|---|---|---|---|---|---|
| 1978–79 | Atlanta | **49*** | 4 | 20.3 | **.460** | | .752 | 1.2 | 3.4 | **1.1** | .0 | 7.7 |
| 1978–79 | Cleveland | **33*** | | **23.7** | .455 | | .770 | **2.0** | **3.8** | .9 | .0 | **11.5** |
| 1979–80 | Cleveland | 3 | | 8.0 | .182 | – | .000 | 1.0 | 1.0 | .0 | .0 | 1.3 |
| 1979–80† | L.A. Lakers | 11 | | 2.8 | .308 | – | **.857** | .7 | .8 | .1 | .0 | 1.3 |
| Career | | 96 | 4 | 19.1 | .450 | – | .761 | 1.4 | 3.2 | .9 | .0 | 8.1 |

==== Playoffs ====
| Year | Team | GP | MPG | FG% | 3P% | FT% | RPG | APG | SPG | BPG | PPG |
|---|---|---|---|---|---|---|---|---|---|---|---|
| 1980† | L.A. Lakers | 3 | 2.0 | – | – | 1.000 | .3 | .0 | .0 | .0 | .7 |

== See also ==
- Race and ethnicity in the NBA
- List of Puerto Ricans
