= Geoff Huston (basketball) =

American basketball player (born 1957)

Personal information
- Born: November 8, 1957 (age 69) Brooklyn, New York, U.S.
- Listed height: 6 ft 2 in (1.88 m)
- Listed weight: 175 lb (79 kg)

Career information
- High school: Canarsie (Brooklyn, New York)
- College: Texas Tech (1975–1979)
- NBA draft: 1979: 3rd round, 50th overall pick
- Drafted by: New York Knicks
- Playing career: 1979–1990
- Position: Point guard
- Number: 23, 20, 15

Career history
- 1979–1980: New York Knicks
- 1980–1981: Dallas Mavericks
- 1981–1984: Cleveland Cavaliers
- 1985: Westchester Golden Apples
- 1985–1986: Golden State Warriors
- 1986: Los Angeles Clippers
- 1987: Long Island Knights
- 1990: New York Whitecaps

Career NBA statistics
- Points: 4,380 (8.8 ppg)
- Rebounds: 684 (1.4 rpg)
- Assists: 2,509 (5.1 apg)
- Stats at NBA.com
- Stats at Basketball Reference

Geoffrey Angier Huston (born November 8, 1957) is an American former professional basketball player. He was a point guard for the New York Knicks, Dallas Mavericks, Cleveland Cavaliers, Golden State Warriors and Los Angeles Clippers. Collegiately, he played for the Texas Tech Red Raiders. The Dallas Mavericks traded Huston, along with a 1983 third round draft choice to the Cavaliers in exchange for Chad Kinch and a 1985 first round draft choice on February 7, 1981.

In eight NBA seasons, he played in 496 games, having played 12,252 minutes, and scoring 4,380 points. During his NBA career he managed a 48.3 field goal percentage (1,836 for 3,805), 25.4 three-point field goal percentage (16 for 63), 70.8 free throw percentage (692 for 978), 684 total rebounds (201 offensive, 483 defensive), 2,509 assists, 331 steals, 32 blocked shots, 899 turnovers and 844 personal fouls.

After retiring as a basketball player, Huston became the director of the St. Mary's Recreation Center in the Mott Haven section of the South Bronx in New York City.

== Career statistics ==
Legend
GP	Games played	GS	Games started	MPG	Minutes per game
FG%	Field goal percentage	3P%	3-point field goal percentage	FT%	Free throw percentage
RPG	Rebounds per game	APG	Assists per game	SPG	Steals per game
BPG	Blocks per game	PPG	Points per game	**Bold**	Career high

=== NBA ===
==== Regular season ====
Year	Team	GP	GS	MPG	FG%	3P%	FT%	RPG	APG	SPG	BPG	PPG
1979–80	New York	71		13.0	.390	.176	.737	.8	2.2	.5	**.1**	3.1
1980–81	Dallas	56		33.8	.488	.250	.692	1.8	4.9	.8	**.1**	**16.1**
1980–81	Cleveland	25		21.7	.497	.000	**.815**	1.6	4.7	.5	.0	7.0
1981–82	Cleveland	78	43	30.9	.484	.300	.765	1.9	**7.6**	**.9**	**.1**	10.3
1982–83	Cleveland	80	**79**	**34.0**	.482	.333	.686	**2.0**	6.1	**.9**	**.1**	12.2
1983–84	Cleveland	77	56	26.5	.498	.182	.714	1.2	5.4	.5	.0	10.5
1984–85	Cleveland	8	0	11.6	.480	–	.667	.1	2.9	.0	.0	3.3
1985–86	Golden State	**82**	0	14.7	**.513**	.333	.685	.8	4.2	.5	.0	4.2
1986–87	L.A. Clippers	19	8	22.5	.455	**.500**	.529	.9	5.3	.7	.0	6.8
Career		496	186	24.7	.483	.254	.708	1.4	5.1	.7	.1	8.8

== Personal life ==
On October 4, 1984 Hutson was charged with disorderly conduct, resisting arrest, and sexual imposition after he became angry after asking a convienence store employee for directions. He allegedly grabbed a female customer between her legs and knocked over merchandise.

== See also ==
- List of National Basketball Association players with most assists in a game
