= Jay Vincent =

American basketball player (born 1959)

Personal information
- Born: June 10, 1959 (age 67) Kalamazoo, Michigan, U.S.
- Listed height: 6 ft 7 in (2.01 m)
- Listed weight: 220 lb (100 kg)

Career information
- High school: Eastern (Lansing, Michigan)
- College: Michigan State (1977–1981)
- NBA draft: 1981: 2nd round, 24th overall pick
- Drafted by: Dallas Mavericks
- Playing career: 1981–1993
- Position: Small forward / power forward
- Number: 31, 30, 3

Career history
- 1981–1986: Dallas Mavericks
- 1986–1987: Washington Bullets
- 1987–1989: Denver Nuggets
- 1989: San Antonio Spurs
- 1989: Philadelphia 76ers
- 1989–1990: Los Angeles Lakers
- 1990–1991: Philips Milano
- 1991–1992: Baker Livorno
- 1992–1993: Robe di Kappa Torino
- 1993: Goccia di Carnia Udine

Career highlights
- NBA All-Rookie First Team (1982); NCAA champion (1979); Third-team All-American – AP (1981); No. 31 retired by Michigan State Spartans

Career NBA statistics
- Points: 8,729 (15.2 ppg)
- Rebounds: 3,167 (5.5 rpg)
- Assists: 1,124 (2.0 apg)
- Stats at NBA.com
- Stats at Basketball Reference

Jay Fletcher Vincent (born June 10, 1959) is an American former professional basketball player. He played college basketball for the Michigan State Spartans. Vincent was selected 24th overall by the Dallas Mavericks in the 1981 NBA draft, for whom he played five seasons, followed by four seasons with five other NBA teams. Vincent also played professionally in Italy.

== College ==
A 6'7" forward, Vincent played at Michigan State University under coach, Jud Heathcote, where he teamed with Magic Johnson and Greg Kelser to win the 1979 NCAA Men's Division I Basketball Tournament. Vincent won the Big Ten scoring championship in his junior and senior years.

== Professional career ==
He was then selected by the Dallas Mavericks in the second round of the 1981 NBA draft (24th overall pick), and he went on to have a productive 9-year NBA career, playing for the Mavericks (1981–86), Washington Bullets (1986–87), Denver Nuggets (1987–89), San Antonio Spurs (1989), Philadelphia 76ers (1989–1990) and Los Angeles Lakers (1990). He concluded his NBA career in 1990 with 8,729 career points, 3,167 career rebounds, and 1,124 career assists.

== Personal life ==
Vincent is the older brother of seven-year NBA player and former NBA coach Sam Vincent.

In August 2010 it was revealed that an East Lansing, Michigan, company owned by Vincent was involved in a scam that defrauded about 20,000 people across the United States out of more than $2 million. On August 18, 2010, Vincent and another man were indicted by a federal grand jury on mail fraud charges stemming from conduct between 2006 and 2009. Vincent later pleaded guilty. In July 2011 he voluntarily revoked his bond and was jailed ahead of his September 2011 sentencing. He was sentenced to five and a half years in prison on September 2, 2011.

Upon being released in March 2016, he worked as a manager at a Battle Creek, Michigan-based restaurant called Juicy Burger, and was released from parole in July 2016.

== Career statistics ==
Legend
GP	Games played	GS	Games started	MPG	Minutes per game
FG%	Field goal percentage	3P%	3-point field goal percentage	FT%	Free throw percentage
RPG	Rebounds per game	APG	Assists per game	SPG	Steals per game
BPG	Blocks per game	PPG	Points per game	**Bold**	Career high

=== NBA ===
==== Regular season ====
Year	Team	GP	GS	MPG	FG%	3P%	FT%	RPG	APG	SPG	BPG	PPG
1981–82	Dallas	**81**	62	32.4	.497	.250	.716	7.0	2.2	**1.1**	.3	**21.4**
1982–83	Dallas	**81**	**73**	**33.7**	.489	.000	.784	7.3	**2.6**	.9	**.6**	18.7
1983–84	Dallas	61	5	23.3	.435	.000	.781	4.0	1.9	.5	.2	11.0
1984–85	Dallas	79	47	32.2	.479	.000	.836	**8.9**	2.1	.6	.3	18.2
1985–86	Dallas	80	3	24.9	.481	.000	.810	4.6	2.3	.8	.3	13.8
1986–87	Washington	51	17	27.2	.447	.000	.769	4.1	1.7	.8	.3	13.3
1987–88	Denver	73	8	24.0	.466	.250	.805	4.2	2.0	.6	.4	15.4
1988–89	Denver	5	1	19.0	.342	.500	.556	3.6	1.0	.2	.2	6.4
1988–89	San Antonio	24	3	23.0	.416	.000	.686	3.8	.9	.2	.1	9.0
1989–90	Philadelphia	17	5	15.2	.429	**1.000**	**.892**	2.1	.5	.6	.1	7.3
1989–90	L.A. Clippers	24	1	8.3	**.526**	.000	.667	1.1	.4	.3	.1	3.8
Career		576	225	27.0	.474	.148	.784	5.5	2.0	.7	.3	15.2

==== Playoffs ====
Year	Team	GP	GS	MPG	FG%	3P%	FT%	RPG	APG	SPG	BPG	PPG
1984	Dallas	**10**		**35.3**	.387	.000	**.903**	**7.0**	**1.9**	.7	.1	15.2
1985	Dallas	4	**2**	33.5	.357	–	.759	5.5	.8	**1.5**	**.8**	15.5
1986	Dallas	**10**	0	20.4	.384	–	.882	3.9	1.5	.4	.1	10.6
1987	Washington	3	0	24.0	.367	–	.889	3.0	1.0	.7	.0	10.0
1988	Denver	8	0	25.0	**.510**	.000	.850	4.6	.8	.6	.5	**17.5**
1990	L.A. Lakers	3	0	2.7	.000	–	–	.0	.0	.0	.0	.0
Career		38	2	25.6	.410	.000	.862	4.7	1.2	.6	.2	12.9
