= Joe Hassett =

American basketball player (born 1955)

Personal information
- Born: September 11, 1955 (age 71) Providence, Rhode Island, U.S.
- Listed height: 6 ft 5 in (1.96 m)
- Listed weight: 180 lb (82 kg)

Career information
- High school: La Salle Academy (Providence, Rhode Island)
- College: Providence (1973–1977)
- NBA draft: 1977: 3rd round, 52nd overall pick
- Drafted by: Seattle SuperSonics
- Playing career: 1977–1983
- Position: Shooting guard
- Number: 10, 11

Career history
- 1977–1979: Seattle SuperSonics
- 1979–1980: Indiana Pacers
- 1980: Dallas Mavericks
- 1981–1983: Golden State Warriors

Career highlights
- NBA champion (1979); Third-team All-American – NABC (1977); Second-team Parade All-American (1973)
- Stats at NBA.com
- Stats at Basketball Reference
Medals
Representing United States
Men's basketball
Pan American Games
Gold medal – first place	1975 Mexico City	Team competition

Joseph Patrick Hassett (born September 11, 1955) is an American former professional basketball player in the National Basketball Association (NBA). A 6-foot-5-inch (1.96 m), 180-pound (82 kg) shooting guard, he played college basketball for the Providence Friars, where he still shares a record with four other players to score at least 500 points in a season in three consecutive years. He also represented the U.S. in the 1975 Pan American Games in Mexico City.

Hassett was selected with the eighth pick in the third round (52nd overall) of the 1977 NBA draft by the Seattle SuperSonics. He was part of the Sonics' 1979 NBA championship-winning team, but moved on to the Indiana Pacers the following season after being released by the Sonics. In his only year with the Pacers (1979–80) he ranked fourth in the league with 69 three-pointers made. He also played with the Dallas Mavericks and Golden State Warriors, with whom he concluded his NBA career in 1982–83.

Hassett is a member of the New England Basketball Hall of Fame, the Providence College Hall of Fame, the Rhode Island Heritage Hall of Fame, and the Rhode Island Interscholastic League Hall of Fame. He is now an investment advisor/banker and provides color commentary for the Providence Friars basketball team on 103.7 FM radio.

== Career playing statistics ==
Legend
GP	Games played	GS	Games started	MPG	Minutes per game
FG%	Field goal percentage	3P%	3-point field goal percentage	FT%	Free throw percentage
RPG	Rebounds per game	APG	Assists per game	SPG	Steals per game
BPG	Blocks per game	PPG	Points per game	**Bold**	Career high
†	Won an NBA championship

=== NBA ===
==== Regular season ====
Year	Team	GP	GS	MPG	FG%	3P%	FT%	RPG	APG	SPG	BPG	PPG
1977–78	Seattle	48		8.4	.444		.833	.8	.9	.4	.0	4.0
1978–79†	Seattle	55		8.4	**.474**		**1.000**	.8	.8	.3	**.1**	4.1
1979–80	Indiana	**74**	**2**	15.3	.422	.348	.828	1.3	1.4	**.6**	**.1**	7.1
1980–81	Dallas	17		16.5	.415	.250	.769	1.5	1.1	.3	.0	8.1
1980–81	Golden State	24		18.1	.424	**.371**	.875	**1.8**	2.3	.3	**.1**	**9.1**
1981–82	Golden State	68	**2**	11.6	.377	.332	.838	.8	1.5	.4	.0	5.7
1982–83	Golden State	6	**2**	**23.2**	.432	.111	–	**1.8**	**3.5**	.3	.0	6.5
Career		292	6	12.5	.421	.336	.861	1.1	1.3	.4	.1	5.9

==== Playoffs ====
Year	Team	GP	MPG	FG%	FT%	RPG	APG	SPG	BPG	PPG
1978	Seattle	**8**	**2.8**	**.538**	–	**.3**	.0	**.1**	.0	**1.8**
1979†	Seattle	**8**	1.9	.429	–	.1	**.1**	.0	.0	.8
Career		16	2.3	.500	–	.2	.1	.1	.0	1.3
