= Oliver Mack =

American basketball player (born 1957)

Personal information
- Born: June 6, 1957 (age 69) New York City, New York, U.S.
- Listed height: 6 ft 3 in (1.91 m)
- Listed weight: 185 lb (84 kg)

Career information
- High school: William Cullen Bryant (Queens, New York)
- College: San Jacinto (1975–1977); East Carolina (1977–1979)
- NBA draft: 1979: 2nd round, 25th overall pick
- Drafted by: Los Angeles Lakers
- Position: Shooting guard
- Number: 25, 23, 17

Career history
- 1979–1980: Los Angeles Lakers
- 1980: Chicago Bulls
- 1980–1981: Dallas Mavericks
- 1982–1983: Las Vegas/Albuquerque Silvers
- 1983–1986: Louisville/La Crosse Catbirds
- 1985–1986: Wisconsin Flyers
- Stats at NBA.com
- Stats at Basketball Reference

Oliver Mack (born June 6, 1957) is an American former professional basketball player. Born in New York City, he was a 6-foot-3-inch (191 cm), 185-pound (84 kg) shooting guard. He played college basketball for East Carolina Pirates.

== Early years ==
Born June 6, 1957, in New York City, Mack attended William Cullen Bryant High School. He enrolled at San Jacinto Junior College, where he was teammate of future NBA center Alton Lister. He played two seasons, averaging 18.0 and 24.3 points respectively. As a freshman, he was the top scorer of the NJCAA tournament with 110 points in four games. As a sophomore, he led his team to the Championship game, in which they lost to Independence Community College. In both seasons, he was included in the ideal quintet of the competition.

In 1977, he transferred to NCAA Division I East Carolina University, where he played two seasons, averaging 22.0 points and 4.3 rebounds per game. As a junior, he finished ranked fourth nationally among the top scorers, with 28.0 points per game, behind only Freeman Williams (Portland State University), Larry Bird (Indiana State University) and Purvis Short (Jackson State University). He also set the school's record for the most points in a game, scoring 47 points against USC Aiken as a senior.

== Professional career ==
Mack was selected by the Los Angeles Lakers in the second round (25th overall) of the 1979 NBA draft. As a rookie, he barely had a chance of play on a team with notable players at his position, such as Magic Johnson and Norm Nixon. He played 27 games, just over 5 minutes in each of them to average 1.9 points. On February 13, he was traded along with two future second rounds draft choices to the Chicago Bulls in exchange for Mark Landsberger.

With the Bulls he gave minutes of rest to Reggie Theus and Ricky Sobers, finishing the season with 8.0 points and 2.1 rebounds per game. In 1980, after playing three games, he was released. Mack was the second-to-last Bulls player to wear the number 23 on their jersey prior to Michael Jordan's arrival on the team in 1984 (Mike Bratz, who played for the Bulls briefly in 1983, was the last player before Jordan). He signed a few weeks later as a free agent with the Dallas Mavericks.

The Mavericks coach Dick Motta gave him more playing time as a starter and he responded with his best season as a professional, averaging 10.2 points and 3.7 rebounds per game. In 1981, he was passed on the depth chart by rookie Rolando Blackman. He was cut in December.

Mack played one more season with the Las Vegas Silvers of the Continental Basketball Association, after which he retired.

== Career statistics ==
Legend
GP	Games played	GS	Games started	MPG	Minutes per game
FG%	Field goal percentage	3P%	3-point field goal percentage	FT%	Free throw percentage
RPG	Rebounds per game	APG	Assists per game	SPG	Steals per game
BPG	Blocks per game	PPG	Points per game	**Bold**	Career high

=== NBA ===
==== Regular season ====
Year	Team	GP	GS	MPG	FG%	3P%	FT%	RPG	APG	SPG	BPG	PPG
1979–80	L.A. Lakers	27		5.7	.420	.000	.500	.8	.7	.1	.0	1.9
1979–80	Chicago	23		22.9	**.517**	.000	**.879**	2.1	1.4	**.9**	**.1**	8.0
1980–81	Chicago	3		5.3	.167	–	.500	.3	.3	.3	.0	1.0
1980–81	Dallas	**62**		**26.9**	.463	.000	.642	**3.7**	**2.6**	**.9**	**.1**	**10.2**
1981–82	Dallas	13	3	11.5	.322	.000	.750	1.4	1.1	.4	**.1**	3.4
Career		128	3	19.6	.458	.000	.674	2.5	1.8	.7	.1	7.2
