= Chad Kinch =

American basketball player

Personal information
- Born: May 22, 1958 Perth Amboy, New Jersey, U.S.
- Died: April 3, 1994 (aged 35) Carteret, New Jersey, U.S.
- Listed height: 6 ft 4 in (1.93 m)
- Listed weight: 190 lb (86 kg)

Career information
- High school: Perth Amboy (Perth Amboy, New Jersey)
- College: Charlotte (1976–1980)
- NBA draft: 1980: 1st round, 22nd overall pick
- Drafted by: Cleveland Cavaliers
- Playing career: 1980–1982
- Position: Shooting guard
- Number: 20, 21

Career history
- 1980–1981: Cleveland Cavaliers
- 1981: Dallas Mavericks
- 1982: Reno Bighorns

Career highlights
- 3× First-team All-Sun Belt (1978–1980)
- Stats at NBA.com
- Stats at Basketball Reference

Chadwick Oliver Kinch (May 22, 1958 – April 3, 1994) was an American professional basketball player. He played college basketball for the Charlotte 49ers and was selected in the 1980 NBA draft by the Cleveland Cavaliers. Kinch played for one season in the National Basketball Association (NBA) for the Cavaliers and Dallas Mavericks. He finished his basketball career with a short stint for the Reno Bighorns of the Continental Basketball Association in 1982. After his playing retirement, Kinch descended into a drug habit and eventually contracted HIV. He died of AIDS-related complications in 1994 at the age of 35.

== Early life ==
Kinch was raised in Perth Amboy, New Jersey. His father, Raymond Sr., worked in construction and his mother, Pauline, worked as a community organizer for the board of education. Kinch and his two siblings, Raymond Jr. and Arlene, were encouraged to participate in athletics by their parents; Raymond Sr. was a baseball player who was invited to a tryout with the Brooklyn Dodgers as a teenager and Pauline played college softball.

Kinch attended Perth Amboy High School where he was called up to the varsity basketball team during his freshman season. His first coach, Bill "Bugsy" Buglovsky, subjugated Kinch in his system and prioritised another player whose career he was pushing. Buglovsky told Kinch that he would not succeed as a basketball player, talked him down to recruiters and did not pass on recruiting letters sent to Kinch at the school. Buglovsky was replaced by John Mazurek for Kinch's senior season and Kinch began to rise in prominence. He first committed to play college basketball for the Seton Hall Pirates but decided to play further from home after he played in Europe with an Amateur Athletic Union team. Kinch instead committed to play for the Charlotte 49ers where he had an opportunity to be an immediate starter.

== College career ==
Kinch averaged 15.3 points per game during his freshman season with the Charlotte 49ers when they qualified for the 1977 NCAA Division I basketball tournament. In the Mideast Regional Final against the No. 1 ranked Michigan Wolverines, Kinch drove the baseline and dunked on Phil Hubbard before the 49ers went on to upset the Wolverines.

Kinch was a three-time All-Sun Belt Conference first-team selection. He scored 2,020 points during his 49ers career and ranked second in program history at the time of his departure.

== Professional career ==
Kinch was selected in the 1980 NBA draft by the Cleveland Cavaliers. He was chosen at the request of head coach Stan Albeck who departed the team before the start of the season. Kinch arrived at the Cavaliers training camp overweight. He clashed with new Cavaliers head coach Bill Musselman who he compared to The Great Santini. Kinch averaged 2.8 points per game in 29 appearances with the Cavaliers. On February 7, 1981, the Cavaliers traded Kinch, along with a 1985 first-round draft choice, to the Dallas Mavericks in exchange for Geoff Huston and a 1983 third-round draft choice. He scored 32 points in 12 games for the Mavericks.

In October 1982, Kinch agreed to join the Reno Bighorns for their inaugural season in the Continental Basketball Association. He averaged 11.5 points and 1.1 assists in eight games played. On December 29, he left the team to take a job with Aetna Life Insurance Co. in Charlotte, North Carolina.

Kinch was invited to training camp with the Indiana Pacers in 1983.

== Post-playing career ==
Kinch lived in Charlotte after his playing career and worked as a bus dispatcher. He married his wife, Kay, and had a son in 1983. Kinch separated from Kay and returned to New Jersey where he worked for the United Parcel Service. He returned often to Charlotte to visit his son.

== Career statistics ==
Legend
GP	Games played	GS	Games started	MPG	Minutes per game
FG%	Field goal percentage	3P%	3-point field goal percentage	FT%	Free throw percentage
RPG	Rebounds per game	APG	Assists per game	SPG	Steals per game
BPG	Blocks per game	PPG	Points per game	**Bold**	Career high

=== NBA ===
==== Regular season ====
Year	Team	GP	MPG	FG%	3P%	FT%	RPG	APG	SPG	BPG	PPG
1980–81	Cleveland	**29**	8.5	**.396**	–	**.800**	**.8**	**1.2**	**.3**	**.2**	2.8
1980–81	Dallas	12	**8.8**	.311	–	.769	**.8**	.8	.2	.1	**3.2**
Career		41	8.6	.369	–	.778	.8	1.1	.3	.1	2.9

== Personal life ==
Kinch's older brother, Raymond, played for the Rutgers Scarlet Knights football team. On December 26, 1977, Raymond died in a house fire at the family's home in Perth Amboy. Kinch was close with Raymond and never talked about him after his death.

Kinch struggled with drug abuse after his basketball career and used a needle that was infected with HIV. Kinch spent the last months of his life in and out of hospices. He made the decision to spend his final days at his parent's home in Cartaret, New Jersey, and died of AIDS on April 3, 1994.
