= Tom LaGarde =

American basketball player

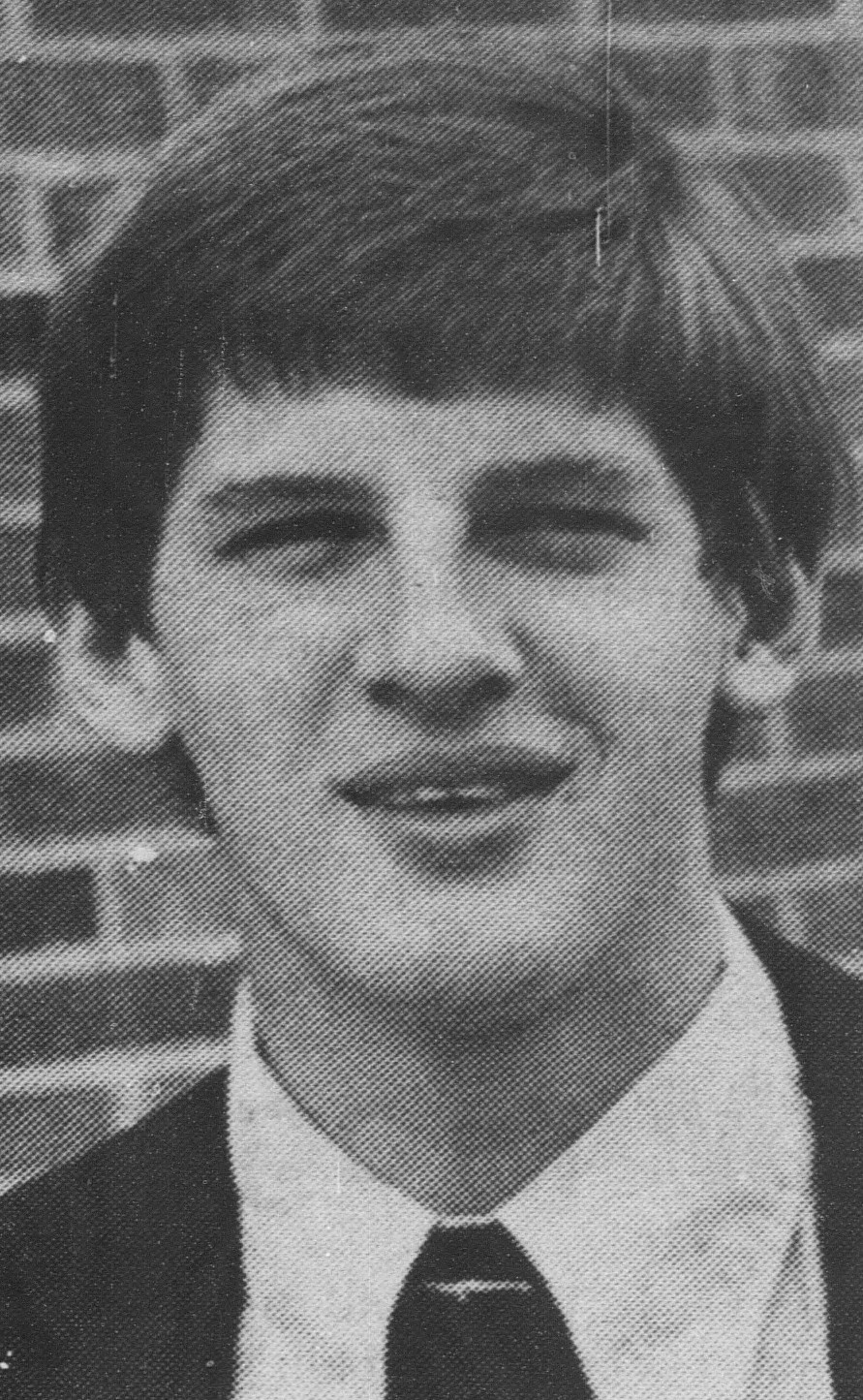
- LaGarde, circa 1976

Personal information
- Born: February 10, 1955 (age 71) Detroit, Michigan, U.S.
- Listed height: 6 ft 10 in (2.08 m)
- Listed weight: 220 lb (100 kg)

Career information
- High school: Detroit Catholic Central (Detroit, Michigan)
- College: North Carolina (1973–1977)
- NBA draft: 1977: 1st round, 9th overall pick
- Drafted by: Denver Nuggets
- Playing career: 1977–1984
- Position: Center / power forward
- Number: 45, 23, 25, 34

Career history
- 1977–1978: Denver Nuggets
- 1978–1980: Seattle SuperSonics
- 1980–1982: Dallas Mavericks
- 1982–1984: Ginnastica Goriziana
- 1984: New Jersey Nets

Career highlights
- NBA champion (1979); Second-team All-ACC (1977); First-team Parade All-American (1973)

Career NBA statistics
- Points: 2,376 (7.6 ppg)
- Rebounds: 1,593 (5.1 rpg)
- Assists: 456 (1.5 apg)
- Stats at NBA.com
- Stats at Basketball Reference
Medals
Men's basketball
Representing the United States
Olympic Games
| Gold medal – first place | 1976 Montreal | Team competition |
Pan American Games
| Gold medal – first place | 1975 Mexico City | Team competition |

Thomas Joseph LaGarde (born February 10, 1955) is an American former professional basketball player. He played in the National Basketball Association (NBA) from 1977 to 1985 before a recurring knee issue cut short his career. He earned a gold medal as a member of Team USA in the 1976 Olympics. LaGarde also was a member of an NBA championship team with the Seattle SuperSonics three years later, although torn right knee ligaments forced him to sit out the final five months of the season.

== Basketball career ==
After playing collegiately at the University of North Carolina, LaGarde was selected 9th overall in the first round of the 1977 NBA draft by the Denver Nuggets.

At 6'10" and 220 lb, LaGarde played forward and center at the pro level. In June, 1978, shortly after his rookie season with the Nuggets, LaGarde was traded to the Seattle SuperSonics in return for a first-round draft choice.

LaGarde was selected by the expansion Dallas Mavericks in the 1980 expansion draft. He was the only team member who played all 82 games for the Mavericks in their inaugural 1980–81 season, finishing second on the team in points to Jim Spanarkel and leading the team in rebounds and blocked shots.

LaGarde saw his playing time diminish the following season, averaging just 19 minutes per game in 47 games for the Mavericks. He played the two following seasons overseas.

In November 1984, LaGarde returned briefly to the NBA with the New Jersey Nets as a replacement for the injured Darryl Dawkins. But the comeback lasted only one game before a calf injury ended his season and career.

== Personal life ==
In 2008, LaGarde created a video parody of McCain-Palin called the Original Mavericks for Truth.

LaGarde and his wife, Heather, live in Saxapahaw, North Carolina, with their two children. Together, they redeveloped an old mill, which is now a 700-person music venue, called the Haw River Ballroom.

== Career statistics ==
Legend
| GP | Games played | GS | Games started | MPG | Minutes per game |
| FG% | Field goal percentage | 3P% | 3-point field goal percentage | FT% | Free throw percentage |
| RPG | Rebounds per game | APG | Assists per game | SPG | Steals per game |
| BPG | Blocks per game | PPG | Points per game | **Bold** | Career high |
| † | Won an NBA championship |

=== NBA ===
==== Regular season ====
| Year | Team | GP | GS | MPG | FG% | 3P% | FT% | RPG | APG | SPG | BPG | PPG |
|---|---|---|---|---|---|---|---|---|---|---|---|---|
| 1977–78 | Denver | 77 | | 11.3 | .405 | | **.760** | 2.8 | .6 | .2 | .2 | 4.0 |
| 1978–79† | Seattle | 23 | | 25.0 | **.541** | | .600 | **8.3** | 1.4 | .3 | **.8** | 11.0 |
| 1979–80 | Seattle | **82** | | 14.2 | .477 | – | .657 | 3.8 | 1.1 | .2 | .4 | 4.7 |
| 1980–81 | Dallas | **82** | **82** | **32.6** | .470 | – | .649 | 8.1 | **2.9** | **.4** | .5 | **13.7** |
| 1981–82 | Dallas | 47 | 28 | 19.3 | .420 | .000 | .518 | 4.5 | 1.0 | **.4** | .4 | 6.6 |
| 1984–85 | New Jersey | 1 | 0 | 8.0 | .000 | – | .500 | 2.0 | .0 | .0 | .0 | 1.0 |
| Career | | 312 | 110 | 19.9 | .462 | .000 | .640 | 5.1 | 1.5 | .3 | .4 | 7.6 |

==== Playoffs ====
| Year | Team | GP | MPG | FG% | 3P% | FT% | RPG | APG | SPG | BPG | PPG |
|---|---|---|---|---|---|---|---|---|---|---|---|
| 1978 | Denver | 9 | 8.6 | **.526** | | .714 | 2.0 | .8 | .0 | **.2** | 2.8 |
| 1980 | Seattle | **14** | **11.6** | .370 | – | **.818** | **2.9** | **.9** | **.1** | .0 | **3.1** |
| Career | | 23 | 10.4 | .415 | – | .778 | 2.5 | .8 | .1 | .1 | 3.0 |
