= Brad Davis (basketball) =

American basketball player

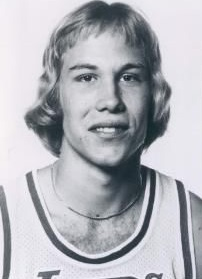
- Davis with the Los Angeles Lakers in 1977

Personal information
- Born: December 17, 1955 (age 70) Monaca, Pennsylvania, U.S.
- Listed height: 6 ft 3 in (1.91 m)
- Listed weight: 180 lb (82 kg)

Career information
- High school: Monaca (Monaca, Pennsylvania)
- College: Maryland (1974–1977)
- NBA draft: 1977: 1st round, 15th overall pick
- Drafted by: Los Angeles Lakers
- Playing career: 1977–1992
- Position: Point guard
- Number: 30, 20, 12, 15
- Coaching career: 1992–2021

Career history

Playing
- 1977–1978: Los Angeles Lakers
- 1978–1979: Montana Sky
- 1979: Indiana Pacers
- 1979–1980: Anchorage Northern Knights
- 1980: Utah Jazz
- 1980–1992: Dallas Mavericks

Career highlights
- No. 15 retired by Dallas Mavericks; CBA champion (1980); All-CBA Second Team (1980); CBA Newcomer of the Year (1980); 2× Second-team All-ACC (1975, 1977); Third-team Parade All-American (1974)

Career NBA statistics
- Points: 7,866 (8.2 ppg)
- Rebounds: 1,738 (1.8 rpg)
- Assists: 4,709 (4.9 apg)
- Stats at NBA.com
- Stats at Basketball Reference

Bradley Ernest Davis (born December 17, 1955) is an American former professional basketball player who spent the bulk of his National Basketball Association (NBA) career with the Dallas Mavericks. He has been associated with the Mavericks for the team's entire existence as either a player, assistant coach or broadcaster.

== Early years ==
Born in Monaca, Pennsylvania, Davis graduated from Monaca High School and played basketball there under head coach Dave Nichol. As a senior, he received Class B all-Pennsylvania honors. Davis also tried out for the Pittsburgh Pirates of Major League Baseball.

== College career ==
Davis accepted a basketball scholarship from the University of Maryland, to play under head coach Lefty Driesell. As a freshman, he was named the starter at point guard, playing alongside guard John Lucas, while averaging 12.6 points, 4.6 assists and 3.3 rebounds.

As a junior, he averaged 12.4 points, 4.9 assists, 3.5 rebounds and 0.9 steals. He declared for the NBA draft after the season, finishing with an average of 12.2 points and 5.1 assists per game during his three-year stint in college.

== Professional career ==
Davis was selected by the Los Angeles Lakers in the first round (15th pick overall) of the 1977 NBA draft. As a rookie, he missed eight weeks with a broken hand and was passed on the depth chart by fellow rookie Norm Nixon. In his second season, he was waived after 10 games on October 27, 1978.

In 1978, he played with the Montana Sky of the Western Basketball Association. Although he was a teammate of Cazzie Russell, the squad finished in last place.

On February 12, 1979, he signed as a free agent with the Indiana Pacers, to provide depth after Kevin Stacom was traded. He was released eighteen games into the 1979–80 season on October 20. In 1979, he signed with the Anchorage Northern Knights of the Continental Basketball Association (CBA), where he helped them win the league championship. He was selected as the CBA Newcomer of the Year and named to the All-CBA Second Team in 1980.

On February 29, 1980, he was signed as a free agent by the Utah Jazz. The coaching staff didn't feel that he was going to make the team, so the organization gave the Pistons permission to invite Davis to their camp, by making him a free agent.

On April 24, 1980, he was invited to a two-day tryout camp by the Detroit Pistons. On July 11, he signed a free agent contract with the Detroit Pistons. He was cut on October 8. He played with the Anchorage Northern Knights of the Continental Basketball Association during the 1979–80 basketball season.

On December 2, 1980, Davis signed as a free agent with the NBA expansion team Dallas Mavericks, when the franchise was nearly two months into the 1980–81 season and became the starting point guard. On March 27, 1981, he signed a contract extension. In the 1982–83 season, set a team record with 7.2 assists per game, set an NBA record for a guard with a .572 field goal percentage and tied for the team lead with 80 steals. On June 23, 1983, he signed a contract extension. He became a fan favorite and spent the rest of his NBA career (12 seasons) with the Mavericks. In the 1984–85 season, he ranked third in the league in 3-point shooting and free-throw percentage. In the 1987–88 season, he was a part of a team that reached the Western Conference Finals only to lose to the eventual champion Los Angeles Lakers in seven games. On August 1, 1992, he announced his official retirement. He averaged 8.6 points, 5.1 assists, 1.9 rebounds and 24.2 minutes per game during his career.

Davis was the final Maverick remaining from the team's first season, the franchise leader in assists, games played and minutes played. On November 14, 1992, Davis was the first Maverick to have his number retired when his #15 jersey was raised to the rafters of Reunion Arena.

== Personal life ==
In 1993, Davis became an assistant for the Mavericks under head coach Dick Motta. At the same time, he took a position as the color commentator for Mavericks televised games. He later moved to radio broadcasts.

Davis was the radio analyst until the 2007–08 season, when he swapped positions with Mavericks TV commentator Bob Ortegel. They later switched back to their original roles and Davis remained the color commentator on Mavericks' radio broadcasts. He also serves as the Mavericks' player development coach and a community services representative for the team.

He is the brother of former NBA player Mickey Davis. He is married to Kelli Davis and father to three children: son Michael and daughters Erin and Cara Davis.

== Career statistics ==
Legend
GP	Games played	GS	Games started	MPG	Minutes per game
FG%	Field goal percentage	3P%	3-point field goal percentage	FT%	Free throw percentage
RPG	Rebounds per game	APG	Assists per game	SPG	Steals per game
BPG	Blocks per game	PPG	Points per game	**Bold**	Career high
*	Led the league

=== NBA ===
==== Regular season ====
Year	Team	GP	GS	MPG	FG%	3P%	FT%	RPG	APG	SPG	BPG	PPG
1977–78	L.A. Lakers	33		10.1	.417		.759	1.1	2.5	.5	.1	2.5
1978–79	L.A. Lakers	5		13.0	**.727**		.750	.2	1.8	.4	.0	3.8
1978–79	Indiana	22	0	10.6	.523		.684	.7	2.0	.6	.1	2.7
1979–80	Indiana	5	0	8.6	.286	–	.750	.4	1.0	.6	.0	1.4
1979–80	Utah	13		17.3	.589	.000	.833	1.2	3.5	.8	.1	5.8
1980–81	Dallas	56		30.1	.561	.176	.799	2.7	6.9	.9	**.2**	11.2
1981–82	Dallas	**82**	**82**	31.9	.515	.286	.804	**2.8**	6.2	.9	.1	**12.1**
1982–83	Dallas	79	78	29.4	.572	.256	.845	2.5	**7.2**	1.0	.1	11.6
1983–84	Dallas	81	81	**32.9**	.530	.184	.836	2.3	6.9	**1.2**	**.2**	11.1
1984–85	Dallas	**82***	**82***	31.0	.505	**.409**	**.888**	2.4	7.1	1.1	.1	10.1
1985–86	Dallas	**82**	43	24.0	.532	.360	.868	1.8	5.7	.7	**.2**	9.3
1986–87	Dallas	**82***	6	19.3	.456	.302	.860	1.4	4.5	.8	.1	7.0
1987–88	Dallas	75	12	19.7	.501	.405	.843	1.4	4.0	.7	**.2**	7.2
1988–89	Dallas	78	4	17.9	.483	.314	.805	1.4	3.1	.6	**.2**	6.4
1989–90	Dallas	73	2	17.7	.490	.337	.770	1.3	3.3	.6	.1	6.4
1990–91	Dallas	80	6	17.8	.426	.259	.771	1.5	2.9	.6	**.2**	5.4
1991–92	Dallas	33	0	13.0	.442	.278	.733	1.0	2.0	.3	.1	2.8
Career		961	396	23.2	.510	.321	.828	1.8	4.9	.8	.2	8.2

==== Playoffs ====
Year	Team	GP	GS	MPG	FG%	3P%	FT%	RPG	APG	SPG	BPG	PPG
1984	Dallas	10		**30.4**	.452	.000	.789	1.9	5.0	.6	.0	8.1
1985	Dallas	4	**4**	28.3	.500	.375	**.923**	2.0	**5.5**	**1.0**	**.3**	**10.3**
1986	Dallas	10	0	16.3	.545	**.667**	.792	1.9	2.3	.3	.0	7.7
1987	Dallas	4	0	18.8	.565	.000	.778	**2.3**	4.3	.0	.0	8.3
1988	Dallas	**17**	0	17.4	**.600**	.200	**.923**	1.2	3.2	.2	**.3**	6.4
Career		45	4	21.1	.530	.438	.846	1.7	3.7	.4	.1	7.6
