= Stan Pietkiewicz =

American basketball player

Personal information
- Born: July 14, 1956 (age 70) Huntsville, Alabama, U.S.
- Listed height: 6 ft 5 in (1.96 m)
- Listed weight: 200 lb (91 kg)

Career information
- High school: Winter Park (Winter Park, Florida)
- College: Auburn (1974–1978)
- NBA draft: 1978: 7th round, 133rd overall pick
- Drafted by: Buffalo Braves
- Playing career: 1978–1984
- Position: Shooting guard / small forward
- Number: 22, 43

Career history
- 1978: San Diego Clippers
- 1978–1979: Anchorage Northern Knights
- 1979–1980: San Diego Clippers
- 1980–1981: Alberta Dusters
- 1981: Dallas Mavericks
- 1981–1984: Basket Brescia
- 1984: Scavolini Pesaro

Career highlights
- All-CBA First Team (1979); Second-team All-SEC (1978)
- Stats at NBA.com
- Stats at Basketball Reference

Stanley Thomas Pietkiewicz (born July 14, 1956) is an American former professional basketball player. He was a 6 ft 5 in (1.96 m), 200 lb (91 kg) shooting guard and played collegiately at Auburn University. He had a brief career in the National Basketball Association (NBA).

Born in Huntsville, Alabama, Pietkiewicz was selected with the second pick of the seventh round in the 1978 NBA draft by the Buffalo Braves. In 1978, the Braves moved their franchise to California, and became the San Diego Clippers. Pietkiewicz was a member of the Clippers' inaugural roster, during the 1978–79 season. After signing two 10-day contracts with the Dallas Mavericks in 1981, he was signed for the remainder of the 1980–81 season, during which he played 36 games, averaging 3.9 points, 1.1 rebounds and 1.8 assists per game.

Pietkiewicz played for the Anchorage Northern Knights of the Continental Basketball Association (CBA) during the 1978–79 season and was selected to the All-CBA First Team.

After his NBA career, Pietkiewicz played professionally in Italy.

In 2007, Stan Pietkiewicz's son John signed a letter of intent to play with the Flagler College men's basketball team in 2007–08.

== Career statistics ==
Legend
GP	Games played	GS	Games started	MPG	Minutes per game
FG%	Field goal percentage	3P%	3-point field goal percentage	FT%	Free throw percentage
RPG	Rebounds per game	APG	Assists per game	SPG	Steals per game
BPG	Blocks per game	PPG	Points per game	**Bold**	Career high

=== NBA ===
==== Regular season ====
Year	Team	GP	MPG	FG%	3P%	FT%	RPG	APG	SPG	BPG	PPG
1978–79	San Diego	4	8.0	.125		**1.000**	**1.5**	.8	.3	.0	1.0
1979–80	San Diego	**50**	11.5	**.508**	.250	.804	.9	1.9	**.5**	**.1**	**4.6**
1980–81	San Diego	6	5.0	.400	–	–	.2	.3	.0	.0	.7
1980–81	Dallas	36	**12.0**	.414	**.396**	.786	1.1	**2.1**	.4	**.1**	3.9
Career		96	11.1	.458	.333	.806	1.0	1.8	.4	.1	3.9
