= Abdul Jeelani =

American basketball player

Personal information
- Born: February 10, 1954 Bells, Tennessee, U.S.
- Died: August 3, 2016 (aged 62) Racine, Wisconsin, U.S.
- Listed height: 6 ft 8 in (2.03 m)
- Listed weight: 210 lb (95 kg)

Career information
- High school: Washington Park (Racine, Wisconsin)
- College: Wisconsin–Parkside (1972–1976)
- NBA draft: 1976: 3rd round, 50th overall pick
- Drafted by: Cleveland Cavaliers
- Playing career: 1976–1989
- Position: Small forward
- Number: 11

Career history
- 1976–1979: Lazio
- 1979–1980: Portland Trail Blazers
- 1980–1981: Dallas Mavericks
- 1981–1985: Libertas Livorno
- 1985–1987: Saski Baskonia
- 1987–1988: Askatuak SBT
- 1988–1989: CB Sevilla
- Stats at NBA.com
- Stats at Basketball Reference

Abdul Qadir Jeelani (born Gary Cole; February 10, 1954 – August 3, 2016) was an American professional basketball player. Born in Bells, Tennessee, he was a 6'8" and 210 lb small forward and played college basketball for the Wisconsin–Parkside Rangers. He had a brief career in the National Basketball Association (NBA).

== College career ==
Jeelani is the University of Wisconsin–Parkside's career leader in points scored (2,262) and rebounds (1,237) and he holds records in the top four of seven other single-game, single-season and career statistical categories. He twice scored 47 points in a game, one of the top records for a single game scoring performance. He was a member of two NAIA National Tournament teams in 1974 and 1975 and was named an NAIA All-American in 1975 and 1976. He attended Washington Park High School in Racine, Wisconsin.

== Professional career ==
Jeelani was drafted on June 8, 1976, by the NBA's Cleveland Cavaliers in the third round of the 1976 draft, and he was waived in October of that year. Later he was signed by the Detroit Pistons on September 2, 1977, but was again waived a month later, prior to the start of the 1977–78 season. He played one season with the Portland Trail Blazers in 1979–80 and was made available in the expansion draft on May 28, 1980, where he was taken by the Dallas Mavericks prior to their inaugural season in 1980–81. He was part of the starting lineup for the Mavericks' first NBA game in 1980 and scored the first points in franchise history. In his first season with the Mavs, he seemed to have a knack for scoring in the final quarter of games. As of January 20, 1981, when he had played 43 games, 142 of his 350 points had come in the last period.

Jeelani also had a career overseas playing in Italy, in Lazio Basket and Libertas Livorno and Spain.

== Personal life ==
Jeelani became interested in Islam as a college student. He formally converted and changed his name in 1976.

Jeelani died on August 3, 2016, at Wheaton Franciscan All-Saints hospital in Racine.

== Career statistics ==
Legend
GP	Games played	GS	Games started	MPG	Minutes per game
FG%	Field goal percentage	3P%	3-point field goal percentage	FT%	Free throw percentage
RPG	Rebounds per game	APG	Assists per game	SPG	Steals per game
BPG	Blocks per game	PPG	Points per game	**Bold**	Career high

=== NBA ===
==== Regular season ====
Year	Team	GP	MPG	FG%	3P%	FT%	RPG	APG	SPG	BPG	PPG
1979–80	Portland	**77**	16.7	**.510**	.000	.789	**3.5**	**1.2**	.5	**.5**	**9.6**
1980–81	Dallas	66	**16.8**	.425	.000	**.814**	**3.5**	1.0	**.7**	**.5**	8.4
Career		143	16.7	.473	.000	.802	3.5	1.1	.6	.5	9.0
