= Bill Robinzine =

American basketball player (1953-1982)

Personal information
- Born: January 20, 1953 Chicago, Illinois, U.S.
- Died: September 16, 1982 (aged 29) Kansas City, Missouri, U.S.
- Listed height: 6 ft 7 in (2.01 m)
- Listed weight: 230 lb (104 kg)

Career information
- High school: Wendell Phillips Academy (Chicago, Illinois)
- College: DePaul (1972–1975)
- NBA draft: 1975: 1st round, 10th overall pick
- Drafted by: Kansas City Kings
- Playing career: 1975–1982
- Position: Power forward
- Number: 52, 50, 54

Career history
- 1975–1980: Kansas City Kings
- 1980: Cleveland Cavaliers
- 1980–1981: Dallas Mavericks
- 1981–1982: Utah Jazz

Career NBA statistics
- Points: 5,541 (10.5 ppg)
- Rebounds: 3,209 (6.1 rpg)
- Assists: 560 (1.1 apg)
- Stats at NBA.com
- Stats at Basketball Reference

William Clintard Robinzine (January 20, 1953 – September 16, 1982) was an American professional basketball player.

Born in Chicago, Robinzine was a 6' 7" power forward from DePaul University. He played seven seasons (1975–1982) in the National Basketball Association (NBA), competing for the Kansas City Kings, Cleveland Cavaliers, Dallas Mavericks, and Utah Jazz. He is perhaps best remembered for his inclusion in the highlight footage of Darryl Dawkins' backboard-shattering dunk at Kansas City's Kemper Arena on November 13, 1979. Robinzine, who was under the basket at the time, fled while shielding his face in order to avoid falling glass, which inspired Dawkins to include the phrase "Robinzine Cryin'" when later creating a name for the dunk.

== Family legacy ==
The Robinzine family has been recognized for its multigenerational impact in athletics and entertainment. The lineage begins with William C. Robinzine Sr., who broke racial barriers as the first African-American basketball player at DePaul University in 1955 and was later inducted into the school’s Athletic Hall of Fame. His legacy was carried forward through relatives who achieved success at the highest levels of sport and culture. Kevin Robinzine earned Olympic gold as part of the U.S. 4×400m relay team at the 1988 Seoul Games, while Bill Robinzine played seven seasons in the NBA as a power forward for the Kansas City Kings and Utah Jazz. Later generations extended the family’s influence beyond athletics: Toni Romeo Robinzine became known as a producer in the music and entertainment industry, and Christopher-Aaron Jerel Smith (Aaron Smith) competed in collegiate track and football, continuing the family’s tradition of athletic excellence.

== Notable individuals ==
- William C. Robinzine Sr. (1932–2000) — first African-American basketball player at DePaul University (1955); inducted into the DePaul Athletic Hall of Fame in 2001.
- Bill Robinzine (1953–1982) — NBA power forward (Kansas City Kings, Utah Jazz).
- Kevin Robinzine (born 1966) — U.S. Olympic gold medalist (4×400m relay, Seoul 1988).
- Toni Romeo Robinzine (born 1981) — American producer in the music and entertainment industry.
- Christopher-Aaron Jerel Smith (Aaron Smith, born 1989) — American sprinter and football player; competed at Benedict College and later as a wide receiver for Syracuse Strong Football.

== NBA player profile ==
Robinzine was known as a tough rebounder and one of the better defensive players in the league at the power forward position. He played for the Kings for five seasons often averaging double digits in scoring, and then was released to make room for Reggie King. After playing in a diminished role in Cleveland, Robinzine got a rejuvenated career with the Dallas Mavericks. In Dallas, Robinzine became one of the leading scorers along with Jim Spanarkel. He signed with the Utah Jazz for the 1981–82 season, where his role had diminished and he fell out of Utah's rotation. Jazz general manager Frank Layden had told Robinzine that if he were to offer him a contract it would be for less money, and Robinzine had already rejected small offers to play overseas.

== Death ==
In September 1982, Robinzine committed suicide in his car by carbon monoxide poisoning at a self-storage facility in Kansas City, Missouri. Robinzine, though on the outside seeming very optimistic, was not on any NBA team's roster at that time and had been distraught over not getting any new contract offers after what he felt was a year in Utah where his playing time had diminished. His wife, Claudia, had said that he "couldn't reconcile not being in the NBA anymore." He was also upset over financial problems that close friends as well as financial advisors had all told him were extremely manageable, despite what he had thought.

== Career statistics ==
Legend
GP	Games played	GS	Games started	MPG	Minutes per game
FG%	Field goal percentage	3P%	3-point field goal percentage	FT%	Free throw percentage
RPG	Rebounds per game	APG	Assists per game	SPG	Steals per game
BPG	Blocks per game	PPG	Points per game	**Bold**	Career high
*	Led the league

=== NBA ===
==== Regular season ====
Year	Team	GP	GS	MPG	FG%	3P%	FT%	RPG	APG	SPG	BPG	PPG
1975–76	Kansas City	75		17.7	.459		.732	4.7	.8	1.1	.1	8.0
1976–77	Kansas City	75		21.3	.453		.736	6.3	1.3	1.1	.2	10.3
1977–78	Kansas City	**82**		21.3	.451		.760	6.6	.9	.9	.1	10.0
1978–79	Kansas City	**82***		26.6	**.548**		.732	**7.8**	1.3	**1.3**	.2	13.4
1979–80	Kansas City	81		23.7	.501	**.500**	.730	6.5	.8	**1.3**	**.3**	11.4
1980–81	Cleveland	8		10.5	.438	–	.625	1.6	.6	.5	.0	4.1
1980–81	Dallas	70		**27.6**	.476	.167	.780	7.4	**1.6**	1.0	.1	**13.9**
1981–82	Utah	56	9	11.6	.446		**.813**	2.6	.9	.7	.1	5.8
Career		529	9	21.6	.482	.250	.749	6.1	1.1	1.1	.2	10.5

==== Playoffs ====
Year	Team	GP	MPG	FG%	3P%	FT%	RPG	APG	SPG	BPG	PPG
1979	Kansas City	**5**	**23.6**	.431		**.750**	**7.6**	**.6**	**2.6**	.0	10.0
1980	Kansas City	3	23.0	**.542**	–	.700	6.0	.0	1.0	.0	**11.0**
Career		8	23.4	.467	–	.722	6.8	.4	2.0	.0	10.4

== See also ==
- List of basketball players who died during their careers
