= Granelli =

Granelli is an Italian surname. Notable people with the surname include:

- Andy Granelli (born 1979), American drummer
- Jerry Granelli (1940–2021), American-born Canadian jazz drummer
- Luigi Granelli (1929–1999), Italian politician
- Mireille Granelli (born 1936), French actress

== See also ==
- Gianelli
- Granelli's Ice Cream, founded in Sheffield, England in 1873.
