= 1972–73 New York Knicks season =

Season of National Basketball Association team the New York Knicks

- NBA champions
- Conference champions
- Head coach: Red Holzman
- General manager: Red Holzman
- Arena: Madison Square Garden

Results
- Record: 57–25 (.695)
- Place: Division: 2nd (Atlantic); Conference: 3rd (Eastern)
- Playoff finish: NBA champions (Defeated Lakers 4–1)
- Stats at Basketball Reference

Local media
- Television: WOR–TV 9 (Bob Wolff and Cal Ramsey); Manhattan Cable Television (Bob Wolff and Cal Ramsey)
- Radio: WNBC–AM 660 (Marv Albert and John Andariese)

The 1972–73 New York Knicks season was the 27th season of NBA basketball in New York City. The Knicks captured their second NBA title as they defeated the Los Angeles Lakers in the NBA Finals, four games to one, which was exactly the same count the Knicks lost to the Lakers a year earlier. This was Knicks' last championship until 2026, and their last season with a Finals appearance before 1994.

The team featured several players who were later inducted into the Hall of Fame, including Dave DeBusschere, Walt "Clyde" Frazier, Jerry Lucas, Earl "The Pearl" Monroe, Willis Reed, future U.S. Senator Bill Bradley, and future Hall of Fame coach Phil Jackson. As of 2025, the 1972–73 Knicks remain the most recent NBA championship team whose five regular starters have all been inducted into the Hall of Fame.

== Draft picks ==
Note: This is not an extensive list; it only covers the first and second rounds, and any other players picked by the franchise that played at least one game in the league.

Round	Pick	Player	Position	Nationality	School/Club team
1	8	Tom Riker	F/C	United States	South Carolina
4	58	Henry Bibby	G	United States	UCLA

== Roster ==
1972–73 New York Knicks roster
Players

Pos.	No.	Player	Height	Weight	DOB	From
SG	12	Dick Barnett	6 ft 4 in (1.93 m)	190 lb (86 kg)	1936–10–02	Tennessee State
PG	17	Henry Bibby	6 ft 1 in (1.85 m)	185 lb (84 kg)	1949–11–24	UCLA
SF	24	Bill Bradley	6 ft 5 in (1.96 m)	205 lb (93 kg)	1943–07–28	Princeton
PF	22	Dave DeBusschere	6 ft 6 in (1.98 m)	220 lb (100 kg)	1940–10–16	Detroit Mercy
PG	10	Walt Frazier	6 ft 4 in (1.93 m)	200 lb (91 kg)	1945–03–29	Southern Illinois
C	40	John Gianelli	6 ft 10 in (2.08 m)	220 lb (100 kg)	1950–06–10	Pacific
PF	18	Phil Jackson	6 ft 8 in (2.03 m)	220 lb (100 kg)	1945–09–17	North Dakota
PF	32	Jerry Lucas	6 ft 8 in (2.03 m)	230 lb (104 kg)	1940–03–30	Ohio State
SG	7	Dean Meminger	6 ft 0 in (1.83 m)	175 lb (79 kg)	1948–05–13	Marquette
SG	15	Earl Monroe	6 ft 3 in (1.91 m)	185 lb (84 kg)	1944–11–21	Winston-Salem State
C	23	Luther Rackley	6 ft 10 in (2.08 m)	220 lb (100 kg)	1946–06–11	Xavier
C	19	Willis Reed	6 ft 9 in (2.06 m)	235 lb (107 kg)	1942–06–25	Grambling State
C	6	Tom Riker	6 ft 10 in (2.08 m)	225 lb (102 kg)	1950–02–28	South Carolina
PF	43	Harthorne Wingo	6 ft 6 in (1.98 m)	210 lb (95 kg)	1947–09–09	Friendship College

Coaches
Head coach
- Red Holzman
Assistant(s)
- Dick McGuire

Legend
- (DP) Unsigned draft pick
- (FA) Free agent
- (S) Suspended
- Injured

Roster
Updated: 1973–05–10

== Preseason ==
=== Game log ===
1972–73 Preseason game log
September/October

Game	Date	Time	Opponent	Score	Location	Attendance	Record

All times are in Eastern time.

== Regular season ==
=== Standings ===
Atlantic Division	W	L	PCT	GB	Home	Road	Neutral	Div
y-Boston Celtics	68	14	.829	–	33–6	32–8	3–0	18–4
x-New York Knicks	57	25	.695	11	35–6	21–18	1–1	16–6
Buffalo Braves	21	61	.256	47	14–27	6–31	1–3	8–14
Philadelphia 76ers	9	73	.110	59	5–26	2–36	2–11	2–20

#	Eastern Conference			
#	Team	W	L	PCT
1	z-Boston Celtics	68	14	.829
2	x-New York Knicks	57	25	.695
3	y-Baltimore Bullets	52	30	.634
4	x-Atlanta Hawks	46	36	.561
5	Houston Rockets	33	49	.402
6	Cleveland Cavaliers	32	50	.390
7	Buffalo Braves	21	61	.256
8	Philadelphia 76ers	9	73	.110

z – clinched division title
y – clinched division title
x – clinched playoff spot

=== Game log ===
1972–73 game log
#	Date	Opponent	Score	High points	Record
1	October 10	Seattle	89–113	Bill Bradley (26)	1–0
2	October 14	Los Angeles	100–125	Bill Bradley (29)	2–0
3	October 15	@ Atlanta	101–109	Bradley, DeBusschere (21)	2–1
4	October 17	Houston	95–103	Jerry Lucas (22)	3–1
5	October 20	@ Cleveland	92–89	Walt Frazier (33)	4–1
6	October 21	Philadelphia	88–111	Walt Frazier (21)	5–1
7	October 24	Cleveland	90–123	Walt Frazier (22)	6–1
8	October 27	@ Baltimore	92–88	Walt Frazier (25)	7–1
9	October 28	Baltimore	90–94	Earl Monroe (21)	8–1
10	November 1	@ Kansas City–Omaha	122–85	Walt Frazier (22)	9–1
11	November 3	@ Seattle	105–80	Bradley, Monroe (18)	10–1
12	November 4	@ Golden State	104–127	Bill Bradley (23)	10–2
13	November 6	@ Portland	111–95	Bill Bradley (24)	11–2
14	November 9	Atlanta	99–101	Walt Frazier (35)	12–2
15	November 10	@ Philadelphia	125–106	Dave DeBusschere (24)	13–2
16	November 11	Golden State	103–102 (OT)	Dave DeBusschere (27)	13–3
17	November 14	Phoenix	97–103	Walt Frazier (32)	14–3
18	November 16	Houston	100–119	Earl Monroe (24)	15–3
19	November 18	Milwaukee	86–87	Earl Monroe (22)	16–3
20	November 21	Portland	80–108	Dave DeBusschere (25)	17–3
21	November 24	@ Boston	97–114	Walt Frazier (25)	17–4
22	November 25	Boston	94–97	Walt Frazier (31)	18–4
23	November 28	Cleveland	84–107	Walt Frazier (19)	19–4
24	November 29	@ Philadelphia	139–91	Bill Bradley (26)	20–4
25	December 1	@ Milwaukee	74–100	Earl Monroe (17)	20–5
26	December 2	Buffalo	94–119	Earl Monroe (24)	21–5
27	December 5	Kansas City–Omaha	103–125	Dave DeBusschere (28)	22–5
28	December 8	@ Buffalo	89–91	Walt Frazier (26)	22–6
29	December 9	Philadelphia	109–120	Bradley, Frazier (26)	23–6
30	December 12	Atlanta	93–114	Walt Frazier (29)	24–6
31	December 13	@ Atlanta	120–121	Dave DeBusschere (21)	24–7
32	December 15	@ Chicago	86–90	Walt Frazier (20)	24–8
33	December 16	Chicago	83–97	Dave DeBusschere (27)	25–8
34	December 19	@ Phoenix	84–117	Earl Monroe (17)	25–9
35	December 20	N Houston	124–102	DeBusschere, Reed (26)	26–9
36	December 22	@ Cleveland	98–87	Dave DeBusschere (24)	27–9
37	December 25	Detroit	110–113	Bill Bradley (29)	28–9
38	December 26	@ Boston	106–115	Walt Frazier (29)	28–10
39	December 28	Buffalo	86–107	Walt Frazier (19)	29–10
40	December 29	@ Detroit	99–94	Walt Frazier (24)	30–10
41	December 30	Baltimore	98–100	Earl Monroe (26)	31–10
42	January 2	Milwaukee	92–102	Bill Bradley (22)	32–10
43	January 5	@ Buffalo	129–106	Bill Bradley (38)	33–10
44	January 6	Houston	106–116	Walt Frazier (33)	34–10
45	January 9	@ Kansas City–Omaha	116–115 (OT)	DeBusschere, Monroe (24)	35–10
46	January 11	@ Atlanta	122–107	Walt Frazier (31)	36–10
47	January 12	@ Houston	104–103	Earl Monroe (25)	37–10
48	January 14	@ Seattle	86–84	Willis Reed (22)	38–10
49	January 16	@ Phoenix	102–101	Dave DeBusschere (30)	39–10
50	January 19	@ Los Angeles	88–95	Walt Frazier (24)	39–11
51	January 21	@ Houston	103–107	Walt Frazier (24)	39–12
52	January 25	Buffalo	92–99	Walt Frazier (23)	40–12
53	January 27	Boston	108–111	Walt Frazier (25)	41–12
54	January 28	@ Boston	96–93	Walt Frazier (23)	42–12
55	January 29	Golden State	84–97	DeBusschere, Frazier (27)	43–12
56	January 31	@ Detroit	91–94	Walt Frazier (20)	43–13
57	February 2	@ Baltimore	77–89	Dave DeBusschere (22)	43–14
58	February 3	Cleveland	90–95	Dave DeBusschere (21)	44–14
59	February 4	@ Cleveland	114–97	Walt Frazier (28)	45–14
60	February 6	Los Angeles	95–90	Phil Jackson (15)	45–15
61	February 10	Detroit	93–107	Earl Monroe (22)	46–15
62	February 14	Chicago	100–98	Walt Frazier (29)	46–16
63	February 16	@ Buffalo	102–98	Walt Frazier (34)	47–16
64	February 17	Philadelphia	89–107	Earl Monroe (25)	48–16
65	February 18	@ Philadelphia	98–114	Walt Frazier (25)	48–17
66	February 20	Portland	106–110	Jerry Lucas (27)	49–17
67	February 23	@ Chicago	83–84	Jerry Lucas (22)	49–18
68	February 24	Buffalo	97–125	Walt Frazier (25)	50–18
69	February 27	Boston	91–123	Frazier, Jackson (20)	51–18
70	March 1	@ Milwaukee	100–114	Phil Jackson (22)	51–19
71	March 3	Baltimore	97–75	Walt Frazier (22)	51–20
72	March 4	N Baltimore	97–106	Walt Frazier (26)	51–21
73	March 6	Seattle	94–106	Bill Bradley (29)	52–21
74	March 7	@ Philadelphia	120–94	Walt Frazier (28)	53–21
75	March 10	Kansas City–Omaha	102–125	Bradley, Frazier (28)	54–21
76	March 11	@ Boston	107–122	Walt Frazier (22)	54–22
77	March 13	Phoenix	111–115	Frazier, Reed (28)	55–22
78	March 16	@ Los Angeles	109–98	Earl Monroe (23)	56–22
79	March 17	@ Golden State	117–108	Earl Monroe (21)	57–22
80	March 18	@ Portland	96–99	Earl Monroe (18)	57–23
81	March 21	Atlanta	98–93	Jackson, Monroe (18)	57–24
82	March 24	Boston	108–103	Earl Monroe (25)	57–25

== Playoffs ==
1973 playoff game log
Conference Semifinals: 4–1 (home: 3–0; road: 1–1)

Game	Date	Team	Score	High points	High rebounds	High assists	Location Attendance	Series
1	March 30	Baltimore	W 95–83	Walt Frazier (25)	Frazier, DeBusschere (7)	Walt Frazier (6)	Madison Square Garden; 19,694	1–0
2	April 1	Baltimore	W 123–103	Walt Frazier (29)	Dave DeBusschere (11)	Walt Frazier (13)	Madison Square Garden; 19,694	2–0
3	April 4	@ Baltimore	W 103–96	Bill Bradley (23)	Dave DeBusschere (11)	Walt Frazier (7)	Baltimore Civic Center; 12,289	3–0
4	April 6	@ Baltimore	L 89–97	Walt Frazier (17)	Willis Reed (8)	DeBusschere, Monroe (4)	Baltimore Civic Center; 12,289	3–1
5	April 8	Baltimore	W 109–99	Earl Monroe (26)	Dave DeBusschere (15)	Walt Frazier (7)	Madison Square Garden; 19,694	4–1

Conference Finals: 4–3 (home: 2–1; road: 2–2)

Game	Date	Team	Score	High points	High rebounds	High assists	Location Attendance	Series
1	April 15	@ Boston	L 108–134	Walt Frazier (24)	Walt Frazier (7)	Walt Frazier (10)	Boston Garden; 15,320	0–1
2	April 18	Boston	W 129–96	Walt Frazier (24)	Dave DeBusschere (8)	Walt Frazier (10)	Madison Square Garden; 19,694	1–1
3	April 20	@ Boston	W 98–91	Walt Frazier (23)	DeBusschere, Reed (11)	Walt Frazier (5)	Boston Garden; 15,320	2–1
4	April 22	Boston	W 117–110 (2OT)	Walt Frazier (37)	Dave DeBusschere (10)	Dean Meminger (7)	Madison Square Garden; 19,694	3–1
5	April 25	@ Boston	L 97–98	Walt Frazier (21)	Dave DeBusschere (12)	Frazier, DeBusschere (5)	Boston Garden; 15,320	3–2
6	April 27	Boston	L 100–110	Walt Frazier (29)	Dave DeBusschere (17)	Bradley, DeBusschere (5)	Madison Square Garden; 19,694	3–3
7	April 29	@ Boston	W 94–78	Walt Frazier (25)	Walt Frazier (10)	Dave DeBusschere (8)	Boston Garden; 15,320	4–3

NBA Finals: 4–1 (home: 2–0; road: 2–1)

Game	Date	Team	Score	High points	High rebounds	High assists	Location Attendance	Series
1	May 1	@ Los Angeles	L 112–115	Dave DeBusschere (25)	Dave DeBusschere (16)	Walt Frazier (8)	The Forum; 17,505	0–1
2	May 3	@ Los Angeles	W 99–95	Bill Bradley (26)	DeBusschere, Reed (9)	Bill Bradley (4)	The Forum; 17,505	1–1
3	May 6	Los Angeles	W 87–83	Willis Reed (22)	Dave DeBusschere (11)	Earl Monroe (6)	Madison Square Garden; 19,694	2–1
4	May 8	Los Angeles	W 103–98	Dave DeBusschere (33)	Dave DeBusschere (14)	Walt Frazier (8)	Madison Square Garden; 19,694	3–1
5	May 10	@ Los Angeles	W 102–93	Earl Monroe (23)	Willis Reed (12)	Frazier, Bradley (5)	The Forum; 17,505	4–1

1973 schedule

== Player statistics ==
Legend
GP	Games played	GS	Games started	MPG	Minutes per game
FG%	Field-goal percentage	3P%	3-point field-goal percentage	FT%	Free-throw percentage
RPG	Rebounds per game	APG	Assists per game	SPG	Steals per game
BPG	Blocks per game	PPG	Points per game

=== Season ===
Player	Games played	Games started	Minutes played	Field goals	Free throws	Rebounds	Assists	Points
Walt Frazier	78		3181	681	286	570	461	1648
Bill Bradley	82		2998	575	169	301	367	1319
Dave DeBusschere	77		2827	532	194	787	259	1258
Earl Monroe	75		2370	496	172	245	288	1163
Willis Reed	69		1876	334	92	590	126	760
Jerry Lucas	71		2001	312	81	510	317	704
Phil Jackson	80		1393	245	154	344	94	644
Dean Meminger	80		1453	192	81	229	133	457
Henry Bibby	55		475	78	73	82	64	229
Dick Barnett	51		514	88	16	41	50	192
John Gianelli	52		516	79	23	150	25	181
Tom Riker	14		66	10	15	16	2	35
Harthorne Wingo	13		59	9	2	16	1	20
Luther Rackley	1		2	0	0	1	0	0
Knicks	82		19730 240.6	3627 44.2	1356 16.5	3882 47.3	2187 26.7	8610 105.0
Opponents	82		19730 240.6	3291 40.1	1471 17.9	4100 50.0	1714 20.9	8053 98.2

New York Knicks statistics
Player	GP	GS	MPG	FG%	3P%	FT%	RPG	APG	SPG	BPG	PPG
Dick Barnett	51		10.1	1.7		0.3	0.8	1.0			3.8
Henry Bibby	55		8.6	1.4		1.3	1.5	1.2			4.2
Bill Bradley	82		36.6	7.0		2.1	3.7	4.5			16.1
Dave DeBusschere	77		36.7	6.9		2.5	10.2	3.4			16.3
Walt Frazier	78		40.8	8.7		3.7	7.3	5.9			21.1
John Gianelli	52		9.9	1.5		0.4	2.9	0.5			3.5
Phil Jackson	80		17.4	3.1		1.9	4.3	1.2			8.1
Jerry Lucas	71		28.2	4.4		1.1	7.2	4.5			9.9
Dean Meminger	80		18.2	2.4		1.0	2.9	1.7			5.7
Earl Monroe	75		31.6	6.6		2.3	3.3	3.8			15.5
Luther Rackley	1		2.0	0.0		0.0	1.0	0.0			0.0
Willis Reed	69		27.2	4.8		1.3	1.5	1.2			11.0
Tom Riker	14		4.6	0.7		1.1	1.1	0.1			2.5
Harthorne Wingo	13		4.5	0.7		0.2	1.2	0.1			1.5
New York Knicks	82		240.6	44.2		16.5	47.3	26.7			105.0

=== Opponents ===
==== Vs. Atlanta ====
Regular-season series
New York tied 3–3 in the regular-season series

October 15, 1972

Recap

New York Knicks 101, Atlanta Hawks 109

The Omni, Atlanta

November 9, 1972

Recap

Atlanta Hawks 99, New York Knicks 101

Madison Square Garden, New York City

December 12, 1972

Recap

Atlanta Hawks 93, New York Knicks 114

Madison Square Garden, New York City

December 13, 1972

Recap

New York Knicks 120, Atlanta Hawks 121

The Omni, Atlanta

January 11, 1973

Recap

New York Knicks 122, Atlanta Hawks 107

The Omni, Atlanta

March 21, 1973

Recap

Atlanta Hawks 98, New York Knicks 93

Madison Square Garden, New York City

Team	Games played	Minutes played	Field goals	Free throws	Rebounds	Assists	Points
Knicks	6	288	275	101			651
Hawks	6	288	256	115			627

==== Vs. Baltimore ====
Regular-season series
New York tied 3–3 in the regular-season series

Team	Games played	Minutes played	Field goals	Free throws	Rebounds	Assists	Points
Knicks	6	288	239	57			535
Bullets	6	288	242	84			568

==== Vs. Boston ====
Regular-season series
New York tied 4–4 in the regular-season series

Team	Games played	Minutes played	Field goals	Free throws	Rebounds	Assists	Points
Knicks	8	384	340	160			840
Celtics	8	384	336	173			845

==== Vs. Buffalo ====
Regular-season series
New York won 6–1 in the regular-season series

December 2, 1972

Recap

Buffalo Braves 94, New York Knicks 119

Madison Square Garden, New York City

December 8, 1972

Recap

New York Knicks 89, Buffalo Braves 91

Buffalo Memorial Auditorium, Buffalo, New York

December 28, 1972

Recap

Buffalo Braves 86, New York Knicks 107

Madison Square Garden, New York City

January 5, 1973

Recap

New York Knicks 129, Buffalo Braves 106

Buffalo Memorial Auditorium, Buffalo, New York

January 25, 1973

Recap

Buffalo Braves 92, New York Knicks 99

Madison Square Garden, New York City

February 16, 1973

Recap

New York Knicks 102, Buffalo Braves 98

Buffalo Memorial Auditorium, Buffalo, New York

February 24, 1973

Recap

Buffalo Braves 97, New York Knicks 125

Madison Square Garden, New York City

Team	Games played	Minutes played	Field goals	Free throws	Rebounds	Assists	Points
Knicks	7	336	322	126			770
Braves	7	336	282	100			664

==== Vs. Chicago ====
Regular-season series
New York lost 1–3 in the regular-season series

Team	Games played	Minutes played	Field goals	Free throws	Rebounds	Assists	Points
Knicks	4	192	153	58			364
Bulls	4	192	134	89			357

==== Vs. Cleveland ====
Regular-season series
New York won 6–0 in the regular-season series

October 20, 1972

Recap

New York Knicks 92, Cleveland Cavaliers 89

Cleveland Arena, Cleveland, Ohio

October 24, 1972

Recap

Cleveland Cavaliers 89, New York Knicks 92

Madison Square Garden, New York City

November 28, 1972

Recap

Cleveland Cavaliers 84, New York Knicks 107

Madison Square Garden, New York City

December 22, 1972

Recap

New York Knicks 98, Cleveland Cavaliers 87

Cleveland Arena, Cleveland, Ohio

February 3, 1973

Recap

Cleveland Cavaliers 90, New York Knicks 95

Madison Square Garden, New York City

February 4, 1973

Recap

New York Knicks 114, Cleveland Cavaliers 97

Cleveland Arena, Cleveland, Ohio

Team	Games played	Minutes played	Field goals	Free throws	Rebounds	Assists	Points
Knicks	6	288	250	98			598
Cavaliers	6	288	220	96			536

==== Vs. Detroit ====
Regular-season series
New York won 3–1 in the regular-season series

December 25, 1972

Recap

Detroit Pistons 110, New York Knicks 113

Madison Square Garden, New York City

December 29, 1972

Recap

New York Knicks 99, Detroit Pistons 94

Cobo Center, Detroit, Michigan

January 31, 1973

Recap

New York Knicks 91, Detroit Pistons 94

Cobo Center, Detroit, Michigan

February 10, 1973

Recap

Detroit Pistons 93, New York Knicks 107

Madison Square Garden, New York City

Team	Games played	Minutes played	Field goals	Free throws	Rebounds	Assists	Points
Knicks	4	192	178	54			410
Pistons	4	192	164	63			391

==== Vs. Golden State ====
Regular-season series
New York tied 2–2 in the regular-season series

Team	Games played	Minutes played	Field goals	Free throws	Rebounds	Assists	Points
Knicks	4	197	176	68			420
Warriors	4	197	165	92			422

==== Vs. Houston ====
Regular-season series
New York won 5–1 in the regular-season series

Team	Games played	Minutes played	Field goals	Free throws	Rebounds	Assists	Points
Knicks	6						
Rockets	6						

==== Vs. Kansas City-Omaha ====
Regular-season series
New York won 4–0 in the regular-season series

Team	Games played	Minutes played	Field goals	Free throws	Rebounds	Assists	Points
Knicks	4						
Kings	4						

==== Vs. Los Angeles ====
Regular-season series
New York tied 2–2 in the regular-season series

Team	Games played	Minutes played	Field goals	Free throws	Rebounds	Assists	Points
Knicks	4						
Lakers	4						

==== Vs. Milwaukee ====
Regular-season series
New York tied 2–2 in the regular-season series

Team	Games played	Minutes played	Field goals	Free throws	Rebounds	Assists	Points
Knicks	4						
Bucks	4						

==== Vs. Philadelphia ====
Regular-season series
New York won 6–1 in the regular-season series

October 21, 1972

Recap

Philadelphia 76ers 88, New York Knicks 111

Madison Square Garden, New York City

November 10, 1972

Recap

New York Knicks 125, Philadelphia 76ers 106

Spectrum, Philadelphia

November 29, 1972

Recap

New York Knicks 139, Philadelphia 76ers 91

Spectrum, Philadelphia

December 9, 1972

Recap

Philadelphia 76ers 109, New York Knicks 120

Madison Square Garden, New York City

February 17, 1973

Recap

Philadelphia 76ers 89, New York Knicks 107

Madison Square Garden, New York City

February 18, 1973

Recap

New York Knicks 98, Philadelphia 76ers 114

Spectrum, Philadelphia

March 7, 1973

Recap

New York Knicks 120, Philadelphia 76ers 94

Spectrum, Philadelphia

Team	Games played	Minutes played	Field goals	Free throws	Rebounds	Assists	Points
Knicks	7	336	348	124			820
76ers	7	336	285	121			691

==== Vs. Phoenix ====
Regular-season series
New York won 3–1 in the regular-season series

Team	Games played	Minutes played	Field goals	Free throws	Rebounds	Assists	Points
Knicks	4						
Suns	4						

==== Vs. Portland ====
Regular-season series
New York won 3–1 in the regular-season series

Team	Games played	Minutes played	Field goals	Free throws	Rebounds	Assists	Points
Knicks	4						
Trail Blazers	4						

==== Vs. Seattle ====
Regular-season series
New York won 4–0 in the regular-season series

October 10, 1972

Recap

Seattle SuperSonics 89, New York Knicks 113

Madison Square Garden, New York City

November 3, 1972

Recap

New York Knicks 105, Seattle SuperSonics 80

Seattle Center Coliseum, Seattle

January 14, 1973

Recap

New York Knicks 86, Seattle SuperSonics 84

Seattle Center Coliseum, Seattle

March 6, 1973

Recap

Seattle SuperSonics 94, New York Knicks 106

Madison Square Garden, New York City

Team	Games played	Minutes played	Field goals	Free throws	Rebounds	Assists	Points
Knicks	4	192					410
SuperSonics	4	192					347

Opponent	Games played	Minutes played	Field goals	Free throws	Rebounds	Assists	Points Against
Atlanta	6						
Baltimore	6						
Boston	8						
Buffalo	7						
Chicago	4						
Cleveland	6						
Detroit	4						
Golden State	4						
Houston	6						
Kansas City-Omaha	4						
Los Angeles	4						
Milwaukee	4						
Philadelphia	7						
Phoenix	4						
Portland	4						
Seattle	4						
Opponents	82						

=== Playoffs ===
Player	Games played	Games started	Minutes played	Field goals	Free throws	Rebounds	Assists	Points
Walt Frazier	17		765	150	73	124	106	373
Dave DeBusschere	17		632	117	31	179	58	265
Earl Monroe	16		504	111	36	51	51	258
Bill Bradley	17		587	99	40	57	45	238
Willis Reed	17		486	97	18	129	30	212
Phil Jackson	17		338	60	28	72	24	148
Jerry Lucas	17		368	54	20	85	39	128
Dean Meminger	17		323	31	19	37	37	81
John Gianelli	7		55	11	3	13	1	25
Henry Bibby	6		43	8	4	2	3	20
Harthorne Wingo	3		12	5	1	7	0	11
Dick Barnett	4		17	3	0	0	2	6
Knicks	17		822 48.4	746 48.0	273 17.2	756 47.9	396 24.2	1765 113.2
Opponents	17							1679 98.3

New York Knicks statistics
Player	GP	GS	MPG	FG%	3P%	FT%	RPG	APG	SPG	BPG	PPG
Dick Barnett	4		4.3	0.8		0.0	0.0	5.5			1.5
Henry Bibby	6		7.2	1.3		0.7	0.3	0.5			3.3
Bill Bradley	17		34.5	5.8		2.4	3.4	2.6			14.0
Dave DeBusschere	17		37.2	6.9		2.3	10.5	3.4			15.6
Walt Frazier	17		45.0	8.8		4.3	7.3	6.2			21.9
John Gianelli	52		7.9	1.6		0.4	1.9	0.1			3.6
Phil Jackson	17		19.9	3.5		1.6	4.2	1.4			8.7
Jerry Lucas	17		21.6	3.2		1.2	5.0	2.3			7.5
Dean Meminger	17		19.0	1.8		1.1	2.2	2.2			4.8
Earl Monroe	16		31.5	6.9		2.3	3.2	3.2			16.1
Willis Reed	17		28.6	5.7		1.1	7.6	1.8			12.5
Harthorne Wingo	3		4.0	1.7		0.3	2.3	0.0			3.7
New York Knicks	17		48.4	48.0		17.2	47.9	24.2			113.2

=== Opponents ===
==== 1973 NBA Eastern Conference Semifinals vs. Baltimore ====
Regular-season series
New York won 4–1 in the 1973 NBA Eastern Conference Semifinals

Team	Games played	Minutes played	Field goals	Free throws	Rebounds	Assists	Points
Knicks	5	240	223	73			519
Bullets	5	240	204	70			478

==== 1973 NBA Eastern Conference Finals vs. Boston ====
Regular-season series
New York won 4–3 in the 1973 NBA Eastern Conference Finals

Team	Games played	Minutes played	Field goals	Free throws	Rebounds	Assists	Points
Knicks	7	346	308	127			743
Celtics	7	346	289	139			717

==== 1973 NBA Finals vs. Los Angeles ====
Regular-season series
New York won 4–1 in the 1973 NBA Finals

Team	Games played	Minutes played	Field goals	Free throws	Rebounds	Assists	Points
Knicks	5	240	215	73	232	117	503
Lakers	5	240	197	110	264	87	484

Opponent	Games played	Minutes played	Field goals	Free throws	Rebounds	Assists	Points Against
Baltimore	5						
Boston	7						
Los Angeles	5						
Opponents	17						

== Media ==
=== Local TV ===
Local TV	Play-by-Play	Color Commentator
WOR-TV 9	Bob Wolff	Cal Ramsey

Some New York Knicks TV Games never aired on WOR-TV because of broadcast conflict with the New York Rangers (NHL).

=== Local cable TV ===
Local cable TV	Play-by-Play	Color Commentator
Manhattan Cable Television	Bob Wolff	Cal Ramsey

=== Local radio ===
Flagship station	Play-by-Play	Color Commentator
WNBC–AM 660	Marv Albert	John Andariese

Some New York Knicks radio games never aired on WNBC–AM because of broadcast conflict with the New York Rangers (NHL).

== Awards and records ==
Player	Award
Willis Reed	NBA Finals Most Valuable Player Award
Walt Frazier	All-NBA Second Team
Walt Frazier	NBA All-Defensive First Team
Dave DeBusschere	NBA All-Defensive First Team

== 24th NBA All-Star Game ==
New York Knicks NBA All-Star representatives at the 1973 NBA All-Star Game in Chicago, Illinois at Chicago Stadium.

Player	Team	Position	Minutes	Points	Field goals	FGA	Free throws	FTA	Rebounds	Assists	Personal fouls
Bill Bradley	(Eastern Conference All-Stars)	F	12	4	2	5	0	0	1	0	2
Dave DeBusschere	(Eastern Conference All-Stars)	F, Starter	25	9	4	8	1	2	7	2	1
Walt Frazier	(Eastern Conference All-Stars)	G, Starter	26	10	5	15	0	0	6	2	1

== Transactions ==
Transactions listed are from July 1, 1972, to June 30, 1973.

=== Trades ===
October 9, 1972	To Atlanta Hawks; Eddie Mast for a 1973 2nd Round draft pick
