= 1974–75 New York Knicks season =

Season of National Basketball Association team the New York Knicks

- Head coach: Red Holzman
- General manager: Red Holzman
- Arena: Madison Square Garden

Results
- Record: 40–42 (.488)
- Place: Division: 3rd (Atlantic); Conference: 5th (Eastern)
- Playoff finish: East First Round (lost to Rockets 1–2)
- Stats at Basketball Reference

Local media
- Television: WOR-TV; Manhattan Cable Television
- Radio: WNEW

The 1974–75 New York Knicks season was the 29th season for the team in the National Basketball Association (NBA). In the regular season, the Knicks had a 40–42 win–loss record, finishing in third place in the Atlantic Division and qualifying for the NBA playoffs. New York lost to the Houston Rockets in the best-of-three first round of the playoffs, two games to one.

In the first round of the 1974 NBA draft, the Knicks did not select any players; their first pick was the 32nd overall choice in the second round, which they used to acquire Jesse Dark. The team alternated between wins and losses in their first eight games of the season, and were 6–6 before winning 11 of their next 13 games. They then lost six of the following seven contests, and by February 11 they fell below .500 for the season, at 27–28. New York remained with more losses than wins for the rest of the season, but still reached the postseason.

The Knicks were seeded fifth in the Eastern Conference and faced the fourth-seeded Rockets in the opening round of the playoffs. After a 15-point loss in Houston, the Knicks required a victory at home to extend their season, and defeated the Rockets 106–96 to force a decisive third game in the series. The Rockets won the final game, by a score of 118–86, to end New York's season.

== Draft picks ==
Note: This is not an extensive list; it only covers the first and second rounds, and any other players picked by the franchise that played at least one game in the league.

Round	Pick	Player	Position	Nationality	School/Club team
2	32	Jesse Dark	G	United States	VCU
5	86	Greg Jackson	G	United States	Guilford

== Roster ==
1974–75 New York Knicks roster
Players

Pos.	No.	Player	Height	Weight	DOB	From
SF	46	Dennis Bell	6 ft 5 in (1.96 m)	185 lb (84 kg)	1951-06-02	Drake
SF	24	Bill Bradley	6 ft 5 in (1.96 m)	205 lb (93 kg)	1943-07-28	Princeton
G	25	Jim Barnett	6 ft 4 in (1.93 m)	170 lb (77 kg)	1944-07-07	Oregon
SG	11	Jesse Dark	6 ft 5 in (1.96 m)	210 lb (95 kg)	1951-09-02	VCU
PF	31	Mel Davis	6 ft 6 in (1.98 m)	220 lb (100 kg)	1950-11-09	St. John's
PG	10	Walt Frazier	6 ft 4 in (1.93 m)	200 lb (91 kg)	1945-03-29	Southern Illinois
C	40	John Gianelli	6 ft 10 in (2.08 m)	220 lb (100 kg)	1950-06-10	Pacific
PF	18	Phil Jackson	6 ft 8 in (2.03 m)	220 lb (100 kg)	1945-09-17	North Dakota
G	15	Earl Monroe	6 ft 3 in (1.91 m)	185 lb (84 kg)	1944-11-21	Winston-Salem State
C	6	Tom Riker	6 ft 10 in (2.08 m)	225 lb (102 kg)	1950-02-28	South Carolina
C	41	Neal Walk	6 ft 10 in (2.08 m)	220 lb (100 kg)	1948-07-29	Florida
PF	43	Harthorne Wingo	6 ft 6 in (1.98 m)	210 lb (95 kg)	1947-09-09	Friendship College

Coaches
Head coach
- Red Holzman

Legend
- (DP) Unsigned draft pick
- (FA) Free agent
- (S) Suspended
- Injured

== Regular season ==
=== Season standings ===
Atlantic Division	W	L	PCT	GB	Home	Road	Div
y-Boston Celtics	60	22	.732	–	28–13	32–9	17–9
x-Buffalo Braves	49	33	.598	11	30–11	19–22	15–11
x-New York Knicks	40	42	.488	20	23–18	17–24	9–17
Philadelphia 76ers	34	48	.415	26	20–21	14–27	11–15

#	Eastern Conference				
#	Team	W	L	PCT	GB
1	z-Boston Celtics	60	22	.732	–
2	y-Washington Bullets	60	22	.732	–
3	x-Buffalo Braves	49	33	.598	11
4	x-Houston Rockets	41	41	.500	19
5	x-New York Knicks	40	42	.488	20
6	Cleveland Cavaliers	40	42	.488	20
7	Philadelphia 76ers	34	48	.415	26
8	Atlanta Hawks	31	51	.378	29
9	New Orleans Jazz	23	59	.280	37

Notes

- y – division champions
- x – clinched playoff spot

=== Season schedule ===
1974–75 game log
Total: 40–42 (home: 23–18; road: 17–24)
October: 4–3 (home: 4–1; road: 0–2)

Game	Date	Team	Score	High points	High rebounds	High assists	Location Attendance	Record
1	October 17	New Orleans	74–89	Earl Monroe (20)	John Gianelli (18)	Bill Bradley (8)	Madison Square Garden; 15,883	1–0
2	October 19	Philadelphia	99–86	Henry Bibby (20)	Bill Bradley (7)	Henry Bibby (5)	Madison Square Garden; 15,682	1–1
3	October 22	Houston	100–110	Bill Bradley (22)	Phil Jackson (7)	Walt Frazier (8)	Madison Square Garden; 14,555	2–1
4	October 24	@ Buffalo	91–111	Earl Monroe (18)	John Gianelli (8)	Walt Frazier (7)	Maple Leaf Gardens; 5,981	2–2
5	October 26	Boston	86–97	Walt Frazier (26)	Walt Frazier (10)	Frazier, Monroe (5)	Madison Square Garden; 19,694	3–2
6	October 30	@ Washington	86–94	Walt Frazier (24)	Phil Jackson (10)	Walt Frazier (2)	Capital Centre; 7,842	3–3
7	October 31	Atlanta	90–93	Earl Monroe (35)	John Gianelli (13)	Henry Bibby (8)	Madison Square Garden; 15,413	4–3

November: 9–5 (home: 4–3; road: 5–2)

Game	Date	Team	Score	High points	High rebounds	High assists	Location Attendance	Record
8	November 2	Chicago	95–90	Henry Bibby (27)	Harthorne Wingo (8)	Henry Bibby (6)	Madison Square Garden; 19,543	4–4
9	November 5	@ Houston	106–93	Bill Bradley (30)	Harthorne Wingo (13)	Henry Bibby (8)	Hofheinz Pavilion; 3,855	5–4
10	November 8	@ Los Angeles	117–105	Bill Bradley (32)	Frazier, Wingo (11)	Walt Frazier (10)	The Forum; 13,304	6–4
11	November 9	@ Golden State	93–97	Walt Frazier (23)	John Gianelli (12)	Bill Bradley (5)	Oakland-Alameda County Coliseum Arena; 9,556	6–5
12	November 12	@ Portland	103–105	Earl Monroe (33)	John Gianelli (12)	Walt Frazier (9)	Memorial Coliseum; 10,791	6–6
13	November 14	Cleveland	89–94	Earl Monroe (26)	John Gianelli (12)	Walt Frazier (6)	Madison Square Garden; 15,337	7–6
14	November 16	Seattle	94–104	Earl Monroe (30)	John Gianelli (15)	Bibby, Frazier (6)	Madison Square Garden; 18,932	8–6
15	November 19	Washington	85–86	Earl Monroe (22)	Walt Frazier (16)	Walt Frazier (6)	Madison Square Garden; 18,444	9–6
16	November 20	@ Philadelphia	105–95	Walt Frazier (30)	Howard Porter (15)	Walt Frazier (11)	The Spectrum; 8,101	10–6
17	November 21	@ Atlanta	101–95	Earl Monroe (28)	Harthorne Wingo (13)	Earl Monroe (4)	Omni Coliseum; 5,885	11–6
18	November 23	Milwaukee	90–72	Earl Monroe (17)	John Gianelli (9)	John Gianelli (4)	Madison Square Garden; 19,694	11–7
19	November 26	Detroit	99–88	Walt Frazier (27)	Harthorne Wingo (6)	Bradley, Frazier (3)	Madison Square Garden; 18,254	11–8
20	November 29	@ Boston	96–86	Earl Monroe (27)	Gianelli, Wingo (9)	Walt Frazier (7)	Boston Garden; 15,320	12–8
21	November 30	Buffalo	111–118	Walt Frazier (30)	Mel Davis (12)	Walt Frazier (7)	Madison Square Garden; 19,694	13–8

December: 6–7 (home: 4–4; road: 2–3)

Game	Date	Team	Score	High points	High rebounds	High assists	Location Attendance	Record
22	December 3	Los Angeles	95–100	Phil Jackson (22)	Harthorne Wingo (11)	Earl Monroe (7)	Madison Square Garden; 19,011	14–8
23	December 6	@ Philadelphia	96–88	Walt Frazier (26)	Walt Frazier (9)	Bradley, Frazier (4)	The Spectrum; 7,104	15–8
24	December 7	Portland	112–120	Walt Frazier (24)	Harthorne Wingo (9)	Walt Frazier (7)	Madison Square Garden; 19,694	16–8
25	December 10	Kansas City–Omaha	102–106	Walt Frazier (34)	Phil Jackson (9)	Walt Frazier (4)	Madison Square Garden; 16,366	17–8
26	December 13	@ Buffalo	104–108	Walt Frazier (22)	Mel Davis (16)	Walt Frazier (8)	Buffalo Memorial Auditorium; 12,774	17–9
27	December 14	Buffalo	118–102	Walt Frazier (26)	Frazier, Jackson, Wingo (8)	Walt Frazier (6)	Madison Square Garden; 19,694	17–10
28	December 17	Golden State	126–108	Earl Monroe (28)	Phil Jackson (10)	Walt Frazier (9)	Madison Square Garden; 19,694	17–11
29	December 19	@ Kansas City–Omaha	117–113	Bradley, Frazier (27)	Harthorne Wingo (12)	Bill Bradley (6)	Kemper Arena; 6,622	18–11
30	December 21	Boston	109–91	Walt Frazier (25)	John Gianelli (11)	Bill Bradley (5)	Madison Square Garden; 19,694	18–12
31	December 25	Philadelphia	104–97	Earl Monroe (29)	Mel Davis (7)	Walt Frazier (7)	Madison Square Garden; 18,766	18–13
32	December 26	@ Detroit	83–84	Earl Monroe (24)	John Gianelli (12)	Walt Frazier (6)	Cobo Arena; 11,265	18–14
33	December 28	New Orleans	94–101	Phil Jackson (18)	Phil Jackson (10)	Bradley, Frazier, Gianelli (4)	Madison Square Garden; 18,555	19–14
34	December 29	@ Milwaukee	89–115	Harthorne Wingo (16)	Phil Jackson (11)	Earl Monroe (6)	MECCA Arena; 10,938	19–15

January: 7–8 (home: 3–2; road: 4–6)

Game	Date	Team	Score	High points	High rebounds	High assists	Location Attendance	Record
35	January 2	Phoenix	113–117 (OT)	Walt Frazier (32)	John Gianelli (13)	Earl Monroe (8)	Madison Square Garden; 16,570	20–15
36	January 4	Cleveland	102–103	Walt Frazier (24)	Frazier, Jackson, Monroe, Wingo (7)	Bradley, Frazier, Monroe (4)	Madison Square Garden; 19,694	21–15
37	January 7	@ Portland	92–106	Walt Frazier (23)	John Gianelli (13)	Walt Frazier (6)	Memorial Coliseum; 9,715	21–16
38	January 8	@ Seattle	113–102	Earl Monroe (38)	Phil Jackson (12)	Walt Frazier (8)	Seattle Center Coliseum; 13,203	22–16
39	January 9	@ Golden State	96–132	Henry Bibby (23)	John Gianelli (10)	Walt Frazier (6)	Oakland-Alameda County Coliseum Arena; 12,392	22–17
40	January 11	@ Phoenix	107–113	Walt Frazier (43)	John Gianelli (12)	Walt Frazier (5)	Arizona Veterans Memorial Coliseum; 7,592	22–18
41	January 17	@ Kansas City–Omaha	90–107	Earl Monroe (26)	Mel Davis (14)	Walt Frazier (6)	Kemper Arena; 10,022	22–19
42	January 18	@ Chicago	104–91	Frazier, Monroe (25)	Mel Davis (12)	Earl Monroe (6)	Chicago Stadium; 17,422	23–19
43	January 21	Chicago	97–94	Earl Monroe (26)	John Gianelli (10)	Frazier, Monroe (5)	Madison Square Garden; 19,694	23–20
44	January 23	@ Cleveland	100–89	Phil Jackson (29)	Phil Jackson (13)	Frazier, Gianelli, Jackson (3)	Richfield Coliseum; 9,251	24–20
45	January 24	@ Buffalo	99–105	Walt Frazier (20)	John Gianelli (14)	Walt Frazier (7)	Buffalo Memorial Auditorium; 18,194	24–21
46	January 25	Kansas City–Omaha	112–103	Walt Frazier (29)	Mel Davis (18)	Walt Frazier (7)	Madison Square Garden; 19,694	24–22
47	January 28	Atlanta	111–115	Walt Frazier (39)	Mel Davis (10)	Walt Frazier (10)	Madison Square Garden; 17,754	25–22
48	January 29	@ Philadelphia	92–98	Walt Frazier (29)	Mel Davis (15)	Walt Frazier (5)	The Spectrum; 9,082	25–23
49	January 30	@ Atlanta	117–115	Earl Monroe (30)	John Gianelli (10)	Walt Frazier (5)	Omni Coliseum; 7,395	26–23

February: 4–10 (home: 2–5; road: 2–5)

Game	Date	Team	Score	High points	High rebounds	High assists	Location Attendance	Record
50	February 1	Houston	95–93	Bill Bradley (23)	John Gianelli (10)	Walt Frazier (8)	Madison Square Garden; 18,284	26–24
51	February 2	@ New Orleans	114–118	Earl Monroe (25)	Phil Jackson (12)	Bradley, Frazier (5)	Loyola Field House; 6,419	26–25
52	February 4	Los Angeles	94–109	Frazier, Monroe (20)	Davis, Gianelli (9)	Walt Frazier (8)	Madison Square Garden; 18,112	27–25
53	February 8	Boston	128–102	Walt Frazier (27)	Davis, Gianelli (6)	Walt Frazier (8)	Madison Square Garden; 19,694	27–26
54	February 9	@ Boston	88–105	Jim Barnett (19)	John Gianelli (10)	Davis, Monroe (4)	Boston Garden; 15,320	27–27
55	February 11	@ Chicago	84–101	Phil Jackson (16)	John Gianelli (11)	Walt Frazier (8)	Chicago Stadium; 12,317	27–28
56	February 15	Washington	108–106 (OT)	Mel Davis (24)	Mel Davis (17)	Walt Frazier (9)	Madison Square Garden; 19,694	27–29
57	February 16	@ Washington	104–125	Jim Barnett (22)	John Gianelli (9)	Jim Barnett (5)	Capital Centre; 19,035	27–30
58	February 18	Golden State	98–99	Walt Frazier (34)	Walt Frazier (6)	Walt Frazier (8)	Madison Square Garden; 19,694	28–30
59	February 19	@ Detroit	109–94	Walt Frazier (35)	John Gianelli (12)	John Gianelli (6)	Cobo Arena; 8,056	29–30
60	February 22	Buffalo	92–85	Walt Frazier (24)	John Gianelli (13)	Walt Frazier (6)	Madison Square Garden; 8,832	29–31
61	February 25	Seattle	102–101	Walt Frazier (23)	Mel Davis (10)	Walt Frazier (9)	Madison Square Garden; 17,096	29–32
62	February 26	@ Boston	103–121	Earl Monroe (20)	Mel Davis (12)	Frazier, Monroe (4)	Boston Garden; 13,169	29–33
63	February 28	@ Buffalo	114–106	Walt Frazier (28)	Frazier, Wingo (7)	Walt Frazier (6)	Buffalo Memorial Auditorium; 15,519	30–33

March: 8–7 (home: 4–3; road: 4–4)

Game	Date	Team	Score	High points	High rebounds	High assists	Location Attendance	Record
64	March 1	Philadelphia	100–94	Bill Bradley (22)	John Gianelli (13)	Earl Monroe (7)	Madison Square Garden; 19,465	30–34
65	March 2	@ Philadelphia	87–91	Walt Frazier (20)	Phil Jackson (10)	Walt Frazier (4)	The Spectrum; 9,823	30–35
66	March 4	Boston	126–111	Dennis Bell (20)	Harthorne Wingo (8)	Walt Frazier (7)	Madison Square Garden; 19,694	30–36
67	March 8	Detroit	100–118	Bill Bradley (32)	John Gianelli (15)	Walt Frazier (7)	Madison Square Garden; 19,694	31–36
68	March 11	Phoenix	98–103	Earl Monroe (31)	Walt Frazier (9)	Walt Frazier (8)	Madison Square Garden; 17,443	32–36
69	March 13	Portland	103–116	Earl Monroe (29)	John Gianelli (13)	Frazier, Gianelli, Monroe (5)	Madison Square Garden; 17,247	33–36
70	March 14	@ Houston	103–94	Earl Monroe (22)	John Gianelli (9)	Walt Frazier (8)	Hofheinz Pavilion; 9,471	34–36
71	March 16	@ Seattle	94–97	Earl Monroe (30)	Phil Jackson (13)	Earl Monroe (8)	Seattle Center Coliseum; 14,082	34–37
72	March 18	@ Los Angeles	109–100	Walt Frazier (27)	Walt Frazier (13)	Walt Frazier (11)	The Forum; 10,963	35–37
73	March 19	@ Phoenix	101–96	Earl Monroe (30)	Harthorne Wingo (16)	Walt Frazier (6)	Arizona Veterans Memorial Coliseum; 5,492	36–37
74	March 22	Boston	90–81	Walt Frazier (20)	John Gianelli (10)	Walt Frazier (6)	Madison Square Garden; 19,694	36–38
75	March 23	@ Boston	86–96	Earl Monroe (20)	Phil Jackson (16)	Bill Bradley (4)	Boston Garden; 12,656	36–39
76	March 26	@ Philadelphia	128–98	Earl Monroe (26)	Phil Jackson (14)	Walt Frazier (11)	The Spectrum; 6,730	37–39
77	March 28	@ New Orleans	102–111	Earl Monroe (28)	Phil Jackson (15)	Bradley, Monroe (4)	Municipal Auditorium; 8,002	37–40
78	March 30	Milwaukee	99–111	Earl Monroe (24)	Gianelli, Wingo (10)	Walt Frazier (14)	Madison Square Garden; 19,694	38–40

April: 2–2 (home: 2–0; road: 0–2)

Game	Date	Team	Score	High points	High rebounds	High assists	Location Attendance	Record
79	April 1	Philadelphia	95–99	Earl Monroe (26)	Harthorne Wingo (10)	Walt Frazier (7)	Madison Square Garden; 17,888	39–40
80	April 3	@ Cleveland	95–100	Earl Monroe (21)	Phil Jackson (13)	Walt Frazier (6)	Richfield Coliseum; 20,239	39–41
81	April 4	@ Milwaukee	101–109	Walt Frazier (25)	Phil Jackson (12)	Walt Frazier (7)	MECCA Arena; 10,938	39–42
82	April 6	Buffalo	93–105	Walt Frazier (26)	John Gianelli (11)	Walt Frazier (12)	Madison Square Garden; 19,694	40–42

Source: www.basketball-reference.com

== Playoffs ==
1975 playoff game log
First Round: 1–2 (home: 1–0; road: 0–2)

Game	Date	Team	Score	High points	High rebounds	High assists	Location Attendance	Series
1	April 8	@ Houston	W 99–84	Walt Frazier (21)	Phil Jackson (13)	Walt Frazier (11)	Hofheinz Pavilion; 10,218	0–1
2	April 10	Houston	L 96–106	Walt Frazier (26)	Phil Jackson (10)	Harthorne Wingo (7)	Madison Square Garden; 19,694	1–1
3	April 12	@ Houston	W 118–86	Walt Frazier (24)	Harthorne Wingo (10)	Walt Frazier (4)	Hofheinz Pavilion; 10,218	1–2

1975 schedule

== Awards and records ==
- Walt Frazier, All-NBA First Team
- Walt Frazier, NBA All-Defensive First Team
