= 1973 NBA Finals =

1973 basketball championship series

Team	Coach	Wins
New York Knicks	Red Holzman	4
Los Angeles Lakers	Bill Sharman	1
- Dates: May 1–10
- MVP: Willis Reed (New York Knicks)
- Hall of Famers: Knicks: Jerry Lucas (1980); Willis Reed (1982); Bill Bradley (1983); Dave DeBusschere (1983); Walt Frazier (1987); Earl Monroe (1990); Phil Jackson (2007, as a coach); Dick Barnett (2024); Lakers: Wilt Chamberlain (1979); Jerry West (1980); Gail Goodrich (1996); Pat Riley (2008, as a coach); Coaches: Red Holzman (1986); Bill Sharman (2004); Officials: Darell Garretson (2016); Mendy Rudolph (2007)
- Eastern finals: Knicks defeated Celtics, 4–3
- Western finals: Lakers defeated Warriors, 4–1

The 1973 NBA World Championship Series was the championship series of the 1972–73 National Basketball Association (NBA) season, and the culmination of that season's playoffs. The Eastern Conference champion New York Knicks defeated the Western Conference champion Los Angeles Lakers in five games to win their second championship. The series was an exact reversal of the prior year, this time with the Lakers winning Game 1 and the Knicks taking the next four games. Knicks center Willis Reed was named as the NBA Finals MVP.

The Knicks' next championship win would also be a Game 5 road win - 53 years, 1 month, 3 days later in 2026.

== Background ==
=== Los Angeles Lakers ===
The Los Angeles Lakers entered the 1973 NBA playoffs as co-favorites in the West with the Milwaukee Bucks, but both teams faced inspired opponents in the first round. The Chicago Bulls gave the Lakers all they could handle before the Lakers came from behind in Game 7 to take the series. The Lakers next faced the Golden State Warriors for the Western Conference championship (the Warriors had upset the Bucks in six games). In Game 1, the Lakers won by 2, and in Game 2 the Lakers won by 10. In Game 3 at Oakland, the Lakers routed the Warriors 126–70, but the Warriors won Game 4 to send the series back to Los Angeles. In the Forum, the Lakers took Game 5 and advanced to their fifth NBA Finals series in six seasons.

=== New York Knicks ===
One year after their NBA Finals loss, the Knicks were back in the playoffs. For some of the Knicks, including Jerry Lucas and Earl Monroe, this was probably their last shot at an NBA title. In the first round they paired against the Baltimore Bullets. The Knicks won games 1 and 2 in New York, but lost Game 3 at Baltimore (in that game, the Bullets used a strange lineup of two centers and three guards). New York would take Games 4 and 5 and Walt Frazier averaged 20 points per game in this series. In the Conference finals, the Knicks faced the 68–14 Boston Celtics, who not only had the league's best record but also, to that point, the third-best won-lost record in NBA history. The Celtics routed New York, 134–108, Game 1 at the Boston Garden, but the Knicks returned the favor with a 129–96 rout in Game 2 at Madison Square Garden. The Knicks then beat the Celtics in Game 3 in Boston, and took a 3–1 series lead with a double overtime Easter Sunday win back in New York. Boston came back with two critical wins, winning 98–97 in Boston on two Paul Silas free throws, then regaining the home-court advantage with a 110–100 win at New York in Game 6. For Game 7, however, the Celtics were without their star John Havlicek, who was nursing an elbow injury. In that Game 7, played in Boston, the Celtics unbeaten record in seventh games played in Boston Garden was snapped when New York won easily, 94–78.

=== Road to the Finals ===
Los Angeles Lakers (Western Conference champion)		New York Knicks (Eastern Conference champion)
# / Western Conference; # / Team / W / L / PCT; 1 / z-Milwaukee Bucks / 60 / 22 / .732; 2 / y-Los Angeles Lakers / 60 / 22 / .732; 3 / x-Chicago Bulls / 51 / 31 / .622; 4 / x-Golden State Warriors / 47 / 35 / .573; 5 / Detroit Pistons / 40 / 42 / .488; 6 / Phoenix Suns / 38 / 44 / .463; 7 / Kansas City–Omaha Kings / 36 / 46 / .439; 8 / Seattle SuperSonics / 26 / 56 / .317; 9 / Portland Trail Blazers / 21 / 61 / .256; 2nd seed in the West, 3rd best league record	Regular season	# / Eastern Conference; # / Team / W / L / PCT; 1 / z-Boston Celtics / 68 / 14 / .829; 2 / x-New York Knicks / 57 / 25 / .695; 3 / y-Baltimore Bullets / 52 / 30 / .634; 4 / x-Atlanta Hawks / 46 / 36 / .561; 5 / Houston Rockets / 33 / 49 / .402; 6 / Cleveland Cavaliers / 32 / 50 / .390; 7 / Buffalo Braves / 21 / 61 / .256; 8 / Philadelphia 76ers / 9 / 73 / .110; 2nd seed in the East, 4th best league record
Defeated the (3) Chicago Bulls, 4–3	Conference Semifinals	Defeated the (2) Baltimore Bullets, 4–1
Defeated the (4) Golden State Warriors, 4–1	Conference Finals	Defeated the (1) Boston Celtics, 4–3

== Series summary ==
After losing the first game, the Knicks reeled off four straight wins to reclaim the NBA title. The Knicks would not make it back to the NBA Finals until 1994 and would not win another NBA Championship until 2026.

This would also be the last Finals appearance of the decade for the Lakers. Their next appearance would be in 1980, which would be the first of nine Finals appearances in 12 years for the franchise.

Game	Date	Home team	Result	Road team
Game 1	May 1	Los Angeles Lakers	115–112 (1–0)	New York Knicks
Game 2	May 3	Los Angeles Lakers	95–99 (1–1)	New York Knicks
Game 3	May 6	New York Knicks	87–83 (2–1)	Los Angeles Lakers
Game 4	May 8	New York Knicks	103–98 (3–1)	Los Angeles Lakers
Game 5	May 10	Los Angeles Lakers	93–102 (1–4)	New York Knicks

Knicks win series 4-1

This was the only NBA Championship for Jerry Lucas and Earl Monroe.

Game 5 of the series was Wilt Chamberlain's last game played in the NBA. Chamberlain scored the last points of the game, and of his career, on an uncontested fast break dunk with one second remaining.

ABC televised its last NBA Finals, until 2003. This is, to date, the last time a New York/Los Angeles NBA Finals of any combination has taken place, as well as the fifth-to-last championship series contested by both cities in any sport (the 1981 World Series is the last matchup in the 20th century, and the 2024 World Series is the latest).

== Game summaries ==
=== Game 1 ===
ABC

May 1

Boxscore

New York Knicks 112, Los Angeles Lakers 115
Scoring by quarter: 26–29, 23–30, 30–36, 33–20
Pts: Dave DeBusschere 25; Rebs: Dave DeBusschere 16; Asts: Walt Frazier 8	Pts: Gail Goodrich 30; Rebs: Wilt Chamberlain 20; Asts: Wilt Chamberlain 6
Los Angeles leads series, 1–0

The Forum, Inglewood, California
Attendance: 17,505
Referees: Mendy Rudolph, Jack Madden

=== Game 2 ===
ABC

May 3

Boxscore

New York Knicks 99, Los Angeles Lakers 95
Scoring by quarter: 24–23, 26–23, 26–26, 23–23
Pts: Bill Bradley 26; Rebs: DeBusschere, Reed 9 each Asts: Jerry Lucas 5	Pts: Jerry West 32; Rebs: Wilt Chamberlain 20; Asts: Goodrich, West 5
Series tied, 1–1

The Forum, Inglewood, California
Attendance: 17,505
Referees: Jake O'Donnell, Ed Rush

=== Game 3 ===
ABC

May 6

Boxscore

Los Angeles Lakers 83, New York Knicks 87
Scoring by quarter: 24–26, 23–18, 13–25, 23–18
Pts: Jim McMillian 22; Rebs: Wilt Chamberlain 13; Asts: Wilt Chamberlain 5	Pts: Willis Reed 22; Rebs: Dave DeBusschere 11; Asts: Earl Monroe 6
New York leads series, 2–1

Madison Square Garden, New York City, New York
Attendance: 19,694
Referees: Jack Madden, Don Murphy

=== Game 4 ===
ABC

May 8

Boxscore

Los Angeles Lakers 98, New York Knicks 103
Scoring by quarter: 16–29, 28–26, 25–27, 29–21
Pts: Goodrich, West 23; Rebs: Wilt Chamberlain 19; Asts: Bill Bridges 7	Pts: Dave DeBusschere 33; Rebs: Dave DeBusschere 14; Asts: Walt Frazier 8
New York leads series, 3–1

Madison Square Garden, New York City, New York
Attendance: 19,694
Referees: Mendy Rudolph, Darell Garretson

=== Game 5 ===
ABC

May 10

Boxscore

New York Knicks 102, Los Angeles Lakers 93
Scoring by quarter: 23–16, 16–25, 32–18, 31–34
Pts: Earl Monroe 23; Rebs: Willis Reed 12; Asts: Willis Reed 7	Pts: Gail Goodrich 28; Rebs: Wilt Chamberlain 21; Asts: Jerry West 4
New York wins NBA Finals, 4–1

The Forum, Inglewood, California
Attendance: 17,505
Referees: Don Murphy, Darell Garretson

== Team rosters ==
=== New York Knicks ===
1972–73 New York Knicks roster
Players

Pos.	No.	Player	Height	Weight	DOB	From
SG	12	Dick Barnett	6 ft 4 in (1.93 m)	190 lb (86 kg)	1936–10–02	Tennessee State
PG	17	Henry Bibby	6 ft 1 in (1.85 m)	185 lb (84 kg)	1949–11–24	UCLA
SF	24	Bill Bradley	6 ft 5 in (1.96 m)	205 lb (93 kg)	1943–07–28	Princeton
PF	22	Dave DeBusschere	6 ft 6 in (1.98 m)	220 lb (100 kg)	1940–10–16	Detroit Mercy
PG	10	Walt Frazier	6 ft 4 in (1.93 m)	200 lb (91 kg)	1945–03–29	Southern Illinois
C	40	John Gianelli	6 ft 10 in (2.08 m)	220 lb (100 kg)	1950–06–10	Pacific
PF	18	Phil Jackson	6 ft 8 in (2.03 m)	220 lb (100 kg)	1945–09–17	North Dakota
PF	32	Jerry Lucas	6 ft 8 in (2.03 m)	230 lb (104 kg)	1940–03–30	Ohio State
SG	7	Dean Meminger	6 ft 0 in (1.83 m)	175 lb (79 kg)	1948–05–13	Marquette
SG	15	Earl Monroe	6 ft 3 in (1.91 m)	185 lb (84 kg)	1944–11–21	Winston-Salem State
C	19	Willis Reed	6 ft 9 in (2.06 m)	235 lb (107 kg)	1942–06–25	Grambling State
C	6	Tom Riker	6 ft 10 in (2.08 m)	225 lb (102 kg)	1950–02–28	South Carolina
F	43	Harthorne Wingo	6 ft 6 in (1.98 m)	210 lb (95 kg)	1947–09–09	Friendship College

Coaches
Head coach
- Red Holzman
Assistant(s)
- Dick McGuire

Legend
- (DP) Unsigned draft pick
- (FA) Free agent
- (S) Suspended
- Injured

Roster
Updated: 1973–05–10

=== Los Angeles Lakers ===
1972–73 Los Angeles Lakers roster
Players

Pos.	No.	Player	Height	Weight	DOB	From
PF	32	Bill Bridges	6 ft 6 in (1.98 m)	228 lb (103 kg)	1939-04-04	Kansas
C	30	Roger Brown	6 ft 11 in (2.11 m)	225 lb (102 kg)	1950-02-23	Kansas
C	13	Wilt Chamberlain	7 ft 1 in (2.16 m)	275 lb (125 kg)	1936-08-21	Kansas
C	31	Mel Counts	7 ft 0 in (2.13 m)	230 lb (104 kg)	1941-10-16	Oregon State
C	14	Leroy Ellis	6 ft 10 in (2.08 m)	210 lb (95 kg)	1940-03-10	St. John's
SF	24	Keith Erickson	6 ft 5 in (1.96 m)	195 lb (88 kg)	1944-04-19	UCLA
SG	25	Gail Goodrich	6 ft 1 in (1.85 m)	170 lb (77 kg)	1943-04-23	UCLA
SF	33	Travis Grant	6 ft 7 in (2.01 m)	215 lb (98 kg)	1950-01-01	Kentucky State
PF	52	Happy Hairston	6 ft 7 in (2.01 m)	255 lb (116 kg)	1942-05-31	NYU
SF	5	Jim McMillian	6 ft 5 in (1.96 m)	225 lb (102 kg)	1948-03-11	Columbia
PG	15	Jim Price	6 ft 3 in (1.91 m)	195 lb (88 kg)	1949-11-27	Louisville
SG	12	Pat Riley	6 ft 4 in (1.93 m)	205 lb (93 kg)	1945-03-20	Kentucky
SG	21	Flynn Robinson	6 ft 1 in (1.85 m)	185 lb (84 kg)	1941-04-28	Wyoming
SF	31	John Trapp	6 ft 7 in (2.01 m)	210 lb (95 kg)	1945-10-02	UNLV
PF	30	Bill Turner	6 ft 7 in (2.01 m)	220 lb (100 kg)	1944-02-18	Akron
PG	44	Jerry West	6 ft 2 in (1.88 m)	175 lb (79 kg)	1938-05-28	West Virginia

Coaches
Head coach
- Bill Sharman

Legend
- (DP) Unsigned draft pick
- (FA) Free agent
- (S) Suspended
- Injured

Roster
Updated: 2013-03-22

== See also ==
- 1972–73 NBA season
- 1973 NBA playoffs
