= Carnesecca Arena =

Venue in New York City

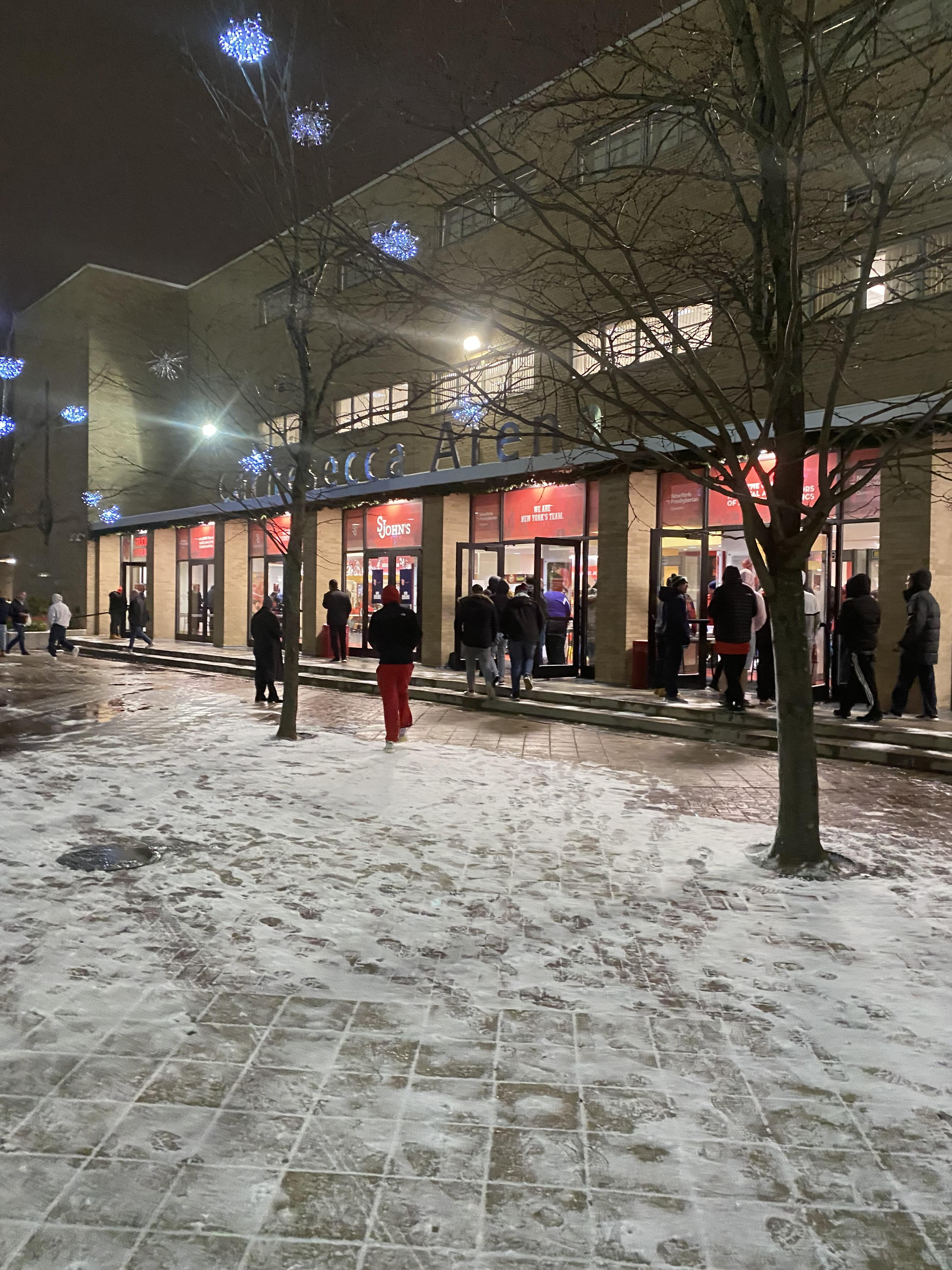
- Exterior of Carnesecca Arena
- Interactive map of Carnesecca Arena
- Former names: Alumni Hall (1961–2004)
- Location: Fresh Meadows, Queens, New York City, New York, United States
- Coordinates: 40°43′27″N 73°47′40″W
- Owner: St. John's University
- Operator: St. John's University
- Capacity: 5,260 (basketball)
- Public transit: Bus routes Q30, Q31, Q46, QM1, QM5, QM6, QM7, QM8, QM31, QM35, QM36

Construction
- Opened: December 4, 1961

Tenants
- St. John's Red Storm (basketball & volleyball)

Carnesecca Arena (formerly Alumni Hall) is a 5,260-seat multi-purpose arena in the borough of Queens in New York City, New York. It was built in 1961 and renamed in honor of Hall of Fame Coach Lou Carnesecca on November 23, 2004. It is the exclusive home to the St. John's University Red Storm women's basketball team and also hosts select Red Storm men's basketball games, primarily non-conference games as well as certain Big East Conference fixtures. The majority of the men's conference schedule as well as non-conference games expected to draw large crowds are played at Madison Square Garden. The building hosted first-round games of the NCAA men's basketball tournament from 1970 to 1974. Up until March 2014, it was the most recent New York City venue to host the tournament.

== Arena records ==
=== Year-By-Year Record ===
Sources: Statistics published by St. John's University as of the end of the 2025 season St. John's Men's Basketball Media Guide;
Year	Wins	Losses	Pct.
1961-62	10	0	1.000
1962-63	7	5	.583
1963-64	11	3	.786
1964-65	8	1	.889
1965-66	10	2	.833
1966-67	11	0	1.000
1967-68	9	4	.692
1968-69	10	1	.909
1969-70	12	0	1.000
1970-71	9	2	.818
1971-72	8	4	.667
1972-73	8	2	.800
1973-74	9	1	.900
1974-75	8	1	.889
1975-76	13	0	1.000
1976-77	12	2	.857
1977-78	10	1	.909
1978-79	11	5	.688
1979-80	13	2	.867
1980-81	12	2	.857
1981-82	9	2	.818
1982-83	10	1	.909
1983-84	11	2	.846
1984-85	10	0	1.000
1985-86	12	0	1.000
1986-87	10	1	.909
1987-88	7	3	.700
1988-89	11	2	.846
1989-90	12	1	.923
1990-91	8	0	1.000
1991-92	8	0	1.000
1992-93	7	0	1.000
1993-94	6	3	.667
1994-95	5	1	.833
1995-96	4	3	.571
1996-97	3	2	.600
1997-98	6	0	1.000
1998-99	11	0	1.000
1999-00	6	0	1.000
2000-01	5	1	.833
2001-02	7	0	1.000
2002-03	6	2	.750
2003-04	1	4	.200
2004-05	4	3	.571
2005-06	5	2	.714
2006-07	9	1	.900
2007-08	7	2	.778
2008-09	9	1	.900
2009-10	6	3	.667
2010-11	5	2	.714
2011-12	7	1	.875
2012-13	7	1	.875
2013-14	8	2	.800
2014-15	9	1	.900
2015-16	5	6	.454
2016-17	6	2	.778
2017-18	7	4	.636
2018-19	10	2	.833
2019-20	10	2	.833
2020-21	11	3	.786
2021-22	11	2	.846
2022-23	9	4	.692
2023-24	5	0	1.000
2024-25	9	0	1.000
Totals	535	110	.829

=== Team records ===
Record	Details
Most Points - 44	February 10, 2018, Shamorie Ponds vs. Marquette
Most Rebounds - 26	December 11, 1971, Mel Davis vs. Seton Hall
Most Team Points - 135	November 29, 1990, Defeated Central Connecticut
Most Points, Both Teams - 227	November 29, 1990 Defeated Central Connecticut 135-92
Longest Winning Streak - 30	1984-85 (10), 1985-86 (12), 1986-87 (8)
Most Wins vs. One Opponent – 28	vs. St. Francis (NY)
Most Points, Opposing Player - 41	Ernie DiGregorio, Providence, March 3, 1971
Most Rebounds, Opposing Player - 24	Paul Silas, Creighton, January 13, 1962 (OT)
Most Points, Opposing Team - 96	Boston College, December 20, 1972 (OT)
Most Points (Regulation), Opposing Team - 94	Providence, December 28, 2017
Most Losses vs. One Opponent – 10	Providence

== Gallery ==
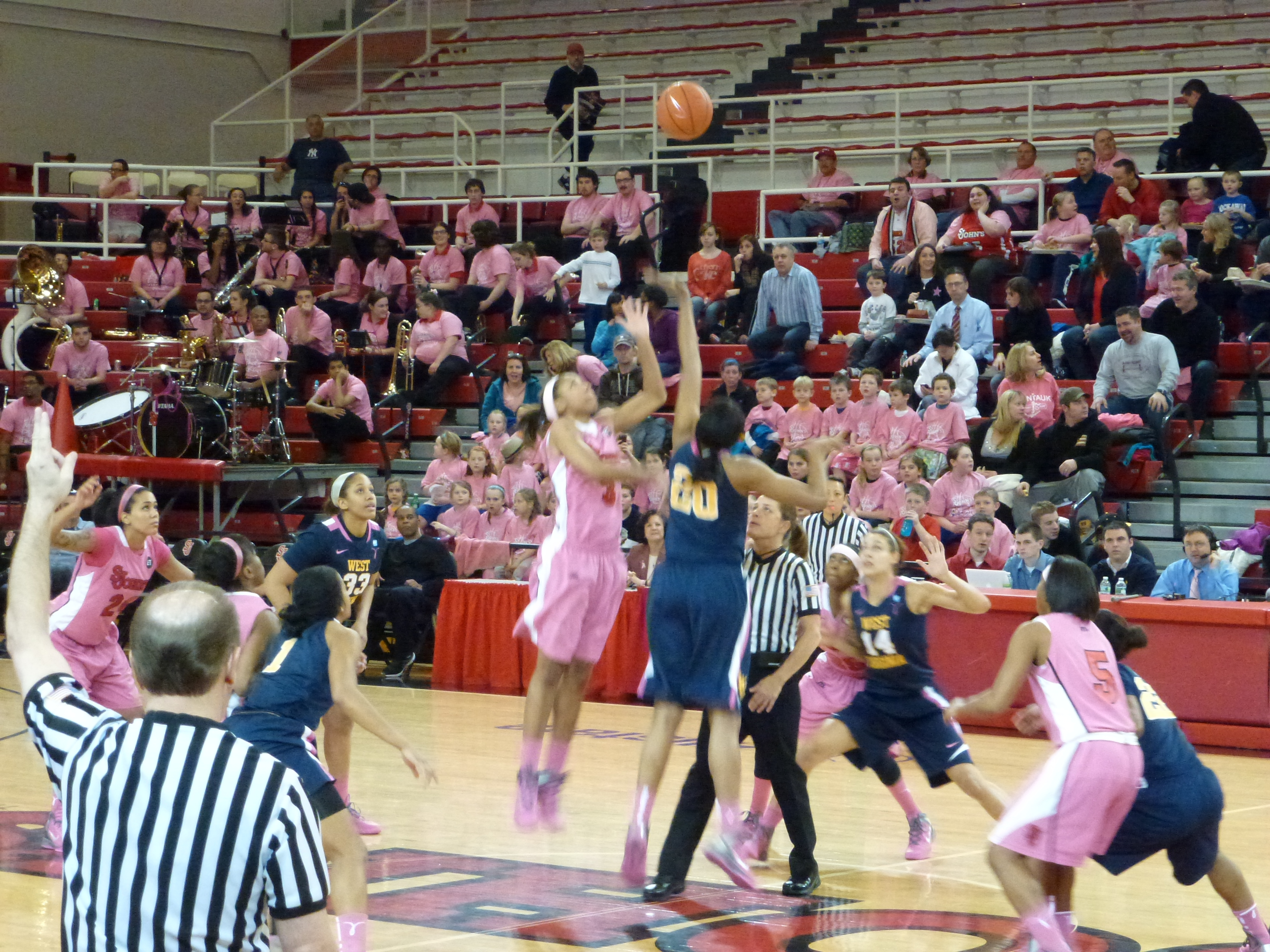
Game at Carnesecca Arena

== See also ==
- List of NCAA Division I basketball arenas
