= Gianello =

Gianello is an Italian surname. Notable people with the surname include:

- Dante Gianello (1912–1992), French cyclist
- Matteo Gianello (born 1976), Italian footballer

== See also ==
- Gianelli
- Gianello della Torre
