= Dennis Bell (basketball) =

American basketball player (born 1951)

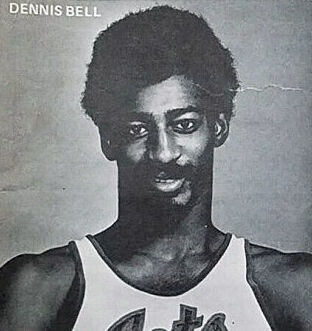
- Bell with the Allentown Jets in 1973

Personal information
- Born: June 2, 1951 (age 75) Cincinnati, Ohio, U.S.
- Listed height: 6 ft 5 in (1.96 m)
- Listed weight: 185 lb (84 kg)

Career information
- High school: Wyoming (Wyoming, Ohio)
- College: Gulf Coast State (1969–1971); Drake (1971–1973)
- NBA draft: 1973: 5th round, 83rd overall pick
- Drafted by: New York Knicks
- Playing career: 1973–1978
- Position: Small forward
- Number: 46

Career history
- 1973: New York Knicks
- 1973–1974: Allentown Jets
- 1974–1975: New York Knicks
- 1975–1977: Allentown Jets
- 1978: Carolina Lightning

Career highlights
- EBA champion (1976); All-EBA First Team (1974); EBA Rookie of the Year (1974)
- Stats at NBA.com
- Stats at Basketball Reference

Dennis R. Bell (born June 2, 1951) is an American former professional basketball player. Born in Cincinnati, Ohio, he played collegiately for Drake University. He was selected by the New York Knicks in the 5th round (83rd pick overall) of the 1973 NBA draft. He played for the Knicks (1973–76) in the NBA for 63 games.

Bell played for the Allentown Jets of the Eastern Basketball Association (EBA) during the 1973–74 season and from 1975 to 1978. He was selected as the EBA Rookie of the Year and a member of the All-EBA First Team in 1974.

Bell is the president of Recreational Debut, a non-profit housing organization he started in 1984. It is located in Grand Rapids, Michigan where it has assists low and moderate income families purchase homes. Recreational Debut has assisted families in Florida, Michigan, Arizona and Ohio. Recreational Debut is also helps high school student athletes obtain athletic scholarships to colleges around the United States. Bell received his BA from Drake University and his MBA from Grand Valley State.

== Career statistics ==
Legend
| GP | Games played | GS | Games started | MPG | Minutes per game |
| FG% | Field goal percentage | 3P% | 3-point field goal percentage | FT% | Free throw percentage |
| RPG | Rebounds per game | APG | Assists per game | SPG | Steals per game |
| BPG | Blocks per game | PPG | Points per game | **Bold** | Career high |

=== NBA ===
==== Regular season ====
| Year | Team | GP | GS | MPG | FG% | FT% | RPG | APG | SPG | BPG | PPG |
|---|---|---|---|---|---|---|---|---|---|---|---|
| 1973-74 | New York | 1 | 0 | 4.0 | .000 | – | .0 | .0 | .0 | .0 | .0 |
| 1974-75 | New York | **52** | 0 | **8.9** | .376 | **.556** | **2.0** | **.5** | .4 | **.2** | **3.0** |
| 1975-76 | New York | 10 | 0 | 7.6 | **.381** | .429 | 1.4 | .3 | **.6** | .1 | 1.9 |
| Career | | 63 | 0 | 8.7 | .374 | .535 | 1.9 | .4 | .4 | .2 | 2.8 |

==== Playoffs ====
| Year | Team | GP | MPG | FG% | FT% | RPG | APG | SPG | BPG | PPG |
|---|---|---|---|---|---|---|---|---|---|---|
| 1975 | New York | 3 | 9.0 | .125 | .000 | 1.3 | .0 | .0 | .0 | .7 |
