= Harthorne Wingo =

American basketball player (1947–2021)

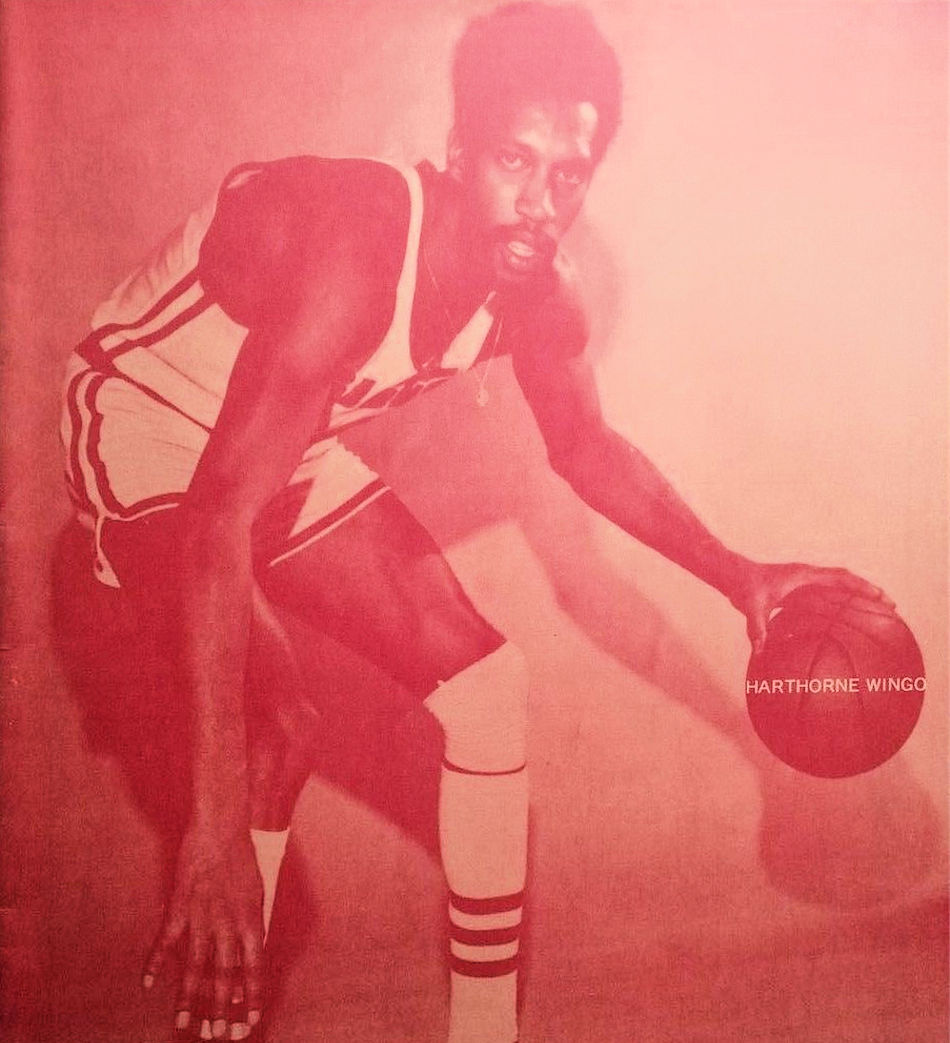
- Wingo with the Allentown Jets in 1971

Personal information
- Born: October 9, 1947 Tryon, North Carolina, U.S.
- Died: January 23, 2021 (aged 73) New York City, New York, U.S.
- Listed height: 6 ft 6 in (1.98 m)
- Listed weight: 210 lb (95 kg)

Career information
- High school: Edmund Embry (Tryon, North Carolina); Tryon (Tryon, North Carolina)
- College: Friendship JC (1965–1966)
- NBA draft: 1969: undrafted
- Playing career: 1968–1980
- Position: Power forward
- Number: 43

Career history
- 1968–1969: New Haven Elms
- 1970–1973: Allentown Jets
- 1973–1976: New York Knicks
- 1976–1978: Pallacanestro Cantu
- 1978–1980: Superga Mestre

Career highlights
- NBA champion (1973); 2× FIBA European Cup Winners' Cup (1977, 1978); EBA champion (1972); EBA Most Valuable Player (1972); All-EBA First Team (1972)
- Stats at NBA.com
- Stats at Basketball Reference

Harthorne Nathaniel Wingo (October 9, 1947 – January 23, 2021) was an American professional basketball player.

== Early life ==
Wingo was raised in Tryon, North Carolina, as one of 14 children. He was named after his father, Nathaniel Harthorne Wingo, who was named after the writer Nathaniel Hawthorne. His family's house was too small for all of the children so Wingo lived with his grandmother across the street while some of his other siblings lived with a neighbor. Wingo attended Edmund Embry High School for three years and then became one of the 15 black students who integrated Tryon High School during his senior year.

Wingo was recruited by Bones McKinney to play basketball for Wake Forest but his grades were not sufficient. He instead attended Friendship Junior College but did not receive any financial aid and only stayed for a year.

Wingo worked as a soft-drink cooler assembler while he played for a steel mill team based in Spartanburg, South Carolina. He was told about playground basketball in New York and decided to move there in 1968. Wingo lived with an aunt and worked a job pushing clothes racks. He played basketball in Greenwich Village near where he worked and developed his basketball skills.

== Professional career ==
Harthorne played for the New Haven Elms in the Eastern Professional Basketball League (EPBL) during the 1968–69 season. He played for the Allentown Jets from 1970 to 1973. He won an EBA championship with the Jets in 1972. Wingo was selected as the EBA Most Valuable Player and a member of the All-EBA First Team in 1972.

On February 2, 1973, Wingo was signed by the New York Knicks of the National Basketball Association (NBA). He played four seasons (1973–1976) in the NBA as a member of the Knicks. He averaged 4.8 points and 3.5 rebounds in his career and won a league championship in 1973.

After the 1975–76 season he moved to Italy and played with Pallacanestro Cantu (1976–1978), with whom he won the European Cup Winner's Cup twice, and Superga Mestre (1978–1980).

== Personal life and death ==
After his playing career ended, Wingo had financial trouble and developed a cocaine addiction. The National Basketball Retired Players Association (NBRPA) helped him overcome his addiction by paying for his rehabilitation. Wingo took out his entire pension from the NBRPA when he was aged 45 which he spent on buying a house for his family in North Carolina, a car and "having a good time." In 2004, Wingo lived in a one-bedroom apartment in Brooklyn. He had arthritis, high blood pressure, liver problems and neuropathy in his feet, and required a right hip replacement.

Wingo died in New York City in 2021 at the age of 73.

== Career statistics ==
Legend
GP	Games played	GS	Games started	MPG	Minutes per game
FG%	Field goal percentage	3P%	3-point field goal percentage	FT%	Free throw percentage
RPG	Rebounds per game	APG	Assists per game	SPG	Steals per game
BPG	Blocks per game	PPG	Points per game	**Bold**	Career high
†	Won an NBA championship

=== NBA ===
==== Regular season ====
Year	Team	GP	GS	MPG	FG%	FT%	RPG	APG	SPG	BPG	PPG
1972–73†	New York	13	0	4.5	.409	.333	1.2	.1			1.5
1973–74	New York	60	0	8.9	**.477**	.632	2.8	.4	.1	.2	3.5
1974–75	New York	**82**	**10**	**20.6**	.460	**.754**	**5.6**	**1.0**	**.6**	**.4**	**7.4**
1975–76	New York	57	0	9.4	.442	.667	1.9	.3	.3	.1	3.2
Career		212	10	13.3	.459	.702	3.5	.6	.4	.3	4.8

==== Playoffs ====
Year	Team	GP	MPG	FG%	FT%	RPG	APG	SPG	BPG	PPG
1973†	New York	3	4.0	.385	.500	2.3	.0			3.7
1974	New York	**5**	3.2	**.545**	–	.6	.2	.2	.0	2.4
1975	New York	3	**25.3**	.435	**.700**	**7.3**	**2.3**	**1.3**	.0	**9.0**
Career		11	9.5	.447	.667	2.9	.7	.6	.0	4.5
