= Henry Bibby =

American basketball player and coach

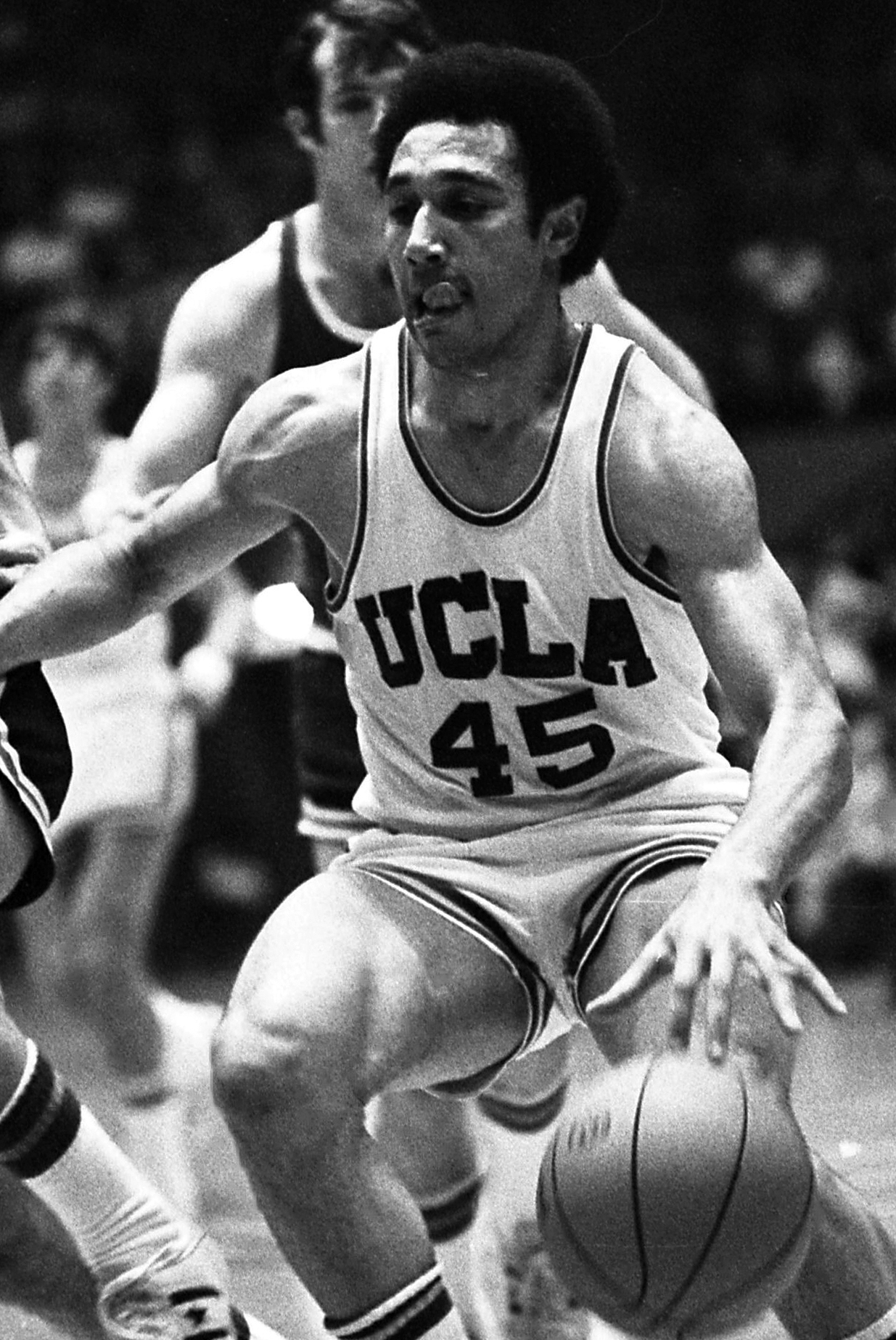
- Bibby with UCLA in 1972

Personal information
- Born: November 24, 1949 (age 76) Franklinton, North Carolina, U.S.
- Listed height: 6 ft 1 in (1.85 m)
- Listed weight: 185 lb (84 kg)

Career information
- High school: B.F. Person-Albion (Franklinton, North Carolina)
- College: UCLA (1969–1972)
- NBA draft: 1972: 4th round, 58th overall pick
- Drafted by: New York Knicks
- Playing career: 1972–1982
- Position: Point guard
- Number: 17, 45, 14, 15, 10
- Coaching career: 1981–2014, 2020

Career history

Playing
- 1972–1975: New York Knicks
- 1975–1976: New Orleans Jazz
- 1976–1980: Philadelphia 76ers
- 1980–1981: San Diego Clippers
- 1981–1982: Lancaster Lightning

Career highlights
- As player: NBA champion (1973); CBA champion (1982); 3× NCAA champion (1970–1972); Consensus first-team All-American (1972); Second-team All-Pac-8 (1972); As head coach: CBA champion (1989); USBL Coach of the Year (1986); As assistant coach: CBA champion (1982)

Career statistics
- Points: 5,775 (8.6 ppg)
- Rebounds: 1,581 (2.3 rpg)
- Assists: 2,259 (3.3 apg)
- Stats at NBA.com
- Stats at Basketball Reference

Charles Henry Bibby (born November 24, 1949) is an American former professional basketball player who played for the New York Knicks, New Orleans Jazz, Philadelphia 76ers, and San Diego Clippers of the National Basketball Association (NBA). He also spent a season as a player-assistant coach for the Lancaster Lightning of the Continental Basketball Association (CBA).

His brother, Jim Bibby, was a Major League Baseball pitcher, and his son, Mike Bibby, is a former NBA point guard.

== Playing career ==
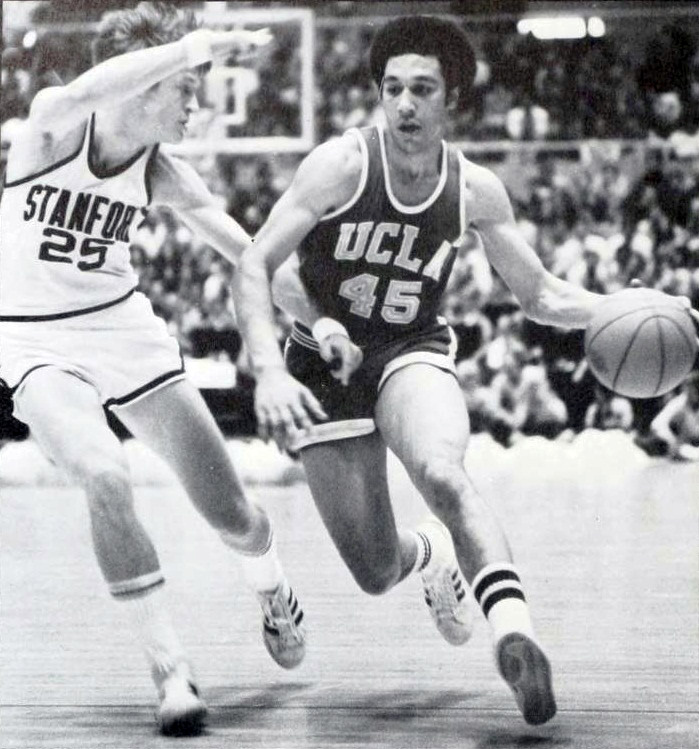
Bibby with UCLA circa 1971

In 1969, Bibby shared MVP honors on the UCLA freshman team with guard Andy Hill, as Bibby was the squad's leading scorer (26.8 ppg).

Bibby was a starting point guard as the UCLA Bruins won three straight national championships in 1970, 1971 and 1972, the Bruins' sixth consecutive under head coach John Wooden. Bibby helped lead the Bruins through the first 47 games of an 88-game winning streak and was named an All-American his senior year. He was one of only four players to have started on three NCAA championship teams; the others all played for Wooden at UCLA: Lew Alcindor, Curtis Rowe, and Lynn Shackelford.

In the 1972 NBA draft, Bibby was drafted in the fourth round by the New York Knicks and in the second round of the 1972 ABA Draft by the Carolina Cougars. Bibby opted to play for the Knicks and was with the team for two-and-a-half seasons, which included an NBA title in 1973.

Bibby spent nine seasons in the NBA, and was a part of the 1977 and 1980 Philadelphia 76ers teams that made the NBA Finals but lost both times.

Bibby won a CBA championship with the Lancaster Lightning in 1982.

== Coaching career ==
Bibby started his coaching career in the Continental Basketball Association (CBA) and won two championships in 1982 and 1989. He coached the Winnipeg Thunder in 1994.

In 1982, Bibby was reunited with former Philadelphia 76ers teammate Doug Collins when both joined the staff at Arizona State University (ASU) as assistant coaches.

In 1996, he was named coach of the men's basketball team at the University of Southern California (USC), and kept that position for nine seasons. Bibby had an overall won-loss record of 131–111 at USC. He led his 1997, 2001 and 2002 teams to the NCAA tournament, including an "Elite Eight" appearance in 2001. He was fired four games into his ninth season.

In April 2005, he was named head coach of the Los Angeles Sparks of the Women's National Basketball Association (WNBA). After 28 games, he was replaced by his assistant coach, Joe Bryant.

On January 17, 2006, Bibby was hired by the Philadelphia 76ers as an assistant coach on Maurice Cheeks' staff and remained there until the end of the 2007–2008 season, when his contract was not renewed. In February 2009 he was hired by the Memphis Grizzlies as an assistant coach. He remained with the team until 2013, when he joined the Detroit Pistons' coaching staff.

== Personal life ==
Bibby is the brother of Jim Bibby (1944–2010), a former Major League Baseball pitcher, and is the father of Mike Bibby, who played in the NBA. Bibby and his son are one of four father-son duos to each win an NCAA basketball championship. (Note: The others are Marques and Kris Johnson, Scott and Sean May, and Derek and Nolan Smith.) They were initially estranged after he divorced from his wife, leading Mike to publicly state "My father is not part of my life" after winning the NCAA title in 1997, but they later reconnected starting in 2002, the peak of Mike's NBA career.

== Career playing statistics ==
Legend
GP	Games played	GS	Games started	MPG	Minutes per game
FG%	Field goal percentage	3P%	3-point field goal percentage	FT%	Free throw percentage
RPG	Rebounds per game	APG	Assists per game	SPG	Steals per game
BPG	Blocks per game	PPG	Points per game	**Bold**	Career high
†	Won an NBA championship	*	Led the league

=== NBA ===
==== Regular season ====
Year	Team	GP	GS	MPG	FG%	3P%	FT%	RPG	APG	SPG	BPG	PPG
1972–73†	New York	55	0	8.6	.380		**.849**	1.5	1.2			4.2
1973–74	New York	66	1	14.9	**.452**		.830	2.0	1.4	1.0	.0	7.5
1974–75	New York	47	5	18.6	.448		.719	1.9	2.2	.6	**.1**	9.1
1974–75	New Orleans	28		18.7	.416		.731	1.8	2.7	.9	.0	8.9
1975–76	New Orleans	79		22.4	.428		.797	2.3	2.8	.8	.0	9.3
1976–77	Philadelphia	81	80	**32.6**	.430		.784	**3.4**	4.4	**1.3**	**.1**	10.2
1977–78	Philadelphia	**82**	**82**	30.7	.434		.781	3.1	**5.7**	1.1	**.1**	9.1
1978–79	Philadelphia	**82***	38	31.0	.423		.794	3.0	4.5	.9	**.1**	**12.2**
1979–80	Philadelphia	**82**	8	24.8	.401	.212	.790	2.5	3.7	.8	**.1**	9.0
1980–81	San Diego	73		15.2	.386	**.337**	.684	1.0	2.7	.6	.0	4.6
Career		675	214	22.9	.424	.293	.782	2.3	3.3	.9	.1	8.6

==== Playoffs ====
Year	Team	GP	MPG	FG%	3P%	FT%	RPG	APG	SPG	BPG	PPG
1973†	New York	6	7.2	**.444**		.500	.3	.5			3.3
1974	New York	10	8.9	.356		.833	1.0	1.1	.3	.0	4.2
1977	Philadelphia	**19***	**36.4**	.421		.763	**3.7**	3.9	**1.3**	**.1**	**11.1**
1978	Philadelphia	10	28.9	.402		**.909**	3.0	**4.8**	1.2	.0	8.6
1979	Philadelphia	9	25.7	.388		.667	2.1	4.7	.4	.0	8.0
1980	Philadelphia	18*	22.2	.363	.385	.800	2.4	2.9	.4	.0	7.5
Career		72	24.2	.396	.385	.768	2.4	3.2	.8	.0	7.9

== Head coaching record ==
=== Men's college basketball ===
Record table
Season	Team	Overall	Conference	Standing	Postseason
USC Trojans (Pacific-10 Conference) (1996–2004)
1995–96	USC	1–9	1–9	8th	
1996–97	USC	17–11	12–6	T–2nd	NCAA Division I First Round
1997–98	USC	9–19	5–13	8th	
1998–99	USC	15–13	7–11	T–7th	NIT First Round
1999–00	USC	16–14	9–9	6th	
2000–01	USC	24–10	11–7	T–4th	NCAA Division I Elite Eight
2001–02	USC	22–10	12–6	T–2nd	NCAA Division I First Round
2002–03	USC	13–17	6–12	T–6th	
2003–04	USC	13–15	8–10	6th	
2004–05	USC	2–2			
USC:		132–120 (.524)	71–83 (.461)		
Total:		132–120 (.524)			

=== WNBA ===
Team	Year	G	W	L	W–L%	Finish	PG	PW	PL	PW–L%	Result
Los Angeles	2005	28	13	15	.464	(left mid-season)	—	—	—	—	—
Career		28	13	15	.464		—	—	—	—	

== See also ==
- List of NBA single-game steals leaders
