= Tom Riker =

American basketball player

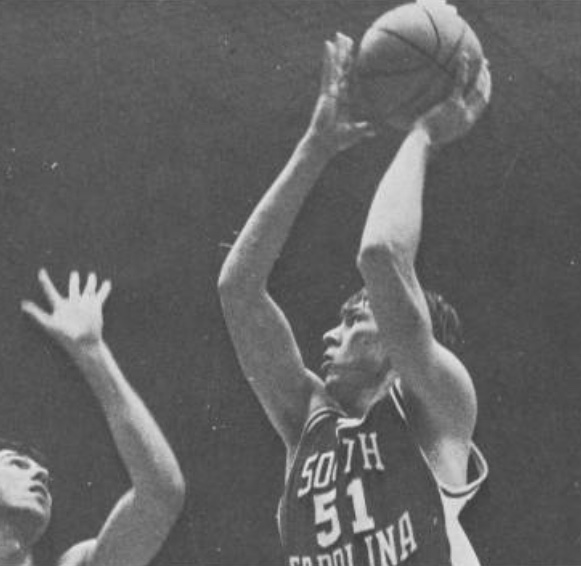
- Riker as a sophomore at South Carolina

Personal information
- Born: February 28, 1950 (age 76) Rockville Centre, New York, U.S.
- Listed height: 6 ft 10 in (2.08 m)
- Listed weight: 225 lb (102 kg)

Career information
- High school: St. Dominic High School (Oyster Bay, New York)
- College: South Carolina (1969–1972)
- NBA draft: 1972: 1st round, 8th overall pick
- Drafted by: New York Knicks
- Playing career: 1972–1975
- Position: Center / power forward
- Number: 6

Career history
- 1972–1973: New York Knicks
- 1973: Allentown Jets
- 1973–1975: New York Knicks

Career highlights
- Consensus first-team All-American (1972); First-team Parade All-American (1968)
- Stats at NBA.com
- Stats at Basketball Reference

Thomas E. Riker (born February 28, 1950) is an American former professional basketball player for the New York Knicks of the National Basketball Association (NBA). He was a 6'10", 225 lb. center.

Riker was selected 8th overall in the 1972 NBA draft by the New York Knicks out of the University of South Carolina, and played three seasons for the Knicks from 1972 to 1975.

Riker was also selected in the 1972 ABA Draft by the Carolina Cougars.

== Career statistics ==
Legend
GP	Games played	GS	Games started	MPG	Minutes per game
FG%	Field goal percentage	3P%	3-point field goal percentage	FT%	Free throw percentage
RPG	Rebounds per game	APG	Assists per game	SPG	Steals per game
BPG	Blocks per game	PPG	Points per game	**Bold**	Career high

=== NBA ===
==== Regular season ====
Year	Team	GP	GS	MPG	FG%	FT%	RPG	APG	SPG	BPG	PPG
1972–73	New York	14	0	4.6	.417	.625	1.1	.1			2.5
1973–74	New York	17	0	3.4	**.448**	**.706**	.9	.2	.0	.0	2.2
1974–75	New York	**51**	**1**	**9.5**	.361	.561	**2.1**	**.4**	**.3**	**.1**	**3.0**
Career		82	1	7.4	.380	.593	1.7	.3	.2	.1	2.7

==== Playoffs ====
Year	Team	GP	MPG	FG%	FT%	RPG	APG	SPG	BPG	PPG
1975	New York	1	8.0	.500	–	2.0	1.0	.0	.0	2.0
