= Granelli's Ice Cream =

Confectionary shop established in 1873

Granelli's Ice Cream is a sweet shop in Sheffield, England.

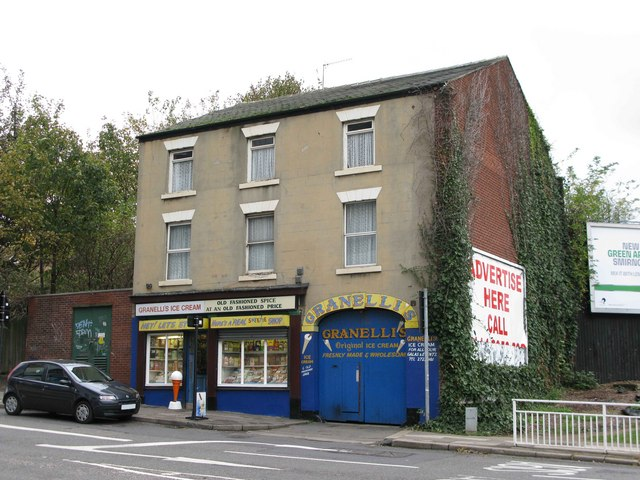
Granelli’s in 2009

== History ==
Granelli's was founded in 1873, by Italian immigrant Luigi Granelli from Genoa. The shop originally operated on Scotland Street, before moving to Broad Street the following year, where it has stood for over 150 years. The shop originally sold Ice Cream, which was an industry popular with many Italian immigrants in Sheffield. When Luigi died, the business was taken over by his sons Charles and Peter. Charles' daughter Rosita married Barry Hunt in 1980, with the business today being operated by their son Julian Hunt.

The shop has become an important institution in the city, and is one of the few remaining businesses in the country focusing solely on old-fashioned British sweets.
