= Gianelli =

Gianelli is a surname. Notable people with the surname include:

- Carlos Gianelli (1948–2021), Uruguayan lawyer and diplomat
- John Gianelli (born 1950), American basketball player
- William Gianelli (1919–2020), United States Army personnel

== See also ==
- 21588 Gianelli, main-belt asteroid
- Gianelli Power Plant, power plant in California.
