= John Gianelli =

American basketball player (born 1950)

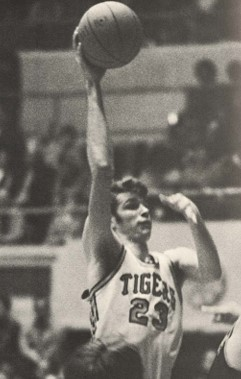
- Gianelli as a junior at Pacific

Personal information
- Born: June 10, 1950 (age 76) Stockton, California, U.S.
- Listed height: 6 ft 10 in (2.08 m)
- Listed weight: 220 lb (100 kg)

Career information
- High school: Edison (Stockton, California)
- College: Pacific (1969–1972)
- NBA draft: 1972: 2nd round, 20th overall pick
- Drafted by: Houston Rockets
- Playing career: 1972–1983
- Position: Center / power forward
- Number: 40

Career history
- 1972–1976: New York Knicks
- 1976–1977: Buffalo Braves
- 1977–1979: Milwaukee Bucks
- 1979: Utah Jazz
- 1980–1983: Olimpia Billy Milano

Career highlights
- Italian League champion (1982); NBA champion (1973); WCAC Player of the Year (1971); First-team All-WCAC (1971); Second-team All-WCAC (1970); No. 23 retired by Pacific Tigers

Career NBA statistics
- Points: 4,210 (7.8 ppg)
- Rebounds: 3,188 (5.9 rpg)
- Assists: 832 (1.5 apg)
- Stats at NBA.com
- Stats at Basketball Reference

John Arec Gianelli (born June 10, 1950) is an American former professional basketball player. At a height of 6 ft 10 in (2.08 m) tall, he played at the power forward and center positions. He played eight seasons (from 1972 to 1980) in the National Basketball Association (NBA) with the New York Knicks, Buffalo Braves, Milwaukee Bucks, and Utah Jazz.

== College career ==
Gianelli graduated from Edison High School in 1968. He matriculated at the University of the Pacific where he was a three-year letterman with the Tigers men's basketball team in 1970, 1971 and 1972. He averaged 21.5 points and 17.2 rebounds in his senior year, the latter ranked second in the nation. His uniform number 23 was retired in May 1973, the second in Pacific's men's basketball history. He was inducted into the university's Athletics Hall of Fame in 1986.

== Professional career ==
Gianelli was selected by the Houston Rockets twentieth overall in the second round of the 1972 NBA draft. After not agreeing to contract terms with the Rockets, his NBA negotiation rights were obtained by the Knicks on September 19, 1972.

He was involved in four other transactions during his NBA career, the first two within a year of each other. He was traded along with $3.3 million from the Knicks to the Braves for Bob McAdoo and Tom McMillen on December 9, 1976. Gianelli was sent from the Braves to the Bucks for a first-round pick in the 1979 NBA draft (eventually dealt to the Detroit Pistons) and cash nine months later on September 2, 1977.

The final two transactions happened within five months of each other. He was traded along with the eighth overall selection in the first round of the 1979 NBA draft (Calvin Natt) from the Bucks to the New Jersey Nets for Harvey Catchings on May 31, 1979. He never appeared in a game with the Nets, as he was dealt along with Bernard King and Jim Boylan to the Jazz for Rich Kelley and cash on October 2.

He averaged 7.8 points and 5.9 rebounds per game in his NBA career, and won a league championship with New York in 1973. He also played professionally in Italy for three years, with Olimpia Milano. He was the starting center and one of two foreign players on the Olimpia Milano team that captured the 1981–82 Lega Basket Serie A championship; the other foreigner was starting point guard Mike D'Antoni.

== NBA career statistics ==
Legend
GP	Games played	GS	Games started	MPG	Minutes per game
FG%	Field goal percentage	3P%	3-point field goal percentage	FT%	Free throw percentage
RPG	Rebounds per game	APG	Assists per game	SPG	Steals per game
BPG	Blocks per game	PPG	Points per game	**Bold**	Career high
†	Won an NBA championship	*	Led the league

=== Regular season ===
Year	Team	GP	GS	MPG	FG%	3P%	FT%	RPG	APG	SPG	BPG	PPG
1972–73†	New York	52	-	9.9	.451	-	.697	2.9	0.5	-	-	3.5
1973–74	New York	70	-	20.3	.479	-	**.760**	4.9	1.1	0.3	0.6	7.3
1974–75	New York	80	-	**35.0**	.472	-	.692	8.6	2.0	0.5	**1.5**	10.3
1975–76	New York	**82**	-	28.4	.473	-	.713	6.7	1.4	0.3	0.8	9.3
1976–77	New York	19	-	33.2	.473	-	.729	**9.4**	1.4	**0.7**	**1.5**	**10.9**
1976–77	Buffalo	57	-	22.5	.431	-	.714	5.2	1.0	0.4	1.2	7.0
1977–78	Milwaukee	**82**	-	28.4	**.488**	-	.642	6.2	**2.3**	**0.7**	1.1	8.5
1978–79	Milwaukee	**82***	-	25.1	.486	-	.706	5.0	2.0	0.5	0.7	7.1
1979–80	Utah	17	-	16.8	.348	.000	.563	3.6	1.0	0.4	0.4	3.2
Career		541	-	25.2	.470	.000	.702	5.9	1.5	0.5	1.0	7.8

=== Playoffs ===
Year	Team	GP	GS	MPG	FG%	3P%	FT%	RPG	APG	SPG	BPG	PPG
1972–73†	New York	7	-	7.9	**.550**	-	.429	1.9	0.1	-	-	3.6
1973–74	New York	**12**	-	28.2	.407	-	.720	**7.3**	**1.9**	0.3	0.5	7.3
1974–75	New York	3	-	31.0	.458	-	**1.000**	4.7	0.7	0.0	**1.3**	**8.3**
1977–78	Milwaukee	9	-	**32.2**	.424	-	.769	6.4	1.6	**0.9**	1.2	7.8
Career		31	-	25.0	.434	-	.721	5.6	1.3	0.5	0.9	6.7
