= Mel Davis =

American basketball player

Personal information
- Born: November 9, 1950 (age 76) New York City, New York, U.S.
- Listed height: 6 ft 6 in (1.98 m)
- Listed weight: 220 lb (100 kg)

Career information
- High school: Boys (Brooklyn, New York)
- College: St. John's (1970–1972)
- NBA draft: 1973: 1st round, 14th overall pick
- Drafted by: New York Knicks
- Position: Power forward
- Number: 31

Career history
- 1973–1976: New York Knicks
- 1977: Allentown Jets
- 1977: New York Nets
- 1978: New York Guard
- 1978–1979: Manner Novara
- 1979–1980: Pallacanestro Milano 1958

Career highlights
- NYC Basketball Hall of Fame (1998); Third-team All-American – NABC (1972); Second-team Parade All-American (1969)
- Stats at NBA.com
- Stats at Basketball Reference

Melvyn Jerome Davis (born November 9, 1950) is an American former professional basketball player.

A 6'6" power forward from St. John's University, Davis played four seasons (1973–1977) in the National Basketball Association as a member of the New York Knicks and New York Nets. He averaged 5.3 points and 4.3 rebounds in his NBA career.

After taking his basketball career to Europe, where he played in Italy, France, and Switzerland, Davis oversaw the marketing division of PepsiCo. Shortly after, he returned to the NBA and began a long career running player programs; orienting rookies and helping players make a smooth transition to the world post-basketball. In 2005, he was personally appointed by David Stern and accepted the position of executive director of the National Basketball Retired Players Association.

Davis holds a marketing degree from St. John's, master's degrees in psychology and counseling from Fordham University, and a master's degree in career planning from New York University. He was inducted into the NYC Basketball Hall of Fame in 1998.

== Career statistics ==
Legend
GP	Games played	GS	Games started	MPG	Minutes per game
FG%	Field goal percentage	3P%	3-point field goal percentage	FT%	Free throw percentage
RPG	Rebounds per game	APG	Assists per game	SPG	Steals per game
BPG	Blocks per game	PPG	Points per game	**Bold**	Career high

=== NBA ===
==== Regular season ====
Year	Team	GP	GS	MPG	FG%	FT%	RPG	APG	SPG	BPG	PPG
1973–74	N.Y. Knicks	30	0	5.6	.347	.750	1.8	.3	.1	**.1**	2.6
1974–75	N.Y. Knicks	**62**	**15**	14.6	.390	.686	5.2	.9	.3	**.1**	5.7
1975–76	N.Y, Knicks	42	2	9.7	**.394**	**.759**	3.5	.7	.4	**.1**	4.1
1976–77	N.Y. Knicks	22	7	15.5	.373	.710	4.5	1.1	.4	.0	4.7
1976–77	N.Y. Nets	34		**22.1**	.359	.700	**5.7**	**1.4**	**.6**	**.1**	**8.7**
Career		190	24	13.5	.376	.709	4.3	.9	.3	.1	5.3

==== Playoffs ====
Year	Team	GP	MPG	FG%	FT%	RPG	APG	SPG	BPG	PPG
1974	N.Y. Knicks	**4**	3.0	**.500**	–	**1.3**	.0	.0	.0	3.0
1975	N.Y. Knicks	3	**9.3**	.417	**1.000**	**1.3**	**.7**	.0	.0	**4.0**
Career		7	5.7	.458	1.000	1.3	.3	.0	.0	3.4
