= Friendship College =

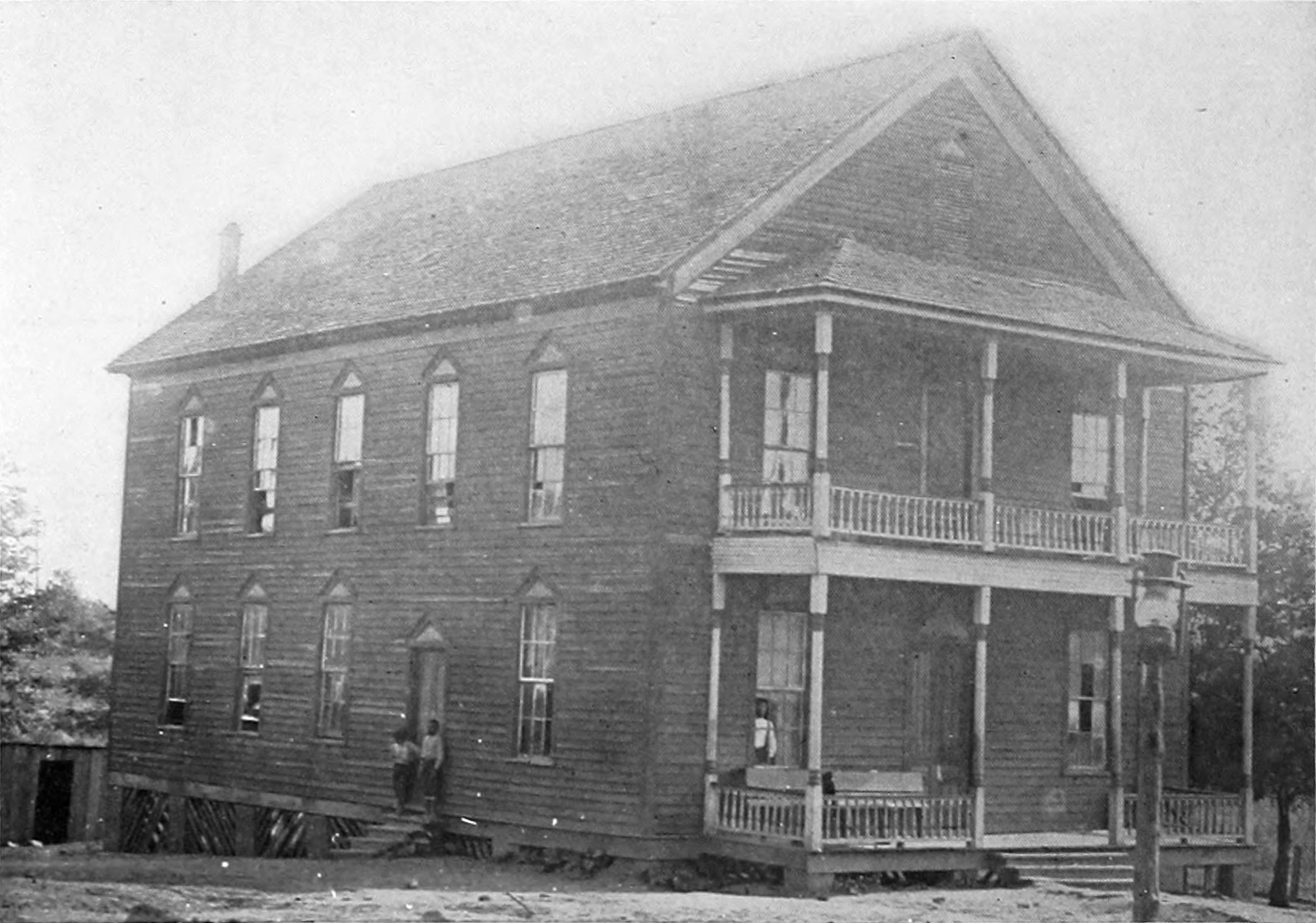
- Friendship college as it appeared in 1910
- Former names: Friendship Normal and Industrial College, Friendship Junior College
- Type: Historically black college
- Active: October 12, 1891–December 16, 1981
- Founder: Masel Phillip Hall
- Religious affiliation: Baptist
- Location: Rock Hill, South Carolina, 29730, United States; 34.927970°N 81.032830°W
- Colors: Purple and Gold
- Sporting affiliations: South Atlantic Athletic Conference
- Mascot: Tigers

Friendship College was a private Baptist historically black college, established in 1891 and located in Rock Hill, South Carolina, United States. The school was closed permanently in 1981, and demolished after a fire.

The founding president of Friendship College was M.P. Hall.

== Athletics ==
Friendship college had teams in baseball, football, and basketball. One basketball player from the school, Harthorne Wingo, played in the NBA and was an NBA Finals champion. Their football team lost 106–0 to Florida Normal in 1947, and 142–0 to Edward Waters in 1964.

== See also ==
- Friendship Nine
