= Red Holzman =

American basketball player and coach (1920–1998)

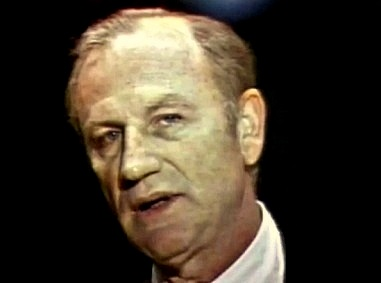
- Holzman in the 1970s

Personal information
- Born: August 10, 1920 New York City, U.S.
- Died: November 13, 1998 (aged 78) New Hyde Park, New York, U.S.
- Listed height: 5 ft 10 in (1.78 m)
- Listed weight: 175 lb (79 kg)

Career information
- High school: Franklin K. Lane (New York City)
- College: Baltimore (1939–1940); CCNY (1940–1942)
- Playing career: 1945–1954
- Position: Point guard
- Number: 10, 16
- Coaching career: 1953–1982

Career history

Playing
- 1945–1953: Rochester Royals
- 1953–1954: Milwaukee Hawks

Career highlights
- As player: NBA champion (1951); NBL champion (1946); 2× All-NBL First Team (1946, 1948); All-NBL Second Team (1947); NBL Rookie of the Year (1946); Third-team All-American – Converse (1942); As coach: 2× NBA champion (1970, 1973); NBA Coach of the Year (1970); 2× NBA All-Star Game Coach (1970, 1971); 3× BSN champion (1964–1966); Top 10 Coaches in NBA History; Top 15 Coaches in NBA History; No. 613 honored by New York Knicks

Career BAA & NBA playing statistics
- Points: 2,166 (6.1 ppg)
- Rebounds: 344 (1.5 rpg)
- Assists: 721 (2.0 apg)
- Stats at NBA.com
- Stats at Basketball Reference

Career coaching record
- NBA: 696–603 (.536)
- Record at Basketball Reference
- Basketball Hall of Fame

William "Red" Holzman (August 10, 1920 – November 13, 1998) was an American professional basketball player and coach. He is best known as the head coach of the New York Knicks of the National Basketball Association (NBA) from 1967 to 1977, and again from 1978 to 1982. Holzman helped lead the Knicks to two NBA championships in 1970 and 1973, and was inducted into the Basketball Hall of Fame in 1986.

In 1996, Holzman was named one of the Top 10 Coaches in NBA History.

== Early life ==
William "Red" Holzman was born on August 10, 1920, on the Lower East Side of Manhattan in New York City, to Jewish immigrant parents, as the son of a Romanian mother and Russian father. He grew up in Brooklyn's Ocean Hill–Brownsville neighborhood and played basketball for Franklin K. Lane High School in the mid-1930s.

== College Career ==
Holzman attended the University of Baltimore and later the City College of New York, where he played for two years until he graduated in 1942. Holzman joined the United States Navy in the same year, and played on the Norfolk, Virginia Naval Base team until he was discharged from the Navy in 1945.

== Professional career ==
=== Rochester Royals (1945–1953) ===
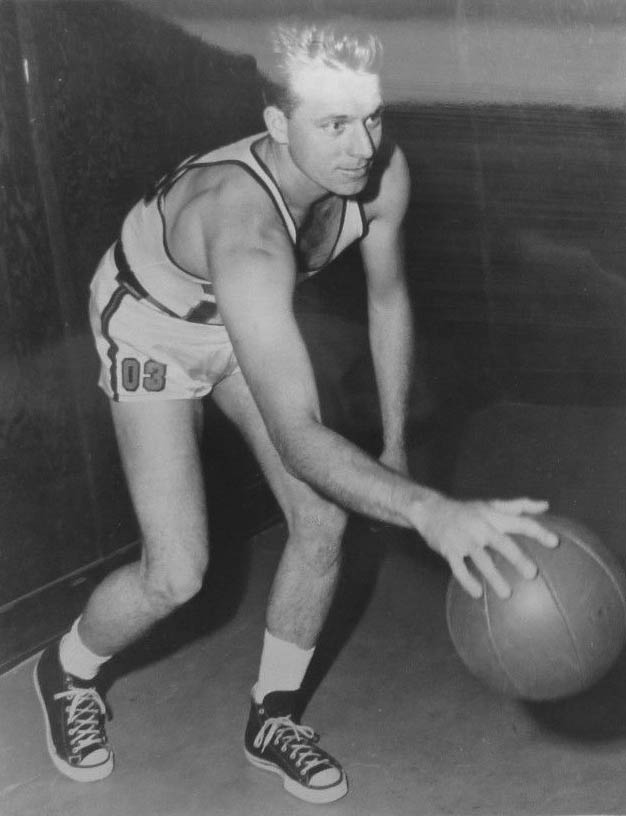
Holzman in 1950 with the Rochester Royals

After the Navy, Holzman joined the NBL Rochester Royals, which won the NBL championship in Holzman's first season, and he was named Rookie of the Year in 1944–45. In 1945–46 and 1947–48 he was on the NBL's first All League team; in the interim year he was on its second team. Holzman stayed with the team through their move to the NBA and subsequent NBA championship in 1951.

=== Milwaukee Hawks (1953–1954) ===
In 1953, Holzman left the Royals and joined the Milwaukee Hawks as a player-coach, eventually retiring as a player in 1954 but continuing as the team's head coach.

== Coaching career ==
=== Milwaukee / St. Louis Hawks (1953–1957) ===
During the 1956–1957 season, the Hawks (then in St. Louis, Missouri) lost 19 of their first 33 games, and Holzman was fired.

=== Leones de Ponce (1963–1967) ===
Holzman coached Leones de Ponce (basketball) from 1963 to 1967, winning three consecutive championships from 1964 to 1966.

=== New York Knicks (1967–1977, 1978–1982) ===
After being fired by the Hawks, Holzman then became a scout for the New York Knicks for the next ten years, until 1967 when he became the team's head coach for the most part until 1982. Holzman's former player, Willis Reed, replaced him as Knicks head coach in 1977, but Holzman returned near the start of the 1978–1979 season. During this 15-year span as Knicks' coach, Holzman won a total of 613 games.

In 1969, Holzman coached the Knicks to a then single-season NBA record 18-game win streak, breaking the 17-game record first set back in 1946. For his efforts leading up to the Knicks' 1970 championship win, Holzman was named the NBA Coach of the Year for that year. He won his second NBA championship as the Knicks won the 1973 NBA Finals against the Lakers. He was one of very few individuals to have won an NBA championship as both player and coach. As a coach, his final record was 696 wins and 604 losses. At the time of his retirement in 1982, he had the second most career victories as a head coach in NBA history.

== Post-playing career ==
In 1985, Holzman was elected into the Naismith Memorial Basketball Hall of Fame. The New York Knicks have retired the number 613 in his honor, equaling the number of wins he accumulated as their head coach. He is also a member of the International Jewish Sports Hall of Fame and the New York City Basketball Hall of Fame.

== Personal life ==
Holzman lived with his wife in a home they bought in Cedarhurst, New York in the 1950s. Following his lengthy NBA coaching career, Holzman was diagnosed with leukemia and died at Long Island Jewish Medical Center in New Hyde Park, New York in 1998. In 2000, a clock tower was erected in his honor at the intersection of Central Avenue and Cedarhurst Avenue in Cedarhurst as part of “Operation Downtown,” a project started by Nassau County presiding officer Bruce Blakeman and mayor Andy Parise.

== Career statistics ==
=== BAA/NBA ===
Legend
GP	Games played	GS	Games started	MPG	Minutes per game
FG%	Field goal percentage	3P%	3-point field goal percentage	FT%	Free throw percentage
RPG	Rebounds per game	APG	Assists per game	SPG	Steals per game
BPG	Blocks per game	PPG	Points per game	**Bold**	Career high
†	Won an NBA championship

==== Regular season ====
Year	Team	GP	MPG	FG%	FT%	RPG	APG	PPG
1948–49	Rochester	60	–	.326	.611	–	2.5	**9.1**
1949–50	Rochester	**68**	–	**.330**	.686	–	**2.9**	8.2
1950–51†	Rochester	**68**	–	.326	**.726**	**2.2**	2.2	7.3
1951–52	Rochester	65	**16.4**	.280	.718	1.6	1.8	4.1
1952–53	Rochester	46	8.5	.255	.711	.9	.8	2.2
1953–54	Milwaukee	51	12.7	.330	.658	.9	1.5	3.8
Career		358	13.0	.317	.682	1.5	2.0	6.1

==== Playoffs ====
Year	Team	GP	MPG	FG%	FT%	RPG	APG	PPG
1949	Rochester	4	–	**.450**	**.833**	–	**3.3**	**10.3**
1950	Rochester	2	–	.333	.500	–	.0	3.5
1951†	Rochester	**14**	–	.408	.676	**1.4**	1.4	6.1
1952	Rochester	6	**10.8**	.200	.167	1.0	.3	1.2
1953	Rochester	2	7.0	.200	.250	.5	.5	1.5
Career		28	9.9	.386	.596	1.2	1.3	5.1

- Source: Basketball Reference

=== College ===
Year	Team	GP	PPG
1940–41	CCNY	21	10.9
1941–42	CCNY	18	12.5
Career		39	11.6

- Source: Basketball-Reference.com

== Head coaching record ==
Legend
Regular season	G	Games coached	W	Games won	L	Games lost	W–L %	Win–loss %
Playoffs	PG	Playoff games	PW	Playoff wins	PL	Playoff losses	PW–L %	Playoff win–loss %

Team	Year	G	W	L	W–L%	Finish	PG	PW	PL	PW–L%	Result
Milwaukee Hawks	1953–54	26	10	16	.385	4th in Western	—	—	—	—	Missed playoffs
Milwaukee Hawks	1954–55	72	26	46	.361	4th in Western	—	—	—	—	Missed playoffs
St. Louis Hawks	1955–56	72	33	39	.458	3rd in Western	8	4	4	.500	Lost in Western Division finals
St. Louis Hawks	1956–57	33	14	19	.424	—	—	—	—	—	—
New York Knicks	1967–68	45	28	17	.622	3rd in Eastern	6	2	4	.333	Lost in Eastern Division semifinals
New York Knicks	1968–69	82	54	28	.659	3rd in Eastern	10	6	4	.600	Lost in Eastern Division finals
New York Knicks	1969–70	82	60	22	.732	1st in Eastern	19	12	7	.632	Won NBA Championship
New York Knicks	1970–71	82	52	30	.634	1st in Eastern	12	7	5	.583	Lost in Conference semifinals
New York Knicks	1971–72	82	48	34	.585	2nd in Eastern	16	9	7	.563	Lost in NBA Finals
New York Knicks	1972–73	82	57	25	.695	2nd in Eastern	17	12	5	.706	Won NBA Championship
New York Knicks	1973–74	82	49	33	.598	2nd in Eastern	12	5	7	.417	Lost in Conference finals
New York Knicks	1974–75	82	40	42	.488	3rd in Eastern	3	1	2	.333	Lost in First round
New York Knicks	1975–76	82	38	44	.463	4th in Eastern	—	—	—	—	Missed playoffs
New York Knicks	1976–77	82	40	42	.488	3rd in Eastern	—	—	—	—	Missed playoffs
New York Knicks	1978–79	68	25	43	.368	4th in Eastern	—	—	—	—	Missed playoffs
New York Knicks	1979–80	82	39	43	.476	4th in Eastern	—	—	—	—	Missed playoffs
New York Knicks	1980–81	82	50	32	.610	3rd in Eastern	2	0	2	.000	Lost in First round
New York Knicks	1981–82	82	33	49	.402	5th in Eastern	—	—	—	—	Missed playoffs
Career		1300	696	604	.535		105	58	47	.552	

- Source: Basketball Reference

== Publications ==
- Holzman, Red (1970). The Red Holzman Pro Basketball Guide 70-71. Aurora Publishers. OCLC 423856.
- Holzman, Red (1971). The Knicks. Dodd, Mead & Co. ISBN 978-0-396-06342-1.
- Holzman, Red; Lewin, Leonard (1973). Holzman's Basketball: Winning Strategy and Tactics (1st ed.). The Macmillan Company. ISBN 978-0-0255-3500-8.
- Holzman, Red (1974). Defense! Defense!. Warner Paperback Library. ISBN 978-0-446-78498-6.
- Holzman, Red (1980). A View from the Bench (1st ed.). W. W. Norton & Company. ISBN 978-0-393-33623-8.
- Holzman, Red (1987). Red on Red: The Autobiography of Red Holzman. Bantam Books. ISBN 978-0-553-27316-8.
- Holzman, Red (1991). Holzman on Hoops: The Man Who Led the Knicks Through Two World Championships Tells It Like It Was. Taylor Publishing Company. ISBN 978-0-878-33745-3.
- Holzman, Red; Lewin, Leonard (1993). My Unforgettable Season 1970 (1st ed.). Tor Books. ISBN 978-0-312-85453-9.

== See also ==
- List of select Jewish basketball players
