= Bob McAdoo =

American basketball player (born 1951)

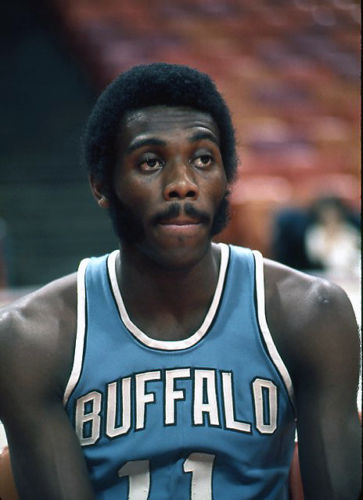
- McAdoo with the Buffalo Braves in 1973

Miami Heat
- Title: Community liaison
- League: NBA

Personal information
- Born: September 25, 1951 (age 75) Greensboro, North Carolina, U.S.
- Listed height: 6 ft 9 in (2.06 m)
- Listed weight: 210 lb (95 kg)

Career information
- High school: Ben L. Smith (Greensboro, North Carolina)
- College: Vincennes (1969–1971); North Carolina (1971–1972)
- NBA draft: 1972: 1st round, 2nd overall pick
- Drafted by: Buffalo Braves
- Playing career: 1972–1992
- Position: Center
- Number: 11, 21
- Coaching career: 1995–2014

Career history

Playing
- 1972–1976: Buffalo Braves
- 1976–1979: New York Knicks
- 1979: Boston Celtics
- 1979–1981: Detroit Pistons
- 1981: New Jersey Nets
- 1981–1985: Los Angeles Lakers
- 1986: Philadelphia 76ers
- 1986–1990: Olimpia Milano
- 1990–1992: Filanto Forlì
- 1992: Teamsystem Fabriano

Career highlights
- As player: 2× NBA champion (1982, 1985); NBA Most Valuable Player (1975); 5× NBA All-Star (1974–1978); All-NBA First Team (1975); All-NBA Second Team (1974); NBA Rookie of the Year (1973); NBA All-Rookie Team (1973); 3× NBA scoring champion (1974–1976); NBA 75th Anniversary Team; FIBA Intercontinental Cup champion (1987); 2× EuroLeague champion (1987, 1988); EuroLeague Final Four MVP (1988); 50 Greatest EuroLeague Contributors (2008); 2× Italian League champion (1987, 1989); Italian Cup winner (1987); Consensus first-team All-American (1972); First-team All-ACC (1972); NJCAA All American (1971); As assistant coach: 3× NBA champion (2006, 2012, 2013)

Career NBA statistics
- Points: 18,787 (22.1 ppg)
- Rebounds: 8,048 (9.4 rpg)
- Blocks: 1,147 (1.5 bpg)
- Stats at NBA.com
- Stats at Basketball Reference
- Basketball Hall of Fame
- Collegiate Basketball Hall of Fame

Robert Allen McAdoo Jr. (/ˈmækəˌdu/ MAK-ə-doo; born September 25, 1951) is an American former professional basketball player and coach. He played 14 seasons in the National Basketball Association (NBA), where he was a five-time NBA All-Star and named the NBA Most Valuable Player (MVP) in 1975. He won two NBA championships in four consecutive trips to the Finals in four years with the Showtime Los Angeles Lakers of the 1980s. In 2000, McAdoo was inducted into the Naismith Basketball Hall of Fame. He was named to the NBA 75th Anniversary Team in 2021.

The #2 pick of the 1972 NBA draft out of the University of North Carolina, McAdoo played center for the majority of his career, splitting the balance of his time between power and small forward. In a 21-year playing career, he spent his first 14 seasons in the NBA and final seven in the Lega Basket Serie A in Italy. McAdoo is one of the few players who have won both NBA and the FIBA European Champions Cup (EuroLeague) titles as a player. He later won three more NBA titles in 2006, 2012 and 2013 as an assistant coach with the Miami Heat.

== Early life ==
McAdoo was raised in Greensboro, North Carolina. His mother, Vandalia, taught at his grade school, and his father, Robert, was a custodian at North Carolina A&T University. McAdoo attended Ben L. Smith High School, where he participated in basketball and track and played saxophone in the marching band.

As a senior, he led Ben L. Smith to the state basketball semifinals, and was the NCHSAA high jump state champion, where he set a new state record of 6 feet 7.75 inches, beating out future North Carolina Tarheel teammate and fellow Basketball Hall of Famer Bobby Jones.

== College career ==
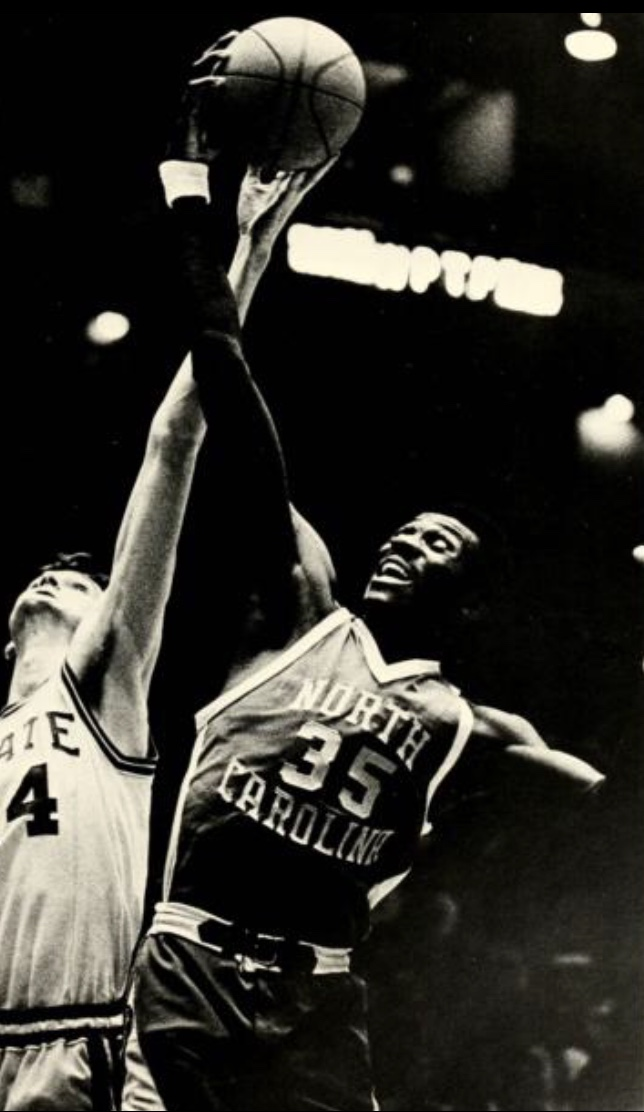
McAdoo in his lone season at UNC

Coming out of high school in 1969, McAdoo lacked the academic test scores required by the Division I schools, so he enrolled for two years at Vincennes University, then a junior college, in Vincennes, Indiana. He averaged 19.3 points and 10 rebounds as a freshman, leading Vincennes to the NJCAA Men's Division I Basketball Championship in 1970 with 27 points in the title game. His roommate was teammate and fellow future NBA point guard Foots Walker. As a sophomore, he averaged 25.0 points and 11.0 rebounds, and was named a Junior College All-American in 1971.

McAdoo played for Team USA at the 1971 Pan American Games, in the summer 1971, averaging 11.0 points per game.

McAdoo enrolled at the University of North Carolina in the Fall of 1971, the only junior college player Dean Smith recruited in his career.

"We didn't really recruit him," Coach Dean Smith said. "His mother called us to start it. She said all the other schools were recruiting him. Why weren't we?"

Playing alongside Bobby Jones, McAdoo led Smith's 1971–72 Tar Heels to a 26–5 record and the Final Four of the 1972 NCAA University Division basketball tournament. McAdoo averaged 19.5 points and 10.1 rebounds. He was named first-team All-American. He also earned MVP honors at the ACC tournament.

Following that success, McAdoo consulted with Coach Dean Smith, who encouraged him to leave college early for the NBA. Citing family hardship, McAdoo sought and won early eligibility for the 1972 NBA draft under the "hardship" clause that existed until 1977. McAdoo said, "When I left, a lot of people were very angry and upset. But Dean gave me his blessing. He told me, 'If they're going to offer you this kind of money, I think you should leave to help you and your family.' I had his blessing. My mother was totally against it," McAdoo added, "but my father and Dean Smith were the guys who got me to move."

== Professional career ==
=== 1972 ABA and NBA drafts ===
McAdoo sought and won early eligibility in the 1972 NBA draft, and was selected as the number two overall pick by the Buffalo Braves.

It had been rumored that McAdoo had signed with the Virginia Squires of the rival American Basketball Association after a "secret" ABA draft in which names of those drafted were not made public. Even though no contract was produced and McAdoo denied it, NBA Commissioner Walter Kennedy reportedly had advised NBA teams not to draft McAdoo. Other reports were that a contract was signed and voided, because McAdoo was too young to have signed it and that Buffalo somehow knew this. Later, McAdoo was indeed selected as the No. 1 pick of the 1972 ABA draft.

=== Buffalo Braves (1972–1976) ===
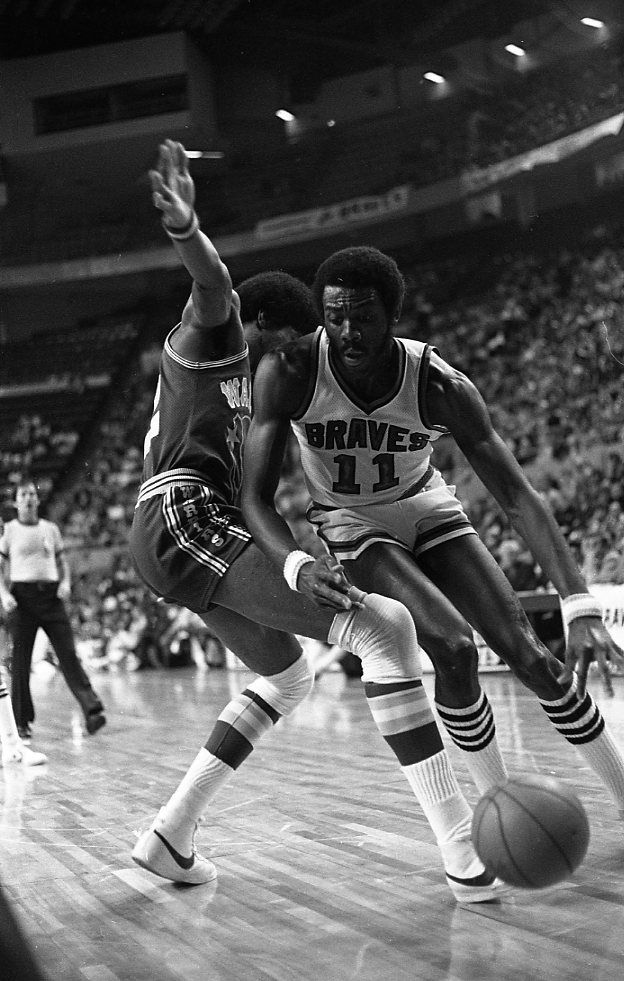
McAdoo (11) playing for the Buffalo Braves

After rumored contract talks between the number one draft pick-holding Portland Trail Blazers and McAdoo failed to come to fruition, Portland selected fellow center LaRue Martin, and Buffalo took the plunge on McAdoo with the number 2 pick. McAdoo signed, but quickly became frustrated with Buffalo's losing in his rookie season, saying, "Here I was sitting at Buffalo, we were on the way to losing 61 games and we didn't have any players. My wife could have outrun those people."

In spite of this, he immediately became one of the NBA's premier players, winning the 1973 NBA Rookie of the Year Award and being named to the NBA All-Rookie First Team.

In his second season, McAdoo exploded into the limelight, earning the first of three consecutive NBA scoring titles while leading the NBA in field goal percentage and shooting 54.7 percent. He also enjoyed his first of five All-Star selections and led Buffalo to its first playoff appearance. On February 22, 1974, he scored 52 points to go along with 22 rebounds and 7 blocks against the Boston Celtics. At 22 years old (and 150 days), McAdoo is the youngest NBA player to have had a 50-point/20-rebound game. (Note: Spencer Haywood, who played in the American Basketball Association, which later merged with the NBA, is the youngest ABA/NBA player with a 50 point/20 rebound game, as he did so at the age of 20 in 1970.) He was the last player to record a stat-line of 50 points, 20 rebounds, and 5 blocks in a game until Victor Wembanyama did so 52 years later. In the first round, the Braves would lose to Dave Cowens and the eventual-champion Boston Celtics. McAdoo's performance in the 1973-74 season remains the last time an NBA player has averaged both 30.0 points and 15.0 rebounds per game.

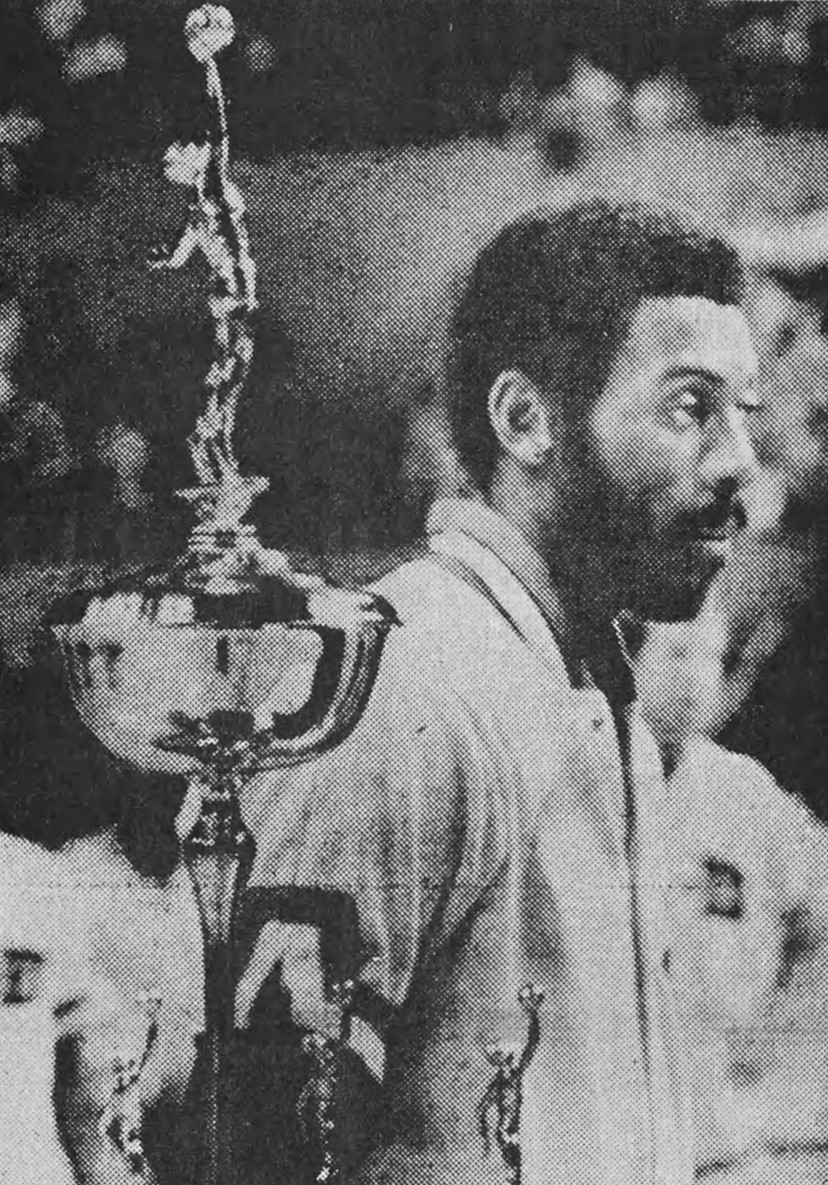
McAdoo next to his NBA Most Valuable Player trophy in 1975

In 1974–75, he was awarded the NBA Most Valuable Player Award, averaging 34.5 points, 14.1 rebounds and 2.12 blocks per game, while shooting 51.2 percent from the field and 80.5 percent from the free throw line. He also led the league in fan voting for the 1975 All-Star Game with 98,325 votes. That season, with McAdoo aided by strong play from Jim McMillian and Randy Smith, the Braves would finish with an improved 49–33 record, though again they would lose in the opening round of the playoffs, this time in seven games to Elvin Hayes, Wes Unseld, and the Washington Bullets

McAdoo averaged 30.3 points, 18.7 rebounds, and 4.3 assists in 47.3 minutes per game in the 1975-76 season, capturing his third scoring crown. The Braves finally advanced out of the first round in the 1976 NBA Playoffs, beating the Philadelphia 76ers, before falling to the eventual champion Boston Celtics.

The following season, on December 7, 1976, McAdoo grabbed a career-high 29 rebounds, while adding 42 points, in a 107–103 loss to the Indiana Pacers. Two days later, McAdoo was traded by the Buffalo Braves with Tom McMillen to the New York Knicks for John Gianelli and cash.

McAdoo's style was very modern for his time. Primarily a center, he excelled at shooting from the perimeter, which, in his prime, made him a nearly unstoppable force on offense and a valuable offensive boost off the bench. In 334 games with Buffalo, the 6 ft 9 in (2.06 m) McAdoo averaged 28.2 points, 12.7 rebounds, 2.6 assists, 2.4 blocks and 1.1 steals.

=== New York Knicks (1976–1979) ===
Joining the Knicks, McAdoo played alongside future Hall of Fame teammates Walt Frazier, Earl Monroe, Spencer Haywood, Bill Bradley and Phil Jackson. In 52 games with the Knicks in 1976–77 under Hall of Fame Coach Red Holzman, McAdoo averaged 26.7 points, 12.7 rebounds, 2.7 assists, 1.3 blocks and 1.2 steals. Still, the Knicks finished 40–42, and missed the playoffs.

In 1977–78, the Knicks finished 43–39 under new coach, Hall of Famer Willis Reed, as McAdoo averaged 26.5 points, 12.8 rebounds, 3.8 assists, 1.6 blocks and 1.3 steals in 79 games. The Knicks defeated the Cleveland Cavaliers 2–0 in the Eastern Conference Playoffs, before losing to the Philadelphia 76ers with Julius Erving 4–0 in the Eastern Conference semi-finals. McAdoo averaged 34.0 points, 9.0 rebounds and 2.0 assists in the Cavaliers series and 18.8 points, 10.0 rebounds, 4.8 assists, 2.3 blocks and 1.5 steals in the 76ers series.

In 1978–79, the Knicks fired Reed and rehired Holtzman mid-season. On January 23, 1979, McAdoo scored his most points as a Knick, with 45 in a 148–124 loss to Los Angeles Lakers. After 40 games with the Knicks, McAdoo was averaging 26.9 points, 9.5 rebounds and 3.2 assists when he was traded on February 12, 1979, to the Boston Celtics for Tom Barker and three first-round picks in the 1979 NBA draft. The Knicks used them on Bill Cartwright with the third pick, Larry Demic with the ninth, and Sly Williams with the 21st.

In 171 games with the Knicks, McAdoo averaged 26.7 points, 12.0 rebounds, 3.3 assists, 1.4 blocks and 1.3 steals.

=== Boston Celtics (1979) ===
In his tenure with Boston under player/Coach Dave Cowens, Boston finished 29–53. McAdoo averaged 20.6 points, 7.1 rebounds, playing fewer minutes in a frontcourt with Cowens, Cedric Maxwell, Marvin Barnes and Rick Robey.

After the season Boston fired Cowens as coach, replaced him with Bill Fitch, and 6'9" forward Larry Bird arrived from Indiana State.

On September 6, 1979, McAdoo was traded by the Celtics to the Detroit Pistons for the first and thirteenth overall picks in the 1980 NBA draft, an arrangement made as compensation for Boston signing veteran free agent M.L. Carr on July 24, 1979. Boston later traded the #1 pick to the Golden State Warriors in return for center Robert Parish and the #3 overall pick, which it used to select Kevin McHale, netting them two Hall of Famers. Golden State picked Joe Barry Carroll.

=== Detroit Pistons (1979–1981) ===
In 1979–80, McAdoo joined a Pistons team that finished 16–66 under coaches Dick Vitale (4–8), who had encouraged the trade for McAdoo, and Vitale's replacement Richie Adubato (12–58). Playing alongside Hall of Famer Bob Lanier, McAdoo averaged 21.1 points and 8.1 rebounds in 58 games.

On February 19, 1981, McAdoo, who had been injured, claimed he was healthy and asked to be reinstated into the Pistons starting lineup. Coach Scotty Robertson denied his request, saying McAdoo had not practiced and was not in proper physical shape. McAdoo asked to be allowed to go home and was allowed to leave. The next day Pistons general manager Jack McCloskey notified McAdoo to not return for the rest of the season. On March 11, 1981, McAdoo was waived by the Pistons after playing in only six games with the team in 1980–81, as Detroit finished 21–61. He would be the last Piston to wear #11 before the arrival of Isiah Thomas.

=== New Jersey Nets (1981) ===
On March 13, 1981, McAdoo signed as a free agent with the New Jersey Nets. He played ten games with the Nets, averaging 15 minutes per contest as the Nets finished 24–58.

=== Los Angeles Lakers (1981–1985) ===
On December 24, 1981, McAdoo was traded by the New Jersey Nets to the Los Angeles Lakers for a 1983 2nd round draft pick (Kevin Williams was later selected). McAdoo had not played for the Nets in the 1981–82 season and power forward/center Mitch Kupchak had become injured for the Lakers. McAdoo reflected on his situation in an interview years later:

As the 1981–82 season began, I was in the middle of a contract dispute with the New Jersey Nets. However, I couldn't even play since I was still recovering from off-season surgery to have bone spurs removed from my foot. There were times, standing around on crutches for months, when I thought my career was over. But I got a call from the Lakers on Christmas Eve. They had just lost a key player, Mitch Kupchak, who blew out his knee. In the short term, they were hoping I could fill his void coming off the bench. In the long term, I think they were hoping I could help the team get headed in the right direction.

McAdoo had a transition to a reserve, winning two NBA titles with the Showtime Lakers in 1982 and 1985 as instant offense off the bench. The former MVP was silently frustrated coming off the bench behind players such as Jim Brewer, Mark Landsberger, and Kurt Rambis, but sacrificed a starting role to be able to play with championship caliber players like Kareem Abdul-Jabbar, Magic Johnson, and James Worthy

In 1981–82, the Lakers won the 1982 NBA Championship, as Pat Riley had taken over coaching from Paul Westhead. Riley and McAdoo thus began a professional relationship that continued for decades. In 41 games with the Lakers, McAdoo averaged 9.6 points and 3.9 rebounds in 18.2 minutes in the regular season. During the 1982 playoffs, he was quoted as stating, "That championship is the one thing I don't have … I'll do whatever I need to ... get it". In the 1982 NBA Finals, McAdoo averaged 16.3 points in 27 minutes as the Lakers defeated the Philadelphia 76ers in six games. In the entire playoffs, McAdoo averaged 16.7 points and 6.8 rebounds.

McAdoo re-signed with the Lakers for the 1982–83 season, declining a more lucrative offer from the Philadelphia 76ers in order to remain with the Lakers.

Averaging 15.0 points in 1982-1983 and 13.1 points in 1983–84 for the Lakers in the next two seasons, the team finished 58–24 and 54–28. McAdoo played with a severely injured hamstring in the 1983 playoffs. "If we could have had Mac (McAdoo) healthy, we might have had a shot," coach Riley said after the 1983 loss to the Philadelphia 76ers in the NBA Finals.

McAdoo averaged 12.5 points and 5.5 rebounds as the Lakers lost 4–3 to the Boston Celtics in the 1984 NBA Finals.

McAdoo helped the Lakers to another NBA Championship in 1984–85, defeating Boston 4–2 in the NBA Finals. McAdoo was the 6th man, averaging 8.2 points and 3.0 rebounds in the 1985 NBA Finals and 11.4 points in the entire playoffs. After the season, the Lakers did not re-sign McAdoo, instead offering a contract to veteran Maurice Lucas for the 6th man role.

"It was a great opportunity for me to play with Kareem and Magic," McAdoo said of his tenure with the Lakers. "For the first time in my career, I had a chance to win a championship. But I had no thoughts at all in my mind about coming off the bench. It just happened. To me it was a wrap I would start. They didn't have anyone who could stick with me at that position, but I dealt with it because I had never been on a championship team. And I've never been one to cause disruption or anything like that."

=== Philadelphia 76ers (1986) ===
On January 31, 1986, McAdoo signed as a free agent with the Philadelphia 76ers.

He finished his NBA career with 29 games for the Philadelphia 76ers in the 1985–86 season, averaging 10.1 points alongside Julius Erving, Moses Malone and Charles Barkley. McAdoo averaged 10.8 points in the 76ers two playoff series.

=== NBA career totals ===
In his 852 game NBA career, McAdoo scored 18,787 career points. He averaged 22.1 points, 9.4 rebounds, 2.3 assists, 1.5 blocks and 1.0 steals per game. He played for the Buffalo Braves (1972–1976), New York Knicks (1976–1979), Boston Celtics (1979), Detroit Pistons (1979–1980), New Jersey Nets (1980–1981), Los Angeles Lakers (1981–1985) and Philadelphia 76ers (1986).

=== Italian League (1987–1992) ===
After his NBA career ended, McAdoo played in Italy, first playing with Olimpia Milano, as one of the best American players ever seen in Europe, and the FIBA European Champions Cup (now known as the EuroLeague). McAdoo played with Olimpia Milano from the 1986–87 season, to the 1989–90 season. He led the club to two straight FIBA European Champions Cup (EuroLeague) titles, in the 1986–87 and 1987–88 seasons, being named the EuroLeague Final Four MVP in 1988. With the same club, he also won the FIBA Intercontinental Cup (1987), two Italian League championships (1987, 1989), and the Italian Cup (1987).

Later, he played with the Italian clubs Filanto Forlì (1990–92) and Teamsystem Fabriano (1992), before retiring from playing professional basketball, in 1992, at age 41. In his last season, he retired after playing in just 2 games. In seven seasons in the Italian League, McAdoo played in 201 games, and averaged 27.0 points and 8.9 rebounds per game. In three seasons in the EuroLeague, all as a member of Olimpia Milano, he averaged 25.8 points per game overall, averaging 21.8 points per game in 1986–87, 29.1 points per game in 1987–88, and 25.5 points per game in 1989–90.

== Coaching/scouting career ==
Beginning in 1995, McAdoo worked 25 years for the Miami Heat, being recruited to the organization by Pat Riley, his coach for four seasons and two championships with the Showtime Lakers in the 1980s. Riley had just left the New York Knicks to become the Heat's head coach and GM.

McAdoo remained an assistant coach with Miami for 19 seasons under Riley (1995–2003, 2005–2008), Stan Van Gundy (2003–2005) and Erik Spoelstra (2008–2013), winning three NBA championships. He has since worked the last five seasons as a scout and community liaison for the team.

== Personal life ==
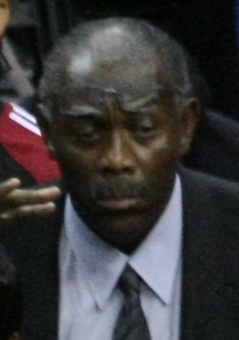
McAdoo in 2009

McAdoo was first married to Brenda; they had two children: son Robert III, who lives in Florida, and daughter Rita, who lives in New Jersey. The marriage ended in divorce. His second wife, Charlina, died of cancer in 1991, at age 34. They had two children together - sons Ross, who lives in Alaska, and Russell, who lives in New Jersey.

McAdoo and his third wife, Patrizia, whom he met while playing basketball professionally in Italy, live in Boca Raton, Florida. They have two children. Their daughter Rasheeda graduated from Georgia Tech, where she played on the tennis team and qualified for the 2017 NCAA Singles Championship. She plays professional tennis on the WTA tour. Their son Ryan played basketball at the University of North Carolina, Chapel Hill. He is currently part of the basketball operations staff of the Sioux Falls Skyforce, an NBA G League affiliate of the Miami Heat.

In 2010, McAdoo took part in the Basketball Without Borders program in Singapore, which uses sport to create a positive social change in areas of education, health and wellness. He also participated in the program in Beijing in 2009, and the NBA Legends Tour to South Africa in 1993, a goodwill mission to promote the NBA. McAdoo was also the basketball technical adviser for the 1993 feature film, "The Air Up There", starring Kevin Bacon.

In 2012, McAdoo was treated for a blood clot in his leg.

McAdoo's second cousin, Ronnie McAdoo, is the father of James Michael McAdoo, who also played for the Tar Heels basketball team and turned pro in 2014. In 2013, former NFL player Ephraim Salaam revealed that he is a nephew of McAdoo.

== Honors ==
- In 1993, McAdoo was inducted into the North Carolina Sports Hall of Fame.
- McAdoo was inducted into the Greater Buffalo Sports Hall of Fame in 1995. McAdoo still holds the Braves/Clippers record for most minutes played per game (40.1), field goals made per game (11.1), and field goal attempts per game (22.1).
- McAdoo was enshrined in the Naismith Memorial Basketball Hall of Fame in 2000.
- In 2006, McAdoo was inducted into the College Basketball Hall of Fame.
- In 2008, he was named to the 50 Greatest EuroLeague Contributors.
- McAdoo was inducted into the Olimpia Milano Hall of Fame, in 2013.
- In 2016, the gymnasium at Ben L. Smith High School (Guilford County School District) was named after McAdoo.
- In 2019, McAdoo was honored, along with seven others, by the University of North Carolina on a banner displaying UNC alumni who had been elected to the Naismith Basketball Hall of Fame.
- McAdoo is a member of the Guilford County Sports Hall of Fame.
- In 2021, McAdoo was elected to the NBA 75th Anniversary Team.
- In September 2025, he received the Key of the City of Greensboro, and Benbow Park's basketball court was named in his honor.

== NBA career statistics ==
Legend
GP	Games played	GS	Games started	MPG	Minutes per game
FG%	Field goal percentage	3P%	3-point field goal percentage	FT%	Free throw percentage
RPG	Rebounds per game	APG	Assists per game	SPG	Steals per game
BPG	Blocks per game	PPG	Points per game	**Bold**	Career high
†	Won an NBA championship	*	Led the league

=== Regular season ===
Year	Team	GP	GS	MPG	FG%	3P%	FT%	RPG	APG	SPG	BPG	PPG
1972–73	Buffalo	80	—	32.0	.452	—	.774	9.1	1.7	—	—	18.0
1973–74	Buffalo	74	—	43.0	**.547***	—	.793	**15.1**	2.3	1.2	**3.3**	30.6*
1974–75	Buffalo	**82**	—	**43.2***	.512	—	.805	14.1	2.2	1.1	2.1	**34.5***
1975–76	Buffalo	78	—	42.7*	.487	—	.762	12.4	**4.0**	1.2	2.1	31.1*
1976–77	Buffalo	20	—	38.4	.455	—	.696	13.2	3.3	0.8	1.7	23.7
1976–77	New York	52	—	39.1	.534	—	.757	12.7	2.7	1.2	1.3	26.7
1977–78	New York	79	—	40.3	.520	—	.727	12.8	3.8	1.3	1.6	26.5
1978–79	New York	40	—	39.9	.541	—	.651	9.5	3.2	**1.6**	1.2	26.9
1978–79	Boston	20	—	31.9	.500	—	.670	7.1	2.0	0.6	1.0	20.6
1979–80	Detroit	58	—	36.2	.480	**.125**	.730	8.1	3.4	1.3	1.1	21.1
1980–81	Detroit	6	—	28.0	.366	—	.600	6.8	3.3	1.3	1.2	12.0
1980–81	New Jersey	10	—	15.3	.507	.000	**.810**	2.6	1.0	0.9	0.6	9.3
1981–82†	L.A. Lakers	41	0	18.2	.458	.000	.714	3.9	0.8	0.5	0.9	9.6
1982–83	L.A. Lakers	47	1	21.7	.520	.000	.730	5.3	0.8	0.9	0.9	15.0
1983–84	L.A. Lakers	70	0	20.8	.471	.000	.803	4.1	1.1	0.6	0.7	13.1
1984–85†	L.A. Lakers	66	0	19.0	.520	.000	.753	4.5	1.0	0.3	0.8	10.5
1985–86	Philadelphia	29	0	21.0	.462	—	.765	3.6	1.2	0.3	0.6	10.1
Career		852	?	33.2	.503	.081	.754	9.4	2.3	1.0	1.5	22.1
All-Star		5	3	25.2	.578	—	.737	6.0	1.2	0.8	0.4	17.6

=== Playoffs ===
Year	Team	GP	GS	MPG	FG%	3P%	FT%	RPG	APG	SPG	BPG	PPG
1974	Buffalo	6	—	45.2	.478	—	.809	13.7	1.5	1.0	2.2	31.7
1975	Buffalo	7	—	**46.7***	.481	—	.740	13.4	1.4	0.9	**2.7**	**37.4***
1976	Buffalo	9	—	45.1*	.451	—	.707	**14.2**	3.2	0.8	2.0	28.0
1978	New York	6	—	39.7	.484	—	.600	9.7	**3.8**	1.2	2.0	23.8
1982†	L.A. Lakers	14	—	27.7	**.564**	—	.681	6.8	1.6	0.7	1.5	16.7
1983	L.A. Lakers	8	—	20.8	.440	.333	.786	5.8	0.6	**1.4**	1.3	10.9
1984	L.A. Lakers	**20**	—	22.4	.516	.000	.704	5.4	0.6	0.6	1.4	14.0
1985†	L.A. Lakers	19	0	20.9	.472	.000	.745	4.5	0.8	0.5	1.4	11.4
1986	Philadelphia	5	0	14.6	.556	—	**.875**	2.8	0.4	0.8	1.0	10.8
Career		94	0	28.9	.491	.250	.724	7.6	1.4	0.8	1.6	18.3

== See also ==
- List of NBA annual scoring leaders
- List of NBA annual minutes leaders
- List of NBA single-game playoff scoring leaders
