= 1976–77 New York Knicks season =

Season of National Basketball Association team the New York Knicks

- Head coach: Red Holzman
- General manager: Eddie Donovan
- Arena: Madison Square Garden

Results
- Record: 40–42 (.488)
- Place: Division: 3rd (Atlantic); Conference: 7th (Eastern)
- Playoff finish: Did not qualify
- Stats at Basketball Reference

Local media
- Television: WOR-TV; Manhattan Cable Television
- Radio: WNEW

The 1976–77 New York Knicks season was the 31st season for the team in the National Basketball Association (NBA). In the regular season, the Knicks finished in third place in the Atlantic Division, and failed to qualify for the 1977 NBA Playoffs. Bob McAdoo, a mid-season trade acquisition, led the Knicks in points per game (26.7) and rebounds per game (12.7), while Walt Frazier had a team-high 5.3 assists per game.

In the 1976 NBA draft, New York did not have a first-round pick, having been stripped of it in 1975 after attempting to sign American Basketball Association player George McGinnis, whose NBA rights were held by the Philadelphia 76ers. With their first selection, the Knicks chose Lonnie Shelton in the second round with the 25th overall pick. On November 30, 1976, the Knicks played their first game against the New York Nets in the regular season, losing 104–103. In December, the Knicks traded with the Buffalo Braves for McAdoo and Tom McMillen, sending John Gianelli and $3 million. McAdoo started in the 1977 NBA All-Star Game, and Earl Monroe was selected as a reserve. Coach Red Holzman stepped down at the end of the 1977 season, Willis Reed was named his replacement, and Holzman accepted a role as consultant. Bill Bradley also retired after the season and started a career in politics.

== Draft picks ==
Note: This is not an extensive list; it only covers the first and second rounds, and any other players picked by the franchise that played at least one game in the league.

Round	Pick	Player	Position	Nationality	School/Club team
2	25	Lonnie Shelton	F/C	United States	Oregon State

== Roster ==
1976–77 New York Knicks roster
Players

Pos.	No.	Player	Height	Weight	DOB	From
G	9	Butch Beard	6 ft 3 in (1.91 m)	185 lb (84 kg)		Louisville
F	24	Bill Bradley	6 ft 5 in (1.96 m)	205 lb (93 kg)		Princeton
G	14	Ticky Burden	6 ft 2 in (1.88 m)	185 lb (84 kg)		Utah
G	10	Walt Frazier	6 ft 4 in (1.93 m)	200 lb (91 kg)		Southern Illinois
F	42	Spencer Haywood	6 ft 8 in (2.03 m)	225 lb (102 kg)		Detroit Mercy
F	18	Phil Jackson	6 ft 8 in (2.03 m)	220 lb (100 kg)		North Dakota
G	35	Mo Layton	6 ft 1 in (1.85 m)	180 lb (82 kg)		USC
F/C	11	Bob McAdoo	6 ft 9 in (2.06 m)	210 lb (95 kg)		North Carolina
C	52	Tom McMillen	6 ft 11 in (2.11 m)	215 lb (98 kg)		Maryland
F	5	Jim McMillian	6 ft 5 in (1.96 m)	215 lb (98 kg)		Columbia
G	7	Dean Meminger	6 ft 0 in (1.83 m)	175 lb (79 kg)		Marquette
G	15	Earl Monroe	6 ft 3 in (1.91 m)	185 lb (84 kg)		Winston-Salem State
F	8	Lonnie Shelton	6 ft 8 in (2.03 m)	240 lb (109 kg)		Oregon State

Coaches
Head coach
- Red Holzman (CCNY)
Assistant(s)
- Dick McGuire (Dartmouth)

Legend
- (DP) Unsigned draft pick
- (FA) Free agent
- (S) Suspended
- Injured

== Regular season ==
=== Season standings ===
Atlantic Division	W	L	PCT	GB	Home	Road	Div
y-Philadelphia 76ers	50	32	.610	–	32–9	18–23	11–5
x-Boston Celtics	44	38	.537	6	28–13	16–25	9–7
New York Knicks	40	42	.488	10	26–15	14–27	8–8
Buffalo Braves	30	52	.366	20	23–18	7–34	6–10
New York Nets	22	60	.268	28	10–31	12–29	6–10

#	Eastern Conference				
#	Team	W	L	PCT	GB
1	z-Philadelphia 76ers	50	32	.610	–
2	y-Houston Rockets	49	33	.598	1
3	x-Washington Bullets	48	34	.585	2
4	x-Boston Celtics	44	38	.537	6
5	x-San Antonio Spurs	44	38	.537	6
6	x-Cleveland Cavaliers	43	39	.524	7
7	New York Knicks	40	42	.488	10
8	New Orleans Jazz	35	47	.427	15
9	Atlanta Hawks	31	51	.378	19
10	Buffalo Braves	30	52	.366	20
11	New York Nets	22	60	.268	28

z – clinched division title
y – clinched division title
x – clinched playoff spot
