= 1976–77 Buffalo Braves season =

NBA professional basketball team season

- Head coach: Tates Locke; Joe Mullaney
- Arena: Buffalo Memorial Auditorium

Results
- Record: 30–52 (.366)
- Place: Division: 4th (Atlantic); Conference: 10th (Eastern)
- Playoff finish: Did not qualify
- Stats at Basketball Reference

Local media
- Television: WBEN-TV
- Radio: WBEN

The 1976–77 NBA season was the Braves seventh season in the NBA. The Braves were purchased by John Y. Brown, Jr., the former owner of the Kentucky Colonels in the now defunct American Basketball Association for $6.2 million. As part of an agreement with the Braves' former owner, Paul Snyder, Brown would give Snyder money received in player deals to reduce the purchase price. The sell-off began shortly after the season, as the Braves sold newly acquired Moses Malone. Malone was acquired in a trade with the Portland Trail Blazers after the ABA dispersal draft. Malone was now off to the Houston Rockets. The selling of players continued into the season as Bob McAdoo was sold to the New York Knicks. While the deals helped Brown pay virtually nothing for the franchise, it turned a promising franchise into a rebuilding one. Attendance fell off as the Braves finished in 4th place with a 30–52 record. The only spotlight was rookie Adrian Dantley, who captured Rookie of the Year honors with 20.3 points per game. However Dantley himself was traded following the season to the Indiana Pacers for Billy Knight.

== Offseason ==
Coach Ramsay had been hired in 1972 to a three-year contract. He served the 1975–76 season on a one-year extension. His contract was not renewed. Ramsay had guided the Braves to the playoffs three years in a row after enduring a 21–61 season, accumulating a 158–170 overall record. Local reports noted a personality conflict with owner Snyder. The Braves promoted assistant coach Tates Locke and signed him to a two-year contract.

Snyder threatened to sell the Braves if they did not sell 5,000 season tickets by June 12, 1976. However the season ticket drive by the Chamber of Commerce and other civic groups only resulted in 2,552 sales by the deadline date. In June 1976, Diplomat Hotel owner Irving Cowan obtained an option to purchase the Braves for $6.1 million, and planned to bring them to South Florida and the Hollywood Sportatorium. Pledges of more than 8,000 season tickets were received in Florida. On June 15, Snyder announced the planned sale. The Wall Street Journal estimated the sale price to be in the $7–8 million range. However, the next day the city of Buffalo sued the Braves for breach of contract and sought a restraining order preventing the move. The suit was filed in New York Supreme Court for seeking $10 million from the Braves and the NBA for breaking a promise to sign a new 15-year lease. Another suit was filed as an anti-trust case in United States district court against the rest of the NBA seeking $48 million in damages in the event of a move. The anti-trust case alleged that the move was an attempt to eliminate competition against a future Toronto NBA franchise and to discourage expansion of the American Basketball Association to southern Florida. The damages arose as treble damages related to a March 1 promise to sign a lease. Although Cowan claimed the move would still take place, the effort collapsed under the weight of the lawsuit and the Braves ended up signing a new lease with the city of Buffalo. In July, the Braves signed a new lease with the city for the Memorial Auditorium with the understanding that there was an ongoing effort to sell the team to local interests. The signing of the lease settled the lawsuits.

=== NBA draft ===
| Round | Pick | Player | Position | Nationality | College |
|---|---|---|---|---|---|
| 1 | 6 | Adrian Dantley | Forward | United States | Notre Dame |
| 3 | 48 | Gary Brewster | Forward | United States | UTEP |
| 6 | 100 | Danny Odums | Guard | United States | Fairfield |
| 7 | 118 | Frank Jones | Guard | United States | Tennessee Tech |
| 8 | 136 | Mark McAndrew | Guard | United States | Providence College |
| 9 | 153 | Bob Rozyczko | Forward | United States | St. Bonaventure |
| 10 | 169 | Tim Stokes | Guard | United States | Canisius College |

=== ABA Dispersal Draft ===
The American Basketball Association joined the NBA with the ABA–NBA merger in 1976. Of the teams remaining in the ABA, four joined the NBA. The remaining two ABA teams that did not join the NBA, the Kentucky Colonels and the Spirits of St. Louis, had their players assigned to a dispersal draft for draft purposes.

| Pick | Player | Nationality | NBA Team | ABA Team | Purchase Price |
|---|---|---|---|---|---|
| 7 | Bird Averitt (PG) | United States | Buffalo Braves | Kentucky Colonels | $125,000 |

== Roster ==
1976–77 Buffalo Braves roster
Players

| Pos. | No. | Player | Height | Weight | DOB | From |
|---|---|---|---|---|---|---|
| F | 35 | Zaid Abdul-Aziz | 6 ft 9 in (2.06 m) | 235 lb (107 kg) | | Iowa State |
| F | 10 | Don Adams | 6 ft 7 in (2.01 m) | 210 lb (95 kg) | | Northwestern |
| G | 14 | Bird Averitt | 6 ft 2 in (1.88 m) | 175 lb (79 kg) | | Pepperdine |
| G | 44 | Adrian Dantley | 6 ft 5 in (1.96 m) | 210 lb (95 kg) | | Notre Dame |
| G | 15 | Ernie DiGregorio | 6 ft 0 in (1.83 m) | 180 lb (82 kg) | | Providence |
| G | 5 | Fred Foster | 6 ft 5 in (1.96 m) | 220 lb (100 kg) | | Miami (OH) |
| F | 22 | Gus Gerard | 6 ft 8 in (2.03 m) | 205 lb (93 kg) | | Virginia |
| C | 40 | John Gianelli | 6 ft 10 in (2.08 m) | 220 lb (100 kg) | | Pacific |
| C | 52 | George Johnson | 6 ft 11 in (2.11 m) | 205 lb (93 kg) | | Dillard |
| C | 22 | Moses Malone | 6 ft 10 in (2.08 m) | 255 lb (116 kg) | | Petersburg H.S. |
| F | 22 | Clyde Mayes | 6 ft 9 in (2.06 m) | 225 lb (102 kg) | | Furman |
| C | 11 | Bob McAdoo | 6 ft 9 in (2.06 m) | 210 lb (95 kg) | | North Carolina |
| C | 52 | Tom McMillen | 6 ft 11 in (2.11 m) | 215 lb (98 kg) | | Maryland |
| G | 21 | John Neumann | 6 ft 6 in (1.98 m) | 200 lb (91 kg) | | Mississippi |
| G | 25 | Jim Price | 6 ft 3 in (1.91 m) | 195 lb (88 kg) | | Louisville |
| F | 34 | John Shumate | 6 ft 9 in (2.06 m) | 235 lb (107 kg) | | Notre Dame |
| G | 9 | Randy Smith | 6 ft 3 in (1.91 m) | 185 lb (84 kg) | | Buffalo State |
| G | 12 | Claude Terry | 6 ft 5 in (1.96 m) | 195 lb (88 kg) | | Stanford |
| G | 11 | Chuck Williams | 6 ft 3 in (1.91 m) | 185 lb (84 kg) | | Colorado |

Coaches
Head coach
- Tates Locke
- Bob MacKinnon (interim)
- Joe Mullaney (interim)
Assistant(s)
- Bob MacKinnon

Legend
- (DP) Unsigned draft pick
- (FA) Free agent
- (S) Suspended
- Injured

=== Roster notes ===
- Center Moses Malone played in only 2 games before being traded to the Houston Rockets in October.
- Guard Johnny Neumann and forward Clyde Mayes played in only 4 games and 2 games respectively before being waived in November.
- Centers Bob McAdoo & Tom McMillen were traded to the New York Knicks and guard Jim Price was traded to the Denver Nuggets in December.
- Forward Zaid Abdul-Aziz played in 22 games before being waived in January.
- Guard Claude Terry played in 33 games before he was purchased by the Atlanta Hawks in February.

== Regular season ==
=== Season standings ===
| Atlantic Division | W | L | PCT | GB | Home | Road | Div |
|---|---|---|---|---|---|---|---|
| y-Philadelphia 76ers | 50 | 32 | .610 | – | 32–9 | 18–23 | 11–5 |
| x-Boston Celtics | 44 | 38 | .537 | 6 | 28–13 | 16–25 | 9–7 |
| New York Knicks | 40 | 42 | .488 | 10 | 26–15 | 14–27 | 8–8 |
| Buffalo Braves | 30 | 52 | .366 | 20 | 23–18 | 7–34 | 6–10 |
| New York Nets | 22 | 60 | .268 | 28 | 10–31 | 12–29 | 6–10 |

| # | Eastern Conference | | | | |
| # | Team | W | L | PCT | GB |
|---|---|---|---|---|---|
| 1 | z-Philadelphia 76ers | 50 | 32 | .610 | – |
| 2 | y-Houston Rockets | 49 | 33 | .598 | 1 |
| 3 | x-Washington Bullets | 48 | 34 | .585 | 2 |
| 4 | x-Boston Celtics | 44 | 38 | .537 | 6 |
| 5 | x-San Antonio Spurs | 44 | 38 | .537 | 6 |
| 6 | x-Cleveland Cavaliers | 43 | 39 | .524 | 7 |
| 7 | New York Knicks | 40 | 42 | .488 | 10 |
| 8 | New Orleans Jazz | 35 | 47 | .427 | 15 |
| 9 | Atlanta Hawks | 31 | 51 | .378 | 19 |
| 10 | Buffalo Braves | 30 | 52 | .366 | 20 |
| 11 | New York Nets | 22 | 60 | .268 | 28 |

== Game log ==
=== Regular season ===
1976–77 game log
Total: 30–52 (home: 23–18; road: 7–34)
October

| Game | Date | Team | Score | High points | High rebounds | High assists | Location Attendance | Record |

November

| Game | Date | Team | Score | High points | High rebounds | High assists | Location Attendance | Record |

December

| Game | Date | Team | Score | High points | High rebounds | High assists | Location Attendance | Record |

January

| Game | Date | Team | Score | High points | High rebounds | High assists | Location Attendance | Record |

February

| Game | Date | Team | Score | High points | High rebounds | High assists | Location Attendance | Record |

March

| Game | Date | Team | Score | High points | High rebounds | High assists | Location Attendance | Record |

April

| Game | Date | Team | Score | High points | High rebounds | High assists | Location Attendance | Record |

1976–77 schedule

== Player stats ==
Legend
| GP | Games played | MPG | Minutes per game | FG | Field-goals per game | FGA | Field-goals attempted per Game |
| FG% | Field-goal percentage | FT | Free-throws per game | FTA | Free-throws attempted per Game | FT% | Free-throw percentage |
| ORPG | Offensive rebounds per game | DRPG | Defensive rebounds per game | RPG | Rebounds per game | APG | Assists per game |
| SPG | Steals per game | BPG | Blocks per game | PFPG | Personal fouls per game | PPG | Points per game |

| Player | GP | MPG | FG | FGA | FG% | FT | FTA | FT% | ORPG | DRPG | RPG | APG | SPG | BPG | PFPG | PPG |
|---|---|---|---|---|---|---|---|---|---|---|---|---|---|---|---|---|
| Bob McAdoo | 20 | 38.4 | 9.1 | 20.0 | 0.455 | 5.5 | 7.9 | 0.696 | 3.3 | 9.9 | 13.2 | 3.3 | 0.8 | 1.7 | 3.7 | 23.7 |
| Randy Smith | 82 | 37.7 | 8.6 | 18.3 | 0.467 | 3.6 | 4.7 | 0.762 | 1.6 | 3.9 | 5.6 | 5.4 | 2.1 | 0.1 | 3.2 | 20.7 |
| Adrian Dantley | 77 | 36.6 | 7.1 | 13.6 | 0.520 | 6.2 | 7.6 | 0.818 | 3.3 | 4.4 | 7.6 | 1.9 | 1.2 | 0.2 | 2.8 | 20.3 |
| John Shumate | 74 | 35.1 | 5.5 | 10.9 | 0.502 | 4.1 | 6.1 | 0.671 | 2.2 | 7.3 | 9.5 | 2.1 | 1.2 | 1.1 | 2.7 | 15.1 |
| Ernie DiGregorio | 81 | 28.0 | 4.5 | 10.8 | 0.417 | 1.7 | 1.8 | 0.945 | 0.6 | 1.6 | 2.3 | 4.7 | 0.7 | 0.0 | 1.9 | 10.7 |
| George Johnson | 39 | 27.1 | 3.2 | 7.2 | 0.448 | 1.2 | 1.7 | 0.687 | 3.0 | 7.3 | 10.3 | 2.0 | 0.6 | 2.7 | 3.6 | 7.6 |
| John Gianelli | 57 | 22.5 | 3.0 | 7.0 | 0.431 | 1.0 | 1.4 | 0.714 | 1.6 | 3.6 | 5.2 | 1.0 | 0.4 | 1.2 | 2.1 | 7.0 |
| Don Adams | 77 | 22.2 | 2.8 | 6.8 | 0.411 | 1.7 | 2.2 | 0.746 | 1.7 | 3.1 | 4.8 | 1.9 | 1.0 | 0.2 | 2.6 | 7.3 |
| Jim Price | 20 | 16.7 | 2.2 | 5.2 | 0.423 | 0.9 | 1.0 | 0.850 | 0.3 | 1.5 | 1.7 | 1.9 | 1.3 | 0.3 | 2.6 | 5.3 |
| Bird Averitt | 75 | 15.1 | 3.1 | 8.3 | 0.378 | 1.6 | 2.3 | 0.716 | 0.3 | 0.8 | 1.0 | 1.8 | 0.4 | 0.1 | 1.7 | 7.9 |
| Gus Gerard | 41 | 14.4 | 2.4 | 6.0 | 0.410 | 1.0 | 1.5 | 0.656 | 1.2 | 1.6 | 2.9 | 1.0 | 0.6 | 0.8 | 2.2 | 5.9 |
| Tom McMillen | 20 | 13.5 | 2.3 | 4.6 | 0.489 | 1.3 | 1.8 | 0.722 | 1.5 | 2.2 | 3.6 | 0.8 | 0.1 | 0.1 | 1.5 | 5.8 |
| Chuck Williams | 44 | 12.6 | 1.0 | 2.7 | 0.368 | 0.9 | 1.1 | 0.792 | 0.4 | 1.1 | 1.5 | 2.0 | 0.5 | 0.1 | 0.8 | 2.8 |
| Johnny Neumann | 4 | 12.3 | 3.8 | 8.5 | 0.441 | 1.3 | 1.5 | 0.833 | 1.3 | 1.0 | 2.3 | 1.0 | 0.8 | 0.5 | 1.8 | 8.8 |
| Fred Foster | 59 | 11.7 | 1.7 | 4.2 | 0.401 | 0.5 | 0.7 | 0.682 | 0.6 | 0.7 | 1.3 | 0.8 | 0.3 | 0.0 | 1.6 | 3.9 |
| Claude Terry | 33 | 9.2 | 1.5 | 3.2 | 0.471 | 0.5 | 0.7 | 0.783 | 0.1 | 0.7 | 0.8 | 1.0 | 0.3 | 0.0 | 0.8 | 3.5 |
| Zaid Abdul-Aziz | 22 | 8.9 | 1.1 | 3.4 | 0.338 | 1.5 | 2.0 | 0.767 | 1.9 | 2.2 | 4.1 | 0.3 | 0.1 | 0.4 | 1.0 | 3.8 |
| Clyde Mayes | 2 | 3.5 | 0.0 | 1.5 | .000 | 1.0 | 1.5 | 0.667 | 0.0 | 1.5 | 1.5 | 0.0 | 0.0 | 0.0 | 1.0 | 1.0 |
| Moses Malone | 2 | 3.0 | 0.0 | 0.0 | | 0.0 | 0.0 | | 0.0 | 0.5 | 0.5 | 0.0 | 0.0 | 0.0 | 0.5 | 0.0 |

== Awards and honors ==
- Ernie DiGregorio, Led NBA, Free Throw Percentage, .945

== Transactions ==
The Braves sent Ken Charles and Dick Gibbs and cash to the Atlanta Hawks for Tom Van Arsdale. Van Arsdale never played for the Braves who traded him in August to the Phoenix Suns for a 1977 NBA draft 2nd round pick.

The Braves were involved in the following transactions during the 1976–77 season.

=== Coaching Change ===
Offseason
| Outgoing Coach | Date Removed | 1975-76 Record | Incoming Coach |
|---|---|---|---|
| Jack Ramsay | Fired, May 3, 1976 | 46–36 | Tates Locke |
In-season
| Outgoing coach | Date Removed | 1976-77 Record | Incoming coach |
| Tates Locke | Fired, January 25, 1977 | 16–30 | Bob MacKinnon (interim) |
| Bob MacKinnon (interim) | Demoted to assistant, February 16, 1977 | 3–4 | Joe Mullaney (interim) |

=== Trades ===
June 16, 1976
To Buffalo Braves

- Tom Van Arsdale
To Atlanta Hawks

- Ken Charles
- Dick Gibbs
August 5, 1976
To Buffalo Braves

- The 7th pick of 1976 ABA dispersal draft. (Bird Averitt of the Kentucky Colonels was chosen)
To Milwaukee Bucks

- 1977 2nd round draft pick
August 25, 1976
To Buffalo Braves

- 1977 2nd round draft pick
To Phoenix Suns

- Tom Van Arsdale
October 18, 1976
To Buffalo Braves

- Moses Malone
To Portland Trail Blazers

- 1978 1st round draft pick
October 24, 1976
To Buffalo Braves

- 1977 1st round draft pick
- 1978 1st round draft pick
To Houston Rockets

- Moses Malone
November 22, 1976
To Buffalo Braves

- Jim Price
To Milwaukee Bucks

- 1977 1st round draft pick
December 9, 1976
To Buffalo Braves

- John Gianelli
To New York Knicks

- Bob McAdoo
- Tom McMillen
December 15, 1976
To Buffalo Braves

- Gus Gerard
- Chuck Williams
To Denver Nuggets

- Jim Price
January 8, 1977
To Buffalo Braves

- George Johnson
To Golden State Warriors

- 1977 1st round draft pick

=== Free agents ===
==== Additions ====
| Player | Signed | Former team |
| Fred Foster | September 15 | Cleveland Cavaliers |
| Johnny Neumann | September 22 | Kentucky Colonels |
| Major Jones | September 23 | Portland Trail Blazers |
| Claude Terry | October 21 | Denver Nuggets |
| Clyde Mayes | November 9 | Indiana Pacers |
| Zaid Abdul-Aziz | November 26 | Seattle SuperSonics |

==== Subtractions ====
| Player | Left | New team |
| Major Jones | waived, September 28 | Atlanta Hawks |
| Bob Weiss | waived, September 29 | Washington Bullets |
| Dale Schlueter | waived, October 20 | Phoenix Suns |
| Johnny Neumann | waived, November 9 | Los Angeles Lakers |
| Clyde Mayes | waived, November 29 | Portland Trail Blazers |
| Zaid Abdul-Aziz | waived, January 20 | Boston Celtics |
| Claude Terry | contract sold, February 1 | Atlanta Hawks |
