= 1976–77 Boston Celtics season =

NBA basketball team season

- Head coach: Tom Heinsohn
- General manager: Red Auerbach
- Arena: Boston Garden; Hartford Civic Center

Results
- Record: 44–38 (.537)
- Place: Division: 2nd (Atlantic); Conference: 4th (Eastern)
- Playoff finish: Conference Semi–finals (lost to 76ers 3–4)
- Stats at Basketball Reference

Local media
- Television: WBZ-TV
- Radio: WBZ

The 1976–77 Boston Celtics season was the 31st season of the Boston Celtics in the National Basketball Association (NBA).

Even though the Celtics were the defending NBA champions, they were an aging team in transition. Thirty-five year old Don Nelson retired as a player, but the key contributors who remained were aging, namely John Havlicek (age 36), Jo Jo White (31), and Paul Silas (33). The Celtics took steps to get younger in the frontcourt by sending Silas to the Denver Nuggets in a three-way trade that ended up bringing Detroit Pistons forward Curtis Rowe. The Celtics also traded a first-round draft pick to the Portland Trail Blazers for Sidney Wicks. Wicks and Rowe would provide athleticism, the Celtics felt, and, more importantly, allow Havlicek to return to a sixth-man role and not log as many minutes as in the past.

Boston only won 44 games, the fewest since coach Tom Heinsohn's second season, and lost to their rivals Philadelphia, the league's eventual runners-up, in a seven-game series.

== Draft picks ==
The Celtics picked 16th in the 1976 NBA draft and selected Norm Cook, a 6–8, 210-lb. junior-eligible forward from the University of Kansas. Cook, however, did not contribute much, playing in only 25 games and averaging 2.5 points per game.

== Roster ==
1976–77 Boston Celtics roster
Players

Pos.	No.	Player	Height	Weight	DOB	From
C	34	Jim Ard	6 ft 8 in (2.03 m)	215 lb (98 kg)		Cincinnati
F	31	Tom Boswell	6 ft 9 in (2.06 m)	220 lb (100 kg)		South Carolina
F	52	Norm Cook	6 ft 8 in (2.03 m)	210 lb (95 kg)		Kansas
F/C	18	Dave Cowens	6 ft 9 in (2.06 m)	230 lb (104 kg)		Florida State
G/F	17	John Havlicek	6 ft 5 in (1.96 m)	203 lb (92 kg)		Ohio State
F/C	33	Steve Kuberski	6 ft 8 in (2.03 m)	215 lb (98 kg)		Bradley
F	41	Curtis Rowe	6 ft 7 in (2.01 m)	225 lb (102 kg)		UCLA
F	20	Fred Saunders	6 ft 7 in (2.01 m)	210 lb (95 kg)		Syracuse
G	11	Charlie Scott	6 ft 5 in (1.96 m)	175 lb (79 kg)		North Carolina
G	27	Kevin Stacom	6 ft 3 in (1.91 m)	185 lb (84 kg)		Providence
G	10	Jo Jo White	6 ft 3 in (1.91 m)	190 lb (86 kg)		Kansas
F	12	Sidney Wicks	6 ft 8 in (2.03 m)	225 lb (102 kg)		UCLA

Coaches
Head coach
- Tom Heinsohn
Assistant(s)
- John Killilea

Legend
- (DP) Unsigned draft pick
- (FA) Free agent
- (S) Suspended
- Injured

Roster

== Regular season ==
The Celtics started the season 4-0 (with their first two games entering overtime, as well having another overtime game during their sixth game of the season), but Wicks and Rowe had trouble fitting in with Celtic coach Tom Heinsohn's system, and the team played .500 ball for most of the season. Charlie Scott suffered a broken foot and only played 31 games, which meant Havlicek had to log more minutes, primarily at off-guard. Depth was a problem for the Celtics, as backup center Jim Ard was the only reliable reserve. Havlicek, White, and Cowens carried most of the scoring load for the team all season.

=== Season standings ===
Atlantic Division	W	L	PCT	GB	Home	Road	Div
y-Philadelphia 76ers	50	32	.610	–	32–9	18–23	11–5
x-Boston Celtics	44	38	.537	6	28–13	16–25	9–7
New York Knicks	40	42	.488	10	26–15	14–27	8–8
Buffalo Braves	30	52	.366	20	23–18	7–34	6–10
New York Nets	22	60	.268	28	10–31	12–29	6–10

#	Eastern Conference				
#	Team	W	L	PCT	GB
1	z-Philadelphia 76ers	50	32	.610	–
2	y-Houston Rockets	49	33	.598	1
3	x-Washington Bullets	48	34	.585	2
4	x-Boston Celtics	44	38	.537	6
5	x-San Antonio Spurs	44	38	.537	6
6	x-Cleveland Cavaliers	43	39	.524	7
7	New York Knicks	40	42	.488	10
8	New Orleans Jazz	35	47	.427	15
9	Atlanta Hawks	31	51	.378	19
10	Buffalo Braves	30	52	.366	20
11	New York Nets	22	60	.268	28

== Playoffs ==
1977 playoff game log
First Round: 2–0 (home: 1–0; road: 1–0)

Game	Date	Team	Score	High points	High rebounds	High assists	Location Attendance	Series
1	April 12	San Antonio	W 104–94	Jo Jo White (24)	Dave Cowens (13)	Dave Cowens (7)	Boston Garden; 13,505	1–0
2	April 15	@ San Antonio	W 113–109	Jo Jo White (38)	Sidney Wicks (12)	Cowens, Havlicek (9)	HemisFair Arena; 12,067	2–0

Conference semifinals: 3–4 (home: 2–1; road: 1–3)

Game	Date	Team	Score	High points	High rebounds	High assists	Location Attendance	Series
1	April 17	@ Philadelphia	W 113–111	Charlie Scott (22)	Dave Cowens (15)	Charlie Scott (8)	Spectrum; 13,821	1–0
2	April 20	@ Philadelphia	L 101–113	John Havlicek (31)	Dave Cowens (15)	Jo Jo White (7)	Spectrum; 18,276	1–1
3	April 22	Philadelphia	L 100–109	John Havlicek (25)	Wicks, Cowens (8)	Jo Jo White (7)	Boston Garden; 15,040	1–2
4	April 24	Philadelphia	W 124–119	Dave Cowens (37)	Dave Cowens (21)	John Havlicek (15)	Boston Garden; 15,040	2–2
5	April 27	@ Philadelphia	L 91–110	Charlie Scott (20)	Curtis Rowe (16)	Jo Jo White (7)	Spectrum; 18,276	2–3
6	April 29	Philadelphia	W 113–108	Jo Jo White (40)	Dave Cowens (19)	John Havlicek (6)	Boston Garden; 15,040	3–3
7	May 1	@ Philadelphia	L 77–83	Jo Jo White (17)	Dave Cowens (27)	Charlie Scott (6)	Spectrum; 18,276	3–4

1977 schedule
