= 1976–77 New York Nets season =

Professional basketball team season (1st in NBA)

- Head coach: Kevin Loughery
- Arena: Nassau Veterans Memorial Coliseum

Results
- Record: 22–60 (.268)
- Place: Division: 5th (Atlantic); Conference: 11th (Eastern)
- Playoff finish: Did not qualify
- Stats at Basketball Reference

Local media
- Television: WOR-TV; Cablevision Sports 3
- Radio: WMCA

The 1976–77 New York Nets season was the tenth season for the franchise, the ninth and final season where the team went by the New York Nets name after previously going by the New Jersey Americans in their first season in the now-defunct American Basketball Association, and the first for the team in the NBA. It was also their only NBA season that they played in Long Island before they moved back to New Jersey while retaining the Nets name they've had ever since their second season in the ABA. This season was notable for, as the franchise owner at the time Roy Boe described it, trading the team's very soul for a berth into the NBA since as they were the only ABA team intruding upon another NBA team's territory at the time (in this case, the New York Knicks' territory for the New York City area), the Nets in particular had to pay an extra fee for the Knicks just to play in the NBA. While the Nets tried to get the Knicks to waive the extra fee, to the point of even allowing them their star Julius Erving to join the Knicks instead, the Nets would only really make it by trading Erving to the Philadelphia 76ers in order to secure a berth into the NBA instead. Their forced trade of Dr. J to the 76ers just to secure their permanent entry into the NBA resulted in them going from being the final champions in ABA history to the worst team in the NBA in their first year of entry, with them not only finishing the season with a 22–60 record, but also not even getting the #1 pick that year due to them losing the coin toss to the Milwaukee Bucks (or at least, they would have had they not also traded that draft pick to the Kansas City Kings earlier in the season as well just to help themselves get the payment they need to enter the NBA properly), which forced them to have the #7 pick in the 1977 NBA draft instead due to the Nets trading with fellow ABA-turned-NBA team Indiana Pacers as a means to help each other out since they were both struggling in their own ways during their first seasons out in the NBA.

== ABA Dispersal Draft ==
The New York Nets would be one of four ABA teams to not participate in the 1976 NBA draft, nor would they be able to hold an ABA draft of sorts due to the ABA-NBA merger that was taking place in June 1976. However, they would be able to participate in the 1976 ABA dispersal draft, with the Nets being the last team to select a player in the first round of the dispersal draft. The player they would select in the first round (which later became the penultimate pick of that draft) was Jan van Breda Kolff from the Kentucky Colonels, which they then purchased to have him join their team for $60,000.

== Roster ==
1976–77 New York Nets roster
Players

Pos.	No.	Player	Height	Weight	DOB	From
PG	1	Nate Archibald (injured)	6 ft 1 in (1.85 m)	150 lb (68 kg)	1948-09-02	UTEP
SF	42	Mike Bantom	6 ft 9 in (2.06 m)	200 lb (91 kg)	1951-12-03	Saint Joseph's
PF	21	Tim Bassett	6 ft 8 in (2.03 m)	225 lb (102 kg)	1951-04-01	Georgia
PF	31	Mel Davis	6 ft 6 in (1.98 m)	220 lb (100 kg)	1950-11-09	St. John's
C	40	Jim Fox	6 ft 10 in (2.08 m)	230 lb (104 kg)	1943-04-07	South Carolina
SG	11	Robert Hawkins	6 ft 4 in (1.93 m)	190 lb (86 kg)	1954-06-30	Illinois State
C	35	Kim Hughes	6 ft 11 in (2.11 m)	220 lb (100 kg)	1952-06-04	Wisconsin
SG	30	Al Skinner	6 ft 3 in (1.91 m)	190 lb (86 kg)	1952-06-16	UMass
SF	12	Chuck Terry	6 ft 6 in (1.98 m)	215 lb (98 kg)	1950-09-27	Long Beach State
SF	20	Jan van Breda Kolff	6 ft 7 in (2.01 m)	195 lb (88 kg)	1951-12-16	Vanderbilt
PG	15	Dave Wohl	6 ft 2 in (1.88 m)	185 lb (84 kg)	1949-11-02	Penn

Coaches
Head coach
- Kevin Loughery
Assistant(s)
- Rod Thorn

Legend
- (DP) Unsigned draft pick
- (FA) Free agent
- (S) Suspended
- Injured

Roster
Updated: February 2, 1977

== Regular season ==
In a special $6 million deal, the Nets sold Julius Erving, the ABA's leading scorer, to the Philadelphia 76ers for $3 million. The other $3 million went to Erving, by way of a new contract.

=== Season standings ===
Atlantic Division	W	L	PCT	GB	Home	Road	Div
y-Philadelphia 76ers	50	32	.610	–	32–9	18–23	11–5
x-Boston Celtics	44	38	.537	6	28–13	16–25	9–7
New York Knicks	40	42	.488	10	26–15	14–27	8–8
Buffalo Braves	30	52	.366	20	23–18	7–34	6–10
New York Nets	22	60	.268	28	10–31	12–29	6–10

#	Eastern Conference				
#	Team	W	L	PCT	GB
1	z-Philadelphia 76ers	50	32	.610	–
2	y-Houston Rockets	49	33	.598	1
3	x-Washington Bullets	48	34	.585	2
4	x-Boston Celtics	44	38	.537	6
5	x-San Antonio Spurs	44	38	.537	6
6	x-Cleveland Cavaliers	43	39	.524	7
7	New York Knicks	40	42	.488	10
8	New Orleans Jazz	35	47	.427	15
9	Atlanta Hawks	31	51	.378	19
10	Buffalo Braves	30	52	.366	20
11	New York Nets	22	60	.268	28
