= 1976–77 Philadelphia 76ers season =

NBA professional basketball team season

- Conference champions
- Division champions
- Head coach: Gene Shue
- General manager: Pat Williams
- Arena: The Spectrum

Results
- Record: 50–32 (.610)
- Place: Division: 1st (Atlantic); Conference: 1st (Eastern)
- Playoff finish: NBA Finals (lost to Trail Blazers 2–4)
- Stats at Basketball Reference

Local media
- Television: WKBS-TV; PRISM
- Radio: WCAU

The 1976–77 Philadelphia 76ers season was the 28th season for the Philadelphia 76ers franchise in the NBA. Just months earlier, the American Basketball Association had ended its ninth and final campaign and the two leagues combined. In a special $6 million deal, the Nets traded Julius Erving, the ABA's leading scorer, to the Philadelphia 76ers for $3 million. The other $3 million went to Erving, by way of a new contract. In Philadelphia, Erving joined another scoring machine, George McGinnis, who had come over earlier from the Indiana Pacers. This accumulation of talent brought talk of an immediate championship to Philadelphia.

The talented 76ers had posted the best record in the Eastern Conference with a record of 50–32. Gene Shue was the coach & his key players were Erving (the esteemed Dr. J), McGinnis & 6-foot-6 shooting guard Doug Collins. Other key contributors included point guard Henry Bibby and World B. Free. Caldwell Jones started at center with 20-year-old Darryl Dawkins, also known as "Chocolate Thunder," in a backup role. The reserve forwards were Steve Mix, Harvey Catchings and Joe Bryant. The Sixers beat the Boston Celtics & the Houston Rockets in the Eastern Conference Playoffs, but lost to the Portland Trail Blazers 4–2, after winning the first 2 games.

== Offseason ==
=== NBA draft ===
Round	Pick	Player	Position	Nationality	College
1	12	Terry Furlow	SG/SF	United States	Michigan State
3	47	Ron Norwood	G	United States	DePaul
4	64	Freeman Blade	G	United States	MSU Billings
5	81	Jeff Browne		United States	Missouri Western
6	99	Mike Dunleavy	G	United States	South Carolina
7	117	Phil Walker	SG	United States	Millersville
8	135	Lee Dixon		United States	Hardin-Simmons
9	152	Fly Williams	SG	United States	Austin Peay
10	168	Ed Stefanski		United States	Penn

== Roster ==
Philadelphia 76ers roster
Players

Pos.	No.	Player	Height	Weight	DOB	From
PG	14	Henry Bibby	6 ft 1 in (1.85 m)	185 lb (84 kg)	1949-11-24	UCLA
PF	23	Joe Bryant	6 ft 9 in (2.06 m)	185 lb (84 kg)	1954-10-19	La Salle
C	42	Harvey Catchings	6 ft 10 in (2.08 m)	218 lb (99 kg)	1951-09-02	Hardin–Simmons
SG	20	Doug Collins	6 ft 6 in (1.98 m)	180 lb (82 kg)	1951-07-28	Illinois State
C	53	Darryl Dawkins	6 ft 11 in (2.11 m)	251 lb (114 kg)	1957-01-11	Maynard Evans HS (FL)
PG	10	Mike Dunleavy	6 ft 3 in (1.91 m)	180 lb (82 kg)	1954-03-21	South Carolina
SF	6	Julius Erving	6 ft 7 in (2.01 m)	210 lb (95 kg)	1950-02-22	UMass
SG	21	Lloyd Free	6 ft 2 in (1.88 m)	185 lb (84 kg)	1953-12-09	Guilford
SG	25	Terry Furlow	6 ft 4 in (1.93 m)	190 lb (86 kg)	1954-10-18	Michigan State
C	11	Caldwell Jones	6 ft 11 in (2.11 m)	217 lb (98 kg)	1950-08-04	Albany State
PF	30	George McGinnis	6 ft 8 in (2.03 m)	235 lb (107 kg)	1950-08-12	Indiana
SF	50	Steve Mix	6 ft 7 in (2.01 m)	215 lb (98 kg)	1947-12-30	Toledo

Coaches
Head coach
- Gene Shue

Legend
- (DP) Unsigned draft pick
- (FA) Free agent
- (S) Suspended
- Injured

== Regular season ==
=== Season standings ===
Atlantic Division	W	L	PCT	GB	Home	Road	Div
y-Philadelphia 76ers	50	32	.610	–	32–9	18–23	11–5
x-Boston Celtics	44	38	.537	6	28–13	16–25	9–7
New York Knicks	40	42	.488	10	26–15	14–27	8–8
Buffalo Braves	30	52	.366	20	23–18	7–34	6–10
New York Nets	22	60	.268	28	10–31	12–29	6–10

#	Eastern Conference				
#	Team	W	L	PCT	GB
1	z-Philadelphia 76ers	50	32	.610	–
2	y-Houston Rockets	49	33	.598	1
3	x-Washington Bullets	48	34	.585	2
4	x-Boston Celtics	44	38	.537	6
5	x-San Antonio Spurs	44	38	.537	6
6	x-Cleveland Cavaliers	43	39	.524	7
7	New York Knicks	40	42	.488	10
8	New Orleans Jazz	35	47	.427	15
9	Atlanta Hawks	31	51	.378	19
10	Buffalo Braves	30	52	.366	20
11	New York Nets	22	60	.268	28

=== Season schedule ===
==== October ====
Date	Opponent	Score	Result	Record	Streak
Fri, Oct 22, 1976	San Antonio Spurs	118–121	Loss	0–1	Lost 1
Sat, Oct 23, 1976	@ Buffalo Braves	105–108	Loss	0–2	Lost 2
Tue, Oct 26, 1976	@ New Orleans Jazz	111–101	Win	1–2	Lost 1

== Playoffs ==
1977 playoff game log
Conference semifinals: 4–3 (home: 3–1; road: 1–2)

Game	Date	Team	Score	High points	High rebounds	High assists	Location Attendance	Series
1	April 17	Boston	L 111–113	Julius Erving (36)	Caldwell Jones (11)	Collins, Erving (5)	Spectrum; 13,821	0–1
2	April 20	Boston	W 113–101	Julius Erving (30)	George McGinnis (13)	Doug Collins (7)	Spectrum; 18,276	1–1
3	April 22	@ Boston	W 109–100	Julius Erving (27)	McGinnis, Jones (15)	George McGinnis (5)	Boston Garden; 15,040	2–1
4	April 24	@ Boston	L 119–124	Doug Collins (36)	George McGinnis (9)	Doug Collins (5)	Boston Garden; 15,040	2–2
5	April 27	Boston	W 110–91	Doug Collins (23)	McGinnis, Jones (11)	Doug Collins (6)	Spectrum; 18,276	3–2
6	April 29	@ Boston	L 108–113	Doug Collins (32)	George McGinnis (14)	George McGinnis (5)	Boston Garden; 15,040	3–3
7	May 1	Boston	W 83–77	World B. Free (27)	George McGinnis (12)	McGinnis, Mix (4)	Spectrum; 18,276	4–3

Conference finals: 4–2 (home: 2–1; road: 2–1)

Game	Date	Team	Score	High points	High rebounds	High assists	Location Attendance	Series
1	May 5	Houston	W 128–117	Julius Erving (24)	George McGinnis (13)	Doug Collins (8)	Spectrum; 17,507	1–0
2	May 8	Houston	W 106–97	George McGinnis (21)	George McGinnis (8)	Julius Erving (10)	Spectrum; 14,855	2–0
3	May 11	@ Houston	L 94–118	Julius Erving (28)	George McGinnis (9)	Doug Collins (7)	The Summit; 15,676	2–1
4	May 13	@ Houston	W 107–95	Doug Collins (36)	Caldwell Jones (11)	George McGinnis (9)	The Summit; 15,676	3–1
5	May 15	Houston	L 115–118	Julius Erving (37)	George McGinnis (14)	Henry Bibby (8)	Spectrum; 18,276	3–2
6	May 17	@ Houston	W 112–109	Julius Erving (34)	Julius Erving (9)	Julius Erving (6)	The Summit; 15,676	4–2

NBA Finals: 2–4 (home: 2–1; road: 0–3)

Game	Date	Team	Score	High points	High rebounds	High assists	Location Attendance	Series
1	May 22	Portland	W 107–101	Julius Erving (33)	Caldwell Jones (11)	Doug Collins (6)	Spectrum; 18,276	1–0
2	May 26	Portland	W 107–89	Doug Collins (27)	Caldwell Jones (14)	Henry Bibby (11)	Spectrum; 18,276	2–0
3	May 29	@ Portland	L 107–129	Julius Erving (28)	George McGinnis (12)	Julius Erving (5)	Memorial Coliseum; 12,923	2–1
4	May 31	@ Portland	L 98–130	Julius Erving (24)	Darryl Dawkins (11)	Steve Mix (4)	Memorial Coliseum; 12,913	2–2
5	June 3	Portland	L 104–110	Julius Erving (37)	Caldwell Jones (13)	Julius Erving (7)	Spectrum; 18,276	2–3
6	June 5	@ Portland	L 107–109	Julius Erving (40)	George McGinnis (16)	Julius Erving (8)	Memorial Coliseum; 12,951	2–4

1977 schedule

== Awards and honors ==
- Julius Erving, NBA All-Star Game Most Valuable Player Award
- George McGinnis, All-NBA Second Team
- Julius Erving, All-NBA Second Team
