= Atlantic Division (NBA) =

Division in the Eastern Conference of the National Basketball Association

- Conference: Eastern Conference
- League: National Basketball Association
- Sport: Basketball
- First season: 1970–71 season
- No. of teams: 5
- Most recent champions: Boston Celtics (26th title) (2025–26)
- Most titles: Boston Celtics (26 titles)

Atlantic Division Teams Location

The Atlantic Division is one of the three divisions in the Eastern Conference of the National Basketball Association (NBA). The division consists of five teams, the Boston Celtics, the Brooklyn Nets, the New York Knicks, the Philadelphia 76ers, and the Toronto Raptors. All teams, except the Raptors are located on the East Coast of the United States. However, Toronto sports teams have over the years enjoyed rivalries with teams in the Northeastern United States (particularly, Toronto teams also share divisions with Boston and New York teams in Major League Baseball and the National Hockey League).

The division was created at the start of the 1970–71 season, when the league expanded from 14 to 17 teams with the addition of the Buffalo Braves, the Cleveland Cavaliers and the Portland Trail Blazers. The league realigned itself into two conferences, the Western Conference and the Eastern Conference, with two divisions in each conference. The Atlantic Division began with four inaugural members, the Celtics, the Braves, the Knicks and the 76ers. The Celtics, the Knicks and the 76ers all joined from the Eastern Division.

The Celtics have won the most Atlantic Division titles with 26. Twelve NBA champions have come from the Atlantic Division. The Celtics have won seven NBA championships while in the Division, while the Knicks have won three championships, and the 76ers and the Raptors have won one championship each. All of them, except the 1972–73 and 2025–26 Knicks, were division champions. In the 1983–84 season, all five teams from the division qualified for the playoffs. In the 1982–83 season, all teams in the division had winning percentages above 0.500 (50%).

Since the 2021–22 season, the Atlantic Division champion has received the Nat "Sweetwater" Clifton Trophy, named after Hall of Famer Nathaniel Clifton.

== 2026–27 standings ==
Atlantic Division	W	L	PCT	GB	Home	Road	Div	GP
Philadelphia 76ers	3	1	.750	–	2‍–‍1	1‍–‍0	1–0	4
Boston Celtics	3	1	.750	–	3‍–‍0	0‍–‍1	2–0	4
Toronto Raptors	2	1	.667	0.5	1‍–‍0	1‍–‍1	0–0	3
New York Knicks	1	3	.250	2.0	1‍–‍2	0‍–‍1	0–2	4
Brooklyn Nets	0	4	.000	3.0	0‍–‍2	0‍–‍2	0–1	4

== Teams ==
Team	City	Year	From
Team	City	Joined	
Boston Celtics	Boston, Massachusetts	1970	Eastern Division
Brooklyn Nets (2012–present); New Jersey Nets (1977–2012); New York Nets (1976–1977)	Brooklyn, New York; Piscataway/East Rutherford/Newark, New Jersey; Uniondale, New York	1976	ABA‡
New York Knicks	New York City, New York	1970	Eastern Division
Philadelphia 76ers	Philadelphia, Pennsylvania	1970	Eastern Division
Toronto Raptors	Toronto, Ontario	2004	Central Division

Notes

- ‡ denotes a team that merged from the American Basketball Association (ABA).

=== Former teams ===
Team	City	Year	From	Year	To	Current division
Team	City	Joined		Left		Current division
Buffalo Braves (now the Los Angeles Clippers)	Buffalo, New York	1970	—†	1978	Pacific Division (as San Diego Clippers)	Pacific Division
Charlotte Hornets	Charlotte, North Carolina	1988	—†	1989	Midwest Division	Southeast Division
Miami Heat	Miami, Florida	1989	Midwest Division	2004	Southeast Division	Southeast Division
Orlando Magic	Orlando, Florida	1991	Midwest Division	2004	Southeast Division	Southeast Division
Washington Wizards (1997–present); Washington Bullets (1974–1997)	Washington, D.C.	1978	Central Division	2004	Southeast Division	Southeast Division

Notes

- † denotes an expansion team.

=== Team Timeline ===
Denotes team that is currently in the division
Denotes team that has left the division

== Nat "Sweetwater" Clifton Trophy ==
Beginning with the 2021–22 season, the Atlantic Division champion has received the Nat "Sweetwater" Clifton Trophy. As with the other division championship trophies, it is named after one of the African American pioneers from NBA history. Nathaniel Clifton was one of the first African American players to sign an NBA contract when he joined the New York Knicks in 1950. The Clifton Trophy consists of a 200-millimetre (7.9 in) crystal ball.

== Division champions ==
^	Had or tied for the best regular season record for that season

Season	Team	Record	Playoffs result
1970–71	New York Knicks	52–30 (.634)	Lost conference finals
1971–72	Boston Celtics	56–26 (.683)	Lost conference finals
1972–73	Boston Celtics^	68–14 (.829)	Lost conference finals
1973–74	Boston Celtics	56–26 (.683)	Won NBA Finals
1974–75	Boston Celtics^	60–22 (.732)	Lost conference finals
1975–76	Boston Celtics	54–28 (.659)	Won NBA Finals
1976–77	Philadelphia 76ers	50–32 (.610)	Lost NBA Finals
1977–78	Philadelphia 76ers	55–27 (.671)	Lost conference finals
1978–79	Washington Bullets^	54–28 (.659)	Lost NBA Finals
1979–80	Boston Celtics^	61–21 (.744)	Lost conference finals
1980–81	Boston Celtics^	62–20 (.756)	Won NBA Finals
1981–82	Boston Celtics^	63–19 (.768)	Lost conference finals
1982–83	Philadelphia 76ers^	65–17 (.793)	Won NBA Finals
1983–84	Boston Celtics^	62–20 (.756)	Won NBA Finals
1984–85	Boston Celtics^	63–19 (.768)	Lost NBA Finals
1985–86	Boston Celtics^	67–15 (.817)	Won NBA Finals
1986–87	Boston Celtics	59–23 (.720)	Lost NBA Finals
1987–88	Boston Celtics	57–25 (.695)	Lost conference finals
1988–89	New York Knicks	52–30 (.634)	Lost conference semifinals
1989–90	Philadelphia 76ers	53–29 (.646)	Lost conference semifinals
1990–91	Boston Celtics	56–26 (.683)	Lost conference semifinals
1991–92	Boston Celtics	51–31 (.622)	Lost conference semifinals
1992–93	New York Knicks	60–22 (.732)	Lost conference finals
1993–94	New York Knicks	57–25 (.695)	Lost NBA Finals
1994–95	Orlando Magic	57–25 (.695)	Lost NBA Finals
1995–96	Orlando Magic	60–22 (.732)	Lost conference finals
1996–97	Miami Heat	61–21 (.744)	Lost conference finals
1997–98	Miami Heat	55–27 (.671)	Lost first round
1998–99^{[a]}	Miami Heat	33–17 (.660)	Lost first round
1999–00	Miami Heat	52–30 (.634)	Lost conference semifinals
2000–01	Philadelphia 76ers	56–26 (.683)	Lost NBA Finals
2001–02	New Jersey Nets	52–30 (.634)	Lost NBA Finals
2002–03	New Jersey Nets	49–33 (.598)	Lost NBA Finals
2003–04	New Jersey Nets	47–35 (.573)	Lost conference semifinals
2004–05	Boston Celtics	45–37 (.549)	Lost first round
2005–06	New Jersey Nets	49–33 (.598)	Lost conference semifinals
2006–07	Toronto Raptors	47–35 (.573)	Lost first round
2007–08	Boston Celtics^	66–16 (.805)	Won NBA Finals
2008–09	Boston Celtics	62–20 (.756)	Lost conference semifinals
2009–10	Boston Celtics	50–32 (.610)	Lost NBA Finals
2010–11	Boston Celtics	56–26 (.683)	Lost conference semifinals
2011–12^{[b]}	Boston Celtics	39–27 (.591)	Lost conference finals
2012–13	New York Knicks	54–28 (.659)	Lost conference semifinals
2013–14	Toronto Raptors	48–34 (.585)	Lost first round
2014–15	Toronto Raptors	49–33 (.598)	Lost first round
2015–16	Toronto Raptors	56–26 (.683)	Lost conference finals
2016–17	Boston Celtics	53–29 (.646)	Lost conference finals
2017–18	Toronto Raptors	59–23 (.720)	Lost conference semifinals
2018–19	Toronto Raptors	58–24 (.707)	Won NBA Finals
2019–20	Toronto Raptors	53–19 (.736)	Lost conference semifinals
2020–21	Philadelphia 76ers	49–23 (.681)	Lost conference semifinals
2021–22	Boston Celtics	51–31 (.622)	Lost NBA Finals
2022–23	Boston Celtics	57–25 (.695)	Lost conference finals
2023–24	Boston Celtics^	64–18 (.780)	Won NBA Finals
2024–25	Boston Celtics	61–21 (.744)	Lost conference semifinals
2025–26	Boston Celtics	56–26 (.683)	Lost first round

=== Titles by team ===
^	Denotes team that has left the division

Team	Titles	Season(s) won
Boston Celtics	27	1971–72, 1972–73, 1973–74, 1974–75, 1975–76, 1979–80, 1980–81, 1981–82, 1983–84, 1984–85, 1985–86, 1986–87, 1987–88, 1990–91, 1991–92, 2004–05, 2007–08, 2008–09, 2009–10, 2010–11, 2011–12, 2016–17, 2021–22, 2022–23, 2023–24, 2024–25, 2025–26
Toronto Raptors	7	2006–07, 2013–14, 2014–15, 2015–16, 2017–18, 2018–19, 2019–20
Philadelphia 76ers	6	1976–77, 1977–78, 1982–83, 1989–90, 2000–01, 2020–21
New York Knicks	5	1970–71, 1988–89, 1992–93, 1993–94, 2012–13
Brooklyn Nets	4	2001–02, 2002–03, 2003–04, 2005–06
Miami Heat^	4	1996–97, 1997–98, 1998–99, 1999–00
Orlando Magic^	2	1994–95, 1995–96
Washington Bullets^ (now Washington Wizards)	1	1978–79

== Season results ==
^	Denotes team that won the NBA Finals
^{+}	Denotes team that won the Conference finals, but lost the NBA Finals
*	Denotes team that qualified for the NBA Playoffs
×	Denotes team that qualified for the NBA play-in tournament

†	Denotes team that did not qualify for the 2020 NBA Bubble season restart

Season	Team (record)						
Season	1st	2nd	3rd	4th	5th	6th	7th
1970: The Atlantic Division was formed with four inaugural members. An expansion team, the Buffalo Braves, joined the division. The Boston Celtics, the New York Knicks and the Philadelphia 76ers joined from the Eastern Division.
1970–71	New York* (52–30)	Philadelphia* (47–35)	Boston (44–38)	Buffalo (22–60)			
1971–72	Boston* (56–26)	New York^{+} (48–34)	Philadelphia (30–52)	Buffalo (22–60)			
1972–73	Boston* (68–14)	New York^ (57–25)	Buffalo (21–61)	Philadelphia (9–73)			
1973–74	Boston^ (56–26)	New York* (49–33)	Buffalo* (42–40)	Philadelphia (25–57)			
1974–75	Boston* (60–22)	Buffalo* (49–33)	New York* (40–42)	Philadelphia (34–48)			
1975–76	Boston^ (54–28)	Philadelphia* (46–36)	Buffalo* (46–36)	New York (38–44)			
1976: An American Basketball Association (ABA) team that merged with the NBA, the New York Nets, joined the division.
1976–77	Philadelphia^{+} (50–32)	Boston* (44–38)	NY Knicks (40–42)	Buffalo (30–52)	NY Nets (22–60)		
1977: The New York Nets relocated and became the New Jersey Nets.
1977–78	Philadelphia* (55–27)	New York* (43–39)	Boston (32–50)	Buffalo (27–55)	New Jersey (24–58)		
1978: The Washington Bullets joined from the Central Division. The Buffalo Braves, who relocated and became the San Diego Clippers, left to join the Pacific Division.
1978–79	Washington^{+} (54–28)	Philadelphia* (47–35)	New Jersey* (37–45)	New York (31–51)	Boston (29–53)		
1979–80	Boston* (61–21)	Philadelphia^{+} (59–23)	Washington* (39–43)	New York (39–43)	New Jersey (34–48)		
1980–81	Boston^ (62–20)	Philadelphia* (62–20)	New York* (50–32)	Washington (39–43)	New Jersey (24–58)		
1981–82	Boston* (63–19)	Philadelphia^{+} (58–24)	New Jersey* (44–38)	Washington* (43–39)	New York (33–49)		
1982–83	Philadelphia^ (65–17)	Boston* (56–26)	New Jersey* (49–33)	New York* (44–38)	Washington (42–40)		
1983–84	Boston^ (62–20)	Philadelphia* (52–30)	New York* (47–35)	New Jersey* (45–37)	Washington* (35–47)		
1984–85	Boston^{+} (63–19)	Philadelphia* (58–24)	New Jersey* (42–40)	Washington* (40–42)	New York (24–58)		
1985–86	Boston^ (67–15)	Philadelphia* (54–28)	Washington* (39–43)	New Jersey* (39–43)	New York (23–59)		
1986–87	Boston^{+} (59–23)	Philadelphia* (45–37)	Washington* (42–40)	New Jersey (24–58)	New York (24–58)		
1987–88	Boston* (57–25)	Washington* (38–44)	New York* (38–44)	Philadelphia (36–46)	New Jersey (19–63)		
1988: An expansion team, the Charlotte Hornets, joined the division temporarily for one season.
1988–89	New York* (52–30)	Philadelphia* (46–36)	Boston* (42–40)	Washington (40–42)	New Jersey (26–56)	Charlotte (20–62)	
1989: The Miami Heat joined from the Midwest Division. The Charlotte Hornets left to join the Midwest Division temporarily for one season, then the Central Division permanently thereafter.
1989–90	Philadelphia* (53–29)	Boston* (52–30)	New York* (45–37)	Washington (31–51)	Miami (18–64)	New Jersey (17–65)	
1990–91	Boston* (56–26)	Philadelphia* (44–38)	New York* (39–43)	Washington (30–52)	New Jersey (26–56)	Miami (24–58)	
1991: The Orlando Magic joined from the Midwest Division.
1991–92	Boston* (51–31)	New York* (51–31)	New Jersey* (40–42)	Miami* (38–44)	Philadelphia (35–47)	Washington (25–57)	Orlando (21–61)
1992–93	New York* (60–22)	Boston* (48–34)	New Jersey* (43–39)	Orlando (41–41)	Miami (36–46)	Philadelphia (26–56)	Washington (22–60)
1993–94	New York^{+} (57–25)	Orlando* (50–32)	New Jersey* (45–37)	Miami* (42–40)	Boston (32–50)	Philadelphia (25–57)	Washington (24–58)
1994–95	Orlando^{+} (57–25)	New York* (55–27)	Boston* (35–47)	Miami (32–50)	New Jersey (30–52)	Philadelphia (24–58)	Washington (21–61)
1995–96	Orlando* (60–22)	New York* (47–35)	Miami* (42–40)	Washington (39–43)	Boston (33–49)	New Jersey (30–52)	Philadelphia (18–64)
1996–97	Miami* (61–21)	New York* (57–25)	Orlando* (45–37)	Washington* (44–38)	New Jersey (26–56)	Philadelphia (22–60)	Boston (15–67)
1997: The Washington Bullets was renamed the Washington Wizards.
1997–98	Miami* (55–27)	New York* (43–39)	New Jersey* (43–39)	Washington (42–40)	Orlando (41–41)	Boston (36–46)	Philadelphia (31–51)
1998–99^{[a]}	Miami* (33–17)	Orlando* (33–17)	Philadelphia* (28–22)	New York^{+} (27–23)	Boston (19–31)	Washington (18–32)	New Jersey (16–34)
1999–00	Miami* (52–30)	New York* (50–32)	Philadelphia* (49–33)	Orlando (41–41)	Boston (35–47)	New Jersey (31–51)	Washington (29–53)
2000–01	Philadelphia^{+} (56–26)	Miami* (50–32)	New York* (48–34)	Orlando* (43–39)	Boston (36–46)	New Jersey (26–56)	Washington (19–63)
2001–02	New Jersey^{+} (52–30)	Boston* (49–33)	Orlando* (44–38)	Philadelphia* (43–39)	Washington (37–45)	Miami (36–46)	New York (30–52)
2002–03	New Jersey^{+} (49–33)	Philadelphia* (48–34)	Boston* (44–38)	Orlando* (42–40)	Washington (37–45)	New York (37–45)	Miami (25–57)
2003–04	New Jersey* (47–35)	Miami* (42–40)	New York* (39–43)	Boston* (36–46)	Philadelphia (33–49)	Washington (25–57)	Orlando (21–61)
2004: The Toronto Raptors joined from the Central Division. The Miami Heat, the Orlando Magic and the Washington Wizards left to join the Southeast Division.
2004–05	Boston* (45–37)	Philadelphia* (43–39)	New Jersey* (42–40)	Toronto (33–49)	New York (33–49)		
2005–06	New Jersey* (49–33)	Philadelphia (38–44)	Boston (33–49)	Toronto (27–55)	New York (23–59)		
2006–07	Toronto* (47–35)	New Jersey* (41–41)	Philadelphia (35–47)	New York (33–49)	Boston (24–58)		
2007–08	Boston^ (66–16)	Toronto* (41–41)	Philadelphia* (40–42)	New Jersey (34–48)	New York (23–59)		
2008–09	Boston* (62–20)	Philadelphia* (41–41)	New Jersey (34–48)	Toronto (33–49)	New York (32–50)		
2009–10	Boston^{+} (50–32)	Toronto (40–42)	New York (29–53)	Philadelphia (27–55)	New Jersey (12–70)		
2010–11	Boston* (56–26)	New York* (42–40)	Philadelphia* (41–41)	New Jersey (24–58)	Toronto (22–60)		
2011–12^{[b]}	Boston* (39–27)	New York* (36–30)	Philadelphia* (35–31)	Toronto (23–43)	New Jersey (22–44)		
2012: The New Jersey Nets relocated and became the Brooklyn Nets.
2012–13	New York* (54–28)	Brooklyn* (49–33)	Boston* (41–40)	Philadelphia (34–48)	Toronto (34–48)		
2013–14	Toronto* (48–34)	Brooklyn* (44–38)	New York (37–45)	Boston (25–57)	Philadelphia (19–63)		
2014–15	Toronto* (49–33)	Boston* (40–42)	Brooklyn* (38–44)	Philadelphia (18–64)	New York (17–65)		
2015–16	Toronto* (56–26)	Boston* (48–34)	New York (32–50)	Brooklyn (21–61)	Philadelphia (10–72)		
2016–17	Boston* (53–29)	Toronto* (51–31)	New York (31–51)	Philadelphia (28–54)	Brooklyn (20–62)		
2017–18	Toronto* (59–23)	Boston* (55–27)	Philadelphia* (52–30)	New York (29–53)	Brooklyn (28–54)		
2018–19	Toronto^ (58–24)	Philadelphia* (51–31)	Boston* (49–33)	Brooklyn* (42–40)	New York (17–65)		
2019–20	Toronto* (53–19)	Boston* (48–24)	Philadelphia* (43–30)	Brooklyn* (35–37)	New York† (21–45)		
2020–21	Philadelphia* (49–23)	Brooklyn* (48–24)	New York* (41–31)	Boston* (36–36)	Toronto (27–45)		
2021–22	Boston^{+} (51–31)	Philadelphia* (51–31)	Toronto* (48–34)	Brooklyn* (44–38)	New York (37–45)		
2022–23	Boston* (57–25)	Philadelphia* (54–28)	New York* (47–35)	Brooklyn* (45–37)	Toronto× (41–41)		
2023–24	Boston^ (64–18)	New York* (50–32)	Philadelphia* (47–35)	Brooklyn (32–50)	Toronto (25–57)		
2024–25	Boston* (61–21)	New York* (51–31)	Toronto (30–52)	Brooklyn (26–56)	Philadelphia (24–58)		
2025–26	Boston* (56–26)	New York^ (53–29)	Toronto* (46–36)	Philadelphia* (45–37)	Brooklyn (20–62)		

== See also ==
- Central Division (NBA)
- Pacific Division (NBA)
- Southwest Division (NBA)
- Midwest Division (NBA)

== Notes ==
- ^{a 1} ^{2} Because of a lockout, the season did not start until February 5, 1999, and all 29 teams played a shortened 50-game regular season schedule.
- ^{b 1} ^{2} Because of a lockout, the season did not start until December 25, 2011, and all 30 teams played a shortened 66-game regular season schedule.
- †In the aftermath of the Boston Marathon bombing, the NBA canceled the April 16 game scheduled in Boston between the Celtics and the Pacers; the game was not rescheduled because it would have had no impact on either team's playoff seedings.
