= Norm Cook =

American basketball player (1955–2008)

Personal information
- Born: March 21, 1955 Chicago, Illinois, U.S.
- Died: December 22, 2008 (aged 53) Lincoln, Illinois, U.S.
- Listed height: 6 ft 8 in (2.03 m)
- Listed weight: 210 lb (95 kg)

Career information
- High school: Lincoln (Lincoln, Illinois)
- College: Kansas (1973–1976)
- NBA draft: 1976: 1st round, 16th overall pick
- Drafted by: Boston Celtics
- Playing career: 1976–1980
- Position: Small forward
- Number: 52, 30

Career history
- 1976–1977: Boston Celtics
- 1978: Denver Nuggets
- 1979–1980: Basketball Oud-Beijerland

Career highlights
- First-team All-Big Eight (1976)
- Stats at NBA.com
- Stats at Basketball Reference
Medals
Representing United States
Men's basketball
Pan American Games
Gold medal – first place	1975 Mexico City	Team competition

Norman Cook (March 21, 1955 – December 22, 2008) was an American professional basketball player.

A 6'8" forward from Lincoln Community High School in Lincoln, Illinois, Cook played basketball at the University of Kansas from 1973 to 1976. He was named the Big Eight Conference's Freshman of the Year in 1974 after averaging 11.4 points per game and helping the Kansas Jayhawks reach the NCAA Final Four. Cook left the University of Kansas after his junior season to make himself eligible for the 1976 NBA draft, where he was selected by the Boston Celtics. He appeared in 27 games over two seasons with the Celtics and Denver Nuggets, averaging 2.4 points per game.

Cook was haunted by bouts of mental illness. Cook's son, Brian Cook, has played for several NBA teams.

== Career statistics ==
Legend
GP	Games played	GS	Games started	MPG	Minutes per game
FG%	Field goal percentage	3P%	3-point field goal percentage	FT%	Free throw percentage
RPG	Rebounds per game	APG	Assists per game	SPG	Steals per game
BPG	Blocks per game	PPG	Points per game	**Bold**	Career high

=== NBA ===
==== Regular season ====
Year	Team	GP	MPG	FG%	FT%	RPG	APG	SPG	BPG	PPG
1976–77	Boston	**25**	**5.5**	**.375**	**.529**	1.1	.2	**.4**	**.1**	**2.5**
1977–78	Denver	2	5.0	.333	–	**1.5**	**.5**	.0	.0	1.0
Career		27	5.5	.373	.529	1.1	.2	.4	.1	2.4

==== Playoffs ====
Year	Team	GP	MPG	FG%	FT%	RPG	APG	SPG	BPG	PPG
1977	Boston	1	3.0	1.000	–	.0	.0	.0	.0	4.0
