= Tom McMillen =

American basketball player and politician (born 1952)

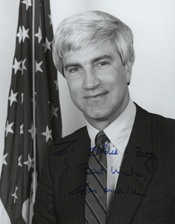

Chair of the President's Council on Physical Fitness and Sports
- In office 1993–1997 Serving with Florence Griffith Joyner
- President: Bill Clinton
- Preceded by: Arnold Schwarzenegger
- Succeeded by: Lee Haney

Member of the U.S. House of Representatives from Maryland's 4th district
- In office January 3, 1987 – January 3, 1993
- Preceded by: Marjorie Holt
- Succeeded by: Al Wynn

Personal details
- Born: Charles Thomas McMillen; May 26, 1952 (age 74) Elmira, New York, U.S.
- Party: Democratic
- Education: University of Maryland, College Park (BS); University College, Oxford (BA)
- Basketball career

Personal information
- Listed height: 6 ft 11 in (2.11 m)
- Listed weight: 215 lb (98 kg)

Career information
- High school: Mansfield (Mansfield, Pennsylvania)
- College: Maryland (1971–1974)
- NBA draft: 1974: 1st round, 9th overall pick
- Drafted by: Buffalo Braves
- Playing career: 1974–1986
- Position: Power forward / center
- Number: 52, 54

Career history
- 1974–1975: Virtus Bologna
- 1975–1976: Buffalo Braves
- 1976–1977: New York Knicks
- 1977–1983: Atlanta Hawks
- 1983–1986: Washington Bullets

Career highlights
- Consensus second-team All-American (1973); Second-team All-American – NABC, UPI (1974); 2× Third-team All-American – AP (1972, 1974); Third-team All-American – UPI (1972); 2× First-team All-ACC (1972, 1973); Second-team All-ACC (1974); Mr. Basketball USA (1970); 2× First-team Parade All-American (1969, 1970)

Career NBA statistics
- Points: 5,914 (8.1 ppg)
- Rebounds: 2,913 (4.0 rpg)
- Assists: 788 (1.1 apg)
- Stats at NBA.com
- Stats at Basketball Reference
- Collegiate Basketball Hall of Fame
Medals
Men's basketball
Representing United States
Olympic Games
Silver medal – second place	1972 Munich	Team

Charles Thomas McMillen (born May 26, 1952) is an American politician, businessman, and former professional basketball player. A Rhodes Scholar, McMillen represented Maryland's 4th congressional district from 1987 to 1993. He played in the National Basketball Association for the Buffalo Braves, New York Knicks, Atlanta Hawks (mostly), and Washington Bullets from 1975 until 1985.

On March 22, 2011, he was appointed as chairman of the inaugural Board of Directors of the President's Foundation on Sports, Physical Fitness, and Nutrition. He is also the author of Out of Bounds, a critical look at the unhealthy influence of sports on ethics, and he served on the Knight Foundation's Commission on Intercollegiate Athletics investigating abuses within college sports.

== Career ==
=== Basketball ===
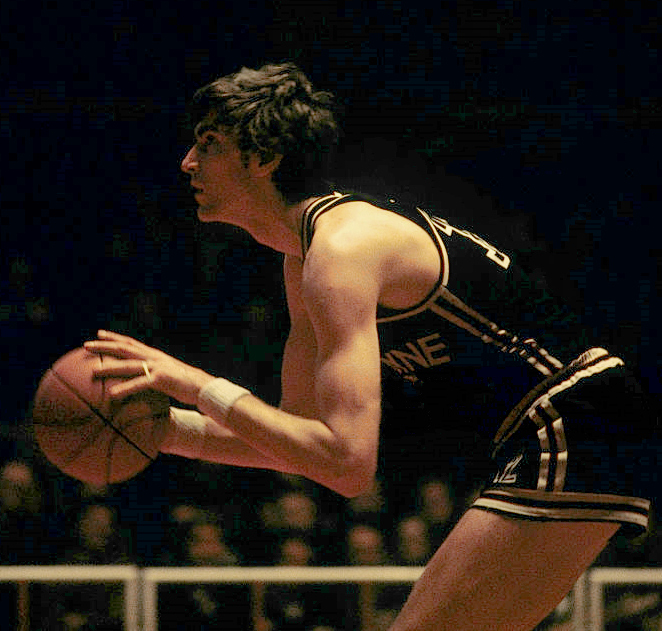
McMillen playing for Virtus in Italy, 1975

Prior to entering politics, McMillen was a star basketball player on all levels. In 1970, he was the number one high school basketball player in the country coming out of Mansfield, Pennsylvania, and was the biggest recruiting catch early in coach Lefty Driesell's career at the University of Maryland, beating out rival coaches Dean Smith of the University of North Carolina and John Wooden of University of California, Los Angeles for McMillen's services. McMillen played for the Terrapins from 1971 to 1974. He was also a member of the 1972 U.S. Olympic basketball team that lost a controversial gold medal game to the Soviet Union.

McMillen earned his B.S. from University of Maryland in chemistry, which is part of the University of Maryland College of Computer, Mathematical, and Natural Sciences. After graduating from Maryland in 1974, McMillen was drafted with the ninth pick in the first round of the 1974 NBA draft by the Buffalo Braves and the first round of the 1974 ABA draft by the Virginia Squires. McMillen signed with the Braves but postponed his entry into the NBA in order to attend University College, Oxford as a Rhodes Scholar. During his time at Oxford, McMillen was a member of the Oxford University basketball team. He also commuted to Bologna, to play for Italian club Virtus Bologna. During his eleven-year National Basketball Association career, he played for the Braves, New York Knicks, Atlanta Hawks, and Washington Bullets, before he retired in 1986 to pursue his political career.

=== U.S. House ===
He was elected to the United States Congress as a Democrat to represent Maryland's 4th district, and served from 1987 to 1993 as that district's representative. Future president Donald Trump donated to McMillen's first Congressional campaign.

In 1992, the 4th was redrawn as a black-majority district due to a mandate from the Justice Department. His home in Crofton was drawn into the Eastern Shore-based 1st district, represented by first-term Republican Congressman Wayne Gilchrest. Although McMillen did very well in the more urbanized areas of the district near Baltimore and Washington, D.C., it was not enough to overcome Gilchrest's margin on the Eastern Shore, and McMillen lost his reelection bid.

McMillen is thought to be the tallest-ever member of Congress. At 6 feet 11 inches, he is two feet taller than Maryland Senator Barbara Mikulski, who is believed to be the shortest representative ever.

=== Later career ===
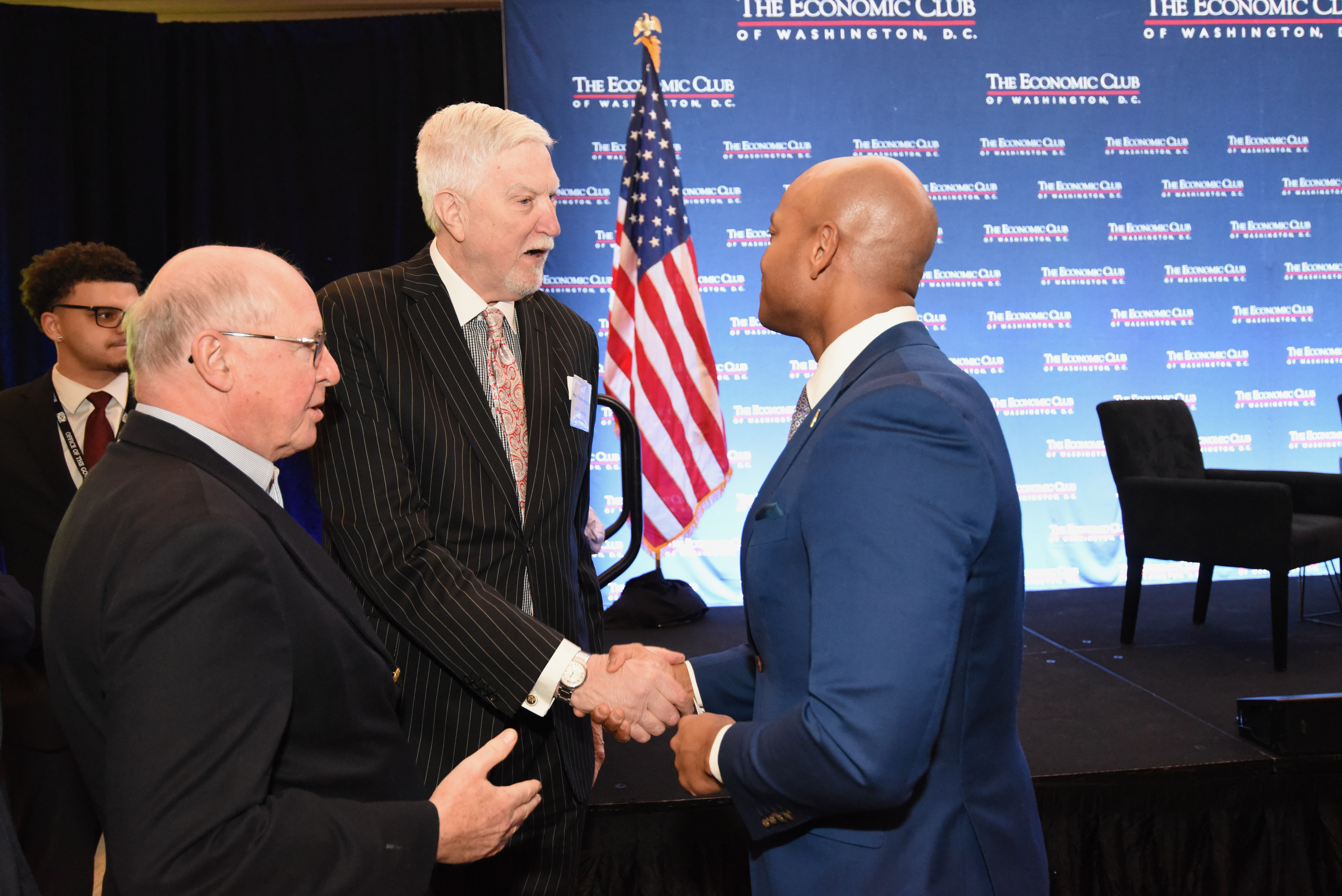
McMillen shakes hands with Maryland Governor Wes Moore, 2024

President Bill Clinton named McMillen to be the chair of the President's Council on Physical Fitness and Sports; he resigned in November 1997 after the FBI raided a separate healthcare business he was running. No prosecution was ever brought as part of the raid. McMillen was appointed to the University System of Maryland's Board of Regents in 2007, where he served until June 30, 2015. He was replaced by Robert R. Neall whom McMillen had defeated for Congress in 1986. In March 2023, McMillen was again appointed to the Boards of Regents, succeeding Gary L. Attman.

In September 2015, McMillen was selected to lead the Division I-A Athletic Directors' Association as it moved from Dallas to Washington, D.C. He remains President and Chief Executive Officer of the renamed Lead1 Association, now advocating for athletic directors at Football Bowl Subdivision universities.

== Personal life ==
McMillen is married to Dr. Judith Niemyer. The couple have lived in Fauquier County, Virginia since 2010.

In 1992, McMillen attended an NFL-related party hosted by Donald Trump, and happened to enter the party with his girlfriend at the same time as Jeffrey Epstein, which was caught on tape by NBC cameras. McMillen was also filmed talking with Ghislaine Maxwell; in 2025, he said that he was just saying hello to people as he walked through the party. McMillen's name is listed in the Epstein flight logs for a date two months after the party, though he said in 2025 that the logs are false. In a statement to Pablo Torre Finds Out, McMillen said that he did not have a close relationship with Epstein, nor would he have considered him a friend.

In an email that was later released to the public by Congress, Gwendolyn Beck reached out to Epstein, claiming that McMillen had wanted to be reintroduced to him to help raise money so McMillen could receive an ambassadorship from the Obama administration. McMillen also said he did not remember making that ask, that he would not have mentioned Epstein nor was he looking to receive an ambassadorship since he had been a supporter of Hillary Clinton's campaign.

== Career statistics ==
Legend
GP	Games played	GS	Games started	MPG	Minutes per game
FG%	Field goal percentage	3P%	3-point field goal percentage	FT%	Free throw percentage
RPG	Rebounds per game	APG	Assists per game	SPG	Steals per game
BPG	Blocks per game	PPG	Points per game	**Bold**	Career high
*	Led the league

=== NBA ===
==== Regular season ====
Year	Team	GP	GS	MPG	FG%	3P%	FT%	RPG	APG	SPG	BPG	PPG
1975–76	Buffalo	50		14.2	.432		.759	3.7	1.4	.1	.1	4.7
1976–77	Buffalo	20		13.5	.489		.722	3.6	.8	.1	.1	5.8
1976–77	New York	56	22	21.8	.486		.805	5.7	.9	.2	.1	9.4
1977–78	Atlanta	68		**24.8**	.493		.800	**6.1**	1.2	.5	.2	**9.9**
1978–79	Atlanta	**82***		17.0	.466		**.891**	4.0	.8	.2	**.4**	7.0
1979–80	Atlanta	53		20.2	.500	.000	.757	4.2	1.2	**.7**	.3	8.7
1980–81	Atlanta	79		19.8	.487	.167	.741	3.7	.9	.3	.3	7.4
1981–82	Atlanta	73	**23**	24.5	**.509**	**.333**	.824	4.6	**1.8**	.3	.3	**9.9**
1982–83	Atlanta	61	4	22.4	.467	.000	.812	3.6	1.2	.3	**.4**	8.3
1983–84	Washington	62	5	20.9	.497	.167	.814	3.2	1.2	.2	.3	9.2
1984–85	Washington	69	21	22.4	.472	.000	.830	3.0	.8	.1	.2	8.9
1985–86	Washington	56	1	15.4	.460	.000	.810	2.0	.6	.2	.2	5.8
Career		729	76	20.3	.483	.120	.806	4.0	1.1	.3	.3	8.1

==== Playoffs ====
Year	Team	GP	GS	MPG	FG%	3P%	FT%	RPG	APG	SPG	BPG	PPG
1976	Buffalo	1		3.0	.500		–	1.0	.0	.0	.0	2.0
1978	Atlanta	2		**37.5**	.565		–	**11.0**	.5	.5	.0	**13.0**
1979	Atlanta	**9**		18.1	.435		.842	3.8	.8	.2	.1	6.2
1982	Atlanta	2		23.5	**.615**	–	.667	3.5	.5	**1.5**	.0	10.0
1983	Atlanta	3		13.0	.333	–	**1.000**	2.3	.7	.3	**.7**	3.3
1984	Washington	4		10.5	.250	–	.500	.5	.8	.0	.0	2.3
1985	Washington	1	0	7.0	.000	.000	–	5.0	1.0	.0	.0	.0
1986	Washington	4	0	13.5	.500	–	–	1.3	**1.8**	.8	.0	4.0
Career		26	0	16.5	.439	.000	.793	3.2	.8	.4	.1	5.3

== Electoral history ==
Year	Office	Subject	Party	Votes	Pct	Opponent	Party	Votes	Pct
1986	Congress, District 4	Tom McMillen	Democrat	65,071	50.16	Robert R. Neall	Republican	64,643	49.84
1988	Congress, District 4	Tom McMillen	Democrat	128,624	68.30	Bradlyn McClanahan	Republican	59,688	31.70
1990	Congress, District 4	Tom McMillen	Democrat	85,601	58.85	Robert P. Duckworth	Republican	59,846	41.15
1992	Congress, District 1	Tom McMillen	Democrat	112,771	48.43	Wayne Gilchrest	Republican	120,084	51.57

U.S. House of Representatives
Preceded by Marjorie Holt	Member of the U.S. House of Representatives from Maryland's 4th congressional district 1987–1993	Succeeded by Albert Wynn
U.S. order of precedence (ceremonial)
Preceded by James Shannon as Former U.S. Representative	Order of precedence of the United States as Former U.S. Representative	Succeeded by John Delaney as Former U.S. Representative
