= 1976 NBA draft =

Basketball player selection

General information
- Sport: Basketball
- Date: June 8, 1976
- Location: Madison Square Garden (New York City, New York)

Overview
- 173 total selections in 10 rounds
- League: NBA
- First selection: John Lucas, Houston Rockets
- Hall of Famers: 4: G Adrian Dantley; C Robert Parish; F Alex English; G Dennis Johnson

The 1976 NBA draft was the 30th annual draft of the National Basketball Association (NBA). The draft was held on June 8, 1976, before the 1976–77 season. In this draft, 18 NBA teams took turns selecting amateur U.S. college basketball players and other eligible players, including international players. The first two picks in the draft belonged to the teams that finished last in each conference, with the order determined by a coin flip. The Atlanta Hawks won the coin flip and were awarded the first overall pick, while the Chicago Bulls were awarded the second pick. The Hawks then traded the first pick to the Houston Rockets before the draft. The remaining first-round picks and the subsequent rounds were assigned to teams in reverse order of their win–loss record in the previous season. The New York Knicks forfeited their first-round draft pick due to their illegal signing of George McGinnis whose rights were held by the Philadelphia 76ers. The 76ers, the Golden State Warriors and the Buffalo Braves also forfeited their second, third and fourth-round picks respectively due to their participation in the 1975 supplementary draft of American Basketball Association (ABA) players who had never been drafted in the NBA. A player who had finished his four-year college eligibility was eligible for selection. If a player left college early, he would not be eligible for selection until his college class graduated. Before the draft, 26 college underclassmen were declared eligible for selection under the "hardship" rule. 13 of them withdrew before the draft, leaving only 13 early entry candidates eligible for selection. These players had applied and gave evidence of financial hardship to the league, which granted them the right to start earning their living by starting their professional careers earlier. The draft consisted of 10 rounds comprising the selection of 173 players. On August 8, 1976, the league also hosted a Dispersal draft for ABA players from the Kentucky Colonels and Spirits of St. Louis, who were not included in the ABA–NBA merger.

== Draft selections and draftee career notes ==
John Lucas from the University of Maryland was selected first overall by the Houston Rockets. Adrian Dantley from the University of Notre Dame, who went on to win the Rookie of the Year Award in his first season, was selected 6th by the Buffalo Braves. Four players from this draft, Dantley, 8th pick Robert Parish, 23rd pick Alex English and 29th pick Dennis Johnson, have been inducted to the Basketball Hall of Fame. Parish was also named to the list of the 50 Greatest Players in NBA History announced at the league's 50th anniversary in 1996. Dantley was selected to two All-NBA Teams and six All-Star Games. Parish won three NBA championships with the Boston Celtics in the 1980s. Later in his career, he added another championship in 1997 with the Chicago Bulls. His other achievements include two All-NBA Team selections and nine All-Star Game selections. English's achievements include three All-NBA Team selections and eight All-Star Game selections. Johnson won the NBA championships, along with the Finals Most Valuable Player Award, with the Seattle SuperSonics in 1979. He then won two other championships with the Celtics in the 1980s. He was selected to two All-NBA Teams, five All-Star Games and nine All-Defensive Teams.

Lonnie Shelton, the 25th pick, is the only other player from this draft who was selected to an All-Star Game. Lucas, 22nd pick Johnny Davis and 99th pick Mike Dunleavy all became head coaches after ending their playing career. Lucas has coached three teams in six seasons while Davis has coached three teams in four seasons. Dunleavy won the Coach of the Year Award in 1999 with the Portland Trail Blazers. He coached four teams in 17 seasons. Two other players drafted also went on to have coaching careers in the NBA: Dennis Johnson and seventh pick Quinn Buckner.

== Key ==
Pos.	G	F	C
Position	Guard	Forward	Center

^	Denotes player who has been inducted to the Naismith Memorial Basketball Hall of Fame
*	Denotes player who has been selected for at least one All-Star Game and All-NBA Team
^{+}	Denotes player who has been selected for at least one All-Star Game
^{#}	Denotes player who has never appeared in an NBA regular-season or playoff game
^{~}	Denotes player who has been selected as Rookie of the Year

== Draft ==
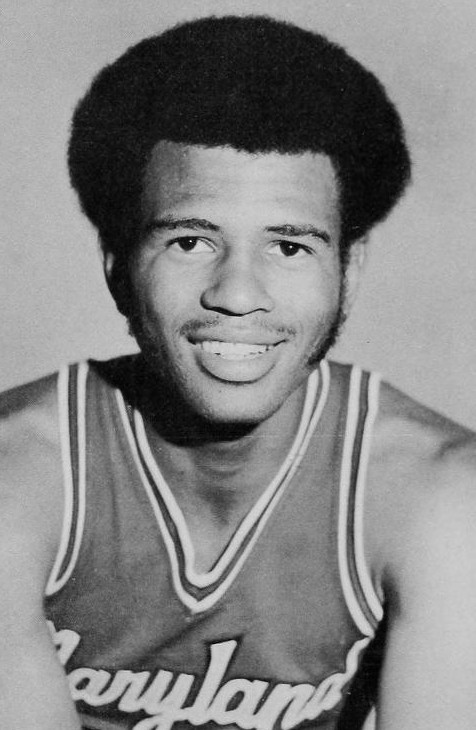
John Lucas of Maryland was the first overall pick by the Houston Rockets.

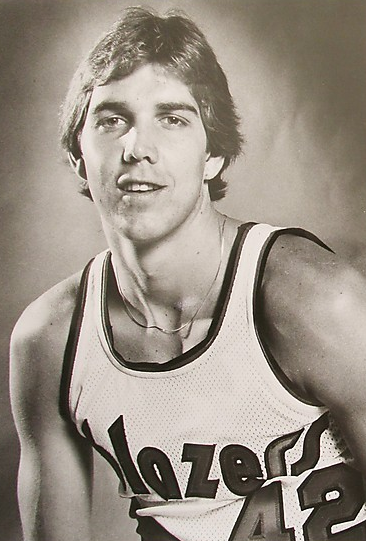
Wally Walker was selected fifth overall by the Portland Trail Blazers.

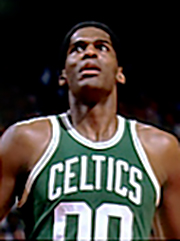
Robert Parish was selected eighth overall by the Golden State Warriors.

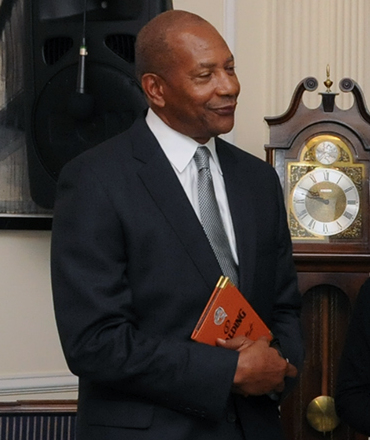
Alex English was selected 23rd overall by the Milwaukee Bucks.

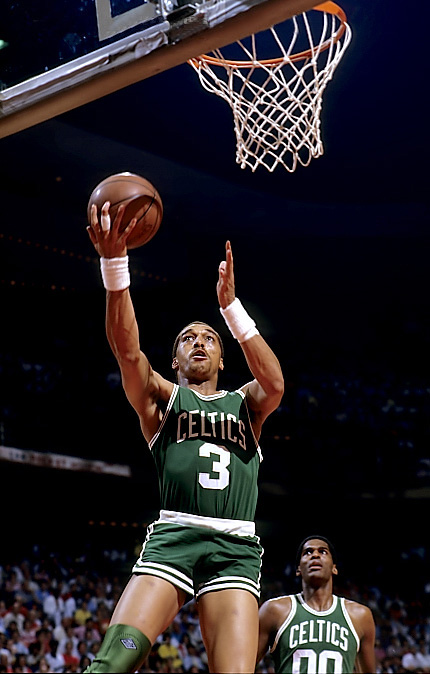
Dennis Johnson was selected 29th overall by the Seattle SuperSonics.

Rnd.	Pick	Player	Pos.	Nationality (Note: Nationality indicates the player's national team or representative nationality. If a player has not competed at the international level, then the nationality indicates the national team which the player is eligible to represent according to FIBA rules.)	Team	School / club team
1	1	John Lucas	G	United States	Houston Rockets (from Atlanta)^{[a]}	Maryland (Sr.)
1	2	Scott May	F	United States	Chicago Bulls	Indiana (Sr.)
1	3	Richard Washington	F/C	United States	Kansas City Kings	UCLA (Jr.)
1	4	Leon Douglas	F/C	United States	Detroit Pistons	Alabama (Sr.)
1	5	Wally Walker	F	United States	Portland Trail Blazers	Virginia (Sr.)
1	New York Knicks (forfeited due to player signing violation)					
1	6	Adrian Dantley^^{~}	G/F	United States	Buffalo Braves (from New Orleans via Phoenix)^{[b]}	Notre Dame (Jr.)
1	7	Quinn Buckner	G	United States	Milwaukee Bucks	Indiana (Sr.)
1	8	Robert Parish^	C	United States	Golden State Warriors (from Los Angeles)^{[c]}	Centenary (Sr.)
1	9	Armond Hill	G	United States	Atlanta Hawks (from Houston)^{[a]}	Princeton (Sr.)
1	10	Ron Lee	G	United States	Phoenix Suns	Oregon (Sr.)
1	11	Bob Wilkerson	G/F	United States	Seattle SuperSonics	Indiana (Sr.)
1	12	Terry Furlow	G/F	United States	Philadelphia 76ers	Michigan State (Sr.)
1	13	Mitch Kupchak	F/C	United States	Washington Bullets (from Buffalo)^{[d]}	North Carolina (Sr.)
1	14	Larry Wright	G	United States	Washington Bullets	Grambling State (Jr.)
1	15	Chuckie Williams	G	United States	Cleveland Cavaliers	Kansas State (Sr.)
1	16	Norm Cook	F	United States	Boston Celtics	Kansas (Jr.)
1	17	Sonny Parker	G/F	United States	Golden State Warriors	Texas A&M (Sr.)
2	18	Willie Smith	G	United States	Chicago Bulls	Missouri (Sr.)
2	19	Bayard Forrest	C	United States	Seattle SuperSonics (from Atlanta via Milwaukee)^{[e]}	Grand Canyon (Sr.)
2	20	Major Jones	F	United States	Portland Trail Blazers (from Kansas City via New Orleans)^{[f]}	Albany State (Sr.)
2	21	Earl Tatum	G/F	United States	Los Angeles Lakers (from Detroit via Phoenix)^{[g]}	Marquette (Sr.)
2	22	Johnny Davis	G	United States	Portland Trail Blazers	Dayton (Jr.)
2	23	Alex English^	F	United States	Milwaukee Bucks (from New Orleans via Atlanta)^{[e]}	South Carolina (Sr.)
2	24	Scott Lloyd	F/C	United States	Milwaukee Bucks	Arizona State (Sr.)
2	25	Lonnie Shelton^{+}	F/C	United States	New York Knicks	Oregon State (Jr.)
2	26	Jacky Dorsey	F	United States	New Orleans Jazz (from Los Angeles via Phoenix and Portland)^{[h]}	Georgia (So.)
2	27	Phil Hicks	F	United States	Houston Rockets	Tulane (Sr.)
2	28	Bob Carrington	G/F	United States	Atlanta Hawks (from Phoenix)^{[i]}	Boston College (Sr.)
2	29	Dennis Johnson^	G	United States	Seattle SuperSonics	Pepperdine (Sr.)
2	Philadelphia 76ers (forfeited due to participation in 1975 supplementary draft)					
2	30	Al Fleming	F	United States	Phoenix Suns (from Buffalo)^{[j]}	Arizona (Sr.)
2	31	Joe Pace	C	United States	Washington Bullets	Coppin State (Sr.)
2	32	Mo Howard	G	United States	Cleveland Cavaliers	Maryland (Sr.)
2	33	Butch Feher	G	United States	Phoenix Suns (from Boston)^{[k]}	Vanderbilt (Sr.)
2	34	Marshall Rogers	G	United States	Golden State Warriors	Pan American (Sr.)
3	35	Dallas Smith^{#}	C	United States	Chicago Bulls	West Texas A&M (Sr.)
3	36	Mike Dabney^{#}	G	United States	Los Angeles Lakers	Rutgers (Sr.)
3	37	Lars Hansen	C	Canada (Note: Lars Hansen was born in Denmark, but grew up in Canada and has represented the Canadian national team.)	Chicago Bulls (from Kansas City)^{[l]}	Washington (Sr.)
3	38	Phil Sellers	G/F	United States	Detroit Pistons	Rutgers (Sr.)
3	39	Jeff Tyson^{#}	G	United States	Portland Trail Blazers	Western Michigan (Sr.)
3	40	Lloyd Walton	G	United States	Milwaukee Bucks	Marquette (Sr.)
3	41	John McGill^{#}	F	United States	New York Knicks	Alcorn State (Sr.)
3	42	Steve Copp^{#}	F	United States	New Orleans Jazz	San Diego State (Sr.)
3	43	Tom Abernethy	F	United States	Los Angeles Lakers	Indiana (Sr.)
3	44	Barnes Hauptfuhrer^{#}	F	United States	Houston Rockets	Princeton (Sr.)
3	45	Ira Terrell	F/C	United States	Phoenix Suns	SMU (Sr.)
3	46	Larry Cooke^{#}	G	United States	Atlanta Hawks	Virginia Tech (Sr.)
3	47	Ron Norwood^{#}	G	United States	Philadelphia 76ers	DePaul (Jr.)
3	48	Gary Brewster^{#}	F	United States	Buffalo Braves	UTEP (Sr.)
3	49	Bill Cook^{#}	G	United States	Washington Bullets	Memphis (Sr.)
3	50	Gary Cole (Note: Gary Cole later changed his name into Abdul Jeelani. He used that name during his career in the NBA.)	F/C	United States	Cleveland Cavaliers	Wisconsin–Parkside (Sr.)
3	51	Jerry Fort^{#}	G	United States	Boston Celtics	Nebraska (Sr.)
3	Golden State Warriors (forfeited due to participation in 1975 supplementary draft)					
4	52	Keith Starr	G/F	United States	Chicago Bulls	Pittsburgh (Sr.)
4	53	Tom Barker	F/C	United States	Atlanta Hawks	Hawaii (Sr.)
4	54	Clarence Ramsey^{#}	G	United States	Kansas City Kings	Washington (Sr.)
4	55	Scott Thompson^{#}	G	United States	Detroit Pistons	Iowa (Sr.)
4	56	David Everett^{#}	G	United States	Portland Trail Blazers	Grand Canyon (Sr.)
4	57	Rick Bullock^{#}	F	United States	New York Knicks	Texas Tech (Sr.)
4	58	John Service^{#}	F	United States	New Orleans Jazz	UC Santa Barbara (Sr.)
4	59	Dan Frost^{#}	F	United States	Milwaukee Bucks	Iowa (Sr.)
4	60	Wayman Britt	G	United States	Los Angeles Lakers	Michigan (Sr.)
4	61	Hercle Ivy^{#}	G	United States	Houston Rockets	Iowa State (Sr.)
4	62	Paul Miller^{#}	F	United States	Phoenix Suns	Oregon State (Sr.)
4	63	Willie Parr^{#}	F	United States	Seattle SuperSonics	LeMoyne–Owen (Sr.)
4	64	Freeman Blade^{#}	G	United States	Philadelphia 76ers	Montana State Billings (Sr.)
4	Buffalo Braves (forfeited due to participation in 1975 supplementary draft)					
4	65	Marion Hillard^{#}	F	United States	Washington Bullets	Memphis (Sr.)
4	66	John Engles^{#}	F	United States	Cleveland Cavaliers	Penn (Sr.)
4	67	Lewis Linder^{#}	G	United States	Boston Celtics	Kentucky State (Sr.)
4	68	Jeff Fosnes^{#}	F	United States	Golden State Warriors	Vanderbilt (Sr.)
5	69	Nate Williams^{#}	G	United States	Chicago Bulls	Illinois (Sr.)
5	70	Ron Davis	G/F	United States	Atlanta Hawks	Washington State (Sr.)
5	71	Willie Hodge^{#}	F	United States	Kansas City Kings	Duke (Sr.)
5	72	Jim Hearns^{#}	G	United States	Detroit Pistons	Marymount (Sr.)
5	73	Gary Redding^{#}	F	United States	Portland Trail Blazers	Auburn (Sr.)
5	74	Paul Griffin	F/C	United States	New Orleans Jazz	Western Michigan (Sr.)
5	75	Tom Lockhart^{#}	F	United States	Milwaukee Bucks	Manhattan (Sr.)
5	76	Beaver Smith^{#}	G	United States	New York Knicks	St. John's (Sr.)
5	77	James Rappis^{#}	G	United States	Milwaukee Bucks	Arizona (Sr.)
5	78	Dave Marrs^{#}	F	United States	Houston Rockets	Houston (Sr.)
5	79	Ralph Walker^{#}	G	United States	Phoenix Suns	Saint Mary's (Sr.)
5	80	Robert Gray^{#}	F	United States	Seattle SuperSonics	Wichita State (Sr.)
5	81	Jeff Brown^{#}	F	United States	Philadelphia 76ers	Missouri Western (Sr.)
5	82	Connie White^{#}	G	United States	Atlanta Hawks	California (Sr.)
5	83	L. C. Mason^{#}	C	United States	Washington Bullets	Alabama State (Sr.)
5	84	Edmund Lawrence	C	United States	Cleveland Cavaliers	McNeese State (Sr.)
5	85	Lewis McKinney^{#}	G	United States	Boston Celtics	Saint Louis (Sr.)
5	86	Carl Bird^{#}	F	United States	Golden State Warriors	California (Sr.)
6	87	Tom Paulin^{#}	G	United States	Chicago Bulls	Winston-Salem State (Sr.)
6	88	Pete Padgett^{#}	F	United States	Atlanta Hawks	Nevada (Sr.)
6	89	Andre McCarter	G	United States	Kansas City Kings	UCLA (Sr.)
6	90	Russell Davis^{#}	F	United States	Detroit Pistons	Virginia Tech (Sr.)
6	91	Dwayne Barnett^{#}	F	United States	Golden State Warriors	Samford (Sr.)
6	92	Phil Spence^{#}	F	United States	Milwaukee Bucks	NC State (Sr.)
6	93	Joe Jones^{#}	G	United States	New York Knicks	Grambling State (Sr.)
6	94	Bernard Tomlin^{#}	G	United States	New Orleans Jazz	Hofstra (Sr.)
6	95	Ed Schweitzer^{#}	F	United States	Los Angeles Lakers	Stanford (Sr.)
6	96	Robert Paige^{#}	C	United States	Houston Rockets	Houston Baptist (Sr.)
6	97	Carl Brown^{#}	G	United States	Phoenix Suns	Eastern Kentucky (Sr.)
6	98	Daryl Peterson^{#}	F	United States	Seattle SuperSonics	Wake Forest (Sr.)
6	99	Mike Dunleavy	G	United States	Philadelphia 76ers	South Carolina (Sr.)
6	100	Danny Odums^{#}	G	United States	Buffalo Braves	Fairfield (Sr.)
6	101	Pat Tallent^{#}	G	United States	Washington Bullets	George Washington (Sr.)
6	102	Harry Davis^{#}	G	United States	Cleveland Cavaliers	Morris Brown (Sr.)
6	103	Art Collins	G	United States	Boston Celtics	Biscayne (Sr.)
6	104	Gene Cunningham^{#}	F	United States	Golden State Warriors	Norfolk State (Sr.)
7	105	Barry McLeod^{#}	G	United States	Chicago Bulls	Centenary (Sr.)
7	106	Carl Gerlach^{#}	F	United States	Atlanta Hawks	Kansas State (Sr.)
7	107	Craig Prosser^{#}	F	United States	Kansas City Kings	Canisius (Sr.)
7	108	Curt Peterson^{#}	C	United States	Detroit Pistons	Puget Sound (Sr.)
7	109	Al DeWitt^{#}	F	United States	Portland Trail Blazers	Weber State (Sr.)
7	110	Boyd Batts^{#}	F	United States	New York Knicks	UNLV (Sr.)
7	111	Andy Walker	G	United States	New Orleans Jazz	Niagara (Sr.)
7	112	Ron Barrow^{#}	G	United States	Milwaukee Bucks	Southern (Sr.)
7	113	Tommie Lipsey^{#}	F	United States	Los Angeles Lakers	Cal State Los Angeles (Sr.)
7	114	Barry Davis^{#}	F	United States	Houston Rockets	Texas A&M (Sr.)
7	115	Brad Warble^{#}	F	United States	Phoenix Suns	Eastern Illinois (Sr.)
7	116	Mark Klein^{#}	G	United States	Seattle SuperSonics	Malone (Sr.)
7	117	Phil Walker	G	United States	Philadelphia 76ers	Millersville (Jr.)
7	118	Frank Jones^{#}	G	United States	Buffalo Braves	Tennessee Tech (Sr.)
7	119	Ralph Vallot^{#}	G	United States	Washington Bullets	Loyola Chicago (Sr.)
7	120	Johnny Britt^{#}	G	United States	Cleveland Cavaliers	Western Kentucky (Sr.)
7	121	Ralph Drollinger	C	United States	Boston Celtics	UCLA (Sr.)
7	122	Jesse Campbell^{#}	F	United States	Golden State Warriors	Mercyhurst (Sr.)
8	123	Dale Koehler^{#}	F	United States	Cleveland Cavaliers	Wisconsin (Sr.)
8	124	Doug Terry^{#}	G	United States	Atlanta Hawks	Utah (Sr.)
8	125	Mike Davis^{#}	F	United States	Kansas City Kings	Bradley (Sr.)
8	126	Randy Henry^{#}	F	United States	Detroit Pistons	Illinois State (Sr.)
8	127	Brant Gibler^{#}	F	United States	Portland Trail Blazers	Puget Sound (Sr.)
8	128	Richard Bryant^{#}	F	United States	New Orleans Jazz	Texas State (Sr.)
8	129	Bob Warner^{#}	F	United States	Milwaukee Bucks	Maine (Sr.)
8	130	Rick McCutcheon^{#}	G	United States	New York Knicks	Arizona State (Sr.)
8	131	Ed Gregg^{#}	C	United States	Los Angeles Lakers	Utah State (Sr.)
8	132	Dan Krueger^{#}	G	United States	Houston Rockets	Texas (Sr.)
8	133	Tom DeBerry^{#}	F	United States	Phoenix Suns	Northern Arizona (Sr.)
8	134	Norton Barnhill	G	United States	Seattle SuperSonics	Washington State (Sr.)
8	135	Lee Dixon^{#}	F	United States	Philadelphia 76ers	Hardin–Simmons (Sr.)
8	136	Mark McAndrew^{#}	G	United States	Buffalo Braves	Providence (Sr.)
8	137	Merlin Wilson^{#}	C	United States	Washington Bullets	Georgetown (Sr.)
8	138	Tim Sisneros^{#}	C	United States	Cleveland Cavaliers	Middle Tennessee (Sr.)
8	139	John Clark^{#}	G	United States	Boston Celtics	Northeastern (Sr.)
8	140	Stan Boskovich^{#}	F	United States	Golden State Warriors	West Virginia (Sr.)
9	141	John Thomas^{#}	F	United States	Chicago Bulls	UConn (Sr.)
9	142	Bob Kovach^{#}	F	United States	Atlanta Hawks	San Diego State (Sr.)
9	143	Dave Logan^{#}	G	United States	Kansas City Kings	Colorado (Sr.)
9	144	Bill Martin^{#}	F	United States	Detroit Pistons	Hartwick (Sr.)
9	145	Rob Torresdal^{#}	F	United States	Portland Trail Blazers	Linfield (Sr.)
9	146	Bennie Shaw^{#}	G	United States	Milwaukee Bucks	UCF (Sr.)
9	147	Archie Talley^{#}	G	United States	New York Knicks	Salem (Sr.)
9	148	Calvin Robinson^{#}	F	United States	New Orleans Jazz	Mississippi Valley State (Sr.)
9	149	David Pickett^{#}	F	United States	Los Angeles Lakers	Louisiana–Monroe (Sr.)
9	150	John Irving^{#}	F	United States	Phoenix Suns	Hofstra (Jr.)
9	151	Ron Johnson^{#}	F	United States	Seattle SuperSonics	North Carolina A&T (Sr.)
9	152	Fly Williams^{#}	G	United States	Philadelphia 76ers	Allentown Jets (EBA)
9	153	Bob Rozyczko^{#}	F	United States	Buffalo Braves	St. Bonaventure (Sr.)
9	154	Clyde Agnew^{#}	F	United States	Washington Bullets	Newberry (Sr.)
9	155	Bruce Parkinson^{#}	G	United States	Cleveland Cavaliers	Purdue (Jr.)
9	156	Bill Collins^{#}	F	United States	Boston Celtics	Boston College (Sr.)
9	157	Howard Smith^{#}	F	United States	Golden State Warriors	San Francisco (Sr.)
10	158	John Hudson^{#}	F	United States	Chicago Bulls	Concord (Sr.)
10	159	Mike Dickerson^{#}	G	United States	Atlanta Hawks	South Florida (Sr.)
10	160	Terry Bailey^{#}	F	United States	Kansas City Kings	North Texas (Sr.)
10	161	Bob Johnson^{#}	F	United States	Detroit Pistons	Wisconsin (Sr.)
10	162	Marcos Leite^{#}	C	Brazil	Portland Trail Blazers	Pepperdine (Jr.)
10	163	Gene Shy^{#}	F	United States	New York Knicks	Florida (Sr.)
10	164	Art Johnson^{#}	F	United States	New Orleans Jazz	Iowa State (Sr.)
10	165	Hugo Cabrera^{#}	F	Dominican Republic	Milwaukee Bucks	East Texas State (Sr.)
10	166	Gary Jackson^{#}	F	United States	Phoenix Suns	Arizona State (Sr.)
10	167	Ricky Lewis^{#}	F	United States	Seattle SuperSonics	Alcorn State (Sr.)
10	168	Ed Stefanski^{#}	G	United States	Philadelphia 76ers	Penn (Sr.)
10	169	Tim Stokes^{#}	G	United States	Buffalo Braves	Canisius (Sr.)
10	170	Mike Buescher^{#}	F	United States	Washington Bullets	Seton Hall (Sr.)
10	171	Elisha McSweeney^{#}	F	Bahamas	Philadelphia 76ers	Minnesota State (Sr.)
10	172	Otho Tucker^{#}	F	United States	Boston Celtics	Illinois (Sr.)
10	173	Ken Smith^{#}	G	United States	Golden State Warriors	San Diego (Sr.)

== Trades ==
- ^{a 1} ^{2} On June 7, 1976, the Houston Rockets acquired Dwight Jones and the first pick from the Atlanta Hawks in exchange for Gus Bailey, Joe Meriweather and the ninth pick. The Rockets used the pick to draft John Lucas. The Hawks used the pick to draft Armond Hill.
- ^{b} On May 29, 1975, the Buffalo Braves acquired a first-round pick from the Phoenix Suns in exchange for a 1975 first-round pick. Previously, the Suns acquired Dennis Awtrey, Nate Hawthorne, Curtis Perry and the pick on September 16, 1974, from the New Orleans Jazz in exchange for Neal Walk and a 1975 second-round pick. The Braves used the pick to draft Adrian Dantley.
- ^{c} On September 6, 1974, the Golden State Warriors acquired a first-round pick from the Los Angeles Lakers as compensation for the signing of Cazzie Russell as a free agent. The Warriors used the pick to draft Robert Parish.
- ^{d} On July 30, 1975, the Washington Bullets acquired a first-round pick from the Buffalo Braves in exchange for Dick Gibbs. The Bullets used the pick to draft Mitch Kupchak.
- ^{e 1} ^{2} On October 22, 1975, the Seattle SuperSonics acquired a second-round pick from the Milwaukee Bucks in exchange for Jim Fox. Previously, the Bucks acquired two 1976 second-round picks on June 5, 1975, from the Atlanta Hawks as a compensation when the Hawks illegally signed Julius Erving. Previously the Hawks acquired Bob Kauffman, Dean Meminger, 1974 and 1975 first-round picks, 1975 and 1976 second-round picks, and a 1980 third-round pick on May 20, 1974, from the New Orleans Jazz in exchange for Pete Maravich. The Sonics used the pick to draft Bayard Forrest. The Bucks used the pick to draft Alex English.
- ^{f} On September 16, 1974, the Portland Trail Blazers acquired Barry Clemens and future consideration (the Blazers acquired a second-round pick on May 25, 1976) from the New Orleans Jazz in exchange for Rick Roberson. Previously, the Jazz acquired Ron Behagen and the pick on May 28, 1975, from the Kansas City Kings in exchange for a 1975 first-round pick. The Blazers used the pick to draft Major Jones.
- ^{g} On November 3, 1975, the Los Angeles Lakers acquired John Roche and a second-round pick from the Phoenix Suns in exchange for Pat Riley. Previously, the Suns acquired the pick on September 30, 1975, from the Detroit Pistons in exchange for Earl Williams. The Lakers used the pick to draft Earl Tatum.
- ^{h} On June 3, 1976, the New Orleans Jazz acquired a 1976 second-round pick from the Portland Trail Blazers in exchange for a 1977 second-round pick. Previously, the Blazers acquired the pick on June 9, 1975, from the Phoenix Suns in exchange for Phil Lumpkin. Previously, the Suns acquired the pick and a 1977 third-round pick on November 27, 1974, from the Los Angeles Lakers in exchange for Corky Calhoun. The Jazz used the pick to draft Jacky Dorsey.
- ^{i} On October 8, 1973, the Atlanta Hawks acquired a 1976 second-round pick and a 1977 third-round pick from the Phoenix Suns in exchange for Bob Christian. The Hawks used the pick to draft Bob Carrington.
- ^{j} On February 1, 1976, the Phoenix Suns acquired Gar Heard and a second-round pick from the Buffalo Braves in exchange for John Shumate. The Suns used the pick to draft Al Fleming.
- ^{k} On May 23, 1975, the Phoenix Suns acquired Paul Westphal, 1975 and 1976 second-round picks from the Boston Celtics in exchange for Charlie Scott. The Suns used the pick to draft Butch Feher.
- ^{l} On December 8, 1975, the Chicago Bulls acquired a 1977 second-round pick and a 1976 third-round pick from the Kansas City Kings in exchange for Matt Guokas. The Bulls used the pick to draft Lars Hansen.

== Early entrants ==
=== College underclassmen ===
After five years of allowing players into the NBA draft by what was considered to be a "Hardship Draft" at the time, the NBA decided to remove the hardship factor starting with this year's draft and allow for a greater influx of younger talents to enter the draft naturally. This year saw ten college underclassmen that previously entered the 1976 NBA draft in Texas Southern's Alonzo Bradley, Oral Roberts' Arnold Dugger, Marquette's Bo Ellis, UCLA's Marques Johnson, Tennessee's Bernard King, Oral Roberts' Anthony Roberts, Clemson's Wayne Rollins, Illinois Valley Community College's Hollis Vickery, Old Dominion's Wilson Washington, and Minnesota's Ray Williams all later decline their official entry into this year's draft, with fifteen players officially entering this year's draft. The following college basketball players successfully applied for early draft entrance.

- (United States) Norm Cook – F, Kansas (junior)
- (United States) Charles Daniels – G, Rice (junior)
- (United States) Adrian Dantley – F, Notre Dame (junior)
- (United States) Johnny Davis – G, Dayton (junior)
- (United States) Jacky Dorsey – F, Georgia (sophomore)
- (United States) Edward Douglas – F, Rutgers–Newark (sophomore)
- (United States) Daryl Gainey – F, Fairmont State (junior)
- (United States) Reggie Glasgow – G, UC Irvine (junior)
- (United States) Loy Hudson – F, Albany State (junior)
- (United States) Robert Kelley – G, Guilford (junior)
- (United States) Warnel Lamb – F, Lehigh County CC (sophomore)
- (Brazil) Marcos Leite - C, Pepperdine (junior)
- (United States) Lonnie Shelton – F, Oregon State (junior)
- (United States) Richard Washington – F, UCLA (junior)
- (United States) Larry Wright – G, Grambling State (junior)

== ABA dispersal draft ==
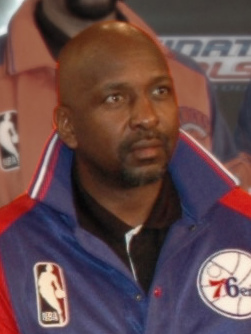
Moses Malone was selected by the Portland Trail Blazers from the Spirits of St. Louis.

On August 5, 1976, the NBA hosted a dispersal draft to select players from the Kentucky Colonels and Spirits of St. Louis, the American Basketball Association (ABA) franchises that were not included in the ABA–NBA merger. (A third ABA team that had survived that league's final season, the Virginia Squires, folded operations a month before those merger talks officially began due to a failed payment to the ABA, meaning their players weren't considered eligible to be included in the dispersal draft.) The eighteen NBA teams and the four ABA teams that joined the NBA, the Denver Nuggets, Indiana Pacers, New York Nets and San Antonio Spurs, were allowed to participate in the draft. The teams selected in reverse order of their win–loss percentage in the previous NBA and ABA seasons. The team that made a selection must pay a certain price for the signing rights to the player, which are set by the league's committee. The money from the draft was used to help the four ABA teams that merged with the NBA to pay off some of their obligations to the two folded ABA franchises, the Colonels and the Spirits. The team that made a selection must assume the player's ABA contract. Players who were not selected would become free agents.

Twenty players from the Colonels and the Spirits were available for the 1976 ABA dispersal draft. Eleven were selected in the first round and the twelfth player was selected in the second round. Eight players were not selected and thus became a free agent. The Chicago Bulls used the first pick to select five-time ABA All-Star Artis Gilmore with a signing price of $1,100,000. The Portland Trail Blazers, who acquired the Atlanta Hawks' second pick, selected Maurice Lucas and Moses Malone with signing price of $300,000 and $350,000 respectively. Marvin Barnes, who was selected fourth by the Detroit Pistons was the second most expensive player in the draft with a signing price of $500,000. Several teams elected to pass their first-round picks and only the Kansas City Kings used the second-round pick. The draft continued until the third round, but no other players were selected.

Round	Pick	Player	Pos.	Nationality	Team	ABA team	Signing price	Ref.
1	1	Artis Gilmore^	C	United States	Chicago Bulls	Kentucky Colonels	$1,100,000	
1	2	Maurice Lucas*	F/C	United States	Portland Trail Blazers (from Atlanta)^{[m]}	Kentucky Colonels	$300,000	
1	3	Ron Boone	G/F	United States	Kansas City Kings	Spirits of St. Louis	$250,000	
1	4	Marvin Barnes	F/C	United States	Detroit Pistons	Spirits of St. Louis	$500,000	
1	5	Moses Malone^	F/C	United States	Portland Trail Blazers	Spirits of St. Louis	$350,000	
1	6	Randy Denton	C	United States	New York Knicks	Spirits of St. Louis	$50,000	
1	7	Bird Averitt	G	United States	Buffalo Braves (from Milwaukee)^{[n]}	Kentucky Colonels	$125,000	
1	8	Wil Jones	F	United States	Indiana Pacers	Kentucky Colonels	$50,000	
1	9	Ron Thomas^{#}	G/F	United States	Houston Rockets	Kentucky Colonels	$15,000	
1	10	Louie Dampier^	G	United States	San Antonio Spurs	Kentucky Colonels	$20,000	
1	11	Jan van Breda Kolff	G/F	United States	New York Nets	Kentucky Colonels	$60,000	
2	12	Mike Barr	G	United States	Kansas City Kings	Spirits of St. Louis	$15,000	

=== Trades ===
- ^{m} On the draft-day, the Portland Trail Blazers acquired the second pick from the Atlanta Hawks in exchange for Geoff Petrie and Steve Hawes. The Blazers used the pick to draft Maurice Lucas.
- ^{n} On the draft-day, the Buffalo Braves acquired the seventh pick from the Milwaukee Bucks in exchange for a 1977 second-round pick. The Braves used the pick to draft Bird Averitt.

== See also ==
- List of first overall NBA draft picks
