= Cleveland Cavaliers draft history =

List of selected Cleveland Cavaliers players from the NBA draft

In their 56-year history, the Cleveland Cavaliers have selected the following players in the National Basketball Association draft.

== Key ==
Naismith Basketball Hall of Famer	First overall NBA draft pick	Selected for an NBA All-Star Game

Year	Round	Pick	Player	College/high school/club
2026	1	29	Alex Karaban	University of Connecticut
2025	2	49	Tyrese Proctor	Duke University
2025	2	58	Saliou Niang	Italy
2024	1	20	Jaylon Tyson	University of California, Berkeley
2023	2	49	Emoni Bates	Eastern Michigan University
2022	1	14	Ochai Agbaji	University of Kansas
2022	2	39	Khalifa Diop	Senegal
2022	2	49	Isaiah Mobley	USC
2022	2	56	Luke Travers	Australia
2021	1	3	Evan Mobley	USC
2020	1	5	Isaac Okoro	Auburn University
2019	1	5	Darius Garland	Vanderbilt University
2019	1	26	Dylan Windler	Belmont University
2018	1	8	Collin Sexton	University of Alabama
2015	1	24	Tyus Jones	Duke University
2015	2	53	Sir'Dominic Pointer	St. John's University
2014	1	1	Andrew Wiggins	University of Kansas
2014	2	33	Joe Harris	University of Virginia
2013	1	1	Anthony Bennett	University of Nevada, Las Vegas
2013	1	19	Sergey Karasev	Russia
2013	2	31	Allen Crabbe	University of California, Berkeley
2013	2	34	Carrick Felix	Arizona State University
2012	1	4	Dion Waiters	Syracuse University
2012	1	24	Jared Cunningham	Oregon State University
2012	2	33	Bernard James	Florida State University
2012	2	34	Jae Crowder	Marquette University
2011	1	1	Kyrie Irving	Duke University
2011	1	4	Tristan Thompson	University of Texas at Austin
2011	2	32	Justin Harper	University of Richmond
2011	2	54	Milan Mačvan	Serbia
2009	1	30	Christian Eyenga	DR Congo
2009	2	46	Danny Green	University of North Carolina
2008	1	19	JJ Hickson	North Carolina State University
2006	1	25	Shannon Brown	Michigan State University
2006	2	42	Daniel Gibson	University of Texas at Austin
2006	2	55	Ejike Ugboaja	Nigeria
2004	1	10	Luke Jackson	University of Oregon
2003	1	1	LeBron James	St. Vincent–St. Mary High School
2003	2	31	Jason Kapono	University of California, Los Angeles
2002	1	6	Dajuan Wagner	University of Memphis
2002	2	34	Carlos Boozer	Duke University
2001	1	8	DeSagana Diop	Oak Hill Academy
2001	1	20	Brendan Haywood	University of North Carolina
2001	2	35	Jeff Trepagnier	University of Southern California
2000	1	7	Jamal Crawford	University of Michigan
1999	1	8	Andre Miller	University of Utah
1999	1	11	Trajan Langdon	Duke University
1999	2	39	A. J. Bramlett	University of Arizona
1998	2	48	Ryan Stack	University of South Carolina
1997	1	13	Derek Anderson	University of Kentucky
1997	1	16	Brevin Knight	Stanford University
1997	2	44	Cedric Henderson	University of Memphis
1996	1	12	Vitaly Potapenko	Wright State University
1996	1	20	Zydrunas Ilgauskas	Lithuania
1996	2	56	Reggie Geary	University of Arizona
1995	1	17	Bob Sura	Florida State University
1995	2	39	Donny Marshall	University of Connecticut
1994	2	42	Gary Collier	University of Tulsa
1993	1	22	Chris Mills	University of Arizona
1991	1	11	Terrell Brandon	University of Oregon
1991	2	39	Jimmy Oliver	Purdue University
1990	2	52	Stefano Rusconi	Italy
1989	1	25	John Morton	Seton Hall University
1989	2	43	Chucky Brown	North Carolina State University
1988	1	22	Randolph Keys	University of Southern Mississippi
1988	3	64	Winston Bennett	University of Kentucky
1987	1	7	Kevin Johnson	University of California
1987	2	41	Kannard Johnson	Western Kentucky University
1987	3	52	Donald Royal	University of Notre Dame
1987	4	75	Chris Dudley	Yale University
1987	4	80	Carven Holcombe	Texas Christian University
1987	5	98	Carl Lott	Texas Christian University
1987	6	121	Harold Jensen	Villanova University
1987	7	144	Mike Foster	University of South Carolina
1986	1	1	Brad Daugherty	University of North Carolina
1986	1	8	Ron Harper	Miami University
1986	2	29	Johnny Newman	University of Richmond
1986	3	50	Kevin Henderson	California State University, Fullerton
1986	4	73	Warren Martin	University of North Carolina
1986	5	96	Ben Davis	Gardner–Webb University
1986	6	119	Gilbert Wilburn	New Mexico State University
1986	7	142	Ralph Dalton	Georgetown University
1985	1	9	Charles Oakley	Virginia Union University
1985	2	30	Calvin Duncan	Virginia Commonwealth University
1985	2	45	John Williams	Tulane University
1985	3	55	Herb Johnson	University of Tulsa
1985	4	79	Mark Davis	Old Dominion University
1985	5	101	Gunther Behnke	Germany
1985	6	125	Ricky Johnson	Illinois State University
1985	7	147	Buzz Peterson	University of North Carolina
1984	1	12	Tim McCormick	University of Michigan
1984	2	27	Ron Anderson	California State University, Fresno
1984	3	50	Ben McDonald	University of California, Irvine
1984	3	60	Leonard Mitchell	Louisiana State University
1984	4	73	Art Aaron	Northwestern University
1984	5	96	Vince Hinchen	Boise State University
1984	6	119	Matt Doherty	University of North Carolina
1984	7	142	Joe Jakubick	University of Akron
1984	8	165	Elliot Beard	Oberlin College
1984	9	187	John Shimko	Xavier University
1984	10	209	Darrell Space	Northeastern Illinois University
1983	1	20	Roy Hinson	Rutgers University
1983	1	24	Stewart Granger	Villanova University
1983	2	27	John Garris	Boston College
1983	3	50	Paul Thompson	Tulane University
1983	3	56	Larry Anderson	University of Nevada, Las Vegas
1983	3	66	Les Craft	Kansas State University
1983	3	67	Derrick Hord	University of Kentucky
1983	4	73	Dwight Jones	University of Cincinnati
1983	5	96	Chris Logan	College of the Holy Cross
1983	6	119	Mel McLaughlin	Central Michigan University
1983	7	142	John Columbo	John Carroll University
1983	8	165	Larry Tucker	Lewis University
1983	9	187	Joe Brown	Georgia State University
1983	10	208	Jon Hanley	Xavier University
1982	1	12	John Bagley	Boston College
1982	2	28	Dave Magley	University of Kansas
1982	3	47	Michael Wilson	Marquette University
1982	4	70	Reggie Hannah	University of South Alabama
1982	5	93	Terry White	University of Texas at El Paso
1982	6	116	Vince Reynolds	University of South Florida
1982	7	139	Randy Reed	Kansas State University
1982	8	162	Monty Knight	Virginia Commonwealth University
1982	9	185	Tony Hafley	University of South Alabama
1982	10	206	Durand Walker	Marion College
1981	3	55	Mickey Dillard	Florida State University
1981	3	59	Russell Bowers	American University
1981	4	74	Ethan Martin	Louisiana State University
1981	5	96	Ken Page	University of New Mexico
1981	6	120	Aaron Strayhorn	University of Hawaii
1981	7	142	Andre Smith	University of Nebraska–Lincoln
1981	8	166	Glen Marcus	University of Alabama at Birmingham
1981	9	187	Paul Roba	Cleveland State University
1981	10	208	Greg Boone	Augsburg College
1980	1	22	Chad Kinch	University of North Carolina at Charlotte
1980	3	53	Stuart House	Washington State University
1980	3	55	Wayne Abrams	Southern Illinois University
1980	3	68	Ron Jones	Illinois State University
1980	4	77	Murray Brown	Florida State University
1980	5	101	LaVon Williams	University of Kentucky
1980	6	123	Antonio Martin	Oral Roberts University
1980	7	147	Leroy Berry	Wilmington College
1980	8	166	Jim Ellinghausen	Ohio State University
1980	9	187	Melvin Crafter	Central State University
1979	2	26	Bruce Flowers	University of Notre Dame
1979	3	65	Bill Laimbeer	University of Notre Dame
1979	4	70	Rick Swing	The Citadel
1979	5	91	Matt Simpkins	Georgia Southern University
1979	6	112	Joe Manning	North Texas State University
1979	7	131	Steve Skaggs	Ohio University
1979	8	151	Mark Haymore	University of Massachusetts Amherst
1979	9	169	Tim Joyce	Ohio University
1979	10	188	Terry Peavy	Point Park University
1978	1	15	Mike Mitchell	Auburn University
1978	2	33	Harry Davis	Florida State University
1978	3	57	Ken Higgs	Louisiana State University
1978	4	78	Stan Rome	Clemson University
1978	5	99	Ken Koenigs	University of Kansas
1978	6	123	Ron Bell	Virginia Tech
1978	7	143	Tony Smith	University of Nevada, Las Vegas
1978	8	161	Roland Martin	Missouri Southern State University
1978	9	180	Steve Bayless	Central State University
1978	10	194	Gary Winton	United States Military Academy
1977	2	33	Eddie Jordan	Rutgers University
1977	3	55	Steve Grote	University of Michigan
1977	4	77	Melvin Jones	West Texas A&M University
1977	5	99	Al Smith	Jackson State University
1977	6	121	Ron Cox	Eastern Washington University
1977	7	141	Bob Riddle	Eastern Michigan University
1977	8	160	Tom Cutter	Western Michigan University
1976	1	15	Chuckie Williams	Kansas State University
1976	2	32	Mo Howard	University of Maryland
1976	3	50	Gary Cole (Note: Now known as Abdul Qadir Jeelani.)	University of Wisconsin–Parkside
1976	4	66	John Engles	University of Pennsylvania
1976	5	84	Edmund Lawrence	McNeese State University
1976	6	102	Harry Davis	Morris Brown College
1976	7	120	Johnny Britt	Western Kentucky University
1976	8	123	Dale Koehler	University of Wisconsin–Madison
1976	8	138	Tim Sisneros	Middle Tennessee State University
1976	9	155	Bruce Parkinson	Purdue University
1976	10	171	Elisha McSweeney	Minnesota State University, Mankato
1975	1	15	John Lambert	University of Southern California
1975	2	28	Dan Roundfield	Central Michigan University
1975	2	33	Mel Utley	St. John's University
1975	3	45	Ted Hathaway	Cleveland State University
1975	4	62	Eric Fernsten	University of San Francisco
1975	5	79	Jim Lee	Syracuse University
1975	5	82	Mike Odems	Western Kentucky University
1975	6	99	Henry Ward	Jackson State University
1975	7	116	Shawn Leftwich	Jacksonville University
1975	8	136	Andre McCarter	University of California, Los Angeles
1975	9	152	Skip Howard	Bowling Green State University
1975	10	167	Eric Anderson	Macalester College
1974	1	8	Campy Russell	University of Michigan
1974	3	38	Clarence Walker	State University of West Georgia
1974	3	39	Kevin Restani	University of San Francisco
1974	4	57	James Foster	University of Connecticut
1974	5	75	Gary Novak	University of Notre Dame
1974	6	93	Aron Stewart	University of Richmond
1974	7	111	Mike Robinson	Michigan State University
1974	8	129	Kerry Hughes	University of Wisconsin–Madison
1974	9	147	Jim Buskofsky	Upper Iowa University
1974	10	164	Jim Kelly	Loras College
1973	1	2	Jim Brewer	University of Minnesota
1973	2	26	Allan Hornyak	Ohio State University
1973	3	37	Jim O'Brien	University of Maryland
1973	3	40	Ozzie Edwards	Oklahoma City University
1973	3	41	James Lister	Sam Houston State University
1973	4	57	Luke Witte	Ohio State University
1973	5	74	John Coughran	University of California
1973	6	91	Willie Calvert	Abilene Christian University
1973	7	108	Larry Farmer	University of California, Los Angeles
1973	8	125	John Ritter	Indiana University
1973	9	142	Les Taylor	Murray State University
1973	10	156	Dean Martin	Baldwin-Wallace College
1973	11	169	Floyd Lewis	Harvard University
1973	12	178	Chris McMurray	San Diego State University
1973	13	185	John Pennebacker	University of Hawaii
1973	14	191	Charles Mitchell	Eastern Kentucky University
1973	15	196	Reese Stovall	University of Texas–Pan American
1973	16	201	Tom O'Connor	University of Iowa
1973	17	205	Phil Elderkin	Boston University
1972	1	3	Dwight Davis	University of Houston
1972	2	24	Steve Hawes	University of Washington
1972	4	50	Hank Siemiontkowski	Villanova University
1972	5	66	Sam Cash	University of California, Riverside
1972	6	83	Tom Parker	University of Kentucky
1972	7	100	Steve Davidson	West Texas A&M University
1972	8	116	Roger Evans	Kent State University
1972	9	132	Greg Starrick	Southern Illinois University
1972	10	145	Kent Martens	Abilene Christian University
1971	1	1	Austin Carr	University of Notre Dame
1971	2	18	Steve Patterson	University of California, Los Angeles
1971	2	35	Willie Long	University of New Mexico
1971	3	36	Gerald Lockett	University of Arkansas at Pine Bluff
1971	3	41	Jackie Ridgle	University of California
1971	4	52	Cliff Harris	Hardin–Simmons University
1971	5	69	Brian Mahoney	Manhattan College
1971	6	86	Mike Childress	Colorado State University
1971	7	103	Tom Bush	Drake University
1971	8	120	Charlie Davis	Wake Forest University
1971	9	137	Rich Walker	Bowling Green State University
1971	10	153	Jim Meredith	Washington State University
1971	11	169	Mike Casey	University of Kentucky
1971	12	183	Doug Hess	University of Toledo
1971	13	196	Bobby Jones	Drake University
1971	14	208	Bubbles Harris	Indiana University
1971	15	217	Larry Baker	Wittenberg University
1971	16	225	Vance Tyree	University of Wisconsin–La Crosse
1970	1	7	John Johnson	University of Iowa
1970	2	26	Dave Sorenson	Ohio State University
1970	3	41	Surry Oliver	Stephen F. Austin State University
1970	4	60	Glen Vidnovic	University of Iowa
1970	5	75	Wayne Sokolowski	Ashland University
1970	6	94	Joe Cooke	Indiana University
1970	7	109	Narvis Anderson	Stephen F. Austin State University
1970	8	128	Walter Robertson	Loyola University Chicago
1970	9	143	Tom Lagodich	Kent State University
1970	10	162	Ken Johnson	Indiana University
1970	11	175	Dave Schneider	Wayne State University
1970	12	189	Oliver Taylor	University of Houston
1970	13	198	Kevin Wilson	Ashland University
1970	14	209	Don Tomilson	University of Missouri
1970	15	217	Steve Wannamaker	Drake University
1970	16	227	Steve Wilson	Hanover College
1970	17	231	Bob Peterson	Concordia College (Minnesota)
1970	18	236	John Cannon	Grambling State University
1970	19	238	Allen Waller	St. Mary of the Plains College
