= Dwight Davis (basketball) =

American basketball player

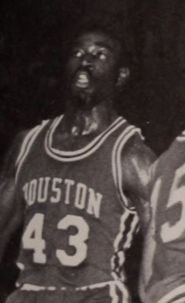
- Davis with the Houston Cougars in the 1971–72 season

Personal information
- Born: October 11, 1949 (age 77) Houston, Texas, U.S.
- Listed height: 6 ft 8 in (2.03 m)
- Listed weight: 220 lb (100 kg)

Career information
- High school: Worthing (Houston, Texas)
- College: Houston (1969–1972)
- NBA draft: 1972: 1st round, 3rd overall pick
- Drafted by: Cleveland Cavaliers
- Playing career: 1972–1977
- Position: Power forward
- Number: 42

Career history
- 1972–1975: Cleveland Cavaliers
- 1975–1977: Golden State Warriors

Career highlights
- NBA All-Rookie First Team (1973); Second-team All-American – AP (1972); No. 42 retired by Houston Cougars

Career NBA statistics
- Points: 2,936 (8.6 ppg)
- Rebounds: 1,991 (5.9 rpg)
- Assists: 529 (1.6 apg)
- Stats at NBA.com
- Stats at Basketball Reference

Dwight E. Davis (born October 11, 1949) is a retired American professional basketball player. After playing college basketball at the University of Houston from 1969 to 1972, Davis was selected as the 3rd overall pick of 1972 NBA draft by the Cleveland Cavaliers. Nicknamed "Double D", Davis played for five seasons in the NBA.

== College career ==
Graduating from Worthing High School in Houston, Texas, Davis enrolled at Houston, recruited by Hall of Fame Coach Guy Lewis.

As a sophomore in 1969–1970, Davis averaged 19.9 points and 10.3 rebounds as Houston finished 25–5 and advanced to the 1970 NCAA University Division basketball tournament.

Davis averaged 20.1 points, 12.3 rebounds and 2.9 assists as the 1970–1971 Cougars were 22–7. In the 1971 NCAA University Division basketball tournament, Davis had 30 points and 8 rebounds in Houston's opening round win over New Mexico State and averaged 22 points and 10 rebounds in the Cougars' three games.

As a senior in 1971–1972, Davis averaged 24.4 points, 11.7 rebounds and 3.9 assists. Houston finished 20–7 and again appeared in the NCAA Tournament.

Davis earned a BS degree from Houston and is a member of the Bauer Business School Circle of Honor.

== NBA career ==
Davis was the No. 3 overall pick of the 1972 NBA draft by the Cleveland Cavaliers. He averaged 9.4 points and 7.0 rebounds as a rookie for the Cavaliers and Coach Bill Fitch. Davis was named to the First Team All-Rookie Team along with Freddie Boyd, Bob McAdoo, Lloyd Neal and Jim Price.

Davis had the best year of his NBA career in 1973–1974, averaging 12.5 points, 8.5 rebounds and 2.4 assists. He followed that season with a 9.8 point and 5.9 rebound season for the Cavaliers in 1974–1975.

On May 29, 1975, Davis was traded by the Cavaliers to the Golden State Warriors for Butch Beard, a 1975 1st round draft pick (John Lambert was later selected) and a 1975 2nd round draft pick (Mel Utley was later selected).

In 72 games with the Warriors in 1975–1976, Davis averaged 4.2 points and 3.1 rebounds, in 12 minutes per game, as the Warriors advanced to the Western Division Finals. The next season he played in just 33 games with 4.8 point and 2.9 rebound averages, as he suffered a career ending injury. He tore his quadriceps on a play against the Boston Celtics on February 20, 1977.

Overall in his NBA career with the Cleveland Cavaliers (1972–75) and Golden State Warriors (1975–77), The 6 ft 8 in forward averaged 8.6 points and 5.9 rebounds in 340 career regular season games.

== Personal ==
Davis currently lives in New Hampshire, with his wife Gayle. He is the father of four children.

Davis is the past chair, vice-chair and served on the board of directors for the National Basketball Retired Players Association (NBRPA) from 2014 – 2018.

In 2007, Davis was appointed by New Hampshire Governor John Lynch to the N.H. Workforce Youth Council, and in 2008 he became the chair. Davis has been reappointed to the WOIA board by Governors Hassan and Sununu. He served as a board member of the Greater Seacoast United Way, and is a current board member of Prospero Health and Cambridge Trust, and President of the Black Heritage Trail of New Hampshire.

== Career statistics ==
Legend
GP	Games played	GS	Games started	MPG	Minutes per game
FG%	Field goal percentage	3P%	3-point field goal percentage	FT%	Free throw percentage
RPG	Rebounds per game	APG	Assists per game	SPG	Steals per game
BPG	Blocks per game	PPG	Points per game	**Bold**	Career high

=== NBA ===
==== Regular season ====
Year	Team	GP	MPG	FG%	FT%	RPG	APG	SPG	BPG	PPG
1972–73	Cleveland	**81**	26.6	.392	**.793**	7.0	1.5			9.4
1973–74	Cleveland	76	**32.6**	.436	.719	**8.5**	**2.4**	**.8**	**1.0**	**12.5**
1974–75	Cleveland	78	25.2	.443	.718	5.9	1.9	.6	.5	9.8
1975–76	Golden State	72	12.0	.413	.690	3.1	.6	.3	.4	4.2
1976–77	Golden State	33	16.7	**.444**	.681	2.9	.9	.3	.2	4.8
Career		340	23.6	.423	.730	5.9	1.6	.5	.6	8.6

==== Playoffs ====
Year	Team	GP	MPG	FG%	FT%	RPG	APG	SPG	BPG	PPG
1976	Golden State	11	12.9	.432	.818	2.5	.9	.3	.4	4.5

== Honors ==
- Davis was inducted into the "Hall of Honor" at the University of Houston in 2006, and the school retired his jersey number, 42, in 2026.
