= Jim Cleamons =

American basketball player and coach

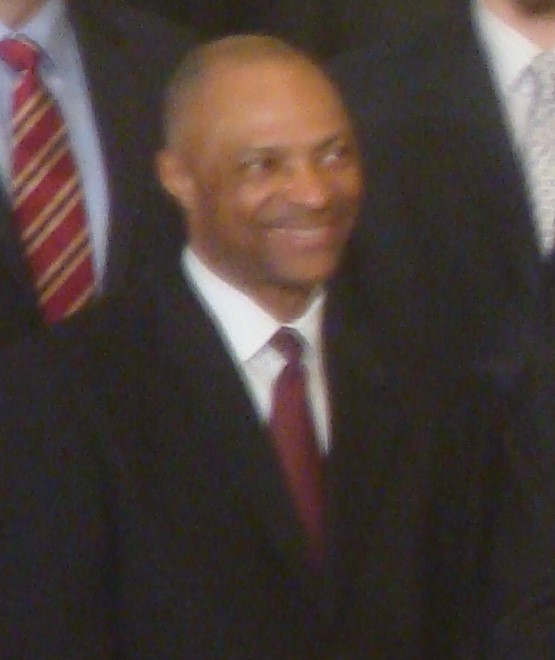

Personal information
- Born: September 13, 1949 (age 77) Lincolnton, North Carolina, U.S.
- Listed height: 6 ft 3 in (1.91 m)
- Listed weight: 185 lb (84 kg)

Career information
- High school: Linden-McKinley (Columbus, Ohio)
- College: Ohio State (1968–1971)
- NBA draft: 1971: 1st round, 13th overall pick
- Drafted by: Los Angeles Lakers
- Playing career: 1971–1980
- Position: Shooting guard / point guard
- Number: 11, 5, 35, 33
- Coaching career: 1982–2018

Career history

Playing
- 1971–1972: Los Angeles Lakers
- 1972–1977: Cleveland Cavaliers
- 1977–1979: New York Knicks
- 1979–1980: Washington Bullets

Coaching
- 1982–1983: Furman (assistant)
- 1983–1987: Ohio State (assistant)
- 1987–1989: Youngstown State
- 1989–1996: Chicago Bulls (assistant)
- 1996–1997: Dallas Mavericks
- 1998–1999: Chicago Condors
- 1999–2004: Los Angeles Lakers (assistant)
- 2004–2006: New Orleans Hornets (assistant)
- 2006–2011: Los Angeles Lakers (assistant)
- 2011–2012: Zhejiang Guangsha
- 2013–2014: Milwaukee Bucks (assistant)
- 2014–2016: New York Knicks (assistant)
- 2017–2018: Yeshiva University of Los Angeles (assistant)

Career highlights
- As player: NBA champion (1972); NBA All-Defensive Second Team (1976); First-team All-Big Ten (1971); As assistant coach: 9× NBA champion (1991–1993, 1996, 2000–2002, 2009, 2010)

Career statistics
- Points: 5,412 (8.3 ppg)
- Rebounds: 1,981 (3.0 rpg)
- Assists: 2,531 (3.9 apg)
- Stats at NBA.com
- Stats at Basketball Reference

James Mitchell Cleamons (born September 13, 1949) is an American former professional basketball player in the National Basketball Association (NBA), with the Los Angeles Lakers, Cleveland Cavaliers, New York Knicks, and Washington Bullets. In the 1975–76 season, he was selected to the second-team NBA All-Defensive Team. As a rookie, he was a member of the Lakers' 1972 NBA championship team that won a league record 33 consecutive games.

Cleamons played college basketball for the Ohio State Buckeyes. In 1971, he was named the Big Ten Conference's Most Valuable Player, and was selected first-team All-Big Ten; after having been named second-team All-Big Ten in 1970.

Cleamons has coached basketball in the NBA and at the college and high school levels, as an assistant and head coach. Cleamons was an assistant coach to head coach Phil Jackson on nine NBA championship teams with the Chicago Bulls and Los Angeles Lakers.

== Early life ==
Cleamons was born on September 13, 1949, in Lincolnton, North Carolina. He grew up in Columbus, Ohio, and graduated from Linden-McKinley High School in 1967. In 1967, he played on an Ohio state Class AA championship basketball team at Linden-McKinley; scoring 18 points in the championship game.

As a junior in 1966, Cleamons was an Associated Press (AP) honorable mention All-Central District Class AA in basketball. The AP named him first-team All-District Class AA in 1967.

== College ==
Cleamons attended Ohio State University in Columbus, earning a degree in education. Ohio State Buckeyes' basketball coach Fred Taylor first saw Cleamons at a high school game in Columbus, and liked the way he moved as a basketball player (even though Cleamons was not considered the top player at Linden-McKinley). Cleamons originally wanted to go to college away from home, but Taylor persuaded him to attend Ohio State. Cleamons played for the Buckeyes' basketball team as a swingman. He played forward as a sophomore and junior, and point guard his senior year (1970–71). In 1970–71, he was team captain and leader of the Buckeyes team that won the Big Ten championship.

As a sophomore (1968–69), Cleamons averaged 16.6 points and 7.4 rebounds per game, second to teammate Dave Sorenson in both categories. As a junior (1969–70), he averaged 21.6 points and eight rebounds per game, again second to Sorenson on the Buckeyes. He is reported to have led the Big Ten in field goal percentage (.598) in 1969–70. In 1970 as a junior, the Associated Press selected Cleamons second-team All-Big Ten.

As a senior (1970–71), Cleamons was selected as the Big Ten's Most Valuable Player, and the AP named him first-team All-Big Ten. He was third on the Buckeyes in scoring (17.4 points per game) and second in rebounding (6.3 rebounds per game). Cleamons, the only senior on that Buckeyes' team, was described as "the 'quarterback' of the Ohio State scheme" that season, and the individual who kept the team's play in order. Coach Taylor said that having Cleamons was like having another coach on the floor.

In the 1970–71 season, the Buckeyes had a 20–6 record overall. In the 1971 NCAA tournament, the Buckeyes defeated Marquette in the regional semifinals, 60–59; but lost to Western Kentucky in overtime at the regional finals, 81–78. Cleamons was high scorer among all players in the Marquette game, with 21 points. He had 12 points and seven rebounds in the loss to Western Kentucky, but spent most of the second half of that game on the bench with four personal fouls. Cleamons made three of his field goals in the overtime period. Ohio State finished the season ranked 10th in the nation by the Associated Press (AP).

Over his three-year career with the Buckeyes, Cleamons averaged 18.5 points and 7.3 rebounds per game.

== Playing career ==
=== Los Angeles Lakers ===
Cleamons was selected by the Los Angeles Lakers with the 13th pick of the 1971 NBA draft. He was also selected in the fourth round of the 1971 American Basketball Association draft by the Indiana Pacers. Cleamons chose the NBA, and had a nine-year NBA career for four teams (the Lakers, the Cleveland Cavaliers, the New York Knicks, and the Washington Bullets).

In 1971-72, Cleamons was the only rookie playing on a Lakers team that won 33 straight games, finished the regular season 69–13, and won the NBA championship. It is considered one of the greatest teams in league history. As back-up point guard to future Hall of Fame player Jerry West, Cleamons averaged only 5.3 minutes per game.

=== Cleveland Cavaliers ===
In August 1972, the Lakers traded Cleamons to the Cleveland Cavaliers for a second round draft pick. On hearing he was traded, Cleamons cried. Cleamons came to be known as a defensive specialist and playmaker in Cleveland over his career there. He was a part-time player during his first two years in Cleveland. Cleamons played in 80 games in 1972–73, averaging 17.4 minutes, 5.7 points, 2.6 assists and 2.1 rebounds per game. The next season, he played in 81 games, averaging over 20 minutes per game, and seven points, 2.8 assists and 2.8 rebounds per game. In the 1974-75 season he became the Cavaliers starting point guard. Cleamons averaged 36.4 minutes, 11.9 points, 5.1 assists, 4.4 rebounds and 1.1 steals per game, in 74 games.

Cleamons started every Cavaliers' game in the 1975-76 season, averaging a career high 12.2 points per game, along with 4.3 rebounds and 5.2 assists per game. In 1976, Cleamons was selected to the NBA All-Defensive second team. This was the Cavaliers first truly successful squad in its six-year history, and became known as the "Miracle of Richfield" team under coach Bill Fitch. Cleamons was a key young player on a team that included a focus on "dogged defense".

The Cavaliers finished the regular season 49–33, and were first in the NBA Central Division. The Cavaliers won the Eastern Conference playoff semifinals over the Washington Bullets in a dramatic seven game series decided by two points in the final game. Cleamons' most memorable play as a Cavalier came in Game 5 of the Bullets series, when he grabbed a Bingo Smith air ball and put in the game-winning layup in the game's last seconds.

Cleamons averaged nearly 38 minutes per games against the Bullets over the seven game playoff series. He averaged 12.6 points, 4.6 assists, and 4.1 rebounds per game. The Cavaliers then lost in six games to the eventual NBA champion Boston Celtics in the Eastern Conference finals. Cleamons averaged 39.7 minutes, 15.2 points, 4.8 assists, and seven rebounds per game against the Celtics, leading the Cavaliers in scoring during that series.

Cleamons suffered a groin injury during the 1976–77 Cavaliers' season, and played in only 60 games, starting all 60 of those games. He averaged 34.1 minutes, 10.4 points, 5.1 assists, and 4.6 rebounds per game. The team finished 43–39, and lost a three-game first-round playoff series to the Bullets, in which Cleamons did not play.

=== New York Knicks and Washington Bullets ===
Cleamons signed as a free agent with the New York Knicks in October 1977, with the Cavaliers receiving the 32-year old Walt Frazier as compensation. He was the first Knick to make a three-point field goal in the regular season (October 18, 1979). Cleamons played two full seasons with the Knicks. In 1977–78, he played in 79 games for the Knicks, starting 44, and averaging 25.4 minutes, 6.5 points, 3.6 assists and 2.7 rebounds per game. He started 71 games the following season with the Knicks, averaging 30.3 minutes, 9.5 points, 4.8 assists and 2.8 rebounds per game.

In early December 1979, the Knicks traded Cleamons to the Bullets for a 1981 third round draft pick. Before being traded, he played in 22 games for the Knicks as a reserve, averaging less than 12 minutes per game. With the Bullets, Cleamons averaged 26.9 minutes per game in 57 games, averaging 7.8 points, 4.4 assists and 2.3 rebounds per game, in what was his final NBA season as a player. The Bullets made him available in the NBA's 1980 expansion draft, and Cleamons was selected by the Dallas Mavericks. Cleamons was not on the Mavericks' roster during their inaugural season.

Over his nine year NBA career, Cleamons averaged 26.1 minutes, 8.3 points, 3.9 assists and three rebounds per game. His playing height and weight as an NBA player are listed as 6 ft 3 in (1.91m), 185 pounds (84 kg).

== Coaching career ==
After retiring as a player, Cleamons began coaching at the college level. He was an assistant coach at Furman (1982–83) and Ohio State (1983-1987), and became head coach at Youngstown State from 1987-89, where his teams were 12–44.

Cleamons had been a teammate of Phil Jackson when they played together with the Knicks. They both knew basketball and had "basketball chemistry" in discussing the game. A decade later, in 1989, when Jackson became head coach of the Chicago Bulls he invited Cleamons to join his staff and Cleamons eventually did so. He would be Jackon's assistant on nine NBA championship teams with the Bulls and Lakers, coaching both Michael Jordan and Kobe Bryant (among others).

Cleamons worked as an assistant coach for the Bulls from 1989 to 1996. He was the head coach of the Dallas Mavericks for slightly over one year, from 1996 to 1997, where he was unsuccessful in utilizing the triangle offense. He then was the head coach of the Chicago Condors of the American Basketball league, a short-lived women's professional basketball league in the mid-1990s.

He was Jackson's assistant coach again with the Lakers, from 1999-2004 and 2006-11. Between the two periods with the Lakers, he was an assistant with the New Orleans/Oklahoma City Hornets (2004-2006). In 2011, Cleamons became a coach in the Chinese Basketball Association. In 2013, he became an assistant with the Milwaukee Bucks for one season. For a few games during his tenure with the Lakers, he served as acting head coach while Phil Jackson was absent.

In 2014, Jackson, who had become the Knicks' president, hired Cleamons to join the New York Knicks coaching staff under Derek Fisher. He was an assistant coach for the Knicks for two seasons.

In 2017, Cleamons accepted a position as an assistant coach for the Yeshiva University of Los Angeles (YULA) high school boys basketball team. He was not on the coaching staff for the 2019-2020 season.

== Honors ==
In 1984, he was inducted into the Ohio State Hall of Fame. In 2008, he was inducted into the Ohio Basketball Hall of Fame. In 2019, he was inducted into the Ohio High School Circle of Champions.

== Personal life ==
Cleamons and his wife Cheryl have two daughters, Imani and Rose. In late 2019 and early 2020, Cleamons served as an NBA basketball ambassador in Africa and Australia. In 2020, he and his wife returned to live in Columbus. He coached the Ohio team in the 2022 HCBU College Basketball All Star Game. Since moving back to Columbus he has served as a motivational speaker and basketball instructor to high school youth. He was the subject of a 2022 episode of Legacy List with Matt Paxton.

== Career playing statistics ==
Legend
GP	Games played	GS	Games started	MPG	Minutes per game
FG%	Field goal percentage	3P%	3-point field goal percentage	FT%	Free throw percentage
RPG	Rebounds per game	APG	Assists per game	SPG	Steals per game
BPG	Blocks per game	PPG	Points per game	**Bold**	Career high
†	Won an NBA championship

=== NBA ===
==== Regular season ====
Year	Team	GP	GS	MPG	FG%	3P%	FT%	RPG	APG	SPG	BPG	PPG
1971–72†	L.A. Lakers	38		5.3	.350		.778	1.0	.9			2.6
1972–73	Cleveland	80		17.4	.454		.743	2.1	2.6			5.7
1973–74	Cleveland	81		20.3	.433		.699	2.8	2.8	.8	.2	7.0
1974–75	Cleveland	74		**36.4**	.480		.796	4.4	5.1	1.1	.3	11.9
1975–76	Cleveland	**82**	**82**	34.6	.466		.798	4.3	**5.2**	**1.5**	.2	**12.2**
1976–77	Cleveland	60		34.1	.434		.757	**4.6**	5.1	1.1	**.4**	10.4
1977–78	New York	79	44	25.4	.480		.786	2.7	3.6	.9	.2	6.5
1978–79	New York	79	71	30.3	.473		.760	2.8	4.8	.9	.1	9.5
1979–80	New York	22	0	11.5	.435	**.375**	**.800**	.9	1.8	.6	.1	3.4
1979–80	Washington	57		26.9	.483	.174	.735	2.3	4.4	.8	.2	7.8
Career		652	197	26.1	.460	.226	.765	3.0	3.9	1.0	.2	8.3

==== Playoffs ====
Year	Team	GP	MPG	FG%	3P%	FT%	RPG	APG	SPG	BPG	PPG
1972†	L.A. Lakers	6	2.8	**.571**		–	.7	.7			1.3
1976	Cleveland	**13**	**38.7**	.397		.825	**5.5**	**4.7**	**.6**	**.2**	**13.8**
1978	New York	6	21.2	.389		**1.000**	2.2	3.8	.5	.0	5.7
1980	Washington	2	10.0	.000	–	–	.5	.5	.5	.0	.0
Career		27	24.7	.396	–	.848	3.3	3.3	.6	.1	8.2

== Head coaching record ==
=== College ===
Record table
Season	Team	Overall	Conference	Standing	Postseason
Youngstown State Penguins (Ohio Valley Conference) (1987–1988)
1987–88	Youngstown State	7–21	2–12	7th	
Youngstown State (Independent) (1988–1989)
1988–89	Youngstown State	5–23			
Youngstown State:		12–44 (.214)	2–12 (.143)		
Total:		12–44 (.214)			
National champion Postseason invitational champion Conference regular season champion Conference regular season and conference tournament champion Division regular season champion Division regular season and conference tournament champion Conference tournament champion

=== NBA ===
Legend
Regular season	G	Games coached	W	Games won	L	Games lost	W–L %	Win–loss %
Playoffs	PG	Playoff games	PW	Playoff wins	PL	Playoff losses	PW–L %	Playoff win–loss %

Team	Year	G	W	L	W–L%	Finish	PG	PW	PL	PW–L%	Result
Dallas	1996–97	82	24	58	.293	5th in Midwest	—	—	—	—	Missed Playoffs
Dallas	1997–98	16	4	12	.250	(fired)	—	—	—	—	—
Career		98	28	70	.286		—	—	—	—	
