= 1978–79 Cleveland Cavaliers season =

NBA professional basketball team season

- Head coach: Bill Fitch
- Arena: Coliseum at Richfield

Results
- Record: 30–52 (.366)
- Place: Division: 4th (Central); Conference: 8th (Eastern)
- Playoff finish: Did not qualify
- Stats at Basketball Reference

Local media
- Television: WJKW
- Radio: WWWE

The 1978–79 Cleveland Cavaliers season was the ninth season of the franchise in the National Basketball Association (NBA).

== Roster ==
1978–79 Cleveland Cavaliers roster
Players

Pos.	No.	Player	Height	Weight	DOB	From
PF	52	Jim Brewer	6 ft 9 in (2.06 m)	210 lb (95 kg)	December 3, 1951	Minnesota
SG	34	Austin Carr	6 ft 4 in (1.93 m)	200 lb (91 kg)	March 10, 1948	Notre Dame
C	22	Jim Chones	6 ft 11 in (2.11 m)	220 lb (100 kg)	November 30, 1949	Marquette
SF	40	Harry Davis	6 ft 7 in (2.01 m)	220 lb (100 kg)	January 27, 1956	Florida State
PG	11	Walt Frazier	6 ft 4 in (1.93 m)	200 lb (91 kg)	March 29, 1945	Southern Illinois
SG	25	Terry Furlow	6 ft 4 in (1.93 m)	190 lb (86 kg)	October 18, 1954	Michigan State
PG	1	Kenny Higgs	6 ft 0 in (1.83 m)	180 lb (82 kg)	January 31, 1955	LSU
PF	24	John Lambert	6 ft 10 in (2.08 m)	225 lb (102 kg)	January 14, 1953	USC
PG	15	Butch Lee	6 ft 0 in (1.83 m)	185 lb (84 kg)	December 5, 1956	Marquette
SF	30	Mike Mitchell	6 ft 7 in (2.01 m)	215 lb (98 kg)	January 1, 1956	Auburn
SF	20	Campy Russell	6 ft 8 in (2.03 m)	215 lb (98 kg)	January 12, 1952	Michigan
SG	7	Bingo Smith	6 ft 5 in (1.96 m)	195 lb (88 kg)	February 26, 1946	Tulsa
C	3	Elmore Smith	7 ft 0 in (2.13 m)	250 lb (113 kg)	May 9, 1949	Kentucky State
PG	14	Foots Walker	6 ft 0 in (1.83 m)	184 lb (83 kg)	May 21, 1951	West Georgia

Coaches
Head coach
- Stan Albeck
Assistant(s)
- Morris McHone

Legend
- (DP) Unsigned draft pick
- (FA) Free agent
- (S) Suspended
- Injured

== Season standings ==
Central Division	W	L	PCT	GB	Home	Road	Div
y-San Antonio Spurs	48	34	.585	–	29–12	19–22	11–9
x-Houston Rockets	47	35	.573	1	30–11	17–24	12–8
x-Atlanta Hawks	46	36	.561	2	34–7	12–29	14–6
Cleveland Cavaliers	30	52	.366	18	20–21	10–31	6–14
Detroit Pistons	30	52	.366	18	22–19	8–33	9–11
New Orleans Jazz	26	56	.317	22	21–20	8–33	9–15

#	Eastern Conference				
#	Team	W	L	PCT	GB
1	z-Washington Bullets	54	28	.659	–
2	y-San Antonio Spurs	48	34	.585	6
3	x-Philadelphia 76ers	47	35	.573	7
4	x-Houston Rockets	47	35	.573	7
5	x-Atlanta Hawks	46	36	.561	8
6	x-New Jersey Nets	37	45	.451	17
7	New York Knicks	31	51	.378	23
8	Cleveland Cavaliers	30	52	.366	24
8	Detroit Pistons	30	52	.366	24
10	Boston Celtics	29	53	.354	25
11	New Orleans Jazz	26	56	.317	28

Notes

- z, y – division champions
- x – clinched playoff spot

== Game log ==
1978–79 game log
Total: 30–52 (Home: 20–21; Road: 10–31)
October: 4–4 (home: 3–2; road: 1–2)

Game	Date	Team	Score	High points	High rebounds	High assists	Location Attendance	Record

November: 3–11 (home: 1–5; road: 2–6)

Game	Date	Team	Score	High points	High rebounds	High assists	Location Attendance	Record
21	November 28, 1978	Atlanta	W 112–98				Coliseum at Richfield; 4,130	7–14

December: 7–6 (home: 6–2; road: 1–4)

Game	Date	Team	Score	High points	High rebounds	High assists	Location Attendance	Record
33	December 23, 1978	@ Atlanta	L 91–109				The Omni; 6,215	12–21

January: 6–8 (home: 4–3; road: 2–5)

Game	Date	Team	Score	High points	High rebounds	High assists	Location Attendance	Record

February: 6–8 (home: 4–3; road: 2–5)

Game	Date	Team	Score	High points	High rebounds	High assists	Location Attendance	Record
59	February 20, 1979	Atlanta	L 109–119				Coliseum at Richfield; 6,523	24–35

March: 3–11 (home: 1–5; road: 2–6)

Game	Date	Team	Score	High points	High rebounds	High assists	Location Attendance	Record
72	March 20, 1979	@ Atlanta	L 109–115				The Omni; 6,384	28–44

April: 1–4 (home: 1–1; road: 0–3)

Game	Date	Team	Score	High points	High rebounds	High assists	Location Attendance	Record

1978–79 schedule
