= Fred Foster (basketball) =

American basketball player (1946–1985)

Personal information
- Born: March 18, 1946 Springfield, Ohio, U.S.
- Died: October 4, 1985 (aged 39) Springfield, Ohio, U.S.
- Listed height: 6 ft 5 in (1.96 m)
- Listed weight: 210 lb (95 kg)

Career information
- High school: South (Springfield, Ohio)
- College: Miami (Ohio) (1965–1968)
- NBA draft: 1968: 3rd round, 28th overall pick
- Drafted by: Cincinnati Royals
- Playing career: 1968–1977
- Position: Small forward
- Number: 15, 25, 24, 5

Career history
- 1968–1970: Cincinnati Royals
- 1970–1972: Philadelphia 76ers
- 1972–1973: Detroit Pistons
- 1973–1975: Cleveland Cavaliers
- 1976–1977: Buffalo Braves

Career highlights
- MAC Player of the Year (1968); 2× First-team All-MAC (1967, 1968)

Career NBA statistics
- Points: 4,093 (7.8 ppg)
- Rebounds: 1,275 (2.4 rpg)
- Assists: 601 (1.1 apg)
- Stats at NBA.com
- Stats at Basketball Reference

Fred J. Foster (March 18, 1946 – October 4, 1985) was an American professional basketball player.

== Early life ==
Foster grew up in Springfield, Ohio, and attended Springfield South High School.

== College career ==
Foster played as a 6'5" forward at Miami University. After averaging only 3.4 points per game as a sophomore, as a junior he exploded for 21.3 points and 10.1 rebounds per game and was named first-team All-Mid-American Conference. In his senior season of 1967–68, he earned the first-ever Mid-American Conference Player of the Year award and set a school record that still stands—the all-time single-season points-per-game average with 26.9 in 1967–68, ahead of the 24.9 of basketball hall-of-famer Wayne Embry and NBA world champion Ron Harper. His single-game high was 43 points against Ball State University on December 2, 1967. Foster also averaged 12.5 rebounds per game that year, sixth in Miami history.

Foster ranks third in Miami history in career points per game at 18.8 and seventh in career rebounds per game at 8.9 from 1966 to 1968. He had a career field goal percentage of .484.

== NBA career ==
He was drafted in the third round of the 1968 NBA draft by the Cincinnati Royals and was also selected in the 1968 American Basketball Association draft by the Kentucky Colonels.

In his rookie season with the Royals, Foster made his debut on October 19, 1968, as the Royals' last man in a win over the Detroit Pistons. For the season, he averaged 3.4 points per game.

Foster came on strong in his second season, 1969–70, when he averaged 14.8 points and 4.8 rebounds per game, both career highs. He also had career highs in minutes per game (28.1) and field goal percentage (.449). He twice had a single-game career best of 32 points—on January 7, 1970, against the Milwaukee Bucks when he made 13 field goals and was 6-for-6 at the free throw line, and again on February 15 against the San Diego Rockets.

In 1970–71, after playing one game with the Royals, he was traded along with Connie Dierking to the Philadelphia 76ers for Darrall Imhoff and a future draft pick. For the season, Foster averaged 5.5 points and 2.3 rebounds per game.

In 1971–72, he was a steady contributor, averaging 23 minutes per game and 11.9 points and 3.7 rebounds per game. He had a season-high 30 points on February 10, 1972, against the Golden State Warriors.

Prior to the 1972–73 season, on July 31, 1972, Foster was traded to the Portland Trail Blazers for a future draft pick, then on the same day Portland traded him to the Detroit Pistons for Terry Dischinger. In 23.2 minutes per game, he averaged 8.7 points per game.

On October 8, 1973, he was waived by the Pistons and three weeks later signed as a free agent with the Cleveland Cavaliers for the 1973–74 season, averaging 4.8 points per game. In 1974–75, he upped his average to 6.9 points per game.

He did not play in the 1975–76 season, and in 1976–77 he returned to the NBA, signing as a free agent with the Buffalo Braves, for whom he averaged 3.9 points per game in his eighth and final NBA season.

== Personal life ==
Foster died in 1985 at age 39 in his hometown of Springfield, Ohio. In 1998, he was posthumously inducted into the Miami Athletics Hall of Fame. In 2017, he was enshrined into the Ohio Basketball Hall of Fame. His sister accepted his posthumous award on behalf of their family.

== Career statistics ==
Legend
GP	Games played	GS	Games started	MPG	Minutes per game
FG%	Field goal percentage	3P%	3-point field goal percentage	FT%	Free throw percentage
RPG	Rebounds per game	APG	Assists per game	SPG	Steals per game
BPG	Blocks per game	PPG	Points per game	**Bold**	Career high

=== NBA ===
==== Regular season ====
Year	Team	GP	GS	MPG	FG%	FT%	RPG	APG	SPG	BPG	PPG
1968–69	Cincinnati	56		8.9	.383	.652	1.1	.6			3.4
1969–70	Cincinnati	**74**		**28.1**	**.449**	.724	**4.2**	1.4			**14.8**
1970–71	Cincinnati	1		21.0	.375	.333	4.0	.0			7.0
1970–71	Philadelphia	66	6	13.5	.403	.699	2.2	.9			5.5
1971–72	Philadelphia	**74**	**14**	23.0	.415	.761	3.7	1.2			11.9
1972–73	Detroit	63		23.2	.388	.701	2.9	**1.5**			8.7
1973–74	Cleveland	58		11.2	.389	**.844**	1.9	1.1	**.3**	**.1**	4.8
1974–75	Cleveland	73		15.6	.417	.711	1.5	1.4	**.3**	.0	6.9
1976–77	Buffalo	59		11.7	.401	.682	1.3	.8	**.3**	.0	3.9
Career		524	14	17.4	.414	.727	2.4	1.3	.3	.0	7.8

==== Playoffs ====
Year	Team	GP	MPG	FG%	FT%	RPG	APG	PPG
1971	Philadelphia	5	9.8	.421	1.000	2.4	1.0	3.6
