= Jim Brewer (basketball) =

American basketball player (born 1951)

Personal information
- Born: December 3, 1951 (age 74) Maywood, Illinois, U.S.
- Listed height: 6 ft 9 in (2.06 m)
- Listed weight: 210 lb (95 kg)

Career information
- High school: Proviso East (Maywood, Illinois)
- College: Minnesota (1970–1973)
- NBA draft: 1973: 1st round, 2nd overall pick
- Drafted by: Cleveland Cavaliers
- Playing career: 1973–1985
- Position: Power forward
- Number: 52, 42, 40, 8

Career history
- 1973–1979: Cleveland Cavaliers
- 1979: Detroit Pistons
- 1979–1980: Portland Trail Blazers
- 1980–1982: Los Angeles Lakers
- 1982–1985: Ford / Jollycolombani Cantù

Career highlights
- NBA champion (1982); 2× NBA All-Defensive Second Team (1976, 1977); EuroLeague champion (1983); Consensus second-team All-American (1973); First-team All-Big Ten (1973); Second-team All-Big Ten (1971); No. 52 retired by Minnesota Golden Gophers

Career NBA statistics
- Points: 4,099 (5.8 ppg)
- Rebounds: 4,458 (6.3 rpg)
- Assists: 1,038 (1.5 apg)
- Stats at NBA.com
- Stats at Basketball Reference
Medals
Men's basketball
Representing United States
Olympic Games
| Silver medal – second place | 1972 Munich | Team |

James Turner Brewer (born December 3, 1951) is an American former professional National Basketball Association (NBA) player.

Brewer was the first notable player to come out of Proviso East High School, which has one of the most successful high school basketball programs in Illinois. In 1969, Brewer, playing center, led his team to the first of four state championships. Brewer was followed at Proviso East by other future NBA players, notably Doc Rivers, Michael Finley, Dee Brown, Shannon Brown, Sterling Brown, and Jevon Carter.

The 6'9", 210-pound forward then attended the University of Minnesota. One of his teammates was future Baseball Hall-of-Famer Dave Winfield. He is infamous for his role in a 1972 brawl in Minneapolis, where white Ohio State center Luke Witte was assaulted by fellow Gophers Corky Taylor and Ron Behagen in a game. The fight escalated when Brewer repeatedly struck Witte's white teammate Dave Merchant in the face.

Brewer played in the 1972 Summer Olympics, including the United States' controversial loss to the Soviet Union in the gold medal game, being violently injured by Alexander Belov during the free-throw in the second half and unable to continue playing. The referees failed to properly assess the flagrant foul. After the Olympics, Brewer was drafted by the Cleveland Cavaliers in the first round (2nd pick) of the 1973 NBA draft.

Whenever Brewer scored a basket at a Cavaliers home game, the public address announcer would declare, "Two for the Brew!" Brewer played nine seasons in the NBA from 1973 to 1982. Then he played with Pallacanestro Cantù in Italian Serie A along with players as Pierluigi Marzorati and Antonello Riva with coach Giancarlo Primo. He won a Euroleague and was an Intercontinental Cup finalist.

Brewer is the uncle of former NBA player and current Milwaukee Bucks head coach Glenn "Doc" Rivers and the great-uncle of Doc's son, former NBA point guard, Austin Rivers.

In 2007, the Illinois High School Association named Brewer one of the 100 Legends of the IHSA Boys Basketball Tournament.

== Career statistics ==
Legend
| GP | Games played | GS | Games started | MPG | Minutes per game |
| FG% | Field goal percentage | 3P% | 3-point field goal percentage | FT% | Free throw percentage |
| RPG | Rebounds per game | APG | Assists per game | SPG | Steals per game |
| BPG | Blocks per game | PPG | Points per game | **Bold** | Career high |
| † | Won an NBA championship | * | Led the league |

=== NBA ===
==== Regular season ====
| Year | Team | GP | GS | MPG | FG% | 3P% | FT% | RPG | APG | SPG | BPG | PPG |
|---|---|---|---|---|---|---|---|---|---|---|---|---|
| 1973–74 | Cleveland | **82*** | | 22.7 | .383 | | .650 | 6.4 | 1.8 | .6 | .4 | 6.1 |
| 1974–75 | Cleveland | **82** | | 24.3 | .455 | | .648 | 6.2 | 1.6 | .9 | .5 | 8.4 |
| 1975–76 | Cleveland | **82** | **82** | **35.5** | .458 | | **.654** | **10.9** | **2.5** | 1.1 | **1.1** | **11.5** |
| 1976–77 | Cleveland | 81 | | 33.0 | .451 | | .545 | 9.4 | 2.4 | **1.2** | 1.0 | 8.5 |
| 1977–78 | Cleveland | 80 | | 22.5 | .449 | | .460 | 6.2 | 1.2 | .8 | .6 | 5.0 |
| 1978–79 | Cleveland | 55 | | 23.7 | .440 | | .479 | 6.7 | 1.3 | .9 | 1.0 | 4.6 |
| 1978–79 | Detroit | 25 | | 12.4 | .450 | | .200 | 4.2 | .5 | .5 | .4 | 2.3 |
| 1979–80 | Portland | 67 | | 15.2 | .489 | .000 | .483 | 3.8 | 1.1 | .6 | .6 | 2.9 |
| 1980–81 | L.A. Lakers | 78 | | 14.2 | **.513** | .000 | .375 | 3.6 | .7 | .6 | .7 | 2.8 |
| 1981–82† | L.A. Lakers | 71 | 9 | 13.6 | .463 | **.167** | .368 | 3.7 | .6 | .5 | .6 | 2.4 |
| Career | | 703 | 91 | 22.7 | .448 | .077 | .571 | 6.3 | 1.5 | .8 | .7 | 5.8 |

==== Playoffs ====
| Year | Team | GP | MPG | FG% | 3P% | FT% | RPG | APG | SPG | BPG | PPG |
|---|---|---|---|---|---|---|---|---|---|---|---|
| 1976 | Cleveland | **13** | 37.6 | .436 | | .542 | 10.8 | **2.8** | 1.0 | .9 | **8.8** |
| 1977 | Cleveland | 3 | **37.7** | .407 | | **1.000** | **12.0** | 1.7 | 1.3 | **1.3** | 7.7 |
| 1978 | Cleveland | 1 | 9.0 | .000 | | .000 | .0 | .0 | .0 | .0 | .0 |
| 1980 | Portland | 3 | 22.3 | **1.000** | – | .333 | 5.3 | 1.0 | **1.7** | .7 | 7.0 |
| 1981 | L.A. Lakers | 3 | 2.3 | – | – | – | .3 | .0 | .0 | .0 | .0 |
| 1982† | L.A. Lakers | 8 | 7.1 | .500 | | – | 1.4 | .5 | .3 | .8 | .8 |
| Career | | 31 | 23.9 | .469 | – | .519 | 6.6 | 1.6 | .8 | .8 | 5.3 |
