= Luke Witte =

American basketball player (born 1950)

Personal information
- Born: October 19, 1950 (age 76) Philadelphia, Pennsylvania, U.S.
- Listed height: 7 ft 0 in (2.13 m)
- Listed weight: 235 lb (107 kg)

Career information
- High school: Marlington (Alliance, Ohio)
- College: Ohio State (1970–1973)
- NBA draft: 1973: 4th round, 57th overall pick
- Drafted by: Cleveland Cavaliers
- Playing career: 1973–1976
- Position: Center
- Number: 44

Career history
- 1973–1976: Cleveland Cavaliers

Career highlights
- First-team All-Big Ten (1971)
- Stats at NBA.com
- Stats at Basketball Reference

Luke Witte (born October 19, 1950) is an American former college and professional basketball player who is now a church minister. He played at the collegiate level for Ohio State University and professionally for the Cleveland Cavaliers. It was during his time at Ohio State that he was severely injured in one of the more brutal on-court brawls in basketball history.

== High school and college ==
Witte was a standout player at Marlington High School in Alliance, Ohio, where he scored over 1500 points during his career. He was a 1st team Class AA All-Ohio selection after his senior season. He was joined on the 1st team by future Ohio State teammates, Allan Hornyak (Bellaire St. John's) and Dave Merchant (Marion Harding).

He went on to the Ohio State University, where, as a sophomore, in 1971 led the team in rebounds (331 for the season) and was all-Big Ten. The Ohio State team were Big Ten champions, and teamed with fellow Buckeye standouts Allan Hornyak and Jim Cleamons. The 1971 Ohio State team defeated Marquette in the NCAA Tournament Mid-East regional semifinal before losing to Western Kentucky.

== Brawl in Minnesota ==
Witte is best known for the incident at the Ohio State–Minnesota game, played at Minnesota on January 25, 1972. According to the Big Ten Conference's review of the game film, Witte appeared to elbow Minnesota guard Bobby Nix as the two teams headed to their locker rooms at halftime. During the second half, Ohio State led 50–44 with 36 seconds to go when Witte went for a layup but was fouled hard. Immediately following the foul, Minnesota player Corky Taylor extended an arm to help Witte up, then kneed Witte in the groin and punched him in the head. While on the floor, he was also kicked and stomped by Minnesota player Ron Behagen, knocking him unconscious.

What followed was an extended brawl. Witte's teammate, Dave Merchant, attempted to come to his aid, but was struck in the face several times by Gopher Jim Brewer. Another Buckeye, Mark Wagar, was attacked from behind by Minnesota player—and future Major League Baseball Hall of Famer—Dave Winfield, who landed four or five punches to Wagar's head.

When order was restored, Minnesota Athletic Director Paul Giel announced the game was over and the Buckeyes were a 50–44 victor, prompting Minnesota fans to boo and throw objects as Witte was carried from the floor. Hospitalized for several days, including 24 hours in intensive care, Witte's injuries included 29 facial stitches and a scarred cornea. In all, three Ohio State players were taken to hospitals.

=== Aftermath ===
The Big Ten Conference suspended Taylor and Behagen for the rest of the season. Ohio State head coach Fred Taylor was angered that the universities (including his own), the NCAA, and the Big Ten Conference refused to pursue sanctions against the Minnesota program, and said later that his enthusiasm for the game was lost as a result; he retired early, in 1976. The Minnesota coach, Bill Musselman, was blamed for fostering a thuggish Gopher atmosphere. Musselman denied that he ordered his team to play dirty or to initiate fights. Despite losing two of its key players, Minnesota went on to win the Big Ten championship with an 11–3 record.

Following the incident, the NCAA banned the practice of players performing dunks and slams during pre-game warm-ups when officials are not present. Witte chose not to pursue legal or any other avenue of retribution against his attackers. Instead, he has extended forgiveness and tried to achieve reconciliation.

== Pro career ==
Witte was selected in the fourth round of the 1973 NBA draft by the Cleveland Cavaliers, who also had fellow Buckeyes Hornyak and Jim Cleamons. Minnesota fight participant, Jim Brewer was on the team as well. Witte saw part-time action over three seasons; his 250-pound (110 kg) body spread over 7 feet (2.1 m) was not mobile enough for an NBA then stocked with very good centers. He still suffered from vision impairment as well.

== After basketball ==
Following his career in professional basketball, Luke Witte established his own sporting store in Alliance, Ohio which he operated for more than five years before becoming a minister. Luke Witte is now the Carolinas Division Director with Marketplace Chaplains in Charlotte, North Carolina.

== Career statistics ==
Legend
GP	Games played	GS	Games started	MPG	Minutes per game
FG%	Field goal percentage	3P%	3-point field goal percentage	FT%	Free throw percentage
RPG	Rebounds per game	APG	Assists per game	SPG	Steals per game
BPG	Blocks per game	PPG	Points per game	**Bold**	Career high

=== NBA ===
==== Regular season ====
Year	Team	GP	MPG	FG%	FT%	RPG	APG	SPG	BPG	PPG
1973–74	Cleveland	**57**	**12.8**	**.432**	**.742**	**4.0**	**.7**	**.1**	.4	**4.5**
1974-75	Cleveland	39	6.9	.344	.613	2.4	.4	**.1**	**.6**	2.2
1975-76	Cleveland	22	4.5	.344	.600	1.7	.2	.0	.0	1.4
Career		118	9.3	.402	.685	3.0	.5	.1	.4	3.2

==== Playoffs ====
Year	Team	GP	MPG	FG%	FT%	RPG	APG	SPG	BPG	PPG
1976	Cleveland	7	4.0	.545	1.000	1.3	.6	.0	.0	2.3

== Sources ==
- "Brawl of 35 years ago serves as a warning today", Columbus Dispatch, January 25, 2007
- "Forgiveness," by Dr. Stephen Pattison, Capital City Christian Church Sermons: April 16–17, 2005
- "Parshat Vayechi," by Rabbi Jessica Spitalnic Brockman, Temple Beth El of Boca Paton: December 21, 2002
