= 1974–75 Cleveland Cavaliers season =

NBA professional basketball team season

- Head coach: Bill Fitch
- Arena: Coliseum at Richfield

Results
- Record: 40–42 (.488)
- Place: Division: 3rd (Central); Conference: 6th (Eastern)
- Playoff finish: Did not qualify
- Stats at Basketball Reference

Local media
- Television: WEWS-TV
- Radio: WWWE

The 1974–75 Cleveland Cavaliers season was the fifth season of the franchise in the National Basketball Association (NBA).

== Roster ==
1974–75 Cleveland Cavaliers roster
Players

Pos.	No.	Player	Height	Weight	DOB	From
PF	52	Jim Brewer	6 ft 9 in (2.06 m)	210 lb (95 kg)	1951-12-03	Minnesota
G	34	Austin Carr	6 ft 4 in (1.93 m)	200 lb (91 kg)	1948-03-10	Notre Dame
C	22	Jim Chones	6 ft 11 in (2.11 m)	220 lb (100 kg)	1949-11-30	Marquette
G	35	Jim Cleamons	6 ft 3 in (1.91 m)	185 lb (84 kg)	1949-09-13	Ohio State
C	50	Steve Patterson	6 ft 9 in (2.06 m)	225 lb (102 kg)	1948-06-24	UCLA
G/F	7	Bingo Smith	6 ft 5 in (1.96 m)	195 lb (88 kg)	1946-02-26	Tulsa
SG	10	Dick Snyder	6 ft 5 in (1.96 m)	207 lb (94 kg)	1944-02-01	Davidson
PG	14	Foots Walker	6 ft 0 in (1.83 m)	184 lb (83 kg)	1951-05-21	West Georgia
C	44	Luke Witte	7 ft 0 in (2.13 m)	230 lb (104 kg)	1950-10-19	Ohio State

Coaches
Head coach
- Bill Fitch
Assistant(s)
- Jimmy Rodgers

Legend
- (DP) Unsigned draft pick
- (FA) Free agent
- (S) Suspended
- Injured

== Regular season ==
Central Division	W	L	PCT	GB	Home	Road	Div
y-Washington Bullets	60	22	.732	–	36–5	24–17	22–8
x-Houston Rockets	41	41	.500	19	29–12	12–29	16–14
Cleveland Cavaliers	40	42	.488	20	29–12	11–30	17–13
Atlanta Hawks	31	51	.378	29	22–19	9–32	11–19
New Orleans Jazz	23	59	.280	37	20–21	3–38	9–21

#	Eastern Conference				
#	Team	W	L	PCT	GB
1	z-Boston Celtics	60	22	.732	–
2	y-Washington Bullets	60	22	.732	–
3	x-Buffalo Braves	49	33	.598	11
4	x-Houston Rockets	41	41	.500	19
5	x-New York Knicks	40	42	.488	20
6	Cleveland Cavaliers	40	42	.488	20
7	Philadelphia 76ers	34	48	.415	26
8	Atlanta Hawks	31	51	.378	29
9	New Orleans Jazz	23	59	.280	37

=== Season schedule ===
1974–75 game log
Total: 40–42 (home: 29–12; road: 11–30)
October: 4–4 (home: 1–1; road: 3–3)

Game	Date	Team	Score	High points	High rebounds	High assists	Location Attendance	Record
1	October 18	Portland	129–131 (4OT)	Austin Carr (34)	Jim Chones (19)	Carr, Cleamons (9)	Memorial Coliseum; 11,409	0–1
2	October 19	@ Golden State	110–113	Austin Carr (23)	Jim Chones (12)	Jim Cleamons (9)	Oakland-Alameda County Coliseum Arena; 4,402	0–2
3	October 20	@ Seattle	93–100	Austin Carr (33)	Austin Carr (9)	Smith, Snyder (5)	Seattle Center Coliseum; 10,241	0–3
4	October 23	@ Boston	108–107	Austin Carr (28)	Dwight Davis (7)	Austin Carr (8)	Boston Garden; 7,158	1–3
5	October 24	@ Atlanta	116–97	Austin Carr (25)	Jim Brewer (12)	Jim Cleamons (9)	Omni Coliseum; 4,147	2–3
6	October 26	@ New Orleans	90–88	Austin Carr (23)	Steve Patterson (12)	Austin Carr (7)	Municipal Auditorium; 3,450	3–3
7	October 29	Boston	107–92	Bingo Smith (20)	Steve Patterson (9)	Austin Carr (8)	Richfield Coliseum; 13,184	3–4
8	October 31	Detroit	101–118	Austin Carr (33)	Bingo Smith (7)	Austin Carr (11)	Richfield Coliseum; 5,584	4–4

November: 7–4 (home: 5–0; road: 2–4)

Game	Date	Team	Score	High points	High rebounds	High assists	Location Attendance	Record
9	November 3	Phoenix	101–104	Austin Carr (27)	Steve Patterson (8)	Carr, Smith (5)	Richfield Coliseum; 7,354	5–4
10	November 6	@ Washington	107–99	Bingo Smith (41)	Jim Chones (19)	Austin Carr (6)	Capital Centre; 5,110	6–4
11	November 12	@ Buffalo	94–112	Austin Carr (28)	Dwight Davis (9)	Austin Carr (11)	Buffalo Memorial Auditorium; 7,664	6–5
12	November 14	@ New York	89–94	Dick Snyder (20)	Jim Chones (12)	Jim Cleamons (8)	Madison Square Garden; 15,337	6–6
13	November 16	@ Milwaukee	92–89	Austin Carr (23)	Steve Patterson (8)	Austin Carr (7)	MECCA Arena; 10,938	7–6
14	November 19	@ Houston	85–94	Bingo Smith (16)	Jim Chones (12)	Austin Carr (5)	Hofheinz Pavilion; 2,164	7–7
15	November 21	Golden State	74–106	Austin Carr (26)	Chones, Davis (9)	Jim Cleamons (10)	Richfield Coliseum; 5,811	8–7
16	November 23	New Orleans	100–121	Bingo Smith (25)	Brewer, Smith (10)	Austin Carr (10)	Richfield Coliseum; 8,864	9–7
17	November 24	@ Kansas City–Omaha	94–109	Austin Carr (18)	Dwight Davis (13)	Jim Cleamons (5)	Kemper Arena; 4,555	9–8
18	November 26	Seattle	94–102	Austin Carr (24)	Dwight Davis (12)	Jim Cleamons (7)	Richfield Coliseum; 4,537	10–8
19	November 28	Philadelphia	103–110	Austin Carr (32)	Jim Chones (13)	Dick Snyder (7)	Richfield Coliseum; 6,455	11–8

December: 7–6 (home: 5–3; road: 2–3)

Game	Date	Team	Score	High points	High rebounds	High assists	Location Attendance	Record
20	December 3	Houston	91–97	Dwight Davis (18)	Jim Chones (11)	Jim Cleamons (9)	Richfield Coliseum; 2,971	12–8
21	December 5	Kansas City–Omaha	91–124	Dwight Davis (23)	Jim Chones (9)	Jim Cleamons (9)	Richfield Coliseum; 4,493	13–8
22	December 6	@ Detroit	91–117	Jim Chones (18)	Jim Brewer (6)	Jim Cleamons (8)	Cobo Arena; 4,763	13–9
23	December 8	Washington	88–75	Cleamons, Snyder (14)	Jim Chones (13)	Chones, Walker (4)	Richfield Coliseum; 8,148	13–10
24	December 11	@ Seattle	97–95	Chones, Snyder (18)	Bingo Smith (8)	Jim Cleamons (8)	Seattle Center Coliseum; 10,033	14–10
25	December 13	@ Phoenix	84–85	Jim Chones (22)	Jim Chones (13)	Dick Snyder (6)	Arizona Veterans Memorial Coliseum; 5,756	14–11
26	December 17	@ Los Angeles	119–106	Jim Cleamons (29)	Jim Chones (10)	Dick Snyder (6)	The Forum; 10,009	15–11
27	December 19	Buffalo	104–106	Dwight Davis (20)	Steve Patterson (11)	Jim Cleamons (7)	Richfield Coliseum; 6,876	16–11
28	December 21	Chicago	87–74	Jim Chones (22)	Jim Chones (12)	Jim Cleamons (4)	Richfield Coliseum; 6,871	16–12
29	December 23	New Orleans	79–95	Bingo Smith (15)	Jim Brewer (9)	Jim Cleamons (7)	Richfield Coliseum; 7,867	17–12
30	December 26	Los Angeles	99–89	Jim Chones (28)	Jim Chones (13)	Carr, Cleamons, Davis (5)	Richfield Coliseum; 12,526	17–13
31	December 29	Atlanta	103–110	Jim Chones (25)	Jim Chones (15)	Chones, Snyder, Walker (4)	Richfield Coliseum; 6,670	18–13
32	December 30	@ Washington	90–103	Jim Cleamons (16)	Jim Chones (10)	Cleamons, Walker (5)	Capital Centre; 8,101	18–14

January: 4–12 (home: 3–5; road: 1–7)

Game	Date	Team	Score	High points	High rebounds	High assists	Location Attendance	Record
33	January 3	Houston	83–95	Bingo Smith (20)	Jim Chones (20)	Bingo Smith (10)	Richfield Coliseum; 7,015	19–14
34	January 4	@ New York	102–103	Jim Chones (27)	Jim Chones (15)	Jim Cleamons (7)	Madison Square Garden; 19,694	19–15
35	January 5	Phoenix	86–97	Smith, Snyder (25)	Jim Chones (15)	Jim Cleamons (6)	Richfield Coliseum; 6,831	20–15
36	January 7	@ Atlanta	112–113 (OT)	Jim Cleamons (20)	Jim Brewer (12)	Dick Snyder (7)	Omni Coliseum; 2,973	20–16
37	January 10	@ Buffalo	100–104	Dick Snyder (26)	Jim Brewer (9)	Jim Cleamons (10)	Buffalo Memorial Auditorium; 10,875	20–17
38	January 11	Milwaukee	91–81	Fred Foster (17)	Dwight Davis (11)	Dwight Davis (6)	Richfield Coliseum; 14,314	20–18
39	January 16	Portland	81–89	Dick Snyder (29)	Dwight Davis (11)	Jim Cleamons (6)	Richfield Coliseum; 8,579	21–18
40	January 18	@ Philadelphia	108–106	Cleamons, Davis (24)	Steve Patterson (12)	Dick Snyder (9)	The Spectrum; 6,103	22–18
41	January 19	@ Detroit	98–100	Steve Patterson (23)	Dwight Davis (8)	Jim Cleamons (7)	Cobo Arena; 5,390	22–19
42	January 21	Washington	97–88	Bingo Smith (22)	Steve Patterson (9)	Dick Snyder (10)	Richfield Coliseum; 4,718	22–20
43	January 23	New York	100–89	Dick Snyder (30)	Brewer, Cleamons, Davis, Patterson, Witte (5)	Cleamons, Snyder (4)	Richfield Coliseum; 9,251	22–21
44	January 25	@ Washington	92–94	Dick Snyder (19)	Luke Witte (8)	Davis, Russell, Walker (4)	Capital Centre; 7,178	22–22
45	January 26	Seattle	96–93	Dick Snyder (18)	Steve Patterson (9)	Jim Cleamons (6)	Richfield Coliseum; 4,219	22–23
46	January 28	@ Chicago	97–125	Dwight Davis (22)	Dwight Davis (10)	Jim Cleamons (5)	Chicago Stadium; 5,210	22–24
47	January 30	Buffalo	97–91	Dick Snyder (16)	Jim Chones (13)	Dick Snyder (8)	Richfield Coliseum; 8,046	22–25
48	January 31	@ Boston	99–121	Bingo Smith (32)	Patterson, Smith (6)	Cleamons, Walker (5)	Boston Garden; 15,320	22–26

February: 10–6 (home: 9–1; road: 1–5)

Game	Date	Team	Score	High points	High rebounds	High assists	Location Attendance	Record
49	February 1	Atlanta	109–112 (OT)	Bingo Smith (30)	Davis, Patterson (8)	Foots Walker (7)	Richfield Coliseum; 4,831	23–26
50	February 2	Detroit	96–116	Jim Cleamons (22)	Steve Patterson (10)	Jim Cleamons (10)	Richfield Coliseum; 5,144	24–26
51	February 4	@ Atlanta	97–111	Dick Snyder (24)	Jim Chones (10)	Jim Cleamons (6)	Omni Coliseum; 2,758	24–27
52	February 6	Portland	90–98	Jim Chones (26)	Jim Chones (9)	Jim Cleamons (4)	Richfield Coliseum; 6,243	25–27
53	February 8	Kansas City–Omaha	91–92 (OT)	Dick Snyder (25)	Jim Chones (14)	Foots Walker (8)	Richfield Coliseum; 4,761	26–27
54	February 11	New Orleans	86–100	Bingo Smith (29)	Dwight Davis (9)	Dick Snyder (7)	Richfield Coliseum; 3,788	27–27
55	February 12	@ Philadelphia	105–102	Bingo Smith (28)	Jim Chones (12)	Bingo Smith (9)	The Spectrum; 3,773	28–27
56	February 13	Golden State	93–96	Jim Cleamons (23)	Dwight Davis (10)	Jim Cleamons (7)	Richfield Coliseum; 9,062	29–27
57	February 14	@ Milwaukee	105–112	Bingo Smith (25)	Jim Brewer (13)	Jim Brewer (4)	MECCA Arena; 10,938	29–28
58	February 16	Houston	95–100	Dick Snyder (21)	Jim Chones (7)	Snyder, Walker (5)	Richfield Coliseum; 9,082	30–28
59	February 18	Milwaukee	104–93	Jim Chones (16)	Jim Chones (10)	Foots Walker (6)	Richfield Coliseum; 13,052	30–29
60	February 20	Washington	95–106	Jim Cleamons (17)	Jim Chones (16)	Jim Cleamons (8)	Richfield Coliseum; 6,728	31–29
61	February 23	Atlanta	105–111 (OT)	Fred Foster (19)	Jim Chones (13)	Foots Walker (11)	Richfield Coliseum; 8,777	32–29
62	February 25	@ Houston	87–114	Bingo Smith (20)	Jim Chones (11)	Dick Snyder (6)	Hofheinz Pavilion; 4,723	32–30
63	February 26	@ Phoenix	96–108	Dick Snyder (22)	Foots Walker (7)	Foots Walker (9)	Arizona Veterans Memorial Coliseum; 5,447	32–31
64	February 28	@ Los Angeles	105–109	Dwight Davis (21)	Jim Chones (16)	Foots Walker (11)	The Forum; 11,203	32–32

March: 7–9 (home: 5–2; road: 2–7)

Game	Date	Team	Score	High points	High rebounds	High assists	Location Attendance	Record
65	March 1	@ Golden State	95–110	Fred Foster (18)	Jim Chones (10)	Davis, Walker (4)	Oakland-Alameda County Coliseum Arena; 7,632	32–33
66	March 4	@ Portland	98–117	Campy Russell (15)	Davis, Walker (6)	Foots Walker (7)	Memorial Coliseum; 9,431	32–34
67	March 7	@ Houston	86–93	Jim Chones (22)	Jim Chones (9)	Dick Snyder (6)	Hofheinz Pavilion; 8,876	32–35
68	March 9	@ New Orleans	86–90	Jim Chones (15)	Jim Chones (19)	Brewer, Carr (4)	Municipal Auditorium; 5,031	32–36
69	March 11	New Orleans	114–123	Bingo Smith (28)	Jim Chones (14)	Fred Foster (8)	Richfield Coliseum; 5,369	33–36
70	March 13	Los Angeles	85–104	Fred Foster (20)	Jim Brewer (14)	Bingo Smith (4)	Richfield Coliseum; 4,735	34–36
71	March 15	Philadelphia	96–88	Bingo Smith (23)	Jim Brewer (11)	Chones, Foster, Smith (4)	Richfield Coliseum; 13,897	34–37
72	March 16	@ New Orleans	113–111	Jim Brewer (24)	Jim Brewer (15)	Chones, Cleamons (4)	Loyola Field House; 3,824	35–37
73	March 18	Washington	98–112	Smith, Snyder (23)	Bingo Smith (11)	Jim Cleamons (8)	Richfield Coliseum; 6,823	36–37
74	March 20	Chicago	83–87	Jim Chones (22)	Jim Chones (12)	Jim Cleamons (7)	Richfield Coliseum; 7,491	37–37
75	March 22	@ Washington	97–100	Jim Chones (18)	Jim Chones (10)	Cleamons, Snyder, Walker (4)	Capital Centre; 8,471	37–38
76	March 23	Houston	95–101	Jim Brewer (18)	Jim Chones (12)	Jim Chones (7)	Richfield Coliseum; 14,769	38–38
77	March 25	Boston	89–84	Jim Chones (18)	Jim Chones (13)	Cleamons, Walker (4)	Richfield Coliseum; 18,911	38–39
78	March 27	@ Chicago	86–83	Jim Chones (16)	Brewer, Snyder (7)	Jim Cleamons (4)	Chicago Stadium; 10,031	39–39
79	March 28	@ Houston	105–112	Jim Chones (22)	Jim Chones (7)	Cleamons, Walker (4)	Hofheinz Pavilion; 10,518	39–40
80	March 29	@ Atlanta	97–103	Jim Brewer (19)	Brewer, Cleamons (9)	Jim Cleamons (7)	Omni Coliseum; 4,542	39–41

April: 1–1 (home: 1–0; road: 0–1)

Game	Date	Team	Score	High points	High rebounds	High assists	Location Attendance	Record
81	April 3	New York	95–100	Dick Snyder (22)	Jim Brewer (13)	Bingo Smith (8)	Richfield Coliseum; 20,239	40–41
82	April 6	@ Kansas City–Omaha	94–95	Jim Chones (23)	Jim Brewer (21)	Bingo Smith (4)	Omaha Civic Auditorium; 8,895	40–42

Source: www.basketball-reference.com
