= Bill Fitch =

American basketball coach (1932–2022)

- Fitch with Larry Bird (left) in 1979

Personal information
- Born: May 19, 1932 Davenport, Iowa, U.S.
- Died: February 2, 2022 (aged 89) Lake Conroe, Texas, U.S.
- Listed height: 6 ft 2 in (1.88 m)
- Listed weight: 205 lb (93 kg)

Career information
- High school: Wilson (Cedar Rapids, Iowa)
- College: Coe (1950–1954)
- Coaching career: 1956–1998

Career highlights
- As head coach: NBA champion (1981); 2× NBA Coach of the Year Award (1976, 1980); NBA All-Star Game head coach (1982); Top 10 Coaches in NBA History; Chuck Daly Lifetime Achievement Award (2013)

Career coaching record
- NBA: 944–1106 (.460)
- Record at Basketball Reference
- Basketball Hall of Fame

William Charles Fitch (May 19, 1932 – February 2, 2022) was an American professional basketball coach in the National Basketball Association (NBA). He developed multiple teams into playoff contenders and won an NBA championship with the Boston Celtics in 1981. Before entering the professional ranks, he coached college basketball at the University of Minnesota, Bowling Green State University, the University of North Dakota, and his alma mater, Coe College. Fitch's teams twice qualified for the NCAA tournament. He won the Chuck Daly Lifetime Achievement Award in 2013, and was elected to the Naismith Memorial Basketball Hall of Fame in 2019.

== Early life ==
William Charles Fitch was born on May 19, 1932, in Davenport, Iowa. He attended Wilson in Cedar Rapids, Iowa, where he excelled in basketball.

== College career ==
Fitch attended Coe College from 1950 to 1954.

== Coaching career ==
=== Creighton (1956–1958) ===
Fitch was an assistant coach at Creighton from 1956 to 1958.

=== Coe (1958–1962) ===
Fitch coached Coe from 1958 to 1962.

=== North Dakota (1962–1967) ===
Fitch led North Dakota to three NCAA Division II men's basketball tournaments, including a Final Four appearance in 1966.

=== Bowling Green (1967–1968) ===
At Fitch's only season with Bowling Green, the Falcons reached the 1968 NCAA University Division basketball tournament after winning the Mid-American Conference title with an 18–7 record and 10–2 in conference play.

=== Minnesota (1968–1970) ===
In Fitch's two seasons at Minnesota, Fitch coached the Golden Gophers to 12–12 and 13–11.

=== Cleveland Cavaliers (1970–1979) ===
Fitch was the first head coach hired by the expansion Cleveland Cavaliers on March 19, 1970, for their inaugural 1970–71 season. In that season, the Cavaliers went 15–67. The Cavaliers did not have a season as bad as that one until the 1981–82 season, which also garnered 15 wins. The team gradually rose in wins for the next two years, winning 32 in his third season, although they slipped slightly the following year. In his first four years, they finished last each time in the Central Division.

His fifth season (1974–75) resulted in marked improvement as the Cavs won 40 games while finishing third, their first season without a last-place finish. By this point, the team had a clear leader in its #1 draft pick from 1971, Austin Carr. He had become the leading scorer for the team, but a serious knee injury curtailed Cleveland's hopes for a playoff berth.

The following season of 1975–76 was the pinnacle of his career with Cleveland. The team, now fabled as "The Miracle of Richfield", was led by team captain Carr, scoring small forward Campy Russell, shooting guard Bobby "Bingo" Smith, and a supporting cast of largely unknown players such as starting center Jim Chones, and an aging Nate Thurmond. The team won 49 games (a team record for 13 seasons) and the Central Division title. They defeated the Washington Bullets in seven games to advance to the Conference Finals, where they were defeated in six games by the Boston Celtics, with Chones being sidelined by a broken foot in practice two days before the conference finals. The Cavaliers did not win another playoff series until 1992. Fitch was awarded the NBA Coach of the Year Award at the end of the season.

Fitch led the team to two more playoff berths, although they did not win either series. After a 30–52 record for the 1978–79 season, he resigned on May 21, 1979.

=== Boston Celtics (1979–1983) ===
On May 23, 1979, Fitch was hired by the Boston Celtics, taking over for Dave Cowens, who had coached them to a 29–53 record as a player-coach the previous season. His first season in 1979–80 was also the first for Larry Bird. A former drill instructor in the U. S. Marine Corps, the coach was lauded by Bird for his intense practices and discipline. Fitch helped lead the Celtics to 61 wins along with an Atlantic Division title. In the playoffs that year, the Celtics were defeated in the Conference Finals to the Philadelphia 76ers in five games. Fitch won his second Coach of the Year Award after the season.

In his second season, the Celtics drafted Kevin McHale and acquired Robert Parish, both through a trade with the Golden State Warriors. Fitch's team won 62 games along with a second Atlantic title. They went on to beat the Houston Rockets in six games to win the 1981 NBA Finals, Boston's first title since 1976.

Fitch led the Celtics to a third consecutive Atlantic Division title in 1981–82 while winning 63 games, although the team lost in the Conference Finals to the 76ers in seven games. The 1982–83 team dropped in wins (from 63 to 56) while finishing second in the Atlantic Division, and were defeated by the Milwaukee Bucks in four games. On May 27, 1983, he resigned from the Celtics. Fitch cited Harry T. Mangurian Jr.'s announcement that he was selling the team due to difficulties with Delaware North (the owners of the Boston Garden) as the last straw, despite Fitch having three years left on his contract.

=== Houston Rockets (1983–1988) ===
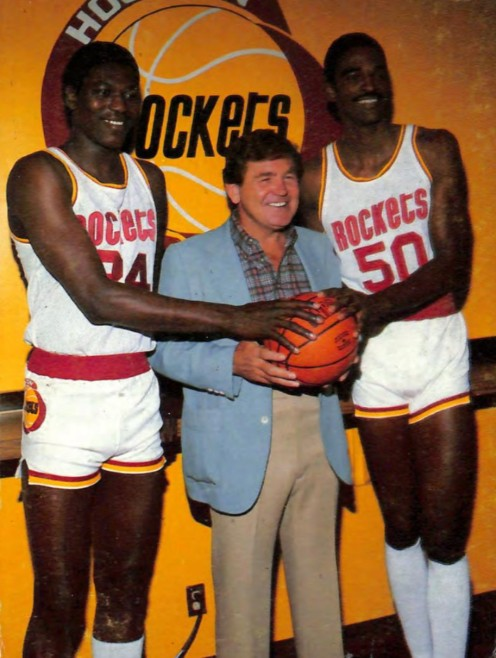
Fitch between Hakeem Olajuwon (left) and Ralph Sampson (right) in 1984

On June 1, 1983, Fitch was hired by the Houston Rockets, taking over for Del Harris, who had managed the team to 14 wins the previous season. The 1983–84 Houston Rockets season also happened to be the first season with Ralph Sampson on the team. The team won 29 games that season. The next season was the season in which the Rockets drafted Hakeem Olajuwon, and the team responded with 48 wins and a playoff berth, although they were beaten in five games by the Utah Jazz. His third season was his best season with the team as they won the Midwest Division title along with the Western Conference title after beating the Los Angeles Lakers in five games. They met Fitch's old team, the Celtics. Boston beat the team in six games to win the Finals. Fitch's following two seasons led to playoff berths, although they did not advance past the Conference Semi-finals. Fitch was fired on June 6, 1988.

=== New Jersey Nets (1989–1992) ===
On August 21, 1989, Fitch was hired by the New Jersey Nets, replacing Willis Reed, who had gone 26–56 the previous season. The team acquired Sam Bowie on draft day in order to try and start a rebuilding process, although the team went 17–65 for the season, the fewest wins for the Nets since joining the NBA. Fitch gradually raised the team up, acquiring Derrick Coleman, Dražen Petrović, and Terry Mills helping the team qualify for a playoff berth in the 1991–92 New Jersey Nets season. The team went to the playoffs with a losing record of 40–42, sixth-best in the 14 team Eastern Conference. They lost in the First Round to Fitch's old team, the Cavaliers in four games. On May 12, 1992, he resigned as coach of the team.

=== Los Angeles Clippers (1994–1998) ===
On July 28, 1994, Fitch was hired by the Los Angeles Clippers, replacing Bob Weiss, who had gone 27–55 the previous year. In four seasons with the team, he could not reverse the tide of a franchise that had gone on a downward spiral since making the playoffs in consecutive seasons in 1992 and 1993. However, he led them to a playoff berth once, doing so in the 1996–97 season (the last playoff berth for the team until 2006), although they were swept in the First Round by the Jazz. They made the playoffs despite going 36–46, qualifying by just two games. The following season was a disaster, with the team finishing 17–65, the worst season since finishing with that same record in the 1994–95 season. Two days after the season ended, Fitch was fired on April 20, 1998. Fitch's most losses record in NBA history with 1,106 losses a record stood for five years until Lenny Wilkens broke his mark during the 2002–03 season while coaching for the Toronto Raptors. Wilkens' NBA coaching career finished with 1,155 losses after he announced his retirement from coaching on January 22, 2005.

Fitch coached at four universities: the University of Minnesota, Bowling Green State University, the University of North Dakota, and his alma mater, Coe College.

During his 25-year pro coaching career, Fitch was often hired in an attempt to improve failing teams. Although Fitch currently ranks tenth among NBA coaches in all-time number of victories (with 944), he is also ranked second in all-time losses (with 1,106) behind Lenny Wilkens. In 1996, Fitch was named one of the Top 10 Coaches in NBA History. In 2016, Fitch was honored with an honorary bench by the Hall of Fame, which surrounds a statue of James Naismith along with other granite benches in honor of great coaches, all made possible through a $150,000 donation by Rick Carlisle.

Christopher Gerhman portrayed him in Winning Time.

== Personal life and death ==
Fitch was born in Davenport, Iowa, on May 19, 1932. He attended Coe College, where he played basketball and baseball and graduated in 1954 with a degree in physical education.

Fitch died in Lake Conroe, Texas, on February 2, 2022, at the age of 89.

== Head coaching record ==
=== NBA ===
Legend
Regular season	G	Games coached	W	Games won	L	Games lost	W–L %	Win–loss %
Playoffs	PG	Playoff games	PW	Playoff wins	PL	Playoff losses	PW–L %	Playoff win–loss %

Team	Year	G	W	L	W–L%	Finish	PG	PW	PL	PW–L%	Result
Cleveland	1970–71	82	15	67	.183	4th in Central	—	—	—	—	Missed Playoffs
Cleveland	1971–72	82	23	59	.280	4th in Central	—	—	—	—	Missed Playoffs
Cleveland	1972–73	82	32	50	.390	4th in Central	—	—	—	—	Missed Playoffs
Cleveland	1973–74	82	29	53	.354	4th in Central	—	—	—	—	Missed Playoffs
Cleveland	1974–75	82	40	42	.488	3rd in Central	—	—	—	—	Missed Playoffs
Cleveland	1975–76	82	49	33	.598	1st in Central	13	6	7	.462	Lost in Conf. Finals
Cleveland	1976–77	82	43	39	.524	4th in Central	3	1	2	.333	Lost in First round
Cleveland	1977–78	82	43	39	.524	3rd in Central	2	0	2	.000	Lost in First round
Cleveland	1978–79	82	30	52	.366	4th in Central	—	—	—	—	Missed Playoffs
Boston	1979–80	82	61	21	.744	1st in Atlantic	9	5	4	.556	Lost in Conf. Finals
Boston	1980–81	82	62	20	.756	1st in Atlantic	17	12	5	.706	Won NBA Championship
Boston	1981–82	82	63	19	.768	1st in Atlantic	12	7	5	.583	Lost in Conf. Finals
Boston	1982–83	82	56	26	.683	2nd in Atlantic	7	2	5	.286	Lost in Conf. Semi-finals
Houston	1983–84	82	29	53	.354	6th in Midwest	—	—	—	—	Missed Playoffs
Houston	1984–85	82	48	34	.585	2nd in Midwest	5	2	3	.400	Lost in First round
Houston	1985–86	82	51	31	.622	1st in Midwest	20	13	7	.650	Lost in NBA Finals
Houston	1986–87	82	42	40	.512	3rd in Midwest	10	5	5	.500	Lost in Conf. Semi-finals
Houston	1987–88	82	46	36	.561	4th in Midwest	4	1	3	.250	Lost in First round
New Jersey	1989–90	82	17	65	.207	6th in Atlantic	—	—	—	—	Missed Playoffs
New Jersey	1990–91	82	26	56	.317	5th in Atlantic	—	—	—	—	Missed Playoffs
New Jersey	1991–92	82	40	42	.488	3rd in Atlantic	4	1	3	.250	Lost in First round
L.A. Clippers	1994–95	82	17	65	.207	7th in Pacific	—	—	—	—	Missed Playoffs
L.A. Clippers	1995–96	82	29	53	.354	7th in Pacific	—	—	—	—	Missed Playoffs
L.A. Clippers	1996–97	82	36	46	.439	5th in Pacific	3	0	3	.000	Lost in First round
L.A. Clippers	1997–98	82	17	65	.207	7th in Pacific	—	—	—	—	Missed Playoffs
Career		2,050	944	1,106	.460		109	55	54	.505	
