= Dick Snyder =

American basketball player

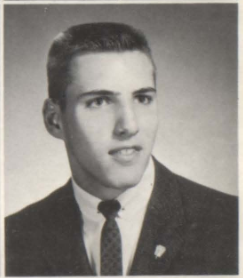
- Snyder's senior portrait c. 1961–1962

Personal information
- Born: February 1, 1944 (age 82) North Canton, Ohio, U.S.
- Listed height: 6 ft 5 in (1.96 m)
- Listed weight: 207 lb (94 kg)

Career information
- High school: Hoover (North Canton, Ohio)
- College: Davidson (1963–1966)
- NBA draft: 1966: 2nd round, 14th overall pick
- Drafted by: St. Louis Hawks
- Playing career: 1966–1979
- Position: Small forward / shooting guard
- Number: 10, 11

Career history
- 1966–1968: St. Louis Hawks
- 1968–1969: Phoenix Suns
- 1969–1974: Seattle SuperSonics
- 1974–1978: Cleveland Cavaliers
- 1978–1979: Seattle SuperSonics

Career highlights
- NBA champion (1979); Consensus second-team All-American (1966); SoCon Player of the Year (1966); 2× First-team All-SoCon (1965, 1966); Second-team All-SoCon (1964)

Career statistics
- Points: 11,755 (12.2 ppg)
- Rebounds: 2,732 (2.8 rpg)
- Assists: 2,767 (2.9 apg)
- Stats at NBA.com
- Stats at Basketball Reference

Richard J. Snyder Jr. (born February 1, 1944) is an American former professional basketball player. He played in the National Basketball Association (NBA) for the St. Louis Hawks, Phoenix Suns, Seattle SuperSonics, and Cleveland Cavaliers. Snyder graduated from Davidson College and was drafted by the Hawks in the second round of the 1966 NBA draft. A solid shooting guard who also played small forward on occasion, Snyder achieved his greatest basketball successes with the SuperSonics franchise.

During the early 1970s, Snyder was often among the league leaders in field goal percentage. Perhaps his best season statistically was the 1970–71 season when he averaged 19.4 points per game and was fifth in the league in both field goal and free throw percentage. Traded to Cleveland after the 1974 season, Snyder returned to the SuperSonics in his final season in 1978–79 where he earned an NBA championship ring.

Snyder was a star football, baseball, and basketball player in high school and also pitched and played outfield for Davidson's baseball team. In 2011, he was inducted into the Ohio Basketball Hall of Fame.

== Career statistics ==
Legend
GP	Games played	GS	Games started	MPG	Minutes per game
FG%	Field goal percentage	3P%	3-point field goal percentage	FT%	Free throw percentage
RPG	Rebounds per game	APG	Assists per game	SPG	Steals per game
BPG	Blocks per game	PPG	Points per game	**Bold**	Career high
*	Led the league

=== NBA ===
==== Regular season ====
Year	Team	GP	GS	MPG	FG%	FT%	RPG	APG	STL	BLK	PPG
1966–67	St. Louis	55		12.3	.432	.754	1.7	1.1			6.1
1967–68	St. Louis	75		21.6	.419	.772	2.6	2.2			8.6
1968–69	Phoenix	81		26.0	.472	.725	4.0	2.6			12.1
1969–70	Phoenix	**6***		24.5	.489	**.875**	2.5	1.5			8.5
1969–70	Seattle	**76***		30.1	**.531**	.810	**4.1**	**4.4**			13.6
1970–71	Seattle	**82**		34.4	**.531**	.837	3.1	4.3			**19.4**
1971–72	Seattle	73		34.7	.529	.842	3.1	3.9			16.6
1972–73	Seattle	**82***		**37.3**	.463	.861	3.9	3.8			13.8
1973–74	Seattle	74		36.1	.481	.866	**4.1**	3.6	**1.2**	.4	18.1
1974–75	Cleveland	**82**		31.6	.504	.846	2.9	3.4	.8	**.5**	14.2
1975–76	Cleveland	**82**	**82**	27.7	.501	.824	2.4	2.7	.7	.4	12.6
1976–77	Cleveland	**82**		20.5	.456	.852	1.8	2.0	.5	.4	9.3
1977–78	Cleveland	58		11.4	.444	**.875**	.8	1.0	.4	.3	4.8
1978–79†	Seattle	56		9.6	.433	.843	.9	1.1	.3	.1	3.7
Career		964	82	26.6	.488	.824	2.8	2.9	.7	.4	12.2

==== Playoffs ====
Year	Team	GP	MPG	FG%	FT%	RPG	APG	STL	BLK	PPG
1967	St. Louis	1	2.0	–	–	.0	.0			.0
1968	St. Louis	4	15.5	**.455**	.800	1.3	1.0			6.0
1976	Cleveland	**13**	**28.0**	.451	**.818**	**2.2**	**2.4**	**.8**	.5	**12.0**
1977	Cleveland	3	17.7	.296	.400	1.7	1.3	.3	**.7**	6.0
1978	Cleveland	1	3.0	–	–	.0	.0	.0	.0	.0
1979†	Seattle	9	9.8	.323	.667	1.2	1.1	.4	.3	2.9
Career		31	18.5	.416	.732	1.6	1.6	.6	.4	7.2
