= Foots Walker =

American basketball player (born 1951)

Personal information
- Born: May 21, 1951 (age 75) Southampton, New York, U.S.
- Listed height: 6 ft 0 in (1.83 m)
- Listed weight: 172 lb (78 kg)

Career information
- High school: Southampton (Southampton, New York)
- College: Vincennes (1970–1972); West Georgia (1972–1974)
- NBA draft: 1974: 3rd round, 38th overall pick
- Drafted by: Cleveland Cavaliers
- Playing career: 1974–1984
- Position: Point guard
- Number: 14, 10, 1

Career history
- 1974–1980: Cleveland Cavaliers
- 1980–1983: New Jersey Nets

Career highlights
- NAIA tournament MVP (1974)

Career NBA statistics
- Points: 4,199 (6.4 ppg)
- Rebounds: 1,686 (2.6 rpg)
- Assists: 3,111 (4.7 apg)
- Stats at NBA.com
- Stats at Basketball Reference

Clarence "Foots" Walker (born May 21, 1951, in Southampton, New York) is a former professional basketball player.

A 6' 0" guard, he led the Vincennes Trailblazers to their second NJCAA National Title (1970) alongside Bob McAdoo; after transferring to the West Georgia College, he led Roger Kaiser's Braves to the 1974 NAIA National Title. Walker spent ten seasons (1974–1984) in the NBA, playing for the Cleveland Cavaliers and the New Jersey Nets. On October 17, 1978, Walker set a career high with 26 points scored in a win against the Los Angeles Lakers. He was the first Cavalier to record a triple-double, which he achieved in 1979.

In 1980, Walker was partying with former-teammate Terry Furlow shortly before Furlow died after crashing into a utility pole while under the influence of cocaine and valium.

Walker was inducted into the Suffolk Sports Hall of Fame in the Basketball Category with the Class of 1991, and currently resides in Kansas City, Missouri.

== Career statistics ==
Legend
GP	Games played	GS	Games started	MPG	Minutes per game
FG%	Field goal percentage	3P%	3-point field goal percentage	FT%	Free throw percentage
RPG	Rebounds per game	APG	Assists per game	SPG	Steals per game
BPG	Blocks per game	PPG	Points per game	**Bold**	Career high

=== NBA ===
==== Regular season ====
Year	Team	GP	GS	MPG	FG%	3P%	FT%	RPG	APG	SPG	BPG	PPG
1974–75	Cleveland	72		14.9	.404		.684	2.0	2.7	1.1	.1	4.2
1975–76	Cleveland	**81**		15.8	.388		.778	2.2	3.6	1.2	.1	4.6
1976–77	Cleveland	62		19.6	.450		.774	2.6	4.1	1.3	.1	6.5
1977–78	Cleveland	**81**		30.8	.448		.719	3.6	5.6	2.2	**.3**	9.0
1978–79	Cleveland	55		**31.9**	**.464**		.783	3.6	5.8	**2.4**	**.3**	**10.1**
1979–80	Cleveland	76		**31.9**	.454	.111	.802	**3.8**	**8.0**	2.0	.2	9.4
1980–81	New Jersey	41		28.6	.426	.222	.793	2.5	6.2	1.3	.0	5.7
1981–82	New Jersey	77	**54**	24.2	.413	.333	.727	1.9	5.2	1.6	.1	5.9
1982–83	New Jersey	79	10	17.6	.456	.167	.779	1.7	3.3	1.0	.0	4.4
1983–84	New Jersey	34	0	11.1	.356	**.400**	**.889**	.9	2.4	.6	.1	2.6
Career		658	64	22.9	.435	.227	.762	2.6	4.7	1.5	.1	6.4

==== Playoffs ====
Year	Team	GP	MPG	FG%	3P%	FT%	RPG	APG	SPG	BPG	PPG
1976	Cleveland	**13**	9.6	.407		.800	1.2	1.8	.5	.1	2.3
1977	Cleveland	3	31.7	**.486**		.733	**4.0**	**6.7**	1.3	.3	**15.7**
1978	Cleveland	2	**35.0**	.385		**1.000**	3.5	5.0	**1.5**	**1.0**	12.5
1983	New Jersey	2	18.0	.333	–	**1.000**	.0	5.5	.0	.0	3.5
1984	New Jersey	2	2.0	.000	–	–	.0	.0	.0	.0	.0
Career		22	15.0	.423	–	.818	1.6	2.9	.6	.2	5.0
