= Steve Patterson (basketball) =

American basketball player-coach (1948–2004)

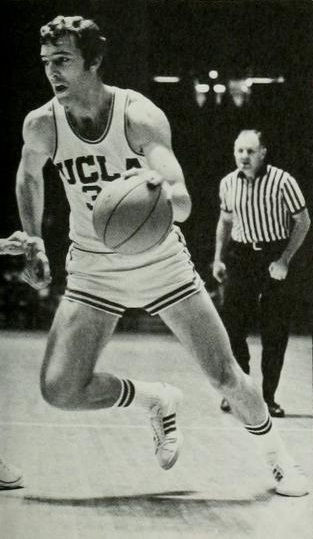
- Patterson from 1971 UCLA yearbook

Personal information
- Born: June 24, 1948 Riverside, California, U.S.
- Died: July 28, 2004 (aged 56) Phoenix, Arizona, U.S.
- Listed height: 6 ft 9 in (2.06 m)
- Listed weight: 225 lb (102 kg)

Career information
- High school: Santa Maria (Santa Maria, California)
- College: UCLA (1968–1971)
- NBA draft: 1971: 2nd round, 18th overall pick
- Drafted by: Cleveland Cavaliers
- Playing career: 1971–1977
- Position: Center
- Number: 50, 42, 32
- Coaching career: 1983–1989

Career history

Playing
- 1971–1975: Cleveland Cavaliers
- 1975–1976: Chicago Bulls
- 1976–1977: Sporting Gira Ozzano

Coaching
- 1983–1984: Santa Rosa JC
- 1984–1985: Arizona State (assistant)
- 1985–1989: Arizona State

Career highlights
- 3× NCAA champion (1969–1971)

Career NBA playing statistics
- Points: 1,552 (4.4 ppg)
- Rebounds: 1,632 (4.7 rpg)
- Assists: 443 (1.3 apg)
- Stats at NBA.com
- Stats at Basketball Reference

Career coaching record
- NCAA: 48–56 (.462)

Steven John Patterson (June 24, 1948 – July 28, 2004) was an American professional basketball player and coach who played in the National Basketball Association (NBA) for five seasons. A 6'9" center for UCLA, Patterson spent his first year of athletic eligibility (1968-69, the third of the Bruins' unprecedented string of seven consecutive national titles) as the backup to Lew Alcindor, later Kareem Abdul-Jabbar. He then was the starting center for the Bruins' 1970 and 1971 championship teams under legendary coach John Wooden.

== Early life ==
Patterson played basketball at Santa Maria High School in Santa Maria, California. In is senior season, he averaged 34 points per game and was named All–American and was California Interscholastic Federation (CIF) Southern Section Player of the Year as he led his team to the CIF championship.

== College career ==
Patterson was UCLA's starting center in the seasons between Alcindor and Bill Walton, and part of the Bruins' string of seven consecutive NCAA titles.

Patterson averaged 21.9 points and 20.2 rebounds per game on the Bruins' freshman team in 1966–67, then redshirted in 1967–68.

He served as a backup on the 1968–69 team. He was eighth on the team in scoring with 5.0 points per game and fifth in rebounding with 3.8 per game. He also scored four points in the 1969 NCAA Championship victory over Purdue.

In 1969–70 he was joined in the starting lineup by four other future NBA players, forwards Sidney Wicks and Curtis Rowe and guards Henry Bibby and John Vallely. For the season he averaged 12.5 points and 10.0 rebounds per game, with a field goal percentage of .496 and free throw percentage of .741. He scored 17 points as UCLA defeated Jacksonville University 80–69 in the 1970 NCAA championship game. After the season, UCLA honored him with the J.D. Morgan Memorial Award presented by the Bruin Hoopsters for the outstanding "team player."

In 1971, he helped lead the Bruins to another national title with the same starting lineup, except for Kenny Booker replacing the graduated Vallely, as Patterson averaged 12.9 points and 9.8 rebounds per game. Patterson saved his best for the final game of his college career with a personal–best 29 points in a 68–62 win over Villanova in the 1971 NCAA championship game.

During Patterson's two seasons as a starter, the UCLA Bruins were a combined 57–3, and had a total record of 84–4 in his three varsity seasons.

At UCLA, Patterson was an active member of Campus Crusade for Christ. Patterson also started a ministry on campus, the Jesus Christ Light and Power House, which housed and served Christians and students of all faiths and persuasions.

== Professional career ==
Patterson was eligible for the professional basketball drafts after his second varsity season due to his earlier redshirt season. He passed up a chance to play for the Phoenix Suns, who selected him in the 1970 NBA draft, and the Texas Chaparrals of the American Basketball Association, who chose him in the 1970 ABA Draft. Patterson re-entered the 1971 NBA draft and was the first selection of the second round by the expansion Cleveland Cavaliers, and he signed with the Cavaliers.

Patterson showed ability as an inside defender and rebounder, but also battled knee problems and never reached his potential as an NBA player. He played five years in Cleveland, mostly as a backup.

However, he had his most productive year as primarily a starter in his third season, 1973–74, when he played over 25 minutes per game and averaged 7.8 points, 8.1 rebounds and 2.2 assists, all career highs. That season he also set a personal-best of 22 points in a game, on February 16, 1974, in a win against the Portland Trail Blazers. It was one of three 20-plus games that season for Patterson. In the following season, he topped his career single-game point production with 23 on January 19, 1975, in a loss to the Detroit Pistons.

During the 1975–76 season—his fifth and final NBA season—after playing 14 games for the Cavaliers, on November 27, 1975, he was traded along with Eric Fernsten to the Chicago Bulls for Nate Thurmond and Rowland Garrett. He played in 52 games for the Bulls, and the following year was released prior to the season's start. After the NBA, he played one year professionally in Italy.

== Post-playing career ==
Patterson then went into coaching, becoming the men's head basketball coach at Santa Rosa Junior College from 1983 to 1985. He then became head coach at Arizona State from 1985 through 1989, coaching the Sun Devils to a 48–56 record. He was also the chairman of Phoenix's organizing committee for Super Bowl XXX (1996) and commissioner of the Continental Basketball Association in 1997.

== Personal life ==
Patterson spent the last years of his life organizing youth and community sports programs in Arizona, including as founder of the Grand Canyon State Games. He and his wife, Carlette, ran Patterson Sports Ventures, which specialized in marketing for professional athletes, sports philanthropy and sports ministries. He was a gourmet cook, a history buff and a wine connoisseur.

Patterson died of lung cancer at home on July 28, 2004, at age 56. He was survived by his wife of seven years, Carlette, their daughter, Makena, her daughters Amanda and Sara, and Steve's sons from his first marriage John and Brent. A lifelong Christian, Patterson made faith the core of his post-NBA activities and he is remembered at TheGoal.com. The Goal had been his central organization to church-sports activities.

== Honors ==
In 2005, the Robert Wood Johnson Foundation established the Steve Patterson Award for Excellence in Sports Philanthropy, because he believed in and practiced the use of the power of sports philanthropy to make a difference.

== Career statistics ==
Legend
GP	Games played	GS	Games started	MPG	Minutes per game
FG%	Field goal percentage	3P%	3-point field goal percentage	FT%	Free throw percentage
RPG	Rebounds per game	APG	Assists per game	SPG	Steals per game
BPG	Blocks per game	PPG	Points per game	**Bold**	Career high

=== NBA ===
==== Regular season ====
Year	Team	GP	GS	MPG	FG%	FT%	RPG	APG	SPG	BPG	PPG
1971–72	Cleveland	65		11.9	.357	.500	3.5	.8			3.2
1972–73	Cleveland	62		11.5	.359	.523	3.7	.8			2.8
1973–74	Cleveland	76		**25.1**	**.437**	.616	**8.1**	**2.2**	**.6**	**.8**	**7.8**
1974–75	Cleveland	**81**		15.7	.416	.658	4.1	1.1	.3	.2	4.6
1975–76	Cleveland	14		9.7	.395	**.800**	2.0	.6	.2	.4	2.7
1975–76	Chicago	52	1	15.0	.379	.591	3.8	1.4	.3	.2	3.2
Career		350	1	15.9	.403	.594	4.7	1.3	.4	.4	4.4
