= Austin Carr =

American basketball player (born 1948)

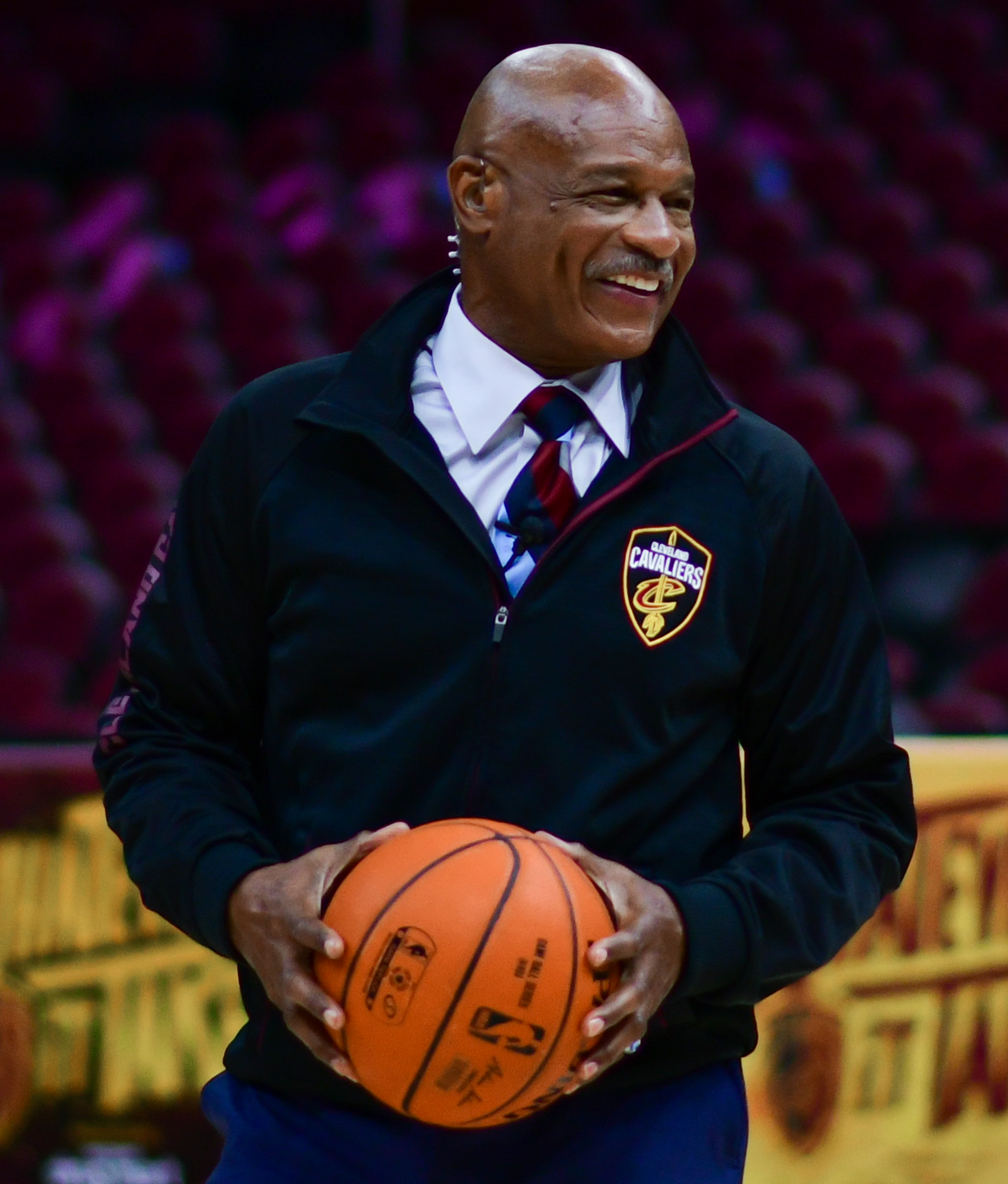
- Carr in 2018

Personal information
- Born: March 10, 1948 (age 78) Washington, D.C., U.S.
- Listed height: 6 ft 4 in (1.93 m)
- Listed weight: 200 lb (91 kg)

Career information
- High school: Mackin (Washington, D.C.)
- College: Notre Dame (1968–1971)
- NBA draft: 1971: 1st round, 1st overall pick
- Drafted by: Cleveland Cavaliers
- Playing career: 1971–1981
- Position: Shooting guard
- Number: 22, 34

Career history
- 1971–1980: Cleveland Cavaliers
- 1980: Dallas Mavericks
- 1980–1981: Washington Bullets

Career highlights
- NBA All-Star (1974); NBA All-Rookie First Team (1972); No. 34 retired by Cleveland Cavaliers; Naismith College Player of the Year (1971); AP Player of the Year (1971); Helms Foundation Player of the Year (1971); UPI Player of the Year (1971); Consensus first-team All-American (1971); Consensus second-team All-American (1970); Fourth-team Parade All-American (1967)

Career statistics
- Points: 10,473 (15.4 ppg)
- Rebounds: 1,990 (2.9 rpg)
- Assists: 1,878 (2.8 apg)
- Stats at NBA.com
- Stats at Basketball Reference
- Collegiate Basketball Hall of Fame

Austin George Carr (born March 10, 1948) is an American former professional basketball player and commentator who played for the Cleveland Cavaliers, Dallas Mavericks, and Washington Bullets of the National Basketball Association (NBA). In college, he won several national awards while playing for the Notre Dame Fighting Irish. He is known by Cleveland basketball fans as "Mr. Cavalier".

== Early career ==
Carr grew up in Washington, D.C., and attended Holy Redeemer School, and later Mackin Catholic High School. At Mackin, Carr teamed with All-City guard Tom Little, who made some national All-American teams before starring at the University of Seattle. As a Junior All Met, Carr scored 475 points in 24 games. During Carr's All Met senior season, he scored 600 points and along with Sterling Savoy, led the Paul Furlong coached Trojans to the Catholic League title over DeMatha. Carr was named Parade All-American along with other 1967 seniors such as Artis Gilmore, Howard Porter, Jim McDaniels, and Curtis Rowe, all of whom became major college stars.

== College career ==
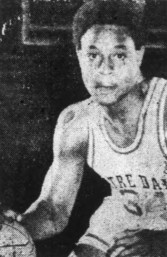
Carr with Notre Dame, circa 1969

The 6-foot 4-inch (1.93 m), 200 lb (91 kg) shooting guard first came to prominence as a highly recruited player for the University of Notre Dame, arriving after having scored more than 2,000 points during his high school career. Carr lived up to his lofty billing by ending his three-year career at Notre Dame with 2,560 points (an average of 34.5 points per game), ranking him fifth all-time in college basketball history at the time of his departure. During his final two seasons, Carr became only the second college player ever to tally more than 1,000 points in a season, joining Pete Maravich in that select group. Carr holds NCAA tournament records for most points in one game (61 vs. Ohio in 1970), most field goals in one game (25), and most field goals attempted in one game (44). He has three of the top five scoring performances in NCAA tournament history. His record scoring average of 50 points per game in seven NCAA playoff games has yet to be broken.

He was part of the Notre Dame team which defeated the UCLA Bruins on January 19, 1971, which was UCLA's last defeat until being beaten by Notre Dame exactly three years later, breaking the Bruins' NCAA men's basketball record 88-game winning streak.

Carr has been featured in several "all-time best" lists for his successful college career at Notre Dame. In 2008, ESPN named Carr the 22nd greatest college basketball player of all time. In 2010, Bleacher Report listed Carr as the 21st greatest college basketball player of all time. Carr was featured in another Bleacher Report article in 2013, this time being named the 12th most dominant college basketball player in history. In March 2020, Carr was featured on ESPN's "SportsCenter Special: College Basketball's Greatest of All Time" 64-player bracket, which celebrated the best men's and women's college basketball players ever. A March Madness styled bracket that was voted on by fans, Carr was listed as a 16 seed, with his career accomplishments at Notre Dame being pit against those of Breanna Stewart from UConn. In November 2020, ClutchPoints published their list of the 25 greatest college players of all time, with Carr listed as the 20th best player of all time.

== NBA career ==
=== NBA draft ===
Carr moved onto the professional ranks as the first overall selection of the Cleveland Cavaliers in the 1971 NBA draft. Carr was also selected in the 1971 ABA Draft by the Virginia Squires, but signed with the Cavaliers on April 5, 1971.

=== Rookie season and early NBA career ===
Carr's first season in the NBA was marred by a series of injuries that limited his output. During the 1971 preseason, he broke his foot and missed the first month of the season. Less than one month after returning to the court, he was sidelined again by another foot injury, missing another seven weeks. Upon his return, he began to display the skills which made him the top selection in the NBA draft and was named to the 1972 NBA All-Rookie Team. Following the conclusion of his first season, Carr had surgery to clear up any lingering foot problems.

The arrival of Lenny Wilkens prior to the start of the 1972–73 campaign gave Carr a solid partner in the backcourt, helping the Cavaliers improve by nine games in the win column. Carr's best statistical season came the following year, when he averaged a career-best in points (21.9), assists (3.8), free-throw percentage (85.6%), and minutes per game (38.3), while also averaging 3.6 rebounds and appearing in 81 games. Carr's performance on the court resulted in him being selected to the 1974 Eastern Conference All-Star team, his only All-Star Game appearance.

Two months into the 1974–75 season, Carr suffered a knee injury that put him out of the lineup indefinitely. His absence in the lineup likely prevented the Cavaliers' from capturing their first-ever playoff berth, as they finished with a 40–42 record and fell just one game short of qualifying for the 1975 playoffs.

=== "Miracle of Richfield" and other playoff years (1975–1978) ===
The following season during the 1975–76 campaign, Carr helped lead the Cavaliers to their first winning season, Central Division title and playoff appearance in franchise history. This marked the first of three straight playoff appearances for the team, with Carr playing a key role in the team's success throughout this period. In the 1976 Eastern Conference Semifinals, their first playoff series in franchise history, the Cavaliers defeated the Washington Bullets 4–3 in a close, back-and-forth seven-game series. Cleveland won Game 7 by a score of 87–85, after Cavaliers guard Dick Snyder hit a go-ahead shot with 4 seconds left in the game. The Cavaliers advanced to the Eastern Conference Finals for the first time in franchise history, where they would lose to the eventual NBA champion Boston Celtics in six games. Although the Cavaliers didn't advance past the second round of the playoffs, the 1975–76 team became revered throughout Northeast Ohio and is hailed as one of the most notorious teams in Cleveland sports history. The Cavs run to the playoffs and series win over the Washington Bullets became known locally as "The Miracle of Richfield." Carr averaged 11.8 points in 13 games during the 1976 playoffs.

After appearing in just 41 and 65 games the previous two years, Carr played in all 82 games in the 1976–77 season for the first time since his second NBA season. He averaged 16.2 points per game, an increase of 6.1 points from the previous season. Carr's strong play helped lead the Cavaliers back to the playoffs, where they were eliminated in the first round by the Washington Bullets in a close three-game series. Carr once again played in all 82 games in the 1977–78 season, helping the Cavaliers reach the playoffs for a third consecutive year. They faced off against the New York Knicks in the 1978 playoffs, losing in two games. Carr averaged playoff career-bests in points (17.5), rebounds (4.0), steals (1.0) and minutes per game (34.5).

=== Later career ===
Carr played two more seasons with the Cavaliers. He had a strong 1978–79 campaign, averaging 17 points per game and shooting a career best 47.5% from the field in 82 games. However, the Cavaliers would finish with a 30–52 record and fail to reach the playoffs for the first time since 1975. The Cavaliers also failed to reach the playoffs the following year in 1980, Carr's final season with the team. Throughout his 9-year tenure with Cleveland, Carr averaged 16.2 points, 3 rebounds and 2.9 assists per game. In 1979-1980 his final season as a player for the Cavaliers he won the J. Walter Kennedy Citizenship Award and is known as a pilar in the community.

The 1980–81 season would be Carr's last as an NBA player. He played with the Dallas Mavericks and Washington Bullets, appearing in 47 total games. He retired in 1981, finishing with career averages of 15.4 points, 2.9 rebounds and 2.8 assists per game.

== NBA career statistics ==
Legend
GP	Games played	GS	Games started	MPG	Minutes per game
FG%	Field goal percentage	3P%	3-point field goal percentage	FT%	Free throw percentage
RPG	Rebounds per game	APG	Assists per game	SPG	Steals per game
BPG	Blocks per game	PPG	Points per game	**Bold**	Career high

=== Regular season ===
Year	Team	GP	GS	MPG	FG%	3P%	FT%	RPG	APG	SPG	BPG	PPG
1971–72	Cleveland	43	—	35.8	.426	—	.760	3.5	3.4	—	—	21.2
1972–73	Cleveland	**82**	—	37.8	.446	—	.822	**4.5**	3.4	—	—	20.5
1973–74	Cleveland	81	—	**38.3**	.445	—	**.856**	3.6	**3.8**	1.1	**.2**	**21.9**
1974–75	Cleveland	41	—	26.4	.468	—	.840	2.6	**3.8**	**1.2**	.0	14.5
1975–76	Cleveland	65	—	19.7	.442	—	.791	2.0	1.9	.6	.0	10.1
1976–77	Cleveland	**82**	—	29.4	.457	—	.795	2.9	2.7	.7	.1	16.2
1977–78	Cleveland	**82**	—	26.7	.438	—	.813	2.3	2.7	.8	**.2**	12.3
1978–79	Cleveland	**82**	—	33.1	**.475**	—	.816	3.5	2.6	.9	**.2**	17.0
1979–80	Cleveland	77	—	20.7	.465	**.333**	.738	2.1	1.9	.5	.0	11.8
1980–81	Dallas	8	—	9.6	.250	—	.500	1.1	1.1	.1	.0	2.0
1980–81	Washington	39	—	14.9	.388	.000	.640	1.3	1.3	.4	.1	4.9
Career		682	—	28.8	.449	.154	.804	2.9	2.8	.8	.1	15.4
All-Star		1	0	5.0	.000	—	—	1.0	.0	.0	.0	.0

=== Playoffs ===
Year	Team	GP	GS	MPG	FG%	3P%	FT%	RPG	APG	SPG	BPG	PPG
1976	Cleveland	**13**	—	21.0	**.478**	—	.611	1.8	2.0	.5	.2	11.8
1977	Cleveland	3	—	27.7	.282	—	.333	3.3	**3.3**	.7	.3	7.7
1978	Cleveland	2	—	**34.5**	.370	—	**.938**	**4.0**	2.5	**1.0**	**.5**	**17.5**
Career		18	—	23.6	.426	—	.691	2.3	2.3	.6	.3	11.8

== Post-playing career ==
=== Broadcasting career and other milestones ===
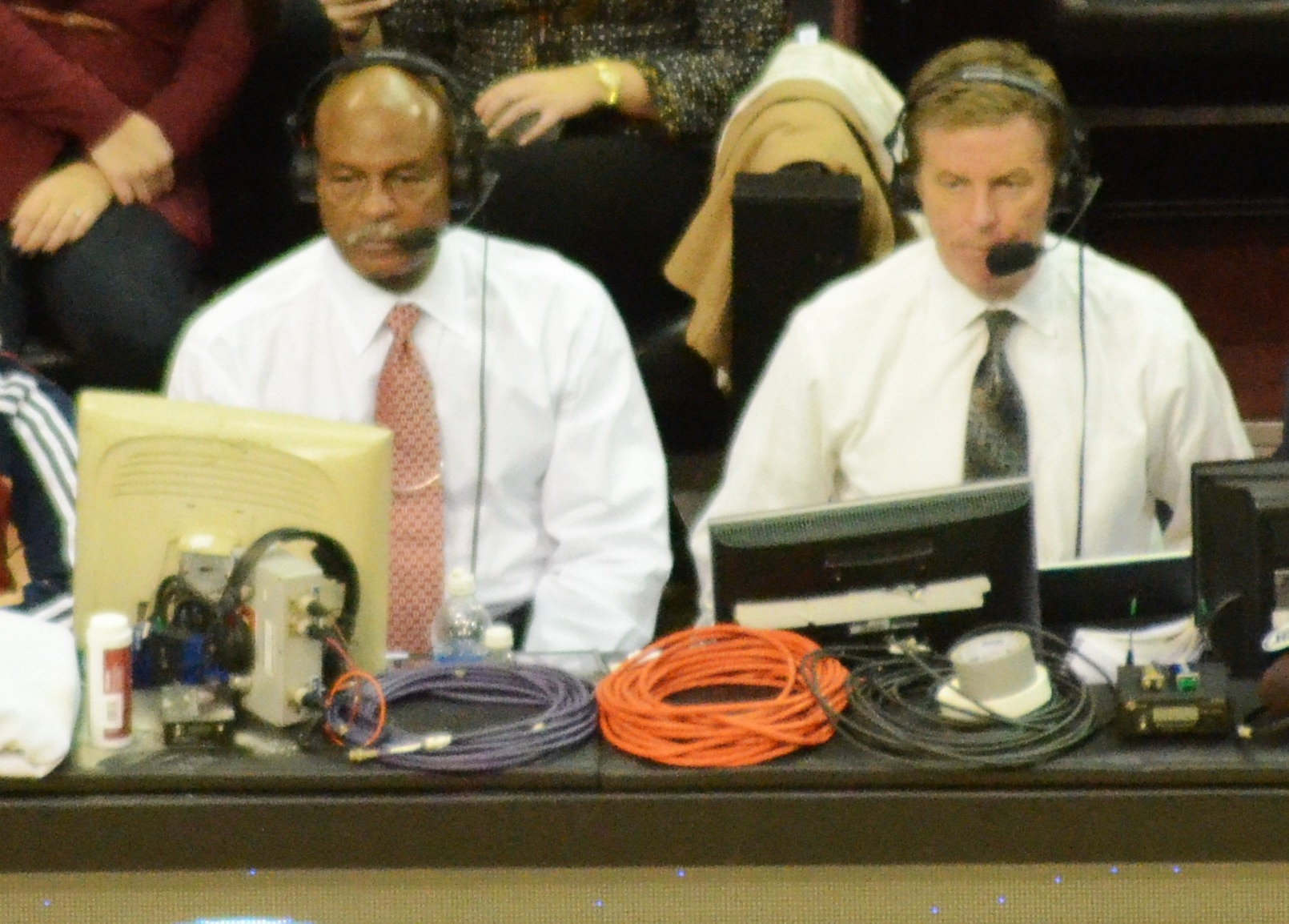
Carr (left) and Fred McLeod calling a Cleveland Cavaliers game in 2012

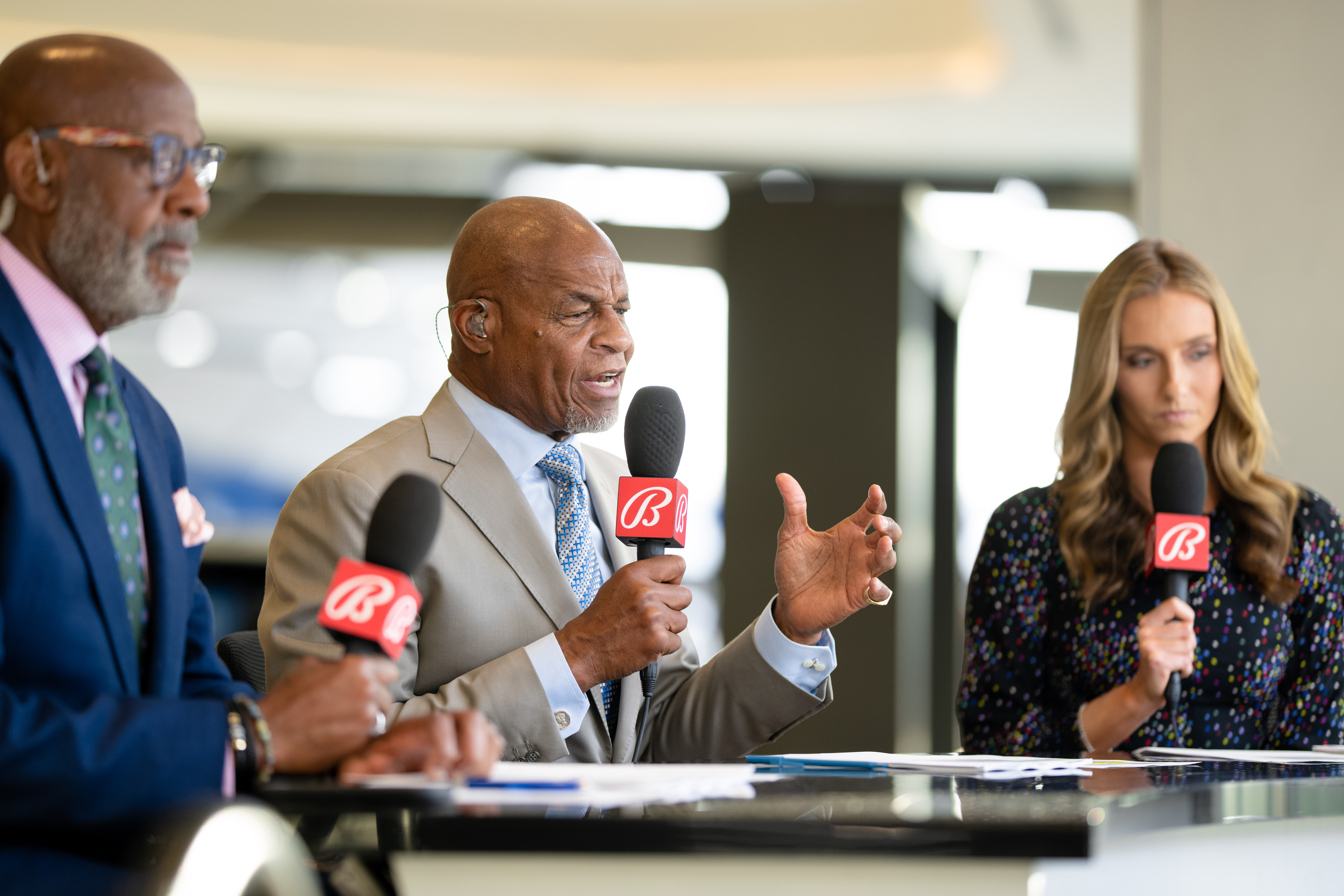
Carr in 2023

Today, Carr serves as the Director of Community Relations for the Cavaliers and is also a color commentator on the team's broadcasts on Fanduel Sport’s Network. Carr's #34 is one of seven jerseys retired by the Cavaliers.

It was announced on April 2, 2007, that Carr was inducted to the second class of the College Basketball Hall of Fame, along with Dick Groat, Dick Barnett and numerous coaches.

On February 21, 2008, Notre Dame recognized Carr, their all-time leading scorer, during the Pittsburgh – Notre Dame men's basketball game.

==== Signature calls ====
- He throws the hammer down! – for a Cavs slam dunk
- He hits it deep in the Rock (or name of the arena for road games)! – for a Cavs three-pointer
- Get that weak stuff outta here! – for a Cavs blocked shot
- He got him a bird – When a Cavs player gets an opponent to bite on a pump-fake
- Mouse in the house – When a Cavs player is being guarded by a much smaller defender
- There's a breeze in the building – When an opponent air balls a shot
- He dots the i – When a Cavs player hits a mid-range jumper
- Too much pressure bursts the pipe – When the Cavs defense is wreaking havoc on the opposition
- Right back in your face – When the Cavs score after the other team
- Pressure will crack the Liberty Bell – When the Cavs are playing lockdown defense against the Philadelphia 76ers

== Awards and honors ==
=== College ===
- 1971 Naismith College Player of the Year
- 1971 Associated Press College Basketball Player of the Year
- 1971 First Team All-American
- College Basketball Hall of Fame Inductee (class of 2007)
- Notre Dame Basketball Ring of Honor (class of 2011)

=== Professional ===
- 1972 NBA All-Rookie First Team
- 1974 NBA All-Star Game Selection
- J. Walter Kennedy Citizenship Award: (1980)
- Cleveland Sports Hall of Fame Inductee (class of 1992)
- 2011 Greater Cleveland Sports Commission Lifetime Achievement Award
- Number retired by the Cleveland Cavaliers (#34)
- Cavaliers Wall of Honor

=== Broadcasting ===
- Five-time Lower Great Lakes Emmy Award recipient as a member of the FanDuel Sports Network Ohio Cavaliers broadcast team - 2014, 2017, 2018, 2022, 2024

== See also ==
- List of NCAA Division I men's basketball players with 60 or more points in a game
