= Ron Behagen =

American basketball player

Personal information
- Born: January 14, 1951 (age 75) New York City, New York, U.S.
- Listed height: 6 ft 9 in (2.06 m)
- Listed weight: 185 lb (84 kg)

Career information
- High school: DeWitt Clinton (The Bronx, New York)
- College: College of Southern Idaho (1969–1971); Minnesota (1971–1973)
- NBA draft: 1973: 1st round, 7th overall pick
- Drafted by: Kansas City–Omaha Kings
- Playing career: 1973–1980
- Position: Power forward / center
- Number: 11, 34, 1, 27, 14, 12

Career history
- 1973–1975: Kansas City–Omaha Kings
- 1975–1977: New Orleans Jazz
- 1977: Atlanta Hawks
- 1977: Houston Rockets
- 1977–1978: Indiana Pacers
- 1978: Detroit Pistons
- 1979: New York Knicks
- 1979: Kansas City Kings
- 1979–1980: Antonini Siena
- 1980: Washington Bullets

Career highlights
- NBA All-Rookie First Team (1974); Third-team All-American – UPI (1973); First-team All-Big Ten (1973)

Career NBA statistics
- Points: 3,977 (10.3 ppg)
- Rebounds: 2,712 (7.0 rpg)
- Assists: 624 (1.6 apg)
- Stats at NBA.com
- Stats at Basketball Reference

Ronald Michael Behagen (born January 14, 1951) is an American former professional basketball player.

A 6'9" center from DeWitt Clinton High School in New York City, Behagen played basketball in junior college and at the University of Minnesota during the early 1970s. One of his teammates was future Baseball Hall-of-Famer Dave Winfield. After his college career ended in 1973, Behagen was drafted by the Kentucky Colonels in the 1973 American Basketball Association draft and by the Kansas City Kings in the first round of the 1973 NBA draft.

Behagen played seven seasons in the NBA as a member of the Kansas City Kings, New Orleans Jazz, Atlanta Hawks, Houston Rockets, Indiana Pacers, Detroit Pistons, New York Knicks, and Washington Bullets and in Italy for Antonini Siena. He received NBA All-Rookie Team honors in 1974. In his NBA career, he averaged 10.3 points and 7.0 rebounds per game.

== Brawl with Ohio State ==
On January 25, 1972, Behagen was involved in one of the most serious on-court incidents in college basketball history when he and several teammates attacked Ohio State University's Luke Witte. According to the Big Ten Conference's review of the game film, Witte appeared to elbow Minnesota guard Bobby Nix as the two teams headed to their locker rooms at halftime. As the game progressed, Ohio State established a 50–44 lead with less than a minute to play when Minnesota's Clyde Turner flagrantly fouled Witte during a layup attempt, knocking Witte to the floor. Corky Taylor of Minnesota helped Witte up, then kneed Witte in the groin. A melee between the two teams ensued, and Behagen came off the bench to stomp Witte in the head, leaving him unconscious. Ohio State coach Fred Taylor described it as "the sorriest thing [he] ever saw in intercollegiate athletics." Behagen and Corky Taylor were suspended for the rest of that season, though Witte did not press charges against either.

== Later years ==
On January 3, 2012, Behagen was sentenced to three years probation and ordered to pay restitution after pleading guilty to stealing money from a 68-year-old Atlanta woman suffering from Alzheimer's disease, Parkinson's disease, and dementia. According to the Fulton County District Attorney's Office, Behagen received the woman's ATM card from her caretaker, Valla Rider. Behagen withdrew $7,140 from the woman's bank account in 40 transactions between April 2011 and June 2011; all of the transactions were recorded on bank cameras. Rider had pleaded guilty to financial transaction card fraud in August 2011.

== NBA career statistics ==
Legend
GP	Games played	GS	Games started	MPG	Minutes per game
FG%	Field goal percentage	3P%	3-point field goal percentage	FT%	Free throw percentage
RPG	Rebounds per game	APG	Assists per game	SPG	Steals per game
BPG	Blocks per game	PPG	Points per game	**Bold**	Career high

=== Regular season ===
Year	Team	GP	GS	MPG	FG%	3P%	FT%	RPG	APG	SPG	BPG	PPG
1973–74	Kansas City–Omaha	80	-	25.7	.432	-	.764	7.1	1.7	0.7	0.5	11.0
1974–75	Kansas City–Omaha	**81**	-	**27.2**	.399	-	.754	7.3	1.9	0.7	0.5	10.7
1975–76	New Orleans	66	-	26.3	.446	-	.804	**8.4**	**2.1**	1.0	0.4	**11.5**
1976–77	New Orleans	60	-	19.5	.418	-	.714	7.2	1.4	0.7	0.3	8.6
1977–78	Atlanta	26	-	22.0	.470	-	.729	6.7	1.3	**1.2**	0.5	11.0
1977–78	Houston	3	-	11.0	**.636**	-	.000	2.3	0.7	0.0	0.0	4.7
1977–78	Indiana	51	-	22.2	.408	-	.727	6.5	1.3	0.6	0.4	11.2
1978–79	Detroit	1	-	1.0	.000	-	.000	0.0	0.0	0.0	0.0	0.0
1978–79	New York	5	-	7.6	.417	-	**1.000**	2.2	0.4	0.4	0.0	2.4
1978–79	Kansas City	9	-	14.0	.460	-	.727	3.4	0.6	0.2	0.1	6.0
1979–80	Washington	6	-	10.7	.391	.000	.833	2.3	1.2	0.0	**0.7**	3.8
Career		388	-	23.5	.425	.000	.754	7.0	1.6	0.7	0.4	10.3

=== Playoffs ===
Year	Team	GP	GS	MPG	FG%	3P%	FT%	RPG	APG	SPG	BPG	PPG
1974–75	Kansas City–Omaha	**6**	-	**18.0**	**.512**	-	**1.000**	**4.8**	1.0	**0.2**	**0.3**	**7.8**
1979–80	Washington	2	-	7.0	.286	.000	.000	1.0	**1.5**	0.0	0.0	2.0
Career		8	-	15.3	.480	.000	1.000	3.9	1.1	0.1	0.3	6.4
