= John Lambert (basketball) =

American former professional basketball player

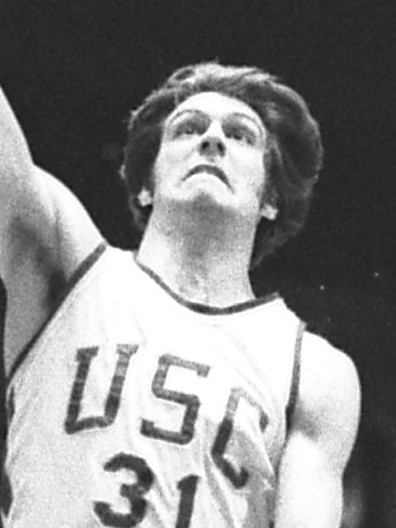
- Lambert in 1975

Personal information
- Born: January 14, 1953 (age 73) Berkeley, California, U.S.
- Listed height: 6 ft 10 in (2.08 m)
- Listed weight: 225 lb (102 kg)

Career information
- High school: Berkeley (Berkeley, California)
- College: USC (1972–1975)
- NBA draft: 1975: 1st round, 15th overall pick
- Drafted by: Cleveland Cavaliers
- Playing career: 1975–1983
- Position: Center / power forward
- Number: 24

Career history
- 1975–1980: Cleveland Cavaliers
- 1980–1982: Kansas City Kings
- 1982: San Antonio Spurs
- 1982–1983: Reyer Venezia

Career NBA statistics
- Points: 1,688 (3.8 ppg)
- Rebounds: 1,493 (3.3 rpg)
- Assists: 248 (0.6 apg)
- Stats at NBA.com
- Stats at Basketball Reference

John Edward Lambert (born January 14, 1953) is an American former professional basketball player born in Berkeley, California. In high school at Berkeley, he played basketball and was a member of The State Champs Berkeley High Yellowjackets, which included Glenn Burke, a professional baseball player. In 2007 he was inducted into the school's new Athletic Hall of Fame.

A 6'10" center at the University of Southern California, Lambert played varsity basketball at USC for three years. He graduated with honors with a BA in Journalism and Public Relations.

== Professional career ==
Lambert played in the National Basketball Association from 1975 to 1982.

In the 1975 NBA draft, he was selected by the Cleveland Cavaliers as their first pick, and number 15 overall. He signed a multi-year contract in July 1975, and again in September 1979. In November 1980, Cleveland activated Lambert from the injured reserve list; he had been on the list since the beginning of the season, because of back spasms.

In December 1980, Cleveland placed Lambert on waivers; he became a free agent and was signed that month by the Kansas City Kings. In February 1982, Kansas City sent Lambert to the San Antonio Spurs for a third round draft selection in 1984, plus cash. In August 1982 he again was placed on waivers and became a free agent.

In his NBA career, Lambert averaged 3.8 points per game and 3.3 rebounds per game, playing in a total of 446 games.

== Post-NBA career ==
In 1986, Lambert began his career in the financial services industry. From 2001 to 2009, he was a Principal with KCM Investment Advisors, where he focused on its high net worth and institutional business. He left in 2009 to join Neuberger Berman; in September 2010 he was promoted to the position of West Coast regional director for that company's wealth management business.

Lambert left Neuberger Berman in 2014 and joined Morgan Stanley as the producing branch manager of their San Francisco, California office. He later moved his high net worth practice to Morgan Stanley's Santa Rosa, California office; he retired in February 2021.

== Career statistics ==
Legend
GP	Games played	GS	Games started	MPG	Minutes per game
FG%	Field goal percentage	3P%	3-point field goal percentage	FT%	Free throw percentage
RPG	Rebounds per game	APG	Assists per game	SPG	Steals per game
BPG	Blocks per game	PPG	Points per game	**Bold**	Career high

=== NBA ===
==== Regular season ====
Year	Team	GP	GS	MPG	FG%	3P%	FT%	RPG	APG	SPG	BPG	PPG
1975–76	Cleveland	54		6.2	.445		.676	1.9	.3	.1	.2	2.3
1976–77	Cleveland	63		8.8	.427		.694	2.4	.5	.3	.3	2.5
1977–78	Cleveland	**76**		14.1	.423		.563	4.3	.5	.4	**.7**	4.1
1978–79	Cleveland	70		14.7	.450		.636	4.1	.6	.4	.4	4.7
1979–80	Cleveland	74		**17.9**	.413	.000	.723	**4.8**	.8	**.6**	.6	**5.4**
1980–81	Cleveland	3		2.7	**.600**	–	–	1.0	**1.0**	.0	.0	2.0
1980–81	Kansas City	43		11.0	.406	.000	.783	2.1	.6	.3	.1	3.4
1981–82	Kansas City	42	1	11.7	.432	**.167**	.750	3.0	.6	.3	.2	3.4
1981–82	San Antonio	21	**6**	12.9	.448	.000	**.929**	2.4	.6	.3	.3	3.1
Career		446	7	12.5	.428	.083	.693	3.3	.6	.3	.4	3.8

==== Playoffs ====
Year	Team	GP	MPG	FG%	3P%	FT%	RPG	APG	SPG	BPG	PPG
1976	Cleveland	6	5.7	.385		**1.000**	1.8	.2	.2	**.3**	2.0
1977	Cleveland	3	6.3	**.500**		–	1.0	.0	**.7**	.0	1.3
1978	Cleveland	2	9.5	.333		.500	**4.0**	.0	.0	.0	1.5
1981	Kansas City	**15**	**11.7**	.407	.000	.833	2.5	**.6**	.3	**.3**	**3.3**
1982	San Antonio	2	1.5	.000	.000	–	.5	.5	.0	.0	.0
Career		28	8.9	.400	.000	.800	2.1	.4	.3	.2	2.4
