= Bingo Smith =

American basketball player (1946–2023)

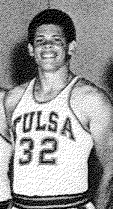
- Smith in 1969

Personal information
- Born: February 26, 1946 Memphis, Tennessee, U.S.
- Died: October 26, 2023 (aged 77) Akron, Ohio, U.S.
- Listed height: 6 ft 5 in (1.96 m)
- Listed weight: 195 lb (88 kg)

Career information
- High school: Melrose (Memphis, Tennessee)
- College: Tulsa (1966–1969)
- NBA draft: 1969: 1st round, 6th overall pick
- Drafted by: San Diego Rockets
- Playing career: 1969–1980
- Position: Small forward / shooting guard
- Number: 32, 7

Career history
- 1969–1970: San Diego Rockets
- 1970–1979: Cleveland Cavaliers
- 1979–1980: San Diego Clippers

Career highlights
- No. 7 retired by Cleveland Cavaliers; Third-team All-American – AP (1969); MVC Player of the Year (1969); First-team All-MVC (1969); No. 32 retired by Tulsa Golden Hurricane

Career NBA statistics
- Points: 10,882 (12.6 ppg)
- Rebounds: 3,630 (4.2 rpg)
- Assists: 1,734 (2.0 apg)
- Stats at NBA.com
- Stats at Basketball Reference

Robert "Bingo" Smith (February 26, 1946 – October 26, 2023) was an American professional basketball player. He played for the San Diego Rockets, the Cleveland Cavaliers, and the San Diego Clippers.

== College career ==
Smith played for the Tulsa Golden Hurricane. It was there where he got his nickname of Bingo when Len Morton, the announcer, would yell "Bingo" each time he scored.

== Playing career ==
With the sixth pick in the first round of the 1969 NBA draft, the San Diego Rockets selected Smith. A year later, he was drafted by the Cleveland Cavaliers in the 1970 Expansion Draft. In his first game with the team, he scored 21 points. He helped contribute to the Cavaliers winning the NBA Central Division title in 1976, and was part of the Miracle at Richfield, winning Game 2 of the Semifinals vs the Washington Bullets.

In 11 seasons, Smith played in 865 games and logged 22,407 minutes. Smith was especially noted for his ability to hit jump shots from long range. His outside jump shots often were taken from today's 3 point range. For his career, he recorded a .449 field goal percentage (4,776 FGs made out of 10,642 attempts). Smith also had a .798 free throw rate (1,307-of-1,637) and also accounted for 3,630 total rebounds, 1,734 assists and 10,882 points. Smith was known for his rainbow jumper, now utilized by other forwards such as Dirk Nowitzki.

His best season was in 1974, when he scored 15.9 points per game and had a .483 field goal percentage.

Smith played the full 82 games in four of his seasons, but he also led the league in turnover percentage in his final three seasons. He scored his 10,000th point in the middle of the 1979 season.

On October 27, 1979, he was traded for a 3rd round draft pick (used to pick Stuart House) to the San Diego Clippers. Oddly enough, the Cavaliers retired his number over a month later, while he was still playing with the Clippers. Fittingly, he ended his career in the same place it had started. After one season (the first year that the three point line was instituted), he was drafted by the Dallas Mavericks in 1980 Expansion Draft, but he never played for them, retiring at the age of 34.

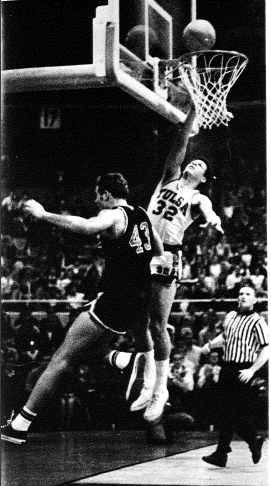
Smith in 1969

Smith was inducted into the University of Tulsa Athletics Hall of Fame in 1984. His number 7 has been retired by the Cleveland Cavaliers.

Smith is fourth all time in games played with the Cavaliers, fifth in minutes played, sixth in points, third in field goals and field goal attempts, and third in turnover percentage.

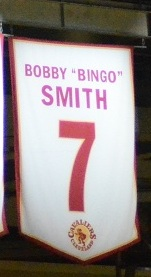
Smith's Jersey Hanging At Rocket Mortgage Field House

Smith was a member of the 2016 class of the Ohio Basketball Hall of Fame. In 2020, Tulsa retired Smith's number 32. He died on October 26, 2023.

== Personal life and death ==
On April 1, 2009, Smith suffered a stroke. He was divorced, had five children, five grandchildren and two great-grandchildren.

Smith died on October 26, 2023, at the age of 77.

== NBA career statistics ==
Legend
GP	Games played	GS	Games started	MPG	Minutes per game
FG%	Field goal percentage	3P%	3-point field goal percentage	FT%	Free throw percentage
RPG	Rebounds per game	APG	Assists per game	SPG	Steals per game
BPG	Blocks per game	PPG	Points per game	**Bold**	Career high

=== Regular season ===
Year	Team	GP	GS	MPG	FG%	3P%	FT%	RPG	APG	SPG	BPG	PPG
1969–70	San Diego	75	—	16.0	.427	—	.688	4.4	1.0			7.3
1970–71	Cleveland	77	—	30.3	.448	—	.761	5.6	**3.4**			15.2
1971–72	Cleveland	**82**	—	**33.3**	.443	—	.795	**6.1**	3.0			15.0
1972–73	Cleveland	73	—	14.6	.444	—	.790	2.7	1.5			8.2
1973–74	Cleveland	**82**	—	31.9	.443	—	.822	5.3	2.4	**1.1**	**.4**	14.8
1974–75	Cleveland	**82**	—	32.1	**.483**	—	.825	5.0	2.8	1.0	.3	**15.9**
1975–76	Cleveland	81	—	28.9	.442	—	.816	4.2	1.9	.7	**.4**	13.6
1976–77	Cleveland	81	—	26.4	.446	—	.818	3.9	1.9	.8	**.4**	14.5
1977–78	Cleveland	**82**	—	19.3	.439	—	.800	2.5	1.1	.5	.3	10.3
1978–79	Cleveland	72	—	22.9	.460	—	.783	2.9	1.7	.6	.1	11.2
1979–80	Cleveland	8	—	16.9	.458	.200	**.875**	1.8	.9	.4	.3	9.3
1979–80	San Diego	70	—	28.4	.430	**.289**	.869	3.5	1.3	.8	.2	11.7
Career		865	—	25.9	.449	.284	.798	4.2	2.0	.8	.3	12.6

=== Playoffs ===
Year	Team	GP	GS	MPG	FG%	3P%	FT%	RPG	APG	SPG	BPG	PPG
1976	Cleveland	**13**	—	**29.2**	.433	—	.880	**3.3**	**2.3**	.8	.2	**12.6**
1977	Cleveland	3	—	19.0	.231	—	**1.000**	2.7	1.3	**1.0**	**.3**	7.0
1978	Cleveland	2	—	17.0	**.615**	—	—	1.5	.5	.5	.0	8.0
Career		18	—	26.1	.407	—	.893	3.0	1.9	.8	.2	11.2
