= 50 Greatest Players in NBA History =

The 50 Greatest Players in NBA History, also referred to as NBA's 50th Anniversary All-Time Team, were chosen in 1996 to honor the 50th anniversary of the founding of the National Basketball Association (NBA). It was the third anniversary team in the league. Fifty players were selected through a vote by a panel of media members, former players and coaches, and current and former general managers. In addition, the top ten head coaches and top ten single-season teams in NBA history were selected by media members as part of the celebration. The 50 players had to have played at least a portion of their careers in the NBA and were selected irrespective of position played.

The list was announced by NBA commissioner David Stern on October 29, 1996, at the hotel Grand Hyatt New York, the site of the Commodore Hotel, where the original NBA charter was signed in 1946. The announcement marked the beginning of a season-long celebration of the league's anniversary. Forty-seven of the fifty players were later assembled in Cleveland, during the halftime ceremony of the 1997 All-Star Game. (Note: Three players were absent: Pete Maravich, who had died in 1988; Shaquille O'Neal, who was recovering from a knee injury; and Jerry West, who was scheduled to have surgery and could not fly.) At the time of the announcement, 11 players were active; all have subsequently retired.

== Players selected ==
=== List ===
Eleven players (Charles Barkley, Clyde Drexler, Patrick Ewing, Michael Jordan, Karl Malone, Shaquille O'Neal, Hakeem Olajuwon, Robert Parish, Scottie Pippen, David Robinson, and John Stockton) were active in the 1996–97 season, during which the list was announced. All have since retired. O'Neal was the last to be active in the NBA, retiring at the end of the 2010–11 season. All of the selected players have been inducted into the Naismith Memorial Basketball Hall of Fame. At the time of the list, only Pete Maravich was deceased.

All 11 members from the 35th anniversary team were selected. Eight of the 10 players from the 25th anniversary team were chosen, with Bob Davies and Joe Fulks—who both last played in the 1950s—being omitted.

Key
Italics		Denotes player who was active in the NBA at the time of induction			
All Star		Denotes number of All-Star appearances			
HOF Year		Denotes year of Basketball Hall of Fame induction			
G	Guard	F	Forward	C	Center
Pos	Position	Pts	Points	Reb	Rebounds
Ast		Assists	MVP	Most Valuable Player	

(†) - Player deceased when selected for the team

Name	Team(s) played for (years)^{[a]}	Pos	Pts	Reb	Ast	Championships won^{[b]}	MVP won	Finals MVP won	All Star	HOF Year	Ref.
Kareem Abdul-Jabbar	Milwaukee Bucks (1969–1975); Los Angeles Lakers (1975–1989)	C	38,387	17,440	5,660	6 (1971, 1980, 1982, 1985, 1987, 1988)	6 (1971, 1972, 1974, 1976, 1977, 1980)	2 (1971, 1985)	19	1995	
Nate Archibald	Cincinnati Royals / Kansas City-Omaha / Kansas City Kings (1970–1976); New York Nets (1976–1977); Boston Celtics (1978–1983); Milwaukee Bucks (1983–1984)	G	16,481	2,046	6,476	1 (1981)	None	None	6	1991	
Paul Arizin	Philadelphia Warriors (1950–1952, 1954–1962)	F	16,266	6,129	1,665	1 (1956)	None	None	10	1978	
Charles Barkley	Philadelphia 76ers (1984–1992); Phoenix Suns (1992–1996); Houston Rockets (1996–2000)	F	23,757	12,546	4,215	None	1 (1993)	None	11	2006	
Rick Barry	San Francisco / Golden State Warriors (1965–1967, 1972–1978); Houston Rockets (1978–1980)	F	18,395	5,168	4,017	1 (1975)	None	1 (1975)	8	1987	
Elgin Baylor	Minneapolis / Los Angeles Lakers (1958–1971)	F	23,149	11,463	3,650	None	None	None	11	1977	
Dave Bing	Detroit Pistons (1966–1975); Washington Bullets (1975–1977); Boston Celtics (1977–1978)	G	18,327	3,420	5,397	None	None	None	7	1990	
Larry Bird	Boston Celtics (1979–1992)	F	21,791	8,974	5,695	3 (1981, 1984, 1986)	3 (1984, 1985, 1986)	2 (1984, 1986)	12	1998	
Wilt Chamberlain	Philadelphia / San Francisco Warriors (1959–1965); Philadelphia 76ers (1965–1968); Los Angeles Lakers (1968–1973)	C	31,419	23,924	4,643	2 (1967, 1972)	4 (1960, 1966, 1967, 1968)	1 (1972)	13	1979	
Bob Cousy	Boston Celtics (1950–1963); Cincinnati Royals (1969–1970)	G	16,960	4,786	6,955	6 (1957, 1959, 1960, 1961, 1962, 1963)	1 (1957)	None	13	1971	
Dave Cowens	Boston Celtics (1970–1980); Milwaukee Bucks (1982–1983)	C	13,516	10,444	2,910	2 (1974, 1976)	1 (1973)	None	7	1991	
Billy Cunningham	Philadelphia 76ers (1965–1972, 1974–1976)	F	13,626	6,638	2,625	1 (1967)	None	None	4	1986	
Dave DeBusschere	Detroit Pistons (1962–1968); New York Knicks (1968–1974)	F	14,053	9,618	2,497	2 (1970, 1973)	None	None	8	1983	
Clyde Drexler	Portland Trail Blazers (1983–1995); Houston Rockets (1995–1998)	G	22,195	6,677	6,125	1 (1995)	None	None	10	2004	
Julius Erving	Philadelphia 76ers (1976–1987)	F	18,364	5,601	3,224	1 (1983)	1 (1981)	None	11	1993	
Patrick Ewing	New York Knicks (1985–2000); Seattle SuperSonics (2000–2001); Orlando Magic (2001–2002)	C	24,815	11,607	2,215	None	None	None	11	2008	
Walt Frazier	New York Knicks (1967–1977); Cleveland Cavaliers (1977–1979)	G	15,581	4,830	5,040	2 (1970, 1973)	None	None	7	1987	
George Gervin	San Antonio Spurs (1976–1985); Chicago Bulls (1985–1986)	G	20,708	3,607	2,214	None	None	None	9	1996	
Hal Greer	Syracuse Nationals / Philadelphia 76ers (1958–1973)	G	21,586	5,665	4,540	1 (1967)	None	None	10	1982	
John Havlicek	Boston Celtics (1962–1978)	F/G	26,395	8,007	6,114	8 (1963, 1964, 1965, 1966, 1968, 1969, 1974, 1976)	None	1 (1974)	13	1984	
Elvin Hayes	San Diego / Houston Rockets (1968–1972, 1981–1984); Baltimore / Capital / Washington Bullets (1972–1981)	F/C	27,313	16,279	2,398	1 (1978)	None	None	12	1990	
Magic Johnson	Los Angeles Lakers (1979–1991, 1996)	G	17,707	6,559	10,141	5 (1980, 1982, 1985, 1987, 1988)	3 (1987, 1989, 1990)	3 (1980, 1982, 1987)	12	2002	
Sam Jones	Boston Celtics (1957–1969)	G	15,411	4,305	2,209	10 (1959, 1960, 1961, 1962, 1963, 1964, 1965, 1966, 1968, 1969)	None	None	5	1984	
Michael Jordan	Chicago Bulls (1984–1993, 1995–1998); Washington Wizards (2001–2003)	G	32,292	6,672	5,633	6 (1991, 1992, 1993, 1996, 1997, 1998)	5 (1988, 1991, 1992, 1996, 1998)	6 (1991, 1992, 1993, 1996, 1997, 1998)	14	2009	
Jerry Lucas	Cincinnati Royals (1963–1969); San Francisco Warriors (1969–1971); New York Knicks (1971–1974)	F	14,053	12,942	2,732	1 (1973)	None	None	7	1980	
Karl Malone	Utah Jazz (1985–2003); Los Angeles Lakers (2003–2004)	F	36,928	14,968	5,248	None	2 (1997, 1999)	None	14	2010	
Moses Malone	Buffalo Braves (1976); Houston Rockets (1976–1982); Philadelphia 76ers (1982–1986, 1993–1994); Washington Bullets (1986–1988); Atlanta Hawks (1988–1991); Milwaukee Bucks (1991–1993); San Antonio Spurs (1994–1995)	C	27,409	16,212	1,796	1 (1983)	3 (1979, 1982, 1983)	1 (1983)	12	2001	
Pete Maravich †	Atlanta Hawks (1970–1974); New Orleans / Utah Jazz (1974–1980); Boston Celtics (1980)	G	15,948	2,747	3,563	None	None	None	5	1987	
Kevin McHale	Boston Celtics (1980–1993)	F	17,335	7,122	1,670	3 (1981, 1984, 1986)	None	None	7	1999	
George Mikan	Minneapolis Lakers (1948–1954, 1956)	C	10,156	4,167	1,245	5 (1949, 1950, 1952, 1953, 1954)	None	None	4	1959	
Earl Monroe	Baltimore Bullets (1967–1971); New York Knicks (1971–1980)	G	17,454	2,796	3,594	1 (1973)	None	None	4	1990	
Hakeem Olajuwon	Houston Rockets (1984–2001); Toronto Raptors (2001–2002)	C	26,946	13,748	3,058	2 (1994, 1995)	1 (1994)	2 (1994, 1995)	12	2008	
Shaquille O'Neal	Orlando Magic (1992–1996); Los Angeles Lakers (1996–2004); Miami Heat (2004–2008); Phoenix Suns (2008–2009); Cleveland Cavaliers (2009–2010); Boston Celtics (2010–2011)	C	28,596	13,099	3,026	4 (2000, 2001, 2002, 2006)	1 (2000)	3 (2000, 2001, 2002)	15	2016	
Robert Parish	Golden State Warriors (1976–1980); Boston Celtics (1980–1994); Charlotte Hornets (1994–1996); Chicago Bulls (1996–1997)	C	23,334	14,715	2,180	4 (1981, 1984, 1986, 1997)	None	None	9	2003	
Bob Pettit	Milwaukee / St. Louis Hawks (1954–1965)	F	20,880	12,849	2,369	1 (1958)	2 (1956, 1959)	None	11	1971	
Scottie Pippen	Chicago Bulls (1987–1998, 2003–2004); Houston Rockets (1999); Portland Trail Blazers (1999–2003)	F	18,940	7,494	6,135	6 (1991, 1992, 1993, 1996, 1997, 1998)	None	None	7	2010	
Willis Reed	New York Knicks (1964–1974)	C/F	12,183	8,414	1,186	2 (1970, 1973)	1 (1970)	2 (1970, 1973)	7	1982	
Oscar Robertson	Cincinnati Royals (1960–1970); Milwaukee Bucks (1970–1974)	G	26,710	7,804	9,887	1 (1971)	1 (1964)	None	12	1980	
David Robinson	San Antonio Spurs (1989–2003)	C	20,790	10,497	2,441	2 (1999, 2003)	1 (1995)	None	10	2009	
Bill Russell	Boston Celtics (1956–1969)	C	14,522	21,620	4,100	11 (1957, 1959, 1960, 1961, 1962, 1963, 1964, 1965, 1966, 1968, 1969)	5 (1958, 1961, 1962, 1963, 1965)	None	12	1975	
Dolph Schayes	Syracuse Nationals / Philadelphia 76ers (1949–1964)	F	18,438	11,256	3,072	1 (1955)	None	None	12	1973	
Bill Sharman	Washington Capitols (1950–1951); Boston Celtics (1951–1961)	G	12,665	2,779	2,101	4 (1957, 1959, 1960, 1961)	None	None	8	1976	
John Stockton	Utah Jazz (1984–2003)	G	19,711	4,051	15,806	None	None	None	10	2009	
Isiah Thomas	Detroit Pistons (1981–1994)	G	18,822	3,478	9,061	2 (1989, 1990)	None	1 (1990)	12	2000	
Nate Thurmond	San Francisco / Golden State Warriors (1963–1974); Chicago Bulls (1974–1975); Cleveland Cavaliers (1975–1977)	C	14,437	14,464	2,575	None	None	None	7	1985	
Wes Unseld	Baltimore / Capital / Washington Bullets (1968–1981)	C	10,624	13,769	3,822	1 (1978)	1 (1969)	1 (1978)	5	1988	
Bill Walton	Portland Trail Blazers (1974–1979); San Diego / Los Angeles Clippers (1979–1985); Boston Celtics (1985–1988)	C	6,215	4,923	1,590	2 (1977, 1986)	1 (1978)	1 (1977)	2	1993	
Jerry West	Los Angeles Lakers (1960–1974)	G	25,192	5,366	6,238	1 (1972)	None	1 (1969)	14	1980	
Lenny Wilkens	St. Louis Hawks (1960−1968); Seattle SuperSonics (1968–1972); Cleveland Cavaliers (1972–1974); Portland Trail Blazers (1974–1975)	G	17,772	5,030	7,211	None	None	None	9	1989	
James Worthy	Los Angeles Lakers (1982–1994)	F	16,320	4,708	2,791	3 (1985, 1987, 1988)	None	1 (1988)	7	2003	

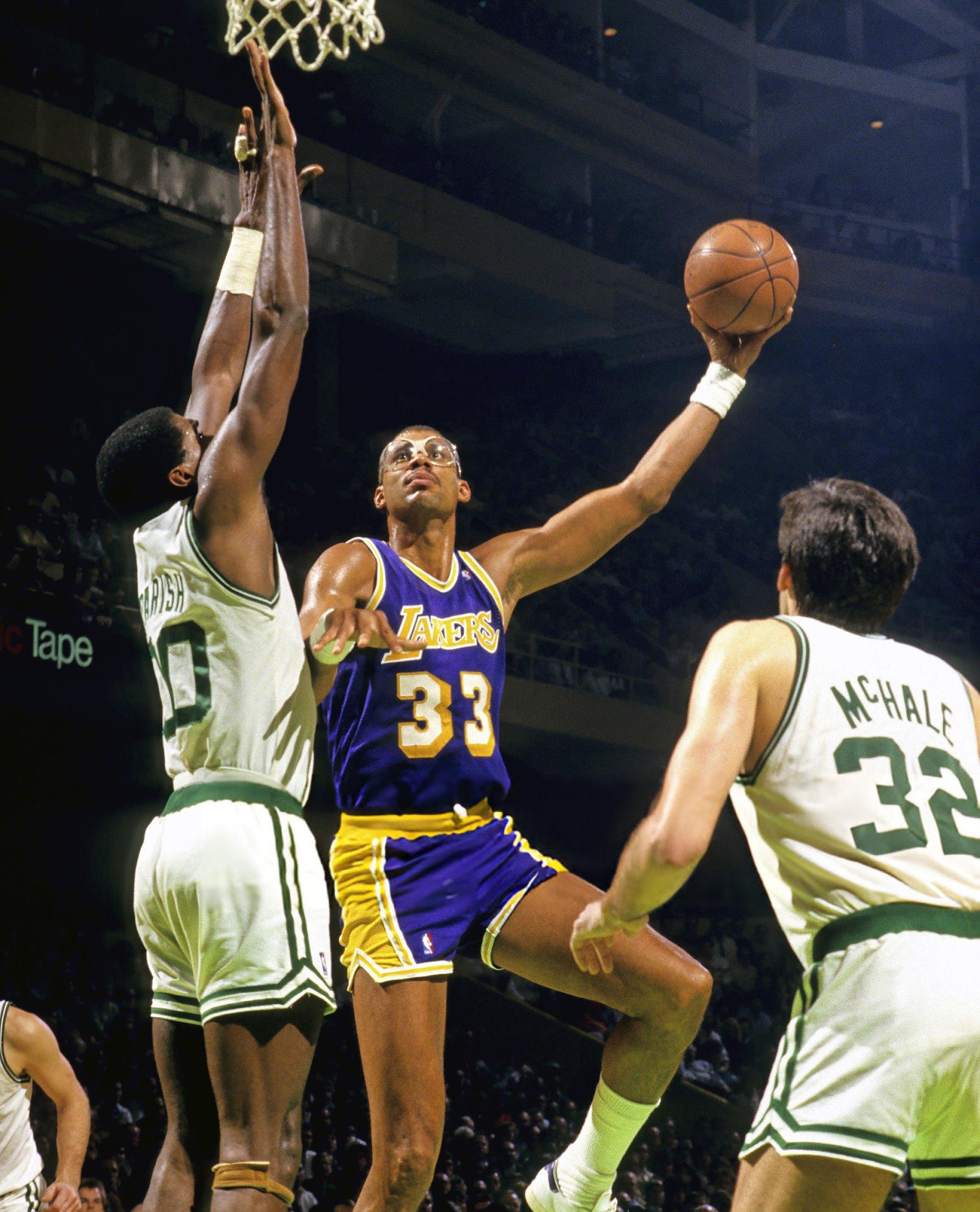
Kareem Abdul-Jabbar, who voted as a player, was selected as one of the 50 Greatest Players in NBA History.

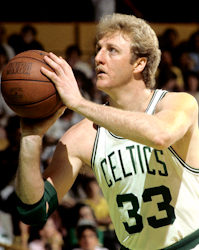
Larry Bird, who voted as a team representative, was selected as one of the 50 Greatest Players in NBA History.

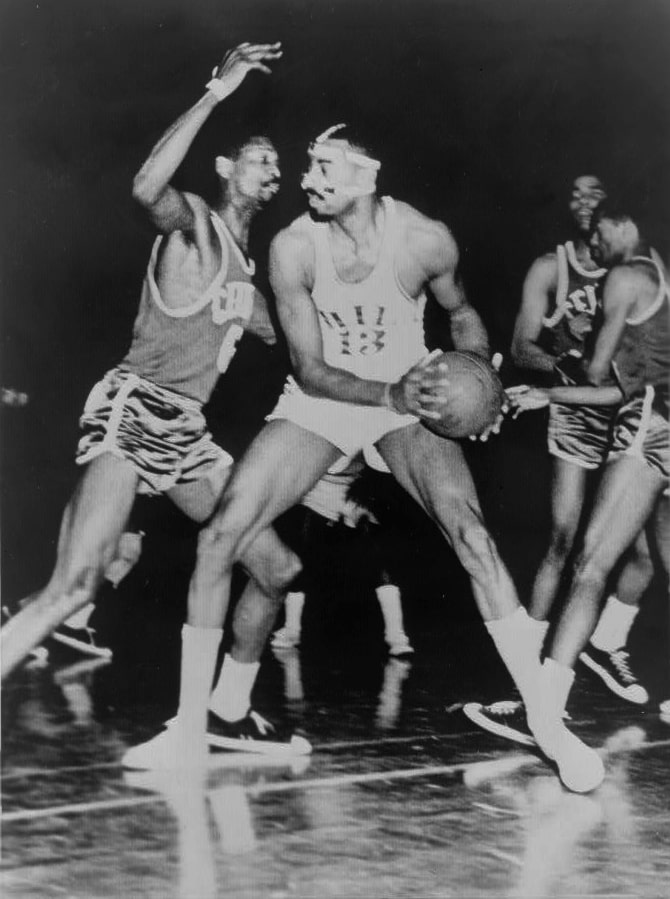
Bill Russell (left) and Wilt Chamberlain (center), who voted as players, were selected as two of the 50 Greatest Players in NBA History.

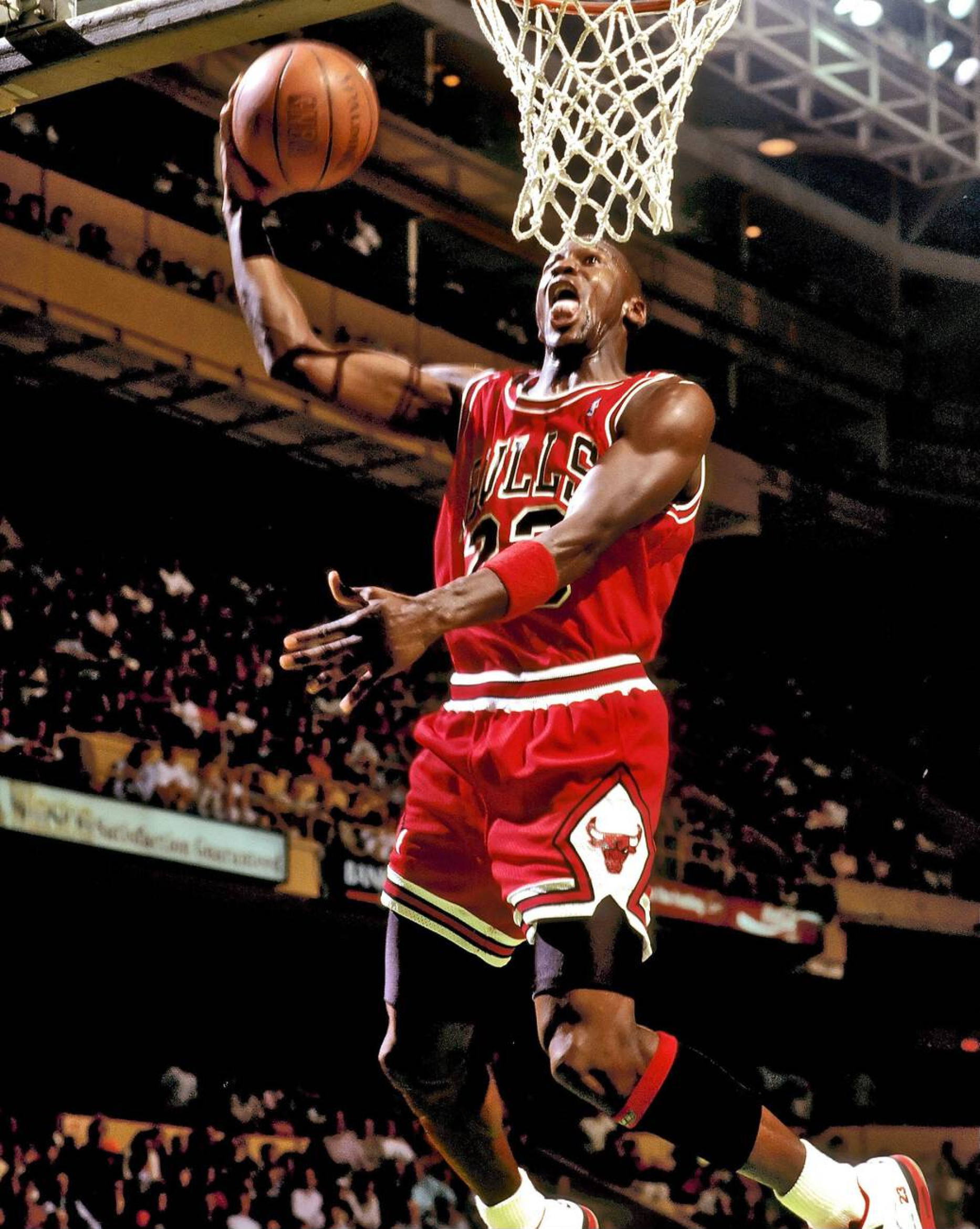
Michael Jordan was active at the time of the announcement of the 50 Greatest Players in NBA History.

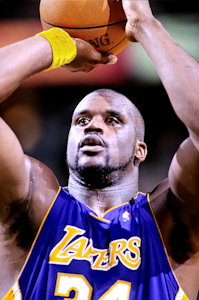
Shaquille O'Neal was the last active member of the 50 Greatest Players in NBA History.

=== Selection process ===
The list was made through unranked voting completed by 50 selected panelists. Sixteen of the panelists were former players voting in their roles as players, 13 were members of the print and broadcast news media, and 21 were team representatives: contemporary and former general managers, head coaches, and executives. Of the last group, 13 were former NBA players. Players were prohibited from voting for themselves. Only three voting former players (Bill Bradley, Johnny Kerr, and Bob Lanier) were not selected to the team.

=== Voters ===
*	Denotes voter who was selected to the 50 Greatest Players list
Voter category	As categorized by the NBA

Name	Voter category
Kareem Abdul-Jabbar*	Player
Marv Albert	Media member
Al Attles	Team
Red Auerbach	Team
Elgin Baylor*	Team
Dave Bing*	Player
Larry Bird*	Team
Marty Blake	Team
Fran Blinebury	Media member
Bill Bradley	Player
Hubie Brown	Team
Wilt Chamberlain*	Player
Mitch Chortkoff	Media member
Bob Cousy*	Player
Billy Cunningham*	Team
Chuck Daly	Team
David DuPree	Media member
Wayne Embry	Team
Julius Erving*	Player
Joe Gilmartin	Media member
Sam Goldaper	Media member
Alex Hannum	Team
Lester Harrison	Team
John Havlicek*	Player
Chick Hearn	Media member
Red Holzman	Team
Phil Jasner	Media member
Magic Johnson*	Player
Johnny Kerr	Player
Leonard Koppett	Media member
Bob Lanier	Player
Frank Layden	Team
Leonard Lewin	Media member
Jack McCallum	Media member
Dick McGuire	Team
George Mikan*	Player
Bob Pettit*	Player
Harvey Pollack	Team
Jack Ramsay	Team
Willis Reed*	Team
Oscar Robertson*	Player
Bill Russell*	Player
Bob Ryan	Media member
Dolph Schayes*	Player
Bill Sharman*	Player
Gene Shue	Team
Isiah Thomas*	Team
Wes Unseld*	Team
Peter Vecsey	Media member
Jerry West*	Team

== Top 10 Coaches in NBA History ==
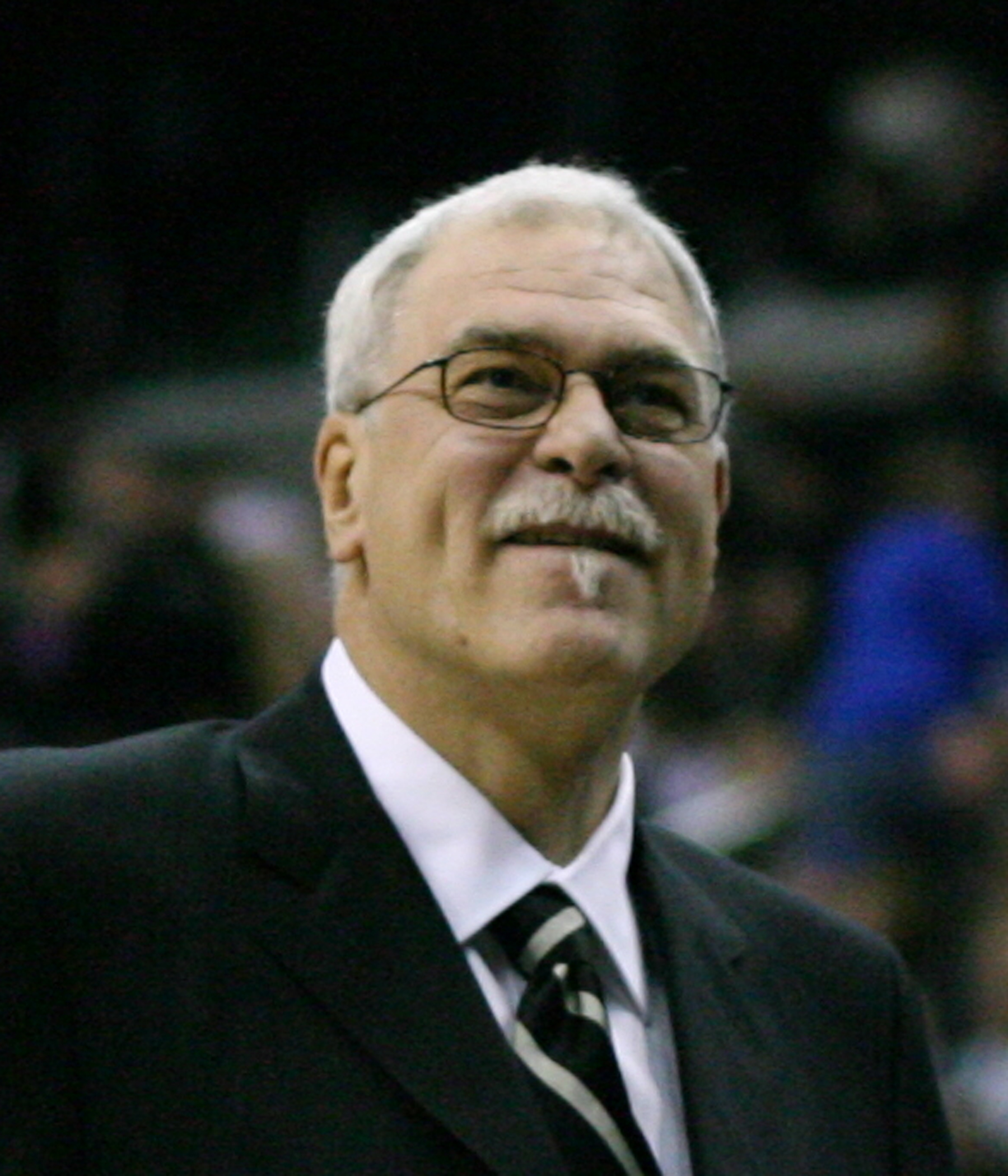
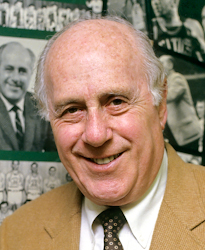
Phil Jackson (left) and Red Auerbach (right) both made the 1996 list of the top ten coaches in NBA history.

Alongside the selection of the 50 greatest players was the selection of the Top 10 Coaches in NBA History. The list was compiled based upon unranked selection undertaken exclusively by members of the print and broadcast media who regularly cover the NBA. All 10 coaches named were alive at the time of the list's announcement, and five of them—Bill Fitch, Phil Jackson, Don Nelson, Pat Riley, and Lenny Wilkens—were then active. Seven have since died: Red Holzman in 1998, Red Auerbach in 2006, Chuck Daly in 2009, Jack Ramsay in 2014, John Kundla in 2017, Bill Fitch in 2022, and Lenny Wilkens in 2025. Jackson was the last of the ten to coach in the NBA; he announced his retirement after the 2010–11 season. Nelson was the only member to have never won a championship as a coach, even though he won five as a player. Wilkens was the only member of the coaches list to have been selected as a member of the players list. All ten coaches are also members of the Naismith Memorial Basketball Hall of Fame, with Fitch the last member inducted in 2019.

Key
Italics	Denotes coach who was active in the NBA at the time of induction

Coach	Team(s) coached (years)^{[a]}	Coaching record	Championships won as coach^{[b]}	Coach of the Year award(s) won	Year of Basketball Hall of Fame induction	Ref.
Red Auerbach	Washington Capitols (1946–1949); Tri-Cities Blackhawks (1949–1950); Boston Celtics (1950–1966)	938–479 (.662)	9 (1957, 1959, 1960, 1961, 1962, 1963, 1964, 1965, 1966)	1 (1965)	1969	
Chuck Daly	Cleveland Cavaliers (1982); Detroit Pistons (1983–1992); New Jersey Nets (1992–1994); Orlando Magic (1997–1999)	638–437 (.593)	2 (1989, 1990)	None	1994	
Bill Fitch	Cleveland Cavaliers (1970–1979); Boston Celtics (1979–1983); Houston Rockets (1983–1988); New Jersey Nets (1989–1992); Los Angeles Clippers (1994–1998)	944–1106 (.460)	1 (1981)	2 (1976, 1980)	2019	
Red Holzman	Milwaukee / St. Louis Hawks (1954–1956); New York Knicks (1967–1982)	696–604 (.535)	2 (1970, 1973)	1 (1970)	1986	
Phil Jackson	Chicago Bulls (1989–1998); Los Angeles Lakers (1999–2004, 2005–2011)	1155–485 (.704)	11 (1991, 1992, 1993, 1996, 1997, 1998, 2000, 2001, 2002, 2009, 2010)	1 (1996)	2007	
John Kundla	Minneapolis Lakers (1948–1959)	423–302 (.583)	5 (1949, 1950, 1952, 1953, 1954)	None	1995	
Don Nelson	Milwaukee Bucks (1976–1987); Golden State Warriors (1988–1995, 2006–2010); New York Knicks (1995–1996); Dallas Mavericks (1997–2005)	1335–1063 (.557)	None	3 (1983, 1985, 1992)	2012	
Jack Ramsay	Philadelphia 76ers (1968–1972); Buffalo Braves (1972–1976); Portland Trail Blazers (1976–1986); Indiana Pacers (1986–1988)	864–783 (.525)	1 (1977)	None	1992	
Pat Riley	Los Angeles Lakers (1981–1990); New York Knicks (1991–1995); Miami Heat (1995–2003, 2005–2008)	1210–694 (.636)	5 (1982, 1985, 1987, 1988, 2006)	3 (1990, 1993, 1997)	2008	
Lenny Wilkens	Seattle SuperSonics (1969–1972, 1977–1985); Portland Trail Blazers (1974–1976); Cleveland Cavaliers (1986–1993); Atlanta Hawks (1993–2000); Toronto Raptors (2000–2003); New York Knicks (2004–2005)	1332–1155 (.536)	1 (1979)	1 (1994)	1998	

== Top 10 Teams in NBA History ==
Also included in the NBA's 50th-anniversary celebration was the selection of the Top 10 Teams in NBA History. The list was compiled based upon unranked selection undertaken exclusively by members of the print and broadcast media who regularly cover the NBA. Teams were chosen from among all single-season individual teams. Each team won the NBA championship, and they combined to average 66 wins per season. The 1995–96 Chicago Bulls had, at the moment, the best single-season record in NBA history with 72 wins.

Six out of the 30 NBA franchises (29 franchises at the time of announcement) had a team named to the list; the Boston Celtics, the Chicago Bulls, the Los Angeles Lakers and the Philadelphia 76ers had two teams selected.

Six players were on the roster of two teams on the list—Wilt Chamberlain with the 1966–67 Sixers and 1971–72 Lakers; James Edwards, Dennis Rodman, and John Salley with the 1988–89 Pistons and 1995–96 Bulls; and Michael Jordan and Scottie Pippen with the Bulls in both 1991–92 and 1995–96. Three other individuals both played for and coached honored teams, all of whom completed this "double" with a single franchise—K. C. Jones with the Celtics as a player in 1964–65 and coach in 1985–86, Billy Cunningham with the Sixers as a player in 1966–67 and coach in 1982–83, and Pat Riley with the Lakers as a player in 1971–72 and coach in 1986–87. Phil Jackson, head coach of the Bulls from 1989 to 1998, was the only man to coach two teams that made the list. Although Jackson was under contract to the Knicks as a player in their 1969–70 championship season, he did not play that season as he was recovering from spinal fusion surgery.

The Hall of Famers listed for each individual team are solely those inducted as players, and do not include those inducted in other roles. Players whose names are italicized were inducted after the announcement of the ten best teams.

Season	Team	Record	Roster and head coach	Players in the Hall of Fame	Players on the 50 Greatest Players list	Ref.
1964–65	Boston Celtics	62–18 (.775)	Ron Bonham, Mel Counts, John Havlicek, Tom Heinsohn, K. C. Jones, Sam Jones, Willie Naulls, Bevo Nordmann, Bill Russell, Tom Sanders, Larry Siegfried, John Thompson, Gerry Ward, coach Red Auerbach^{[d]}	5 (K. Jones, S. Jones, Heinsohn, Russell, Havlicek)^{[e]}	3 (S. Jones, Russell, Havlicek)	
1966–67	Philadelphia 76ers	68–13 (.840)	Wilt Chamberlain, Larry Costello, Billy Cunningham, Dave Gambee, Hal Greer, Matt Guokas, Luke Jackson, Wali Jones, Bill Melchionni, Chet Walker, Bob Weiss, coach Alex Hannum^{[d]}	4 (Greer, Chamberlain, Cunningham, Walker)	3 (Greer, Chamberlain, Cunningham)	
1969–70	New York Knicks	60–22 (.732)	Dick Barnett, Nate Bowman, Bill Bradley, Dave DeBusschere, Walt Frazier, Bill Hosket, Don May, Willis Reed, Mike Riordan, Cazzie Russell, Dave Stallworth, John Warren, coach Red Holzman^{[d]}	5 (Reed, Bradley, DeBusschere, Frazier, Barnett)	3 (Frazier, DeBusschere, Reed)	
1971–72	Los Angeles Lakers	69–13 (.841)	Elgin Baylor, Wilt Chamberlain, Jim Cleamons, LeRoy Ellis, Keith Erickson, Gail Goodrich, Happy Hairston, Jim McMillian, Pat Riley, Flynn Robinson, John Trapp, Jerry West, coach Bill Sharman^{[d]}	4 (Goodrich, West, Chamberlain, Baylor^{[f]})	3 (West, Chamberlain, Baylor)	
1982–83	Philadelphia 76ers	65–17 (.793)	J. J. Anderson, Maurice Cheeks, Earl Cureton, Franklin Edwards, Julius Erving, Marc Iavaroni, Clemon Johnson, Reggie Johnson, Bobby Jones, Moses Malone, Mark McNamara, Clint Richardson, Russ Schoene, Andrew Toney, coach Billy Cunningham	4 (Erving, Malone, Cheeks, Jones)	2 (Erving, Malone)	
1985–86	Boston Celtics	67–15 (.817)	Danny Ainge, Larry Bird, Rick Carlisle, Dennis Johnson, Greg Kite, Kevin McHale, Robert Parish, Jerry Sichting, David Thirdkill, Sam Vincent, Bill Walton, Scott Wedman, Sly Williams, coach K. C. Jones	5 (McHale, Bird, Parish, Walton, Johnson)	4 (McHale, Bird, Parish, Walton)	
1986–87	Los Angeles Lakers	65–17 (.793)	Kareem Abdul-Jabbar, Adrian Branch, Frank Brickowski, Michael Cooper, A.C. Green, Magic Johnson, Wes Matthews, Kurt Rambis, Mike Smrek, Byron Scott, Billy Thompson, Mychal Thompson, James Worthy, coach Pat Riley^{[d]}	4 (Cooper, Johnson, Worthy, Abdul-Jabbar)	3 (Johnson, Worthy, Abdul-Jabbar)	
1988–89	Detroit Pistons	63–19 (.768)	Mark Aguirre, Adrian Dantley, Darryl Dawkins, Fennis Dembo, Joe Dumars, James Edwards, Steve Harris, Vinnie Johnson, Bill Laimbeer, John Long, Rick Mahorn, Pace Mannion, Dennis Rodman, Jim Rowinski, John Salley, Isiah Thomas, Micheal Williams, coach Chuck Daly^{[d]}	4 (Thomas, Dumars, Dantley, Rodman)	1 (Thomas)	
1991–92	Chicago Bulls	67–15 (.817)	B. J. Armstrong, Bill Cartwright, Horace Grant, Bob Hansen, Craig Hodges, Dennis Hopson, Michael Jordan, Stacey King, Cliff Levingston, Chuck Nevitt, John Paxson, Will Perdue, Scottie Pippen, Mark Randall, Rory Sparrow, Scott Williams, coach Phil Jackson^{[d]}	2 (Jordan, Pippen)	2 (Jordan, Pippen)	
1995–96	Chicago Bulls	72–10 (.878)	Randy Brown, Jud Buechler, Jason Caffey, James Edwards, Jack Haley, Ron Harper, Michael Jordan, Steve Kerr, Luc Longley, Toni Kukoč, Scottie Pippen, Dennis Rodman, John Salley, Dickey Simpkins, Bill Wennington, coach Phil Jackson^{[d]}	4 (Jordan, Pippen, Rodman, Kukoč)	2 (Jordan, Pippen)	

=== Notes ===
- ^{a} American Basketball Association (ABA) teams other than those admitted into the NBA in 1976 are not included; each year is linked to an article about that particular NBA season.
- ^{b} Each year is linked to an article about the NBA Finals in that year.
- ^{d} Inducted into Naismith Memorial Basketball Hall of Fame as coach; Bill Sharman was inducted as both a player and a coach
- ^{e} A sixth player on this team, Sanders, was inducted into the Hall as a contributor in August 2011.
- ^{f} Having been injured in the second game, Baylor missed the remainder of the 1971–72 season. He retired at the beginning of the next season.

== See also ==
- ABA All-Time Team
- NBA anniversary teams
