= 1968 NCAA Men's Basketball All-Americans =

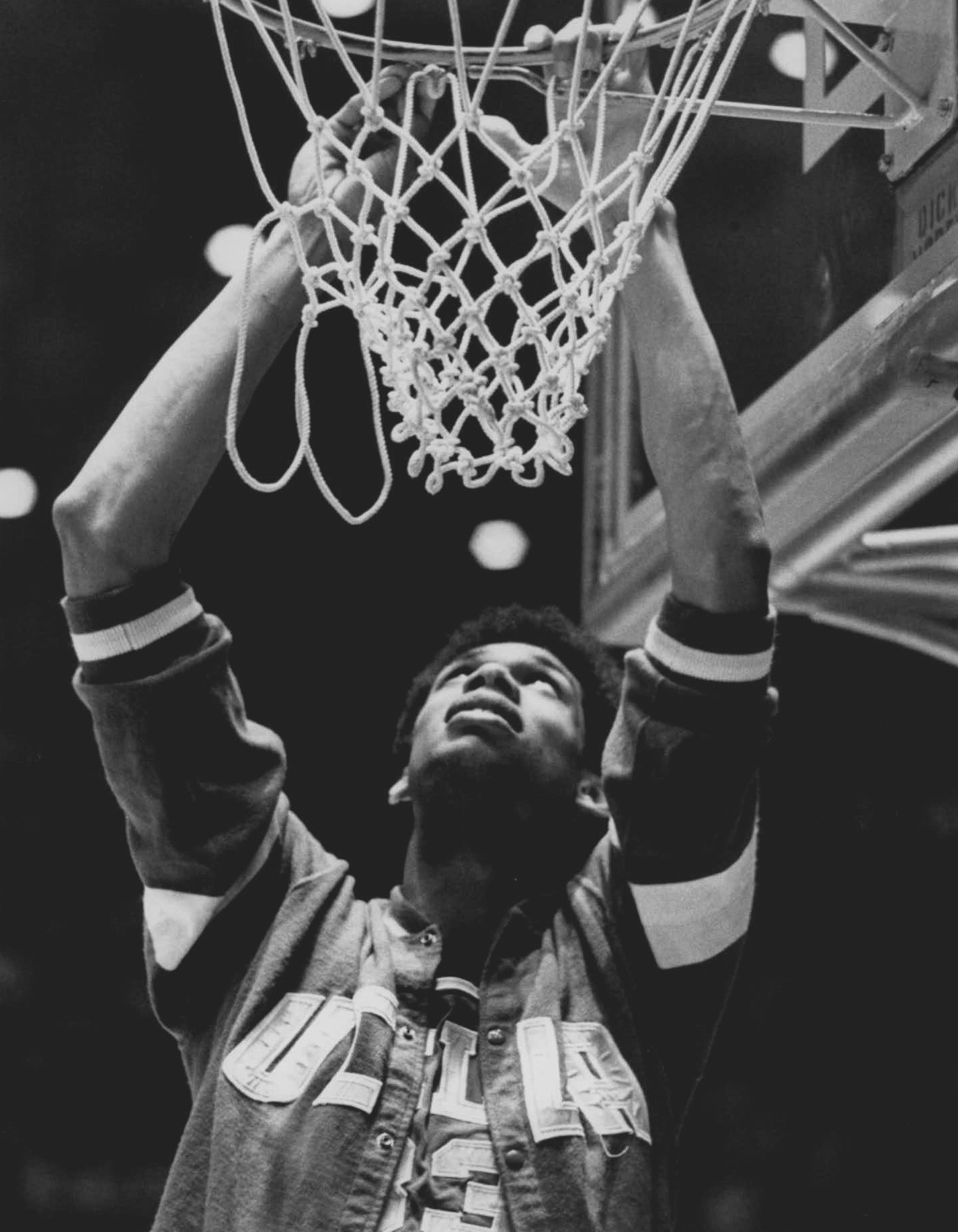
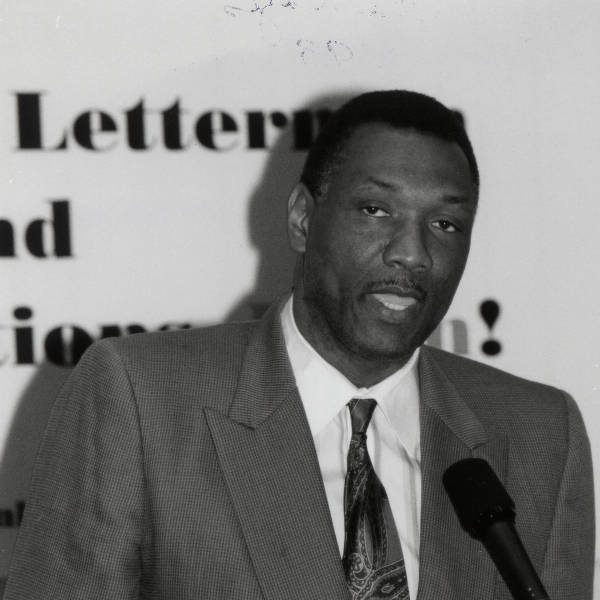
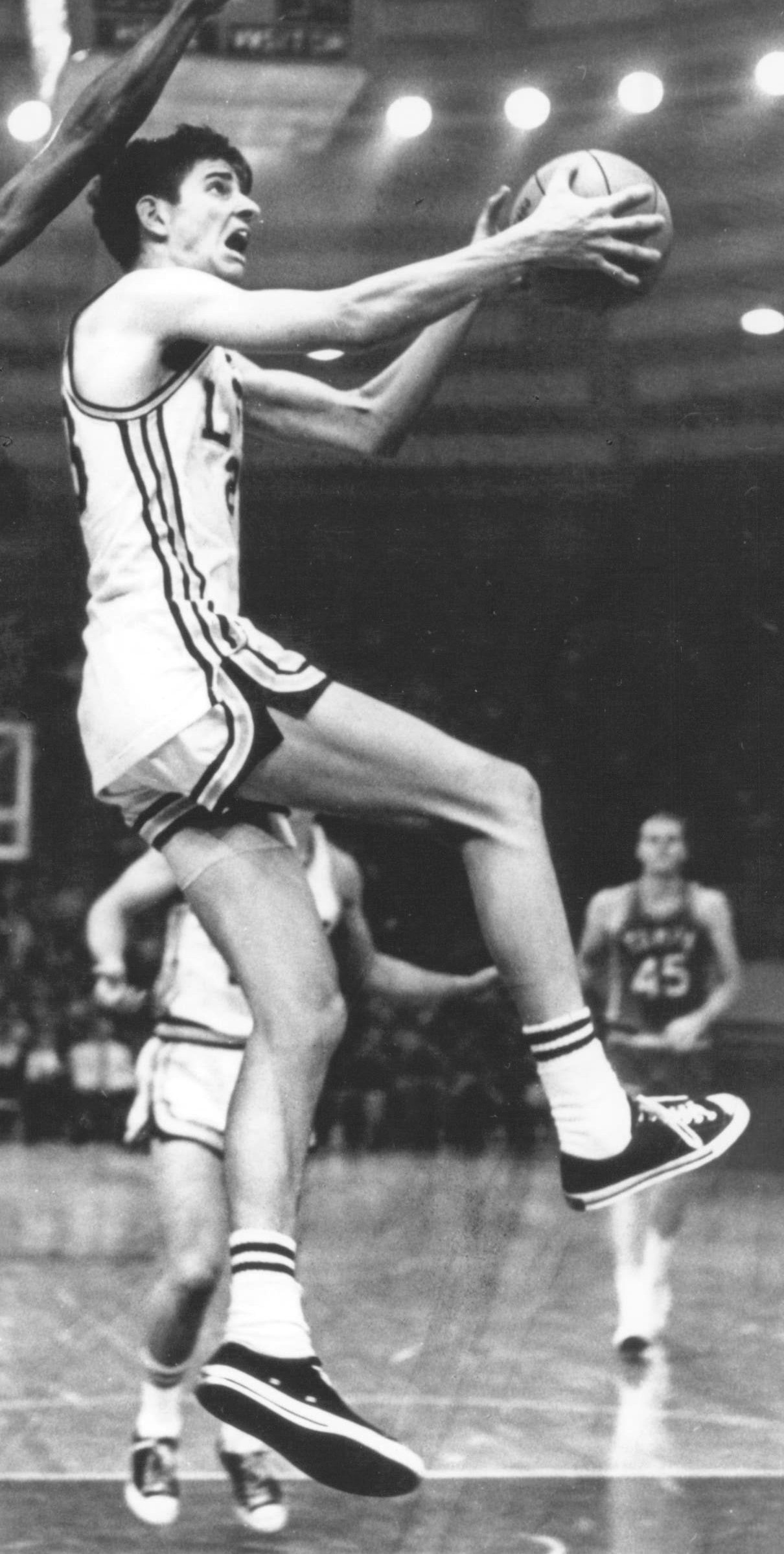
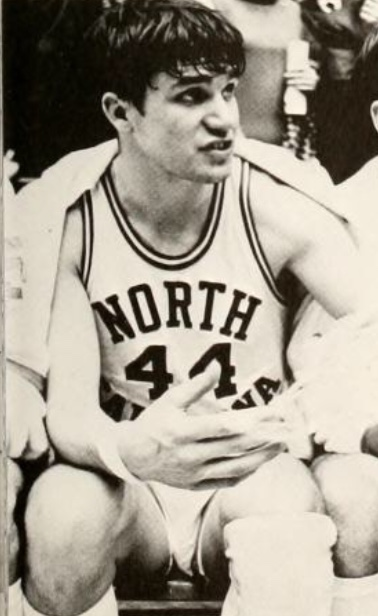
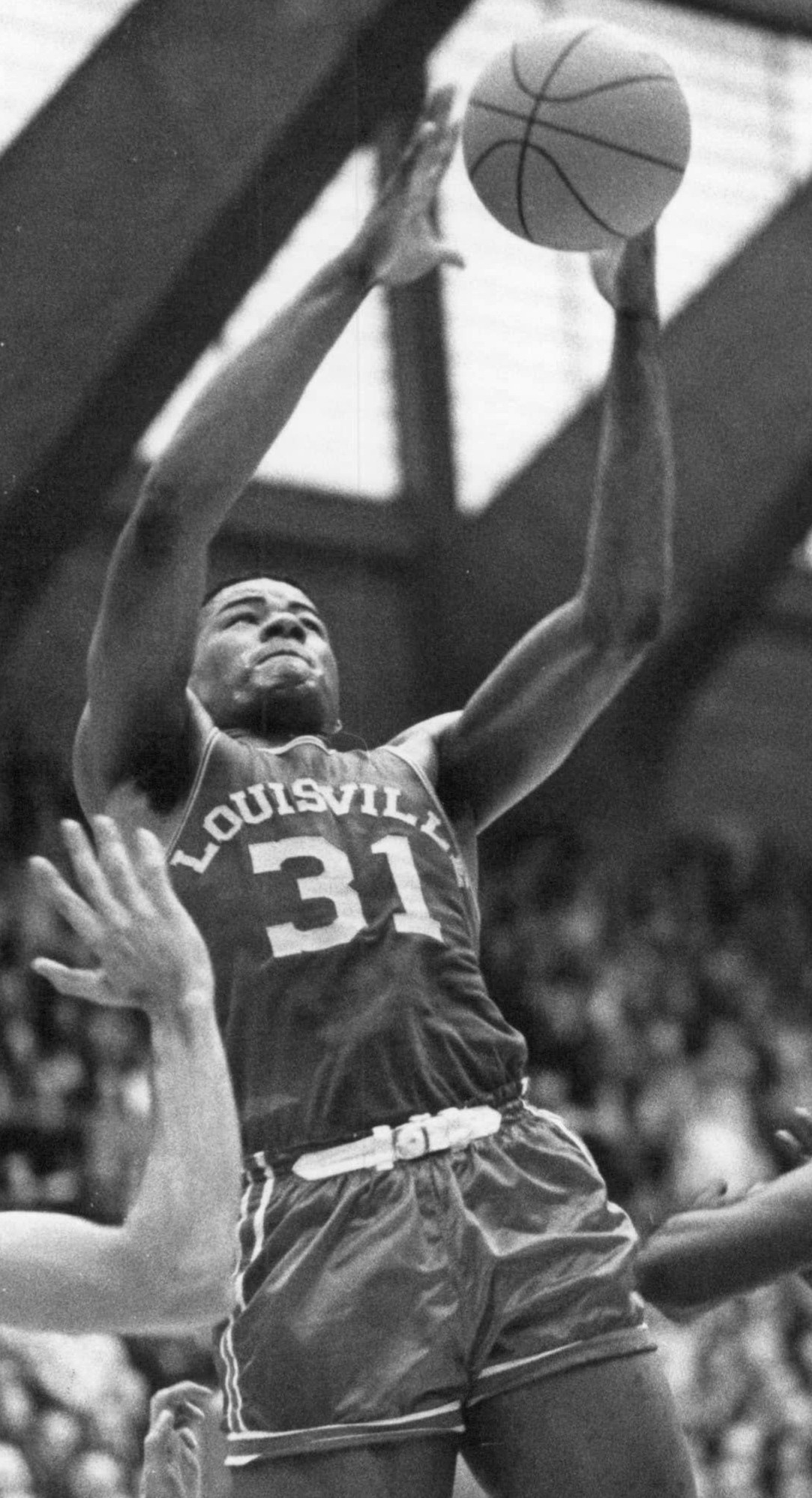
- The 1968 consensus first team. Clockwise from top left: Alcindor, Hayes, Unseld, Miller, Maravich.
- Awarded for: 1967–68 NCAA University Division men's basketball season

The consensus 1968 College Basketball All-American team was determined by aggregating the results of four major All-American teams. To earn "consensus" status, a player must win honors from a majority of the following teams: the Associated Press, the USBWA, The United Press International and the National Association of Basketball Coaches.

== 1968 Consensus All-America team ==
Consensus First Team
Player	Position	Class	Team
Lew Alcindor	C	Junior	UCLA
Elvin Hayes	F/C	Senior	Houston
Pete Maravich	G/F	Sophomore	Louisiana State
Larry Miller	F	Senior	North Carolina
Wes Unseld	C	Senior	Louisville

Consensus Second Team
Player	Position	Class	Team
Lucius Allen	G	Junior	UCLA
Bob Lanier	C	Sophomore	St. Bonaventure
Don May	G/F	Senior	Dayton
Calvin Murphy	G	Sophomore	Niagara
Jo Jo White	G	Junior	Kansas

== Individual All-America teams ==
All-America Team
All-America Team	First team		Second team		Third team	
All-America Team	Player	School	Player	School	Player	School
Associated Press	Lew Alcindor	UCLA	Lucius Allen	UCLA	Mike Lewis	Duke
Associated Press	Elvin Hayes	Houston	Bob Lanier	St. Bonaventure	Rick Mount	Purdue
Associated Press	Pete Maravich	Louisiana State	Don May	Dayton	Mike Warren	UCLA
Associated Press	Larry Miller	North Carolina	Calvin Murphy	Niagara	Jo Jo White	Kansas
Associated Press	Wes Unseld	Louisville	Neal Walk	Florida	Sam Williams	Iowa
USBWA	Lew Alcindor	UCLA	No second or third teams (10-man first team)			
USBWA	Elvin Hayes	Houston	No second or third teams (10-man first team)			
USBWA	Merv Jackson	Utah	No second or third teams (10-man first team)			
USBWA	Bob Lanier	St. Bonaventure	No second or third teams (10-man first team)			
USBWA	Pete Maravich	Louisiana State	No second or third teams (10-man first team)			
USBWA	Larry Miller	North Carolina	No second or third teams (10-man first team)			
USBWA	Calvin Murphy	Niagara	No second or third teams (10-man first team)			
USBWA	Wes Unseld	Louisville	No second or third teams (10-man first team)			
USBWA	Mike Warren	UCLA	No second or third teams (10-man first team)			
USBWA	Jo Jo White	Kansas	No second or third teams (10-man first team)			
NABC	Lew Alcindor	UCLA	Lucius Allen	UCLA	Merv Jackson	Utah
NABC	Elvin Hayes	Houston	Bob Lanier	St. Bonaventure	Mike Lewis	Duke
NABC	Pete Maravich	Louisiana State	Don May	Dayton	Rick Mount	Purdue
NABC	Larry Miller	North Carolina	Calvin Murphy	Niagara	Don Smith	Iowa State
NABC	Wes Unseld	Louisville	Jo Jo White	Kansas	Neal Walk	Florida
UPI	Lew Alcindor	UCLA	Lucius Allen	UCLA	Mike Lewis	Duke
UPI	Elvin Hayes	Houston	Bob Lanier	St. Bonaventure	Jim McMillian	Columbia
UPI	Pete Maravich	Louisiana State	Don May	Dayton	Neal Walk	Florida
UPI	Calvin Murphy	Niagara	Larry Miller	North Carolina	Mike Warren	UCLA
UPI	Wes Unseld	Louisville	Rick Mount	Purdue	Jo Jo White	Kansas

AP Honorable Mention:

- Joe Allen, Bradley
- Butch Beard, Louisville
- Tom Boerwinkle, Tennessee
- Mike Casey, Kentucky
- Don Chaney, Houston
- Russ Critchfield, California
- Tom Hagan, Vanderbilt
- Shaler Halimon, Utah State
- Bill Hewitt, Southern California
- Simmie Hill, West Texas
- Bill Hosket, Ohio State
- Harry Hollines, Denver
- Merv Jackson, Utah
- Bill Justus, Tennessee
- Willie McCarter, Drake
- Jim McKean, Washington State
- Jim McMillian, Columbia
- Ron Nelson, New Mexico
- Bob Portman, Creighton
- Charley Powell, Xavier (LA)
- Bill Schutsky, Army
- Lynn Shackelford, UCLA
- Don Smith, Iowa State
- George Thompson, Marquette
- Rich Travis, Oklahoma City
- Ron Williams, West Virginia

== Academic All-Americans ==
On April 28, 1968, CoSIDA announced the 1968 Academic All-America team. The following is the 1967–68 Academic All-America Men's Basketball Team as selected by CoSIDA:

First Team
Player	School	Class
Bob Arnzen	Notre Dame	Junior
Dennis Awtrey	Santa Clara	Sophomore
Terry Driscoll	Boston College	Junior
Bill Hosket	Ohio State	Senior
Bill Justus	Tennessee	Junior
Rich Niemann	Saint Louis	Senior
Cliff Parsons	Air Force	Junior
Earl Seyfert	Kansas State	Senior
Dave Scholz	Illinois	Junior
Ted Ware	Virginia Tech	Senior

Second Team
Player	School	Class
Ron Becker	New Mexico	Sophomore
Pat Frink	Colorado	Senior
Terry Habig	Tulane	Junior
Fred Holden	Louisville	Senior
Bill Langheld	Fordham	Senior
Lyndon Mackey	Utah	Senior
Richie Mahaffey	Clemson	Sophomore
Gary Overbeck	Texas	Senior
Gary Petersmeyer	Stanford	Senior
Jim Youngblood	Georgia	Senior

== See also ==
- 1967–68 NCAA University Division men's basketball season
