= John Warren (basketball, born 1947) =

American basketball player

Personal information
- Born: July 7, 1947 (age 79) Sparta, Georgia, U.S.
- Listed height: 6 ft 3 in (1.91 m)
- Listed weight: 180 lb (82 kg)

Career information
- High school: Far Rockaway (Queens, New York)
- College: St. John's (1966–1969)
- NBA draft: 1969: 1st round, 11th overall pick
- Drafted by: New York Knicks
- Playing career: 1969–1976
- Position: Shooting guard / small forward
- Number: 16, 11

Career history
- 1969–1970: New York Knicks
- 1970–1974: Cleveland Cavaliers
- 1975–1976: Long Island Sounds

Career highlights
- NBA champion (1970)

Career NBA statistics
- Points: 1,814 (6.0 ppg)
- Rebounds: 687 (2.3 rpg)
- Assists: 564 (1.9 apg)
- Stats at NBA.com
- Stats at Basketball Reference

John Warren Jr. (born July 7, 1947) is an American former professional basketball player. He was a 6'3" swingman.

Born in Sparta, Georgia, Warren attended Far Rockaway High School in Queens, New York, and played college basketball for the St. John's Red Storm from 1966 to 1969. He scored 1,306 points in 84 games and was considered his team's strongest defender. The St. John's basketball media guide says that Warren "was perhaps St. John’s most complete player".

After his collegiate career, Warren played five seasons (1969–1974) in the National Basketball Association as a member of the New York Knicks and Cleveland Cavaliers. He averaged 6.0 points per game and won a league championship with New York in 1970. He currently holds the record for most field goals made without a miss in Cleveland Cavaliers history (12 for 12).

While playing for the Cavaliers on December 9, 1970, Warren mistakenly scored for the Portland Trail Blazers on a fast break lay-up at the beginning of the fourth quarter. Leroy Ellis of Portland received credit for the points, although he had tried to block the shot.

Warren was elected to the St. John's Hall of Fame in 1986. He currently resides in New York with his wife, Rhia. He has two children, John III and Joy.

== Career statistics ==
Legend
GP	Games played	GS	Games started	MPG	Minutes per game
FG%	Field goal percentage	3P%	3-point field goal percentage	FT%	Free throw percentage
RPG	Rebounds per game	APG	Assists per game	SPG	Steals per game
BPG	Blocks per game	PPG	Points per game	**Bold**	Career high
†	Won an NBA championship

=== NBA/ABA ===
==== Regular season ====
Year	Team	GP	GS	MPG	FG%	FT%	RPG	APG	SPG	BPG	PPG
1969–70†	New York	44	0	6.2	.407	.686	.9	.7			2.5
1970–71	Cleveland	**82**		**31.8**	.423	.829	**4.2**	**4.2**			**11.5**
1971–72	Cleveland	68		14.3	.417	.845	2.0	1.3			5.0
1972–73	Cleveland	40		7.3	**.486**	**.947**	1.1	.9			3.2
1973–74	Cleveland	69		11.4	.454	.854	1.9	.9	.4	.1	4.3
Career		303	0	16.3	.430	.827	2.3	1.9	.4	.1	6.0

==== Playoffs ====
Year	Team	GP	GS	MPG	FG%	FT%	RPG	APG	PPG
1970†	New York	10	0	2.2	.400	–	.3	.2	.4
