= Belmont High School (Ohio) =

Coordinates: 39.735°N 84.152°W

Location
- 2615 Wayne Ave; Dayton, Ohio 45420; USA

Information
- Type: Public secondary
- Teaching staff: 62.00 (FTE)
- Grades: 7-12
- Enrollment: 1,124 (2023–2024)
- Student to teacher ratio: 18.13
- Colors: Red & Columbia Blue
- Mascot: Bison
- Website: Belmont Website

Belmont High School is 1 of 6 high schools in the Dayton Public Schools school district. The school is located in Dayton, Ohio, and serves approximately 1000 students. The school mascot is the bison. Belmont High School did not meet any of the 13 indicators for the 2016–2017 school year on the State of Ohio Department of Education Report Card, and therefore received an 'F' grade. In addition, the school received a 38.9% score with a grade of 'F' on the Performance Index section of the Report Card as well. The school opened on September 10, 1956 for students in 9th through 11th grades, the original building was closed following the 2010-2011 school year and would later be demolished in March 2012. Being replaced with a new building.

The Belmont High School football team competes in the American Division of the Southwest Ohio Public League. All other athletic teams compete in the Dayton City League.

== Notable alumni ==
- Martin Bayless, Former NFL player
- Bill Hosket Jr., former professional basketball player
- Don May, former professional basketball player
- Chuck McKibben, voice actor, broadcast producer/director, voice-over coach, and audiobook reader
- Bud Olsen, former professional basketball player
- Mike Turner, Congressman
- Harold Leighton Weller, conductor and music educator

== Ohio High School Athletic Association State Championships ==
- Boys Basketball – 1964
- Boys Gymnastics - 1967
