= Nate Bowman =

American basketball player (1943–1984)

Personal information
- Born: March 19, 1943 Fort Worth, Texas, U.S.
- Died: December 11, 1984 (aged 41) New York City, New York, U.S.
- Listed height: 6 ft 10 in (2.08 m)
- Listed weight: 230 lb (104 kg)

Career information
- High school: Kirkpatrick (Fort Worth, Texas)
- College: Wichita State (1962–1965)
- NBA draft: 1965: 1st round, 7th overall pick
- Drafted by: Cincinnati Royals
- Playing career: 1965–1973
- Position: Center
- Number: 12, 17, 13

Career history
- 1965–1966: Johnston C.J.'s
- 1966: Chicago Bulls
- 1966–1967: Asbury Park Boardwalkers
- 1967–1970: New York Knicks
- 1970–1971: Buffalo Braves
- 1971–1972: Pittsburgh Condors
- 1972–1973: Wilkes-Barre Barons

Career highlights
- NBA champion (1970); First-team All-MVC (1964)

Career NBA and ABA statistics
- Points: 745 (2.9 ppg)
- Rebounds: 878 (3.4 rpg)
- Assists: 175 (0.7 apg)
- Stats at NBA.com
- Stats at Basketball Reference

Nathan "Nate the Snake" Bowman (March 19, 1943 – December 11, 1984) was an American basketball player born in Fort Worth, Texas.

A 6'10" center from Wichita State University, Bowman played five seasons (1966–1971) in the National Basketball Association and one season (1971–1972) in the American Basketball Association as a member of the Chicago Bulls, New York Knicks, Buffalo Braves, and Pittsburgh Condors. He won an NBA Championship as a reserve for the Knicks in 1970. In his NBA/ABA career, Bowman tallied 745 total points and 878 total rebounds. He was a good rebounder, but a poor shooter who had a problem with committing personal fouls, thus earning the nickname "Nate the Snake." In his NBA/ABA career, he committed more personal fouls than he scored field goals.

Bowman was one of several players involved in a November 20, 1968, brawl between the Knicks and Atlanta Hawks at Atlanta's Alexander Memorial Coliseum. The fight eventually spilled into the stands, where fans grabbed Bowman so that Atlanta's Bill Bridges could land a punch. None of the participants were fined more than $25.

Bowman was a swinger and attended swing parties at actor Ted Ross's house.

Bowman died of cardiac arrest on December 11, 1984, in New York City. He had finished an audition for a Miller Brewing Company television commercial when he began to complain about chest pains. Bowman arrived at Roosevelt-St. Luke's Hospital with no vital signs and died in the emergency room.

== Career statistics ==
Legend
GP	Games played	GS	Games started	MPG	Minutes per game
FG%	Field goal percentage	3P%	3-point field goal percentage	FT%	Free throw percentage
RPG	Rebounds per game	APG	Assists per game	SPG	Steals per game
BPG	Blocks per game	PPG	Points per game	**Bold**	Career high
†	Won an NBA championship

=== NBA/ABA ===
==== Regular season ====
Year	Team	GP	GS	MPG	FG%	3P%	FT%	RPG	APG	PPG
1966–67	Chicago	9		7.2	.381		**.750**	3.1	.2	2.4
1967–68	New York	42	0	6.5	.388		.667	2.7	.5	2.7
1968–69	New York	67	**1**	9.1	.363		.475	3.3	.8	2.9
1969–70†	New York	**81**	**1**	9.2	**.417**		.519	3.2	.6	2.9
1970–71	Buffalo	44		11.0	.392		.526	3.9	**.9**	**3.1**
1971–72	Pittsburgh (ABA)	18		**12.1**	.358	.000	.556	**4.8**	.7	2.4
Career (NBA)		243	2	8.9	.390		.527	3.3	.7	2.9
Career (overall)		261	2	9.1	.388	.000	.529	3.4	.7	2.9

==== Playoffs ====
Year	Team	GP	GS	MPG	FG%	FT%	RPG	APG	PPG
1968	New York	1	0	6.0	.000	–	3.0	.0	.0
1969	New York	10	0	6.2	.267	**1.000**	**3.2**	**.3**	1.1
1970†	New York	**18**	**1**	**7.1**	**.383**	.700	2.4	**.3**	**2.4**
Career		29	1	6.8	.333	.769	2.7	.3	1.9
