= Don May (basketball) =

American basketball player (born 1946)

Personal information
- Born: January 3, 1946 (age 80) Dayton, Ohio, U.S.
- Listed height: 6 ft 4 in (1.93 m)
- Listed weight: 200 lb (91 kg)

Career information
- High school: Belmont (Dayton, Ohio)
- College: Dayton (1965–1968)
- NBA draft: 1968: 3rd round, 30th overall pick
- Drafted by: New York Knicks
- Playing career: 1968–1975
- Position: Small forward
- Number: 5, 22, 34, 23

Career history
- 1968–1970: New York Knicks
- 1970–1971: Buffalo Braves
- 1971–1973: Atlanta Hawks
- 1973–1974: Philadelphia 76ers
- 1974–1975: Kansas City–Omaha Kings

Career highlights
- NBA champion (1970); 2× Consensus second-team All-American (1967, 1968)

Career statistics
- Points: 3,339 (8.8 ppg)
- Rebounds: 1,309 (3.5 rpg)
- Assists: 389 (1.0 apg)
- Stats at NBA.com
- Stats at Basketball Reference

Donald John May (born January 3, 1946) is an American former professional basketball player who played college basketball for the Dayton Flyers and was twice chosen as consensus second-team All-American (1967–1968). His professional career lasted from 1968 to 1975, and he played for the NBA champion New York Knicks in 1970.

== Early life ==
Don May was born in Dayton, Ohio, one of seven children of Edward S. May and Stella (Streit) May, and attended Belmont High School, where he played alongside another future college All-American and NBA player, Bill Hosket. The two once combined for 88 points in one game (50 by Hosket, 38 by May). Belmont captured the 1964 Ohio state championship with ease, winning the state semifinal and final by 24 and 29 points, respectively. Coached by John Ross, the Bison went 26-1 (with the loss in overtime after both May and Hosket fouled out) and May and Hosket were the first teammates ever to be named first-team All-Ohio.

== College career ==
The 6'4" forward attended the hometown University of Dayton. As a sophomore in 1965–66, he averaged 20.3 points and 11.4 rebounds per game as the Flyers went 23-6 and advanced to the NCAA Tournament Sweet Sixteen.

In his junior year of 1966–67, May increased his averages to 22.2 points and 16.7 rebounds per game as the Flyers went 25-6 and May was named consensus second-team All-American. The Flyers advanced to the NCAA tournament Final Four where, led by May's 34 points and 15 rebounds, they upset fourth-ranked North Carolina 76–62. In the NCAA title game, the Flyers lost 79–64 to UCLA and future hall-of-famer sophomore Lew Alcindor despite May's 21 points and 17 rebounds.

As a senior, May averaged 23.4 points and 15.0 rebounds per game as the Flyers went 21–9. He was MVP of the 1967–1968 National Invitation Tournament (NIT), in which Dayton defeated the University of Kansas and its star guard Jo Jo White in the title game. May was again a consensus second-team All-American.

May's 1,980 career points and 1,301 rebounds are both second in Dayton history.

== NBA career ==
May was selected in the third round of the 1968 NBA draft by the New York Knicks as well as in the third round of the 1968 ABA Draft by the Indiana Pacers. He signed with the Knicks.

May played seven seasons (1968–1975) in the National Basketball Association as a member of the New York Knicks, Buffalo Braves, Atlanta Hawks, Philadelphia 76ers, and Kansas City-Omaha Kings. He averaged 8.8 points per game in his career and won an NBA championship with the Knicks in 1970. His high school teammate, Bill Hosket, was also on the team.

== Personal life ==
May was elected to the University of Dayton Athletic Hall of Fame in 1974 and to the Ohio Basketball Hall of Fame in 2007. In 2010, he attended the 40th anniversary celebration of the New York Knicks 1970 NBA championship season.

== Career statistics ==
Legend
GP	Games played	GS	Games started	MPG	Minutes per game
FG%	Field goal percentage	3P%	3-point field goal percentage	FT%	Free throw percentage
RPG	Rebounds per game	APG	Assists per game	SPG	Steals per game
BPG	Blocks per game	PPG	Points per game	**Bold**	Career high
†	Won an NBA championship

=== NBA ===
==== Regular season ====
Year	Team	GP	GS	MPG	FG%	FT%	RPG	APG	SPG	BPG	PPG
1968–69	New York	48	2	11.7	.363	.724	2.4	.7			4.4
1969–70†	New York	37	0	6.4	.386	**.947**	1.4	.5			2.6
1970–71	Buffalo	**76**		**35.1**	.471	.791	**7.5**	**2.0**			**20.2**
1971–72	Atlanta	75		17.1	.492	.768	2.9	.7			7.9
1972–73	Atlanta	32		9.9	.455	.710	2.1	.7			4.5
1972–73	Philadelphia	26	0	23.2	.441	.855	5.5	1.7			11.9
1973–74	Philadelphia	56	**4**	14.5	.414	.873	2.4	1.1	**.4**	**.1**	7.0
1974–75	Kansas City–Omaha	29		4.8	**.500**	.833	.4	.2	.1	**.1**	2.2
Career		379	6	17.5	.453	.798	3.5	1.0	.3	.1	8.8

==== Playoffs ====
Year	Team	GP	GS	MPG	FG%	FT%	RPG	APG	PPG
1969	New York	**9**	0	9.8	.300	**.778**	2.6	**.9**	2.8
1970†	New York	2	0	3.5	**.667**	–	.0	.0	2.0
1972	Atlanta	3	0	**10.3**	.333	.750	**2.7**	.3	**4.0**
Career		14	0	9.0	.333	.765	2.2	.6	2.9
