= Willis Reed =

American basketball player (1942–2023)

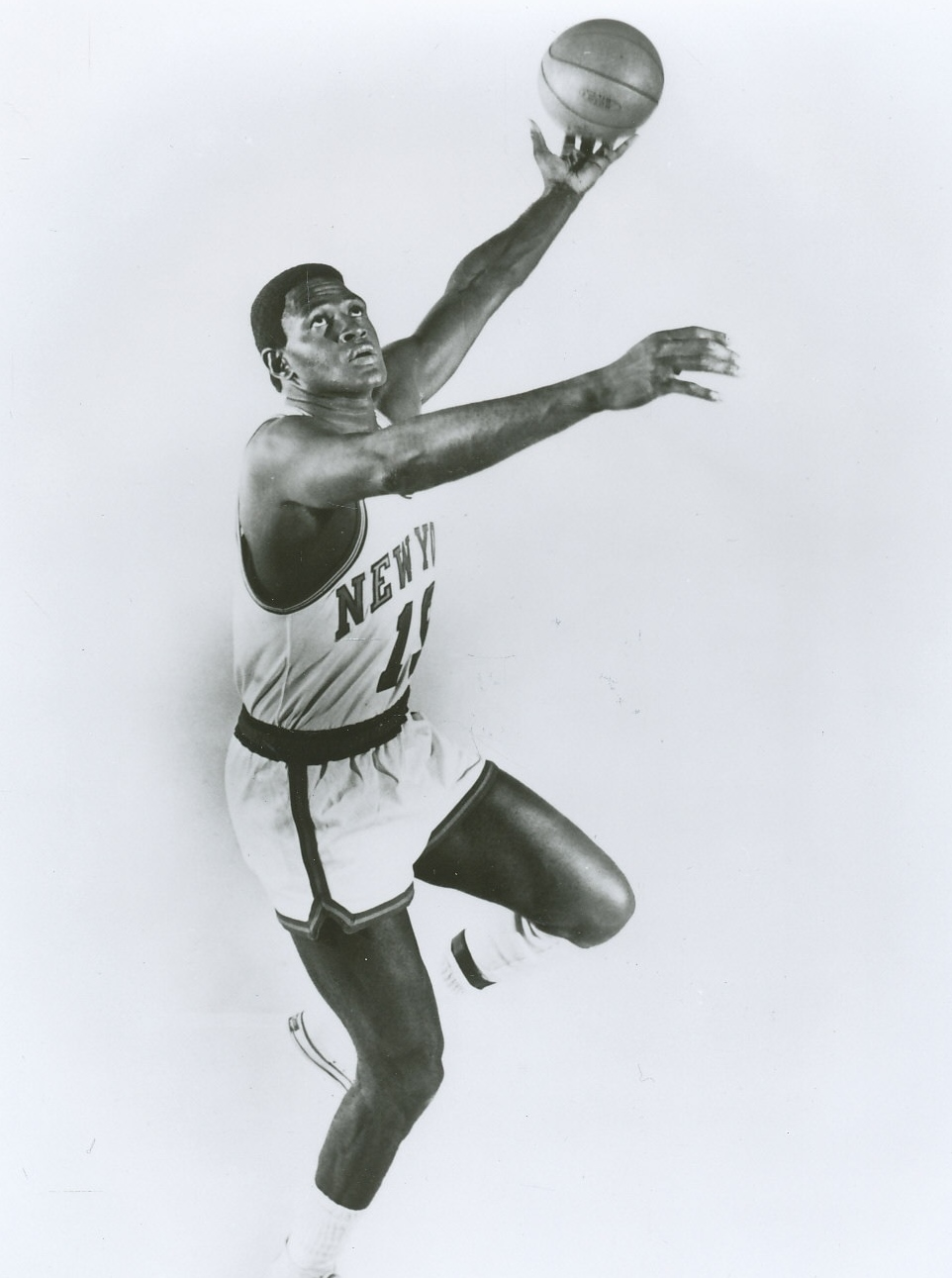
- Reed with the New York Knicks in 1972

Personal information
- Born: June 25, 1942 Hico, Louisiana, U.S.
- Died: March 21, 2023 (aged 80) Houston, Texas, U.S.
- Listed height: 6 ft 10 in (2.08 m)
- Listed weight: 240 lb (109 kg)

Career information
- High school: West Side (Lillie, Louisiana)
- College: Grambling State (1960–1964)
- NBA draft: 1964: 2nd round, 8th overall pick
- Drafted by: New York Knicks
- Playing career: 1964–1974
- Position: Center
- Number: 19
- Coaching career: 1977–1989

Career history

Playing
- 1964–1974: New York Knicks

Career highlights
- 2× NBA champion (1970, 1973); 2× NBA Finals MVP (1970, 1973); NBA Most Valuable Player (1970); 7× NBA All-Star (1965–1971); NBA All-Star Game MVP (1970); All-NBA First Team (1970); 4× All-NBA Second Team (1967–1969, 1971); NBA All-Defensive First Team (1970); NBA Rookie of the Year (1965); NBA All-Rookie Team (1965); NBA anniversary team (50th, 75th); No. 19 retired by New York Knicks

Career NBA statistics
- Points: 12,183 (18.7 ppg)
- Rebounds: 8,414 (12.9 rpg)
- Assists: 1,186 (1.8 apg)
- Stats at NBA.com
- Stats at Basketball Reference
- Basketball Hall of Fame
- Collegiate Basketball Hall of Fame
Medals
Representing United States
Basketball
Pan American Games
Gold medal – first place	1963 São Paulo	Team competition

Willis Reed Jr. (June 25, 1942 – March 21, 2023) was an American professional basketball player, coach, and general manager. He spent his entire ten-year pro playing career (1964–1974) with the New York Knicks of the National Basketball Association (NBA). Reed was a seven-time NBA All-Star and five-time All-NBA selection, including once on the first team in 1970, when he was named the NBA Most Valuable Player (MVP). He was a two-time NBA champion (1970, 1973) and was voted the NBA Finals MVP both times. He is the only 2nd round NBA draft pick to have won the award twice. In 1982, Reed was inducted into the Naismith Memorial Basketball Hall of Fame. He was named to both the NBA's 50th and 75th anniversary teams.

After retiring as a player, Reed served as assistant and head coach with several teams for nearly a decade, then was promoted to general manager and vice president of basketball operations (1989–1996) for the New Jersey Nets. He then became the team's senior vice president of basketball operations, holding the position when the team reached the NBA Finals in 2002 and 2003.

== Early life ==
Born on June 25, 1942, in Hico, Louisiana, Willis Reed Jr. was the only child of Willis Sr. and Inell Reed. Reed was born three weeks before his father joined the Army for the duration of World War II. His parents moved from his grandparents' farm to Bernice, Louisiana, where they worked to ensure Reed got an education in the segregated South.

Reed showed athletic ability at an early age and played basketball at all-black high schools; first Elliott High School in Bernice, where his family lived, and then nine miles away at the new West Side High School in Lillie, Louisiana, which had been built in response to the U.S. Supreme Court decision in Brown v. Board of Education. He played under coach Lendon Smith, and led West Side to two state tournaments and a state championship. In his senior year, it is said that Reed once scored 58 points in a game playing barefoot, after his shoes were stolen.

Reed was All-State in football (as an end) and basketball, and he set a state record in the discus throw. He was recruited by colleges, such as Loyola of Chicago, Nebraska and Wisconsin, for basketball. Reed attended Grambling State University, a historically black college, playing under coach Fred Hobdy. He became a starter as a freshman, the team won the NAIA championship, and he was named to the all-tournament team as a freshman.

Playing for the Grambling State Tigers men's basketball team, Reed scored 2,280 career points, averaging 26.6 points per game and 21.3 rebounds per game during his senior year. He led the Tigers to one NAIA championship and three Southwestern Athletic Conference (SWAC) championships, and a 108–17 record. He averaged 22 points per game in 12 NAIA tournament games. Reed also was a member of Phi Beta Sigma fraternity. He was inducted into the SWAC Hall of Fame in 1994.

Among his basketball teammates were future Pro Football Hall of Fame player Buck Buchanan, and future AFL player Ernie Ladd.

== Professional career ==
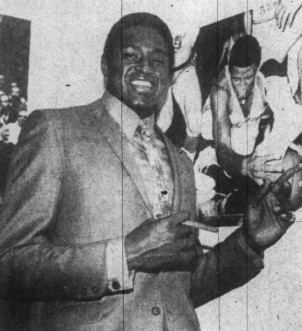
Reed in 1969

=== New York Knicks (1964–1974) ===
The New York Knicks selected Reed with the first pick in the second round of the 1964 NBA draft. Reed quickly made a name for himself as a fierce, dominating, and physical force on both ends of the floor as a center. In March 1965, he scored 46 points against the Los Angeles Lakers, the second-most points in a game ever by the Knicks' rookie. For the 1964–65 season, he was seventh-ranked in the NBA in scoring (19.5 points per game) and fifth-ranked in rebounding (14.7 rebounds per game). He also began one of his multiple All-Star appearances and won the NBA Rookie of the Year Award, while also being named to the NBA All-Rookie First Team.

For a few years, the Knicks struggled while adding valuable players through trades and drafts. Midway through the 1967–68 season, Dick McGuire was replaced as coach with Red Holzman. The Knicks had accumulated a 15–22 record under McGuire but then in the part of the season that Holzman led them achieved a 28–17 record, for a 43–39 season, its first winning record since the 1958–59 season.

Reed continued to be selected annually for the NBA All-Star Game. By that time he was playing as a power forward to open up the center position for Walt Bellamy. Reed averaged 11.6 rebounds in 1965–66 and 14.6 in 1966–67, both ranked top 10-best in the league. He averaged 20.9 points in the latter season.

In 1968–69, the Knicks had traded Bellamy and Howard Komives to the Detroit Pistons for Dave DeBusschere, allowing the Knicks to move Reed back to center. New York's defense surrendered a league-low 105.2 points per game. For five of the next six seasons, the Knicks were the best defensive team in the league, with Reed in the middle and additional defensive efforts by Walt Frazier. Reed scored 21.1 points per game in 1968–69 and grabbed a franchise-record 1,191 rebounds, with an average of 14.5 rebounds per game.

In the 1969–70 season, the Knicks won a franchise-record 60 games and set a then single-season NBA record with an 18-game win streak. In 1970, Reed became the first player in NBA history to be named the NBA All-Star Game MVP, the NBA regular season MVP, and the NBA Finals MVP in the same season. In the same year he was named to the All-NBA First Team and NBA All-Defensive First Team, as well as being named as ABC's Wide World of Sports Athlete of the Year, and the Sporting News NBA MVP. He was the first second round NBA draft pick to win NBA Finals MVP. He was later joined by Dennis Johnson (1976 29th overall, 1979 MVP), Nikola Jokić (2014 41st overall, 2023 MVP) and Jalen Brunson (2018 33rd overall, 2026 MVP).

Reed's most famous performance happened on May 8, 1970, in game seven of the 1970 NBA Finals against the Los Angeles Lakers in Madison Square Garden. Due to a severe thigh injury, a torn muscle that had previously kept him out of game six, he was considered unlikely to play in game seven. However Reed surprised the fans by walking onto the court during warmups, prompting widespread applause. Starting the game, he scored the Knicks' first two field goals on his first two shot attempts, his only points of the game. Reed played 27 minutes, finishing with four points and three rebounds. The Lakers were thrown off by Reed's appearance and the Knicks won 113-99. After the game in the winner's locker room, a moved Howard Cosell told Reed on national television, "You exemplify the very best that the human spirit can offer."

The Knicks slipped to a 52–30 record in the 1970–71 season; despite this, the Knicks took first place in the Atlantic Division. In the middle of the season against the Cincinnati Royals, Reed tied Harry Gallatin's all-time team record of 33 rebounds. He started again in that season's All-Star Game. His season average was 20.9 points and 13.7 rebounds per game, but the Knicks were knocked out by the Baltimore Bullets in the Eastern Conference Finals. During the 1971–72 season, Reed had problems with tendonitis in his left knee, which limited his mobility. After a two-week hiatus, he returned to the court, only to have the injured knee prevent him from playing shortly thereafter; in total, he played 11 games for the season. Without Reed, the Knicks still managed to make the NBA Finals, but were defeated in five games by the Los Angeles Lakers.

The 1972–73 Knicks' season concluded with a 57–25 record, and they proceeded to win another NBA championship. Averaging only 11.0 points in 69 regular season games, Reed's contribution was a far cry from his record two seasons prior. In the playoffs, the Knicks defeated the Bullets and upset the Boston Celtics, and again faced the Lakers in the NBA Finals. After losing the first game, the Knicks won four straight, securing their second NBA championship with a 102–93 victory in game five, as Reed scored 18 points, grabbed 12 rebounds, and recorded seven assists in the deciding victory. After the win, Reed was named NBA Finals MVP.

Reed's career was cut short by injuries, and he retired after the 1973–74 season. For his career Reed averaged 18.7 points and 12.9 rebounds per game, playing 650 games. He played in seven All-Star Games.

== Coaching career ==
Reed spent several years coaching before moving into general management.

=== New York Knicks (1977–1978) ===
He coached the Knicks in 1977–1978, and left the team 14 games into the following season (49–47 record).

=== Creighton (1981–1985) ===
He was the head coach at Creighton University from 1981 to 1985 and volunteer assistant coach for St. John's University.

=== Atlanta Hawks (1985–1987) ===
Reed served as an assistant coach for the Atlanta Hawks from 1985 to 1987.

=== Sacramento Kings (1987–1988) ===
Reed served as an assistant coach for the Sacramento Kings from 1987 to 1988.

=== New Jersey Nets (1988–1989) ===
Reed debuted as head coach of the New Jersey Nets on March 1, 1988, one week after the Nets' star forward (and Reed's cousin) Orlando Woolridge was suspended by the league and was to undergo drug rehabilitation. He compiled a 33–77 record with the Nets.

== Executive career ==
=== New Jersey Nets (1989–2004) ===
In 1989, he stepped down as coach and became the Nets' vice president of basketball and business development. He took over many of the duties held by general manager Harry Weltman following his resignation on May 8, 1990. Later that month, Reed was promoted to senior vice president of basketball operations. He received a three-year contract extension in 1993. During that time, he drafted Kenny Anderson and Derrick Coleman, acquired Dražen Petrović, and made the Nets a playoff contender throughout the early 1990s. Chuck Daly was hired by Reed to coach the Nets for the 1992–93 and 1993–94 seasons.

In 1996, new head coach John Calipari was given control of basketball operations and John Nash was brought on as general manager. Reed remained with the Nets as a senior vice president, but no longer had a role in basketball operations, instead working primarily in marketing.

=== New Orleans Hornets (2004–2007) ===
Reed became the vice president of basketball operations with the New Orleans Hornets in 2004. He retired in 2007.

== Legacy ==
- Reed received the Sam Davis Memorial Award by the Metropolitan Basketball Writers Association as Professional Player of the Year in 1969 and 1970
- In 1970, Reed was inducted into the NAIA Basketball Hall of Fame
- In 1982, Reed was inducted into the Louisiana Sports Hall of Fame
- In 1982, Reed was enshrined in the Naismith Memorial Basketball Hall of Fame
- In 1994, he was inducted into the Southwestern Athletic Conference Hall of Fame
- In 1997, Reed was elected to the NBA 50th Anniversary Team
- In 2021, Reed was elected to the NBA 75th Anniversary Team
- In 2021, Reed was inducted into the Louisiana High School Sports Hall of Fame
- The March 16, 2022, game between Kent State and Southern Utah at The Basketball Classic was designated the Willis Reed Game.
- Starting with the 2021–22 NBA season, the NBA Southwest Division champion would receive the Willis Reed Trophy.

== In popular media ==
Rap songs have mentioned Reed, recognizing his impressive athleticism and skill. Examples include Kurtis Blow's 1984 hit "Basketball" on his Ego Trip album, and the Beastie Boys' "Long Burn The Fire" on their 2011 album Hot Sauce Committee Part Two.

Reed's name has become synonymous with playing through injury, as Cris Collinsworth described an injured Aaron Rodgers as having a "Willis Reed kind of night" on the NBC Sunday Night Football broadcast on September 9, 2018.

== Personal life ==
Reed and his first wife, Geraldine Oliver, married when both were still attending Grambling State University. They had two children, Karl Vance and Veronica Marie, and the marriage ended in divorce. He then married Gale Kennedy, a nurse, in 1983. The wedding was held in Roslyn Heights, New York.

Reed died from heart failure in Houston, Texas, on March 21, 2023, at age 80.

== NBA career statistics ==
Legend
GP	Games played	GS	Games started	MPG	Minutes per game
FG%	Field goal percentage	3P%	3-point field goal percentage	FT%	Free throw percentage
RPG	Rebounds per game	APG	Assists per game	SPG	Steals per game
BPG	Blocks per game	PPG	Points per game	**Bold**	Career high
†	Won an NBA championship	*	Led the league

=== Regular season ===
Year	Team	GP	GS	MPG	FG%	3P%	FT%	RPG	APG	SPG	BPG	PPG
1964–65	New York	80*	—	38.0	.432	—	.742	**14.7**	1.7	—	—	19.5
1965–66	New York	76	—	33.4	.434	—	.757	11.6	1.2	—	—	15.5
1966–67	New York	78	—	36.2	.489	—	.735	14.6	1.6	—	—	20.9
1967–68	New York	81	—	35.5	.490	—	.721	13.2	2.0	—	—	20.8
1968–69	New York	**82**	—	37.9	**.521**	—	.747	14.5	**2.3**	—	—	21.1
1969–70†	New York	81	—	38.1	.507	—	.756	13.9	2.0	—	—	**21.7**
1970–71	New York	73	—	**39.1**	.462	—	.785	13.7	2.0	—	—	20.9
1971–72	New York	11	—	33.0	.438	—	.692	8.7	2.0	—	—	13.4
1972–73†	New York	69	—	27.2	.474	—	.742	8.6	1.8	—	—	11.0
1973–74	New York	19	—	26.3	.457	—	**.792**	7.4	1.6	.6	1.1	11.1
Career		650	—	35.5	.476	—	.747	12.9	1.8	.6	1.1	18.7
All-Star		7	4	23.0	.452	—	.750	8.3	1.0	—	—	12.6

=== Playoffs ===
Year	Team	GP	GS	MPG	FG%	3P%	FT%	RPG	APG	SPG	BPG	PPG
1967	New York	4	—	37.0	.538	—	**.960**	13.8	1.8	—	—	**27.5**
1968	New York	6	—	35.0	**.541**	—	.733	10.3	1.8	—	—	21.3
1969	New York	10	—	**42.9**	.510	—	.786	**14.1**	1.9	—	—	25.7
1970†	New York	**18**	—	40.7	.471	—	.737	13.8	**2.8**	—	—	23.7
1971	New York	12	—	42.0	.413	—	.667	12.0	2.3	—	—	15.7
1973†	New York	17	—	28.6	.466	—	.857	7.6	1.8	—	—	12.8
1974	New York	11	—	12.0	.378	—	.600	2.0	.4	.2	.0	3.4
Career		78	—	33.9	.474	—	.765	10.3	1.9	.2	.0	17.4

== Head coaching record ==
Legend
Regular season	G	Games coached	W	Games won	L	Games lost	W–L %	Win–loss %
Playoffs	PG	Playoff games	PW	Playoff wins	PL	Playoff losses	PW–L %	Playoff win–loss %

=== NBA ===
Team	Year	G	W	L	W–L%	Finish	PG	PW	PL	PW–L%	Result
New York	1977–78	82	43	39	.524	2nd in Atlantic	6	2	4	.333	Lost in Eastern Conference Semifinals
New York	1978–79	14	6	8	.429	(fired)	—	—	—	—	-
New Jersey	1987–88	28	7	21	.250	5th in Atlantic	—	—	—	—	Missed Playoffs
New Jersey	1988–89	82	26	56	.317	4th in Atlantic	—	—	—	—	Missed Playoffs
Career		206	82	124	.398		6	2	4	.333	
