= Bill Hosket Jr. =

American basketball player (born 1946)

Bill Hosket
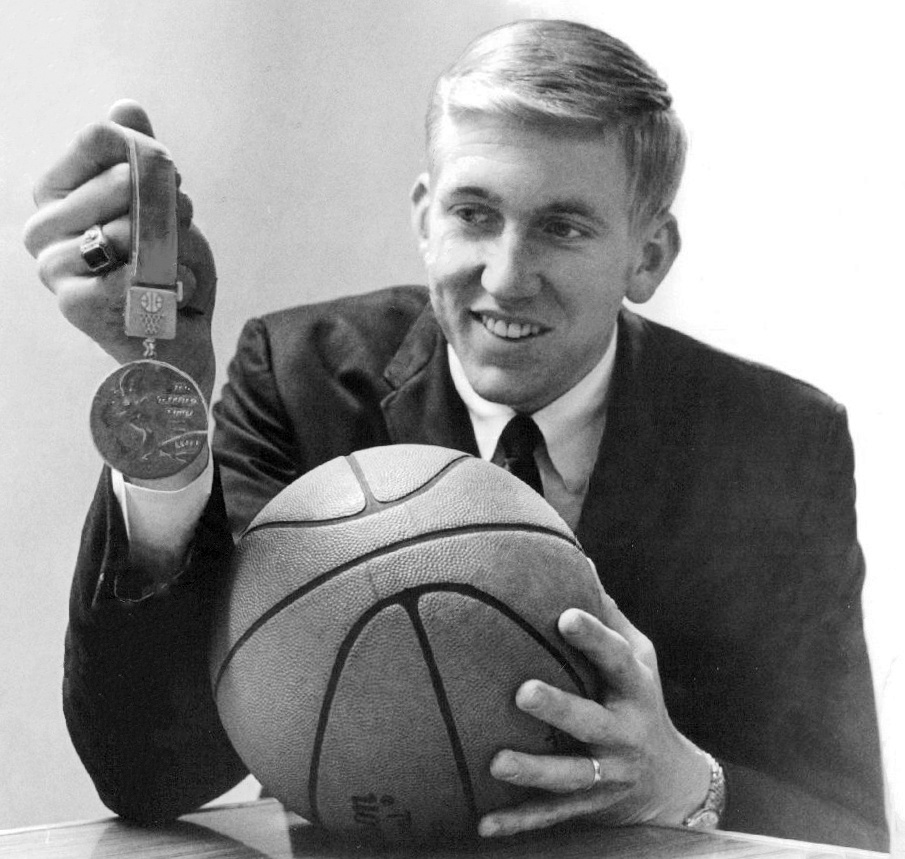
- Hosket in 1969

Personal information
- Born: December 20, 1946 (age 79) Dayton, Ohio, U.S.
- Listed height: 6 ft 7 in (2.01 m)
- Listed weight: 225 lb (102 kg)

Career information
- High school: Belmont (Dayton, Ohio)
- College: Ohio State (1965–1968)
- NBA draft: 1968: 1st round, 10th overall pick
- Drafted by: New York Knicks
- Playing career: 1968–1972
- Position: Power forward / center
- Number: 20, 25

Career history
- 1968–1970: New York Knicks
- 1970–1972: Buffalo Braves

Career highlights
- NBA champion (1970); 2× First-team All-Big Ten (1967, 1968); Fourth-team Parade All-American (1964)

Career NBA statistics
- Points: 573 (4.0 ppg)
- Rebounds: 355 (2.5 rpg)
- Assists: 94 (0.7 apg)
- Stats at NBA.com
- Stats at Basketball Reference
Medals
Men's basketball
Representing United States
Olympic Games
Gold medal – first place	1968 Mexico City	Team competition

Wilmer Frederick Hosket (born December 20, 1946) is an American former professional basketball player. He played five seasons in the National Basketball Association (NBA) and played college basketball for the Ohio State Buckeyes.

A 6′8″ power forward/center, Hosket played basketball at Belmont High School in Dayton, Ohio, where he played alongside another future college All-American and NBA player, Don May. The two once combined for 88 points in one game (50 by Hosket, 38 by May). Belmont captured the 1964 Ohio state championship with ease, winning the state semifinal and final by 24 and 29 points, respectively. Coached by John Ross, the Bison went 26-1 (with the loss in overtime after both May and Hosket fouled out) and May and Hosket were the first teammates ever to be named first-team All-Ohio. He was named Ohio Player of the Year and was also MVP of the state tournament.

He played college basketball at the Ohio State University from 1965 to 1968. He led his Ohio State team in scoring and rebounding during each of his three varsity seasons and was named to three All Big Ten Conference Academic First Teams. In fall 1968, he competed at the Summer Olympics, winning a gold medal with the United States national basketball team.

Hosket then played four seasons (1968–1972) in the National Basketball Association as a member of the Buffalo Braves and New York Knicks. He averaged 4.0 points per game in his career and won a league championship with the Knicks in 1970. His high school teammate, Don May, was also on the team.

After retiring as a player, Hosket served on three United States Olympic Basketball Committees. He also founded Buckeye Basketball Camp (not officially affiliated with Ohio State University) in his home state of Ohio.

In 1998, Hosket was named as the President of the OHSAA Foundation and served as the foundation's first executive director. He is a principal at Hosket & Ulen, an independent insurance agency. Hosket and his wife, Patty, have three grown sons (all graduates of Ohio State) and reside in Columbus.

Hosket's father, Bill Hosket, Sr., and his son, Brad Hosket, also played basketball at Ohio State.

Hosket is a member of the Ohio State Hall of Fame and was named in 1993 to the National Association of Basketball Coaches Silver Anniversary team. He was honored in 2002 by the Ohio High School Athletic Association with its highest honor – the Ethics and Integrity Award. In 2006, he was inducted into the Ohio Basketball Hall of Fame.

== Career statistics ==
Legend
GP	Games played	GS	Games started	MPG	Minutes per game
FG%	Field goal percentage	3P%	3-point field goal percentage	FT%	Free throw percentage
RPG	Rebounds per game	APG	Assists per game	SPG	Steals per game
BPG	Blocks per game	PPG	Points per game	**Bold**	Career high
†	Won an NBA championship

=== NBA/ABA ===
==== Regular season ====
Year	Team	GP	GS	MPG	FG%	FT%	RPG	APG	PPG
1968–69	New York	50	0	7.0	.431	.571	1.9	.4	2.6
1969–70†	New York	36	0	6.5	.505	.788	1.8	.5	3.3
1970–71	Buffalo	13		**16.7**	**.522**	.647	**5.8**	**1.5**	**8.1**
1971–72	Buffalo	44		13.5	.492	**.808**	2.8	.9	5.0
Career		143	0	9.8	.485	.715	2.5	.7	4.0

==== Playoffs ====
Year	Team	GP	GS	MPG	FG%	FT%	RPG	APG	PPG
1969	New York	4	0	5.5	**.500**	.000	**1.8**	**.5**	1.5
1970†	New York	**5**	**1**	**5.8**	.400	**.750**	1.0	.4	**2.2**
Career		9	1	5.7	.438	.600	1.3	.4	1.9
