= 1970 NBA Finals =

1970 basketball championship series

Team	Coach	Wins
New York Knicks	Red Holzman	4
Los Angeles Lakers	Joe Mullaney	3
- Dates: April 24 – May 8
- MVP: Willis Reed (New York Knicks)
- Hall of Famers: Knicks: Willis Reed (1982); Bill Bradley (1983); Dave DeBusschere (1983); Walt Frazier (1987); Phil Jackson (2007, coach); Dick Barnett (2024); Lakers: Elgin Baylor (1977); Wilt Chamberlain (1979); Jerry West (1980); Coaches: Red Holzman (1986); Officials: Mendy Rudolph (2007)
- Eastern finals: Knicks defeated Bucks, 4–1
- Western finals: Lakers defeated Hawks, 4–0

The 1970 NBA World Championship Series was the championship series of the 1970 NBA playoffs, which concluded the 1969–70 National Basketball Association (NBA) season. The Eastern Division champion New York Knicks defeated the Western Division champion Los Angeles Lakers in seven games for their first NBA title in franchise history.

The Knicks appeared to have a see-saw Game 3 won when Dave DeBusschere made a shot with three seconds left to give New York a 102–100 edge and the Lakers were stuck with no time outs. L.A. inbounded to Mr. Clutch, Jerry West, who launched and made a miracle shot from beyond midcourt. It counted only for two points, as only the ABA had a three-point shot at the time, so the game went to overtime, and the Knicks were able to win, 111–108.

The final game of the series was named by ESPN in 2010 as the greatest Game 7 in Finals history, featuring a return from injury for Willis Reed. Reed's most famous performance took place on May 8, 1970, in Game 7 played at Madison Square Garden. Due to a severe thigh injury suffered in Game 5, a torn muscle that kept him out of Game 6, he was considered unlikely to play in Game 7. Yet Reed surprised the fans by walking onto the court during warmups, prompting widespread applause. Starting the game, he scored the Knicks' first two field goals on his first two shot attempts, his only points of the game. He then played defense on Wilt Chamberlain, limiting him to two shots made in nine attempts. When Reed left for good with 3:05 left in the first half, the Knicks led 61–37. Walt "Clyde" Frazier took it from there, finishing with 36 points and 19 assists as the Knicks won the championship, 113–99. Following the game in the winner's locker room, a moved Howard Cosell told Reed on national television, "You exemplify the very best that the human spirit can offer." ESPN's SportsCentury Top 10 Games of the 20th Century ranked Game 7 the 9th Greatest Game in 1999.

As of 2026, this remains the only time in which the Knicks won the championship at home.

== Background ==
=== New York Knicks ===
1969–70 New York Knicks roster
Players

Pos.	No.	Player	Height	Weight	DOB	From
SG	12	Dick Barnett	6 ft 4 in (1.93 m)	190 lb (86 kg)	1936–10–02	Tennessee State
C	17	Nate Bowman	6 ft 10 in (2.08 m)	230 lb (104 kg)	1945–03–19	Wichita State
SF	24	Bill Bradley	6 ft 5 in (1.96 m)	205 lb (93 kg)	1943–07–28	Princeton
PF	22	Dave DeBusschere	6 ft 6 in (1.98 m)	220 lb (100 kg)	1940–10–16	Detroit Mercy
PG	10	Walt Frazier	6 ft 4 in (1.93 m)	200 lb (91 kg)	1945–03–29	Southern Illinois
PF	20	Bill Hosket, Jr.	6 ft 8 in (2.03 m)	225 lb (102 kg)	1946–12–20	Ohio State
PF	18	Phil Jackson (IN)	6 ft 8 in (2.03 m)	220 lb (100 kg)	1945-09-17	North Dakota
SF	5	Don May	6 ft 4 in (1.93 m)	200 lb (91 kg)	1946–01–03	Dayton
C	19	Willis Reed	6 ft 9 in (2.06 m)	235 lb (107 kg)	1942–06–25	Grambling State
SG	6	Mike Riordan	6 ft 4 in (1.93 m)	200 lb (91 kg)	1945–07–09	Providence
SF	33	Cazzie Russell	6 ft 5 in (1.96 m)	218 lb (99 kg)	1944–06–07	Michigan
SF	9	Dave Stallworth	6 ft 7 in (2.01 m)	200 lb (91 kg)	1941–12–20	Wichita State
SG	16	John Warren	6 ft 3 in (1.91 m)	180 lb (82 kg)	1947–07–07	St. John's

Coaches
Head coach
- Red Holzman

Legend
- (DP) Unsigned draft pick
- (FA) Free agent
- (S) Suspended
- Injured

=== Los Angeles Lakers ===
1969–70 Los Angeles Lakers roster
Players

Pos.	No.	Player	Height	Weight	DOB	From
SF	22	Elgin Baylor	6 ft 5 in (1.96 m)	225 lb (102 kg)	1934-09-16	Seattle
C	13	Wilt Chamberlain	7 ft 1 in (2.16 m)	275 lb (125 kg)	1936-08-21	Kansas
C	31	Mel Counts	7 ft 0 in (2.13 m)	230 lb (104 kg)	1941-10-16	Oregon State
PG	21	Johnny Egan	5 ft 11 in (1.80 m)	180 lb (82 kg)	1939-01-31	Providence
SF	24	Keith Erickson	6 ft 5 in (1.96 m)	195 lb (88 kg)	1944-04-19	UCLA
SG	20	Dick Garrett	6 ft 3 in (1.91 m)	185 lb (84 kg)	1947-01-31	Southern Illinois
PF	52	Happy Hairston	6 ft 7 in (2.01 m)	225 lb (102 kg)	1942-05-31	NYU
PF	30	Bill Hewitt	6 ft 7 in (2.01 m)	210 lb (95 kg)	1944-08-08	USC
SF	33	Mike Lynn	6 ft 7 in (2.01 m)	215 lb (98 kg)	1945-11-25	UCLA
SG	15	Willie McCarter	6 ft 3 in (1.91 m)	175 lb (79 kg)	1946-07-26	Drake
C	35	Rick Roberson	6 ft 9 in (2.06 m)	231 lb (105 kg)	1947-07-07	Cincinnati
PF	14	John Tresvant	6 ft 7 in (2.01 m)	215 lb (98 kg)	1939-11-06	Seattle
PG	44	Jerry West	6 ft 3 in (1.91 m)	175 lb (79 kg)	1938-05-28	West Virginia

Coaches
Head coach
- Joe Mullaney

Legend
- (DP) Unsigned draft pick
- (FA) Free agent
- (S) Suspended
- Injured

== Series summary ==
Game	Date	Road team	Result	Home team
Game 1	April 24	Los Angeles Lakers	112–124 (0–1)	New York Knicks
Game 2	April 27	Los Angeles Lakers	105–103 (1–1)	New York Knicks
Game 3	April 29	New York Knicks	112–108 (OT) (2–1)	Los Angeles Lakers
Game 4	May 1	New York Knicks	115–121 (OT) (2–2)	Los Angeles Lakers
Game 5	May 4	Los Angeles Lakers	100–107 (2–3)	New York Knicks
Game 6	May 6	New York Knicks	113–135 (3–3)	Los Angeles Lakers
Game 7	May 8	Los Angeles Lakers	99–113 (3–4)	New York Knicks

Knicks win series 4–3

== Game summaries ==
=== Game 1 ===
April 24

Boxscore

Los Angeles Lakers 112, New York Knicks 124
Scoring by quarter: 25–35, 29–30, 38–24, 20–35
Pts: Jerry West 33; Rebs: Wilt Chamberlain 24; Asts: Wilt Chamberlain 5	Pts: Willis Reed 37; Rebs: Reed, DeBusschere 16 each Asts: Dick Barnett 9
New York leads series, 1–0

Madison Square Garden, New York City, New York
Attendance: 19,500

=== Game 2 ===
April 27

Boxscore

Los Angeles Lakers 105, New York Knicks 103
Scoring by quarter: 28–24, 24–28, 29–29, 24–22
Pts: Jerry West 34; Rebs: Wilt Chamberlain 24; Asts: Garrett, Erickson 6 each	Pts: Willis Reed 29; Rebs: Willis Reed 15; Asts: Walt Frazier 11
Series tied, 1–1

Madison Square Garden, New York City, New York
Attendance: 19,500

=== Game 3 ===
April 29

Boxscore

New York Knicks 111, Los Angeles Lakers 108 (OT)
Scoring by quarter: 20–26, 22–30, 26–17, 34–29, Overtime: 9–6
Pts: Willis Reed 38; Rebs: Willis Reed 17; Asts: Walt Frazier 7	Pts: Jerry West 34; Rebs: Wilt Chamberlain 26; Asts: Elgin Baylor 11
New York leads series, 2–1

The Forum, Inglewood, California
Attendance: 17,509

- Jerry West hit a desperation buzzer-beating 60-foot shot to tie it at 102 and force OT. If a three-point line had existed at the time, it would've won the game for the Lakers and potentially the Finals, likely going down as the greatest shot in NBA history.

=== Game 4 ===
May 1

Boxscore

New York Knicks 115, Los Angeles Lakers 121 (OT)
Scoring by quarter: 27–24, 20–30, 20–17, 32–28, Overtime: 16–22
Pts: Dick Barnett 29; Rebs: Dave Stallworth 13; Asts: Walt Frazier 11	Pts: Jerry West 37; Rebs: Wilt Chamberlain 25; Asts: Jerry West 18
Series tied, 2–2

The Forum, Inglewood, California
Attendance: 17,509

=== Game 5 ===
May 4

Boxscore

Los Angeles Lakers 100, New York Knicks 107
Scoring by quarter: 30–20, 23–20, 29–35, 18–32
Pts: Wilt Chamberlain 22; Rebs: Wilt Chamberlain 19; Asts: Keith Erickson 6	Pts: Walt Frazier 21; Rebs: Cazzie Russell 8 Asts: Walt Frazier 12
New York leads series, 3–2

Madison Square Garden, New York City, New York
Attendance: 19,500

=== Game 6 ===
May 6

Boxscore

New York Knicks 113, Los Angeles Lakers 135
Scoring by quarter: 16–36, 35–35, 29–28, 33–36
Pts: Dave DeBusschere 25; Rebs: Dave DeBusschere 9 Asts: Dick Barnett 8	Pts: Wilt Chamberlain 45; Rebs: Wilt Chamberlain 27; Asts: Jerry West 13
Series tied, 3–3

The Forum, Inglewood, California
Attendance: 17,509

=== Game 7 ===
May 8

Boxscore

Los Angeles Lakers 99, New York Knicks 113
Scoring by quarter: 24–38, 18–31, 27–25, 30–19
Pts: Jerry West 28; Rebs: Wilt Chamberlain 24; Asts: Keith Erickson 6	Pts: Walt Frazier 36; Rebs: Dave DeBusschere 17; Asts: Walt Frazier 19
New York wins series, 4–3

Madison Square Garden, New York City, New York
Attendance: 19,500
Referees:
- No. 5 Mendy Rudolph
- No. 26 Richie Powers

External videos
- Full game broadcast on YouTube

During the pre-game segment with Chris Schenkel, Jack Twyman noticed Knicks' injured center Willis Reed (whose status for the clincher had been doubtful) advancing from the tunnel toward the court. Twyman then exclaimed: "I think we see Willis coming out!" The sight of Reed marching toward the basketball floor helped inspire the Knicks to a 113–99 victory – one that gave New York its first NBA league title.

Walt "Clyde" Frazier went on to post one of the greatest performances in NBA playoff history, tallying 36 points, seven rebounds, 19 assists, and six steals in leading New York to victory.

== Television ==
The 1970 NBA Finals were the first to be nationally televised in full, with ABC providing the coverage. Chris Schenkel was the play-by-play man, with Jack Twyman serving as the color analyst. Howard Cosell provided interviews from the Knicks' locker room following Game 7 and was famously doused with champagne.

However, the Knicks' victory in Game 7 was not seen live on broadcast TV in New York; ABC's coverage was blacked out on WABC-TV, causing a raft of angry fans to deluge the WABC switchboard. Schenkel made an announcement during the broadcast that the game would be aired in New York at 11:30 p.m. that night. The game was shown live on the premium-channel MSG Network in New York City, which was then only available in about 25,000 cable households in Manhattan.

Since the 1970 finals, every NBA Finals game has been carried across the United States, though local blackouts would take some time to subside.

== Player statistics ==
Legend
GP	Games played	GS	Games started	MPG	Minutes per game
FG%	Field-goal percentage	3P%	3-point field-goal percentage	FT%	Free-throw percentage
RPG	Rebounds per game	APG	Assists per game	SPG	Steals per game
BPG	Blocks per game	PPG	Points per game

New York Knicks

New York Knicks statistics
Player	GP	GS	MPG	FG%	3P%	FT%	RPG	APG	SPG	BPG	PPG
Willis Reed	6		37.7	.484		.588	10.5	2.8			23.0
Dave DeBusschere	7		38.1	.455		.722	12.6	2.6			19.0
Dick Barnett	7		40.6	.448		.897	2.3	4.3			18.6
Walt Frazier	7		43.1	.541		.775	7.7	10.4			17.6
Bill Bradley	7		35.6	.388		.750	4.0	2.7			12.1
Cazzie Russell	7		18.6	.492		1.000	3.6	1.4			9.3
Dave Stallworth	7		14.0	.447		1.000	4.7	1.6			7.0
Mike Riordan	7		13.0	.387		.857	1.9	1.4			4.3
Nate Bowman	7		9.7	.481		.600	3.0	0.3			4.1
Bill Hosket	2		4.5	.250			0.5	0.5			1.0
John Warren	4		1.5	1.000			0.0	0.3			0.5

Los Angeles Lakers

Los Angeles Lakers statistics
Player	GP	GS	MPG	FG%	3P%	FT%	RPG	APG	SPG	BPG	PPG
Jerry West	7		47.9	.450		.833	3.4	7.7			31.3
Wilt Chamberlain	7		47.6	.625		.343	24.1	4.0			23.3
Elgin Baylor	7		40.0	.486		.778	11.3	4.7			17.9
Dick Garrett	7		36.7	.474		.944	3.0	2.1			13.0
Keith Erickson	7		38.7	.479		.722	4.4	4.7			11.6
Happy Hairston	6		17.5	.471		.636	4.3	1.5			6.5
Johnny Egan	7		10.3	.526		1.000	0.1	0.9			3.6
John Tresvant	4		9.3	.333		.800	2.8	1.3			4.5
Mel Counts	3		9.0	.357		.667	2.7	0.3			4.0
Rick Roberson	3		3.3	.500		.500	1.3	0.0			2.3
Mike Lynn	1		1.0				0.0	0.0			0.0
Willie McCarter	1		2.0	.000			1.0	1.0			0.0
