= 1970 NBA playoffs =

Postseason tournament

Tournament details
- Dates: March 25–May 8, 1970
- Season: 1969–70
- Teams: 8

Final positions
- Champions: New York Knicks (1st title)
- Runners-up: Los Angeles Lakers
- Semifinalists: Atlanta Hawks; Milwaukee Bucks

Tournament statistics
- Scoring leader(s): Jerry West (Lakers) (31.2 PPG)

Awards
- MVP: Willis Reed (Knicks)

The 1970 NBA playoffs was the postseason tournament of the National Basketball Association's 1969–70 season. The tournament concluded with the Eastern Division champion New York Knicks defeating the Western Division champion Los Angeles Lakers 4 games to 3 in the NBA Finals. Willis Reed was named NBA Finals MVP.

It was the first NBA title for the Knicks in franchise history, and was their first appearance in the finals since losing their third straight finals in 1953 to the Lakers while they were still in Minneapolis, Minnesota.

For the Lakers, it was their third straight Western Division title and second straight year they lost in Game 7 of the NBA finals. The Lakers dropped their eighth straight NBA finals series (the previous 7 to the Boston Celtics) and were denied their first NBA title since 1954.

It was also the playoff debut of both the second-year Milwaukee Bucks and Phoenix Suns, with the former managing a first-round defeat of the Philadelphia 76ers.

Boston missed the playoffs for the first time since 1951, despite being the defending champions.

== Bracket ==
Division Semifinals
E1	New York*	4
E3	Baltimore	3
Eastern Division
E4	Philadelphia	1
E2	Milwaukee	4
W1	Atlanta*	4
W3	Chicago	1
Western Division
W4	Phoenix	3
W2	Los Angeles	4

Division Finals
E1	New York*	4
E2	Milwaukee	1
W1	Atlanta*	0
W2	Los Angeles	4

NBA Finals
E1	New York*	4
W2	Los Angeles	3

- * Division winner
- Bold Series winner
- Italic Team with home-court advantage in NBA Finals

== Division Semifinals ==
=== Eastern Division Semifinals ===
==== (1) New York Knicks vs. (3) Baltimore Bullets ====
March 26

Boxscore

Baltimore Bullets 117, New York Knicks 120 (2OT)
Scoring by quarter: 22–23, 30–23, 23–32, 27–24, Overtime: 8–8, 7–10
Pts: Earl Monroe 39; Rebs: Wes Unseld 31; Asts: Wes Unseld 5	Pts: Willis Reed 30; Rebs: Dave DeBusschere 24; Asts: Walt Frazier 8
New York leads series, 1–0

Madison Square Garden, New York City, New York
Attendance: 19,500

March 27

Boxscore

New York Knicks 106, Baltimore Bullets 99
Scoring by quarter: 26–26, 22–25, 29–32, 29–16
Pts: Willis Reed 27; Rebs: Willis Reed 17; Asts: Frazier, Barnett 6 each	Pts: Gus Johnson 28; Rebs: Wes Unseld 21; Asts: Fred Carter 7
New York leads series, 2–0

Baltimore Civic Center, Baltimore, Maryland
Attendance: 12,289

March 29

Boxscore

Baltimore Bullets 127, New York Knicks 113
Scoring by quarter: 27–30, 36–34, 32–21, 32–28
Pts: Earl Monroe 25; Rebs: Wes Unseld 34; Asts: Earl Monroe 5	Pts: Walt Frazier 24; Rebs: Dave DeBusschere 10; Asts: Walt Frazier 5
New York leads series, 2–1

Madison Square Garden, New York City, New York
Attendance: 19,500

March 31

Boxscore

New York Knicks 92, Baltimore Bullets 102
Scoring by quarter: 21–26, 25–27, 21–24, 25–25
Pts: Walt Frazier 25; Rebs: Willis Reed 15; Asts: Walt Frazier 7	Pts: Earl Monroe 34; Rebs: Wes Unseld 24; Asts: Fred Carter 7
Series tied, 2–2

Baltimore Civic Center, Baltimore, Maryland
Attendance: 12,289

April 2

Boxscore

Baltimore Bullets 80, New York Knicks 101
Scoring by quarter: 27–31, 22–23, 20–22, 11–25
Pts: Jack Marin 19; Rebs: Wes Unseld 15; Asts: Jack Marin 6	Pts: Willis Reed 36; Rebs: Willis Reed 36; Asts: Walt Frazier 6
New York leads series, 3–2

Madison Square Garden, New York City, New York
Attendance: 19,500

April 5

Boxscore

New York Knicks 87, Baltimore Bullets 96
Scoring by quarter: 18–15, 25–26, 23–30, 21–25
Pts: Walt Frazier 18; Rebs: Willis Reed 16; Asts: Walt Frazier 5	Pts: Gus Johnson 31; Rebs: Wes Unseld 24; Asts: Earl Monroe 5
Series tied, 3–3

Baltimore Civic Center, Baltimore, Maryland
Attendance: 12,289

April 6

Boxscore

Baltimore Bullets 114, New York Knicks 127
Scoring by quarter: 23–28, 24–34, 35–26, 32–39
Pts: Earl Monroe 32; Rebs: Wes Unseld 16; Asts: Earl Monroe 6	Pts: DeBusschere, Barnett 28 each Rebs: Willis Reed 14; Asts: Walt Frazier 8
New York wins series, 4–3

Madison Square Garden, New York City, New York
Attendance: 19,500

This was the second playoff meeting between these two teams, with the Knicks winning the first meeting.

Previous playoff series
New York leads 1–0 in all-time playoff series

1969

Baltimore Bullets 0, New York Knicks 4

1969 Eastern Division Semifinals

==== (2) Milwaukee Bucks vs. (4) Philadelphia 76ers ====
March 25

Boxscore

Philadelphia 76ers 118, Milwaukee Bucks 125
Scoring by quarter: 27–28, 30–27, 26–29, 35–41
Pts: Clark, B. Cunningham 21 each Rebs: Jim Washington 9 Asts: Greer, Jones 7 each	Pts: Kareem Abdul-Jabbar 36; Rebs: Kareem Abdul-Jabbar 20; Asts: Bob Dandridge 6
Milwaukee leads series, 1–0

University of Wisconsin Field House, Madison, Wisconsin
Attendance: 9,686

March 27

Boxscore

Philadelphia 76ers 112, Milwaukee Bucks 105
Scoring by quarter: 32–23, 31–34, 23–20, 26–28
Pts: Billy Cunningham 37; Rebs: B. Cunningham, Washington 10 each Asts: Billy Cunningham 7	Pts: Kareem Abdul-Jabbar 33; Rebs: Bob Dandridge 12; Asts: Bob Dandridge 7
Series tied, 1–1

University of Wisconsin Field House, Madison, Wisconsin
Attendance: 9,686

March 30

Boxscore

Milwaukee Bucks 156, Philadelphia 76ers 120
Scoring by quarter: 40–14, 37–27, 47–31, 32–48
Pts: Kareem Abdul-Jabbar 33; Rebs: Kareem Abdul-Jabbar 17; Asts: Flynn Robinson 14	Pts: Archie Clark 20; Rebs: Jim Washington 11; Asts: Bud Ogden 6
Milwaukee leads series, 2–1

Spectrum, Philadelphia, Pennsylvania
Attendance: 15,244

April 1

Boxscore

Milwaukee Bucks 118, Philadelphia 76ers 111
Scoring by quarter: 35–24, 25–32, 26–27, 32–28
Pts: Kareem Abdul-Jabbar 33; Rebs: Greg Smith 19; Asts: Bob Dandridge 7	Pts: Billy Cunningham 50; Rebs: Darrall Imhoff 16; Asts: Wali Jones 7
Milwaukee leads series, 3–1

Spectrum, Philadelphia, Pennsylvania
Attendance: 14,206

April 3

Boxscore

Philadelphia 76ers 106, Milwaukee Bucks 115
Scoring by quarter: 28–28, 33–24, 24–30, 21–33
Pts: Billy Cunningham 28; Rebs: Billy Cunningham 18; Asts: Hal Greer 6	Pts: Kareem Abdul-Jabbar 46; Rebs: Kareem Abdul-Jabbar 25; Asts: Bob Dandridge 8
Milwaukee wins series, 4–1

University of Wisconsin Field House, Madison, Wisconsin
Attendance: 12,868

This was the first playoff meeting between these two teams.

=== Western Division Semifinals ===
==== (1) Atlanta Hawks vs. (3) Chicago Bulls ====
March 25

Boxscore

Chicago Bulls 111, Atlanta Hawks 129
Scoring by quarter: 27–34, 33–30, 23–33, 28–32
Pts: Chet Walker 17; Rebs: Tom Boerwinkle 11; Asts: Haskins, Weiss 6 each	Pts: Joe Caldwell 39; Rebs: Bill Bridges 15; Asts: Walt Hazzard 10
Atlanta leads series, 1–0

Alexander Memorial Coliseum, Atlanta, Georgia
Attendance: 6,427

March 28

Boxscore

Chicago Bulls 104, Atlanta Hawks 124
Scoring by quarter: 25–38, 23–23, 25–40, 31–23
Pts: Tom Boerwinkle 23; Rebs: Tom Boerwinkle 12; Asts: Boerwinkle, Weiss 4 each	Pts: Joe Caldwell 23; Rebs: Walt Bellamy 14; Asts: Walt Hazzard 13
Atlanta leads series, 2–0

Alexander Memorial Coliseum, Atlanta, Georgia
Attendance: 7,195

March 31

Boxscore

Atlanta Hawks 106, Chicago Bulls 101
Scoring by quarter: 29–17, 22–37, 25–24, 30–23
Pts: Lou Hudson 30; Rebs: Walt Bellamy 17; Asts: Walt Hazzard 8	Pts: Shaler Halimon 22; Rebs: Tom Boerwinkle 18; Asts: Shaler Halimon 6
Atlanta leads series, 3–0

Chicago Stadium, Chicago, Illinois
Attendance: 8,898

April 3

Boxscore

Atlanta Hawks 120, Chicago Bulls 131
Scoring by quarter: 25–32, 28–25, 35–42, 32–32
Pts: Joe Caldwell 38; Rebs: Bill Bridges 25; Asts: Walt Hazzard 9	Pts: Chet Walker 39; Rebs: Sloan, Boerwinkle 12 each Asts: Clem Haskins 13
Atlanta leads series, 3–1

Chicago Stadium, Chicago, Illinois
Attendance: 7,584

April 5

Boxscore

Chicago Bulls 107, Atlanta Hawks 113
Scoring by quarter: 25–20, 26–31, 22–34, 34–28
Pts: Clem Haskins 22; Rebs: Tom Boerwinkle 19; Asts: Clem Haskins 6	Pts: Joe Caldwell 24; Rebs: Walt Bellamy 23; Asts: Bill Bridges 4
Atlanta wins series, 4–1

Alexander Memorial Coliseum, Atlanta, Georgia
Attendance: 4,966

This was the second playoff meeting between these two teams, with the Hawks winning the first meeting while based in St. Louis.

Previous playoff series
Atlanta/ St. Louis leads 1–0 in all-time playoff series

1967

St. Louis Hawks 3, Chicago Bulls 0

1967 Western Division Semifinals

==== (2) Los Angeles Lakers vs. (4) Phoenix Suns ====
March 25

Boxscore

Phoenix Suns 112, Los Angeles Lakers 128
Scoring by quarter: 33–25, 24–36, 25–33, 30–34
Pts: Paul Silas 26; Rebs: Paul Silas 18; Asts: Connie Hawkins 6	Pts: Elgin Baylor 32; Rebs: Wilt Chamberlain 19; Asts: Elgin Baylor 10
Los Angeles leads series, 1–0

The Forum, Inglewood, California
Attendance: 15,046

March 29

Boxscore

Phoenix Suns 114, Los Angeles Lakers 101
Scoring by quarter: 22–26, 25–21, 34–32, 33–22
Pts: Connie Hawkins 34; Rebs: Connie Hawkins 20; Asts: Hawkins, Van Arsdale 7 each	Pts: Jerry West 33; Rebs: Wilt Chamberlain 25; Asts: Jerry West 11
Series tied, 1–1

The Forum, Inglewood, California
Attendance: 17,501

April 2

Boxscore

Los Angeles Lakers 98, Phoenix Suns 112
Scoring by quarter: 27–21, 19–23, 25–33, 27–35
Pts: Jerry West 31; Rebs: Wilt Chamberlain 12; Asts: Chamberlain, West 7 each	Pts: Gail Goodrich 29; Rebs: Paul Silas 16; Asts: Connie Hawkins 9
Phoenix leads series, 2–1

Arizona Veterans Memorial Coliseum, Phoenix, Arizona
Attendance: 12,324

April 4

Boxscore

Los Angeles Lakers 102, Phoenix Suns 112
Scoring by quarter: 24–33, 29–23, 21–26, 28–30
Pts: Wilt Chamberlain 29; Rebs: Wilt Chamberlain 19; Asts: Keith Erickson 6	Pts: Gail Goodrich 34; Rebs: Paul Silas 16; Asts: Gail Goodrich 11
Phoenix leads series, 3–1

Arizona Veterans Memorial Coliseum, Phoenix, Arizona
Attendance: 12,356

April 5

Boxscore

Phoenix Suns 121, Los Angeles Lakers 138
Scoring by quarter: 30–31, 32–41, 31–27, 28–29
Pts: Connie Hawkins 28; Rebs: Connie Hawkins 19; Asts: three players 5 each	Pts: Chamberlain, West 36 each Rebs: Mel Counts 17; Asts: Jerry West 18
Phoenix leads series, 3–2

The Forum, Inglewood, California
Attendance: 17,475

April 7

Boxscore

Los Angeles Lakers 104, Phoenix Suns 93
Scoring by quarter: 22–26, 24–17, 27–30, 31–20
Pts: Jerry West 35; Rebs: Wilt Chamberlain 26; Asts: Wilt Chamberlain 11	Pts: Connie Hawkins 24; Rebs: Paul Silas 21; Asts: Van Arsdale, Goodrich 4 each
Series tied, 3–3

Arizona Veterans Memorial Coliseum, Phoenix, Arizona
Attendance: 12,386

April 9

Boxscore

Phoenix Suns 94, Los Angeles Lakers 129
Scoring by quarter: 21–33, 19–30, 24–26, 30–40
Pts: Connie Hawkins 25; Rebs: Connie Hawkins 15; Asts: Hawkins, Silas 4 each	Pts: Wilt Chamberlain 30; Rebs: Wilt Chamberlain 27; Asts: Jerry West 15
Los Angeles wins series, 4–3

The Forum, Inglewood, California
Attendance: 17,519

- The Lakers become the second team to come back from a 3–1 series deficit.

This was the first playoff meeting between these two teams.

== Division Finals ==
=== Eastern Division Finals ===
==== (1) New York Knicks vs. (2) Milwaukee Bucks ====
April 11

Boxscore

Milwaukee Bucks 102, New York Knicks 110
Scoring by quarter: 19–24, 25–30, 24–28, 34–28
Pts: Kareem Abdul-Jabbar 35; Rebs: Kareem Abdul-Jabbar 15; Asts: Kareem Abdul-Jabbar 5	Pts: Willis Reed 24; Rebs: Dave DeBusschere 16; Asts: Bill Bradley 6
New York leads series, 1–0

Madison Square Garden, New York City, New York
Attendance: 19,500

April 13

Boxscore

Milwaukee Bucks 111, New York Knicks 112
Scoring by quarter: 33–35, 33–28, 24–23, 21–26
Pts: Kareem Abdul-Jabbar 38; Rebs: Kareem Abdul-Jabbar 23; Asts: Kareem Abdul-Jabbar 11	Pts: Willis Reed 36; Rebs: Willis Reed 19; Asts: Walt Frazier 14
New York leads series, 2–0

Madison Square Garden, New York City, New York
Attendance: 19,500

April 17

Boxscore

New York Knicks 96, Milwaukee Bucks 101
Scoring by quarter: 16–29, 31–29, 21–23, 28–20
Pts: Willis Reed 21; Rebs: Reed, DeBusschere 10 each Asts: Walt Frazier 7	Pts: Kareem Abdul-Jabbar 33; Rebs: Kareem Abdul-Jabbar 31; Asts: Bob Dandridge 8
New York leads series, 2–1

Milwaukee Arena, Milwaukee, Wisconsin
Attendance: 10,746
Referees: Mendy Rudolph, Manny Sokolofosky

April 19

Boxscore

New York Knicks 117, Milwaukee Bucks 105
Scoring by quarter: 29–23, 36–22, 17–34, 35–26
Pts: Willis Reed 26; Rebs: Walt Frazier 11; Asts: Dick Barnett 8	Pts: Kareem Abdul-Jabbar 38; Rebs: Abdul-Jabbar, Smith 9 each Asts: Flynn Robinson 7
New York leads series, 3–1

Milwaukee Arena, Milwaukee, Wisconsin
Attendance: 10,746
Referees: Eddie Rush, Richie Powers

April 20

Boxscore

Milwaukee Bucks 96, New York Knicks 132
Scoring by quarter: 19–35, 26–34, 27–32, 24–31
Pts: Kareem Abdul-Jabbar 27; Rebs: Zaid Abdul-Aziz 12; Asts: Guy Rodgers 6	Pts: Willis Reed 32; Rebs: Dave DeBusschere 11; Asts: Walt Frazier 6
New York wins series, 4–1

Madison Square Garden, New York City, New York
Attendance: 19,500

- Guy Rodgers' final NBA game.

This was the first playoff meeting between these two teams.

=== Western Division Finals ===
==== (1) Atlanta Hawks vs. (2) Los Angeles Lakers ====
April 12

Boxscore

Los Angeles Lakers 119, Atlanta Hawks 115
Scoring by quarter: 25–28, 27–39, 36–26, 31–22
Pts: Jerry West 38; Rebs: Wilt Chamberlain 17; Asts: Wilt Chamberlain 8	Pts: Walt Hazzard 29; Rebs: Walt Bellamy 21; Asts: Lou Hudson 8
Los Angeles leads series, 1–0

Alexander Memorial Coliseum, Atlanta, Georgia
Attendance: 7,197

April 14

Boxscore

Los Angeles Lakers 105, Atlanta Hawks 94
Scoring by quarter: 25–26, 21–22, 32–18, 27–28
Pts: Chamberlain, West 24 each Rebs: Wilt Chamberlain 24; Asts: Keith Erickson 7	Pts: Walt Bellamy 20; Rebs: Bill Bridges 19; Asts: Joe Caldwell 7
Los Angeles leads series, 2–0

Alexander Memorial Coliseum, Atlanta, Georgia
Attendance: 7,197

April 17

Boxscore

Atlanta Hawks 114, Los Angeles Lakers 115 (OT)
Scoring by quarter: 23–25, 32–25, 23–30, 27–25, Overtime: 9–10
Pts: Hudson, Beard 22 each Rebs: Bill Bridges 19; Asts: Lou Hudson 6	Pts: Jerry West 35; Rebs: Wilt Chamberlain 26; Asts: Jerry West 13
Los Angeles leads series, 3–0

The Forum, Inglewood, California
Attendance: 17,183

- Wilt Chamberlain makes the winning free throws in overtime with Jerry West on the bench with six fouls.

April 19

Boxscore

Atlanta Hawks 114, Los Angeles Lakers 133
Scoring by quarter: 30–24, 26–32, 33–32, 25–45
Pts: Richie Guerin 31; Rebs: Bill Bridges 18; Asts: Caldwell, Hudson 5 each	Pts: Jerry West 39; Rebs: Wilt Chamberlain 21; Asts: Jerry West 12
Los Angeles wins series, 4–0

The Forum, Inglewood, California
Attendance: 17,410

This was the 10th playoff meeting between these two teams, with the Hawks winning five of the first nine meetings.

Previous playoff series
Atlanta leads 5–4 in all-time playoff series

1956

St. Louis Hawks 2, Minneapolis Lakers 1

1956 Western Division Semifinals

1957

St. Louis Hawks 3, Minneapolis Lakers 0

1957 Western Division Finals

1959

St. Louis Hawks 2, Minneapolis Lakers 4

1959 Western Division Finals

1960

St. Louis Hawks 4, Minneapolis Lakers 3

1960 Western Division Finals

1961

St. Louis Hawks 4, Los Angeles Lakers 3

1961 Western Division Finals

1963

St. Louis Hawks 3, Los Angeles Lakers 4

1963 Western Division Finals

1964

St. Louis Hawks 3, Los Angeles Lakers 2

1964 Western Division Semifinals

1966

St. Louis Hawks 3, Los Angeles Lakers 4

1966 Western Division Finals

1969

Atlanta Hawks 1, Los Angeles Lakers 4

1969 Western Division Finals

== NBA Finals: (E1) New York Knicks vs. (W2) Los Angeles Lakers ==
April 24

Boxscore

Los Angeles Lakers 112, New York Knicks 124
Scoring by quarter: 25–35, 29–30, 38–24, 20–35
Pts: Jerry West 33; Rebs: Wilt Chamberlain 24; Asts: Wilt Chamberlain 5	Pts: Willis Reed 37; Rebs: Reed, DeBusschere 16 each Asts: Dick Barnett 9
New York leads series, 1–0

Madison Square Garden, New York City, New York
Attendance: 19,500

April 27

Boxscore

Los Angeles Lakers 105, New York Knicks 103
Scoring by quarter: 28–24, 24–28, 29–29, 24–22
Pts: Jerry West 34; Rebs: Wilt Chamberlain 24; Asts: Garrett, Erickson 6 each	Pts: Willis Reed 29; Rebs: Willis Reed 15; Asts: Walt Frazier 11
Series tied, 1–1

Madison Square Garden, New York City, New York
Attendance: 19,500

April 29

Boxscore

New York Knicks 111, Los Angeles Lakers 108 (OT)
Scoring by quarter: 20–26, 22–30, 26–17, 34–29, Overtime: 9–6
Pts: Willis Reed 38; Rebs: Willis Reed 17; Asts: Walt Frazier 7	Pts: Jerry West 34; Rebs: Wilt Chamberlain 26; Asts: Elgin Baylor 11
New York leads series, 2–1

The Forum, Inglewood, California
Attendance: 17,500

- Jerry West (who suffered a jammed thumb in the first half) hit a desperation buzzer-beating 60-foot shot to tie it at 102 and force overtime. The Knicks pulled ahead in overtime for good when Willis Reed shot a free throw and Dick Barnett made a field goal to close the scoring. Bandaged hand and all, West later stated that the Lakers would beat the Knicks in the next game.

May 1

Boxscore

New York Knicks 115, Los Angeles Lakers 121 (OT)
Scoring by quarter: 27–24, 20–30, 20–17, 32–28, Overtime: 16–22
Pts: Dick Barnett 29; Rebs: Dave Stallworth 13; Asts: Walt Frazier 11	Pts: Jerry West 37; Rebs: Wilt Chamberlain 25; Asts: Jerry West 18
Series tied, 2–2

The Forum, Inglewood, California
Attendance: 17,509

May 4

Boxscore

Los Angeles Lakers 100, New York Knicks 107
Scoring by quarter: 30–20, 23–20, 29–35, 18–32
Pts: Wilt Chamberlain 22; Rebs: Wilt Chamberlain 19; Asts: Keith Erickson 6	Pts: Walt Frazier 21; Rebs: Cazzie Russell 8 Asts: Walt Frazier 12
New York leads series, 3–2

Madison Square Garden, New York City, New York
Attendance: 19,500

May 6

Boxscore

New York Knicks 113, Los Angeles Lakers 135
Scoring by quarter: 16–36, 35–35, 29–28, 33–36
Pts: Dave DeBusschere 25; Rebs: Dave DeBusschere 9 Asts: Dick Barnett 8	Pts: Wilt Chamberlain 45; Rebs: Wilt Chamberlain 27; Asts: Jerry West 13
Series tied, 3–3

The Forum, Inglewood, California
Attendance: 17,509

May 8

Boxscore

Los Angeles Lakers 99, New York Knicks 113
Scoring by quarter: 24–38, 18–31, 27–25, 30–19
Pts: Jerry West 28; Rebs: Wilt Chamberlain 24; Asts: Keith Erickson 6	Pts: Walt Frazier 36; Rebs: Dave DeBusschere 17; Asts: Walt Frazier 19
New York wins series, 4–3

Madison Square Garden, New York City, New York
Attendance: 19,500

- Willis Reed surprised the fans by walking onto the court during warmups, prompting widespread applause and inspiring the Knicks to win the title.

This was the third playoff meeting between these two teams, with the Lakers winning the first two meetings while based in Minneapolis.

Previous playoff series
Los Angeles/ Minneapolis leads 2–0 in all-time playoff series

1952

Minneapolis Lakers 4, New York Knicks 3

1952 NBA Finals

1953

Minneapolis Lakers 4, New York Knicks 1

1953 NBA Finals
