= 1977–78 Indiana Pacers season =

NBA professional basketball team season

- Head coach: Bobby Leonard
- Arena: Market Square Arena

Results
- Record: 31–51 (.378)
- Place: Division: 5th (Midwest); Conference: 10th (Western)
- Playoff finish: Did not qualify
- Stats at Basketball Reference

Local media
- Television: WTTV
- Radio: WIBC

The 1977–78 Indiana Pacers season was Indiana's second season in the National Basketball Association and 11th season as a franchise.

== Draft picks ==
Round	Pick	Player	Position	Nationality	College
2	29	Alonzo Bradley	SF	United States	Texas Southern
3	51	Stan Mayhew		United States	Weber State
4	73	George Pendleton		United States	Georgia State
5	95	Marvin Jackson		United States	Prairie View A&M
6	117	Tom Scheffler	C	United States	Purdue

== Roster ==
1977–78 Indiana Pacers roster
Players

Pos.	No.	Player	Height	Weight	DOB	From
SF	42	Mike Bantom	6 ft 9 in (2.06 m)	200 lb (91 kg)		Saint Joseph's
PF	1	Ron Behagen	6 ft 9 in (2.06 m)	185 lb (84 kg)		Minnesota
PF	9	Mel Bennett	6 ft 7 in (2.01 m)	200 lb (91 kg)		Pittsburgh
SG	30	Bob Carrington	6 ft 6 in (1.98 m)	195 lb (88 kg)		Boston College
C	40	James Edwards	7 ft 0 in (2.13 m)	225 lb (102 kg)		Washington
C	41	Len Elmore	6 ft 9 in (2.06 m)	220 lb (100 kg)		Maryland
PG	44	Mike Flynn	6 ft 2 in (1.88 m)	180 lb (82 kg)		Kentucky
SF	24	Steve Green	6 ft 7 in (2.01 m)	220 lb (100 kg)		Indiana
PF	32	Dan Roundfield	6 ft 8 in (2.03 m)	205 lb (93 kg)		Central Michigan
PG	14	Ricky Sobers	6 ft 3 in (1.91 m)	198 lb (90 kg)		UNLV
SG	43	Earl Tatum	6 ft 5 in (1.96 m)	185 lb (84 kg)		Marquette

Coaches
Head coach
- Slick Leonard
Assistant(s)
- Jerry Oliver

Legend
- (DP) Unsigned draft pick
- (FA) Free agent
- (S) Suspended
- Injured

== Regular season ==
=== Season standings ===
Midwest Division	W	L	PCT	GB	Home	Road	Div
y-Denver Nuggets	48	34	.585	–	33–8	15–26	11–9
x-Milwaukee Bucks	44	38	.537	4	28–13	16–25	14–6
Chicago Bulls	40	42	.488	8	29–12	11–30	8–12
Detroit Pistons	38	44	.463	10	24–17	14–27	8–12
Indiana Pacers	31	51	.378	17	21–20	10–31	8–12
Kansas City Kings	31	51	.378	17	22–19	9–32	11–9

#	Western Conference				
#	Team	W	L	PCT	GB
1	z-Portland Trail Blazers	58	24	.707	–
2	y-Denver Nuggets	48	34	.585	10
3	x-Phoenix Suns	49	33	.598	9
4	x-Seattle SuperSonics	47	35	.573	11
5	x-Los Angeles Lakers	45	37	.549	13
6	x-Milwaukee Bucks	44	38	.537	14
7	Golden State Warriors	43	39	.524	15
8	Chicago Bulls	40	42	.488	18
9	Detroit Pistons	38	44	.463	20
10	Indiana Pacers	31	51	.378	27
11	Kansas City Kings	31	51	.378	27

z – clinched division title
y – clinched division title
x – clinched playoff spot

== Game log ==
=== Regular season ===
1977–78 game log
Total: 31–51 (Home: 27–14; Road: 17–24)
October: 3–2 (home: 3–1; road: 0–1)

Game	Date	Team	Score	High points	High rebounds	High assists	Location Attendance	Record
5	October 28, 1977; 7:05 p.m. EST	Washington	W 136–127				Market Square Arena; 12,542	3–2

November: 4–11 (home: 2–3; road: 2–8)

Game	Date	Team	Score	High points	High rebounds	High assists	Location Attendance	Record

December: 7–4 (home: 5–2; road: 2–2)

Game	Date	Team	Score	High points	High rebounds	High assists	Location Attendance	Record

January: 5–11 (home: 4–3; road: 1–8)

Game
Date
Team
Score
High points
High rebounds
High assists
Location
Attendance
Record
34
January 6, 1978
8:05 p.m. EST
@ Washington
L 114–146

Capital Centre9,215

15–19

February: 3–11 (home: 2–5; road: 1–6)

Game	Date	Team	Score	High points	High rebounds	High assists	Location Attendance	Record
All-Star Break
57	February 17, 1978; 8:05 p.m. EST	Washington	W 123–111				Market Square Arena; 10,637	21–36

March: 7–10 (home: 5–4; road: 2–6)

Game	Date	Team	Score	High points	High rebounds	High assists	Location Attendance	Record
69	March 17, 1978; 8:05 p.m. EST	@ Washington	W 105–99				Capital Centre; 8,196	27–42

April: 2–2 (home: 0–2; road: 2–0)

Game	Date	Team	Score	High points	High rebounds	High assists	Location Attendance	Record

1977–78 schedule

== Player statistics ==
=== Regular season ===
Player	POS	GP	GS	MP	REB	AST	STL	BLK	PTS	MPG	RPG	APG	SPG	BPG	PPG
Mike Bantom	SF	82		2,775	610	238	100	50	1,258	33.8	7.4	2.9	1.2	.6	15.3
Ricky Sobers	PG	79		3,019	327	584	170	23	1,436	38.2	4.1	7.4	2.2	.3	18.2
Dan Roundfield	PF	79		2,423	802	196	81	149	1,060	30.7	10.2	2.5	1.0	1.9	13.4
Mike Flynn	PG	71		955	117	142	41	10	295	13.5	1.6	2.0	.6	.1	4.2
Len Elmore	C	69		1,327	420	80	74	71	372	19.2	6.1	1.2	1.1	1.0	5.4
James Edwards^{†}	C	58		1,682	435	56	37	50	892	29.0	7.5	1.0	.6	.9	15.4
Earl Tatum^{†}	SG	57		1,859	205	226	103	30	822	32.6	3.6	4.0	1.8	.5	14.4
Ron Behagen^{†}	PF	51		1,131	333	65	32	19	572	22.2	6.5	1.3	.6	.4	11.2
Steve Green	SF	44		449	71	30	14	2	151	10.2	1.6	.7	.3	.0	3.4
John Williamson^{†}	SG	42		1,449	120	132	47	0	804	34.5	2.9	3.1	1.1	.0	19.1
Bob Carrington^{†}	SG	35		621	62	62	22	11	250	17.7	1.8	1.8	.6	.3	7.1
Mel Bennett	PF	31		285	93	22	11	7	74	9.2	3.0	.7	.4	.2	2.4
Adrian Dantley^{†}	SF	23		948	216	65	48	17	609	41.2	9.4	2.8	2.1	.7	26.5
Dave Robisch^{†}	C	23		598	173	48	20	15	196	26.0	7.5	2.1	.9	.7	8.5
Johnny Neumann	SG	20		216	14	27	6	1	83	10.8	.7	1.4	.3	.1	4.2
Bobby Wilson	SG	12		86	12	8	2	1	30	7.2	1.0	.7	.2	.1	2.5
Willie Smith	PG	1		7	0	1	0	0	0	7.0	.0	1.0	.0	.0	.0

- ^{†} Denotes player spent time with another team in the season. Stats reflect time with the Pacers only.

== Awards and records ==
- Don Buse, NBA All-Defensive First Team
