= 1977–78 Detroit Pistons season =

NBA team season

- Head coach: Herb Brown (fired); Bob Kauffman
- General manager: Bob Kauffman
- Owner: Bill Davidson
- Arena: Cobo Arena

Results
- Record: 38–44 (.463)
- Place: Division: 4th (Midwest); Conference: 9th (Western)
- Playoff finish: Did not qualify
- Stats at Basketball Reference

Local media
- Television: WKBD-TV
- Radio: WJR

The 1977–78 Detroit Pistons season was the Detroit Pistons' 30th season in the NBA and 21st season in the city of Detroit. The team played at Cobo Arena in Detroit.

It was the last season playing in Detroit, until the 2017-18 season when the team returned to the city proper. 1977-78 was the franchise's final season in Cobo Arena, as they moved to the Pontiac Silverdome in the Detroit suburbs, also the home of the NFL's Detroit Lions, the next season.

The Pistons finished with a 38-44 (.463) record, 4th place in the Midwest Division. Tensions lingered from the previous season, especially between coach Herb Brown and point guard Kevin Porter. Before the season began, the two tried to make peace, with Porter stating, "This year when I'm yanked I'll accept it," and Brown replying, "I may have made some mistakes." Team captain Bob Lanier, would add, "You can't change human nature. To be fair they should trade one of them." Porter was traded in November, 8 games into the season, to the New Jersey Nets and would lead the NBA in assists on the season. Brown was fired a month later. Then, with Brown gone, Porter would return in a trade to Detroit the following season.

Forward Marvin "Bad News" Barnes would report to the Adult Correctional Institute in Cranston, Rhode Island in the 1977 off-season to serve a 152-day sentence. He had pleaded guilty to a two-year-old charge that he had attacked Providence teammate Larry Ketvirtis with a tire iron. The judge gave him three years of probation. An October 1976 gun incident at the Detroit airport in which Barnes tried to get a weapon through security was a probation violation, causing the judge to require the completion of that initial sentence. Barnes was traded to the Buffalo Braves in November, bringing Gus Gerard and John Shumate to Detroit.

The team was led by center Bob Lanier (24.5 ppg, 11.3 rpg, NBA All-Star) and guard Eric Money (18.6 ppg, 4.7 apg), out of the playoffs for the first time in 4 seasons.

== Draft picks ==
Round	Pick	Player	Position	Nationality	College / Team
2	36	Ben Poquette	Center	United States	Central Michigan

== Roster ==
1977–78 Detroit Pistons roster
Players

Pos.	No.	Player	Height	Weight	DOB	From
F	30	M. L. Carr	6 ft 6 in (1.98 m)	205 lb (93 kg)		Guilford
C	13	Leon Douglas	6 ft 10 in (2.08 m)	230 lb (104 kg)		Alabama
SF	44	Al Eberhard	6 ft 6 in (1.98 m)	225 lb (102 kg)		Missouri
G/F	42	Chris Ford	6 ft 5 in (1.96 m)	190 lb (86 kg)		Villanova
F	22	Gus Gerard	6 ft 8 in (2.03 m)	205 lb (93 kg)		Virginia
C	16	Bob Lanier	6 ft 11 in (2.11 m)	250 lb (113 kg)		St. Bonaventure
G	14	Eric Money	6 ft 0 in (1.83 m)	175 lb (79 kg)		Arizona
C	50	Ben Poquette	6 ft 9 in (2.06 m)	235 lb (107 kg)		Central Michigan
PG	15	Jim Price	6 ft 3 in (1.91 m)	195 lb (88 kg)		Louisville
F	34	John Shumate	6 ft 9 in (2.06 m)	235 lb (107 kg)		Notre Dame
SG	35	Al Skinner	6 ft 3 in (1.91 m)	190 lb (86 kg)		UMass

Coaches
Head coach
- Bob Kauffman

Legend
- (DP) Unsigned draft pick
- (FA) Free agent
- (S) Suspended
- Injured

== Regular season ==
=== Season standings ===
Midwest Division	W	L	PCT	GB	Home	Road	Div
y-Denver Nuggets	48	34	.585	–	33–8	15–26	11–9
x-Milwaukee Bucks	44	38	.537	4	28–13	16–25	14–6
Chicago Bulls	40	42	.488	8	29–12	11–30	8–12
Detroit Pistons	38	44	.463	10	24–17	14–27	8–12
Indiana Pacers	31	51	.378	17	21–20	10–31	8–12
Kansas City Kings	31	51	.378	17	22–19	9–32	11–9

#	Western Conference				
#	Team	W	L	PCT	GB
1	z-Portland Trail Blazers	58	24	.707	–
2	y-Denver Nuggets	48	34	.585	10
3	x-Phoenix Suns	49	33	.598	9
4	x-Seattle SuperSonics	47	35	.573	11
5	x-Los Angeles Lakers	45	37	.549	13
6	x-Milwaukee Bucks	44	38	.537	14
7	Golden State Warriors	43	39	.524	15
8	Chicago Bulls	40	42	.488	18
9	Detroit Pistons	38	44	.463	20
10	Indiana Pacers	31	51	.378	27
11	Kansas City Kings	31	51	.378	27

z – clinched division title
y – clinched division title
x – clinched playoff spot

== Game log ==
=== Regular season ===
1977–78 game log
Total: 38–44 (home: 24–17; road: 14–27)
October: 4–3 (home: 4–0; road: 0–3)

Game	Date	Team	Score	High points	High rebounds	High assists	Location Attendance	Record
3	October 21, 1977; 8:05 p.m. EDT	@ Washington	L 109–117	Lanier (33)	Lanier (10)	Lanier (6)	Capital Centre; 13,276	1–2

November: 4–8 (home: 3–4; road: 1–4)

Game	Date	Team	Score	High points	High rebounds	High assists	Location Attendance	Record
11	November 13, 1977; 7:05 p.m. EST	Washington	W 104–102	Money (36)	Douglas (13)	Money (7)	Cobo Arena; 5,149	6–5

December: 7–7 (home: 3–5; road: 4–2)

Game	Date	Team	Score	High points	High rebounds	High assists	Location Attendance	Record

January: 7–7 (home: 4–1; road: 3–6)

Game	Date	Team	Score	High points	High rebounds	High assists	Location Attendance	Record
44	January 24, 1978; 8:05 p.m. EST	@ Washington	W 104–101	Lanier (24)	Lanier (11)	Carr, Money (4)	Capital Centre; 6,717	19–25

February: 6–7 (home: 5–3; road: 1–4)

Game	Date	Team	Score	High points	High rebounds	High assists	Location Attendance	Record
All-Star Break

March: 8–8 (home: 4–3; road: 4–5)

Game	Date	Team	Score	High points	High rebounds	High assists	Location Attendance	Record
62	March 3, 1978; 8:05 p.m. EST	Washington	L 108–124	Money (20)	Poquette (12)	Money (7)	Cobo Arena; 5,033	29–33

April: 2–4 (home: 1–1; road: 1–3)

Game	Date	Team	Score	High points	High rebounds	High assists	Location Attendance	Record

1977–78 schedule
