= 1977–78 Phoenix Suns season =

Professional basketball season

- Head coach: John MacLeod
- General manager: Jerry Colangelo
- Owners: Karl Eller, Don Pitt, Don Diamond, Bhavik Darji, Marvin Meyer, Richard L. Bloch
- Arena: Arizona Veterans Memorial Coliseum

Results
- Record: 49–33 (.598)
- Place: Division: 2nd (Pacific); Conference: 3rd (Western)
- Playoff finish: First round (lost to Bucks 0–2)
- Stats at Basketball Reference

Local media
- Television: KTAR-TV
- Radio: KTAR

The 1977–78 Phoenix Suns season was the tenth season for the Phoenix Suns of the National Basketball Association. The team finished second in a Pacific division that did not have a team finish below .500, as the Suns returned to the playoffs for the third time in franchise history. The Suns were led by head coach John MacLeod and played all home games in Arizona Veterans Memorial Coliseum.

Both Paul Westphal and Walter Davis, a rookie from the University of North Carolina, were selected to participate in the All-Star Game and by the end of the season, both were members of the All-NBA Second Team. Davis became the second Sun in three years to be selected as Rookie of the Year, an award teammate Alvan Adams had collected after the 1975–76 season.

Both Westphal and rookie Davis averaged career-highs in scoring, averaging 25.2 and 24.2 points a game. The combined averaged of 49.4 points made for the league's highest-scoring duo on the season. Additionally, Westphal and Davis broke a franchise record of 45.9 points a game, a mark set by Connie Hawkins and Dick Van Arsdale during the 1969–70 season.

== Offseason ==
=== NBA draft ===
Round	Pick	Player	Position	Nationality	College
1	5	Walter Davis	Guard	United States	North Carolina
3	66	Mike Bratz	Guard	United States	Stanford
4	71	Greg Griffin	Forward	United States	Idaho State
5	93	Cecil Rellford	Forward	United States	St. John's
6	115	Billy McKinney	Guard	United States	Northwestern
7	136	Alvin Scott	Forward	United States	Oral Roberts
8	156	Alvin Joseph	Center	United States	California-Riverside

The Suns used their first-round pick to select swingman Walter Davis from North Carolina. Davis averaged 15.7 points, 5.6 rebounds and 3.4 assists per game in four years with the Tar Heels. He would make an immediate impact with the Suns, helping the team make a 15-game improvement and return to the playoffs. Averaging 24.2 points, 6.0 rebounds and 3.4 assists per game his first season, Davis was named Rookie of the Year, receiving 49 1/4 of 66 votes. He would also be named to the All-NBA Second Team, and would finish fifth in Most Valuable Player voting, behind winner Bill Walton, George Gervin, David Thompson and Kareem Abdul-Jabbar. Davis spent his first eleven seasons with the Suns before joining the Denver Nuggets as the league's second unrestricted free agent in 1988. He left as the Suns' all-time leading scorer (15,666 points), and had his #6 jersey retired by the franchise in 1994.

== Roster ==
1977–78 Phoenix Suns roster
Players

Pos.	No.	Player	Height	Weight	DOB	From
C	33	Alvan Adams	6 ft 9 in (2.06 m)	210 lb (95 kg)	1954-07-19	Oklahoma
C	21	Dennis Awtrey	6 ft 10 in (2.08 m)	235 lb (107 kg)	1948-02-22	Santa Clara
G	23	Mike Bratz	6 ft 2 in (1.88 m)	185 lb (84 kg)	1955-10-17	Stanford
G	10	Don Buse	6 ft 4 in (1.93 m)	190 lb (86 kg)	1950-08-10	Evansville
G/F	6	Walter Davis	6 ft 6 in (1.98 m)	193 lb (88 kg)	1954-09-09	North Carolina
C	35	Bayard Forrest	6 ft 10 in (2.08 m)	235 lb (107 kg)	1954-07-08	Grand Canyon
F	25	Greg Griffin	6 ft 7 in (2.01 m)	190 lb (86 kg)	1952-09-06	Idaho State
F	24	Garfield Heard	6 ft 6 in (1.98 m)	219 lb (99 kg)	1948-05-03	Oklahoma
G	30	Ron Lee	6 ft 4 in (1.93 m)	193 lb (88 kg)	1952-11-02	Oregon
F	18	Curtis Perry (injured)	6 ft 7 in (2.01 m)	220 lb (100 kg)	1948-09-13	Missouri State
F	14	Alvin Scott	6 ft 7 in (2.01 m)	185 lb (84 kg)	1955-09-14	Oral Roberts
F	32	Ira Terrell (injured) (IN)	6 ft 8 in (2.03 m)	200 lb (91 kg)	1954-06-19	SMU
G	44	Paul Westphal	6 ft 4 in (1.93 m)	195 lb (88 kg)	1950-11-30	USC

Coaches
Head coach
- John MacLeod (Bellarmine)
Assistant(s)
- Al Bianchi (Bowling Green)

Legend
- (DP) Unsigned draft pick
- (FA) Free agent
- (S) Suspended
- Injured

== Regular season ==
=== Standings ===
Pacific Division	W	L	PCT	GB	Home	Road	Div
y-Portland Trail Blazers	58	24	.707	–	36–5	22–19	13–3
x-Phoenix Suns	49	33	.598	9	34–7	15–26	8–8
x-Seattle SuperSonics	47	35	.573	11	31–10	16–25	8–8
x-Los Angeles Lakers	45	37	.549	13	29–12	16–25	6–10
Golden State Warriors	43	39	.524	15	30–11	13–28	5–11

#	Western Conference				
#	Team	W	L	PCT	GB
1	z-Portland Trail Blazers	58	24	.707	–
2	y-Denver Nuggets	48	34	.585	10
3	x-Phoenix Suns	49	33	.598	9
4	x-Seattle SuperSonics	47	35	.573	11
5	x-Los Angeles Lakers	45	37	.549	13
6	x-Milwaukee Bucks	44	38	.537	14
7	Golden State Warriors	43	39	.524	15
8	Chicago Bulls	40	42	.488	18
9	Detroit Pistons	38	44	.463	20
10	Indiana Pacers	31	51	.378	27
11	Kansas City Kings	31	51	.378	27

=== Game log ===
1977–78 game log
Total: 49–33 (home: 34–7; road: 15–26)
October: 3–3 (home: 2–1; road: 1–2)

Game	Date	Team	Score	High points	High rebounds	High assists	Location Attendance	Record
1	October 18	Golden State	W 100–83	Alvan Adams (27)			Arizona Veterans Memorial Coliseum; 9,128	1–0
2	October 23	@ Los Angeles	W 104–101	Paul Westphal (26)			The Forum; 10,481	2–0
3	October 25	Seattle	W 93–86	Paul Westphal (30)			Arizona Veterans Memorial Coliseum; 10,917	3–0
4	October 28	@ New Orleans	L 107–114	Paul Westphal (23)			Louisiana Superdome; 10,342	3–1
5	October 29	@ Houston	L 112–125	Paul Westphal (28)			The Summit; 8,557	3–2
6	October 31	San Antonio	L 143–145	Paul Westphal (37)			Arizona Veterans Memorial Coliseum; 10,030	3–3

November: 8–4 (home: 6–0; road: 2–4)

Game	Date	Team	Score	High points	High rebounds	High assists	Location Attendance	Record
7	November 3	@ San Antonio	W 110–89	Walter Davis (24)			HemisFair Arena; 8,394	4–3
8	November 4, 1977; 6:05 p.m. MST	@ Washington	L 96–113	Ron Lee (21)			Capital Centre; 8,742	4–4
9	November 5	@ Chicago	L 94–111	Walter Davis (25)			Chicago Stadium; 13,424	4–5
10	November 10	New Orleans	W 127–111	Alvan Adams (35)			Arizona Veterans Memorial Coliseum; 10,297	5–5
11	November 13	Indiana	W 116–107	Ron Lee (24)			Arizona Veterans Memorial Coliseum; 12,550	6–5
12	November 18	Chicago	W 103–101	Walter Davis, Paul Westphal (25)			Arizona Veterans Memorial Coliseum; 12,543	7–5
13	November 20	San Antonio	W 134–112	Alvan Adams (32)			Arizona Veterans Memorial Coliseum; 9,677	8–5
14	November 22	Los Angeles	W 118–107	Walter Davis (34)			Arizona Veterans Memorial Coliseum; 10,130	9–5
15	November 24	@ Cleveland	L 82–97	Paul Westphal (22)			Coliseum at Richfield; 15,445	9–6
16	November 25	@ Indiana	W 118–110	Alvan Adams, Paul Westphal (30)			Market Square Arena; 15,448	10–6
17	November 27	Denver	W 115–97	Paul Westphal (48)			Arizona Veterans Memorial Coliseum; 10,658	11–6
18	November 29	@ Portland	L 96–108	Walter Davis, Paul Westphal (25)			Memorial Coliseum; 12,666	11–7

December: 10–6 (home: 5–2; road: 5–4)

Game	Date	Team	Score	High points	High rebounds	High assists	Location Attendance	Record
19	December 2	Portland	L 103–106	Paul Westphal (32)			Arizona Veterans Memorial Coliseum; 12,660	11–8
20	December 4	Atlanta	L 89–96	Alvan Adams (18)			Arizona Veterans Memorial Coliseum; 9,577	11–9
21	December 6	@ Kansas City	W 103–92	Walter Davis (29)			Kemper Arena; 5,976	12–9
22	December 7	@ Detroit	W 113–107 (OT)	Walter Davis, Paul Westphal (27)			Cobo Arena; 3,588	13–9
23	December 10	Houston	W 110–93	Walter Davis (29)			Arizona Veterans Memorial Coliseum; 8,761	14–9
24	December 14	Buffalo	W 113–103	Paul Westphal (29)			Arizona Veterans Memorial Coliseum; 10,597	15–9
25	December 16	@ New Orleans	W 126–113	Walter Davis (24)			Louisiana Superdome; 8,172	16–9
26	December 17	@ Houston	W 101–97	Paul Westphal (26)			The Summit; 8,134	17–9
27	December 18	@ Atlanta	L 129–134 (2OT)	Walter Davis (33)			Omni Coliseum; 8,062	17–10
28	December 20	@ New York	W 110–99	Paul Westphal (32)			Madison Square Garden; 13,548	18–10
29	December 21	@ Philadelphia	L 119–125	Walter Davis (35)			The Spectrum; 14,671	18–11
30	December 23	Boston	W 129–110	Paul Westphal (19)			Arizona Veterans Memorial Coliseum; 12,660	19–11
31	December 26	@ Denver	L 108–127	Walter Davis (23)			McNichols Sports Arena; 17,297	19–12
32	December 27	Seattle	W 131–105	Ron Lee (30)			Arizona Veterans Memorial Coliseum; 12,543	20–12
33	December 29	Kansas City	W 110–104	Walter Davis, Paul Westphal (33)			Arizona Veterans Memorial Coliseum; 12,660	21–12
34	December 30	@ Seattle	L 110–121	Paul Westphal (32)			Seattle Center Coliseum; 14,098	21–13

January: 12–2 (home: 8–0; road: 4–2)

Game	Date	Team	Score	High points	High rebounds	High assists	Location Attendance	Record
35	January 3	@ Milwaukee	W 125–103	Paul Westphal (34)			MECCA Arena; 8,571	22–13
36	January 4	@ New Jersey	L 83–115	Paul Westphal (21)			Rutgers Athletic Center; 4,067	22–14
37	January 5	@ Boston	W 121–111	Paul Westphal (43)			Hartford Civic Center; 10,019	23–14
38	January 7	@ Buffalo	W 107–97	Paul Westphal (29)			Buffalo Memorial Auditorium; 7,029	24–14
39	January 11	New Orleans	W 142–99	Walter Davis (24)			Arizona Veterans Memorial Coliseum; 12,660	25–14
40	January 13	Detroit	W 111–100	Paul Westphal (26)			Arizona Veterans Memorial Coliseum; 12,660	26–14
41	January 15	Cleveland	W 113–104	Walter Davis (31)			Arizona Veterans Memorial Coliseum; 11,787	27–14
42	January 19	New York	W 134–114	Paul Westphal (31)			Arizona Veterans Memorial Coliseum; 10,935	28–14
43	January 20	@ Golden State	L 104–119	Walter Davis (31)			Oakland–Alameda County Coliseum Arena; 13,237	28–15
44	January 22, 1978; 4:45 p.m. MST	Washington	W 114–101	Paul Westphal (30)			Arizona Veterans Memorial Coliseum; 12,660	29–15
45	January 25	Houston	W 118–96	Paul Westphal (25)			Arizona Veterans Memorial Coliseum; 9,277	30–15
46	January 27	Philadelphia	W 110–101	Walter Davis (29)			Arizona Veterans Memorial Coliseum; 12,660	31–15
47	January 29	New Jersey	W 131–100	Bayard Forrest (23)			Arizona Veterans Memorial Coliseum; 10,327	32–15
48	January 31	@ Kansas City	W 112–102	Walter Davis (21)			Omaha Civic Auditorium; 5,182	33–15

February: 5–8 (home: 4–1; road: 1–7)

Game	Date	Team	Score	High points	High rebounds	High assists	Location Attendance	Record
49	February 1	@ Detroit	L 120–127	Walter Davis (26)			Cobo Arena; 5,143	33–16
50	February 3	Milwaukee	W 115–105	Walter Davis (30)			Arizona Veterans Memorial Coliseum; 12,660	34–16
All-Star Break
51	February 9	Atlanta	W 125–98	Walter Davis (28)			Arizona Veterans Memorial Coliseum; 9,877	35–16
52	February 12, 1978; 4:45 p.m. MST	Washington	W 121–109	Paul Westphal (43)			Arizona Veterans Memorial Coliseum; 12,467	36–16
53	February 14	@ Portland	L 100–113	Walter Davis (39)			Memorial Coliseum; 12,666	36–17
54	February 16	Boston	L 95–98	Walter Davis (27)			Arizona Veterans Memorial Coliseum; 12,660	36–18
55	February 17	@ Golden State	L 92–111	Alvan Adams, Walter Davis (16)			Oakland–Alameda County Coliseum Arena; 13,185	36–19
56	February 18	Indiana	W 114–101	Paul Westphal (26)			Arizona Veterans Memorial Coliseum; 12,660	37–19
57	February 21	@ Buffalo	W 114–111	Walter Davis (32)			Buffalo Memorial Auditorium; 4,409	38–19
58	February 22	@ Atlanta	L 95–107	Paul Westphal (37)			Charlotte Coliseum; 5,843	38–20
59	February 24, 1978; 6:05 p.m. MST	@ Washington	L 120–121 (OT)	Paul Westphal (35)			Capital Centre; 12,432	38–21
60	February 25	@ New York	L 115–122	Paul Westphal (27)			Madison Square Garden; 17,197	38–22
61	February 28	@ Chicago	L 115–126	Walter Davis (36)			Chicago Stadium; 14,713	38–23

March: 9–7 (home: 7–2; road: 2–5)

Game	Date	Team	Score	High points	High rebounds	High assists	Location Attendance	Record
62	March 1	Detroit	L 102–115	Paul Westphal (24)			Arizona Veterans Memorial Coliseum; 10,161	38–24
63	March 3	Milwaukee	W 132–126	Paul Westphal (31)			Arizona Veterans Memorial Coliseum; 11,139	39–24
64	March 5	Philadelphia	L 92–104	Walter Davis (25)			Arizona Veterans Memorial Coliseum; 12,145	39–25
65	March 7	@ Denver	W 126–112	Walter Davis (34)			McNichols Sports Arena; 17,428	40–25
66	March 9	Chicago	W 112–103	Paul Westphal (34)			Arizona Veterans Memorial Coliseum; 11,748	41–25
67	March 11	Los Angeles	W 120–114	Walter Davis (34)			Arizona Veterans Memorial Coliseum; 12,660	42–25
68	March 12	@ Los Angeles	L 112–128	Paul Westphal (29)			The Forum; 17,505	42–26
69	March 14	@ Milwaukee	L 106–121	Walter Davis (38)			MECCA Arena; 10,938	42–27
70	March 15	@ New Jersey	L 98–117	Alvan Adams (21)			Rutgers Athletic Center; 4,260	42–28
71	March 17	@ Boston	L 108–115	Paul Westphal (24)			Boston Garden; 15,276	42–29
72	March 19	@ Cleveland	W 123–112	Paul Westphal (39)			Coliseum at Richfield; 15,622	43–29
73	March 21	@ Indiana	L 115–119	Walter Davis (27)			Market Square Arena; 10,633	43–30
74	March 23	New York	W 120–108	Walter Davis (29)			Arizona Veterans Memorial Coliseum; 12,660	44–30
75	March 25	Buffalo	W 112–106	Alvan Adams (27)			Arizona Veterans Memorial Coliseum; 11,642	45–30
76	March 29	Portland	W 127–94	Paul Westphal (33)			Arizona Veterans Memorial Coliseum; 12,660	46–30
77	March 31	Kansas City	W 136–112	Paul Westphal (35)			Arizona Veterans Memorial Coliseum; 10,590	47–30

April: 2–3 (home: 2–1; road: 0–2)

Game	Date	Team	Score	High points	High rebounds	High assists	Location Attendance	Record
78	April 2	Golden State	W 105–99	Paul Westphal (27)			Arizona Veterans Memorial Coliseum; 11,040	48–30
79	April 4	@ San Antonio	L 119–125	Walter Davis (35)			HemisFair Arena; 9,112	48–31
80	April 6	Denver	L 105–111	Walter Davis (29)			Arizona Veterans Memorial Coliseum; 12,660	48–32
81	April 7	@ Seattle	L 83–95	Paul Westphal (16)			Seattle Center Coliseum; 14,098	48–33
82	April 8	New Jersey	W 120–109	Paul Westphal (26)			Arizona Veterans Memorial Coliseum; 12,226	49–33

1977–78 schedule

== Playoffs ==
=== Game log ===
1978 playoff game log
First Round: 0–2 (home: 0–1; road: 0–1)

Game	Date	Team	Score	High points	High rebounds	High assists	Location Attendance	Series
1	April 11	Milwaukee	L 103–111	Walter Davis (31)	Alvan Adams (9)	Paul Westphal (9)	Arizona Veterans Memorial Coliseum; 12,161	0–1
2	April 14	@ Milwaukee	L 90–94	Paul Westphal (32)	Walter Davis (9)	Paul Westphal (10)	MECCA Arena; 10,938	0–2

1978 schedule

== Awards and honors ==
=== All-Star ===
- Paul Westphal was voted as a starter for the Western Conference in the All-Star Game. It was his second consecutive All-Star selection. Westphal finished second in voting among Western Conference guards with 264,006 votes.
- Walter Davis was selected as a reserve for the Western Conference in the All-Star Game. It was his first All-Star selection.

=== Season ===
- Walter Davis received the Rookie of the Year Award.
- Paul Westphal was named to the All-NBA Second Team. Westphal also finished sixth in MVP voting.
- Walter Davis was named to the All-NBA Second Team. Davis also finished fifth in MVP voting.
- Don Buse was named to the NBA All-Defensive First Team.
- Walter Davis was named to the NBA All-Rookie First Team.
- Ron Lee led the league in steals per game with a 2.74 average, and total steals with 225.

== Player statistics ==
Legend
GP	Games played	GS	Games started	MPG	Minutes per game
FG%	Field-goal percentage	FT%	Free-throw percentage	RPG	Rebounds per game
APG	Assists per game	SPG	Steals per game	BPG	Blocks per game
PPG	Points per game

=== Season ===
Player	GP	GS	MPG	FG%	FT%	RPG	APG	SPG	BPG	PPG
Alvan Adams	70	49	27.3	.485	.730	8.1	3.2	1.2	.9	15.5
Dennis Awtrey	81	34	20.0	.424	.633	3.7	2.0	.2	.3	3.6
Mike Bratz	80	0	11.7	.403	.824	1.4	1.5	.5	.1	4.7
Don Buse	82	82	31.1	.458	.824	3.0	4.8	2.3	.2	8.4
Walter Davis	81	81	32.0	.526	.830	6.0	3.4	1.4	.2	24.2
Bayard Forrest	64	0	13.9	.466	.476	3.9	2.0	.4	.5	4.2
Greg Griffin	36	0	11.7	.361	.639	2.9	0.7	.4	.0	4.0
Garfield Heard	80	73	26.2	.424	.612	8.2	1.7	1.6	1.3	7.8
Ron Lee	82	2	23.5	.439	.746	3.1	3.7	2.7	.2	12.2
Curtis Perry	45	4	18.2	.453	.785	5.6	1.1	.8	.5	6.0
Alvin Scott	81	5	19.0	.488	.691	4.4	1.1	.6	.5	6.1
Paul Westphal	80	80	31.0	.516	.813	2.1	5.5	1.7	.4	25.2

=== Playoffs ===
Player	GP	GS	MPG	FG%	FT%	RPG	APG	SPG	BPG	PPG
Alvan Adams	2	2	35.5	.455	1.000	8.0	2.0	1.0	.5	16.0
Dennis Awtrey	2	0	12.0	.250	1.000	1.0	1.5	.5	.0	1.5
Mike Bratz	2	0	4.5	.200	.	0.0	0.5	.0	.0	1.0
Don Buse	2	2	38.0	.364	.	2.5	2.0	2.0	.0	4.0
Walter Davis	2	2	33.0	.475	.750	8.5	4.0	1.5	.0	25.0
Bayard Forrest	1	0	3.0	1.000	.	0.0	0.0	.0	.0	2.0
Greg Griffin	2	0	12.5	.429	.	2.0	1.5	.5	.5	3.0
Garfield Heard	2	2	31.0	.353	.500	8.0	2.5	1.0	2.0	6.5
Ron Lee	2	0	20.5	.313	1.000	3.0	1.5	2.0	.0	6.0
Alvin Scott	2	0	18.5	.500	.833	3.0	1.5	1.0	.0	6.5
Paul Westphal	2	2	33.0	.468	.889	3.0	9.5	.5	.0	26.0

== Transactions ==
=== Trades ===
July 15, 1977	To Portland Trail Blazers (United States) Dale Schlueter	To Phoenix Suns 1978 fourth-round draft pick ( (United States) Wayne Smith)
September 6, 1977	To Indiana Pacers (United States) Ricky Sobers	To Phoenix Suns (United States) Don Buse

=== Free agents ===
==== Additions ====
Date	Player	Contract	Old Team
July 23, 1977	Freeman Blade	Undisclosed	
February 16, 1978	Greg Griffin	Undisclosed	Phoenix Suns

==== Subtractions ====
Date	Player	Reason left	New team
April 10, 1977	Tom Van Arsdale	Retired	
May 12, 1977	Dick Van Arsdale	Retired	
June 6, 1977	Keith Erickson	Retired	
August 23, 1977	Billy McKinney	Waived	Kansas City Kings
October 17, 1977	Freeman Blade	Waived	
October 17, 1977	Butch Feher	Waived	
November 14, 1977	Greg Griffin	Waived	Phoenix Suns
