= 1977–78 Kansas City Kings season =

NBA team season

- Head coach: Phil Johnson, Larry Staverman
- Owners: Leon Karosen; Robert Margolin; H. Paul Rosenberg
- Arena: Kemper Arena; Omaha Civic Auditorium

Results
- Record: 31–51 (.378)
- Place: Division: 6th (Midwest); Conference: 11th (Western)
- Playoff finish: Did not qualify
- Stats at Basketball Reference

Local media
- Television: KBMA-TV
- Radio: KCMO

The 1977–78 Kansas City Kings season was their sixth season in Kansas City. The Kings had a losing record for the third consecutive season which resulted in missing the playoffs. The club started the season with 13 wins and 24 losses, which led to the dismissal of coach Phil Johnson. Under his replacement Larry Staverman the Kings would not play any better as they finished in last place with a 31–51 record.

== Draft picks ==
Round	Pick	Player	Position	Nationality	College
1	2	Otis Birdsong		United States	University of Houston
2	31	Eddie Owens		United States	University of Nevada Las Vegas
3	45	Bill Paterno		United States	Notre Dame
3	53	John Kuester		United States	University of North Carolina
4	75	Larry Williams		United States	Texas Southern University
5	97	Bob Chapman		United States	Michigan State University
7	139	Bruce Jenner		United States	Graceland College

== Roster ==
1977–78 Kansas City Kings roster
Players

Pos.	No.	Player	Height	Weight	DOB	From
G	42	Lucius Allen	6 ft 2 in (1.88 m)	175 lb (79 kg)		UCLA
G	10	Otis Birdsong	6 ft 3 in (1.91 m)	190 lb (86 kg)		Houston
G	24	Ron Boone	6 ft 2 in (1.88 m)	200 lb (91 kg)		Idaho State
C	16	Tom Burleson	7 ft 2 in (2.18 m)	225 lb (102 kg)		NC State
G	5	John Kuester	6 ft 2 in (1.88 m)	180 lb (82 kg)		North Carolina
C	44	Sam Lacey	6 ft 10 in (2.08 m)	235 lb (107 kg)		New Mexico State
F	55	Bob Nash	6 ft 8 in (2.03 m)	195 lb (88 kg)		Hawaiʻi
F	18	Kevin Restani	6 ft 9 in (2.06 m)	225 lb (102 kg)		San Francisco
F	52	Bill Robinzine	6 ft 7 in (2.01 m)	230 lb (104 kg)		DePaul
F	31	Richard Washington	6 ft 11 in (2.11 m)	220 lb (100 kg)		UCLA
F	15	Scott Wedman	6 ft 7 in (2.01 m)	215 lb (98 kg)		Colorado

Coaches
Head coach
- Larry Staverman
Assistant(s)
- Dan Sparks

Legend
- (DP) Unsigned draft pick
- (FA) Free agent
- (S) Suspended
- Injured

== Regular season ==
=== Season standings ===
Midwest Division	W	L	PCT	GB	Home	Road	Div
y-Denver Nuggets	48	34	.585	–	33–8	15–26	11–9
x-Milwaukee Bucks	44	38	.537	4	28–13	16–25	14–6
Chicago Bulls	40	42	.488	8	29–12	11–30	8–12
Detroit Pistons	38	44	.463	10	24–17	14–27	8–12
Indiana Pacers	31	51	.378	17	21–20	10–31	8–12
Kansas City Kings	31	51	.378	17	22–19	9–32	11–9

#	Western Conference				
#	Team	W	L	PCT	GB
1	z-Portland Trail Blazers	58	24	.707	–
2	y-Denver Nuggets	48	34	.585	10
3	x-Phoenix Suns	49	33	.598	9
4	x-Seattle SuperSonics	47	35	.573	11
5	x-Los Angeles Lakers	45	37	.549	13
6	x-Milwaukee Bucks	44	38	.537	14
7	Golden State Warriors	43	39	.524	15
8	Chicago Bulls	40	42	.488	18
9	Detroit Pistons	38	44	.463	20
10	Indiana Pacers	31	51	.378	27
11	Kansas City Kings	31	51	.378	27

== Game log ==
=== Regular season ===
1977–78 game log
Total: 31–51 (home: 22–19; road: 9–32)
October: 3–4 (home: 2–0; road: 1–4)

Game	Date	Team	Score	High points	High rebounds	High assists	Location Attendance	Record
1	October 18, 1977	@ New York	L 113–120				Madison Square Garden	0–1
2	October 19, 1977	@ Buffalo	L 108–112				Buffalo Memorial Auditorium	0–2
3	October 21, 1977	Houston	W 95–94				Kemper Arena	1–2
4	October 22, 1977	@ Indiana	L 101–106				Market Square Arena	1–3
5	October 25, 1977	@ Philadelphia	L 104–112				The Spectrum	1–4
6	October 27, 1977	@ Cleveland	W 119–104				Richfield Coliseum	2–4
7	October 29, 1977; 7:35 p.m. CDT	Washington	W 120–106				Kemper Arena; 9,220	3–4

November : 4–9 (home: 2–4; road: 2–5)

Game	Date	Team	Score	High points	High rebounds	High assists	Location Attendance	Record
8	November 1, 1977	@ Milwaukee	L 95–115				MECCA Arena	3–5
9	November 2, 1977	New Orleans	W 104–102				Kemper Arena	4–5
10	November 4, 1977	Atlanta	L 110–111				Kemper Arena	4–6
11	November 6, 1977	@ Seattle	W 99–83				Seattle Center Coliseum	5–6
12	November 8, 1977	@ Portland	L 104–130				Memorial Coliseum	5–7
13	November 11, 1977	@ Golden State	W 106–105				Oakland–Alameda County Coliseum Arena	6–7
14	November 12, 1977	@ Denver	L 114–119				McNichols Sports Arena	6–8
15	November 15, 1977	@ San Antonio	L 107–113				HemisFair Arena	6–9
16	November 19, 1977; 7:35 p.m. CST	Washington (at Omaha, Nebraska)	L 125–131 (OT)				Omaha Civic Auditorium; 6,534	6–10
17	November 23, 1977	Milwaukee	L 116–122				Kemper Arena	6–11
18	November 26, 1977	Boston	W 110–108				Kemper Arena	7–11
19	November 27, 1977	@ New Orleans	L 106–115				Louisiana Superdome	7–12
20	November 30, 1977	Seattle	L 84–86				Kemper Arena	7–13

December : 6–8 (home: 6–3; road: 0–5)

Game	Date	Team	Score	High points	High rebounds	High assists	Location Attendance	Record
21	December 2, 1977	Detroit	W 108–97				Kemper Arena	8–13
22	December 3, 1977	New Jersey (at Omaha, Nebraska)	W 118–115 (OT)				Omaha Civic Auditorium	9–13
23	December 6, 1977	Phoenix	L 92–103				Kemper Arena	9–14
24	December 7, 1977	@ Boston	L 109–113				Boston Garden	9–15
25	December 9, 1977	@ New Jersey	L 114–122				Rutgers Athletic Center	9–16
26	December 10, 1977	Golden State	L 92–97 (OT)				Kemper Arena	9–17
27	December 14, 1977	Denver	W 124–98				Kemper Arena	10–17
28	December 17, 1977	New Orleans (at Omaha, Nebraska)	W 115–93				Omaha Civic Auditorium	12–16
29	December 18, 1977	Indiana	W 115–114				Kemper Arena	12–17
30	December 22, 1977	Chicago	W 113–110				Kemper Arena	13–17
31	December 25, 1977	Milwaukee	L 122–131				Kemper Arena	13–18
32	December 26, 1977	@ Houston	L 99–113				The Summit	13–19
33	December 29, 1977	@ Phoenix	L 104–110				Arizona Veterans Memorial Coliseum	13–20
34	December 30, 1977	@ Los Angeles	L 109–119				The Forum	13–21

January : 3–10 (home: 2–5; road: 1–5)

Game	Date	Team	Score	High points	High rebounds	High assists	Location Attendance	Record
35	January 1, 1978	@ Portland	L 102–107				Memorial Coliseum	13–22
36	January 4, 1978	@ Seattle	L 110–116				Seattle Center Coliseum	13–23
37	January 7, 1978	New York	L 93–100				Kemper Arena	13–24
38	January 8, 1978	@ Milwaukee	L 123–133				MECCA Arena	13–25
39	January 10, 1978; 7:05 p.m. CST	@ Washington	L 115–123				Capital Centre; 7,700	13–26
40	January 11, 1978	Los Angeles	W 102–94				Kemper Arena	14–26
41	January 13, 1978	@ Indiana	L 106–108				Market Square Arena	14–27
42	January 14, 1978	Atlanta	W 110–101				Kemper Arena	15–27
43	January 17, 1978	@ Atlanta	L 90–111				The Omni	15–28
44	January 18, 1978	Philadelphia	L 106–126				Kemper Arena	15–29
45	January 22, 1978	@ New Jersey	W 105–97				Rutgers Athletic Center	16–29
46	January 24, 1978	Portland	L 97–120				Kemper Arena	16–30
47	January 26, 1978	@ New York	L 105–112				Madison Square Garden	16–31
48	January 27, 1978	@ New Orleans	L 117–134				Louisiana Superdome	16–32
49	January 29, 1978	San Antonio	L 113–127				Kemper Arena	16–33
50	January 31, 1978	Phoenix (at Omaha, Nebraska)	L 102–112				Omaha Civic Auditorium	16–34

February : 8–4 (home: 6–2; road: 2–2)

Game	Date	Team	Score	High points	High rebounds	High assists	Location Attendance	Record
51	February 2, 1978	Detroit	W 113–101				Kemper Arena	17–34
All-Star Break
52	February 8, 1978	Boston	W 104–100				Kemper Arena	18–34
53	February 10, 1978	Chicago	W 106–93				Kemper Arena	19–34
54	February 11, 1978	@ Chicago	W 95–90				Chicago Stadium	20–34
55	February 12, 1978	Cleveland	W 101–88				Kemper Arena	21–34
56	February 14, 1978	Houston	W 125–102				Kemper Arena	22–34
57	February 17, 1978	@ Buffalo	W 108–100				Buffalo Memorial Auditorium	23–34
58	February 18, 1978	@ Cleveland	L 101–105				Richfield Coliseum	23–35
59	February 19, 1978	@ Detroit	L 107–110				Cobo Arena	23–36
60	February 22, 1978	Los Angeles	W 127–122 (OT)				Kemper Arena	24–36
61	February 24, 1978	Portland	L 96–107				Kemper Arena	24–37
62	February 28, 1978	Seattle (at Omaha, Nebraska)	L 107–114 (OT)				Omaha Civic Auditorium	24–38

March : 7–8 (home: 4–3; road: 3–5)

Game	Date	Team	Score	High points	High rebounds	High assists	Location Attendance	Record
63	March 4, 1978	@ Denver	L 114–123				McNichols Sports Arena	24–39
64	March 6, 1978	Indiana	W 98–88				Kemper Arena	25–39
65	March 8, 1978	New Jersey	L 121–123				Kemper Arena	25–40
66	March 10, 1978	Denver	W 126–120				Kemper Arena	26–40
67	March 12, 1978	Golden State	L 106–113				Kemper Arena	26–41
68	March 17, 1978	@ Philadelphia	L 112–123				The Spectrum	26–42
69	March 18, 1978	@ Boston	L 110–117				Boston Garden	26–43
70	March 19, 1978	Buffalo	W 122–108				Kemper Arena	27–43
71	March 21, 1978	@ Detroit	W 116–111				Cobo Arena	28–43
72	March 22, 1978	Philadelphia	W 120–108				Kemper Arena	29–43
73	March 24, 1978	@ Houston	L 103–107				The Summit	29–44
74	March 25, 1978	San Antonio (at Omaha, Nebraska)	L 130–132				Omaha Civic Auditorium	29–45
75	March 28, 1978	@ Chicago	W 128–105				Chicago Stadium	30–45
76	March 29, 1978; 7:05 p.m. CST	@ Washington	W 108–105 (OT)				Capital Centre; 6,717	31–45
77	March 31, 1978	@ Phoenix	L 112–136				Arizona Veterans Memorial Coliseum	31–46

April : 0–5 (home: 0–2; road: 0–3)

Game	Date	Team	Score	High points	High rebounds	High assists	Location Attendance	Record
78	April 2, 1978	@ Los Angeles	L 127–133				The Forum	31–47
79	April 4, 1978	@ Golden State	L 119–130				Oakland–Alameda County Coliseum Arena	31–48
80	April 6, 1978	@ San Antonio	L 116–123				HemisFair Arena	31–49
81	April 7, 1978	New York	L 112–125				Kemper Arena	31–50
82	April 9, 1978	Cleveland	L 117–120				Kemper Arena	31–51

1977–78 schedule
