= 1977–78 Seattle SuperSonics season =

NBA professional basketball team season

- Conference champions
- Head coach: Bob Hopkins, Lenny Wilkens
- General manager: Zollie Volchok
- Owners: Sam Schulman
- Arena: Seattle Center Coliseum

Results
- Record: 47–35 (.573)
- Place: Division: 3rd (Pacific); Conference: 4th (Western)
- Playoff finish: NBA Finals (lost to Bullets 3–4)
- Stats at Basketball Reference

Local media
- Television: KIRO-TV 7 (Pete Gross, Gary Justice)
- Radio: KOMO–AM 1000 (Bob Blackburn)

The 1977–78 Seattle SuperSonics season was the 11th season of the franchise in the National Basketball Association (NBA). With a disappointing 5–17 start, the Sonics replaced coach Bob Hopkins with future Hall of Famer Lenny Wilkens, who led the team to a 47–35 finish. In the playoffs, the SuperSonics defeated the Los Angeles Lakers in three games in the First Round, then upset the defending NBA champions Portland Trail Blazers in six games in the Western Conference semifinals, before finally defeating the Denver Nuggets in six games in the conference finals, making their first trip to the NBA Finals in franchise history, where they lost the series to the Washington Bullets in 7 games.

== Offseason ==
=== Draft ===
Round	Pick	Player	Position	Nationality	College
1	8	Jack Sikma	C/PF	United States	Illinois Wesleyan
3	52	Joe Hassett	SG	United States	Providence
4	74	Jim Cooper	F	United States	Alabama State
5	96	Dale Haverman	F	United States	McKendree
6	118	Bucky O'Brien	G	United States	Seattle
7	138	Billy Reynolds	F	United States	Northwestern State
8	158	Jeff Frey	F	United States	Evansville

== Roster ==
1977–78 Seattle SuperSonics roster
Players

Pos.	No.	Player	Height	Weight	DOB	From
G	32	Fred Brown	6 ft 3 in (1.91 m)	182 lb (83 kg)	1948–08–07	Iowa
F	30	Al Fleming	6 ft 7 in (2.01 m)	215 lb (98 kg)	1954–04–05	Arizona
G	10	Joe Hassett	6 ft 5 in (1.96 m)	180 lb (82 kg)	1955–09–11	Providence
G	24	Dennis Johnson	6 ft 4 in (1.93 m)	185 lb (84 kg)	1954–09–18	Pepperdine
SF	27	John Johnson	6 ft 7 in (2.01 m)	200 lb (91 kg)	1947–10–18	Iowa
F	45	Bruce Seals	6 ft 8 in (2.03 m)	210 lb (95 kg)	1953–06–18	Xavier (LA)
F/C	43	Jack Sikma	6 ft 11 in (2.11 m)	230 lb (104 kg)	1955–11–14	Illinois Wesleyan
F/C	35	Paul Silas	6 ft 7 in (2.01 m)	220 lb (100 kg)	1943–07–12	Creighton
SF	42	Wally Walker	6 ft 7 in (2.01 m)	190 lb (86 kg)	1954–07–18	Virginia
C	40	Marvin Webster	7 ft 1 in (2.16 m)	225 lb (102 kg)	1952–04–13	Morgan State
PG	1	Gus Williams	6 ft 2 in (1.88 m)	175 lb (79 kg)	1953–10–10	USC

Coaches
Head coach
- (United States) Lenny Wilkens (Providence)

Legend
- (DP) Unsigned draft pick
- (FA) Free agent
- (S) Suspended
- Injured

== Standings ==
Pacific Division	W	L	PCT	GB	Home	Road	Div
y-Portland Trail Blazers	58	24	.707	–	36–5	22–19	13–3
x-Phoenix Suns	49	33	.598	9	34–7	15–26	8–8
x-Seattle SuperSonics	47	35	.573	11	31–10	16–25	8–8
x-Los Angeles Lakers	45	37	.549	13	29–12	16–25	6–10
Golden State Warriors	43	39	.524	15	30–11	13–28	5–11

#	Western Conference				
#	Team	W	L	PCT	GB
1	z-Portland Trail Blazers	58	24	.707	–
2	y-Denver Nuggets	48	34	.585	10
3	x-Phoenix Suns	49	33	.598	9
4	x-Seattle SuperSonics	47	35	.573	11
5	x-Los Angeles Lakers	45	37	.549	13
6	x-Milwaukee Bucks	44	38	.537	14
7	Golden State Warriors	43	39	.524	15
8	Chicago Bulls	40	42	.488	18
9	Detroit Pistons	38	44	.463	20
10	Indiana Pacers	31	51	.378	27
11	Kansas City Kings	31	51	.378	27

== Game log ==
=== Regular season ===
1977–78 game log
Total: 47–35 (home: 31–10; road: 16–25)
October: 1–6 (home: 1–2; road: 0–4)

Game	Date	Team	Score	High points	High rebounds	High assists	Location Attendance	Record
1	October 19	@ Golden State	L 84–116	Fred Brown 21			Oakland–Alameda County Coliseum Arena; 8,871	0–1
2	October 21	Portland	L 99–106	Bruce Seals (28)	Slick Watts (7)	Tied (5)	Seattle Center Coliseum; 12,156	0–2
3	October 23	San Antonio	L 94–112	Bruce Seals (19)	Mike Green (8)	Slick Watts (10)	Seattle Center Coliseum; 10,422	0–3
4	October 25	@ Phoenix	L 86–93	Bruce Seals (20)	Marvin Webster(11)	SlLick Watts (9)	Arizona Veterans Memorial Coliseum; 10,917	0–4
5	October 26	Buffalo	W 97–92	Fred Brown 37			Seattle Center Coliseum; 8,689	1–4
6	October 29	@ Chicago	L 97–101	Slick Watts 16			Chicago Stadium; 12,871	1–5
7	October 30	@ Milwaukee	L 95–108	Gus Williams (21)	Marvin Webster (15)	Paul Silas (6)	MECCA Arena; 10,107	1–6

November: 5–11 (home: 3–5; road: 2–6)

Game	Date	Team	Score	High points	High rebounds	High assists	Location Attendance	Record
8	November 1	@ Atlanta	L 99–102	Mike Green (17)	Marvin Webster (29)	Slick Watts (6)	The Omni; 7,782	1–7
9	November 2	@ Indiana	W 106–104 (OT)	Gus Williams 27			Market Square Arena; 11,753	2–7
10	November 4	New York	L 92–95	Fred Brown (31)	Marvin Webster (14)	Slick Watts (5)	Seattle Center Coliseum; 13,895	2–8
11	November 5	@ Portland	L 94–116	Marvin Webster (23)	Marvin Webster (19)	Gus Williams (4)	Memorial Coliseum; 12,666	2–9
12	November 6	Kansas City	L 83–99	Fred Brown 14			Seattle Center Coliseum; 11,276	2–10
13	November 11	Indiana	W 117–111	Fred Brown, Gus Williams 20			Seattle Center Coliseum; 9,349	3 10
14	November 13	New Orleans	W 117–83	Three players 20			Seattle Center Coliseum; 9,637	4–10
15	November 15	@ Washington	L 109–111	Gus Williams (23)	Marvin Webster (13)	Tied (3)	Capital Centre; 5,593	4–11
16	November 16	@ Philadelphia	L 96–101	Tied (17)	Marvin Webster (19)	Tied (5)	The Spectrum; 13,314	4–12
17	November 17	@ New Orleans	L 116–127	Slick Watts 18			Louisiana Superdome; 8,112	4–13
18	November 20	Cleveland	L 108–115	Fred Brown (31)	Jack Sikma (9)	Bruce Seals (3)	Seattle Center Coliseum; 10,005	4–14
19	November 23	Los Angeles	W 113–89	Fred Brown (21)	Marvin Webster (18)	Slick Watts (11)	Seattle Center Coliseum; 9,373	5–14
20	November 25	Chicago	L 89–106	Gus Williams 20			Seattle Center Coliseum; 9,384	5–15
21	November 27	New Jersey	L 96–99	Gus Williams 36			Seattle Center Coliseum; 9,475	5–16
22	November 29	@ Denver	L 99–115	Wally Walker (18)	Tied (8)	Slick Watts (7)	McNichols Sports Arena; 13,122	5–17
23	November 30	@ Kansas City	W 86–84	Gus Williams 24			Kemper Arena; 7,692	6–17

December: 11–3 (home: 7–1; road: 4–2)

Game	Date	Team	Score	High points	High rebounds	High assists	Location Attendance	Record
24	December 2	@ Boston	W 111–89	Dennis Johnson 24			Boston Garden; 11,101	7–17
25	December 3	@ Buffalo	W 102–95	Gus Williams 29			Buffalo Memorial Auditorium; 6,841	8–17
26	December 5	Atlanta	W 99–88	Gus Williams (26)	Marvin Webster (19)	Gus Williams (6)	Seattle Center Coliseum; 10,285	9–17
27	December 9	Milwaukee	W 136–123	Gus Williams (33)	Jack Sikma (17)	Gus Williams (9)	Seattle Center Coliseum; 12,946	10–17
28	December 11	Houston	W 116–84	Marvin Webster 17			Seattle Center Coliseum; 12,154	11–17
29	December 13	@ Cleveland	L 104–116	Fred Brown (23)	Marvin Webster (13)	Marvin Webster (7)	Richfield Coliseum; 6,666	11–18
30	December 14	@ Detroit	W 102–92	Gus Williams 37			Cobo Arena; 4,503	12–18
31	December 16	@ Los Angeles	W 98–90	Fred Brown (24)	Marvin Webster (21)	Gus Williams (7)	The Forum; 10,029	13–18
32	December 18	Washington	W 111–109 (OT)	Marvin Webster (21)	Marvin Webster (23)	Marvin Webster (7)	Seattle Center Coliseum; 13,563	14–18
33	December 20	Denver	W 93–88	Tied (18)	Marvin Webster (15)	John Johnson (6)	Seattle Center Coliseum; 11,825	15–18
34	December 22	Boston	W 132–99	Bruce Seals, Jack Sikma 21			Seattle Center Coliseum; 11,970	16–18
35	December 25	Los Angeles	L 96–111	John Johnson (22)	Marvin Webster (18)	Marvin Webster (6)	Seattle Center Coliseum; 14,096	16–19
36	December 27	@ Phoenix	L 105–131	Fred Brown (28)	Marvin Webster (9)	Marvin Webster (6)	Arizona Veterans Memorial Coliseum; 12,543	16–20
37	December 30	Phoenix	W 121–110	Dennis Johnson (24)	Marvin Webster (18)	Fred Brown (7)	Seattle Center Coliseum; 14,098	17–20

January: 10–2 (home: 8–1; road: 2–1)

Game	Date	Team	Score	High points	High rebounds	High assists	Location Attendance	Record
38	January 1	Chicago	W 114–96	Gus Williams 32			Seattle Center Coliseum; 11,419	18–20
39	January 4	Kansas City	W 116–110	Fred Brown 20			Seattle Center Coliseum; 9,979	19–20
40	January 8	Golden State	W 99–91	Marvin Webster 17			Seattle Center Coliseum; 14,098	20–20
41	January 11	Detroit	W 106–100	Marvin Webster 21			Seattle Center Coliseum; 10,127	21–20
42	January 13	Cleveland	W 104–98	Fred Brown (23)	Marvin Webster (14)	Marvin Webster (7)	Seattle Center Coliseum; 12,683	22–20
43	January 15	New York	W 108–102	Gus Williams (30)	Marvin Webster (14)	Tied (6)	Seattle Center Coliseum; 12,538	23–20
44	January 17	@ San Antonio	L 113–119	Jack Sikma (26)	Marvin Webster (14)	John Johnson (7)	HemisFair Arena; 8,677	23–21
45	January 18	@ Houston	W 106–104	Fred Brown 23			The Summit; 7,046	24–21
46	January 22	@ Boston	W 103–92	Gus Williams 29			Boston Garden; 12,058	25–21
47	January 25	Philadelphia	L 125–128	John Johnson (23)	Jack Sikma (15)	Tied (6)	Seattle Center Coliseum; 14,098	25–22
48	January 27	New Jersey	W 95–90	Fred Brown 25			Seattle Center Coliseum; 13,013	26–22
49	January 29	Milwaukee	W 103–101	Gus Williams (22)	Marvin Webster (11)	John Johnson (4)	Seattle Center Coliseum; 14,098	27–22

February: 7–5 (home: 3–1; road: 4–4)

Game	Date	Team	Score	High points	High rebounds	High assists	Location Attendance	Record
All-Star Game
50	February 8	Washington	L 100–106	Gus Williams (21)	Paul Silas (13)	Paul Silas (4)	Seattle Center Coliseum; 12,126	27–23
51	February 10	Denver	W 126–123 (OT)	Marvin Webster (26)	Marvin Webster (14)	Tied (4)	Seattle Center Coliseum; 13,795	28–23
52	February 12	@ Philadelphia	L 99–109	Gus Williams (28)	Marvin Webster (21)	Fred Brown (4)	The Spectrum; 16,101	28–24
53	February 14	@ Buffalo	L 100–101	Fred Brown 20			Buffalo Memorial Auditorium; 4,127	28–25
54	February 16	@ New Jersey	L 92–101	Gus Williams 24			Rutgers Athletic Center; 3,117	28–26
55	February 17	@ Chicago	W 106–98	Gus Williams 23			Chicago Stadium; 17,211	29–26
56	February 19	@ Milwaukee	W 108–103	Gus Williams (23)	Marvin Webster (14)	Paul Silas (5)	MECCA Arena; 10,938	30–26
57	February 21	@ New York	L 120–122	Gus Williams (24)	Marvin Webster (11)	John Johnson (7)	Madison Square Garden; 12,287	30–27
58	February 22	@ New Jersey	W 94–83	Gus Williams 31			Rutgers Athletic Center; 2,789	31–27
59	February 25	Detroit	W 118–104	Gus Williams 22			Seattle Center Coliseum; 14,098	32–27
60	February 26	Philadelphia	W 99–97	Fred Brown (32)	Marvin Webster (11)	Tied (4)	Seattle Center Coliseum; 14,098	33–27
61	February 28	@ Kansas City	W 114–107 (OT)	Gus Williams 27			Kemper Arena; 5,371	34–27

March: 9–7 (home: 5–0; road: 4–7)

Game	Date	Team	Score	High points	High rebounds	High assists	Location Attendance	Record
62	March 3	@ Indiana	L 111–115	Gus Williams 20			Market Square Arena; 10,087	34–28
63	March 4	@ New Orleans	L 104–113	Dennis Johnson 23			Louisiana Superdome; 16,232	34–29
64	March 5	@ Atlanta	L 94–101	Tied (20)	Marvin Webster (15)	Dennis Johnson (4)	The Omni; 3,018	34–30
65	March 8	@ San Antonio	W 95–94	Dennis Johnson (27)	Paul Silas (15)	Tied (4)	HemisFair Arena; 9,113	35–30
66	March 11	@ Houston	W 93–91	Fred Brown 25			The Summit; 7,144	36–30
67	March 14	@ Washington	L 115–120	Dennis Johnson (26)	Marvin Webster (13)	Gus Williams (6)	Capital Centre; 7,804	36–31
68	March 16	New Orleans	W 123–98	Gus Williams 19			Seattle Center Coliseum; 14,098	37–31
69	March 17	@ Los Angeles	W 105–98	Dennis Johnson (23)	Paul Silas (14)	Fred Brown (5)	The Forum; 12,997	38–31
70	March 19	San Antonio	W 116–98	Fred Brown (20)	Marvin Webster (19)	Wally Walker (5)	Seattle Center Coliseum; 14,098	39–31
71	March 21	@ Portland	L 96–102	John Johnson 26	Jack Sikma (13)	Gus Williams (6)	Memorial Coliseum; 12,666	39–32
72	March 22	Buffalo	W 97–92	Gus Williams 25			Seattle Center Coliseum; 13,179	40–32
73	March 24	Indiana	W 104–102	Jack Sikma 28			Seattle Center Coliseum; 14,098	41–32
74	March 26	Boston	W 112–101	Gus Williams 34			Seattle Center Coliseum; 14,098	42–32
75	March 28	@ Cleveland	L 100–112	Dennis Johnson (21}	Dennis Johnson (11)	Marvin Webster (5)	Richfield Coliseum; 9,765	42–33
76	March 29	@ Detroit	L 116–121	Gus Williams 32			Cobo Arena; 4,620	42–34
77	March 31	@ Denver	W 111–109	John Johnson (25)	Paul Silas (12)	Gus Williams (8)	McNichols Sports Arena; 17,270	43–34

April: 4–1 (home: 4–0; road: 0–1)

Game	Date	Team	Score	High points	High rebounds	High assists	Location Attendance	Record
78	April 2	Portland	W 101–86	Gus Williams (29)	Marvin Webster (13)	Tied (3)	Seattle Center Coliseum; 14,098	44–34
79	April 5	Houston	W 113–100	Gus Williams 22			Seattle Center Coliseum; 12,846	45–34
80	April 7	Phoenix	W 95–83	Fred Brown (16)	Tied (9)	Tied (6)	Seattle Center Coliseum; 14,098	46–34
81	April 8	@ Golden State	L 87–102	Gus Williams 20			Oakland–Alameda County Coliseum Arena; 13,327	46–35
82	April 9	Golden State	W 111–105	Fred Brown 24			Seattle Center Coliseum; 13,285	47–35

1977–78 schedule

=== Playoffs ===
1978 playoff game log
First Round: 2–1 (home: 2–0; road: 0–1)

Game	Date	Team	Score	High points	High rebounds	High assists	Location Attendance	Series
1	April 12	Los Angeles	W 102–90	Gus Williams (23)	Marvin Webster (14)	Fred Brown (5)	Seattle Center Coliseum; 14,098	1–0
2	April 14	@ Los Angeles	L 99–105	Dennis Johnson (21)	Marvin Webster (10)	Tied (4)	The Forum; 15,051	1–1
3	April 16	Los Angeles	W 111–102	Jack Sikma (24)	Marvin Webster (18)	Gus Williams (8)	Seattle Center Coliseum; 14,098	2–1

Conference Semifinals: 4–2 (home: 3–0; road: 1–2)

Game	Date	Team	Score	High points	High rebounds	High assists	Location Attendance	Series
1	April 18	@ Portland	W 104–95	Marvin Webster (24)	Jack Sikma (11)	Dennis Johnson (4)	Memorial Coliseum; 12,666	1–0
2	April 21	@ Portland	L 93–96	Gus Williams (31)	Marvin Webster (15)	Marvin Webster (7)	Memorial Coliseum; 12,666	1–1
3	April 23	Portland	W 99–84	Tied (18)	Marvin Webster (23)	Fred Brown (4)	Seattle Center Coliseum; 14,098	2–1
4	April 26	Portland	W 100–98	Jack Sikma (28)	Jack Sikma (10)	Dennis Johnson (8)	Seattle Center Coliseum; 14,098	3–1
5	April 30	@ Portland	L 89–113	Marvin Webster (16)	Paul Silas (10)	Gus Williams (4)	Memorial Coliseum; 12,666	3–2
6	May 1	Portland	W 105–94	Dennis Johnson (20)	Marvin Webster (11)	Gus Williams (7)	Seattle Center Coliseum; 14,098	4–2

Conference Finals: 4–2 (home: 3–0; road: 1–2)

Game	Date	Team	Score	High points	High rebounds	High assists	Location Attendance	Series
1	May 5	@ Denver	L 107–116	Marvin Webster (28)	Marvin Webster (16)	Gus Williams (8)	McNichols Sports Arena; 17,387	0–1
2	May 7	@ Denver	W 121–111	Fred Brown (26)	Paul Silas (12)	Fred Brown (6)	McNichols Sports Arena; 17,838	1–1
3	May 10	Denver	W 105–91	John Johnson (20)	Marvin Webster (16)	Tied (3)	Seattle Center Coliseum; 14,098	2–1
4	May 12	Denver	W 100–94	Dennis Johnson (31)	Paul Silas (14)	John Johnson (7)	Seattle Center Coliseum; 14,098	3–1
5	May 14	@ Denver	L 114–123	Gus Williams (31)	Marvin Webster (12)	Tied (6)	McNichols Sports Arena; 17,006	3–2
6	May 17	Denver	W 123–108	Fred Brown (26)	Paul Silas (13)	Dennis Johnson (7)	Seattle Center Coliseum; 14,098	4–2

NBA Finals: 3–4 (home: 2–2; road: 1–2)

Game	Date	Team	Score	High points	High rebounds	High assists	Location Attendance	Series
1	May 21	Washington	W 106–102	Fred Brown (30)	Marvin Webster (14)	Dennis Johnson (5)	Seattle Center Coliseum; 14,098	1–0
2	May 25	@ Washington	L 98–106	Gus Williams (24)	Marvin Webster (12)	Tied (4)	Capital Centre; 19,035	1–1
3	May 28	@ Washington	W 93–92	Tied (20)	Paul Silas (14)	Tied (2)	Capital Centre; 19,035	2–1
4	May 30	Washington	L 116–120 (OT)	Dennis Johnson (33)	Marvin Webster (15)	Paul Silas (6)	Kingdome; 39,457	2–2
5	June 2	Washington	W 98–94	Fred Brown (26)	Marvin Webster (13)	John Johnson (7)	Seattle Center Coliseum; 14,098	3–2
6	June 4	@ Washington	L 82–117	Fred Brown (17)	Marvin Webster (12)	Gus Williams (6)	Capital Centre; 19,035	3–3
7	June 7	Washington	L 99–105	Marvin Webster (27)	Marvin Webster (19)	Gus Williams (5)	Seattle Center Coliseum; 14,098	3–4

1978 schedule

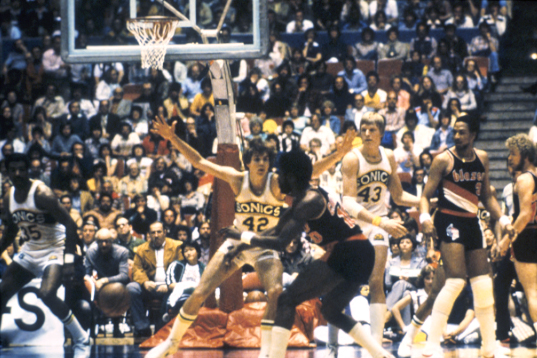
The Seattle SuperSonics playing the Portland Trail Blazers during the 1978 NBA playoffs.

== Awards and honors ==
- NBA All-Rookie First Team: Jack Sikma

== Player statistics ==
Legend
GP	Games played	RPG	Rebounds per game	BPG	Blocks per game
MIN	Minutes played	APG	Assists per game	TPG	Turnovers per game
PPG	Points per game	SPG	Steals per game	FPG	Field goals per game

=== Regular season ===
Player	GP	MIN	PPG	RPG	APG	SPG	BPG	TPG	FPG
Fred Brown	72	27.3	16.6	2.6	3.3	1.5	0.3	2.3	7.1
Al Fleming	20	4.9	2.0	1.5	0.4	0.0	0.3	0.8	0.8
Joe Hassett	48	8.4	4.0	0.8	0.9	0.4	0.0	0.7	1.9
Dennis Johnson	81	27.3	12.7	3.6	2.8	1.5	0.6	2.0	4.5
John Johnson	76	23.8	10.7	4.0	2.8	0.6	0.3	2.2	4.5
Bruce Seals	73	18.1	7.8	3.1	1.1	0.6	0.5	1.4	3.2
Jack Sikma	82	27.3	10.7	8.3	1.6	0.8	0.5	2.3	4.2
Paul Silas	82	26.5	5.8	8.1	1.8	0.8	0.2	1.9	2.2
Wally Walker	68	14.8	6.5	3.0	1.0	0.4	0.1	1.0	2.7
Marvin Webster	82	35.5	14.0	12.6	2.5	0.6	2.0	3.1	5.2
Gus Williams	79	32.6	18.1	3.2	3.7	2.3	0.5	2.4	7.6

=== Playoffs ===
Player	GP	MIN	PPG	RPG	APG	SPG	BPG	TPG	FPG
Fred Brown	22	26.1	17.3	2.1	2.4	1.0	0.1	1.4	7.0
Al Fleming	5	4.2	1.4	0.8	0.4	0.2	0.0	0.4	0.4
Joe Hassett	8	2.8	1.8	0.3	0.0	0.1	0.0	0.1	0.9
Dennis Johnson	22	37.6	16.1	4.6	3.3	1.0	1.0	2.5	5.5
John Johnson	22	27.1	10.1	4.5	2.5	0.4	0.3	2.4	4.3
Bruce Seals	9	10.2	3.0	2.2	0.9	0.2	0.2	0.7	1.3
Jack Sikma	22	31.9	13.7	8.1	1.2	0.8	0.5	1.6	5.2
Paul Silas	22	27.5	4.9	8.5	1.6	0.5	0.3	1.4	1.5
Wally Walker	20	13.1	4.7	1.9	0.6	0.4	0.2	0.9	1.8
Marvin Webster	22	41.1	16.1	13.1	2.6	0.3	2.6	3.4	6.2
Gus Williams	22	31.9	18.3	3.9	4.0	2.0	0.5	2.5	7.4
