= 1977–78 Denver Nuggets season =

NBA professional basketball team season

- Division champions
- Head coach: Larry Brown
- Arena: McNichols Sports Arena

Results
- Record: 48–34 (.585)
- Place: Division: 1st (Midwest); Conference: 2nd (Western)
- Playoff finish: West Conference finals (lost to SuperSonics 2–4)
- Stats at Basketball Reference

Local media
- Television: KWGN-TV
- Radio: KOA

The 1977–78 Denver Nuggets season was the Nuggets' 2nd season in the NBA and 11th season as a franchise.

In the playoffs, the Nuggets defeated the Milwaukee Bucks in seven games in the Semifinals, winning their first playoff series in the NBA, before losing to the Seattle SuperSonics in six games in the conference finals.

== Draft picks ==
Round	Pick	Player	Position	Nationality	School/Club team
1	9	Tom LaGarde	C	United States	North Carolina
1	21	Anthony Roberts	SF	United States	Oral Roberts
3	65	Robert Smith	PG	United States	Nevada-Las Vegas
5	109	John Billups		United States	Mississippi
6	130	Jim Town		United States	Massachusetts Amherst
7	150	Willie High		United States	Alabama State
8	169	Len Saunders		United States	Florida

== Roster ==
1977–78 Denver Nuggets roster
Players

Pos.	No.	Player	Height	Weight	DOB	From
PG	20	Mack Calvin	6 ft 0 in (1.83 m)	165 lb (75 kg)	1947–07–27	USC
F	55	Norm Cook	6 ft 8 in (2.03 m)	210 lb (95 kg)		Kansas
F	30	Jacky Dorsey	6 ft 7 in (2.01 m)	230 lb (104 kg)		Georgia
PF	31	Bo Ellis	6 ft 9 in (2.06 m)	197 lb (89 kg)		Marquette
F/C	30	Darnell Hillman	6 ft 9 in (2.06 m)	215 lb (98 kg)		San José State
C	44	Dan Issel	6 ft 9 in (2.06 m)	235 lb (107 kg)		Kentucky
PF	24	Bobby Jones	6 ft 9 in (2.06 m)	210 lb (95 kg)		North Carolina
C	45	Tom LaGarde	6 ft 10 in (2.08 m)	220 lb (100 kg)		North Carolina
PG	15	Jim Price	6 ft 1 in (1.85 m)	195 lb (88 kg)		Louisville
SF	21	Anthony Roberts	6 ft 5 in (1.96 m)	185 lb (84 kg)		Oral Roberts
G/F	10	Ralph Simpson	6 ft 5 in (1.96 m)	200 lb (91 kg)		Michigan State
PG	5	Robert Smith	5 ft 11 in (1.80 m)	165 lb (75 kg)		UNLV
PG	14	Brian Taylor	6 ft 2 in (1.88 m)	185 lb (84 kg)		Princeton
G/F	33	David Thompson	6 ft 4 in (1.93 m)	195 lb (88 kg)		NC State
G/F	32	Bob Wilkerson	6 ft 6 in (1.98 m)	195 lb (88 kg)		Indiana

Coaches
Head coach
- Larry Brown
Assistant(s)
- Donnie Walsh

Legend
- (DP) Unsigned draft pick
- (FA) Free agent
- (S) Suspended
- Injured

== Regular season ==
=== Season standings ===
Midwest Division	W	L	PCT	GB	Home	Road	Div
y-Denver Nuggets	48	34	.585	–	33–8	15–26	11–9
x-Milwaukee Bucks	44	38	.537	4	28–13	16–25	14–6
Chicago Bulls	40	42	.488	8	29–12	11–30	8–12
Detroit Pistons	38	44	.463	10	24–17	14–27	8–12
Indiana Pacers	31	51	.378	17	21–20	10–31	8–12
Kansas City Kings	31	51	.378	17	22–19	9–32	11–9

#	Western Conference				
#	Team	W	L	PCT	GB
1	z-Portland Trail Blazers	58	24	.707	–
2	y-Denver Nuggets	48	34	.585	10
3	x-Phoenix Suns	49	33	.598	9
4	x-Seattle SuperSonics	47	35	.573	11
5	x-Los Angeles Lakers	45	37	.549	13
6	x-Milwaukee Bucks	44	38	.537	14
7	Golden State Warriors	43	39	.524	15
8	Chicago Bulls	40	42	.488	18
9	Detroit Pistons	38	44	.463	20
10	Indiana Pacers	31	51	.378	27
11	Kansas City Kings	31	51	.378	27

z – clinched division title
y – clinched division title
x – clinched playoff spot

== Game log ==
=== Regular season ===
1977–78 game log
Total: 48–34 (home: 33–8; road: 15–26)
October: 4–2 (home: 4–0; road: 0–2)

Game	Date	Team	Score	High points	High rebounds	High assists	Location Attendance	Record

November: 10–6 (home: 6–0; road: 4–6)

Game	Date	Team	Score	High points	High rebounds	High assists	Location Attendance	Record
18	November 23	@ Atlanta	L 104–105				The Omni	12–6

December: 7–5 (home: 5–1; road: 2–4)

Game	Date	Team	Score	High points	High rebounds	High assists	Location Attendance	Record
25	December 7	Atlanta	W 123–116				McNichols Sports Arena	17–8
34	December 30	@ Atlanta	W 106–104				The Omni	21–13

January: 10–4 (home: 6–2; road: 4–2)

Game	Date	Team	Score	High points	High rebounds	High assists	Location Attendance	Record

February: 8–6 (home: 6–1; road: 2–5)

Game	Date	Team	Score	High points	High rebounds	High assists	Location Attendance	Record
All-Star Break
51	February 8	Atlanta	W 114–109				McNichols Sports Arena	33–18

March: 5–9 (home: 4–4; road: 1–5)

Game	Date	Team	Score	High points	High rebounds	High assists	Location Attendance	Record

April: 4–2 (home: 2–0; road: 2–2)

Game	Date	Team	Score	High points	High rebounds	High assists	Location Attendance	Record

1977–78 schedule

=== Playoffs ===
1978 playoff game log
Western Conference Semifinals: 4–3 (home: 3–1; road: 1–2)

Game	Date	Team	Score	High points	High rebounds	High assists	Location Attendance	Series
1	April 18	Milwaukee	W 119–103	David Thompson (27)	Dan Issel (12)	David Thompson (6)	McNichols Sports Arena; 17,297	1–0
2	April 21	Milwaukee	W 127–111	Dan Issel (22)	Dan Issel (14)	Issel, Calvin (6)	McNichols Sports Arena; 17,838	2–0
3	April 23	@ Milwaukee	L 112–143	three players tied (16)	Anthony Roberts (8)	David Thompson (5)	MECCA Arena; 10,938	2–1
4	April 25	@ Milwaukee	W 118–104	David Thompson (34)	Dan Issel (14)	Wilkerson, Sampson (5)	MECCA Arena; 10,938	3–1
5	April 28	Milwaukee	L 112–117	Bobby Jones (25)	Dan Issel (15)	Bob Wilkerson (8)	McNichols Sports Arena; 17,838	3–2
6	April 30	@ Milwaukee	L 91–119	David Thompson (28)	Bobby Jones (10)	Bob Wilkerson (6)	MECCA Arena; 10,938	3–3
7	May 3	Milwaukee	W 116–110	David Thompson (37)	Bob Wilkerson (12)	David Thompson (6)	McNichols Sports Arena; 17,838	4–3

Western Conference Finals: 2–4 (home: 2–1; road: 0–3)

Game	Date	Team	Score	High points	High rebounds	High assists	Location Attendance	Series
1	May 5	Seattle	W 116–107	Dan Issel (25)	Issel, Hillman (11)	Bob Wilkerson (10)	McNichols Sports Arena; 17,387	1–0
2	May 7	Seattle	L 111–121	Dan Issel (29)	Dan Issel (14)	Ralph Sampson (7)	McNichols Sports Arena; 17,838	1–1
3	May 10	@ Seattle	L 91–105	David Thompson (21)	Anthony Roberts (8)	Jones, Webster (3)	Seattle Center Coliseum; 14,098	1–2
4	May 12	@ Seattle	L 94–100	Dan Issel (27)	Darnell Hillman (11)	Bob Wilkerson (8)	Seattle Center Coliseum; 14,098	1–3
5	May 14	Seattle	W 123–114	David Thompson (35)	Bobby Jones (11)	Bob Wilkerson (10)	McNichols Sports Arena; 17,006	2–3
6	May 17	@ Seattle	L 108–123	David Thompson (21)	Anthony Roberts (16)	Bob Wilkerson (8)	Seattle Center Coliseum; 14,098	2–4

1978 schedule

== Awards and records ==
- David Thompson, All-NBA First Team
- Bobby Jones, NBA All-Defensive First Team
