= 1977–78 Portland Trail Blazers season =

NBA professional basketball team season

- Division champions
- Head coach: Jack Ramsay
- General manager: Harry Glickman
- Owner: Larry Weinberg
- Arena: Memorial Coliseum

Results
- Record: 58–24 (.707)
- Place: Division: 1st (Pacific); Conference: 1st (Western)
- Playoff finish: Conference semifinals (lost to SuperSonics 2–4)
- Stats at Basketball Reference

Local media
- Television: KOIN
- Radio: KYTE

The 1977–78 Portland Trail Blazers season was the eighth season of the Portland Trail Blazers in the National Basketball Association (NBA). Fresh off their first NBA Championship win the previous season, the Blazers led the league with a franchise-best 58–24 record, earning a first-round bye in the 1978 NBA Playoffs. However, they were defeated by the eventual Western Conference champion Seattle SuperSonics four games to two.

The team started with 50 wins in their first 60 games, but due to Bill Walton's foot injury they only managed to go 8–14 the rest of the way. This would be Walton's last season with the club, as he sat out the 1979 season and then was signed by the San Diego Clippers.

Prior to the season, the Blazers changed their uniforms to display blazing lines from side to side (red and black for the home, red and white for the road jersey). The team also changed the road jersey to be black rather than the red they previously wore since their inception (the team would wear black road uniforms until they changed it to red in 1979). The Blazers eventually eclipsed their franchise-record win total from this season with a 59–23 showing in 1989–90.

== Draft picks ==
Note: This is not a complete list; only the first two rounds are covered, as well as any other picks by the franchise who played at least one NBA game.

Round	Pick	Player	Position	Nationality	School/Club team
1	19	Rich Laurel	G	United States	Hofstra
2	28	Kim Anderson	F	United States	Missouri
2	41	T. R. Dunn	G	United States	Alabama

== Roster ==
1977–78 Portland Trail Blazers roster
Players

Pos.	No.	Player	Height	Weight	DOB	From
SF	10	Corky Calhoun	6 ft 7 in (2.01 m)	210 lb (95 kg)		Penn
G	16	Johnny Davis	6 ft 2 in (1.88 m)	170 lb (77 kg)		Dayton
SG	23	T.R. Dunn	6 ft 4 in (1.93 m)	192 lb (87 kg)		Alabama
F	30	Bob Gross	6 ft 6 in (1.98 m)	200 lb (91 kg)		Long Beach State
G	14	Lionel Hollins	6 ft 3 in (1.91 m)	185 lb (84 kg)		Arizona State
F	20	Maurice Lucas	6 ft 9 in (2.06 m)	215 lb (98 kg)		Marquette
F	36	Lloyd Neal	6 ft 7 in (2.01 m)	225 lb (102 kg)		Tennessee State
SF	24	Willie Norwood	6 ft 7 in (2.01 m)	220 lb (100 kg)		Alcorn State
F/C	25	Tom Owens	6 ft 10 in (2.08 m)	215 lb (98 kg)		South Carolina
F	15	Larry Steele	6 ft 5 in (1.96 m)	180 lb (82 kg)		Kentucky
G	13	Dave Twardzik	6 ft 1 in (1.85 m)	175 lb (79 kg)		Old Dominion
C	32	Bill Walton	6 ft 11 in (2.11 m)	210 lb (95 kg)		UCLA

Coaches
Head coach
- Jack Ramsay
Assistant(s)
- Jack McKinney

Legend
- (DP) Unsigned draft pick
- (FA) Free agent
- (S) Suspended
- Injured

== Regular season ==
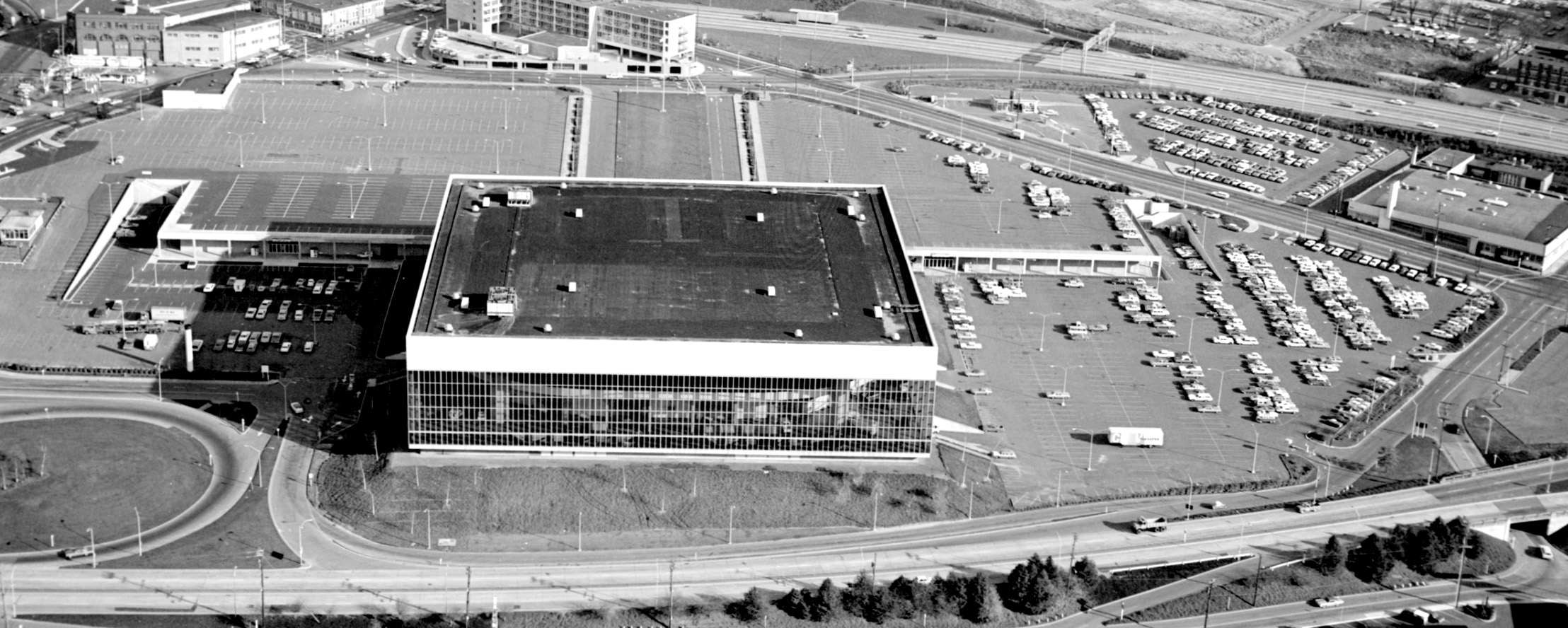
The Trail Blazers played their home games at Veterans Memorial Coliseum.

=== Season standings ===
Pacific Division	W	L	PCT	GB	Home	Road	Div
y-Portland Trail Blazers	58	24	.707	–	36–5	22–19	13–3
x-Phoenix Suns	49	33	.598	9	34–7	15–26	8–8
x-Seattle SuperSonics	47	35	.573	11	31–10	16–25	8–8
x-Los Angeles Lakers	45	37	.549	13	29–12	16–25	6–10
Golden State Warriors	43	39	.524	15	30–11	13–28	5–11

#	Western Conference				
#	Team	W	L	PCT	GB
1	z-Portland Trail Blazers	58	24	.707	–
2	y-Denver Nuggets	48	34	.585	10
3	x-Phoenix Suns	49	33	.598	9
4	x-Seattle SuperSonics	47	35	.573	11
5	x-Los Angeles Lakers	45	37	.549	13
6	x-Milwaukee Bucks	44	38	.537	14
7	Golden State Warriors	43	39	.524	15
8	Chicago Bulls	40	42	.488	18
9	Detroit Pistons	38	44	.463	20
10	Indiana Pacers	31	51	.378	27
11	Kansas City Kings	31	51	.378	27

z – clinched division title
y – clinched division title
x – clinched playoff spot

== Playoffs ==
1978 playoff game log
Conference Semi-finals: 2–4 (home: 2–1; road: 0–3)

Game	Date	Team	Score	High points	High rebounds	High assists	Location Attendance	Series
1	April 18	Seattle	L 95–104	Johnny Davis (20)	Bill Walton (16)	Lionel Hollins (9)	Memorial Coliseum; 12,666	0–1
2	April 21	Seattle	W 96–93	Maurice Lucas (19)	Maurice Lucas (14)	Lionel Hollins (5)	Memorial Coliseum; 12,666	1–1
3	April 23	@ Seattle	L 84–99	Tom Owens (24)	Owens, Lucas (9)	Dave Twardzik (5)	Seattle Center Coliseum; 14,098	1–2
4	April 26	@ Seattle	L 98–100	Lionel Hollins (35)	Maurice Lucas (16)	Tom Owens (8)	Seattle Center Coliseum; 14,098	1–3
5	April 30	Seattle	W 113–89	Tom Owens (31)	Maurice Lucas (13)	Davis, Owens (6)	Memorial Coliseum; 12,666	2–3
6	May 1	@ Seattle	L 94–105	Johnny Davis (23)	Maurice Lucas (12)	Lionel Hollins (9)	Seattle Center Coliseum; 14,098	2–4

1978 schedule

== Player statistics ==
Legend
GP	Games played	GS	Games started	MPG	Minutes per game
FG%	Field-goal percentage	3P%	3-point field-goal percentage	FT%	Free-throw percentage
RPG	Rebounds per game	APG	Assists per game	SPG	Steals per game
BPG	Blocks per game	PPG	Points per game

=== Season ===
Player	GP	GS	MPG	FG%	3FG%	FT%	RPG	APG	SPG	BPG	PPG

=== Playoffs ===
Player	GP	GS	MPG	FG%	3FG%	FT%	RPG	APG	SPG	BPG	PPG

== Awards and honors ==
- Bill Walton, NBA Most Valuable Player Award
- Bill Walton, All-NBA First Team
- Bill Walton, NBA All-Defensive First Team
- Bill Walton, NBA All-Star
- Maurice Lucas, NBA All-Defensive First Team
- Maurice Lucas, NBA All-Star
- Lionel Hollins, NBA All-Defensive First Team
- Lionel Hollins, NBA All-Star
- Bob Gross, NBA All-Defensive Second Team
