= Ron Lee =

American basketball player (born 1952)

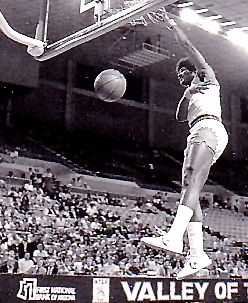
- Lee in 1977

Personal information
- Born: November 2, 1952 (age 74) Boston, Massachusetts, U.S.
- Listed height: 6 ft 4 in (1.93 m)
- Listed weight: 193 lb (88 kg)

Career information
- High school: Lexington (Lexington, Massachusetts)
- College: Oregon (1972–1976)
- NBA draft: 1976: 1st round, 10th overall pick
- Drafted by: Phoenix Suns
- Playing career: 1976–1986
- Position: Point guard
- Number: 30, 18, 44

Career history
- 1976–1979: Phoenix Suns
- 1979: New Orleans Jazz
- 1979–1980: Atlanta Hawks
- 1980–1982: Detroit Pistons
- 1983: Scavolini Pesaro
- 1985–1986: Alviks BK

Career highlights
- NBA All-Rookie First Team (1977); NBA steals leader (1978); Consensus second-team All-American (1975); Second-team All-American – AP (1976); Third-team All-American – NABC, UPI (1976); Pac-8 Player of the Year (1976); 4× First-team All-Pac-8 (1973–1976); No. 30 retired by Oregon Ducks; Second-team Parade All-American (1972)

Career NBA statistics
- Points: 3,285 (7.3 ppg)
- Rebounds: 1,219 (2.7 rpg)
- Assists: 1,688 (3.8 apg)
- Stats at NBA.com
- Stats at Basketball Reference

Ronald Henry Lee (born November 2, 1952) is an American former professional basketball player who played six seasons in the National Basketball Association (NBA). He played college basketball for the University of Oregon, and epitomized the "Kamikaze Kids" under coach Dick Harter with his all-out, fearless hustle and relentless desire to win. Born in Boston, Massachusetts, Lee played four seasons for the Ducks between 1972 and 1976. The Phoenix Suns made him the tenth selection in the NBA draft in 1976. Despite not playing football in high school and college, the NFL's San Diego Chargers also made him a 12th round selection in the 1976 NFL draft. In the NBA, Lee was named to the 1977 NBA All-Rookie Team and led the NBA in steals the following season.

Lee is still the all-time leading scorer for the University of Oregon with 2,085 points in his four seasons of play. He ranks second in career assists with 572, first in field goals (838), and fifth in free throws made (409). He was first-team All-Pac-8 in all four seasons with the Ducks, and made numerous All-American lists during his final three seasons. Lee was inducted into the Oregon Sports Hall of Fame in 1998.

After ending his NBA career, Lee played for 3 years in Italy.

== Personal life ==
Ron is younger brother of Russ Lee, former All-American basketball player at Marshall University and sixth overall pick in the 1972 NBA draft. Ron has another brother who played basketball at Marshall named Eugene. A third brother, Gerald Lee Sr., played at Dowling College and then professionally in Finland (all-time leading scorer in Finland pro basketball). His nephew is the Finnish international player Gerald Lee.

== Career statistics ==
Legend
GP	Games played	GS	Games started	MPG	Minutes per game
FG%	Field goal percentage	3P%	3-point field goal percentage	FT%	Free throw percentage
RPG	Rebounds per game	APG	Assists per game	SPG	Steals per game
BPG	Blocks per game	PPG	Points per game	**Bold**	Career high
*	Led the league

=== NBA ===
==== Regular season ====
Year	Team	GP	GS	MPG	FG%	3P%	FT%	RPG	APG	SPG	BPG	PPG
1976–77	Phoenix	**82**		22.5	.441		.676	**3.6**	3.2	1.9	**.4**	10.2
1977–78	Phoenix	**82**		23.5	.439		**.746**	3.1	3.7	**2.7***	.2	**12.2**
1978–79	Phoenix	43		22.0	**.452**		.712	2.6	3.1	1.6	.1	9.8
1978–79	New Orleans	17		23.4	.363		.649	3.2	4.3	2.2	.1	6.7
1979–80	Atlanta	30		12.1	.319	.000	.529	1.1	2.2	.5	.1	2.2
1979–80	Detroit	31		**25.9**	.393	**.393**	.660	2.9	**5.6**	**2.7**	**.4**	7.3
1980–81	Detroit	**82**		22.3	.350	.154	.724	2.7	4.4	2.0	**.4**	4.2
1981–82	Detroit	81	7	18.1	.358	.305	.706	1.9	3.9	1.4	.2	3.4
Career		448	7	21.4	.416	.321	.705	2.7	3.8	1.9	.3	7.3

==== Playoffs ====
Year	Team	GP	MPG	FG%	FT%	RPG	APG	SPG	BPG	PPG
1978	Phoenix	2	20.5	.313	1.000	3.0	1.5	2.0	.0	6.0

== See also ==
- List of National Basketball Association players with most steals in a game
