= Greg Griffin =

American basketball player

Personal information
- Born: September 6, 1952 (age 74) Cleveland, Ohio, U.S.
- Listed height: 6 ft 7 in (2.01 m)
- Listed weight: 190 lb (86 kg)

Career information
- College: Pasadena CC (1973–1975); Idaho State (1975–1977)
- NBA draft: 1977: 4th round, 71st overall pick
- Drafted by: Phoenix Suns
- Position: Small forward
- Number: 25

Career history
- 1977–1978: Phoenix Suns
- Stats at NBA.com
- Stats at Basketball Reference

Greg Griffin (born September 6, 1952, in Cleveland, Ohio) is an American former professional basketball small forward who spent one season in the National Basketball Association (NBA) as a member of the Phoenix Suns during the 1977–78 season. The Suns drafted Griffin from Idaho State University during the fourth round (71^{st} pick overall) of the 1977 NBA draft.

== Career statistics ==
Legend
GP	Games played	GS	Games started	MPG	Minutes per game
FG%	Field goal percentage	3P%	3-point field goal percentage	FT%	Free throw percentage
RPG	Rebounds per game	APG	Assists per game	SPG	Steals per game
BPG	Blocks per game	PPG	Points per game	**Bold**	Career high

=== NBA ===
==== Regular season ====
Year	Team	GP	MPG	FG%	FT%	RPG	APG	SPG	BPG	PPG
1977–78	Phoenix	36	11.7	.361	.639	2.9	.7	.4	.0	4.0

==== Playoffs ====
Year	Team	GP	MPG	FG%	FT%	RPG	APG	SPG	BPG	PPG
1978	Phoenix	2	12.5	.429	–	2.0	1.5	.5	.5	3.0
