= 1977–78 Milwaukee Bucks season =

NBA professional basketball team season

- Head coach: Don Nelson
- Arena: MECCA Arena

Results
- Record: 44–38 (.537)
- Place: Division: 2nd (Midwest); Conference: 6th (Western)
- Playoff finish: West Conference semifinals (lost to Nuggets 3–4)
- Stats at Basketball Reference

Local media
- Television: WVTV
- Radio: WTMJ

The 1977–78 Milwaukee Bucks season was the Bucks' tenth season in the NBA. The Bucks had drafted Marques Johnson from UCLA in the 1977 NBA draft.

== Draft picks ==
| Round | Pick | Player | Position | Nationality | College |
|---|---|---|---|---|---|
| 1 | 1 | Kent Benson | C | United States | Indiana |
| 1 | 3 | Marques Johnson | SF | United States | UCLA |
| 1 | 11 | Ernie Grunfeld | SG/SF | Romania; United States | Tennessee |
| 2 | 27 | Glen Williams | | United States | St. John's |
| 3 | 47 | Gary Yoder | SG | United States | Cincinnati |
| 4 | 69 | Lewis Brown | C | United States | Nevada-Las Vegas |
| 5 | 91 | Ron Norwood | | United States | DePaul |
| 6 | 113 | Chuck Goodyear | | United States | Miami |
| 7 | 134 | Ron Bostic | | United States | Detroit Mercy |
| 8 | 154 | Larry Pikes | | United States | Wisconsin-Milwaukee |

== Roster ==
1977–78 Milwaukee Bucks roster
Players

| Pos. | No. | Player | Height | Weight | DOB | From |
|---|---|---|---|---|---|---|
| C | 54 | Kent Benson | 6 ft 10 in (2.08 m) | 235 lb (107 kg) | 1954–12–27 | Indiana |
| SF | 2 | Junior Bridgeman | 6 ft 5 in (1.96 m) | 210 lb (95 kg) | 1953–09–17 | Louisville |
| PG | 21 | Quinn Buckner | 6 ft 3 in (1.91 m) | 190 lb (86 kg) | 1954–08–20 | Indiana |
| C | 51 | Jim Eakins | 6 ft 11 in (2.11 m) | 215 lb (98 kg) | 1946–05–24 | BYU |
| SF | 22 | Alex English | 6 ft 7 in (2.01 m) | 190 lb (86 kg) | 1954–01–05 | South Carolina |
| C | 40 | John Gianelli | 6 ft 10 in (2.08 m) | 220 lb (100 kg) | 1950–06–10 | Pacific |
| SG | 20 | Ernie Grunfeld | 6 ft 6 in (1.98 m) | 210 lb (95 kg) | 1955–04–24 | Tennessee |
| SF | 8 | Marques Johnson | 6 ft 7 in (2.01 m) | 218 lb (99 kg) | 1956–02–08 | UCLA |
| PF | 7 | Dave Meyers | 6 ft 8 in (2.03 m) | 215 lb (98 kg) | 1953–04–21 | UCLA |
| PG | 11 | Lloyd Walton | 6 ft 0 in (1.83 m) | 160 lb (73 kg) | 1953–11–23 | Marquette |
| SG | 32 | Brian Winters | 6 ft 4 in (1.93 m) | 185 lb (84 kg) | 1952–03–01 | South Carolina |

Coaches
Head coach
- Don Nelson
Assistant(s)
- John Killilea

Legend
- (DP) Unsigned draft pick
- (FA) Free agent
- (S) Suspended
- Injured

== Regular season ==
=== Season standings ===
| Midwest Division | W | L | PCT | GB | Home | Road | Div |
|---|---|---|---|---|---|---|---|
| y-Denver Nuggets | 48 | 34 | .585 | – | 33–8 | 15–26 | 11–9 |
| x-Milwaukee Bucks | 44 | 38 | .537 | 4 | 28–13 | 16–25 | 14–6 |
| Chicago Bulls | 40 | 42 | .488 | 8 | 29–12 | 11–30 | 8–12 |
| Detroit Pistons | 38 | 44 | .463 | 10 | 24–17 | 14–27 | 8–12 |
| Indiana Pacers | 31 | 51 | .378 | 17 | 21–20 | 10–31 | 8–12 |
| Kansas City Kings | 31 | 51 | .378 | 17 | 22–19 | 9–32 | 11–9 |

| # | Western Conference | | | | |
| # | Team | W | L | PCT | GB |
|---|---|---|---|---|---|
| 1 | z-Portland Trail Blazers | 58 | 24 | .707 | – |
| 2 | y-Denver Nuggets | 48 | 34 | .585 | 10 |
| 3 | x-Phoenix Suns | 49 | 33 | .598 | 9 |
| 4 | x-Seattle SuperSonics | 47 | 35 | .573 | 11 |
| 5 | x-Los Angeles Lakers | 45 | 37 | .549 | 13 |
| 6 | x-Milwaukee Bucks | 44 | 38 | .537 | 14 |
| 7 | Golden State Warriors | 43 | 39 | .524 | 15 |
| 8 | Chicago Bulls | 40 | 42 | .488 | 18 |
| 9 | Detroit Pistons | 38 | 44 | .463 | 20 |
| 10 | Indiana Pacers | 31 | 51 | .378 | 27 |
| 11 | Kansas City Kings | 31 | 51 | .378 | 27 |

z – clinched division title
y – clinched division title
x – clinched playoff spot

=== Game log ===
1977–78 game log
Total: 44–38 (home: 28–13; road: 16–25)
October: 3–2 (home: 3–0; road: 0–2)

| Game | Date | Team | Score | High points | High rebounds | High assists | Location Attendance | Record |
|---|---|---|---|---|---|---|---|---|
| 1 | October 18, 1977 | Los Angeles | W 117–112 | Brian Winters (26) | Marques Johnson (12) | Lloyd Walton (6) | MECCA Arena | 1–0 |
| 2 | October 19, 1977 | @ Denver | L 115–133 | Marques Johnson (22) | Marques Johnson (11) | Quinn Buckner (7) | McNichols Sports Arena | 1—1 |
| 3 | October 22, 1977 | Chicago | W 113–95 | Junior Bridgeman (24) | Marques Johnson (11) | Quinn Buckner (7) | MECCA Arena | 2–1 |
| 4 | October 27, 1977 | @ Houston | L 110–133 | Brian Winters (29) | Marques Johnson (9) | Ernie Grunfeld, Dave Meyers (4) | The Summit | 2—2 |
| 5 | October 30, 1977 | Seattle | W 108–95 | Dave Meyers (23) | Marques Johnson (12) | Quinn Buckner (12) | MECCA Arena | 3–2 |

November: 8–8 (home: 3–5; road: 5–3)

| Game | Date | Team | Score | High points | High rebounds | High assists | Location Attendance | Record |
|---|---|---|---|---|---|---|---|---|
| 6 | November 1, 1977 | Kansas City | W 115–95 | Junior Bridgeman (23) | Alex English, Dave Meyers (7) | Quinn Buckner (15) | MECCA Arena | 4–2 |
| 7 | November 3, 1977 | @ Cleveland | L 91—100 | | | | Coliseum at Richfield | 4–3 |
| 8 | November 4, 1977 | Houston | W 110–108 | | | | MECCA Arena | 5–3 |
| 9 | November 8, 1977 | Denver | L 101–111 | | | | MECCA Arena | 5–4 |
| 10 | November 10, 1977 | @ Washington | W 106–103 | | | | Capital Centre | 6–4 |
| 11 | November 11, 1977 | Cleveland | L 82–88 | | | | MECCA Arena | 6–5 |
| 12 | November 13, 1977 | Boston | L 119–127 | | | | MECCA Arena | 6–6 |
| 13 | November 15, 1977 | Portland | L 106–109 | | | | MECCA Arena | 6–7 |
| 14 | November 16, 1977 | @ New Jersey | W 116–106 | | | | Rutgers Athletic Center | 7–7 |
| 15 | November 19, 1977 | @ Philadelphia | L 100–111 | | | | The Spectrum | 7–8 |
| 16 | November 22, 1977 | Golden State | W 109–88 | | | | MECCA Arena | 8–8 |
| 17 | November 23, 1977 | @ Kansas City | W 122–116 | | | | Kemper Arena | 9–8 |
| 18 | November 25, 1977 | @ Atlanta | W 117–115 | | | | Omni Coliseum | 10–8 |
| 19 | November 26, 1977 | @ San Antonio | L 107–129 | | | | HemisFair Arena | 10–9 |
| 20 | November 29, 1977 | Detroit | L 99–100 | | | | MECCA Arena | 10–10 |
| 21 | November 30, 1977 | @ Indiana | W 120–113 | | | | Market Square Arena | 11–10 |

December: 9–7 (home: 5–3; road: 4–4)

| Game | Date | Team | Score | High points | High rebounds | High assists | Location Attendance | Record |
|---|---|---|---|---|---|---|---|---|
| 22 | December 2, 1977 | Washington | L 95–108 | | | | MECCA Arena | 11–11 |
| 23 | December 3, 1977 | @ New York | W 115–108 | | | | Madison Square Garden | 12–11 |
| 24 | December 4, 1977 | New Jersey | W 134–118 OT | | | | MECCA Arena | 13–11 |
| 25 | December 6, 1977 | @ Los Angeles | L 108–109 | | | | The Forum | 13–12 |
| 26 | December 8, 1977 | @ Golden State | W 117–116 | | | | Oakland-Alameda County Coliseum Arena | 14–12 |
| 27 | December 9, 1977 | @ Seattle | L 123–136 | | | | Seattle Center Coliseum | 14–13 |
| 28 | December 10, 1977 | @ Denver | L 111–118 | | | | McNichols Sports Arena | 14–14 |
| 29 | December 13, 1977 | Philadelphia | W 129–117 | | | | MECCA Arena | 15–14 |
| 30 | December 16, 1977 | New York | W 152–150 3OT | | | | MECCA Arena | 16–14 |
| 31 | December 18, 1977 | Buffalo | W 111–100 | | | | MECCA Arena | 17–14 |
| 32 | December 21, 1977 | San Antonio | W 116–92 | | | | MECCA Arena | 18–14 |
| 33 | December 22, 1977 | @ Detroit | L 102–118 | | | | Cobo Arena | 18–15 |
| 34 | December 23, 1977 | Atlanta | L 93–109 | | | | MECCA Arena | 18–16 |
| 35 | December 25, 1977 | @ Kansas City | W 131–122 | | | | Kemper Arena | 19–16 |
| 36 | December 27, 1977 | @ Buffalo | W 108–105 | | | | Buffalo Memorial Auditorium | 20–16 |
| 37 | December 29, 1977 | Boston | L 115–129 | | | | MECCA Arena | 20–17 |

January: 6–8 (home: 5–2; road: 1–6)

| Game | Date | Team | Score | High points | High rebounds | High assists | Location Attendance | Record |
|---|---|---|---|---|---|---|---|---|
| 38 | January 3, 1978 | Phoenix | L 103–125 | | | | MECCA Arena | 20–18 |
| 39 | January 5, 1978 | New Orleans | L 109–116 | | | | MECCA Arena | 20–19 |
| 40 | January 6, 1978 | @ Houston | W 103–101 | | | | The Summit | 21–19 |
| 41 | January 8, 1978 | Kansas City | W 133–123 | | | | MECCA Arena | 22–19 |
| 42 | January 10, 1978 | Indiana | W 125–103 | | | | MECCA Arena | 23–19 |
| 43 | January 11, 1978 | @ San Antonio | L 106–130 | | | | HemisFair Arena | 23–20 |
| 44 | January 13, 1978 | @ Chicago | L 111–128 | | | | Chicago Stadium | 23–21 |
| 45 | January 17, 1978 | New Jersey | W 119–109 | | | | MECCA Arena | 24–21 |
| 46 | January 18, 1978 | @ Boston | L 116–130 | | | | Boston Garden | 24–22 |
| 47 | January 19, 1978 | Denver | W 114–109 | | | | MECCA Arena | 25–22 |
| 48 | January 22, 1978 | Chicago | W 112–90 | | | | MECCA Arena | 26–22 |
| 49 | January 27, 1978 | @ Los Angeles | L 114–131 | | | | The Forum | 26–23 |
| 50 | January 29, 1978 | @ Seattle | L 101–103 | | | | Seattle Center Coliseum | 26–24 |
| 51 | January 31, 1978 | @ Portland | L 116–136 | | | | Memorial Coliseum | 26–25 |

February: 1–0 (home: 1–0; road: 0–0)

| Game | Date | Team | Score | High points | High rebounds | High assists | Location Attendance | Record |
|---|---|---|---|---|---|---|---|---|
| 52 | February 2, 1978 | @ Golden State | L 116–136 | | | | Oakland-Alameda County Coliseum Arena | 26–26 |
| 53 | February 3, 1978 | @ Phoenix | L 105–115 | | | | Arizona Veterans Memorial Coliseum | 26–27 |
| 54 | February 8, 1978 | Buffalo | W 104–103 | | | | MECCA Arena | 27–27 |
| 55 | February 10, 1978 | Cleveland | W 108–98 | | | | MECCA Arena | 28–27 |
| 56 | February 11, 1978 | @ New York | L 122–133 | | | | Madison Square Garden | 28–28 |
| 57 | February 15, 1978 | New Orleans | W 112–99 | | | | MECCA Arena | 29–28 |

March: 0–0 (home: 0–0; road: 0–0)

| Game | Date | Team | Score | High points | High rebounds | High assists | Location Attendance | Record |

April: 0–0 (home: 0–0; road: 0–0)

| Game | Date | Team | Score | High points | High rebounds | High assists | Location Attendance | Record |

1977–78 schedule

== Playoffs ==
1978 playoff game log
First Round: 2–0 (home: 1–0; road: 1–0)

| Game | Date | Team | Score | High points | High rebounds | High assists | Location Attendance | Series |
|---|---|---|---|---|---|---|---|---|
| 1 | April 11 | @ Phoenix | W 111–103 | Brian Winters (31) | Marques Johnson (16) | Quinn Buckner (8) | Arizona Veterans Memorial Coliseum; 12,161 | 1–0 |
| 2 | April 14 | Phoenix | W 94–90 | Marques Johnson (33) | Dave Meyers (14) | Quinn Buckner (10) | MECCA Arena; 10,938 | 2–0 |

Conference semifinals: 3–4 (home: 2–1; road: 1–3)

| Game | Date | Team | Score | High points | High rebounds | High assists | Location Attendance | Series |
|---|---|---|---|---|---|---|---|---|
| 1 | April 18 | @ Denver | L 103–119 | Alex English (26) | Dave Meyers (15) | Brian Winters (11) | McNichols Sports Arena; 17,297 | 0–1 |
| 2 | April 21 | @ Denver | L 111–127 | Marques Johnson (22) | Johnson, Meyers (5) | Lloyd Walton (8) | McNichols Sports Arena; 17,838 | 0–2 |
| 3 | April 23 | Denver | W 143–112 | Marques Johnson (35) | Marques Johnson (10) | Lloyd Walton (11) | MECCA Arena; 10,938 | 1–2 |
| 4 | April 25 | Denver | L 104–118 | Johnson, Winters (14) | Marques Johnson (7) | Brian Winters (6) | MECCA Arena; 10,938 | 1–3 |
| 5 | April 28 | @ Denver | W 117–112 | Marques Johnson (34) | Marques Johnson (17) | Winters, Buckner (9) | McNichols Sports Arena; 17,838 | 2–3 |
| 6 | April 30 | Denver | W 119–91 | Alex English (21) | Marques Johnson (17) | Marques Johnson (9) | MECCA Arena; 10,938 | 3–3 |
| 7 | May 3 | @ Denver | L 110–116 | Brian Winters (27) | Marques Johnson (16) | Quinn Buckner (10) | McNichols Sports Arena; 17,838 | 3–4 |

1978 schedule

== Player statistics ==
Legend
| GP | Games played | GS | Games started | MPG | Minutes per game |
| FG% | Field-goal percentage | 3P% | 3-point field-goal percentage | FT% | Free-throw percentage |
| RPG | Rebounds per game | APG | Assists per game | SPG | Steals per game |
| BPG | Blocks per game | PPG | Points per game |

=== Season ===
Season
| Player | GP | GS | MPG | FG% | 3FG% | FT% | RPG | APG | SPG | BPG | PPG |
|---|---|---|---|---|---|---|---|---|---|---|---|
| Brian Winters | 80 | | 34.4 | 46.3 | | 84.0 | 3.1 | 4.9 | 1.6 | 0.3 | 19.9 |
| Marques Johnson | 80 | | 34.6 | 52.2 | | 73.6 | 10.6 | 2.4 | 1.2 | 1.3 | 19.5 |
| Dave Meyers | 80 | | 30.2 | 46.1 | | 72.2 | 6.7 | 3.0 | 1.1 | 0.6 | 14.7 |
| Junior Bridgeman | 82 | | 22.9 | 50.3 | | 81.0 | 3.5 | 2.1 | 0.9 | 0.4 | 13.6 |
| Alex English | 82 | | 18.9 | 54.2 | | 72.7 | 4.8 | 1.6 | 0.5 | 0.7 | 9.6 |
| Quinn Buckner | 82 | | 25.3 | 46.8 | | 64.5 | 3.0 | 5.6 | 2.3 | 0.2 | 9.3 |
| John Gianelli | 82 | | 28.4 | 48.8 | | 64.2 | 6.2 | 2.3 | 0.7 | 1.1 | 8.5 |
| Kent Benson | 69 | | 18.7 | 46.5 | | 65.2 | 4.3 | 1.4 | 1.0 | 0.8 | 7.7 |
| Ernie Grunfeld | 73 | | 17.3 | 44.3 | | 65.7 | 2.7 | 2.0 | 0.7 | 0.3 | 6.9 |
| Lloyd Walton | 76 | | 16.6 | 44.8 | | 65.1 | 1.0 | 3.3 | 1.0 | 0.2 | 4.8 |
| Kevin Restani | 8 | | 10.5 | 46.4 | | 0.0 | 1.8 | 1.1 | 0.0 | 0.1 | 3.3 |
| Jim Eakins | 17 | | 9.1 | 41.2 | | 80.8 | 1.7 | 0.7 | 0.2 | 0.4 | 2.9 |
| Rich Laurel | 10 | | 5.7 | 32.3 | | 100.0 | 1.0 | 0.3 | 0.3 | 0.1 | 2.4 |
| Scott Lloyd | 14 | | 8.0 | 36.4 | | 60.0 | 1.9 | 0.6 | 0.2 | 0.4 | 2.1 |

=== Playoffs ===
Playoffs
| Player | GP | GS | MPG | FG% | 3FG% | FT% | RPG | APG | SPG | BPG | PPG |
|---|---|---|---|---|---|---|---|---|---|---|---|
| Marques Johnson | 9 | | 35.7 | 54.9 | | 75.0 | 12.4 | 3.4 | 1.1 | 1.9 | 24.0 |
| Brian Winters | 9 | | 33.9 | 49.7 | | 74.1 | 3.3 | 6.4 | 1.3 | 0.9 | 20.4 |
| Alex English | 9 | | 23.1 | 61.5 | | 78.1 | 4.7 | 1.4 | 0.7 | 0.8 | 13.4 |
| Dave Meyers | 9 | | 31.0 | 44.4 | | 66.7 | 8.2 | 3.9 | 0.8 | 1.2 | 12.9 |
| Quinn Buckner | 9 | | 28.6 | 50.0 | | 65.2 | 3.0 | 6.9 | 2.0 | 0.1 | 11.2 |
| Junior Bridgeman | 9 | | 19.8 | 48.4 | | 75.0 | 2.0 | 1.2 | 1.0 | 0.2 | 10.4 |
| John Gianelli | 9 | | 32.2 | 42.4 | | 76.9 | 6.4 | 1.6 | 0.9 | 1.2 | 7.8 |
| Ernie Grunfeld | 7 | | 11.0 | 53.1 | | 80.0 | 1.6 | 2.4 | 0.4 | 0.1 | 5.4 |
| Lloyd Walton | 9 | | 13.8 | 48.6 | | 61.5 | 0.4 | 4.1 | 0.9 | 0.3 | 4.7 |
| Kent Benson | 9 | | 11.4 | 47.8 | | 54.5 | 1.7 | 0.3 | 0.6 | 0.3 | 3.1 |
| Jim Eakins | 3 | | 6.0 | 20.0 | | 0.0 | 0.3 | 0.3 | 0.3 | 0.0 | 0.7 |

== Awards and records ==
- Quinn Buckner, NBA All-Defensive Second Team
- Marques Johnson, NBA All-Rookie Team 1st Team
- On Friday, November 25, 1977, the day after Thanksgiving, and on the road, the Bucks overcame the largest 4th quarter deficit in NBA history, defeating the Atlanta Hawks after being down by 29 points with only 8:43 left in the game. Atlanta led 111–82 before Milwaukee went on a 35–4 run to win 117–115 in regulation. This record was set without the use of the three-point field goal, since its NBA inception was not until the 1979–80 season.

== Transactions ==
=== Trades ===
June 7, 1977

September 2, 1977

To Milwaukee Bucks----
- 1977 1st round pick (Marques Johnson)
To Milwaukee Bucks----
- John Gianelli
To Buffalo Braves----
- Swen Nater
- 1977 1st round pick
To Buffalo Braves----
- 1979 1st round draft pick (Roy Hamilton)

=== Free agents ===
| Player | Signed | Former team |
| Jim Eakins | January 13, 1978 | San Antonio Spurs |
