= 1977–78 Los Angeles Lakers season =

Season of National Basketball Association team the Los Angeles Lakers

- Head coach: Jerry West
- General manager: Bill Sharman
- Owner: Jack Kent Cooke
- Arena: The Forum

Results
- Record: 45–37 (.549)
- Place: Division: 4th (Pacific); Conference: 5th (Western)
- Playoff finish: First round (lost to SuperSonics 1–2)
- Stats at Basketball Reference

Local media
- Television: KHJ-TV (Chick Hearn, Pat Riley)
- Radio: KLAC (Chick Hearn, Pat Riley)

The 1977–78 Los Angeles Lakers season was the Lakers' 30th season in the NBA and 18th season in Los Angeles.

This season was defined by the December 9 punch that Kermit Washington laid on Rudy Tomjanovich during a Lakers vs. Rockets game, which received national attention. The violent moment would permanently alter Washington's and Tomjanovich's playing careers.

The Lakers won 45 games, an eight-game decline from their Pacific Division-winning ballclub of the year prior. They would be defeated 2-1 in the first round by their division foes, the Seattle SuperSonics, who went on to the NBA Finals.

== Roster ==
1977–78 Los Angeles Lakers roster
Players

Pos.	No.	Player	Height	Weight	DOB	From
C	33	Kareem Abdul-Jabbar	7 ft 2 in (2.18 m)	225 lb (102 kg)	1947-04-16	UCLA
SF	5	Tom Abernethy	6 ft 7 in (2.01 m)	220 lb (100 kg)	1954-05-06	Indiana
PF	2	Kenny Carr	6 ft 7 in (2.01 m)	220 lb (100 kg)	1955-08-15	NC State
SF	4	Adrian Dantley	6 ft 5 in (1.96 m)	208 lb (94 kg)	1955-02-28	Notre Dame
PG	30	Brad Davis	6 ft 3 in (1.91 m)	180 lb (82 kg)	1955-12-17	Maryland
PF	35	Don Ford	6 ft 9 in (2.06 m)	215 lb (98 kg)	1952-12-31	UC Santa Barbara
SG	23	Lou Hudson	6 ft 5 in (1.96 m)	210 lb (95 kg)	1944-07-11	Minnesota
PG	10	Norm Nixon	6 ft 2 in (1.88 m)	170 lb (77 kg)	1955-10-11	Duquesne
C	40	Dave Robisch	6 ft 10 in (2.08 m)	235 lb (107 kg)	1949-12-22	Kansas
SG	11	Charlie Scott	6 ft 5 in (1.96 m)	175 lb (79 kg)	1948-12-15	North Carolina
SF	52	Jamaal Wilkes	6 ft 6 in (1.98 m)	190 lb (86 kg)	1953-05-02	UCLA

Coaches
Head coach
- Jerry West
Assistant(s)
- Stan Albeck
- Jack McCloskey

Legend
- (DP) Unsigned draft pick
- (FA) Free agent
- (S) Suspended
- Injured

Roster
Updated: January 30, 1978

== Regular season ==
=== Season standings ===
Pacific Division	W	L	PCT	GB	Home	Road	Div
y-Portland Trail Blazers	58	24	.707	–	36–5	22–19	13–3
x-Phoenix Suns	49	33	.598	9	34–7	15–26	8–8
x-Seattle SuperSonics	47	35	.573	11	31–10	16–25	8–8
x-Los Angeles Lakers	45	37	.549	13	29–12	16–25	6–10
Golden State Warriors	43	39	.524	15	30–11	13–28	5–11

#	Western Conference				
#	Team	W	L	PCT	GB
1	z-Portland Trail Blazers	58	24	.707	–
2	y-Denver Nuggets	48	34	.585	10
3	x-Phoenix Suns	49	33	.598	9
4	x-Seattle SuperSonics	47	35	.573	11
5	x-Los Angeles Lakers	45	37	.549	13
6	x-Milwaukee Bucks	44	38	.537	14
7	Golden State Warriors	43	39	.524	15
8	Chicago Bulls	40	42	.488	18
9	Detroit Pistons	38	44	.463	20
10	Indiana Pacers	31	51	.378	27
11	Kansas City Kings	31	51	.378	27

z – clinched division title
y – clinched division title
x – clinched playoff spot

== Playoffs ==
1978 playoff game log
First Round: 1–2 (home: 1–0; road: 0–2)

Game	Date	Team	Score	High points	High rebounds	High assists	Location Attendance	Series
1	April 12	@ Seattle	L 90–102	Kareem Abdul-Jabbar (26)	Kareem Abdul-Jabbar (12)	Nixon, Scott (6)	Seattle Center Coliseum; 14,098	0–1
2	April 14	Seattle	W 105–99	Kareem Abdul-Jabbar (24)	Kareem Abdul-Jabbar (18)	Adrian Dantley (6)	The Forum; 15,051	1–1
3	April 16	@ Seattle	L 102–111	Kareem Abdul-Jabbar (31)	Kareem Abdul-Jabbar (11)	Norm Nixon (5)	Seattle Center Coliseum; 14,098	1–2

1978 schedule

== Awards and records ==
- Kareem Abdul-Jabbar, All-NBA Second Team
- Kareem Abdul-Jabbar, NBA All-Defensive Second Team
- Norm Nixon, NBA All-Rookie Team 1st Team
