= Walter Davis (basketball) =

American basketball player (1954–2023)

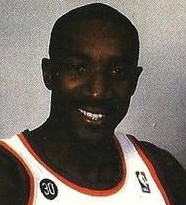
- Davis in 1987

Personal information
- Born: September 9, 1954 Pineville, North Carolina, U.S.
- Died: November 2, 2023 (aged 69) Charlotte, North Carolina, U.S.
- Listed height: 6 ft 6 in (1.98 m)
- Listed weight: 193 lb (88 kg)

Career information
- High school: South Mecklenburg (Charlotte, North Carolina)
- College: North Carolina (1973–1977)
- NBA draft: 1977: 1st round, 5th overall pick
- Drafted by: Phoenix Suns
- Playing career: 1977–1992
- Position: Shooting guard / small forward
- Number: 6

Career history
- 1977–1988: Phoenix Suns
- 1988–1991: Denver Nuggets
- 1991: Portland Trail Blazers
- 1991–1992: Denver Nuggets

Career highlights
- 6× NBA All-Star (1978–1981, 1984, 1987); 2× All-NBA Second Team (1978, 1979); NBA Rookie of the Year (1978); NBA All-Rookie First Team (1978); No. 6 retired by Phoenix Suns; First-team All-ACC (1977); Second-team All-ACC (1976)

Career NBA statistics
- Points: 19,521 (18.9 ppg)
- Rebounds: 3,053 (3.0 rpg)
- Assists: 3,878 (3.8 apg)
- Stats at NBA.com
- Stats at Basketball Reference
- Basketball Hall of Fame
Medals
Men's basketball
Representing the United States
Olympic Games
| Gold medal – first place | 1976 Montreal | Team competition |

Walter Pearl Davis (September 9, 1954 – November 2, 2023) was an American professional basketball player. After his college years with the North Carolina Tar Heels he played as a forward/guard for 15 years in the National Basketball Association (NBA), spending the majority of his career with the Phoenix Suns. Davis was a six-time NBA All-Star, a two-time All-NBA Second Team member, and the NBA Rookie of the Year in 1978. In 1994, the Suns retired his No. 6 jersey and in 2004 he was enshrined in the team's Ring of Honor. Davis' 15,666 points during his time with the Suns is the 2nd most in franchise history. In 2024, it was announced that Davis would be posthumously inducted into the Naismith Memorial Basketball Hall of Fame.

== High school and college career ==
Born in Pineville, North Carolina, Davis was the youngest of 13 children born between 1937 and 1954. His high school teams at South Mecklenburg High School in Charlotte won three consecutive NCHSAA 4A state basketball titles in 1970, 1971, and 1972, and lost only four games. After his senior year, he prepped at the Sanford School in Hockessin, Delaware, and made the Delaware All-State team in the 1972–73 season.

Davis was a standout college player at the University of North Carolina at Chapel Hill, and was also selected to play on the USA men's basketball team coached by UNC's Dean Smith that won the gold medal at the 1976 Summer Olympics. In his freshman year, Davis hit a buzzer-beating jump shot against Duke at the end of regulation to send the game into overtime. At Chapel Hill, Davis was called "Sweet D" because of his seemingly effortless, smooth style of play and because of his strong defensive play.

== NBA career ==
The Suns selected Davis with the fifth pick of the 1977 NBA draft. He made an immediate impact, playing in 81 games and averaging 24.2 points per game in his first season, which would also be his career-high. He won the 1978 Rookie of the Year Award, and earned second team All-NBA honors. Over his first ten seasons, Davis averaged over 20 points per game six times, and earned trips to six All-Star Games.

On February 25, 1983, Davis set an all-time NBA record when he successfully scored his first 34 points before finally missing a shot. He made his first 15 field goals and converted four straight free throws before missing a jumper with 55 seconds left in the game. Larry Costello had formerly held the record, having made all of his attempts on his first 32 points for the Syracuse Nationals in 1961. The following year, during the 1984 NBA Playoffs, Davis led the Suns to the Western Conference Finals, averaging 24.9 points, 6.7 assists, and 2.7 rebounds through 17 games, before Phoenix was eliminated by the Los Angeles Lakers.

Over his career, Davis averaged 18.9 points, 3.8 assists and 3.0 rebounds per game. Davis was affectionately known as "The Greyhound" for his speedy style and sleek physical appearance. Suns broadcaster Al McCoy created many alternate nicknames for him, including "The Candyman", "Sweet D" and "The Man with the Velvet Touch." Davis was the Suns' all-time leading scorer with 15,666 points, before being surpassed by Devin Booker in 2025.

Davis' later years with the Suns were marred by recurring back problems and an ugly drug scandal. In 1987, he was called on to testify on illegal drug use by other Suns players in exchange for immunity from prosecution. (He had twice entered rehabilitation clinics to deal with cocaine addiction.)

Davis' decline mirrored the short decline of the Suns franchise, and at the expiration of his contract in 1988 at age 33, the team did not seriously attempt to re-sign him, offering a one-year contract at half his previous salary.

Davis signed a two-year, $1.35 million deal with the Denver Nuggets as an unrestricted free agent. He ended up playing for two years beyond this contract, and was included in a three-team trade in early 1991 that sent him to the Portland Trail Blazers for half a season. Davis finished 479 points shy of 20,000 points in a career. In the summer of 1991, he returned to Denver to close out his playing career.

== After basketball ==
Davis later served as a broadcaster for the Nuggets and as a scout for the Washington Wizards. As time passed, Davis and the Suns repaired their relationship. In 1994, his No. 6 was retired by the Suns, and in 2004 he was enshrined in the team's Ring of Honor. On October 28, 2023, Davis was reintroduced and given a commemorative watch from new Suns owner Mat Ishbia to celebrate the revamped version of the Phoenix Suns Ring of Honor.

Davis was the uncle of UNC men's head coach Hubert Davis, who also played for UNC and in the NBA.

Davis died in Charlotte, North Carolina, on November 2, 2023, at the age of 69. Following his death, Davis received his first nomination to be inducted into the Naismith Basketball Hall of Fame. On April 6, 2024, it was announced that Davis would be inducted to the Hall of Fame as part of the 2024 class. After the initial induction set for August 2024 was delayed until October due in part to the 2024 Summer Olympics, Davis would officially be inducted into the Basketball Hall of Fame on October 12–13, 2024.

== NBA career statistics ==
Legend
| GP | Games played | GS | Games started | MPG | Minutes per game |
| FG% | Field goal percentage | 3P% | 3-point field goal percentage | FT% | Free throw percentage |
| RPG | Rebounds per game | APG | Assists per game | SPG | Steals per game |
| BPG | Blocks per game | PPG | Points per game | **Bold** | Career high |

=== Regular season ===
| Year | Team | GP | GS | MPG | FG% | 3P% | FT% | RPG | APG | SPG | BPG | PPG |
|---|---|---|---|---|---|---|---|---|---|---|---|---|
| 1977–78 | Phoenix | **81** | – | 32.0 | .526 | – | .830 | **6.0** | 3.4 | 1.4 | 0.2 | **24.2** |
| 1978–79 | Phoenix | 79 | – | 30.8 | .561 | – | .831 | 4.7 | 4.3 | **1.9** | **0.3** | 23.6 |
| 1979–80 | Phoenix | 75 | – | 30.8 | **.563** | .000 | .819 | 3.6 | 4.5 | 1.5 | **0.3** | 21.5 |
| 1980–81 | Phoenix | 78 | – | 28.0 | .539 | **.412** | .836 | 2.6 | 3.9 | 1.2 | 0.2 | 18.0 |
| 1981–82 | Phoenix | 55 | 12 | 21.5 | .523 | .188 | .820 | 1.9 | 2.9 | 0.8 | 0.1 | 14.4 |
| 1982–83 | Phoenix | 80 | **79** | 31.1 | .516 | .304 | .818 | 2.5 | 5.0 | 1.5 | 0.2 | 19.0 |
| 1983–84 | Phoenix | 78 | 70 | 32.6 | .512 | .230 | .863 | 2.6 | **5.5** | 1.4 | 0.2 | 20.0 |
| 1984–85 | Phoenix | 23 | 9 | 24.8 | .450 | .300 | .877 | 1.5 | 4.3 | 0.8 | 0.0 | 15.0 |
| 1985–86 | Phoenix | 70 | 62 | 32.0 | .485 | .237 | .843 | 2.9 | 5.2 | 1.4 | 0.0 | 21.8 |
| 1986–87 | Phoenix | 79 | **79** | **33.5** | .514 | .259 | .862 | 3.1 | 4.6 | 1.2 | 0.1 | 23.6 |
| 1987–88 | Phoenix | 68 | 48 | 28.7 | .473 | .375 | .887 | 2.3 | 4.1 | 1.3 | 0.0 | 17.9 |
| 1988–89 | Denver | **81** | 0 | 22.9 | .498 | .290 | .879 | 1.9 | 2.3 | 0.9 | 0.1 | 15.6 |
| 1989–90 | Denver | 69 | 0 | 23.7 | .481 | .130 | .912 | 2.6 | 2.2 | 0.9 | 0.1 | 17.5 |
| 1990–91 | Denver | 39 | 13 | 26.8 | .474 | .303 | **.915** | 3.2 | 2.2 | 1.6 | 0.1 | 18.7 |
| 1990–91 | Portland | 32 | 1 | 13.7 | .446 | .333 | .913 | 1.8 | 1.3 | 0.6 | 0.0 | 6.1 |
| 1991–92 | Denver | 46 | 0 | 16.1 | .459 | .313 | .872 | 1.5 | 1.5 | 0.6 | 0.0 | 9.9 |
| Career | | 1,033 | 373 | 27.9 | .511 | .272 | .851 | 3.0 | 3.8 | 1.2 | 0.1 | 18.9 |
| All-Star | | 6 | 1 | 18.2 | .455 | 1.000 | 1.000 | 3.3 | 2.5 | 1.2 | 0.0 | 9.8 |

=== Playoffs ===
| Year | Team | GP | GS | MPG | FG% | 3P% | FT% | RPG | APG | SPG | BPG | PPG |
|---|---|---|---|---|---|---|---|---|---|---|---|---|
| 1978 | Phoenix | 2 | – | 33.0 | .475 | – | .750 | **8.5** | 4.0 | 1.5 | 0.0 | 25.0 |
| 1979 | Phoenix | 15 | – | 32.7 | .520 | – | .813 | 4.6 | 5.3 | 1.7 | 0.3 | 22.1 |
| 1980 | Phoenix | 8 | – | 30.6 | .504 | .000 | .737 | 2.9 | 4.4 | 0.5 | 0.1 | 20.8 |
| 1981 | Phoenix | 7 | – | 28.4 | .481 | .000 | .588 | 2.7 | 3.1 | 1.0 | 0.1 | 16.0 |
| 1982 | Phoenix | 7 | – | 24.7 | .448 | .333 | .917 | 3.1 | 4.3 | 0.7 | 0.1 | 18.1 |
| 1983 | Phoenix | 3 | – | **37.7** | .435 | **.500** | .810 | 5.0 | 4.3 | **2.0** | **1.7** | **26.0** |
| 1984 | Phoenix | **17** | – | 36.6 | **.535** | .273 | .897 | 2.7 | **6.4** | 1.7 | 0.2 | 24.9 |
| 1989 | Denver | 3 | 0 | 31.3 | .517 | .000 | **1.000** | 1.7 | 1.3 | 1.0 | 0.0 | 25.7 |
| 1990 | Denver | 3 | 0 | 23.3 | .400 | .000 | **1.000** | 3.0 | 2.0 | 0.3 | 0.0 | 14.0 |
| 1991 | Portland | 13 | 0 | 8.5 | .396 | .000 | .833 | 1.2 | 0.5 | 0.3 | 0.0 | 3.3 |
| Career | | 78 | ? | 28.0 | .496 | .192 | .830 | 3.1 | 4.0 | 1.1 | 0.2 | 18.6 |

== See also ==
- List of NBA rookie single-season scoring leaders
