= Anthony Roberts (basketball) =

American basketball player (1955–1997)

Personal information
- Born: April 15, 1955 Chattanooga, Tennessee, U.S.
- Died: March 29, 1997 (aged 41) Tulsa, Oklahoma, U.S.
- Listed height: 6 ft 5 in (1.96 m)
- Listed weight: 185 lb (84 kg)

Career information
- High school: Riverside (Chattanooga, Tennessee)
- College: Oral Roberts (1973–1977)
- NBA draft: 1977: 1st round, 21st overall pick
- Drafted by: Denver Nuggets
- Playing career: 1977–1984
- Position: Small forward / shooting guard
- Number: 21, 20, 30

Career history
- 1977–1979: Denver Nuggets
- 1980: Scranton Aces
- 1980–1981: Washington Bullets
- 1981–1982: Atlantic City Hi-Rollers
- 1982–1984: Wyoming Wildcatters
- 1984: Denver Nuggets

Career highlights
- CBA All-Star Game MVP (1984); No. 15 retired by Oral Roberts Golden Eagles

Career NBA statistics
- Points: 1,658 (7.8 ppg)
- Rebounds: 837 (3.9 rpg)
- Assists: 265 (1.2 apg)
- Stats at NBA.com
- Stats at Basketball Reference

Anthony Jerome Roberts (April 15, 1955 – March 29, 1997) was an American professional basketball player for the Denver Nuggets and Washington Bullets in the National Basketball Association (NBA). He was selected in the first round as the 21st pick in the 1977 NBA draft by the Nuggets and spent five seasons playing the NBA.

== Early life ==
Roberts was born in Chattanooga, Tennessee. He attended Riverside High School in his hometown.

== Basketball career ==
=== High school ===
Roberts played at Riverside High School in Chattanooga and was the MVP of the Tennessee state championship team in 1972.

=== College ===
Anthony Roberts attended Oral Roberts University (ORU) from 1973–74 to 1976–77. During his four-year career, he averaged 21.7 points and 7.4 rebounds per game, including a senior season in which he averaged 34.0 points and 9.2 rebounds. He is only one of two players in National Collegiate Athletic Association (NCAA) Division I history, along with Hall of Famer Pete Maravich, to score 60 or more points in a single game versus a Division I opponent more than once. Roberts scored 66 points on February 19, 1977, against North Carolina A&T and 65 against Oregon on March 9, 1977. His total against Oregon came in the first round of the National Invitation Tournament (NIT), setting the still-standing tournament record.

In 108 career games, Roberts made 1,006 of 2,007 field goal attempts while finishing with 2,341 points and exactly 800 rebounds. He earned honorable mention All-American honors for his final three years as a Titan. Later on, Roberts would become enshrined in the ORU athletics hall of fame as a member of their inaugural class.

=== Professional ===
On June 10, 1977, Roberts was selected in the first round of that year's NBA draft. The Denver Nuggets selected him with the 21st overall pick.

He spent his first three NBA seasons with Denver. He was eventually waived by the Nuggets and then signed by the Washington Bullets for the 1980–81 season. On September 2, 1981, the Bullets also waived Roberts, and he would not re-join another NBA team until February 16, 1984, when the Nuggets signed him to a 10-day contract. Nine days later he was signed for the rest of the season, where he would finish out his NBA career. The Nuggets waived him once again on July 25, 1984, and no other NBA team ever signed him. For his NBA career, Roberts scored 1,658 points, grabbed 837 rebounds and recorded 265 assists in 213 games.

Roberts played in the Continental Basketball Association for the Scranton Aces, Atlantic City Hi-Rollers and Wyoming Wildcatters from 1980 to 1984. He was selected as the CBA All-Star Game Most Valuable Player in 1984.

== Death ==
Anthony Roberts was shot and killed while arguing with two men in the parking lot outside his apartment complex on March 29, 1997. Brent Alan Kilby, 19, was charged with his murder. Kilby was sentenced to life in prison in 1998. Roberts was 41 at the time.

== Career statistics ==
Legend
GP	Games played	GS	Games started	MPG	Minutes per game
FG%	Field goal percentage	3P%	3-point field goal percentage	FT%	Free throw percentage
RPG	Rebounds per game	APG	Assists per game	SPG	Steals per game
BPG	Blocks per game	PPG	Points per game	**Bold**	Career high

=== NBA ===
==== Regular season ====
Year	Team	GP	GS	MPG	FG%	3P%	FT%	RPG	APG	SPG	BPG	PPG
1977–78	Denver	**82**		19.5	.423		**.722**	4.3	1.3	.5	**.1**	**9.5**
1978–79	Denver	63		19.6	**.424**		.691	4.1	**1.7**	.3	.0	7.9
1979–80	Denver	23		**21.1**	.381	.000	.650	**4.7**	.9	**.6**	**.1**	7.7
1980–81	Washington	26		13.5	.375	–	.655	2.6	.8	.4	.0	4.9
1983–84	Denver	19	0	10.4	.374	–	**.722**	2.7	.7	.3	**.1**	4.3
Career		213	0	18.2	.412	.000	.699	3.9	1.2	.4	.1	7.8

==== Playoffs ====
Year	Team	GP	MPG	FG%	FT%	RPG	APG	SPG	BPG	PPG
1978	Denver	**13**	**30.8**	**.432**	**.800**	**8.3**	**2.3**	**.8**	**.5**	**16.3**
1979	Denver	3	26.7	.394	.636	4.3	2.0	.7	.3	11.0
Career		16	30.0	.427	.770	7.6	2.3	.8	.4	15.3

== See also ==
- List of NCAA Division I men's basketball players with 60 or more points in a game
