= 1978 NBA All-Star Game =

Exhibition basketball game

| | 1 | 2 | 3 | 4 | Total |
|---|---|---|---|---|---|
| West | 39 | 27 | 34 | 25 | 125 |
| East | 28 | 29 | 35 | 41 | 133 |
- Date: February 5, 1978
- Arena: Omni Coliseum
- City: Atlanta
- MVP: Randy Smith
- Attendance: 15,491
- Network: CBS
- Announcers: Brent Musburger and Keith Erickson

NBA All-Star Game
| < 1977 | 1979 > |

The 1978 NBA All-Star Game was an exhibition basketball game played on February 5, 1978, at the Omni Coliseum in Atlanta, the home of the Atlanta Hawks. This was the first All-Star Game held in Atlanta and the fourth hosted by the Hawks, following the 1958, 1962, and 1965 games held in St. Louis.

Julius Erving of the Philadelphia 76ers led the All-Star voting. The East won the game 133–125. The MVP of the game was Buffalo Braves' Randy Smith, who scored a game-high 27 points for the East. The game was officiated by Jake O'Donnell and Jim Capers.

== Coaches ==
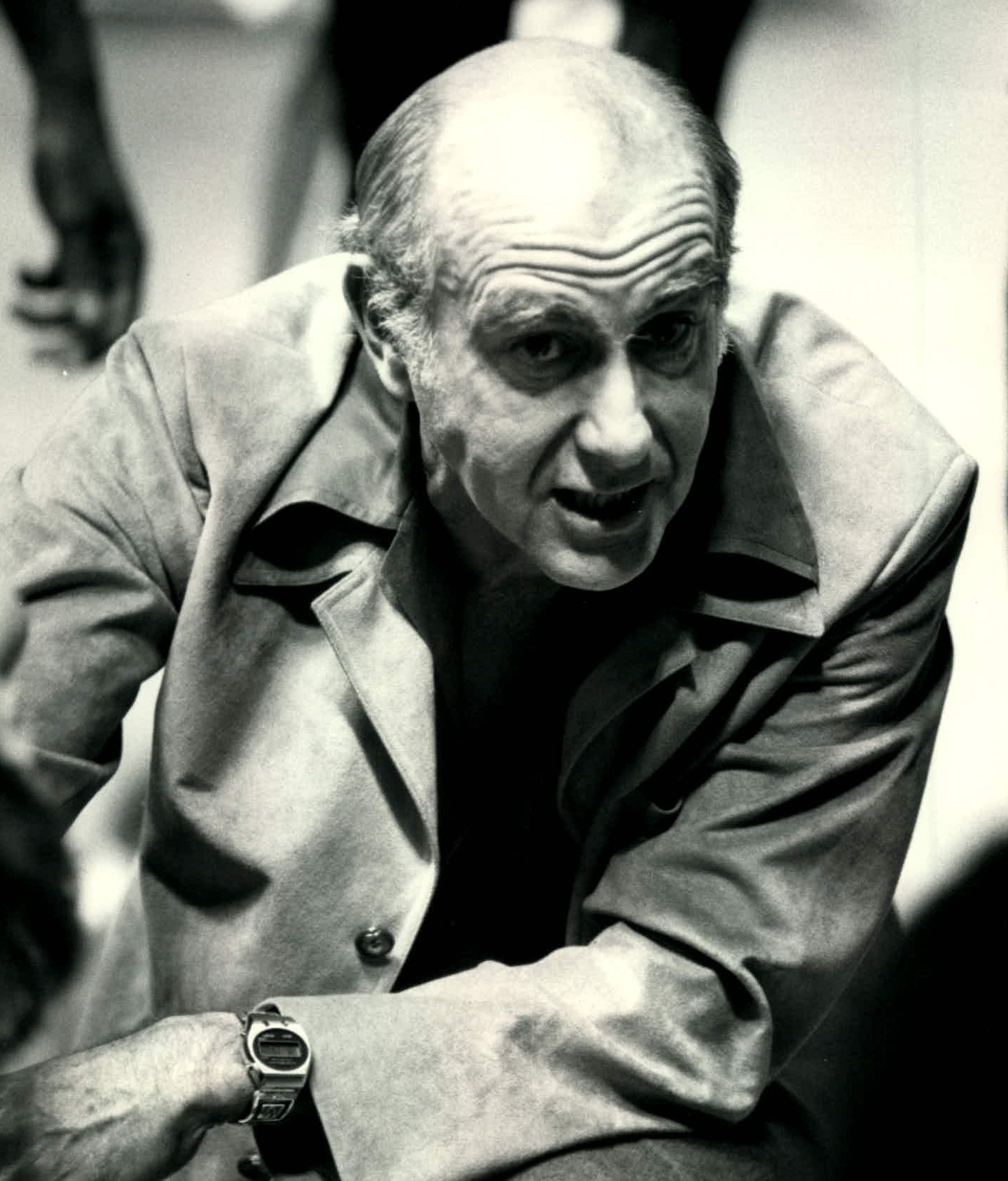
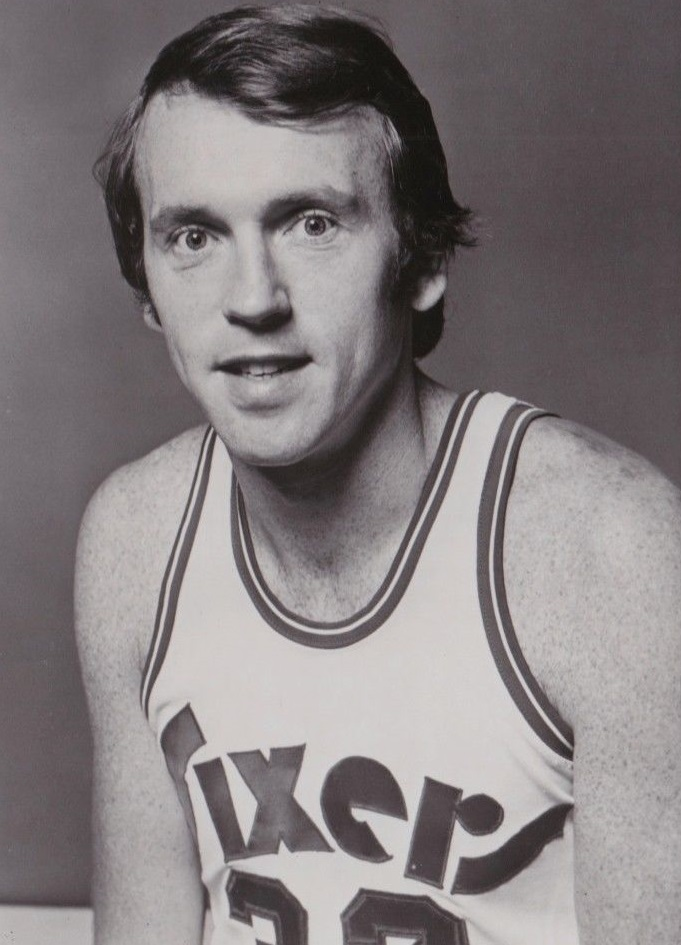
Jack Ramsay and Billy Cunningham were selected as the West and East head coach, respectively.

Billy Cunningham, head coach of the Eastern Conference leader Philadelphia 76ers, qualified as the head coach of the Eastern All-Stars. Jack Ramsay, head coach of the Western Conference leader Portland Trail Blazers, qualified as the head coach of the Western All-Stars.

== Roster ==
=== Western Conference ===
| Player, Team | MIN | FGM | FGA | FTM | FTA | REB | AST | BLK | PFS | PTS |
| David Thompson, DEN | 35 | 10 | 16 | 2 | 4 | 3 | 3 | 0 | 4 | 22 |
| Maurice Lucas, POR | 33 | 6 | 13 | 0 | 0 | 13 | 4 | 0 | 2 | 12 |
| Bill Walton, POR | 31 | 6 | 14 | 3 | 3 | 10 | 2 | 2 | 3 | 15 |
| Rick Barry, GSW | 30 | 7 | 17 | 1 | 1 | 4 | 5 | 0 | 6 | 15 |
| Paul Westphal, PHO | 24 | 9 | 14 | 2 | 5 | 0 | 5 | 1 | 4 | 20 |
| Lionel Hollins, POR | 23 | 3 | 8 | 4 | 5 | 0 | 8 | 0 | 2 | 10 |
| Bobby Jones, DEN | 18 | 1 | 3 | 0 | 0 | 6 | 2 | 1 | 4 | 2 |
| Walter Davis, PHO | 15 | 3 | 6 | 4 | 4 | 1 | 6 | 0 | 1 | 10 |
| Brian Winters, MIL | 14 | 4 | 7 | 0 | 0 | 4 | 1 | 0 | 2 | 8 |
| Artis Gilmore, CHI | 13 | 2 | 4 | 6 | 8 | 2 | 0 | 2 | 1 | 10 |
| Bob Lanier, DET | 4 | 0 | 0 | 1 | 2 | 2 | 0 | 0 | 0 | 1 |
| Totals | 240 | 51 | 102 | 23 | 32 | 45 | 36 | 6 | 29 | 125 |

=== Eastern Conference ===
| Player, Team | MIN | FGM | FGA | FTM | FTA | REB | AST | BLK | PFS | PTS |
| Randy Smith, BUF | 29 | 11 | 14 | 5 | 6 | 7 | 6 | 0 | 5 | 27 |
| Dave Cowens, BOS | 28 | 7 | 9 | 0 | 0 | 14 | 5 | 0 | 5 | 14 |
| Julius Erving, PHI | 27 | 3 | 14 | 10 | 12 | 8 | 3 | 1 | 1 | 16 |
| Doug Collins, PHI | 27 | 3 | 8 | 8 | 11 | 5 | 8 | 0 | 3 | 14 |
| Truck Robinson, NOJ | 24 | 3 | 7 | 1 | 2 | 6 | 1 | 0 | 2 | 7 |
| John Havlicek, BOS | 22 | 5 | 8 | 0 | 0 | 3 | 1 | 0 | 2 | 10 |
| Larry Kenon, SAS | 20 | 8 | 15 | 0 | 0 | 4 | 0 | 0 | 0 | 16 |
| Bob McAdoo, NYK | 20 | 7 | 14 | 0 | 0 | 4 | 0 | 0 | 2 | 14 |
| George Gervin, SAS | 18 | 4 | 11 | 1 | 3 | 2 | 1 | 1 | 2 | 9 |
| Moses Malone, HOU | 14 | 1 | 1 | 2 | 4 | 4 | 1 | 0 | 1 | 4 |
| Elvin Hayes, WSB | 11 | 1 | 7 | 0 | 0 | 4 | 0 | 0 | 4 | 2 |
Pete Maravich, NOJ (injured)
| Totals | 240 | 53 | 108 | 27 | 38 | 61 | 26 | 2 | 27 | 133 |

== Score by periods ==
| Score by periods: | 1 | 2 | 3 | 4 | Final |
| West | 39 | 27 | 34 | 25 | 125 |
| East | 28 | 29 | 35 | 41 | 133 |
