= Adidas Top Ten =

Line of shoes by Adidas

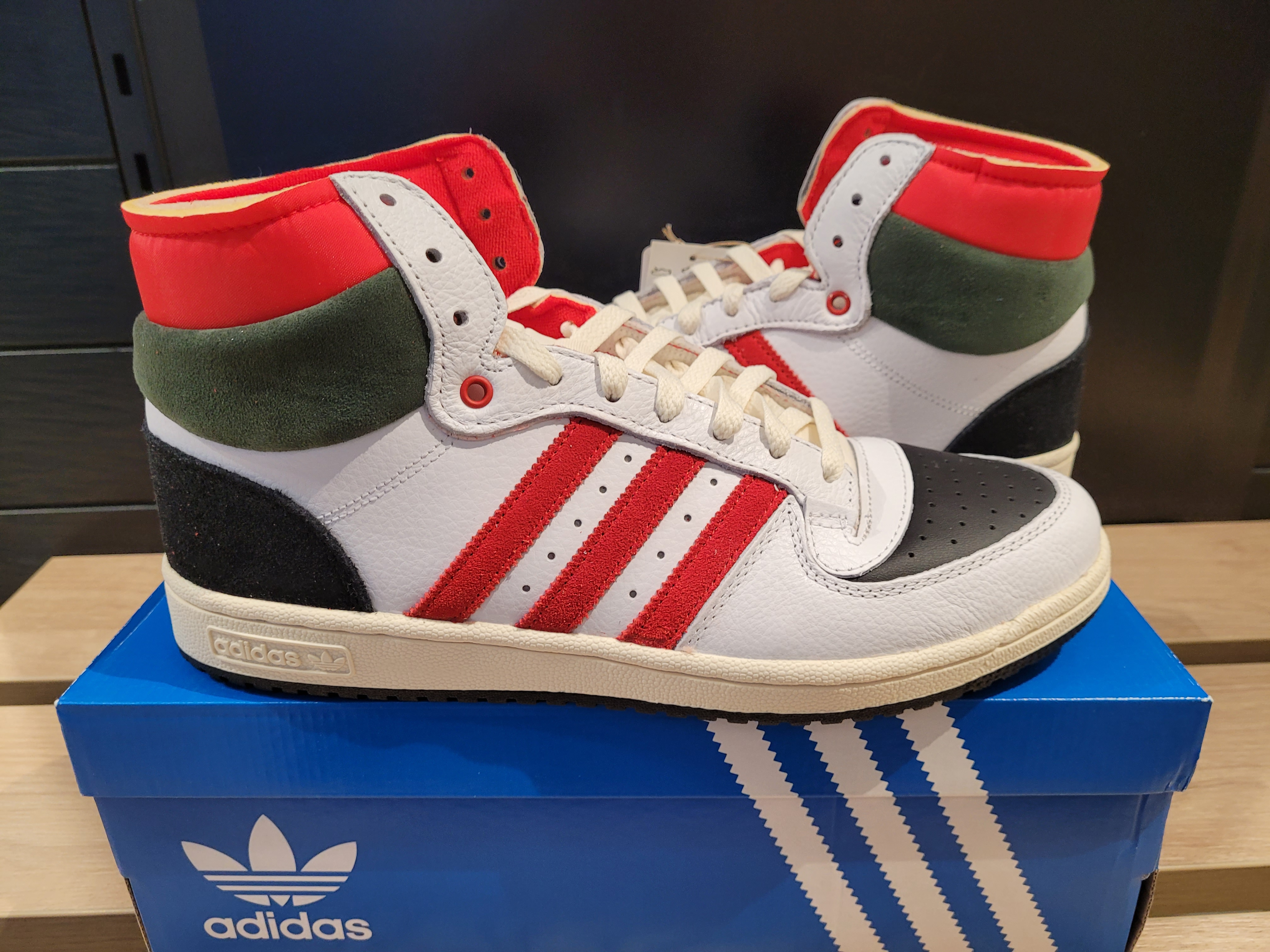
- Type: Sneakers
- Inventor: Adidas
- Inception: 1979; 47 years ago
- Manufacturer: Adidas
- Available: Yes

Adidas Top Ten is a line of basketball shoes released by Adidas in 1979. The original line has since transitioned to a lifestyle shoe along with its later revisions.

== History ==
Adidas already had many basketball shoes available, but each shoe was mainly designed around one specific role and position for a player. Adidas wanted to design a shoe that would be more universal and useful to every player on the court. The plan for the shoe also included not only having one player be the face of the new product but rather have the top ten players in the NBA promote the shoes, inspiring the name of "Top Ten". The company decided to contact NBA player Rick Barry to help design the shoe. The chosen players to be the group of ten spokespeople were Doug Collins, Marques Johnson, Kermit Washington, Adrian Dantley, Bob Lanier, Bobby Jones, Billy Knight, Sidney Wicks, Mitch Kupchak, and Kevin Grevey.

The shoe has been rereleased many times, notably in the Midwest and Northeast regions of the United States such as Detroit. The shoe is often referenced in many media including music and art within the city.

== Models ==
=== Top Ten 2000 ===
Adidas had signed Kobe Bryant right during the start of his career and as part of the deal, they decided introduce a new version of the sneaker called Top Ten 2000 which Kobe helped promote when it released in 1996. Since the passing of Kobe Bryant, the shoe along with the other sneakers worn by him during his time with Adidas have become widely popular due to their unique design and different aesthetics than his official shoes with Nike.

=== Top Ten 2010 ===
An updated version of the previous model released in 1997, it featured the same technology with slight changes made to the upper.

== Collaborations ==
In 2014, VILLA launched a special edition of the shoe called the "Triple Crown" which paid homage to the city of Detroit, the place where the shoe is the most popular. The colors of the shoe represent the baseball team of the city.

In 2019, Adidas worked with Tommey Walker to release another Detroit inspired version of the sneaker dubbed celebrating the Detroit holiday, "313 Day" which is the area code for the city. The collaboration not only included a new design of the Top Ten but also special clothing as well.
