= Bernard King =

American basketball player (born 1956)

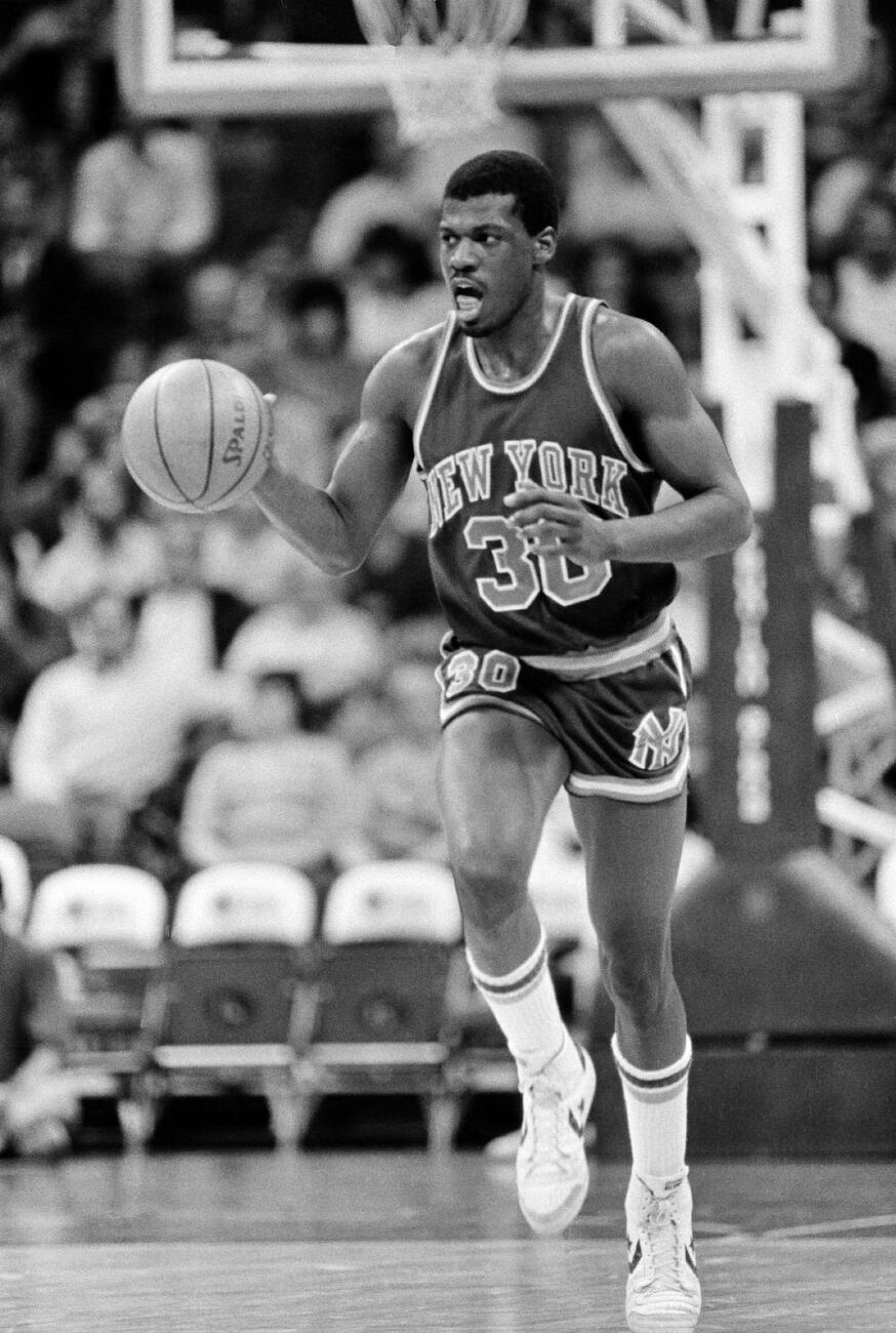
- King with the New York Knicks in 1984

Personal information
- Born: December 4, 1956 (age 69) Brooklyn, New York, U.S.
- Listed height: 6 ft 7 in (2.01 m)
- Listed weight: 205 lb (93 kg)

Career information
- High school: Fort Hamilton (Brooklyn, New York)
- College: Tennessee (1974–1977)
- NBA draft: 1977: 1st round, 7th overall pick
- Drafted by: New York Nets
- Playing career: 1977–1993
- Position: Small forward
- Number: 22, 30

Career history
- 1977–1979: New Jersey Nets
- 1979–1980: Utah Jazz
- 1980–1982: Golden State Warriors
- 1982–1987: New York Knicks
- 1987–1991: Washington Bullets
- 1993: New Jersey Nets

Career highlights
- 4× NBA All-Star (1982, 1984, 1985, 1991); 2× All-NBA First Team (1984, 1985); All-NBA Second Team (1982); All-NBA Third Team (1991); NBA Comeback Player of the Year (1981); NBA All-Rookie Team (1978); NBA scoring champion (1985); Consensus first-team All-American (1977); Consensus second-team All-American (1976); Third-team All-American – NABC (1975); 3× SEC Player of the Year (1975–1977); 3x First Team All-SEC (1975–1977); No. 53 retired by Tennessee Volunteers

Career NBA statistics
- Points: 19,655 (22.5 ppg)
- Rebounds: 5,060 (5.8 rpg)
- Assists: 2,863 (3.3 apg)
- Stats at NBA.com
- Stats at Basketball Reference
- Basketball Hall of Fame

Bernard King (born December 4, 1956) is an American former professional basketball player at the small forward position in the National Basketball Association (NBA). He played 14 seasons with the New Jersey Nets, Utah Jazz, Golden State Warriors, New York Knicks, and Washington Bullets. King is a four-time NBA All-Star, four-time All-NBA selection and led the NBA in scoring in the 1984–85 season. He was inducted into the Naismith Memorial Basketball Hall of Fame on September 8, 2013. His younger brother, Albert, also played in the NBA during his career.

Basketball legend Julius Erving, otherwise known as "Dr. J", said King was the toughest player he had ever faced.

== Early life and college ==
Bernard King was born on December 4, 1956, in Brooklyn, New York. He developed his basketball skills on the playgrounds of Fort Greene in Brooklyn, where he was raised in the Walt Whitman Houses. King used the outdoor courts in New York City to refine his game and as an escape from his surroundings. Reflecting on this time, King noted how the parks provided a space where he could focus entirely on basketball, teaching him discipline and motivating him to pursue greatness.

During his high school career at Fort Hamilton he averaged 26 points and 28 rebounds.

King attended the University of Tennessee, where he had a successful collegiate basketball career. His time in college prepared him for his future in professional basketball.

== NBA career ==
At 6 ft 7 in (2.01 m) and 205 pounds, King was an explosive, high-scoring small forward utilizing long arms and a quick release. King was a tremendous scorer. In the 1984–85 season, he led the NBA in scoring with 32.9 points per game.

=== New Jersey Nets ===
After playing college basketball for the Tennessee Volunteers, the New York Nets selected King with the seventh overall pick in the 1977 NBA draft, Months later, the Nets relocated from Uniondale, New York, to New Jersey and became known as the New Jersey Nets.

In 1977–78, his rookie season, King set a New Jersey Nets franchise record for most points scored in a season with 1,909, at 24.2 points per game. For his efforts, he was named to the NBA all-rookie first team and placed third in NBA Rookie of the Year voting, behind Walter Davis and Marques Johnson. He would surpass this record with his 2,027-point season in 1983–84, earning the first of his back-to-back All-NBA First Team selections.

=== Utah Jazz ===
King played for the Utah Jazz in the 1979–80 season and averaged 9.3 points per game in 19 games.

=== Golden State Warriors ===
The Jazz traded King to the Golden State Warriors before the 1980–81 season. Over two years, he averaged 21.9 points per game, in his first year playing alongside players such as 1980 NBA All-Star World B. Free, Joe Barry Carroll, and Clifford Ray and 23.2 points per game in his second year with the team. Just before the start of the 1982–83 season, King was traded to the New York Knicks in exchange for Micheal Ray Richardson.

=== New York Knicks ===
On a Texas road trip on January 31 and February 1, 1984, King made history by becoming the first player since Rick Barry in 1967 to score at least 50 points in consecutive games. He scored 50 points on 20 for 30 shooting with 10 free throws in a 117–113 Knicks' victory over the San Antonio Spurs on January 31. King followed this with another 50-point performance at Dallas, setting a Reunion Arena single-game scoring record in the process. He scored 11 points in both the first and second quarters and 14 points in both the third and fourth quarters. King drew 13 fouls on Dallas Mavericks defenders, including Mark Aguirre, who fouled out. King shot 20 for 28 from the field with 10 free throws in the 105–98 win over the Mavericks.

The next season, on Christmas Day, 1984, King lit up the New Jersey Nets for 60 points in a losing effort, becoming just the tenth player in NBA history to score 60 or more points in a single game. King had scored 40 points by halftime, and finished the game with 19 of 30 shooting from the field and 22 of 26 from the free throw line.

At the peak of his career, however, King suffered a devastating injury to his right leg while planting it under the hoop attempting to block a dunk by Kansas City King Reggie Theus on March 23, 1985. The injury included a torn anterior cruciate ligament, torn meniscus, and lateral condyle fracture of the femur, required major reconstruction, causing King to miss all of the 1985–86 season. To that point no NBA player had returned to form after such a potentially career-ending injury, surgery, and loss of time.

Rehabilitating completely out of the media spotlight, King drove himself back into competitive shape. Despite averaging 22.7 points per game during his first six games back, he had not recovered his pre-injury explosiveness and was released by the Knicks at the end of the 1987 season.

=== Washington Bullets ===
King spent the 1987–88 season climbing back to his former stature as a scorer with the Washington Bullets. That season, during which King, fellow all-star journeyman Moses Malone, and Jeff Malone teamed up to form a formidable trio, would be the only time Washington made the playoffs during King's tenure. In the first round, the Bullets lost a contested five-game series 3–2 against the up-and-coming Detroit Pistons, who would go on to make the NBA Finals.

On November 3, 1990, King scored 44 points in a win over Michael Jordan and the Bulls, which was the most points King had scored in a game since his devastating 1985 knee injury. On December 29, in a game against the Denver Nuggets, King scored a season high 52 points in a 161–133 victory. It was the most points a Washington player had scored since the team moved from Baltimore in 1972. That season, King was selected to his fourth all-star team.

From 1989 to 1991, King averaged 20-plus points in three consecutive seasons. His scoring average peaked at 28.4 points per game at age 34 in 1991, which included ten games where King scored more than 40 points.

=== New Jersey Nets ===
After a year-and-a-half hiatus due to yet another knee injury, King returned for a 32-game stint with the New Jersey Nets at the end of the 1992–93 season, until knee problems forced him to retire from the NBA permanently.

== NBA career statistics ==
King retired with 19,655 points in 874 games, good for a 22.5 points per game average and number 16 on the all-time NBA scoring list at the time of his retirement.

Legend
GP	Games played	GS	Games started	MPG	Minutes per game
FG%	Field goal percentage	3P%	3-point field goal percentage	FT%	Free throw percentage
RPG	Rebounds per game	APG	Assists per game	SPG	Steals per game
BPG	Blocks per game	PPG	Points per game	**Bold**	Career high
*	Led the league

=== Regular season ===
Year	Team	GP	GS	MPG	FG%	3P%	FT%	RPG	APG	SPG	BPG	PPG
1977–78	New Jersey	79	—	**39.1**	.479	—	.677	**9.5**	2.4	**1.5**	**.5**	24.2
1978–79	New Jersey	**82**	—	34.9	.522	—	.564	8.2	3.6	1.4	**.5**	21.6
1979–80	Utah	19	—	22.1	.518	—	.540	4.6	2.7	.4	.2	9.3
1980–81	Golden State	81	—	36.0	**.588**	**.333**	.703	6.8	3.5	.9	.4	21.9
1981–82	Golden State	79	77	36.2	.566	.200	.705	5.9	3.6	1.0	.3	23.2
1982–83	New York	68	68	32.5	.528	.000	.722	4.8	2.9	1.3	.2	21.9
1983–84	New York	77	76	34.6	.572	.000	.779	5.1	2.1	1.0	.2	26.3
1984–85	New York	55	55	37.5	.530	.100	.772	5.8	3.7	1.3	.3	**32.9***
1986–87	New York	6	4	35.7	.495	—	.744	5.3	3.2	.3	.0	22.7
1987–88	Washington	69	38	29.6	.501	.167	.762	4.1	2.8	.7	.1	17.2
1988–89	Washington	81	81	31.6	.477	.167	**.819**	4.7	3.6	.8	.2	20.7
1989–90	Washington	**82**	**82**	32.8	.487	.130	.803	4.9	**4.6**	.6	.1	22.4
1990–91	Washington	64	64	37.5	.472	.216	.790	5.0	**4.6**	.9	.3	28.4
1992–93	New Jersey	32	2	13.4	.514	.286	.684	2.4	.6	.3	.1	7.0
Career		874	547	33.7	.518	.172	.730	5.8	3.3	1.0	.3	22.5
All-Star		4	1	21.0	.474	—	.692	4.3	2.3	.8	.5	11.3

=== Playoffs ===
Year	Team	GP	GS	MPG	FG%	3P%	FT%	RPG	APG	SPG	BPG	PPG
1979	New Jersey	2	—	**40.5**	.500	—	.417	5.5	**3.5**	**2.0**	.0	26.0
1983	New York	6	—	30.7	**.577**	**.333**	.800	4.0	2.2	.3	.0	23.5
1984	New York	**12**	—	39.8	.574	.000	.756	**6.2**	3.0	1.2	**.5**	**34.8**
1988	Washington	5	4	33.6	.491	—	**.810**	2.2	1.8	.6	.0	13.8
1993	New Jersey	3	1	8.0	.571	—	—	.3	.0	.3	.0	2.7
Career		28	5	33.4	.559	.250	.729	4.3	2.3	.9	.2	24.5

== Awards and recognition ==
At the age of 24, King won the NBA Comeback Player of the Year Award for his play during the 1980–1981 season with the Golden State Warriors. That year, King averaged 21.9 points per game after having played just 19 games the season before with the Utah Jazz.

On February 13, 2007, Bernard King's number 53 was retired at the halftime of the Tennessee-Kentucky basketball game at Thompson–Boling Arena in Knoxville, Tennessee. His jersey number was the first jersey number retired by the Volunteers, who later retired the number of Ernie Grunfeld, King's former teammate. The late 1970s Tennessee men's basketball team was known as the "Ernie and Bernie Show" (in reference to Grunfeld and King) and is viewed by many as the golden age of UT men's basketball. During an ESPN interview after halftime, King stated he had not returned to the University of Tennessee in more than 30 years, but expressed his sincere appreciation to the university and his plans to return again. His reason for not visiting his alma mater was simply that he had not been asked. King's ceremony punctuated an 89–85 Tennessee victory over the visiting Wildcats.

During the 2006 NBA All-Star Game, a panel of basketball analysts for the TNT network selected Bernard King as one of nominees of the "Next 10", a list of 10 unofficial additions to the NBA's 50 greatest players list in honor of the NBA's 60th anniversary.

In 2013, he was elected to the Naismith Memorial Basketball Hall of Fame with inductees such as Rick Pitino and Gary Payton.

== Broadcasting career ==
King is now working as a part-time broadcaster for NBA TV as well as the MSG Network, filling in on some occasions as color commentator when Walt Frazier is on vacation.

== Acting career ==
King made an appearance in Miami Vice as Matt Ferguson, son of Judge Roger Ferguson (played by Bill Russell), a basketball star with the fictitious Florida Sunblazers in the episode "The Fix". He also appeared in the 1979 movie Fast Break (with Reb Brown).

== Personal life ==
=== Legal Troubles ===
In July 1977, a month after being drafted by the Nets, King was arrested and charged with burglary for breaking into a UT athletics building to steal a television set. He had earlier been suspended from the Tennessee team after being arrested for marijuana possession (later acquitted), drunk driving, and resisting arrest (all later dropped), which stemmed from an arrest after police were called by a woman who said a man was trying to break into her apartment, and upon arrival they found King in the hallway.

In December 1978, King was arrested by the NYPD while sleeping in his car with "less than $10 worth" of cocaine on hand, and was charged with several misdemeanors, later dropped.

In January 1980, King was arrested in Salt Lake City after complaint of forcible sexual assault by a woman. Facing a possible 10-year sentence, he took multiple lie detector tests to support his assertion that he had been so intoxicated he had no recollection of the events in question. That June, he would plead guilty to a reduced charge of attempted forcible sexual abuse, and received a fine and suspended sentence.

In his 2017 autobiography, King would say that he battled alcohol addiction in the late 1970s, and that it was "the darkest period of my life". Following his early-1980 arrest, he spent a month at a California rehab center, and then sought help through Alcoholics Anonymous.

After his playing career was over, more troubles followed. In August 1994, an intoxicated King was arrested in New York and charged with assaulting a 22-year-old woman in his apartment, after allegedly grabbing her around the neck in an altercation (for which she was treated for bruises at a local hospital). In October 2004, King was again arrested in New York for battery of his wife Shana, who told authorities he had pushed her to the ground three times; the incident left her black and blue with bruises on her eye and swelling on her forehead. The charges were dropped after King agreed to marriage counseling sessions, but the incident cost King a promotional relationship with local property developer Bruce Ratner, as well as resulting in his name being removed as an honoree of the Brooklyn Public Library.

== See also ==
- List of NBA career turnovers leaders
- List of NBA single-season scoring leaders
- List of NBA rookie single-season scoring leaders
- List of NBA single-game scoring leaders
