= UCLA Bruins retired numbers =

UCLA Bruins retired numbers may refer to:

- UCLA Bruins men's basketball retired numbers
- UCLA Bruins football retired numbers
