= 1976 NCAA Men's Basketball All-Americans =

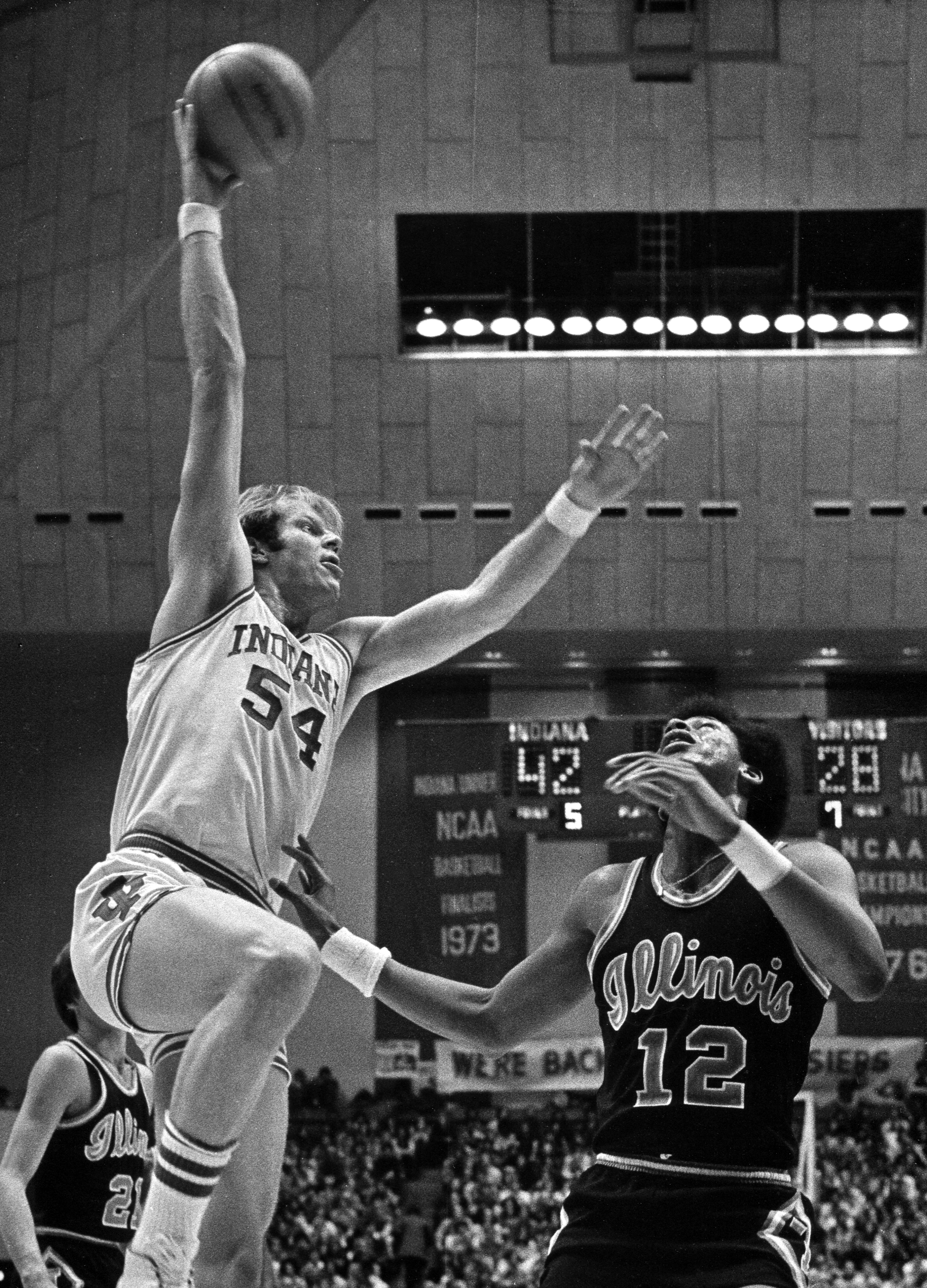
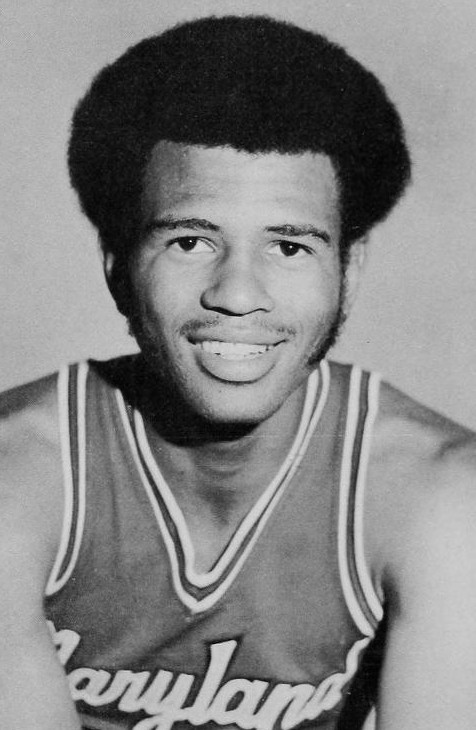
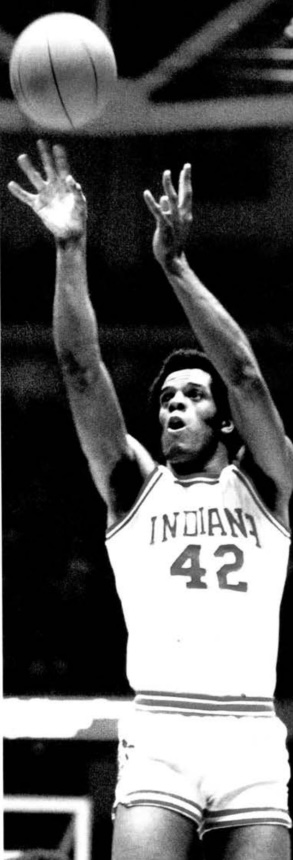
- Members of the 1976 Consensus All-America first team. From left: Benson, Lucas, May (not pictured: Dantley, Washington).
- Awarded for: 1975–76 NCAA Division I men's basketball season

The consensus 1976 College Basketball All-American team, as determined by aggregating the results of four major All-American teams. To earn "consensus" status, a player must win honors from a majority of the following teams: the Associated Press, the USBWA, The United Press International and the National Association of Basketball Coaches.

== 1976 Consensus All-America team ==
Consensus First Team
Player	Position	Class	Team
Kent Benson	C	Junior	Indiana
Adrian Dantley	F	Junior	Notre Dame
John Lucas	G	Senior	Maryland
Scott May	F	Senior	Indiana
Richard Washington	F/C	Junior	UCLA

Consensus Second Team
Player	Position	Class	Team
Phil Ford	G	Sophomore	North Carolina
Bernard King	F	Sophomore	Tennessee
Mitch Kupchak	F/C	Senior	North Carolina
Phil Sellers	G	Senior	Rutgers
Earl Tatum	G/F	Senior	Marquette

== Individual All-America teams ==
All-America Team
All-America Team	First team		Second team		Third team	
All-America Team	Player	School	Player	School	Player	School
Associated Press	Kent Benson	Indiana	Phil Ford	North Carolina	Kenny Carr	North Carolina State
Associated Press	Adrian Dantley	Notre Dame	Mitch Kupchak	North Carolina	Leon Douglas	Alabama
Associated Press	John Lucas	Maryland	Ron Lee	Oregon	Terry Furlow	Michigan State
Associated Press	Scott May	Indiana	Robert Parish	Centenary	Bernard King	Tennessee
Associated Press	Phil Sellers	Rutgers	Richard Washington	UCLA	Earl Tatum	Marquette
USBWA	Adrian Dantley	Notre Dame	Kent Benson	Indiana	No third team	
USBWA	Bernard King	Tennessee	Mitch Kupchak	North Carolina	No third team	
USBWA	John Lucas	Maryland	Phil Sellers	Rutgers	No third team	
USBWA	Scott May	Indiana	Willie Smith	Missouri	No third team	
USBWA	Richard Washington	UCLA	Earl Tatum	Marquette	No third team	
NABC	Kent Benson	Indiana	Leon Douglas	Alabama	Kenny Carr	North Carolina State
NABC	Adrian Dantley	Notre Dame	Marques Johnson	UCLA	Ernie Grunfeld	Tennessee
NABC	Phil Ford	North Carolina	Mitch Kupchak	North Carolina	Bernard King	Tennessee
NABC	Scott May	Indiana	Phil Sellers	Rutgers	Ron Lee	Oregon
NABC	Richard Washington	UCLA	Earl Tatum	Marquette	Willie Smith	Missouri
UPI	Kent Benson	Indiana	Phil Ford	North Carolina	Kenny Carr	North Carolina State
UPI	Adrian Dantley	Notre Dame	Bernard King	Tennessee	Leon Douglas	Alabama
UPI	John Lucas	Maryland	Mitch Kupchak	North Carolina	Terry Furlow	Michigan State
UPI	Scott May	Indiana	Phil Sellers	Rutgers	Ernie Grunfeld	Tennessee
UPI	Richard Washington	UCLA	Earl Tatum	Marquette	Ron Lee	Oregon

AP Honorable Mention:

- Otis Birdsong, Houston
- Quinn Buckner, Indiana
- Mike Dabney, Rutgers
- Lee Dixon, Hardin–Simmons
- James Edwards, Washington
- Alex English, South Carolina
- Jeff Fosnes, Vanderbilt
- Rickey Green, Michigan
- Ernie Grunfeld, Tennessee
- Matt Hicks, Northern Illinois
- Armond Hill, Princeton
- George Johnson, St. John's
- Marques Johnson, UCLA
- Eddie Jordan, Rutgers
- Tom Lockhart, Manhattan
- Mike McConathy, Louisiana Tech
- Eddie Owens, UNLV
- Sonny Parker, Texas A&M
- Sam Pellom, Buffalo
- Mike Phillips, Kentucky
- Anthony Roberts, Oral Roberts
- Marshall Rogers, Texas–Pan American
- Tree Rollins, Clemson
- Lonnie Shelton, Oregon State
- Willie Smith, Missouri
- Mychal Thompson, Minnesota
- Todd Tripucka, Lafayette
- Wally Walker, Virginia
- Lloyd Walton, Marquette
- Bob Wilkerson, Indiana
- Chuckie Williams, Kansas State
- Freeman Williams, Portland State

== See also ==
- 1975–76 NCAA Division I men's basketball season
