= NBA Most Improved Player =

National Basketball Association award

- Sport: Basketball
- League: National Basketball Association
- Awarded for: Player with greatest improvement in playing ability in regular season of the National Basketball Association

History
- First award: 1985–86
- Most recent: Nickeil Alexander-Walker, Atlanta Hawks (2026)

The NBA's Most Improved Player (MIP) is an annual National Basketball Association (NBA) award given to the player who has shown the most progress during the regular season compared to previous seasons. The winner is selected by a panel of sportswriters throughout the United States and Canada, each of whom casts a vote for first, second and third place selections. Each first-place vote is worth five points; each second-place vote is worth three points, and each third-place vote is worth one point. The player with the highest point total, regardless of the number of first-place votes, wins the award. The criteria for selecting the most improved player was initially open-ended, but the NBA clarified in later years that it was intended for an up-and-coming player who improved dramatically and not a player who made a comeback, distinguishing it from the defunct NBA Comeback Player of the Year Award. Since the 2022–23 NBA season, winners receive the George Mikan Trophy, named after the five-time NBA champion.

As part of efforts to reduce load management for star players in the league, effective with the 2023–24 season, when a new collective bargaining agreement (CBA) between the league and its players' union took effect, players must appear in at least 65 games to be eligible for most major regular-season awards, including Most Improved Player. To receive credit for a game for purposes of award eligibility, a player must have been credited with at least 20 minutes played. However, two "near misses", in which the player appeared for 15 to 19 minutes, can be included in the 65-game count. Protections also exist for players who suffer season-ending injuries, who are eligible with 62 credited games, and those affected by what the CBA calls "bad faith circumstances".

Since its inception, the award has been given to 37 players. No player has ever won the award twice. Boris Diaw, Kevin Love, Pascal Siakam, and Giannis Antetokounmpo are the only award winners to win an NBA Championship, Siakam is the only winner to win a championship in the same season as the award, and Antetokounmpo is the only winner to win NBA Finals MVP. Rony Seikaly,^{[a]} Gheorghe Mureșan, Boris Diaw, Hedo Türkoğlu, Goran Dragić, Giannis Antetokounmpo, Pascal Siakam, Lauri Markkanen, Dyson Daniels, and Nickeil Alexander-Walker are the only award winners born outside the United States.

Alvin Robertson, Dana Barros, Tracy McGrady, Jermaine O'Neal, Danny Granger, Kevin Love, Paul George, Jimmy Butler, Giannis Antetokounmpo, Victor Oladipo, Brandon Ingram, Julius Randle, Ja Morant, Lauri Markkanen, and Tyrese Maxey have won the award and been selected as an NBA All-Star in the same season; Dale Ellis, Kevin Duckworth, Kevin Johnson, Gilbert Arenas, Zach Randolph, Goran Dragic, and Pascal Siakam were the other winners who were selected in a later season to play in the All-Star Game. Only McGrady, O'Neal, George, Dragić, Antetokounmpo, Oladipo, Randle and Morant won the award and were named to the All-NBA Team in the same season. Pascal Siakam made the All-NBA Second Team the year after he won the award. The Indiana Pacers and Orlando Magic have each seen five players win the award, the most in the NBA. Giannis Antetokounmpo is the first recipient of the award to later become an NBA MVP. Tracy McGrady is the only recipient to win a scoring title as well as being the first recipient of the award to be named to the Naismith Memorial Basketball Hall of Fame.

== Winners ==
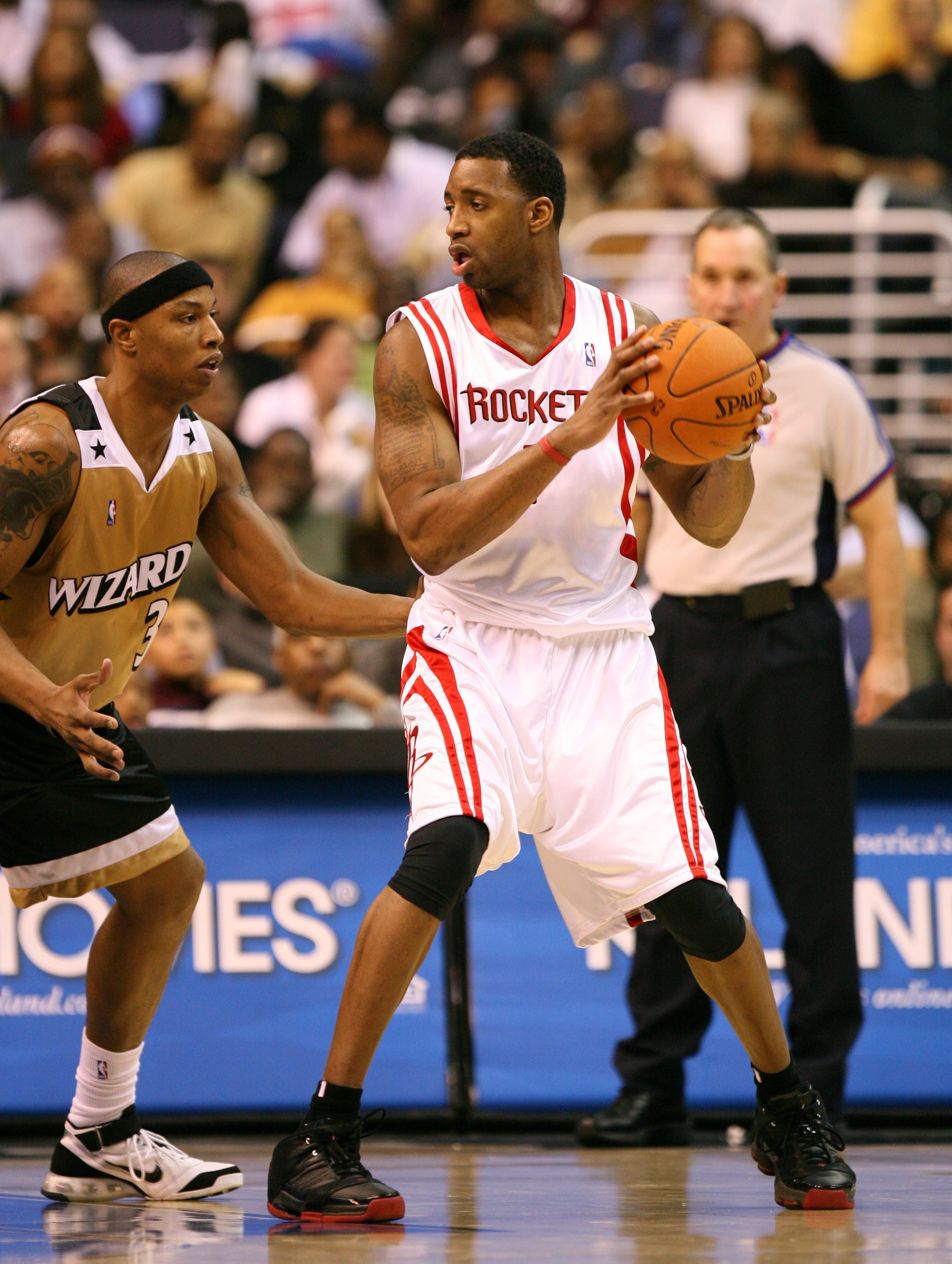
Tracy McGrady won the award in the 2000–01 NBA season.

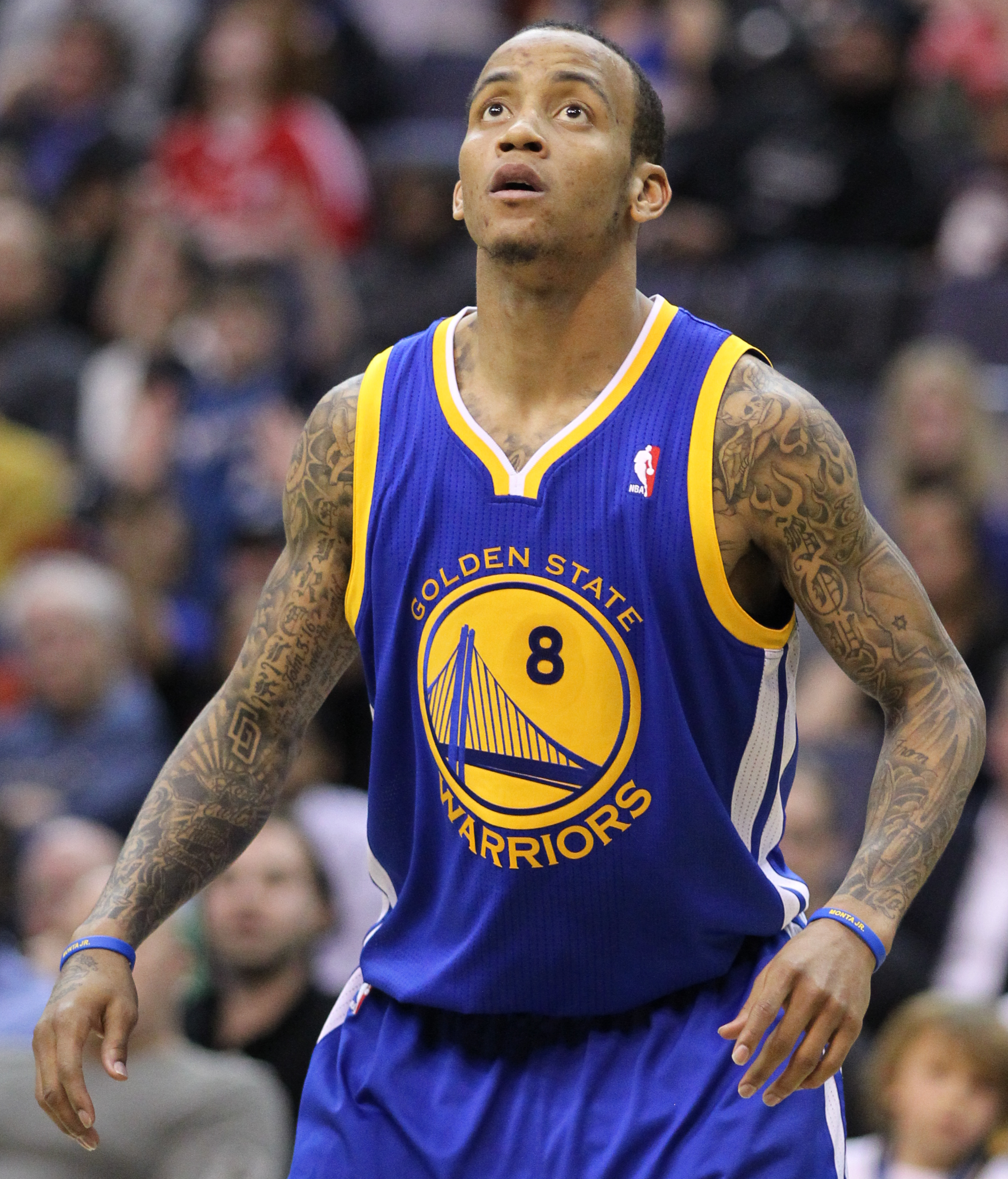
Monta Ellis won in 2006–07.

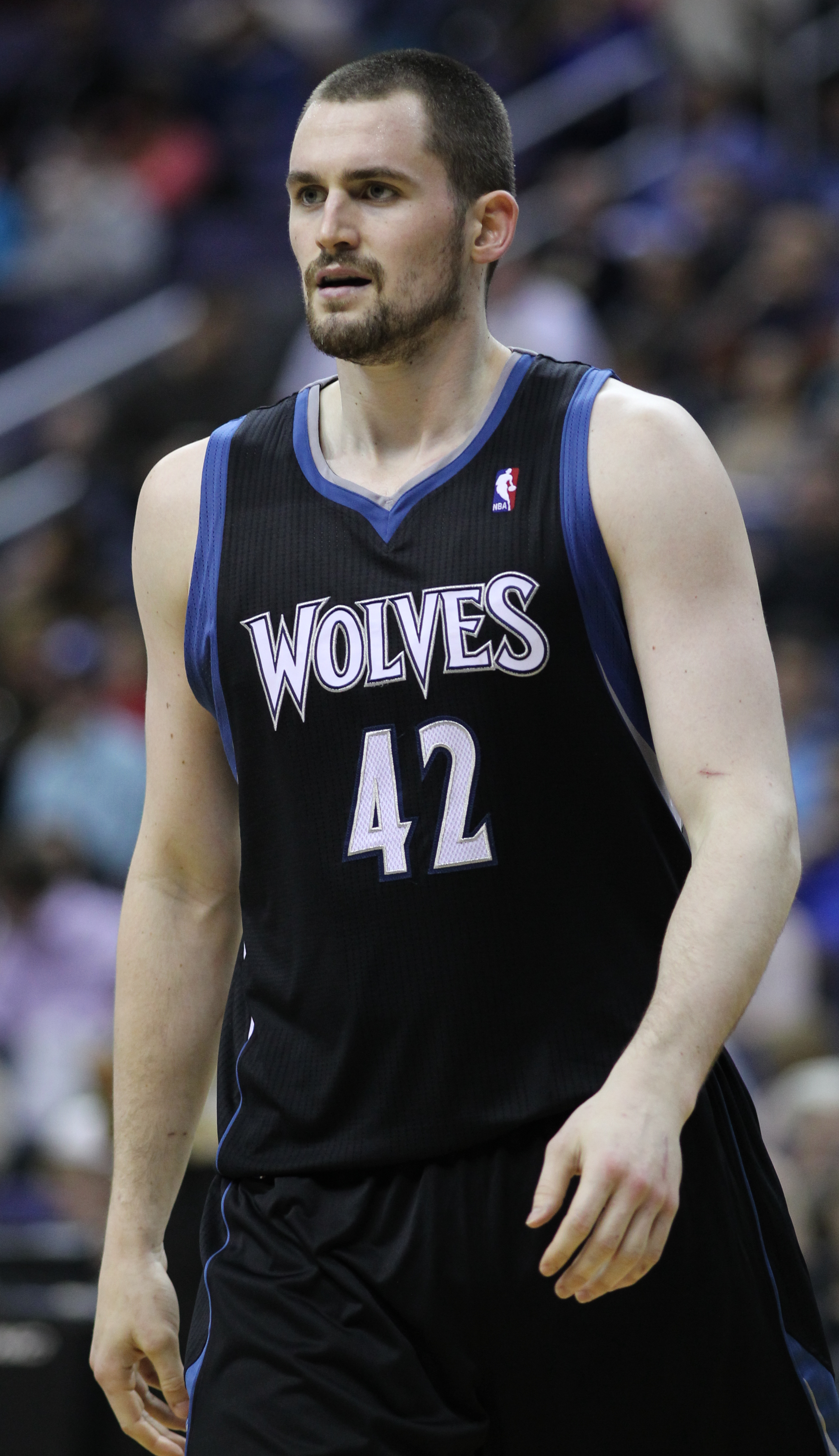
Kevin Love won in 2010–11.

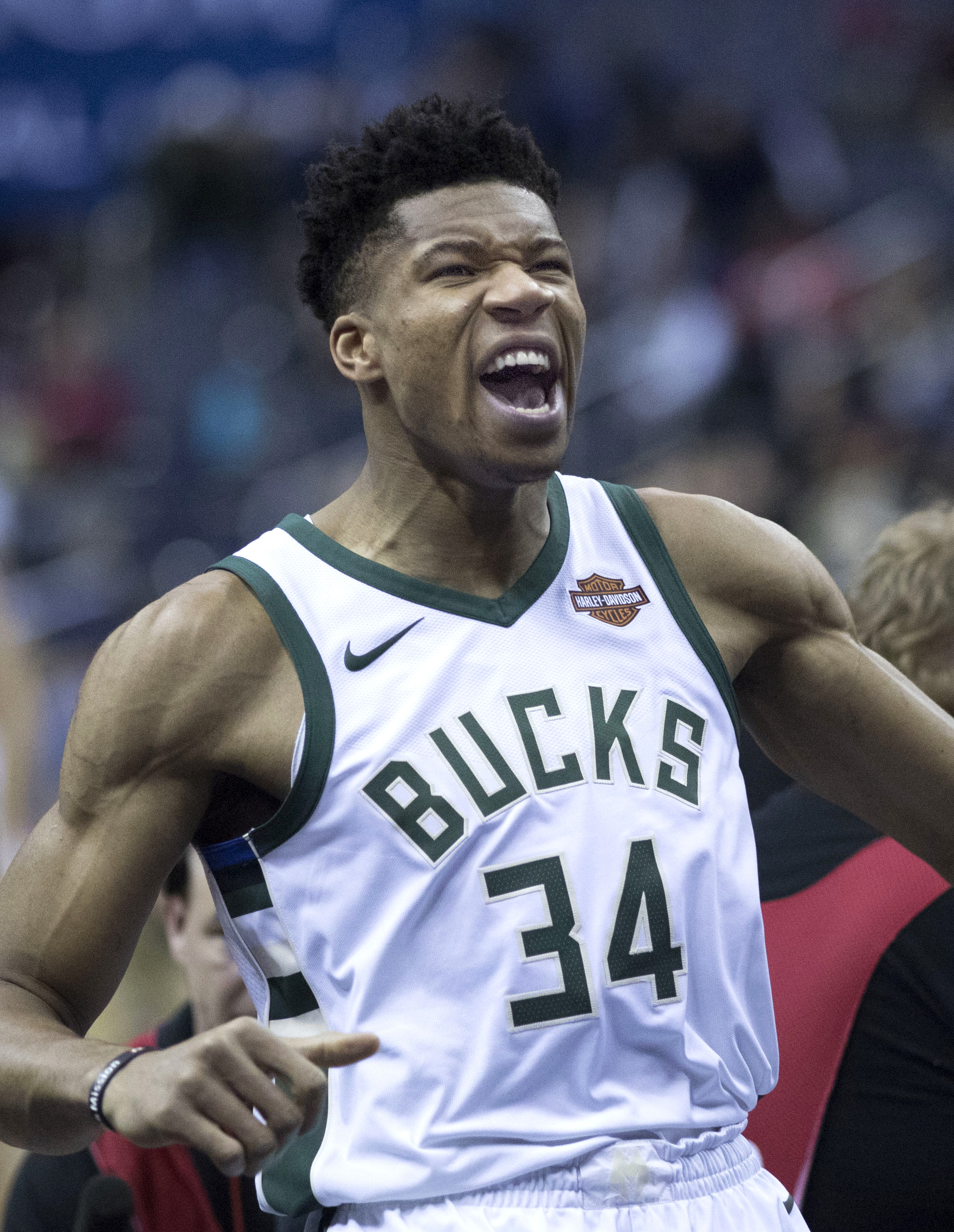
Giannis Antetokounmpo won in 2016–17.

^	Denotes player who is still active in the NBA
*	Elected to the Naismith Memorial Basketball Hall of Fame
†	Not yet eligible for Hall of Fame consideration (Note: A player is not eligible for induction into the Naismith Memorial Basketball Hall of Fame until he has been fully retired for three calendar years.)
§	1st time eligible for Hall of Fame in 2026
Team (#)	Denotes the number of times a player from this team has won

Season	Player	Position	Nationality	Team
1985–86	Alvin Robertson	Guard	United States	San Antonio Spurs
1986–87	Dale Ellis	Guard/forward	United States	Seattle SuperSonics
1987–88	Kevin Duckworth	Center	United States	Portland Trail Blazers
1988–89	Kevin Johnson	Guard	United States	Phoenix Suns
1989–90	Rony Seikaly	Center	United States (Note: Rony Seikaly was born in Lebanon and has dual citizenship in that country and the United States. He represented the United States at the 1986 FIBA World Championship.)	Miami Heat
1990–91	Scott Skiles	Guard	United States	Orlando Magic
1991–92	Pervis Ellison	Center/forward	United States	Washington Bullets
1992–93	Chris Jackson	Guard	United States	Denver Nuggets
1993–94	Don MacLean	Forward	United States	Washington Bullets (2)
1994–95	Dana Barros	Guard	United States	Philadelphia 76ers
1995–96	Gheorghe Mureșan	Center	Romania	Washington Bullets (3)
1996–97	Isaac Austin	Center	United States	Miami Heat (2)
1997–98	Alan Henderson	Forward	United States	Atlanta Hawks
1998–99	Darrell Armstrong	Guard	United States	Orlando Magic (2)
1999–00	Jalen Rose	Guard/forward	United States	Indiana Pacers
2000–01	Tracy McGrady*	Guard/forward	United States	Orlando Magic (3)
2001–02	Jermaine O'Neal	Forward/center	United States	Indiana Pacers (2)
2002–03	Gilbert Arenas	Guard	United States	Golden State Warriors
2003–04	Zach Randolph	Forward	United States	Portland Trail Blazers (2)
2004–05	Bobby Simmons	Guard/forward	United States	Los Angeles Clippers
2005–06	Boris Diaw	Forward	France	Phoenix Suns (2)
2006–07	Monta Ellis	Guard	United States	Golden State Warriors (2)
2007–08	Hedo Türkoğlu	Forward	Turkey	Orlando Magic (4)
2008–09	Danny Granger	Forward	United States	Indiana Pacers (3)
2009–10	Aaron Brooks	Guard	United States	Houston Rockets
2010–11	Kevin Love^	Forward/center	United States	Minnesota Timberwolves
2011–12	Ryan Anderson	Forward	United States	Orlando Magic (5)
2012–13	Paul George^	Forward	United States	Indiana Pacers (4)
2013–14	Goran Dragić^{§}	Guard	Slovenia	Phoenix Suns (3)
2014–15	Jimmy Butler^	Guard/forward	United States	Chicago Bulls
2015–16	CJ McCollum^	Guard	United States	Portland Trail Blazers (3)
2016–17	Giannis Antetokounmpo^	Forward	Greece	Milwaukee Bucks
2017–18	Victor Oladipo^{†}	Guard	United States	Indiana Pacers (5)
2018–19	Pascal Siakam^	Forward	Cameroon	Toronto Raptors
2019–20	Brandon Ingram^	Forward	United States	New Orleans Pelicans
2020–21	Julius Randle^	Forward	United States	New York Knicks
2021–22	Ja Morant^	Guard	United States	Memphis Grizzlies
2022–23	Lauri Markkanen^	Forward	Finland	Utah Jazz
2023–24	Tyrese Maxey^	Guard	United States	Philadelphia 76ers (2)
2024–25	Dyson Daniels^	Guard	Australia	Atlanta Hawks (2)
2025–26	Nickeil Alexander-Walker^	Guard	Canada	Atlanta Hawks (3)

== Teams ==
Awards	Teams	Years
5	Indiana Pacers	2000, 2002, 2009, 2013, 2018
5	Orlando Magic	1991, 1999, 2001, 2008, 2012
3	Washington Wizards / Washington Bullets	1992, 1994, 1996
3	Phoenix Suns	1989, 2006, 2014
3	Portland Trail Blazers	1988, 2004, 2016
3	Atlanta Hawks	1998, 2025, 2026
2	Miami Heat	1990, 1997
2	Golden State Warriors	2003, 2007
2	Philadelphia 76ers	1995, 2024
1	San Antonio Spurs	1986
1	Oklahoma City Thunder / Seattle SuperSonics	1987
1	Denver Nuggets	1993
1	Los Angeles Clippers	2005
1	Houston Rockets	2010
1	Minnesota Timberwolves	2011
1	Chicago Bulls	2015
1	Milwaukee Bucks	2017
1	Toronto Raptors	2019
1	New Orleans Pelicans	2020
1	New York Knicks	2021
1	Memphis Grizzlies	2022
1	Utah Jazz	2023
0	Brooklyn Nets	None
0	Los Angeles Lakers	None
0	Boston Celtics	None
0	Dallas Mavericks	None
0	Charlotte Hornets	None
0	Cleveland Cavaliers	None
0	Detroit Pistons	None
0	Sacramento Kings	None

== See also ==
- NBA G League Most Improved Player Award
- List of NBA regular season records
