= NBA Comeback Player of the Year =

National Basketball Association award

- Sport: Basketball
- League: National Basketball Association
- Awarded for: NBA player who demonstrates most resilience in overcoming adversity and returning to high level of play

The NBA Comeback Player of the Year was an annual National Basketball Association (NBA) award presented to a player who recovered from a subpar season after achieving success in the past. It was awarded from 1981 though 1986. (Note: There was no official award in 1980, though some sources mention Nate Archibald as the 1979–80 winner.) Along with several other awards, it was created to increase interest in the league, (Note: The Defensive Player of the Year and Sixth Man of the Year awards were introduced in 1982–83.) whose championship series in 1980 was televised live in the markets of the participants, the Los Angeles Lakers and Philadelphia 76ers, but shown on tape delay in the rest of the United States, typically after the late-night news. The Comeback Player of the Year was selected from a panel of 78 media members, three from each NBA city and another nine national media members. Three of the six winners were returning from drug or alcohol dependency issues: inaugural winner Bernard King in 1980–81 and the final two winners, Micheal Ray Richardson (1984–85) and Marques Johnson (1985–86). Two winners missed time the season prior due to a holdout: Gus Williams (1981–82) and Paul Westphal (1982–83). Westphal was also coming back from an injury, as was 1983–84 winner Adrian Dantley.

In the middle of the 1986–87 season, the NBA announced the end of the Comeback Player of the Year Award. According to league spokesman Russ Granik: "We phased it out because it became very difficult to determine with any kind of clarity exactly what the requirements were". Drugs were reportedly a reason for the award's cancellation. In addition to previous winners, candidates for the award that season included Walter Davis and John Lucas II, who had also returned from drugs. In two years, Lewis Lloyd and Mitchell Wiggins might also have been eligible for the award after having been banned for failed drug tests. Under the NBA drug program at the time, a player who tested positive for drugs three times was automatically banned from the league, and was eligible to apply for reinstatement in two years. Richardson could also have possibly qualified again that year, having become the first active NBA player to be banned by the league, following a positive test in 1986 after winning the award the previous year. In the comeback award's final season in 1985–86, the league also launched the NBA Most Improved Player Award. The criteria for selecting the most improved player award was initially open-ended, but the NBA clarified in later years that it was intended for an up-and-coming player who improved dramatically and not a player who made a comeback.

== Winners ==
Bernard King received the first award in 1981, a year after being suspended by his previous team, the Utah Jazz, following charges of sodomy, forcible sexual abuse, and possession of cocaine. After a stay at an alcohol rehabilitation center, he was traded to the Golden State Warriors, where he averaged 21.9 points per game during the season. Gus Williams won in 1982 after being named an NBA All-Star and finishing seventh in the league in scoring (23.4). He missed the entire 1980–81 season due to a contract dispute. Paul Westphal won in 1982–83, when he averaged 10 points and 5.5 assists and helped the New York Knicks qualify for the playoffs, after he missed portions of two seasons with foot injuries and contract issues. Adrian Dantley won in 1983–84 when he became a four-time All-Star and won his second NBA scoring title after missing 60 of 82 games the prior season and undergoing surgery on his injured right wrist.

Micheal Ray Richardson won the award in 1985 after earning his fourth All-Star selection, averaging a career-high 20.1 points per game, and leading the league in steals. He played in only 48 games the previous season while undergoing drug rehab and missing six other games with an ankle injury. Marques Johnson was the 1986 winner after being named an All-Star as a guard following four selections as a forward. He was traded to the Los Angeles Clippers from the Milwaukee Bucks the year before, but he had career lows in scoring and shooting. The Clippers moved him to guard in 1985–86, and he bounced back with an all-star season. Johnson went through a drug rehabilitation center four years earlier.

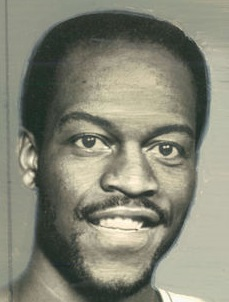
Gus Williams won in 1982 after being named an All-Star.

Key
*	Elected to the Naismith Memorial Basketball Hall of Fame

Winners
Season	Player	Position	Team
1980–81	Bernard King*	Forward	Golden State Warriors
1981–82	Gus Williams	Guard	Seattle SuperSonics
1982–83	Paul Westphal*	Guard	New York Knicks
1983–84	Adrian Dantley*	Forward	Utah Jazz
1984–85	Micheal Ray Richardson	Guard	New Jersey Nets
1985–86	Marques Johnson	Guard	Los Angeles Clippers
