= Reggie Miller =

American basketball player (born 1965)

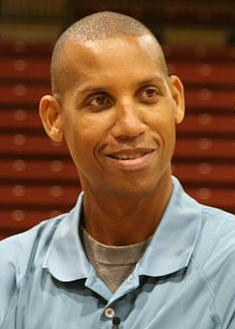
- Miller in 2010

Personal information
- Born: August 24, 1965 (age 61) Riverside, California, U.S.
- Listed height: 6 ft 7 in (2.01 m)
- Listed weight: 195 lb (88 kg)

Career information
- High school: Riverside Polytechnic (Riverside, California)
- College: UCLA (1983–1987)
- NBA draft: 1987: 1st round, 11th overall pick
- Drafted by: Indiana Pacers
- Playing career: 1987–2005
- Position: Shooting guard
- Number: 31

Career history
- 1987–2005: Indiana Pacers

Career highlights
- 5× NBA All-Star (1990, 1995, 1996, 1998, 2000); 3× All-NBA Third Team (1995, 1996, 1998); NBA 75th Anniversary Team; No. 31 retired by Indiana Pacers; NIT (1985); Third-team All-American – UPI (1986); 2× First-team All-Pac-10 (1986, 1987); Pac-10 tournament MVP (1987); No. 31 retired by UCLA Bruins; USA Basketball Male Athlete of the Year (2002)

Career NBA statistics
- Points: 25,279 (18.2 ppg)
- Rebounds: 4,182 (3.0 rpg)
- Assists: 4,141 (3.0 apg)
- Stats at NBA.com
- Stats at Basketball Reference
- Basketball Hall of Fame
- FIBA Hall of Fame
Medals
Men's basketball
Representing the United States
Olympic Games
Gold medal – first place	1996 Atlanta	Men's basketball
FIBA World Championship
Gold medal – first place	1994 Canada	Men's basketball

Reginald Wayne Miller (born August 24, 1965) is an American former professional basketball player who played his entire 18-year career in the National Basketball Association (NBA) with the Indiana Pacers. Widely recognized as one of the greatest shooters in NBA history, he was known for his precision three-point shooting, especially in pressure situations and most notably against the New York Knicks, for which he earned the nickname "Knick Killer". A five-time All-Star selection, Miller was inducted into the Naismith Memorial Basketball Hall of Fame in 2012 and named to the NBA 75th Anniversary Team in 2021.

Miller played college basketball for the UCLA Bruins, earning third-team All-American honors as a junior in 1986. He was selected by Indiana in the first round of the 1987 NBA draft with the 11th overall pick. When he retired from playing, Miller held the NBA record for most career 3-point field goals made. As of 2026, his 2,560 three-pointers ranked seventh on the all-time list, behind Stephen Curry, James Harden, Ray Allen, Damian Lillard, Klay Thompson, and LeBron James. Miller led the league in free throw percentage five times and won a gold medal in the 1996 Summer Olympics. His jersey number 31 was retired by the Pacers in 2006. Miller is widely regarded as the Pacers' greatest player of all time. After his playing career, he became an NBA commentator for TNT and college basketball analyst for CBS Sports.

== Early life ==
Miller was born in Riverside, California, and attended Riverside Polytechnic High School. He was born with hip deformities, which prevented him from walking correctly. After a few years of continuously wearing braces on both legs, his leg strength grew enough to compensate.

One of five siblings, he comes from an athletic family. His brother Darrell is a former Major League Baseball player; his sister Tammy played volleyball at Cal State Fullerton; and his older sister Cheryl is also a Hall of Fame basketball player. Cheryl was a member of the 1984 U.S. gold medal-winning Olympic basketball team and is an analyst for Turner Sports.

One of the family anecdotes Reggie likes to recall was when Cheryl used to beat him in games of 1-on-1 prior to his professional career. According to Reggie, they quit playing when he could finally block Cheryl's shots. Miller says his unorthodox shooting style was developed to arc his shot over his sister's constant shot blocking.

His brother, Saul Jr., became a musician and followed in his father's footsteps in military service.

== College ==
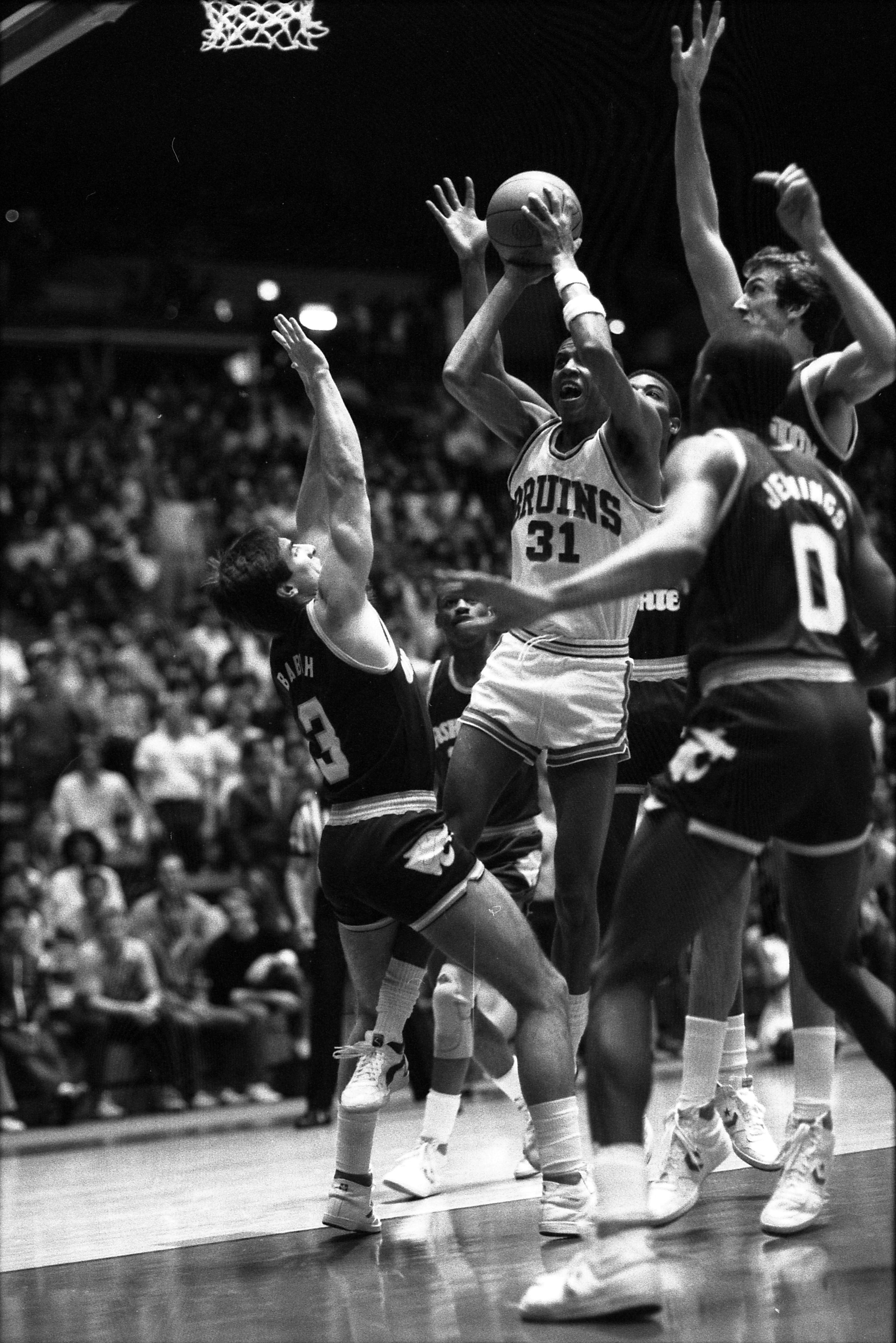
Miller with the ball against Washington State University, 1985

Miller attended the University of California, Los Angeles (UCLA), where he received a degree in history. In the 1984–85 NCAA season he helped the UCLA Bruins to an NIT championship. In Miller's senior season, 1986–87, he was an All-Pac-10 selection for the second straight year, and led the Bruins to a Pacific-10 regular-season championship and the first Pac-10 tournament championship.

The three-point field goal was added for the 1986–87 season; 69 of Miller's 247 field goals that year were three-pointers. One of his most memorable performances was in the January 24, 1987, game against the Notre Dame Fighting Irish, where he hit a 24-foot (7.3 m) shot to put the Bruins ahead 62–59 with 10 seconds left. Another notable game was a win against defending national champion Louisville and Pervis Ellison on February 28, 1987, where Miller scored 33 points in the second half, which is still the school record.

Miller's final game was a loss in the second round of the 1987 NCAA Men's Division I Basketball Tournament to Wyoming. He finished second in all-time scoring at UCLA behind only Kareem Abdul-Jabbar.

As of 2009, Miller still holds the UCLA single-season records for most league points, highest league scoring average, and most free throws. He also holds several individual game records. UCLA retired his No. 31 jersey in 2013, and he was inducted into the Pac-12 Conference Hall of Honor in 2010.

== Professional career ==
=== Early career (1987–1993) ===
Miller was selected by the Pacers with the 11th pick in the first round of the 1987 NBA draft. Fans were initially upset that the Pacers chose Miller over New Castle, Indiana, native Steve Alford; fans watching the 1987 NBA draft booed Pacers President Donnie Walsh for the selection. Miller wore jersey number 31 while playing for the Pacers, backing up shooting guard John Long before he became a starter. Miller gained a respectable reputation early in his career as he led the Indiana Pacers to become a perennial playoff team.

After Chuck Person was traded from the Pacers during the 1992 offseason, Miller established himself as the Pacers' primary scoring threat. On November 28, 1992, he scored a career-high 57 points against the Charlotte Hornets in a 134–122 win at Charlotte Coliseum. In this game, Miller hit 16 of 29 field goals, 4 of 11 3-pointers, and 21 of 23 free throws. The 57 points he scored was the second-highest total in the NBA during the 1992–93 season (only Michael Jordan's 64 against Orlando on January 16 was higher), and still stands today as the Pacers' NBA franchise team record, although George McGinnis holds the Pacers all-time franchise record with 58 points in an ABA game.

=== Mid-career (1993–2000) ===
Miller became a household name during the 1994 Eastern Conference Finals against the Knicks, due to a phenomenal shooting performance in Game 5 on June 1, 1994, in which he scored 39 points (25 in the fourth quarter alone) in the Pacers' 93–86 victory at Madison Square Garden. Miller made several long 3-pointers during the quarter and engaged in an animated discussion of his ongoing performance with noted Knicks fan Spike Lee, who was, as always, seated courtside. The win gave the Pacers a 3–2 series lead over the heavily favored Knicks, but they lost the next two games and the series.

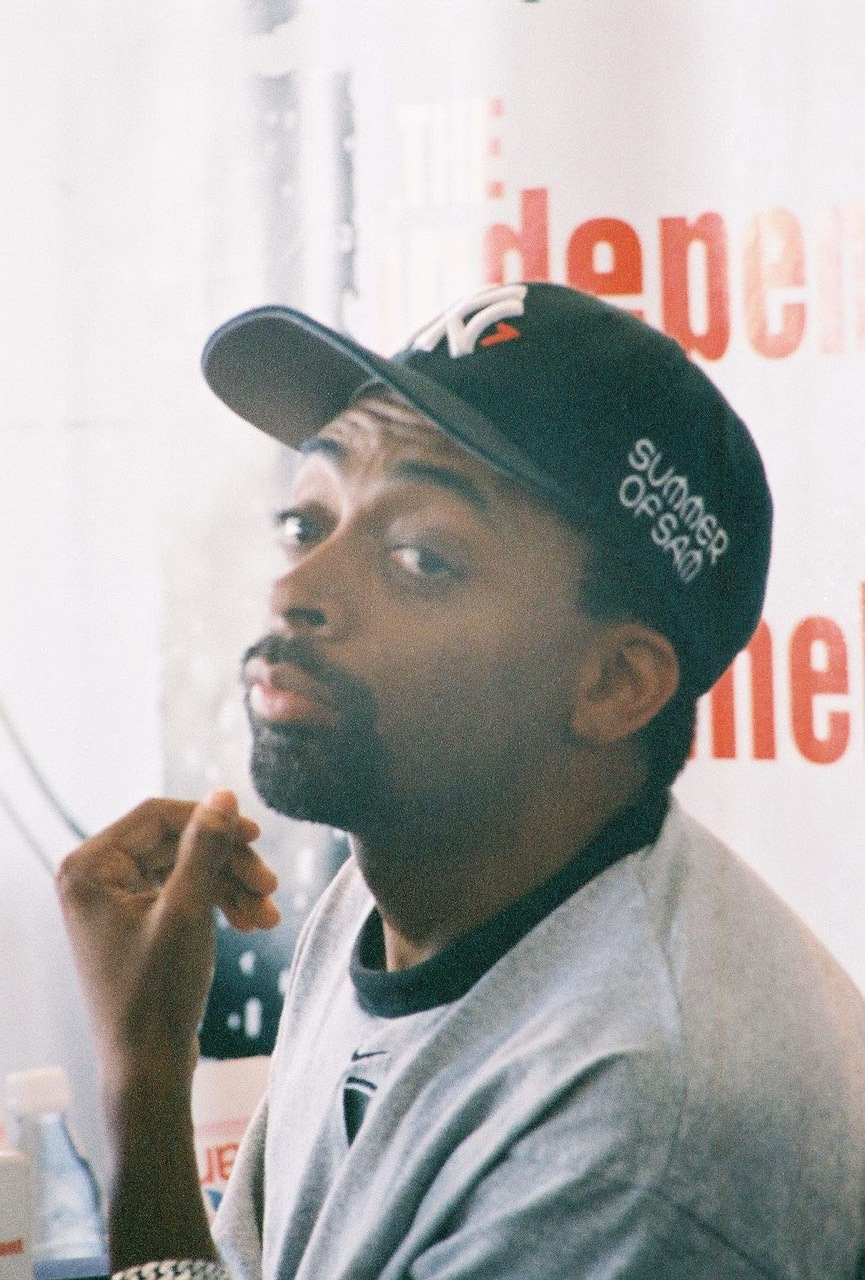
Miller's public feud with film director Spike Lee (pictured) generated controversy for several years in the NBA playoffs.

==== "Eight points in nine seconds" ====
On May 7, 1995, Miller scored eight unanswered points in 8.9 seconds in Game 1 of the Eastern Conference Semifinals against the Knicks, leading the Pacers to a 107–105 victory. With 18.7 seconds remaining and the Pacers trailing 105–99, Miller took the inbound pass from Mark Jackson, made a 3-pointer, stole the inbound pass from Anthony Mason, dribbled back behind the arc and tied the game with another 3, stunning the crowd at Madison Square Garden. On the ensuing possession, Knicks guard John Starks was fouled by Sam Mitchell. Starks missed both free throws, and although Patrick Ewing managed to get the offensive rebound, his shot was just a bit long and hit the back rim. Miller got the rebound and was fouled with 7.5 seconds left. He made both free throws. Trailing by 2, New York had one last chance to win the game but failed to get a shot off, giving the Pacers a shocking 1–0 lead in the best-of-seven series.

The Pacers outlasted the Knicks in seven games before losing to the Orlando Magic in the Conference Finals in seven games, just like the previous year against the Knicks.

Near the end of the 1996 season, Miller fell to the floor and suffered an eye injury, leaving him unable to play in the playoffs until Game 5 of the first round against the Atlanta Hawks, where he wore goggles until the Pacers were eliminated. Around this time, Miller hosted a talk show on WTHR called The Reggie Miller Show.

Following the 1996 season, Miller became a free agent for the first time, and after lengthy negotiations that lasted right up until the start of training camp in late September, the Pacers and Miller eventually agreed on a 4-year, $36 million contract.

After missing the playoffs in the 1997 season, the Pacers returned to the postseason in 1998. They defeated the Cleveland Cavaliers and Knicks en route to the Eastern Conference Finals, where they faced Michael Jordan and the defending champion Bulls. On May 25, 1998, the Pacers trailed Chicago 2–1 in the series and were behind 94–93 in Game 4 at home in Market Square Arena with 2.9 seconds left. Miller got free from Jordan, caught the inbound pass from Derrick McKey, turned and made a game-winning 3-pointer with 0.7 seconds to go. The Pacers eventually pushed the series to Game 7 in Chicago, where the Pacers led in the fourth quarter before fading in the final two minutes. The Bulls won 88–83 and went on to win their sixth and final championship of the Michael Jordan/Scottie Pippen era.

With Jordan retired, Miller and the Pacers were considered a favorite in the East heading into the lockout-shortened 1999 season. After earning the No. 2 seed in the East, the Pacers once again met the Knicks in the Eastern Conference Finals, where the eighth-seeded Knicks upset the Pacers in six games. In the decisive sixth game, Miller had one of the worst performances of his career, scoring just eight points on 3-of-18 shooting from the field. He missed all but one of his eight 3-point attempts.

==== NBA Finals appearance ====
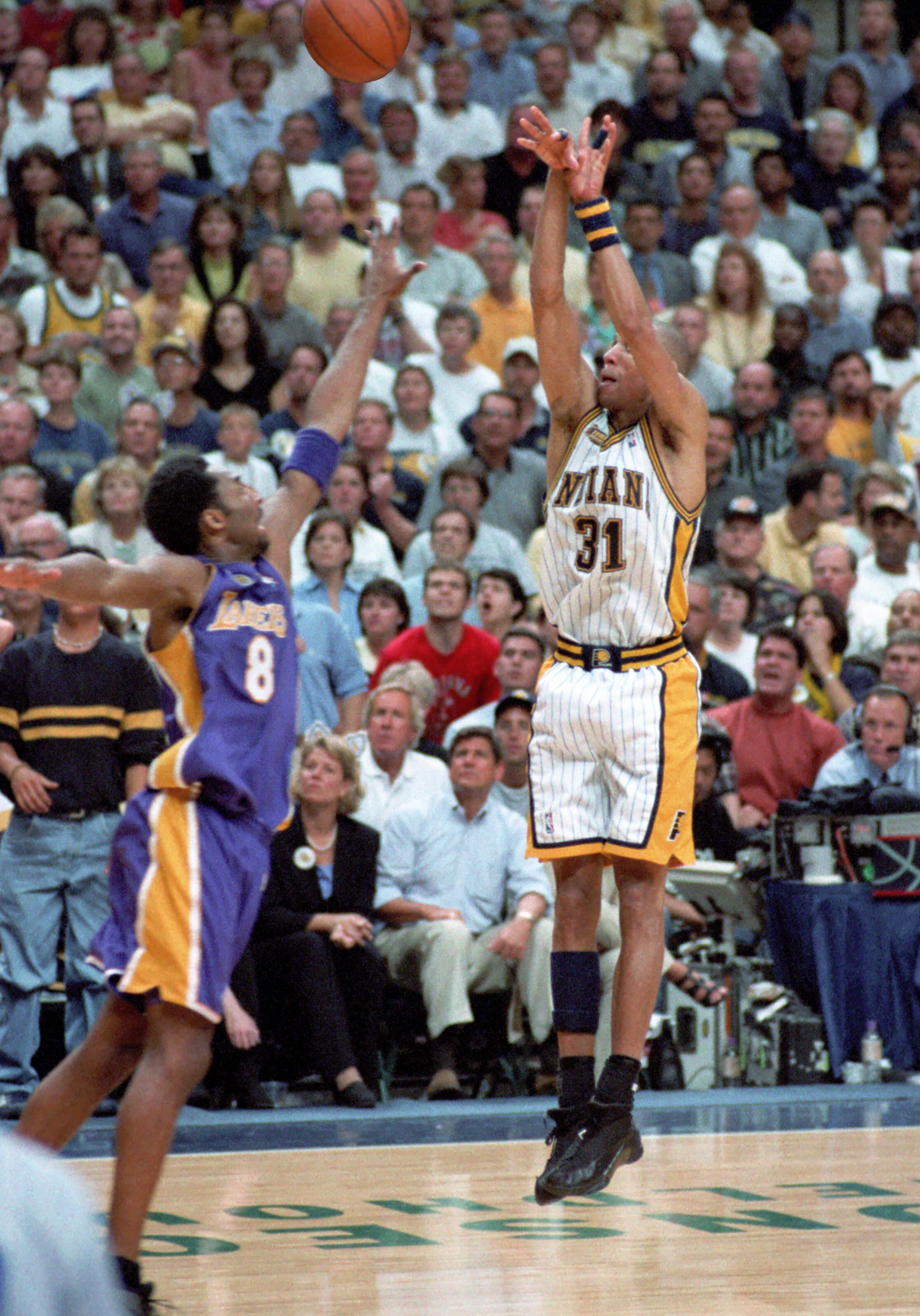
Miller (right) taking a shot over Kobe Bryant during Game 5 of the 2000 NBA Finals.

In Game 1 of the Eastern Conference Semifinals against the Philadelphia 76ers on May 6, 2000, Miller and teammate Jalen Rose each scored 40 points, becoming the highest-scoring pair of teammates in playoff history, in the Pacers' 108–91 victory. The Pacers won that series 4–2 and returned to the Eastern Conference Finals for the fifth time in seven years. This time they finally broke through, defeating the rival Knicks 4–2. Game 6 at Madison Square Garden on June 2, 2000, was sealed by Miller's 34 points, with 17 coming in the fourth quarter to help Indiana clinch the series with a 93–80 victory over the Knicks.

The Pacers advanced to the NBA Finals for the first time in franchise history, facing the Los Angeles Lakers led by Shaquille O'Neal and Kobe Bryant. The Pacers lost the series 4–2 as Miller averaged 24.3 points per game for the series.

Following the Finals, Miller became a free agent again, and would re-sign on a 3-year, $36 million contract.

=== Later career and retirement (2000–2005) ===
The Pacers struggled the next year, falling to the 8th seed in the East. In Game 1 of the First Round of the playoffs against the 76ers, Miller hit the game-winning three with 2.9 seconds left to secure a 79–78 victory. The eventual Eastern Conference champion 76ers took the next three games to give the Pacers a quick exit.

In 2002, Miller almost single-handedly eliminated the top seed and eventual Eastern Conference Champion New Jersey Nets in the fifth and final game of the first round of the playoffs. After New Jersey's Richard Jefferson missed two free throws, Miller sent the game into overtime by banking in a 40-foot (12 m) three-pointer at the buzzer. With the Pacers down by two points in the final seconds of the first overtime, Miller drove into the lane and dunked over three Nets defenders to send the game into a second overtime. The Pacers lost to the Nets 120–109, but Miller burnished his record as a clutch performer.

In the twilight of his career, Miller deferred team leadership to All-Star teammate Jermaine O'Neal, who urged his teammates to "win one [a championship] for 'Uncle Reg'". While Miller was no longer the team's leading scorer, he remained a go-to player in crunch time. O'Neal demonstrated his respect for Miller on January 4, 2005, when he scored 55 points against the Milwaukee Bucks and then left the game with 1:43 remaining to preserve Miller's 57-point record.

In 2005, following the lengthy suspensions of star teammates O'Neal, Stephen Jackson, and Ron Artest for a brawl with fans in Detroit, Miller averaged nearly 20 points per game for stretches of the season. He scored 39 points against the Los Angeles Lakers on March 18 at the age of 39. In January, Miller angrily shot down rumors that he would retire at the end of the season, saying that if he did decide to retire, he would announce it through his sister Cheryl. On February 10, Cheryl, now a sideline reporter for TNT, reported that her brother had told her the previous day that he would indeed retire.

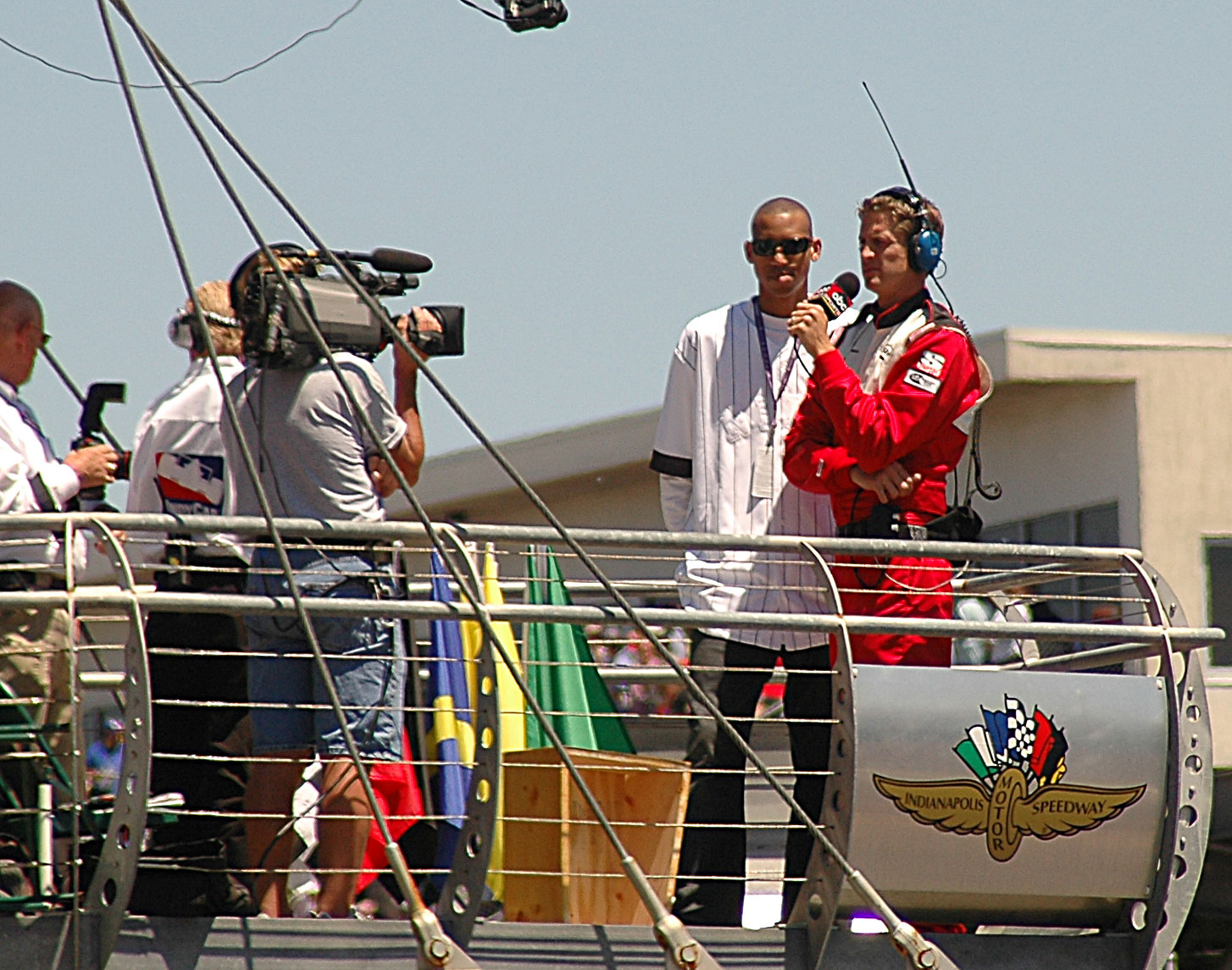
Miller, before waving the green flag at the 2005 Indianapolis 500, days after his final game with the Pacers

On April 11, in a game against the Toronto Raptors, Miller passed Jerry West to move into 12th on the NBA's all-time scoring list.

Miller's last game was on May 19, 2005, at Conseco Fieldhouse, when the Pacers lost 88–79 to the Detroit Pistons in the Eastern Conference Semifinals, ending the series 4–2. In the game, Miller led the Pacers with 27 points, making 11 out of 16 field goals including four of eight three-pointers. When he was taken out with 15.7 seconds to play, the Indianapolis crowd gave him a final standing ovation. Then-Pistons coach (and former Pacers coach) Larry Brown called an additional timeout during which the Pistons players joined in the ovation, a moment which provided closure to Miller's career and to a season that had been overshadowed by the brawl between the two teams. This won the 2005 Best Moment ESPY Award.

Over his 18-year NBA career, Miller made over $105 million in salary, playing in 1,389 games for the Pacers. He is one of seven NBA players who spent an entire career of 18 or more seasons with a single franchise. He is widely recognized as one of the greatest shooters in NBA history. Miller is one of only nine players to join the 50–40–90 club and has made 2,560 3-pointers in his career, which was an NBA record at the time of his retirement. His record was later broken by Ray Allen, who was later surpassed by Stephen Curry. To commemorate the NBA's 75th Anniversary The Athletic ranked their top 75 players of all time, and named Miller as the 47th greatest player in NBA history.

== Professional career statistics ==
Legend
GP	Games played	GS	Games started	MPG	Minutes per game
FG%	Field goal percentage	3P%	3-point field goal percentage	FT%	Free throw percentage
RPG	Rebounds per game	APG	Assists per game	SPG	Steals per game
BPG	Blocks per game	PPG	Points per game	**Bold**	Career high
*	Led the league

=== Regular season ===
Year	Team	GP	GS	MPG	FG%	3P%	FT%	RPG	APG	SPG	BPG	PPG
1987–88	Indiana	**82**	1	22.4	.488	.355	.801	2.3	1.6	.6	.2	10.0
1988–89	Indiana	74	70	34.3	.479	.402	.844	**3.9**	3.1	1.3	**.4**	16.0
1989–90	Indiana	**82***	**82***	38.9	**.514**	.414	.868	3.6	3.8	1.3	.2	**24.6**
1990–91	Indiana	**82***	**82***	36.2	.512	.348	.918*	3.4	**4.0**	1.3	.2	22.6
1991–92	Indiana	**82**	**82**	38.0	.501	.378	.858	**3.9**	3.8	1.3	.3	20.7
1992–93	Indiana	**82**	**82**	36.0	.479	.399	.880	3.1	3.2	**1.5**	.3	21.2
1993–94	Indiana	79	79	33.4	.503	.421	.908	2.7	3.1	**1.5**	.3	19.9
1994–95	Indiana	81	81	32.9	.462	.415	.897	2.6	3.0	1.2	.2	19.6
1995–96	Indiana	76	76	34.5	.473	.410	.863	2.8	3.3	1.0	.2	21.1
1996–97	Indiana	81	81	36.6	.444	.427	.880	3.5	3.4	.9	.3	21.6
1997–98	Indiana	81	81	34.5	.477	**.429**	.868	2.9	2.1	1.0	.1	19.5
1998–99	Indiana	50*	50*	35.7	.438	.385	.915*	2.7	2.2	.7	.2	18.4
1999–00	Indiana	81	81	36.9	.448	.408	.919	3.0	2.3	1.0	.3	18.1
2000–01	Indiana	81	81	**39.3**	.440	.366	.928*	3.5	3.2	1.0	.2	18.9
2001–02	Indiana	79	79	36.6	.453	.406	.911*	2.8	3.2	1.1	.1	16.5
2002–03	Indiana	70	70	30.2	.441	.355	.900	2.5	2.4	.9	.1	12.6
2003–04	Indiana	80	80	28.2	.438	.401	.885	2.4	3.1	.8	.1	10.0
2004–05	Indiana	66	66	31.9	.437	.322	**.933***	2.4	2.2	.8	.1	14.8
Career		1,389	1,304	34.3	.471	.395	.888	3.0	3.0	1.1	.2	18.2
All-Star		5	1	19.2	.457	.263	.750	1.0	2.0	1.0	.2	8.0

=== Playoffs ===
Year	Team	GP	GS	MPG	FG%	3P%	FT%	RPG	APG	SPG	BPG	PPG
1990	Indiana	3	3	41.7	.571	.429	.905	4.0	2.0	1.0	.0	20.7
1991	Indiana	5	5	38.6	.486	.421	.865	3.2	2.8	**1.6**	.4	21.6
1992	Indiana	3	3	43.3	**.581**	**.636***	.800	2.3	**4.7**	1.3	.0	27.0
1993	Indiana	4	4	43.8	.533	.526	**.947**	3.0	2.8	.8	.0	**31.5**
1994	Indiana	16	16	36.0	.448	.422	.839	3.0	2.9	1.3	.2	23.2
1995	Indiana	17	17	37.7	.476	.422	.860	3.6	2.1	.9	.2	25.5
1996	Indiana	1	1	31.0	.412	.333	.867	1.0	1.0	1.0	.0	29.0
1998	Indiana	16	16	39.3	.426	.400	.904	1.8	2.0	1.2	.2	19.9
1999	Indiana	13	13	37.0	.397	.333	.895	3.9	2.6	.7	.2	20.2
2000	Indiana	**22**	**22**	40.5	.452	.395	.938	2.4	2.7	1.0	.4	24.0
2001	Indiana	4	4	**44.3**	.456	.429	.933	**5.0**	2.5	.8	**.5**	31.3
2002	Indiana	5	5	39.6	.506	.419	.875	3.2	2.8	**1.6**	.2	23.6
2003	Indiana	6	6	29.3	.283	.160	.913	2.3	2.3	.2	.2	9.2
2004	Indiana	16	16	28.4	.402	.375	.922	2.3	2.8	1.1	.2	10.1
2005	Indiana	13	13	33.1	.434	.318	.941	3.1	1.5	.8	.1	14.8
Career		144	144	36.9	.449	.390	.893	2.9	2.5	1.0	.2	20.6

== National team career ==
Miller was a member of two gold medal-winning teams, the US national team for the 1994 FIBA World Championship and the Olympic men's basketball team in 1996. He averaged 17.1 points, 52.6% shooting, and was 19 for 20 from free throws and was second-leading scorer behind Shaquille O'Neal in the 1994 tournament. In 1996, he averaged 11.4 points and had the second-highest total points (91). He started 5 out of the 8 games and shared the shooting guard rotation with Mitch Richmond. He did not return to the USA Team until the 2002 FIBA World Championship. The 2002 team did not win that year's championship, losing to FR Yugoslavia in the quarterfinals. The tournament marked the first time that NBA players competed against international competition and lost. Miller was injured during the 2002 World Championships and played limited minutes.

== Off the court ==
Reggie Miller
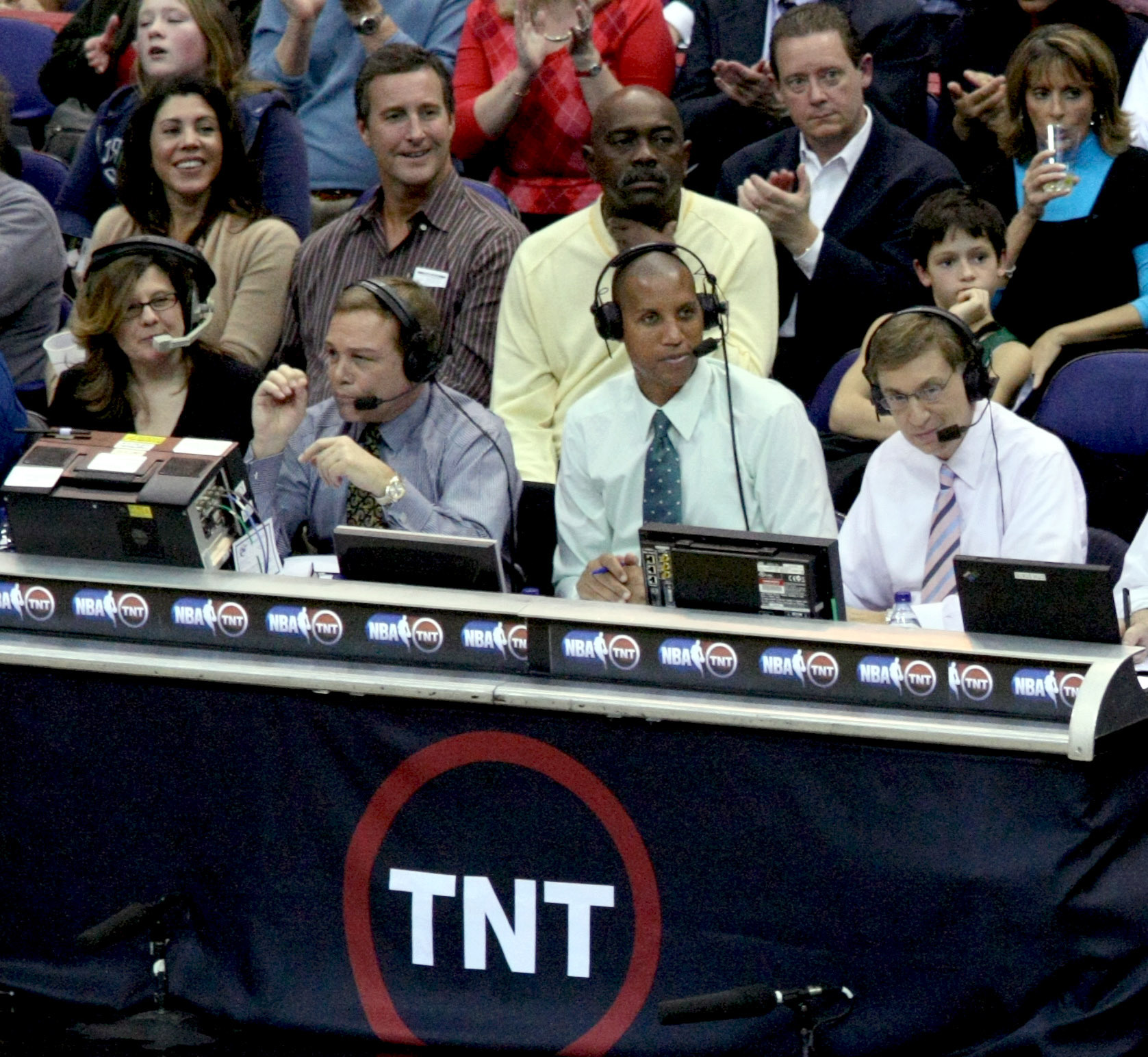
- Miller working an NBA on TNT telecast with Mike Fratello (left) and Marv Albert (right).
- Years active: 2005–present
- Sports commentary career
- Genre: color commentator
- Sports: NBA, NCAA men's basketball
- Employer: NBA on TNT (2005–2025); NBA on NBC Sports (2025–present)

Miller served as the 2005 Indianapolis 500 Festival Parade Grand Marshal. Archbishop Daniel M. Buechlein, OSB of the Archdiocese of Indianapolis opened the day with the prayer "Keep these drivers safe and God bless Reggie!" before Miller waved the green flag to start the race.

In August 2005, Miller announced his plans to join TNT as an NBA analyst; his sister, Cheryl is an NBA sideline reporter for the network. Miller once served as guest host of the network television talk show Live with Regis and Kelly, filling in for host Regis Philbin. Miller is currently a host on TNT's NBA coverage and also answers "Reggie's Mailbag".

Miller's number 31 was retired at halftime in a ceremony on March 30, 2006, at Conseco Fieldhouse.

In June 2005, Miller also became a weekly contributor to The Dan Patrick Show on ESPN Radio, providing the show with commentary. Beginning in 2011, Miller has worked as a TV analyst for the NCAA Division I Men's Basketball Championship tournament.

Miller currently splits his time between residences in Malibu, California, and Fishers, Indiana. Miller previously put his 15,000-square-foot (1,400 m^{2}) Fishers mansion, located on Geist Reservoir, up for sale for $7.5 million. The listing has since been removed without Miller selling the residence.

On August 8, 2007, Boston Celtics general manager Danny Ainge and head coach Doc Rivers discussed with him about joining their revamped roster including Kevin Garnett, Ray Allen, and longtime Celtic Paul Pierce in a reserve role. On August 12, his former coach Rick Carlisle was quoted as saying "we (Miller and I) talked about it and agreed that it was something that deserved careful consideration." On August 24, 2007, his 42nd birthday, Miller decided against any comeback, stating: "Physically, I know I could have done it. But mentally, when you do something like this, you've either got to be all in or all out. And I've decided I'm all out."

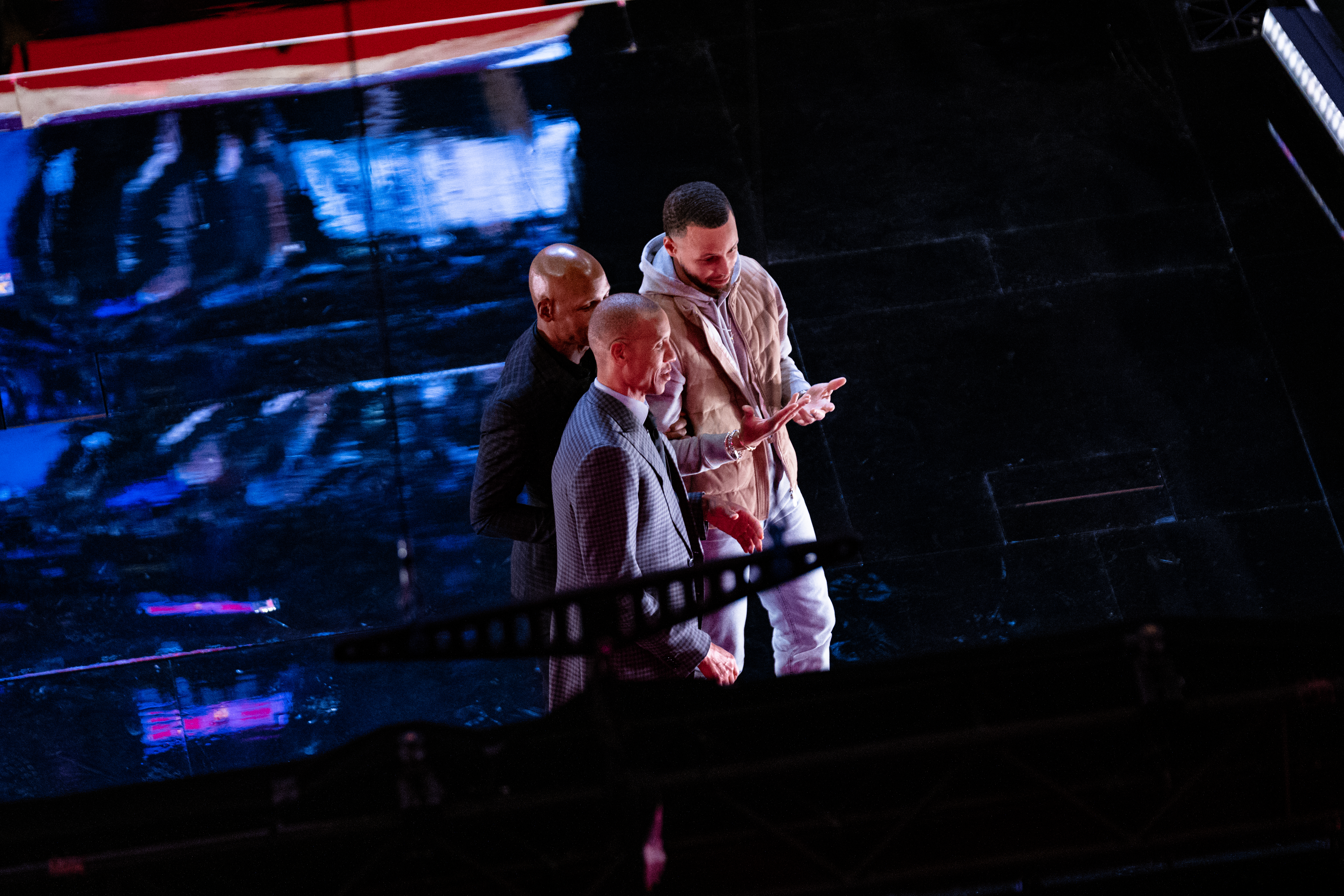
Miller with Ray Allen and Steph Curry, recognized as the three greatest shooters in NBA history

A documentary titled Winning Time: Reggie Miller vs. the New York Knicks premiered to the public on March 14, 2010, on ESPN. Miller announced in December 2009 that there would be a Special Premiere Movie event on Friday, Feb 26, at Conseco Fieldhouse. The documentary was directed by Peabody Award-winner Dan Klores.

During his career, he performed a voice role in the Disney-animated TV series Hercules; after retirement, he appeared in a comedy role in Uncle Drew in 2018 and appeared in the seventeenth season of the American reality competition television series Hell's Kitchen as one of the guest celebrity athletes assigned to contestants to serve as culinary students.

Since his retirement, Miller has become an avid cyclist and participates in events across disciplines (road, mountain bike, and gravel). In December 2020, he was voted onto the USA Cycling Board of Directors.

In 2025, Miller joined NBC as a game analyst for its NBA coverage. He joined NBC after having been at TNT, which had lost live NBA game rights, since 2005. Miller is the lead color commentator and is paired with Mike Tirico.

== Achievements ==
- Miller played more games with the same team than all but five players in NBA history: John Stockton and Karl Malone of the Utah Jazz, Kobe Bryant with the Los Angeles Lakers, Tim Duncan with the San Antonio Spurs, and Dirk Nowitzki with the Dallas Mavericks. (On this list, only Malone played for another team, joining the Los Angeles Lakers in his final season.) Only ten other players have played in more total regular season NBA games than Miller. Over the course of his career, Miller scored 25,279 points (14th on all-time scoring list), with an average of 18.2 points per game. He shot .471 from the field, .395 from 3-point range and .888 from the free-throw line.
- Miller made the All-NBA Third Team three times throughout his career and received his only MVP votes in 1998 and 2000.
- Miller was the first Indiana Pacer to start in an NBA All-Star Game, doing so in 1995. He was also selected to the team in 1990, 1996, 1998 and 2000.
- Miller retired as the all-time NBA leader in total 3-point field goals made (2,560) (broken February 10, 2011, by Ray Allen while with the Boston Celtics).
- Miller led the league twice in three-point field goals made (1992–93, 1996–97).
- Miller made a three-pointer in 68 consecutive games from November 15, 1996, to April 6, 1997.
- Miller led the league in free throw percentage five times (1990–91, 1998–99, 2000–01, 2001–02, 2004–05)
- Miller is one of only nine members in the 50–40–90 club of players who shot 50% or better from the field, 40% or better from three-point range, and 90% or better from the free-throw line in a single season while also achieving the NBA league minimum number of makes in each category. Larry Bird, Mark Price, Steve Nash, Dirk Nowitzki, Kevin Durant, Stephen Curry, Malcolm Brogdon and Kyrie Irving are the only other players to achieve this feat.
- Miller ranks second all-time in 30-point playoff games against the New York Knicks, with nine, trailing only Michael Jordan, with 15.
- Inducted into the Naismith Memorial Basketball Hall of Fame in 2012
- Miller was honored as one of the league's greatest players of all time by being named to the NBA 75th Anniversary Team.

== See also ==
- List of National Basketball Association annual free throw percentage leaders
- List of National Basketball Association career games played leaders
- List of National Basketball Association career scoring leaders
- List of National Basketball Association franchise career scoring leaders
- List of National Basketball Association career 3-point scoring leaders
- List of National Basketball Association career free throw percentage leaders
- List of National Basketball Association career free throw scoring leaders
- List of National Basketball Association career minutes played leaders
- List of National Basketball Association career playoff scoring leaders
- List of National Basketball Association career playoff 3-point scoring leaders
- List of National Basketball Association career playoff free throw scoring leaders
- List of NBA players who have spent their entire career with one franchise
