= Sidney Wicks =

American basketball player (born 1949)

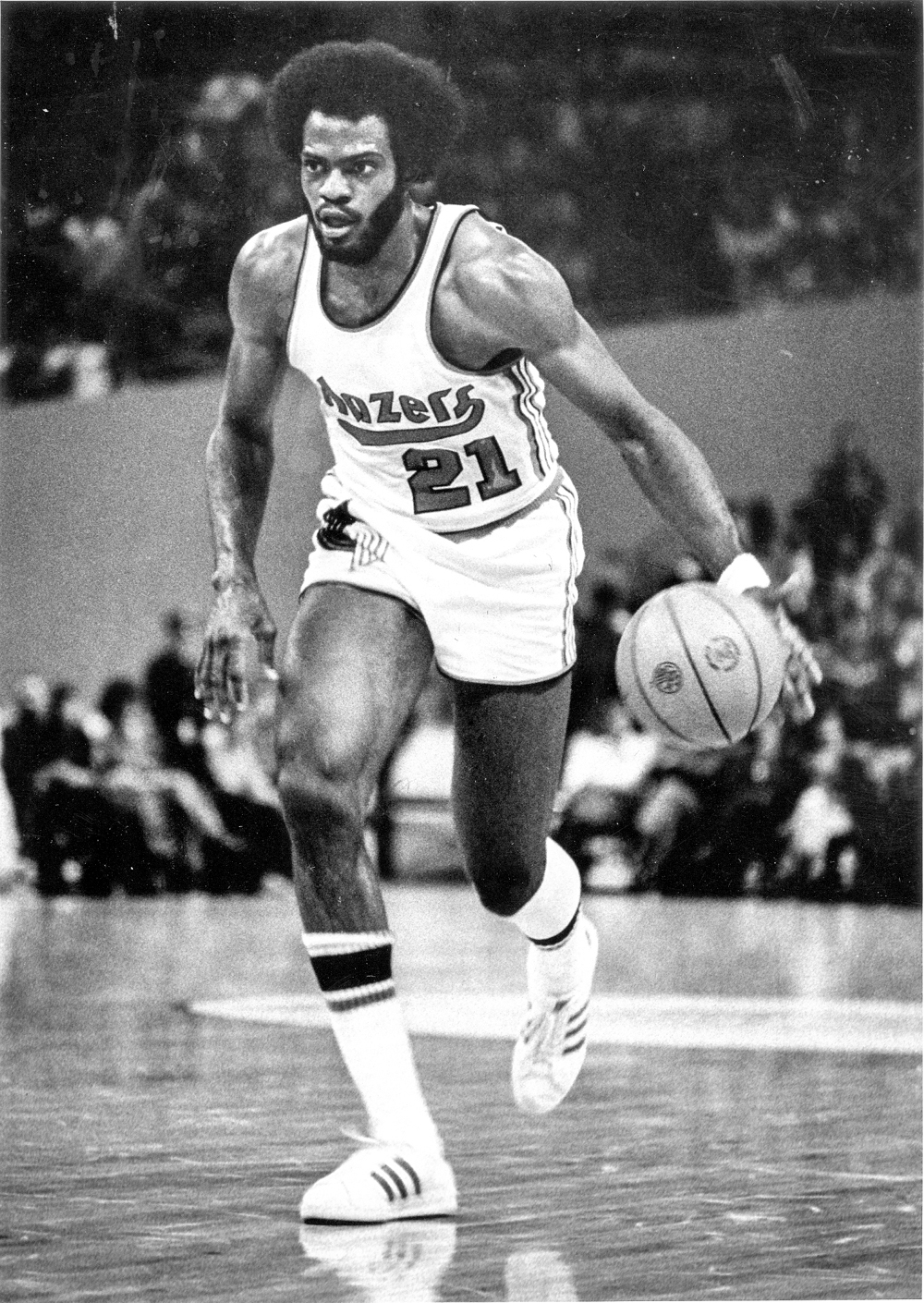
- Wicks with the Portland Trail Blazers in 1972

Personal information
- Born: September 19, 1949 (age 77) Contra Costa County, California, U.S.
- Listed height: 6 ft 9 in (2.06 m)
- Listed weight: 225 lb (102 kg)

Career information
- High school: Alexander Hamilton (Los Angeles, California)
- College: Santa Monica (1967–1968); UCLA (1968–1971)
- NBA draft: 1971: 1st round, 2nd overall pick
- Drafted by: Portland Trail Blazers
- Playing career: 1971–1982
- Position: Power forward
- Number: 21, 12

Career history
- 1971–1976: Portland Trail Blazers
- 1976–1978: Boston Celtics
- 1978–1981: San Diego Clippers
- 1981–1982: Reyer Venezia Mestre

Career highlights
- 4× NBA All-Star (1972–1975); NBA Rookie of the Year (1972); NBA All-Rookie First Team (1972); 3× NCAA champion (1969–1971); NCAA Final Four MOP (1970); Sporting News Player of the Year (1971); USBWA Player of the Year (1971); 2× Helms Foundation Player of the Year (1970, 1971); Consensus first-team All-American (1971); Consensus second-team All-American (1970); 2× First-team All-Pac-8 (1970, 1971); No. 35 retired by UCLA Bruins

Career NBA statistics
- Points: 12,803 (16.8 ppg)
- Rebounds: 6,620 (8.7 rpg)
- Assists: 2,437 (3.2 apg)
- Stats at NBA.com
- Stats at Basketball Reference
- Collegiate Basketball Hall of Fame

Sidney Wicks (born September 19, 1949) is an American former professional basketball player in the National Basketball Association (NBA). A native of California, he played college basketball for the UCLA Bruins. Wicks was selected by the Portland Trail Blazers in the 1971 NBA draft with the second overall pick. He was named the NBA Rookie of the Year and was a four-time NBA All-Star with the Trail Blazers. He also played professionally for the Boston Celtics and San Diego Clippers, finishing his career after one season in Italy.

== Early life ==
Wicks was born on September 19, 1949, in Contra Costa County, California. He attended Alexander Hamilton High School in Los Angeles. Because of non-qualifying grades in high school, Wicks attended Santa Monica College for a year before he could attend his preferred university, the University of California, Los Angeles (UCLA). Wicks later received Academic All-America honors at UCLA in 1971. He earned a degree in sociology from the school.

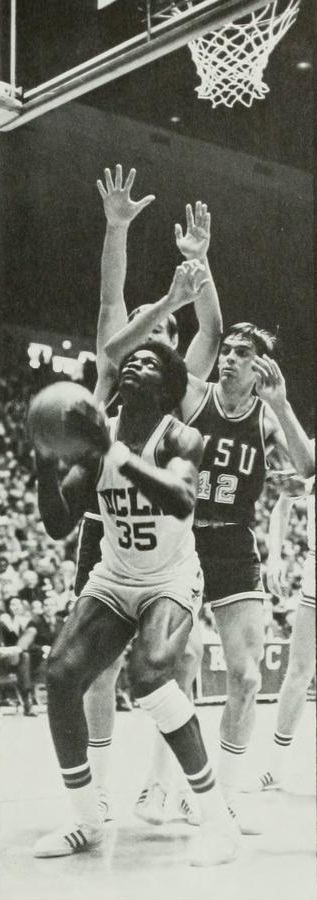
Wicks with the UCLA Bruins in 1971

A 6'8" power forward/center, Wicks was a phenom at UCLA, playing on three straight NCAA Men's Division I Basketball Championships from 1969 to 1971. He was the Bruins' star player on the latter two championship teams. Wicks was named the Most Outstanding Player of the Final Four in 1970, the Helms National Co-Player of the Year (1970), and the USBWA and Sporting News Player of the Year (1971), and was a consensus All-American in 1970 and 1971. On February 1, 1996, his jersey #35 was retired in a halftime ceremony at UCLA's home court, Pauley Pavilion. Wicks was a 1985 inductee into the UCLA Athletics Hall of Fame. In 2010, he was selected to the College Basketball Hall of Fame.

== Professional career ==
The Portland Trail Blazers selected Wicks with the second pick of the 1971 NBA draft after paying the Cleveland Cavaliers $250,000 not to select him. The Dallas Chaparrals chose him in the 1971 ABA draft. After averaging 24.5 points and 11.5 rebounds for the Trail Blazers, Wicks was named NBA Rookie of the Year. He also played in the NBA All-Star Game.

Wicks played for the Trail Blazers from 1971 to 1976, earning a total of four All-Star selections (1972–1975). He held the Blazers' franchise record for rebounds in a game with 27 until being surpassed by Enes Kanter Freedom. Wicks averaged 22.3 points and 10.3 rebounds a game in his five years with the team.

In October 1976, the rights to Wicks were sold to the Boston Celtics; Portland went on to win an NBA championship the next season. Wicks played for the Celtics from 1976 to 1978. Wicks then went to the San Diego Clippers and played there until 1981. Overall, Wicks averaged 16.8 points per game and 8.7 rebounds per game over ten seasons and 760 games in the NBA. His scoring average dropped every year after his rookie season. Following his NBA career, Wicks played one season in Italy.

== Post-NBA career ==
Following his playing career, Wicks lived for a year in Italy before returning to the United States. He served as an assistant coach at UCLA during Walt Hazzard's four years as head coach. Following coaching, he entered the real estate field, living in Atlanta, Florida, and Los Angeles.

== Personal life ==
Wicks was married from 1973 to 1979. He has one daughter, Sibahn Epps.

At 9 a.m. on May 5, 1989, in Mira Mesa, San Diego, California, Wicks was seriously injured in a car accident. A loaded cement truck failed to stop at a red light and struck the driver's side of Wicks's vehicle. Wicks had his ruptured spleen removed at Scripps Memorial Hospital in La Jolla, California. He also had facial lacerations and minor head injuries. A passenger in Wicks' car suffered a mild concussion and facial injuries. The cement truck driver was not injured.

As of 2006, Wicks lived in North Carolina and Los Angeles.

== NBA career statistics ==
Legend
GP	Games played	GS	Games started	MPG	Minutes per game
FG%	Field goal percentage	3P%	3-point field goal percentage	FT%	Free throw percentage
RPG	Rebounds per game	APG	Assists per game	SPG	Steals per game
BPG	Blocks per game	PPG	Points per game	**Bold**	Career high

=== Regular season ===
Year	Team	GP	GS	MPG	FG%	3P%	FT%	RPG	APG	SPG	BPG	PPG
1971–72	Portland	**82**	—	**39.6**	.427	—	.710	**11.5**	4.3	—	—	**24.5**
1972–73	Portland	80	—	39.4	.452	—	.723	10.9	**5.5**	—	—	23.8
1973–74	Portland	75	—	38.0	.459	—	**.762**	9.1	4.3	**1.2**	.8	22.5
1974–75	Portland	**82**	—	38.6	**.497**	—	.706	10.7	3.5	1.3	**1.0**	21.7
1975–76	Portland	79	—	38.5	.483	—	.674	9.0	3.1	1.0	.7	19.1
1976–77	Boston	**82**	—	32.2	.458	—	.668	10.0	2.1	.8	.7	15.1
1977–78	Boston	81	—	29.8	.467	—	.660	8.3	2.1	.8	.6	13.4
1978–79	San Diego	79	—	25.6	.462	—	.650	5.1	1.6	.9	.5	9.8
1979–80	San Diego	71	—	30.2	.423	.000	.546	5.8	3.0	1.1	.7	7.1
1980–81	San Diego	49	—	22.1	.437	.000	.507	4.6	2.3	.8	.8	6.7
Career		760	—	33.9	.459	.000	.685	8.7	3.2	1.0	.7	16.8
All-Star		4	1	20.3	.450	—	.722	8.3	1.0	—	—	12.3

=== Playoffs ===
Year	Team	GP	GS	MPG	FG%	3P%	FT%	RPG	APG	SPG	BPG	PPG
1977	Boston	9	—	29.0	.519	—	.732	9.2	1.8	1.4	.3	13.1
Career		9	—	29.0	.519	—	.732	9.2	1.8	1.4	.3	13.1
