= UCLA Bruins men's basketball retired numbers =

Basketball team jersey numbers no longer in use

The men's college basketball program of the University of California, Los Angeles (UCLA) was founded in 1920 and is known competitively as the UCLA Bruins. The Bruins have won 11 National Collegiate Athletic Association (NCAA) Division I national championships, the most of any school. UCLA players have been assigned jersey numbers ranging from 0 to 78 in the team's history. The school no longer issues nine retired numbers in honor of 10 former players. To qualify, a player must have been a three-time consensus All-American, a consensus national player of the year, or been inducted into the Naismith Memorial Basketball Hall of Fame. The retired numbers are displayed in the rafters of the Bruins' home arena, Pauley Pavilion. UCLA's legendary coach John Wooden generally opposed having numbers retired.

== History ==
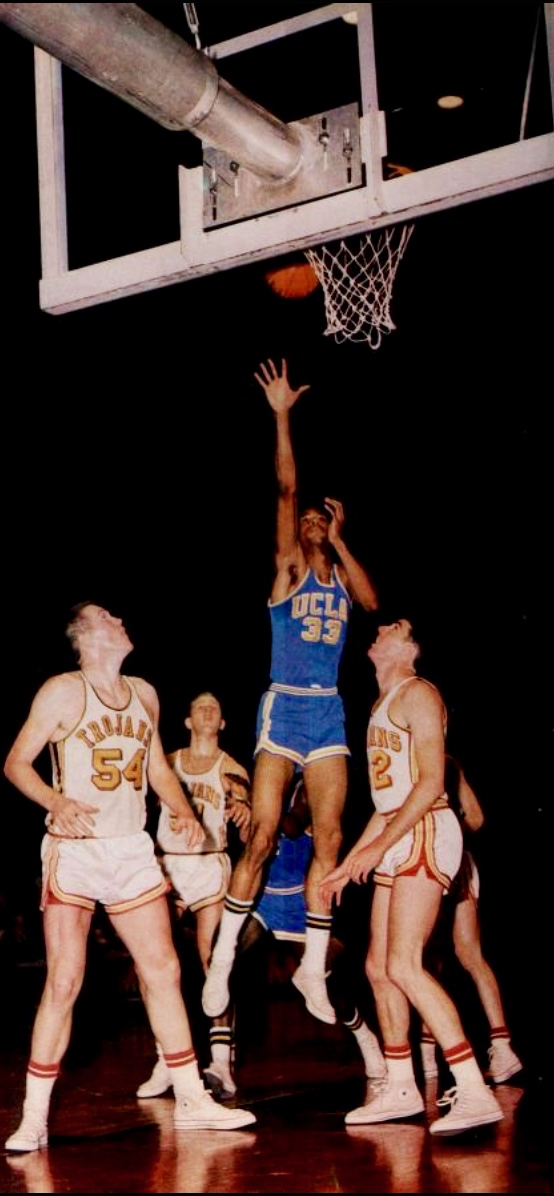
Lew Alcindor (blue), now Kareem Abdul-Jabbar, against the USC Trojans in the 1966–67 season.

Numbers retired by UCLA were originally limited to three-time consensus All-Americans. In 1990, Kareem Abdul-Jabbar, known as Lew Alcindor during his UCLA career, and Bill Walton were the first to have their numbers retired. The ceremony was held in conjunction with the 25th anniversary of Pauley Pavilion. (Note: The ceremony also retired the numbers of UCLA women's players Denise Curry (12) and Ann Meyers (15).) Wooden valued team play over individual accolades, and he opposed retiring numbers. "What about the fellows who wore that number before?" Wooden asked. "Didn't they contribute to the team?" Wooden did think highly of Abdul-Jabbar and Walton. "If such a thing can be deserved, it'd be Alcindor and Walton. But I don't think it would be anyone else," said Wooden.

UCLA in 1996 expanded the requirements for retiring numbers to include players who were consensus national players of the year. This allowed the jersey numbers of Walt Hazzard (No. 42), Sidney Wicks (35), Marques Johnson (54), and Ed O'Bannon (31) to be retired. In 2004, UCLA also allowed players inducted into the Naismith Hall of Fame to be eligible, enabling the retirement of Gail Goodrich's No. 25. Three Bruins were inducted into the Hall of Fame in 2012, and UCLA retired their numbers in 2013—Jamaal Wilkes (52), Reggie Miller (31), and Don Barksdale (11). It was the second time No. 31 was retired, O'Bannon's being the first.

Eight of the players honored were members of NCAA championship teams, and seven of the players were coached by Wooden. Although Hazzard's No. 42 was retired, he allowed Kevin Love (2007–2008) to wear it. Johnson's retired No. 54 was worn by his sons, Kris (1994–1998) and Josiah (2001–2005).

In 2014, UCLA announced that No. 42 would be retired across all the university's sports in honor of Jackie Robinson, a four-sport star at UCLA who went on to a Hall of Fame career in Major League Baseball after breaking the baseball color line. While Robinson wore several different numbers while at the school from 1939 to 1941, UCLA chose to honor the iconic No. 42 that he wore during his career with the Brooklyn Dodgers. The announcement had no impact on the men's basketball program, since the number was already retired for Hazzard, who had requested No. 42 as his college number to follow in the footsteps of Robinson, his childhood idol. Robinson also played basketball for the Bruins, but he wore No. 18.

== Retired numbers ==
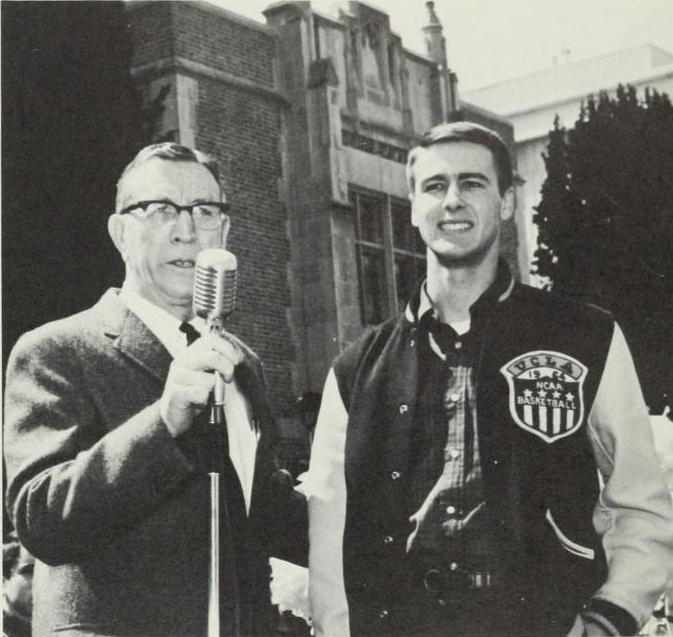
Gail Goodrich (right) with John Wooden in 1965

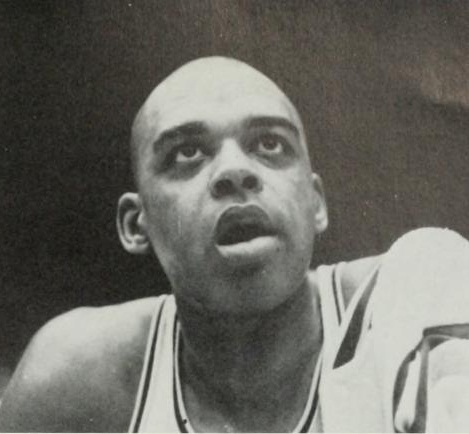
Walt Hazzard in 1964

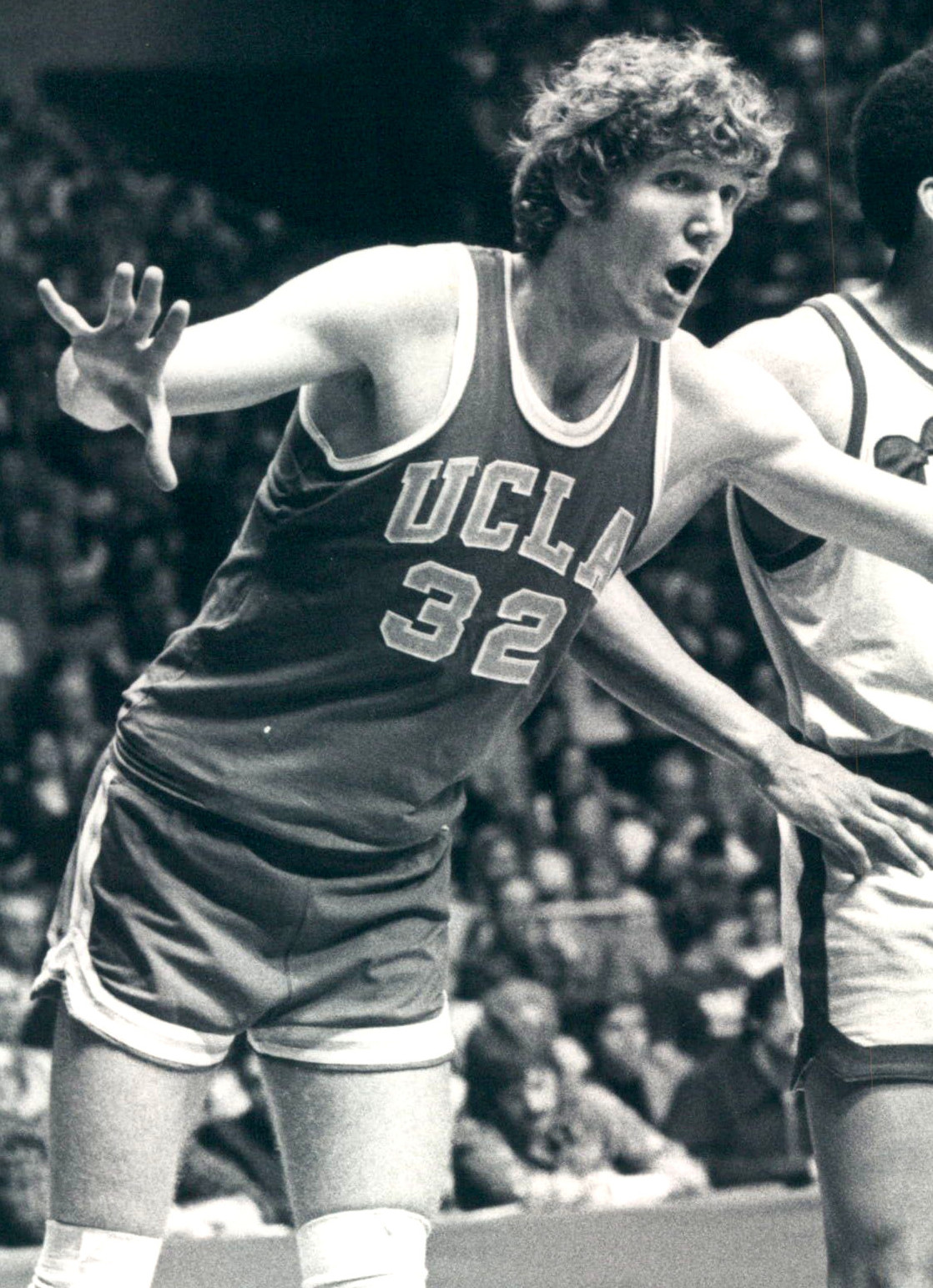
Bill Walton

Key
| No. | Retired number |
| Player | Name of player honored |
| Career | Years played with UCLA |
| NCAA | Number of times member of NCAA championship team |
| AA | Number of times named consensus All-American |
| POY | Number of years named national player of the year |
| Retired | Year number was retired |
| * | Member of Naismith Memorial Basketball Hall of Fame |

UCLA Bruins men's basketball retired numbers
| No. | Player | Career | NCAA | AA | POY | Retired | Ref |
|---|---|---|---|---|---|---|---|
| 11 | Don Barksdale | 1946–1947 | 0 | 0 | 0 | 2013 | |
| 25 | Gail Goodrich | 1962–1965 | 2 | 1 | 1 (Note: Goodrich won the since-defunct Helms Foundation Player of the Year, but he was not honored until UCLA allowed Hall of Fame inductees to have their numbers retired.) | 2004 | |
| 31 | Ed O'Bannon | 1991–1995 | 1 | 1 | 1 | 1996 | |
| 31 | Reggie Miller | 1983–1987 | 0 | 0 | 0 | 2013 | |
| 32 | Bill Walton | 1971–1974 | 2 | 3 | 3 | 1990 | |
| 33 | Kareem Abdul-Jabbar (Note: Known as Lew Alcindor during his college career) | 1966–1969 | 3 | 3 | 3 | 1990 | |
| 35 | Sidney Wicks | 1968–1971 | 3 | 2 | 2 | 1996 | |
| 42 | Walt Hazzard | 1961–1964 | 1 | 1 | 1 | 1996 | |
| 52 | Jamaal Wilkes (Note: Known as Keith Wilkes during his college career) | 1971–1974 | 2 | 2 | 0 | 2013 | |
| 54 | Marques Johnson | 1973–1977 | 1 | 1 | 1 | 1996 | |

== See also ==
- List of NCAA men's basketball retired numbers
- UCLA Bruins football retired numbers
