= Marques Johnson =

American basketball player (born 1956)

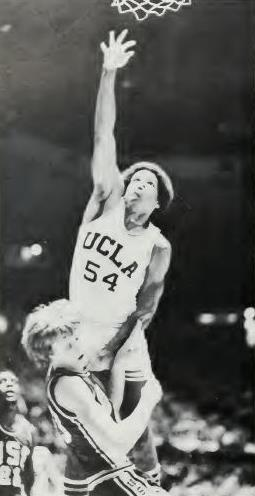
- Johnson with UCLA in 1976–77

Personal information
- Born: February 8, 1956 (age 70) Natchitoches, Louisiana, U.S.
- Listed height: 6 ft 7 in (2.01 m)
- Listed weight: 218 lb (99 kg)

Career information
- High school: Crenshaw (Los Angeles, California)
- College: UCLA (1973–1977)
- NBA draft: 1977: 1st round, 3rd overall pick
- Drafted by: Milwaukee Bucks
- Playing career: 1977–1990
- Position: Small forward
- Number: 8

Career history
- 1977–1984: Milwaukee Bucks
- 1984–1987: Los Angeles Clippers
- 1989: Golden State Warriors
- 1989–1990: Fantoni Udine

Career highlights
- 5× NBA All-Star (1979–1981, 1983, 1986); All-NBA First Team (1979); 2× All-NBA Second Team (1980, 1981); NBA Comeback Player of the Year (1986); NBA All-Rookie First Team (1978); No. 8 retired by Milwaukee Bucks; NCAA champion (1975); National college player of the year (1977); Consensus first-team All-American (1977); Second-team All-American – NABC (1976); Pac-8 Player of the Year (1977); 2× First-team All-Pac-8 (1976, 1977); No. 54 retired by UCLA Bruins; California Mr. Basketball (1973)

Career NBA statistics
- Points: 13,892 (20.1 ppg)
- Rebounds: 4,817 (7.0 rpg)
- Assists: 2,502 (3.6 apg)
- Stats at NBA.com
- Stats at Basketball Reference
- Collegiate Basketball Hall of Fame

Marques Kevin Johnson (born February 8, 1956) is an American former professional basketball player and character actor who is a basketball analyst for the Milwaukee Bucks on FanDuel Sports Network Wisconsin. He played as a small forward in the National Basketball Association (NBA) from 1977 to 1989, where he was a five-time All-Star. He played the majority of his career with the Bucks.

Johnson was a Los Angeles City Section player of the year in high school before playing college basketball for the UCLA Bruins, winning a national championship in 1975. In his senior year, he won multiple national player of the year awards. Johnson was the third overall pick in the 1977 NBA draft by the Milwaukee Bucks. He played seven seasons with Milwaukee before finishing his NBA career with the Los Angeles Clippers and the Golden State Warriors.

== Early life ==
Johnson was born on February 8, 1956, in Natchitoches, Louisiana. The family moved to California when he was five to avoid racism and segregation, which Johnson himself had experienced. He was raised in South Los Angeles. Inspired by Jackie Robinson, Johnson's parents believed that being able to attend the University of California, Los Angeles, would allow their children to achieve. They were both schoolteachers. His mother earned a Master's degree in library science from the University of Southern California. His father was also an assistant basketball coach at Crenshaw High School.

Johnson attended elementary school with future National Football League Hall of Fame receiver James Lofton. At 11 years old, the family moved to Windsor Hills, where some of the kids he played sports with were the children of celebrities. He played high school basketball at Crenshaw High School in Crenshaw, Los Angeles, under head coach Willie West (who won double digit city and state championships), winning the Los Angeles City Section 4-A Division Player of the Year in 1973. In 2015, he was selected to the California Interscholastic Federation (CIF) 100th Anniversary Winter All-Century Team.

== College career ==
In 1973, Johnson was offered a scholarship to play basketball at UCLA. He was recruited directly by Naismith Memorial Basketball Hall of Fame Coach John Wooden, who called Johnson on the telephone 10 minutes after the 1973 NCAA championship game had ended in a dominant win for UCLA, and asked if Johnson wanted to be part of the team next year; to which Johnson said yes.

Johnson attended UCLA, playing under Wooden for two seasons (1973-1975) and College Basketball Hall of Fame Coach Gene Bartow for two seasons (1975-1977). He was selected Division I second-team All American by the National Association of Basketball Coaches in his junior year (1975–76), and became a consensus first-team All-American player his senior year (1976–77).

In his freshman year though, he was joining a team that had been 60–0 the previous two years, and had future Naismith Memorial Basketball Hall of Fame players Bill Walton and Jamaal "Silk" Wilkes. During his first week of practice, Wilkes blocked all of his shots, which brought him to tears when he told his parents about his difficulties. His father let him know Wilkes was the best forward in the country, and Johnson would be fine.

In his sophomore season in 1974–75, playing forward, Johnson helped to lead the Bruins to Coach John Wooden's 10th and final NCAA Division I men's basketball championship. He was third on the team in both scoring and rebounding. Wooden retired from coaching after the season, and Gene Bartow became the head coach. Johnson continued to excel, earning the first of his two first-team All-Pac-8 selections as a junior in 1976. As a junior, he was second on the team in scoring average (17.3 points per game) and first in rebounding (9.4 per game). He made the NCAA All-Tournament Team in 1976, although UCLA lost in the final four to the eventual champion Indiana Hoosiers.

Johnson averaged 21.1 points and 11.1 rebounds per game in his senior season (1976-1977), leading the team in both categories. He won the inaugural John R. Wooden Award in addition to the Naismith College Player of the Year and USBWA College Player of the Year as the nation's top collegiate basketball player.

Johnson also majored in Theater Arts at UCLA, having enjoyed starring in musical theater in high school, and acting at UCLA (later working as an actor professionally). He also took a newly offered sportscasting class while a student at UCLA, and hosted a non-sports campus television show.

In 1988, he was inducted into the UCLA Athletic Hall of Fame. The Bruins retired his No. 54 jersey in 1996. In 2008, he was inducted into the Pac-12 Hall of Honor. In 2013, he was inducted into the National Collegiate Basketball Hall of Fame.

== Professional career ==
=== Milwaukee Bucks (1977–1984) ===
Johnson was selected third overall in the 1977 NBA draft by the Milwaukee Bucks, coached by Don Nelson. Johnson averaged 19.5 points per game and 10.6 rebounds per game in his first professional season. He was named to the 1978 NBA All-Rookie Team, and placed second in NBA Rookie of the Year voting behind Walter Davis.

In his second season in 1978–79, Johnson was the NBA's third leading scorer (25.6 PPG), behind George Gervin (29.6) and Lloyd Free (28.8). He was named a starter, and played in the 1979 NBA All-Star Game and was named to the All-NBA First Team. That season, in what was perhaps one of the best games of his career, on December 12, 1978, Johnson scored 40 points (on a remarkable 74% shooting percentage) and grabbed 12 rebounds in a 120–114 win against the Phoenix Suns. However, despite having the 6th highest offensive efficiency rating and 13th highest defensive rating of any team, the Bucks would miss the playoffs with a 38–44 record. It would be the last time the Bucks missed the playoffs during Johnson's tenure.

The following season, on February 27, 1980, Johnson recorded a triple double with 25 points, 11 rebounds, and 11 assists in a 119–110 victory against the Phoenix Suns. During that year's playoffs, Johnson averaged 19.9 points and 6.9 rebounds in 43.3 minutes a game, in a tightly contested 7-game series loss to the Seattle SuperSonics (it was the last season Milwaukee was in the Western Conference, moving to the Eastern Conference Central Division in 1980-81).

On November 2, 1980, Johnson scored 40 points, along with 7 rebounds and 7 assists, to lead the Bucks to a 135–121 victory against the Indiana Pacers. The feat was especially impressive as key teammates Junior Bridgeman and Sidney Moncrief were limited with injuries, and only played 19 and 20 minutes respectively.

On May 2, 1983, in Game 4 of the Eastern Conference Semifinals, Johnson scored 33 points and grabbed 9 rebounds to lead the Bucks to a 4–0 sweep of Larry Bird and the Boston Celtics. Despite this, the Bucks would fall to the eventual champion Philadelphia 76ers, led by NBA MVP Moses Malone, during the next round in 5 games, in what were contested matchups. It was the only series Philadelphia did not win in 4 games that postseason.

Johnson claims to have coined the term point forward, a position he played out of necessity in 1984. During the 1984 playoffs, Milwaukee became short on point guards due to injuries. Nelson instructed Johnson to set up the offense from his forward position. Johnson responded, "OK, so instead of a point guard, I'm a point forward".

Johnson helped lead Milwaukee to several division titles (1980, 1981, 1982, 1983, 1984). Johnson and the Bucks reached as far as the Eastern Conference Finals twice, in 1983 and again in 1984. The team had trouble with the Boston Celtics and Philadelphia 76ers in the playoffs once they moved to the Eastern Conference. While with the Bucks, he was first-team All NBA in 1978-79, and second-team All NBA in 1979-80 and 1980–81; and was an All-Star four times, starting in 1979 and 1980. During his seven year tenure with the Bucks, Johnson had 10,980 points, 3,923 rebounds, 1,934 assists, 697 steals, and 439 blocks. As of March 2019, these were all in the top 10 for the franchise’s career leaders. He held out twice during his Bucks' career for a better contract than what the team offered.

While on the Bucks, both Johnson and teammate Mickey Johnson were the first two players in NBA history to have their full first and last names displayed on their jerseys, as they both shared the same first initial and last name.

The Bucks retired his number 8 in 2019. When asked about his favorite experience on the Bucks upon the announcement of his jersey being retired in 2019, Johnson said “It was a compilation of everything. It was getting there in 1977, 21 years old out of L.A., stars in my eyes, and thoughts of being a great NBA player was my goal. And winning a championship in Milwaukee." Johnson continued, "But what happened was, I come to Milwaukee, and we’ve got this nucleus of just great young talent from all sorts of solid programs: myself and Dave Meyers from UCLA; and Junior Bridgeman from Louisville; Quinn Buckner, who we lost to twice in ’76 on that great Indiana team with Kent Benson; Brian Winters from South Carolina."

=== Los Angeles Clippers (1984–1987) ===
In the 1984 off-season, Nelson – who was also Bucks general manager – traded Johnson, forward-guard Junior Bridgeman, forward Harvey Catchings and cash to the Los Angeles Clippers in exchange for forward Terry Cummings, and guards Craig Hodges and Ricky Pierce. This was a homecoming for Johnson, as he grew up and attended high school just a few miles from the Clippers' home at Los Angeles Memorial Sports Arena. In his first season with the Clippers in 1984–85, he had career lows in scoring and shooting. They moved him to guard in 1985–86, and he bounced back with an All-Star season and was named the NBA Comeback Player of the Year, ironically winning the award over Walter Davis who earlier had bested him for Rookie of the Year.

The Clippers struggled to win, never winning more than 32 games in a season during Johnson's three years, and going 12–70 his final year (the fourth worst record in NBA history). Johnson later said that playing for those losing Clippers teams "kind of wore you down and made you feel like you were kind of the JV team in Los Angeles." Being named the team captain by head coach Don Chaney, a fellow Louisianan, was one of the few things that kept him from demanding a trade, and he stood by Chaney when Chaney's job was threatened. On November 20, 1986, Johnson suffered a ruptured disk in his neck after colliding with teammate Benoit Benjamin during a game in Dallas. The following year, he was in a contract dispute with the Clippers who had stopped paying his salary, claiming he was permanently disabled.

=== Golden State Warriors (1989) ===
After a couple of unsuccessful comebacks, Johnson joined the Golden State Warriors in October 1989. He appeared in 10 games with the Warriors before being waived on December 1 the same year.

=== Fantoni Udine (1989–1990) ===
After being waived by the Warriors, Johnson signed with Fantoni Udine in the Italy where he went on to average 23.6 points per game.

== Personal life ==
Johnson has five sons, Kris, Josiah, Joshua, Moriah and Cyrus, and two daughters, Jasmine and Shiloh. Johnson's child, Marques Kevin Johnson Jr., was 15-months-old when he fell into the family swimming pool on May 15, 1987, and drowned.

Kris, like his father, played basketball at Crenshaw High and UCLA, where he was player of the year in high school and an NCAA champion in 1995. Johnson and Kris are the first father–son combo to be honored as Los Angeles City Section 4-A Player of the Year. (Note: Dwayne Polee (1981) and Dwayne Jr. (2010) also won the award.) They are also one of four father-son duos to each win an NCAA basketball championship and the only ones to accomplish it at the same school. (Note: The others are Scott and Sean May, Henry and Mike Bibby, and Derek and Nolan Smith.) In 2024, Johnson and Kris started a podcast for the Milwaukee Bucks called "Hear District".

Josiah also played basketball at UCLA, and later helped create the Comedy Central show, The Legends of Chamberlain Heights. He also became notable for viral Twitter comments on NBA plays. He is the host of Gil's Arena with Gilbert Arenas on the Underdog Fantasy Sports network and No Chill with Gilbert Arenas.

Josh played college basketball at Western Oregon State University, and is an actor.

Moriah played basketball at Tuskegee University, where he also got a Master's degree in occupational therapy, and was an actor on the BET's Baldwin Hills.

Cyrus played basketball at Sam Houston State University, and then California State University, Los Angeles.

Johnson also has two daughters. Jasmine is an accomplished tennis player. Shiloh excels at golf and swimming, and at 15 years old, and 6 ft tall, has become a high school basketball player (as of 2024).

During his early playing career, Johnson suffered with substance abuse issues. While on the Bucks, in 1982, Johnson was treated for cocaine addiction at a drug rehabilitation facility, and missed 18 games during his rehabilitation treatment. After the death of his son, he again went through therapy for substance abuse, grief and other issues, which he has spoken about publicly. In 2024, he was actively working to create a program in Milwaukee to help men struggling with substance abuse disorder, something he works to overcome in himself every day.

Looking back on his transition from comparatively warm-weather southern California to Wisconsin upon being drafted, Johnson said, “My first year — and I may get this conflated — but the first year was more snow than they’d had in 25 years. It was just snow, snow, snow until May, and then my second year was the coldest that it had been in 30 years… And everybody kept telling me that ‘This is really extreme. It’s bad, but it’s not really this bad.’ And you couldn't have told me different.”

== Media career ==
Following up on his UCLA experiences in the media, during his time as a player in Milwaukee he did some work for the local NBC television affiliate, including a piece on playing the Celtics and 76ers where he interviewed Red Auerbach and Julius Erving.

As his playing career ended, Johnson got into the entertainment business, as he acted in small roles in many films, including White Men Can't Jump, Love and Action in Chicago, Blue Chips, and Forget Paris. Johnson is still actively enhancing his creative roots, writing screenplays and short stories. His role in the aforementioned White Men Can't Jump as Raymond was praised, and Johnson claims fans still regularly quote the movie to him if they recognize him in public. Director Ron Shelton called Johnson fabulous in his famous scene.

Johnson was the early morning show co-host on the Clippers' flagship radio station, KFWB-AM in Los Angeles.

Johnson served as a color analyst for the Seattle SuperSonics in the late 1990s. He was nationally on Fox Sports and Fox Sports 1 and NBA League Pass as a basketball analyst.

Since 2015, Johnson has worked as both a full-time and part-time analyst for Milwaukee Bucks telecasts on Fox Sports Wisconsin. He worked with both Jim Paschke and Gus Johnson. In 2018, Johnson won an Emmy as top analyst in the Midwest-Region for his work broadcaster Bucks' games.

== Awards and honors ==
- The Milwaukee Bucks retired Johnson's No. 8 jersey on March 24, 2019.
- The Bruins retired his No. 54 jersey in 1996.
- In 2013, Johnson was inducted into the College Basketball Hall of Fame.
- In 2019, Johnson was inducted into the California Sports Hall of Fame.
- In 2019, Johnson was inducted into the Wisconsin Athletic Hall of Fame.
- 5× NBA All-Star (1979–1981, 1983, 1986)
- All-NBA First Team (1979)
- 2× All-NBA Second Team (1980–1981)
- NBA All-Rookie First Team (1978)
- NBA Comeback Player of the Year: (1986)
- NCAA champion (1975)
- Naismith College Player of the Year (1977)
- John R. Wooden Award (1977)
- USBWA Player of the Year (1977)
- Adolph Rupp Trophy (1977)
- NABC Player of the Year (1977)
- AP College Player of the Year (1977)
- UPI College Basketball of the Year (1977)
- Helms Foundation Player of the Year (1977)
- Sporting News Player of the Year (1977)
- Pac-10 Player of the Year (1977)
- Consensus first team All-American (1977)
- Pac-10 Hall of Honor

== NBA career statistics ==
Legend
GP	Games played	GS	Games started	MPG	Minutes per game
FG%	Field goal percentage	3P%	3-point field goal percentage	FT%	Free throw percentage
RPG	Rebounds per game	APG	Assists per game	SPG	Steals per game
BPG	Blocks per game	PPG	Points per game	**Bold**	Career high

=== Regular season ===
Year	Team	GP	GS	MPG	FG%	3P%	FT%	RPG	APG	SPG	BPG	PPG
1977–78	Milwaukee	**80**	—	34.6	.522	—	.736	**10.6**	2.4	1.2	**1.3**	19.5
1978–79	Milwaukee	77	—	36.1	.550	—	.760	7.6	3.0	1.5	1.2	**25.6**
1979–80	Milwaukee	77	—	34.9	.544	.222	.791	7.4	3.5	1.3	.9	21.7
1980–81	Milwaukee	76	—	33.4	**.552**	.000	.706	6.8	**4.6**	1.5	.5	20.3
1981–82	Milwaukee	60	52	31.7	.532	.000	.700	6.1	3.6	1.0	.6	16.5
1982–83	Milwaukee	**80**	**80**	35.7	.509	.200	.735	7.0	4.5	1.3	.7	21.4
1983–84	Milwaukee	74	74	**36.7**	.502	.154	.709	6.5	4.3	**1.6**	.6	20.7
1984–85	L.A. Clippers	72	68	34.0	.452	.231	.731	5.9	3.4	1.0	.4	16.4
1985–86	L.A. Clippers	75	75	34.7	.510	.067	.760	5.5	3.8	1.4	.7	20.3
1986–87	L.A. Clippers	10	10	30.2	.439	.000	.714	3.3	2.8	1.2	.5	16.6
1989–90	Golden State	10	0	9.9	.375	**.667**	**.824**	1.7	.9	.0	.1	4.0
Career		691	359	34.3	.518	.152	.739	7.0	3.6	1.3	.8	20.1
All-Star		5	2	21.2	.314	—	.750	3.8	1.8	0.2	0.4	6.8

=== Playoffs ===
Year	Team	GP	GS	MPG	FG%	3P%	FT%	RPG	APG	SPG	BPG	PPG
1978	Milwaukee	9	—	35.7	.549	—	**.750**	**12.4**	3.4	1.1	**1.9**	24.0
1980	Milwaukee	7	—	**43.3**	.422	**.333**	**.750**	6.9	2.9	.7	.9	19.9
1981	Milwaukee	7	—	38.0	**.556**	.000	.719	9.4	**4.9**	**1.4**	1.0	**24.7**
1982	Milwaukee	6	—	39.2	.440	.250	.571	7.3	3.3	1.0	.3	18.8
1983	Milwaukee	9	—	42.4	.486	.000	.651	8.0	4.2	.9	.8	22.0
1984	Milwaukee	**16**	—	37.8	.473	.250	.722	5.3	3.4	1.1	.4	20.3
Career		54	—	39.1	.489	.231	.701	7.9	3.7	1.0	.8	21.5
