= 1979 NBA playoffs =

American basketball tournament

Tournament details
- Dates: April 10–June 1, 1979
- Season: 1978–79
- Teams: 12

Final positions
- Champions: Seattle SuperSonics (1st title)
- Runners-up: Washington Bullets
- Semifinalists: Phoenix Suns; San Antonio Spurs

The 1979 NBA playoffs was the postseason tournament of the National Basketball Association's 1978–79 season. The tournament concluded with the Western Conference champion Seattle SuperSonics defeating the Eastern Conference champion Washington Bullets 4 games to 1 in the NBA Finals. The Sonics earned their only NBA title. Dennis Johnson was named NBA Finals MVP.

The Finals was a rematch of 1978, in which Washington defeated Seattle 4–3. As of 2026, this remains the last time the Bullets (now the Wizards) have advanced as far as the Conference Finals. They have the longest conference finals drought of any team in the four major professional sports in North America.

The Spurs made their first visit to the Conference Finals in these playoffs.

This was the first time that three of the former ABA teams made the playoffs, as it was the NBA playoff debut of the New Jersey Nets.

This was the first time both conference finals went to a deciding Game 7 since 1963 and the last until 2018.

== Bracket ==
First Round
E4	Houston	0
E5	Atlanta	2
E3	Philadelphia	2
E6	New Jersey	0
W4	Denver	1
W5	Los Angeles	2
W3	Phoenix	2
W6	Portland	1

Conference Semifinals
E1	Washington*	4
E5	Atlanta	3
Eastern Conference
E3	Philadelphia	3
E2	San Antonio*	4
W1	Seattle*	4
W5	Los Angeles	1
Western Conference
W3	Phoenix	4
W2	Kansas City*	1

Conference Finals
E1	Washington*	4
E2	San Antonio*	3
W1	Seattle*	4
W3	Phoenix	3

NBA Finals
E1	Washington*	1
W1	Seattle*	4

- * Division winner
- Bold Series winner
- Italic Team with home-court advantage

== First round ==
=== Eastern Conference first round ===
==== (3) Philadelphia 76ers vs. (6) New Jersey Nets ====
April 11

Boxscore

New Jersey Nets 114, Philadelphia 76ers 122
Scoring by quarter: 22–33, 23–22, 28–30, 41–37
Pts: John Williamson 38; Rebs: George Johnson 12; Asts: Eddie Jordan 9	Pts: Julius Erving 28; Rebs: Julius Erving 14; Asts: Henry Bibby 7
Philadelphia leads series, 1–0

Spectrum, Philadelphia, Pennsylvania
Attendance: 8,846
Referees: Joe Gushue, Earl Strom, Jess Kersey

April 13

Boxscore

Philadelphia 76ers 111, New Jersey Nets 101
Scoring by quarter: 22–25, 29–20, 27–23, 33–33
Pts: Caldwell Jones 24; Rebs: Caldwell Jones 21; Asts: three players 5 each	Pts: Bernard King 27; Rebs: van Breda Kolff, Johnson 13 each Asts: Eddie Jordan 8
Philadelphia wins series, 2–0

Rutgers Athletic Center, Piscataway, New Jersey
Attendance: 9,126
Referees: John Vanak, Ed Rush, Paul Mihalak

Game two was the only NBA playoff game at the Rutgers Athletic Center.

This was the first playoff meeting between these two teams.

==== (4) Houston Rockets vs. (5) Atlanta Hawks ====
April 11

Boxscore

Atlanta Hawks 109, Houston Rockets 106
Scoring by quarter: 27–31, 23–26, 39–28, 20–21
Pts: Dan Roundfield 23; Rebs: Dan Roundfield 18; Asts: Hawes, Criss 4 each	Pts: Moses Malone 28; Rebs: Moses Malone 17; Asts: Slick Watts 7
Atlanta leads series, 1–0

The Summit, Houston, Texas
Attendance: 14,405

April 13

Boxscore

Houston Rockets 91, Atlanta Hawks 100
Scoring by quarter: 27–31, 31–21, 20–26, 13–22
Pts: Moses Malone 21; Rebs: Moses Malone 24; Asts: Calvin Murphy 4	Pts: Drew, Johnson 25 each Rebs: John Drew 13; Asts: Eddie Johnson 8
Atlanta wins series, 2–0

Omni Coliseum, Atlanta, Georgia
Attendance: 15,798

This was the second playoff meeting between these two teams, with the Hawks winning the only previous meeting.

Previous playoff series
Atlanta/ St. Louis leads 1–0 in all-time playoff series

1969

St. Louis Hawks 4, San Diego Rockets 2

1969 Western Division Semifinals

=== Western Conference first round ===
==== (3) Phoenix Suns vs. (6) Portland Trail Blazers ====
April 10

Boxscore

Portland Trail Blazers 103, Phoenix Suns 107
Scoring by quarter: 20–23, 26–25, 27–31, 30–28
Pts: Ron Brewer 26; Rebs: Thompson, Lucas 10 each Asts: Lucas, Brewer 5 each	Pts: Paul Westphal 28; Rebs: Adams, Davis 5 each Asts: Alvan Adams 9
Phoenix leads series, 1–0

Arizona Veterans Memorial Coliseum, Phoenix, Arizona
Attendance: 12,660

April 13

Boxscore

Phoenix Suns 92, Portland Trail Blazers 96
Scoring by quarter: 24–25, 26–27, 26–21, 16–23
Pts: Walter Davis 31; Rebs: Gar Heard 9 Asts: Paul Westphal 6	Pts: Ron Brewer 21; Rebs: Mychal Thompson 17; Asts: Maurice Lucas 4
Series tied, 1–1

Memorial Coliseum, Portland, Oregon
Attendance: 12,666
Referees: Jack Madden, Lee Jones, Wally Rooney

April 15

Boxscore

Portland Trail Blazers 91, Phoenix Suns 101
Scoring by quarter: 22–24, 28–23, 26–21, 15–33
Pts: three players 16 each Rebs: Maurice Lucas 16; Asts: Maurice Lucas 9	Pts: Paul Westphal 26; Rebs: Gar Heard 12; Asts: Walter Davis 8
Phoenix wins series, 2–1

Arizona Veterans Memorial Coliseum, Phoenix, Arizona
Attendance: 12,660

This was the first playoff meeting between these two teams.

==== (4) Denver Nuggets vs. (5) Los Angeles Lakers ====
April 10

Boxscore

Los Angeles Lakers 105, Denver Nuggets 110
Scoring by quarter: 26–29, 26–31, 28–31, 25–19
Pts: Kareem Abdul-Jabbar 23; Rebs: Kareem Abdul-Jabbar 12; Asts: Norm Nixon 11	Pts: Dan Issel 30; Rebs: Dan Issel 10; Asts: Bob Wilkerson 7
Denver leads series, 1–0

McNichols Sports Arena, Denver, Colorado
Attendance: 16,011

April 13

Boxscore

Denver Nuggets 109, Los Angeles Lakers 121
Scoring by quarter: 22–29, 25–20, 28–32, 34–40
Pts: David Thompson 29; Rebs: Tom Boswell 12; Asts: Tom Boswell 7	Pts: Kareem Abdul-Jabbar 32; Rebs: Jamaal Wilkes 13; Asts: Norm Nixon 16
Series tied, 1–1

The Forum, Inglewood, California
Attendance: 14,182

April 15

Boxscore

Los Angeles Lakers 112, Denver Nuggets 111
Scoring by quarter: 31–28, 27–26, 27–32, 27–25
Pts: Kareem Abdul-Jabbar 29; Rebs: Kareem Abdul-Jabbar 16; Asts: Norm Nixon 12	Pts: David Thompson 28; Rebs: Dan Issel 10; Asts: David Thompson 7
Los Angeles wins series, 2–1

McNichols Sports Arena, Denver, Colorado
Attendance: 16,181

This was the first playoff meeting between these two teams.

== Conference semifinals ==
=== Eastern Conference semifinals ===
==== (1) Washington Bullets vs. (5) Atlanta Hawks ====
April 15

Boxscore

Atlanta Hawks 89, Washington Bullets 103
Scoring by quarter: 24–30, 22–16, 30–25, 13–32
Pts: Dan Roundfield 24; Rebs: Dan Roundfield 10; Asts: Armond Hill 7	Pts: Elvin Hayes 31; Rebs: Elvin Hayes 15; Asts: Larry Wright 6
Washington leads series, 1–0

Capital Centre, Landover, Maryland
Attendance: 15,721

April 17

Boxscore

Atlanta Hawks 107, Washington Bullets 99
Scoring by quarter: 24–24, 27–26, 26–28, 30–21
Pts: Roundfield, Johnson 17 each Rebs: Tree Rollins 8 Asts: Armond Hill 6	Pts: Bob Dandridge 36; Rebs: Wes Unseld 10; Asts: Tom Henderson 8
Series tied, 1–1

Capital Centre, Landover, Maryland
Attendance: 19,035

April 20

Boxscore

Washington Bullets 89, Atlanta Hawks 77
Scoring by quarter: 16–17, 26–22, 19–22, 28–16
Pts: Elvin Hayes 19; Rebs: Wes Unseld 16; Asts: Wes Unseld 8	Pts: John Drew 13; Rebs: Roundfield, Rollins 14 each Asts: Armond Hill 5
Washington leads series, 2–1

Omni Coliseum, Atlanta, Georgia
Attendance: 15,798

April 22

Boxscore

Washington Bullets 120, Atlanta Hawks 118 (OT)
Scoring by quarter: 29–30, 22–28, 27–23, 31–28, Overtime: 11–9
Pts: Elvin Hayes 29; Rebs: Elvin Hayes 17; Asts: Bob Dandridge 5	Pts: Dan Roundfield 22; Rebs: Dan Roundfield 18; Asts: Dan Roundfield 7
Washington leads series, 3–1

Omni Coliseum, Atlanta, Georgia
Attendance: 15,798
Referees: John Vanak, Joe Gushue, Bob Rakel

April 24

Boxscore

Atlanta Hawks 107, Washington Bullets 103
Scoring by quarter: 27–34, 29–21, 25–25, 26–23
Pts: Terry Furlow 21; Rebs: Dan Roundfield 14; Asts: Armond Hill 5	Pts: Elvin Hayes 26; Rebs: Elvin Hayes 14; Asts: Tom Henderson 11
Washington leads series, 3–2

Capital Centre, Landover, Maryland
Attendance: 19,035

April 26

Boxscore

Washington Bullets 86, Atlanta Hawks 104
Scoring by quarter: 23–29, 19–19, 24–30, 20–26
Pts: Elvin Hayes 24; Rebs: Wes Unseld 12; Asts: Wes Unseld 6	Pts: Drew, Johnson 22 each Rebs: Steve Hawes 14; Asts: Armond Hill 9
Series tied, 3–3

Omni Coliseum, Atlanta, Georgia
Attendance: 15,978

April 29

Boxscore

Atlanta Hawks 94, Washington Bullets 100
Scoring by quarter: 26–26, 24–26, 19–23, 25–25
Pts: John Drew 24; Rebs: John Drew 8 Asts: Eddie Johnson 6	Pts: Elvin Hayes 39; Rebs: Elvin Hayes 15; Asts: Bob Dandridge 8
Washington wins series, 4–3

Capital Centre, Landover, Maryland
Attendance: 19,035
Referees: Darell Garretson, Joe Gushue, Hugh Evans

This was the fourth playoff meeting between these two teams, with the Wizards/Bullets winning two of the first three meetings.

Previous playoff series
Washington/Baltimore leads 2–1 in all-time playoff series

1965

St. Louis Hawks 1, Baltimore Bullets 3

1965 Western Division Semifinals

1966

Baltimore Bullets 0, St. Louis Hawks 3

1966 Western Division Semifinals

1978

Washington Bullets 2, Atlanta Hawks 0

1978 Eastern Conference First Round

==== (2) San Antonio Spurs vs. (3) Philadelphia 76ers ====
April 15

Boxscore

Philadelphia 76ers 106, San Antonio Spurs 119
Scoring by quarter: 22–31, 23–32, 25–25, 36–31
Pts: Darryl Dawkins 25; Rebs: Caldwell Jones 15; Asts: Julius Erving 7	Pts: Larry Kenon 30; Rebs: Billy Paultz 9 Asts: Silas, Bristow 7 each
San Antonio leads series, 1–0

HemisFair Arena, San Antonio, Texas
Attendance: 10,253

April 17

Boxscore

Philadelphia 76ers 120, San Antonio Spurs 121
Scoring by quarter: 33–28, 23–35, 34–28, 30–30
Pts: Julius Erving 25; Rebs: Caldwell Jones 11; Asts: Henry Bibby 10	Pts: George Gervin 29; Rebs: Larry Kenon 7 Asts: Silas, Gale 8 each
San Antonio leads series, 2–0

HemisFair Arena, San Antonio, Texas
Attendance: 16,709

April 20

Boxscore

San Antonio Spurs 115, Philadelphia 76ers 123
Scoring by quarter: 32–40, 25–23, 31–24, 27–36
Pts: James Silas 32; Rebs: Larry Kenon 15; Asts: Kenon, Gervin 5 each	Pts: Julius Erving 39; Rebs: Caldwell Jones 12; Asts: Maurice Cheeks 9
San Antonio leads series, 2–1

Spectrum, Philadelphia, Pennsylvania
Attendance: 14,039

April 22

Boxscore

San Antonio Spurs 115, Philadelphia 76ers 112
Scoring by quarter: 32–22, 20–30, 30–28, 33–32
Pts: George Gervin 32; Rebs: Larry Kenon 9 Asts: Larry Kenon 6	Pts: Maurice Cheeks 33; Rebs: Steve Mix 9 Asts: Maurice Cheeks 9
San Antonio leads series, 3–1

Spectrum, Philadelphia, Pennsylvania
Attendance: 11,163
Referees: Ed Middleton, Darell Garretson, Hugh Evans

April 26

Boxscore

Philadelphia 76ers 120, San Antonio Spurs 97
Scoring by quarter: 29–17, 21–21, 35–26, 35–33
Pts: Julius Erving 32; Rebs: Caldwell Jones 14; Asts: Maurice Cheeks 12	Pts: James Silas 19; Rebs: Larry Kenon 9 Asts: Silas, Gale 5 each
San Antonio leads series, 3–2

HemisFair Arena, San Antonio, Texas
Attendance: 16,055

April 29

Boxscore

San Antonio Spurs 90, Philadelphia 76ers 92
Scoring by quarter: 27–25, 26–23, 19–13, 18–31
Pts: James Silas 27; Rebs: Larry Kenon 15; Asts: Mike Gale 6	Pts: Caldwell Jones 20; Rebs: Caldwell Jones 17; Asts: Maurice Cheeks 6
Series tied, 3–3

Spectrum, Philadelphia, Pennsylvania
Attendance: 18,276
Referees: John Vanak, Jake O'Donnell, Paul Mihalak

- Maurice Cheeks hits game winning shot with 10 seconds remaining.

May 2

Boxscore

Philadelphia 76ers 108, San Antonio Spurs 111
Scoring by quarter: 20–29, 27–27, 34–22, 27–33
Pts: Julius Erving 34; Rebs: Caldwell Jones 14; Asts: Maurice Cheeks 13	Pts: George Gervin 33; Rebs: George Gervin 12; Asts: Mark Olberding 7
San Antonio wins series, 4–3

HemisFair Arena, San Antonio, Texas
Attendance: 16,055

This was the first meeting between these two teams.

=== Western Conference semifinals ===
==== (1) Seattle SuperSonics vs. (5) Los Angeles Lakers ====
April 17

Boxscore

Los Angeles Lakers 101, Seattle SuperSonics 112
Scoring by quarter: 29–22, 25–27, 22–32, 25–31
Pts: Kareem Abdul-Jabbar 25; Rebs: Kareem Abdul-Jabbar 11; Asts: Norm Nixon 7	Pts: Gus Williams 27; Rebs: Lonnie Shelton 12; Asts: John Johnson 9
Seattle leads series, 1–0

Kingdome, Seattle, Washington
Attendance: 26,377
Referees: Darell Garretson, Wally Rooney, Ed Rush

April 18

Boxscore

Los Angeles Lakers 103, Seattle SuperSonics 108 (OT)
Scoring by quarter: 21–27, 32–21, 15–28, 27–19, Overtime: 8–13
Pts: Kareem Abdul-Jabbar 31; Rebs: Kareem Abdul-Jabbar 15; Asts: Norm Nixon 10	Pts: Gus Williams 38; Rebs: Jack Sikma 10; Asts: Jack Sikma 8
Seattle leads series, 2–0

Kingdome, Seattle, Washington
Attendance: 26,862
Referees: John Vanak, Jim Capers, Dick Bavetta

April 20

Boxscore

Seattle SuperSonics 112, Los Angeles Lakers 118 (OT)
Scoring by quarter: 29–26, 28–32, 28–27, 22–22, Overtime: 5–11
Pts: Gus Williams 29; Rebs: Paul Silas 13; Asts: Paul Silas 4	Pts: Kareem Abdul-Jabbar 32; Rebs: Jamaal Wilkes 9 Asts: Norm Nixon 11
Seattle leads series, 2–1

The Forum, Inglewood, California
Attendance: 17,505
Referees: Jake O'Donnell, Paul Mihalak, Jess Kersey

April 22

Boxscore

Seattle SuperSonics 117, Los Angeles Lakers 115
Scoring by quarter: 28–31, 33–29, 34–30, 22–25
Pts: Gus Williams 30; Rebs: D. Johnson, Sikma 11 each Asts: Dennis Johnson 7	Pts: Kareem Abdul-Jabbar 31; Rebs: Kareem Abdul-Jabbar 13; Asts: Norm Nixon 19
Seattle leads series, 3–1

The Forum, Inglewood, California
Attendance: 15,724
Referees: Jack Madden, Ed Rush, Tommy Nunez

April 25

Boxscore

Los Angeles Lakers 100, Seattle SuperSonics 106
Scoring by quarter: 28–24, 31–29, 22–29, 19–24
Pts: Kareem Abdul-Jabbar 25; Rebs: Kareem Abdul-Jabbar 14; Asts: Abdul-Jabbar, Nixon 8 each	Pts: Gus Williams 30; Rebs: Jack Sikma 10; Asts: Jack Sikma 6
Seattle wins series, 4–1

Seattle Center Coliseum, Seattle, Washington
Attendance: 14,098
Referees: Jake O'Donnell, Paul Mihalak, Lee Jones

- This would be the last playoff series for Los Angeles without Magic Johnson until 1992.

This was the second playoff meeting between these two teams, with the SuperSonics winning the first meeting.

Previous playoff series
Seattle leads 1–0 in all-time playoff series

1978

Los Angeles Lakers 1, Seattle SuperSonics 2

1978 Western Conference First Round

==== (2) Kansas City Kings vs. (3) Phoenix Suns ====
April 17

Boxscore

Kansas City Kings 99, Phoenix Suns 102
Scoring by quarter: 30–31, 28–18, 15–22, 26–31
Pts: Otis Birdsong 20; Rebs: Sam Lacey 12; Asts: Phil Ford 7	Pts: Paul Westphal 25; Rebs: Truck Robinson 12; Asts: Don Buse 5
Phoenix leads series, 1–0

Arizona Veterans Memorial Coliseum, Phoenix, Arizona
Attendance: 12,660

April 20

Boxscore

Phoenix Suns 91, Kansas City Kings 111
Scoring by quarter: 21–35, 21–26, 28–26, 21–24
Pts: Truck Robinson 17; Rebs: Truck Robinson 13; Asts: Walter Davis 5	Pts: Otis Birdsong 23; Rebs: Scott Wedman 10; Asts: Phil Ford 9
Series tied, 1–1

Kemper Arena, Kansas City, Missouri
Attendance: 13,659

April 22

Boxscore

Kansas City Kings 93, Phoenix Suns 108
Scoring by quarter: 24–27, 24–31, 21–32, 24–18
Pts: Wedman, Birdsong 22 each Rebs: Bill Robinzine 10; Asts: three players 5 each	Pts: Walter Davis 22; Rebs: Alvan Adams 9 Asts: Walter Davis 7
Phoenix leads series, 2–1

Arizona State University Activity Center, Tempe, Arizona
Attendance: 14,301

April 25

Boxscore

Phoenix Suns 108, Kansas City Kings 94
Scoring by quarter: 25–25, 27–20, 26–29, 30–20
Pts: Paul Westphal 26; Rebs: Gar Heard 14; Asts: Alvan Adams 8	Pts: Scott Wedman 21; Rebs: Sam Lacey 13; Asts: Lacey, Ford 5 each
Phoenix leads series, 3–1

Kemper Arena, Kansas City, Missouri
Attendance: 13,184

April 27

Boxscore

Kansas City Kings 99, Phoenix Suns 120
Scoring by quarter: 21–30, 25–40, 23–25, 30–25
Pts: Otis Birdsong 21; Rebs: Sam Lacey 10; Asts: Billy McKinney 7	Pts: Paul Westphal 32; Rebs: Joel Kramer 11; Asts: Bratz, Kramer 5 each
Phoenix wins series, 4–1

Arizona Veterans Memorial Coliseum, Phoenix, Arizona
Attendance: 12,660
Referees: Joe Gushue, Lee Jones, Jack Madden

This was the first playoff meeting between these two teams.

== Conference finals ==
=== Eastern Conference finals ===
==== (1) Washington Bullets vs. (2) San Antonio Spurs ====
May 4

Boxscore

San Antonio Spurs 118, Washington Bullets 97
Scoring by quarter: 30–27, 25–25, 31–23, 32–22
Pts: George Gervin 34; Rebs: Larry Kenon 21; Asts: James Silas 4	Pts: Bob Dandridge 25; Rebs: Elvin Hayes 20; Asts: Tom Henderson 5
San Antonio leads series, 1–0

Capital Centre, Landover, Maryland
Attendance: 19,035

May 6

Boxscore

San Antonio Spurs 95, Washington Bullets 115
Scoring by quarter: 27–22, 26–27, 20–33, 22–33
Pts: Larry Kenon 25; Rebs: Larry Kenon 8 Asts: Olberding, Dietrick 3 each	Pts: Wes Unseld 26; Rebs: Wes Unseld 22; Asts: Tom Henderson 9
Series tied, 1–1

Capital Centre, Landover, Maryland
Attendance: 19,035

May 9

Boxscore

Washington Bullets 114, San Antonio Spurs 116
Scoring by quarter: 31–32, 27–24, 26–33, 30–27
Pts: Bob Dandridge 28; Rebs: Elvin Hayes 23; Asts: Wes Unseld 8	Pts: George Gervin 29; Rebs: Billy Paultz 12; Asts: Kenon, Gale 5 each
San Antonio leads series, 2–1

HemisFair Arena, San Antonio, Texas
Attendance: 15,318

May 11

Boxscore

Washington Bullets 102, San Antonio Spurs 118
Scoring by quarter: 19–24, 30–26, 23–34, 30–34
Pts: Elvin Hayes 23; Rebs: Wes Unseld 21; Asts: Bob Dandridge 9	Pts: George Gervin 42; Rebs: Larry Kenon 17; Asts: Silas, Gale 6 each
San Antonio leads series, 3–1

HemisFair Arena, San Antonio, Texas
Attendance: 16,055

May 13

Boxscore

San Antonio Spurs 103, Washington Bullets 107
Scoring by quarter: 30–28, 18–25, 22–31, 33–23
Pts: George Gervin 28; Rebs: Mark Olberding 13; Asts: James Silas 6	Pts: Elvin Hayes 24; Rebs: Elvin Hayes 22; Asts: Tom Henderson 9
San Antonio leads series, 3–2

Capital Centre, Landover, Maryland
Attendance: 19,035

May 16

Boxscore

Washington Bullets 108, San Antonio Spurs 100
Scoring by quarter: 30–23, 24–26, 24–29, 30–22
Pts: Elvin Hayes 25; Rebs: Elvin Hayes 14; Asts: Dandridge, Henderson 8 each	Pts: George Gervin 20; Rebs: Larry Kenon 15; Asts: James Silas 7
Series tied, 3–3

HemisFair Arena, San Antonio, Texas
Attendance: 16,055

May 18

Boxscore

San Antonio Spurs 105, Washington Bullets 107
Scoring by quarter: 21–18, 28–32, 33–26, 23–31
Pts: George Gervin 42; Rebs: Larry Kenon 11; Asts: James Silas 5	Pts: Bob Dandridge 37; Rebs: Elvin Hayes 15; Asts: Larry Wright 7
Washington wins series, 4–3

Capital Centre, Landover, Maryland
Attendance: 19,035

- Bob Dandridge hits series-winning shot with 8 seconds remaining; Washington becomes the 3rd team in NBA history to overcome a 3–1 series deficit.

This was the second playoff meeting between these two teams, with the Bullets winning the first meeting.

Previous playoff series
Washington leads 1–0 in all-time playoff series

1978

San Antonio Spurs 2, Washington Bullets 4

1978 Eastern Conference Semifinals

=== Western Conference finals ===
==== (1) Seattle SuperSonics vs. (3) Phoenix Suns ====
May 1

Boxscore

Phoenix Suns 93, Seattle SuperSonics 108
Scoring by quarter: 22–28, 22–24, 22–29, 27–27
Pts: Alvan Adams 18; Rebs: Alvan Adams 12; Asts: Adams, Davis 4 each	Pts: Gus Williams 27; Rebs: Jack Sikma 11; Asts: John Johnson 9
Seattle leads series, 1–0

Seattle Center Coliseum, Seattle, Washington
Attendance: 14,098
Referees: Ed Rush, John Vanak, Jim Capers

May 4

Boxscore

Phoenix Suns 97, Seattle SuperSonics 103
Scoring by quarter: 28–21, 21–26, 26–30, 22–26
Pts: Paul Westphal 29; Rebs: Truck Robinson 9 Asts: Buse, Davis 5 each	Pts: John Johnson 21; Rebs: Lonnie Shelton 15; Asts: Gus Williams 6
Seattle leads series, 2–0

Kingdome, Seattle, Washington
Attendance: 31,964
Referees: Joe Gushue, Jack Madden, Ed Middleton

May 6

Boxscore

Seattle SuperSonics 103, Phoenix Suns 113
Scoring by quarter: 30–31, 31–29, 14–22, 28–31
Pts: Gus Williams 35; Rebs: J. Johnson, Sikma 9 each Asts: Gus Williams 6	Pts: Paul Westphal 25; Rebs: Walter Davis 10; Asts: Paul Westphal 6
Seattle leads series, 2–1

Arizona Veterans Memorial Coliseum, Phoenix, Arizona
Attendance: 12,660
Referees: Darell Garretson, Bob Rakel, Dick Bavetta

May 8

Boxscore

Seattle SuperSonics 91, Phoenix Suns 100
Scoring by quarter: 24–31, 26–27, 27–23, 14–19
Pts: Gus Williams 22; Rebs: Lonnie Shelton 10; Asts: three players 3 each	Pts: Walter Davis 27; Rebs: Gar Heard 12; Asts: Paul Westphal 10
Series tied, 2–2

Arizona Veterans Memorial Coliseum, Phoenix, Arizona
Attendance: 12,660
Referees: Jake O'Donnell, Hugh Evans, Lee Jones

May 11

Boxscore

Phoenix Suns 99, Seattle SuperSonics 93
Scoring by quarter: 22–24, 19–22, 25–22, 33–25
Pts: Paul Westphal 27; Rebs: Truck Robinson 14; Asts: Paul Westphal 5	Pts: Dennis Johnson 24; Rebs: Jack Sikma 12; Asts: John Johnson 5
Phoenix leads series, 3–2

Kingdome, Seattle, Washington
Attendance: 28,935
Referees: Darell Garretson, Paul Mihalak, Wally Rooney

May 13

Boxscore

Seattle SuperSonics 106, Phoenix Suns 105
Scoring by quarter: 27–33, 28–17, 22–35, 29–20
Pts: Dennis Johnson 23; Rebs: Jack Sikma 10; Asts: Dennis Johnson 6	Pts: Paul Westphal 29; Rebs: Joel Kramer 8 Asts: Paul Westphal 8
Series tied, 3–3

Arizona Veterans Memorial Coliseum, Phoenix, Arizona
Attendance: 12,660
Referees: Jack Madden, John Vanak, Jim Capers

In a Mother's Day thriller, the game went down to the wire in intense fashion. The Sonics had just come back from a 8-point deficit in the 4th quarter and were leading 106–105 with 52 seconds to go in regulation. In the Suns' possession, Walter Davis appeared to have scored, but committed a traveling violation with 41 seconds left. On the next play, Sonics player Gus Williams' shot came up short. Phoenix grabbed the rebound and called timeout with 16 seconds left, with a chance to clinch their 2nd NBA Finals berth. Walter Davis' high-arc shot also came up short, and the ball went out-of-bounds last touched by a Sonics' player with one second left. The Suns' last chance, Gar Heard's potential game-winning shot, was an airball, meaning the SuperSonics forced a 7th game in Seattle on Thursday.

May 17

Boxscore

Phoenix Suns 110, Seattle SuperSonics 114
Scoring by quarter: 29–28, 24–29, 22–25, 35–32
Pts: Walter Davis 26; Rebs: Truck Robinson 14; Asts: Paul Westphal 9	Pts: Jack Sikma 33; Rebs: Jack Sikma 11; Asts: Fred Brown 5
Seattle wins series, 4–3

Kingdome, Seattle, Washington
Attendance: 37,552
Referees: Jake O'Donnell, Lee Jones, Joe Gushue

With the score 112–104 in favor of Seattle with just 20 seconds left, it appeared to be all over, but the Phoenix Suns would not quit easily. After the Suns scored 4 unanswered points, Paul Westphal stole an inbounds pass and drove to the basket for a score, getting fouled by Wally Walker. This made it a 2-point game and sent Westphal to the line with just 4 seconds left. Suns coach John MacLeod called a timeout to decide what to do on the free throw attempt. The Suns elected to intentionally miss and try to score off an offensive rebound, but the rebound went to the Sonics' Jack Sikma, who was intentionally fouled and made both free throws to give the Sonics the Western Conference for the 2nd straight year.

This was the second playoff meeting between these two teams, with the Suns winning the previous meeting.

Previous playoff series
Phoenix leads 1–0 in all-time playoff series

1976

Phoenix Suns 4, Seattle SuperSonics 2

1976 Western Conference Semifinals

== NBA Finals: (E1) Washington Bullets vs. (W1) Seattle SuperSonics ==
May 20

Boxscore

Seattle SuperSonics 97, Washington Bullets 99
Scoring by quarter: 25–26, 25–33, 21–23, 26–17
Pts: Gus Williams 32; Rebs: John Johnson 11; Asts: Dennis Johnson 7	Pts: Larry Wright 26; Rebs: Wes Unseld 12; Asts: Tom Henderson 6
Washington leads series, 1–0

Capital Centre, Landover, Maryland
Attendance: 19,035
Referees: Darell Garretson, Ed T. Rush, Ed Middleton

- Larry Wright makes the game winning free throws with one second remaining.

May 24

Boxscore

Seattle SuperSonics 92, Washington Bullets 82
Scoring by quarter: 28–23, 21–29, 19–14, 24–16
Pts: Gus Williams 23; Rebs: Jack Sikma 13; Asts: D. Johnson, J. Johnson 6 each	Pts: Bob Dandridge 21; Rebs: Elvin Hayes 14; Asts: Bob Dandridge 5
Series tied, 1–1

Capital Centre, Landover, Maryland
Attendance: 19,035
Referees: John Vanak, Jack Madden, Jim Capers

May 27

Boxscore

Washington Bullets 95, Seattle SuperSonics 105
Scoring by quarter: 25–31, 19–24, 22–26, 29–24
Pts: Bob Dandridge 28; Rebs: Unseld, Hayes 14 each Asts: Bob Dandridge 5	Pts: Gus Williams 31; Rebs: Jack Sikma 17; Asts: Dennis Johnson 9
Seattle leads series, 2–1

Kingdome, Seattle, Washington
Attendance: 35,928
Referees: Jake O'Donnell, Joe Gushue, Hugh Evans

May 29

Boxscore

Washington Bullets 112, Seattle SuperSonics 114 (OT)
Scoring by quarter: 16–24, 37–28, 28–32, 23–20, Overtime: 8–10
Pts: three players 18; Rebs: Wes Unseld 16; Asts: Tom Henderson 8	Pts: Gus Williams 36; Rebs: Jack Sikma 17; Asts: John Johnson 13
Seattle leads series, 3–1

Seattle Center Coliseum, Seattle, Washington
Attendance: 14,098
Referees: Bob Rakel, Lee Jones, Darell Garretson

- Dennis Johnson blocks Kevin Grevey with 4 seconds left to seal it.

June 1

Boxscore

Seattle SuperSonics 97, Washington Bullets 93
Scoring by quarter: 19–30, 24–21, 23–18, 31–24
Pts: Gus Williams 23; Rebs: Jack Sikma 17; Asts: John Johnson 6	Pts: Elvin Hayes 29; Rebs: Elvin Hayes 14; Asts: Bob Dandridge 7
Seattle wins series, 4–1

Capital Centre, Landover, Maryland
Attendance: 19,035
Referees: Jake O'Donnell, Joe Gushue, Paul Mihalak

This was the second Finals meeting between these two teams, with the Bullets winning the first meeting.

Previous playoff series
Washington leads 1–0 in all-time playoff series

1978

Seattle SuperSonics 3, Washington Bullets 4

1978 NBA Finals
