= List of NBA career playoff turnovers leaders =

This article provides two lists:

A list of National Basketball Association (NBA) players by total career Playoffs turnovers recorded.

A progressive list of turnover leaders showing how the record has increased through the years.

== Career playoff turnover leaders ==
This is a list of National Basketball Association players by total career Playoffs turnovers recorded.

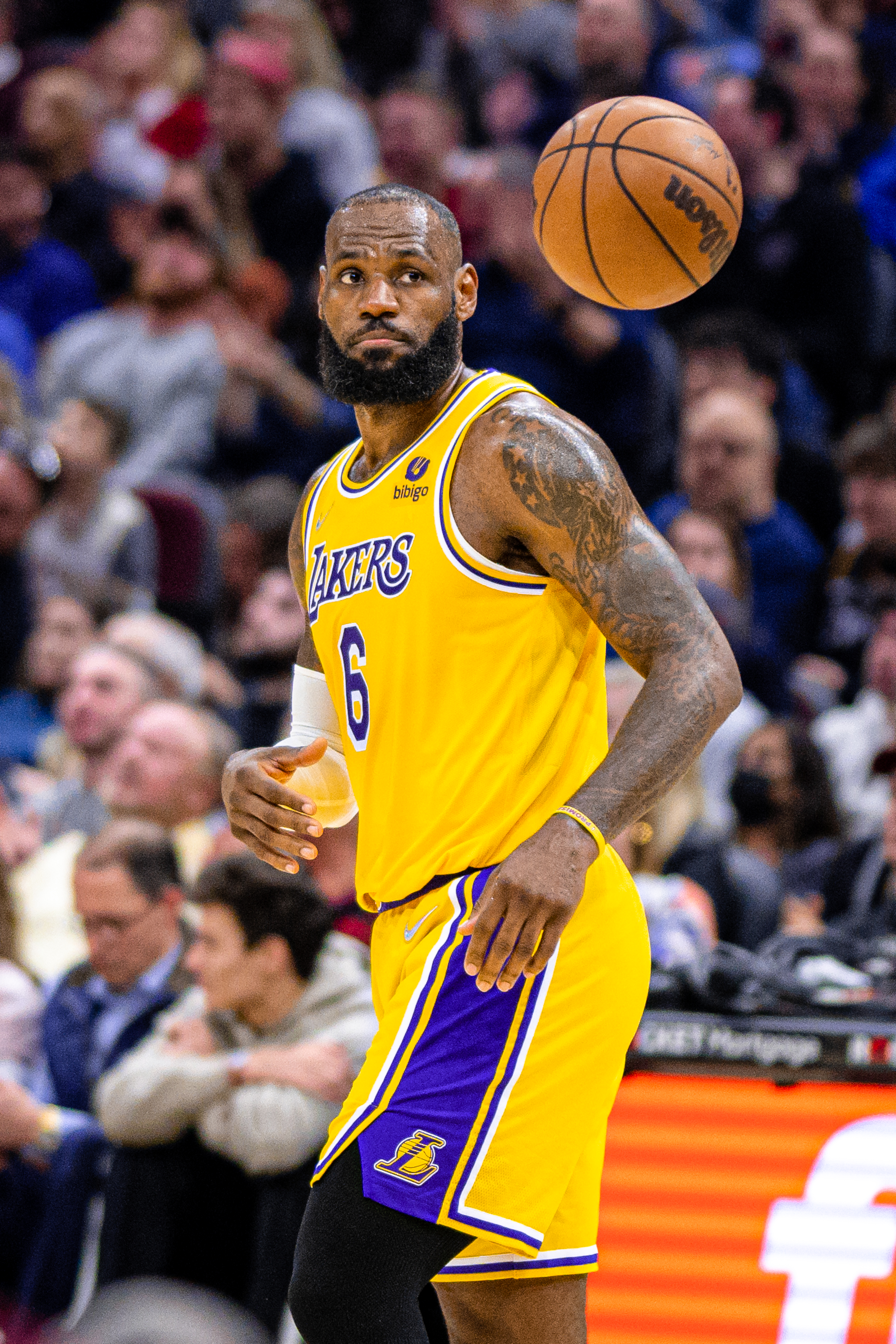
LeBron James has the most turnovers in NBA playoffs history.

^	Active NBA player
*	Inducted into the Naismith Memorial Basketball Hall of Fame
†	Not yet eligible for Hall of Fame consideration

Statistics accurate as of the 2026 NBA playoffs.

Rank	Player	Position(s)	Playoff team(s) played for (years)	Total turnovers	Games played	Turnovers per game average
1	LeBron James^	SF	Cleveland Cavaliers (2006–2010, 2015–2018); Miami Heat (2011–2014); Los Angeles Lakers (2020–2021, 2023–2026)	1,085	302	3.59
2	Magic Johnson*	PG	Los Angeles Lakers (1980–1991, 1996)	696	190	3.66
3	James Harden^	SG/PG	Oklahoma City Thunder (2010–2012), Houston Rockets (2013–2020); Brooklyn Nets (2021); Philadelphia 76ers (2022–2023); Los Angeles Clippers (2024–2025); Cleveland Cavaliers (2026)	674	191	3.53
4	Shaquille O'Neal*	C	Orlando Magic (1994–1996); Los Angeles Lakers (1997–2004); Miami Heat (2005–2007); Phoenix Suns (2008); Cleveland Cavaliers (2010); Boston Celtics (2011)	649	216	3.00
5	Kobe Bryant*	SG	Los Angeles Lakers (1997–2004, 2006–2012)	647	220	2.94
6	Tim Duncan*	PF/C	San Antonio Spurs (1998–1999, 2001–2016)	633	251	2.52
7	Scottie Pippen*	SF	Chicago Bulls (1988–1998); Houston Rockets (1999); Portland Trail Blazers (2000–2003)	602	208	2.89
8	Tony Parker*	PG	San Antonio Spurs (2002–2018)	594	226	2.63
9	Dwyane Wade*	SG	Miami Heat (2004–2007, 2009–2014, 2016, 2018); Chicago Bulls (2017)	583	177	3.29
10	Kevin Durant^	SF/PF	Oklahoma City Thunder (2010–2014, 2016); Golden State Warriors (2017–2019); Brooklyn Nets (2021–2022); Phoenix Suns (2023–2024); Houston Rockets (2026)	559	171	3.27
11	Karl Malone*	PF	Utah Jazz (1986–2003); Los Angeles Lakers (2004)	550	193	2.85
12	Michael Jordan*	SG	Chicago Bulls (1985–1993, 1995–1998)	546	179	3.05
13	John Stockton*	PG	Utah Jazz (1985–2003)	517	182	2.84
14	Stephen Curry^	PG	Golden State Warriors (2013–2019, 2022–2023, 2025)	516	155	3.33
15	Larry Bird*	SF/PF	Boston Celtics (1980–1988, 1990–1992)	506	164	3.09
16	Russell Westbrook^{†}	PG	Oklahoma City Thunder (2010–2014, 2016–2019); Houston Rockets (2020); Washington Wizards (2021); Los Angeles Clippers (2023–2024); Denver Nuggets (2025)	501	135	3.71
17	Manu Ginóbili*	SG	San Antonio Spurs (2003–2008, 2010–2018)	481	218	2.21
17	Dennis Johnson*	PG	Seattle SuperSonics (1978–1980); Phoenix Suns (1981–1983); Boston Celtics (1984–1990)	480	180	2.67
19	Paul Pierce*	SF	Boston Celtics (2002–2005, 2008–2013); Brooklyn Nets (2014); Washington Wizards (2015); Los Angeles Clippers (2016–2017)	476	170	2.80
20	Jason Kidd*	PG	Phoenix Suns (1997–2001); New Jersey Nets (2002–2007); Dallas Mavericks (2008–2012); New York Knicks (2013)	450	158	2.85
21	Kareem Abdul-Jabbar*	C	Milwaukee Bucks (1970–1974); Los Angeles Lakers (1977); Los Angeles Lakers (1978–1989)	447	169	2.64
21	Draymond Green^	PF	Golden State Warriors (2013–2019, 2022–2023, 2025)	447	169	2.64
23	Hakeem Olajuwon*	C	Houston Rockets (1985–1991, 1993–1999); Toronto Raptors (2002)	424	145	2.92
24	Clyde Drexler*	SG	Portland Trail Blazers (1984–1994); Houston Rockets (1995–1998)	397	145	2.74
25	Julius Erving*	SF	Philadelphia 76ers (1977); Philadelphia 76ers (1978–1987)	396	122	3.25
Rank	Player	Position(s)	Playoff team(s) played for (years)	Total turnovers	Games played	Turnovers per game average

== Progressive list of playoff turnover leaders ==
This is a progressive list of turnover leaders showing how the record increased through the years.

Statistics accurate as of the 2026 NBA playoffs.

^	Active NBA player
*	Inducted into the Naismith Memorial Basketball Hall of Fame

Team AbbreviationsTeam listed is the one player was on when he established the record.
BOS	Boston Celtics	HOU	Houston Rockets	NJN	New Jersey Nets	PHO	Phoenix Suns
CHI	Chicago Bulls	IND	Indiana Pacers	NYK	New York Knicks	TOR	Toronto Raptors
CLE	Cleveland Cavaliers	LAL	Los Angeles Lakers	OKC	Oklahoma City Thunder	UTA	Utah Jazz
DET	Detroit Pistons	MIA	Miami Heat	ORL	Orlando Magic	SEA	Seattle SuperSonics
GSW	Golden State Warriors	MIN	Minnesota Timberwolves	PHI	Philadelphia 76ers	WAS	Washington Wizards

NBA Progressive Leaders and Records for Turnovers for Every Season
Season	Year-by-year leader	TOV	Active player leader	TOV	Career record	TOV	Single-season record	TOV	Season
1977–78	Marvin WebsterSEA	74	Marvin WebsterSEA	74	Marvin WebsterSEA	74	Marvin WebsterSEA	74	1977–78
1978–79	Walter Davis*PHO	66	John JohnsonSEA	117	John JohnsonSEA	117	Marvin WebsterSEA	74	1978–79
1979–80	Magic Johnson*LAL	65	John JohnsonSEA	173	John JohnsonSEA	173	Marvin WebsterSEA	74	1979–80
1980–81	Larry Bird*BOS	62	Julius Erving*PHI	184	Julius Erving*PHI	184	Marvin WebsterSEA	74	1980–81
1981–82	Julius Erving*PHI Andrew ToneyPHI	67	Julius Erving*PHI	251	Julius Erving*PHI	251	Marvin WebsterSEA	74	1981–82
1982–83	Magic Johnson*LAL	64	Julius Erving*PHI	290	Julius Erving*PHI	290	Marvin WebsterSEA	74	1982–83
1983–84	Larry Bird*BOS	87	Julius Erving*PHI	311	Julius Erving*PHI	311	Larry Bird*BOS	87	1983–84
1984–85	Magic Johnson*LAL	76	Julius Erving*PHI	348	Julius Erving*PHI	348	Larry Bird*BOS	87	1984–85
1985–86	Ralph Sampson*HOU	71	Julius Erving*PHI	387	Julius Erving*PHI	387	Larry Bird*BOS	87	1985–86
1986–87	Larry Bird*BOS	71	Magic Johnson*LAL	435	Magic Johnson*LAL	435	Larry Bird*BOS	87	1986–87
1987–88	Isiah Thomas*DET	85	Magic Johnson*LAL	518	Magic Johnson*LAL	518	Larry Bird*BOS	87	1987–88
1988–89	Michael Jordan*CHI	68	Magic Johnson*LAL	571	Magic Johnson*LAL	571	Larry Bird*BOS	87	1988–89
1989–90	Isiah Thomas*DET	72	Magic Johnson*LAL	607	Magic Johnson*LAL	607	Larry Bird*BOS	87	1989–90
1990–91	Magic Johnson*LAL	77	Magic Johnson*LAL	684	Magic Johnson*LAL	684	Larry Bird*BOS	87	1990–91
1991–92	Michael Jordan*CHI	81	Larry Bird*BOS	506	Magic Johnson*LAL	684	Larry Bird*BOS	87	1991–92
1992–93	Kevin JohnsonPHO	84	Michael Jordan* CHI; Isiah Thomas*DET	369	Magic Johnson*LAL	684	Larry Bird*BOS	87	1992–93
1993–94	Hakeem Olajuwon*HOU; Patrick Ewing*NYK	83	Isiah Thomas*DET	369	Magic Johnson*LAL	684	Larry Bird*BOS	87	1993–94
1994–95	Shaquille O'Neal*ORL Penny HardawayORL	73	Michael Jordan*CHI	410	Magic Johnson*LAL	684	Larry Bird*BOS	87	1994–95
1995–96	Shawn KempSEA	80	Magic Johnson*LAL	696	Magic Johnson*LAL	696	Larry Bird*BOS	87	1995–96
1996–97	Alonzo Mourning*MIA	70	Michael Jordan*CHI	501	Magic Johnson*LAL	696	Larry Bird*BOS	87	1996–97
1997–98	Karl Malone*UTA	60	Michael Jordan*CHI	546	Magic Johnson*LAL	696	Larry Bird*BOS	87	1997–98
1998–99	Latrell SprewellNYK	58	Scottie Pippen*CHI	536	Magic Johnson*LAL	696	Larry Bird*BOS	87	1998–99
1999–00	Shaquille O'Neal*LAL	56	Scottie Pippen*CHI	573	Magic Johnson*LAL	696	Larry Bird*BOS	87	1999–00
2000–01	Allen Iverson*PHI	63	Scottie Pippen*CHI	585	Magic Johnson*LAL	696	Larry Bird*BOS	87	2000–01
2001–02	Jason Kidd*NJN	67	Scottie Pippen*CHI	595	Magic Johnson*LAL	696	Larry Bird*BOS	87	2001–02
2002–03	Jason Kidd*NJN	79	Scottie Pippen*CHI	602	Magic Johnson*LAL	696	Larry Bird*BOS	87	2002–03
2003–04	Kevin Garnett*MIN	75	Scottie Pippen*CHI	602	Magic Johnson*LAL	696	Larry Bird*BOS	87	2003–04
2004–05	Richard HamiltonDET	78	Shaquille O'Neal*; MIA 2005–07; PHO 2008–09; CLE 2009–10; BOS 2010–11	517	Magic Johnson*LAL	696	Larry Bird*BOS	87	2004–05
2005–06	Dwyane Wade*MIA	90	Shaquille O'Neal*; MIA 2005–07; PHO 2008–09; CLE 2009–10; BOS 2010–11	602	Magic Johnson*LAL	696	Dwyane Wade*MIA	90	2005–06
2006–07	Deron WilliamsUTA	68	Shaquille O'Neal*; MIA 2005–07; PHO 2008–09; CLE 2009–10; BOS 2010–11	616	Magic Johnson*LAL	696	Dwyane Wade*MIA	90	2006–07
2007–08	Paul Pierce*BOS	82	Shaquille O'Neal*; MIA 2005–07; PHO 2008–09; CLE 2009–10; BOS 2010–11	625	Magic Johnson*LAL	696	Dwyane Wade*MIA	90	2007–08
2008–09	Dwight Howard*ORL	67	Shaquille O'Neal*; MIA 2005–07; PHO 2008–09; CLE 2009–10; BOS 2010–11	625	Magic Johnson*LAL	696	Dwyane Wade*MIA	90	2008–09
2009–10	Kobe Bryant*LAL	79	Shaquille O'Neal*; MIA 2005–07; PHO 2008–09; CLE 2009–10; BOS 2010–11	649	Magic Johnson*LAL	696	Dwyane Wade*MIA	90	2009–10
2010–11	Russell Westbrook^{†}OKC	78	Shaquille O'Neal*; MIA 2005–07; PHO 2008–09; CLE 2009–10; BOS 2010–11	649	Magic Johnson*LAL	696	Dwyane Wade*MIA	90	2010–11
2011–12	LeBron James^MIA	81	Kobe Bryant*LAL	647	Magic Johnson*LAL	696	Dwyane Wade*MIA	90	2011–12
2012–13	Paul George^IND	75	Kobe Bryant*LAL	647	Magic Johnson*LAL	696	Dwyane Wade*MIA	90	2012–13
2013–14	Russell Westbrook^{†}OKC	83	Kobe Bryant*LAL	647	Magic Johnson*LAL	696	Dwyane Wade*MIA	90	2013–14
2014–15	Stephen Curry^GSW; LeBron James^CLE	82	Kobe Bryant*LAL	647	Magic Johnson*LAL	696	Dwyane Wade*MIA	90	2014–15
2015–16	Russell Westbrook^{†}OKC	78	LeBron James^ CLE 2016–18; LAL 2018–26	700	LeBron James^ CLE 2016–18; LAL 2018–26	700	Dwyane Wade*MIA	90	2015–16
2016–17	LeBron James^CLE	72	LeBron James^ CLE 2016–18; LAL 2018–26	772	LeBron James^ CLE 2016–18; LAL 2018–26	772	Dwyane Wade*MIA	90	2016–17
2017–18	LeBron James^CLE	94	LeBron James^ CLE 2016–18; LAL 2018–26	866	LeBron James^ CLE 2016–18; LAL 2018–26	866	LeBron James^CLE	94	2017–18
2018–19	Draymond Green^GSW	83	LeBron James^ CLE 2016–18; LAL 2018–26	866	LeBron James^ CLE 2016–18; LAL 2018–26	866	LeBron James^CLE	94	2018–19
2019–20	LeBron James^LAL	84	LeBron James^ CLE 2016–18; LAL 2018–26	950	LeBron James^ CLE 2016–18; LAL 2018–26	950	LeBron James^CLE	94	2019–20
2020–21	Devin Booker^PHO	81	LeBron James^ CLE 2016–18; LAL 2018–26	975	LeBron James^ CLE 2016–18; LAL 2018–26	975	LeBron James^CLE	94	2020–21
2021–22	Jayson Tatum^BOS	100	LeBron James^ CLE 2016–18; LAL 2018–26	975	LeBron James^ CLE 2016–18; LAL 2018–26	975	Jayson Tatum^BOS	100	2021–22
2022–23	Nikola Jokić^DEN	70	LeBron James^ CLE 2016–18; LAL 2018–26	1,015	LeBron James^ CLE 2016–18; LAL 2018–26	1,015	Jayson Tatum^BOS	100	2022–23
2023–24	Luka Dončić^DAL	90	LeBron James^ CLE 2016–18; LAL 2018–26	1,034	LeBron James^ CLE 2016–18; LAL 2018–26	1,034	Jayson Tatum^BOS	100	2023–24
2024–25	Shai Gilgeous-Alexander^OKC	60	LeBron James^ CLE 2016–18; LAL 2018–26	1,047	LeBron James^ CLE 2016–18; LAL 2018–26	1,047	Jayson Tatum^BOS	100	2024–25
2025–26	James Harden^CLE	84	LeBron James^ CLE 2016–18; LAL 2018–26	1,085	LeBron James^ CLE 2016–18; LAL 2018–26	1,085	Jayson Tatum^BOS	100	2025–26
Season	Year-by-year leader	TOV	Active player leader	TOV	Career record	TOV	Single-season record	TOV	Season

== See also ==
- Basketball statistics
- NBA post-season records
