= Dennis Johnson =

American former basketball player (1954–2007)

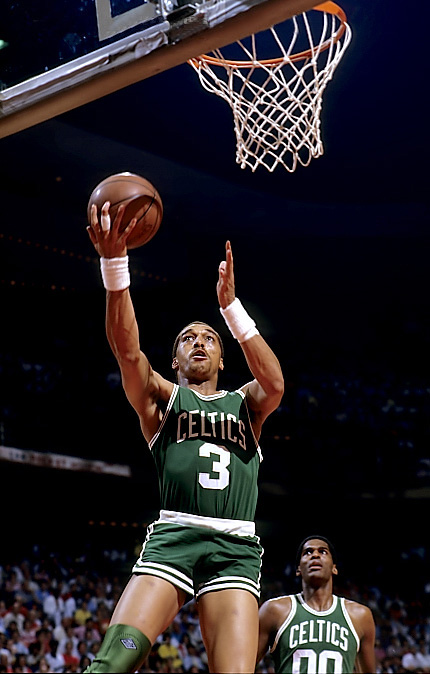
- Johnson going for a layup with Robert Parish in the background

Personal information
- Born: September 18, 1954 Los Angeles, California, U.S.
- Died: February 22, 2007 (aged 52) Austin, Texas, U.S.
- Listed height: 6 ft 4 in (1.93 m)
- Listed weight: 185 lb (84 kg)

Career information
- High school: Dominguez (Compton, California)
- College: LA Harbor College (1973–1975); Pepperdine (1975–1976)
- NBA draft: 1976: 2nd round, 29th overall pick
- Drafted by: Seattle SuperSonics
- Playing career: 1976–1990
- Position: Point guard / shooting guard
- Number: 24, 3
- Coaching career: 1993–2007

Career history

Playing
- 1976–1980: Seattle SuperSonics
- 1980–1983: Phoenix Suns
- 1983–1990: Boston Celtics

Career highlights
- 3× NBA champion (1979, 1984, 1986); NBA Finals MVP (1979); 5× NBA All-Star (1979–1982, 1985); All-NBA First Team (1981); All-NBA Second Team (1980); 6× NBA All-Defensive First Team (1979–1983, 1987); 3× NBA All-Defensive Second Team (1984–1986); No. 3 retired by Boston Celtics

Career NBA statistics
- Points: 15,535 (14.1 ppg)
- Assists: 5,499 (5.0 apg)
- Steals: 1,477 (1.3 spg)
- Stats at NBA.com
- Stats at Basketball Reference
- Basketball Hall of Fame

Dennis Wayne Johnson (September 18, 1954 – February 22, 2007), nicknamed "DJ", was an American professional basketball player for the National Basketball Association's (NBA) Seattle SuperSonics, Phoenix Suns, and Boston Celtics. He was a coach of the Los Angeles Clippers and an alumnus of Dominguez High School, Los Angeles Harbor College and Pepperdine University.

Johnson overcame early struggles to have a successful NBA playing career. Drafted 29th overall in 1976 by the Seattle SuperSonics, Johnson began his professional career as a shooting guard. He eventually led the Sonics to their only NBA championship in 1979, winning the Finals MVP Award. After three seasons with the Phoenix Suns, he became the starting point guard for the Boston Celtics, with whom he won two more championships. Johnson was voted into five All-Star Teams, one All-NBA First and one Second Team, and nine consecutive All-Defensive First and Second Teams.

The Celtics retired Johnson's No. 3 jersey, which hangs from the rafters of the TD Garden, the team's home arena. The Naismith Memorial Basketball Hall of Fame inducted Johnson posthumously in 2010. Some sports journalists consider him among the most underrated players of all time.

== Early life ==
Dennis Wayne Johnson was born the eighth of 16 children, to a social worker and a bricklayer who lived in Compton, California, a suburb of Los Angeles. Originally a baseball fan and a Little Leaguer, Johnson learned basketball from his father, but seemed to have neither the size nor the talent to compete with his peers: as a teenager at Dominguez High School, Johnson measured just 5'9" and played only "a minute or two each game". After high school, he worked several odd jobs, including a $2.75-per-hour job as a forklift driver, and played with his brothers in summer league games after work. During this period, Johnson grew to 6'3", and developed what some later described as "rocket launcher legs", which enabled him to jump high to grab rebounds against taller opponents.

== College career ==
Jim White, the coach at Los Angeles Harbor College, had watched Johnson play street basketball and felt that Johnson excelled in defense, so White asked him to enroll. Johnson gave up his jobs and developed into a promising young guard, averaging 18.3 points and 12.0 rebounds per game and leading Harbor to a junior college state title. However, the young guard lacked discipline, often clashed with White and was thrown off the team three times in two years.

At the end of his junior college career, two universities offered Johnson scholarships: Azusa Pacific University and Pepperdine University. Johnson chose the latter, and in his only year there, he averaged 15.7 points, 5.8 rebounds and 3.3 assists per game, and developed a reputation for tough defense. After that year, Johnson made himself eligible for the 1976 NBA draft, but was skeptical that any team would take him. NBA teams were wary of drafting a player with character issues, and Johnson was known to be a troublemaker.

== Professional career ==
=== Seattle SuperSonics (1976–1980) ===
The Seattle SuperSonics took Johnson in the second round of the 1976 draft with the 29th pick and gave him a four-year contract; he earned a salary of $45,000 in the first year and $90,000 in the last. In his rookie year, the 1976–77 NBA season, Johnson, playing backup to the experienced Sonics backcourt tandem of Slick Watts and Fred Brown, averaged 9.2 points and 1.5 assists per game. The Sonics finished with a 40–42 record and missed the 1977 NBA Playoffs, leading head coach Bill Russell to resign. In the following season, the team lost 17 of the first 22 games under Russell's replacement Bob Hopkins, who was replaced by Hall of Fame coach Lenny Wilkens, who gave Johnson a starting spot and paired him with free-agent acquisition Gus Williams, a prolific scorer, with whom he formed a dynamic backcourt duo. Johnson revelled in this new role, improving his averages to 12.7 points and 2.8 assists per game. During this period Johnson played shooting guard and was known for his aggressive slam dunking, in contrast to the more cerebral roles he played later in his career. It was at this time that Johnson's nickname "DJ" was coined by play-by-play announcer Bob Blackburn, to help distinguish him from teammates, John Johnson and Vinnie Johnson (whom Blackburn referred to as "JJ" and "VJ", respectively).

Finishing strongly, the Sonics ended the regular season with a 47–35 record and made the 1978 NBA Playoffs. After eliminating the Los Angeles Lakers, the defending champion Portland Trail Blazers, and the Denver Nuggets, they almost defeated the Washington Bullets by taking a 3–2 lead in the 1978 NBA Finals. In a 93–92 Game 3 victory, Johnson blocked seven shots—the most blocks in NBA Finals history for a guard. The Sonics lost in seven games, however, partly because of Johnson's Game 7 scoring drought, in which the second-year guard missed all of his 14 field goal attempts. Johnson later acknowledged that he simply "choked"; he vowed never to repeat this again and credited this game as an important lesson to become a better player.

Johnson and the Sonics got their revenge in the 1978–79 season. After clinching the Pacific Division with a 52–30 record, the team met the Bullets again in the 1979 NBA Finals. After losing Game 1, the Sonics won the next four games to take the finals series, helped by Johnson who averaged almost 23 points along with six rebounds and assists per game. He scored 32 points in a Game 4 overtime victory, and was named NBA Finals MVP. As a 2nd round, 29th overall NBA draft pick, he was the lowest drafted player to win the award until surpassed by Nikola Jokić (2014 41st overall, 2023 MVP) and Jalen Brunson (2018 33rd overall, 2026 MVP). It was during this season that Johnson established himself as one of the best guards in the league; he averaged 15.9 points and 3.5 assists per game, and made his first All-Defensive First Team and All-Star Game appearance.

During the following season, Johnson averaged 19.0 points and 4.1 assists, appeared in his second All-Star Game and was named to the All-Defensive First Team and All-NBA Second Team. The Sonics, however, lost in the Western Conference Finals to the Lakers, who had Hall of Famers Jamaal Wilkes, Magic Johnson and Kareem Abdul-Jabbar. Because of the abundance of talent on the Sonics team, Johnson later called this loss one of the worst disappointments of his professional career.

Coach Wilkens grew tired of Johnson, who often clashed with him and was perceived as a growing liability to the team. At the end of the season, Johnson was traded to the Phoenix Suns for Paul Westphal and draft picks. The Sonics' record was 22 games worse the next season despite, or perhaps because of, the addition of Westphal.

=== Phoenix Suns (1980–1983) ===
Johnson further established himself as a quality player in Phoenix. In his three years as a Sun, Johnson averaged 14–20 points a game and provided tough defense. He played in two All-Star Games, was voted into three consecutive All-Defensive First Teams and earned his only All-NBA First Team appearance. In this period Johnson, like in Seattle, played shooting guard and became the main scorer on the team, as opposed to being the second or third option as a Sonic.

In the first two years of Johnson's stint, the Suns were fairly successful, reaching the Western Conference Semifinals both seasons. The Suns bowed out in the first round in Johnson's last year. Johnson's situation deteriorated towards the end of his career at Phoenix. Like in Seattle, he often clashed with his coach, John MacLeod, and finally was traded by general manager, Jerry Colangelo, to the Boston Celtics for Rick Robey and draft picks. Like Seattle after Johnson's departure, the Suns finished 12 games worse in the next season despite the addition of Robey.

Later in the height of Johnson's career, he would be one of multiple players implicated in a drug scandal that occurred during his time spent with the Suns, according to a mention by former teammate Johnny High, though Johnson vehemently denied using cocaine or any other illicit drugs during that period of time.

=== Boston Celtics (1983–1990) ===
Between the 1979–80 season and the 1981–82 season, the Celtics had lost to the Philadelphia 76ers in the Eastern Conference Finals two out of three times, mainly because physical Sixers guard Andrew Toney routinely caused problems for their defensively fragile backcourt. After subsequently getting swept by the Bucks in the 1982–83 Eastern Conference Semifinals, Celtics general manager Red Auerbach added the perennial All-Defensive Team member Johnson to his squad, hoping that Johnson would help the Celtics fare better in the Eastern Conference playoffs (particularly against the 76ers). Johnson joined a squad that included Hall of Fame forwards Larry Bird and Kevin McHale and Hall of Fame center Robert Parish, a trio that has been described as the best NBA frontcourt of all time. Johnson described joining the Celtics as a "dream come true" and enjoyed the tutelage of highly successful general manager Auerbach, who was "living history" according to Johnson.

With the Celtics Johnson changed his playing style for the third time in his career: after being known as a slam dunking shooting guard with the Sonics, and an all-around scorer with the Suns, he now established himself as a point guard who was defined more by playmaking than scoring. In his first year as a Celtic, he averaged 13.2 points and 4.2 assists and was elected to the All-Defensive Second Team. The Celtics reached the 1984 NBA Finals, where they met the Los Angeles Lakers, their intense rivals since the 1960s. The Celtics won 4–3, and Johnson took credit for playing smothering defense on Hall of Fame Lakers playmaker Earvin Johnson, limiting him to a sub-average 17 points in the last four games, and being at least partly responsible for several of the Laker point guard's game-deciding errors in Games 2, 4 and 7. As a result, Magic Johnson was taunted as "Tragic Johnson" whenever the Lakers and Celtics played against each other.

In the 1984–85 season, Johnson continued playing smothering defense, earning his next All-Defensive Second Team call-up while averaging 16.9 points and 7.3 assists per game. The Celtics met the Lakers in the 1985 NBA Finals again. Johnson's big moment came in Game 4: when the score was tied at 105, teammate Larry Bird had the ball in the last seconds. Being double-teamed by Lakers Kareem Abdul-Jabbar and Magic Johnson, Bird passed to the open Johnson, and the guard sank a 19-ft buzzer beater to win the game. The Lakers, however, took their revenge this time, winning the series in six games, powered by venerable 38-year-old Finals MVP Abdul-Jabbar. Johnson described this loss as one of the toughest in his career, because the Celtics were "close [to winning the series]", but "could not get the job done".

In the following season the Celtics made the playoffs, helped by the performance of Johnson, who made the All-Defensive Second Team again while tallying 17.8 points and 6.7 assists per game. After defeating the Milwaukee Bucks in the Eastern Conference Finals, the Celtics reached the 1986 NBA Finals against the up-and-coming Houston Rockets, led by the "Twin Towers" of centers Ralph Sampson and Hakeem Olajuwon. Led by Finals MVP Larry Bird, the Celtics beat the Rockets 4–2, and Johnson won his third title.

The Celtics were unable to repeat their title in 1987 despite several dramatic playoff victories. Johnson played strong defense again, earning yet another appearance on the All-Defensive First Team, and the Celtics embarked on a nail-biting playoff campaign. In the 1987 Eastern Conference Semifinals, the Celtics split the first six games against the Milwaukee Bucks. In the deciding Game 7, which the Celtics won, Johnson had a spectacular play with 1:30 left in the game: a Celtics ball threatened to fly out of bounds, but Johnson dived for it and whipped it backward in mid-air against Bucks center and former Sonics teammate Jack Sikma. The ball bounced off Sikma before going out of bounds, and the Celtics maintained possession.

In the next round the 1987 Eastern Conference Finals, the Celtics faced the Detroit Pistons. The series was described as a grudge match between two intense rivals, featuring a great level of personal animosity, sharp rhetoric, and several physical altercations. The center of this feud was Pistons pivot Bill Laimbeer, who brawled with Celtics players Bird and Parish. In Game 5 Johnson was involved in a crucial play: down 107–106, Larry Bird stole the in-bounds pass by Pistons point guard Isiah Thomas with 5 seconds left and passed it to a sprinting Johnson, who converted a difficult layup with 1 second left in the game. This play caused Celtics broadcaster Johnny Most to shout out one of his most famous calls:

Now there's a steal by Bird! Underneath to DJ who lays it in! Right at one second left! What a play by Bird! Bird stole the in-bounding pass, laid it up to DJ, and DJ laid it up and in, and Boston has a one-point lead with one second left! Oh my, this place is going crazy!!!

According to Johnson this was his favorite play of all time. Games 6 and 7 also featured a feud, this time between Pistons forward Dennis Rodman and Johnson. In Game 6, which the Pistons won, Rodman taunted Johnson in the closing seconds by waving his right hand over his head. When the Celtics took Game 7, Johnson went back at Rodman in the last moments of the game and mimicked his taunting gesture. In the 1987 NBA Finals, however, the Celtics succumbed to the Los Angeles Lakers 4–2 as Lakers playmaker and Finals MVP Magic Johnson put up a great performance, averaging 26 points and 13 assists throughout the series.

The next three seasons were disappointing for the aging Celtics. In the 1987–88 season, Johnson averaged 12.6 points and 7.8 assists, but in the 1988 Playoffs, the Celtics were unable to beat the Detroit Pistons in the Eastern Conference Finals. In the next season, Johnson (who statistically declined to 10.0 points and 6.6 assists per game) and his team made the 1989 NBA Playoffs on a meager 42–40 record (largely due to the absence of star forward Larry Bird for almost the entire season), but were immediately eliminated in the first round (again, largely due to the absence of the injured Larry Bird). The following 1989–90 NBA season was Johnson's last. The now 35-year-old playmaker relinquished his starting point guard role to younger John Bagley, but when Bagley dislocated his shoulder, Johnson returned with a high level of performance and was lovingly called "our glue man" by coach Jimmy Rodgers. In that season, Johnson started in 65 of his 75 games, averaging 7.1 points and 6.5 assists, but the Celtics failed to get past the first round of the 1990 NBA Playoffs.

Johnson retired after the Celtics did not offer him a new contract at the beginning of the 1991 season. During his retirement ceremony, his perennial Los Angeles Lakers opponent Magic Johnson telegraphed him lauding him as "the best backcourt defender of all-time". In addition Celtics colleague and triple NBA Most Valuable Player award winner Larry Bird called Johnson the best teammate he ever had.

== Post-player career ==
After retiring as a player, Johnson worked as a scout for the Celtics. Johnson later worked as a scout for the Portland Trail Blazers.

== Coaching career ==
=== Boston Celtics (1993–1997) ===
Johnson started as an assistant coach in 1993, under then-head coach Chris Ford. Johnson stayed on staff when M.L. Carr became the Celtics' head coach in 1995. Johnson was viewed as being on track to becoming the Celtics' head coach after Carr, but was fired in 1997 by then-General Manager Rick Pitino. The firing stemmed from an incident in October 1997 when Johnson was disciplined for an improper intimate relationship with a female staff member, thus ending his assistant coaching career and potential head coaching career.

=== Los Angeles Clippers (2000–2003) ===
After spending several years outside the limelight, he returned as an assistant coach for the Los Angeles Clippers in 2000 and spent four seasons there. Johnson served as interim head coach after the departure of Alvin Gentry for 24 games near the end of the 2002–03 season.

=== Florida Flame (2004–2005) ===
In 2004, Johnson was named head coach of the NBA Development League's Florida Flame.

=== Austin Toros (2005–2007) ===
Johnson became head coach of the NBA Development League's Austin Toros the following season, holding the position until his death two years later.

== NBA career statistics ==
Legend
GP	Games played	GS	Games started	MPG	Minutes per game
FG%	Field goal percentage	3P%	3-point field goal percentage	FT%	Free throw percentage
RPG	Rebounds per game	APG	Assists per game	SPG	Steals per game
BPG	Blocks per game	PPG	Points per game	**Bold**	Career high
†	Won an NBA championship

=== Regular season ===
Year	Team	GP	GS	MPG	FG%	3P%	FT%	RPG	APG	SPG	BPG	PPG
1976–77	Seattle	**81**	–	20.6	**.504**	–	.624	3.7	1.5	1.5	0.7	9.2
1977–78	Seattle	**81**	–	27.3	.417	–	.732	3.6	2.8	1.5	0.6	12.7
1978–79†	Seattle	80	–	34.0	.434	–	.781	4.7	3.5	1.3	**1.2**	15.9
1979–80	Seattle	**81**	–	36.3	.422	.207	.780	**5.1**	4.1	**1.8**	1.0	19.0
1980–81	Phoenix	79	–	33.1	.436	.216	.820	4.6	3.7	1.7	0.8	18.8
1981–82	Phoenix	80	77	36.7	.470	.190	.806	**5.1**	4.6	1.3	0.7	**19.5**
1982–83	Phoenix	77	74	33.1	.462	.161	.791	4.4	5.0	1.3	0.5	14.2
1983–84†	Boston	80	**78**	33.3	.437	.125	.852	3.5	4.2	1.2	0.7	13.2
1984–85	Boston	80	77	**37.2**	.462	**.269**	.853	4.0	6.8	1.2	0.5	15.7
1985–86†	Boston	78	**78**	35.0	.455	.143	.818	3.4	5.8	1.4	0.4	15.6
1986–87	Boston	79	**78**	37.1	.444	.113	.833	3.3	7.5	1.1	0.5	13.4
1987–88	Boston	77	74	34.7	.438	.261	**.856**	3.1	**7.8**	1.2	0.4	12.6
1988–89	Boston	72	72	32.1	.434	.140	.821	2.6	6.6	1.3	0.3	10.0
1989–90	Boston	75	65	27.1	.434	.042	.843	2.7	6.5	1.1	0.2	7.1
Career		1,100	673	32.7	.445	.172	.797	3.9	5.0	1.3	0.6	14.1
All-Star		5	0	19.6	.541	–	.864	3.6	1.8	1.0	0.8	11.8

=== Playoffs ===
Year	Team	GP	GS	MPG	FG%	3P%	FT%	RPG	APG	SPG	BPG	PPG
1978	Seattle	22	–	37.6	.412	–	.704	4.6	3.3	1.0	1.0	16.1
1979†	Seattle	17	–	40.1	.450	–	.771	6.1	4.1	1.6	**1.5**	20.9
1980	Seattle	15	–	38.8	.410	.333	.839	4.3	3.8	1.8	0.7	17.1
1981	Phoenix	7	–	38.1	.473	.200	.762	4.7	2.9	1.3	1.3	19.6
1982	Phoenix	7	–	38.7	.477	.000	.769	4.4	4.6	2.1	0.6	**22.3**
1983	Phoenix	3	–	36.0	.458	.000	.833	**7.7**	5.7	1.7	0.7	18.0
1984†	Boston	22	–	36.7	.404	**.429**	.867	3.6	4.4	1.1	0.3	16.6
1985	Boston	21	21	40.4	.445	.000	.860	4.0	7.3	1.5	0.4	17.3
1986†	Boston	18	18	39.7	.445	.375	.798	4.2	5.9	**2.2**	0.3	16.2
1987	Boston	**23**	**23**	**41.9**	.465	.115	.850	4.0	**8.9**	0.7	0.3	18.9
1988	Boston	17	17	41.3	.433	.375	.796	4.5	8.2	1.4	0.5	15.9
1989	Boston	3	1	19.7	.267	–	–	1.3	3.0	1.0	0.0	2.7
1990	Boston	5	5	32.4	**.484**	.333	**1.000**	2.8	5.6	0.4	0.4	13.8
Career		180	85	38.9	.439	.239	.802	4.3	5.6	1.4	0.6	17.3

== Head coaching record ==
Legend
Regular season	G	Games coached	W	Games won	L	Games lost	W–L %	Win–loss %
Playoffs	PG	Playoff games	PW	Playoff wins	PL	Playoff losses	PW–L %	Playoff win–loss %

Team	Year	G	W	L	W–L%	Finish	PG	PW	PL	PW–L%	Result
L.A. Clippers	2002–03	24	8	16	.333	7th in Pacific	—	—	—	—	Missed playoffs
Career		24	8	16	.333		—	—	—	—	

== Legacy ==
In 1991, the Boston Celtics retired a no. 3 jersey with Dennis Johnson's name.

In 1,100 games, Johnson scored 15,535 points, grabbed 4,249 rebounds and gave 5,499 assists, translating to career averages of 14.1 points, 3.9 rebounds and 5.0 assists per game. Known as a defensive stalwart, he was elected into nine straight All-Defensive First or Second Teams. NBA legend George Gervin said in a podcast with journalist Bill Simmons that Johnson was the best defender he ever played against. Johnson is also acknowledged by the NBA as a "money player" who was clutch in decisive moments, such as scoring 32 points for his team in a Game 4 overtime victory in the 1979 NBA Finals, playing smothering defense on Magic Johnson in the 1984 NBA Finals, and converting a last-second layup in Game 5 of the 1987 Eastern Conference Finals after a Larry Bird steal.

Furthermore, Johnson is lauded by the NBA as a versatile all-around weapon who played with "contagious competitiveness" and was known for his durability: in 14 NBA seasons, he played in 1,100 of a possible 1,148 games and participated in 180 playoff games, the latter figure the 11th highest number of all time. At his retirement, Johnson was only the 11th NBA player to amass more than 15,000 points and 5,000 assists.

On December 13, 1991, the Celtics franchise retired his number 3 jersey. Johnson said he would always be a Boston Celtic, and remarked that seeing his number in the rafters gave him a "special feeling". However, Johnson did not live to see an induction into the Naismith Memorial Basketball Hall of Fame, a fact that has been a considerable point of debate with sports journalists. Bill Simmons of ESPN called his Hall of Fame snub an "ongoing injustice", stating that according to him, Joe Dumars – a Hall of Famer known for strong defense rather than spectacular scoring, like Johnson – was no better [a basketball player] than him. Colleague Ken Shouler called Johnson "one of the first guys I'd give a Hall [of Fame] pass". Contemporary Boston Celtics Hall of Fame forward Larry Bird gave Johnson ultimate praise, calling him the best teammate he ever had in his autobiography Drive, which is especially significant considering Bird's teammates included Hall of Famers Kevin McHale, Robert Parish, Bill Walton, and Tiny Archibald. On April 3, 2010, ESPN Boston reported that Johnson was posthumously elected to the Basketball Hall of Fame. This was officially confirmed two days later when the Hall released the list of 2010 inductees.

On October 26, 2007, a learning center was dedicated in Johnson's name in the Central Branch of the YMCA of Greater Boston. The center was made possible by the donations and effort of Larry Bird and M.L. Carr. Johnson's family, Danny Ainge, Carr, and members of the YMCA and local community were present for the ribbon-cutting ceremony. Donna Johnson said on behalf of her husband, "If Dennis were alive he would really appreciate the thought and love the idea of the Learning Center."

The NBA G League Coach of the Year Award is named after Johnson.

== Personal life ==
Dennis Johnson was married to Donna, his wife of 31 years, and had three children named Dwayne, Denise, and Daniel. Johnson was also known for his appearance: he had freckles and red-tinged hair. Dennis's brother, Joey, is a former Arizona State Sun Devils basketball star. Johnson's nephews are Nick, who appeared in 37 games with the 2014–15 Houston Rockets after being drafted by them in the 2nd Round of the 2014 NBA draft, and Chris, who appeared briefly in four games with the 2013–14 Arizona Wildcats college basketball team.

On October 20, 1997, Johnson was arrested and detained overnight for allegedly holding a knife to his wife's throat and threatening his 17-year-old son. Johnson was later charged with aggravated assault and was ordered to stay away from his family. The prosecutors dropped the case several months later after his wife declined to press charges. Johnson reportedly went to counseling to repair his marriage.

=== Death ===
On February 22, 2007, at the Austin Convention Center, Johnson had a heart attack and collapsed at the end of the Austin Toros' practice. After being rushed to a nearby hospital, he could not be revived and was later pronounced dead. Johnson was surrounded by his wife and his children. Johnson's death was met with shock throughout the NBA. Among others, contemporary Celtics colleague Danny Ainge called him one of "the most underrated players of all time [...] and one of the greatest Celtics acquisitions," and one-time rival Bill Laimbeer called him "a great player on a great ballclub."

== See also ==
- List of NBA career playoff scoring leaders
- List of NBA career playoff assists leaders
- List of NBA career playoff steals leaders
- List of NBA career playoff turnovers leaders
- List of NBA career playoff free throw scoring leaders
- List of NBA career playoff games played leaders
