= Marvin Webster =

American basketball player (1952–2009)

Personal information
- Born: April 13, 1952 Baltimore, Maryland, U.S.
- Died: April 4, 2009 (aged 56) Tulsa, Oklahoma, U.S.
- Listed height: 7 ft 1 in (2.16 m)
- Listed weight: 225 lb (102 kg)

Career information
- High school: Edmondson (Baltimore, Maryland)
- College: Morgan State (1971–1975)
- NBA draft: 1975: 1st round, 3rd overall pick
- Drafted by: Atlanta Hawks
- Playing career: 1975–1987
- Position: Center
- Number: 10, 40

Career history
- 1975–1977: Denver Nuggets
- 1977–1978: Seattle SuperSonics
- 1978–1984: New York Knicks
- 1986: Pensacola Tornados
- 1987: Milwaukee Bucks

Career highlights
- 3× MEAC Player of the Year (1973–1975)

Career ABA and NBA statistics
- Points: 4,302 (7.0 ppg)
- Rebounds: 4,218 (6.8 rpg)
- Blocks: 881 (1.4 bpg)
- Stats at NBA.com
- Stats at Basketball Reference
- Collegiate Basketball Hall of Fame

Marvin Nathaniel Webster (April 13, 1952 – April 4, 2009) was an American professional basketball player. He played one season in the American Basketball Association (ABA) and nine in the National Basketball Association (NBA) with the Denver Nuggets (1975–77), Seattle SuperSonics (1977–78), New York Knickerbockers (1978–84) and Milwaukee Bucks (1986–87). His nickname was the Human Eraser because of his impressive shot blocking talent.

== College career ==
Born in Baltimore, Maryland, the son of a Baltimore preacher, Webster attended Edmondson High School in the city. A four-year basketball letterman at Morgan State University, he earned the nickname "the Human Eraser" as a junior when he averaged eight blocked shots a game while helping the Bears capture the 1974 NCAA Division II Championship. He averaged 21 points and 22.4 rebounds and was named Division II player of the year.

Webster still holds eight career school records: 1,990 points, 2,267 rebounds, 19.5 rebounds per game, 785 field goals made, 424 free throws made, 644 free throws attempted, 722 blocks and 110 games started. His 740 rebounds in 1974 and 2,267 career total are still second all-time in NCAA history in their respective categories. He was named to the NCAA Division II Men's Basketball 50th Anniversary All-Elite Eight Team in 2006.

== Professional career ==
Webster was selected in the first round of both the NBA and ABA Drafts in 1975 (third overall by the Atlanta Hawks, first overall by the Denver Nuggets, respectively). After signing with the Nuggets, he was diagnosed with a form of hepatitis, and played only 38 games as a rookie in 1975–76.

A 7' 1" center, Webster helped the Nuggets reach the 1976 ABA Finals and win the 1976–77 NBA Midwest Division championship as a backup to Dan Issel. Before the 1977–78 season, the Nuggets traded Webster, Paul Silas, and Willie Wise to the Seattle SuperSonics for Tom Burleson, Bobby Wilkerson and a first-round draft pick. With Webster as the starting center, rookie Jack Sikma, Gus Williams, and Dennis Johnson, the SuperSonics won the 1977–78 NBA Western Conference championship and reached the 1978 NBA Finals. His finest season was his single year with Seattle, in which he averaged 14.0 points, 12.6 rebounds, and 2.0 blocks per game. He raised his performance in the SuperSonics’ 22-game playoff run that year, averaging 16.1 points, 13.1 rebounds, and more than 2.6 blocks per game. Webster still holds the SuperSonics' record for rebounds in one half with 21.

In 1978, the Knicks signed Webster as a free-agent. As compensation, the NBA awarded the SuperSonics the playing rights to power-forward Lonnie Shelton and the Knicks’ 1979 first-round draft pick. In his first season with the Knicks, Webster averaged 11.3 points per game and 10.9 rebounds per game. Webster never again reached double figures in either category in the NBA after that. Webster missed the 1984–85 and start of the 1985–86 season with hepatitis before retiring from the Knicks.

Webster played briefly in the Continental Basketball Association, and later with the Milwaukee Bucks during the 1986–87 season.

Webster was found dead in a Tulsa, Oklahoma, hotel room on April 4, 2009. He was 56 years old. It is believed that he died of a coronary artery disease.

== Career statistics ==
Legend
GP	Games played	GS	Games started	MPG	Minutes per game
FG%	Field goal percentage	3P%	3-point field goal percentage	FT%	Free throw percentage
RPG	Rebounds per game	APG	Assists per game	SPG	Steals per game
BPG	Blocks per game	PPG	Points per game	**Bold**	Career high
*	Led the league

=== College ===
Legend
GP	Games played	GS	Games started	MPG	Minutes per game
FG%	Field goal percentage	3P%	3-point field goal percentage	FT%	Free throw percentage
RPG	Rebounds per game	APG	Assists per game	SPG	Steals per game
BPG	Blocks per game	PPG	Points per game	**Bold**	Career high

Year	Team	GP	GS	MPG	FG%	3P%	FT%	RPG	APG	SPG	BPG	PPG
1971–72	Morgan State	26	–	–	.453	–	.687	16.1	–	–	–	13.2
1972–73	Morgan State	28	–	–	.514	–	.686	**23.2**	–	–	–	18.5
1973–74	Morgan State	**33**	–	–	.545	–	**.697**	22.4	–	–	–	**21.4**
1974–75	Morgan State	27	–	–	**.562**	–	.490	17.0	–	–	–	15.7
Career		114	–	–	.524	–	.658	19.9	–	–	–	17.5

=== ABA ===
==== Regular season ====
Year	Team	GP	GS	MPG	FG%	3P%	FT%	RPG	APG	SPG	BPG	PPG
1975–76	Denver	**38**	–	**10.5**	**.458**	.000	**.705**	**4.6**	**0.8**	**0.2**	**1.4**	**4.3**
Career		38	–	10.5	.458	.000	.705	4.6	0.8	0.2	1.4	4.3

==== Playoffs ====
Year	Team	GP	GS	MPG	FG%	3P%	FT%	RPG	APG	SPG	BPG	PPG
1975–76	Denver	**13***	–	**11.9**	**.420**	.000	**.536**	**5.5**	**0.7**	**0.1**	**1.1**	**4.4**
Career		13	–	11.9	.420	.000	.536	5.5	0.7	0.1	1.1	4.4

=== NBA ===
==== Regular season ====
Year	Team	GP	GS	MPG	FG%	3P%	FT%	RPG	APG	SPG	BPG	PPG
1976–77	Denver	80	–	16.0	.495	–	.650	6.1	0.8	0.3	1.5	6.7
1977–78	Seattle	**82**	–	**35.5**	.502	–	.629	**12.6**	2.5	**0.6**	**2.0**	**14.0**
1978–79	New York	60	–	33.8	.473	–	.573	10.9	**2.9**	0.4	1.9	11.3
1979–80	New York	20	–	14.9	.481	.000	**.750**	4.0	0.5	0.2	0.6	4.4
1980–81	New York	**82**	–	20.8	.466	.250	.638	5.7	0.9	0.3	1.2	5.2
1981–82	New York	**82**	**32**	23.0	.491	.000	.635	6.0	1.2	0.3	1.1	6.2
1982–83	New York	**82**	0	18.0	.508	.000	.589	5.4	0.6	0.4	1.6	5.4
1983–84	New York	76	5	17.0	.469	.000	.564	4.8	0.7	0.4	1.3	3.8
1986–87	Milwaukee	15	0	6.8	**.526**	**1.000**	**.750**	1.7	0.2	0.2	0.5	1.8
Career		579	37	22.4	.489	.333	.617	7.0	1.2	0.4	1.4	7.1

==== Playoffs ====
Year	Team	GP	GS	MPG	FG%	3P%	FT%	RPG	APG	SPG	BPG	PPG
1976–77	Denver	6	–	16.0	**.500**	–	.667	6.7	0.5	**0.3**	1.8	5.0
1977–78	Seattle	**22***	–	**41.1**	.489	–	**.675**	**13.1**	**2.6**	**0.3**	**2.6**	**16.1**
1980–81	New York	2	–	31.5	**.500**	.000	.000	5.0	0.5	0.0	0.5	6.0
1982–83	New York	6	–	19.2	.389	.000	.636	4.7	0.5	0.0	1.2	4.7
1983–84	New York	12	–	17.0	.483	.000	.600	4.7	0.3	**0.3**	1.4	3.1
Career		48	–	28.8	.485	.000	.647	8.8	1.4	0.3	2.0	9.6

== Personal life ==
Webster was married to Mederia Webster. Webster's son, Marvin Webster Jr., was recruited to play basketball at Temple University, but died at age 19 from a heart attack prior to his sophomore season.

Later in his life, Webster lived in Metuchen, New Jersey.

== Popular culture references ==
Webster is one of five 1970s Seattle SuperSonics players whose names are featured on characters in "The Exterminator," the third episode of Season 1 of iZombie. The other four are Freddie Brown, Gus Williams, Wally Walker and Don Watts.
