= Tom Henderson (basketball) =

American basketball player (born 1952)

Personal information
- Born: January 26, 1952 (age 74) Newberry, South Carolina, U.S.
- Listed height: 6 ft 3 in (1.91 m)
- Listed weight: 190 lb (86 kg)

Career information
- High school: DeWitt Clinton (Bronx, New York)
- College: San Jacinto (1970–1972); Hawaii (1972–1974)
- NBA draft: 1974: 1st round, 7th overall pick
- Drafted by: Atlanta Hawks
- Playing career: 1974–1983
- Position: Point guard
- Number: 14, 6

Career history
- 1974–1977: Atlanta Hawks
- 1977–1979: Washington Bullets
- 1979–1983: Houston Rockets

Career highlights
- NBA champion (1978); Third-team All-American – AP (1974)

Career NBA statistics
- Points: 6,088 (9.4 ppg)
- Rebounds: 1,494 (2.3 rpg)
- Assists: 3,136 (4.8 apg)
- Stats at NBA.com
- Stats at Basketball Reference
Medals
Men's basketball
Representing United States
Olympic Games
Silver medal – second place	1972 Munich	Team

Thomas Edward Henderson (born January 26, 1952) is an American former professional basketball player in the National Basketball Association (NBA). He was born in Newberry, South Carolina.

A tough-minded 6'4" point guard from the University of Hawaiʻi, Henderson was first selected by the San Antonio Spurs in the 1973 American Basketball Association undergraduate draft before being selected by the Atlanta Hawks in the first round of the 1974 NBA draft. He went on to have a productive nine-year (1974–1983) professional career in the NBA, playing for the Hawks, the Washington Bullets, and the Houston Rockets. Henderson accumulated 6,088 career points and 3,136 career assists, and he reached the NBA Finals three times, winning with the Bullets in 1978.

Since retiring from basketball, Henderson has worked as an administrator at a Houston-area juvenile facility.

While still an amateur as a college student, Henderson was on the United States basketball team at the 1972 Summer Olympics and was part of the controversial 1972 Olympic Men's Basketball Final.

The game ended, and we won. Then it ended again, and we won again.

— Tom Henderson

"They were going to keep going until they got the outcome they wanted: the Russians winning.

— Jim Forbes

Henderson and the rest of the team have never accepted the silver medal.

== Career statistics ==
Legend
GP	Games played	GS	Games started	MPG	Minutes per game
FG%	Field goal percentage	3P%	3-point field goal percentage	FT%	Free throw percentage
RPG	Rebounds per game	APG	Assists per game	SPG	Steals per game
BPG	Blocks per game	PPG	Points per game	**Bold**	Career high
†	Won an NBA championship	*	Led the league

=== NBA ===
==== Regular season ====
Year	Team	GP	GS	MPG	FG%	3P%	FT%	RPG	APG	SPG	BPG	PPG
1974–75	Atlanta	79		27.0	.411		.697	2.7	4.0	1.3	.1	11.4
1975–76	Atlanta	81		**35.8**	.413		.708	**3.3**	4.6	**1.7**	.1	**14.2**
1976–77	Atlanta	**46***		34.1	.433		.750	2.7	**8.4**	**1.7**	**.2**	11.3
1976–77	Washington	**41***		29.8	.469		.738	2.8	5.2	1.4	**.2**	11.1
1977–78†	Washington	75		30.9	.432		.746	2.6	5.4	1.2	**.2**	11.4
1978–79	Washington	70		29.7	.466		.800	2.3	6.0	1.2	.1	10.8
1979–80	Houston	66		23.5	**.477**	.000	.727	1.7	4.2	.8	.1	5.5
1980–81	Houston	66		21.4	.413	.000	**.821**	1.6	4.7	.8	.1	5.3
1981–82	Houston	75	**23**	22.9	.454	.000	.700	1.8	4.1	.7	.1	6.3
1982–83	Houston	51	2	15.5	.407	.000	.789	1.4	2.7	.7	.0	5.1
Career		650	25	27.2	.433	.000	.739	2.3	4.8	1.2	.1	9.4

==== Playoffs ====
Year	Team	GP	MPG	FG%	3P%	FT%	RPG	APG	SPG	BPG	PPG
1977	Washington	9	**35.8**	.444		.722	2.2	**7.0**	1.2	.2	**13.6**
1978†	Washington	**21**	28.4	.416		.734	2.2	5.0	**1.3**	.2	9.6
1979	Washington	19*	29.4	.366		.731	1.8	5.6	.9	.3	8.7
1980	Houston	7	29.0	**.478**	.000	.800	2.3	6.0	1.0	**.6**	8.0
1981	Houston	**21***	29.3	.447	.000	.821	2.6	5.0	.8	.0	6.7
1982	Houston	3	22.7	.313	–	**1.000**	**2.7**	3.0	.0	.0	4.0
Career		80	29.6	.415	.000	.752	2.3	5.4	1.0	.2	8.8
