= 1978 NBA Finals =

1978 basketball championship series

Team	Coach	Wins
Washington Bullets	Dick Motta	4
Seattle SuperSonics	Lenny Wilkens	3
- Dates: May 21 – June 7
- MVP: Wes Unseld (Washington Bullets)
- Hall of Famers: SuperSonics: Dennis Johnson (2010); Jack Sikma (2019); Bullets: Bob Dandridge (2021); Elvin Hayes (1990); Wes Unseld (1988); Coaches: Lenny Wilkens (1989, player/1998, coach); Officials: Darell Garretson (2016); Earl Strom (1995)
- Eastern finals: Bullets defeated 76ers, 4–2
- Western finals: SuperSonics defeated Nuggets, 4–2

The 1978 NBA World Championship Series was the championship round of the National Basketball Association (NBA)'s 1977–78 season, and the culmination of the season's playoffs. The series featured the Western Conference champion Seattle SuperSonics against the Eastern Conference champion Washington Bullets. The Bullets defeated the SuperSonics in seven games to win their first NBA championship. Bullets power forward/center Wes Unseld was named MVP of the series. The 1978 World Championship Series was the first NBA Finals series since the 1958 World Championship Series in which both teams had under 50 wins, and is the only NBA Finals to feature two teams with under 50 wins in an 82-game season. The 1978 Bullets were the last team to win Game 7 of the NBA Finals on the road until the Cleveland Cavaliers did so in 2016.

== Background ==
For much of the 1977–78 season, the Portland Trail Blazers were extremely likely to return and repeat as NBA champions. The team started with 50 wins in their first 60 games, but due to star center Bill Walton's foot injury, they only managed to go 8–14 the rest of the way. Walton and the Trail Blazers would not regain their form for the playoffs and ultimately were upset by their I-5 rivals, the Seattle SuperSonics.

=== Seattle SuperSonics ===
The Seattle SuperSonics had a disappointing start to the season, going 5–17 to begin with. Bob Hopkins, who replaced former Boston Celtics center Bill Russell as coach, was fired and Lenny Wilkens returned for a second tour of duty. The Sonics were led by rookie forward Jack Sikma, center Marvin Webster, forwards, Paul Silas and John Johnson, and guards Dennis Johnson and Gus Williams and Fred Brown. With Wilkens' experience being a key factor, the Sonics turned their season around, finishing with 47 wins and the fourth seed in the West. In the playoffs, they defeated the Los Angeles Lakers in a three-game miniseries, then defeated the top-seeded and defending champion Portland Trail Blazers (who lost center Bill Walton in the second game of the series) in six games, before a six-game win over the Denver Nuggets in the Conference finals sent them to their first of back-to-back NBA Finals appearances.

=== Washington Bullets ===
The Washington Bullets franchise made the Finals twice before in the 1970s, but were swept on both occasions, first by the Milwaukee Bucks in 1971 when they were still in Baltimore, and then by the Cinderella Golden State Warriors in 1975. The Bullets kept some of the personnel from that 1975 team, including All-Stars Wes Unseld and Elvin Hayes, but Dick Motta was now in his second year of coaching duty. The Bullets struggled with injuries during the season, but managed to finish with 44 wins, good for the third seed in the East. In the playoffs, the Bullets disposed the Atlanta Hawks in a two-game first round series, then ousted the San Antonio Spurs in six games, before making the finals again with a six-game win over the defending Eastern Conference champion Philadelphia 76ers.

From a KENS-TV Spurs broadcast in the San Antonio series after Washington took a 3–1 lead, Motta adopted the expression "The 'opera' isn't over 'til the fat lady sings" to warn Bullets fans against braggadocio. Motta also used an upbeat ostinato, "Wait for the fat lady!", to encourage the fans.

=== Road to the Finals ===
Seattle SuperSonics (Western Conference champion)		Washington Bullets (Eastern Conference champion)
# / Western Conference; # / Team / W / L / PCT / GB; 1 / z-Portland Trail Blazers / 58 / 24 / .707 / –; 2 / y-Denver Nuggets / 48 / 34 / .585 / 10; 3 / x-Phoenix Suns / 49 / 33 / .598 / 9; 4 / x-Seattle SuperSonics / 47 / 35 / .573 / 11; 5 / x-Los Angeles Lakers / 45 / 37 / .549 / 13; 6 / x-Milwaukee Bucks / 44 / 38 / .537 / 14; 7 / Golden State Warriors / 43 / 39 / .524 / 15; 8 / Chicago Bulls / 40 / 42 / .488 / 18; 9 / Detroit Pistons / 38 / 44 / .463 / 20; 10 / Indiana Pacers / 31 / 51 / .378 / 27; 11 / Kansas City Kings / 31 / 51 / .378 / 27; 4th seed in the West, 6th best league record	Regular season	# / Eastern Conference; # / Team / W / L / PCT / GB; 1 / z-Philadelphia 76ers / 55 / 27 / .671 / –; 2 / y-San Antonio Spurs / 52 / 30 / .634 / 3; 3 / x-Washington Bullets / 44 / 38 / .537 / 11; 4 / x-Cleveland Cavaliers / 43 / 39 / .524 / 12; 5 / x-New York Knicks / 43 / 39 / .524 / 12; 6 / x-Atlanta Hawks / 41 / 41 / .500 / 14; 7 / New Orleans Jazz / 39 / 43 / .476 / 16; 8 / Boston Celtics / 32 / 50 / .390 / 23; 9 / Houston Rockets / 28 / 54 / .341 / 27; 10 / Buffalo Braves / 27 / 55 / .329 / 28; 11 / New Jersey Nets / 24 / 58 / .293 / 31; 3rd seed in the East, 9th best league record
Defeated the (5) Los Angeles Lakers, 2–1	First round	Defeated the (6) Atlanta Hawks, 2–0
Defeated the (1) Portland Trail Blazers, 4–2	Conference semifinals	Defeated the (2) San Antonio Spurs, 4–2
Defeated the (2) Denver Nuggets, 4–2	Conference finals	Defeated the (1) Philadelphia 76ers, 4–2

=== Regular season series ===
Washington won the regular season series 3–1.

November 15, 1977

Seattle SuperSonics 109, Washington Bullets 111

Capital Centre, Landover, Maryland

December 18, 1977

Washington Bullets 109, Seattle SuperSonics 111

Seattle Center Coliseum, Seattle

February 8, 1978

Washington Bullets 106, Seattle SuperSonics 100

Seattle Center Coliseum, Seattle

March 14, 1978

Seattle SuperSonics 115, Washington Bullets 120

Capital Centre, Landover, Maryland

== Series summary ==
Game	Date	Home team	Result	Road team
Game 1	May 21	Seattle SuperSonics	106–102 (1–0)	Washington Bullets
Game 2	May 25	Washington Bullets	106–98 (1–1)	Seattle SuperSonics
Game 3	May 28	Washington Bullets	92–93 (1–2)	Seattle SuperSonics
Game 4	May 30	Seattle SuperSonics	116–120 (OT) (2–2)	Washington Bullets
Game 5	June 2	Seattle SuperSonics	98–94 (3–2)	Washington Bullets
Game 6	June 4	Washington Bullets	117–82 (3–3)	Seattle SuperSonics
Game 7	June 7	Seattle SuperSonics	99–105 (3–4)	Washington Bullets

Bullets win series 4–3

== Game summaries ==
=== Game 1 ===
CBS

May 21
12:00 p.m. PDT

Washington Bullets 102, Seattle SuperSonics 106
Scoring by quarter: 31–25, 27–24, 26–24, 18–33
Pts: Kevin Grevey 27; Rebs: Elvin Hayes 9 Asts: Tom Henderson 7	Pts: Fred Brown 30; Rebs: Marvin Webster 14; Asts: Dennis Johnson 5
Seattle leads the series, 1–0

Seattle Center Coliseum, Seattle, Washington
Attendance: 14,098
Referees:
- No. 10 Darell Garretson
- No. 17 Ed Rush

The Bullets, behind Kevin Grevey's 27 and Elvin Hayes's 21 points, held a 19-point lead in the fourth quarter at the Seattle Center Coliseum. But, the Sonics staged a comeback in front of the home crowd, led by "instant offense" guard Fred Brown. Brown scored 16 points in the last nine minutes to finish with 30 and give the SuperSonics the win.

=== Game 2 ===
CBS

May 25
9:00 p.m. EDT

Seattle SuperSonics 98, Washington Bullets 106
Scoring by quarter: 16–29, 36–27, 19–24, 27–26
Pts: Gus Williams 24; Rebs: Marvin Webster 12; Asts: Dennis Johnson, Silas, Williams 4 each	Pts: Bob Dandridge 34; Rebs: Wes Unseld 15; Asts: Henderson, Unseld 5 each
Series tied, 1–1

Capital Centre, Landover, Maryland
Attendance: 19,035
Referees:
- No. 7 Joe Gushue
- No. 11 Jake O'Donnell

In an unusual 1–2–2–1–1 scheduling format, the next two games were played at the Capital Centre, the Bullets' home floor. Wes Unseld defended inside on Marvin Webster and Jack Sikma, pulled down 15 rebounds, and handed out five assists. This work enabled Bob Dandridge to score 34 points and Elvin Hayes 25 as the Bullets evened the series, winning their first NBA Finals game following nine consecutive losses.

=== Game 3 ===
CBS

May 28
1:30 p.m. EDT

Seattle SuperSonics 93, Washington Bullets 92
Scoring by quarter: 24–24, 25–23, 20–20, 24–25
Pts: Webster, Williams 20 each Rebs: Paul Silas 14; Asts: Brown, Dennis Johnson, Sikma, Webster, Williams 2 each	Pts: Elvin Hayes 29; Rebs: Elvin Hayes 20; Asts: Bob Dandridge 6
Seattle leads the series, 2–1

Capital Centre, Landover, Maryland
Attendance: 19,035
Referees:
- No. 12 Earl Strom
- No. 9 John Vanak

Dennis Johnson was superb on defense, blocking seven shots and holding Kevin Grevey to 1-for-14 shooting. Paul Silas, the SuperSonics' veteran leader off the bench, helped shut down the Bullets' big men.

With 10 seconds remaining and the SuperSonics leading 93–90, Johnson's inbounds pass was stolen by Tom Henderson, who scored to make it 93–92 with five seconds left. Silas then stepped on the baseline trying to make the subsequent inbounds pass (even though replays showed he was clearly behind the baseline when he released the ball), turning the ball over to the Bullets. Bob Dandridge missed at the buzzer, however, and the SuperSonics picked up a victory on the road.

=== Game 4 ===
CBS

May 30
6:00 p.m. PDT

Washington Bullets 120, Seattle SuperSonics 116 (OT)
Scoring by quarter: 23–25, 25–31, 30–31, 28–19, Overtime: 14–10
Pts: Bob Dandridge 23; Rebs: Elvin Hayes 13; Asts: Tom Henderson 11	Pts: Dennis Johnson 33; Rebs: Marvin Webster 15; Asts: Paul Silas 6
Series tied, 2–2

Kingdome, Seattle, Washington
Attendance: 39,457
Referees:
- No. 14 Jack Madden
- No. 6 Don Murphy

Game 4 was held in the Seattle Kingdome because the Seattle Center Coliseum was tied up with a mobile-home show. As a result, the Bullets had to contend with a then-record playoff crowd of over 39,000 fans.

The SuperSonics led by 15 with two minutes left in the third quarter. At this point, the Bullet guards, who had been victimized all series by Gus Williams and emerging star Dennis Johnson, started to assert themselves, especially reserves Charles Johnson and Larry Wright.

At the start of the final period, Dennis Johnson was elbowed hard in the ribs and left the game for a short time. With Charles Johnson, Wright, Mitch Kupchak and Bob Dandridge in the lineup, the Bullets stormed back and took a 103–101 lead with about 3.5 minutes left in the game. Dennis Johnson then returned and went on a barrage, scoring first to tie the game, blocking a Dandridge shot, getting an offensive rebound, and pushing the Sonics to a 104–103 lead with a foul shot. Johnson would finish with 33 points, seven rebounds and three blocks.

Dandridge answered with a three-point play that returned the lead to Washington, 106–104. Seattle got the ball back and tied it with "instant offense" Fred Brown's jumper from "downtown". With two seconds left, Dandridge got a good shot in the lane, only to have Johnson block it, forcing overtime. But then, Charles Johnson became an instant hero by hitting three quick shots in overtime to give the Bullets a 120–116 win. The Bullets had tied the series at two wins apiece.

=== Game 5 ===
CBS

June 2
6:00 p.m. PDT

Washington Bullets 94, Seattle SuperSonics 98
Scoring by quarter: 24–23, 17–29, 26–24, 27–22
Pts: Kevin Grevey 22; Rebs: Wes Unseld 14; Asts: Tom Henderson 6	Pts: Fred Brown 26; Rebs: Marvin Webster 13; Asts: John Johnson 7
Seattle leads the series, 3–2

Seattle Center Coliseum, Seattle, Washington
Attendance: 14,098
Referees:
- No. 7 Joe Gushue
- No. 11 Jake O'Donnell

The SuperSonics returned to the Seattle Center Coliseum and eked out a close win. "Downtown" Freddie Brown had 26 points and Dennis Johnson 24 to carry Seattle to a 98–94 win and the series lead. The Bullets lost it at the line, making only 9 of 20 free throws in the second half. Even so, they cut Seattle's 11-point lead to two with less than two minutes to go before Jack Sikma hit three free throws down the stretch.

=== Game 6 ===
CBS

June 4
1:30 p.m. EDT

Seattle SuperSonics 82, Washington Bullets 117
Scoring by quarter: 21–19, 14–28, 26–37, 21–33
Pts: Fred Brown 17; Rebs: Marvin Webster 12; Asts: Gus Williams 6	Pts: Elvin Hayes 21; Rebs: Elvin Hayes 15; Asts: Greg Ballard 6
Series tied, 3–3

Capital Centre, Landover, Maryland
Attendance: 19,035
Referees:
- No. 10 Darell Garretson
- No. 6 Don Murphy

Game 6, in Washington, was all Bullets, 117–82. With the Washington backcourt continuing to struggle, Bullets coach Dick Motta inserted Greg Ballard at forward and moved Bob Dandridge to guard, a risky move considering Dandridge had played very little guard. Ballard and Dandridge produced a run that gave the Bullets a 12-point lead at the half. Washington scored 70 points in the second half, and the SuperSonics weren't up to that pace. Mitch Kupchak added 19 points, and Ballard had 12 points and 12 rebounds. The 35-point margin of victory was an NBA Finals record that stood until the 1998 NBA Finals Game 3 (Chicago defeated Utah 96–54, 42 points).

=== Game 7 ===
CBS

June 7
6:00 p.m. PDT

Washington Bullets 105, Seattle SuperSonics 99
Scoring by quarter: 31–28, 22–17, 26–21, 26–33
Pts: Dandridge, Charles Johnson 19 each Rebs: Wes Unseld 9 Asts: Wes Unseld 6	Pts: Marvin Webster 27; Rebs: Marvin Webster 19; Asts: Gus Williams 5
Washington wins the series 4–3

Seattle Center Coliseum, Seattle, Washington
Attendance: 14,098
Referees:
- No. 14 Jack Madden
- No. 12 Earl Strom

Dennis Johnson, who before the 1977–78 playoffs was a relatively unknown guard from Pepperdine University, had grown into a star in this series in front of a national TV audience. However, DJ would miss every one of his 14 shots in this game. Fellow guard Gus Williams was a bit more accurate, shooting 4-for-12. SuperSonics big men Marvin Webster scored 27 points and Jack Sikma 21 to take up the slack, and that kept it close.

With 90 seconds left, Seattle whittled the lead from 11 points down to four, but Mitch Kupchak came up with a three-point play. Fred Brown, who finished with 21 points off the bench, hit a short jumper, then Paul Silas got a tip-in to cut it to 101–99. Silas then fouled Wes Unseld, a 55-percent shooter from the line during the playoffs. He hit two free throws, and moments later Washington sealed it with a Bob Dandridge dunk, 105–99.

Charles Johnson and Dandridge each scored 19 points for the Bullets, while Elvin Hayes fouled out with 12 points, a development that brought a couple of needling questions from the writers about his past failures in the playoffs and Hayes' cheerful comeback "Whatever else they can say about me, they also got to say E's a world champion. E wears the ring." Unseld would be named Finals MVP.

After the climactic Game 7 victory, Motta celebrated with his team wearing a beer-soaked The Opera Isn't Over 'Til The Fat Lady Sings T-shirt. He said, "What made the championship so great was that we weren't supposed to win it. We came a long way. Most people didn't give us a chance, but I felt all along we could. I really did."

This was the last time the road team won Game 7 of the NBA Finals until the Cleveland Cavaliers did so in 2016.

== Player statistics ==
Legend
GP	Games played	GS	Games started	MPG	Minutes per game
FG%	Field-goal percentage	3P%	3-point field-goal percentage	FT%	Free-throw percentage
RPG	Rebounds per game	APG	Assists per game	SPG	Steals per game
BPG	Blocks per game	PPG	Points per game

Washington Bullets

Washington Wizards statistics
Player	GP	GS	MPG	FG%	3P%	FT%	RPG	APG	SPG	BPG	PPG

Seattle SuperSonics

Seattle SuperSonics statistics
Player	GP	GS	MPG	FG%	3P%	FT%	RPG	APG	SPG	BPG	PPG

== Broadcasting ==
=== Television coverage ===
Nationwide TV coverage of the 1978 NBA finals was broadcast by CBS Sports, with Brent Musburger (All Games) on play-by-play and Rick Barry (All Games), Steve Jones (Game 1), recently retired John Havlicek (Games 2, 4 and 7), Gus Johnson (Game 3) and Keith Erickson (Games 4 and 5) on color commentary. Locally, the 1978 NBA Finals was broadcast by CBS affiliates: WTOP-TV in Washington, D.C., and KIRO-TV in Seattle, Washington.

=== National coverage ===
Nationwide radio coverage of the 1978 NBA Finals was broadcast by Mutual, with Tony Roberts on play-by-play and Hubie Brown on color commentary.

=== Local market coverage ===
The flagship stations of each station of each team carried their local play-by-play calls. In Washington, D.C., WTOP-AM carried the series, with Frank Herzog on play-by-play. In Seattle, KOMO, carried the series with Bob Blackburn on play-by-play.

== Team rosters ==
=== Washington Bullets ===
1977–78 Washington Bullets roster
Players

Pos.	No.	Player	Height	Weight	DOB	From
F	42	Greg Ballard	6 ft 7 in (2.01 m)	215 lb (98 kg)		Oregon
G	45	Phil Chenier	6 ft 3 in (1.91 m)	180 lb (82 kg)		California
SF	10	Bob Dandridge	6 ft 6 in (1.98 m)	195 lb (88 kg)		Norfolk State
F	35	Kevin Grevey	6 ft 5 in (1.96 m)	210 lb (95 kg)		Kentucky
G	14	Tom Henderson	6 ft 3 in (1.91 m)	190 lb (86 kg)		Hawaiʻi
C	11	Elvin Hayes	6 ft 9 in (2.06 m)	235 lb (107 kg)		Houston
PF	25	Mitch Kupchak	6 ft 9 in (2.06 m)	230 lb (104 kg)		North Carolina
G	15	Charles Johnson	6 ft 0 in (1.83 m)	170 lb (77 kg)		California
C	44	Joe Pace	6 ft 10 in (2.08 m)	220 lb (100 kg)		Coppin State
F	41	Wes Unseld	6 ft 7 in (2.01 m)	245 lb (111 kg)		Louisville
G	32	Larry Wright	6 ft 1 in (1.85 m)	160 lb (73 kg)		Grambling State

Coaches
Head coach
- Dick Motta

Legend
- (DP) Unsigned draft pick
- (FA) Free agent
- (S) Suspended
- Injured

=== Seattle SuperSonics ===
1977–78 Seattle SuperSonics roster
Players

Pos.	No.	Player	Height	Weight	DOB	From
G	32	Fred Brown	6 ft 3 in (1.91 m)	182 lb (83 kg)	1948–08–07	Iowa
F	30	Al Fleming	6 ft 7 in (2.01 m)	215 lb (98 kg)	1954–04–05	Arizona
G	10	Joe Hassett	6 ft 5 in (1.96 m)	180 lb (82 kg)	1955–09–11	Providence
G	24	Dennis Johnson	6 ft 4 in (1.93 m)	185 lb (84 kg)	1954–09–18	Pepperdine
F	27	John Johnson	6 ft 7 in (2.01 m)	200 lb (91 kg)	1947–10–18	Iowa
F	45	Bruce Seals	6 ft 8 in (2.03 m)	210 lb (95 kg)	1953–06–18	Xavier (LA)
F/C	43	Jack Sikma	6 ft 11 in (2.11 m)	230 lb (104 kg)	1955–11–14	Illinois Wesleyan
F/C	35	Paul Silas	6 ft 7 in (2.01 m)	220 lb (100 kg)	1943–07–12	Creighton
F	42	Wally Walker	6 ft 7 in (2.01 m)	190 lb (86 kg)	1954–07–18	Virginia
C	40	Marvin Webster	7 ft 1 in (2.16 m)	225 lb (102 kg)	1952–04–13	Morgan State
G	1	Gus Williams	6 ft 2 in (1.88 m)	175 lb (79 kg)	1953–10–10	USC

Coaches
Head coach
- (United States) Lenny Wilkens (Providence)

Legend
- (DP) Unsigned draft pick
- (FA) Free agent
- (S) Suspended
- Injured

== Aftermath ==
Days after the Game 7 win (the first for a Washington D.C.–based team in 36 years), an estimated 100,000 fans lined an 11-mile parade route from Capital Centre in Landover, Maryland, to Washington, D.C. with the District Building, the White House, the Capitol and RFK Stadium.

The NBA received much criticism over the fact that the seven-game series was stretched out over 18 days, presumably for television. It was the longest playoff series (in total number of days) ever played in any sport until the 2016 NBA Finals (in which the road team won Game 7 for the first time since 1978), also lasted 18 days. The 2025 NBA Finals lasted 18 days as well, and ironically featured the Oklahoma City Thunder, known previously as the Seattle SuperSonics.

Both teams met again in the 1979 finals, which Seattle won four games to one.

== See also ==
- 1978 NBA playoffs
- 1977-78 NBA season
