= Bob Wilkerson =

American basketball player (born 1954)

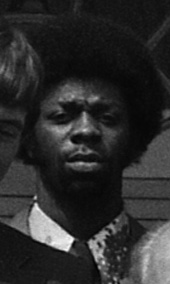
- Wilkerson in 1976

Personal information
- Born: August 15, 1954 (age 72) Anderson, Indiana, U.S.
- Listed height: 6 ft 6 in (1.98 m)
- Listed weight: 195 lb (88 kg)

Career information
- High school: Madison Heights (Anderson, Indiana)
- College: Indiana (1973–1976)
- NBA draft: 1976: 1st round, 11th overall pick
- Drafted by: Seattle SuperSonics
- Playing career: 1976–1983
- Position: Small forward / shooting guard
- Number: 33, 32

Career history

Playing
- 1976–1977: Seattle SuperSonics
- 1977–1980: Denver Nuggets
- 1980–1981: Chicago Bulls
- 1981–1983: Cleveland Cavaliers

Coaching
- 1986–1990: Colorado (assistant)
- 1990–1991: Maryland Eastern Shore (assistant)
- 1991–1992: Maryland Eastern Shore (interim HC)

Career highlights
- NCAA champion (1976)

Career NBA statistics
- Points: 5,424 (10.1 ppg)
- Rebounds: 2,236 (4.2 rpg)
- Assists: 1,835 (3.4 apg)
- Stats at NBA.com
- Stats at Basketball Reference

Robert Lee Wilkerson (born August 15, 1954) is an American former professional basketball player.

A 6'6" swingman born in Anderson, Indiana, Wilkerson attended Indiana University, where he was a member of the Hoosiers' 1976 NCAA Championship team. From 1976 to 1983 he played in the National Basketball Association as a member of the Seattle SuperSonics, Denver Nuggets, Chicago Bulls, and Cleveland Cavaliers. He averaged 10.1 points per game in his NBA career.

== Career playing statistics ==
Legend
GP	Games played	GS	Games started	MPG	Minutes per game
FG%	Field goal percentage	3P%	3-point field goal percentage	FT%	Free throw percentage
RPG	Rebounds per game	APG	Assists per game	SPG	Steals per game
BPG	Blocks per game	PPG	Points per game	**Bold**	Career high

=== NBA ===
==== Regular season ====
Year	Team	GP	GS	MPG	FG%	3P%	FT%	RPG	APG	SPG	BPG	PPG
1976–77	Seattle	78		19.9	.386		.689	3.3	2.2	.9	.1	6.7
1977–78	Denver	**81**		**34.3**	.408		.748	**5.9**	**5.4**	**1.6**	.3	11.4
1978–79	Denver	80		30.3	.456		.688	5.2	3.6	1.5	.3	11.4
1979–80	Denver	75		31.7	.417	**.206**	.748	4.2	3.2	1.2	**.4**	**13.8**
1980–81	Chicago	80		28.0	**.462**	.100	**.840**	3.5	3.4	1.3	.3	10.0
1981–82	Cleveland	65	**38**	27.8	.418	.167	.784	3.8	3.6	1.4	**.4**	11.0
1982–83	Cleveland	77	11	22.1	.417	.000	.750	3.1	2.5	.9	.2	6.7
Career		536	49	27.8	.425	.167	.751	4.2	3.4	1.3	.3	10.1

==== Playoffs ====
Year	Team	GP	MPG	FG%	3P%	FT%	RPG	APG	SPG	BPG	PPG
1978	Denver	**13**	32.8	.370		.619	5.5	**6.0**	**1.5**	**.3**	9.2
1979	Denver	3	**33.7**	.412		.333	**8.7**	5.0	1.0	**.3**	**9.7**
1981	Chicago	6	25.3	**.424**	.000	**1.000**	2.7	2.3	.8	.2	9.2
Career		22	30.9	.391	.000	.640	5.1	4.9	1.2	.3	9.3

== Head coaching record ==
Record table
Season	Team	Overall	Conference	Standing	Postseason
Maryland Eastern Shore Hawks (Mid-Eastern Athletic Conference) (1991–1992)
1991–92	Maryland Eastern Shore	3–25	2–14	9th	
Maryland Eastern Shore:		3–25 (.107)			
Total:		3–25 (.107)			
National champion Postseason invitational champion Conference regular season champion Conference regular season and conference tournament champion Division regular season champion Division regular season and conference tournament champion Conference tournament champion
