= 1978 NBA playoffs =

Postseason tournament

Tournament details
- Dates: April 11–June 7, 1978
- Season: 1977–78
- Teams: 12

Final positions
- Champions: Washington Bullets (1st title)
- Runners-up: Seattle SuperSonics
- Semifinalists: Denver Nuggets; Philadelphia 76ers

The 1978 NBA playoffs was the postseason tournament of the National Basketball Association's 1977-78 season. The tournament concluded with the Eastern Conference champion Washington Bullets defeating the Western Conference champion Seattle SuperSonics 4 games to 3 in the NBA Finals. Wes Unseld was named NBA Finals MVP. To date, it remains the only NBA title that the Bullets (since renamed the Wizards) have won.

It was the third NBA Finals appearance and first title for the Bullets, founded in 1961. The Sonics made the Finals for the first time in their 11-year existence. This would be the first of two straight meetings in the Finals between the Bullets and Sonics, with Seattle winning the title the next year.

This was the first time since the expansion of the playoff field to 10 teams in 1975 that neither conference champion had the benefit of a first-round bye by being one of the top two teams in the conference during the regular season. The 1979 Finals rematch between the Sonics and Bullets took place with both teams as the #1 seed in their respective conference.

The Denver Nuggets, one of the four former American Basketball Association teams to join the NBA the previous season, became the first of them to win an NBA playoff series, defeating the Milwaukee Bucks in a 7-game conference semifinal.

== Bracket ==
First Round
E4	Cleveland	0
E5	New York	2
E3	Washington	2
E6	Atlanta	0
W4	Seattle	2
W5	Los Angeles	1
W3	Phoenix	0
W6	Milwaukee	2

Conference Semifinals
E1	Philadelphia*	4
E5	New York	0
Eastern Conference
E3	Washington	4
E2	San Antonio*	2
W1	Portland*	2
W4	Seattle	4
Western Conference
W6	Milwaukee	3
W2	Denver*	4

Conference Finals
E1	Philadelphia*	2
E3	Washington	4
W4	Seattle	4
W2	Denver*	2

NBA Finals
E3	Washington	4
W4	Seattle	3

- * Division winner
- Bold Series winner
- Italic Team with home-court advantage

== First round ==
=== Eastern Conference first round ===
==== (3) Washington Bullets vs. (6) Atlanta Hawks ====
April 12

Boxscore

Atlanta Hawks 94, Washington Bullets 103
Scoring by quarter: 25–25, 23–31, 23–25, 23–22
Pts: John Drew 25; Rebs: Tom McMillen 14; Asts: Eddie Johnson 4	Pts: Bob Dandridge 20; Rebs: Wes Unseld 15; Asts: Wes Unseld 7
Washington leads series, 1–0

Capital Centre, Landover, Maryland
Attendance: 9,326

April 14

Boxscore

Washington Bullets 107, Atlanta Hawks 103 (OT)
Scoring by quarter: 25–26, 23–20, 30–24, 17–25, Overtime: 12–8
Pts: Kevin Grevey 41; Rebs: Wes Unseld 15; Asts: Tom Henderson 5	Pts: John Drew 27; Rebs: Drew, McMillen 8 each Asts: Hill, Hawes 5 each
Washington wins series, 2–0

Omni Coliseum, Atlanta, Georgia
Attendance: 15,601

This was the third playoff meeting between these two teams, with both teams split the first two meetings while both teams were in Baltimore and St. Louis respectively.

Previous playoff series
Tied 1–1 in all-time playoff series

1965

St. Louis Hawks 1, Baltimore Bullets 3

1965 Western Division Semifinals

1966

Baltimore Bullets 0, St. Louis Hawks 3

1966 Western Division Semifinals

==== (4) Cleveland Cavaliers vs. (5) New York Knicks ====
April 12

Boxscore

New York Knicks 132, Cleveland Cavaliers 114
Scoring by quarter: 32–31, 31–28, 36–31, 33–24
Pts: Bob McAdoo 41; Rebs: Spencer Haywood 8 Asts: Ray Williams 6	Pts: Campy Russell 23; Rebs: Elmore Smith 12; Asts: Foots Walker 6
New York leads series, 1–0

Richfield Coliseum, Richfield, Ohio
Attendance: 19,739

April 14

Boxscore

Cleveland Cavaliers 107, New York Knicks 109
Scoring by quarter: 29–26, 27–20, 25–31, 26–32
Pts: Campy Russell 32; Rebs: Campy Russell 8 Asts: Campy Russell 6	Pts: McAdoo, Haywood 27 each Rebs: Bob McAdoo 12; Asts: Ray Williams 10
New York wins series, 2–0

Madison Square Garden, New York City, New York
Attendance: 18,965

This was the first playoff meeting between these two teams.

=== Western Conference first round ===
==== (3) Phoenix Suns vs. (6) Milwaukee Bucks ====
April 11

Boxscore

Milwaukee Bucks 111, Phoenix Suns 103
Scoring by quarter: 24–31, 26–24, 29–28, 32–20
Pts: Brian Winters 31; Rebs: Marques Johnson 16; Asts: Quinn Buckner 8	Pts: Walter Davis 31; Rebs: Alvan Adams 9 Asts: Paul Westphal 9
Milwaukee leads series, 1–0

Arizona Veterans Memorial Coliseum, Phoenix, Arizona
Attendance: 12,161

April 14

Boxscore

Phoenix Suns 90, Milwaukee Bucks 94
Scoring by quarter: 36–25, 16–24, 17–22, 21–23
Pts: Paul Westphal 32; Rebs: Walter Davis 9 Asts: Paul Westphal 10	Pts: Marques Johnson 33; Rebs: Dave Meyers 14; Asts: Quinn Buckner 10
Milwaukee wins series, 2–0

MECCA Arena, Milwaukee, Wisconsin
Attendance: 10,938

This was the first playoff meeting between these two teams.

==== (4) Seattle SuperSonics vs. (5) Los Angeles Lakers ====
April 12

Boxscore

Los Angeles Lakers 90, Seattle SuperSonics 102
Scoring by quarter: 23–22, 24–25, 21–24, 22–31
Pts: Kareem Abdul-Jabbar 26; Rebs: Kareem Abdul-Jabbar 12; Asts: Nixon, Scott 6 each	Pts: Gus Williams 23; Rebs: Marvin Webster 14; Asts: Fred Brown 5
Seattle leads series, 1–0

Seattle Center Coliseum, Seattle, Washington
Attendance: 14,098

April 14

Boxscore

Seattle SuperSonics 99, Los Angeles Lakers 105
Scoring by quarter: 26–23, 27–26, 21–26, 25–30
Pts: Dennis Johnson 21; Rebs: Marvin Webster 10; Asts: Sikma, Williams 4 each	Pts: Kareem Abdul-Jabbar 24; Rebs: Kareem Abdul-Jabbar 18; Asts: Adrian Dantley 6
Series tied, 1–1

The Forum, Inglewood, California
Attendance: 15,051

April 16

Boxscore

Los Angeles Lakers 102, Seattle SuperSonics 111
Scoring by quarter: 24–26, 26–33, 28–32, 24–20
Pts: Kareem Abdul-Jabbar 31; Rebs: Kareem Abdul-Jabbar 11; Asts: Norm Nixon 5	Pts: Jack Sikma 24; Rebs: Marvin Webster 18; Asts: Gus Williams 8
Seattle wins series, 2–1

Seattle Center Coliseum, Seattle, Washington
Attendance: 14,098

This was the first playoff meeting between these two teams.

== Conference semifinals ==
=== Eastern Conference semifinals ===
==== (1) Philadelphia 76ers vs. (5) New York Knicks ====
April 16

Boxscore

New York Knicks 90, Philadelphia 76ers 130
Scoring by quarter: 20–28, 26–33, 22–28, 22–41
Pts: Ray Williams 24; Rebs: Bob McAdoo 13; Asts: Bob McAdoo 6	Pts: Steve Mix 19; Rebs: Caldwell Jones 16; Asts: Steve Mix 7
Philadelphia leads series, 1–0

Spectrum, Philadelphia, Pennsylvania
Attendance: 13,011

April 18

Boxscore

New York Knicks 100, Philadelphia 76ers 119
Scoring by quarter: 28–26, 24–36, 18–26, 30–31
Pts: Ray Williams 24; Rebs: three players 6 each Asts: Bob McAdoo 6	Pts: Julius Erving 22; Rebs: Caldwell Jones 11; Asts: Darryl Dawkins 6
Philadelphia leads series, 2–0

Spectrum, Philadelphia, Pennsylvania
Attendance: 15,853

April 20

Boxscore

Philadelphia 76ers 137, New York Knicks 126
Scoring by quarter: 37–30, 35–35, 31–28, 34–33
Pts: McGinnis, Free 29 each Rebs: Julius Erving 10; Asts: Collins, Erving 7 each	Pts: Bob McAdoo 29; Rebs: Lonnie Shelton 14; Asts: Butch Beard 8
Philadelphia leads series, 3–0

Madison Square Garden, New York City, New York
Attendance: 18,697

April 23

Boxscore

Philadelphia 76ers 112, New York Knicks 107
Scoring by quarter: 25–30, 32–29, 26–24, 29–24
Pts: Doug Collins 24; Rebs: Caldwell Jones 14; Asts: Collins, Erving 4 each	Pts: Bob McAdoo 24; Rebs: Bob McAdoo 14; Asts: McAdoo, Williams 4 each
Philadelphia wins series, 4–0

Madison Square Garden, New York City, New York
Attendance: 16,307

This was the seventh playoff meeting between these two teams, with the 76ers winning four of the first six meetings.

Previous playoff series
Philadelphia leads 4–2 in all-time playoff series

1950

New York Knicks 1, Syracuse Nationals 2

1950 Eastern Division Finals

1951

New York Knicks 3, Syracuse Nationals 2

1951 Eastern Division Finals

1952

New York Knicks 3, Syracuse Nationals 1

1952 Eastern Division Finals

1954

New York Knicks 0, Syracuse Nationals 2

1954 Eastern Division Round Robin semifinals

1959

New York Knicks 0, Syracuse Nationals 2

1959 Eastern Division Semifinals

1968

New York Knicks 2, Philadelphia 76ers 4

1968 Eastern Division Semifinals

==== (2) San Antonio Spurs vs. (3) Washington Bullets ====
April 16

Boxscore

Washington Bullets 103, San Antonio Spurs 114
Scoring by quarter: 29–25, 20–23, 27–34, 27–32
Pts: Elvin Hayes 26; Rebs: Elvin Hayes 15; Asts: Elvin Hayes 6	Pts: George Gervin 35; Rebs: Larry Kenon 9 Asts: Gervin, Kenon 5 each
San Antonio leads series, 1–0

HemisFair Arena, San Antonio, Texas
Attendance: 9,669
Referees: Don Murphy, John Vanak

April 18

Boxscore

Washington Bullets 121, San Antonio Spurs 117
Scoring by quarter: 33–27, 32–28, 35–28, 21–34
Pts: Kevin Grevey 31; Rebs: Wes Unseld 13; Asts: Larry Wright 8	Pts: George Gervin 46; Rebs: Larry Kenon 8 Asts: Larry Kenon 6
Series tied, 1–1

HemisFair Arena, San Antonio, Texas
Attendance: 9,871
Referees: Bob Rakel, Earl Strom

April 21

Boxscore

San Antonio Spurs 105, Washington Bullets 118
Scoring by quarter: 26–38, 24–25, 24–30, 31–25
Pts: George Gervin 33; Rebs: Larry Kenon 9 Asts: Larry Kenon 4	Pts: Bob Dandridge 28; Rebs: Elvin Hayes 12; Asts: Wes Unseld 8
Washington leads series, 2–1

Capital Centre, Landover, Maryland
Attendance: 17,417
Referees: Darell Garretson, Joe Gushue

April 23

Boxscore

San Antonio Spurs 95, Washington Bullets 98
Scoring by quarter: 24–18, 23–25, 24–27, 24–28
Pts: George Gervin 35; Rebs: Billy Paultz 8 Asts: Mike Gale 7	Pts: Bob Dandridge 24; Rebs: Elvin Hayes 13; Asts: Bob Dandridge 8
Washington leads series, 3–1

Capital Centre, Landover, Maryland
Attendance: 13,459
Referees: Ed Middleton, Jake O'Donnell

April 25

Boxscore

Washington Bullets 105, San Antonio Spurs 116
Scoring by quarter: 27–33, 28–24, 19–26, 31–33
Pts: Charles Johnson 21; Rebs: Elvin Hayes 13; Asts: Wes Unseld 6	Pts: George Gervin 27; Rebs: Larry Kenon 14; Asts: Louie Dampier 6
Washington leads series, 3–2

HemisFair Arena, San Antonio, Texas
Attendance: 9,709
Referees: Jack Madden, John Vanak

April 28

Boxscore

San Antonio Spurs 100, Washington Bullets 103
Scoring by quarter: 29–25, 23–33, 22–19, 26–26
Pts: Mark Olberding 24; Rebs: Green, Paultz 9 each Asts: Mike Gale 9	Pts: Elvin Hayes 25; Rebs: Wes Unseld 16; Asts: Wes Unseld 5
Washington wins series, 4–2

Capital Centre, Landover, Maryland
Attendance: 19,035
Referees: Paul Mihalak, Richie Powers

This was the first playoff meeting between these two teams.

=== Western Conference semifinals ===
==== (1) Portland Trail Blazers vs. (4) Seattle SuperSonics ====
April 18

Boxscore

Seattle SuperSonics 104, Portland Trail Blazers 95
Scoring by quarter: 23–34, 23–19, 33–22, 25–20
Pts: Marvin Webster 24; Rebs: Jack Sikma 11; Asts: Dennis Johnson 4	Pts: Johnny Davis 20; Rebs: Bill Walton 16; Asts: Lionel Hollins 9
Seattle leads series, 1–0

Memorial Coliseum, Portland, Oregon
Attendance: 12,666

April 21

Boxscore

Seattle SuperSonics 93, Portland Trail Blazers 96
Scoring by quarter: 30–20, 19–20, 22–30, 22–26
Pts: Gus Williams 31; Rebs: Marvin Webster 15; Asts: Marvin Webster 7	Pts: Maurice Lucas 19; Rebs: Maurice Lucas 14; Asts: Lionel Hollins 5
Series tied, 1–1

Memorial Coliseum, Portland, Oregon
Attendance: 12,666

This was Bill Walton's final game in a Portland Trail Blazer uniform as X-rays done after the game showed that his navicular bone below Walton's left ankle was broken.

April 23

Boxscore

Portland Trail Blazers 84, Seattle SuperSonics 99
Scoring by quarter: 25–20, 18–24, 19–27, 22–28
Pts: Tom Owens 24; Rebs: Owens, Lucas 9 each Asts: Dave Twardzik 5	Pts: J. Johnson, Brown 18 each Rebs: Marvin Webster 23; Asts: Fred Brown 4
Seattle leads series, 2–1

Seattle Center Coliseum, Seattle, Washington
Attendance: 14,098

April 26

Boxscore

Portland Trail Blazers 98, Seattle SuperSonics 100
Scoring by quarter: 28–28, 29–17, 24–28, 17–27
Pts: Lionel Hollins 35; Rebs: Maurice Lucas 16; Asts: Tom Owens 8	Pts: Jack Sikma 28; Rebs: Jack Sikma 10; Asts: Dennis Johnson 8
Seattle leads series, 3–1

Seattle Center Coliseum, Seattle, Washington
Attendance: 14,098

April 30

Boxscore

Seattle SuperSonics 89, Portland Trail Blazers 113
Scoring by quarter: 13–25, 21–27, 23–27, 32–34
Pts: Marvin Webster 16; Rebs: Paul Silas 10; Asts: Gus Williams 4	Pts: Tom Owens 31; Rebs: Maurice Lucas 13; Asts: Davis, Owens 6 each
Seattle leads series, 3–2

Memorial Coliseum, Portland, Oregon
Attendance: 12,666

May 1

Boxscore

Portland Trail Blazers 94, Seattle SuperSonics 105
Scoring by quarter: 22–26, 27–29, 20–20, 25–30
Pts: Johnny Davis 23; Rebs: Maurice Lucas 12; Asts: Lionel Hollins 9	Pts: Dennis Johnson 20; Rebs: Marvin Webster 11; Asts: Gus Williams 7
Seattle wins series, 4–2

Seattle Center Coliseum, Seattle, Washington
Attendance: 14,098

This was the first playoff meeting between these two teams.

==== (2) Denver Nuggets vs. (6) Milwaukee Bucks ====
April 18

Boxscore

Milwaukee Bucks 103, Denver Nuggets 119
Scoring by quarter: 28–34, 34–29, 20–28, 21–28
Pts: Alex English 26; Rebs: Dave Meyers 15; Asts: Brian Winters 11	Pts: David Thompson 27; Rebs: Dan Issel 12; Asts: David Thompson 6
Denver leads series, 1–0

McNichols Sports Arena, Denver, Colorado
Attendance: 17,297

April 21

Boxscore

Milwaukee Bucks 111, Denver Nuggets 127
Scoring by quarter: 35–32, 18–31, 23–39, 35–25
Pts: Marques Johnson 22; Rebs: Johnson, Meyers 5 each Asts: Lloyd Walton 8	Pts: Dan Issel 22; Rebs: Dan Issel 14; Asts: Issel, Calvin 6 each
Denver leads series, 2–0

McNichols Sports Arena, Denver, Colorado
Attendance: 17,838

April 23

Boxscore

Denver Nuggets 112, Milwaukee Bucks 143
Scoring by quarter: 22–26, 28–30, 26–40, 36–47
Pts: three players 16 each Rebs: Anthony Roberts 8 Asts: David Thompson 5	Pts: Marques Johnson 35; Rebs: Marques Johnson 10; Asts: Lloyd Walton 11
Denver leads series, 2–1

MECCA Arena, Milwaukee, Wisconsin
Attendance: 10,938

April 25

Boxscore

Denver Nuggets 118, Milwaukee Bucks 104
Scoring by quarter: 27–22, 30–17, 33–22, 28–43
Pts: David Thompson 34; Rebs: Dan Issel 14; Asts: Wilkerson, Simpson 5 each	Pts: Johnson, Winters 14 each Rebs: Marques Johnson 7 Asts: Brian Winters 6
Denver leads series, 3–1

MECCA Arena, Milwaukee, Wisconsin
Attendance: 10,938

April 28

Boxscore

Milwaukee Bucks 117, Denver Nuggets 112
Scoring by quarter: 31–28, 19–26, 28–32, 39–26
Pts: Marques Johnson 34; Rebs: Marques Johnson 17; Asts: Winters, Buckner 9 each	Pts: Bobby Jones 25; Rebs: Dan Issel 15; Asts: Bob Wilkerson 8
Denver leads series, 3–2

McNichols Sports Arena, Denver, Colorado
Attendance: 17,838

April 30

Boxscore

Denver Nuggets 91, Milwaukee Bucks 119
Scoring by quarter: 26–33, 21–29, 20–30, 24–27
Pts: David Thompson 28; Rebs: Bobby Jones 10; Asts: Bob Wilkerson 6	Pts: Alex English 21; Rebs: Marques Johnson 17; Asts: Marques Johnson 9
Series tied, 3–3

MECCA Arena, Milwaukee, Wisconsin
Attendance: 10,938

May 3

Boxscore

Milwaukee Bucks 110, Denver Nuggets 116
Scoring by quarter: 26–34, 30–32, 25–29, 29–21
Pts: Brian Winters 27; Rebs: Marques Johnson 16; Asts: Quinn Buckner 10	Pts: David Thompson 37; Rebs: Bob Wilkerson 12; Asts: David Thompson 6
Denver wins series, 4–3

McNichols Sports Arena, Denver, Colorado
Attendance: 17,838

This was the first playoff meeting between these two teams.

== Conference finals ==
=== Eastern Conference finals ===
==== (1) Philadelphia 76ers vs. (3) Washington Bullets ====
April 30

Boxscore

Washington Bullets 122, Philadelphia 76ers 117 (OT)
Scoring by quarter: 26–19, 21–28, 30–34, 32–28, Overtime: 13–8
Pts: Elvin Hayes 28; Rebs: Elvin Hayes 18; Asts: Tom Henderson 9	Pts: Julius Erving 25; Rebs: George McGinnis 15; Asts: three players 5 each
Washington leads series, 1–0

Spectrum, Philadelphia, Pennsylvania
Attendance: 13,708
Referees: High Evans, Earl Strom

- After a jump ball with three seconds left, Doug Collins hits the game-tying shot at the buzzer to send it to OT.
- Wes Unseld is injured and misses the next three games of the series.

May 3

Boxscore

Washington Bullets 104, Philadelphia 76ers 110
Scoring by quarter: 26–28, 28–24, 22–32, 28–26
Pts: Elvin Hayes 26; Rebs: Elvin Hayes 15; Asts: Wright, Henderson 8 each	Pts: Doug Collins 28; Rebs: Erving, Dawkins 11 each Asts: Henry Bibby 9
Series tied, 1–1

Spectrum, Philadelphia, Pennsylvania
Attendance: 18,276
Referees: Jack Madden, John Vanak

May 5

Boxscore

Philadelphia 76ers 108, Washington Bullets 123
Scoring by quarter: 26–28, 19–34, 36–30, 27–31
Pts: George McGinnis 16; Rebs: Julius Erving 10; Asts: Henry Bibby 5	Pts: Bob Dandridge 30; Rebs: Elvin Hayes 12; Asts: Bob Dandridge 7
Washington leads series, 2–1

Capital Centre, Landover, Maryland
Attendance: 19,035
Referees: Joe Gushue, Paul Mihalak

May 7

Boxscore

Philadelphia 76ers 105, Washington Bullets 121
Scoring by quarter: 28–23, 20–31, 26–27, 31–40
Pts: Julius Erving 24; Rebs: Caldwell Jones 13; Asts: World B. Free 6	Pts: Elvin Hayes 35; Rebs: Elvin Hayes 19; Asts: four players 6 each
Washington leads series, 3–1

Capital Centre, Landover, Maryland
Attendance: 19,035
Referees: Jim Capers, Jake O'Donnell

- Wes Unseld returns to the lineup.

May 10

Boxscore

Washington Bullets 94, Philadelphia 76ers 107
Scoring by quarter: 12–23, 29–29, 21–30, 32–25
Pts: Larry Wright 18; Rebs: Hayes, Unseld 16 each Asts: Wes Unseld 5	Pts: Collins, Erving 24 each Rebs: Caldwell Jones 15; Asts: Henry Bibby 10
Washington leads series, 3–2

Spectrum, Philadelphia, Pennsylvania
Attendance: 18,276
Referees: Darell Garretson, Don Murphy

May 12

Boxscore

Philadelphia 76ers 99, Washington Bullets 101
Scoring by quarter: 27–24, 23–27, 26–33, 23–17
Pts: Doug Collins 33; Rebs: Erving, McGinnis 8 each Asts: Henry Bibby 5	Pts: Bob Dandridge 28; Rebs: Wes Unseld 15; Asts: Tom Henderson 6
Washington wins series, 4–2

Capital Centre, Landover, Maryland
Attendance: 19,035
Referees: Earl Strom, John Vanak

This was the second playoff meeting between these two teams, with the Bullets winning the first meeting while in Baltimore.

Previous playoff series
Baltimore/Washington leads 1–0 in all-time playoff series

1971

Philadelphia 76ers 3, Baltimore Bullets 4

1971 Eastern Conference Semifinals

=== Western Conference finals ===
==== (2) Denver Nuggets vs. (4) Seattle SuperSonics ====
May 5

Boxscore

Seattle SuperSonics 107, Denver Nuggets 116
Scoring by quarter: 27–30, 23–27, 27–23, 30–36
Pts: Marvin Webster 28; Rebs: Marvin Webster 16; Asts: Gus Williams 8	Pts: Dan Issel 25; Rebs: Issel, Hillman 11 each Asts: Bob Wilkerson 10
Denver leads series, 1–0

McNichols Sports Arena, Denver, Colorado
Attendance: 17,387

May 7

Boxscore

Seattle SuperSonics 121, Denver Nuggets 111
Scoring by quarter: 30–38, 31–18, 22–25, 38–30
Pts: Fred Brown 26; Rebs: Paul Silas 12; Asts: Fred Brown 6	Pts: Dan Issel 29; Rebs: Dan Issel 14; Asts: Ralph Simpson 7
Series tied, 1–1

McNichols Sports Arena, Denver, Colorado
Attendance: 17,838

May 10

Boxscore

Denver Nuggets 91, Seattle SuperSonics 105
Scoring by quarter: 30–30, 20–31, 24–16, 17–28
Pts: David Thompson 21; Rebs: Anthony Roberts 8 Asts: Jones, Webster 3 each	Pts: John Johnson 20; Rebs: Marvin Webster 16; Asts: D. Johnson, Webster 3 each
Seattle leads series, 2–1

Seattle Center Coliseum, Seattle, Washington
Attendance: 14,098

May 12

Boxscore

Denver Nuggets 94, Seattle SuperSonics 100
Scoring by quarter: 27–33, 31–17, 18–23, 18–27
Pts: Dan Issel 27; Rebs: Darnell Hillman 11; Asts: Bob Wilkerson 8	Pts: Dennis Johnson 31; Rebs: Paul Silas 14; Asts: John Johnson 7
Seattle leads series, 3–1

Seattle Center Coliseum, Seattle, Washington
Attendance: 14,098

May 14

Boxscore

Seattle SuperSonics 114, Denver Nuggets 123
Scoring by quarter: 24–35, 20–26, 39–27, 31–35
Pts: Gus Williams 31; Rebs: Marvin Webster 12; Asts: Williams, J. Johnson 6 each	Pts: David Thompson 35; Rebs: Bobby Jones 11; Asts: Bob Wilkerson 10
Seattle leads series, 3–2

McNichols Sports Arena, Denver, Colorado
Attendance: 17,006

May 17

Boxscore

Denver Nuggets 108, Seattle SuperSonics 123
Scoring by quarter: 26–39, 28–23, 18–31, 36–30
Pts: David Thompson 21; Rebs: Anthony Roberts 16; Asts: Bob Wilkerson 8	Pts: Fred Brown 26; Rebs: Paul Silas 13; Asts: Dennis Johnson 7
Seattle wins series, 4–2

Seattle Center Coliseum, Seattle, Washington
Attendance: 14,098

This was the first playoff meeting between these two teams.

== NBA Finals: (W4) Seattle SuperSonics vs. (E3) Washington Bullets ==
May 21

Boxscore

Washington Bullets 102, Seattle SuperSonics 106
Scoring by quarter: 31–25, 27–24, 26–24, 18–33
Pts: Kevin Grevey 27; Rebs: Elvin Hayes 9 Asts: Tom Henderson 7	Pts: Fred Brown 30; Rebs: Marvin Webster 14; Asts: Dennis Johnson 5
Seattle leads series, 1–0

Seattle Center Coliseum, Seattle, Washington
Attendance: 14,098
Referees: Darell Garretson, Ed Rush

- "Downtown" Freddie Brown scores 16 of his points in the 4th quarter to lead the Sonics back from a 19-point deficit.

May 25

Boxscore

Seattle SuperSonics 98, Washington Bullets 106
Scoring by quarter: 16–29, 36–27, 19–24, 27–26
Pts: Gus Williams 24; Rebs: Marvin Webster 12; Asts: three players 4 each	Pts: Bob Dandridge 34; Rebs: Wes Unseld 15; Asts: Henderson, Unseld 5 each
Series tied, 1–1

Capital Centre, Landover, Maryland
Attendance: 19,035
Referees: Joe Gushue, Jake O'Donnell

May 28

Boxscore

Seattle SuperSonics 93, Washington Bullets 92
Scoring by quarter: 24–24, 25–23, 20–20, 24–25
Pts: Webster, Williams 20 each Rebs: Paul Silas 14; Asts: five players 2 each	Pts: Elvin Hayes 29; Rebs: Elvin Hayes 20; Asts: Bob Dandridge 6
Seattle leads series, 2–1

Capital Centre, Landover, Maryland
Attendance: 19,035
Referees: Earl Strom, John Vanak

May 30

Boxscore

Washington Bullets 120, Seattle SuperSonics 116 (OT)
Scoring by quarter: 23–25, 25–31, 30–31, 28–19, Overtime: 14–10
Pts: Bob Dandridge 23; Rebs: Elvin Hayes 13; Asts: Tom Henderson 11	Pts: Dennis Johnson 33; Rebs: Marvin Webster 15; Asts: Paul Silas 6
Series tied, 2–2

Kingdome, Seattle, Washington
Attendance: 39,457
Referees: Jack Madden, Don Murphy

June 2

Boxscore

Washington Bullets 94, Seattle SuperSonics 98
Scoring by quarter: 24–23, 17–29, 26–24, 27–22
Pts: Kevin Grevey 22; Rebs: Bob Dandridge 10; Asts: Tom Henderson 6	Pts: Fred Brown 26; Rebs: Marvin Webster 13; Asts: John Johnson 7
Seattle leads series, 3–2

Seattle Center Coliseum, Seattle, Washington
Attendance: 14,098
Referees: Joe Gushue, Jake O'Donnell

June 4

Boxscore

Seattle SuperSonics 82, Washington Bullets 117
Scoring by quarter: 21–19, 14–28, 26–37, 21–33
Pts: Fred Brown 17; Rebs: Marvin Webster 12; Asts: Gus Williams 6	Pts: Elvin Hayes 21; Rebs: Elvin Hayes 15; Asts: Greg Ballard 6
Series tied, 3–3

Capital Centre, Landover, Maryland
Attendance: 19,035
Referees: Darell Garretson, Don Murphy

June 7

Boxscore

Washington Bullets 105, Seattle SuperSonics 99
Scoring by quarter: 31–28, 22–17, 26–21, 26–33
Pts: Dandridge, C. Johnson 19 each Rebs: Wes Unseld 9 Asts: Wes Unseld 6	Pts: Marvin Webster 27; Rebs: Marvin Webster 19; Asts: Gus Williams 5
Washington wins series, 4–3

Seattle Center Coliseum, Seattle, Washington
Attendance: 14,098
Referees: Jack Madden, Earl Strom

- This was the last time until 2016 that a road team defeated the home team in Game 7 of the Finals.

This was the first playoff meeting between these two teams.
