= Bob Blackburn (announcer) =

Bob Blackburn (October 14, 1924 – January 8, 2010) was the original play-by-play voice of the Seattle SuperSonics of the National Basketball Association. He called games for the team on KOMO radio and KOMO-TV, and later on KJR radio. His tenure with the SuperSonics included the team's first season in 1967–68 and its NBA Championship run in 1979, when the SuperSonics beat the Washington Bullets four games to one in a best-of-seven series.

== Early years ==
Blackburn grew up in the Los Angeles area. As a child, he was bedridden with tuberculosis. While listening to college sports broadcasts, he dreamed of being behind the microphone. Blackburn's uncle had told him his strength was in his "loud voice," so a career in broadcasting seemed like a good idea.

Blackburn managed to land a job at a radio station in Santa Ana, California in 1942, and worked his way up. He also attended college at Fresno State Normal School. Eventually, he landed a job with the Portland Beavers Pacific Coast League baseball team and was part of the Beavers' broadcast duo with Rollie Truitt on station KWJJ for 18 years. During that time, Blackburn was also a play-by-play announcer for University of Oregon and Oregon State University (OSU) football games in Portland, over the Tidewater Oil Company's sports radio network. In 1953, he became the sports director of KEX, a station where he also had his own afternoon disc jockey show. In 1957 he moved to KPOJ also doing the afternoon shift. In 1958 he moved to KXL, and then back to KPOJ in 1959.

When OSU created its own sports radio network in the late 1950s, Blackburn became the radio voice of Oregon State football and basketball. He was employed by the network flagship station, KEX of Portland. In 2002, Blackburn was inducted into the Oregon Sports Hall of Fame for his Special Contribution to Sports in Oregon.

== Seattle SuperSonics ==
When the SuperSonics joined the NBA in 1967–68, the team needed a play-by-play voice. Blackburn applied, along with 110 other applicants, and got the job. Blackburn called most SuperSonics games solo during his first 20 years behind the microphone. During the 1987–88 season, KJR added Kevin Calabro to the broadcast team and the duo shared play-by-play responsibilities. In 1992, Blackburn left in what he described as a "forced retirement." At that time, Calabro became the sole play-by-play voice and the team's second solo play-by-play broadcaster.

== Legacy ==
During his nearly 60 years on the air, Blackburn called over 7,000 sports events and 2,359 NBA games; the vast majority with the Seattle SuperSonics. As a broadcaster, Blackburn received comparable honors for his contributions to the SuperSonics over 25 years and, since he didn't actually have a "number" to be retired, the SuperSonics retired his microphone.

He resided in Issaquah, Washington until his death on January 8, 2010.
