= Toby Knight =

American basketball player (born 1955)

Personal information
- Born: May 3, 1955 (age 71) The Bronx, New York, U.S.
- Listed height: 6 ft 9 in (2.06 m)
- Listed weight: 210 lb (95 kg)

Career information
- High school: Port Jefferson (Port Jefferson, New York)
- College: Notre Dame (1973–1977)
- NBA draft: 1977: 2nd round, 32nd overall pick
- Drafted by: New York Knicks
- Position: Power forward
- Number: 43

Career history
- 1977–1982: New York Knicks
- Stats at NBA.com
- Stats at Basketball Reference

Toby Thomas Knight (born May 3, 1955) is an American former professional basketball player. He played professionally in the National Basketball Association (NBA) for the New York Knicks. He played college basketball for the Notre Dame Fighting Irish.

== Biography ==
Knight was born in Bronx, New York and graduated from Port Jefferson High School in Port Jefferson, New York.

A 6'9" power forward from the University of Notre Dame, Knight was drafted as the 32nd overall pick in the 1977 NBA draft by the New York Knicks. Knight played in the NBA as a member of the New York Knicks from 1977 to 1982. He averaged 12.9 points per game in his professional career. Knight was waived by the Knicks in 1983, ending his NBA career.

Knight was inducted into the Suffolk Sports Hall of Fame on Long Island in the Basketball Category with the Class of 1992.

== Career statistics ==
Legend
GP	Games played	GS	Games started	MPG	Minutes per game
FG%	Field goal percentage	3P%	3-point field goal percentage	FT%	Free throw percentage
RPG	Rebounds per game	APG	Assists per game	SPG	Steals per game
BPG	Blocks per game	PPG	Points per game	**Bold**	Career high
*	Led the league

=== NBA ===
==== Regular season ====
Year	Team	GP	GS	MPG	FG%	3P%	FT%	RPG	APG	SPG	BPG	PPG
1977–78	New York	80		14.6	.477		.649	4.0	.5	.6	.4	6.3
1978–79	New York	**82***		32.5	.519		.704	**6.7**	1.5	.7	.7	16.6
1979–80	New York	81		**36.4**	.529	.000	**.808**	6.1	**1.9**	**1.4**	**1.1**	**19.1**
1981–82	New York	40	0	13.8	**.557**	–	.680	2.1	.6	.4	.3	5.5
Career		283	0	25.9	.519	.000	.740	5.1	1.2	.9	.7	12.9

==== Playoffs ====
Year	Team	GP	MPG	FG%	FT%	RPG	APG	SPG	BPG	PPG
1978	New York	6	8.0	.300	.500	3.2	.2	.2	.7	2.7
