= Scott Sims (basketball) =

American basketball player

Personal information
- Born: April 18, 1955 (age 71) Kirksville, Missouri, U.S.
- Listed height: 6 ft 1 in (1.85 m)
- Listed weight: 170 lb (77 kg)

Career information
- High school: Kirksville (Kirksville, Missouri)
- College: Missouri (1974–1977)
- NBA draft: 1977: 5th round, 103rd overall pick
- Drafted by: San Antonio Spurs
- Position: Point guard
- Number: 20

Career history
- 1977: San Antonio Spurs
- Stats at NBA.com
- Stats at Basketball Reference

Scott Alan Sims (born April 18, 1955) is an American former professional basketball player.

A 6'1" point guard from the University of Missouri, Sims was selected by the San Antonio Spurs in the fifth round of the 1977 NBA draft. He played 12 games with the Spurs during the 1977-78 NBA season, averaging 2.5 points per game.

== Career statistics ==
Legend
GP	Games played	GS	Games started	MPG	Minutes per game
FG%	Field goal percentage	3P%	3-point field goal percentage	FT%	Free throw percentage
RPG	Rebounds per game	APG	Assists per game	SPG	Steals per game
BPG	Blocks per game	PPG	Points per game	**Bold**	Career high

=== NBA ===
==== Regular season ====
Year	Team	GP	MPG	FG%	FT%	RPG	APG	SPG	BPG	PPG
1977–78	San Antonio	12	7.9	.385	.667	1.1	1.7	.3	.0	2.5
