= Hershell West =

American basketball player

Personal information
- Born: July 8, 1940 (Note: West's obituary uses the birth date of July 8, 1940. Monroe Dispatch gives an alternative birth date of July 8, 1941.) Rayville, Louisiana, U.S.
- Died: January 28, 2023 (aged 82) (Note: West's obituary and Monroe Dispatch use the death date of January 28, 2023. Grambling State University states that he died on January 30, 2023.) Rayville, Louisiana, U.S.
- Listed height: 6 ft 2 in (1.88 m)
- Listed weight: 190 lb (86 kg)

Career information
- High school: Eula D. Britton (Rayville, Louisiana)
- College: Grambling State (1959–1963)
- NBA draft: 1963: 2nd round, 15th overall pick
- Drafted by: Syracuse Nationals
- Position: Guard

Career highlights
- NAIA champion (1961); 2× First-team All-SWAC (1962, 1963)
- Stats at Basketball Reference

Hershell West (July 8, 1940 – January 28, 2023) was an American basketball player and coach. He played basketball at Eula D. Britton in his hometown of Rayville, Louisiana and won the Louisiana State AA Championship in 1959. Grambling State Tigers men's basketball head coach Fred Hobdy offered West and the four other Britton starters athletic scholarships to Grambling State after watching them play. West played college basketball for the Tigers for four years, where he won a National Association of Intercollegiate Athletics (NAIA) championship in 1961 and was a two-time first-team All-Southwestern Athletic Conference (SWAC) selection in 1962 and 1963. In 1962, he and six other Tigers players participated in a goodwill tour of Latin America.

West was selected in the 1963 NBA draft as the 15th overall pick by the Syracuse Nationals but he never played in the National Basketball Association (NBA). He became a basketball coach for Richwood High School in Louisiana, where he served as a mentor to future NBA player Larry Wright. West helped Wright transfer to the larger Western High School in Washington, D.C., where he became a highly recruited prospect. Wright honored West by turning down other collegiate offers to attend Grambling State and play for the Tigers.

West was an inaugural member of the Grambling Legends Sports Hall of Fame in 2009.

West died on January 28, 2023, in Rayville, Louisiana, after a short illness.
