= Mark Crow =

American basketball player (born 1954)

Personal information
- Born: October 22, 1954 (age 72) Edwards Air Force Base, California, U.S.
- Listed height: 6 ft 7 in (2.01 m)
- Listed weight: 207 lb (94 kg)

Career information
- High school: Benedictine (Richmond, Virginia)
- College: Duke (1973–1977)
- NBA draft: 1977: 6th round, 111th overall pick
- Drafted by: New York Nets
- Playing career: 1977–1989
- Position: Small forward
- Number: 31

Career history
- 1977: New Jersey Nets
- 1978: Richmond Virginians
- 1978–1979: Sarila Rimini
- 1979–1980: Sporting CP
- 1980–1986: Fabriano Basket
- 1986–1987: Victoria Libertas Pesaro
- 1987–1988: CB Sevilla
- 1988–1989: Fantoni Udine
- Stats at NBA.com
- Stats at Basketball Reference

Mark Harvey Crow (born October 22, 1954) is an American former professional basketball player who spent one season in the National Basketball Association (NBA) with the New Jersey Nets during the 1977–78 season. He was drafted by the Nets from Duke University back when the Nets represented the New York area in the sixth round (111th overall) during the 1977 NBA draft.

Mark played in Europe from 1978. Playing in Italy, Portugal and Spain. He finished his career in Udine, Italy in 1988. Mark speaks fluent Italian, as well as Spanish and Portuguese.

Following his career, he began player management, working with NBA and international player agent Herb Rudoy.

== Career statistics ==
Legend
GP	Games played	GS	Games started	MPG	Minutes per game
FG%	Field goal percentage	3P%	3-point field goal percentage	FT%	Free throw percentage
RPG	Rebounds per game	APG	Assists per game	SPG	Steals per game
BPG	Blocks per game	PPG	Points per game	**Bold**	Career high

=== NBA ===
==== Regular season ====
Year	Team	GP	MPG	FG%	FT%	RPG	APG	SPG	BPG	PPG
1977–78	New Jersey	15	10.3	.438	.700	1.8	.5	.3	.1	5.6
