= Phil Walker (basketball) =

American basketball player (born 1956)

Personal information
- Born: March 20, 1956 (age 70) Philadelphia, Pennsylvania, U.S.
- Listed height: 6 ft 3 in (1.91 m)
- Listed weight: 180 lb (82 kg)

Career information
- High school: Central (Philadelphia, Pennsylvania)
- College: Millersville (1973–1977)
- NBA draft: 1977: 2nd round, 39th overall pick
- Drafted by: Washington Bullets
- Playing career: 1977–1980
- Position: Shooting guard
- Number: 20

Career history
- 1977–1978: Washington Bullets
- 1978–1979: Lancaster Red Roses
- 1979–1980: Lehigh Valley Jets

Career highlights
- NBA champion (1978)
- Stats at NBA.com
- Stats at Basketball Reference

Phillip B. Walker (born March 20, 1956) is an American former professional basketball player. He won a championship with the Washington Bullets in 1977–78, which was his only season in the league.

Walker attended Millersville University of Pennsylvania and was born in Philadelphia.

== Career statistics ==
Legend
GP	Games played	GS	Games started	MPG	Minutes per game
FG%	Field goal percentage	3P%	3-point field goal percentage	FT%	Free throw percentage
RPG	Rebounds per game	APG	Assists per game	SPG	Steals per game
BPG	Blocks per game	PPG	Points per game	**Bold**	Career high
†	Won an NBA championship

=== NBA ===
==== Regular season ====
Year	Team	GP	MPG	FG%	FT%	RPG	APG	SPG	BPG	PPG
1977–78†	Washington	40	9.6	.354	.667	1.3	1.4	.4	.4	4.5

==== Playoffs ====
Year	Team	GP	MPG	FG%	FT%	RPG	APG	SPG	BPG	PPG
1978†	Washington	4	4.3	.125	.800	.5	.5	.0	.0	1.5
