= Larry Wright (basketball) =

American basketball player (born 1954)

Personal information
- Born: November 23, 1954 (age 71) Monroe, Louisiana, U.S.
- Listed height: 6 ft 1 in (1.85 m)
- Listed weight: 160 lb (73 kg)

Career information
- High school: Richwood (Ouachita Parish, Louisiana); Western (Washington, D.C.)
- College: Grambling State (1973–1976)
- NBA draft: 1976: 1st round, 14th overall pick
- Drafted by: Washington Bullets
- Playing career: 1976–1988
- Position: Point guard
- Number: 32, 15
- Coaching career: 1990–1992, 1999–2008

Career history

Playing
- 1976–1980: Washington Bullets
- 1980–1981: Detroit Pistons
- 1982–1984: Banco di Roma
- 1985–1987: Fantoni Udine
- 1987–1988: Banco di Roma

Coaching
- 1990–1992: Grambling State (assistant)
- 1999–2008: Grambling State

Career highlights
- NBA champion (1978); Italian League champion (1983); FIBA European Champions Cup champion (1984); SWAC Player of the Year (1976); First-team Parade All-American (1973)

Career NBA playing statistics
- Points: 2,824 (8.2 ppg)
- Rebounds: 550 (1.6 rpg)
- Assists: 1,165 (3.4 apg)
- Stats at NBA.com
- Stats at Basketball Reference

Career coaching record
- College: 88–161 (.353)

Larry Glenn Wright (born November 23, 1954) is an American former professional basketball player and coach. He played college basketball for the Grambling State Tigers and was the Southwestern Athletic Conference Men's Basketball Player of the Year in 1976. Wright played in the National Basketball Association (NBA) for the Washington Bullets and the Detroit Pistons. He also played for six seasons in Italy. After his playing retirement, Wright joined the Tigers as an assistant coach from 1990 to 1992 and returned as the head coach from 1999 to 2008.

== College career ==
Wright was a highly recruited prospect while he played at Western High School in Washington, D.C. He chose to commit to the Grambling State Tigers in honor of his mentor Hershell West, who had played for the Tigers and coached Wright when he played at Richwood High School in Louisiana. From 1973 to 1976, Wright was one of the most decorated Grambling players. In 1974, he was named the Southwestern Athletic Conference Freshman of the year. He was also a two-time All-SWAC selection for the remainder of his career, and a two-time first team NCAA Small College All-America. He led the university to the 1976 SWAC Tournament Championship. After being named the SWAC Player-of-the-Year in 1975–76 as a junior, he decided to declare for the 1976 NBA draft.

== Professional career ==
=== NBA ===
Wright was selected with the 14th pick overall in the 1976 NBA draft by the Washington Bullets. He played a significant part of the Bullets' successful team of the late 1970s, as a substitute. With the Bullets he won an NBA title in 1978 and reached the Finals the next year. After a disappointing season in which they were knocked out from the playoffs by the Philadelphia 76ers, he was traded to the Detroit Pistons, for whom he played only 46 games in two seasons. He decided to move to Italy in 1982 and signed with Banco di Roma.

=== Superstar in Italy ===
Wright was an immediate star in Italy. The team finished the regular season in first place and reached the finals series against Olimpia Milano after defeating European champions Ford Cantù in the semi-final series, with homecourt advantage in hand in the final. Roma won the series 2 games to 1 and won its first ever Italian championship. The next season was even greater, as Roma participated in the FIBA European Champions Cup as Italian champions, and Wright provided one stellar performance after another. Roma finished the Final group stage first placed tied with Barcelona, so the two teams qualified for the final game for the European champions cup in Geneva. Wright was the top scorer for his team, of the 79–73 final win, scoring 27 points and leading Roma to its first ever European title in their first finals appearance. Wright was also selected as the European player of the year. Although he had a successful season, Wright left the team after failing to qualify to the Italian playoffs and signed with Fantoni Udine where he played for two seasons. In 1987 he returned to Banco di Roma for one more season.

== Coaching career ==
Wright already was a player-coach in his last days in Italy. He was appointed assistant coach at Grambling in 1990 and stayed for office for two seasons. Afterwards he was a scout for the Seattle SuperSonics and the Washington Wizards, and an assistance coach at Ouachita High School in his hometown of Monroe, Louisiana. In 1999 Wright was appointed head coach at Grambling. He was released from his duties in April 2008.

== Career playing statistics ==
Legend
GP	Games played	GS	Games started	MPG	Minutes per game
FG%	Field goal percentage	3P%	3-point field goal percentage	FT%	Free throw percentage
RPG	Rebounds per game	APG	Assists per game	SPG	Steals per game
BPG	Blocks per game	PPG	Points per game	**Bold**	Career high
†	Won an NBA championship

=== NBA ===
==== Regular season ====
Year	Team	GP	GS	MPG	FG%	3P%	FT%	RPG	APG	SPG	BPG	PPG
1976–77	Washington	**78**		18.2	.440		.765	1.3	3.0	.7	.1	7.8
1977–78†	Washington	70		20.9	**.496**		.710	1.5	3.7	**1.0**	**.2**	9.2
1978–79	Washington	73		**22.7**	.469		.744	1.9	**4.1**	.9	**.2**	**9.3**
1979–80	Washington	76		16.9	.458	.250	**.889**	1.6	2.9	.6	**.2**	7.3
1980–81	Detroit	45		22.2	.462	**.286**	.803	**2.0**	3.4	.9	**.2**	7.4
1981–82	Detroit	1	0	6.0	.000	–	–	.0	.0	.0	.0	.0
Career		343	0	19.9	.465	.261	.777	1.6	3.4	.8	.2	8.2

==== Playoffs ====
Year	Team	GP	MPG	FG%	3P%	FT%	RPG	APG	SPG	BPG	PPG
1977	Washington	8	13.0	.487		.714	.9	2.0	.9	.1	6.6
1978†	Washington	**21**	**19.1**	.466		.760	**1.5**	**3.2**	.8	.1	8.1
1979	Washington	18	18.4	.481		**.900**	1.4	2.4	.6	**.2**	8.4
1980	Washington	2	16.5	**.529**	.000	.800	1.0	3.0	**1.5**	.0	**11.0**
Career		49	17.8	.477	.000	.802	1.3	2.7	.8	.1	8.1
