= Tony Robertson =

American basketball player (born 1956)

Personal information
- Born: January 1, 1956 (age 70) Detroit, Michigan, U.S.
- Listed height: 6 ft 4 in (1.93 m)
- Listed weight: 195 lb (88 kg)

Career information
- High school: Southwestern (Detroit, Michigan)
- College: Eastern Arizona (1973–1975); West Virginia (1975–1977)
- NBA draft: 1977: 4th round, 88th overall pick
- Drafted by: Los Angeles Lakers
- Position: Shooting guard
- Number: 4, 25

Career history
- 1977–1978: Atlanta Hawks
- 1979: Golden State Warriors

Career highlights
- First-team All-Eastern 8 (1977)
- Stats at NBA.com
- Stats at Basketball Reference

Darryl "Tony" Robertson (born January 1, 1956) is an American former basketball player in the National Basketball Association (NBA) for the Atlanta Hawks and Golden State Warriors. He played college basketball at West Virginia University.

== Early life ==
Born in Detroit, Michigan, he attended Southwestern High School. As a senior, he contributed to the team winning the state championship, while scoring 20 points and 9 rebounds per game.

== College career ==
Robertson enrolled at Eastern Arizona Junior College. As a freshman shooting guard, he averaged 21 points, 5 assists and 8 rebounds per game. As a sophomore, he averaged 23 points, 6 assists and 10 rebounds per game. He set Dodge City Tournament records with 93 points and 42 field goals, while helping his team finish in second place. He received All-tournament and honorable-mention All-American honors.

Robertson transferred to West Virginia University for his junior season. He averaged 17.9 points, 3.6 assists and 4.4 rebounds.

As a senior, he scored 18.1 points, 3.3 assists and 4.0 rebounds. He had a career-high 34 points and 10 assists against Richmond University. He made a career-high 12 rebounds against the University of New Hampshire. He posted 7 steals against Virginia Tech.

Robertson registered 57 starts, 1,026 points, while averaging 18.0 points (seventh in school history), 3.4 assists and 4.2 rebounds per game in two seasons.

In 2020, he was inducted into the West Virginia University Sports Hall of Fame.

== Professional career ==
Robertson was selected by the Los Angeles Lakers in the fourth round (88th overall) of the 1977 NBA draft. On October 17, he was traded to the Atlanta Hawks in exchange for a 1979 fourth round pick (#79-Ray White).

In 1977, he averaged 5.9 points, 1.6 assists, 1.2 steals and 4.4 rebounds. On September 21, 1978, he was waived by the Atlanta Hawks.

On February 18, 1979, he signed as a free agent with the Golden State Warriors, to provide depth after Phil Smith was lost for the season with an Achilles injury.

On June 21, 1981, he was invited by the Atlanta Hawks to participate in a three-day rookie and free-agent camp. He wasn't signed at the end of the workout sessions.

== Career statistics ==
Legend
GP	Games played	GS	Games started	MPG	Minutes per game
FG%	Field goal percentage	3P%	3-point field goal percentage	FT%	Free throw percentage
RPG	Rebounds per game	APG	Assists per game	SPG	Steals per game
BPG	Blocks per game	PPG	Points per game	**Bold**	Career high

=== NBA ===
==== Regular season ====
Year	Team	GP	MPG	FG%	FT%	RPG	APG	SPG	BPG	PPG
1977–78	Atlanta	**63**	**14.7**	**.441**	**.698**	**1.1**	**1.6**	**1.2**	**.1**	**5.9**
1978–79	Golden State	12	6.2	.375	.667	.8	.3	.7	.0	3.0
Career		75	13.4	.435	.694	1.1	1.4	1.1	.1	4.5

==== Playoffs ====
Year	Team	GP	MPG	FG%	FT%	RPG	APG	SPG	BPG	PPG
1978	Atlanta	2	6.0	.333	.500	.0	.0	.0	.0	2.5
