= Eddie Owens =

American basketball player (born 1953)

Personal information
- Born: December 26, 1953 (age 72)
- Listed height: 6 ft 7 in (2.01 m)
- Listed weight: 210 lb (95 kg)

Career information
- High school: Wheatley (Houston, Texas)
- College: UNLV (1973–1977)
- NBA draft: 1977: 2nd round, 31st overall pick
- Drafted by: Kansas City Kings
- Position: Small forward
- Number: 40

Career history
- 1977–1978: Rochester Zeniths
- 1978: Buffalo Braves
- 1978–1979: Rochester Zeniths
- 1979: Mohawk Valley Thunderbirds

Career highlights
- No. 11 retired by UNLV Runnin' Rebels; 2× Second-team Parade All-American (1972, 1973)
- Stats at NBA.com
- Stats at Basketball Reference

Eddie Owens (born December 26, 1953) is an American former basketball player who played briefly in the National Basketball Association (NBA) He was named a Parade Magazine third-team All-American in highschool in 1973.

After playing for UNLV, he was selected by the Kansas City Kings in the second round of the 1977 NBA draft. He played for the Buffalo Braves during the 1977–78 season. He appeared in eight games for the Braves, averaging 2.6 points. He is the all-time leading scorer for UNLV.

== Career statistics ==
Legend
GP	Games played	GS	Games started	MPG	Minutes per game
FG%	Field goal percentage	3P%	3-point field goal percentage	FT%	Free throw percentage
RPG	Rebounds per game	APG	Assists per game	SPG	Steals per game
BPG	Blocks per game	PPG	Points per game	**Bold**	Career high

=== NBA ===
==== Regular season ====
Year	Team	GP	MPG	FG%	FT%	RPG	APG	SPG	BPG	PPG
1977–78	Buffalo	8	7.9	.429	.500	1.3	.6	.1	.0	2.6
