= 1977–78 Atlanta Hawks season =

NBA professional basketball team season

- Head coach: Hubie Brown
- Arena: Omni Coliseum

Results
- Record: 41–41 (.500)
- Place: Division: 4th (Central); Conference: 6th (Eastern)
- Playoff finish: East First Round (Eliminated 0–2)
- Stats at Basketball Reference

Local media
- Television: WTCG
- Radio: WSB

The 1977–78 Atlanta Hawks season was the Hawks' 29th season in the NBA and 10th season in Atlanta.

== Roster ==
Atlanta Hawks roster
Players

Pos.	No.	Player	Height	Weight	DOB	From
F	50	John Brown	6 ft 7 in (2.01 m)	220 lb (100 kg)		Missouri
G	44	Ken Charles	6 ft 3 in (1.91 m)	180 lb (82 kg)		Fordham
G	14	Charlie Criss	5 ft 8 in (1.73 m)	165 lb (75 kg)		New Mexico State
G	22	John Drew	6 ft 6 in (1.98 m)	205 lb (93 kg)		Gardner–Webb
C	10	Steve Hawes	6 ft 9 in (2.06 m)	220 lb (100 kg)		Washington
G	24	Armond Hill	6 ft 4 in (1.93 m)	190 lb (86 kg)		Princeton
G	3	Eddie Johnson	6 ft 2 in (1.88 m)	180 lb (82 kg)		Auburn
SF	27	Ollie Johnson	6 ft 6 in (1.98 m)	200 lb (91 kg)		Temple
C	54	Tom McMillen	6 ft 11 in (2.11 m)	215 lb (98 kg)		Maryland
G	4	Tony Robertson	6 ft 4 in (1.93 m)	195 lb (88 kg)		West Virginia
C	30	Tree Rollins	7 ft 1 in (2.16 m)	235 lb (107 kg)		Clemson

Coaches
Head coach
- Hubie Brown

Legend
- (DP) Unsigned draft pick
- (FA) Free agent
- (S) Suspended
- Injured

== Regular season ==
=== Season standings ===
Central Division	W	L	PCT	GB	Home	Road	Div
y-San Antonio Spurs	52	30	.634	–	32–9	20–21	15–5
x-Washington Bullets	44	38	.537	8	29–12	15–26	14–6
x-Cleveland Cavaliers	43	39	.524	9	27–14	16–25	9–11
x-Atlanta Hawks	41	41	.500	11	29–12	12–29	8–12
New Orleans Jazz	39	43	.476	13	27–14	12–29	8–12
Houston Rockets	28	54	.341	24	21-20	7-34	6–14

#	Eastern Conference				
#	Team	W	L	PCT	GB
1	z-Philadelphia 76ers	55	27	.671	–
2	y-San Antonio Spurs	52	30	.634	3
3	x-Washington Bullets	44	38	.537	11
4	x-Cleveland Cavaliers	43	39	.524	12
5	x-New York Knicks	43	39	.524	12
6	x-Atlanta Hawks	41	41	.500	14
7	New Orleans Jazz	39	43	.476	16
8	Boston Celtics	32	50	.390	23
9	Houston Rockets	28	54	.341	27
10	Buffalo Braves	27	55	.329	28
11	New Jersey Nets	24	58	.293	31

z – clinched division title
y – clinched division title
x – clinched playoff spot

== Playoffs ==
1978 playoff game log
First Round: 0–2 (home: 0–1; road: 0–1)

Game	Date	Team	Score	High points	High rebounds	High assists	Location Attendance	Series
1	April 12	@ Washington	L 94–103	John Drew (25)	Tom McMillen (14)	Eddie Johnson (4)	Capital Centre; 9,326	0–1
2	April 14	Washington	L 103–107 (OT)	John Drew (27)	Drew, McMillen (8)	Hill, Hawes (5)	Omni Coliseum; 15,601	0–2

1978 schedule

== Awards and records ==
- Hubie Brown, NBA Coach of the Year Award
