= 1977–78 Philadelphia 76ers season =

NBA professional basketball team season

- Division champions
- Head coach: Gene Shue (fired); Billy Cunningham
- General manager: Pat Williams
- Arena: The Spectrum

Results
- Record: 55–27 (.671)
- Place: Division: 1st (Atlantic); Conference: 1st (Eastern)
- Playoff finish: Conference finals (lost to Bullets 2–4)
- Stats at Basketball Reference

Local media
- Television: WKBS-TV; PRISM
- Radio: WCAU

The 1977–78 Philadelphia 76ers season was the 76ers 29th season in the NBA and 15th season in Philadelphia. The team finished the regular season with a record of 55–27. Head coach Gene Shue was replaced only 6 games into the season, by former Sixers player Billy Cunningham, who was only 34 years old at the time he replaced Shue. In the playoffs, the Sixers would sweep the New York Knicks, but lose in the Eastern Conference finals to the Washington Bullets, a team with 11 fewer wins, 4 games to 2.

Following the season, George McGinnis was traded to the Denver Nuggets for Bobby Jones and World B. Free was dealt to the San Diego Clippers for a 1984 first round draft pick which would become Charles Barkley.

== Offseason ==
=== Draft picks ===
Round	Pick	Player	Position	Nationality	College
1	20	Glenn Mosley	PF	United States	Seton Hall
2	25	Wilson Washington	PF/C	United States	Old Dominion
2	42	Bob Elliott	C/PF	United States	Arizona
2	43	Herm Harris	F	United States	Arizona
3	64	Arnold Dugger	SG	United States	Oral Roberts
4	86	Jack Jones	PG	United States	Utah
5	108	Teko Wynder		United States	Tulsa
6	129	George Gibson		United States	Winston-Salem State
7	149	Dennin Forest		United States	Omaha
8	168	John Olive	SF	United States	Villanova

== Roster ==
Philadelphia 76ers roster
Players

Pos.	No.	Player	Height	Weight	DOB	From
PG	14	Henry Bibby	6 ft 1 in (1.85 m)	185 lb (84 kg)		UCLA
PF	23	Joe Bryant	6 ft 9 in (2.06 m)	215 lb (98 kg)		La Salle
C	42	Harvey Catchings	6 ft 10 in (2.08 m)	218 lb (99 kg)		Hardin–Simmons
SG	20	Doug Collins	6 ft 6 in (1.98 m)	180 lb (82 kg)		Illinois State
C	53	Darryl Dawkins	6 ft 11 in (2.11 m)	251 lb (114 kg)
SF	6	Julius Erving	6 ft 7 in (2.01 m)	240 lb (109 kg)		UMass
SG	21	World B. Free	6 ft 2 in (1.88 m)	185 lb (84 kg)		Guilford
C	11	Caldwell Jones	6 ft 11 in (2.11 m)	217 lb (98 kg)		Albany State
PG	12	Ted McClain	6 ft 2 in (1.88 m)	190 lb (86 kg)		Tennessee State
PF	30	George McGinnis	6 ft 8 in (2.03 m)	235 lb (107 kg)		Indiana
SF	50	Steve Mix	6 ft 7 in (2.01 m)	215 lb (98 kg)		Toledo
PF	34	Glenn Mosley	6 ft 8 in (2.03 m)	195 lb (88 kg)		Seton Hall
PF	52	Wilson Washington	6 ft 9 in (2.06 m)	227 lb (103 kg)		Old Dominion

Coaches
Head coach
- Billy Cunningham

Legend
- (DP) Unsigned draft pick
- (FA) Free agent
- (S) Suspended
- Injured

== Regular season ==
=== Season standings ===
Atlantic Division	W	L	PCT	GB	Home	Road	Div
y-Philadelphia 76ers	55	27	.671	–	37–4	18–23	14–2
x-New York Knicks	43	39	.524	12	29–12	14–27	7–9
Boston Celtics	32	50	.390	23	24–17	8–33	8–8
Buffalo Braves	27	55	.329	28	20–21	7–34	7–9
New Jersey Nets	24	58	.293	31	18–23	6–35	4–12

#	Eastern Conference				
#	Team	W	L	PCT	GB
1	z-Philadelphia 76ers	55	27	.671	–
2	y-San Antonio Spurs	52	30	.634	3
3	x-Washington Bullets	44	38	.537	11
4	x-Cleveland Cavaliers	43	39	.524	12
5	x-New York Knicks	43	39	.524	12
6	x-Atlanta Hawks	41	41	.500	14
7	New Orleans Jazz	39	43	.476	16
8	Boston Celtics	32	50	.390	23
9	Houston Rockets	28	54	.341	27
10	Buffalo Braves	27	55	.329	28
11	New Jersey Nets	24	58	.293	31

z – clinched division title
y – clinched division title
x – clinched playoff spot

== Playoffs ==
1978 playoff game log
Conference semifinals: 4–0 (home: 2–0; road: 2–0)

Game	Date	Team	Score	High points	High rebounds	High assists	Location Attendance	Series
1	April 16	New York	W 130–90	Steve Mix (19)	Caldwell Jones (16)	Steve Mix (7)	Spectrum; 13,011	1–0
2	April 18	New York	W 119–100	Julius Erving (22)	Caldwell Jones (11)	Darryl Dawkins (6)	Spectrum; 15,853	2–0
3	April 20	@ New York	W 137–126	McGinnis, Free (29)	Julius Erving (10)	Collins, Erving (7)	Madison Square Garden; 18,697	3–0
4	April 23	@ New York	W 112–107	Doug Collins (24)	Caldwell Jones (14)	Collins, Erving (4)	Madison Square Garden; 16,307	4–0

Conference finals: 2–4 (home: 2–1; road: 0–3)

Game	Date	Team	Score	High points	High rebounds	High assists	Location Attendance	Series
1	April 30	Washington	L 117–122 (OT)	Julius Erving (25)	George McGinnis (15)	three players tied (5)	Spectrum; 13,708	0–1
2	May 3	Washington	W 110–104	Doug Collins (28)	Erving, Dawkins (11)	Henry Bibby (9)	Spectrum; 18,276	1–1
3	May 5	@ Washington	L 108–123	George McGinnis (16)	Julius Erving (10)	Henry Bibby (5)	Capital Centre; 19,035	1–2
4	May 7	@ Washington	L 105–121	Julius Erving (24)	Caldwell Jones (13)	World B. Free (6)	Capital Centre; 19,035	1–3
5	May 10	Washington	W 107–94	Collins, Erving (24)	Caldwell Jones (15)	Henry Bibby (10)	Spectrum; 18,276	2–3
6	May 12	@ Washington	L 99–101	Doug Collins (33)	Erving, McGinnis (8)	Henry Bibby (5)	Capital Centre; 19,035	2–4

1978 schedule

== Awards and records ==
- Julius Erving, All-NBA First Team
