= Kevin Grevey =

American former basketball player (born 1953)

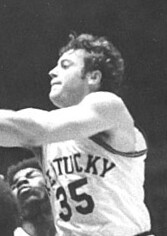

Personal information
- Born: May 12, 1953 (age 73) Hamilton, Ohio, U.S.
- Listed height: 6 ft 5 in (1.96 m)
- Listed weight: 210 lb (95 kg)

Career information
- High school: Taft (Hamilton, Ohio)
- College: Kentucky (1972–1975)
- NBA draft: 1975: 1st round, 18th overall pick
- Drafted by: Washington Bullets
- Playing career: 1975–1985
- Position: Shooting guard / small forward
- Number: 35

Career history
- 1975–1983: Washington Bullets
- 1983–1985: Milwaukee Bucks

Career highlights
- NBA champion (1978); Consensus second-team All-American (1975); 2× SEC Player of the Year – AP (1973, 1975)

Career NBA statistics
- Points: 7,364 (11.0 ppg)
- Assists: 1,247 (1.9 apg)
- Rebounds: 1,594 (2.4 rpg)
- Stats at NBA.com
- Stats at Basketball Reference

Kevin Michael Grevey (born May 12, 1953) is an American former professional basketball player. A 6-foot-5-inch (1.96 m) swingman, the left-handed Grevey played for the Washington Bullets from 1975 to 1983 and the Milwaukee Bucks from 1983 to 1985. He worked as a Talent Scout with the Los Angeles Lakers for nineteen seasons and is now a scout with the Charlotte Hornets and a color commentator for various college basketball games, including on national radio with Westwood One.

== University of Kentucky ==
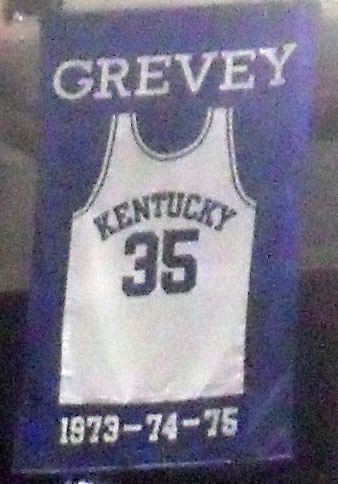
A jersey honoring Grevey hangs in Rupp Arena

Grevey played college basketball for the Kentucky Wildcats, where he was a member of legendary coach Adolph Rupp's last freshman class and played his three collegiate seasons (freshmen were not eligible to play varsity basketball at the time) under Rupp's successor, Joe B. Hall. He was named First-Team All-Southeastern Conference in all three of his college seasons and All-American in his junior and senior years. In his senior year Kentucky lost to UCLA in the championship game of the NCAA tournament in what would be the final game in the career of UCLA's legendary coach John Wooden; Grevey scored a game-high 34 points and was named to the all-Final Four team.

Upon completion of his collegiate career, Grevey scored 1,801 points, which at the time ranked him second in University of Kentucky history behind only Dan Issel's 2,138. His jersey number, 35, is retired by the University of Kentucky.

== Professional career ==
In 1975, Grevey was selected by the Washington Bullets in the first round (18th pick) of the NBA draft and by the San Diego Sails in the first round (sixth pick) of the 1975 ABA Draft. Grevey signed with the Bullets and played mostly as a backup small forward and shooting guard his first two seasons. When Phil Chenier suffered a season-ending back injury early in the 1977–78 season, Grevey became the starting off guard and averaged 15.5 points per game. The Bullets won their only NBA championship that season, led by Grevey, newly acquired Bob Dandridge and the future Hall-of-Fame duo of Elvin Hayes and Wes Unseld.

Grevey enjoyed four more solid seasons in Washington, averaging no less than 13.3 points per game. An injury sidelined him for half of the 1982–83 season and reduced him to a reserve for the remainder of his career. He played his final two seasons with the Milwaukee Bucks. In his ten NBA seasons, Grevey played 672 games and scored 7,364 points, for an average of 11.0 points per game. Grevey was one of six players to have made a three-pointer shot to start the 1979–80 NBA season, the first with the rule enacted; for a decade, Grevey believed he was the first to have made the shot, although this was not the case.

== Personal life ==
In 1979 Grevey founded Grevey's restaurant, a popular sports bar and restaurant in Merrifield, Virginia. The restaurant operated for 37 years, closing in 2016.

== NBA career statistics ==
Legend
GP	Games played	GS	Games started	MPG	Minutes per game
FG%	Field goal percentage	3P%	3-point field goal percentage	FT%	Free throw percentage
RPG	Rebounds per game	APG	Assists per game	SPG	Steals per game
BPG	Blocks per game	PPG	Points per game	**Bold**	Career high
†	Won an NBA championship	*	Led the league

=== Regular season ===
Year	Team	GP	GS	MPG	FG%	3P%	FT%	RPG	APG	SPG	BPG	PPG
1975–76	Washington	56	-	9.0	.371	-	**.897**	1.1	0.5	0.2	0.1	3.8
1976–77	Washington	76	-	17.2	.423	-	.664	2.3	0.9	0.4	0.1	6.9
1977–78†	Washington	**81**	-	26.2	.448	-	.789	**3.6**	1.9	0.8	0.2	15.5
1978–79	Washington	65	-	28.6	**.453**	-	.772	**3.6**	2.4	0.7	0.2	15.5
1979–80	Washington	65	-	28.0	.412	.370	.867	2.9	2.7	**0.9**	0.2	14.0
1980–81	Washington	75	-	**34.9**	**.453**	.331	.841	2.9	**4.0**	**0.9**	0.2	**17.2**
1981–82	Washington	71	**62**	30.5	.439	.341	.855	2.7	2.1	0.6	**0.3**	13.3
1982–83	Washington	41	11	18.4	.388	**.395**	.783	1.2	1.2	0.4	0.2	7.2
1983–84	Milwaukee	64	3	14.4	.451	.283	.893	1.3	1.2	0.4	0.1	7.0
1984–85	Milwaukee	78	6	15.2	.448	.242	.822	1.3	1.2	0.4	0.0	6.1
Career		672	82	22.7	.437	.334	.817	2.4	1.9	0.6	0.2	11.0

=== Playoffs ===
Year	Team	GP	GS	MPG	FG%	3P%	FT%	RPG	APG	SPG	BPG	PPG
1975–76	Washington	2	-	1.5	.500	-	.000	0.0	0.0	0.0	0.0	1.0
1976–77	Washington	9	-	25.0	.409	-	.652	1.8	0.9	0.2	0.6	9.7
1977–78†	Washington	**21**	-	27.8	.444	-	.811	2.9	2.0	0.5	0.1	15.5
1978–79	Washington	19*	-	27.7	.398	-	.755	2.5	1.6	0.8	0.4	12.8
1979–80	Washington	2	-	**36.0**	**.533**	**.500***	**1.000**	**3.0**	**4.0**	**2.5**	**1.0**	**20.5**
1981–82	Washington	7	-	22.7	.411	**.500**	.842	1.4	1.6	0.4	0.1	9.4
1983–84	Milwaukee	5	-	5.4	.222	.000	.667	0.4	0.2	0.0	0.0	1.6
1984–85	Milwaukee	5	0	5.6	.308	.000	**1.000**	0.4	0.4	0.4	0.0	2.4
Career		70	0	23.2	.420	.500	.784	2.1	1.5	0.5	0.3	11.2
