= 1977–78 Buffalo Braves season =

NBA professional basketball team season

- Head coach: Cotton Fitzsimmons
- President: Norm Sonju
- General manager: Norm Sonju
- Owners: John Y. Brown Jr.; Harry T. Mangurian Jr.
- Arena: Buffalo Memorial Auditorium

Results
- Record: 27–55 (.329)
- Place: Division: 4th (Atlantic); Conference: 10th (Eastern)
- Playoff finish: Did not qualify
- Stats at Basketball Reference

Local media
- Television: WIVB-TV
- Radio: WBEN

The 1977–78 NBA season was the Braves' eighth and final season in the NBA. Entering the season, the Braves were allowed an escape clause in their lease, because season ticket sales did not reach the set goal of 4,500. The Braves suffered another disappointment as Tiny Archibald (whom they acquired from the New Jersey Nets for George Johnson) was lost for the year due to an Achilles tendon injury in the preseason.

The Braves played competitively in November with a respectable .500 record at 10–10. Despite the promising start, the Braves won just nine games over the next three months. While the Braves were struggling on the court, owner John Y. Brown was brokering a deal to take over the legendary Boston Celtics franchise. Celtics owner Irv Levin wanted to move the historic franchise to California. However, the NBA would not allow him to take the cornerstone franchise out of Boston.

NBA Lawyer David Stern offered a comprise in which Levin and Brown would swap franchises. The concept was that Levin would take over the Braves and move them to San Diego. The Braves finished in fourth place in the Atlantic Division with a 27–55 (.329) record, and played their last game on April 9, ironically, in Boston. Owners voted 21–1 to approve the deal, and the Braves moved from Buffalo to San Diego; the team was renamed the San Diego Clippers for the 1978–79 season.

The deal also included a seven-player trade in which the Celtics acquired Archibald, Billy Knight, and Marvin Barnes. The San Diego-bound Braves received Freeman Williams, back-up center Kevin Kunnert, and power forwards Kermit Washington and Sidney Wicks. The team would not request a draft pick in the deal, allowing the Celtics to retain the draft rights to Larry Bird in 1979.

== Offseason ==
=== NBA draft ===
Round	Pick	Player	Position	Nationality	College
2	24	Larry Johnson	Guard	United States	Kentucky
4	68	Melvin Watkins	Guard	United States	UNC Charlotte
5	90	Mike Hanley	Forward	United States	Niagara University
6	112	Curvan Lewis	Forward	United States	Virginia Union
7	133	Mike Jackson	Guard	United States	Tennessee
8	153	Emery Sammons	Guard	United States	Philadelphia T&S

== Roster ==
1977–78 Buffalo Braves roster
Players

Pos.	No.	Player	Height	Weight	DOB	From
G	1	Nate Archibald (injured) (IN)	6 ft 1 in (1.85 m)	165 lb (75 kg)		UTEP
G	15	Bird Averitt	6 ft 2 in (1.88 m)	175 lb (79 kg)		Pepperdine
F	8	Marvin Barnes	6 ft 9 in (2.06 m)	225 lb (102 kg)		Providence
G	7	Gary Brokaw	6 ft 4 in (1.93 m)	180 lb (82 kg)		Notre Dame
F	22	Gus Gerard (to DET)	6 ft 8 in (2.03 m)	205 lb (93 kg)		Virginia
G	14	Mike Glenn	6 ft 3 in (1.91 m)	175 lb (79 kg)		Southern Illinois
G	10	Larry Johnson	6 ft 3 in (1.91 m)	205 lb (93 kg)		Kentucky
F	24	Wil Jones	6 ft 8 in (2.03 m)	205 lb (93 kg)		Albany State
G	25	Billy Knight	6 ft 6 in (1.98 m)	195 lb (88 kg)		Pittsburgh
C	45	Scott Lloyd	6 ft 10 in (2.08 m)	230 lb (104 kg)		Arizona State
G	12	Ted McClain	6 ft 2 in (1.88 m)	190 lb (86 kg)		Tennessee State
C	44	Jim McDaniels	7 ft 0 in (2.13 m)	240 lb (109 kg)		Western Kentucky
F	43	Larry McNeill	6 ft 9 in (2.06 m)	195 lb (88 kg)		Marquette
C	31	Swen Nater	6 ft 11 in (2.11 m)	240 lb (109 kg)		UCLA
F	40	Eddie Owens	6 ft 7 in (2.01 m)	210 lb (95 kg)		UNLV
F	34	John Shumate	6 ft 9 in (2.06 m)	235 lb (107 kg)		Notre Dame
G	9	Randy Smith	6 ft 3 in (1.91 m)	185 lb (84 kg)		Buffalo State
G	11	Chuck Williams	6 ft 3 in (1.91 m)	185 lb (84 kg)		Colorado
F	32	Bill Willoughby	6 ft 8 in (2.03 m)	205 lb (93 kg)		Dwight Morrow HS (NJ)

Coaches
Head coach
- Cotton Fitzsimmons

Legend
- (DP) Unsigned draft pick
- (FA) Free agent
- (S) Suspended
- Injured

== Regular season ==
=== Season standings ===
Atlantic Division	W	L	PCT	GB	Home	Road	Div
y-Philadelphia 76ers	55	27	.671	–	37–4	18–23	14–2
x-New York Knicks	43	39	.524	12	29–12	14–27	7–9
Boston Celtics	32	50	.390	23	24–17	8–33	8–8
Buffalo Braves	27	55	.329	28	20–21	7–34	7–9
New Jersey Nets	24	58	.293	31	18–23	6–35	4–12

#	Eastern Conference				
#	Team	W	L	PCT	GB
1	z-Philadelphia 76ers	55	27	.671	–
2	y-San Antonio Spurs	52	30	.634	3
3	x-Washington Bullets	44	38	.537	11
4	x-Cleveland Cavaliers	43	39	.524	12
5	x-New York Knicks	43	39	.524	12
6	x-Atlanta Hawks	41	41	.500	14
7	New Orleans Jazz	39	43	.476	16
8	Boston Celtics	32	50	.390	23
9	Houston Rockets	28	54	.341	27
10	Buffalo Braves	27	55	.329	28
11	New Jersey Nets	24	58	.293	31

== Game log ==
=== Regular season ===
1977–78 game log
Total: 27–55 (home: 20–21; road: 7–34)
October

Game	Date	Team	Score	High points	High rebounds	High assists	Location Attendance	Record

November

Game	Date	Team	Score	High points	High rebounds	High assists	Location Attendance	Record

December

Game	Date	Team	Score	High points	High rebounds	High assists	Location Attendance	Record

January

Game	Date	Team	Score	High points	High rebounds	High assists	Location Attendance	Record

February

Game	Date	Team	Score	High points	High rebounds	High assists	Location Attendance	Record

March

Game	Date	Team	Score	High points	High rebounds	High assists	Location Attendance	Record

April

Game	Date	Team	Score	High points	High rebounds	High assists	Location Attendance	Record

1977–78 schedule

== Player stats ==
Legend
GP	Games played	MPG	Minutes per game	FG	Field-goals per game	FGA	Field-goals attempted per Game
FG%	Field-goal percentage	FT	Free-throws per game	FTA	Free-throws attempted per Game	FT%	Free-throw percentage
ORPG	Offensive rebounds per game	DRPG	Defensive rebounds per game	RPG	Rebounds per game	APG	Assists per game
SPG	Steals per game	BPG	Blocks per game	PFPG	Personal fouls per game	PPG	Points per game

Player	GP	MPG	FG	FGA	FG%	FT	FTA	FT%	ORPG	DRPG	RPG	APG	SPG	BPG	PFPG	PPG
Billy Knight	53	40.7	8.6	17.5	0.494	5.7	7.0	0.809	2.4	4.8	7.2	3.0	1.5	0.2	2.6	22.9
Randy Smith	82	40.4	9.6	20.7	0.465	5.4	6.8	0.800	1.3	2.4	3.8	5.6	2.1	0.1	2.7	24.6
Swen Nater	78	35.6	6.4	12.7	0.504	2.7	3.5	0.765	3.6	9.6	13.2	2.8	0.5	0.6	3.5	15.5
John Shumate	18	32.8	4.2	8.4	0.497	4.1	5.5	0.747	1.8	5.3	7.1	3.2	0.8	0.5	3.2	12.4
Marvin Barnes	48	28.7	4.7	11.3	0.416	2.4	3.2	0.745	2.2	5.0	7.3	2.4	1.2	1.5	4.1	11.8
Chuck Williams	73	27.4	2.8	6.0	0.477	1.6	1.9	0.826	0.4	1.5	1.9	4.3	0.7	0.1	1.9	7.3
Larry McNeill	37	23.6	4.2	9.1	0.462	3.5	4.2	0.833	2.1	3.0	5.1	1.2	0.5	0.3	2.7	11.9
Wil Jones	79	21.7	2.9	6.5	0.440	1.1	1.5	0.706	1.3	2.9	4.2	1.5	0.9	0.5	3.2	6.8
Bird Averitt	34	19.9	3.8	8.7	0.436	1.9	2.8	0.667	0.3	1.2	1.5	3.8	0.6	0.2	2.5	9.5
Bill Willoughby	56	19.3	2.8	6.5	0.430	1.1	1.4	0.800	1.4	2.6	3.9	0.7	0.4	0.8	2.3	6.7
Ted McClain	41	17.7	2.0	4.5	0.440	1.2	1.5	0.794	0.3	1.6	1.8	3.0	1.0	0.0	2.1	5.2
Mike Glenn	56	16.9	3.5	6.6	0.527	0.9	1.2	0.785	0.3	1.2	1.4	1.4	0.6	0.1	1.8	7.9
Jim McDaniels	42	16.5	2.4	5.6	0.427	0.9	1.0	0.857	1.1	3.2	4.3	1.0	0.1	0.9	2.7	5.6
Scott Lloyd	56	10.1	1.2	2.9	0.425	0.8	1.0	0.741	0.8	1.3	2.1	0.6	0.2	0.2	1.5	3.2
Gary Brokaw	13	10.0	1.4	3.3	0.419	1.4	1.8	0.750	0.2	0.7	0.9	1.5	0.2	0.4	0.8	4.2
Larry Johnson	4	9.5	0.8	3.3	0.231	0.0	0.5	0.000	0.3	1.0	1.3	1.8	1.3	0.5	0.8	1.5
Gus Gerard	10	8.5	1.6	4.0	0.400	1.1	1.5	0.733	0.6	0.8	1.4	0.9	0.2	0.3	1.3	4.3
Eddie Owens	8	7.9	1.1	2.6	0.429	0.4	0.8	0.500	0.6	0.6	1.3	0.6	0.1	0.0	0.4	1.1

== Awards and honors ==
- Randy Smith, 1978 NBA All-Star Game MVP

== Transactions ==
The Braves were involved in the following transactions during the 1977–78 season.

=== Coaching Change ===
Offseason
Outgoing Coach	Date Removed	1976-77 Record	Incoming Coach
Joe Mullaney (interim)	Fired, August 5, 1977	11–18	Cotton Fitzsimmons

=== Trades ===
June 7, 1977
To Buffalo Braves

- Swen Nater & the 13th pick in the 1977 NBA Draft
To Milwaukee Bucks

- The 3rd pick in the 1977 NBA Draft
June 10, 1977
To Buffalo Braves

- A 1977 2nd round draft pick
To Chicago Bulls

- The 13th pick in the 1977 NBA Draft
June 10, 1977
To Buffalo Braves

- Johnny Neumann
To Los Angeles Lakers

- A 1977 3rd round draft pick
August 5, 1977
To Buffalo Braves

- A 1978 3rd round draft pick as compensation
To Detroit Pistons

- The right to sign Don Adams as a veteran free agent
September 1, 1977
To Buffalo Braves

- Tiny Archibald
To New Jersey Nets

- George Johnson, a 1978 1st round draft pick & a 1979 1st round draft pick.
September 1, 1977
To Buffalo Braves

- The right to sign Mike Bantom as a veteran free agent
To New Jersey Nets

- A future 4th round draft pick as compensation
September 1, 1977
To Buffalo Braves

- Billy Knight
To Indiana Pacers

- Adrian Dantley & Mike Bantom
September 2, 1977
To Buffalo Braves

- A 1979 1st round draft pick
To Milwaukee Bucks

- John Gianelli
September 7, 1977
To Buffalo Braves

- Cash considerations
To Los Angeles Lakers

- Ernie DiGregorio
September 13, 1977
To Buffalo Braves

- Bill Willoughby
To Atlanta Hawks

- A 1978 2nd round draft pick
October 3, 1977
To Buffalo Braves

- The right to sign Wil Jones as a veteran free agent
To Indiana Pacers

- A 1980 2nd round draft pick as compensation
October 6, 1977
To Buffalo Braves

- The right to sign Ted McClain as a veteran free agent
To Denver Nuggets

- A 1978 3rd round draft pick as compensation
October 17, 1977
To Buffalo Braves

- Gary Brokaw
To Cleveland Cavaliers

- Future considerations
October 18, 1977
To Buffalo Braves

- A 1978 3rd round draft pick
To Indiana Pacers

- Johnny Neumann
November 23, 1977
To Buffalo Braves

- Marvin Barnes and a 1978 2nd & 4th round draft picks
To Detroit Pistons

- Gus Gerard, John Shumate & a 1979 1st round draft pick
January 31, 1978
To Buffalo Braves

- A 1978 3rd round draft pick
To Philadelphia 76ers

- Ted McClain

=== Free agents ===
==== Additions ====
Player	Signed	Former team
Mike Bantom	September 1	New Jersey Nets
Jim McDaniels	September 20	Kentucky Colonels (ABA)
Wil Jones	October 3	Indiana Pacers
Ted McClain	October 6	Denver Nuggets
Scott Lloyd	December 8	Milwaukee Bucks
Mike Glenn	December 14	Chicago Bulls
Bird Averitt	January 31	New Jersey Nets
Larry McNeill	February 2	Golden State Warriors
Eddie Owens	March 8	Rochester Zeniths(AABA)

==== Subtractions ====
Player	Left	New team
Don Adams	free agency, August 5	Detroit Pistons
Fred Foster	waived, September 11	Retired
Bird Averitt	contract sold, September 16	New Jersey Nets
Larry Johnson	waived, November 14 signed as free agent, November 26 waived, December 8	(Japan) Matsushita Denki
Gary Brokaw	waived, December 14	Iona College (head coach)
Jim McDaniels	waived, February 2	Retired
