= 1977–78 Boston Celtics season =

NBA basketball team season

- Head coach: Tom Heinsohn; Tom Sanders
- General manager: Red Auerbach
- Owner: Irv Levin
- Arena: Boston Garden; Hartford Civic Center

Results
- Record: 32–50 (.390)
- Place: Division: 3rd (Atlantic); Conference: 8th (Eastern)
- Playoff finish: Did not qualify
- Stats at Basketball Reference

Local media
- Television: WBZ-TV (Len Berman, Bob Cousy)
- Radio: WBZ (Johnny Most, Bob Lobel)

The 1977–78 Boston Celtics season was the 32nd season of the Boston Celtics in the National Basketball Association (NBA) and was linked to the Buffalo Braves season. While the Braves were struggling on the court, their owner John Y. Brown brokered a deal to take over the legendary Celtics franchise. Celtics owner Irv Levin wanted to move the franchise to California; however, the NBA would not allow him to take the cornerstone franchise out of Boston.

NBA lawyer and future commissioner David Stern offered a compromise in which Levin and Brown would swap franchises, so that Levin could take over the Braves and move them to San Diego. Eventually, the owners of the 22 franchises voted 21–1 to approve the deal, and the Braves moved from Buffalo to San Diego (where they were renamed the Clippers). The deal also included a seven-player trade in which the Celtics acquired Nate Archibald, Billy Knight and Marvin Barnes in exchange for Freeman Williams, Kevin Kunnert, Kermit Washington and Sidney Wicks. The Braves would not request a draft pick in the deal, allowing the Celtics to retain the draft rights to future Hall of Famer Larry Bird.

Coincidentally, the Braves played their last game of the season in Boston. It was one of only three seasons from 1951 to 1993 that the Celtics finished with a losing record. This was the 16th and final season for the legendary John Havlicek. Nobody has played more seasons for the Celtics than Havlicek.

== Draft picks ==
This table only displays picks through two rounds.

Round	Pick	Player	Position	Nationality	College
1	12	Cedric Maxwell	SF	United States	Charlotte

== Roster ==
Boston Celtics roster
Players

Pos.	No.	Player	Height	Weight	DOB	From
G	44	Dave Bing	6 ft 3 in (1.91 m)	180 lb (82 kg)		Syracuse
F	31	Tom Boswell	6 ft 9 in (2.06 m)	220 lb (100 kg)		South Carolina
G	12	Don Chaney	6 ft 5 in (1.96 m)	210 lb (95 kg)		Houston
C	18	Dave Cowens	6 ft 9 in (2.06 m)	230 lb (104 kg)		Florida State
G	7	Ernie DiGregorio	6 ft 0 in (1.83 m)	180 lb (82 kg)		Providence
G/F	17	John Havlicek	6 ft 5 in (1.96 m)	203 lb (92 kg)		Ohio State
F	30	Cedric Maxwell	6 ft 8 in (2.03 m)	205 lb (93 kg)		Charlotte
F	41	Curtis Rowe	6 ft 7 in (2.01 m)	225 lb (102 kg)		UCLA
G	27	Kevin Stacom	6 ft 3 in (1.91 m)	185 lb (84 kg)		Providence
F	26	Kermit Washington	6 ft 8 in (2.03 m)	230 lb (104 kg)		American
G	10	Jo Jo White	6 ft 3 in (1.91 m)	190 lb (86 kg)		Kansas
F	12	Sidney Wicks	6 ft 8 in (2.03 m)	225 lb (102 kg)		UCLA

Coaches
Head coach
- Tom Sanders
Assistant(s)
- K. C. Jones

Legend
- (DP) Unsigned draft pick
- (FA) Free agent
- (S) Suspended
- Injured

== Regular season ==
=== Season standings ===
Atlantic Division	W	L	PCT	GB	Home	Road	Div
y-Philadelphia 76ers	55	27	.671	–	37–4	18–23	14–2
x-New York Knicks	43	39	.524	12	29–12	14–27	7–9
Boston Celtics	32	50	.390	23	24–17	8–33	8–8
Buffalo Braves	27	55	.329	28	20–21	7–34	7–9
New Jersey Nets	24	58	.293	31	18–23	6–35	4–12

#	Eastern Conference				
#	Team	W	L	PCT	GB
1	z-Philadelphia 76ers	55	27	.671	–
2	y-San Antonio Spurs	52	30	.634	3
3	x-Washington Bullets	44	38	.537	11
4	x-Cleveland Cavaliers	43	39	.524	12
5	x-New York Knicks	43	39	.524	12
6	x-Atlanta Hawks	41	41	.500	14
7	New Orleans Jazz	39	43	.476	16
8	Boston Celtics	32	50	.390	23
9	Houston Rockets	28	54	.341	27
10	Buffalo Braves	27	55	.329	28
11	New Jersey Nets	24	58	.293	31
