= 1977–78 San Antonio Spurs season =

- Division champions
- Head coach: Doug Moe
- General manager: John Begzos
- Owner: Angelo Drossos
- Arena: HemisFair Arena

Results
- Record: 52–30 (.634)
- Place: Division: 1st (Central); Conference: 2nd (Eastern)
- Playoff finish: Conference semifinals (lost to Bullets 2–4)
- Stats at Basketball Reference

Local media
- Television: KMOL
- Radio: WOAI

The 1977–78 San Antonio Spurs season was the second in the NBA, the 5th in San Antonio, and the 11th as a franchise. While George Gervin was lighting up the scoreboard with his first point title, the Spurs won the Central Division with a 52–30 record. In the playoffs the Spurs would be stunned in 6 games by the eventual champion Washington Bullets In the series, Gervin averaged 33.2 points per game.

== Draft picks ==
Round	Pick	Player	Position	Nationality	College
2	37	Jeff Wilkins	C/PF	United States	Illinois State
3	59	Dan Henderson		United States	Arkansas State
4	81	Matt Hicks		United States	Northern Illinois
5	103	Scott Sims	G	United States	Missouri
6	125	Bruce Buckley		United States	North Carolina
7	145	Richard Robinson		United States	New Mexico
8	164	Jerome Gladney		United States	Arizona

== Roster ==
1977–78 San Antonio Spurs roster
Players

Pos.	No.	Player	Height	Weight	DOB	From
F	30	Allan Bristow	6 ft 7 in (2.01 m)	210 lb (95 kg)		Virginia Tech
G	10	Louie Dampier	6 ft 0 in (1.83 m)	170 lb (77 kg)		Kentucky
F/C	25	Coby Dietrick	6 ft 10 in (2.08 m)	220 lb (100 kg)		San José State
G	12	Mike Gale	6 ft 4 in (1.93 m)	185 lb (84 kg)		Elizabeth City State
G/F	44	George Gervin	6 ft 7 in (2.01 m)	180 lb (82 kg)		Eastern Michigan
C	23	Mike Green	6 ft 10 in (2.08 m)	200 lb (91 kg)		Louisiana Tech
G	22	George Karl	6 ft 2 in (1.88 m)	185 lb (84 kg)		North Carolina
F	35	Larry Kenon	6 ft 9 in (2.06 m)	205 lb (93 kg)		Memphis
G	1	Mo Layton	6 ft 1 in (1.85 m)	180 lb (82 kg)		USC
F	53	Mark Olberding	6 ft 8 in (2.03 m)	225 lb (102 kg)		Minnesota
F/C	5	Billy Paultz	6 ft 11 in (2.11 m)	235 lb (107 kg)		St. John's
G	13	James Silas	6 ft 1 in (1.85 m)	180 lb (82 kg)		Stephen F. Austin

Coaches
Head coach
- Doug Moe (North Carolina)
Assistant(s)
- Bob Bass (Oklahoma Baptist)

Legend
- (DP) Unsigned draft pick
- (FA) Free agent
- (S) Suspended
- Injured

== Regular season ==
George Gervin and David Thompson of the Denver Nuggets would battle all season for the NBA scoring title. On the final day of the season, Thompson would take the lead by scoring 73 points in an afternoon game against the Detroit Pistons. That night, Gervin needed 58 points against the Jazz in New Orleans. Gervin got to a good start by scoring 20 points in the 1st Quarter. In the 2nd, Gervin set a single period record with 33 points. Early on in the 3rd, Gervin would score his 58 points on the way to 63 points, capturing the scoring title. While Gervin was lighting up the scoreboard, the Spurs won the Central Division with a 52–30 record.

=== Season standings ===
Central Division	W	L	PCT	GB	Home	Road	Div
y-San Antonio Spurs	52	30	.634	–	32–9	20–21	15–5
x-Washington Bullets	44	38	.537	8	29–12	15–26	14–6
x-Cleveland Cavaliers	43	39	.524	9	27–14	16–25	9–11
x-Atlanta Hawks	41	41	.500	11	29–12	12–29	8–12
New Orleans Jazz	39	43	.476	13	27–14	12–29	8–12
Houston Rockets	28	54	.341	24	21-20	7-34	6–14

#	Eastern Conference				
#	Team	W	L	PCT	GB
1	z-Philadelphia 76ers	55	27	.671	–
2	y-San Antonio Spurs	52	30	.634	3
3	x-Washington Bullets	44	38	.537	11
4	x-Cleveland Cavaliers	43	39	.524	12
5	x-New York Knicks	43	39	.524	12
6	x-Atlanta Hawks	41	41	.500	14
7	New Orleans Jazz	39	43	.476	16
8	Boston Celtics	32	50	.390	23
9	Houston Rockets	28	54	.341	27
10	Buffalo Braves	27	55	.329	28
11	New Jersey Nets	24	58	.293	31

z – clinched division title
y – clinched division title
x – clinched playoff spot

== Playoffs ==
1978 playoff game log
Conference semifinals: 2–4 (home: 2–1; road: 0–3)

Game	Date	Team	Score	High points	High rebounds	High assists	Location Attendance	Series
1	April 16	Washington	W 114–103	George Gervin (35)	Larry Kenon (9)	Gervin, Kenon (5)	HemisFair Arena; 9,669	1–0
2	April 18	Washington	L 117–121	George Gervin (46)	Larry Kenon (8)	Larry Kenon (6)	HemisFair Arena; 9,871	1–1
3	April 21	@ Washington	L 105–118	George Gervin (33)	Larry Kenon (9)	Larry Kenon (4)	Capital Centre; 17,417	1–2
4	April 23	@ Washington	L 95–98	George Gervin (35)	Billy Paultz (8)	Mike Gale (7)	Capital Centre; 13,459	1–3
5	April 25	Washington	W 116–105	George Gervin (27)	Larry Kenon (14)	Louie Dampier (6)	HemisFair Arena; 9,709	2–3
6	April 28	@ Washington	L 100–103	Mark Olberding (24)	Green, Paultz (9)	Mike Gale (9)	Capital Centre; 19,035	2–4

1978 schedule

== Player statistics ==
=== Ragular season ===
Player	POS	GP	GS	MP	REB	AST	STL	BLK	PTS	MPG	RPG	APG	SPG	BPG	PPG
George Gervin	SG	82	82	2,857	420	302	136	110	2,232	34.8	5.1	3.7	1.7	1.3	27.2
Louie Dampier	PG	82		2,037	122	285	87	13	748	24.8	1.5	3.5	1.1	.2	9.1
Allan Bristow	SF	82		1,481	257	194	69	4	666	18.1	3.1	2.4	.8	.0	8.1
Larry Kenon	SF	81		2,869	773	268	115	24	1,672	35.4	9.5	3.3	1.4	.3	20.6
Billy Paultz	C	80		2,479	675	213	42	194	1,266	31.0	8.4	2.7	.5	2.4	15.8
Coby Dietrick	PF	79		1,876	358	217	81	55	589	23.7	4.5	2.7	1.0	.7	7.5
Mark Olberding	PF	79		1,773	373	131	45	26	646	22.4	4.7	1.7	.6	.3	8.2
Mike Gale	SG	70		2,091	223	376	159	25	637	29.9	3.2	5.4	2.3	.4	9.1
Mike Green^{†}	C	63		1,132	304	66	24	87	476	18.0	4.8	1.0	.4	1.4	7.6
Mo Layton	PG	41		498	32	108	21	4	182	12.1	.8	2.6	.5	.1	4.4
James Silas	PG	37		311	23	38	11	1	146	8.4	.6	1.0	.3	.0	3.9
Jim Eakins^{†}	C	16		251	46	17	3	10	89	15.7	2.9	1.1	.2	.6	5.6
Scott Sims	PG	12		95	13	20	3	0	30	7.9	1.1	1.7	.3	.0	2.5
George Karl	PG	4		30	5	5	1	0	6	7.5	1.3	1.3	.3	.0	1.5

- ^{†} Denotes player spent time with another team in the season. Stats reflect time with the Spurs only.

=== Playoffs ===
Player	POS	GP	GS	MP	REB	AST	STL	BLK	PTS	MPG	RPG	APG	SPG	BPG	PPG
George Gervin	SG	6		227	34	19	6	16	199	37.8	5.7	3.2	1.0	2.7	33.2
Mike Gale	SG	6		201	25	31	7	4	52	33.5	4.2	5.2	1.2	.7	8.7
Larry Kenon	SF	6		200	55	22	5	2	106	33.3	9.2	3.7	.8	.3	17.7
Billy Paultz	C	6		191	41	14	5	5	69	31.8	6.8	2.3	.8	.8	11.5
Mike Green	C	6		174	44	11	5	16	65	29.0	7.3	1.8	.8	2.7	10.8
Mark Olberding	PF	6		152	30	14	6	6	63	25.3	5.0	2.3	1.0	1.0	10.5
Louie Dampier	PG	6		129	7	15	4	2	35	21.5	1.2	2.5	.7	.3	5.8
Coby Dietrick	PF	6		96	25	4	5	5	29	16.0	4.2	.7	.8	.8	4.8
Allan Bristow	SF	5		51	11	7	2	0	22	10.2	2.2	1.4	.4	.0	4.4
James Silas	PG	3		19	0	1	1	0	7	6.3	.0	.3	.3	.0	2.3

== Awards and honors ==
- George Gervin, All-NBA First Team
