= 1977–78 Cleveland Cavaliers season =

NBA professional basketball team season

- Head coach: Bill Fitch
- Arena: Coliseum at Richfield

Results
- Record: 43–39 (.524)
- Place: Division: 3rd (Central); Conference: 4th (Eastern)
- Playoff finish: East First Round (eliminated 0–2)
- Stats at Basketball Reference

Local media
- Television: WJKW
- Radio: WWWE

The 1977–78 Cleveland Cavaliers season was the eighth season of the franchise in the National Basketball Association (NBA). The Cavs finished the season 43–39 and were eliminated in the playoffs by the New York Knicks. The franchise would not make the playoffs until 1985.

== Roster ==
1977–78 Cleveland Cavaliers roster
Players

Pos.	No.	Player	Height	Weight	DOB	From
PF	52	Jim Brewer	6 ft 9 in (2.06 m)	210 lb (95 kg)		Minnesota
SG	34	Austin Carr	6 ft 4 in (1.93 m)	200 lb (91 kg)		Notre Dame
C	22	Jim Chones	6 ft 11 in (2.11 m)	220 lb (100 kg)		Marquette
PG	11	Walt Frazier	6 ft 4 in (1.93 m)	200 lb (91 kg)		Southern Illinois
PF	24	John Lambert	6 ft 10 in (2.08 m)	225 lb (102 kg)		USC
SF	21	Campy Russell	6 ft 8 in (2.03 m)	215 lb (98 kg)		Michigan
SG	7	Bingo Smith	6 ft 5 in (1.96 m)	195 lb (88 kg)		Tulsa
C	3	Elmore Smith	7 ft 0 in (2.13 m)	250 lb (113 kg)		Kentucky State
SG	10	Dick Snyder	6 ft 5 in (1.96 m)	207 lb (94 kg)		Davidson
PG	14	Foots Walker	6 ft 0 in (1.83 m)	184 lb (83 kg)		West Georgia

Coaches
Head coach
- Bill Fitch
Assistant(s)
- Jimmy Rodgers

Legend
- (DP) Unsigned draft pick
- (FA) Free agent
- (S) Suspended
- Injured

=== Season standings ===
Central Division	W	L	PCT	GB	Home	Road	Div
y-San Antonio Spurs	52	30	.634	–	32–9	20–21	15–5
x-Washington Bullets	44	38	.537	8	29–12	15–26	14–6
x-Cleveland Cavaliers	43	39	.524	9	27–14	16–25	9–11
x-Atlanta Hawks	41	41	.500	11	29–12	12–29	8–12
New Orleans Jazz	39	43	.476	13	27–14	12–29	8–12
Houston Rockets	28	54	.341	24	21-20	7-34	6–14

#	Eastern Conference				
#	Team	W	L	PCT	GB
1	z-Philadelphia 76ers	55	27	.671	–
2	y-San Antonio Spurs	52	30	.634	3
3	x-Washington Bullets	44	38	.537	11
4	x-Cleveland Cavaliers	43	39	.524	12
5	x-New York Knicks	43	39	.524	12
6	x-Atlanta Hawks	41	41	.500	14
7	New Orleans Jazz	39	43	.476	16
8	Boston Celtics	32	50	.390	23
9	Houston Rockets	28	54	.341	27
10	Buffalo Braves	27	55	.329	28
11	New Jersey Nets	24	58	.293	31

Notes

- z, y – division champions
- x – clinched playoff spot

== Game log ==
1977–78 game log
Total: 43–39 (Home: 27–14; Road: 16–25)
October: 3–3 (home: 1–2; road: 2–1)

Game	Date	Team	Score	High points	High rebounds	High assists	Location Attendance	Record
3	October 22, 1977	@ Atlanta	L 101–107				The Omni; 7,894	1–2

November: 10–2 (home: 5–0; road: 5–2)

Game	Date	Team	Score	High points	High rebounds	High assists	Location Attendance	Record

December: 5–10 (home: 5–4; road: 0–6)

Game	Date	Team	Score	High points	High rebounds	High assists	Location Attendance	Record
24	December 10, 1977	Atlanta	W 102–87				Coliseum at Richfield; 6,766	14–10

January: 4–9 (home: 3–3; road: 1–6)

Game	Date	Team	Score	High points	High rebounds	High assists	Location Attendance	Record
42	January 22, 1978	Atlanta	W 93–89				Coliseum at Richfield; 10,585	21–21

February: 8–7 (home: 5–2; road: 3–5)

Game	Date	Team	Score	High points	High rebounds	High assists	Location Attendance	Record

March: 8–8 (home: 5–3; road: 3–5)

Game	Date	Team	Score	High points	High rebounds	High assists	Location Attendance	Record

April: 5–0 (home: 3–0; road: 2–0)

Game	Date	Team	Score	High points	High rebounds	High assists	Location Attendance	Record
81	April 7, 1978	@ Atlanta	W 111–109				The Omni; 9,631	42–39

1977–78 schedule

== Playoffs ==
1978 playoff game log
First Round: 0–2 (home: 0–1; road: 0–1)

Game	Date	Team	Score	High points	High rebounds	High assists	Location Attendance	Series
1	April 12	New York	L 114–132	Campy Russell (23)	Elmore Smith (12)	Foots Walker (6)	Richfield Coliseum; 19,739	0–1
2	April 14	@ New York	L 107–109	Campy Russell (32)	Campy Russell (8)	Campy Russell (6)	Madison Square Garden; 18,965	0–2

1978 schedule
