= 1977–78 New York Knicks season =

Season of National Basketball Association team the New York Knicks

- Head coach: Willis Reed
- General manager: Eddie Donovan
- Owners: Gulf+Western
- Arena: Madison Square Garden

Results
- Record: 43–39 (.524)
- Place: Division: 2nd (Atlantic); Conference: 5th (Eastern)
- Playoff finish: East Semifinals (lost to 76ers 0–4)
- Stats at Basketball Reference

Local media
- Television: WOR-TV
- Radio: WNEW

The 1977–78 New York Knicks season was the 32nd season for the team in the National Basketball Association (NBA). The Knicks finished the regular season in second place in the Atlantic Division with a 43–39 win–loss record and qualified for the NBA playoffs. In the first round of the 1978 Playoffs, New York defeated the Cleveland Cavaliers, 2–0, to advance to the Eastern Conference Semifinals. There, the Knicks lost to the Philadelphia 76ers in a four-game sweep.

== Draft picks ==
Note: This is not an extensive list; it only covers the first and second rounds, and any other players picked by the franchise that played at least one game in the league.

Round	Pick	Player	Position	Nationality	School/Club team
1	10	Ray Williams	G	United States	Minnesota
2	26	Glen Gondrezick	G/F	United States	UNLV
2	32	Toby Knight	F	United States	Notre Dame
4	76	Steve Hayes	C	United States	Idaho State

== Roster ==
New York Knicks roster
Players

Pos.	No.	Player	Height	Weight	DOB	From
G	9	Butch Beard	6 ft 3 in (1.91 m)	185 lb (84 kg)		Louisville
G	14	Ticky Burden	6 ft 2 in (1.88 m)	185 lb (84 kg)		Utah
PG	35	Jim Cleamons	6 ft 3 in (1.91 m)	185 lb (84 kg)		Ohio State
F	44	Glen Gondrezick	6 ft 6 in (1.98 m)	218 lb (99 kg)		UNLV
F	42	Spencer Haywood	6 ft 8 in (2.03 m)	225 lb (102 kg)		Detroit Mercy
F	18	Phil Jackson	6 ft 8 in (2.03 m)	220 lb (100 kg)		North Dakota
F	43	Toby Knight	6 ft 2 in (1.88 m)	210 lb (95 kg)		Notre Dame
F/C	11	Bob McAdoo	6 ft 9 in (2.06 m)	210 lb (95 kg)		North Carolina
F	5	Jim McMillian	6 ft 5 in (1.96 m)	215 lb (98 kg)		Columbia
G	15	Earl Monroe	6 ft 3 in (1.91 m)	185 lb (84 kg)		Winston-Salem State
F	8	Lonnie Shelton	6 ft 8 in (2.03 m)	240 lb (109 kg)		Oregon State
G	13	Ray Williams	6 ft 3 in (1.91 m)	188 lb (85 kg)		Minnesota

Coaches
Head coach
- (United States) Willis Reed
Assistant(s)
- (United States) Dick McGuire (Dartmouth)
- (United States) Nat Frazier (Tuskegee)

Legend
- (DP) Unsigned draft pick
- (FA) Free agent
- (S) Suspended
- Injured

== Regular season ==
=== Season standings ===
Atlantic Division	W	L	PCT	GB	Home	Road	Div
y-Philadelphia 76ers	55	27	.671	–	37–4	18–23	14–2
x-New York Knicks	43	39	.524	12	29–12	14–27	7–9
Boston Celtics	32	50	.390	23	24–17	8–33	8–8
Buffalo Braves	27	55	.329	28	20–21	7–34	7–9
New Jersey Nets	24	58	.293	31	18–23	6–35	4–12

#	Eastern Conference				
#	Team	W	L	PCT	GB
1	z-Philadelphia 76ers	55	27	.671	–
2	y-San Antonio Spurs	52	30	.634	3
3	x-Washington Bullets	44	38	.537	11
4	x-Cleveland Cavaliers	43	39	.524	12
5	x-New York Knicks	43	39	.524	12
6	x-Atlanta Hawks	41	41	.500	14
7	New Orleans Jazz	39	43	.476	16
8	Boston Celtics	32	50	.390	23
9	Houston Rockets	28	54	.341	27
10	Buffalo Braves	27	55	.329	28
11	New Jersey Nets	24	58	.293	31

z – clinched division title
y – clinched division title
x – clinched playoff spot

== Game log ==
=== Regular season ===
1977–78 game log
Total: 44–38 (home: 22–19; road: 21–20)
October: 3–2 (home: 3–1; road: 0–1)

Game	Date	Team	Score	High points	High rebounds	High assists	Location Attendance	Record
2	October 22, 1977; 8:05 p.m. EDT	Washington	W 141–115	Monroe (22)	Shelton (9)	McAdoo (8)	Madison Square Garden; 15,261	2–0

November: 8–7 (home: 6–1; road: 2–6)

Game	Date	Team	Score	High points	High rebounds	High assists	Location Attendance	Record
14	November 18, 1977; 8:05 p.m. EST	@ Washington	L 103–123	Haywood (20)	McAdoo (13)	Beard (10)	Capital Centre; 17,242	8–6

December: 8–6 (home: 5–3; road: 3–3)

Game	Date	Team	Score	High points	High rebounds	High assists	Location Attendance	Record

January: 7–8 (home: 4–2; road: 3–6)

Game	Date	Team	Score	High points	High rebounds	High assists	Location Attendance	Record

February: 6–5 (home: 5–1; road: 1–4)

Game	Date	Team	Score	High points	High rebounds	High assists	Location Attendance	Record
All-Star Break

March: 7–10 (home: 5–3; road: 2–7)

Game	Date	Team	Score	High points	High rebounds	High assists	Location Attendance	Record
76	March 30, 1978; 8:35 p.m. EST	Washington	L 108–123	Williams (26)	Knight (8)	Williams (9)	Madison Square Garden; 12,702	38–38

April: 4–1 (home: 1–1; road: 3–0)

Game	Date	Team	Score	High points	High rebounds	High assists	Location Attendance	Record
78	April 2, 1978; 1:45 p.m. EST	@ Washington	W 114–109	McAdoo (25)	Knight (11)	Monroe (10)	Capital Centre; 7,193	40–38

1977–78 schedule

== Playoffs ==
1978 playoff game log
First Round: 2–0 (home: 1–0; road: 1–0)

Game	Date	Team	Score	High points	High rebounds	High assists	Location Attendance	Series
1	April 12	@ Cleveland	W 132–114	Bob McAdoo (41)	Spencer Haywood (8)	Ray Williams (6)	Richfield Coliseum; 19,739	1–0
2	April 14	Cleveland	W 109–107	McAdoo, Haywood (27)	Bob McAdoo (12)	Ray Williams (10)	Madison Square Garden; 18,965	2–0

Conference Semifinals: 0–4 (home: 0–2; road: 0–2)

Game	Date	Team	Score	High points	High rebounds	High assists	Location Attendance	Series
1	April 24	@ Philadelphia	L 90–130	Ray Williams (24)	Bob McAdoo (13)	Bob McAdoo (6)	Spectrum; 13,011	0–1
2	April 27	@ Philadelphia	L 100–119	Ray Williams (24)	three players tied (6)	Bob McAdoo (6)	Spectrum; 15,853	0–2
3	April 30	Philadelphia	L 126–137	Bob McAdoo (29)	Lonnie Shelton (14)	Butch Beard (8)	Madison Square Garden; 16,307	0–3
4	May 1	Philadelphia	L 107–112	Bob McAdoo (24)	Bob McAdoo (14)	McAdoo, Williams (4)	Madison Square Garden; 15,457	0–4

1978 schedule
