= 1977–78 New Jersey Nets season =

NBA professional basketball team season

- Head coach: Kevin Loughery
- Arena: Rutgers Athletic Center

Results
- Record: 24–58 (.293)
- Place: Division: 5th (Atlantic); Conference: 11th (Eastern)
- Playoff finish: Did not qualify
- Stats at Basketball Reference

Local media
- Television: WOR-TV; Cablevision Sports 3
- Radio: WMCA

The 1977–78 New Jersey Nets season was the Nets' 11th in franchise history, their second in the NBA, and their first in New Jersey, following their relocation from nearby Long Island.

== Draft picks ==
Round	Pick	Player	Position	Nationality	College
1	7	Bernard King	SF	United States	Tennessee
4	67	Bob Elmore		United States	Wichita State
5	89	Gerald Cunningham		United States	Kentucky State
6	111	Mark Crow		United States	Duke
7	132	Scott Conant		United States	Newberry College
8	152	Ralph Drollinger	C	United States	UCLA

This would become the only NBA draft that the Nets would participate in under the New York Nets name. Following this draft's conclusion, the team would move to nearby New Jersey and play there up until 2012, where they would move to Brooklyn to become the Brooklyn Nets since then.

== Roster ==
1977–78 New Jersey Nets roster
Players

Pos.	No.	Player	Height	Weight	DOB	From
PF	21	Tim Bassett	6 ft 8 in (2.03 m)	225 lb (102 kg)	1951-04-01	Georgia
C	35	Kim Hughes	6 ft 11 in (2.11 m)	220 lb (100 kg)	1952-06-04	Wisconsin
C	52	George Johnson	6 ft 11 in (2.11 m)	205 lb (93 kg)	1948-12-18	Dillard
PG	15	Eddie Jordan	6 ft 1 in (1.85 m)	170 lb (77 kg)	1955-01-29	Rutgers
SF	22	Bernard King	6 ft 7 in (2.01 m)	205 lb (93 kg)	1956-12-04	Tennessee
SG	11	Louie Nelson	6 ft 3 in (1.91 m)	190 lb (86 kg)	1951-05-28	Washington
SF	54	Howard Porter	6 ft 8 in (2.03 m)	220 lb (100 kg)	1948-08-31	Villanova
PG	1	Kevin Porter	6 ft 0 in (1.83 m)	170 lb (77 kg)	1950-04-17	Saint Francis (PA)
SF	20	Jan van Breda Kolff	6 ft 7 in (2.01 m)	195 lb (88 kg)	1951-12-16	Vanderbilt
PF	42	Wilson Washington	6 ft 9 in (2.06 m)	227 lb (103 kg)	1955-08-03	Old Dominion
SG	23	John Williamson	6 ft 2 in (1.88 m)	185 lb (84 kg)	1951-11-10	New Mexico State

Coaches
Head coach
- Kevin Loughery
Assistant(s)
- Rod Thorn

Legend
- (DP) Unsigned draft pick
- (FA) Free agent
- (S) Suspended
- Injured

Roster

== Regular season ==
=== Season standings ===
Atlantic Division	W	L	PCT	GB	Home	Road	Div
y-Philadelphia 76ers	55	27	.671	–	37–4	18–23	14–2
x-New York Knicks	43	39	.524	12	29–12	14–27	7–9
Boston Celtics	32	50	.390	23	24–17	8–33	8–8
Buffalo Braves	27	55	.329	28	20–21	7–34	7–9
New Jersey Nets	24	58	.293	31	18–23	6–35	4–12

#	Eastern Conference				
#	Team	W	L	PCT	GB
1	z-Philadelphia 76ers	55	27	.671	–
2	y-San Antonio Spurs	52	30	.634	3
3	x-Washington Bullets	44	38	.537	11
4	x-Cleveland Cavaliers	43	39	.524	12
5	x-New York Knicks	43	39	.524	12
6	x-Atlanta Hawks	41	41	.500	14
7	New Orleans Jazz	39	43	.476	16
8	Boston Celtics	32	50	.390	23
9	Houston Rockets	28	54	.341	27
10	Buffalo Braves	27	55	.329	28
11	New Jersey Nets	24	58	.293	31

z – clinched division title
y – clinched division title
x – clinched playoff spot

== Awards and records ==
- Bernard King, NBA All-Rookie First Team 1st Team
