= 1977–78 New Orleans Jazz season =

NBA professional basketball team season

- Head coach: Elgin Baylor
- Arena: Louisiana Superdome

Results
- Record: 39–43 (.476)
- Place: Division: 5th (Central); Conference: 7th (Eastern)
- Playoff finish: Did not qualify

Local media
- Television: WGNO
- Radio: WWL

The 1977–78 New Orleans Jazz season was the team's fourth in the NBA. They began the season hoping to improve upon their 35–47 output from the previous season. They started the season going 6-2 and later in the season with a 16–24 record, the team managed to go on a 10-game winning streak and we're still in a playoff hunt with a 36–37 record before a 6-game losing streak dashed any playoff hopes for the fourth straight season, but still they finished the season with a 3-game winning streak and improved their 35-47 one year earlier by four wins, finishing 39–43.

== Roster ==
1977–78 New Orleans Jazz roster
Players

| Pos. | No. | Player | Height | Weight | DOB | From |
|---|---|---|---|---|---|---|
| SG | 18 | Gus Bailey | 6 ft 5 in (1.96 m) | 185 lb (84 kg) | 1951-02-18 | UTEP |
| G | 4 | Freddie Boyd | 6 ft 2 in (1.88 m) | 180 lb (82 kg) | 1950-06-13 | Oregon State |
| G | 25 | Gail Goodrich | 6 ft 1 in (1.85 m) | 170 lb (77 kg) | 1943-04-23 | UCLA |
| F/C | 30 | Paul Griffin | 6 ft 9 in (2.06 m) | 205 lb (93 kg) | 1954-01-20 | Western Michigan |
| F | 23 | Aaron James | 6 ft 8 in (2.03 m) | 210 lb (95 kg) | 1952-10-05 | Grambling State |
| C | 53 | Rich Kelley | 7 ft 0 in (2.13 m) | 235 lb (107 kg) | 1953-03-23 | Stanford |
| G | 7 | Pete Maravich | 6 ft 5 in (1.96 m) | 197 lb (89 kg) | 1947-06-22 | LSU |
| G | 33 | Jim McElroy | 6 ft 3 in (1.91 m) | 190 lb (86 kg) | 1953-10-04 | Central Michigan |
| C | 31 | Joe C. Meriweather | 6 ft 10 in (2.08 m) | 215 lb (98 kg) | 1953-10-26 | Southern Illinois |
| F | 21 | Truck Robinson | 6 ft 7 in (2.01 m) | 225 lb (102 kg) | 1951-10-04 | Tennessee State |
| F | 12 | Fred Saunders | 6 ft 7 in (2.01 m) | 210 lb (95 kg) | 1951-06-13 | Syracuse |
| G | 13 | Donald Watts | 6 ft 1 in (1.85 m) | 175 lb (79 kg) | 1951-07-22 | Xavier (LA) |

Coaches
Head coach
- Elgin Baylor
Assistant(s)
- Bill Bertka

Legend
- (DP) Unsigned draft pick
- (FA) Free agent
- (S) Suspended
- Injured

== Regular season ==
=== Season standings ===
| Central Division | W | L | PCT | GB | Home | Road | Div |
|---|---|---|---|---|---|---|---|
| y-San Antonio Spurs | 52 | 30 | .634 | – | 32–9 | 20–21 | 15–5 |
| x-Washington Bullets | 44 | 38 | .537 | 8 | 29–12 | 15–26 | 14–6 |
| x-Cleveland Cavaliers | 43 | 39 | .524 | 9 | 27–14 | 16–25 | 9–11 |
| x-Atlanta Hawks | 41 | 41 | .500 | 11 | 29–12 | 12–29 | 8–12 |
| New Orleans Jazz | 39 | 43 | .476 | 13 | 27–14 | 12–29 | 8–12 |
| Houston Rockets | 28 | 54 | .341 | 24 | 21-20 | 7-34 | 6–14 |

| # | Eastern Conference | | | | |
| # | Team | W | L | PCT | GB |
|---|---|---|---|---|---|
| 1 | z-Philadelphia 76ers | 55 | 27 | .671 | – |
| 2 | y-San Antonio Spurs | 52 | 30 | .634 | 3 |
| 3 | x-Washington Bullets | 44 | 38 | .537 | 11 |
| 4 | x-Cleveland Cavaliers | 43 | 39 | .524 | 12 |
| 5 | x-New York Knicks | 43 | 39 | .524 | 12 |
| 6 | x-Atlanta Hawks | 41 | 41 | .500 | 14 |
| 7 | New Orleans Jazz | 39 | 43 | .476 | 16 |
| 8 | Boston Celtics | 32 | 50 | .390 | 23 |
| 9 | Houston Rockets | 28 | 54 | .341 | 27 |
| 10 | Buffalo Braves | 27 | 55 | .329 | 28 |
| 11 | New Jersey Nets | 24 | 58 | .293 | 31 |

z – clinched division title
y – clinched division title
x – clinched playoff spot

== Awards and records ==
- Pete Maravich, All-NBA Second Team
