= 1977–78 Houston Rockets season =

- Head coach: Tom Nissalke
- General manager: Ray Patterson
- Owner: Kenneth Schnitzer
- Arena: The Summit

Results
- Record: 28–54 (.341)
- Place: Division: 6th (Central); Conference: 9th (Eastern)
- Playoff finish: Did not qualify
- Stats at Basketball Reference

Local media
- Television: KHTV
- Radio: KXYZ

The 1977–78 Houston Rockets season was the Rockets' 11th season in the NBA and 7th season in the city of Houston.

== Roster ==
Houston Rockets roster
Players

Pos.	No.	Player	Height	Weight	DOB	From
F	30	Alonzo Bradley	6 ft 6 in (1.98 m)	190 lb (86 kg)		Texas Southern
G	10	Mike Dunleavy	6 ft 1 in (1.85 m)	180 lb (82 kg)		South Carolina
C	44	Kevin Kunnert	6 ft 9 in (2.06 m)	230 lb (104 kg)		Iowa
F	41	C. J. Kupec	6 ft 6 in (1.98 m)	220 lb (100 kg)		Michigan
PG	15	John Lucas	6 ft 3 in (1.91 m)	175 lb (79 kg)		Maryland
C	24	Moses Malone	6 ft 11 in (2.11 m)	235 lb (107 kg)		Petersburg High School
G	23	Calvin Murphy	5 ft 9 in (1.75 m)	165 lb (75 kg)		Niagara
G	14	Mike Newlin	6 ft 4 in (1.93 m)	200 lb (91 kg)		Utah
F	50	Robert Reid	6 ft 8 in (2.03 m)	205 lb (93 kg)		Saint Mary's
F	45	Rudy Tomjanovich (injured)	6 ft 8 in (2.03 m)	218 lb (99 kg)		Michigan

Coaches
Head coach
- Tom Nissalke

Legend
- (DP) Unsigned draft pick
- (FA) Free agent
- (S) Suspended
- Injured

== Regular season ==
=== Season standings ===
Central Division	W	L	PCT	GB	Home	Road	Div
y-San Antonio Spurs	52	30	.634	–	32–9	20–21	15–5
x-Washington Bullets	44	38	.537	8	29–12	15–26	14–6
x-Cleveland Cavaliers	43	39	.524	9	27–14	16–25	9–11
x-Atlanta Hawks	41	41	.500	11	29–12	12–29	8–12
New Orleans Jazz	39	43	.476	13	27–14	12–29	8–12
Houston Rockets	28	54	.341	24	21-20	7-34	6–14

#	Eastern Conference				
#	Team	W	L	PCT	GB
1	z-Philadelphia 76ers	55	27	.671	–
2	y-San Antonio Spurs	52	30	.634	3
3	x-Washington Bullets	44	38	.537	11
4	x-Cleveland Cavaliers	43	39	.524	12
5	x-New York Knicks	43	39	.524	12
6	x-Atlanta Hawks	41	41	.500	14
7	New Orleans Jazz	39	43	.476	16
8	Boston Celtics	32	50	.390	23
9	Houston Rockets	28	54	.341	27
10	Buffalo Braves	27	55	.329	28
11	New Jersey Nets	24	58	.293	31

z – clinched division title
y – clinched division title
x – clinched playoff spot
