= 1977–78 Washington Bullets season =

NBA professional basketball team season

- NBA champions
- Conference champions
- Head coach: Dick Motta
- General manager: Bob Ferry
- Owner: Abe Pollin
- Arena: Capital Centre

Results
- Record: 44–38 (.537)
- Place: Division: 2nd (Central); Conference: 3rd (Eastern)
- Playoff finish: NBA champions (Defeated SuperSonics 4–3)
- Stats at Basketball Reference

Local media
- Television: WDCA–TV 20 (Jim Karvellas, Mike Riordan)
- Radio: WTOP–AM 1500 (Frank Herzog)

The 1977–78 Washington Bullets season was the team's 17th season in the NBA and their 5th season in the city of Washington, D.C. It would prove to be their most successful season, as they would win their first and only NBA championship as of 2026. In the NBA Finals, they defeated the Seattle SuperSonics in seven games.

The Bullets got off to a slow start in the regular season, losing 6 of their first 10 games. On January 13, the Bullets beat the defending Champion Portland Trail Blazers to improve to 24–15, capping an 18–5 run over 23 games. Injuries would begin to have an effect on the team as the Bullets struggled, as they would lose 13 of their next 18 games. Hovering a few games above .500 for the rest of the season, the Bullets managed to make the playoffs with a 44–38 record. They hold the record for the lowest winning percentage (.537) of any NBA Championship winning team. The 1968–69 Boston Celtics, 1974–75 Golden State Warriors, 1976–77 Portland Trail Blazers, and 1994–95 Houston Rockets are the only other NBA championship teams to have won below 50 games in non-lockout seasons since 1958; all of them won more than 44 games.

== Offseason ==
=== NBA draft ===
Round	Pick	Player	Position	Nationality	College/HS/Club Team	Notes
1	4	Greg Ballard	F	United States	Oregon	from Atlanta
1	17	Bo Ellis	F	United States	Marquette	
2	39	Phil Walker	G	United States	Millersville	
3	57	Steve Puidokas	C	United States	Washington State	from Chicago
3	61	Jerry Schellenberg	F	United States	Wake Forest	
4	83	David Reavis	F	United States	Georgia	
5	105	Bruce Parkinson	G	United States	Purdue	
6	127	Ernie Wansley	C	United States	Virginia Tech	
7	147	Calvin Brown	G	United States	American	
8	166	Pat McKinley	F	United States	Towson State	

== Roster ==
1977–78 Washington Bullets roster
Players

Pos.	No.	Player	Height	Weight	DOB	From
SF	42	Greg Ballard	6 ft 7 in (2.01 m)	215 lb (98 kg)	1955-01-29	Oregon
SG	45	Phil Chenier	6 ft 3 in (1.91 m)	180 lb (82 kg)	1950-10-30	California
SF	10	Bob Dandridge	6 ft 6 in (1.98 m)	195 lb (88 kg)	1947-11-15	Norfolk State
SF	35	Kevin Grevey	6 ft 5 in (1.96 m)	210 lb (95 kg)	1953-05-12	Kentucky
PF	11	Elvin Hayes	6 ft 9 in (2.06 m)	235 lb (107 kg)	1945-11-17	Houston
PG	14	Tom Henderson	6 ft 3 in (1.91 m)	190 lb (86 kg)	1952-01-26	Hawaiʻi
SG	15	Charles Johnson	6 ft 0 in (1.83 m)	170 lb (77 kg)	1949-03-31	California
PF	25	Mitch Kupchak	6 ft 9 in (2.06 m)	230 lb (104 kg)	1954-05-24	North Carolina
C	44	Joe Pace	6 ft 10 in (2.08 m)	220 lb (100 kg)	1953-12-18	Coppin State
C	41	Wes Unseld	6 ft 7 in (2.01 m)	245 lb (111 kg)	1946-03-14	Louisville
SG	20	Phil Walker	6 ft 3 in (1.91 m)	180 lb (82 kg)	1956-03-120	Millersville
PG	32	Larry Wright	6 ft 1 in (1.85 m)	160 lb (73 kg)	1954-11-23	Grambling State

Coaches
Head coach
- Dick Motta
Assistant(s)
- Bernie Bickerstaff

Legend
- (DP) Unsigned draft pick
- (FA) Free agent
- (S) Suspended
- Injured

== Season standings ==
Central Division	W	L	PCT	GB	Home	Road	Div
y-San Antonio Spurs	52	30	.634	–	32–9	20–21	15–5
x-Washington Bullets	44	38	.537	8	29–12	15–26	14–6
x-Cleveland Cavaliers	43	39	.524	9	27–14	16–25	9–11
x-Atlanta Hawks	41	41	.500	11	29–12	12–29	8–12
New Orleans Jazz	39	43	.476	13	27–14	12–29	8–12
Houston Rockets	28	54	.341	24	21-20	7-34	6–14

#	Eastern Conference				
#	Team	W	L	PCT	GB
1	z-Philadelphia 76ers	55	27	.671	–
2	y-San Antonio Spurs	52	30	.634	3
3	x-Washington Bullets	44	38	.537	11
4	x-Cleveland Cavaliers	43	39	.524	12
5	x-New York Knicks	43	39	.524	12
6	x-Atlanta Hawks	41	41	.500	14
7	New Orleans Jazz	39	43	.476	16
8	Boston Celtics	32	50	.390	23
9	Houston Rockets	28	54	.341	27
10	Buffalo Braves	27	55	.329	28
11	New Jersey Nets	24	58	.293	31

=== Record vs. opponents ===
==== vs. Eastern Conference ====
vs. Atlantic Division

1977–78 NBA records
Team	BOS	BUF	NJN	NYK	PHI	Total
Atlanta	0–0	0–0	0–0	0–0	2–2	2–2
Cleveland	0–0	0–0	0–0	0–0	3–1	3–1
Houston	0–0	0–0	0–0	0–0	2–2	2–2
New Orleans	0–0	0–0	0–0	0–0	2–2	2–2
San Antonio	0–0	0–0	0–0	0–0	3–1	3–1
Washington	3–1	3–1	2–2	2–2	2–2	12–8

vs. Central Division

1977–78 NBA records
Team	ATL	CLE	HOU	NOJ	SAS	WSB	Total
Atlanta	—	0–0	0–0	0–0	0–0	1–3	1–3
Cleveland	0–0	—	0–0	0–0	0–0	2–2	2–2
Houston	0–0	0–0	—	0–0	0–0	1–3	1–3
New Orleans	0–0	0–0	0–0	—	0–0	0–4	0–4
San Antonio	0–0	0–0	0–0	0–0	—	2–2	2–2
Washington	3–1	2–2	3–1	4–0	2–2	—	14–6

==== vs. Western Conference ====
vs. Midwest Division

1977–78 NBA records
Team	CHI	DEN	DET	IND	KCK	MIL	Total
Atlanta	0–0	3–1	0–0	0–0	0–0	0–0	3–1
Cleveland	0–0	1–3	0–0	0–0	0–0	0–0	1–3
Houston	0–0	3–0	0–0	0–0	0–0	0–0	3–0
New Orleans	0–0	3–1	0–0	0–0	0–0	0–0	3–1
San Antonio	0–0	2–1	0–0	0–0	0–0	0–0	2–1
Washington	1–2	1–3	2–2	1–3	2–2	1–3	8–15

vs. Pacific Division

1977–78 NBA records
Team	GSW	LAL	PHO	POR	SEA	Total
Atlanta	0–0	0–0	0–0	0–0	1–2	1–2
Cleveland	0–0	0–0	0–0	0–0	1–3	1–3
Houston	0–0	0–0	0–0	0–0	4–0	4–0
New Orleans	0–0	0–0	0–0	0–0	2–2	2–2
San Antonio	0–0	0–0	0–0	0–0	2–2	2–2
Washington	2–2	2–2	2–2	1–2	3–1	10–9

== Game log ==
=== Regular season ===
1977–78 game log
Total: 44–38 (home: 22–19; road: 21–20)
October: 1–3 (home: 1–0; road: 0–3)

Game	Date	Team	Score	High points	High rebounds	High assists	Location Attendance	Record
1	October 21, 1977; 8:05 p.m. EDT	Detroit	W 117–109	Kupchak (29)	Dandridge, Unseld (9)	Henderson (12)	Capital Centre; 13,276	1–0
2	October 22, 1977; 8:05 p.m. EDT	@ New York	L 115–141	Hayes (26)	Hayes (14)	Henderson, Unseld, Wright (4)	Madison Square Garden; 15,261	1–1
3	October 28, 1977; 8:05 p.m. EDT	@ Indiana	L 127–136	Wright (43)	Unseld (15)	Henderson (9)	Market Square Arena; 12,542	1–2
4	October 29, 1977; 8:35 p.m. EDT	@ Kansas City	L 106–120	Wright (19)	Unseld (11)	Chenier, Henderson, Wright (5)	Kemper Arena; 9,220	1–3

November: 9–4 (home: 6–2; road: 3–2)

Game	Date	Team	Score	High points	High rebounds	High assists	Location Attendance	Record
5	November 4, 1977; 8:05 p.m. EST	Phoenix	W 113–96	Dandridge (24)	Hayes (14)	Henderson (10)	Capital Centre; 8,742	2–3
6	November 5, 1977; 9:05 p.m. EST	@ Houston	L 105–116	Wright (20)	Dandridge, Unseld (9)	Henderson, Unseld, Wright (3)	The Summit; 9,449	2–4
7	November 6, 1977; 8:35 p.m. EST	@ New Orleans	W 108–97	Dandridge, Hayes (21)	Hayes (20)	Wright (4)	Louisiana Superdome; 26,474	3–4
8	November 10, 1977; 8:05 p.m. EST	Milwaukee	L 103–106	Dandridge (25)	Hayes (13)	Unseld, Wright (6)	Capital Centre; 7,139	3–5
9	November 12, 1977; 8:05 p.m. EST	Philadelphia	W 116–98	Dandridge (28)	Hayes (16)	Wright (10)	Capital Centre; 18,355	4–5
10	November 13, 1977; 7:05 p.m. EST	@ Detroit	L 102–104	Hayes (29)	Hayes (16)	Henderson (8)	Cobo Arena; 5,149	4–6
11	November 15, 1977; 8:05 p.m. EST	Seattle	W 111–109	Hayes (22)	Hayes (14)	Unseld (6)	Capital Centre; 5,593	5–6
12	November 18, 1977; 8:05 p.m. EST	New York	W 123–103	Hayes (27)	Hayes (12)	Henderson (9)	Capital Centre; 17,242	6–6
13	November 19, 1977; 8:35 p.m. EST	@ Kansas City (at Omaha, Nebraska)	W 131–125 (OT)	Kupchak (32)	Dandridge (12)	Henderson (7)	Omaha Civic Auditorium; 6,534	7–6
14	November 21, 1977; 7:30 p.m. EST	@ Buffalo	W 114–97	Kupchak (21)	Dandridge (14)	Henderson (7)	Buffalo Memorial Auditorium; 6,125	8–6
15	November 22, 1977; 8:05 p.m. EST	Denver	L 114–119	Dandridge (29)	Hayes (12)	Wright (7)	Capital Centre; 8,363	8–7
16	November 26, 1977; 8:05 p.m. EST	Houston	W 93–91	Hayes (24)	Pace (10)	Dandridge (7)	Capital Centre; 18,387	9–7
17	November 30, 1977; 8:05 p.m. EST	San Antonio	W 116–105	Kupchak (26)	Unseld (15)	Unseld (10)	Capital Centre; 7,092	10–7

December: 10–6 (home: 6–1; road: 4–5)

Game	Date	Team	Score	High points	High rebounds	High assists	Location Attendance	Record
18	December 2, 1977; 9:05 p.m. EST	@ Milwaukee	W 108–95	Hayes (29)	Hayes (19)	Henderson (11)	MECCA Arena; 10,938	11–7
19	December 3, 1977; 8:05 p.m. EST	Boston	W 103–93	Dandridge (21)	Kupchak (12)	Dandridge (8)	Capital Centre; 18,424	12–7
20	December 4, 1977; 7:30 p.m. EST	@ Cleveland	W 100–94	Chenier (28)	Hayes (16)	Henderson (6)	Richfield Coliseum; 9,765	13–7
21	December 6, 1977; 8:30 p.m. EST	@ Chicago	L 108–116	Chenier, Hayes (22)	Unseld (12)	Dandridge, Unseld (5)	Chicago Stadium; 10,093	13–8
22	December 7, 1977; 8:05 p.m. EST	Cleveland	W 96–95	Dandridge (21)	Unseld (20)	Henderson (5)	Capital Centre; 7,627	14–8
23	December 9, 1977; 8:05 p.m. EST	New Orleans	W 101–97	Henderson (22)	Unseld (16)	Henderson (9)	Capital Centre; 10,292	15–8
24	December 11, 1977; 7:35 p.m. EST	New Jersey	L 95–106	Hayes (27)	Hayes (20)	Dandridge, Henderson, Unseld, Wright (4)	Capital Centre; 5,774	15–9
25	December 13, 1977; 8:05 p.m. EST	Golden State	W 102–96	Chenier (25)	Hayes (17)	Henderson (6)	Capital Centre; 8,693	16–9
26	December 16, 1977; 9:35 p.m. EST	@ Denver	W 117–112 (OT)	Hayes (33)	Hayes (20)	Dandridge (10)	McNichols Sports Arena; 15,922	17–9
27	December 17, 1977; 11:00 p.m. EST	@ Portland	L 104–117	Dandridge (17)	Hayes (10)	Wright (5)	Memorial Coliseum; 12,666	17–10
28	December 18, 1977; 10:00 p.m. EST	@ Seattle	L 109–111 (OT)	Henderson (24)	Unseld (13)	Hayes (5)	Seattle Center Coliseum; 13,563	17–11
29	December 20, 1977; 11:00 p.m. EST	@ Los Angeles	L 115–120	Kupchak (23)	Kupchak (10)	Wright (9)	The Forum; 13,475	17–12
30	December 25, 1977; 7:35 p.m. EST	Atlanta	W 100–93	Dandridge (24)	Unseld (14)	Henderson (9)	Capital Centre; 8,358	18–12
31	December 26, 1977; 8:10 p.m. EST	@ Atlanta	W 113–106	Henderson (21)	Hayes (13)	Henderson (8)	The Omni; 8,321	19–12
32	December 28, 1977; 8:05 p.m. EST	Buffalo	W 106–87	Hayes (18)	Unseld (15)	Hayes, Unseld, Wright (4)	Capital Centre; 11,394	20–12
33	December 30, 1977; 8:05 p.m. EST	@ Philadelphia	L 119–126	Kupchak (22)	Unseld (14)	Dandridge (8)	The Spectrum; 18,276	20–13

January: 6–8 (home: 5–2; road: 1–6)

Game	Date	Team	Score	High points	High rebounds	High assists	Location Attendance	Record
34	January 3, 1978; 8:05 p.m. EST	Denver	L 100–101	Chenier (23)	Hayes (18)	Henderson (7)	Capital Centre; 9,457	20–14
35	January 6, 1978; 8:05 p.m. EST	Indiana	W 146–114	Dandridge (29)	Hayes, Unseld (10)	Dandridge (8)	Capital Centre; 9,215	21–14
36	January 8, 1978; 1:45 p.m. EST	@ New Jersey	W 99–98	Dandridge (20)	Hayes (16)	Henderson, Unseld (6)	Rutgers Athletic Center; 4,196	22–14
37	January 10, 1978; 8:05 p.m. EST	Kansas City	W 123–115	Hayes (27)	Ballard (13)	Henderson (11)	Capital Centre; 7,700	23–14
38	January 11, 1978; 8:10 p.m. EST	@ Atlanta (at Charlotte, North Carolina)	L 95–100	Hayes (24)	Ballard, Hayes (14)	Henderson (6)	Charlotte Coliseum; 2,162	23–15
39	January 13, 1978; 8:05 p.m. EST	Portland	W 102–93	Dandridge (22)	Hayes (13)	Henderson (6)	Capital Centre; 17,610	24–15
40	January 14, 1978; 7:30 p.m. EST	@ Buffalo	L 93–130	Dandridge (22)	Hayes, Unseld (9)	Unseld (4)	Buffalo Memorial Auditorium; 5,036	24–16
41	January 18, 1978; 10:30 p.m. EST	@ Golden State	L 106–113	Dandridge (25)	Unseld (14)	Wright (9)	Oakland–Alameda County Coliseum Arena	24–17
42	January 20, 1978; 11:00 p.m. EST	@ Los Angeles	L 99–121	Walker (23)	Kupchak (9)	Wright (6)	The Forum; 13,064	24–18
43	January 22, 1978; 6:45 p.m. EST	@ Phoenix	L 101–114	Hayes (26)	Hayes (19)	Unseld (7)	Arizona Veterans Memorial Coliseum; 12,660	24–19
44	January 24, 1978; 8:05 p.m. EST	Detroit	L 101–104	Grevey (24)	Hayes (16)	Unseld, Wright (4)	Capital Centre; 6,717	24–20
45	January 26, 1978; 8:05 p.m. EST	Chicago	W 135–107	Dandridge (37)	Hayes (10)	Wright (11)	Capital Centre; 7,442	25–20
46	January 29, 1978; 1:45 p.m. EST	Los Angeles	W 119–112	Dandridge (29)	Hayes (19)	Wright (6)	Capital Centre; 17,779	26–20
47	January 31, 1978; 8:30 p.m. EST	@ San Antonio	L 109–129	Hayes (21)	Hayes (14)	Wright (6)	HemisFair Arena; 9,000	26–21

February: 5–8 (home: 4–1; road: 1–7)

Game	Date	Team	Score	High points	High rebounds	High assists	Location Attendance	Record
48	February 2, 1978; 8:00 p.m. EST	@ Cleveland	L 93–110	Dandridge (25)	Hayes (13)	Wright (6)	Richfield Coliseum; 7,553	26–22
49	February 3, 1978; 7:30 p.m. EST	@ Boston	L 94–116	Grevey (25)	Hayes (18)	Unseld (4)	Boston Garden; 12,206	26–23
All-Star Break
50	February 7, 1978; 10:30 p.m. EST	@ Golden State	L 102–105	Hayes (25)	Unseld (18)	Henderson (8)	Oakland–Alameda County Coliseum Arena; 9,935	26–24
51	February 8, 1978; 11:00 p.m. EST	@ Seattle	W 106–100	Hayes (25)	Hayes (21)	Wright (6)	Seattle Center Coliseum; 12,126	27–24
52	February 12, 1978; 6:45 p.m. EST	@ Phoenix	L 109–121	Hayes (34)	Hayes (16)	Henderson (7)	Arizona Veterans Memorial Coliseum; 12,467	27–25
53	February 14, 1978; 9:35 p.m. EST	@ Denver	L 98–103	Grevey (24)	Unseld (18)	Dandridge, Henderson (6)	McNichols Sports Arena; 15,636	27–26
54	February 16, 1978; 8:05 p.m. EST	Buffalo	W 123–109	Hayes (25)	Unseld (17)	Dandridge (7)	Capital Centre; 6,857	28–26
55	February 17, 1978; 8:05 p.m. EST	@ Indiana	L 111–123	Hayes (26)	Unseld (21)	Henderson, Unseld (5)	Market Square Arena; 10,637	28–27
56	February 19, 1978; 1:45 p.m. EST	New Orleans	W 130–111	Hayes (31)	Unseld (17)	Unseld, Wright (8)	Capital Centre; 16,505	29–27
57	February 22, 1978; 8:05 p.m. EST	Portland	L 97–105	Hayes (26)	Unseld (12)	Henderson (9)	Capital Centre; 11,554	29–28
58	February 24, 1978; 8:05 p.m. EST	Phoenix	W 121–120 (OT)	Hayes (23)	Unseld (24)	Henderson (10)	Capital Centre; 12,432	30–28
59	February 26, 1978; 1:45 p.m. EST	Golden State	W 121–110	Hayes (37)	Hayes (18)	Unseld (7)	Capital Centre; 13,814	31–28
60	February 28, 1978; 9:05 p.m. EST	@ Milwaukee	L 135–136 (OT)	Johnson (25)	Unseld (27)	Henderson (7)	MECCA Arena; 10,938	31–29

March: 10–7 (home: 5–5; road: 5–2)

Game	Date	Team	Score	High points	High rebounds	High assists	Location Attendance	Record
61	March 1, 1978; 8:05 p.m. EST	San Antonio	W 125–110	Grevey (29)	Hayes (21)	Henderson (11)	Capital Centre; 8,425	32–29
62	March 3, 1978; 8:05 p.m. EST	@ Detroit	W 124–108	Grevey (32)	Hayes (27)	Henderson (7)	Cobo Arena; 5,033	33–29
63	March 5, 1978; 1:45 p.m. EST	Houston	W 106–88	Dandridge (26)	Hayes (15)	Henderson (7)	Capital Centre; 14,344	34–29
64	March 10, 1978; 9:05 p.m. EST	@ Houston	W 117–114	Grevey (43)	Unseld (18)	Henderson (8)	The Summit; 7,506	35–29
65	March 11, 1978; 8:30 p.m. EST	@ San Antonio	L 101–116	Grevey (28)	Hayes (13)	Henderson (7)	HemisFair Arena; 9,465	35–30
66	March 14, 1978; 8:05 p.m. EST	Seattle	120–115	Dandridge, Hayes, Kupchak (24)	Hayes, Unseld (10)	Dandridge (7)	Capital Centre; 7,804	36–30
67	March 16, 1978; 8:30 p.m. EST	@ Chicago	L 107–111	Dandridge (23)	Hayes (8)	Grevey (7)	Chicago Stadium; 11,972	36–31
68	March 17, 1978; 8:05 p.m. EST	Indiana	L 99–105	Kupchak (30)	Hayes, Unseld (17)	Hayes (5)	Capital Centre; 8,196	36–32
69	March 19, 1978; 7:35 p.m. EST	Milwaukee	L 106–117	Hayes (32)	Hayes, Unseld (13)	Grevey (7)	Capital Centre; 9,492	36–33
70	March 21, 1978; 8:05 p.m. EST	Boston	W 119–107	Hayes (34)	Unseld (11)	Unseld (7)	Capital Centre; 17,252	37–33
71	March 22, 1978; 8:35 p.m. EST	@ New Orleans	W 124–109	Grevey (30)	Hayes (16)	Dandridge (7)	Louisiana Superdome; 13,143	38–33
72	March 24, 1978; 8:05 p.m. EST	@ New Jersey	W 107–104	Dandridge (30)	Hayes (16)	Hendersonn (9)	Rutgers Athletic Center; 5,833	39–33
73	March 25, 1978; 8:05 p.m. EST	Atlanta	W 98–95	Dandridge (18)	Hayes (15)	Henderson (5)	Capital Centre; 8,190	40–33
74	March 26, 1978; 1:45 p.m. EST	New Jersey	L 104–118	Grevey, Hayes, Kupchak (25)	Unseld (24)	Henderson (7)	Capital Centre; 5,750	40–34
75	March 29, 1978; 8:05 p.m. EST	Kansas City	L 105–108 (OT)	Grevey (30)	Hayes (21)	Unseld (10)	Capital Centre; 6,717	40–35
76	March 30, 1978; 8:35 p.m. EST	@ New York	W 123–108	Dandridge (28)	Hayes (22)	Dandridge, Unseld, Wright (4)	Madison Square Garden; 12,702	41–35
77	March 31, 1978; 8:05 p.m. EST	Cleveland	L 101–102	Hayes (26)	Hayes (12)	Unseld (9)	Capital Centre; 8,660	41–36

April: 3–2 (home: 2–1; road: 1–1)

Game	Date	Team	Score	High points	High rebounds	High assists	Location Attendance	Record
78	April 2, 1978; 1:45 p.m. EST	New York	L 109–114	Kupchak (30)	Johnson (9)	Johnson (4)	Capital Centre; 7,193	41–37
79	April 5, 1978; 8:05 p.m. EST	Los Angeles	W 125–119	Unseld (25)	Hayes (17)	Henderson, Unseld (7)	Capital Centre; 14,671	42–37
80	April 6, 1978; 7:30 p.m. EST	@ Boston (at Providence, Rhode Island)	W 112–103	Hayes (21)	Ballard, Unseld (16)	Ballard, Wright (6)	Providence Civic Center; 10,755	43–37
81	April 8, 1978; 8:05 p.m. EST	@ Philadelphia	L 114–131	Kupchak (31)	Kupchak (14)	Grevey, Hayes, Johnson, Kupchak, Unseld (3)	The Spectrum; 14,711	43–38
82	April 9, 1978; 1:30 p.m. EST	Philadelphia	W 123–113	Johnson (29)	Unseld (16)	Walker (7)	Capital Centre; 17,952	44–38

1977–78 schedule

=== Playoffs ===
1978 playoff game log
Total: 14–7 (Home: 9–1; Road: 5–6)
Eastern Conference First Round: 2–0 (home: 1–0; road: 1–0)

Game	Date	Team	Score	High points	High rebounds	High assists	Location Attendance	Series
1	April 12, 1978; 8:05 p.m. EST	Atlanta	W 103–94	Dandridge (20)	Unseld (15)	Unseld (7)	Capital Centre; 9,326	1–0
2	April 14, 1978; 8:10 p.m. EST	@ Atlanta	W 107–103 (OT)	Grevey (41)	Unseld (15)	Henderson (5)	The Omni; 15,601	2–0

Eastern Conference Semifinals: 4–2 (home: 3–0; road: 1–2)

Game	Date	Team	Score	High points	High rebounds	High assists	Location Attendance	Series
1	April 16, 1978; 1:30 p.m. EST	@ San Antonio	L 103–114	Hayes (26)	Hayes (15)	Hayes (6)	HemisFair Arena; 9,669	0–1
2	April 18, 1978; 8:30 p.m. EST	@ San Antonio	W 121–117	Grevey (31)	Unseld (13)	Wright (8)	HemisFair Arena; 9,871	1–1
3	April 21, 1978; 8:05 p.m. EST	San Antonio	W 118–105	Dandridge (28)	Hayes (12)	Unseld (8)	Capital Centre; 17,417	2–1
4	April 23, 1978; 8:05 p.m. EST	San Antonio	W 98–95	Dandridge (24)	Hayes (13)	Dandridge (8)	Capital Centre; 13,459	3–1
5	April 25, 1978; 8:30 p.m. EST	@ San Antonio	L 105–116	Johnson (21)	Hayes (13)	Unseld (6)	HemisFair Arena; 9,709	3–2
6	April 28, 1978; 8:05 p.m. EST	San Antonio	W 103–100	Hayes (25)	Unseld (16)	Unsled (5)	Capital Centre; 19,035	4–2

Eastern Conference Finals: 4–2 (home: 3–0; road: 1–2)

Game	Date	Team	Score	High points	High rebounds	High assists	Location Attendance	Series
1	April 30, 1978; 1:30 p.m. EDT	@ Philadelphia	W 122–117 (OT)	Hayes (28)	Hayes (18)	Henderson (9)	The Spectrum; 13,708	1–0
2	May 3, 1978; 8:05 p.m. EDT	@ Philadelphia	L 104–110	Hayes (26)	Hayes (15)	Henderson, Wright (8)	The Spectrum; 18,276	1–1
3	May 5, 1978; 8:05 p.m. EDT	Philadelphia	W 123–108	Dandridge (30)	Hayes (12)	Dandridge (7)	Capital Centre; 19,035	2–1
4	May 7, 1978; 1:30 p.m. EDT	Philadelphia	W 121–105	Hayes (35)	Hayes (19)	Dandridge, Kevin Grevey, Johnson, Wright (6)	Capital Centre; 19,035	3–1
5	May 10, 1978; 8:05 p.m. EDT	@ Philadelphia	L 94–107	Wright (18)	Hayes, Unseld (16)	Unseld (5)	The Spectrum; 18,276	3–2
6	May 12, 1978; 8:05 p.m. EDT	Philadelphia	W 101–99	Dandridge (28)	Unseld (15)	Henderson (6)	Capital Centre; 19,035	4–2

NBA Finals: 4–3 (home: 2–1; road: 2–2)

Game	Date	Team	Score	High points	High rebounds	High assists	Location Attendance	Series
1	May 21, 1978; 3:00 p.m. EDT	@ Seattle	L 102–106	Grevey (27)	Hayes (9)	Henderson (7)	Seattle Center Coliseum; 14,098	0–1
2	May 25, 1978; 9:00 p.m. EDT	Seattle	W 106–98	Dandridge (34)	Unseld (15)	Henderson, Unseld (5)	Capital Centre; 19,035	1–1
3	May 28, 1978; 1:30 p.m. EDT	Seattle	L 92–93	Hayes (29)	Hayes (20)	Dandridge (6)	Capital Centre; 19,035	1–2
4	May 30, 1978; 9:00 p.m. EDT	@ Seattle	W 120–116 (OT)	Dandridge (23)	Hayes (13)	Henderson (11)	Kingdome; 39,457	2–2
5	June 2, 1978; 9:00 p.m. EDT	@ Seattle	L 94–98	Grevey (22)	Dandridge (10)	Henderson (6)	Seattle Center Coliseum; 14,098	2–3
6	June 4, 1978; 1:30 p.m. EDT	Seattle	W 117–82	Hayes (21)	Hayes (15)	Ballard (6)	Capital Centre; 19,035	3–3
7	June 7, 1978; 9:00 p.m. EDT	@ Seattle	W 105–99	Dandridge, Johnson (19)	Unseld (9)	Unseld (6)	Seattle Center Coliseum; 14,098	4–3

1978 schedule

== Player stats ==
=== Regular season ===
Note: GP= Games played; GS= Games started; MP=Minutes played; FG=Field goals; FGA=Field goals attempted; FG%=Field goal percentage; FT=Free throws; FTA=Free throws attempted; FT%=Free throw percentage; ORB= Offensive rebounds; DRB= Defensive rebounds; TRB= Total rebounds; AST= Assists; STL = Steals; BLK = Blocks; PTS = Points; AVG = Average

Player	GP	GS	MP	FG	FGA	FG%	FT	FTA	FT%	ORB	DRB	TRB	AST	STL	BLK	PTS	AVG
Hayes	81		3246	636	1409	.451	326	514	.635	335	740	1075	149	96	159	1598	19.7
Dandridge	75		2777	560	1190	.471	330	419	.788	137	305	442	287	101	44	1450	19.3
Kupchak	67		1759	393	768	.512	280	402	.697	162	298	460	71	28	42	1066	15.9
Grevey	81		2121	505	1128	.448	243	308	.789	124	166	290	155	61	17	1253	15.5
Chenier	36		937	200	451	.443	109	138	.790	15	87	102	73	36	9	509	14.1
Henderson	75		2315	339	784	.432	179	240	.746	66	127	193	406	93	15	857	11.4
Wright	70		1466	283	570	.496	76	107	.710	31	71	102	260	68	15	642	9.2
Johnson	39		807	141	346	.408	42	51	.824	20	73	93	82	31	1	324	8.3
Unseld	80		2644	257	491	.523	93	173	.538	286	669	955	326	98	45	607	7.6
Ballard	76		936	142	334	.425	88	114	.772	102	164	266	62	30	13	372	4.9
Walker	40		384	57	161	.354	64	96	.667	21	31	52	54	14	5	178	4.5
Pace	49		438	67	140	.479	57	93	.613	50	84	134	23	12	24	191	3.9
Total	82		19830	3580	7772	.461	1887	2655	.711	1349	2815	4164	1948	668	386	9047	110.3

=== Playoffs ===
Note: GP= Games played; GS= Games started; MP=Minutes played; FG=Field goals; FGA=Field goals attempted; FG%=Field goal percentage; FT=Free throws; FTA=Free throws attempted; FT%=Free throw percentage; ORB= Offensive rebounds; DRB= Defensive rebounds; TRB= Total rebounds; AST= Assists; STL = Steals; BLK = Blocks; PTS = Points; AVG = Average

Player	GP	GS	MP	FG	FGA	FG%	FT	FTA	FT%	ORB	DRB	TRB	AST	STL	BLK	PTS	AVG
Hayes	21		868	189	385	.491	79	133	.594	103	176	279	43	32	52	457	21.8
Dandridge	19		746	172	359	.479	58	84	.690	35	88	123	74	30	14	402	21.1
Grevey	21		584	126	284	.444	73	90	.811	25	36	61	42	11	3	325	15.5
Johnson	21		425	93	229	.406	29	37	.784	20	33	53	48	30	0	215	10.2
Kupchak	21		504	84	199	.422	45	69	.652	49	78	127	22	4	3	213	10.1
Henderson	21		597	72	173	.416	58	79	.734	17	30	47	106	27	5	202	9.6
Unseld	18		677	71	134	.530	27	46	.587	72	144	216	79	17	7	169	9.4
Wright	21		402	76	163	.466	19	25	.760	7	24	31	67	17	2	171	8.1
Ballard	19		243	21	63	.333	32	41	.780	27	52	79	18	9	3	74	3.9
Pace	9		52	7	10	.700	11	15	.733	5	15	20	1	1	6	25	2.8
Walker	4		17	1	8	.125	4	5	.800	1	1	2	2	0	0	6	1.5
Total	21		5115	912	2007		435	583		361	677	1038	502	178	95	2259	114.1

== NBA Finals ==
After being swept in their previous two trips to the NBA Finals (by Milwaukee in 1971 and Golden State in 1975), the Bullets lost Game 1 on the road against the Seattle SuperSonics, and a 19-point lead vanished in the process. In Game 4, the Bullets rose to the occasion beating the Sonics 120–116 to even the series at 2 games apiece. After losing Game 5 in Seattle, the Bullets kept their hopes alive with a dominating 117–82 win at the Capital Centre. Game 7 returned to Seattle and the Bullets were a heavy underdog. Kevin Grevey suffered a sprained wrist above his shooting hand, and Bob Dandridge was forced to see some action at guard. Dandridge would play strongly and scored 19 points to tie with Charles Johnson, who hit a half court shot at the end of the 3rd quarter, for the team high. Wes Unseld scored 15 points while pulling down 9 rebounds as the Bullets emerged with a 105–99 victory to win their first NBA Championship.

== Awards and honors ==
- Wes Unseld, NBA Finals Most Valuable Player Award
