= Richwood High School (Louisiana) =

School in Ouachita Parish, Louisiana, USA

Location
- 5901 Highway 165 South; Monroe, (Ouachita Parish), Louisiana 71202; United States
- 32.4323°N 92.0900°W

Information
- Type: Public high school
- School district: Ouachita Parish School Board
- Principal: Alvin Fields
- Staff: 34.49 (FTE)
- Enrollment: 506 (2022-2023)
- Student to teacher ratio: 14.67
- Colors: Red and white
- Mascot: Rams

Richwood High School is a public high school in unincorporated Ouachita Parish, Louisiana, United States, south of the City of Richwood. It is a part of the Ouachita Parish School Board.

== History ==
Abe E. Pierce, III, the first African American mayor of Monroe (1996–2000) taught science at Richwood and served as principal from 1956 to 1966. He said in a 2009 interview that teaching at Richwood had been the most rewarding of all the jobs he ever held.

== Athletics ==
Richwood High athletics competes in the LHSAA.

=== Championships ===
Football championships

- (4) State Championships: 1962, 1963, 1964, 1974

== Notable alumni ==
- Joe Profit, 1st round draft pick and running back in the NFL for the Atlanta Falcons
- Boo Robinson, defensive tackle in the NFL for the Philadelphia Eagles
- Storm Warren (born 1988), power forward for the LSU Tigers and the Israeli Basketball Premier League
- Ronnie Washington, 8th round pick and linebacker in the NFL for the Atlanta Falcons
- Sammy White, former NFL wide receiver for the Minnesota Vikings
- Rod Williams, cornerback in the CFL for the Edmonton Eskimos and Saskatchewan Roughriders
- Larry Wright, 1st round draft pick number 17 guard in NBA for Washington Bullets, head coach of the Grambling Tigers men's basketball team
