= 1977–78 NBA season =

32nd NBA season

- League: National Basketball Association
- Sport: Basketball
- Duration: October 18, 1977 – April 9, 1978; April 11 – May 17, 1978 (Playoffs); May 21 – June 7, 1978 (Finals)
- Games: 82
- Teams: 22
- TV partner: CBS

Draft
- Top draft pick: Kent Benson
- Picked by: Milwaukee Bucks

Regular season
- Top seed: Portland Trail Blazers
- Season MVP: Bill Walton (Portland)
- Top scorer: George Gervin (San Antonio)

Playoffs
- Eastern champions: Washington Bullets
- Eastern runners-up: Philadelphia 76ers
- Western champions: Seattle SuperSonics
- Western runners-up: Denver Nuggets

Finals
- Champions: Washington Bullets
- Runners-up: Seattle SuperSonics
- Finals MVP: Wes Unseld (Washington)

NBA seasons
- ← 1976–77 1978–79 →

The 1977–78 NBA season was the 32nd season of the National Basketball Association. The season ended with the Washington Bullets winning the NBA championship, beating the Seattle SuperSonics 4 games to 3 in the NBA Finals.

== Notable occurrences ==
- On October 10, 1977, and in a shocking moment to Knicks fans, the New York Knicks traded Walt Frazier to the Cleveland Cavaliers as compensation for a free agent signing. That free agent the Knicks got was Jim Cleamons.
- The New York Nets moved from Uniondale, New York to Piscataway, New Jersey, and were renamed the New Jersey Nets. The New York Knicks, who forced the Nets to pay $4.8 million for invading the New York area prior to the previous season, remained the only NBA team in New York City for 35 years, until the Nets moved to Brooklyn in the 2012–13 season.
- The 1978 NBA All-Star Game was played at the Omni Coliseum in Atlanta, with the East beating the West 133–125. Randy Smith of the Buffalo Braves won the game's MVP award.
- The defending champion Portland Trail Blazers started with a 50–10 record and looked poised to repeat, but Bill Walton broke his foot and was sidelined for the remainder of the season. The Blazers, hurt by Walton's absence and by other key injuries, faded to an 8–14 finish and lost to the Sonics in the Western Conference semifinals.
- On December 9, 1977, Kermit Washington punched Houston Rockets player Rudy Tomjanovich in the face during an NBA game. Tomjanovich sustained serious injuries and missed the rest of the season. The NBA fined Washington $10,000 and suspended him for 26 games.
- Throughout the 1977–78 season, CBS broadcast NBA games during the regular season and the playoffs. During halftime of those games, they showed a pre-taped H–O–R–S–E tournament pitting players from the NBA against each other. It featured, among others, Pete Maravich, Paul Westphal, Bob McAdoo, Kevin Grevey, and George Gervin. Maravich and Westphal made it to the final, and CBS originally planned to hold their match at halftime during an NBA Finals game. However, Maravich was injured and could not participate, so CBS decided to have Westphal compete against "Bag-Man" (who was actually analyst Rick Barry with a bag covering his head) by letting them both shoot a free throw. Westphal, blindfolded, went first and hit his. Barry missed, and Westphal was awarded the trophy. The NBA H–O–R–S–E competition would not be re-instituted for 31 more years, returning for the 2009 All-Star Weekend.
- This was the first season since the 1949–50 season that no Boston Celtics player was named to either the First or Second All-NBA Team.
- This was also the last season for longtime Boston Celtics' player John Havlicek, who retired at the end of the season after sixteen years in the NBA all with the legendary franchise.
- Also retiring this season were Dave Bing, Cazzie Russell and George Karl, though Karl would later become an NBA coach.
- With 8 minutes and 43 seconds of the final quarter remaining in the game between the Atlanta Hawks and the Milwaukee Bucks on the 25th of November, the Hawks were leading by 29 points, and looked set for an easy win. The Bucks then outscored the Hawks 35–4 to win the game by two points, 117–115. The Bucks' victory is still the biggest fourth quarter comeback in NBA history.

Coaching changes
Offseason
Team	1976–77 coach	1977–78 coach
Buffalo Braves	Joe Mullaney (interim)	Cotton Fitzsimmons
New York Knicks	Red Holzman	Willis Reed
Seattle SuperSonics	Bill Russell	Bob Hopkins
In-season
Team	Outgoing coach	Incoming coach
Boston Celtics	Tom Heinsohn	Satch Sanders
Detroit Pistons	Herb Brown	Bob Kauffman
Kansas City Kings	Phil Johnson	Larry Staverman
Philadelphia 76ers	Gene Shue	Billy Cunningham
Seattle SuperSonics	Bob Hopkins	Lenny Wilkens

== Final standings ==
=== By division ===
Atlantic Division	W	L	PCT	GB	Home	Road	Div
y-Philadelphia 76ers	55	27	.671	–	37–4	18–23	14–2
x-New York Knicks	43	39	.524	12	29–12	14–27	7–9
Boston Celtics	32	50	.390	23	24–17	8–33	8–8
Buffalo Braves	27	55	.329	28	20–21	7–34	7–9
New Jersey Nets	24	58	.293	31	18–23	6–35	4–12

Central Division	W	L	PCT	GB	Home	Road	Div
y-San Antonio Spurs	52	30	.634	–	32–9	20–21	15–5
x-Washington Bullets	44	38	.537	8	29–12	15–26	14–6
x-Cleveland Cavaliers	43	39	.524	9	27–14	16–25	9–11
x-Atlanta Hawks	41	41	.500	11	29–12	12–29	8–12
New Orleans Jazz	39	43	.476	13	27–14	12–29	8–12
Houston Rockets	28	54	.341	24	21-20	7-34	6–14

Midwest Division	W	L	PCT	GB	Home	Road	Div
y-Denver Nuggets	48	34	.585	–	33–8	15–26	11–9
x-Milwaukee Bucks	44	38	.537	4	28–13	16–25	14–6
Chicago Bulls	40	42	.488	8	29–12	11–30	8–12
Detroit Pistons	38	44	.463	10	24–17	14–27	8–12
Indiana Pacers	31	51	.378	17	21–20	10–31	8–12
Kansas City Kings	31	51	.378	17	22–19	9–32	11–9

Pacific Division	W	L	PCT	GB	Home	Road	Div
y-Portland Trail Blazers	58	24	.707	–	36–5	22–19	13–3
x-Phoenix Suns	49	33	.598	9	34–7	15–26	8–8
x-Seattle SuperSonics	47	35	.573	11	31–10	16–25	8–8
x-Los Angeles Lakers	45	37	.549	13	29–12	16–25	6–10
Golden State Warriors	43	39	.524	15	30–11	13–28	5–11

=== By conference ===
#	Eastern Conference				
#	Team	W	L	PCT	GB
1	z-Philadelphia 76ers	55	27	.671	–
2	y-San Antonio Spurs	52	30	.634	3
3	x-Washington Bullets	44	38	.537	11
4	x-Cleveland Cavaliers	43	39	.524	12
5	x-New York Knicks	43	39	.524	12
6	x-Atlanta Hawks	41	41	.500	14
7	New Orleans Jazz	39	43	.476	16
8	Boston Celtics	32	50	.390	23
9	Houston Rockets	28	54	.341	27
10	Buffalo Braves	27	55	.329	28
11	New Jersey Nets	24	58	.293	31

#	Western Conference				
#	Team	W	L	PCT	GB
1	z-Portland Trail Blazers	58	24	.707	–
2	y-Denver Nuggets	48	34	.585	10
3	x-Phoenix Suns	49	33	.598	9
4	x-Seattle SuperSonics	47	35	.573	11
5	x-Los Angeles Lakers	45	37	.549	13
6	x-Milwaukee Bucks	44	38	.537	14
7	Golden State Warriors	43	39	.524	15
8	Chicago Bulls	40	42	.488	18
9	Detroit Pistons	38	44	.463	20
10	Indiana Pacers	31	51	.378	27
11	Kansas City Kings	31	51	.378	27

Notes

- z, y – division champions
- x – clinched playoff spot

== Playoffs ==
Teams in bold advanced to the next round. The numbers to the left of each team indicate the team's seeding in its conference, and the numbers to the right indicate the number of games the team won in that round. The division champions are marked by an asterisk. Home court advantage does not necessarily belong to the higher-seeded team, but instead the team with the better regular season record; teams enjoying the home advantage are shown in italics.

First Round
E4	Cleveland	0
**E5**	**New York**	**2**
**E3**	**Washington**	**2**
E6	Atlanta	0
**W4**	**Seattle**	**2**
W5	Los Angeles	1
W3	Phoenix	0
**W6**	**Milwaukee**	**2**

Conference Semifinals
**E1**	**Philadelphia***	**4**
E5	New York	0
**Eastern Conference**
**E3**	**Washington**	**4**
E2	San Antonio*	2
W1	Portland*	2
**W4**	**Seattle**	**4**
**Western Conference**
W6	Milwaukee	3
**W2**	**Denver***	**4**

Conference Finals
E1	Philadelphia*	2
**E3**	**Washington**	**4**
**W4**	**Seattle**	**4**
W2	Denver*	2

NBA Finals
**E3**	**Washington**	**4**
W4	Seattle	3

- * Division winner
- **Bold** Series winner
- Italic Team with home-court advantage

== Statistics leaders ==
Category	Player	Team	Stat
Points per game	George Gervin	San Antonio Spurs	27.2
Rebounds per game	Truck Robinson	New Orleans Jazz	15.7
Assists per game	Kevin Porter	Detroit–New Jersey	10.2
Steals per game	Ron Lee	Phoenix Suns	2.74
Blocks per game	George Johnson	New Jersey Nets	3.38
FG%	Bobby Jones	Denver Nuggets	.578
FT%	Rick Barry	Golden State Warriors	.924

== NBA awards ==
- Most Valuable Player: Bill Walton, Portland Trail Blazers
- Rookie of the Year: Walter Davis, Phoenix Suns
- Coach of the Year: Hubie Brown, Atlanta Hawks

- All-NBA First Team:
  - F – Julius Erving, Philadelphia 76ers
  - F – Truck Robinson, New Orleans Jazz
  - C – Bill Walton, Portland Trail Blazers
  - G – George Gervin, San Antonio Spurs
  - G – David Thompson, Denver Nuggets
- All-NBA Second Team:
  - F – Walter Davis, Phoenix Suns
  - F – Maurice Lucas, Portland Trail Blazers
  - C – Kareem Abdul-Jabbar, Los Angeles Lakers
  - G – Paul Westphal, Phoenix Suns
  - G – Pete Maravich, New Orleans Jazz

- All-NBA Rookie Team:
  - Bernard King, New Jersey Nets
  - Marques Johnson, Milwaukee Bucks
  - Jack Sikma, Seattle SuperSonics
  - Norm Nixon, Los Angeles Lakers
  - Walter Davis, Phoenix Suns

- NBA All-Defensive First Team:
  - Bobby Jones, Denver Nuggets
  - Maurice Lucas, Portland Trail Blazers
  - Bill Walton, Portland Trail Blazers
  - Lionel Hollins, Portland Trail Blazers
  - Don Buse, Phoenix Suns
- NBA All-Defensive Second Team:
  - E.C. Coleman, Golden State Warriors
  - Bob Gross, Portland Trail Blazers
  - Kareem Abdul-Jabbar, Los Angeles Lakers (tie)
  - Artis Gilmore, Chicago Bulls (tie)
  - Norm Van Lier, Chicago Bulls
  - Quinn Buckner, Milwaukee Bucks

== See also ==
- List of NBA regular season records
