= The George Gund Foundation =

Private foundation based in Cleveland, Ohio, U.S.

- Founded: 1952; 74 years ago
- Founder: George Gund II
- Purpose: Combat climate change and environmental degradation, economic inequality, racial inequity, and weakened democracy; Promote environmental justice, creative culture and arts, public education, thriving families and social justice, vibrant neighborhoods, and an inclusive economy.
- Location(s): 1845 Guildhall Building 45 West Prospect Avenue Cleveland, Ohio, U.S.
- Region served: Cleveland, United States
- Method: Grants, program related investments (PRIs)
- Executive Director: David Abbott
- President: Catherine Gund
- Endowment: $486.9 million USD (2018)
- Website: gundfoundation.org

The George Gund Foundation is a charitable foundation established in 1952 to provide grants in the areas of the arts, civic engagement, community development, economic development, environmental policy, and human services, public education, racial inequality. As of 2019, the foundation had made grants totaling more than $722 million since its inception. It is the second-largest charitable foundation in Cleveland.

== History ==
=== Formation ===
The George Gund Foundation was created in 1952 as a private foundation by George Gund II, a businessman living in Cleveland, Ohio. Gund inherited a sizeable brewing industry fortune from his father. President Woodrow Wilson signed the Food and Fuel Control Act into law on August 10, 1917, which banned the manufacture of retail liquor and beer for the duration of the emergency created by World War I. Unable to make beer, in May 1919 Gund purchased all 15,000 shares of the American subsidiary of the German company Kaffee HAG, which had developed a process for manufacturing instant decaffeinated coffee. Spending just $318,768 ($5.92 million in 2025 dollars) to purchase the company, Gund sold it to Kellogg's in 1927 for $10 million ($185 million in 2025 dollars). Gund became a major stockholder in Kellogg's, and invested in banking, insurance, and real estate. Among his investments was the purchase of a significant amount of stock in the Cleveland Trust Company, a small Cleveland bank. He was named a director of the bank in 1937, its president in 1941, and chairman of the board in 1962. Gund transformed the bank into Cleveland's largest bank; at the time of his death, it was the 18th largest bank in the United States. He was one of Cleveland's richest men at the time of his death in 1966, worth about $200 million ($1.93 billion in 2025 dollars). (Note: A number of sources claim Gund's fortune was actually $600 million. The New York Times mentioned an anecdote about Gund's $600 million fortune in a 1971 article. Robert A. Musson, a historian of the Cleveland brewing scene, wrote in 2005 that Gund was worth $600 million at the time of his death. The magazine Vanity Fair even claimed that Gund gave $600 million to the George Gund Foundation in 1952. Musson's claim is contradicted by the findings of the probate court, which found an estate worth just $25 million. The Vanity Fair claim is contradicted by tax reports the foundation made to the U.S. federal government, which showed only about a $24 million donation after Gund's death.)

At the end of 1953, The George Gund Foundation had assets worth just $166,878 ($2.03 million in 2025 dollars). The foundation received certification from the Internal Revenue Service as a 501(c)(3) charitable organization in 1955. By 1960, it had about $30 million ($326,500,000 in 2025 dollars) in assets. Disbursement of funds to various causes left The George Gund Foundation with just $16.4 million ($170,200,000 in 2025 dollars) in assets by 1964. In the 1950s, the foundation focused primarily on education and grants were small, ranging from $10 to $10,000. Grant amounts began to become substantially larger after 1960.

=== Transition period ===
At Gund's death in November 1966, his estate was worth about $24.5 million ($243 million in 2025 dollars) after the payment of debts and fees. (Note: Gund had donated some of his fortune to the Gund Foundation, and distributed most of the rest to three trusts which benefitted his children.) The bulk of his estate went to The George Gund Foundation. With this contribution, the fund's assets rose to just over $40 million ($397 million in 2025 dollars). (Note: $18.9 million of Gund's estate consisted of stock. According to The Plain Dealer newspaper, the largest holdings were $8.7 million of Kellogg's stock, $1.5 million in Traveler's Corp. stock, $1.15 million in Northern Life Insurance Company stock, and $1.05 million in Standard Oil stock.)

George Gund II's death left the foundation in the hands of four trustees: His 27-year-old son, Gordon Gund; George F. Karch, chairman of the Cleveland Trust Company; Frederick K. Cox, vice chairman of the Cleveland Trust Company; and Hawley E. Stark, corporate legal counsel for the Cleveland Trust Company. The latter three were all George Gund II's close friends. Stark became the foundation's president. (Note: Stark became a trustee of the foundation in the early 1960s. Gordon Gund became a trustee in 1965.)

In 1967, 1968, and 1969, The George Gund Foundation made $9 million worth of donations, of which $6.5 million went to name buildings and programs in honor of George Gund II.

=== Expansion in vision ===
In 1969, the foundation hired its first full-time staff person. This was James S. Lipscomb, and he served as executive director of The George Gund Foundation from 1969 until his death in June 1987. During Lipscomb's tenure, the foundation trustees began re-examining the foundation's focus and decided to widen its focus to include civic, cultural, social, economic, and environmental needs. For the first time, The George Gund Foundation began supporting community organizations and began making grants to nonprofits working in the areas of affordable housing, child abuse prevention, drug abuse prevention, gun control, and juvenile justice. Under Lipscomb's guidance, the foundation's assets grew significantly from 1970 to 1981, reaching $83 million ($294 million in 2025 dollars). (Note: Assets were $15.75 million in 1968 and $56 million ($431 million in 2025 dollars) in 1972.) By 1972, George Gund III and Albrecht Saalfield (Agnes Gund's husband) had joined the board of trustees, and by 1986 there were seven staff working alongside the executive director. The foundation made $45 million in grants from 1970 to 1981, and another $50 million in grants from 1982 to 1988.

Hawley E. Stark retired from the board of trustees in 1973, and Frederick K. Cox became the foundation's president. Geoffrey Gund joined the board in 1976. Henry C. Doll served as Acting Executive Director from Lipscomb's death until August 1988. He was succeeded as acting director in September 1988 by Richard M. Donaldson. David Bergholz, the assistant director of the Allegheny Conference on Economic Development, was named the new executive director in November 1988. He began his tenure in January 1989.

=== Berholz executive directorship ===
In 1990, The George Gund Foundation had assets of about $303.5 million ($748 million in 2025 dollars), and donated just over $11.9 million ($29.6 million in 2025 dollars) in grants that year alone.

Frederick K. Cox died in 1994, and Geoffrey Gund became president. At the time he assumed the presidency, The Gund Foundation had just two full-time staff and was making about $3.5 million ($7.6 million in 2025 dollars) in grants annually.

In the 1990s, The Gund Foundation gave $15 million ($30.8 million in 2025 dollars) to the Great Lakes Science Center to help construct its building. Made to help improve the city's cultural offerings in time for the city's bicentennial in 1996, it was the largest single grant in the foundation's history. By 2002, however, the foundation had given $25 million over several years to the Foundation Fighting Blindness. (Note: Gordon Gund developed retinitis pigmentosa in the 1960s and was blind by 1970. The Foundation Fighting Blindness does extensive research into retinitis pigmentosa.)

Catherine Gund, Agnes Gund's daughter, joined the board in 1998.

By 2002, The Gund Foundation's board of trustees had grown to eight. Six Gund family members were on the board of trustees, including newly appointed trustee Zachary Gund (Gordon's son). The foundation had also begun to expand its grantmaking to include boosting nonprofit organizations doing good work but which needed funds to reorganize, reorient, or merely overcome bad luck in order to survive. Combined with the recession that began in 2001, the foundation's endowment had shrunk slightly to $425 million ($761 million in 2025 dollars).

Bergholz retired at the end of 2002, and was succeeded by David Abbott, president of University Circle Inc. (Note: University Circle, Inc. is a nonprofit corporation which acts as an economic development organization, advocacy and lobbying agent, and area service provider for member institutions and businesses in Cleveland's University Circle neighborhood.) Abbott, a former Cuyahoga County administrator, worked closely with The Gund Foundation as executive director of the Rock and Roll Hall of Fame and as executive director of the Cleveland Bicentennial Commission.

=== Abbott executive directorship ===
In 2014, The George Gund Foundation joined Cuyahoga County in launching the nation's first county-level Pay for success (PFS) project aimed at reducing the amount of time children whose families are homeless stay in foster care.

In November 2019, Geoffrey Gund retired as president of The George Gund Foundation. The board elected Catherine Gund as his successor.

At the time of Geoffrey Gund's retirement, The Gund Foundation was awarding about $25 million ($31.5 million in 2025 dollars) in grants annually and had a staff of 12. The fund had distributed $722 million in grants during its history, $584 million of which came during Geoffrey Gund's tenure as president. With assets worth $486.9 million ($624 million in 2025 dollars) as of 2018, The George Gund Foundation was Cleveland's second-largest foundation, behind The Cleveland Foundation,

== Grantmaking ==
The George Gund Foundation's interests include: Arts, Economic Development and Community Revitalization, Education, Environment, and Human Services. The Foundation's focus is centered in Greater Cleveland, though a portion of the Foundation's grantmaking supports state and national policy making that bolsters its work locally. The Foundation only makes grants to 501(c)(3) organizations and to qualified government units and agencies.

== Bibliography ==
- Cigliano, Jan (1993). Showplace of America: Cleveland's Euclid Avenue, 1850-1910. Kent, Ohio: Kent State University Press. ISBN 9780873384452.
- Hammack, David C.; Smith, Stephen Rathgeb (2018). American Philanthropic Foundations: Regional Difference and Change. Bloomington, Ind.: Indiana University Press. ISBN 9780253032751.
- Keele, Harold M.; Kiger, Joseph C. (1984). Foundations. Westport, Conn.: Greenwood Press. ISBN 9780313225567.
- Maggard, Margaret (1993). Guide to Private Fortunes, 1993. Washington, D.C.: Taft Group. ISBN 9781879784291.
- Musson, Robert A. (2005). Brewing in Cleveland. Charleston, S.C.: Arcadia Publishing. ISBN 9780738539782.
- Okrent, Daniel (2010). Last Call: The Rise and Fall of Prohibition. New York: Scribner. ISBN 9780743277020.
- Silverman, Robert Mark; Patterson, Kelly L.; Yin, Li; Ranahan, Molly; Wu, Laiyun (2016). Affordable Housing in U.S. Shrinking Cities: From Neighborhoods of Despair to Neighborhoods of Opportunity?. Bristol, U.K.: Policy Press. ISBN 9781447327585.
