= George Gund II =

American businessman (1888–1966)

- Born: April 13, 1888; La Crosse, Wisconsin, U.S.
- Died: November 15, 1966 (aged 78); Cleveland, Ohio, U.S.
- Occupations: Businessman, philanthropost
- Spouse: Jessica Laidlaw Roesler (m. 1936; died 1954)
- Children: 6, including George III, Agnes, Gordon, and Graham

George Gund II (April 13, 1888 – November 15, 1966) was an American banker, business executive, and real estate investor who lived in Cleveland, Ohio, in the United States. He inherited his father's fortune and used a portion of it to purchase alien property seized during World War I. He sold this business at significant profit, and invested widely in banking, insurance, and real estate. Among his investments were a large number of shares in the then-small Cleveland Trust Company. Gund became a director of the bank in 1937 and president in 1941. He led the transformation of the institution into one of the largest banks in the United States. He retired as president in 1962, and was named chairman of the board of directors. A philanthropist for most of his life, he established The George Gund Foundation in 1952.

== Early life ==
Gund's grandfather, Johann Gund, was born in 1830 in Brühl am Rhein in the independent country of the Grand Duchy of Baden (now part of Germany). The family emigrated to the United States in 1848 and settled in Illinois, but in 1854 moved to La Crosse, Wisconsin. There he partnered with Gottlieb Heileman to form City Brewing Company. Differences in business philosophy led to a partnership split. This prompted the creation of the John Gund Brewery, and City Brewing was renamed for Heileman. His father, George Frederick Gund, was born in LaCrosse in 1856 and later managed the Gund Brewery. His father moved to Seattle, Washington, founded the Seattle Brewing and Malting Company, became a director of two banks, and then returned to the Midwest to move his family to Cleveland in 1897. His father bought the Jacob Mall Brewing Company, renamed it the Gund Brewing Company, and made a large fortune investing in banking, mining, and real estate.

George Gund Jr. (as he was then known) was born to George Frederick and Anna Louise (Metzger) Gund on April 13, 1888. He was a student at the University School of Cleveland from 1897 to 1905. He entered Harvard University, where he was a business manager of The Harvard Crimson and received his A.B. in 1909. Toward the end of his Harvard education, he simultaneously enrolled in the Harvard Business School, and graduated in the school's first class in 1909. He moved to Seattle and took a job as a clerk with the Seattle First National Bank, but moved back to Cleveland when his father died in 1916. But when World War I broke out, he enlisted in the United States Army and served in the Military Intelligence Division.

== Business career ==
After the start of prohibition in the United States in 1920, Gund was forced to close his father's brewery in Cleveland. But during the war, Kaffee HAG, a German corporation, was stripped of its assets in the United States. Among its subsidiaries was Sanka, the company which manufactured decaffeinated coffee. Gund purchased Sanka in 1919, then sold it to Kellogg's in 1927 for $10 million in stock. Gund also took over management of the Gund Realty Company in Cleveland and invested his money in numerous ventures. During the depths of the Great Depression, he purchased large amounts of stock at very low prices.

Gund studied animal husbandry at Iowa State University from 1922 to 1923. He made many trips to California and Nevada, often staying there for many months at a time, and became interested in a possible political career in Nevada.

In 1937, Gund was elected a director of the Cleveland Trust Company (a savings bank established in 1896), and was named president in 1941. He was made chairman of the board of trustees in 1962. Under Gund's leadership, by 1967 the bank had more than $2 billion in assets, making it the 18th largest bank in the United States. Gund also served on the board of directors of another 30 national and multinational corporations.

Gund was "extraordinarily conservative" when it came to business. Cleveland Trust dominated the city's investment capital decisions, and Gund strongly favored the provision of capital to heavy industry (like steelmaking) and oil refining. Urban renewal held little interest for him, and he considered public-private partnerships too risky.

== Philanthropic work and memorials ==
Gund became a frequent giver of large charitable gifts beginning in 1937. During his lifetime, he was a generous contributor to the Cleveland Institute of Art; Harvard University, where he endowed two professorships; Kenyon College; and Trinity Cathedral, an Episcopal church in Cleveland. In 1952, Gund established The George Gund Foundation. He divided his $200 million ($1.93 billion in 2025 dollars) fortune (Note: A number of sources claim Gund's fortune was actually $600 million. The New York Times mentioned an anecdote about Gund's $600 million fortune in a 1971 article. Robert A. Musson, a historian of the Cleveland brewing scene, wrote in 2005 that Gund was worth $600 million at the time of his death. The magazine Vanity Fair even claimed that Gund gave $600 million to the George Gund Foundation in 1952. Musson's claim is contradicted by the findings of the probate court, which found an estate worth just $25 million. The Vanity Fair claim is contradicted by tax reports the foundation made to the U.S. federal government, which showed only about a $24 million donation after Gund's death.) into three trusts during his lifetime. The foundation ended 1953 with $166,878 ($2,008,000 in 2025 dollars) in assets, but grew to about $30 million ($326,500,000 in 2025 dollars) in assets by 1960. Disbursement of funds to various causes left the George Gund Foundation with just $16.4 million ($170,200,000 in 2025 dollars) in assets by 1964. At Gund's death in November 1966, his estate was worth about $24.5 million ($243,800,000 in 2025 dollars) after the payment of debts and fees. The bulk of his estate went to the George Gund Foundation, whose assets rose to just over $40 million ($386,200,000 in 2025 dollars). (Note: $18.9 million of Gund's estate consisted of stock. According to The Plain Dealer newspaper, the largest holdings were $8.7 million of Kellogg's stock, $1.5 million in Traveler's Corp. stock, $1.15 million in Northern Life Insurance Company stock, and $1.05 million in Standard Oil stock.)

Gund served on the Board of Overseers of Harvard University, was a trustee of Kenyon College, and was a member of the advisory lay board of directors of John Carroll University. He also served two terms on the Advisory Council of the Fourth Federal Reserve District in the mid-1950s.

A number of buildings and places are named for Gund, due to his philanthropic efforts. Among these are: George Gund Hall at Harvard University Graduate School of Design, Gund Hall at Case Western Reserve University School of Law, and Gund Theater at the Berkeley Art Museum and Pacific Film Archive.

== Death ==
George Gund died of leukemia at the Cleveland Clinic on November 15, 1966. He was interred at Lake View Cemetery in Cleveland.

== Personal life ==
George Gund purchased a large cattle ranch in Nevada, and had a deep affection for the Old West. He used his income to collect a large number of works of art which depicted the American West, including works by Albert Bierstadt, Frederic Remington, and Charles Marion Russell.

In a New York Times article about Agnes Gund, Agnes addressed her father's personal life. "He didn't get married until he was 48 years old, Ms. Gund said, and there were whispers that he was gay. What Ms. Gund said she knew was that "he didn't like women so much, and I was one of those, so he didn't like me.' "

On May 23, 1936, he married Jessica Laidlaw Roesler (born June 21, 1903). She was the granddaughter of Henry Bedell Laidlaw, the founder of one of the first investment banking houses in New York City, Laidlaw & Company. Gund purchased a large home in Beachwood, a wealthy suburb of Cleveland, and the couple had six children: George III, Agnes, Gordon, Graham, Geoffrey, and Louise.

== Descendants ==
Gund distributed most of his fortune to his children through trusts during his lifetime. He provided for no substantial monetary distribution to his children in his will. His personal effects, such as art, automobiles, books, clothing, jewelry, and pictures, were bequeathed to his children, however. His Western art collection was appraised at $301,445 ($2,900,000 in 2025 dollars).

George Gund III and Gordon Gund formerly owned the Cleveland Cavaliers NBA team and the San Jose Sharks and Minnesota North Stars NHL teams.

In 1991, Agnes Gund was named president of the Museum of Modern Art in New York City. She stepped down in 2002.

Graham Gund is the founder and owner of Graham Gund Architects, an architectural design firm based in Cambridge, Massachusetts. An award-winning architect and noted art collector, he has designed numerous important buildings and residences, including the Shakespeare Theatre Company's Sidney Harman Hall in Washington, D.C., and overseen numerous redevelopment projects, such as the refurbishment of historic Faneuil Hall. He is also a trustee of the Museum of Fine Arts, Boston.

Geoffrey Gund taught at the Dalton School in New York City until his retirement in 2013 and was president of The George Gund Foundation until his retirement in 2019.

Louise Gund is a Tony Award-winning theater producer, environmentalist, women's activist, and philanthropist.

== Bibliography ==
- Adrain, Loren A. The Most Important Thing I Know About: Friendship, Family, Love, Faith, Kindness, Teaching, Success, Excellence, Leadership. Kansas City, Mo.: Andrews McMeel, 2001.
- Bethell, John T.; Hunt, Richard M.; and Shenton, Robert. Harvard A to Z. Cambridge, Mass.: Harvard University Press, 2004.
- The Big Book of Library Grant Money, 2004-2005. Detroit, Mich.: American Library Association, 2004.
- Davis, Jonathan T. Forbes Richest People: The Forbes Annual Profile of the World's Wealthiest Men and Women. New York: John Wiley & Sons, 1997.
- Foundation Reporter. Rockville, Md.: Taft Group, 2002.
- Fund Raiser's Guide to Private Fortunes. Washington, D.C.: Taft Group, 1988.
- Gund, Geoffrey. The Gund Collection of Western Art: A History and Pictorial Description of the American West. Cleveland: Gund Collection, 1973.
- Helfand, Harvey Zane. University of California, Berkeley: An Architectural Tour and Photographs. New York: Princeton Architectural Press, 2002.
- Keele, Harold M. and Kiger, Joseph C. Foundations. Westport, Conn.: Greenwood Press, 1984.
- Haller, Charles R. German-American Business Biographies: High Finance and Big Business. Asheville, N.C.: Money Tree Imprints, 2001.
- Law School Admission Council. The Official Guide to U.S. Law Schools. Newtown, Pa.: Law School Admission Council/Law School Admission Services, 1987.
- Musson, Robert A. Brewing in Cleveland. Charleston, S.C.: Arcadia, 2005.
- Rutherford, Roy. Boys Grown Tall: A Story of American Initiative. Cleveland: Cleveland Plain Dealer, 1944.
- Van Tassel, David D. and Grabowski, John J. The Encyclopedia of Cleveland History. Bloomington, Ind.: Indiana University Press, 1987.
