= Lowry Center =

Sports complex in Gambier, Ohio

Coordinates: 40°22′14″N 82°23′34″W

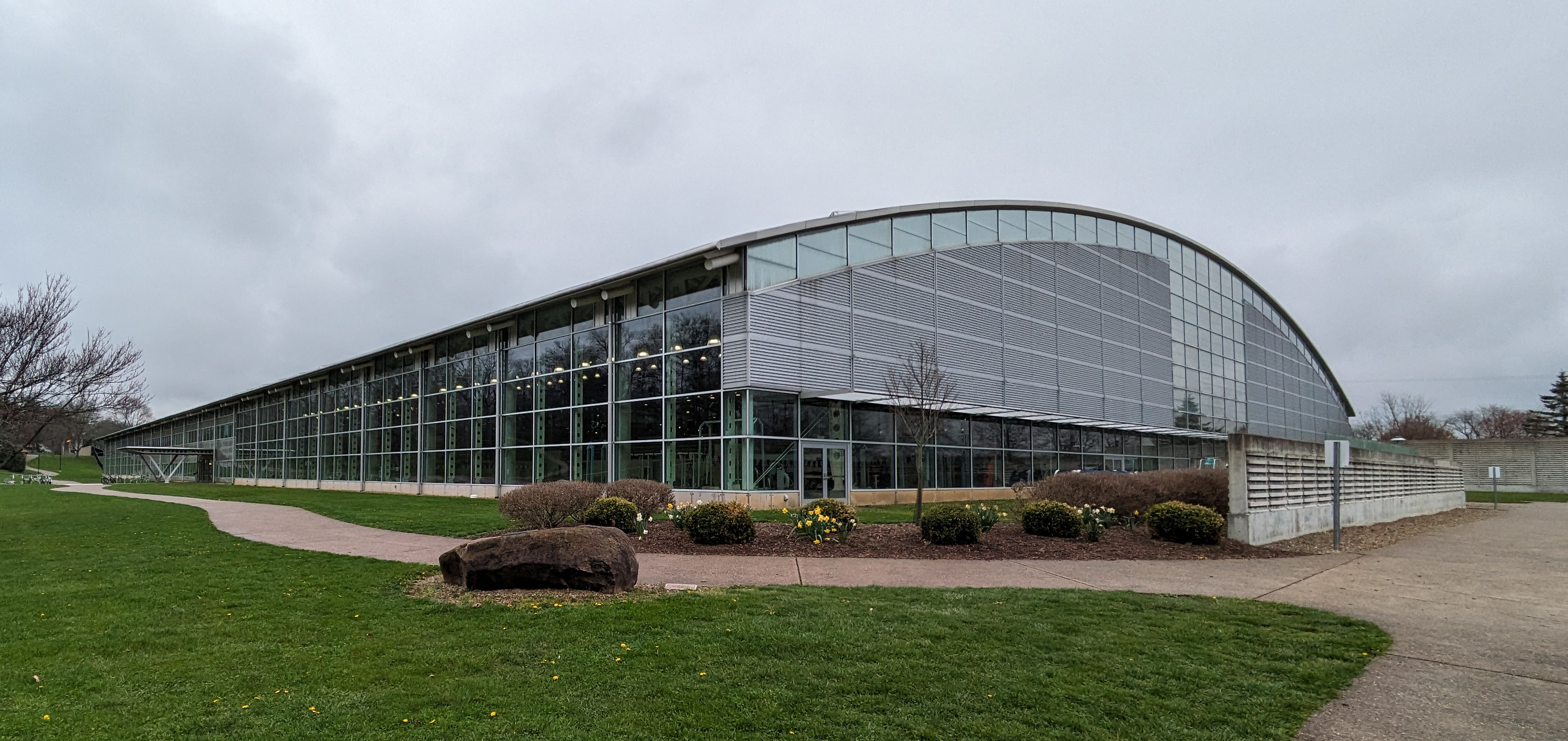
- Exterior view of the facility in 2024
- Interactive map of Lowry Center
- Full name: William E. Lowry Center
- Former names: Kenyon Athletic Center
- Address: Gambier, OH; U.S.
- Owner: Kenyon College
- Operator: Kenyon College Athletics
- Type: Arena
- Current use: Basketball; Squash; Swimming; Tennis; Track and field

Construction
- Opened: 2006; 20 years ago

Website
- kenyon.edu/lowry-center

The Lowry Center (formerly Kenyon Athletic Center) is an athletic center and student union serving the Kenyon College and Gambier village communities in Ohio. It was designed by architect Graham Gund and opened to the public on 25 January 2006. The facility cost approximately $70 million to build.

The center was named after William E. Lowry Jr., who served on Kenyon’s Board of Trustees for more than 30 years. Lowry also captained the football, baseball, and basketball teams and presided the student body.

== Planning and construction ==
Plans were begun in 2001 for an athletic center to replace the then-outdated Ernst Center and Wertheimer Fieldhouse that had previously served Kenyon College. The building was originally intended to be called the Fitness, Recreation, and Athletic facility (FRA). Designs were made in collaboration with coaches and other athletics personnel, such as swimming coach Jim Steen, who was consulted while making designs for the "state-of-the-art" natatorium.

The KAC was built on the south end of Kenyon's campus, over the site of the former Wertheimer Fieldhouse, which was demolished to make way for the new facility. Construction began in 2003 and the facility was first opened to the public on 25 January 2006, two semesters after the originally projected date of completion (May 2005) and almost three years after the beginning of construction.

== Architecture and features ==
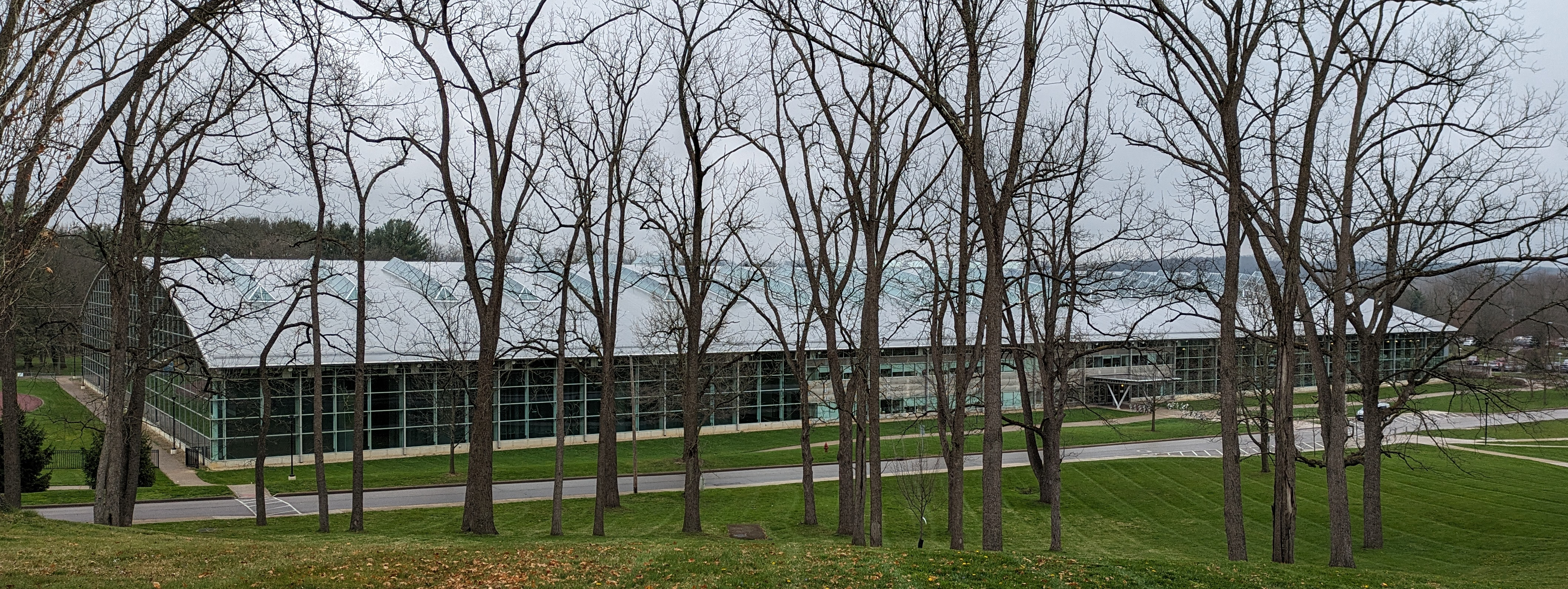
Side view

The athletic center consists of a hangar-like structure approximately 540 feet (160 m) long and 300 feet (91 m) wide, or 265,000 square feet (24,600 m^{2}) in total, with an arching roof supported by concrete columns in the center of the building and along the perimeter. A frequently noted feature of the building is the use of glass to create an "open" feel and provide natural lighting—most of the outer wall is made of baffled glass panels. There is also integratedness between the different areas of the facility: most interior walls do not reach the ceiling, making it possible to see and hear activities in other parts of the building.

A key feature of the building is its natatorium, which serves as the principal training for the "Owls" Kenyon swimming team (formerly the "Lords" and "Ladies"; the Lords won 31 consecutive NCAA Division III championships, making them the team with the most NCAA titles in any sport, and the Ladies have won 23 (nonconsecutive) titles. The natatorium includes an olympic-size swimming pool with a "state-of-the-art regenerative media filter" (which, it has been claimed, saves 600,000 gallons of water a year), and is climate-controlled and hermetically sealed off from the rest of the facility.

The glass walls of the facility also play an important role in heating and regulating the temperature of the building: the glass panels have reflective coatings that control the entry of heat into the building, and are made up of two panes separated by a pocket of air which, along with the air between the glass panels and the interior sound baffling, are meant to help insulate the building and preserve energy. According to Calvin Frost, chairman of the Channeled Resources Group, Kenyon students placed a high value on ecological friendliness when sharing their attitudes about the KAC.

In addition to its natatorium, the KAC includes a 200-meter indoor athletics track, tennis courts, and a basketball arena. As one of the primary goals of the building's design was to cater to recreational users and the student community in addition to varsity athletes, it also includes a 12,000-square-foot (1,100 m^{2}) weight and fitness room, a multi-purpose athletic court for intramural sports and community use, squash courts, dance studios, conference rooms, a movie theater, and a small café.

== Recognition ==
The facility has been widely praised for its architectural design, and has won several awards. It won the 2007 Facilities of Merit award from Athletic Business magazine, the New England AIA Merit Award for Design Excellence, and the Boston Society of Architects Honor Award, and was nominated for the 2007 Court of the Year award from the American Sports Builders Association. On the other hand, it has also received some criticism for its high cost.

== Use in 2007 Will Graham celebration ==
From 5 to 7 October 2007, the KAC was rented out to Will Graham of the Billy Graham Evangelistic Association for the 2007 Will Graham Celebration, which was attended by approximately 5,000 people. The event was met with some controversy among the mostly liberal–progressive Kenyon College community, as Graham's son Franklin Graham had been accused of making discriminatory anti-Islamic statements; numerous students and faculty called the choice to host the event "inappropriate" and criticized Kenyon's administration for having allowed it.

Several weeks before the Celebration, about 300 residents of Knox County, Ohio, in which Kenyon is located, gathered near the Kenyon Athletic Center for a "Surround the KAC" event to "form a shield of protection" around the property in preparation for the Celebration. The event was also intended as an outreach to the non-Christian community. In order to avoid trespassing on college property, the group used the public roads around the athletic facility to surround and "bath[e] the building in prayer".
