= Graham Gund =

American architect (1940–2025)

- Born: Graham de Conde Gund; October 28, 1940; Cleveland, Ohio, U.S.
- Died: June 6, 2025 (aged 84); Cambridge, Massachusetts, U.S.
- Education: Kenyon College (BA); Rhode Island School of Design; Harvard University (MArch, MDes)
- Known for: Architecture; philanthropy
- Spouse: Ann Gund (m. 1984)
- Parent(s): George Gund II; Jessica Laidlaw Gund
- Family: Agnes, Gordon, George III (siblings)

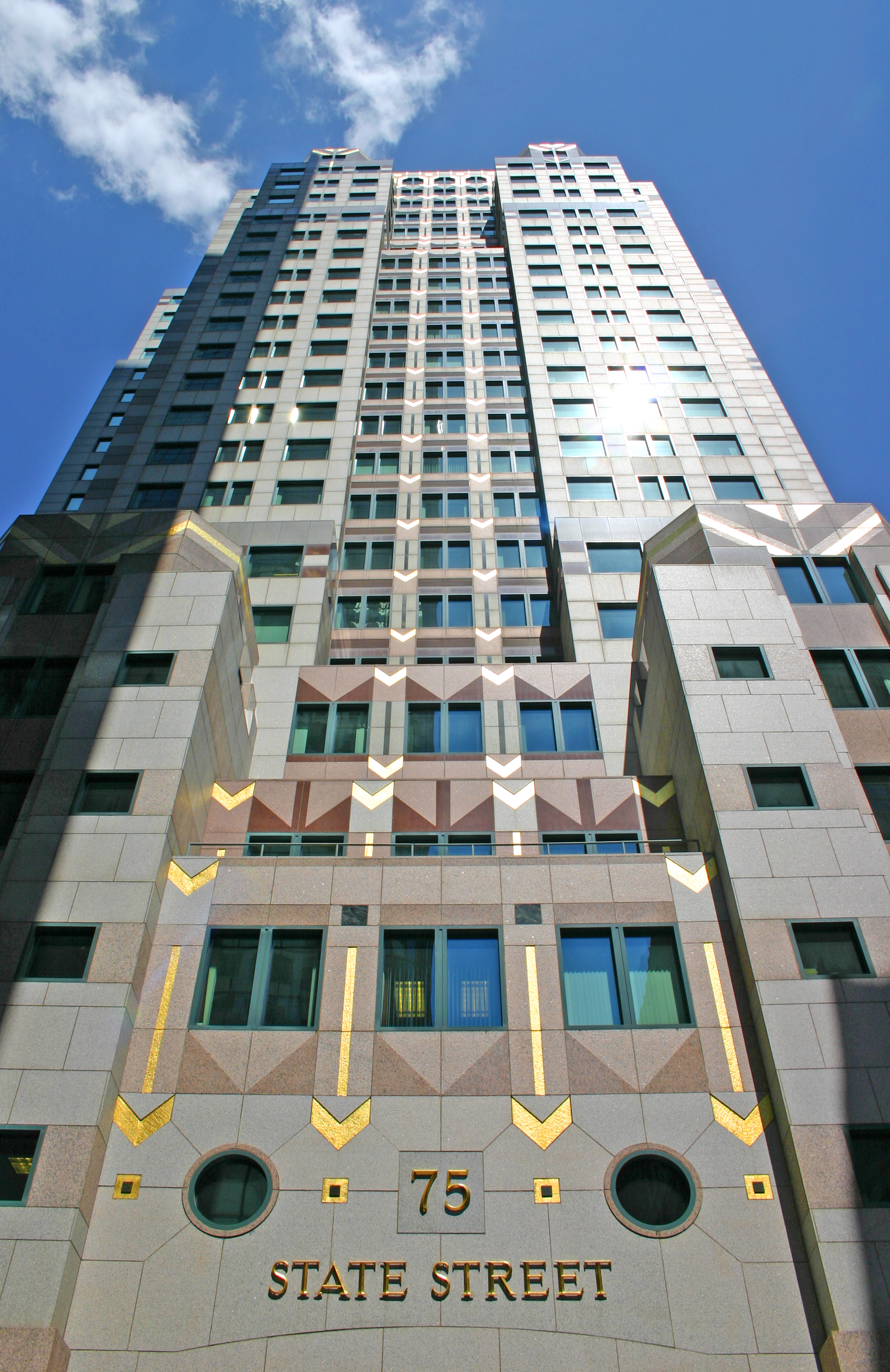
75 State Street, Boston, designed by the Gund Partnership with SOM

Graham de Conde Gund (October 28, 1940 – June 6, 2025) was an American architect and the president of the Gund Partnership, an American architecture firm based in Cambridge, Massachusetts, and founded by Gund in 1971. An heir to George Gund II, he was also a collector of contemporary art, whose collection was widely exhibited and published.

A native of Cleveland, Ohio, born on October 28, 1940, Gund was educated at Westminster School (Connecticut), Kenyon College, and the Rhode Island School of Design. Gund graduated from the Harvard University Graduate School of Design, with a Master of Architecture degree in 1968 and a Master of Urban Design degree in 1969. Graham Gund was one of six children of George Gund II, the onetime chairman of the Cleveland Trust Company, philanthropist and namesake for the Graduate School of Design's George Gund Hall, completed in 1971. His siblings are George III b. 1937; Agnes b. 1938; Gordon b. 1939; Geoffrey b.1942; and Louise b. 1944.

After graduation, Gund worked at The Architects' Collaborative in Cambridge, Massachusetts. Gund himself undertook property development for a number of his firm's projects. He was also a noted collector of art. Gund funded the Gund Gallery at the Museum of Fine Arts in Boston. Gund was also the driving force behind the founding of the Gund Gallery at Kenyon College. He designed the museum's building, a LEED Silver-certified project that garnered multiple architectural awards. With his wife Ann, he gave a substantial gift of over 80 modern and contemporary artworks to start the museum's permanent collection.

== Architecture ==
After working with modern architect Walter Gropius at the Architects' Collaborative, Gund began his career with significant projects that drew from a modernist vocabulary. The Hyatt Regency Cambridge, with its stepped massing, recalled legendary projects by architects Adolf Loos and Henri Sauvage, while utilizing red brick characteristic of Cambridge's collegiate river-side architecture. For Boston's Institute for Contemporary Art, Gund created an unexpected, open, angular interior that played against the rigid geometry of a historic Richardsonian Romanesque building.

The firm became well known during the 1980s for extending this creative take on architecture through significant national projects, some of which were prominent adaptive uses while others were new buildings. Additional museums and education buildings represented the continued expansion of Gund's practice in these years. Among the adaptive uses was the Norwalk Maritime Center in Connecticut, a museum and aquarium project housed in a salvaged iron works complex, with a new IMAX theater. New institutional buildings included major structures for Plimoth Plantation in Plymouth, Massachusetts, and for the Fernbank Museum of Natural History in Atlanta.

At this time, Gund played a role as both architect and developer to reclaim threatened or damaged historic buildings, as in the Church Court Condominiums in Boston and Bulfinch Square in Cambridge. Such activity even led to his being described by Vincent Scully as a "convinced preservationist," comparing Gund to Charles Bulfinch.

Among Gund's early work was the Rockefeller residence in Cambridge (1973), the Hyatt Regency Cambridge (1976) and the former Institute for Contemporary Art, now the Boston Architectural College (1976). Much of Gund's work in this period involved renovations or residential adaptive reuse projects in the Boston area. Other projects included the Johnston Guardhouse at Harvard Yard (1983), adaptive reuse of an ironworks building for the Maritime Aquarium at Norwalk (1988), and the Art Deco Revival 31-story 75 State Street (also known as the Fleet Bank Center), Boston (1989), in association with Skidmore, Owings and Merrill. In the 1990s, Gund's work expanded to include considerable work with Disney Company in Florida and Paris. Gund was featured on This Old House in 1992 as the architect for the television show's Igoe Residence project. By the 2000s, Gund's work was primarily focused on school and university projects.

== Recent work ==
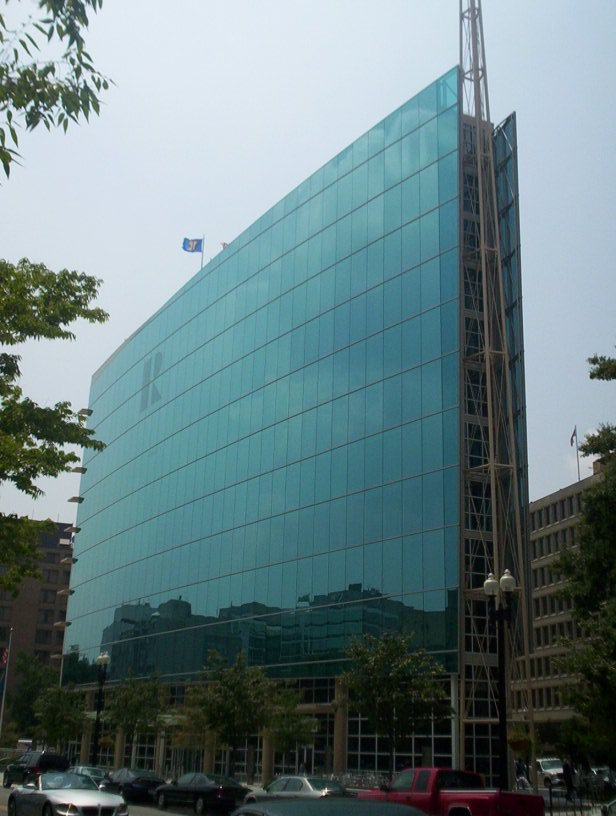
National Association of Realtors Headquarters, Washington, D.C.

Recent notable buildings designed by the firm include the headquarters for the National Association of Realtors in Washington, D.C., occupying a prominent location on New Jersey Avenue, the conservatory for the Cleveland Botanical Garden, the Lansburgh Theater for the Folger Shakespeare Library in Washington, DC, The Fannie Cox Math and Science Center for Friends' Central School in Wynnewood, PA, the synagogue building for Young Israel of Brookline, Massachusetts, the Kenyon Athletic Center, and buildings on many American college campuses, including those of Harvard University, Denison University, and Kenyon College. Gund also designed the Boston Ballet Headquarters on Clarendon Street in Boston, Massachusetts.

Gund died after a heart attack in Cambridge, Massachusetts, on June 6, 2025, at the age of 84.

== Work for Disney ==
Gund designed a number of projects in the Disney Company's planned community of Celebration, Florida, noted for a high concentration of work by major architectural firms invited by Disney.

- Coronado Springs Resort, Walt Disney World, Florida (design architect)
- Celebration Hotel and Celebration High School

Other work by Gund for Disney includes the International Retail and Manufacturers' Showcase at Euro Disney.

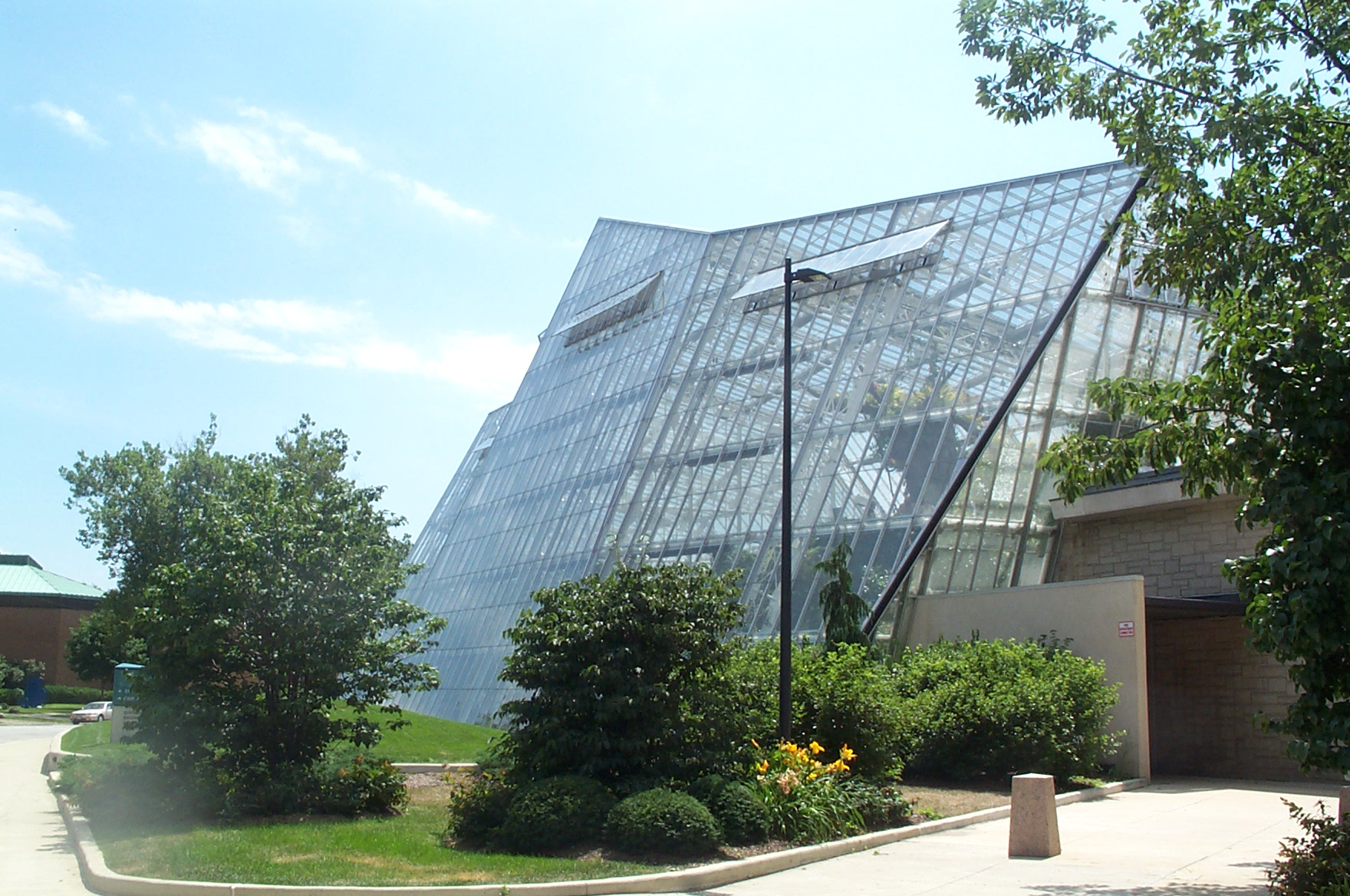
Eleanor Armstrong Smith Glasshouse, Cleveland Botanical Gardens

== Publications ==
Gund's work was widely published throughout his career, with articles by major critics in national publications. The firm's architecture has been the subject of two books: Gund Partnership 1994-2007, with an extensive foreword by New York Times architecture critic Paul Goldberger, and Graham Gund Architects, published in 1993, with an introduction by Vincent Scully.

He was married to Ann Gund née Landreth, with whom he had one son, Graydon. He was a Fellow of the American Institute of Architects.

== Additional projects ==
- Church Court Condominiums, Boston (1983) - re-modelled Mt. Vernon Church, corner Beacon St. + Massachusetts Ave., developed by Gund
- Bostix Kiosk, Copley Square, Boston (1992)
- Kenyon Athletic Center, Ohio (built 2006)
- Newton North High School, Massachusetts (built 2010)
- Armour Academic Center, Westminster School
- Armstrong Dining Hall, Westminster School

The firm is also known for historic redevelopment projects including Bulfinch Square in Cambridge, Massachusetts. Major museum projects include the Plimoth Plantation Visitor Center in Plymouth, Massachusetts, and the Fernbank Museum of Natural History in Atlanta, Georgia.

== Bibliography ==
- Gund Partnership 1994-2007, Mahar, Christa, ed., Mulgrave, Australia.: Images Publishing Group, 2008. ISBN 978-1-86470-273-6, introduction by Paul Goldberger
- Rapaport, Richard. Graham Gund Architects: American Institute of Architects Press, 1993. ISBN 978-1-55835-093-9, introduction by Vincent Scully
