= Ted Stepien =

American sports businessman (1925–2007)

- Born: Theodore John Stepien; June 9, 1925; Pittsburgh, Pennsylvania, U.S.
- Died: September 10, 2007 (aged 82); Cleveland, Ohio, U.S.
- Occupations: businessman, sports franchise owner, entrepreneur
- Years active: 1980–83 as owner of the Cleveland Cavaliers; 2003–07 as Founder and Commissioner of the United Pro Basketball League

Theodore John Stepien (June 9, 1925 – September 10, 2007) was an American businessman who owned the Cleveland Cavaliers of the National Basketball Association (NBA) from 1980 to 1983. Born in Pittsburgh in 1925, he became wealthy as the founder of Nationwide Advertising Service and purchased an interest in the Cavaliers on April 12, 1980. His tenure as owner of the Cavs was highly controversial, resulting in multiple coaching changes and poor performances by the team, and his management decisions ultimately led the NBA to create what is known as the "Ted Stepien rule" to restrict how teams can trade draft picks. A December 6, 1982, article in The New York Times described the Cavaliers during Stepien's ownership as "the worst club and most poorly run franchise in professional basketball." After selling his interest in the Cavaliers in 1983, he continued to be involved in professional basketball, owning teams in the Continental Basketball Association and the Global Basketball Association. Later in life he founded the United Pro Basketball League, along other business ventures in the Cleveland area. He died in 2007.

== History ==
Stepien began Nationwide Advertising Service in 1947 with just $500. By 1980, it was generating over $80 million a year.

=== Professional softball ===
During the late 1970s and early 1980s, several men's professional softball leagues were formed in the United States to build on the growth and talent in the booming men's amateur game during this period.

The American Professional Slo-Pitch League (APSPL) was the first such league, launching in an era of experimentation in professional sports leagues. The APSPL was formed in 1977 by former World Football League front-office staffer Bill Byrne, with former New York Yankees star Whitey Ford as commissioner and owners such as Mike Ilitch with his Detroit Caesars club. Stepien bought the Cleveland Jaybirds franchise for the 1978 APSPL season, changing the name to the Cleveland Stepien's Competitors in 1979. In 1980, two teams, Milwaukee and Cleveland broke away to form the North American Softball League (NASL) under the leadership of Stepien, who owned six of the eight teams in the new league (only Ft. Wayne and Milwaukee had local ownership), while the APSPL continued with just six teams. The NASL lasted one season. In 1980, Stepien held a promotional event for the league in Cleveland in which he dropped softballs from the 52nd floor of Terminal Tower to be caught by outfielders from his Cleveland Competitors team. The balls were estimated to be traveling at 144 mph by the time they reached the street, damaging cars and injuring several spectators. One was caught.

In 1981, the APSPL merged with NASL to create the United Professional Softball League (UPSL), but only the Milwaukee franchise came from the NASL to the new league as the other NASL teams folded. The merged league competed for two years and Stepien fielded the Cleveland Competitors again in the 1982 UPSL season. The UPSL disbanded after the 1982 season, ending the pro era of men's softball.

=== NBA owner ===
Stepien initially bought 200,000 shares for $2 million to give him a 38% interest in the Cavaliers in mid-1980. Over the next few months, Stepien continued until he eventually acquired 82% control of the team.

On the court, Stepien installed Bill Musselman as the team's head coach. Musselman, who coached the University of Minnesota to the 1972 Big Ten championship, the school's first in 53 years, compiled a 25–46 record with the Cavs before Stepien fired him.

In an interview in December 1980, Stepien said, "No team should be all white and no team should be all black, either. That's what bothers me about the NBA: You've got a situation here where blacks represent little more than 5 percent of the market, yet most teams are at least 75 percent black and the New York Knicks are 100 percent black. Teams with that kind of makeup can't possibly draw from a suitable cross section of fans." He also said that "blacks don't buy many tickets and they don't buy many of the products advertised on TV. Let's face it, running an NBA team is like running any other business and those kind of factors have to be considered." He described his Cavaliers at that time — consisting of six whites and five blacks — as "a balanced team racially, and that's a good reflection on our society because it's balanced too." He described himself as "really big on desegregation" and "for a totally integrated society."

By 1981, Stepien's popularity in Cleveland was at an all-time low. The team was referred to locally and derisively at this time as the "Cleveland Cadavers". For the final home game of the 1981 season, the largest Cavaliers crowd in two years showed up to honor fired play by play announcer Joe Tait and heap abuse on the Cavs' now-despised owner. The angry crowd used the occasion to not only show support for Tait, but also to voice their discontent over the fact that Stepien was staying behind to run the team.

Over the course of the 1981–82 season alone, Stepien fired three head coaches and hired four: Don Delaney, who had taken over for Musselman with 11 games remaining in the 1980–81 season; assistant coach Bob Kloppenburg, who filled in for a game after Stepien relieved Delaney of his duties; Chuck Daly, who left the Philadelphia 76ers where he had been an assistant to take over as head coach of the Cavs, who went 9–32 with him at the helm; and Musselman, who returned to the bench after serving as the team's director of player personnel since being fired the previous season.

At one point, the Cavs had traded away five consecutive first-round picks, covering 1982 until 1986. The NBA thereafter instituted the "Stepien Rule", which states that a team (usually) cannot trade its first-round pick in consecutive years.

After Stepien dealt away several 1st round draft picks to the Dallas Mavericks, who were a newly formed expansion team, in November 1980, the NBA froze Cleveland's trading rights to prevent him from giving up the team's picks for the rest of the 1980s and 1990s. The freeze was only in place for one season, being officially ended after the 1981–82 season, but all trades required the approval of the league's director of operations, Joe Axelson.

Musselman explained that Stepien "wanted a playoff team right away, and that's what he kept talking about." Stepien admitted that "We made mistakes, and I take the responsibility."

During his ownership, attendance at Cavaliers games began to sharply fall due to the team's poor play and Stepien's questionable moves. Stepien thought about renaming the team the "Ohio Cavaliers" and playing portions of its home schedule in nearby non-NBA cities such as Pittsburgh, Cincinnati, and Toronto to increase the fan base. He had also threatened to move the team to Toronto and rename them the Toronto Towers. He signed a deal to sell his majority interest in the Cavaliers to George and Gordon Gund for $20 million on April 7, 1983. His Nationwide Advertising Service Inc. and new cable television station Sports Exchange were also part of the sale. The transaction was approved by the NBA Board of Governors one month later on May 9. The league also arranged for the Gunds to pay a cash sum for a first-round selection in each of the subsequent four NBA drafts to recover the ones traded away by Stepien. The Gunds elected to keep the team in Cleveland (12 years later, Toronto would get an NBA team via expansion when the Raptors began play). During his tenure as Cavaliers owner, the Cavaliers went 66–180, had five different coaches, and had losses of $15 million (about $45 million in 2023).

=== After the NBA ===
After selling the Cavs, Stepien became founding owner of the Toronto Tornados in the Continental Basketball Association. He also owned a team in the Global Basketball Association, which operated during the early 1990s. In 1987, he was fined $50,000 by the CBA after allegedly failing to cooperate with the league office's investigation of salary cap violations.

Early in 2003, Stepien founded the United Pro Basketball League (UPBL), which featured just four teams, including three in Kentucky (Lexington, Louisville, and Frankfort) and one in Mansfield, Ohio. Stepien also opened a series of private dining rooms called "Competitors Clubs" in Cleveland. His professional softball teams were named Competitors to promote the restaurants.

Stepien died of a heart attack in 2007.

Sporting positions
Preceded by Nick Mileti	Cleveland Cavaliers owner 1980–1983	Succeeded by Gordon Gund
