= Agnes Gund =

American philanthropist (1938–2025)

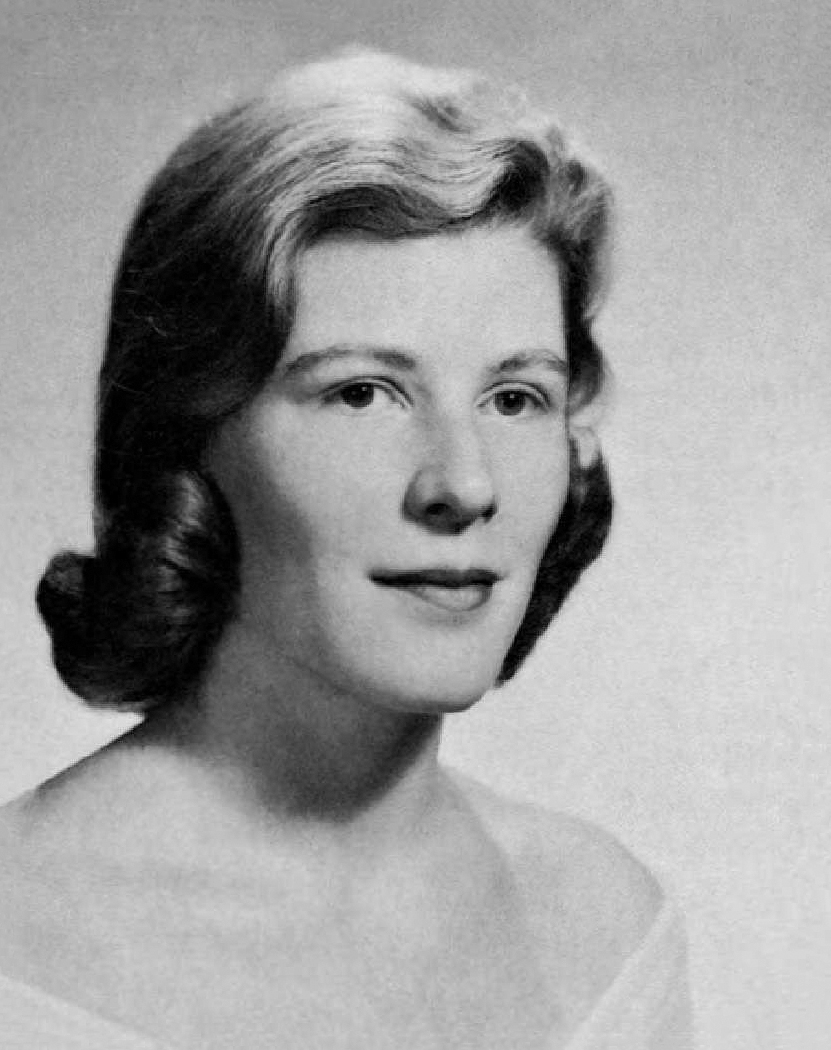
- Gund in 1960
- Born: August 13, 1938; Cleveland, Ohio, U.S.
- Died: September 18, 2025 (aged 87); New York City, U.S.
- Education: Connecticut College (BA); Harvard University (MA)
- Spouses: Albrecht Saalfield (m. 1963; div. 1981); Daniel Shapiro (m. 1987, divorced)
- Children: 4, including Catherine
- Father: George Gund II
- Relatives: George Gund III (brother); Gordon Gund (brother); Graham Gund (brother)

Agnes Gund (August 13, 1938 – September 18, 2025) was an American philanthropist, arts patron, art collector, and arts education and social justice advocate. She was President Emerita and Life Trustee of the Museum of Modern Art and Chairman of its International Council. She was a board member of MoMA PS1. In 1977, in response to New York City budget cuts to arts education in public schools, Gund founded Studio in a School, a nonprofit that engages professional artists as art instructors in public schools and community-based organizations.

== Early life and education ==
Gund was born in Cleveland, Ohio, on August 13, 1938, to Jessica Roesler Gund, and George Gund II. Her father was president of Cleveland Trust; her mother, who died in 1954, had managed their home, and instilled in Agnes an appreciation for art (including through visits to and classes at the Cleveland Museum of Art).

Agnes was the second oldest of six children. Her brothers, Gordon and George would go on to become partners in Gund Investment and owners of the NHL and NBA teams; Her brother Graham would become an architect, brother Geoff a teacher of economics and American history, and her sister, Louise, a Tony Award–winning theatrical producer.

Gund developed her interest in art, after the death of her mother, when she became a 15-year-old student at Miss Porter's School in Farmington, Connecticut. "I had a magical art history teacher who didn't just give you the artist's name and the date of the picture, she showed you how to look at artwork," Gund said. Later, Gund attended Connecticut College for Women, where she received a bachelor's degree in history in 1960. She later continued her studies with graduate work in art history, and received a master's degree from Harvard in 1980.

== Career ==
Gund joined MoMA's International Council in 1967; she then joined the board of trustees in 1976 and served as its president from 1991 until 2002. She served on the boards of the Cleveland Museum of Art, the Frick Collection, and the Morgan Library and Museum. She was co-founder and Chair Emerita of the Center for Curatorial Leadership and was an Honorary Trustee of YoungArts, Independent Curators International, and the Museum of Contemporary Art, Cleveland.

She was active in arts advocacy, education policy, women’s initiatives, and environmental programs, serving on numerous cultural and nonprofit boards of organizations such as the Aaron Diamond AIDS Research Center, the Andy Warhol Foundation, the Barnes Foundation, Chess in the Schools, the Foundation for Contemporary Arts, the Fund for Public Schools, the J. Paul Getty Trust, and the Robert Rauschenberg Foundation.

=== Philanthropic activities ===
==== Art for Justice Fund ====
In January 2017, Gund sold Roy Lichtenstein's Masterpiece in order to provide $100 million in seed funding for the Art for Justice Fund, which supports criminal justice reform and seeks to reduce mass incarceration in the United States. Gund described Michelle Alexander's 2010 book The New Jim Crow: Mass Incarceration in the Age of Colorblindness and Ava DuVernay's 2016 documentary 13th about African-Americans in the prison system as motivators for starting the fund, as well as concern for her grandchildren, six of whom are Black.

==== Studio in a School ====
In 1977, in response to public-school arts education budget cuts in New York City, Gund founded Studio in a School, a nonprofit that places professional artists as art teachers in public schools and community organizations. Studio in a School has provided visual art instruction led by professional artists to over one million students in over 800 schools and community-based organizations throughout the five boroughs of New York City. Every year, more than 100 professional artists spend some 45,000 hours with over 32,000 pre-K through high school students, often in schools that would otherwise lack visual arts instruction. About 90 percent of all children who participate in Studio programs come from low-income families. By 2018, the Studio Institute had provided expanded programming in five cities: Boston, Philadelphia, Providence, Cleveland, and Memphis. In 2017, Studio in a School received the National Arts Award for Arts Education from Americans for the Arts.

== Art collecting ==
Gund's vast collection of modern and contemporary art from the 1940s through the present ranges from modern masters, including Richard Artschwager, John Baldessari, Lynda Benglis, Lee Bontecou, James Lee Byars, Vija Celmins, Eva Hesse, Arshile Gorky, Jasper Johns, Ellsworth Kelly, Wolfgang Laib, Roy Lichtenstein, Martin Puryear, Robert Rauschenberg, Mark Rothko, Richard Serra, and Frank Stella; through cutting-edge contemporary artists, such as Teresita Fernandez, Kara Walker, Lorna Simpson, Cai Guo-Qiang, Glenn Ligon, and David Remfry.

Her collection included works on paper alongside paintings, sculptures, photographs, prints, and furniture, particularly noted for its extensive holdings of drawings from post-war and contemporary artists. She donated hundreds of works to MoMA and numerous additional pieces to institutions such as the Cleveland Museum of Art, while other items from her collection were loaned to museums across the United States. Essentially all of her most valuable works that have not already been given are promised gifts to institutions.

== Awards and recognition ==
In 1997, Gund received the National Medal of Arts from President Bill Clinton. A year later, she received the Golden Plate Award of the American Academy of Achievement. In 2011, Hillary Clinton honored Gund with the Foundation for Art and Preservation in Embassies' Leonore and Walter Annenberg Award for Diplomacy through the Arts, and in doing so, listed Gund's 23 charitable board and committee appointments (at that time). Also in 2011, President Barack Obama named Gund to the board of trustees of the National Council on the Arts. In 2016, Gund was elected Honorary Fellow of the Royal Academy of Arts. In 2018, she was awarded the J. Paul Getty Medal.

On February 14, 2020, Gund received the first Justice Ruth Bader Ginsburg Woman of Leadership Award of the Dwight D. Opperman Foundation, which was presented by Justice Ginsburg. In October 2022, Gund received the W. E. B. Du Bois Medal, the highest honor given by Harvard University in the field of African and African American studies.

Gund received honorary doctorate degrees from Hamilton College (1994), Case Western Reserve University (1995), Brown University (1996), Kenyon College (1996), the University of Illinois (2002), the CUNY Graduate Center (2007), Bowdoin College (2012), and the University of the Arts (2021).

== Media features ==
In May 2025, Gund was featured in The New Yorker's photojournalism piece "Power Houses: Inside the Living Rooms of Notable New Yorkers".

== Personal life ==
From 1963 until their 1981 divorce, Gund was married to Albrecht ‘Brec’ Saalfield, an heir to the Saalfield Publishing Company of Akron, Ohio. They had four children: David, Catherine, Jessica, and Anna. In 1987, Gund married attorney and university teacher Daniel Shapiro, though they later divorced.

Gund died at her Manhattan home on September 18, 2025, at the age of 87, leaving a legacy of arts philanthropy and advocacy documented in national media obituaries.
