= George Gund III =

American businessman and sports entrepreneur (1937–2013)

- Born: May 7, 1937; Cleveland, Ohio, US
- Died: January 15, 2013 (aged 75); Palm Springs, California
- Known for: Co-ownership Cleveland Cavaliers (1983–2005); San Jose Sharks (1990–2002)
- Spouse: Iara Lee (?-2013; his death)
- Parent(s): George Gund II; Jessica Laidlaw Roesler
- Relatives: Agnes Gund (sister); Gordon Gund (brother); Graham Gund (brother)

George Gund III (May 7, 1937 – January 15, 2013) was an American businessman and sports entrepreneur.

== Biography ==
Gund III was born in Cleveland, Ohio on May 7, 1937, to Jessica Roesler and George Gund II, a powerful banker in Cleveland. A high-school dropout, Gund joined the United States Marines in 1955 when he was 18 years old. His early years in the Marines brought him to the city of San Francisco, California, where he soon took up residence.

After his military service, Gund attended Menlo College in Atherton, California, but never graduated. He instead began bringing in Eastern European films and distributing them around San Francisco and the US, using his membership in the San Francisco Film Society as a catalyst.

Gund was also dedicated to the world of sports. Earlier NHL-related business involvements included terms as president of the Cleveland Barons, chairman of the Minnesota North Stars, and partner with the California Golden Seals and the San Jose Sharks. Gund was also a member of the International Council of USA Hockey, a chairman and trustee of the U.S. Hockey Hall of Fame, and a trustee of the USA Hockey Foundation.

He and his younger brother Gordon purchased majority interest in the Cleveland Cavaliers from Ted Stepien for $20 million on April 7, 1983. Stepien's Nationwide Advertising Service, Inc. and new cable television station Sports Exchange were also part of the sale. The transaction was approved by the National Basketball Association (NBA) Board of Governors one month later on May 9. The league also arranged for the Gunds to pay a cash sum for a first-round selection in each of the subsequent four NBA drafts to recover the ones traded away by Stepien.

While married to Iara Lee, Gund produced many of her films, including most recently Cultures of Resistance, along with earlier films Synthetic Pleasures and Modulations. He was President of Caipirinha Productions, which produces Lee's films and, along with Lee, also founded the Iara Lee and George Gund III Foundation, which is involved with "philanthropy, voluntarism and grantmaking." In 1989 he was a member of the jury at the 16th Moscow International Film Festival.

Gund died on January 15, 2013, at the age of 75 after a lengthy battle with stomach cancer.
