= Cleveland Cavaliers =

National Basketball Association team in Cleveland, Ohio

- 2026–27 Cleveland Cavaliers season
- Conference: Eastern
- Division: Central
- Founded: 1970
- History: Cleveland Cavaliers; 1970–present
- Arena: Rocket Arena
- Location: Cleveland, Ohio
- Team colors: Wine, gold, black
- Main sponsor: Cleveland-Cliffs
- CEO: Nic Barlage
- President: Koby Altman
- General manager: Brandon Weems
- Head coach: Kenny Atkinson
- Ownership: Dan Gilbert (majority); Gary Gilbert (minority); Usher Raymond (minority); Myles Garrett (minority)
- Affiliation: Cleveland Charge
- Championships: 1 (2016)
- Conference titles: 5 (2007, 2015, 2016, 2017, 2018)
- Division titles: 8 (1976, 2009, 2010, 2015, 2016, 2017, 2018, 2025)
- Retired numbers: 7 (7, 11, 22, 25, 34, 42, 43)
- Website: nba.com/cavaliers
Association	Icon	Statement
City

The Cleveland Cavaliers, often referred to as the Cavs, are an American professional basketball team based in Cleveland. The Cavaliers compete in the National Basketball Association (NBA) as a member of the Central Division of the Eastern Conference. The team began play as an expansion team in 1970, along with the Portland Trail Blazers and Buffalo Braves. Home games were first held at Cleveland Arena from 1970 to 1974, followed by the Richfield Coliseum from 1974 to 1994. Since 1994, the Cavs have played home games at Rocket Arena in downtown Cleveland, which is shared with the Cleveland Monsters of the American Hockey League. Dan Gilbert has owned the team since March 2005.

The Cavaliers struggled in their early years, placing no better than sixth in the Eastern Conference during their first five seasons. The team won their first Central Division title in 1976, which also marked the first winning season and playoff appearance in franchise history, where they advanced to the Eastern Conference Finals. The franchise was purchased by Ted Stepien in 1980. Stepien's tenure as owner was marked by six coaching changes, questionable trades and draft decisions, and poor attendance, leading to $15 million in financial losses. The Cavs went 66–180 over the course of those three seasons and endured a 24-game losing streak spanning the 1981–82 and 1982–83 seasons. George and Gordon Gund purchased the franchise in 1983.

During the latter half of the 1980s and through much of the 1990s, the Cavs were a regular playoff contender, led by players such as Mark Price and Brad Daugherty. After the team's playoff appearance in the 1997–98 season, however, the Cavs had six consecutive losing seasons with no playoff action. Cleveland was awarded with the top overall pick in the 2003 draft, and they selected LeBron James. Behind James and Zydrunas Ilgauskas, the Cavaliers again became a regular playoff contender by 2005 and made their first appearance in the NBA Finals in 2007. After failing to return to the NBA Finals in the ensuing three seasons, James joined the Miami Heat in 2010. As a result, the Cavaliers finished the 2010–11 season last in the conference, enduring a 26-game losing streak, the third-longest in NBA history. Between 2010 and 2014, the team won the top pick in the NBA draft lottery three times – first in 2011 where they selected Kyrie Irving, and again in 2013 and 2014.

After four seasons with the Heat and having won back-to-back titles in the 2011–12 and 2012–13 seasons, James returned to the Cavs in 2014 and led the team to four straight NBA Finals appearances. In 2016, the Cavaliers won their first NBA Championship, marking Cleveland's first major sports title since 1964. The 2016 NBA Finals victory over the Golden State Warriors marked the first time in Finals history a team had come back to win the series after trailing 3–1. After back-to-back Finals losses in 2017 and 2018, James departed for the Los Angeles Lakers and the Cavs entered a rebuild, returning to playoff contention in the mid-2020s led by players such as Donovan Mitchell and Evan Mobley.

== History ==
The Cavaliers began play in the 1970–71 season as an expansion team. They set losing records in each of their first five seasons before winning their first division title in 1976. The 1976 team was led by Austin Carr, Bobby "Bingo" Smith, Jim Chones, Dick Snyder, Nate Thurmond and head coach Bill Fitch. It was remembered for the "Miracle at Richfield", in which the Cavaliers defeated the Washington Bullets, 4–3, in the Eastern Conference Semifinals. They won Game 7, 87–85, on a shot by Snyder with four seconds to go. The Cavaliers moved on to the Eastern Conference Finals for the first time, but were without Chones after he broke his toe before the series opener. As a result, the Cavaliers went on to lose, 4–2, to the Boston Celtics. They made playoff appearances in the following two seasons before a six-year playoff drought.

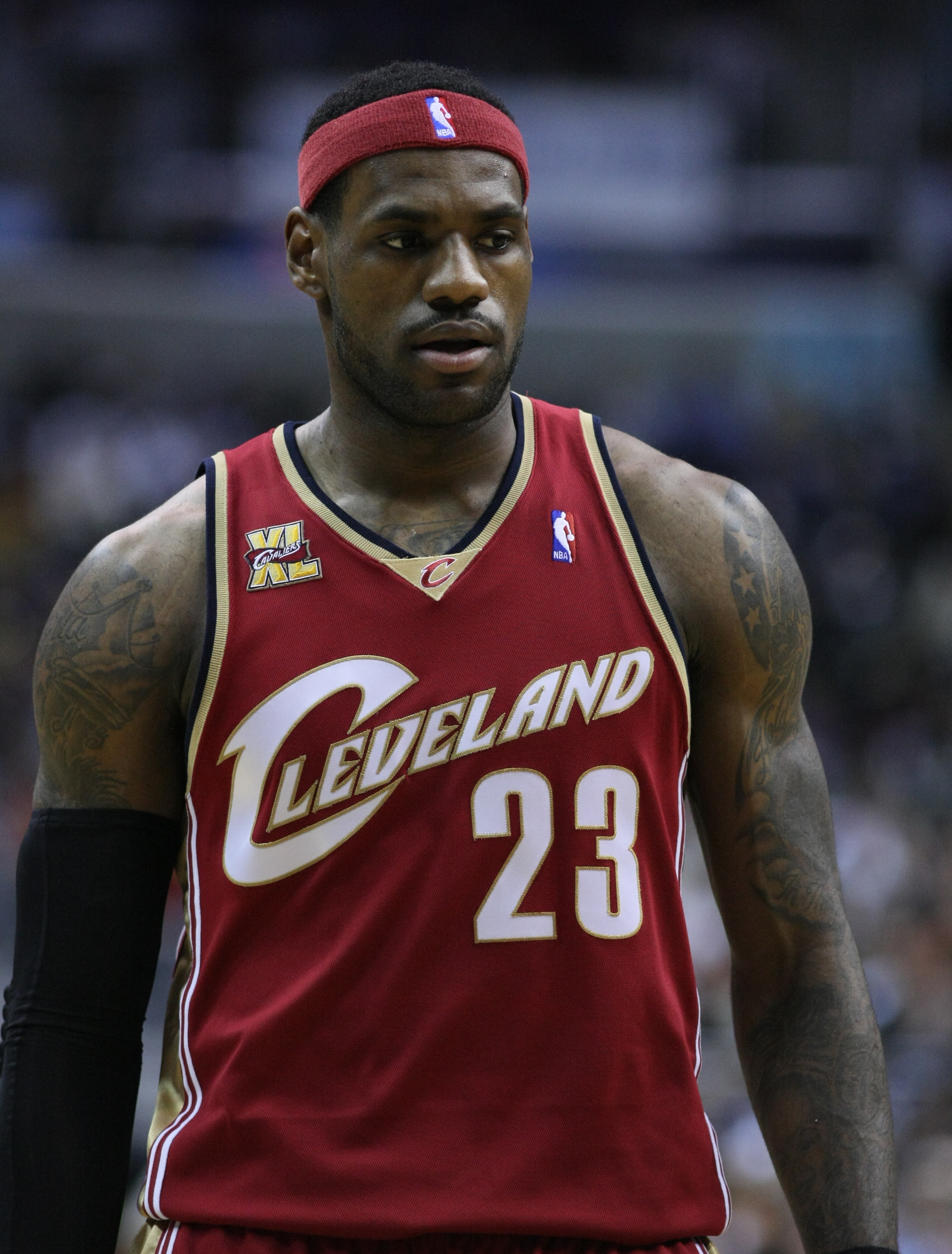
Cavaliers forward and Akron native LeBron James, who was the first overall pick of the 2003 NBA draft. A perennial NBA All-Star and a four-time NBA MVP winner, he led the team to its first NBA Finals in 2007 and their first championship in 2016.

The early 1980s were marked by Ted Stepien's ownership. During Stepien's tenure, the Cavaliers made a practice of trading future draft picks for marginal veteran players. His most notable deal sent a 1982 first-round pick to the Los Angeles Lakers in exchange for Don Ford and the 22nd overall pick in 1980. As a result of Stepien's dealings, the NBA introduced the "Stepien Rule", which prohibits teams from trading first-round draft picks in successive seasons. The Cavaliers went 66–180, dropped to the bottom of the league in attendance and lost $15 million during Stepien's three years as the owner. The Cavs went through six coaches during this span, including four during the 1981–82 season. The team finished 15–67, and between March and November 1982, the team had a 24-game losing streak, which, at the time, was the NBA's longest losing streak. George and Gordon Gund purchased the Cavaliers from Stepien in 1983.

The Cavaliers made the playoffs 10 times between 1985 and 1998. The 1988–89 season was the Cavaliers' best season to date, finishing the regular season at 57–25 with a team that included Brad Daugherty, Mark Price, Ron Harper and Larry Nance, and head coach Lenny Wilkens. They had their second 57-win season in 1991–92 and reached the Eastern Conference Finals that year. However, between 1999 and 2005, the Cavaliers failed to make a playoff appearance. The Cavaliers finished the 2002–03 season 17–65, tied for the worst record in the NBA.

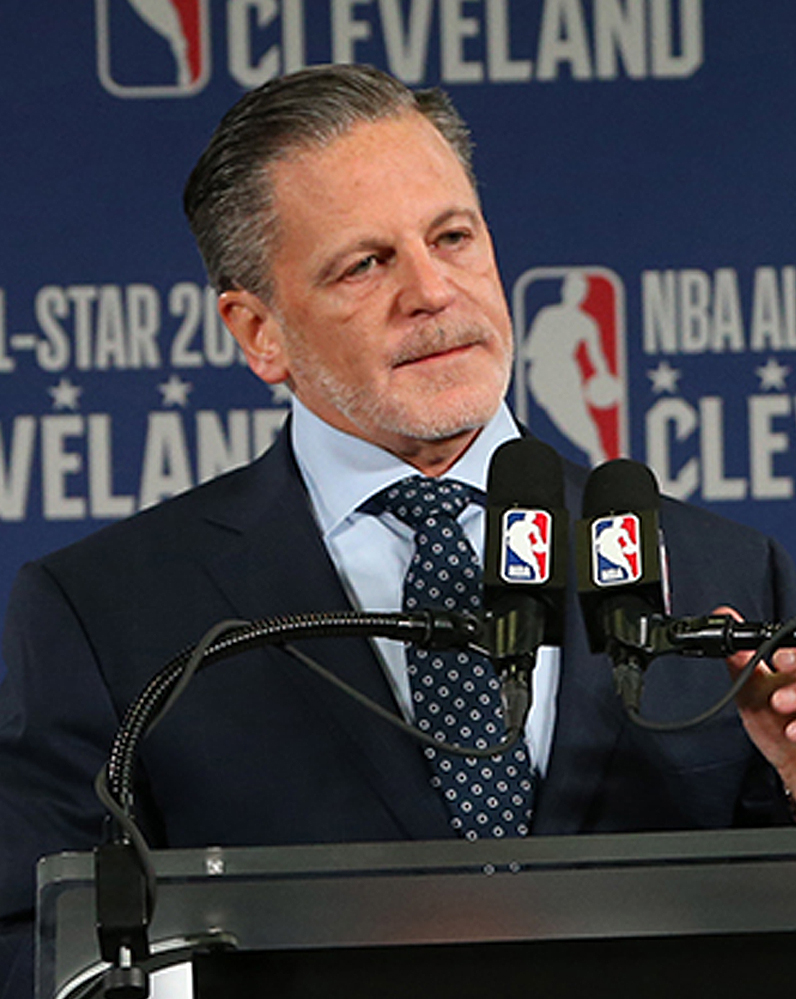
Dan Gilbert, who has owned the Cavaliers since 2005, with the team winning the 2016 NBA Championship under his watch.

The Cavaliers had the No. 1 pick in the 2003 NBA draft, selecting future NBA MVP LeBron James, a native of nearby Akron. On January 3, 2005, the team was sold to businessman Dan Gilbert for $375 million, and the deal was finalized on March 1, 2005. That year, the team also hired head coach Mike Brown and general manager Danny Ferry. The Cavaliers built a team around James and Žydrūnas Ilgauskas by adding players such as Drew Gooden, Larry Hughes and Anderson Varajao. Under this new leadership, the Cavaliers made five straight playoffs from 2006 to 2010, advancing to at least the second round each time. The 2006–07 Cavaliers advanced to the franchise's first NBA Finals, but were swept by the San Antonio Spurs. The 2008–09 Cavaliers won a franchise-record 66 games, including a franchise-best 39–2 record at home, but lost the Eastern Conference Finals to the Orlando Magic. Despite the addition of four-time NBA champion Shaquille O'Neal, the 2009–10 Cavaliers were unable to return to the Eastern Conference Finals after losing to the Boston Celtics in the second round.

With the Cavaliers out of the playoffs, the focus turned to James' impending free agency. On July 8, 2010, James announced in a nationally televised one-hour special titled The Decision that he would be signing with the Miami Heat. The repercussions of this announcement left many in the city of Cleveland infuriated and feeling betrayed. After a 19–win season in 2010–11, the Cavaliers began a rebuild around Kyrie Irving, whom they selected first overall in the 2011 NBA draft. Irving would win Rookie of the Year and was an All-Star selection by his second season, but his presence was not enough to lift the Cavaliers back into playoff contention as they went 97–215 over the next three seasons.

By 2014, James had helped lead the Heat to a 224–88 record over his four-year tenure and won NBA titles in 2012 and 2013. In the 2014 offseason, he returned to the Cavaliers, who subsequently made several moves to build a championship-contending team around James, most notably acquiring power forward Kevin Love from the Minnesota Timberwolves, which created what many fans and media referred to as a "Big Three" with James, Love and Irving. The LeBron-led Cavaliers made four consecutive Finals appearances from 2015 to 2018 – all against the Golden State Warriors – winning in 2016. The 2016 NBA Championship marked the Cavaliers' first title in franchise history, as they became the first team to come back from a 3–1 deficit to win the Finals. It was also Cleveland's first championship in major professional sports since the 1964 Browns, signaling the end of the so-called Cleveland sports curse.

The Cavaliers' roster went through many changes in the 2017–18 season, most notably the trade of Irving to the Boston Celtics in exchange for Isaiah Thomas and other assets. Thomas was later traded to the Los Angeles Lakers as part of a trade deadline overhaul that saw the Cavaliers add Jordan Clarkson, Larry Nance Jr. (son of Cavs legend Larry Nance) and others. The following offseason, James declined his player option to rejoin the team, instead signing with the Lakers. In the following two seasons, the team recorded only 19 wins and failed to make the playoffs.

In the first three seasons since James left the second time, the Cavaliers won a total of 60 games, missed the playoffs each season and had four different head coaches: Tyronn Lue, Larry Drew, John Beilein and by this time, J.B. Bickerstaff, who was promoted to head coach for the 2020–21 season after he had been an assistant on Belien's staff the previous season. In the 2021–22 season, the Cavs finished 44–38 and eighth in the Eastern Conference, and qualified for the NBA play-in tournament, marking the first time the team played in the event. This also marks the team's first postseason basketball since 2017–18 and the first time a non-LeBron-led team qualified for postseason play since 1997–98. The team, however, did not make it out of the play-in tournament, losing the game to the Brooklyn Nets and then to the Atlanta Hawks, ending their season.

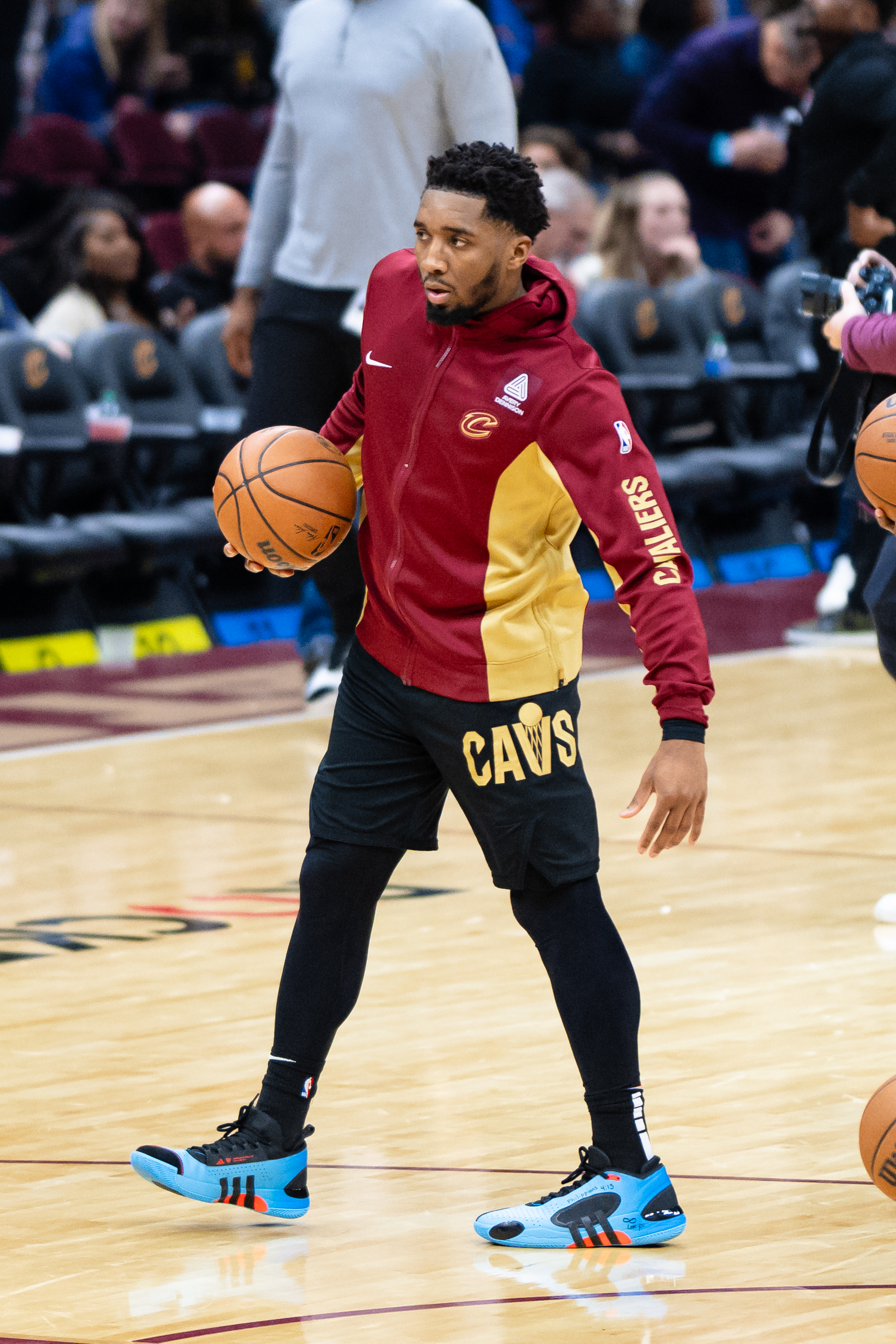
Donovan Mitchell, who was traded to the Cavaliers on September 1, 2022 and has been an All-Star in all four seasons he has played for the Cavs.

Beginning with the aquation of Donovan Mitchell in September 2022, the Cavaliers returned to playoff contention. On March 26, 2023, they clinched a spot in the NBA playoffs, making this the first time since 2018 that the team entered the playoffs, with a 108–91 win over the Houston Rockets. This was also the first time since 1998 that the team entered the playoffs without LeBron James. They wound up losing their first round playoff series to the New York Knicks four games to one.

On October 25, 2023, it was announced that defensive end Myles Garrett of the Cleveland Browns had purchased a minority ownership stake in the Cavaliers. Along with his ownership stake, Garrett would serve as an ambassador for the team. The Cavaliers qualified the 2024 NBA Playoffs as the 4th seed in the Eastern Conference, defeating the Orlando Magic 4–3 in the first round, but losing to the Boston Celtics 4–1 in the Conference semifinals.

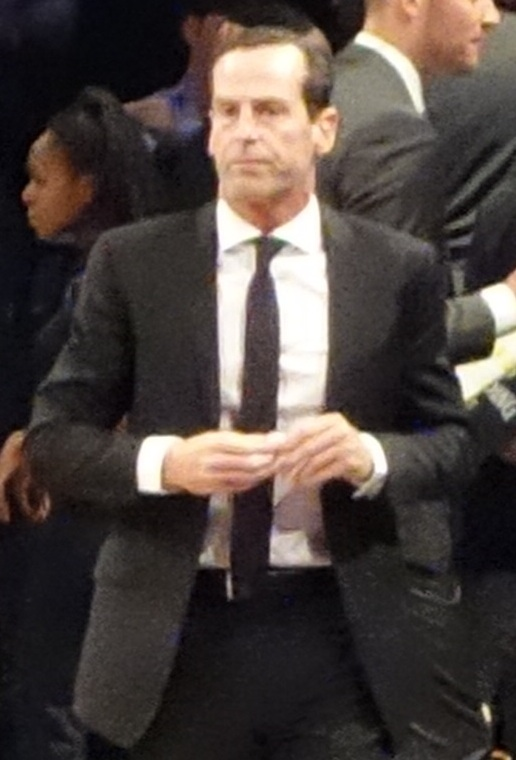
Current head coach Kenny Atkinson

After a 128–114 win against the Charlotte Hornets on November 17, 2024, the Cavaliers achieved a 15–0 start, which is tied for the second-best start in franchise history, and the Cavaliers are the fourth team to achieve this milestone, after the 2015–16 Golden State Warriors team, the 1993–94 Houston Rockets team, and the 1948–49 Washington Capitols team. The 15–0 start is also the Cavaliers’ longest winning streak in franchise history. On November 19, 2024, the Boston Celtics ended the Cavaliers 15–0 start and 15 game winning streak when they won 120–117, giving the Cavaliers their first loss of the season. The Cavaliers finished the season as the East's first seed for the first time since 2016, but were defeated in five games in the Eastern Conference Semifinals by the eventual Eastern Conference champion Indiana Pacers.

During the following season, the Cavaliers acquired former MVP James Harden in a midseason trade the saw Darius Garland get sent to the Los Angeles Clippers. They ended the season as the East's fourth seed and advanced to the Eastern Conference Finals for the first time since 2018, losing in a four-game sweep to the eventual NBA champion New York Knicks.

== Season-by-season record ==
List of the last five seasons completed by the Cavaliers. For the full season-by-season history, see List of Cleveland Cavaliers seasons.

Note: GP = Games played, W = Wins, L = Losses, W–L% = Winning percentage

Season	GP	W	L	W–L%	Finish	Playoffs
2021–22	82	44	38	.537	3rd, Central	Did not qualify
2022–23	82	51	31	.622	2nd, Central	Lost in first round, 4–1 (Knicks)
2023–24	82	48	34	.585	2nd, Central	Lost in conference semifinals, 4–1 (Celtics)
2024–25	82	64	18	.780	1st, Central	Lost in conference semifinals, 4–1 (Pacers)
2025–26	82	52	30	.634	2nd, Central	Lost in conference finals, 4–0 (Knicks)

== Logos and uniforms ==
=== Original wine and mustard/metallic gold ===
When the Cleveland Cavaliers debuted in the NBA in 1970, the team's original jersey colors were wine and gold. The first jerseys featured the feathered treatment of the letter "C" in "Cavaliers". In 1974, they changed into the classic block lettering and checkerboard pattern that was synonymous to the "Miracle of Richfield" team of 1976. In 1980, the gold shade was changed from yellowish to metallic, and the uniforms removed the checkerboard pattern and placed the stripes above "Cleveland" and below the uniform number, the only time the city name was featured in both home and away jerseys.

The original logo was that of a swashbuckling cavalier looking right with a sword pointing, surrounded by the team name and a basketball. A modernized swashbuckling cavalier logo was later used by the Cavaliers' NBA Development League affiliate, the Canton Charge. The gold checkerboard uniforms were used as throwbacks in the 2004–05 season to commemorate the 30th anniversary of the "Miracle of Richfield" team, while the gold "feathered C" uniforms were used again in the 2008–09 season as a buildup to the then-upcoming 40th season of the Cavaliers. The "Miracle of Richfield" gold uniforms were used again in the 2015–16 season on special "Hardwood Classic" nights to commemorate the Miracle of Richfield team's 40th-anniversary celebration.

=== Blue and orange ===
In the 1983–84 season, the colors were changed to burnt orange, blue and white. The first Cavaliers uniform under the new scheme featured the Cavaliers logo (with a "V" in the shape of a hoop and circle above as basketball) in an arched pattern and the player name sewn onto the back shoulder as a patch, with orange being the primary color in both the away and home uniforms. However, in the 1987–88 season, orange was relegated as a secondary color, and blue was used instead as the primary for the away and home uniforms; minor changes in the 1989–90 season include the city name on the blue away uniforms. The drop shadows were also removed. The orange version of the uniform was used again in the 2006–07 and 2016–17 seasons, as part of the respective 20th and 30th anniversaries of the 1986–87 team. The blue versions were worn in the 2009–10 season as part of the franchise's 40th anniversary and as a tribute to the 1988–89 team.

=== Blue, black and orange ===
Coinciding with the move to Gund Arena in the 1994–95 season, the Cavaliers changed logos and uniforms, adding black in addition to the already existing blue, orange and white colors. The uniforms feature a blue splash in the abdomen area in front. From 1994 to 1997, the word "CAVS" on the home uniforms was orange with black lines, while the numbers are in black with white lines; "CLEVELAND" on the road uniforms was also orange with black lines, while the numbers are in white with a black line. From 1997 to 1999, the numbers and lettering were slightly tweaked: The word "CAVS" and the numbers on the home uniforms were black with orange lines, while the word "CLEVELAND" and the numbers on the road uniforms were white with orange lines. In the latter iteration, the blue splash was moved from the right leg to the left leg, surrounding "CLEVELAND" on the home uniforms and "CAVS" on the road uniforms, with a minor change in striping.

In the 1999–2000 season, the Cavaliers opted to go for a cleaner look, eliminating the splash and adding an orange and blue line that runs through the shorts. The home jerseys feature the team nickname and the uniform numbers are in blue with black lines, while the away jerseys featured the city name and the uniform numbers in white with blue lines; these jerseys were used until the 2002–03 season. The logo used in this period was of a basketball on its way down a net, surrounded by a black square and the word "CAVS" in blue with black line below.

The 1994–1996 black uniforms were revived for the 2019–20 season as part of the Cavaliers' 50th season, as well as the 25th anniversary of the move to Gund Arena (now Rocket Arena).

=== Wine, metallic gold and navy ===
The Cavaliers switched to a modified version of the team's classic wine-and-gold scheme in the 2003–04 season: metallic gold and a crimson shade of wine with navy blue added. The home uniform was white, with the word "Cavaliers" in wine lettering with gold trim on the front, the player's name in wine lettering with gold trim on the back, the player's numbers in navy blue, and wine-and-gold trim on the sides. The team's standard road uniform was wine-colored, with the word "Cleveland", the player's name and the player's numbers all in white lettering with gold trim, as well as white and gold trim on the sides. The team's alternate jersey was navy blue with the word "Cleveland", the player's name and the player's numbers all in white lettering with gold trim, as well as a wine, gold and navy blue checkerboard trim. The checkerboard trim was a tribute to the original Cavaliers uniforms from the 1970s. The navy alternates were first worn in the 2005–06 season and for a majority of its existence, the Cavaliers primarily wore them during road playoff games. The logo used was a gold sword piercing through the words "Cleveland Cavaliers" in white and navy trim, with a wine basketball surrounding it.

The navy blue alternate from 2005–2010 was brought back as its "Classic" uniform in the 2025–26 season, paying tribute to the franchise's first NBA Finals appearance in the 2006–07 season.

=== Wine, mustard gold and navy ===
The Cavaliers debuted new uniforms before the start of the 2010–11 NBA season to coincide with the team returning to the original shades of wine and gold used from 1970 to 1983. The home uniform is white with a wine-and-gold horizontal stripe trim on the collar, sleeves, waistband and pant legs, the word "CAVALIERS" (in block style lettering) in wine on the front of the jersey with wine lettering for the name and number, and white shoes and socks. The road uniform is wine-colored with the same stripe trim, "Cleveland" in gold on the front of the jersey, gold lettering on the name and number, and black shoes and socks. An alternate jersey – gold with "CAVS" in wine on the front of the jersey, wine lettering on the name and number, white socks and shoes, and the same stripe trim as the other uniforms – was added for the 2012–13 season. All uniforms have the team motto – "All for one. One for all." – stitched on the inside of the collar and the secondary "Sword C" logo on the side of the pant legs. The logo used is the same piercing sword logo, updated to the classic wine-and-gold scheme.

For the 2014–15 season, a second alternate jersey – and fourth uniform overall – was added, which is navy blue (a callback to the 1987–1994 style) with "CAVS" and the player's number in wine with gold trim, the player's name on the back of the jersey in gold and the "Sword C" logo on the side of the pant legs.

=== Wine, mustard gold, navy and black ===
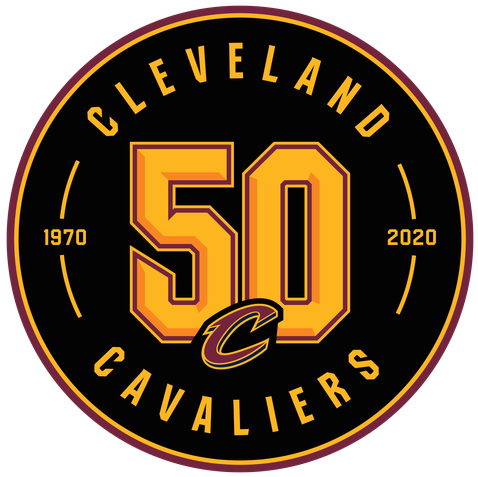
50th anniversary logo used during 2019–20 season

Two alternate jerseys were unveiled prior to the start of the 2015–16 season. The second wine uniform is similar to their regular road jersey, except that it features the arched mid-1980s Cavs logo and white numerals in gold trim. A black sleeved uniform features the wine "C" logo in front and was famously worn in the title-clinching Game 7 of the 2016 NBA Finals. Their logos for the 2017–18 season newly included the color black to commemorate the victory.

Beginning in the 2017–18 season, all NBA teams switched to Nike-designed white "Association" uniforms and "Icon" uniforms in the respective team's primary color. The Cavaliers' Icon uniforms were wine-colored with "Cleveland" across the front and the player's name in gold lettering with navy blue numerals both in the front and in the back. The white Association uniforms have "Cavs" across the front, with wine color letters and numbers both front and back. All teams have the choice of which uniform to wear for any home game. Also included on the Cavs' jerseys is a small Goodyear "Wingfoot" logo, as part of a sponsorship deal with the team.

Nike also provides a third, alternate uniform called the "Statement" uniform. The Cavaliers' Statement uniform is black with dark gray pinstripes, a wine-colored "C" trimmed in gold on the front, names in gold letters on the back, wine-colored/gold-trimmed numbers on the front and back, and gold-colored Nike and Goodyear logos on the front. In the same vein as the logo on their 2017–18 jerseys, the black jersey is a nod to the team's former black-sleeved jerseys that they wore when they won Game 7 of the 2016 Finals.

=== Wine, metallic gold and black ===
Cavaliers' "V-net" logo - a modified version of similar logos used in the 1980s and 1990s that the team began using in 2022.

For the 2022–23 NBA season, the Cavaliers unveiled an updated logo and color scheme, removing navy blue while reverting to the metallic gold first used from 1980 to 1983, and from 2003 to 2010. The "C-sword" alternate logo was retired, and an updated "V-net" logo, merging the styles of the 1983–1994 and 1994–2003 logos with the current typeface, was also unveiled.

With the new logo, the team also introduced three coinciding new uniforms.

The white Association uniform features a wine-colored "V-net" logo trimmed in gold across the front, wine names and numbers trimmed in gold, and a wine primary "Cavs C" logo (outlined in gold) on left leg of the shorts.

The wine Icon uniform features "Cleveland" in gold lettering on the chest, gold names and numbers, and the "Cavs C" logo in wine with a gold outline on the left leg of the shorts.

The black Statement uniform – a nod to the black uniforms worn during the team's 2016 NBA championship run – displays a wine "Cavs C" logo outlined in gold on the front of the jersey, gold names and numbers, and a gold "V-net" logo on the left leg of the shorts.

=== CavFanatic uniforms ===
From the 2008–09 to the 2011–12 season, the Cavaliers wore special "mash-up" uniforms – combining the style from one era with the color scheme of another – on select "CavFanatic Nights".

- 2008–09: The team wore the original "feathered C" uniforms, but with the 1994–2003 shade of blue combined with the classic wine-and-gold coloring.
- 2009–10: The team wore their 1987–1989 uniforms, but in the classic wine and gold from the "Miracle of Richfield" era.
- 2010–11: The team wore the 2005–10 checkerboard alternate uniforms, but in the 1994–2003 color scheme of blue, black and orange.
- 2011–12: The team wore navy uniforms with wine-and-gold lettering; these were similar to the 2014–17 navy alternates, but with a different jersey and shorts striping.

=== "City Edition" uniforms ===
Nike also provides a fourth uniform known as the "City Edition", which honors the city of Cleveland as well as the state of Ohio:

- For the 2017–18 season, the "City Edition" uniform was gray with dark gray trim and had "The Land" (a popular Cleveland nickname) across the front of the jersey in white letters and trimmed in dark gray and gold (as is the number on the front of the jersey), with the player's name and number in white lettering on the back.
- For the 2018–19 season, the "City Edition" uniform was orange and blue (a nod to the popular Cavs teams of the 1980s) in a zigzag/slash pattern (reminiscent of the '90s-era uniforms) with white letters and numbers, and featured a script "Cleveland" across the front of the jersey. On the right pant leg, an outline of the Great Lakes (with Lake Erie highlighted) is featured with the slogan "1 OUT OF 5 GREATS." For the home games in which these uniforms were worn, the floor at Quicken Loans Arena was modified with an orange and blue design, as well. The same uniform design of the "City Edition" uniform was used for the team's "Earned Edition" uniform (exclusive to the 2018 NBA playoff teams), except the top part was white, while the bottom was powder blue and featured navy letters and numbers. The white "Earned" uniform was reused as the Cavaliers' "City" uniform in the 2026–27 season.
- For the 2019–20 season, the "City Edition" uniform was navy blue (a nod to the team's mid- to late-2000s alternate uniform) with "CLE" in gold letters (in the style of the team's original 1970 uniforms) and the numbers in gold with a wine inlay (in the style of the '90s uniforms), and wine, gold, white and black stripes down the sides. Additionally, to commemorate the team's 50th anniversary season, Nike provided a fifth uniform known as the "Classic Edition", which was a modified version of the team's mid-'90s-era black, blue and orange uniforms.
- For the 2020–21 season, the "City Edition" uniform was black with wine-and-gold trim around the neck and sleeves and white letters and numbers. "CLEVELAND" was featured on the front of the jersey, with each letter in a different font to represent both the Cavs and various artists and bands that have been inducted in the Rock and Roll Hall of Fame, as well as various patches down the sides of the pant legs. The jersey design is in honor of a partnership between the Cavs and the Rock and Roll Hall of Fame, who are collaborating on a "Cleveland Amplified" exhibit at the Rock Hall. The letters represent: "C" (Cleveland Cavaliers), "L" (Sex Pistols), "E" (The Who), "V" (David Bowie), "E" (Metallica), "L" (The Beatles), "A" (Nirvana), "N" (N.W.A) and "D" (Pink Floyd).
- For the 2021–22 season, the "City Edition" uniform was in the team's traditional wine color with gold letters and numbers; wine, gold and white trim around the sleeves and going down the pant legs; and a mix of the team's logos through its history all throughout the uniform. On the front of the jersey is the team's original 1970s "swashbuckler" logo, with the numbers in the style of the team's 1990s uniforms. On the pants, the team's 1980s logo is on the waistband, the '90s logo is on the left leg and the modern-era "C" logo is on the right leg.
- For the 2022–23 season, the "City Edition" uniform was white with tan lettering and numbers and accents of light blue, in honor of the Cleveland Metroparks. The jerseys read "The Land" across the chest, with a light blue circle featuring the Cavs' "C" logo placed between the "L" and "A," similar to how the "V" in the script Cavs logo is used as a basketball hoop.
- For the 2023–24 season, the "City Edition" uniform was wine with gold letters and numbers and ornate gold trim around the sleeves in honor of Cleveland's Playhouse Square theater district. The jerseys read "The Land" across the chest in a font similar to that on a theater marquee.
- For the 2024–25 season, the "City Edition" uniforms are light blue with "The Land" in white letters on the front and white names and numbers on the back. Sketch drawings of the Cavs logo and Cleveland landmarks are featured going down the sides of the uniforms in honor of the Cleveland Museum of Art.
- For the 2025–26 season, the Cavaliers brought back their 2022–23 "City" uniform, but recolored to an orange base, dark russet and Amarillo yellow trim to represent Cleveland's sunsets and autumn foliage.

== Home arenas ==
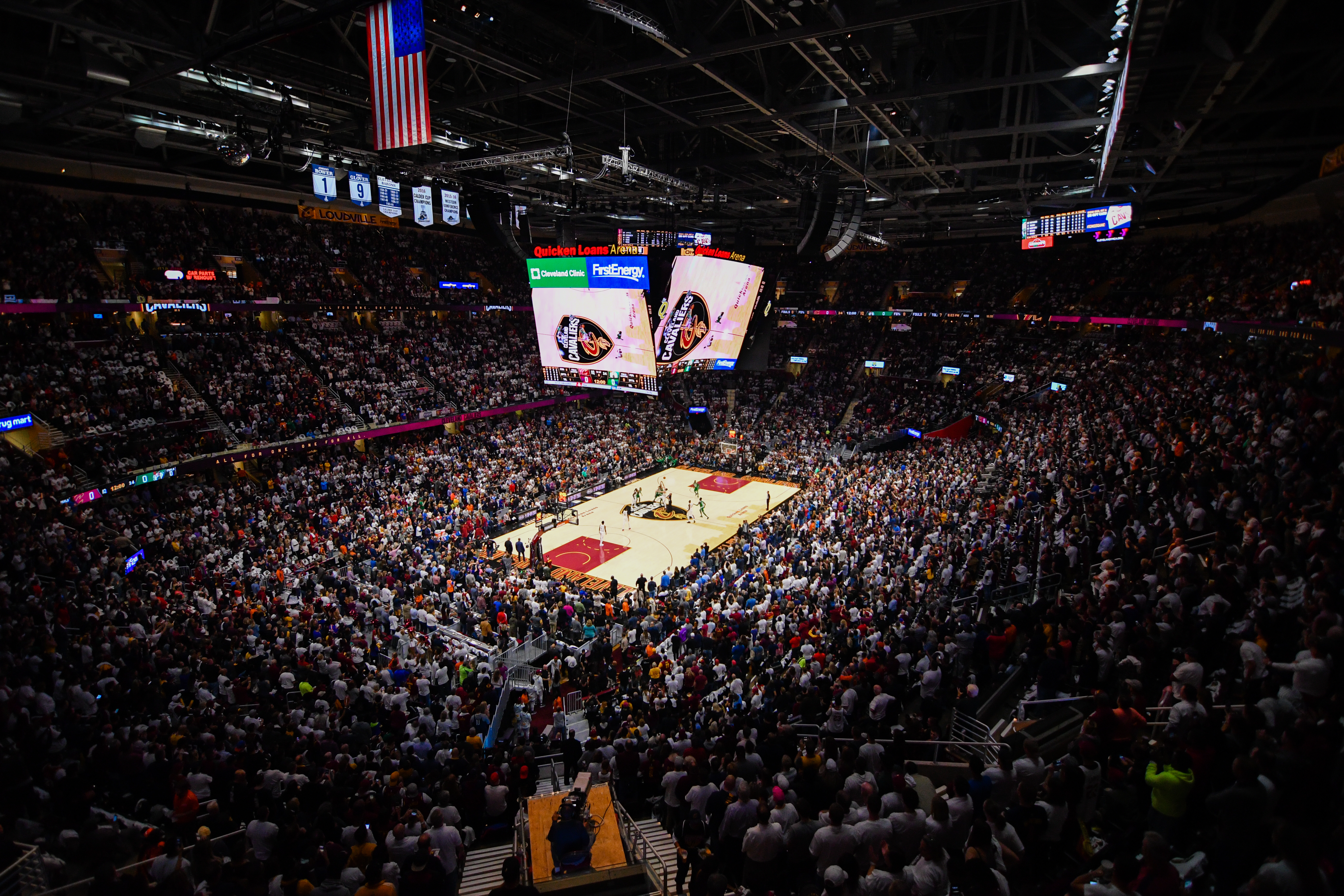
Scene of the 2017–18 season opener in then Quicken Loans Arena

- Cleveland Arena (1970–1974)
- Coliseum at Richfield (1974–1994)
- Rocket Arena (1994–present)

== Cleveland Clinic Courts ==
Cleveland Clinic Courts, the team's practice facility and team headquarters, is located in suburban Independence. The 50,000-square-foot (4,600 m^{2}) building opened in 2007 and includes two full-size basketball courts, a weight room, a team room, offices, medical facilities, and kitchen and dining facilities. Naming rights are held by the Cleveland Clinic, which is the team's official healthcare partner. Prior to the opening of Cleveland Clinic Courts, the team used the practice court located on the club level of Rocket Arena. In honor of the Cavs winning the NBA Championship, the city of Independence renamed the section of Brecksville Road leading to the team's practice facility "Cavaliers Way" in November 2016.

== Personnel ==
=== Current roster ===
Cleveland Cavaliers roster
Players

Pos.	No.	Player	Height	Weight	DOB	From
C	31	Jarrett Allen	6 ft 9 in (2.06 m)	250 lb (113 kg)	1998-04-21	Texas
F/C	3	Thomas Bryant	6 ft 9 in (2.06 m)	260 lb (118 kg)	1997-07-31	Indiana
C	18	Khalifa Diop	6 ft 10 in (2.08 m)	231 lb (105 kg)	2002-01-15	Senegal
G	1	James Harden	6 ft 4 in (1.93 m)	220 lb (100 kg)	1989-08-26	Arizona State
G/F	33	Mario Hezonja	6 ft 8 in (2.03 m)	255 lb (116 kg)	1995-02-25	Croatia
G	5	Sam Merrill	6 ft 4 in (1.93 m)	195 lb (88 kg)	1996-05-15	Utah State
F	12	Riley Minix (TW)	6 ft 7 in (2.01 m)	230 lb (104 kg)	2000-09-22	Morehead State
G	45	Donovan Mitchell	6 ft 2 in (1.88 m)	228 lb (103 kg)	1996-09-07	Louisville
C	4	Evan Mobley	6 ft 11 in (2.11 m)	230 lb (104 kg)	2001-06-18	USC
F	77	Norchad Omier (TW)	6 ft 5 in (1.96 m)	248 lb (112 kg)	2001-08-28	Baylor
G	9	Craig Porter Jr.	6 ft 1 in (1.85 m)	194 lb (88 kg)	2000-02-26	Wichita State
G	24	Tyrese Proctor	6 ft 4 in (1.93 m)	185 lb (84 kg)	2004-04-01	Duke
G	15	Meleek Thomas	6 ft 3 in (1.91 m)	190 lb (86 kg)	2006-08-06	Arkansas
F	35	Nae'Qwan Tomlin	6 ft 8 in (2.03 m)	210 lb (95 kg)	2000-12-10	Memphis
G/F	20	Jaylon Tyson	6 ft 6 in (1.98 m)	224 lb (102 kg)	2002-12-02	California
C	88	Ernest Udeh Jr. (TW)	6 ft 9 in (2.06 m)	266 lb (121 kg)	2004-01-08	Miami (FL)
G	8	Peyton Watson	6 ft 7 in (2.01 m)	215 lb (98 kg)	2002-09-11	UCLA

Coaches
Head coach
- Kenny Atkinson
Assistant(s)
- Johnnie Bryant (associate HC)
- Omar Cook
- Mike Gerrity
- Trevor Hendry
- Andrew Olson
- Nate Reinking
- Jawad Williams

Legend
- (DP) Unsigned draft pick
- (FA) Free agent
- (S) Suspended
- (GL) On assignment to G League affiliate
- (TW) Two-way affiliate player
- Injured

Roster
Updated: November 7, 2026

=== Retained draft rights ===
The Cavaliers hold the draft rights to the following unsigned draft picks who have been playing outside the NBA. A drafted player – either an international draftee or a college draftee who is not signed by the team that drafted him – is allowed to sign with any non-NBA teams. In this case, the team retains the player's draft rights in the NBA until one year after the player's contract with the non-NBA team ends. This list includes draft rights that were acquired from trades with other teams.

Draft	Round	Pick	Player	Pos.	Nationality	Current team	Note(s)	Ref
2025	2	58	Saliou Niang	G	Senegal	Aquila Basket Trento (Italy)		
2022	2	39	Khalifa Diop	C	Senegal	Saski Baskonia (Spain)		
2022	2	46	Ismaël Kamagate	C	France	Pallacanestro Varese (Spain)	Acquired from the Detroit Pistons (via Portland, Denver and Los Angeles)	
2015	2	47	Artūras Gudaitis	F/C	Lithuania	BC Rytas (Lithuania)	Acquired from the Philadelphia 76ers (via Sacramento)	
2011	2	56	Chukwudiebere Maduabum	F/C	Nigeria	Veertien Mie (Japan)	Acquired from the Los Angeles Lakers (via Denver and Philadelphia)	

=== Cavs Legends ===
The following is a list of past Cavaliers players and other personnel who have been honored as "Cavs Legends" – either by retiring their number or having commemorative banners placed in the rafters at Rocket Arena.

Retired numbers
No.	Name	Position	Tenure	Date
7	Bobby "Bingo" Smith	G/F	1970–1979	December 4, 1979
11	Zydrunas Ilgauskas	C	1996–2010	March 8, 2014
22 (Note: Nance's son Larry Jr. was given a special exemption to wear #22 even though it had been retired)	Larry Nance	F/C	1988–1994	January 30, 1995
25	Mark Price	G	1986–1995	November 13, 1999
34	Austin Carr	G	1971–1980	January 3, 1981
42	Nate Thurmond	C	1975–1977	December 18, 1977
43	Brad Daugherty	C	1986–1996	March 1, 1997

Other honored personnel
Insignia	Name	Role	Tenure	Date
	Joe Tait	Broadcaster	1970–1981; 1983–2011	April 8, 2011
	Nick Gilbert	Late son of Cavs owner Dan Gilbert		March 3, 2024

- The NBA retired Bill Russell's No. 6 for all its member teams on August 11, 2022.
- The Cavaliers have announced that Kevin Love's No. 0 jersey will be retired by the organization.

=== Wall of Honor ===
In 2019, the Cavaliers introduced the Wall of Honor, which honors former players and other personnel, and is located in the newly added North Atrium of the renovated Rocket Arena.

Cleveland Cavaliers Wall of Honor
Players
No.	Name	Position	Tenure	Inducted
32	John Johnson	SF	1970–1973	2019
18	John Williams	PF / C	1986–1995	2019
21	World B. Free	SG	1982–1986	2022
4; 20; 21	Campy Russell	SF	1974–1980; 1984	2022
1; 11	Terrell Brandon	PG	1991–1997	2024
30	Mike Mitchell	SF	1978–1981	2024
22	Jim Chones	C	1974–1979	2024
Staff
Name		Position	Tenure	Inducted
Nick Mileti		Founder; Owner	1970–1980	2019
Bill Fitch		Head coach	1970–1979	2019
Wayne Embry		General manager	1986–1999	2019
Gordon Gund		Owner	1984–2005	2022
19	Lenny Wilkens	Head coach	1986–1993	2022
Chuck Broski		Stats crew chief	1970–present	2024

Note - All personnel who have had their numbers retired or have a similar banner in the rafters are also inducted into the Wall of Honor

=== Basketball Hall of Famers ===
The following is a list of players and other personnel who have spent at least part of their careers with the Cavaliers that have been inducted into the Naismith Memorial Basketball Hall of Fame.

Cleveland Cavaliers Hall of Famers
Players
No.	Name	Position	Tenure	Inducted
42	Nate Thurmond	F/C	1975–1977	1985
11	Walt Frazier	G	1977–1979	1987
19	Lenny Wilkens ^{1}	G	1972–1974	1989
33	Shaquille O'Neal	C	2009–2010	2016
4	Ben Wallace	F/C	2008–2009	2021
9	Dwyane Wade ^{4}	G	2017–2018	2023
Coaches
Name		Position	Tenure	Inducted
Chuck Daly ^{2}		Head coach	1981–1982	1994
Lenny Wilkens ^{1}		Head coach	1986–1993	1998
Bill Fitch		Head coach	1970–1979	2019
George Karl		Head coach	1984–1986	2022
Contributors
Name		Position	Tenure	Inducted
Wayne Embry ^{3}		General manager	1986–1999	1999

Notes:

- ^{1} In total, Wilkens was inducted into the Hall of Fame three times – as player, as coach and as a member of the 1992 Olympic team.
- ^{2} In total, Daly was inducted into the Hall of Fame twice – as a coach and as a member of the 1992 Olympic team.
- ^{3} Inducted as contributor for being the first African American to manage a team in the NBA.
- ^{4} In total, Wade was inducted into the Hall of Fame twice – as a player and as a member of the 2008 Olympic team.

=== Curt Gowdy Award winners ===
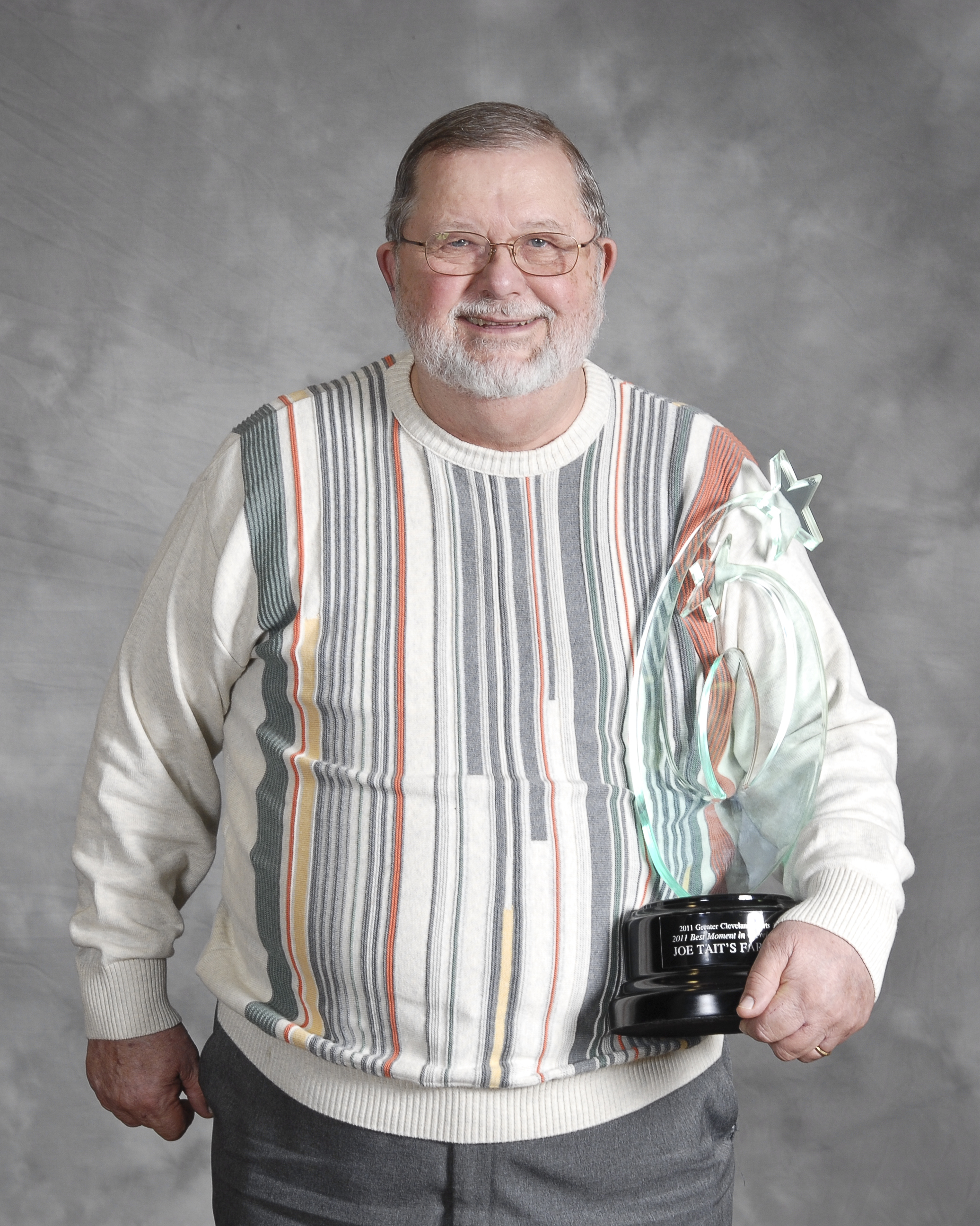
Former longtime Cavs broadcaster Joe Tait, who won the Curt Gowdy Award in 2010.

- Joe Tait – 2010 (team announcer 1970–1981; 1983–2011)

=== FIBA Hall of Famers ===
Cleveland Cavaliers Hall of Famers
Players
No.	Name	Position	Tenure	Inducted
33	Shaquille O'Neal	C	2009–2010	2017
6	Andrew Bogut	C	2017	2025
Coaches
Name		Position	Tenure	Inducted
Chuck Daly ^{1}		Head coach	1981–1982	2021

Notes:

- ^{1} In total, Daly was inducted into the FIBA Hall of Fame twice – as coach and as a member of the 1992 Olympic team.

== Individual records and accomplishments ==
=== Franchise leaders ===
Bold denotes still active with team. Italic denotes still active but not with team.

Points scored (regular season – as of the 2025–26 NBA season)

1. LeBron James (23,119)
2. Zydrunas Ilgauskas (10,616)
3. Brad Daugherty (10,389)
4. Austin Carr (10,265)
5. Mark Price (9,543)
6. Bingo Smith (9,513)
7. Hot Rod Williams (8,504)
8. Kyrie Irving (8,232)
9. Darius Garland (7,671)
10. Kevin Love (7,663)
11. Larry Nance (7,257)
12. **Donovan Mitchell** (7,038)
13. Campy Russell (6,588)
14. World B. Free (6,329)
15. Tristan Thompson (6,069)
16. Terrell Brandon (5,793)
17. **Jarrett Allen** (5,779)
18. Jim Chones (5,729)
19. Danny Ferry (5,643)
20. **Evan Mobley** (5,592)

Other statistics (regular season) (as of the 2024–25 NBA season)

Most minutes played
Player	Minutes
LeBron James	33,130
Zydrunas Ilgauskas	21,820
Hot Rod Williams	20,802
Brad Daugherty	20,029
Bingo Smith	19,221
Austin Carr	19,003
Tristan Thompson	18,249
Mark Price	18,127
Danny Ferry	15,045
Larry Nance	14,966

Most rebounds
Player	Rebounds
LeBron James	6,190
Zydrunas Ilgauskas	5,904
Tristan Thompson	5,701
Brad Daugherty	5,227
Hot Rod Williams	4,669
Kevin Love	4,493
Anderson Varejão	4,454
**Jarrett Allen**	3,859
Jim Chones	3,790
Larry Nance	3,561

Most assists
Player	Assists
LeBron James	6,228
Mark Price	4,206
Darius Garland	2,738
John Bagley	2,311
Terrell Brandon	2,235
Foots Walker	2,115
Kyrie Irving	2,114
Brad Daugherty	2,028
Andre Miller	2,015
Austin Carr	1,820

Most steals
Player	Steals
LeBron James	1,376
Mark Price	734
Foots Walker	722
Craig Ehlo	661
Terrell Brandon	621
Hot Rod Williams	587
Ron Harper	530
Anderson Varejão	529
Kyrie Irving	504
John Bagley	474

Most blocks
Player	Blocks
Zydrunas Ilgauskas	1,269
Hot Rod Williams	1,200
Larry Nance	1,087
LeBron James	695
**Evan Mobley**	532
Tristan Thompson	472
Jim Chones	450
**Jarrett Allen**	431
Roy Hinson	430
Anderson Varejão	399

Most three-pointers made
Player	3-pointers made
LeBron James	1,251
Kevin Love	1,096
Darius Garland	956
**Donovan Mitchell**	884
Mark Price	802
Kyrie Irving	723
Cedi Osman	628
J. R. Smith	585
Daniel Gibson	578
Wesley Person	550

=== Individual awards ===
**NBA Most Valuable Player**

- LeBron James – 2009, 2010

**NBA Rookie of the Year**

- LeBron James – 2004
- Kyrie Irving – 2012

**NBA Defensive Player of the Year**

- Evan Mobley – 2025

**NBA Coach of the Year**

- Bill Fitch – 1976
- Mike Brown – 2009
- Kenny Atkinson – 2025

**NBA Executive of the Year**

- Wayne Embry – 1992, 1998

**NBA Sportsmanship Award**

- Terrell Brandon – 1997

**J. Walter Kennedy Citizenship Award**

- Austin Carr – 1980
- Eric Snow – 2005
- Luol Deng – 2014
- LeBron James – 2017

**NBA Finals Most Valuable Player**

- LeBron James – 2016

**NBA All-Rookie First Team**

- Austin Carr – 1972
- Dwight Davis – 1973
- Brad Daugherty – 1987
- Ron Harper – 1987
- John Williams – 1987
- Zydrunas Ilgauskas – 1998
- Brevin Knight – 1998
- Andre Miller – 2000
- LeBron James – 2004
- Kyrie Irving – 2012
- Dion Waiters – 2013
- Evan Mobley – 2022

**NBA All-Rookie Second Team**

- Terrell Brandon – 1992
- Derek Anderson – 1998
- Cedric Henderson – 1998
- Chris Mihm – 2001
- Carlos Boozer – 2003
- Tristan Thompson – 2012
- Tyler Zeller – 2013
- Collin Sexton – 2019
- Isaac Okoro – 2021

**All-NBA First Team**

- Mark Price – 1993
- LeBron James – 2006, 2008, 2009, 2010, 2015, 2016, 2017, 2018
- Donovan Mitchell – 2025

**All-NBA Second Team**

- LeBron James – 2005, 2007
- Donovan Mitchell – 2023, 2026
- Evan Mobley – 2025

**All-NBA Third Team**

- Mark Price – 1989, 1992, 1994
- Brad Daugherty – 1992
- Kyrie Irving – 2015

**NBA All-Defensive First Team**

- Larry Nance – 1989
- LeBron James – 2009, 2010
- Evan Mobley – 2023, 2025

**NBA All-Defensive Second Team**

- Jim Brewer – 1976, 1977
- Jim Cleamons – 1976
- Larry Nance – 1992, 1993
- Bobby Phills – 1996
- Anderson Varejão – 2010

=== NBA All-Star Weekend ===
**NBA All-Star Game**

- John Johnson – 1971, 1972
- Butch Beard – 1972
- Austin Carr – 1974
- Campy Russell – 1979
- Mike Mitchell – 1981
- Brad Daugherty – 1988, 1989, 1991, 1992, 1993
- Larry Nance – 1989, 1993
- Mark Price – 1989, 1992, 1993, 1994
- Tyrone Hill – 1995
- Terrell Brandon – 1996, 1997
- Shawn Kemp – 1998*
- Žydrūnas Ilgauskas – 2003, 2005
- LeBron James – 2005*, 2006*, 2007*, 2008*, 2009*, 2010*, 2015*, 2016*, 2017*, 2018*
- Mo Williams – 2009
- Kyrie Irving – 2013, 2014*, 2015, 2017*
- Kevin Love – 2017, 2018
- Jarrett Allen – 2022
- Darius Garland – 2022, 2025
- Donovan Mitchell – 2023*, 2024, 2025*, 2026
- Evan Mobley – 2025

* Starter

**NBA All-Star Game head coaches**

- Lenny Wilkens – 1989
- Mike Brown – 2009
- Tyronn Lue – 2016
- Kenny Atkinson – 2025

**NBA All-Star Game MVP**

- LeBron James – 2006, 2008, 2018
- Kyrie Irving – 2014

**Three-point Shootout**

- Mark Price – 1988 (5th), 1990 (7th), **1993 (1st)**, **1994 (1st)**, 1995 (3rd)
- Craig Ehlo – 1990 (5th), 1992 (6th)
- Wesley Person – 2002 (2nd)
- Damon Jones – 2007 (5th)
- Daniel Gibson – 2008 (2nd), 2011 (5th)
- Kyrie Irving – **2013 (1st)**, 2014 (4th), 2015 (2nd), 2017 (2nd)
- Donovan Mitchell – 2024 (7th), 2026 (4th)
- Darius Garland – 2025 (3rd)

**Slam Dunk Contest**

- Roy Hinson – 1986 (7th)
- Ron Harper – 1987 (5th), 1989 (7th)
- Bob Sura – 1997 (5th)
- Larry Nance Jr. – 2018 (2nd)

**Skills Challenge**

- LeBron James – 2006 (2nd), 2007 (3rd)
- Mo Williams – 2009 (3rd)
- Kyrie Irving – 2012 (7th)
- Jarrett Allen – 2022 (1st)
- Darius Garland – 2022 (1st)
- Evan Mobley – 2022 (1st), 2025 (1st)
- Donovan Mitchell – 2025 (1st)

**Rookie/Rising Stars Challenge**

- Chris Mills – 1994
- Bob Sura – 1996
- Vitaly Potapenko – 1997
- Žydrūnas Ilgauskas – 1998
- Brevin Knight – 1998
- Cedric Henderson – 1998
- Derek Anderson – 1998 (DNP)
- Andre Miller – 2000 (rookie), 2001 (sophomore)
- Chris Mihm – 2002 (sophomore)
- Carlos Boozer – 2003 (rookie), 2004 (sophomore)
- Dajuan Wagner – 2003 (rookie)
- LeBron James – 2004 (rookie), 2005 (sophomore)
- Daniel Gibson – 2008 (sophomore)
- Kyrie Irving – 2012 (rookie), 2013 (sophomore)
- Tristan Thompson – 2012 (rookie), 2013 (sophomore)
- Dion Waiters – 2013 (rookie), 2014 (sophomore)
- Tyler Zeller – 2013 (rookie)
- Matthew Dellavedova – 2015 (World)
- Cedi Osman – 2018 (World)
- Collin Sexton – 2020 (sophomore)
- Evan Mobley – 2022 (rookie)
- Isaac Okoro – 2022 (sophomore)
- Emoni Bates – 2024 (rookie)
- Jaylon Tyson – 2026 (sophomore)

**Rookie/Rising Stars Challenge MVP**

- Žydrūnas Ilgauskas – 1998
- Daniel Gibson – 2008 (sophomore)
- Kyrie Irving – 2012 (rookie)

**Two Ball Contest**

- Wesley Person with Michelle Edwards – 1998 (7th)
- Trajan Langdon with Eva Nemcova – 2001 (2nd)

== Media ==
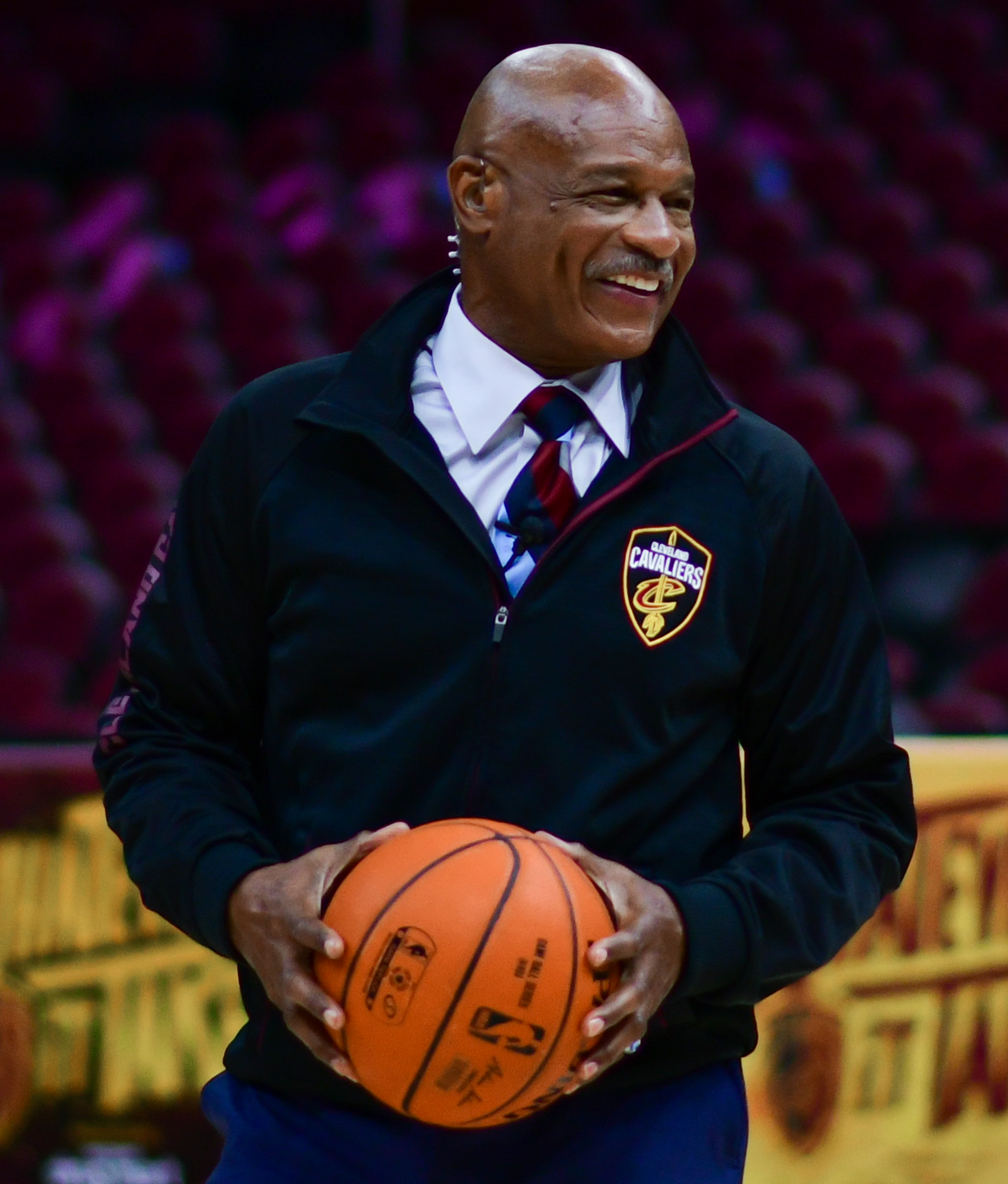
Former Cavs All-Star guard and longtime TV analyst Austin Carr

Radio

WTAM (1100 AM/106.9 FM) and WMMS (100.7 FM) currently serve as the flagship stations for the Cavaliers AudioVerse. Tim Alcorn serves as the announcer, with WTAM morning co-host/sports director Mike Snyder hosting the pregame/halftime/postgame shows. Former Ohio State standout and NBA player Brad Sellers joins Snyder for the postgame show.

Spanish language broadcasts of home games air on WJMO 1300, with Rafael Hernandez Brito on the call.

TV

Starting in the 2026–27 season, Cavaliers games will air on the DAZN streaming service, with 15 games simulcast over-the-air on Gray Media Cleveland sister stations WOIO channel 19 (CBS), WUAB channel 43 (My Network TV), and WTCL-LD/WOHZ-CD/W28FG-D channel 22 (RESN). The broadcast team includes play-by-play announcer John Michael, sideline reporter Serena Winters, and former Cavalier Brad Daugherty as analyst. Any nationally televised games will not be streamed by DAZN due to network exclusivity rights.

Cayleigh Griffin and former Cavaliers guard Austin Carr host the pregame/halftime/postgame shows, with former Cavaliers guard Iman Shumpert serving as a contributor.

== Mascots ==
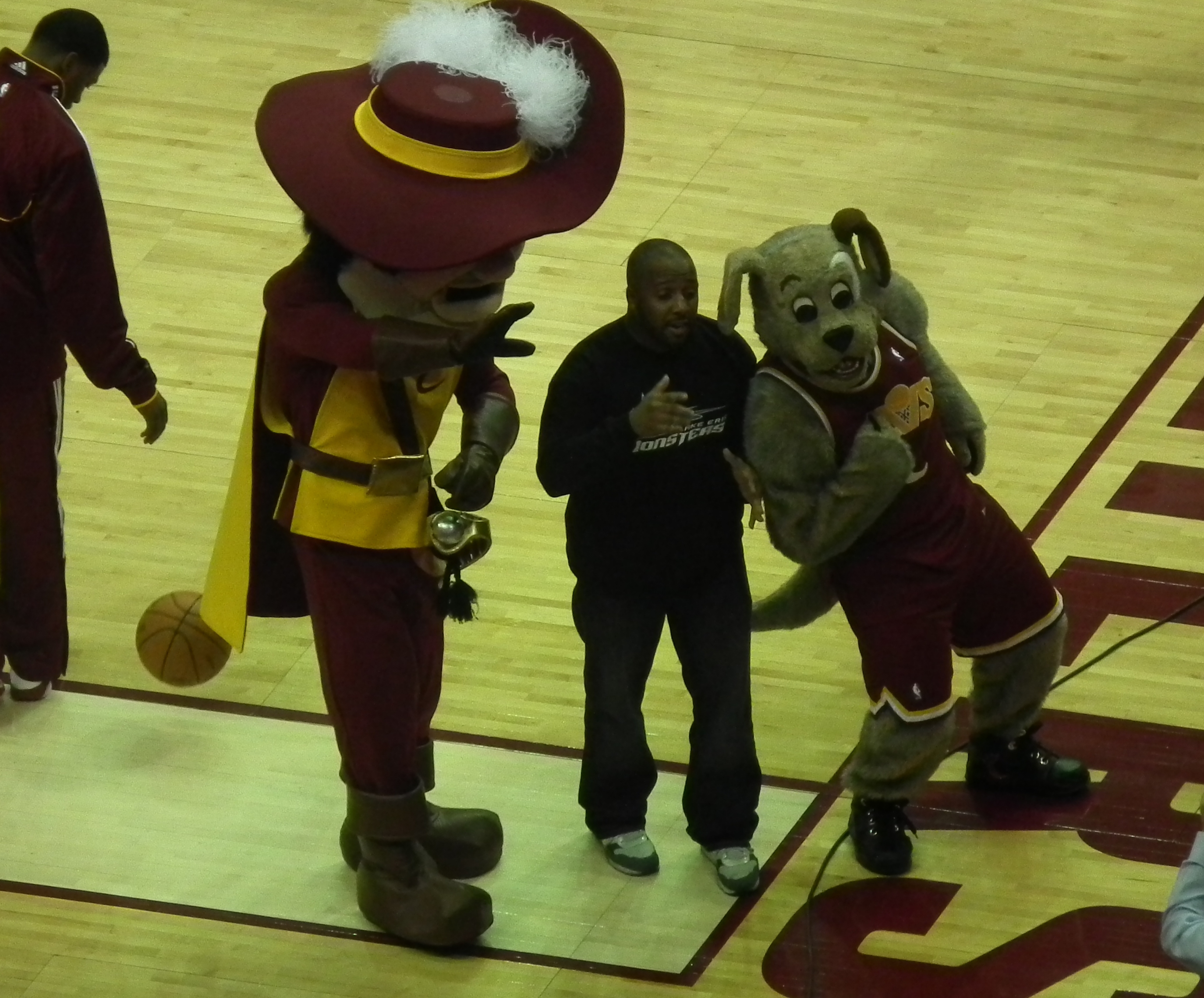
Current mascots Sir C.C. (left) and Moondog (right)

Mid 1990s/early 2000s-era mascot Whammer

=== Current ===
The Cavaliers have two official mascots: Moondog and Sir C.C. The former was inspired by Cleveland radio DJ Alan Freed, who popularized the phrase "rock and roll" and had called himself "Moondog". Moondog was an NBA All-Star selection in 2003 and 2004, and he made his first appearance on November 5, 2003. Sir C.C., a swashbuckler character, debuted during a game on November 27, 2010.

=== Past ===
During the 1990s and early 2000s, the Cavs had a polar bear mascot named Whammer, who was introduced on November 9, 1995. He still makes occasional appearances throughout the season at Cavaliers games.

== Notes ==
Preceded by Golden State Warriors	NBA champions 2015–16	Succeeded by Golden State Warriors
