= Gordon Gund =

American businessman (born 1939)

- Born: October 15, 1939 (age 86); Cleveland, Ohio
- Education: M.A. Harvard University
- Occupations: businessman, sports entrepreneur, sports franchise owner, investment corporation
- Known for: CEO of Gund Investment Corporation, former owner of Cleveland Cavaliers, Cleveland Rockers, and former co-owner of San Jose Sharks
- Spouse: Llura Liggett (m. 1966; died 2020)
- Children: 2
- Parent(s): George Gund II; Jessica Laidlaw Roesler
- Relatives: George Gund III (brother); Agnes Gund (sister); Graham Gund (brother)
- Awards: 2016 NBA Champion, Cleveland Cavs Wall of Honor (class of 2022)

Gordon Gund (born October 15, 1939) is an American businessman and professional sports owner. He is the CEO of Gund Investment Corporation. He is the former co-owner of the San Jose Sharks (National Hockey League) from 1992 to 2002, former principal owner of the Cleveland Cavaliers (National Basketball Association) from 1983 to 2005, and former principal owner of the Cleveland Rockers (Women's National Basketball Association) from 1997 to 2003. Gund lost his sight to retinitis pigmentosa and was a co-founder of Foundation Fighting Blindness.

== Sports ownership ==
=== California Golden Seals and Cleveland Barons ===
Gund's brother, George, held a minority interest in the California Golden Seals of the NHL. The Seals had never been able to find success either on the ice or at the box office, and after plans for a proposed new arena in San Francisco were cancelled in 1976, he convinced majority owner Mel Swig to relocate the franchise from Oakland to the Gunds' hometown in June of that year. Renamed the Barons after the popular former American Hockey League team, they played at The Coliseum in Richfield, which had been vacated by the Cleveland Crusaders of the World Hockey Association when they moved to Saint Paul, Minnesota to become the second incarnation of the Minnesota Fighting Saints.

The Barons only drew 10,000 or more fans in seven out of their 40 home games. They were also troubled by an unfavorable lease with the Coliseum. In January 1977, Swig hinted the team might not finish the season because of payroll difficulties. The Barons actually missed payroll twice in a row in February, and only a $1.3 million loan allowed the Barons to finish the season. They finished last in the Adams Division, and Swig sold his interest in the team to the Gund's.

The Gunds' poured money into the team, and it seemed to make a difference at first. The Barons stunned the defending Stanley Cup champion Montreal Canadiens on November 23 before a boisterous crowd of 12,859. After a brief slump, general manager Harry Howell pulled off several trades in an attempt to make the team tougher. It initially paid off, and the Barons knocked off three of the NHL's top teams, the Toronto Maple Leafs, New York Islanders and Buffalo Sabres in consecutive games in January 1978. A few weeks later, a record crowd of 13,110 saw the Barons tie the Philadelphia Flyers 2–2. The bottom fell out in February, however, as a 15-game losing skid knocked the Barons out of playoff contention.

=== Minnesota North Stars ===
At the end of the 1977–78 season, plans to buy the Coliseum outright fell through, and the Barons' small crowds and continuing struggles placed the franchise's viability in serious doubt. Meanwhile, the ownership of the Minnesota North Stars could no longer sustain the team. Since Minnesota was perceived as the more desirable hockey market at the time, NHL President John Ziegler oversaw a merger between the two franchises, with the Gunds assuming ownership of the North Stars. Minnesota moved into Cleveland's position in the Adams Division. Within three seasons, the North Stars would make the 1981 Stanley Cup Finals, thanks to the Gunds’ willingness to invest in the team and the addition of a number of talented players, including goaltender Gilles Meloche, from the Barons' roster.

After the NHL geographically realigned their divisions in 1981, placing the North Stars in the rough-and-tumble Norris Division, the Gunds would see attendance drop at the Metropolitan Sports Center while the team struggled on the ice. While there was a strong core of die-hard fans, the team often struggled to sell out its home games.

=== San Jose Sharks ===
By 1990, the Gunds had decided on a plan to relocate the franchise to the San Francisco Bay Area, the market they had vacated some 14 years earlier. Ziegler and the league refused to allow this move, but allowed the Gund's to sell the North Stars to Howard Baldwin and granted them an expansion team in the Bay Area, which became the San Jose Sharks, to start play in the 1991–92 season.

With an expansion roster, the Sharks finished last in the NHL standings in their first two seasons, when they played out of the old Cow Palace, a facility the Seals and the NHL had rejected in 1967. With the opening of the San Jose Arena in 1993, however, the Gund's would be able to spend more on the team. The sharks made first-round upsets in the 1994 and 1995 playoffs. Their home arena is consistently one of the loudest in the NHL.

In February 2002, the Gund's sold the Sharks to a consortium, named San Jose Sports & Entertainment Enterprises (SJSE). Gordon sold his share outright while George retained an ownership share as one of the partners in SJSE.

=== Cleveland Cavaliers ===
The Gunds purchased majority interest in the Cleveland Cavaliers from Ted Stepien for $20 million on April 7, 1983. Stepien's Nationwide Advertising Service, Inc. and new cable television station Sports Exchange were also part of the sale. The transaction was approved by the National Basketball Association (NBA) Board of Governors one month later on May 9. The league also arranged for the Gunds to pay a cash sum for a first-round selection in each of the subsequent four NBA drafts to recover the ones traded away by Stepien. They succeeded in keeping the team in Cleveland, Ohio and at Richfield Coliseum, which they also owned. Stepien had threatened to move the team to Toronto. The Gund's replaced the team's logo and uniform design, replacing the "swashbuckling swordsman" with the team's nickname of 'Cavs' with a stylized 'V' made of a net and basketball.

Under the Gund's ownership, attendance figures started to rise, and the Cavs enjoyed a period of competitiveness on the basketball court. In the 1994–95 season, Gund Arena was built and replaced the Coliseum, and attendance figures stayed high. According to the Cavs' media guide, the Cavs had the highest attendance figures in franchise history in 15 of the last 16 seasons, heading into the 2004–05 season.

His most notable achievement in the final years of his ownership was drafting high school prodigy and Akron, Ohio native LeBron James with the first-overall pick in the 2003 NBA draft, a move which helped rejuvenate interest among the fan base. In 2005, Gund sold controlling interest of the team to Quicken Loans founder and billionaire Dan Gilbert, maintaining a minority ownership stake for himself. Gund has an NBA championship to his credit via his status as minority owner of the team during the 2015–16 title-winning season. In April 2021, Gund's minority share was also bought by Gilbert.

=== Cleveland Rockers ===
The city of Cleveland was granted one of the original 8 franchises of the WNBA in October 1996. The Cleveland Rockers got their nickname from Cleveland's Rock and Roll Hall of Fame. In 1997, they started with such players like Isabelle Fijalkowski and former Harlem Globetrotters member Lynette Woodard, who had been the first female player in Globetrotter history. In October 2003, Gund announced that his Gund Arena Company would no longer operate the Rockers. The team folded after the 2003 season as the league was not able to find new ownership for the team.

=== Gund Arena ===
Gund Arena became a cornerstone of the redevelopment of Downtown Cleveland, which was also bolstered by Jacobs Field, the Rock and Roll Hall of Fame, and the new Cleveland Browns Stadium. Under Gund's ownership the Cavs also hosted the 1997 NBA All-Star Game. The Gund's would also operate one of the founding franchises of the WNBA, the Cleveland Rockers. They would also bring hockey to Gund Arena, in a revived version of the Cleveland Barons, who were the top minor-league affiliate of the Gund's San Jose Sharks when the International Hockey League's Cleveland Lumberjacks folded.

== Investments and net worth ==
In addition to his sports franchise interests, Gund and his family have large interests in public companies such as Kellogg's (6.3%) and Align Technology (5.6%) In 2015 Forbes estimated his family's net worth at $3.5 billion. In 2014, along with his wife, Gund signed The Giving Pledge, committing to give a majority of his wealth to philanthropy.

== Personal life ==
A native of Cleveland, Ohio, Gund is a member of one of the city's prominent families. His father George Gund II was president and chairman of Cleveland Trust when it was Ohio's largest bank. Gund II was famous for hiding his wealth from his family and hiding his philanthropy. His sister, Agnes, is a well known philanthropist in her own right.

Gordon Gund resided with his late wife, Llura, in Princeton, New Jersey; together they had two children. Gund has also owned a large home on the north shore of Nantucket since 1978.

Gordon Gund attended Harvard University, where he majored in physical sciences and sociology and played ice hockey. He served in the United States Navy, becoming department head on two destroyers. He then started a banking career, specializing in corporate finance. He gradually began going blind in the 1960s due to retinitis pigmentosa. By 1970, Gund was totally blind. In 1971, Gund co-founded the Retinitis Pigmentosa Foundation (now known as The Foundation Fighting Blindness) which supports research to find cures and treatments for retinal degenerative diseases. The blindness did not prevent him from being active in business and philanthropy. Gund is the former President of the Board of Trustees of his alma mater, Groton School in Groton, Massachusetts. He has honorary doctorates from University of Gothenburg in Sweden, University of Maryland, Baltimore, Whittier College and the University of Vermont. He formerly served as director of the Kellogg Company of Battle Creek, Michigan, and of Corning Incorporated in Corning, New York. Gund is chairman emeritus and a director of the board of directors of The Foundation Fighting Blindness.

== Awards and honors ==
- 2016 NBA Champion (as minority owner of the Cleveland Cavs)
- Cleveland Cavs Wall of Honor (class of 2022)

Sporting positions
Preceded by Ted Stepien	Cleveland Cavaliers principal owner 1983–2005	Succeeded by Dan Gilbert
Preceded by Walter Bush	Minnesota North Stars principal owner 1978–1990; Served alongside: George Gund III	Succeeded by Norman Green
New creation	San Jose Sharks principal owner 1991–2002; Served alongside: George Gund III	Succeeded by Greg Jamison (SJSEE)
