= Dean Lombardi =

American ice hockey player

- Born: March 5, 1958 (age 68); Holyoke, Massachusetts, U.S.
- Occupations: Former general manager and president of the Los Angeles Kings

Dean Lombardi (born March 5, 1958) is an American ice hockey executive with the Philadelphia Flyers. He most recently served as the president, general manager, and alternate governor of the Los Angeles Kings of the National Hockey League (NHL). He previously served as general manager of the San Jose Sharks, a position he held for seven seasons (1996–2003). In 2012, his sixth year as GM for the Kings, the team won its first Stanley Cup. In 2014, he won his second Stanley Cup with the Kings.

== Early life ==
Lombardi grew up in Ludlow, Massachusetts. During the 1974–75 season, as a junior at Ludlow High School, he was an All-Western Massachusetts forward. The next season (1975–76), as a senior, Lombardi was a member of the Wallace Cup champion Springfield Olympics of the New England Junior Hockey League, where he played for top talent developer Gary Dineen. Lombardi then played two more seasons for Dineen and was selected to the All-America Junior hockey team. During his college freshman year, he played hockey at Division 2 power Elmira College before transferring to the University of New Haven, where he was selected the scholar/athlete his senior year, and served as captain his junior and senior years. Lombardi graduated third in his class.

Lombardi later attended law school at Tulane University, graduating with honors and specializing in labor law. He initially became a player's agent under the tutelage of famed agent Art Kaminsky, building a stable of players, including some members of the 1988 United States men's Olympic hockey team. Eventually, Lombardi crossed over into management as assistant general manager to Jack Ferreira with the Minnesota North Stars from 1988 to 1990, then moved with Ferreira to the expansion San Jose Sharks. Lombardi was appointed general manager of the Sharks in 1996. He is the son-in-law of Hockey Hall of Fame winger Bob Pulford, also a longtime NHL general manager and Coach of the Year in 1974–75 (for one of teams Lombardi was general manager of, the Los Angeles Kings).

== As general manager ==
Upon taking over the San Jose Sharks, Lombardi was widely criticized for signing veterans. However, this proved beneficial while stockpiling the team's prospect pool with homegrown talent. During his tenure as Sharks GM, he drafted Patrick Marleau, Brad Stuart, Scott Hannan, Marco Sturm, and Marcel Goc in the first round along with Jonathan Cheechoo, Mark Smith, Ryane Clowe, and Christian Ehrhoff in later rounds.

Lombardi also traded for established veterans, including Owen Nolan, Teemu Selänne, Adam Graves, Vincent Damphousse, Mike Ricci, Kyle McLaren, Mike Vernon, Todd Harvey, Bryan Marchment, and Scott Thornton, while developing their prospects slowly. All would become vital in the Sharks' success during his tenure. The team would increase their point total for six straight seasons during his guidance, becoming only the second general manager in NHL history to accomplish the feat. Only Hall of Fame general manager Bill Torrey accomplished more consecutive seasons of increased point totals, seven (1972–1979), in his overseeing the dynasty of the New York Islanders into the early 1980s.

Lombardi was dismissed on March 18, 2003; he would be replaced by Doug Wilson that May. Lombardi's employment was terminated late in the 2002–03 NHL season, a season in which many felt the Sharks would go deep in the playoffs, but struggled with a slow start and never recovered. This was mainly attributed to the lengthy contract holdout of star goaltender Evgeni Nabokov.

Shortly after his firing, he was hired by the Philadelphia Flyers as a Western Conference scout, a position he held until April 2006, when he was appointed president and general manager of the Los Angeles Kings. He brought along Ferreira as a special advisor. As with the Sharks, Lombardi was a shrewd drafter and developer of talent, drafting the likes of Jonathan Bernier, Trevor Lewis, Alec Martinez, Slava Voynov, and his most notable draft pick, Drew Doughty, the second overall pick in the 2008 NHL entry draft. Lombardi complemented the draft picks with solid veteran signings and trades for Dustin Penner, Mike Richards, and Jeff Carter, among others. As with the Sharks, Lombardi's Kings saw gradual improvement yearly, culminating with a 101-point season in 2009–10. However, the Kings were eliminated in the first round of the 2010 Stanley Cup playoffs by the Vancouver Canucks. The following season, the Kings won the same number of games (46) and had 98 points, but were again defeated in the first round, this time by his former team, the San Jose Sharks.

=== Stanley Cup champions: 2011–12 and 2013–14 ===
The Kings started the 2011–12 NHL season slowly, going 13–12–4, which resulted in Lombardi replacing head coach Terry Murray with Lombardi's former head coach in San Jose, Darryl Sutter. Many believed this was a case of recycling a friend and former coach, but Sutter was exactly what the Kings needed to jumpstart their season. Murray was retained as a scout. Still, it was a battle for the Kings to qualify for the playoffs, which they did by five points for the eighth and final playoff spot in the Western Conference.

That qualification was the beginning of arguably the greatest and most improbable run in playoff history. The Kings set several records in their run to the championship, including being the first eight-seed to win the Stanley Cup, the second team (Calgary Flames) to eliminate the top three seeds in their conference and first eight-seed to do so (Vancouver Canucks, St. Louis Blues, Phoenix Coyotes), the first team to build 3–0 series leads in all four rounds (Canucks, Blues, Coyotes, and New Jersey Devils), and winning the most games on the road for a Cup champion (10) and most consecutive on the road (10). The Kings never faced an elimination game and only lost one game on the road, which did not happen until game five of the Stanley Cup Final in New Jersey, their 11th and final road game.

On June 11, 2012, at the Staples Center in Los Angeles, the Kings won the franchise's first Stanley Cup with a 6–1 victory over the Devils. The Conn Smythe Trophy winner as playoff MVP was goaltender Jonathan Quick, a product of the University of Massachusetts-Amherst of the Hockey East conference. Lombardi was quick to praise Murray for getting the team going in the right direction, and the team had a championship ring presented to Murray. He also complimented his predecessor Dave Taylor for laying the foundation with keen draft picks, including Anže Kopitar. On June 14, 2012, an estimated 250,000 people came out for the Kings victory parade through downtown Los Angeles. On August 8–9, 2012, Lombardi continued the tradition of every member of the current Stanley Cup champions spending a day with the Stanley Cup by bringing it to his native Ludlow, Massachusetts.

On June 13, 2014, Lombardi's Kings won the Stanley Cup championship for the second time in three seasons. However, in the 2014–15 season, despite finishing with a record of 40–27–15 and 95 points, the Kings failed to qualify for the playoffs.

On April 10, 2017, Lombardi was terminated as Kings GM after failing to qualify for the playoffs in the 2016–17 season. At the time of his dismissal, he was the longest-serving Kings' general manager.

Preceded by Chuck Grillo	General manager of the San Jose Sharks; 1996-2003	Succeeded by Doug Wilson
Preceded by Dave Taylor	General manager of the Los Angeles Kings; 2006–2017	Succeeded by Rob Blake
