= List of San Jose Sharks general managers =

The San Jose Sharks are a professional ice hockey team based in San Jose, California. The team is a member of the Pacific Division in the Western Conference of the National Hockey League (NHL). Established for the 1991–92 NHL season, the Sharks initially played games at the Cow Palace before moving to SAP Center at San Jose in 1993. The team has had five general managers since their inception.

== Key ==
Key of terms and definitions
Term	Definition
No.	Number of general managers^{[a]}
Ref(s)	References
–	Does not apply

== General managers ==
General managers of the San Jose Sharks
No.	Name	Tenure	Accomplishments during this term	Ref(s)
1	Jack Ferreira	May 9, 1990 – June 26, 1992	No playoff appearances	
2	Chuck Grillo	June 26, 1992 – March 6, 1996	2 playoff appearances	
2	Dean Lombardi	June 26, 1992 – March 6, 1996	2 playoff appearances	
3	Dean Lombardi	March 6, 1996 – March 18, 2003	1 division title and 5 playoff appearances	
4	Doug Wilson	May 13, 2003 – April 7, 2022	Won Presidents' Trophy (2008–09); 1 Stanley Cup Finals appearance (2016); 1 conference title, 5 division titles, and 14 playoff appearances	
–	Joe Will (interim)	April 7, 2022 – July 5, 2022		
5	Mike Grier	July 5, 2022 – present		

== See also ==
- List of NHL general managers

== Notes ==
- ^{a} A running total of the number of general managers of the franchise. Thus any general manager who has two or more separate terms as general manager is only counted once.
