= Pacific Triangle =

Pacific Triangle may refer to:

- Devil's Sea, also known as the Pacific Bermuda Triangle
- Polynesian Triangle
- Red Triangle (Pacific Ocean)
