= Sharks Sports and Entertainment =

- Company type: Subsidiary of San Jose Sports & Entertainment Enterprises
- Industry: Sports and entertainment
- Founded: 2000 as Silicon Valley Sports & Entertainment
- Founder: Gordon and George Gund III
- Headquarters: San Jose, California, United States
- Owner: Hasso Plattner
- Parent: San Jose Sports & Entertainment Enterprises
- Website: http://www.sharkssports.net

Sharks Sports & Entertainment (SSE) is the privately held parent and limited liability company of the San Jose Sharks of the National Hockey League. Based in San Jose, California, SSE not only oversees all areas of operation for the Sharks but also for several sports-related properties throughout the San Francisco Bay Area.

Established in 2000 as Silicon Valley Sports & Entertainment and rebranded to Sharks Sports & Entertainment in 2011, the focus of SSE is to leverage the organization’s core competencies to grow and/or acquire synergistic businesses that provide patrons with a variety of world-class sports and entertainment options while maintaining a championship-caliber National Hockey League team in San Jose.

SSE is owned by Sharks owner, German businessman, and philanthropist Dr. Hasso Plattner. SSE was previously owned by George Gund III and his brother Gordon Gund.

== Current properties ==
Sharks Sports & Entertainment currently oversees all areas of business operation for several sports and entertainment entities in the Bay Area including:

- San Jose Sharks of the National Hockey League (NHL)
- San Jose Barracuda of the American Hockey League (AHL)
- SAP Center at San Jose, the premier sports and entertainment venue in Santa Clara County, California
- Sharks Ice San Jose, a public ice facility located in San Jose, California
- Sharks Ice at Fremont, a public Ice facility located in Fremont, California
- Oakland Ice Center, a public ice facility located in Oakland, California

== Former properties ==
Other sports properties previously managed by Sharks Sports & Entertainment include:

- SAP Open, an ATP men’s professional tennis tournament played in San Jose, California
- Regions Morgan Keegan Championships tennis tournament, a men's Association of Tennis Professionals tournament played in Memphis, Tennessee
- Cellular South Cup, a professional Women's Tennis Association tournament played in Memphis, Tennessee
- Racquet Club of Memphis, a private racquet, swim, and fitness club in Memphis, Tennessee
- San Jose Earthquakes of Major League Soccer
- Strikeforce (mixed martial arts), a former San Jose-based mixed martial arts organization
- Worcester Sharks of the American Hockey League (AHL)
- Cleveland Barons of the American Hockey League (AHL)
- San Jose Rhinos of Roller Hockey International (RHI)
- San Jose Grizzlies of the Continental Indoor Soccer League (CISL)
- SVS&E Publishing

== Other significant events ==
Other significant sporting events to come through San Jose that were co-promoted or managed by SSE include:

- National Hockey League’s Stanley Cup Final (2016)
- NHL All-Star Game (1997, 2019)
- NCAA Division I men's basketball tournament (2002, 2007, 2010, 2013, 2017, 2019)
- NCAA Division I Women's Basketball Final Four (1999)
- U.S. Figure Skating Championships (1996, 2012, 2018)
- U.S. Olympic Trials for Men’s and Women’s Gymnastics (2012, 2016)
- Super Bowl 50 Media Day (2016)
