= List of San Jose Sharks records =

This is a list of franchise records for the San Jose Sharks of the National Hockey League.

== Franchise records ==
=== Franchise single season ===
- Most wins by team: 53 in 2008–09
- Most points by team: 117 in 2008–09
- Most goals by team: 265 in 2005–06
- Fewest goals against by team: 183 in 2003–04

=== Franchise streaks ===
- Longest winning streak: 11 games (2007–08), (4 games in 2011–12 + 7 games in 2012–13. All games in regular season)
- Longest losing streak: 17 games (1992–93)

== Individual records ==
=== Career leaders ===
	All-time leader		Active leader^{‡}	
Games	1,607	Patrick Marleau	490	Mario Ferraro
Consecutive games	738	Patrick Marleau	151	Macklin Celebrini
Goals	522	Patrick Marleau	70	Macklin Celebrini
Assists	804	Joe Thornton	113	William Eklund
Points	1,111	Patrick Marleau	178	Macklin Celebrini
Points (defenseman)	594	Brent Burns	114	Mario Ferraro
Powerplay goals	163	Patrick Marleau	17	William Eklund
Shorthanded goals	17	Patrick Marleau	3	Barclay Goodrow
Game winning goals	101	Patrick Marleau	9	Macklin Celebrini
Hat tricks	9	Jonathan Cheechoo	3	Macklin Celebrini
Plus-minus	+161	Joe Thornton	+7	Vincent Desharnais
Shots	3,953	Patrick Marleau	533	Mario Ferraro
Penalty minutes	1,001	Jeff Odgers	383	Barclay Goodrow
Goaltender games	563	Evgeni Nabokov	60	Yaroslav Askarov
Goaltender wins	293	Evgeni Nabokov	25	Yaroslav Askarov
Goaltender losses	178	Evgeni Nabokov	26	Yaroslav Askarov
Goaltender minutes	32,490	Evgeni Nabokov	3,313	Yaroslav Askarov
Shutouts	50	Evgeni Nabokov	N/A	N/A
Goals against average^{†} (minimum 25 GP)	2.12	Brian Boucher	2.87	Alex Nedeljkovic
Save percentage^{††} (minimum 25 GP)	.919	Brian Boucher	.896	Alex Nedeljkovic
Goaltender points	10	Evgeni Nabokov	N/A	N/A
Coaching games	540	Todd McLellan	164	Ryan Warsofsky
Coaching wins	311	Todd McLellan	59	Ryan Warsofsky

=== Single season leaders ===
- Most goals: Jonathan Cheechoo, 56 (2005–06)
- Most points: Macklin Celebrini, 115 (2025–26)
- Most assists: Joe Thornton, 92 (2006–07)
- Most PIM: Link Gaetz, 326 (1991–92)
- Most points, rookie: Macklin Celebrini, 63 (2024–25)
- Most goals, rookie: Logan Couture, 32 (2010–2011)
- Most points, defenseman: Erik Karlsson, 101 (2022–23)
- Most games played: Evgeni Nabokov, 77 (2007–08)
- Most minutes: Evgeni Nabokov, 4,560 (2007–08)
- Most goaltending wins: Evgeni Nabokov, 46 (2007–08)
- Most shutouts: Evgeni Nabokov, 9 (2003–04)
- Most consecutive starts: Evgeni Nabokov, 43 (to begin the 2007–08 NHL season)
- Lowest GAA^{†}: Vesa Toskala, 2.06 (2003–04)
- Highest save %^{†}: Evgeni Nabokov, 0.930 (2003–04)
- † Goalie must play at least 25 games

=== Single game leaders ===
- Most PIM, single regulation game: Jody Shelley, 41 (2007–08)
- Most points, single playoff game: Jeremy Roenick, 4 (2007–08)
- Most points, single playoff period: Kevin Labanc, 4 (2018–19)
- Most goals, single game: Timo Meier, 5 (2021–22)
