= San Jose Sports & Entertainment Enterprises =

American sports management company

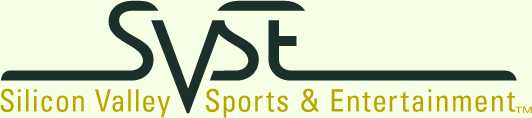
- Type: Private
- Industry: Sports management
- Headquarters: San Jose, California, United States
- Brands: San Jose Sharks; San Jose Barracuda; SAP Center
- Divisions: Sharks Sports and Entertainment

San Jose Sports & Entertainment Enterprises (SJSEE) is a privately held company based in San Jose, California which owns the San Jose Sharks of the National Hockey League, the San Jose Barracuda of the American Hockey League, and oversees all areas of operation and management of the city-owned SAP Center at San Jose.

The company once hosted SAP Open between 1995 and 2012.

== Investors ==
SJSEE, is currently owned by Sharks owner, German businessman, and philanthropist Dr. Hasso Plattner. Plattner also serves as the team’s representative on the National Hockey League’s Board of Governors.

== History ==
In October 2011, the Gund's sold SJSEE to a group of local investors assembled by former Sharks president Greg Jamison which included Plattner, Kevin Compton, a partner at Kleiner Perkins, and Stratton Sclavos, former chairman and CEO of VeriSign. In 2014, Plattner purchased the ownership shares of both Compton and Sclavos and subsequently bought the remaining shares owned by former San Jose mayor Tom McEnery, E. Floyd Kvamme, and Harvey Armstrong to become the franchise’s majority owner.

Other former investors include former San Francisco 49ers player Brent Jones, venture capitalist Boots Del Biaggio, and former Brocade Communications Systems CEO Gregory Reyes. George Gund III maintained a minority stake in the team until his death in 2013.
