= Little Native Hockey League =

First Nations youth ice hockey tournament in Ontario, Canada

- Sport: Ice hockey
- Founded: 1971
- President: Patrick Madahbee (acting)
- Motto: Sportsmanship; Education; Citizenship; Respect
- Website: www.lnhl.ca

The Little Native Hockey League (LNHL), also known as the Little NHL, is the largest annual ice hockey tournament for First Nation youth in Ontario, Canada.

== History ==
The Little Native Hockey League was founded by Earl Abotossaway, former Chief Jim McGregor, James D. Debassiage, Reverend Leonard Self, and Norman Debassiage in 1971. They established the tournament on the basis on four pillars: education, citizenship, sportsmanship, and respect. The inaugural tournament took place in Little Current on Manitoulin Island during Christmas break in 1971 and featured seventeen teams and 200 players.

The largest holding of the event was the 2018 Little NHL tournament, which attracted 209 teams and about 3,000 players and was held in Mississauga.

== About ==
=== Executive committee ===
The acting president of the Little Native Hockey League is Patrick Wedaseh Madahbee, a member of Aundeck Omni Kaning First Nation. He was appointed to the position after previous president Marian Jacko, a member of Wiikwemkoong Unceded Territory, was obligated to step down following her selection to a one-year term on the Board of Directors of Hockey Canada in December 2022. Jacko had held the position since December 2018 and is expected to return to the Little NHL following her leave of absence.

=== Hosts ===
Ontario First Nation communities act as hosts for the tournament. First Nations that have hosted the Little NHL include Aundeck Omni Kaning, Atikameksheng, Curve Lake, Dokis, Fort William, Garden River, M'Chigeeng, Nipissing, Sagamok, Saugeen, Six Nations, Walpole Island, Wausauksing, Wiikwemkoong, and Whitefish River.

==== Cities ====
Historically, the event was able to be staged in mid-sized communities, like those on Manitoulin Island, and smaller cities, like Greater Sudbury and Sault Ste. Marie, but the ever-increasing scale of the LNHL has made it such that only larger cities like Mississauga have “sufficient rinks and hotels to accommodate all of the participating players as well as their family member and supporters.” In 2018, Ontario Regional Chief Isadore Day explained that cities of similar size to Mississauga or larger are the only places capable of supporting an event at the scale of the modern Little NHL.

=== Divisions of play ===
Teams participating in the tournament are divided by age and gender. The only age category not separated by gender is under-7 (U7; formerly called Tykes) for five and six years old players. Girls are permitted to play in boys competitions but boys are not permitted to play in any girls division. All games are played on full ice hockey rinks, except for the U7 level, which plays half-ice games. All age divisions for boys have two levels of competition: Competitive and Recreational.

Age categories for boys and girls divisions:

- U9 (formerly Novice) – ages 7 & 8
- U11 (formerly Atom) – ages 9 & 10
- U13 (formerly Peewee) – ages 11 & 12
- U15 (formerly Bantam) – ages 13 & 14
- U18 (formerly Midget) – ages 15–17

=== Eligibility ===
All teams must represent an Ontario First Nation to be eligible for the tournament. Every player is expected to compete for their First Nation community as indicated on their status card with the exception of those players who have used the residency option or have been granted release by their First Nation. For players to be eligible, they must have one parent of native birth and a federal band number, or may qualify by presenting a legal affidavit proving native descent.

=== Hall of Fame ===
The Little NHL has a hall of fame to honour the alumni, builders, and friends of the tournament.

== Notable alumni ==
=== Hall of Fame Alumni of the Little NHL ===
The Little NHL Hall of Fame has inducted ten former players who “have advanced to play hockey at a higher calibre” and who “have been instrumental in advocating hockey development in their communities and continue to support participation in the Little NHL Tournament,” designating them “Alumni of the Little NHL.”

35th Anniversary (2006)

- Barry Hawk Tabobondung
- Gerard Peltier
- Ted Nolan

40th Anniversary (2011)

- Kathryn Corbiere
- Dave Avery
- Jonathan Cheechoo

45th Anniversary (2016)

- Maryanne Menefee
- Kelly Babstock
- Mervin Cheechoo
- Chris Simon

=== Other alumni ===
Many other former participants have gone on to play high level ice hockey at the Junior B, Junior A/Tier II, major junior (OHL, etc.), college (NCAA, U Sports, etc.), and professional (AHL, NHL PHF, etc.) levels, including:

- Reggie Leach
- Cody McCormick
- Brandon Montour
- Jordan Nolan
- Jason Simon
