= Chuck Grillo =

American professional ice hockey executive

- Born: September 24, 1939 (age 85); Hibbing, Minnesota, U.S.
- Occupation(s): Former Director of Player Personnel and General Manager of the San Jose Sharks (1992–1996)

Chuck Grillo (born July 24, 1939) is an American former professional ice hockey executive with the San Jose Sharks of the National Hockey League and owner of Minnesota Hockey Camps through 2016. From 1992 until 1996, Grillo served as the Sharks' Director of Player Personnel as well as general manager for the last two of those years.

== Hockey career ==
Grillo became involved with professional ice hockey with the New York Rangers and Minnesota North Stars in the 1980s as a scout. He eventually became the director of player personnel. When the Minnesota franchise was split in two and the Sharks spun off in 1991, Grillo became a member of the Sharks staff. He was named Vice-president of player personnel, and was responsible for player acquisitions and trades, starting in 1992, after GM Jack Ferreira was dismissed. He was named executive vice-president in 1995 and held the title until 1996 when Dean Lombardi was hired as General Manager of the Sharks. He held a position as a scout with the Pittsburgh Penguins from 2001 to 2011.

Before professional ice hockey, Chuck served in the United States Marines Corp. Grillo was a coach for 16 years in Minnesota high schools, earning the Minnesota State High School League Coach of the Year in 1973. He owned and operated Minnesota Hockey Camps ice hockey development center in Nisswa, Minnesota for 39 years and continues to be active each summer as a volunteer; working the same hours he did as an owner. Other honors include induction into Bemidji High School and Minnesota State Hockey Coaches Halls of Fame. State and Base Championship titles in Fast Pitch Softball (1961), Senior Hockey (1965), and Guantanamo Base Championship in Fast Pitch Softball (1960).

Chuck has his master's degree in Guidance Counseling and eighty (80) credits toward his Doctorate in Education. He also has a BS degree in Industrial Education.

Preceded by Jack Ferreira	General Manager of the San Jose Sharks; 1992-96	Succeeded by Dean Lombardi
