= San Jose Sharks =

National Hockey League team in San Jose, California

- 2026–27 San Jose Sharks season
- Conference: Western
- Division: Pacific
- Founded: 1991
- History: San Jose Sharks; 1991–present
- Home arena: SAP Center
- City: San Jose, California
- Team colors: Pacific teal, white, black, orange
- Media: NBC Sports California; Sharks Audio Network
- Owner(s): San Jose Sports & Entertainment Enterprises (Hasso Plattner, governor)
- General manager: Mike Grier
- Head coach: Ryan Warsofsky
- Captain: Macklin Celebrini
- Minor league affiliates: San Jose Barracuda (AHL); Wichita Thunder (ECHL)
- Stanley Cups: 0
- Conference championships: 1 (2015–16)
- Presidents' Trophies: 1 (2008–09)
- Division championships: 6 (2001–02, 2003–04, 2007–08, 2008–09, 2009–10, 2010–11)
- Official website: nhl.com/sharks

The San Jose Sharks are a professional ice hockey team based in San Jose, California. The Sharks compete in the National Hockey League (NHL) as a member of the Pacific Division in the Western Conference. The franchise is owned by San Jose Sports & Entertainment Enterprises. The Sharks were founded on May 9, 1990, after the owners of the Minnesota North Stars sold that team and purchased an expansion team based in the San Francisco Bay Area. Beginning play in the 1991–92 season, the team initially played its home games at the Cow Palace, before moving to its present home, now named SAP Center at San Jose, in 1993; the SAP Center is known locally as "the Shark Tank". They were the first team to be based in the region since the California Golden Seals relocated to Cleveland in 1976. The Sharks have advanced to the Stanley Cup Final once, losing to the Pittsburgh Penguins in 2016. They have won the Presidents' Trophy once, as the team with the league's best regular season record in the 2008–09 season. They have also won six division titles as a member of the Pacific Division since 1993.

The Sharks are affiliated with the San Jose Barracuda of the American Hockey League (AHL) and the Wichita Thunder of the ECHL.

== History ==
=== San Francisco Bay Area hockey ===
Ice hockey in the San Francisco Bay Area began with the San Francisco Seals of the Western Hockey League (WHL) when they were awarded an expansion franchise for San Francisco on April 23, 1961. The Seals won two WHL championships and were renamed to the California Seals in 1966.

In 1967, the California Golden Seals joined the NHL as part of the 1967 NHL expansion. They played their seasons from 1967 to 1976, but were neither successful on the ice nor at the box office. Gordon and George Gund III became minority owners of the Golden Seals in 1974, and were instrumental in their move to Cleveland in 1976 and a 1978 merger with the Minnesota North Stars, which they purchased that year.

In 1988, a group led by former Hartford Whalers owner Howard Baldwin was pushing the NHL to bring a team to San Jose, where a new arena was being built. Eventually, the League struck a compromise: the Gunds would sell their share of the North Stars to Baldwin's group, with the Gunds receiving an expansion team in the Bay Area to begin play in the 1991–92 season and being allowed to take a certain number of players from the North Stars to their new club.

=== San Jose Sharks birth ===
In return, the North Stars would be allowed to participate as an equal partner in an expansion draft with the new Bay Area team. On May 5, 1990, the Gunds officially sold their share of the North Stars to Baldwin and were awarded a new team for the Bay Area, based in San Jose. The owners paid to the league an expansion fee of US$45 million and the new franchise was approved on May 9.

Over 5,000 potential names were submitted by mail for the new team. While the first-place finisher was "Blades", the Gunds were concerned about the name's potentially negative association with weapons, and went with the runner-up, "Sharks". The name was inspired by the large number of sharks living in the Pacific Ocean. Seven varieties live there, and one area of water near the Bay Area is known as the "red triangle" because of its shark population. Matt Levine—the team's first marketing head—said of the new name, "Sharks are relentless, determined, swift, agile, bright and fearless. We plan to build an organization that has all those qualities." Jack Ferreira was hired as the team's first general manager.

=== Cow Palace years (1991–1993) ===
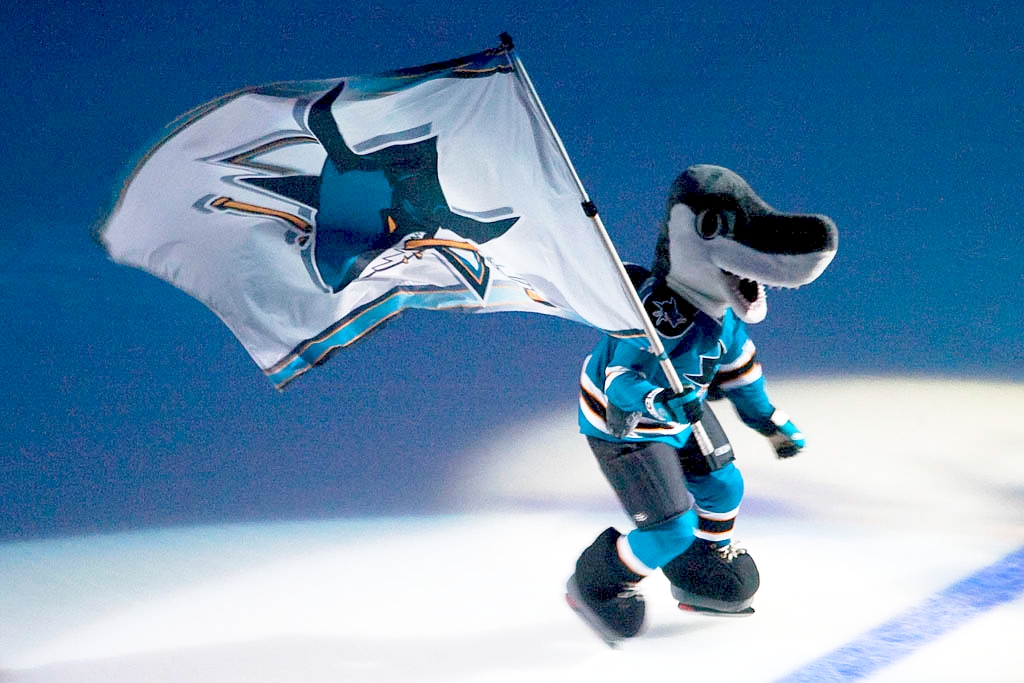
S. J. Sharkie, the Sharks' mascot, made his debut during the 1991–92 season.

For their first two seasons, the Sharks played at the Cow Palace in Daly City, just outside San Francisco. Pat Falloon was their first draft choice and led the team in points during their first season. The team was placed in the Campbell Conference's Smythe Division. George Kingston was their first head coach. Though the 1991–92 roster consisted primarily of NHL journeymen, minor leaguers and rookies, the Sharks had at least one notable player when they acquired 14-year veteran and former Norris Trophy-winning defenseman Doug Wilson from the Chicago Blackhawks on September 6, 1991. Wilson was named the team's first captain and All-Star representative in the inaugural season. However, the team struggled in its first two seasons. Between their first and second seasons, they fired Ferreira, promoting Kingston, director of player personnel Chuck Grillo, and assistant GM Dean Lombardi as the shared general manager. Their 71 losses in the 1992–93 season is an NHL record. During this season, they suffered a 17-game losing streak (a then-NHL record), and won only 11 games while earning 24 points in the standings. Kingston was fired following the end of the 1992–93 season.

Despite the Sharks' futility in the standings, the team led the NHL's merchandise sales with $150 million, accounting for 27% of the NHL's total and behind only National Basketball Association champions Chicago Bulls among all North American leagues.

The inaugural year also saw the introduction of the San Jose Sharks mascot, "S. J. Sharkie". On January 28, 1992, at a game against the New York Rangers, the then-unnamed mascot emerged from a Zamboni during an intermission. A "Name the Mascot" contest began that night, with the winning name of "S. J. Sharkie" being announced on April 15, 1992.

=== Early success and rebuilding (1993–1996) ===
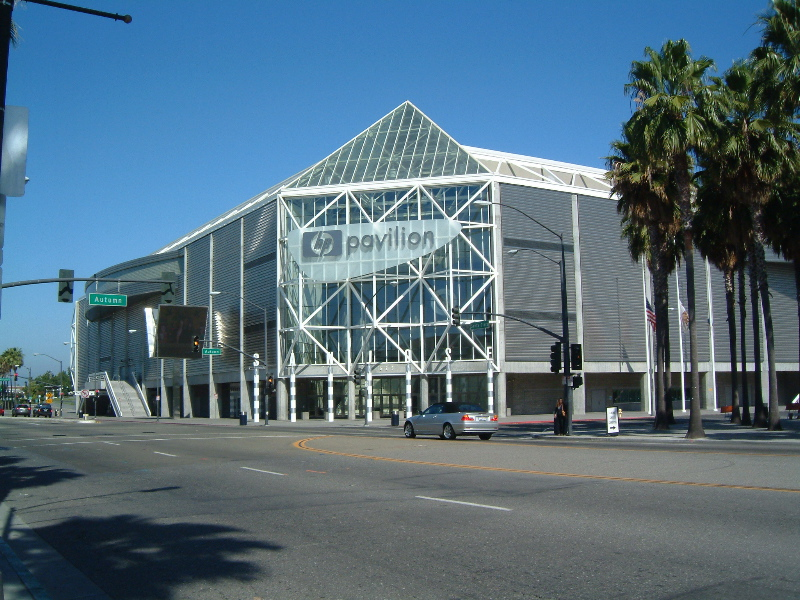
The Sharks moved into their new home, the San Jose Arena (now the SAP Center) in 1993.

For their third season, 1993–94, the Sharks moved to their new and current home, the San Jose Arena, and were placed in the Western Conference's Pacific Division. Under new head coach Kevin Constantine, they finished with a 33–35–16 record and made the Stanley Cup playoffs for the first time in team history with 82 points, an NHL record 58-point jump from the previous season. They were seeded eighth in the Western Conference playoffs and faced the Detroit Red Wings, the top-seeded Western Conference team and a favorite to win the Stanley Cup. In one of the biggest upsets in Stanley Cup playoff history, the Sharks defeated the Red Wings in seven games. In game seven at Joe Louis Arena, Jamie Baker scored the game-winning goal in the third period after goaltender Chris Osgood was out of position and the Sharks won 3–2, becoming the first eighth-seed in the history of North American professional sports to defeat the first seed in a playoff series. In the second round, the Sharks had a 3–2 series lead over the Toronto Maple Leafs, but lost the final two games in Toronto.

In 1994–95, the Sharks earned their second-straight playoff berth and again reached the second round. Ray Whitney scored the double-overtime game-winning goal of game seven of the conference quarterfinals against the Calgary Flames. Despite their success against Calgary, they lost in a four-game sweep to Detroit. Constantine was given a three-year deal prior to the 1995–96 season.

In the regular season, Constantine was fired after a 3–18–4 start to the season and replaced by Jim Wiley. The Sharks finished last in the Pacific Division and failed to make the playoffs. The team also traded out defenseman Sandis Ozoliņš to the Colorado Avalanche for Owen Nolan. Grillo was also fired with Lombardi holding the sole responsibility of general manager.

=== Dean Lombardi era (1996–2003) ===
The 1996–97 season was no better under Al Sims, with the Sharks again finishing last and winning only 27 games. Sims was fired after his one season of play. Their standing would help them draft Patrick Marleau second overall in the 1997 NHL entry draft. The Sharks returned to the playoffs in 1997–98 with goaltender Mike Vernon, whom they acquired from the Red Wings, and new head coach Darryl Sutter. They were eliminated by the Dallas Stars in the conference quarterfinals. Over the summer, they acquired goaltender Steve Shields, and during the 1998–99 season, San Jose acquired Montreal Canadiens forward Vincent Damphousse. However, the Colorado Avalanche defeated them in the conference quarterfinals. In the playoffs, the Sharks eliminated the Presidents' Trophy-winning St. Louis Blues by coming back from a 3–1 series deficit to win in seven games. However, the Sharks were defeated in the second round of the playoffs by the Stars.

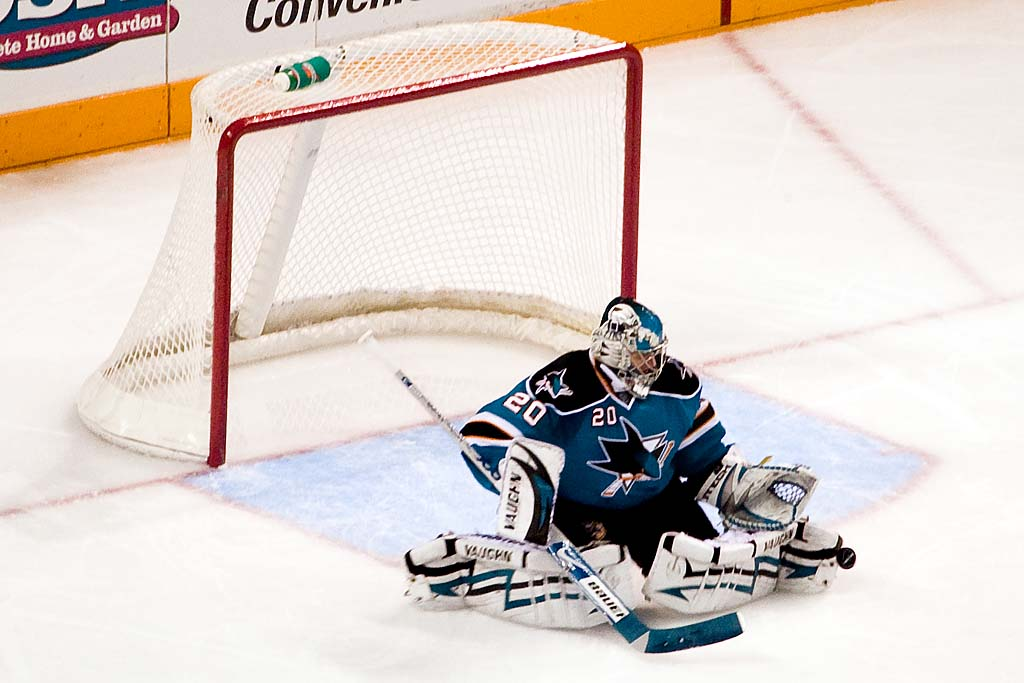
Evgeni Nabokov was awarded the Calder Memorial Trophy in the 2000–01 season.

In 2000–01, Kazakh goaltender Evgeni Nabokov, who was originally drafted in 1994, won the Calder Memorial Trophy as the NHL's best rookie. The team also acquired Finnish star forward Teemu Selänne from the Mighty Ducks of Anaheim. In the 2001 playoffs, the St. Louis Blues eliminated the Sharks in six games in the first round. In 2001–02, the Sharks won their first Pacific Division title, but they fell to the Avalanche in the second round in seven games.

Following the 2001–02 season, the Gunds sold the Sharks to a group of local investors headed by team president Greg Jamison. The 2002–03 season did not start well for the Sharks as they began 8–12–2–2 and fired Sutter as head coach. Ron Wilson was hired as head coach a few days later. Near the 2003 NHL trade deadline, captain Owen Nolan was traded to the Toronto Maple Leafs. Lombardi's tenure with the team ended with his dismissal on March 18, 2003. Doug Wilson was named to the role on May 13.

=== Doug Wilson era (2003–2022) ===
==== Resurgence and arrival of Joe Thornton (2003–2008) ====
The 2003–04 season saw the team turn around their record from the previous season, finishing atop the Pacific Division. In the 2004 playoffs, the Sharks defeated the St. Louis Blues in the conference quarterfinals and the Colorado Avalanche in the conference semifinals, advancing to the conference finals. However, they fell to the Calgary Flames in six games. During that season, without a captain following Nolan's trade, San Jose utilized a rotating captaincy. When the job eventually fell to Patrick Marleau, he kept the captaincy. During the offseason, forward Vincent Damphousse was left in free agency to the Colorado Avalanche.

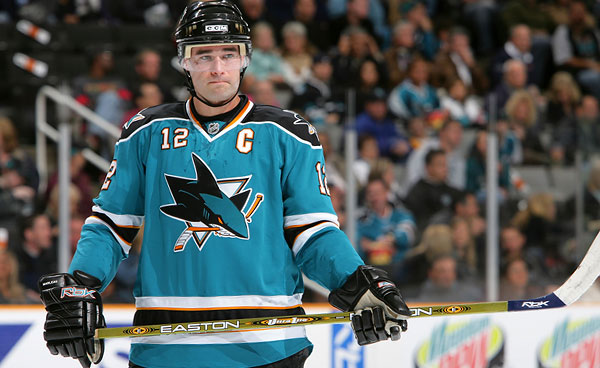
Patrick Marleau was named the Sharks' team captain in the second half of the 2003–04 season, maintaining the position until 2009.

During the 2005–06 season the Sharks traded Brad Stuart, Wayne Primeau, and Marco Sturm to the Boston Bruins in exchange for star player Joe Thornton. In the 2006 playoffs, the Sharks fell to the Edmonton Oilers in the conference semifinals. Thornton was awarded the Hart Memorial Trophy as the NHL's Most Valuable Player, as well as the Art Ross Trophy for leading the league in points, with 125. Jonathan Cheechoo was awarded the Maurice "Rocket" Richard Trophy for scoring the most goals during the regular season with 56.

During the 2006–07 season they traded for defenseman Craig Rivet and winger Bill Guerin at the trade deadline. The Sharks finished the regular season second in the Pacific Division with a 51–26–5 record. In the conference quarterfinals, the Sharks defeated the Nashville Predators for the second consecutive year. In the conference semifinals, the Sharks were defeated by the Detroit Red Wings.

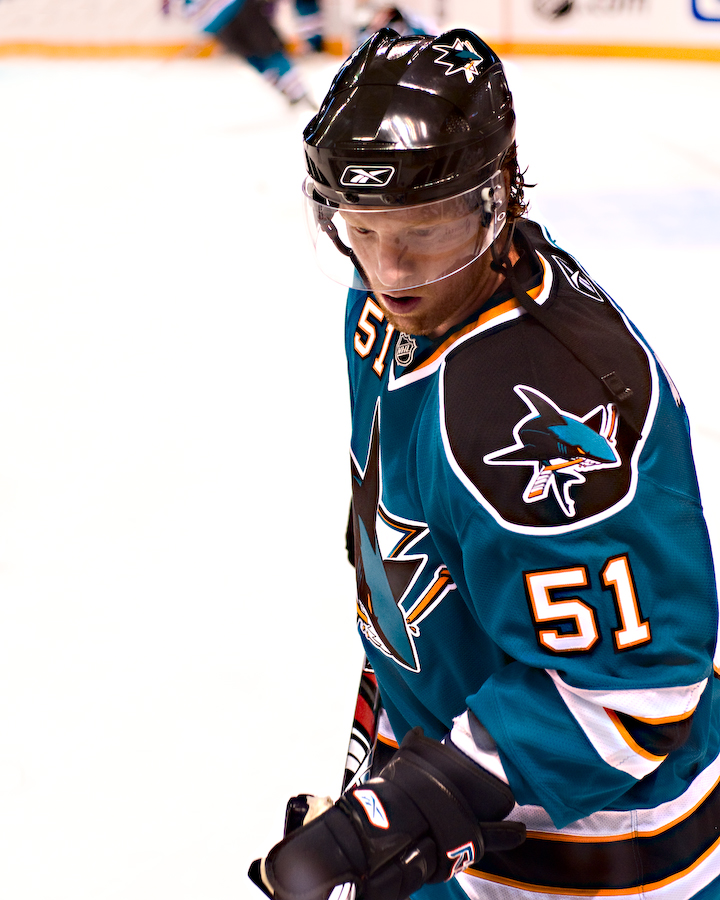
In an effort to bolster their team for the 2008 playoffs, the Sharks acquired Brian Campbell prior to the League's trade deadline.

In the 2007–08 season, the Sharks picked up Brian Campbell at the trade deadline, giving up Steve Bernier. The Sharks captured their third Pacific Division title with a franchise-record 108 points. San Jose started the 2008 playoffs beating the Calgary Flames four games to three. San Jose eventually lost to the Dallas Stars in the conference semifinals. Game six required four overtime periods, and was the longest game in the team's history. Following the playoff loss, the Sharks fired Ron Wilson as head coach.

==== Todd McLellan as head coach (2008–2015) ====
On June 11, 2008, the San Jose Sharks named former Detroit Red Wings assistant coach Todd McLellan as their new head coach for the 2008–09 season. During the offseason, the Sharks signed defenseman Rob Blake and acquired defensemen Dan Boyle and Brad Lukowich. Midway through the season, San Jose added Claude Lemieux to their roster. Lemieux was rejoining the NHL after a five-year absence. The Sharks finished the regular season as Presidents' Trophy champions with 53 wins and 117 points, both franchise records. Despite their successful regular season, the Sharks were eliminated by the eighth-seeded Anaheim Ducks in six games in the first round of the playoffs. The team was heavily criticized for once again failing to succeed in the postseason.

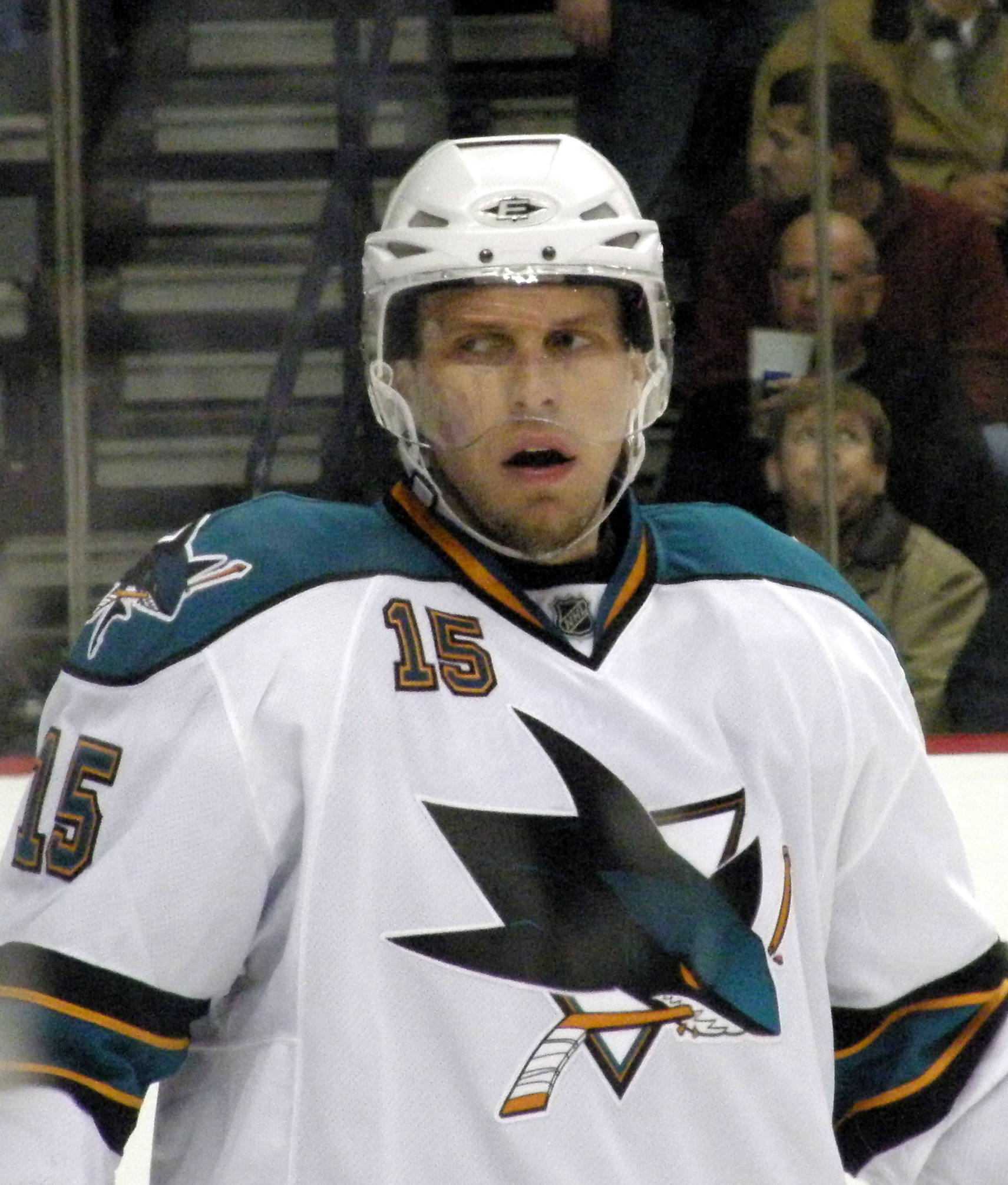
Dany Heatley was acquired by the Sharks during the 2009 offseason. The Sharks sent Milan Michálek and Jonathan Cheechoo to the Ottawa Senators in return for Heatley.

In the 2009 offseason, Milan Michálek and Jonathan Cheechoo were sent to the Ottawa Senators in exchange for Dany Heatley and a draft pick. Claude Lemieux also announced his retirement from the NHL. Another move by San Jose was stripping Patrick Marleau of the captaincy and assigning it to the newly re-signed Rob Blake. On February 7, 2010, San Jose acquired Niclas Wallin from the Carolina Hurricanes. The Sharks finished the 2009–10 regular season leading the Western Conference with 113 points. In the conference quarterfinals, the Sharks eliminated the Colorado Avalanche. In the conference semifinals, the Sharks defeated the Detroit Red Wings. The Chicago Blackhawks beat the Sharks in the conference finals with a four-game sweep.

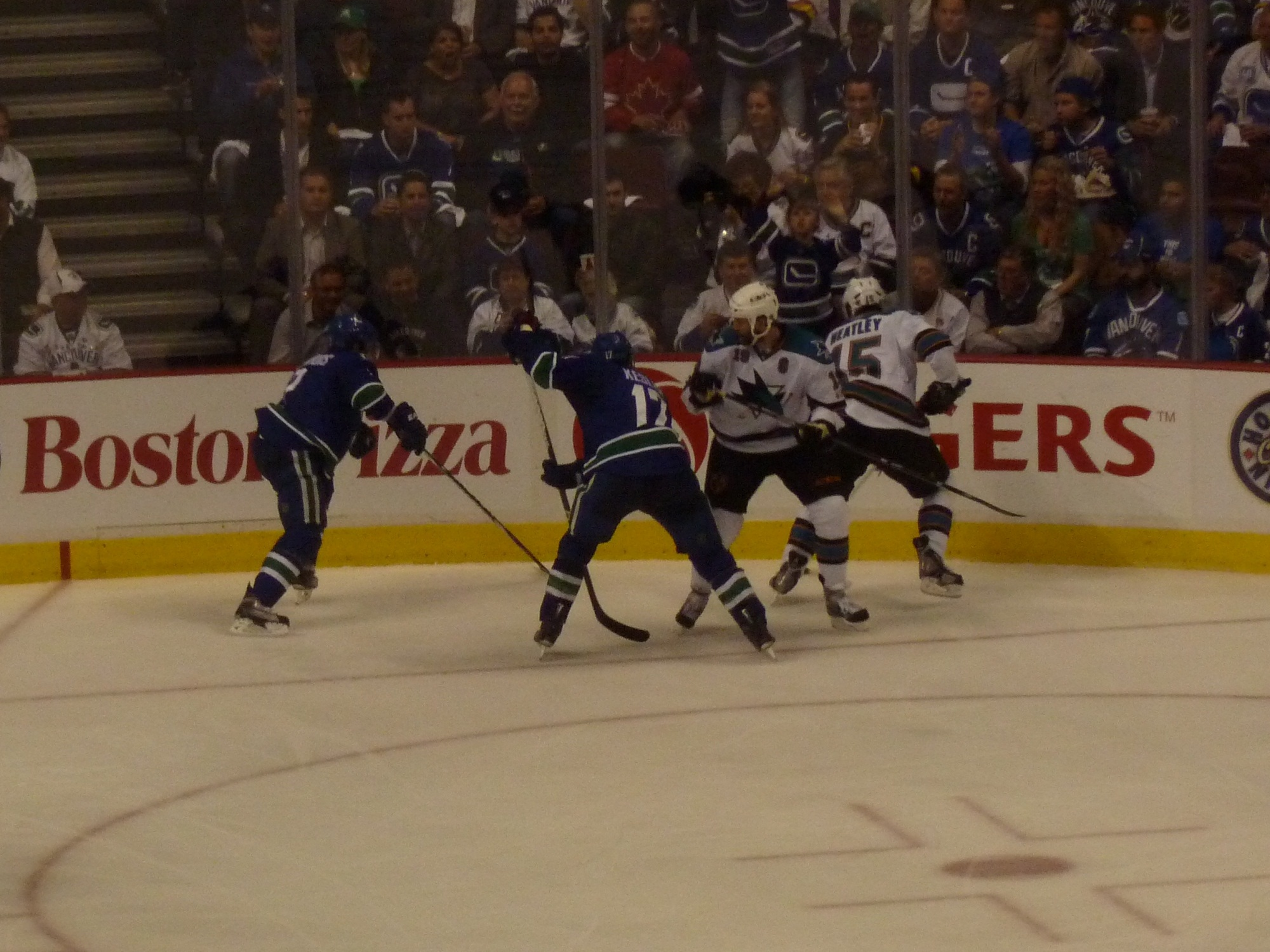
The Sharks faced the Vancouver Canucks in the 2011 conference finals, losing the series 4–1.

In the 2010–11 offseason, they Sharks opted not to re-sign long-time goaltender Evgeni Nabokov after playing ten seasons with the team. On September 2, 2010, the Sharks signed former member of the Chicago Blackhawks and Stanley Cup-winning goaltender Antti Niemi to a one-year contract. On March 1, 2011, Niemi signed a four-year contract extension with San Jose worth $15.2 million. On March 31, 2011, the Sharks clinched their seventh consecutive playoff berth with a 6–0 victory over the Dallas Stars. Five days later, they clinched their sixth Pacific Division championship. Entering the 2011 playoffs as the second seed in the Western Conference, the Sharks opened their playoff run with the franchise's first playoff series against intrastate rival, the Los Angeles Kings. The Kings took a 4–0 lead in game three but five-second-period goals by the Sharks capped with a Devin Setoguchi overtime winner gave the Sharks a 6–5 victory and tied them for the second-biggest comeback in Stanley Cup playoff history. They would win the series in six games, with captain Joe Thornton scoring the series-winning overtime goal. The Sharks advanced to the conference semifinals to face the third-seed Detroit Red Wings. Although they went out to a 3–0 series lead like the previous season, the Sharks dropped three more games as the Red Wings became the eighth team in NHL history to force a game seven after being down 3–0 in the series. However, they would not become the fourth team in history to pull off the comeback as the Sharks prevailed, 3–2 in game seven. The Sharks advanced to the conference finals series against the Vancouver Canucks, but lost in five games.

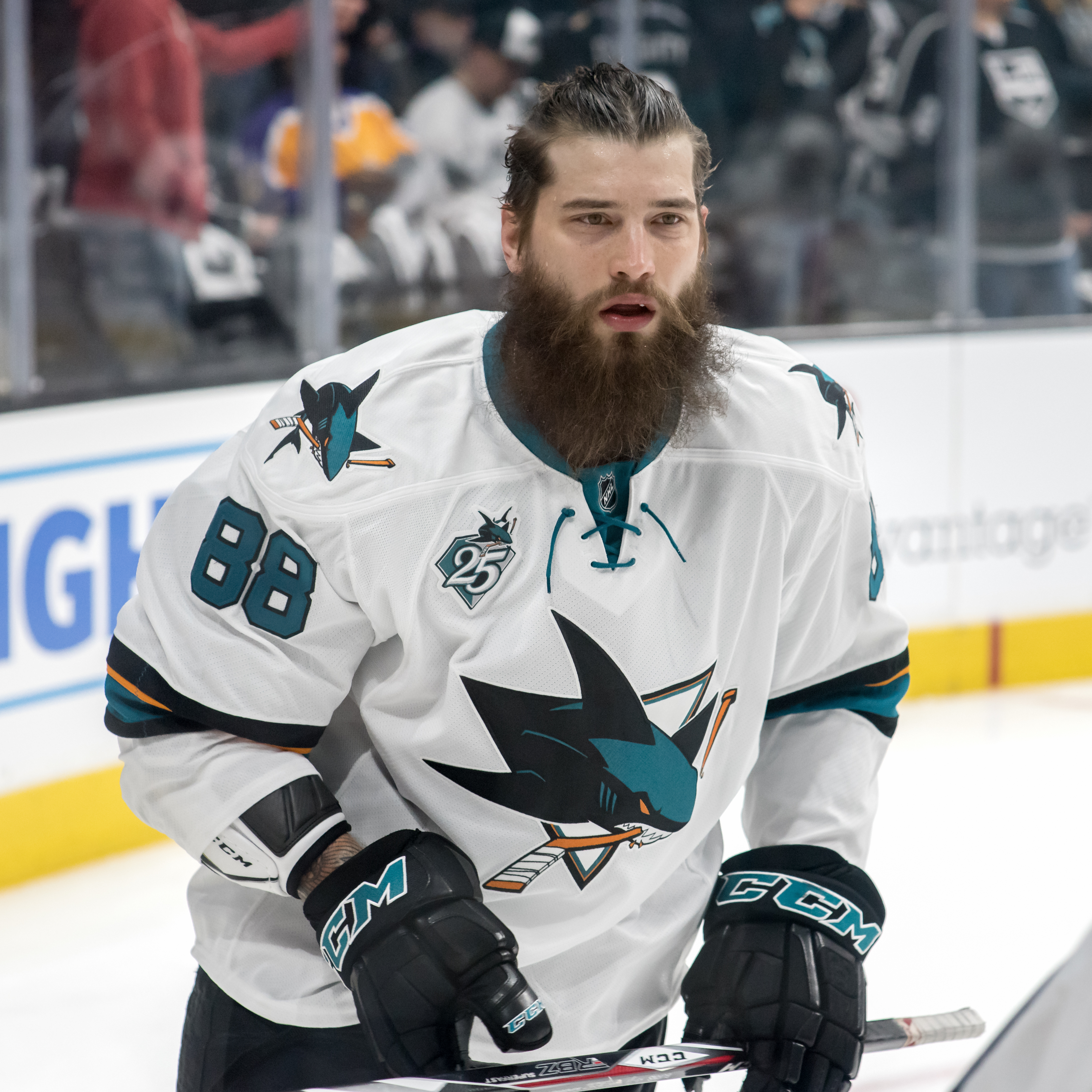
During the 2011 NHL entry draft the Sharks acquired Brent Burns through a trade with the Minnesota Wild.

The first major move made by San Jose in the 2011 offseason was to trade winger Devin Setoguchi, the Sharks' 2010 first-round pick Charlie Coyle and a first-round pick in the 2011 NHL entry draft to the Minnesota Wild for All-Star defenseman Brent Burns and a 2012 second-round pick. This came after Setoguchi had signed a three-year, $9 million contract extension with the Sharks. The Sharks continued their offseason retool by orchestrating a second transaction with the Wild, shipping Dany Heatley to Minnesota in exchange for Martin Havlát. The Sharks finished the 2011–12 season with a 43–29–10 record, good for 96 points and the seventh seed in the Stanley Cup playoffs. However, after winning game one of their first-round series with the St. Louis Blues in overtime, they lost the final four games of the series. It was later announced that McLellan would remain on the bench for a fifth season.

During the lockout-shortened 2012–13 season, Raffi Torres was acquired. In the first round of the 2013 playoffs, the Sharks swept the Vancouver Canucks, their first series-sweep in franchise history. The Sharks would subsequently fall in seven games to the Los Angeles Kings in the second round of the playoffs.

The Sharks started the 2013–14 season 8–0–1, and were the last team in the NHL to stay undefeated in regulation until October 25, when they lost to the Boston Bruins. In the first round of the 2014 playoffs, the Sharks were matched with rivals and eventual Stanley Cup champion Los Angeles Kings. Although the Sharks took a 3–0 series lead, the Kings came back to tie the series before advancing with a 5–1 win in game seven (only the fourth time in NHL history where a team lost a best-of-seven series after winning their first three games).

On August 20, 2014, head coach Todd McLellan announced the team would go into training camp for the 2014–15 season without a captain, and that all players would have the opportunity to compete for the captaincy. The Sharks hosted the 2015 Stadium Series against the Kings at Levi's Stadium in February 2015, losing 2–1. The team missed the playoffs for the first time in ten years. On April 20, 2015, the team announced that they had agreed to part ways with McLellan.

==== First Stanley Cup Final and continued contention (2015–2019) ====
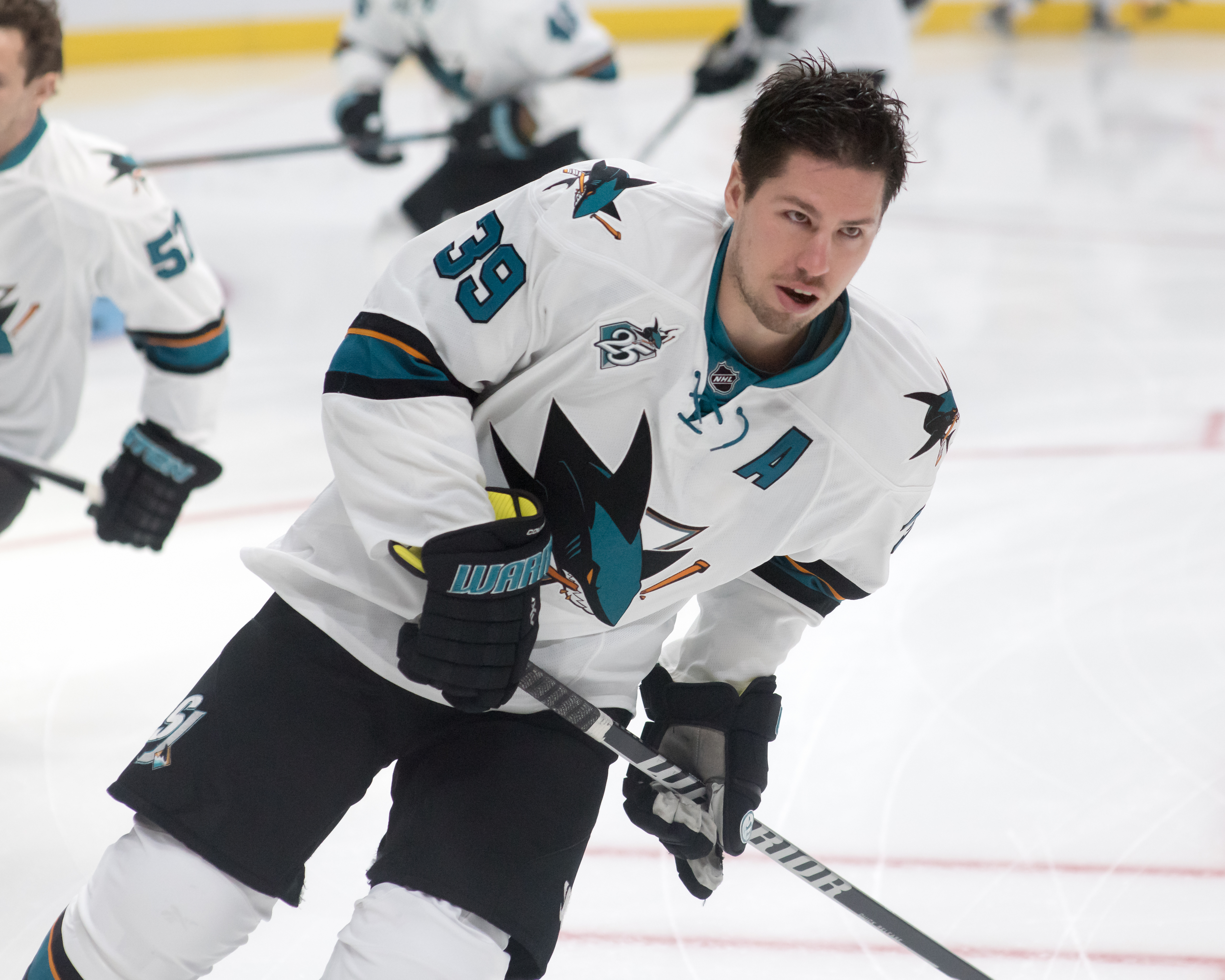
Logan Couture led the Sharks in scoring during their run to the 2016 Stanley Cup Final.

On May 28, 2015, the team named Peter DeBoer as their head coach. During the offseason, they traded goalie Antti Niemi to the Dallas Stars for a seventh-round draft pick in the 2015 NHL entry draft. They also acquired forward Joel Ward and goaltender Martin Jones, the latter of which was flipped from the Boston Bruins via the Los Angeles Kings. They also named forward Joe Pavelski the team's captain. The Sharks finished third in the Pacific Division with 98 points. They defeated the Los Angeles Kings in five games, the Nashville Predators in seven games, and the St. Louis Blues in six games to win the Western Conference championship. This marked the first time in franchise history that the Sharks advanced to the Stanley Cup Final. The Sharks ultimately lost the Stanley Cup Final in the best-of-seven series against the Pittsburgh Penguins in six games.

In the following season, the Sharks finished in third place in the Pacific Division, but were defeated by the Edmonton Oilers in six games in the first round of the 2017 playoffs. Following the season, Patrick Marleau left the team to sign with the Toronto Maple Leafs. In the 2017–18 season, the Sharks acquired Evander Kane in a trade with the Buffalo Sabres. The Sharks once again finished in third place in the Pacific Division. They swept the Anaheim Ducks in the first round of the 2018 playoffs, but lost to the expansion Vegas Golden Knights in six games in the second round.

Prior to the 2018–19 season, the Sharks traded Mikkel Bødker, Julius Bergman, and a draft pick to the Ottawa Senators for Mike Hoffman, Cody Donaghey, and a draft pick, but immediately flipped Hoffman to the Florida Panthers for three draft picks. Later that summer, the Sharks acquired Erik Karlsson and Francis Perron from the Senators for Rūdolfs Balcers, Dylan DeMelo, Josh Norris, Chris Tierney, and two draft picks. The Sharks saw another playoff berth and overcame a 3–1 series deficit over the Vegas Golden Knights. Game seven of the series featured a dramatic comeback over the Golden Knights; the Sharks scored four goals on a controversial five-minute power play with eight minutes remaining in the game, then Barclay Goodrow scored the overtime goal. The Sharks would go on to defeat the Colorado Avalanche in the second round before falling to the eventual Stanley Cup champion St. Louis Blues in six games. Captain Joe Pavelski left the team in free agency following the season.

==== Missing the playoffs (2019–2022) ====
On October 8, 2019, after two seasons in Toronto, Patrick Marleau was re-acquired by the Sharks. During the 2019–20 season, with the Sharks at 15–16–2 and failing to win a game during their five-game road stretch, DeBoer and his staff were fired. After DeBoer's firing, assistant coach Bob Boughner was named interim head coach. In March 2020, four months after Boughner became interim coach, the league was forced to suspend operations as a result of the COVID-19 pandemic. When the 2019–20 season resumed in August with the playoffs, the Sharks were not included, finishing in last place in both the Pacific Division and Western Conference. Boughner's interim label was removed on September 22, 2020.

Due to the COVID-19 pandemic, the divisions for the 2020–21 season were realigned. The Sharks played in the West Division. The Sharks missed the playoffs for the second consecutive year. In the 2021 NHL entry draft, the Sharks selected top-ranked European skater William Eklund seventh overall.

In the 2021–22 season, general manager Doug Wilson took medical leave on November 26, 2021, and resigned while away from the team on April 7, 2022. Assistant general manager Joe Will was elevated to interim general manager while the team sought a full-time candidate for the role. Evander Kane, who had violated the AHL COVID-19 protocol, was placed on unconditional waivers for purposes of terminating his contract. After clearing waivers, he was signed by the Edmonton Oilers, but still had a grievance filed against the Sharks which was settled later that year. The team missed the playoffs for the third straight season, and head coach Bob Boughner and other members of the coaching staff were relieved of duties in the summer in advance of the Sharks naming a new general manager.

=== Mike Grier era (2022–present) ===
==== Rebuilding (2022–present) ====
Macklin Celebrini was named the youngest Sharks' team captain in the 2026–27 season.

On July 5, 2022, the Sharks hired former player Mike Grier to serve as their new general manager, becoming the first black general manager in NHL history and fifth general manager in franchise history. On July 13, the Sharks traded defenseman Brent Burns along with a prospect to the Carolina Hurricanes for Steven Lorentz and a draft pick. On July 26, Grier named former Rangers head coach David Quinn as the team's new head coach. San Jose opened its season in Europe as part of the 2022 NHL Global Series, with an exhibition match against Eisbären Berlin and a two-game series against Nashville in Prague, Czech Republic to kick off the 2022–23 regular season. On February 25, 2023, the Sharks retired Patrick Marleau's number 12 in a pre-game ceremony. Marleau's number was the first to be retired in franchise history. Prior to the trade deadline, the Sharks and New Jersey Devils executed an 11-piece trade on February 26, in which the Sharks sent forward Timo Meier to New Jersey in exchange for multiple future assets, including two conditional first-round draft selections, 2020 first-round pick Shakir Mukhamadullin and winger Fabian Zetterlund. The Sharks finished in seventh place in the Pacific Division, and missed the playoffs for the fourth straight season. The Sharks were led in scoring by defenseman Erik Karlsson, who finished with 101 points and 67 assists, both of which are records by a Sharks defenseman. He scored a pair of goals on April 10, in Winnipeg to become the sixth defenseman in NHL history to record 100 points and first since Brian Leetch in 1991–92. His goal, assist and point totals at the end of the season led all NHL defensemen, and he was named to his seventh NHL All-Star game. He was awarded the Norris Trophy on June 26, the third of his career and second won by a Sharks defenseman.

On August 6, San Jose traded Karlsson to the Pittsburgh Penguins as part of a three-team trade also featuring the Montreal Canadiens. San Jose received a conditional first-round selection from Pittsburgh in the 2024 NHL entry draft, along with forwards Mikael Granlund and Mike Hoffman and defenseman Jan Rutta. During the 2023–24 season, the Sharks became the first team since the 1965–66 Boston Bruins to allow 10 goals in consecutive games. Their 0–10–1 record tied the record for longest losing streak to start the season. They traded Tomáš Hertl at the trade deadline, receiving David Edstrom and a 2025 first round pick in return. After the 2023–24 season, head coach David Quinn was fired.

On May 7, 2024, the Sharks won the NHL draft lottery for the first time, securing the number one pick for the 2024 NHL entry draft, picking Macklin Celebrini from Boston University. Assistant coach Ryan Warsofsky was announced as Quinn's replacement as head coach on June 13, 2024. The Sharks finished the 2024–25 season last but fell to picking second overall in the 2025 NHL entry draft, with which they selected Michael Misa. Following the season, captain Logan Couture retired, spending his entire NHL career with the Sharks.

At the start of the 2025–26 season, amidst the team losing their first five games of the season, Warsofsky said "I'd give up one of my children for a f-----g win." He later apologized for the comments. On April 16, Macklin Celebrini surpassed Joe Thornton's single-season point record of 114 by a single point, making 115 points the new all-time season total. Celebrini was named team captain prior to the 2026–27 season.

== Team information ==
=== Logo and jerseys ===
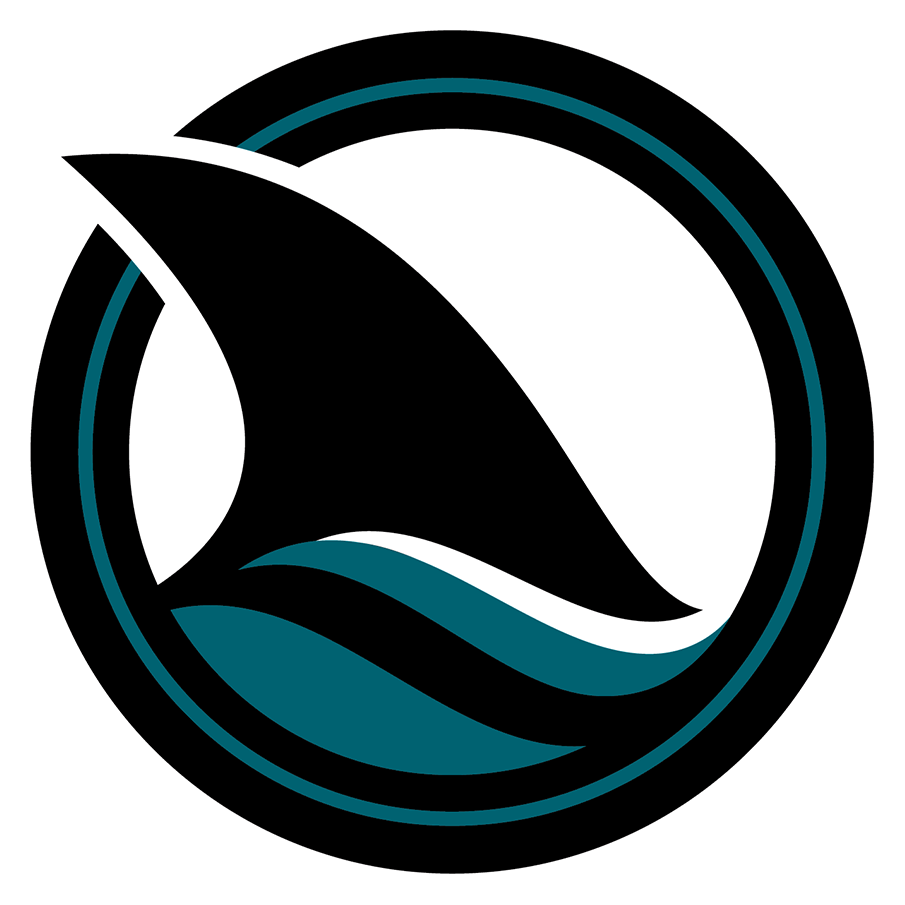
The alternate logo of the San Jose Sharks.

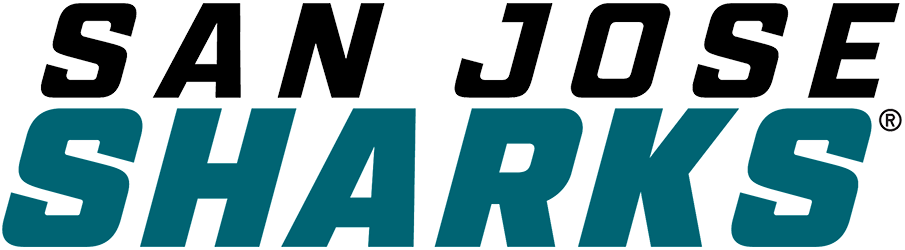
The current wordmark logo for the San Jose Sharks was introduced in the 2020–21 season.

The Sharks' logo of a shark chomping on a hockey stick has been in use since their inaugural 1991–92 season, with slight modifications prior to the 2007–08 season. The triangle on the logo references the Bay Area's Red Triangle near the Pacific Ocean. The Sharks also use various partial and alternate logos based on the primary logo.

The original Sharks' road jerseys were teal with white, gray and black striping and featured white block lettering with black trim. Home uniforms were white with teal, gray and black striping and featured teal block lettering with black trim. Both jerseys included the team's "fin" logo on either shoulder and were used until the 1997–98 season.

The Sharks introduced their future road (later home) jersey as an alternate during the 1997–98 season, featuring a darker teal base, wide gray sleeve and shoulder striping and modernized lettering. A white home (later road) counterpart was introduced the following season and featured teal and gray shoulder and sleeve stripes. In the 2001–02 season, the Sharks began wearing a black third jersey, featuring the return of the fin logo on the shoulders and minimalist teal and white sleeve stripes.

Upon switching to the Reebok Edge template in 2007, the Sharks introduced new home and away jerseys. The teal home jersey featured a black shoulder yoke while the white road jersey used a teal shoulder yoke. Both jerseys replaced gray with orange trim on the stripes and lettering, added numbers on the right chest, and featured the full-body (or "jumping") shark logo on the shoulders.

Before the 2008–09 season, the Sharks introduced a new black alternate jersey, without the contrasting shoulder yoke, tail stripes or orange trim. It also featured the jumping shark logo in front and the "SJ" alternate logo on the shoulders. Prior to the 2013–14 season, the Sharks unveiled new uniforms, which included less orange, along with adding a lace-up collar. The front numbers were replaced with the Sharks' 25th-anniversary logo prior to the 2015–16 season.

Following the switch to Adidas' AdiZero template in 2017, the Sharks kept much of their basic look save for the replacement of the "jumping shark" logo in favor of the "screaming shark" logo (home jersey) and "SJ" logo (road jersey) on the shoulder. The slogan "This Is Sharks Territory" was added inside the neckline. The black alternates were retired prior to the season, but in 2018, a new black jersey was introduced. Known as the "Stealth" jersey, it featured a slightly different rendition of the primary Sharks logo, an updated version of the original "fin" logo on the shoulders and stylized circuit board sleeve striping.

The Sharks participated in the 2015 Stadium Series by wearing a tricolor jersey of teal, white and black accented by the primary Sharks logo in front and a new "Northern California" alternate logo on the shoulders. The back of the jersey remained teal and featured larger lettering.

During the 2015–16 season, as part of their 25th anniversary, the Sharks wore a slightly modified version of their original teal jerseys for a few home games. These uniforms were brought back in 2021 for the Sharks' 30th anniversary, albeit modified to the AdiZero cut.

The Sharks wore Reverse Retro alternate uniforms for the 2020–21 season. The design used was similar to the teal uniforms they wore from 1997 to 2007, but with a gray base and black stripes.

The Sharks released new uniforms in 2022, featuring elements inspired from the team's original 1991–1998 uniform set. In addition, the Sharks changed their pants, gloves and home helmet to teal. The Sharks also unveiled a second "Reverse Retro" uniform based on the last uniforms worn by their Bay Area predecessors, the California Golden Seals. The design replaced the "Seals" wordmark with "Sharks" in teal and gold trim.

In the 2023–24 season, the Sharks unveiled a new "Cali Fin" black alternate uniform, featuring the updated fin logo as the main crest, along with a modified version of the "Northern California" shoulder patch adopted from the 2015 Stadium Series uniform. In addition to teal and white stripes, a teal yarn-dye-esque striping pattern adorned the sleeves, tail and socks.

For four games in the 2025–26 season, the Sharks wore 35th anniversary "Heritage" uniforms based on the teal uniforms they wore for 10 years from 1997 to 2007.

During the 2026–27 season, the Sharks wore "Hometown Remix" alternate uniforms featuring a lighter teal base with black and silver trim, incorporating the alternate "SJ" crest beside a full-bodied shark. Shark teeth patterns adorned the sleeves. The uniform paid tribute to the Shark Head entrance during pre-game warmups.

=== Broadcasters ===
Television:

- Randy Hahn: play-by-play
- Drew Remenda: primary color commentator
- Scott Hannan: alternate color commentator
- Jamal Mayers: alternate color commentator
- Alex Stalock: alternate color commentator
- Natalie Noury: studio host
- Jason Demers: lead studio analyst, alternate color commentator
- Mark Smith: alternate studio analyst
- Ted Ramey: alternate studio analyst
- Nick Nollenberger: studio analyst

Radio:

- Dan Rusanowsky: play-by-play
- Scott Hannan: color commentator for select games
- Drew Remenda: color commentator for select games
- Jason Demers: color commentator for select games
- Jamal Mayers: color commentator for select games
- Alex Stalock: color commentator for select games
- Ted Ramey: Sharks Audio Network host and color commentator for select games
- Tara Slone: Sharks Audio Network host

On June 1, 2023, Dan Rusanowsky was announced as the recipient of the 2023 Foster Hewitt Memorial Award, voted on by the NHL Broadcaster's Association and presented "in recognition of members of the radio and television industry who made outstanding contributions to their profession and the game during their career in hockey broadcasting".

== Traditions ==
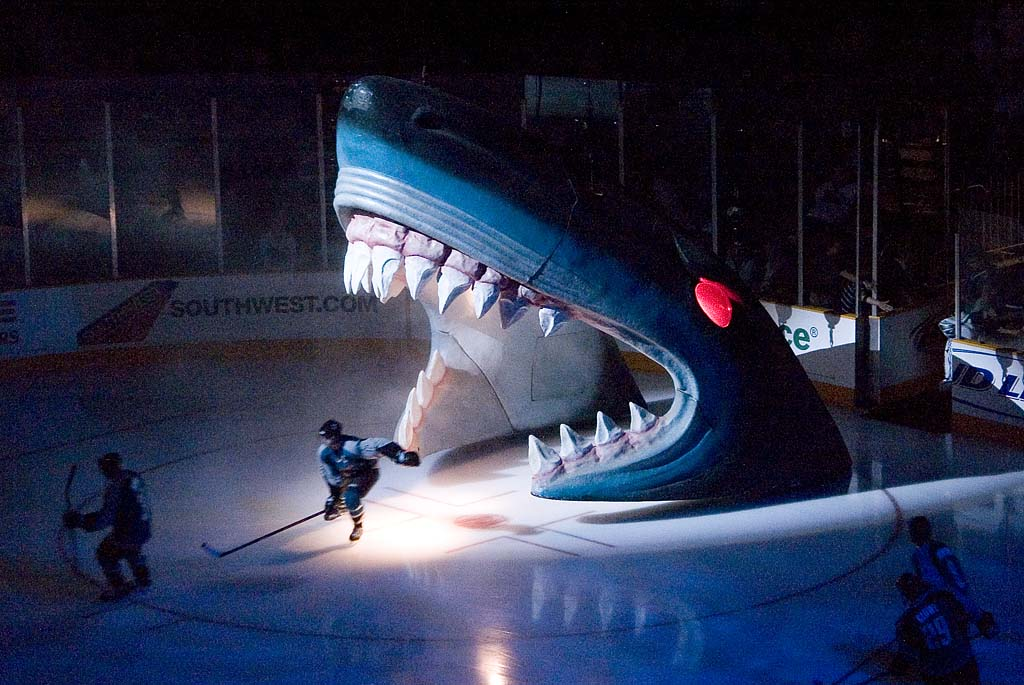
Sharks pre-game entrance through the Shark's mouth

The Sharks' best-known tradition is their pre-game entrance scene. At the beginning of each Sharks home game, the lights go down and a 17-foot open shark mouth is lowered from the rafters. As the mouth is lowered, the eyes flash red and fog pours out. Then, a live view of the locker room tunnel with Sharks players is shown on the scoreboard and the goalie leads the team out of the locker room, through the mouth, and onto the ice.

== Season-by-season record ==
This is a partial list of the last five seasons completed by the Sharks. For the full season-by-season history, see List of San Jose Sharks seasons

Note: GP = Games played, W = Wins, L = Losses, T = Ties, OTL = Overtime Losses, Pts = Points, GF = Goals for, GA = Goals against

Season	GP	W	L	OTL	Pts	GF	GA	Finish	Playoffs
2021–22	82	32	37	13	77	214	264	6th, Pacific	Did not qualify
2022–23	82	22	44	16	60	234	321	7th, Pacific	Did not qualify
2023–24	82	19	54	9	47	181	331	8th, Pacific	Did not qualify
2024–25	82	20	50	12	52	210	315	8th, Pacific	Did not qualify
2025–26	82	39	35	8	86	251	292	5th, Pacific	Did not qualify

== Players and personnel ==
=== Current roster ===
Updated November 6, 2026

No.	Nat	Player	Pos	S/G	Age	Acquired	Birthplace
5	(Canada)	Nolan Allan	D	L	23	2026	Davidson, Saskatchewan
30	(Russia)	Yaroslav Askarov	G	R	24	2024	Omsk, Russia
18	(Sweden)	Filip Bystedt	C	L	22	2024	Linköping, Sweden
71	(Canada)	Macklin Celebrini (C)	C	L	20	2024	North Vancouver, British Columbia
92	(Russia)	Igor Chernyshov	LW	R	20	2024	Penza, Russia
39	(Canada)	Logan Couture	C	L	37	2007	Guelph, Ontario
10	(Canada)	Ty Dellandrea	C	R	26	2024	Port Perry, Ontario
6	(Canada)	Sam Dickinson	D	L	20	2024	Toronto, Ontario
81	(United States)	Adam Gaudette	RW	R	30	2025	Braintree, Massachusetts
23	(Canada)	Barclay Goodrow (A)	C	L	33	2024	Toronto, Ontario
51	(United States)	Collin Graf	RW	R	24	2024	Lincoln, Massachusetts
7	(United States)	Michael Kesselring	D	R	26	2026	Florence, South Carolina
27	(Canada)	Mason Marchment	LW	L	31	2026	Uxbridge, Ontario
77	(Canada)	Michael Misa	C	L	19	2025	Oakville, Ontario
33	(United States)	Alex Nedeljkovic	G	L	30	2025	Parma, Ohio
25	(Canada)	Darnell Nurse (A)	D	L	31	2026	Hamilton, Ontario
9	(Russia)	Dmitry Orlov	D	L	35	2025	Novokuznetsk, Soviet Union
63	(Canada)	Zack Ostapchuk	C	L	23	2025	Edmonton, Alberta
48	(United States)	Eric Pohlkamp	D	R	22	2023	Baxter, Minnesota
44	(United States)	Kiefer Sherwood	LW	R	31	2026	Columbus, Ohio
2	(United States)	Will Smith	C	R	21	2023	Lexington, Massachusetts
41	(Sweden)	Ivar Stenberg	LW	R	19	2026	Gothenburg, Sweden
73	(Canada)	Tyler Toffoli (A)	C	R	34	2024	Scarborough, Ontario
65	(United States)	Jacob Trouba	D	R	32	2026	Rochester, Michigan
21	(Sweden)	Alexander Wennberg (A)	C	L	32	2024	Nacka, Sweden

=== Hall of Fame ===
The San Jose Sharks hold an affiliation with a number of inductees to the Hockey Hall of Fame, including nine inductees from the players category of the Hall of Fame.

Players

- Ed Belfour
- Rob Blake
- Igor Larionov
- Sergei Makarov
- Jeremy Roenick
- Teemu Selänne
- Joe Thornton
- Mike Vernon
- Doug Wilson

=== Retired numbers ===
San Jose Sharks retired numbers
No.	Player	Position	Career	Date of honor
12	Patrick Marleau	C/LW	1997–2017; 2019–2020; 2020–2021	February 25, 2023
19	Joe Thornton	C	2005–2020	November 23, 2024

The team is unable to issue No. 99 to its players due to the NHL retiring the league-wide number in honor of Wayne Gretzky at the 2000 NHL All-Star Game.

In 2015, the team raised a GGIII in honor of George Gund III, the original team owner.

In 2022, the team raised a DW banner to honor the accomplishments of Doug Wilson, who served as both a player and general manager for the team.

=== Team captains ===
- Doug Wilson, 1991–1993
- Bob Errey, 1993–1995
- Jeff Odgers, 1995–1996
- Todd Gill, 1996–1998
- Owen Nolan, 1998–2003
- Rotating for first half of 2003–04 season
  - Mike Ricci (first 10 games)
  - Vincent Damphousse (next 20 games)
  - Alyn McCauley (next 10 games)
- Patrick Marleau, 2004–2009
- Rob Blake, 2009–2010
- Joe Thornton, 2010–2014
- Joe Pavelski, 2015–2019
- Logan Couture, 2019–2025
- Macklin Celebrini, 2026–present

== NHL awards and trophies ==
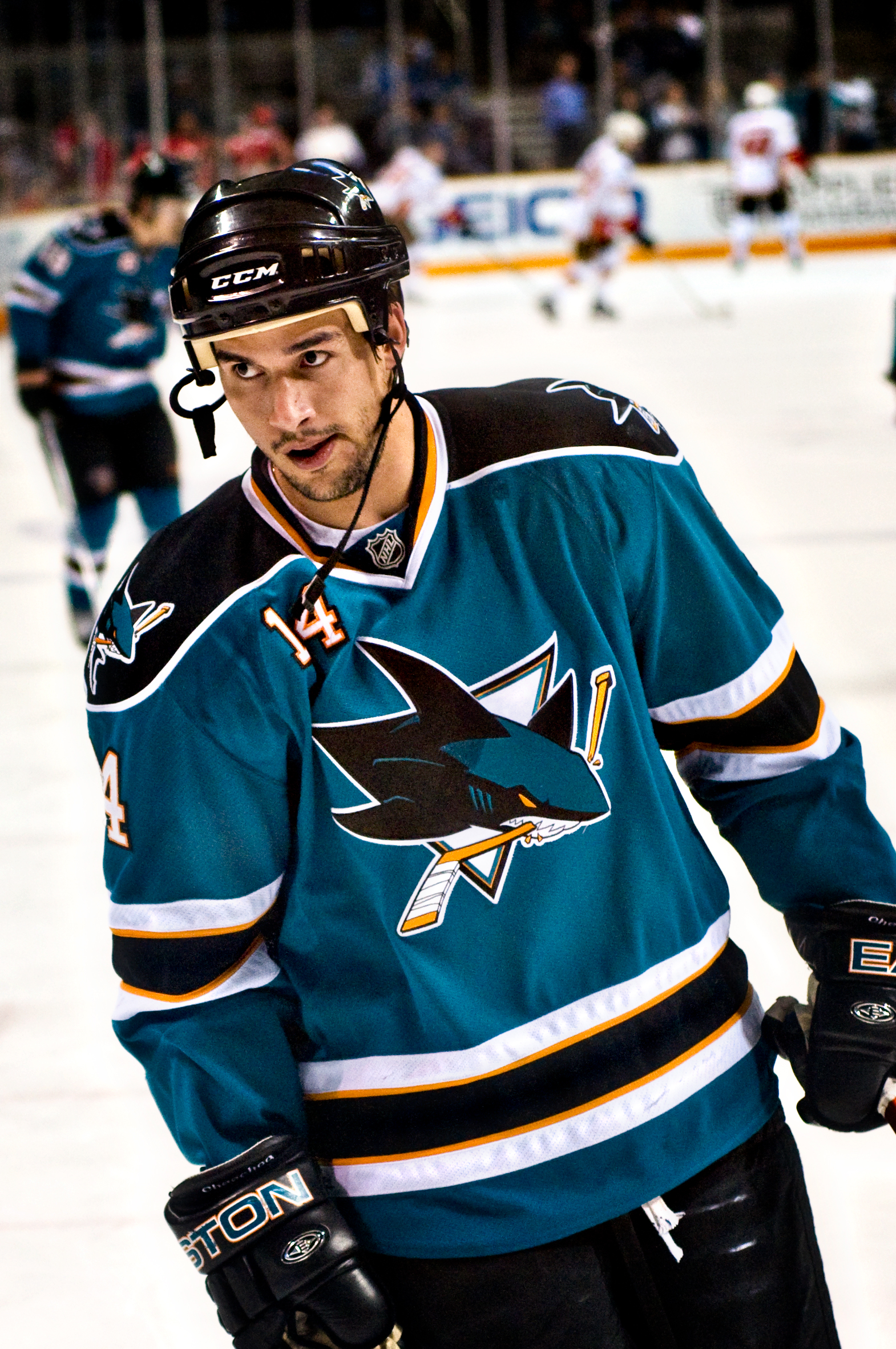
Jonathan Cheechoo was awarded the Maurice "Rocket" Richard Trophy after scoring 56 goals in the 2005–06 season.

Clarence S. Campbell Bowl

- 2015–16

Presidents' Trophy

- 2008–09

Art Ross Trophy

- Joe Thornton: 2005–06 (Note: Traded from the Boston Bruins during the 2005–06 season.)

Bill Masterton Memorial Trophy

- Tony Granato: 1996–97

Calder Memorial Trophy

- Evgeni Nabokov: 2000–01

Hart Memorial Trophy

- Joe Thornton: 2005–06

James Norris Memorial Trophy

- Brent Burns: 2016–17
- Erik Karlsson: 2022–23

Maurice "Rocket" Richard Trophy

- Jonathan Cheechoo: 2005–06

NHL Foundation Player Award

- Brent Burns: 2014–15

All-Star Game head coach

- Todd McLellan: 2009, 2012

== Franchise leaders ==
=== Scoring leaders ===
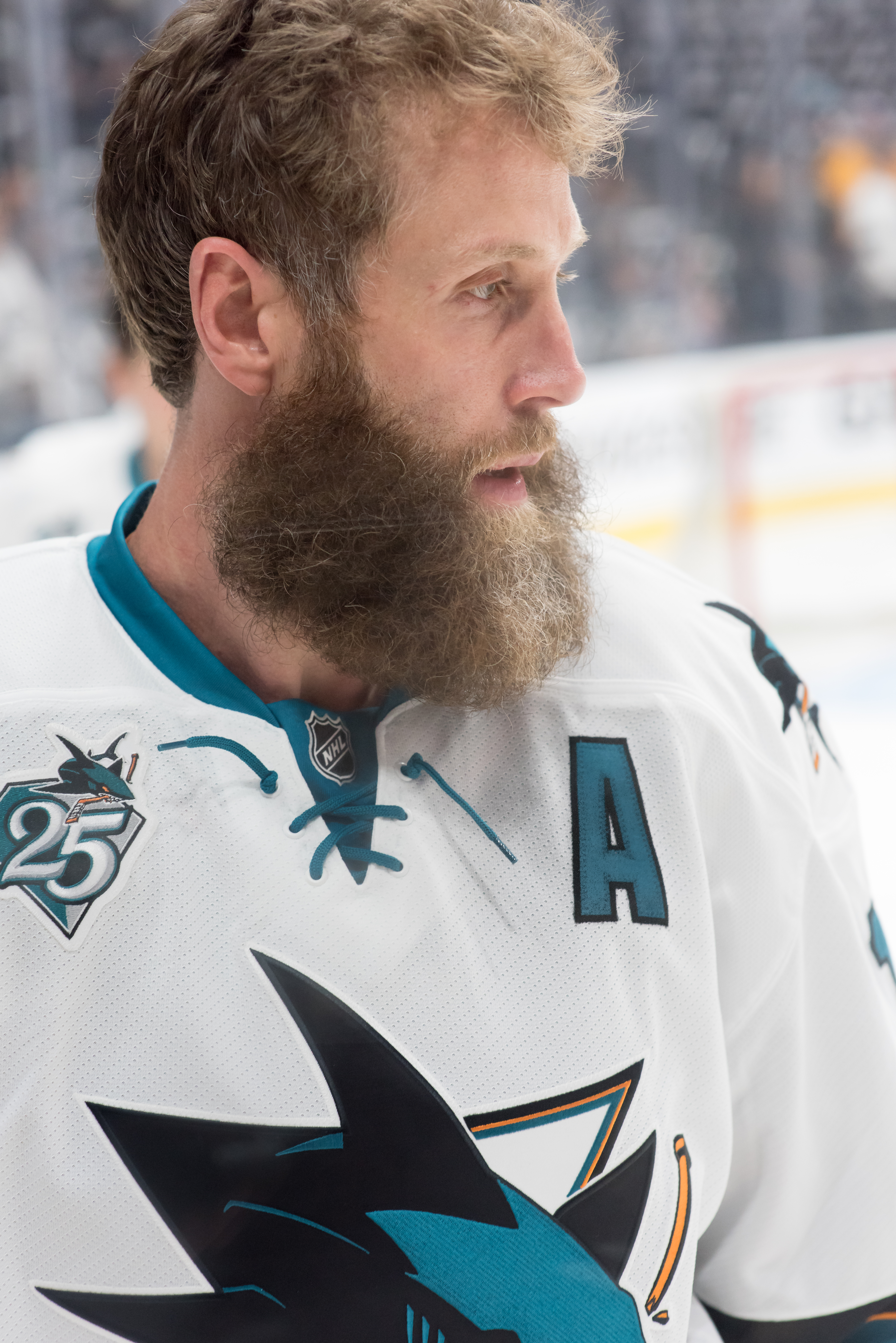
Recording 804 regular season assists as a Shark, Joe Thornton holds the all-time record for assists recorded with the team.

These are the top-ten-point-scorers in franchise regular season history. Figures are updated after each completed NHL regular season.

- * – current Sharks player

Note: Pos = Position; GP = Games Played; G = Goals; A = Assists; Pts = Points; P/G = Points per game

Points
Player	Pos	GP	G	A	Pts	P/G
Patrick Marleau	C	1,607	522	589	1,111	.69
Joe Thornton	C	1,104	251	804	1,055	.96
Joe Pavelski	C	963	355	406	761	.79
Logan Couture	C	933	323	378	701	.75
Brent Burns	D	798	172	422	594	.74
Tomáš Hertl	C	712	218	266	484	.68
Owen Nolan	RW	568	206	245	451	.79
Marc-Édouard Vlasic	D	1,323	84	295	379	.29
Jeff Friesen	LW	516	149	201	350	.68
Timo Meier	RW	451	154	162	316	.70

Goals
Player	Pos	G
Patrick Marleau	C	522
Joe Pavelski	C	355
Logan Couture	C	323
Joe Thornton	C	251
Tomáš Hertl	C	218
Owen Nolan	RW	206
Brent Burns	D	172
Jonathan Cheechoo	RW	165
Timo Meier	RW	154
Jeff Friesen	LW	149

Assists
Player	Pos	A
Joe Thornton	C	804
Patrick Marleau	C	589
Brent Burns	D	422
Joe Pavelski	C	406
Logan Couture	C	378
Marc-Édouard Vlasic	D	295
Tomáš Hertl	C	266
Owen Nolan	RW	245
Jeff Friesen	LW	201
Dan Boyle	D	201

=== Goaltending leaders ===
These are the top-ten goaltenders in franchise history by wins. Figures are updated after each completed NHL regular season.

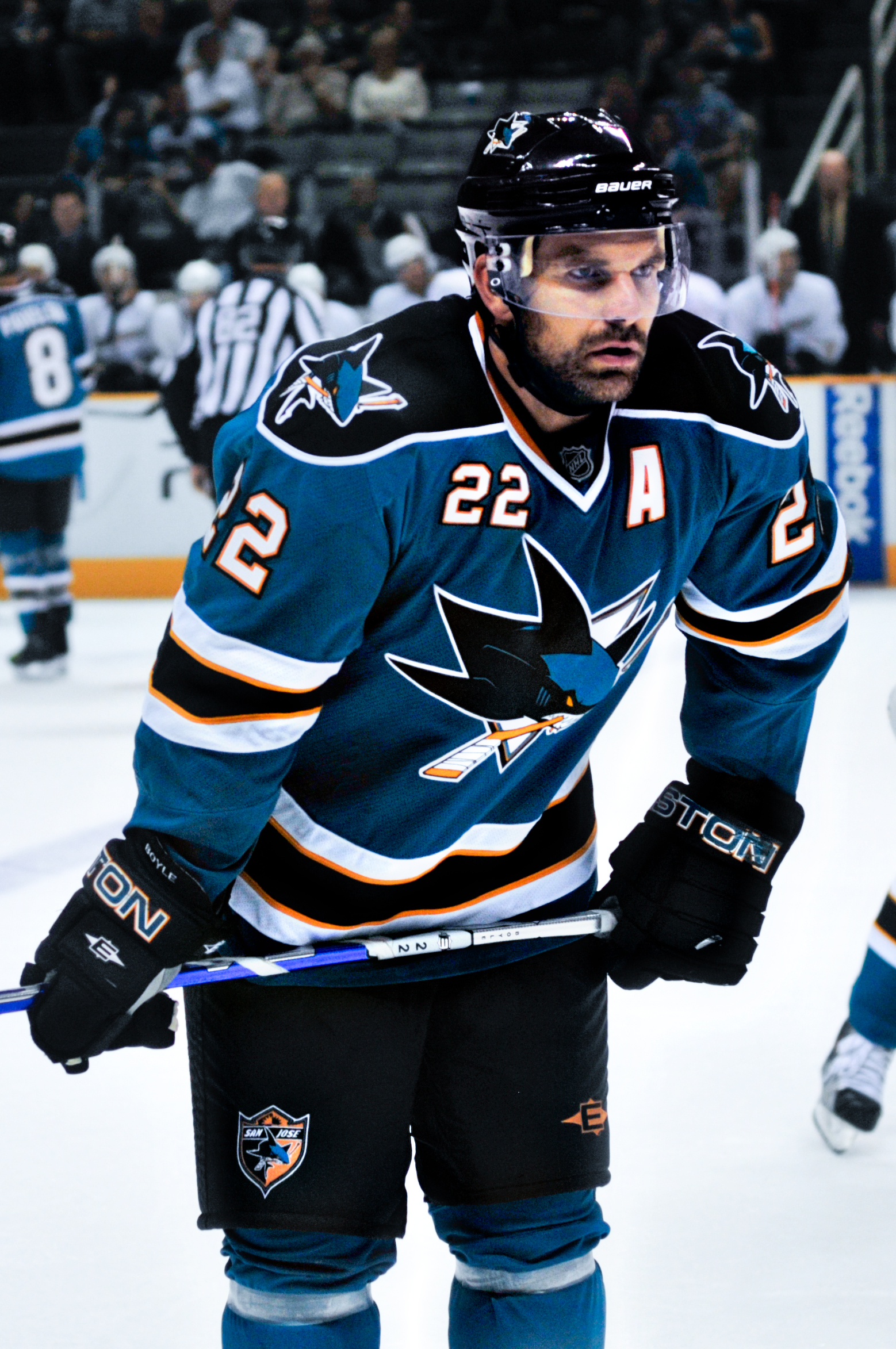
With 48 playoff points, Dan Boyle recorded the second-most playoff points by any Sharks defensemen.

- * – current Sharks player

Note: GP = Games played; W = Wins; L = Losses; T/O = Ties/Overtime losses; GA = Goal against; GAA = Goals against average; SA = Shots against; SV% = Save percentage; SO = Shutouts

Goaltenders
Player	GP	W	L	T/O	GA	GAA	SA	SV%	SO
Evgeni Nabokov	563	293	178	66	1,294	2.39	14,757	.912	50
Martin Jones	327	170	121	27	836	2.66	8,976	.907	18
Antti Niemi	296	163	92	35	696	2.40	8,342	.917	25
Vesa Toskala	115	65	28	10	245	2.35	2,842	.914	8
Artūrs Irbe	183	57	91	26	595	3.47	5,342	.889	8
Mike Vernon	126	52	49	19	285	2.39	2,961	.904	9
Aaron Dell	111	48	37	12	275	2.75	3,010	.909	5
Steve Shields	125	48	49	21	289	2.44	3,368	.914	10
James Reimer	99	37	40	18	289	3.05	2,993	.903	7
Yaroslav Askarov*	60	25	26	6	194	3.51	1,698	.886	0

== See also ==
- 1991 NHL dispersal and expansion drafts
- List of San Jose Sharks draft picks
