= Jack Ferreira =

American ice hockey executive

- Born: June 9, 1944 (age 82) Providence, Rhode Island, U.S.
- Height: 5 ft 8 in (173 cm)
- Weight: 155 lb (70 kg; 11 st 1 lb)
- Position: Goaltender
- Caught: Left
- Played for: Boston University
- NHL draft: Undrafted
- Playing career: 1963–1966

Jack Ferreira (born June 9, 1944) is an American former ice hockey executive who worked as a senior advisor to the general manager of the NHL's Minnesota Wild, a special assistant to the general manager of the Los Angeles Kings, a director of player personnel with the former Atlanta Thrashers, and as a General Manager of the Anaheim Ducks.

== Early life ==
Ferreira was born in Providence, Rhode Island. He played for the Boston University Terriers men's ice hockey team in the mid-1960s under head coach Jack Kelley and was part of the hall-of-Fame coach's first recruiting class at BU. Nicknamed "Mr. Magoo" by his teammates due to being legally blind, Ferreira's breakout year came as a junior in 1965, when the Terriers achieved a 25–6 record and won the ECAC regular season title. Though BU would fall to Brown in the conference semifinals, preventing the Terriers from making the 1965 tournament, Ferreira set a record for eight shutouts that still stands.

== Career ==
Ferreira worked as the New York Rangers' director of player development before signing a multiyear contract as the Minnesota North Stars' general manager and vice president in 1988. As part of the deal for George Gund III to sell the North Stars to a group led by Norman Green, the NHL awarded Gund a franchise in Northern California, to which he brought Ferreira along to become the general manager. Ferreira became the first general manager of the San Jose Sharks during their inaugural season in 1991–92. He later became the first general manager of another California franchise, the Mighty Ducks of Anaheim, from 1993 to 1998. After a season in which the Mighty Ducks failed to return to the playoffs, in 1998, Ferreira was demoted to vice president of hockey operations as Pierre Gauthier took over as GM. He left the organization in 2000 to become director of player personnel with the Atlanta Thrashers.

== Awards and honors ==
| Award | Year |
|---|---|
| All-ECAC Hockey First Team | 1964–65 |
| AHCA East All-American | 1964–65 |
| All-ECAC Hockey First Team | 1965–66 |
| Inducted into the RI Hockey Hall of Fame | 2020 |

Sporting positions
| Preceded by Lou Nanne | General Manager of the Minnesota North Stars; 1988–90 | Succeeded by Bob Clarke |
| Preceded by Position created | General Manager of the San Jose Sharks; 1991–92 | Succeeded by Chuck Grillo |
| Preceded by Position created | General Manager of the Mighty Ducks of Anaheim; 1993–98 | Succeeded by Pierre Gauthier |
