= Doug Wilson (ice hockey) =

Canadian ice hockey player and executive (born 1957)

- Hockey Hall of Fame, 2020
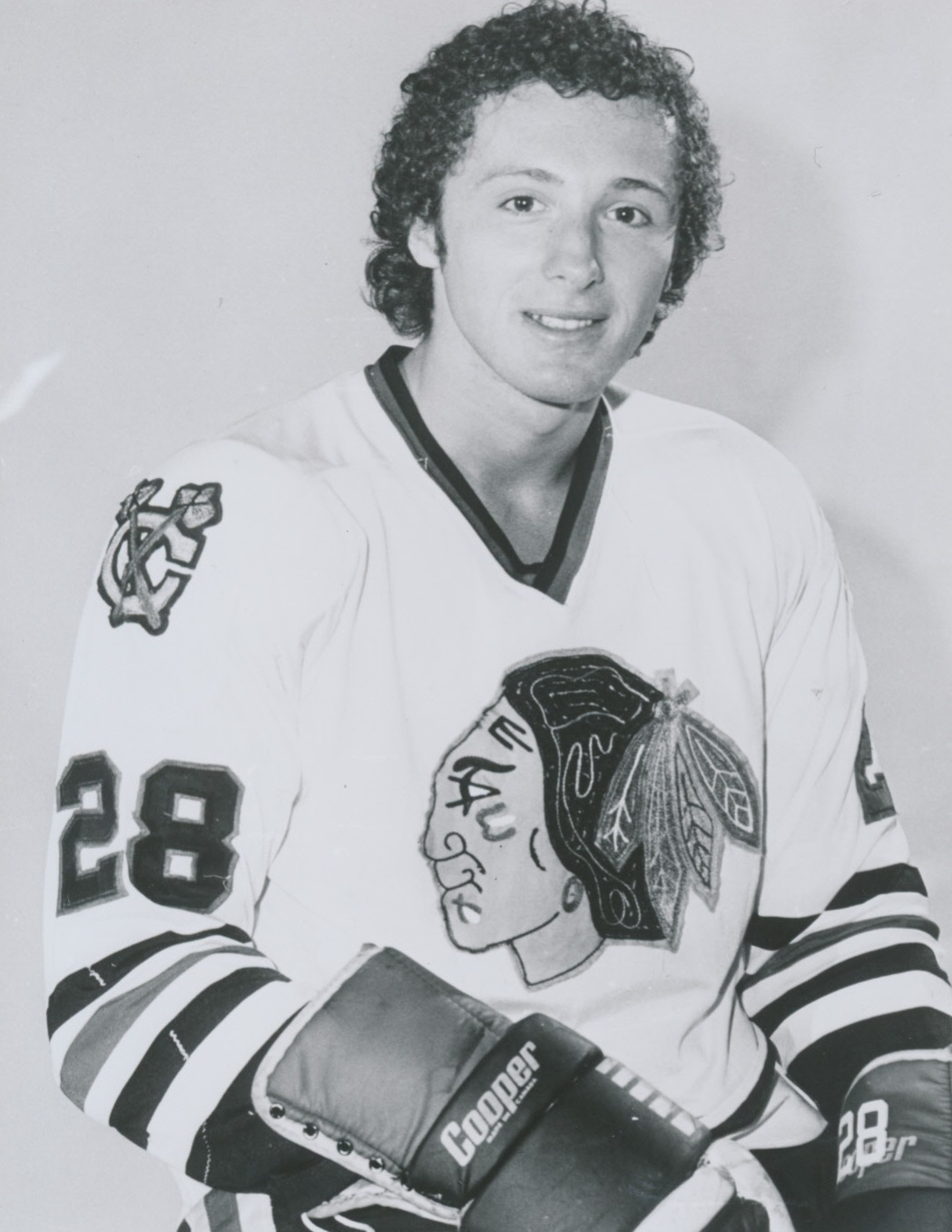
- Wilson with the Chicago Black Hawks in 1977
- Born: July 5, 1957 (age 69) Ottawa, Ontario, Canada
- Height: 6 ft 1 in (185 cm)
- Weight: 190 lb (86 kg; 13 st 8 lb)
- Position: Defence
- Shot: Left
- Played for: Chicago Blackhawks; San Jose Sharks
- National team: Canada
- NHL draft: 6th overall, 1977; Chicago Black Hawks
- WHA draft: 5th overall, 1977; Indianapolis Racers
- Playing career: 1977–1993

Douglas Frederick Wilson (born July 5, 1957) is a Canadian former professional ice hockey defenceman, who later served as general manager of the San Jose Sharks of the National Hockey League, and is currently senior advisor of hockey operations with the Pittsburgh Penguins. He won the 1984 Canada Cup with Team Canada.

== Early career ==
Wilson was born in Ottawa. He joined the hometown Ottawa 67's of the Ontario Major Junior Hockey League for the 1974-75 season as a defenceman. He scored 29 goals and 58 assists for a total of 87 points in 55 games while scoring five points in seven games of the playoffs. He played three seasons of junior hockey with the team, ranking in the top five on the team for scoring each time; in 156 total games, he had 254 points with 80 goals. In the 1976-77 season, the 67's won the J. Ross Robertson Cup as league champions while Wilson was named to the First All-Star team. In the Memorial Cup, they lost to the New Westminster Bruins 6-5 in the championship game; Wilson had 12 points in the tournament, leading all scorers.

== Playing career ==
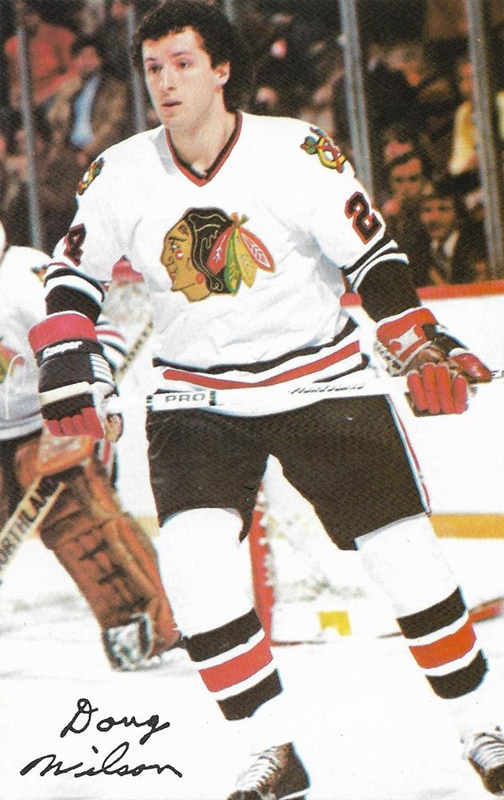
Wilson with the Black Hawks c. 1981

Wilson was drafted in the first round as the sixth overall pick in the 1977 NHL entry draft. He then played 14 seasons with the Chicago Black Hawks and two years for the San Jose Sharks in the National Hockey League. He was the first captain in Sharks history, serving two years before retiring after the 1992–93 season.

Wilson played 14 seasons in Chicago and still ranks as the club's highest-scoring defenceman in points (779 — seventh overall), goals (225 — 12th overall) and assists (554 — fourth overall). Wilson is ninth all-time in games played (938) for Chicago. He also led all Blackhawks defencemen in scoring for 10 consecutive seasons (1980–81 through 1990–91). In 1982, he was awarded the James Norris Memorial Trophy, as the League's top defenceman. That year, he had 39 goals and 85 points, which are still the Blackhawks single-season records for goals and points by a defenceman.

He was named to the roster for the 1984 Canada Cup for team Canada, which won the final. He was unable to make the roster for the 1987 Canada Cup due to a lingering knee injury.

He was selected to eight NHL All-Star Games (seven with Chicago and one with San Jose). While with Chicago, Wilson was named as an NHL First Team All-Star in 1982 and twice was named as an NHL Second Team All-Star (1985 and 1990).

Wilson agreed to waive his no-trade clause and was acquired by San Jose from Chicago just before the Sharks first season (1991–92) for prospect Kerry Toporowski and San Jose's 2nd round choice in the 1992 NHL draft. Wilson brought instant credibility and respect to the young franchise. He played two seasons for the Sharks, scoring 48 points (12 goals, 36 assists) in 86 games.

Other career highlights include serving as the franchise's first team captain (1991–93), being the team's first representative in an All-Star Game (1991–92), playing in his NHL-milestone 1,000th game on November 21, 1992 and twice was named Sharks nominee (1992 and 1993) for the King Clancy Memorial Trophy (for leadership and humanitarian contributions both on-and off-the-ice). At his 1,000th NHL game-played ceremony, he announced the team had created a scholarship in his name.

Wilson announced his retirement as a member of the Sharks during training camp in 1993–94 after playing in 1,024 career games. In addition, he played in 95 career playoff games and scored 80 points (19 goals, 61 assists). The Ottawa native scored 827 points (237 goals, 590 assists) during his career that began in 1977–78 with Chicago. In the timespan of his career from 1977 to 1993, his 827 points as a defenseman was the fourth most for his position and 8th most all-time when he retired.

Wilson was elected to the Hockey Hall of Fame on June 24, 2020, in his 24th year of eligibility. Before that, he had been one of two eligible Norris Trophy winners (along with Randy Carlyle) outside of the Hall of Fame.

== Career achievements ==
- Hockey Hall of Fame (2020)
- James Norris Memorial Trophy winner as best defenceman in NHL (1982), finalist in 1990
- King Clancy Memorial Trophy finalist (1992, 1993)
- NHL First All-Star Team – 1982
- NHL Second All-Star Team – 1985, 1990
- NHL All-Star Game – 1982, 1983, 1984, 1985, 1986, 1990, 1992
- Rendez-vous '87 selection
- Member of gold medal-winning Team Canada at Canada Cup (1984)
- Chicago Blackhawks leader in career goals and points by a defenceman
- Led all Chicago Blackhawks defencemen in scoring for 10 consecutive seasons
- First captain in San Jose Sharks team history

== Retirement and executive career ==
In 2004, Wilson was named to the Positive Coaching Alliance's National Advisory Board. PCA, established at Stanford University in 1998, tries to create a positive character-building experience by using sports to teach life lessons. The "win-at-all-costs" mentality is de-emphasized in PCA.

Wilson was inducted into the Chicago Sports Hall of Fame in September 1999. He also serves on the NHL's board of directors for the alumni association. In 2016, he was inducted into the San Jose Sports Hall of Fame.

In October 1998, the Ottawa 67s honored his career by retiring his No. 7 sweater. Known as an offensive defenceman, he recorded 295 points in 194 OHL games with the 67s from 1975 to 1977. In addition, during the same weekend of activities in his hometown, he was inducted into the Ottawa Sports Hall of Fame.

The San Jose Sharks hired Wilson as general manager on May 13, 2003, replacing Dean Lombardi, who had been dismissed on March 18. As general manager, Wilson was credited with building the Sharks into a perennially competitive team, reaching their first Stanley Cup Final in 2016. On January 26, 2017, he became the fourth person to serve as an NHL general manager for 1,000 games and appear in 1,000 games as an NHL player (joining Bobby Clarke, Bob Gainey, and Bob Pulford).

On April 7, 2022, Wilson stepped down from the position permanently to focus on his health, having been on medical leave since November 26, 2021, following two months of a non-COVID-19 related persistent cough; assistant general manager Joe Will filled in for the remainder of the season. On July 5, 2022, still dealing with his undisclosed illness, Wilson retired, with former San Jose Shark Mike Grier replacing him as general manager. In October 2022, the Sharks raised a "DW" banner honoring Wilson's contributions to the franchise.

He spent a further year away from hockey before resuming his career in the NHL with the Pittsburgh Penguins on September 6, 2023 as senior advisor of hockey operations. He serves as a counselor and mentor to all levels of the Penguins hockey operations department.

== Personal life ==
Doug and his wife Kathy met while she was a Chicago Honey Bears Cheerleader. They have four children: Lacey, Doug, Charlie and Chelsea. His daughter Chelsea played volleyball for the University of Southern California. His son Doug played hockey in Australia for the Melbourne Ice before joining the front office of the Sharks. Doug, Jr. currently is on the hockey staff of the Seattle Kraken. His daughter Lacey was Miss Massachusetts USA in 2010.

His brother, Murray Wilson, won the Stanley Cup four times with the Montreal Canadiens.

== Career statistics ==
=== Regular season and playoffs ===
			Regular season					Playoffs
Season	Team	League	GP	G	A	Pts	PIM	GP	G	A	Pts	PIM
1974–75	Ottawa 67's	OMJHL	55	29	58	87	75	7	2	3	5	6
1975–76	Ottawa 67's	OMJHL	58	26	62	88	142	12	5	10	15	24
1976–77	Ottawa 67's	OMJHL	43	25	54	79	85	19	4	20	24	34
1976–77	Ottawa 67's	MC	—	—	—	—	—	5	2	10	12	8
1977–78	Chicago Black Hawks	NHL	77	14	20	34	72	4	0	0	0	0
1978–79	Chicago Black Hawks	NHL	56	5	21	26	37	—	—	—	—	—
1979–80	Chicago Black Hawks	NHL	73	12	49	61	70	7	2	8	10	6
1980–81	Chicago Black Hawks	NHL	76	12	39	51	80	3	0	3	3	2
1981–82	Chicago Black Hawks	NHL	76	39	46	85	54	15	3	10	13	32
1982–83	Chicago Black Hawks	NHL	74	18	51	69	58	13	4	11	15	12
1983–84	Chicago Black Hawks	NHL	66	13	45	58	64	5	0	3	3	2
1984–85	Chicago Black Hawks	NHL	78	22	54	76	44	12	3	10	13	12
1985–86	Chicago Black Hawks	NHL	79	17	47	64	80	3	1	1	2	2
1986–87	Chicago Blackhawks	NHL	69	16	32	48	36	4	0	0	0	0
1987–88	Chicago Blackhawks	NHL	27	8	24	32	28	—	—	—	—	—
1988–89	Chicago Blackhawks	NHL	66	15	47	62	69	4	1	2	3	0
1989–90	Chicago Blackhawks	NHL	70	23	50	73	40	20	3	12	15	18
1990–91	Chicago Blackhawks	NHL	51	11	29	40	32	5	2	1	3	2
1991–92	San Jose Sharks	NHL	44	9	19	28	26	—	—	—	—	—
1992–93	San Jose Sharks	NHL	42	3	17	20	40	—	—	—	—	—
NHL totals			1,024	237	590	827	830	95	19	61	80	88

=== International ===
Year	Team	Event	GP	G	A	Pts	PIM
1984	Canada	CC	7	2	1	3	4

== See also ==
- List of NHL players with 1,000 games played

Awards
Preceded by Randy Carlyle	Winner of the Norris Trophy; 1982	Succeeded by Rod Langway
Sporting positions
Preceded by Real Cloutier	Chicago Black Hawks first-round draft pick 1977	Succeeded by Tim Higgins
Preceded by Bobby Simpson	Indianapolis Racers first round draft pick 1977	Succeeded by None
Preceded by Position created	San Jose Sharks captain 1991–1993	Succeeded by Bob Errey
Preceded by Bryan Trottier	NHLPA President; November 9, 1992 – September 13, 1993	Succeeded by Mike Gartner
Preceded by Dean Lombardi	General manager of the San Jose Sharks; 2003–2022	Succeeded by Joe Will (interim)
