= Jonathan Cheechoo =

Canadian ice hockey player (born 1980)

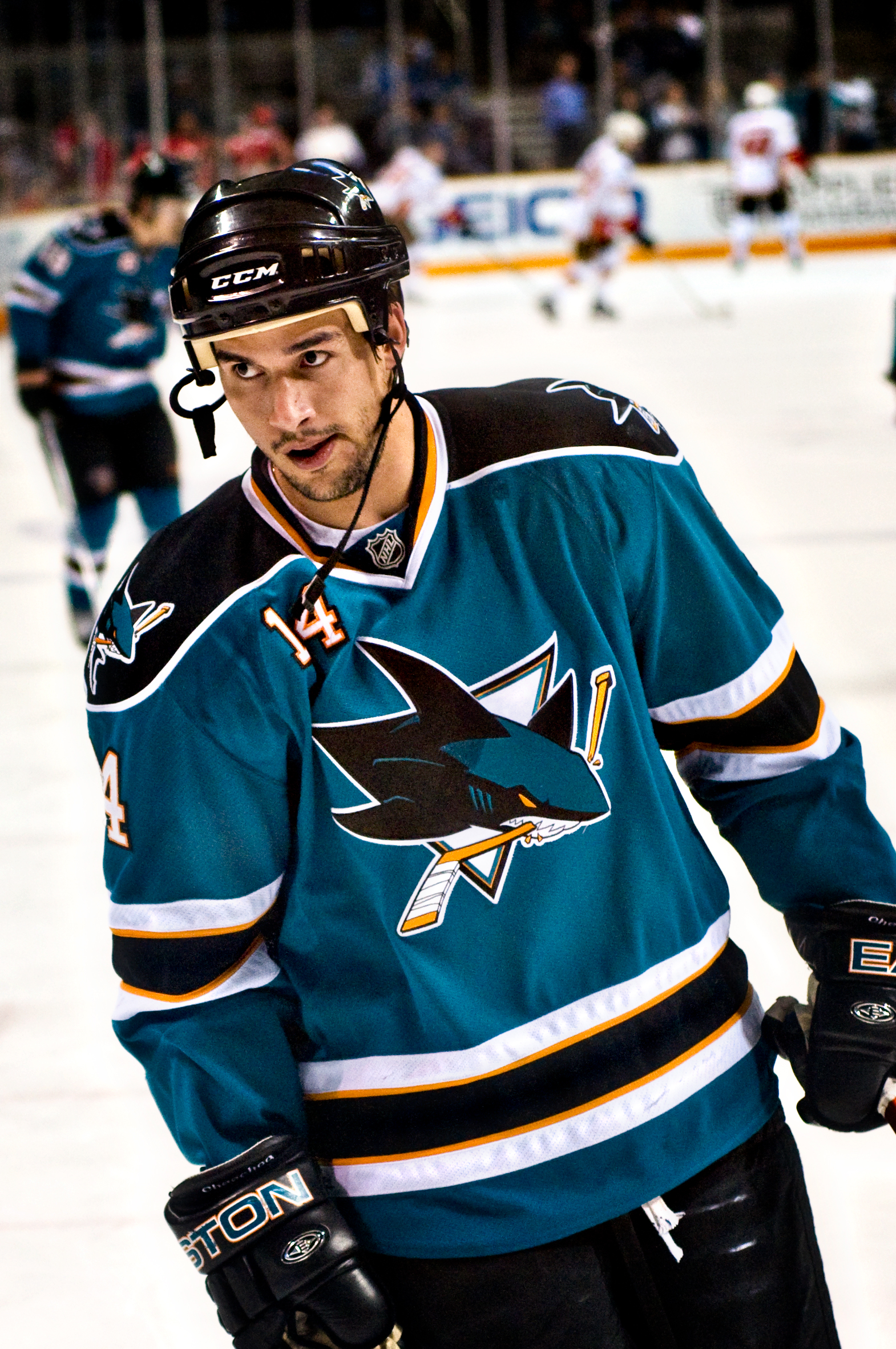
- Cheechoo with the San Jose Sharks in 2009
- Born: July 15, 1980 (age 46) Moose Factory, Ontario, Canada
- Height: 6 ft 1 in (185 cm)
- Weight: 220 lb (100 kg; 15 st 10 lb)
- Position: Right wing
- Shot: Right
- Played for: San Jose Sharks; Cleveland Barons; Ottawa Senators; Medveščak Zagreb; Dinamo Minsk; Slovan Bratislava
- NHL draft: 29th overall, 1998; San Jose Sharks
- Playing career: 2002–2017

Jonathan Earl Cheechoo (/ˈtʃiːtʃuː/; Cree: ᔔᓇᕦᓐ ᒋᒍ; born July 15, 1980) is a Canadian former professional ice hockey right winger who played in the National Hockey League (NHL).

During the 2005–06 season, he led the NHL with 56 goals and won the Maurice "Rocket" Richard Trophy. He was the first San Jose Sharks player to win the "Rocket" Richard Trophy, awarded to the NHL player with the most goals in a season. He was a member of Moose Cree First Nation and grew up in Moose Factory, a remote community.

== Playing career ==
Drafted by the Belleville Bulls of the Ontario Hockey League (OHL) in the 1997 OHL priority selection, Cheechoo had a reasonably strong rookie year in 1997–98 with 76 points (31 goals and 45 assists) in 64 games, good for third place on his team. In the 1998 NHL entry draft, the San Jose Sharks traded the second overall pick (used to select David Legwand) to the Nashville Predators for the third overall pick (used to select Brad Stuart) and the 29th overall pick, which they used to select Cheechoo. Most had predicted that Cheechoo would be a later-round pick, and San Jose was criticized for picking a lackluster forward who "skated slower forwards than most players skated backwards" instead of the highly touted Legwand.

Cheechoo joined the Bulls for the 1998–99 season and finished with 82 points (35 goals and 47 assists) in 63 games. Taking off in the playoffs, Cheechoo scored 30 points (15 goals and 15 assists) in 21 games. Five of those goals were scored during game seven of the OHL Final against the London Knights, a game the Bulls would win 9–2 to secure their first OHL Championship. Although he was now eligible for American Hockey League (AHL) assignment, San Jose chose to leave him unsigned, knowing he still had room to improve in the OHL. In the following season, Cheechoo had his best year, tallying a team-high 91 points (45 goals and 46 assists) in 66 games. Cheechoo added 17 points (five goals and 12 assists) in 16 games during the playoffs. Notably, Cheechoo never played a full season while in juniors because of minor injuries he gained from his crash-and-bang style of play. Cheechoo joined San Jose's AHL affiliate, the Kentucky Thoroughblades in the 2000–01 season and retained hockey agent Thane Campbell.

=== San Jose Sharks ===
Cheechoo had a strong rookie season with Kentucky in the AHL, scoring 66 points in 75 games. After going scoreless in the playoffs (in which he was a healthy scratch for two games), Cheechoo rebounded with 46 points (21 goals and 25 assists) in 53 games (he missed games due to a leg injury).

In 2002–03, after scoring seven points (three goals and four assists) in nine games with the Cleveland Barons (the relocated Kentucky Thoroughblades franchise), Cheechoo was recalled to San Jose to help revitalize the struggling team. Playing mostly on the third and fourth lines, Cheechoo had a modest 16 points (nine goals and seven assists) in 66 games.

His hard work paid off, as Cheechoo had 47 points in 81 games in 2003–04. Playing alongside Mike Ricci and Scott Thornton, Cheechoo had two mentors who taught Cheechoo how to be defensively responsible. Before the Calgary Flames eliminated San Jose in the 2004 Stanley Cup playoffs, Cheechoo had 10 points in 17 games. During the NHL lock-out, Cheechoo played with HV71 of the Swedish Elitserien and scored five goals in 20 games.

In the 2005–06 season, Cheechoo's offensive statistics exploded, with him netting a franchise record 56 goals and 93 points. Much of Cheechoo's success was augmented by the Sharks acquisition of his new linemate, superstar center Joe Thornton in late November. Before the trade, Cheechoo had 15 points (seven goals and eight assists) in 24 games. In the 57 games after the trade, Cheechoo had 78 points (49 goals and 29 assists). Due to his uptick in goal scoring, Cheechoo became the first Sharks player to win the Maurice "Rocket" Richard Trophy and the second aboriginal player (after Reggie Leach) to score more than 50 goals in a season. Thornton would go on to win the Hart Trophy (league MVP) that season.

In 2006, Cheechoo signed a five-year contract extension worth US$15 million, paying him US$2.5 million the first two years, US$3 million the third year and US$3.5 million the last two years.

In the 2006–07 season, Cheechoo got off to a slow start as he, Joe Thornton and newly acquired power forward Mark Bell failed to click. However, after a struggling Bell was demoted to the press box in favour of young speedster Milan Michalek, Cheechoo picked it up, finishing the season with 37 goals and 69 points in 76 games. During the 2007 off-season, Cheechoo required double hernia surgery to repair injuries he suffered during the Sharks' playoff run.

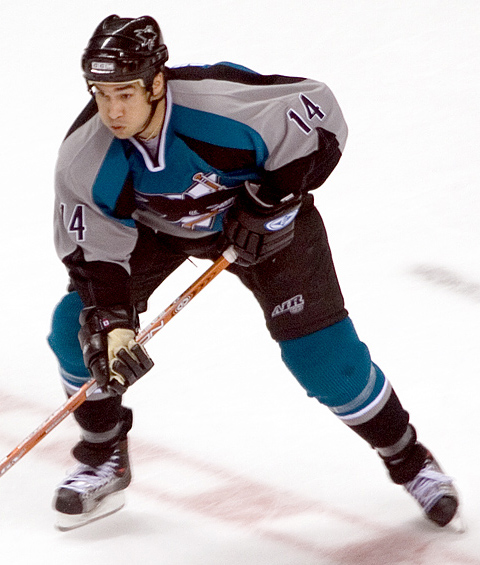
Cheechoo during the 2005–06 season. He scored a Sharks team record 56 goals that season.

During the 2007–08 season, Cheechoo's production dropped to 23 goals. Cheechoo's production dropped further the following season, where he scored just 12 goals.

=== Ottawa Senators ===
On September 12, 2009, Cheechoo was traded by the Sharks (along with Michalek and a second-round draft pick) to the Ottawa Senators in exchange for Dany Heatley and a fifth-round pick. On February 12, 2010, Cheechoo was placed on waivers by the Senators after they acquired Matt Cullen from the Carolina Hurricanes.

On February 13, 2010, he cleared waivers and was reassigned to the Binghamton Senators, Ottawa's AHL affiliate. He was recalled in the playoffs and played one game against the Pittsburgh Penguins. On June 28, he was again placed on waivers by the Senators. Cheechoo, who was heading into the final year of a five-year contract signed with San Jose in 2006, was reportedly owed $3.5 million for the 2010–11 season. On June 29, the Senators bought out the final year of his contract, making him a free agent.

=== Later career ===
Following his buy out, Cheechoo was invited to the Dallas Stars training camp on September 4, 2010. He was released from the tryout 22 days later, on September 26, following his appearance in two pre-season games where he failed to register a point and posted a −2 rating. Despite his efforts, Dallas felt Cheechoo could not out perform their current players and therefore released him so he would have the opportunity to join another team.

On October 5, 2010, Cheechoo returned to the Sharks organization, signing a professional try-out contract with their AHL affiliate, the Worcester Sharks, to re-unite with his first professional head coach Roy Sommer, who previously coached him with the Kentucky Thoroughblades.

On July 12, 2011, Cheechoo was signed by the St. Louis Blues to a one-year, two-way contract. While playing with the Blues' AHL affiliate, the Peoria Rivermen, Cheechoo earned his 500th career professional point on November 27 against the Chicago Wolves.

A free agent upon the 2012–13 NHL lockout, Cheechoo was belatedly signed to a professional try-out contract with the Oklahoma City Barons of the AHL during the midpoint of the 2012–13 season on January 20, 2013.

On July 10, 2013, Cheechoo left North America and signed a one-year contract with Croatian club, Medveščak Zagreb of the Kontinental Hockey League (KHL).

In May 2014, Cheechoo signed a two-year deal with KHL club Dinamo Minsk from Belarus. In 2016, he signed a one-year deal with Slovan Bratislava. Cheechoo was selected for the 2017 KHL All-Star game.

=== Retirement ===
On March 6, 2018, Cheechoo officially announced his retirement. He was recognized at the SAP Center in San Jose prior to the Sharks' game against the Calgary Flames on March 24, 2018. After Cheechoo announced his retirement, Sharks general manager Doug Wilson commented about Cheechoo's background; Wilson talked about the fact that he was a player who was able to have great success from a remote area of Canada.

== Personal life ==
Cheechoo is a member of the Cree First Nations tribe from Moose Factory, Ontario. When he was young, Cheechoo did not believe he would play in the NHL; instead, he believed that he would follow in the footsteps of his grandfather and would become a trapper and hunter for the Cree. Over time, Cheechoo developed into a strong hockey player and, at age 14, left his home after being told he would need to in order to develop his hockey skills. Cheechoo moved to Timmins, Ontario, around 300 kilometres (190 miles) away from his home, to play bantam hockey. Living so far from home, Cheechoo was homesick and found it very difficult to have to leave his close family at such a young age. Cheechoo has said he had a very strong support system when he was deciding to pursue ice hockey. His success was a highlight for Moose Factory, as shown by the 120 individuals who left Moose Factory to support him when he went 29th overall in the 1998 NHL Entry Draft.

Growing up in a small town, Cheechoo enjoyed the tight-knit nature of the town and expressed thanks for the high level of support he had from the people he grew up with. Cheechoo's childhood was very reminiscent of a traditional Cree upbringing and he has said his favourite things to do when he was young were to hunt and fish with his grandfather, George Cheechoo.

In his youth, Cheechoo was involved in the Little Native Hockey League, a tournament which gives aboriginal youth an outlet to play hockey. During the 25th Little Native Hockey Tournament, Cheechoo sat as the captain of the team and won the tournament. Cheechoo has described his involvement with the organization as being a positive aspect of his hockey career. Cheechoo sat as the Honorary Chair during the 46th annual event which took place in March 2017.

Cheechoo has been known to go out of his way to talk to children and interact with those who admire him. Cheechoo is seen as a role model for aboriginal youth in hockey, with his involvement in the Little Native Hockey League being a source of inspiration for those currently competing in the tournament and wishing to achieve the same level of success.

== Records ==
- San Jose Sharks' franchise record for goals in a season (56) – 2005–06
- San Jose Sharks' franchise record for power-play goals in a season (24) – 2005–06 season.
- San Jose Sharks' franchise record for hat-tricks in a season (5) – 2005–06 season.
- San Jose Sharks' franchise record for hat-tricks in a career (9)

== Career statistics ==
Bold indicates led league

| | | | Regular season | | | | | Playoffs |
| Season | Team | League | GP | G | A | Pts | PIM | GP | G | A | Pts | PIM |
|---|---|---|---|---|---|---|---|---|---|---|---|---|
| 1996–97 | Kitchener Dutchmen | MWJHL | 43 | 35 | 41 | 76 | 33 | — | — | — | — | — |
| 1997–98 | Belleville Bulls | OHL | 64 | 31 | 45 | 76 | 62 | 10 | 4 | 2 | 6 | 10 |
| 1998–99 | Belleville Bulls | OHL | 63 | 35 | 47 | 82 | 74 | 21 | 15 | 15 | 30 | 27 |
| 1999–2000 | Belleville Bulls | OHL | 66 | 45 | 46 | 91 | 102 | 16 | 5 | 12 | 17 | 16 |
| 2000–01 | Kentucky Thoroughblades | AHL | 75 | 32 | 34 | 66 | 63 | 3 | 0 | 0 | 0 | 0 |
| 2001–02 | Cleveland Barons | AHL | 53 | 21 | 25 | 46 | 54 | — | — | — | — | — |
| 2002–03 | San Jose Sharks | NHL | 66 | 9 | 7 | 16 | 39 | — | — | — | — | — |
| 2002–03 | Cleveland Barons | AHL | 9 | 3 | 4 | 7 | 16 | — | — | — | — | — |
| 2003–04 | San Jose Sharks | NHL | 81 | 28 | 19 | 47 | 33 | 17 | 4 | 6 | 10 | 10 |
| 2004–05 | HV71 | SEL | 20 | 5 | 0 | 5 | 5 | — | — | — | — | — |
| 2005–06 | San Jose Sharks | NHL | 82 | **56** | 37 | 93 | 58 | 11 | 4 | 5 | 9 | 8 |
| 2006–07 | San Jose Sharks | NHL | 76 | 37 | 32 | 69 | 69 | 11 | 3 | 3 | 6 | 6 |
| 2007–08 | San Jose Sharks | NHL | 69 | 23 | 14 | 37 | 46 | 13 | 4 | 4 | 8 | 4 |
| 2008–09 | San Jose Sharks | NHL | 66 | 12 | 17 | 29 | 59 | 6 | 1 | 1 | 2 | 4 |
| 2009–10 | Ottawa Senators | NHL | 61 | 5 | 9 | 14 | 20 | 1 | 0 | 0 | 0 | 0 |
| 2009–10 | Binghamton Senators | AHL | 25 | 8 | 6 | 14 | 37 | — | — | — | — | — |
| 2010–11 | Worcester Sharks | AHL | 55 | 18 | 29 | 47 | 14 | — | — | — | — | — |
| 2011–12 | Peoria Rivermen | AHL | 70 | 25 | 31 | 56 | 24 | — | — | — | — | — |
| 2012–13 | Oklahoma City Barons | AHL | 35 | 13 | 19 | 32 | 16 | 17 | 3 | 9 | 12 | 8 |
| 2013–14 | Medveščak Zagreb | KHL | 54 | 19 | 19 | 38 | 40 | 4 | 0 | 2 | 2 | 8 |
| 2014–15 | Dinamo Minsk | KHL | 49 | 24 | 24 | 48 | 34 | 5 | 0 | 1 | 1 | 18 |
| 2015–16 | Dinamo Minsk | KHL | 54 | 16 | 22 | 38 | 28 | — | — | — | — | — |
| 2016–17 | Slovan Bratislava | KHL | 60 | 14 | 26 | 40 | 40 | — | — | — | — | — |
| AHL totals | | | 322 | 120 | 148 | 268 | 224 | 20 | 3 | 9 | 12 | 8 |
| NHL totals | | | 501 | 170 | 135 | 305 | 324 | 59 | 16 | 19 | 35 | 32 |
| KHL totals | | | 217 | 73 | 91 | 164 | 142 | 9 | 0 | 3 | 3 | 26 |

== Awards and honours ==
| Award | Year |
OHL
| CHL Top Prospects Game | 1998 |
| First All-Rookie Team | 1998 |
AHL
| All-Rookie Team | 2001 |
| All-Star Game | 2001, 2011* |
NHL
| NHL YoungStars Game | 2004 |
| Maurice "Rocket" Richard Trophy | 2006 |
| All-Star Game | 2007 |
KHL
| All-Star Game | 2014, 2015, 2017 |

Awards and achievements
| Preceded by Jarome Iginla; Ilya Kovalchuk; Rick Nash | Maurice "Rocket" Richard Trophy winner 2006 | Succeeded by Vincent Lecavalier |
