= Red Triangle (Pacific Ocean) =

Region off the coast of northern California

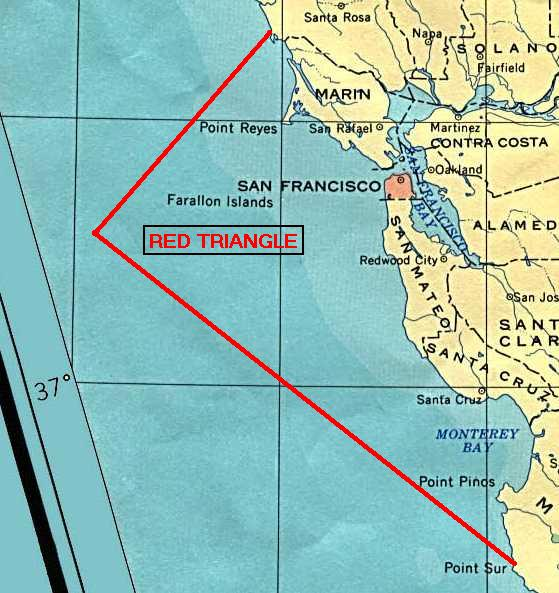
Approximate boundaries of the Red Triangle

The Red Triangle is the colloquial name of a roughly triangle-shaped region off the coast of northern California, extending from Bodega Bay, north of San Francisco, out slightly beyond the Farallon Islands, and down to the Big Sur region, south of Monterey. The area has a very large population of marine mammals, such as elephant seals, harbor seals, sea otters and sea lions, which are favored prey of great white sharks. Around thirty-eight percent of recorded great white shark attacks on humans in the United States have occurred within the Red Triangle—eleven percent of the worldwide total. The area encompasses the beaches of the heavily populated San Francisco Bay Area, and many people enjoy surfing, windsurfing, swimming and diving in these waters.

== Geography ==
The Red Triangle is defined by its vertices: the northern vertex is Bodega Bay (Bodega Head), the western vertex is the Farallones, and the southern vertex is Big Sur or Monterey Bay. The movement of sharks and other large marine animals in this region were studied starting in 1999 under the Tagging of Pacific Predators (TOPP) program, an international collaboration. TOPP found that white sharks in the Red Triangle are genetically distinct from others in the Pacific Ocean, such as those found off Australia.

=== Schedule ===
The population of northeastern Pacific white sharks tend to congregate along the north/central California coast each fall, then leave the area in December for the deep ocean approximately halfway between California and Hawaii. This region is referred to by TOPP as the White Shark Café. Female whites tend to visit the Gulf of the Farallones every two years, which researchers believe to be based on the shark reproductive cycle. Adult Great White Sharks are no longer present in the Red Triangle during the month of May, and start to return in August.
