= Statue of Dirk Nowitzki =

Professional basketball player monument in Dallas, Texas

- The statue depicts Nowitzki shooting his signature one-legged fadeaway
- Interactive map of Statue of Dirk Nowitzki
- Location: PNC Plaza in front of American Airlines Center; Dallas, Texas, US
- Coordinates: 32°47′21″N 96°48′33″W
- Designer: Omri Amrany
- Type: Statue
- Material: White bronze
- Height: 23 feet (7.0 m)
- Weight: >9,000 pounds (4,100 kg)
- Beginning date: Spring 2019
- Opening date: December 25, 2022
- Dedicated to: Dirk Nowitzki
- Nickname: "The Fadeaway"

The statue of Dirk Nowitzki (nicknamed "The Fadeaway") is located in front of the American Airlines Center in Dallas, Texas, United States. The 23-foot (7.0 m) white bronze statue portrays former Dallas Mavericks basketball player Dirk Nowitzki shooting his signature one-legged fadeaway shot. Design began in 2019 and it was unveiled to the public on December 25, 2022. The statue was sculpted by Omri Amrany with Nowitzki himself also participating in the design, along with his wife Jessica and his longtime coach Holger Geschwindner.

== Background ==
As early as January 2018, ESPN writer Tim MacMahon predicted that Nowitzki's one-legged fadeaway would be sculpted onto a statue outside of American Airlines Center, calling it a "safe bet". Plans for the statue began in the spring of 2019. At Nowitzki's final home game, Dallas Mavericks owner Mark Cuban promised that Nowitzki would receive "the biggest, most bad-ass statue ever." Upon hearing this, sports statue sculptor Omri Amrany repeatedly attempted to contact Cuban via phone and email to be chosen as the sculptor. Amrany, who had been sculpting NBA players since 1994, ultimately got the job.

== Design ==
The sculpture depicts Nowitzki in mid-jump about to make "the perfect shot". During the design process, Amrany consulted several people. Nowitzki's wife Jessica, who had previously been a professional in the art industry, was the one who initiated the idea for the accordion-shaped base. Holger Geschwindner, Nowitzki's longtime coach, mentor, and friend, was also involved in helping design the statue body; he taught Amrany that the ideal angle of launch trajectory on Nowitzki's fadeaway was 47–50 degrees. Nowitzki himself also heavily participated in the design. Among other things, he chose the motto inscribed at the base: "Loyalty never fades away", which is a homage to Nowitzki having spent all 21 of his playing seasons with the Mavericks, an NBA record.

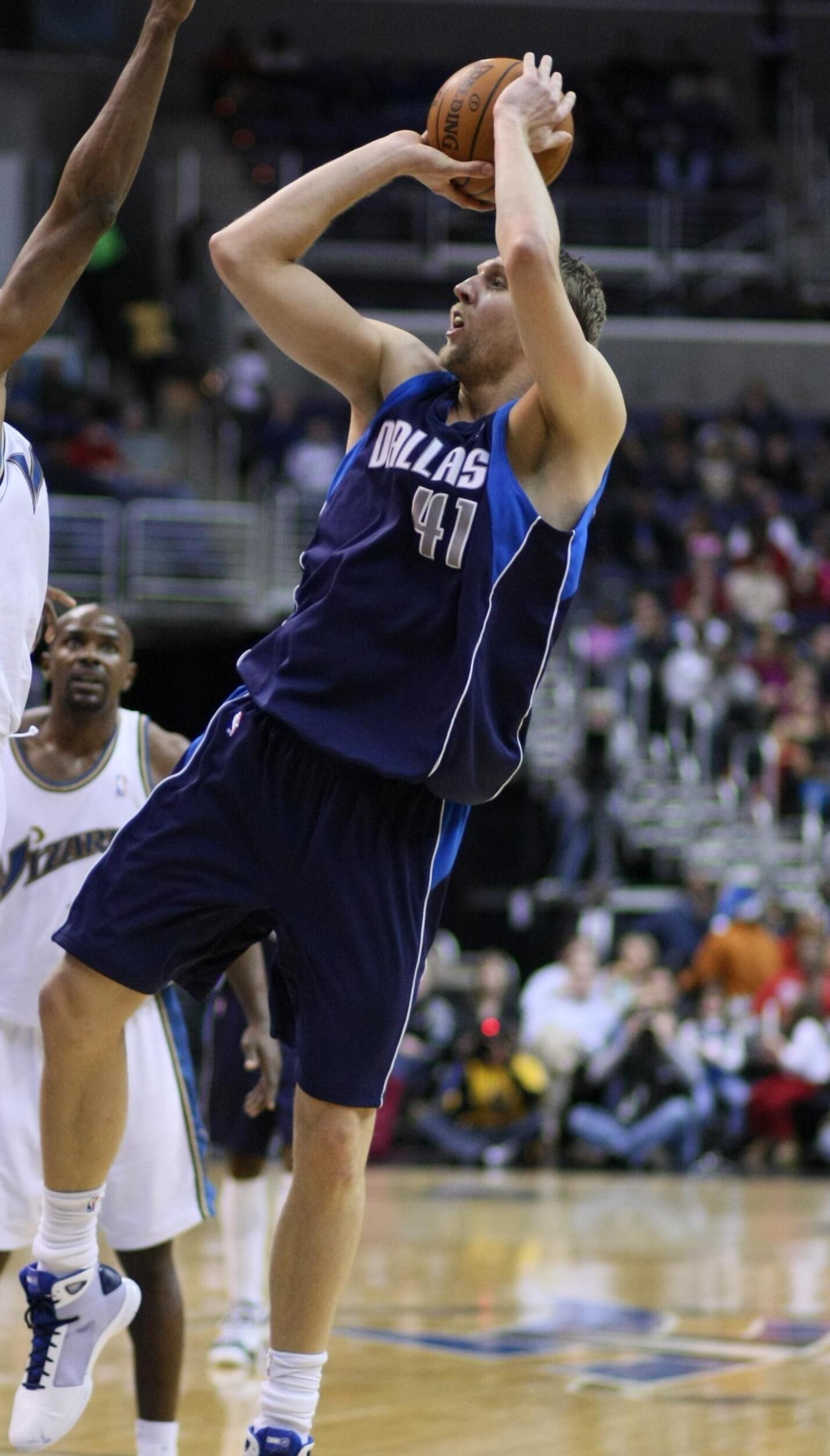
Nowitzki shooting his signature fadeaway jump shot, which inspired the statue's design

The 23 feet (7.0 m) statue is made of white bronze, which is unusual for sports statues. Amrany nicknamed it "The Fadeaway". Nowitzki is represented wearing the shoes and uniform he wore en route to leading the Mavericks to a 2011 NBA Finals victory, the team's only championship. A prototype revealed at Nowitzki's January 2022 jersey retirement had three interconnected balls showing the shooting trajectory, though this feature was met with sharp criticism (particularly on Twitter) and later scrapped; the final version only has one ball. According to SMU physics professor Fredrick Olness, the statue is able to stay in place despite its lopsided and unbalanced appearance because the center of mass is at the base.

== Unveiling and display ==
External videos
- Dirk Statue Unveiling Ceremony via YouTube

The 20-minute unveiling ceremony occurred prior to a Mavericks game against the Los Angeles Lakers on December 25, 2022; Nowitzki and his 7-year-old son shifted a lever to cause the large canvas to lift, revealing the statue. Nowitzki's parents and sister were also at the ceremony, having traveled from their homeland Germany to be in attendance. It is located in front of the American Airlines Center in the PNC Plaza. At nighttime, the statue is sometimes lit up in the Mavericks deep blue color. According to The Sporting News, Nowitzki's one-legged fadeaway shot immortalized on the statue is considered to be "one of the most iconic signature shots that the NBA has ever seen."
