= American Airlines Center =

Indoor arena in Dallas, Texas

- AAC; The Hangar; The House That Dirk Built

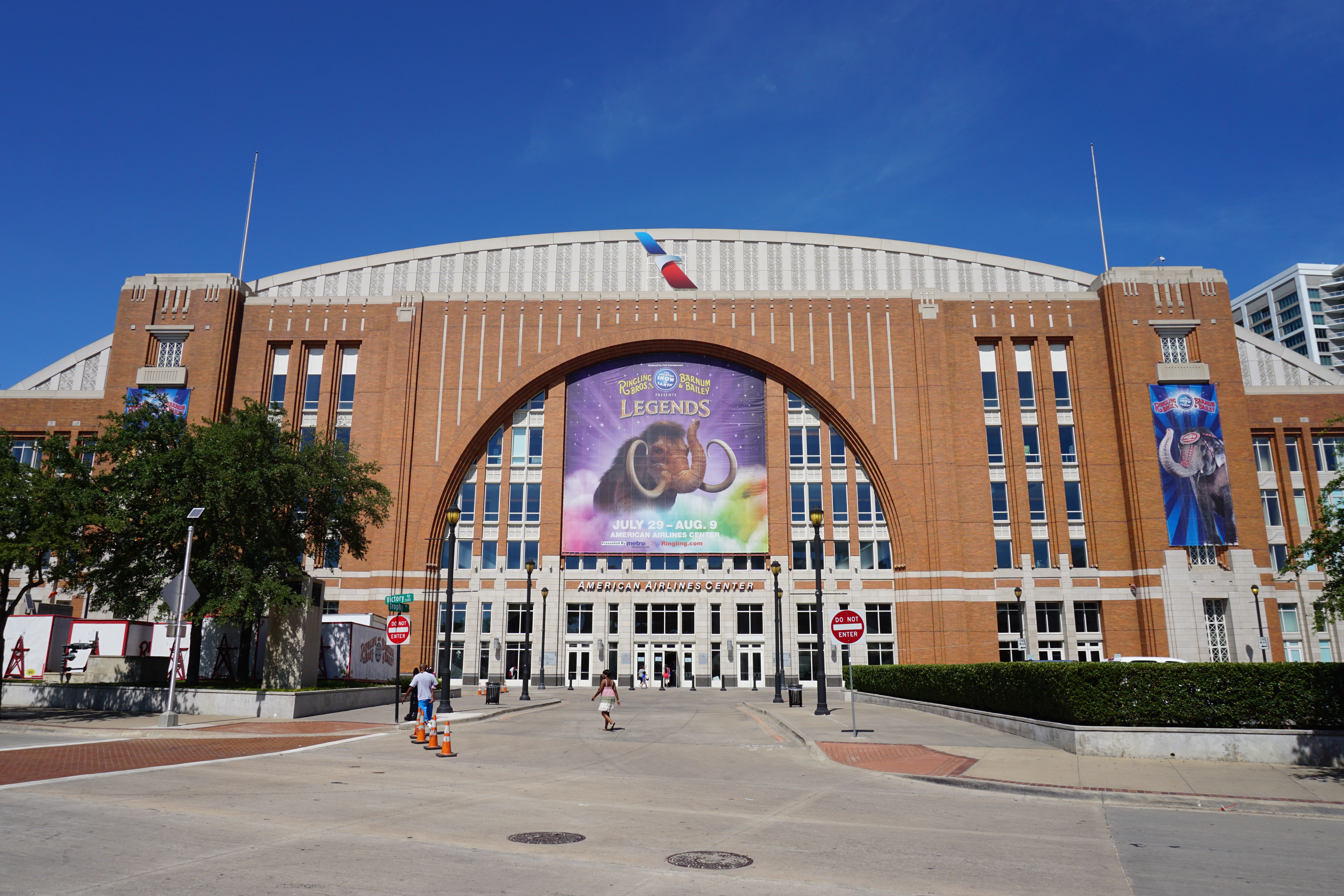
- American Airlines Center in August 2015

- Location in Texas Location in the United States
- Address: 2500 Victory Avenue
- Location: Dallas, Texas, U.S.
- Coordinates: 32°47′26″N 96°48′37″W
- Owner: City of Dallas
- Operator: Center Operating Company, L.P. (a joint venture between the Dallas Mavericks and Dallas Stars)
- Capacity: Basketball: 19,200, up to 21,146 with standing room Ice hockey: 18,532, up to 19,323 with standing room Concerts: 21,000
- Field size: 840,000 sq ft (78,000 m^{2})
- Public transit: Trinity Railway Express; Dallas Area Rapid Transit: Green Line; Orange Line at Victory

Construction
- Groundbreaking: September 1, 1999
- Opened: July 17, 2001
- Cost: US$420 million (US$764 million in 2025 dollars)
- Architects: David M. Schwarz/Architectural Services, Inc. HKS, Inc. Johnson/McKibben Architects, Inc.
- Project managers: International Facilities Group, LLC.
- Structural engineer: Walter P Moore
- Services engineer: Flack & Kurtz Inc.
- General contractor: Austin Commercial/H.J. Russell

Tenants
- Dallas Mavericks (NBA) (2001–present); Dallas Stars (NHL) (2001–present); Dallas Desperados (AFL) (2002, 2004–2008); Dallas Vigilantes (AFL) (2010–2011); Dallas Wings (WNBA) (2027–future)

Website
- americanairlinescenter.com

American Airlines Center (AAC) is a multi-purpose indoor arena located in the Victory Park neighborhood in downtown Dallas, Texas. The arena serves as the home of the Dallas Stars of the National Hockey League (NHL) and Dallas Mavericks of the National Basketball Association (NBA). The arena is also used for concerts and other live entertainment. It opened on July 17, 2001, at a cost of $420 million.

== History and construction ==
By 1998, the Dallas Mavericks, then owned by H. Ross Perot Jr., and the Dallas Stars were indicating their desire for a new arena to replace the aging and undersized Reunion Arena. Dallas taxpayers approved a new hotel tax and rental car tax to pay for a new arena to cover a portion of the funding, with the two benefiting teams, the Mavericks and the Stars, picking up the remaining costs, including cost overruns. The new arena was to be built just north of Woodall Rodgers Freeway near Interstate 35E on the site of an old power plant.

On March 18, 1999, American Airlines (AA) announced that it would be acquiring the naming rights for the arena for $195 million. AA is headquartered in nearby Fort Worth and is based at Dallas/Fort Worth International Airport. From its opening in 2001 until 2013, the AAC had the then-current AA logo; thereafter the AAC has used the current AA logo.

The first event occurred the next day with an Eagles concert. On the next night, the arena hosted the last show of Michael Flatley's Feet of Flames tour. The first sporting event took place on August 19, 2001, with the Dallas Sidekicks of the World Indoor Soccer League taking on the San Diego Sockers.

The AAC includes a practice court for the Mavericks, who used it for regular practices until 2017 when a separate facility was built in the Dallas Design District near the arena.

The Mavericks' lease on the AAC runs through to 2031. Afterwards, the team could move to a new arena in Irving, which could be part of a new integrated resort being proposed by Las Vegas Sands.

On August 3, 2026, the Dallas Wings of the Women's National Basketball Association will temporarily move to the AAC for at least the 2027 WNBA season due to delays on renovations at the Dallas Memorial Auditorium.

== Design ==
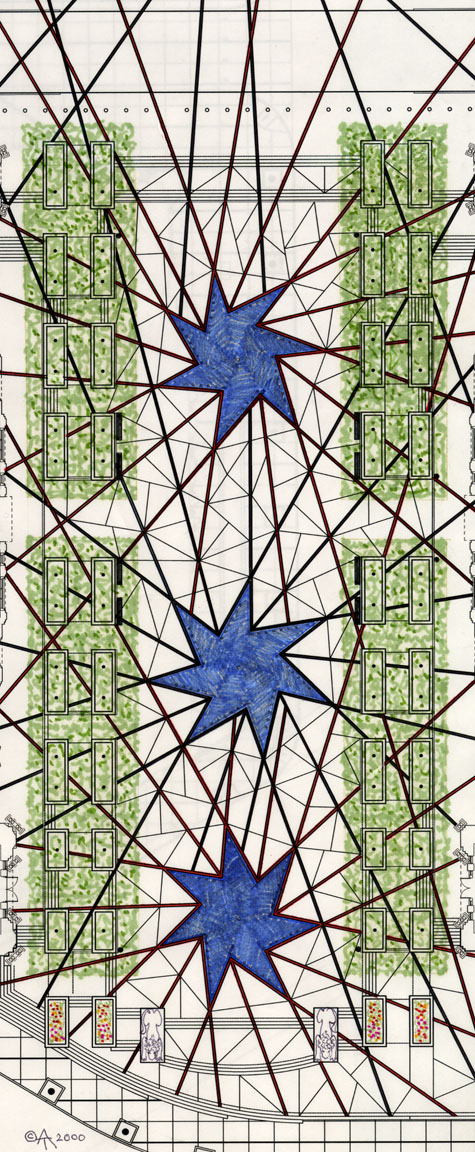
Athena Tacha, ground-plan of PNC Plaza with star fountains, in front of American Airlines Center (2,000 sq ft (190 m^{2}), 40,000 sq ft (3,700 m^{2}), in collaboration with SWA)

Principal design work was carried out by the Driehaus Prize winner and New Classical architect David M. Schwarz of Washington D.C. American Airlines Center was designed to be the heart of a new urban, commercial area designed to reinvigorate the city of Dallas called Victory Park. The facility itself features a conservative, traditional design with sweeping brick façades and smooth arches. The interior includes retractable seating, public art and a technological arena. Because of the Quonset hut-like appearance of its roof and the fact that American Airlines holds the naming rights some fans have come to refer to it as "The Hangar".

=== PNC Plaza ===
On the south side of the arena, PNC Plaza (formerly called Victory Plaza and AT&T Plaza) serves as the principal entrance into the facility. Designed by artist Athena Tacha in 2000, the plaza provides an open space with fountains flanked by retail and office buildings. With several HD video displays from Daktronics mounted on the side of the arena and office buildings, the plaza is often used for outdoor events and movie showings. PNC Plaza is also the site of the Dirk Nowitzki statue, which depicts the former Mavericks player shooting his signature one-legged fadeaway jump shot.

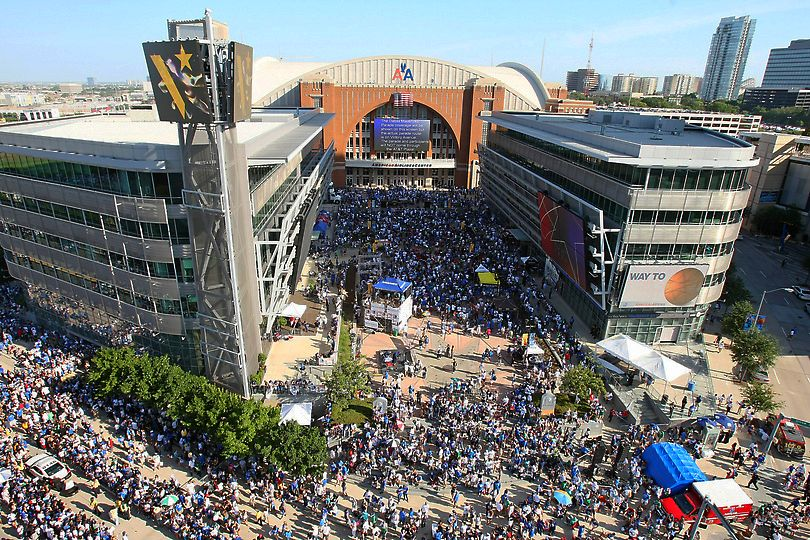
American Airlines Center-Mavericks Victory Party for NBA Championship 2011

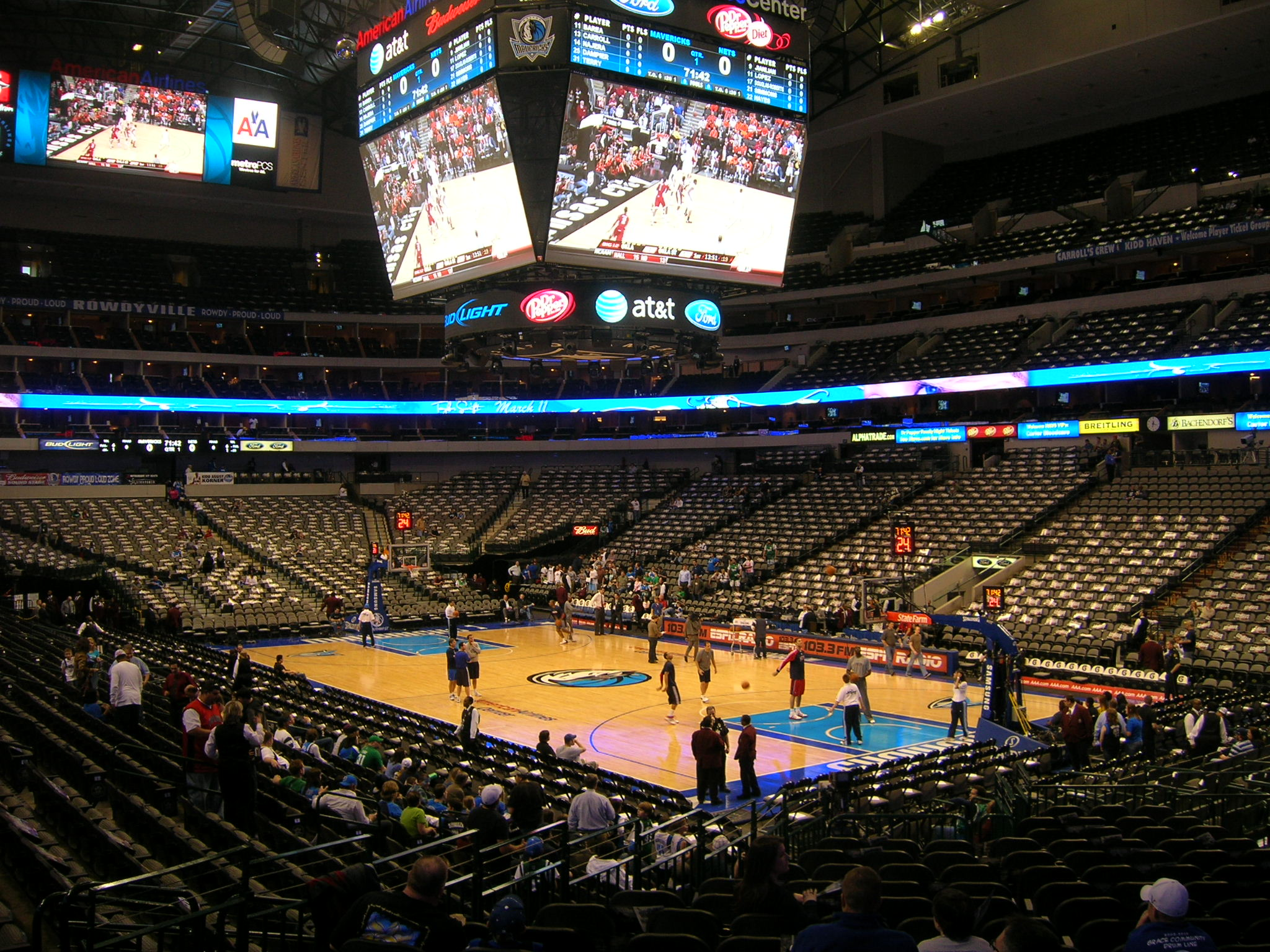
Inside American Airlines Center prior to a Mavericks game in March 2010

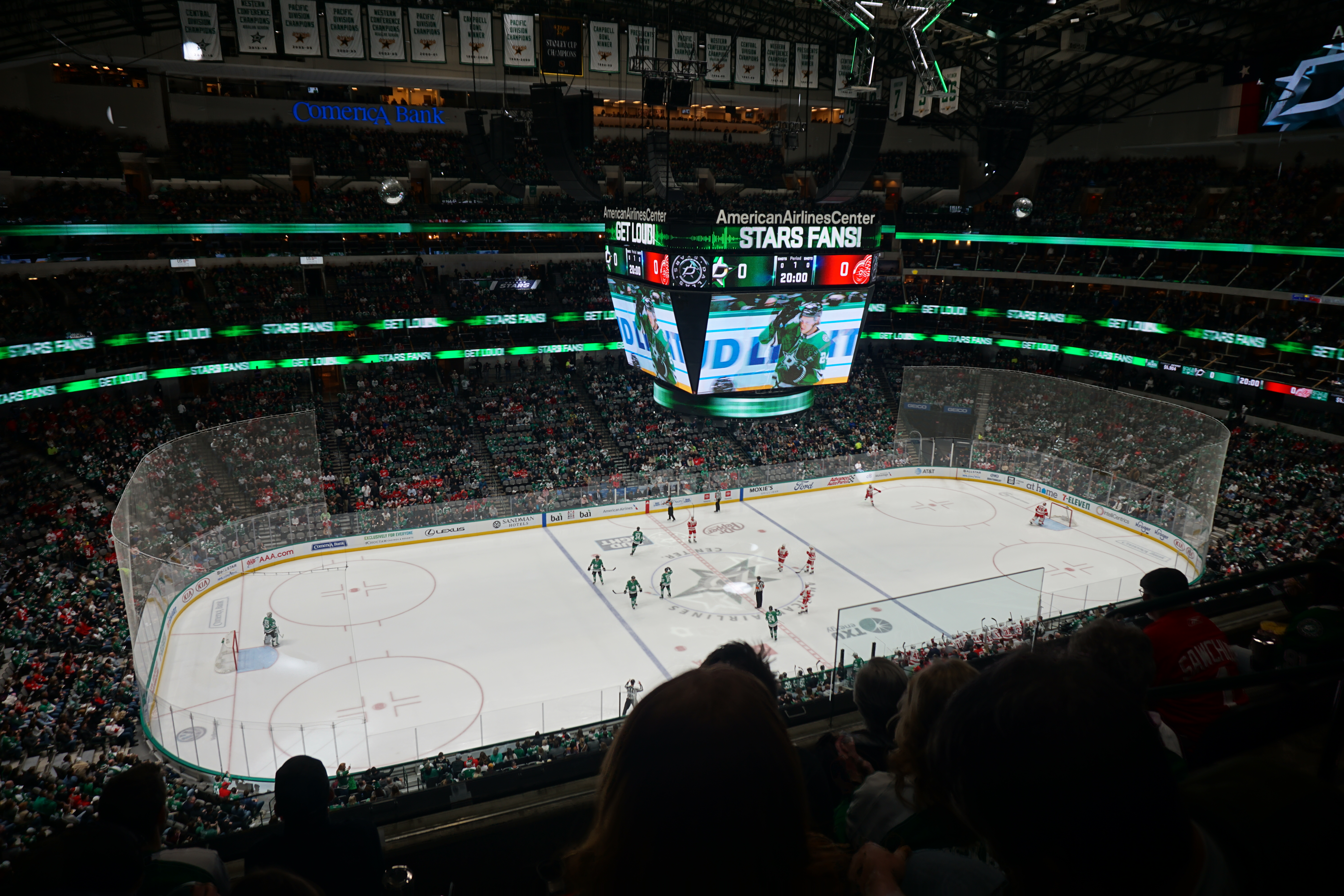
Inside American Airlines Center during a Stars game in January 2020

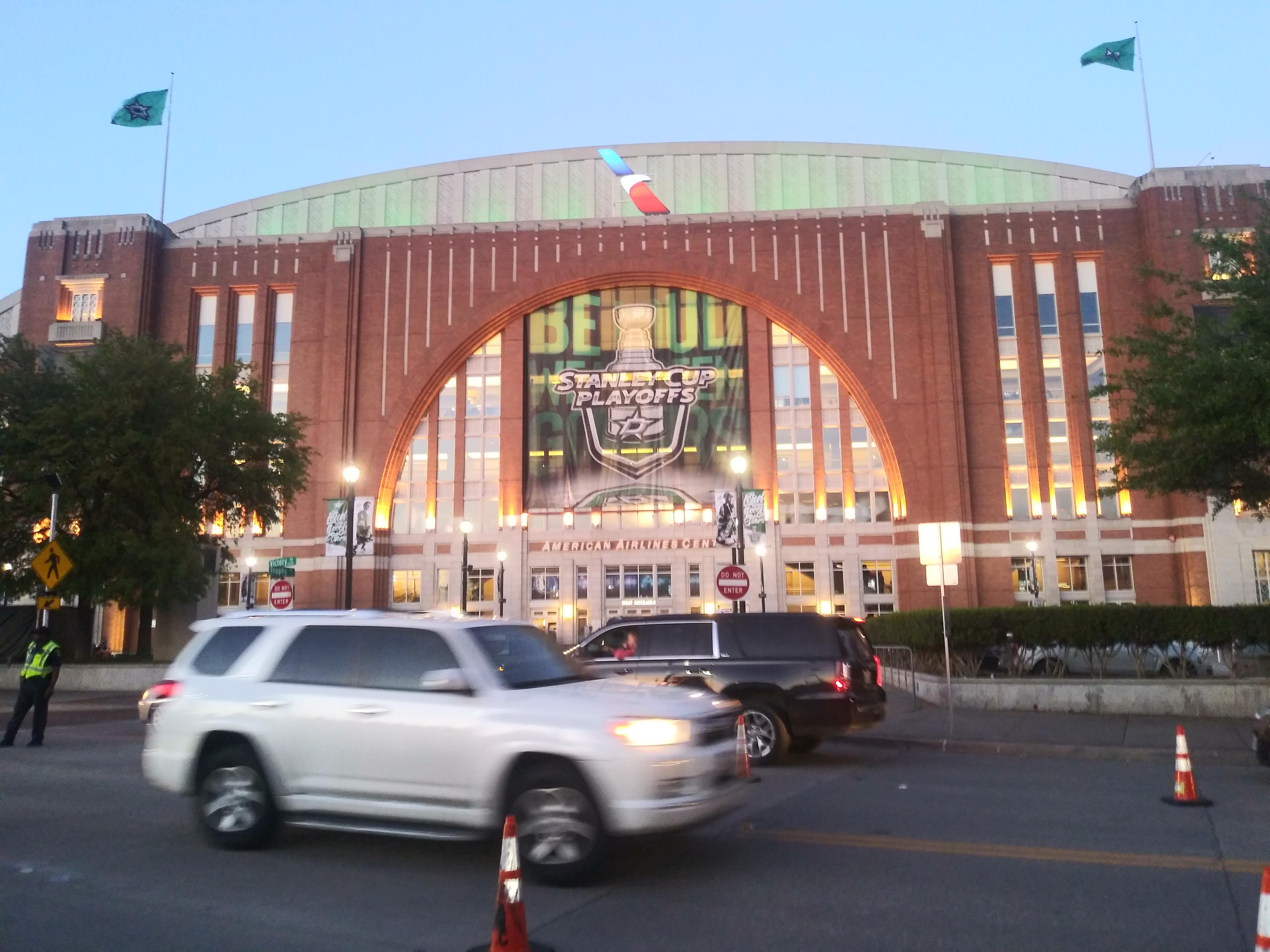
Western entrance of American Airlines Center before game 3 of the 2019 Stanley Cup playoffs between the Dallas Stars and the Nashville Predators

== Notable events ==
=== Sports ===
- After the Dallas Desperados played their first season in the AAC, they moved to nearby Reunion Arena and played there for their second season. For their third season, they moved back to the AAC, where they played until the league folded.
- The AAC hosted the Big 12 Basketball tournament in 2003, 2004 & 2006.
- The PBR hosted a Built Ford Tough Series bull riding event at the AAC, annually, between 2005 & 2009.
- American Airlines Center, as well as the then-named American Airlines Arena (now Kaseya Center) in Miami, Florida, hosted the 2006 and 2011 NBA Finals, in which the Dallas Mavericks played the Miami Heat in both franchises' first two Finals appearances. The Heat won the 2006 series 4–2, closing out in Dallas, and the Mavericks won the 2011 series 4–2, closing in Miami. Because American Airlines held the rights to both venues in the NBA Finals, these series were nicknamed by some as the "American Airlines series". The arena also hosted the 2024 NBA Finals, in which the Boston Celtics split the two games in Dallas while winning all of its games at TD Garden to win the championship in five games.
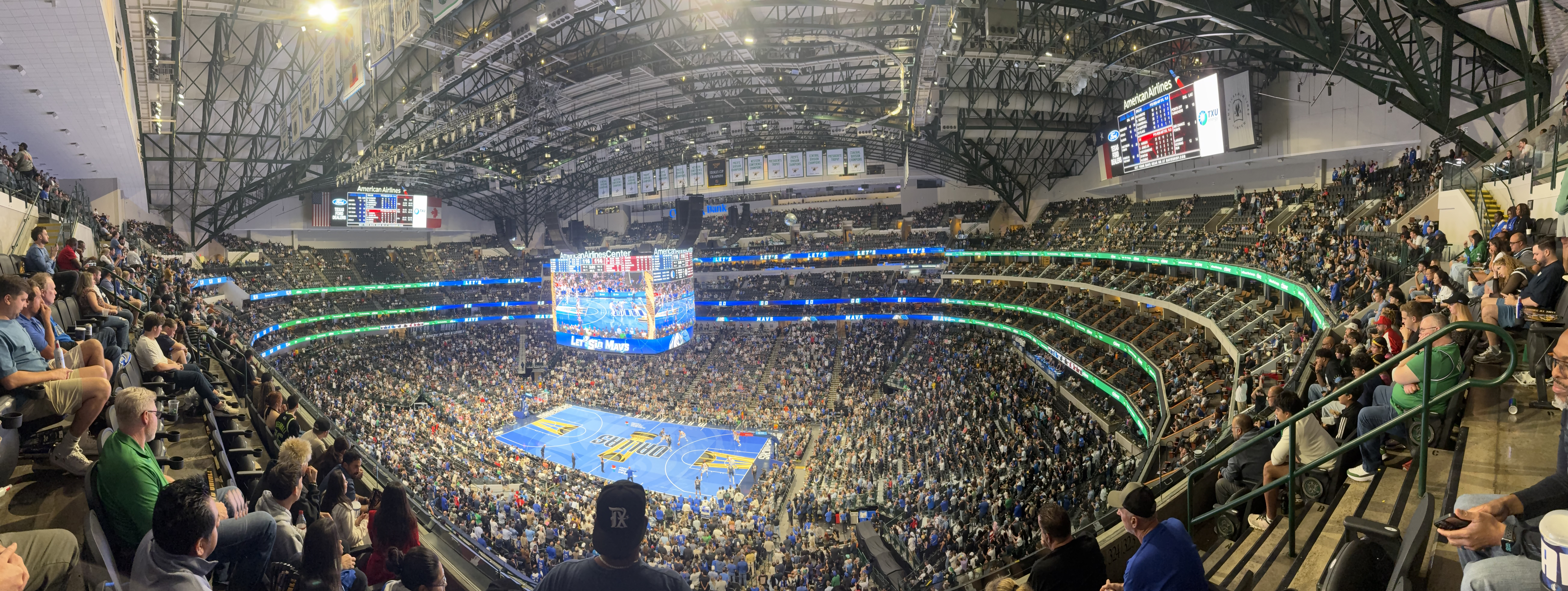
  A panoramic photo of the November 14, 2025, Dallas Mavericks game vs. the Los Angeles Clippers at American Airlines Center.
- Hosted the 55th National Hockey League All-Star Game on January 24, 2007.
- Hosted a watch party for the 2020 Stanley Cup Finals between the Dallas Stars and Tampa Bay Lightning. However, the Stars lost to the Lightning in six games.
- On Saturday June 18, 2011, it played host to Strikeforce: Overeem vs. Werdum.
- UFC 103: Franklin vs. Belfort was held at the Center on September 19, 2009. UFC 171: Hendricks vs. Lawler was held at the Center on March 15, 2014. UFC 185: Pettis vs. dos Anjos was held at the Center on March 14, 2015. UFC 211: Miocic vs. dos Santos 2 was held at the Center on May 13, 2017. UFC 228: Woodley vs. Till was held at the Center on September 8, 2018. UFC 277: Peña vs. Nunes 2 was held at the Center on July 30, 2022.
- On September 24, 2016, the arena hosted the Kellogg's Tour of Gymnastics Champions.
- American Airlines Center hosted the opening round of round-robin matches of New Japan Pro-Wrestling's G1 Climax series on July 6, 2019.
- The arena also hosted the Junior Gold Championships Opening Ceremony. The Junior Gold championships is an annual bowling tournament every July, for the best youth bowlers in the country and in the world.
- American Airlines Center hosted first and second-round games of the 2006 and 2018 NCAA men's basketball tournaments. For the NCAA women's basketball tournament, American Airlines Center hosted the Finals in 2017, and in 2023, along with the regional semifinals/finals in 2016 and 2011.
- Two Mavericks games in early 2022—one against the Timberwolves on March 21 and a playoff against the Golden State Warriors on May 24—had to be delayed when the roof developed a leak.
- American Airlines Center has also hosted WWE events as well, including its regular weekly shows Raw and SmackDown, and its PPV events including Survivor Series 2003, Night of Champions 2008, Hell in a Cell 2010 and 2014, TLC: Tables, Ladders & Chairs (2016), WWE Great Balls of Fire, and NXT Stand & Deliver (2022), the arena also hosted Saturday Night's Main Event XXXIII in 2006, and the 2022 WWE Hall of Fame ceremony on April 1, being notable for The Undertaker being inducted and headlining this year's aforementioned event.
- On August 5, 2023, American Airlines Center hosted professional boxing bout Jake Paul vs. Nate Diaz.
- On June 27, 2025, American Airlines Center hosted the WNBA's Dallas Wings vs the Indiana Fever.
- On December 28, 2025, American Airlines Center hosted the Professional Women's Hockey League's Seattle Torrent and New York Sirens for a PWHL Takeover Tour game which was also the first PWHL game in Dallas. The Sirens won 4–3 against the Torrent in front of 8,514 fans.

=== In film and TV ===
- The AAC was pictured in The Simpsons episode "The Burns and the Bees" as "Dallas Arena".
- On Tuesday, June 21 and Wednesday, June 22, 2011, it played host to the Dallas audition stages in the first season of the Fox singer search program The X Factor.

=== Other information ===
- Built on and in the shadows of the former Dallas neighborhood of Little Mexico, the beginnings of the Mexican American population in the Dallas area.
- A few weeks after the first event, it was found that the glass installed in the bathrooms was not the same as what was originally intended. Many who drove by the arena complained they had a clear view into the restrooms. The glass was quickly changed to the correct type the next week.
- The venue was the site of the 2026 Republican National Convention.

== See also ==
- List of indoor arenas in the United States

Events and tenants
Preceded by Reunion Arena	Home of the Dallas Mavericks; 2001 – present	Succeeded by current
Preceded by Reunion Arena	Home of the Dallas Stars; 2001 – present	Succeeded by current
Preceded by Xcel Energy Center	Host of the NHL All-Star Game; 2007	Succeeded by Philips Arena
Preceded by Bankers Life Fieldhouse	NCAA Women's Division I Basketball tournament Finals Venue; 2017	Succeeded by Nationwide Arena
