= Fall away =

Fall away may refer to

- Backsliding, in Christianity
- Fall-away (basketball), a type of basketball shot
- Fallaway (dance), a dance movement
- "Fall Away", a 2009 song by American musical duo Twenty One Pilots
- "Fall Away", a 2005 song by the Fray on their album, How to Save a Life

== See also ==
- Fallaway slam in professional wrestling
