= Dirk Nowitzki: German Wunderkind =

2004 book by Dino Reisner and Holger Sauer

- Cover of the book
- Author: Dino Reisner and Holger Sauer
- Language: German
- Genre: Biography
- Publisher: Stiebner Verlag GmbH
- Publication date: 2004
- Publication place: Germany
- Media type: Hardcover, paperback
- Pages: 160
- ISBN: 3-7679-0872-7

Dirk Nowitzki: German Wunderkind (stylized as DIRK NOWITZKI German wunderkind) is a biography of the German NBA basketball star Dirk Nowitzki, written by German sports journalists Dino Reisner and Holger Sauer. It was published in 2004 by the German "Copress" publishing house. It follows Nowitzki's life as a boy in Würzburg, how he turned to basketball as a teenager, broke through in Germany and eventually became the franchise player of the Dallas Mavericks in the NBA.

== Book synopsis ==
In this book, Reisner and Sauer follow the career of Dirk Nowitzki, beginning with his middle-class beginnings in Würzburg. Originally interested in tennis and handball, the tall Nowitzki (who grew to become 7-foot-0) was drawn to basketball after being repeatedly taunted as a "freak" by his opponents. After being discovered by local basketball trainer Jürgen Meng, he met trainer Holger Geschwindner, who became his lifelong mentor and friend. Both discovered he had a natural talent for this sport and eventually became a star for the small local basketball club DJK Würzburg.

After attracting the attention of Dallas Mavericks head coach and manager Don Nelson, Nowitzki made the jump to the NBA and was drafted by the Milwaukee Bucks, but was immediately traded to the Mavericks in the 1998 NBA draft. Shell-shocked by the culture shock, facing a longer season, more physical opponents, and a relatively foreign culture, he struggled in America, and even considered returning to Europe, until Nelson and Geschwindner talked him out of it. Becoming a regular player, a starter, and later an All-Star, the book presents the eventful playoff campaigns of the Mavericks until 2004. The book ends in the middle of the 2004–05 NBA season.

The book mostly follows a chronological structure, and devotes inserts for many people close to Nowitzki, such as his parents Helga and Jörg-Werner Nowitzki, who are both retired German professional handball players; his sister, Silke; his ex-girlfriend of seven years Sybille Gerer (former player of Nowitzki's former basketball club DJK Würzburg), his discoverer Jürgen Meng, his mentors Geschwindner and Nelson, and his best friend Steve Nash. An extra section of the book is inserted at the end, which deals with his performances in the Germany national basketball team separately.
