= Dirk Nowitzki =

German basketball player (born 1978)

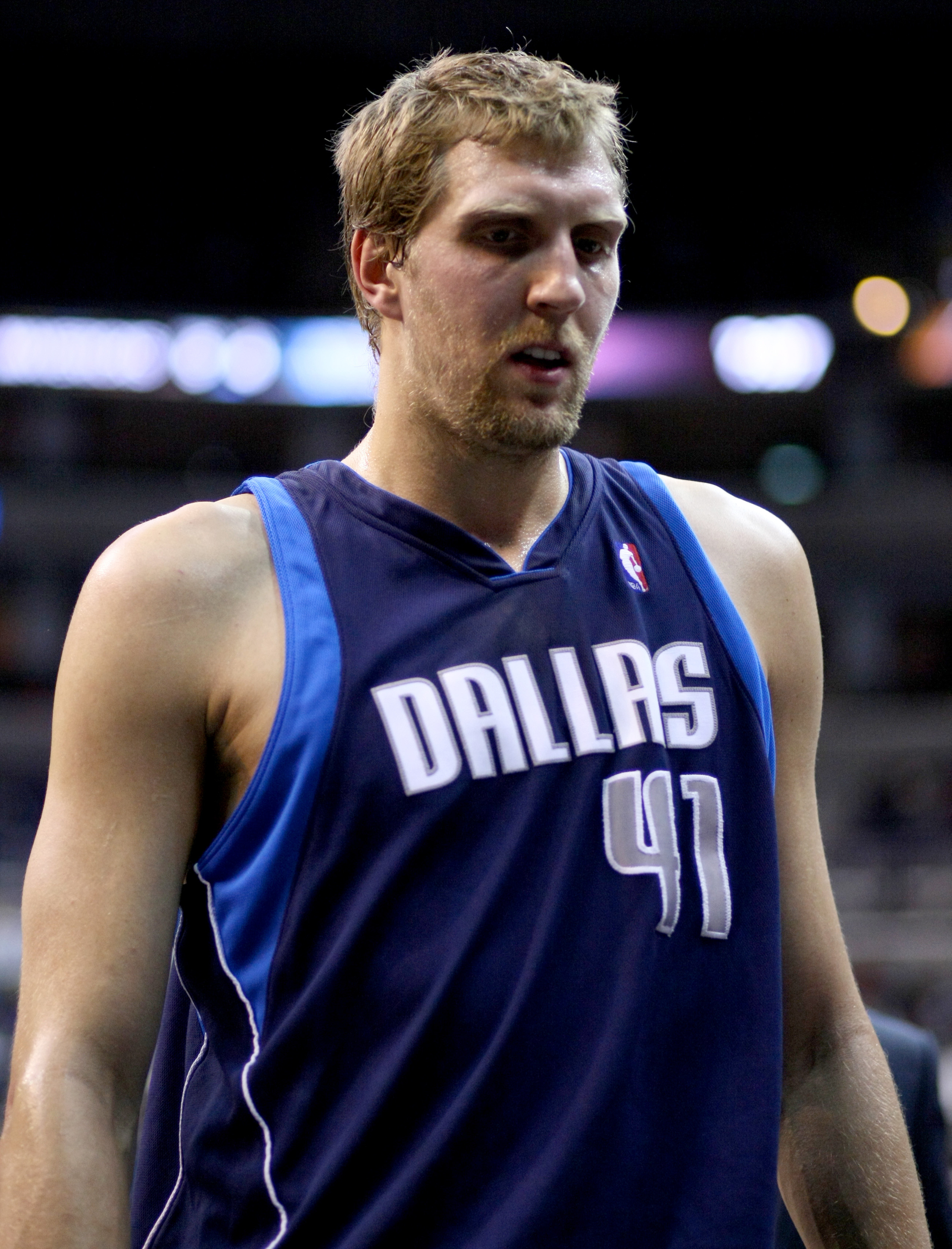
- Nowitzki with the Dallas Mavericks in 2008

Dallas Mavericks
- Title: Special advisor
- League: NBA

Personal information
- Born: June 19, 1978 (age 48) Würzburg, West Germany
- Listed height: 7 ft 0 in (2.13 m)
- Listed weight: 245 lb (111 kg)

Career information
- NBA draft: 1998: 1st round, 9th overall pick
- Drafted by: Milwaukee Bucks
- Playing career: 1994–2019
- Position: Power forward
- Number: 41

Career history
- 1994–1998: DJK Würzburg
- 1998–2019: Dallas Mavericks

Career highlights
- NBA champion (2011); NBA Finals MVP (2011); NBA Most Valuable Player (2007); 14× NBA All-Star (2002–2012, 2014, 2015, 2019); 4× All-NBA First Team (2005–2007, 2009); 5× All-NBA Second Team (2002, 2003, 2008, 2010, 2011); 3× All-NBA Third Team (2001, 2004, 2012); NBA Three-Point Contest champion (2006); NBA 75th Anniversary Team; No. 41 retired by Dallas Mavericks; German Bundesliga MVP (1999); German Bundesliga Top Scorer (1999); FIBA World Cup MVP (2002); FIBA Basketball World Cup Top Scorer; FIBA EuroBasket MVP (2005); 2× FIBA EuroBasket Top Scorer; FIBA EuroBasket Dream Team (2020); 6× Euroscar Player of the Year (2002–2006, 2011); 2× FIBA Europe Men's Player of the Year (2005, 2011); Mister Europa Player of the Year (2005); Silbernes Lorbeerblatt (2011); German Sports Personality of the Year (2011); Laureus Lifetime Achievement Award (2020); No. 14 retired by Germany national team

Career statistics
- Points: 31,560 (20.7 ppg)
- Rebounds: 11,489 (7.5 rpg)
- Assists: 3,651 (2.4 apg)
- Stats at NBA.com
- Stats at Basketball Reference
- Basketball Hall of Fame
- FIBA Hall of Fame
Medals
Men's basketball
Representing Germany
World Cup
Bronze medal – third place	2002 Indianapolis
EuroBasket
Silver medal – second place	2005 Serbia and Montenegro

Dirk Werner Nowitzki (German: [ˈdɪʁk noˈvɪtski]; born June 19, 1978) is a German former professional basketball player who is a special advisor for the Dallas Mavericks of the National Basketball Association (NBA), with whom he played his entire 21-year career as a power forward. Listed at 7 ft 0 in (2.13 m), he is widely regarded as one of the greatest power forwards of all time and is considered by many to be the greatest European player of all time.

An alumnus of the DJK Würzburg basketball club, Nowitzki was chosen as the ninth pick in the 1998 NBA draft by the Milwaukee Bucks and was immediately traded to the Dallas Mavericks. Nowitzki led the franchise to 15 NBA playoff appearances (2001–2012; 2014–2016), including the franchise's first NBA Finals appearance in 2006 and its only NBA championship in 2011. Known for his scoring ability, versatility, accurate outside shooting, and trademark one-legged fadeaway jump shot, Nowitzki won the NBA Most Valuable Player Award in 2007 and the NBA Finals Most Valuable Player Award in 2011.

Nowitzki is the only player to ever play for a single NBA franchise for 21 seasons. He is a 14-time All-Star, a 12-time All-NBA Team member, the first European player to start in an All-Star Game, and the first European player to receive the NBA Most Valuable Player Award. Nowitzki is the highest-scoring foreign-born player in NBA history. The first Maverick to be voted onto an All-NBA Team, he holds several all-time Mavericks franchise records. On December 10, 2012, he became the first non-American player to receive the Naismith Legacy Award. Following his retirement, Nowitzki stood sixth on the NBA all-time scoring list.

In international play, Nowitzki led the Germany national team to a bronze medal in the 2002 FIBA World Championship and a silver medal in EuroBasket 2005; he was the leading scorer and MVP in both tournaments. He is also the first German men's player to have his number retired, receiving this honor in September 2022. In 2021, he was selected to the NBA 75th Anniversary Team. Nowitzki was inducted into the Naismith Memorial Basketball Hall of Fame in 2023 and into the FIBA Hall of Fame in 2026.

== Early life ==
Born in Würzburg, Germany, Dirk Werner Nowitzki comes from an athletic family: his mother Helga (née Bredenbröcker) was a professional basketball player and his father Jörg-Werner was a handball player who represented Germany at the highest international level. Helga was a member of the West Germany national team that participated at the 1966 EuroBasket Women. His older sister Silke Nowitzki, a local champion in track and field, also became a basketball player and now works for the NBA in International TV.

Nowitzki was a very tall child; most of the time he stood above his peers by a foot or more. He initially played handball and tennis. He managed to become a ranked junior tennis player in the German youth circuit, but soon grew tired of being called a "freak" for his height and eventually turned to basketball. Watching the 1992 U.S. Olympic basketball "Dream Team" also caused Nowitzki to gravitate towards basketball. After joining the local DJK Würzburg, the 15-year-old attracted the attention of former German international basketball player Holger Geschwindner, who spotted his talent immediately and offered to coach him individually two to three times per week. After getting both the approval of Nowitzki and his parents, Geschwindner put his student through an unorthodox training scheme: he emphasized shooting and passing exercises, and shunned weight training and tactical drills, because he felt it was "unnecessary friction". Furthermore, Geschwindner encouraged Nowitzki to play a musical instrument and read literature to make him a more complete personality.

After a year, the coach was so impressed with Nowitzki's progress that he advised him, "You must now decide whether you want to play against the best in the world or just stay a local hero in Germany. If you choose the latter, we will stop training immediately, because nobody can prevent that anymore. But if you want to play against the best, we have to train on a daily basis." After pondering this lifetime decision for two days, Nowitzki agreed to enter the full-time training schedule, choosing the path to his eventual international career. Geschwindner let him train seven days a week with DJK Würzburg players and future German internationals Robert Garrett, Marvin Willoughby, and Demond Greene, and in the summer of 1994, then 16-year-old Nowitzki made the DJK squad.

== Professional career ==
=== DJK Würzburg (1994–1998) ===
When Nowitzki joined the team, DJK played in Germany's second-tier level league, the Second Bundesliga, South Division. His first trainer was Pit Stahl, who played the tall teenager as an outside-scoring forward rather than an inside-scoring center to use his shooting skills. Nowitzki chose to wear the jersey number 14 because Charles Barkley wore that number during the 1992 Olympics. In the 1994–95 Second Bundesliga season, ambitious DJK finished as a disappointing sixth of 12 teams; the rookie Nowitzki was often benched and struggled with bad school grades, which forced him to study rather than work on his game. In the next 1995–96 Second Bundesliga season, Nowitzki established himself as a starter next to Finnish star forward Martti Kuisma and soon became a regular double-digit scorer. After German national basketball coach Dirk Bauermann saw him score 24 points in a DJK game, he said, "Dirk Nowitzki is the greatest German basketball talent of the last 10, maybe 15 years."

In the 1996–97 Second Bundesliga season, Nowitzki averaged 19.4 points per game and led DJK again to second place after the regular season, but could not help his team gain promotion. In the following 1997–98 Second Bundesliga season, Nowitzki finished his "Abitur" (German A-levels), but had to do compulsory military service in the Bundeswehr which lasted from September 1, 1997, to June 30, 1998. The 18-year-old, who had grown to 6 ft 11 in (2.11 m) tall, made progress, leading DJK to a 36:4-point total (in Germany, a victory gives 2:0 points and a loss 0:2) and ending as leading scorer with 28.2 points per game. In the promotion playoffs, DJK finally broke its hex, finishing at first place with 14:2 points and earning promotion to the next higher league; Nowitzki was voted "German Basketballer of the Year" by the German BASKET magazine.

Abroad, Nowitzki's progress was noticed. A year later, the teenager participated in the Nike "Hoop Heroes Tour", where he played against NBA stars like Charles Barkley and Scottie Pippen. In a 30-minute show match, Nowitzki outplayed Barkley and even dunked on him, causing the latter to exclaim: "The boy is a genius. If he wants to enter the NBA, he can call me." On March 29, 1998, Nowitzki was chosen to play in the Nike Hoop Summit, one of the premier talent watches in U.S. men's basketball. In a match between the U.S. talents and the international talents, Nowitzki scored 33 points on 6-of-12 shooting, 14 rebounds and 3 steals for the internationals and outplayed future US NBA players Rashard Lewis and Al Harrington. He impressed with a combination of quickness, ball handling, and shooting range, and from that moment a multitude of European and NBA clubs wanted to recruit him.

=== Dallas Mavericks (1998–2019) ===
==== Difficult start (1998–2000) ====
Projected to be the seventh pick in the 1998 NBA draft, Nowitzki passed up many college offers and went directly into the NBA as a prep-to-pro player. The Milwaukee Bucks selected Nowitzki with the ninth pick in the draft and traded him to the Dallas Mavericks in a multi-team deal; future star point guard Steve Nash came to Dallas in the same trade. Nowitzki and Nash quickly became close friends. Nowitzki became only the fourth German player in NBA history, following pivots Uwe Blab and Christian Welp and All-Star swingman Detlef Schrempf, who was a 35-year-old veteran of the Seattle SuperSonics when his young compatriot arrived. Nowitzki finished his DJK career as the only Würzburg player to have ever made the NBA. Nowitzki was unable to continue to wear his No. 14 jersey with the Mavericks because Robert Pack was already wearing it, so he swapped the digits and wore No. 41 instead.

In Dallas, Nowitzki joined a franchise which had last made the playoffs in 1990. Shooting guard Michael Finley captained the squad, supported by 7-foot-6-inch (2.29 m) center Shawn Bradley (once a number two draft pick) and team scoring leader Cedric Ceballos, an ex-Laker forward. The start of the season was delayed by the 1998–99 NBA lockout, which put the entire season in jeopardy. In limbo, Nowitzki returned to DJK Würzburg and played thirteen games before both sides worked out a late compromise deal that resulted in a shortened NBA schedule of only 50 games. When the season finally started, Nowitzki struggled. Played as a power forward by coach Don Nelson, the 20-year-old felt overpowered by the more athletic NBA forwards, was intimidated by the expectations as a number nine pick, and played bad defense; hecklers taunted him as "Irk Nowitzki", omitting the "D" which stands for "defense" in basketball slang. He only averaged 8.2 points and 3.4 rebounds in 20.4 minutes of playing time. Looking back, Nowitzki said: "I was so frustrated I even contemplated going back to Germany. ... [the jump from Second Bundesliga to the NBA] was like jumping out of an airplane hoping the parachute would somehow open." The Mavericks only won 19 of their 50 games and missed the playoffs.

On January 4, 2000, team owner Ross Perot Jr. sold the Mavericks to Internet billionaire Mark Cuban for $280 million. Cuban quickly invested into the Mavericks and restructured the franchise, attending every game at the sidelines, buying the team a $46 million Boeing 757 to travel in, and increasing franchise revenues to over $100 million. Nowitzki lauded Cuban, stating that he "created the perfect environment ... we only have to go out and win." As a result of Nelson's tutelage, Cuban's improvements and his own progress, Nowitzki significantly improved in his second season. Nowitzki averaged 17.5 points, 6.5 rebounds and 2.5 assists per game in 35.8 minutes. He was voted runner-up in the NBA Most Improved Player Award behind Jalen Rose, and made it into the NBA All-Star Sophomore squad. The 7-foot-0-inch (2.13 m) Nowitzki also was chosen for the Three-Point Contest, becoming the tallest player ever to participate. While he improved on an individual level, the Mavericks missed the playoffs after a mediocre 40–42 season.

==== First playoff appearances (2000–2004) ====
Nowitzki further improved his averages, recording 21.8 points, 9.2 rebounds, and 2.1 assists per game. As a sign of his growing importance, he joined team captain Finley as only one of two Mavericks to play and start in all 82 games, and had 10 games in which he scored at least 30 points. Nowitzki became the first Maverick ever to be voted into the All-NBA squads, making the Third Team. In addition, his best friend Nash became a valuable point guard, and with Finley scoring more than ever, pundits took to calling this trio the "Big Three" of the Mavericks.

Posting a 53–29 record in the regular season, the Mavericks reached the playoffs for the first time since 1990. As the fifth seed, they were paired against the Utah Jazz, who were led by point guard John Stockton and power forward Karl Malone. The Mavericks won the series in five games, setting up a meeting with their Texas rivals, the San Antonio Spurs. The Mavericks lost the first three games of the series, and Nowitzki fell ill with the flu and later lost a tooth after a collision with Spurs guard Terry Porter. After a Game 4 win, Nowitzki scored 42 points and grabbed 18 rebounds in Game 5, but could not prevent a deciding 105–87 loss.

Prior to the 2001–02 NBA season, Nowitzki signed a six-year, $90 million contract extension, which made him the second-highest-paid German athlete after Formula One champion Michael Schumacher. He continued to improve, averaging 23.4 points, 9.9 rebounds and 2.4 assists per game. Nowitzki was voted into the All-NBA Second Team and into his first All-Star Game. After making the playoffs with a 57–25 record, the Mavericks swept Kevin Garnett and the Minnesota Timberwolves in the first round; Nowitzki averaged 33.3 points per game. In the second round, the Mavericks met the Sacramento Kings and rival power forward Chris Webber. After splitting the first two games, Kings coach Rick Adelman changed his defensive scheme, assigning Hedo Türkoğlu to cover Nowitzki. Türkoğlu would use his agility to play Nowitzki tightly, and if the taller Maverick tried to post up Türkoğlu, Webber would double team Nowitzki. In Game 3 in Dallas, the Mavericks lost, 125–119; Nowitzki scored only 19 points and said: "I simply could not pass Türkoğlu, and if I did, I ran into a double team and committed too many turnovers." In Game 4, Nowitzki missed two potentially game-deciding jump shots, and the Mavericks lost, 115–113, at home. In Game 5, the Mavericks were eliminated, 114–101. However, Nowitzki received a consolation award: the Gazzetta dello Sport voted him as "European Basketballer of the Year", his 104 votes lifting him over second-placed Dejan Bodiroga (54) and Stojakovic (50).

Before the 2002–03 NBA season, Don Nelson and Mark Cuban put more emphasis on defense, specializing in a zone anchored by prolific shotblockers Raef LaFrentz and Shawn Bradley. The Mavericks won their first fourteen games, and Finley, Nash and Nowitzki were voted "Western Conference Players of the Month" in November 2002. In that season, Nowitzki lifted his averages again, now scoring 25.1 points, 9.9 rebounds and 3.0 assists per game. He led the Mavericks to a franchise-high 60–22 record, which earned them the third seed: as a result, the Mavericks had to play sixth seed Portland Trail Blazers in the 2003 NBA Playoffs. Now playing in a best-of-seven series instead of the former best-of-five, the Mavericks quickly won the first three games, but then completely lost their rhythm and the next three. In Game 7, Nowitzki hit a clutch three to make it 100–94 with 1:21 left and the Mavericks won 107–95. "This was the most important basket of my career", he later said, "I was not prepared to go on vacation that early." In the next round, the Mavericks met the Kings again, and the series went seven games. Nowitzki delivered a clutch performance in Game 7; he scored 30 points, grabbed 19 rebounds, and played strong defense, leading the Mavericks to a series-deciding 112–99 win. In the Western Conference Finals, the Mavericks met the Spurs again. In Game 3, Nowitzki went up for a rebound and Spurs guard Manu Ginóbili collided with his knee, forcing him out of the series. Without their top scorer, the Mavericks ultimately lost in six games.

After Dallas traded starting center Raef LaFrentz to Boston for forward Antoine Walker, Nelson decided to start Nowitzki at center. To cope with his more physical role, Nowitzki put on 20 lb (9.1 kg) of muscle mass over summer, sacrificed part of his agility, and put more emphasis on defense rather than scoring. Nowitzki's averages fell for the first time in his career, dropping to 21.8 points, 8.7 rebounds and 2.7 assists per game, but he still led the Mavericks in scoring, rebounding, steals (1.2 spg) and blocks (1.35 bpg). These figures earned him nominations for the All-Star Game and the All-NBA Third Team. Compiling a 52–30 record, the Mavericks met their familiar rivals the Sacramento Kings in the playoffs once again, but were eliminated in five games.

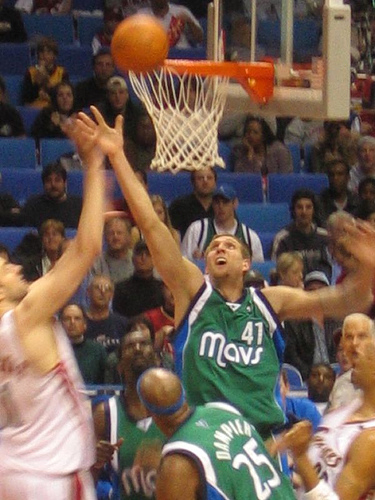
Nowitzki attempting to rebound the ball in 2005

==== Career-highs in scoring and first finals appearance (2004–2006) ====
Before the 2004–05 NBA season, the Mavericks were re-tooled again. Center Erick Dampier was acquired from the Golden State Warriors in an eight-player trade. Also, Nowitzki's close friend and fellow international teammate Steve Nash left Dallas and returned to the Phoenix Suns as a free agent, going on to win two Most Valuable Player awards with the Suns. During the season, long-time head coach Don Nelson resigned, and his assistant Avery Johnson took on head coaching duties. In the midst of these changes, Nowitzki stepped up his game and averaged 26.1 points a game (a career high) and 9.7 rebounds; and his 1.5 blocks and 3.1 assists were also career-high numbers. On December 2, 2004, Nowitzki scored 53 points in an overtime win against the Houston Rockets, a career best. Nowitzki was voted to the All-NBA First Team for the first time. He also placed third in the league's MVP voting, behind Nash and Shaquille O'Neal.

However, the Mavericks had a subpar 2005 NBA Playoffs campaign. In the first round, Dallas met Houston Rockets scoring champion Tracy McGrady and 7 ft 6 in (2.29 m) center Yao Ming. The Rockets took a 2–0 series lead before the Mavericks won three games in a row. After losing Game 6, Dallas won Game 7 convincingly and won the series even though Nowitzki struggled with his shooting. In the Western Conference Semi-finals, the Mavericks met the Phoenix Suns, the new club of Nash. They split the first four games before the Suns won the last two games. In Game 6, which the Mavericks lost in overtime, Nowitzki was not at his best: he scored 28 points, but also sank only 9 of his 25 field goal attempts and missed all five of his shots in overtime.

Prior to the 2005–06 NBA season, veteran Mavericks captain Michael Finley was waived, leaving Nowitzki as the last player remaining from the Mavericks' "Big Three" of Nash, Finley, and himself. Nowitzki averaged 26.6 points, 9.0 rebounds, and 2.8 assists during the season. Not only was this his third 2,000-point season, but his scoring average of 26.6 points was highest ever by a European. He improved his shooting percentage, setting personal season records in field goals (48.0%), three-point shots (40.6%) and free throws (90.1%). During the 2006 All-Star Weekend in Houston, Nowitzki scored 18 points to defeat Seattle SuperSonics guard Ray Allen and Washington Wizards guard Gilbert Arenas in the Three-Point Contest.

Nowitzki paced Dallas to a 60-win season. The team finished with the third-best record in the league behind the defending champion San Antonio Spurs and the defending Eastern Conference champion Detroit Pistons. As in the 2004–05 season, he finished third in the league's MVP voting, this time behind Nash and LeBron James. He was again elected to the first team All-NBA squad. Nowitzki averaged 27.0 points, 11.7 rebounds, and 2.9 assists in the playoffs. In the opening round, the Mavericks swept the Memphis Grizzlies, 4–0, with Nowitzki making a clutch three-pointer in the closing seconds of Game 3 which tied the game and forced overtime. In the Western Conference Semi-finals, the Mavericks played against the San Antonio Spurs again. After splitting the first six games, the Mavericks took a 20-point lead in Game 7 before Spur Manu Ginóbili broke a tie at 101 by hitting a 3 with 30 seconds left. On the next play, Nowitzki completed a three-point play, which tied the game at 104. In the end, the Mavericks won, 119–111, and Nowitzki ended the game with 37 points and 15 rebounds. Nowitzki commented: "I don't know how the ball went in. Manu hit my hand. It was a lucky bounce." The Mavericks advanced to the Western Conference Finals, where they again met the Suns. Nowitzki scored a playoff career high 50 points to lead the Mavericks to a victory in the crucial Game 5 with the series tied at 2; the Mavericks won the series in six games and faced the Miami Heat in the 2006 NBA Finals. A content Nowitzki commented: "We've been a good road team all season long, we believed in each other. We went through some ups and downs this season, but the playoffs are all about showing heart and playing together." Of Nowitzki's performance, ESPN columnist Bill Simmons wrote, "Dirk is playing at a higher level than any forward since [Larry] Bird."

The Mavericks took an early 2–0 Finals lead, but then gave away a late 15-point lead in a Game 3 loss. Nowitzki only made 20 of his last 55 shots in the final three games as the Mavericks lost the Finals series, 4–2, to the Heat. The German was criticized by ESPN as "clearly ... not as his best this series" and remarked: "That was a tough loss (in Game 3) and that really changed the whole momentum of the series."

==== NBA MVP and franchise record in wins (2006–2007) ====
In the 2006–07 season, Nowitzki shot a career-best 50.2% from the field, recorded averages of 24.6 points, 8.9 rebounds, and 3.4 assists, and led the Mavericks to a franchise-high 67 wins and the No. 1 seed in the Western Conference in the 2007 NBA Playoffs. He averaged 50% from the field, 40% for three-pointers, and 90% from the free-throw line, becoming (at the time) only the fifth player in NBA history to join the 50–40–90 club. Nowitzki was touted as the overwhelming favorite for the Most Valuable Player award and was expected to lead the Mavericks to an easy win against the eighth-seed Golden State Warriors, despite the Warriors having won all three regular-season meetings against Dallas. However, the Mavericks ended up losing to the Warriors in six games, marking the first time a No. 8 seed had beaten the No. 1 seed in a best-of-seven series in NBA history. In the clinching Game 6, Nowitzki shot just 2–13 from the field for only eight points. Defended by Stephen Jackson, Nowitzki averaged nearly five points less than his regular-season average in that series and shot 38.3% from the field as compared to 50.2% during the regular season. He described that loss as a low point in his career: "This series, I couldn't put my stamp on it the way I wanted to. That's why I'm very disappointed." In spite of this historic playoffs loss, Nowitzki was named the NBA's regular-season Most Valuable Player and beat his friend and back-to-back NBA MVP Nash with more than 100 votes. He also became the first European player in NBA history to receive the honor.

==== First triple-double and 20,000 points (2007–2010) ====
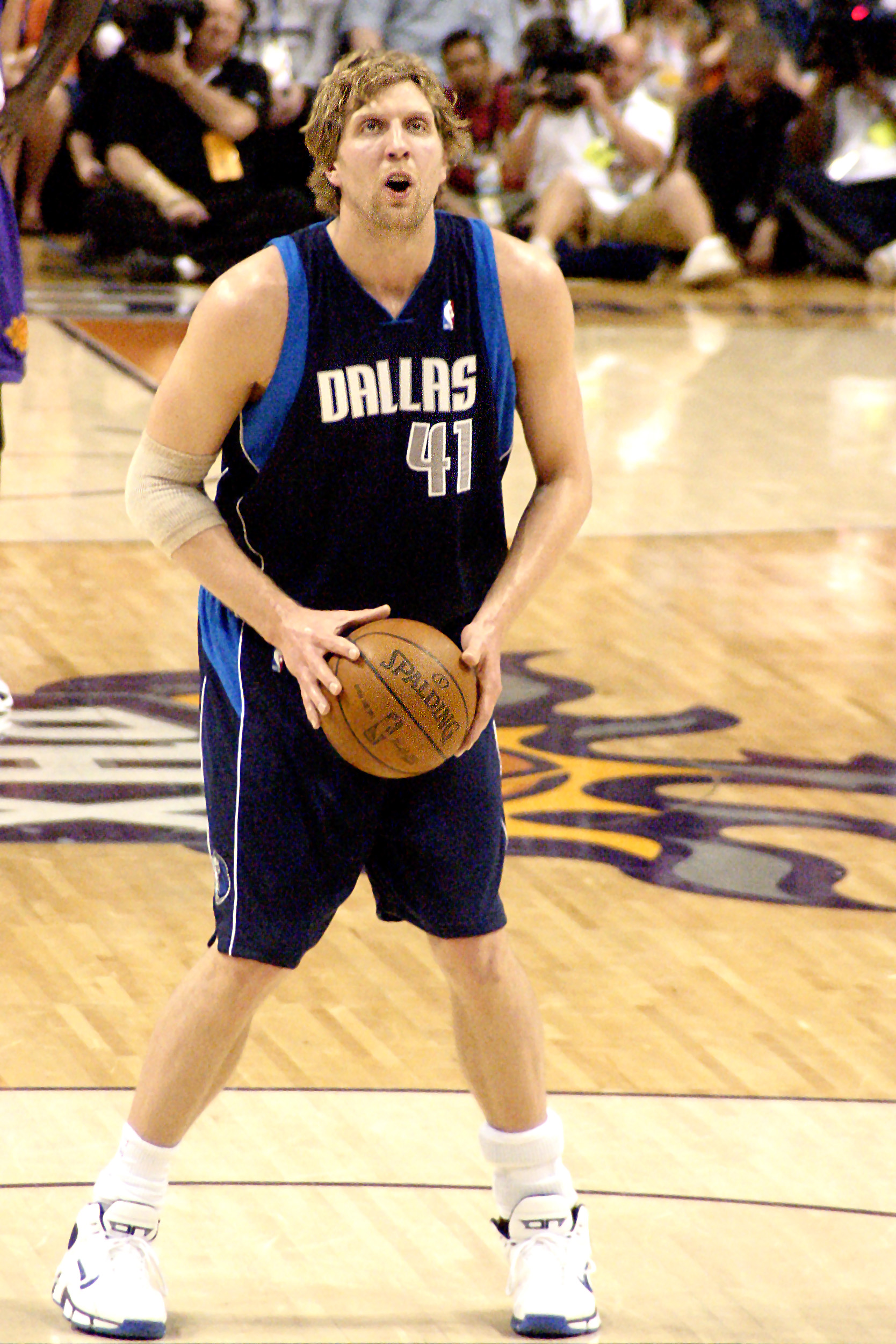
Nowitzki at the free throw line in 2008

The 2007–08 campaign saw another first-round playoff exit for Nowitzki and the Mavericks. Despite a mid-season trade that brought veteran NBA All-Star Jason Kidd to Dallas, the Mavericks finished seventh in a highly competitive Western Conference. Nowitzki averaged 23.6 points, 8.6 rebounds, and a career-high 3.5 assists for the season. In the playoffs, they faced rising star Chris Paul's New Orleans Hornets, and were eliminated in five games. The playoff loss led to the firing of Avery Johnson as head coach and the eventual hiring of Rick Carlisle. The few positive highlights that season for Nowitzki were his first career triple-double against the Milwaukee Bucks on February 6, 2008, with 29 points, 10 rebounds, and a career-high 12 assists, and on March 8, 2008 (34 points against the New Jersey Nets), when he surpassed Rolando Blackman with his 16,644th point to become the Mavericks' all-time career points leader.

The 2008–09 NBA season saw Nowitzki finish with averages of 25.9 points, 8.4 rebounds, and 2.4 assists. He was fourth in the league in scoring, and garnered his fourth All-NBA First Team selection. He also made the 2009 All-Star game, his eighth appearance. Nowitzki led Dallas to a tight finish towards the playoffs, finishing 50–32 for the season (6th in the West), after a slow 2–7 start. In the playoffs, the German led Dallas to an upset win over long-time rival San Antonio (the third seed), winning the first-round series, 4–1. The Mavericks, however, fell short against the Denver Nuggets, 4–1, in the second round, with Nowitzki averaging 34.4 points, 11.6 rebounds, and 4 assists in the series.

The Mavericks finished the 2009–10 NBA season as the second seed for the 2010 NBA Playoffs. Notable additions to the squad were multiple All-Stars Shawn Marion and Caron Butler, with the latter coming in the second half of the season. On January 13, 2010, Nowitzki became the 34th player in NBA history—and the first European—to hit the 20,000-point milestone, while ending the regular season with averages of 25 points, 7.7 rebounds, 2.7 assists, and 1 block. He was selected to the 2010 All-Star Game, his ninth appearance. The Mavericks faced off against San Antonio once more in the first round of the playoffs, but for the third time in four seasons, they failed to progress to the next round. Nowitzki became a free agent after the season, but signed a four-year, $80 million deal to remain in Dallas.

==== Championship season (2010–2011) ====
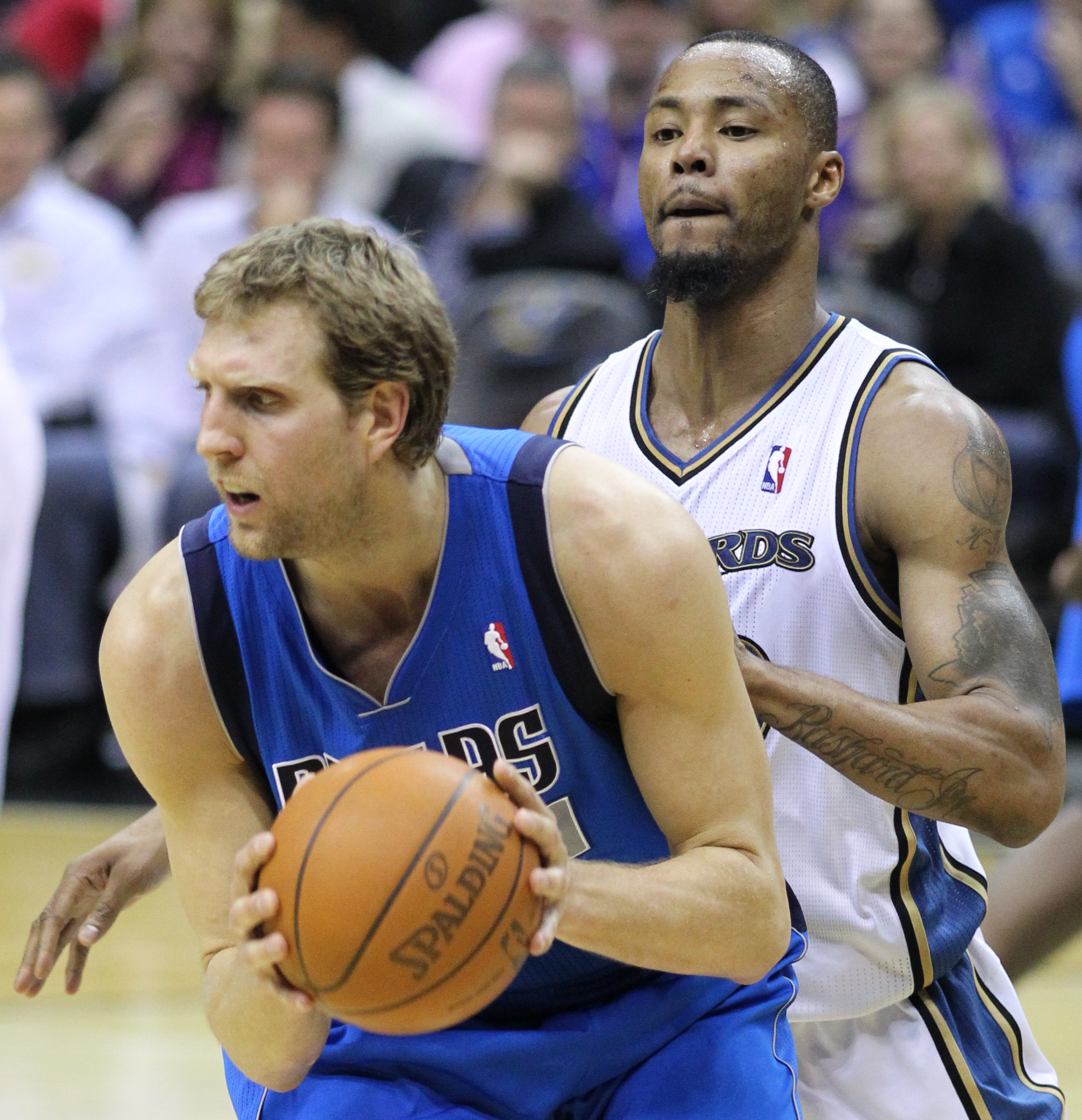
Nowitzki posting up Rashard Lewis in 2011

Prior to the 2010–11 season, the Mavericks traded for center Tyson Chandler. Nowitzki was injured in the middle of the season, but finished the regular season with averages of 23 points, 7 rebounds, and 3 assists. Despite missing nine games, Nowitzki was selected to the All-Star Game for the tenth time. The Mavericks defeated Portland in the first round of the playoffs and swept the two-time defending champion Lakers in the Conference Semifinals. In the Conference Finals, they faced the Oklahoma City Thunder and their All-NBA duo of Kevin Durant and Russell Westbrook. In Game 1, Nowitzki scored 48 points and set an NBA record of 24 consecutive free throws made in a game as well as a record for most free throws in a game without a miss. In Game 4, with Dallas leading the series 2–1, Nowitzki scored 40 points to rally his team from a 99–84 fourth-quarter deficit to a 112–105 overtime victory. Dallas won the Western Conference title in Game Five.

In the 2011 NBA Finals, Dallas once again faced the Miami Heat, which had acquired All-Stars LeBron James and Chris Bosh before the season began. During a Game 1 loss in Miami, Nowitzki tore a tendon in his left middle finger; however, MRIs were negative, and Nowitzki vowed that the injury would not be a factor. In Game 2, he led a Dallas rally from an 88–73 fourth-quarter deficit, making a driving left-handed layup over Bosh to tie the series at 1. Miami took a 2–1 series lead after Nowitzki missed a potential game-tying shot at the end of Game 3. Despite carrying a 101 °F (38 °C) fever in Game 4, he hit the winning basket to tie the series yet again at 2, evoking comparisons to Michael Jordan's "Flu Game" against Utah in the 1997 NBA Finals. Dallas went on to win the next two games, with Nowitzki scoring 10 fourth-quarter points in the series-clinching game in Miami. The championship was the first in the history of the franchise. Nowitzki was named NBA Finals Most Valuable Player.

==== Post-championship period (2011–2013) ====
As Dallas celebrated their title, the NBA was in a lockout that ended on December 8, 2011. The defending champions lost core players, such as DeShawn Stevenson, J. J. Barea, Peja Stojaković, and Tyson Chandler, while adding Lamar Odom, Delonte West, and veteran all-star Vince Carter in free agency. The Mavericks played only two preseason games, which led to a slow start for Nowitzki. Nowitzki made his 11th straight All-Star game appearance in Orlando. Nowitzki led his team in scoring 45 times during the season. Nowitzki's streak of 11 seasons with 1,500 points came to an end after scoring 1,342 in the shortened NBA season. Dallas clinched the seventh spot in the West, and were matched against the Oklahoma City Thunder in the 2012 NBA Playoffs. The Thunder swept the Mavericks in four games.

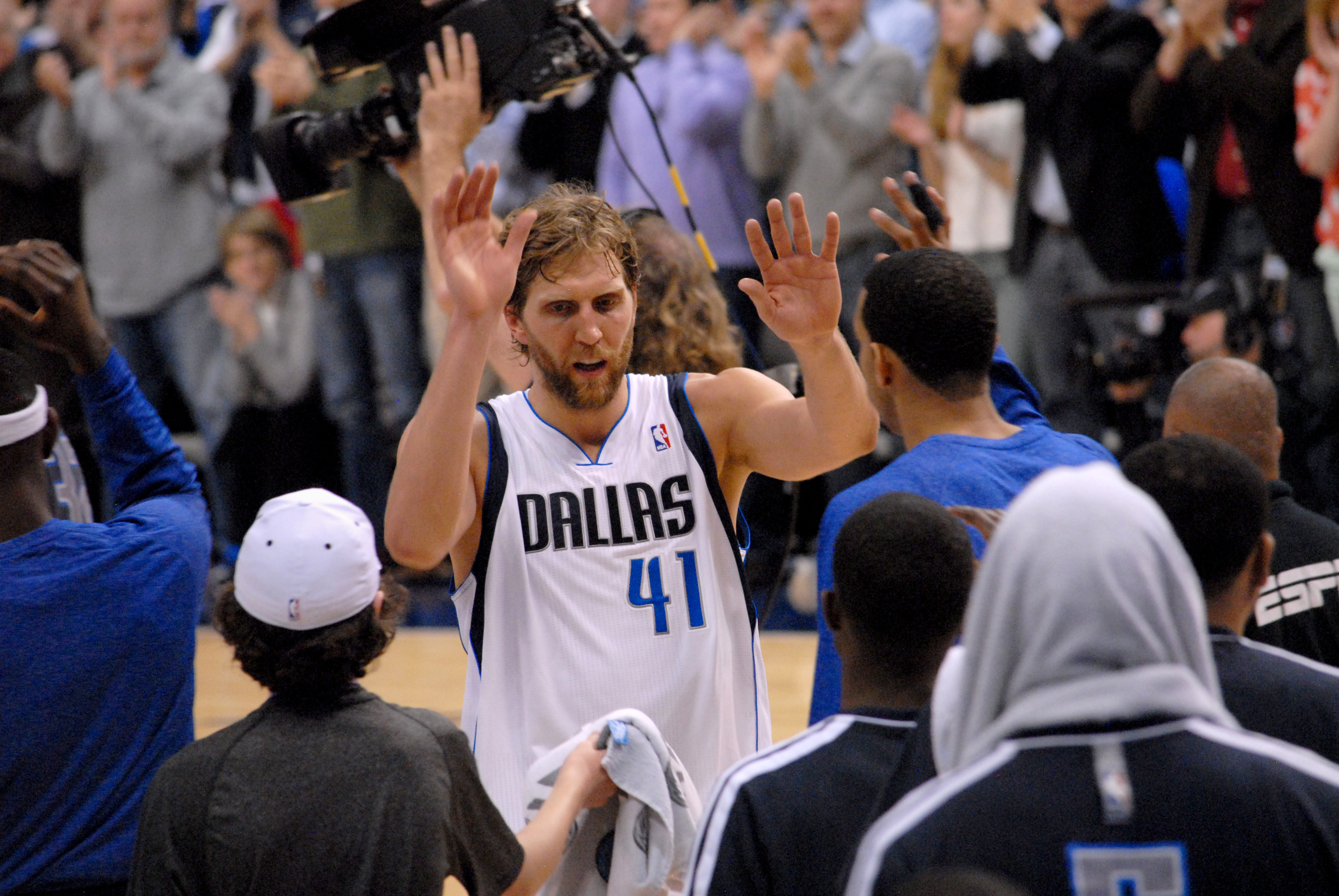
Nowitzki in 2013

Before the season, Jason Kidd and Jason Terry left the Mavericks in free agency. Nowitzki underwent knee surgery in October 2012 and missed the first 27 games of the season. He returned on December 23, 2012, in a game against San Antonio. In January 2013, Nowitzki and some of his teammates made a pact not to shave their beards until the team reached .500. They were often called "The Beard Bros." On April 14, 2013, after a fadeaway jumper in a game against the New Orleans Hornets, Nowitzki became the 17th player in NBA history to score 25,000 points. The Mavs went on to win the game and climbed back to .500 with a 40–40 record, and Nowitzki shaved his beard. However the Mavericks missed the playoffs for the first time since Nowitzki's second season, ending their 12-year playoff streak.

==== Magic Johnson Award and 10,000 rebounds (2013–2015) ====
On January 29, 2014, Nowitzki scored his 26,000th point in a 115–117 loss to the Houston Rockets. In 35 minutes of play, he recorded 38 points, 17 rebounds, and 3 assists. On March 12, 2014, in a 108–101 victory over the Utah Jazz, Nowitzki finished the game with 31 points and passed John Havlicek on the NBA scoring list with 26,426 points. On April 8, 2014, Nowitzki scored his 26,712th point, passing Oscar Robertson to move to the 10th position on the all-time scoring list. Nowitzki led the Mavericks back to the playoffs where they faced their in-state rival San Antonio Spurs in the first round. The Mavericks lost the series in seven games, despite taking a 2–1 series lead.

On July 15, 2014, Nowitzki re-signed with the Mavericks to a reported three-year, $25 million contract. He was also reunited with former championship teammate Tyson Chandler, who was traded to Dallas after a three-year stint with New York. However, longtime teammate Shawn Marion signed with the Cleveland Cavaliers before the season.

On November 11, 2014, Nowitzki scored 23 points to surpass Hakeem Olajuwon as the highest-scoring player born outside the United States, as the Mavericks came from 24 points down to defeat Sacramento, 106–98. Nowitzki hit a jumper from just inside the three-point line early in the fourth quarter to pass Olajuwon at No. 9, and he finished the night at 26,953 career points. Six days later, Nowitzki became the fourth player in NBA history to eclipse 27,000 career points with the same franchise, joining Michael Jordan, Karl Malone and Kobe Bryant. On December 26 against the Los Angeles Lakers, Nowitzki passed Elvin Hayes for eighth place on the NBA's all-time scoring list. He went on to pass Moses Malone for seventh place on the NBA's all-time scoring list on January 5, 2015, in a 96–88 overtime win over the Brooklyn Nets. He recorded his 10,000th career rebound on March 24 against the San Antonio Spurs, and scored his 28,000th career point on April 1 against the Oklahoma City Thunder.

The Mavericks finished the regular season as the No. 7 seed in the Western Conference with a record of 50–32. They faced the Houston Rockets in the first round of the playoffs and lost the series in five games.

==== Final playoff appearance and 30,000 points (2015–2017) ====
On November 11, 2015, Nowitzki scored a season-high 31 points in a 118–108 win over the Los Angeles Clippers. He also grabbed a team-high 11 rebounds and passed former teammate Shawn Marion for 15th on the all-time career rebounding list. On December 23, Nowitzki moved past Shaquille O'Neal into sixth place on the NBA's career scoring list, then made the go-ahead basket with 19.2 seconds left in overtime to help the Mavericks defeat the Brooklyn Nets, 119–118. On February 21, he scored 18 points against the Philadelphia 76ers, becoming the sixth player in NBA history to reach 29,000 career points. On March 20, he set a new season high with 40 points in a 132–120 overtime win over the Portland Trail Blazers. His 20th career 40-point game was his first since January 2014, and the first by a 37-year-old since Karl Malone in 2000–01.

In Game 4 of the Mavericks' first-round playoff series against the Oklahoma City Thunder, Nowitzki passed Elgin Baylor (3,623 points) for 15th on the NBA's career playoff scoring list. The Mavericks lost the series four games to one.

On July 27, 2016, Nowitzki re-signed with the Mavericks. Nowitzki missed several games early in the season with Achilles tendon problems. On March 7, 2017, in a 122–111 win over the Los Angeles Lakers, Nowitzki became the sixth player in NBA history to score 30,000 regular-season points. He also became the first international player to reach the milestone and one of only three to score all 30,000-plus with one team—the others being Karl Malone (Utah Jazz) and Kobe Bryant (L.A. Lakers). The Mavericks finished the season with a 33–49 record and missed the NBA Playoffs.

Following the 2016–17 season, Nowitzki exercised his player option to become a free agent; this move allowed the Mavericks to re-sign him with less money and be able to pursue other free agents.

==== Final seasons (2017–2019) ====
On July 6, 2017, Nowitzki re-signed with the Mavericks on a two-year, $10 million contract (with a team option on the second year). On February 5, 2018, in a 104–101 loss to the Los Angeles Clippers, Nowitzki became the sixth player in NBA history to reach 50,000 career minutes. On February 28, 2018, in a 111–110 overtime loss to the Oklahoma City Thunder, Nowitzki reached 31,000 career points. On March 17, 2018, in a 114–106 loss to the Brooklyn Nets, Nowitzki played in his 1,463rd game, moving past Kevin Garnett into fifth place in the NBA career list. He had season-ending ankle surgery on April 5 after appearing in 77 of the first 78 games. The Mavericks finished the season with a 24–58 record and missed the NBA Playoffs.

On July 23, 2018, Nowitzki re-signed with the Mavericks for the 2018–19 season. With his season debut on December 13, 2018, he set the NBA record for the most seasons played with the same team (21), breaking a tie with Kobe Bryant, who spent 20 seasons with the Lakers. He also became the fifth player in NBA history to play 21 seasons, tying an NBA record. Nowitzki was named to his 14th All-Star game as a special team roster addition. On March 18, 2019, Nowitzki became the sixth-highest scoring player of all time, surpassing Wilt Chamberlain's 31,419 points in a loss to the New Orleans Pelicans. In his team's final home game of the season, a 120–109 victory over the Phoenix Suns on April 9, Nowitzki scored 30 points, and announced his retirement in an emotional ceremony during which Charles Barkley, Larry Bird, Shawn Kemp, Scottie Pippen, and Detlef Schrempf appeared on the court to give laudatory speeches for Nowitzki. One day later, he played his final NBA game, recording a double-double with 20 points and 10 rebounds in a 105–94 loss to the Spurs.

== National team career ==
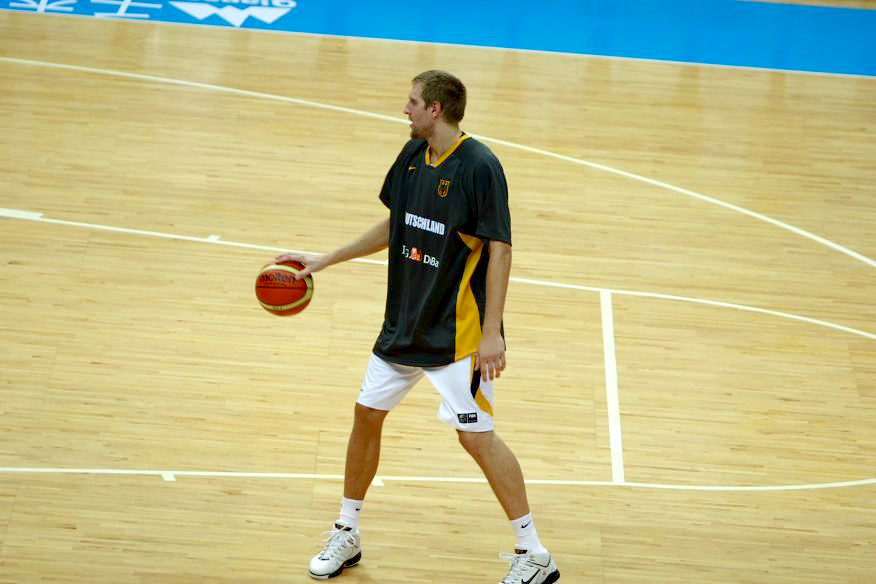
Nowitzki played for the German national basketball team from 1997 to 2015.

Nowitzki began playing for the German national basketball team in 1997. In his debut tournament, the EuroBasket 1999, the 21-year-old rookie emerged as the main German scorer, but Germany finished seventh and failed to qualify for the 2000 Olympic Games. In the EuroBasket 2001, Nowitzki was top scorer with 28.7 points per game, and narrowly lost the MVP vote to Serbian player Peja Stojaković. Germany reached the semi-finals and were close to beating host nation Turkey, but Hedo Türkoğlu hit a three-point buzzer beater to tie it, and the Turks eventually won in overtime. Germany then lost, 99–90, against Spain, and did not win a medal. However, with averages of 28.7 points and 9.1 rebounds, Nowitzki led the tournament in both statistics, and was voted to the All-Star team. Back home, the German basketball team attracted up to 3.7 million television viewers, a German basketball record at the time.

Nowitzki earned his first medal when he led Germany to a bronze medal in the 2002 FIBA World Championship. In the quarter-finals against the Pau Gasol-led Spain, Spain was up 52–46 after three-quarters, but then Nowitzki scored 10 points in the last quarter and led Germany to a 70–62 win. In the semi-finals, his team played against the Argentinian team led by Manu Ginóbili, but despite leading, 74–69, four minutes from the end and despite Argentina losing Ginobili to a foot injury, the South Americans won, 86–80. However, the Germans won 117–94 against New Zealand in the consolation finals and won bronze, and Nowitzki, as the tournament's top scorer, (24.0 points per game), was elected the tournament MVP. Back in Germany, over four million television viewers followed the games, an all-time record in German basketball history.

In a preparation game for EuroBasket 2003, Nowitzki suffered a foot injury after a collision with French player Florent Piétrus; as a result, Nowitzki played inconsistently and was also often target of hard fouls. In the decisive second-round match against Italy (only the winner was allowed to play the medal round), Germany lost, 86–84, finished ninth and did not qualify for the 2004 Olympic Games. Nowitzki scored 22.5 points per game (third overall), but in general seemed to lack focus and dominance due to his injury.

In the EuroBasket 2005, Nowitzki led a depleted German squad into the Finals, beating title favorites Slovenia in the quarter-finals and Spain in the semi-finals on the way. EuroBasket pundits praised Nowitzki in both matches: against Slovenia (76–62), the forward scored a game-high 22 points and commented: "The Slovenians underestimated us. They said we were the team they wanted and that was wrong, you shouldn't do that in the quarter-finals." Against Spain (74–73), Nowitzki scored a game-high 27 points and scored the decisive basket: down by one and with only a few seconds to go, he drove on Spanish forward Jorge Garbajosa, and hit a baseline jump shot over Garbajosa's outstretched arms with 3.9 seconds to go. The German later commented: "It was indescribable. Garbajosa kind of pushed me towards the baseline so I just went with it." Despite losing the Finals, 78–62, to the Greeks, Nowitzki was the tournament's leading scorer (26.1 per game), and second-leading rebounder (10.6 per game), and shot blocker (1.9 per game), and he was also voted the Most Valuable Player of the tournament. When he was subbed out towards the end of the final, Nowitzki received a standing ovation from the crowd, which he later recalled as "one of the best moments of [his] career". The German team was awarded a silver medal.

In the 2006 FIBA World Championship, Nowitzki led the German team to an eighth place and commented: "It's tough luck. But overall, finishing eighth in the world is not bad."

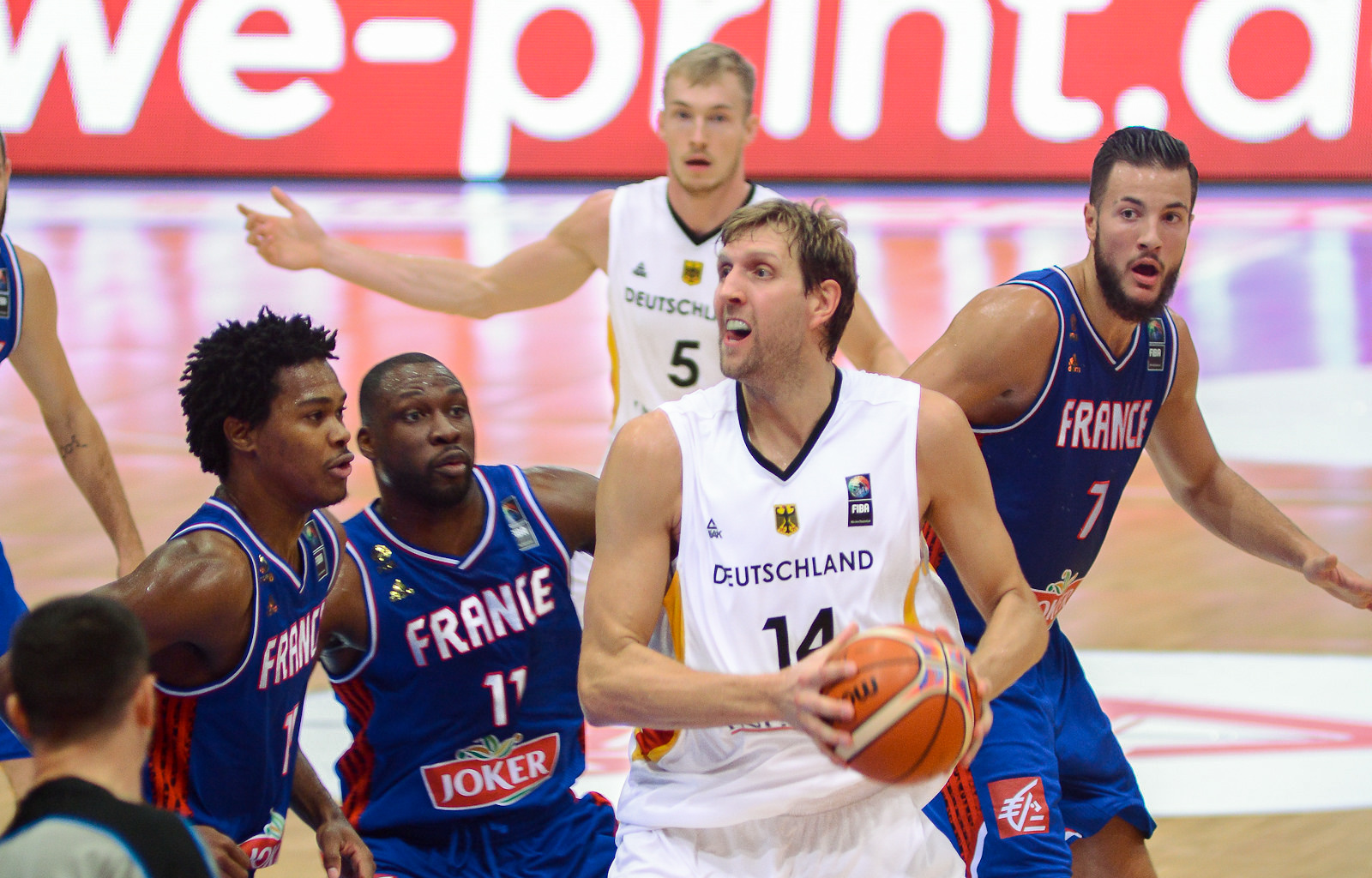
Nowitzki playing for Germany in 2015

In the EuroBasket 2007, in which the top three teams automatically qualified for the 2008 Olympics, Nowitzki led Germany to a fifth place. He was the leading scorer with 24.0 points per game. The fifth place meant that Germany fell short of direct qualification, but was allowed to participate in the 2008 Olympic Qualifying Tournament. Nowitzki led Germany into a decisive match against Puerto Rico for the last remaining slot. In that crucial match, he scored a game-high 32 points and was vital for the 96–82 win which sent the German basketball team to their first Olympics since the 1992 Summer Olympics. Nowitzki was chosen to be the flag bearer for the German Olympic Team at the Opening Ceremony for the 2008 Olympics. Nowitzki led the German team to a tenth-place finish, and averaged 17.0 points and 8.4 rebounds for the tournament.

In 2009, Nowitzki skipped the EuroBasket 2009. In July 2010, he said that he would skip the 2010 FIBA World Championship. In summer 2011, Nowitzki played with Germany in the EuroBasket 2011, where the team reached ninth place. In 2015, Nowitzki captained Germany at the EuroBasket. They won only one game, and were eliminated in the group stage, on home soil. In January 2016, Nowitzki officially announced his retirement from Germany's national team. In his career with Germany's senior men's national team, he averaged 19.7 points, 7.5 rebounds, and 1.6 assists per game.

Nowitzki was named the Euroscar European Basketball Player of the Year by the Italian sports newspaper Gazzetta dello Sport for five years running from 2002 to 2006 and again in 2011. He was also named the Mister Europa European Player of the Year by the Italian sports magazine Superbasket in 2005, and the FIBA Europe Men's Player of the Year twice in 2005 and 2011. He was named to the FIBA EuroBasket 2000–2020 Dream Team in 2020.

The German Basketball Federation (DBB) honored Nowitzki with a jersey (number 14) (Note: FIBA only allowed player numbers between 4 and 15 for international matches until 2018, after Nowitzki had retired from international play.) retirement in September 2022, ahead of EuroBasket 2022. The ceremony was held on September 2, immediately before Germany's EuroBasket opening game against France in Cologne. DBB also announced that a replica of Nowitzki's national team jersey would hang from the arena rafters at all future Germany men's home games.

== Player profile ==
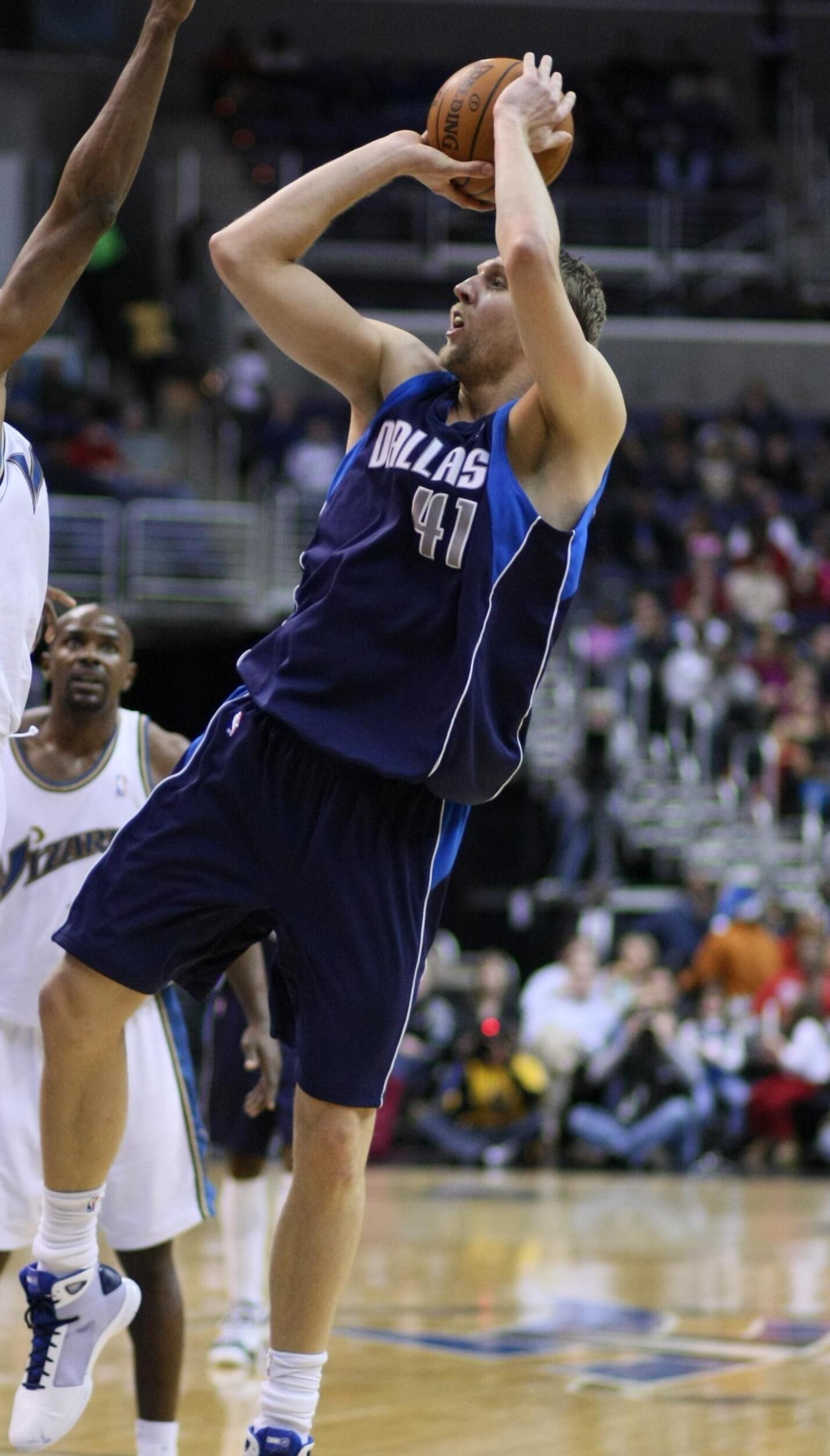
Nowitzki shooting his signature fadeaway jump shot

Nowitzki was a versatile frontcourt player who mostly played the power forward, but also played center and small forward in his career. An exceptional shooter for his size, Nowitzki made 88% of his free throws, nearly 50% of his field goal attempts and nearly 40% of his 3-point shots, and won the 2006 NBA All-Star Three-Point Contest. In the 2006–07 season, Nowitzki became only the fifth member of the NBA's 50–40–90 Club for players who shot 50% or better from the field, 40% or better on three-pointers, and 90% or better on free-throws in a single season while achieving the NBA league minimum number of makes in each category.

Nowitzki's shooting accuracy, combined with his long seven-foot frame and unique shooting mechanics (such as having a release point above his head), made his jump shots difficult to contest. Before the start of the 2011 NBA Finals, LeBron James called Nowitzki's one-legged fadeaway the second most unstoppable move ever, behind only Kareem Abdul-Jabbar's skyhook. Additionally, Nowitzki could drive to the basket from the perimeter like few men his size were able to do. NBA.com lauded his versatility by stating: "The 7–0 forward who at times mans the pivot can strike fear in an opponent when he corrals a rebound and leads the break or prepares to launch a three-point bomb." Charles Barkley said the best way to guard Nowitzki was to "get a cigarette and a blindfold". Later on in his career, Nowitzki also developed an unorthodox post-up game, often backing down his opponents from the free-throw line or near the middle of the key, opening up the floor for multiple passing angles should a double team come his way. In 2022, to commemorate the NBA's 75th Anniversary The Athletic ranked their top 75 players of all time, and named Nowitzki as the 21st greatest player in NBA history.

Nowitzki was the sixth player in NBA history, and the first European, to hit the 30,000-point milestone. Apart from being the Mavericks' all-time leader in points, rebounds, field goals, field goal attempts, 3-pointers, 3-point attempts, blocks, free throws, and free-throw attempts, Nowitzki made the NBA All-Star games fourteen times and the All-NBA Teams twelve times. He was voted NBA MVP of the 2006–07 NBA season, becoming the first European player to receive the honor, as well as the MVP of the 2011 NBA Finals. Other achievements include winning the 2006 Three-Point Contest and the 2017 NBA Teammate of the Year award, being voted European Basketballer of the Year five times in a row by La Gazzetta dello Sport. He was the leading scorer and MVP of the 2002 FIBA World Championship, and EuroBasket 2005 tournaments.

== NBA career statistics ==
Legend
GP	Games played	GS	Games started	MPG	Minutes per game
FG%	Field goal percentage	3P%	3-point field goal percentage	FT%	Free throw percentage
RPG	Rebounds per game	APG	Assists per game	SPG	Steals per game
BPG	Blocks per game	PPG	Points per game	**Bold**	Career high
†	Won an NBA championship	*	Led the league

=== Regular season ===
Year	Team	GP	GS	MPG	FG%	3P%	FT%	RPG	APG	SPG	BPG	PPG
1998–99	Dallas	47	24	20.4	.405	.206	.773	3.4	1.0	.6	.6	8.2
1999–00	Dallas	**82**	81	35.8	.461	.379	.830	6.5	2.5	.8	.8	17.5
2000–01	Dallas	**82**	**82***	38.1	.474	.387	.838	9.2	2.1	1.0	1.2	21.8
2001–02	Dallas	76	76	38.0	.477	.397	.853	**9.9**	2.4	1.1	1.0	23.4
2002–03	Dallas	80	80	**39.0**	.463	.379	.881	**9.9**	3.0	**1.4**	1.0	25.1
2003–04	Dallas	77	77	37.9	.462	.341	.877	8.7	2.7	1.2	1.4	21.8
2004–05	Dallas	78	78	38.7	.459	.399	.869	9.7	3.1	1.2	**1.5**	26.1
2005–06	Dallas	81	81	38.1	.480	.406	.901	9.0	2.8	.7	1.0	**26.6**
2006–07	Dallas	78	78	36.2	.502	.416	.904	8.9	3.4	.7	.8	24.6
2007–08	Dallas	77	77	36.0	.479	.359	.879	8.6	**3.5**	.7	.9	23.6
2008–09	Dallas	81	81	37.7	.479	.359	.890	8.4	2.4	.8	.8	25.9
2009–10	Dallas	81	80	37.5	.481	**.421**	**.915**	7.7	2.7	.9	1.0	25.0
2010–11†	Dallas	73	73	34.3	.**517**	.393	.892	7.0	2.6	.5	.6	23.0
2011–12	Dallas	62	62	33.5	.457	.368	.896	6.8	2.2	.7	.5	21.6
2012–13	Dallas	53	47	31.3	.471	.414	.860	6.8	2.5	.7	.7	17.3
2013–14	Dallas	80	80	32.9	.497	.398	.899	6.2	2.7	.9	.6	21.7
2014–15	Dallas	77	77	29.6	.459	.380	.882	5.9	1.9	.5	.4	17.3
2015–16	Dallas	75	75	31.5	.448	.368	.893	6.5	1.8	.7	.7	18.3
2016–17	Dallas	54	54	26.4	.437	.378	.875	6.5	1.5	.6	.7	14.2
2017–18	Dallas	77	77	24.7	.456	.409	.898	5.7	1.6	.6	.6	12.0
2018–19	Dallas	51	20	15.6	.359	.312	.780	3.1	.7	.2	.4	7.3
Career		1,522	1,460	33.8	.471	.380	.879	7.5	2.4	.8	.8	20.7
All-Star		14	2	16.2	.450	.290	.875	3.7	1.1	.7	.4	8.7

=== Playoffs ===
Year	Team	GP	GS	MPG	FG%	3P%	FT%	RPG	APG	SPG	BPG	PPG
2001	Dallas	10	10	39.9	.423	.283	.883	8.1	1.4	1.1	.8	23.4
2002	Dallas	8	8	**44.6**	.445	**.571**	.878	**13.1**	2.3	**2.0**	.8	**28.4**
2003	Dallas	17	17	42.5	.479	.443	.912	11.5	2.2	1.2	.9	25.3
2004	Dallas	5	5	42.4	.450	.467	.857	11.8	1.4	1.4	**2.6**	26.6
2005	Dallas	13	13	42.4	.402	.333	.829	10.1	3.3	1.4	1.6	23.7
2006	Dallas	**23**	**23**	42.7	.468	.343	.895	11.7	2.9	1.1	.6	27.0
2007	Dallas	6	6	39.8	.383	.211	.840	11.3	2.3	1.8	1.3	19.7
2008	Dallas	5	5	42.2	.473	.333	.808	12.0	**4.0**	.2	1.4	26.8
2009	Dallas	10	10	39.5	.518	.286	.925	10.1	3.1	.9	.8	26.8
2010	Dallas	6	6	38.8	**.547**	**.571**	**.952**	8.2	3.0	.8	.7	26.7
2011†	Dallas	21	21	39.3	.485	.460	.941	8.1	2.5	.6	.6	27.7
2012	Dallas	4	4	38.5	.442	.167	.905	6.3	1.8	.8	.0	26.8
2014	Dallas	7	7	37.6	.429	.083	.806	8.0	1.6	.9	.9	19.1
2015	Dallas	5	5	36.2	.452	.235	.929	10.2	2.4	.4	.4	21.2
2016	Dallas	5	5	34.0	.494	.364	.941	5.0	1.6	.4	.6	20.4
Career		145	145	40.7	.462	.365	.892	10.0	2.5	1.0	.9	25.3

== Career highlights ==
NBA

- NBA champion: 2011
- NBA Finals MVP: 2011
- NBA Most Valuable Player: 2007
- 14× NBA All-Star: 2002–2012, 2014–2015, 2019
- 12× All-NBA Team: 2001–2012
  - 4× First Team: 2005–2007, 2009
  - 5× Second Team: 2002–2003, 2008, 2010–2011
  - 3× Third Team: 2001, 2004, 2012
- NBA Three-Point Contest champion: 2006
- NBA Shooting Stars champion: 2010
- NBA Teammate of the Year: 2017
- Magic Johnson Award: 2014
- All-Time NBA European First Team: 2022
- Ranked 6th in all-time-scoring
- Ranked 5th in all-time defensive-rebounds
- Ranked 2nd in all-time NBA Finals free throw percentage
- 82 consecutive free throws made in the regular season (the third-longest streak of all time)
- 26 consecutive free throws made in the Finals (longest streak of all time)
- One of three players with at least 30,000 points, 10,000 rebounds, 3,000 assists, 1,000 steals and 1,000 blocks
- One of two players with 150 three-pointers and 100 blocks in a single season: 2001
- One of four players with an NBA Playoff career average of 25 ppg and 10 rpg (25.3 ppg, 10.0 rpg)
- One of eight members of the 50–40–90 club: 2007
- One of three players to surpass the mark of 1,000 in both three-pointers and blocks for the career
- One of four players to surpass the marks of 30,000 in points and 10,000 in rebounds for the career
- Holds the record for most free-throws made in a single playoff season with 205 free-throws made: 2006
- Dallas Mavericks all-time statistical leader in games, seasons, points, rebounds, blocks, field goals, three-point field goals and free throws
- NBA record for most seasons with one team (21) and games played in a career spent with only one team (1,522)

German national basketball team

- 2002 FIBA World Championship: bronze medal, MVP, top scorer, all-tournament team
- EuroBasket 2005: silver medal, MVP, top scorer, all-tournament team
- 2006 FIBA World Championship, EuroBasket 2001, EuroBasket 2007: top scorer, all-tournament team
- Goldener Ehrenring (golden honorary ring) of the DBB (German Basketball Federation): 2007
- FIBA EuroBasket 2000–2020 Dream Team:
- Third leading scorer (1,052 points) in the history of EuroBasket
- Leading scorer in the history of the senior German national basketball team (3,045 points in 153 international games)
- Member of the German national basketball team which was voted Outstanding German Team of the Year: 2005

Other achievements and highlights

- German League MVP: 1999
- German League Top Scorer: 1999
- 6× Euroscar: 2002–2006, 2011
- 2× FIBA Europe Men's Player of the Year: 2005, 2011
- Mr. Europa: 2005
- 5× All-Europeans Player of the Year: 2005–2008, 2011
- German national flag bearer at the 2008 Summer Olympics in Beijing, China
- Best NBA Player ESPY Award: 2011
- Best Male Athlete ESPY Award: 2011
- Outstanding Team ESPY Award with the Dallas Mavericks: 2011
- Sports Illustrated NBA All-Decade Second Team (2000–2009)
- Silbernes Lorbeerblatt: 2011
- German Sports Personality of the Year: 2011
- Naismith Legacy Award: 2012
- Magic Johnson Award: 2014
- Laureus Lifetime Achievement Award: 2020

== Personal life ==
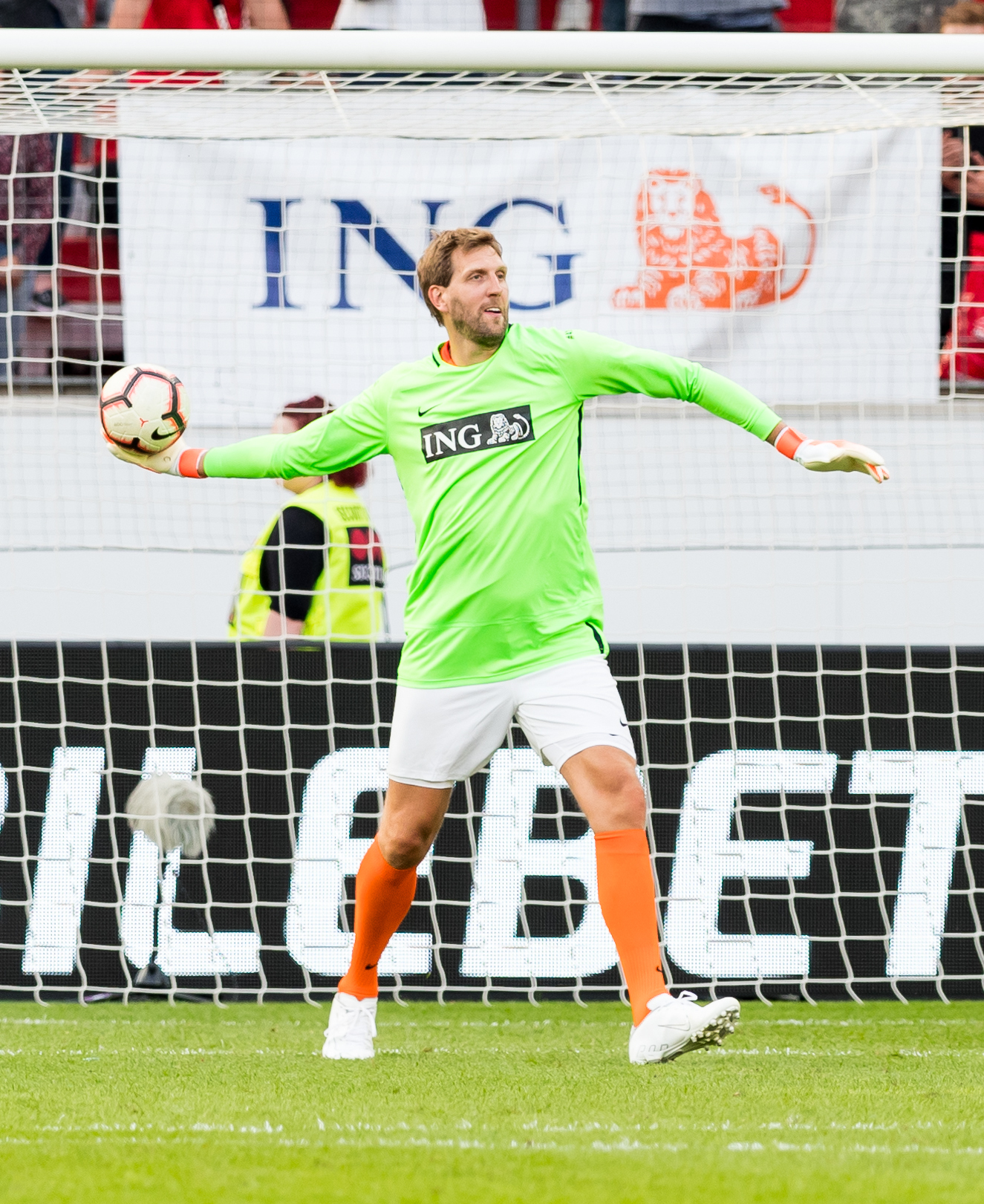
Nowitzki throwing the ball as the goalkeeper during an association football charity match

Nowitzki's older sister, Silke Nowitzki, described Dirk as a confident but low-key character, unspoiled by money and fame. Nowitzki is noted for taking significant pay cuts throughout his career, having passed on $194 million to keep the Mavericks competitive during his tenure with the team. He notably passed on a four-year, $97 million max offer in 2014 from the Los Angeles Lakers and Houston Rockets to stay with the Mavericks on a three-year, $25 million deal. He enjoys reading and playing the saxophone. Nowitzki passed his Abitur examination at Röntgen Gymnasium Grammar School of Würzburg. He founded the Dirk Nowitzki Foundation, a charity which aims at fighting poverty in Africa.

Nowitzki dated Sybille Gerer, a female basketball player from his local club DJK Würzburg. The relationship started in 1992 and lasted for 10 years before it ended in 2002; Nowitzki said, "At the end, we found out we developed in separate ways. ... It did not work anymore, but we are still good friends." He added: "I surely want to start a family and have kids, but I cannot imagine it happening before I become 30."

In 2010, Nowitzki met and began dating Jessica Olsson, sister of twin footballers Martin Olsson and Marcus Olsson. The couple got married on July 20, 2012, at Nowitzki's home in Dallas. They have a daughter, born in July 2013 and two sons, born in March 2015 and November 2016. Though Nowitzki has considered acquiring U.S. citizenship, he remains a German national. In 2021 he received the green card.

Nowitzki acknowledged close ties to his mentor Holger Geschwindner, whom he called his best friend. He is also good friends with his ex-teammate Steve Nash. Nash said of playing with Nowitzki, "We were both joining a new club, living in a new city, we were both single and outsiders: this creates a bond ... He made life easier for me and I for him ... Our friendship was something solid in a very volatile world." Nowitzki added, "He would have also become a good friend if we had met at the supermarket."

Nowitzki is a keen association football fan and an avid supporter of Arsenal F.C.

== Books ==
Nowitzki's career has been chronicled in books. Dirk Nowitzki: German Wunderkind, written by German sports journalists Dino Reisner and Holger Sauer, was published in 2004 by CoPress Munich. The 160-page hardcover book follows Nowitzki's beginnings in his native Würzburg, documents his entry into and ascent within the NBA, and ends at the beginning of the 2004–05 NBA season.

In November 2011, the Würzburg local newspaper Main-Post published a 216-page book written by its sports journalists Jürgen Höpfl and Fabian Frühwirth: Einfach Er – Dirk Nowitzki – Aus Würzburg an die Weltspitze, (Just Him – Dirk Nowitzki – From Würzburg to the Top of the World). Both Höpfl and Frühwirth accompanied Nowitzki throughout his career, collecting interviews and photos used in the book. It looks back on the 2011 NBA Finals but also has a strong focus on Nowitzki's relation to his hometown Würzburg and his career progression which began there. The book features insights from former coaches, family members, and friends.

In 2019, Thomas Pletzinger published the 502-page biography The Great Nowitzki, for which he had followed Nowitzki over several years. Reviewers praised the book for its writing style, narrative approach, and literary quality.

== In popular culture ==
In 2014, the film documentary Nowitzki. The Perfect Shot was released, which retells Nowitzki's career and life.

== Honors ==
On October 30, 2019, by a unanimous resolution of the Dallas City Council, part of Olive Street was renamed Nowitzki Way, which runs past the American Airlines Center. In December 2019, Nowitzki received the Order of Merit of the Federal Republic of Germany from Federal President Frank-Walter Steinmeier, in recognition of his social commitment.

On January 5, 2022, Nowitzki's number 41 was retired by the Mavericks. The same night, Mark Cuban unveiled the design for a statue of Nowitzki that was planned to be installed outside the American Airlines Center in Dallas. The statue was unveiled on Christmas Day later that year.

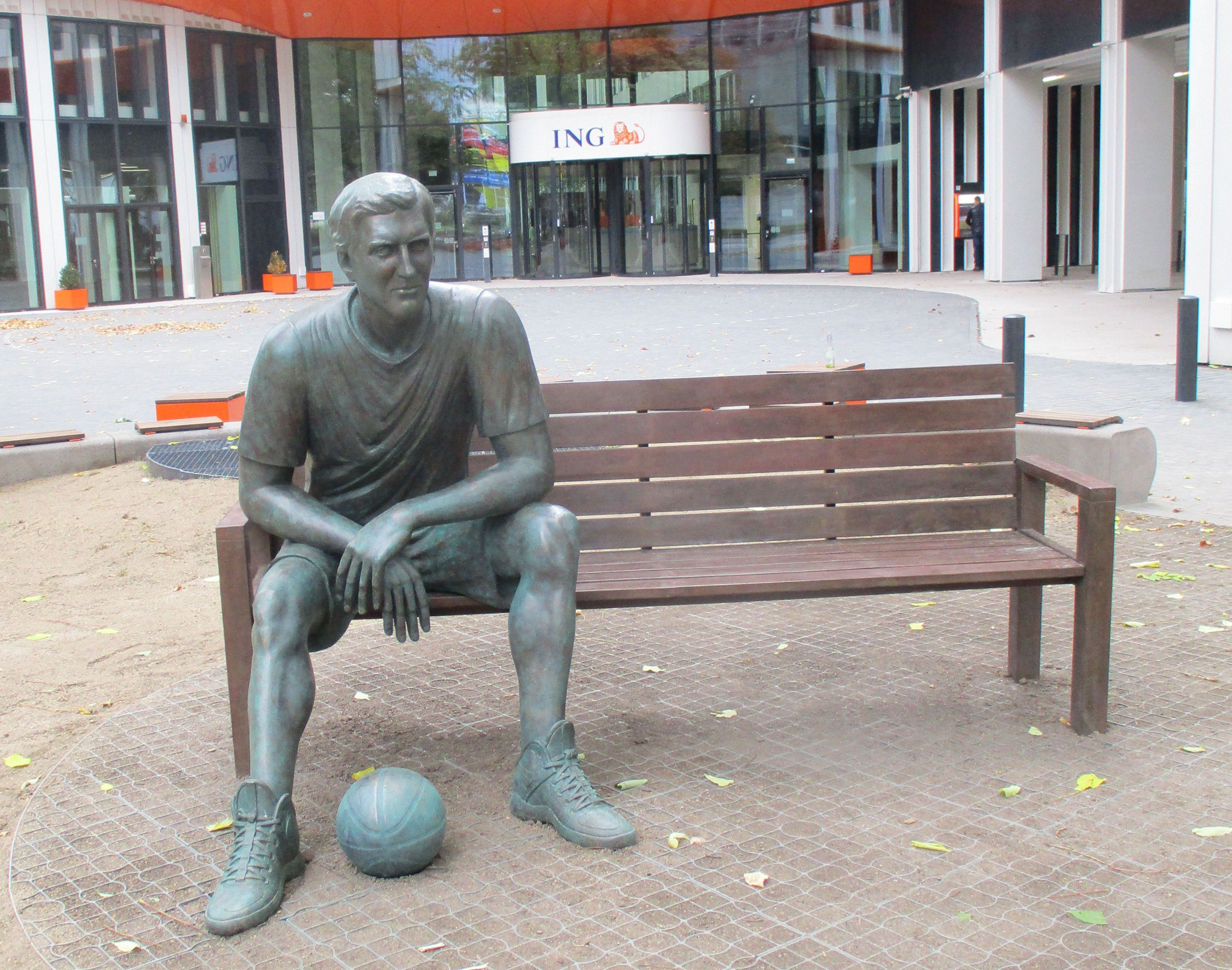
Dirk Nowitzki statue in Frankfurt

A different Dirk Nowitzki statue in Frankfurt was unveiled on October 12, 2023, in recognition of Nowitzki's long-term advertising activities by the CEO of the ING Germany in the presence of Nowitzki in Frankfurt. The statue made by the sculptor Andreas Artur Hoferick of bronze, slightly over life size, shows Nowitzki sitting on a wooden bench on one side. The position on the bench is said to invite passersby to take space next to the athlete.

In 2025, Nowitzki was inducted into the Germany's Sports Hall of Fame.

== See also ==
- List of NBA career games played leaders
- List of NBA career scoring leaders
- List of NBA career rebounding leaders
- List of NBA career 3-point scoring leaders
- List of NBA career personal fouls leaders
- List of NBA career free throw percentage leaders
- List of NBA career free throw scoring leaders
- List of NBA career minutes played leaders
- List of NBA career playoff scoring leaders
- List of NBA career playoff rebounding leaders
- List of NBA career playoff free throw scoring leaders
- List of NBA single-game steals leaders
- List of NBA single-game playoff scoring leaders
- List of NBA franchise career scoring leaders
- List of NBA seasons played leaders
- List of European basketball players in the United States

== Footnotes ==
Awards and achievements
Preceded by Kobe Bryant	Best NBA Player ESPY Award; 2011	Succeeded by LeBron James
Preceded by Sebastian Vettel	German Sports Personality of the Year; 2011	Succeeded by Robert Harting
Olympic Games
Preceded by Ludger Beerbaum	Flagbearer for Germany; Beijing 2008	Succeeded by Natascha Keller
