= Holger Geschwindner =

German basketball player (born 1945)

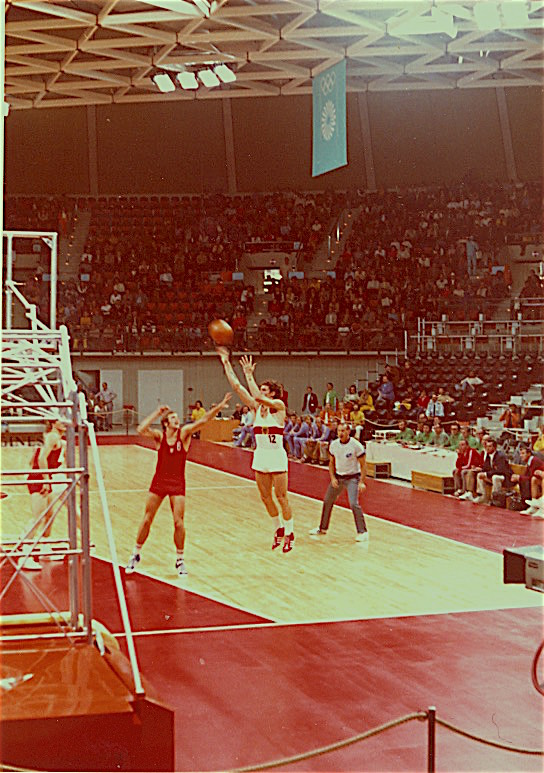
Geschwindner taking a jump shot for the West German national team during the 1972 Summer Olympics

Holger Geschwindner (born 9 December 1945 in Bad Nauheim, Hessen) is a German former professional basketball player. He is known as the long-time coach and mentor of ex-Dallas Mavericks player Dirk Nowitzki. Geschwindner first met Nowitzki when the future basketball superstar was 16 years old.

Geschwindner acted as an official coach of the Dallas Mavericks and runs a basketball academy in Würzburg, Germany, that he calls the Institute of Applied Nonsense. In 1995, Geschwindner calculated the optimum angle of a jump shot to be 60 degrees.

== Early life ==
A native of Würzburg, Geschwindner is alleged to have learned basketball as a young boy from an American soldier, Ernie Butler, stationed in Germany.
