= Fadeaway =

Basketball technique

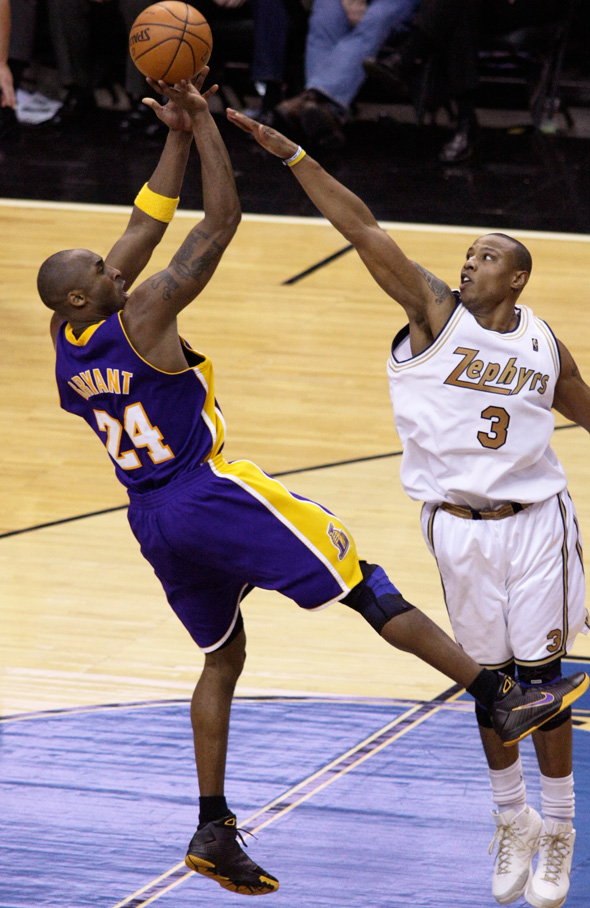
Kobe Bryant shoots a fadeaway over Caron Butler.

A fadeaway, or fall-away, in basketball is a jump shot taken while jumping backwards, away from the basket. The goal is to create space between the shooter and the defender, making the shot much harder to block. The shooter must have very good accuracy, much higher than when releasing a regular jump shot, and must use more strength to counteract the backwards momentum in a relatively short amount of time. Because the movement is away from the basket, the shooter also has less chance to grab their own rebound.

Because the shooting percentage is lower in fadeaway due to the difficulty of the shot and because it is harder for the shooter to get their own rebound, many coaches and players believe it is one of the worst shots in the game to take. Biomechanically, fadeaway shots are worse because the player's center of mass is moving backward, which causes the release angle of the ball to vary more than a static jump shot. The ideal release angle for shooting a basketball is between 45 and 55 degrees, while fadeaways have an average release angle of 59. Once mastered, however, it is one of the hardest methods of shooting for defenders to block. The threat of a fadeaway forces a defender to jump into the shooter, and with a pump fake, the shooter can easily get a foul on the defender.

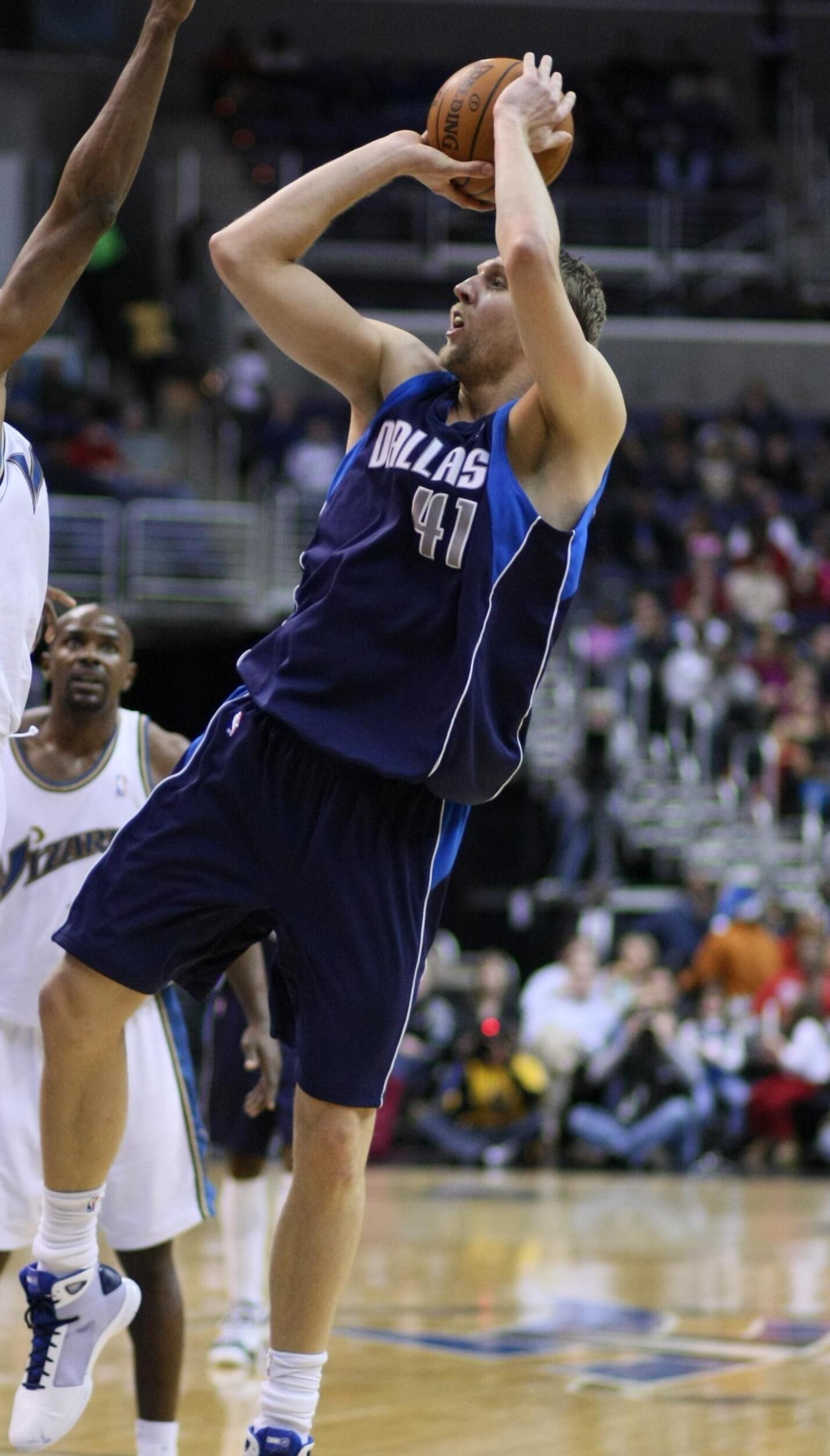
Dirk Nowitzki shoots the one legged version of the fadeaway that he popularized against the Washington Wizards

Only a handful of NBA players have been successful shooting fadeaways. Wilt Chamberlain was a pioneer of the fadeaway, and Kevin McHale helped popularize it in the 1980s. Michael Jordan and Kobe Bryant are regarded as two of the most popular shooters of the fadeaway. Dirk Nowitzki used a unique and iconic one-legged version of the shot.

== See also ==
- Basketball moves
- NBA records
