= Dallas Mavericks all-time roster and statistics leaders =

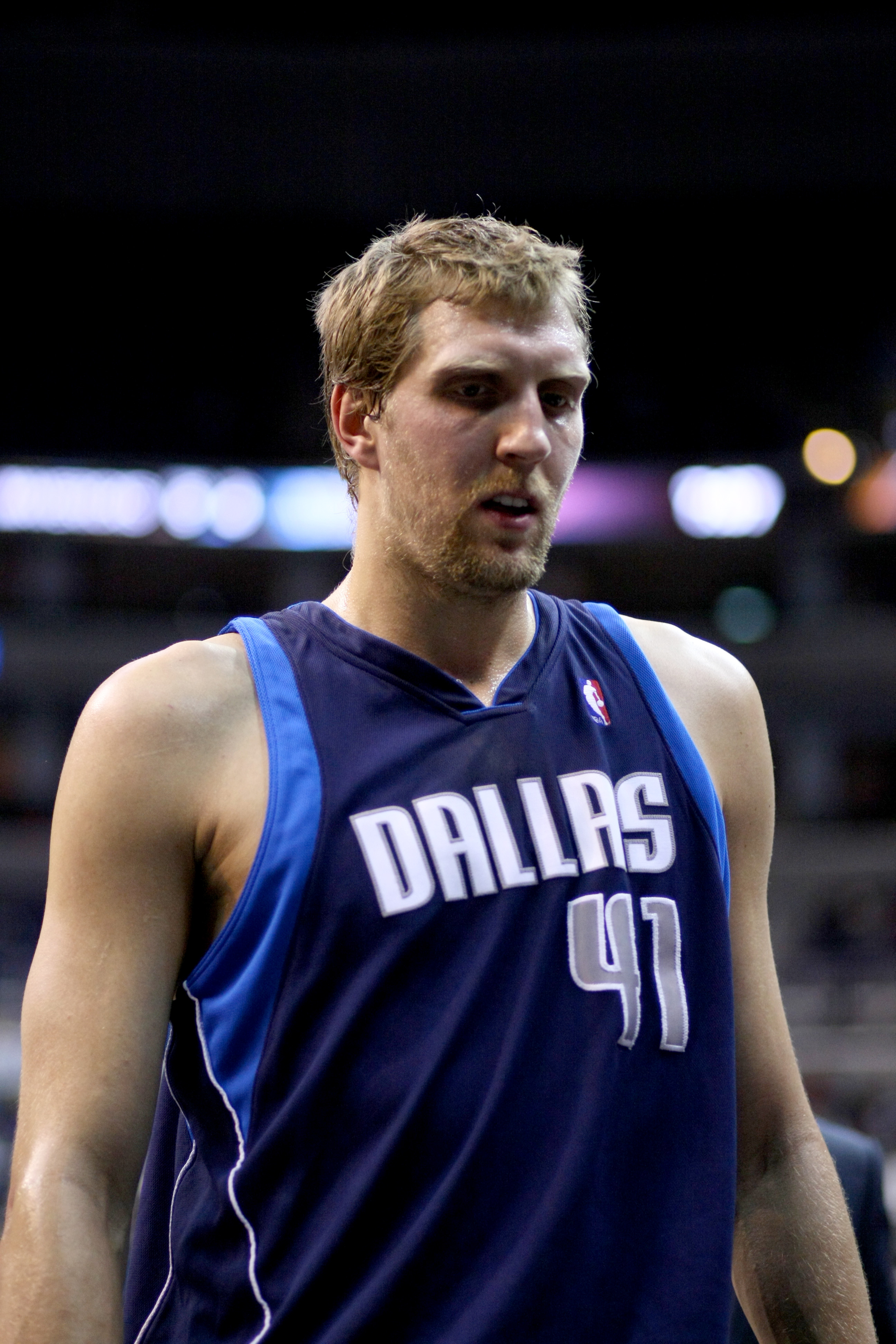
Dirk Nowitzki is the longest-serving player in Mavericks history.

The Dallas Mavericks are an American professional basketball team based in Dallas. They play in the Southwest Division of the Western Conference in the National Basketball Association (NBA). The team joined the NBA in 1980 as an expansion team and won their first NBA championship in 2011. The Mavericks have played their home games at the American Airlines Center since 2001. Their principal owners are Miriam Adelson and Patrick Dumont. Their current staff includes Mike Schmitz as general manager and Jason Kidd as the most recent head coach.

Dirk Nowitzki, who played his entire NBA career with the Mavericks starting in 1998, is the franchise's longest-serving player. He played more games, played more minutes, scored more points, and recorded more rebounds than any other Maverick. He also leads the franchise in field goals made, three-pointers made, and free throws made. His achievements include the Most Valuable Player Award in 2007, Finals Most Valuable Player Award in 2011, 14 All-Star Game selections, and 12 consecutive All-NBA Team selections.

Another prominent Maverick, Steve Nash, was selected to two All-NBA Teams and two All-Star Games. He and Luka Dončić (five times) are the only other Mavericks who have been selected to the All-NBA Team. Rolando Blackman and Mark Aguirre were selected to four and three All-Star games, respectively, and Dončić has been selected to five as of 2024. Six other players, James Donaldson, Michael Finley, Chris Gatling, Josh Howard, Kyrie Irving, and Jason Kidd, were selected to the All-Star Game at least once during their Mavericks careers. Three Mavericks have won the NBA Sixth Man of the Year Award: Roy Tarpley in 1988, Antawn Jamison in 2004, and Jason Terry in 2009. Twelve players were selected to the All-Rookie Team, including Kidd, who won the Rookie of the Year Award in 1995, Dončić, who earned the distinction in 2019, and Cooper Flagg, who earned the distinction in 2026. Nine players have been inducted to the Basketball Hall of Fame. Guard Derek Harper, who played 12 seasons with the Mavericks during two separate stints, is the franchise leader in assists and steals. Before being passed by Nowitzki, the blocked shots category was led by center Shawn Bradley, who once led the league in blocks.

The Mavericks have five retired jersey numbers: the number 12 jersey worn by Derek Harper, the number 15 jersey worn by Brad Davis, the number 22 jersey worn by Rolando Blackman, the number 24 jersey worn by Mark Aguirre, and the number 41 jersey worn by Dirk Nowitzki. Davis, who played 12 seasons with the Mavericks until his retirement in 1992, had his number 15 jersey retired by the franchise in November 1992. Blackman, who played 11 seasons with the Mavericks after being selected by the team in the 1981 draft, had his number 22 jersey retired in March 2000. Harper, who played parts of 12 seasons in two stints with the Mavericks starting with the 1983 draft, had his number 12 jersey retired in January 2018. Nowitzki had his number 41 jersey retired in January 2022. In January 2020 Kobe Bryant's no. 24 jersey was unofficially retired following his death even though he never played for the team. It was later officially retired for Mark Aguirre in January 2026.

== List ==
Note: Statistics are correct as of the end of the 2025–26 NBA season.

| Pos | G | Guard | F | Forward | C | Center |
| No | Jersey number | | | | | |
| Yrs | Number of seasons played with the Mavericks | | | | | |
| * | Denotes player who has been inducted to the Basketball Hall of Fame | | | | | |
| ^ | Denotes player who is currently on the Mavericks roster | | | | | |
| † | Denotes player who has spent their entire NBA career with the Mavericks | | | | | |
| ^{#} | Denotes jersey number that has been retired by the Mavericks | | | | | |

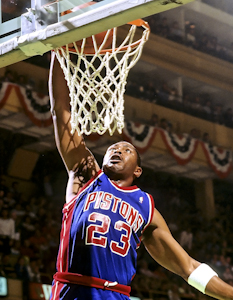
Mark Aguirre is the first Maverick to be selected to an All-Star Game.

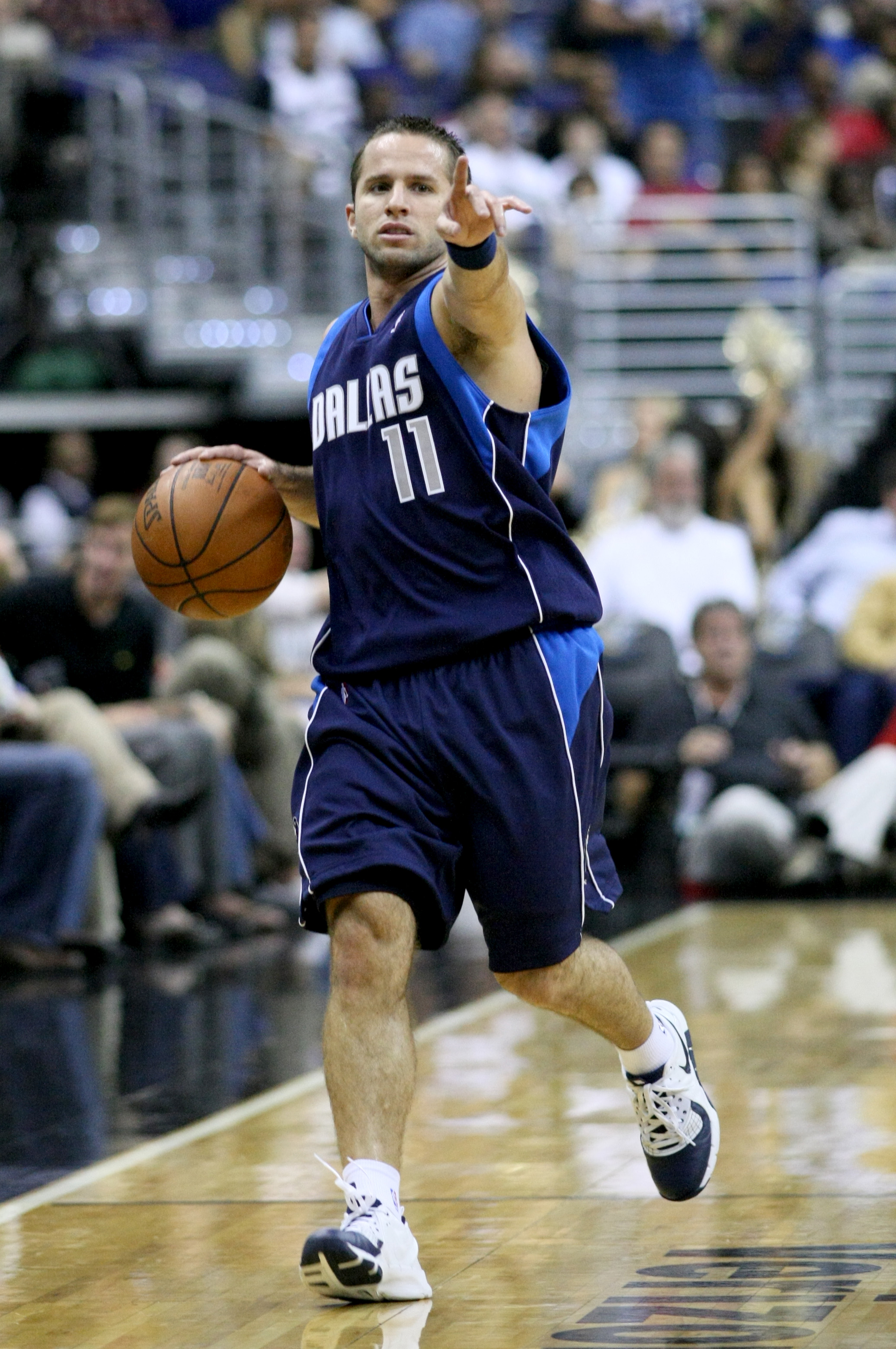
J.J. Barea, a member of the 2011 championship team, is the only Puerto Rican to play for the Mavericks.

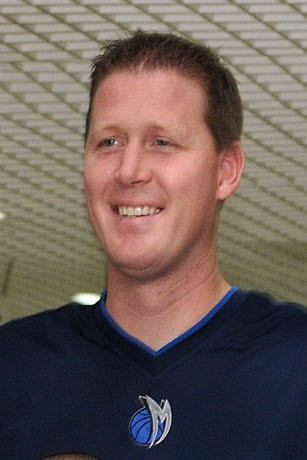
Shawn Bradley led the NBA in blocks per game in 1997 while with the Mavericks.

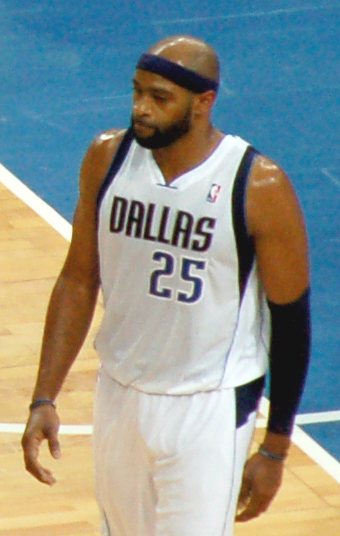
Hall-of-Fame swingman Vince Carter played three seasons with the Mavericks.

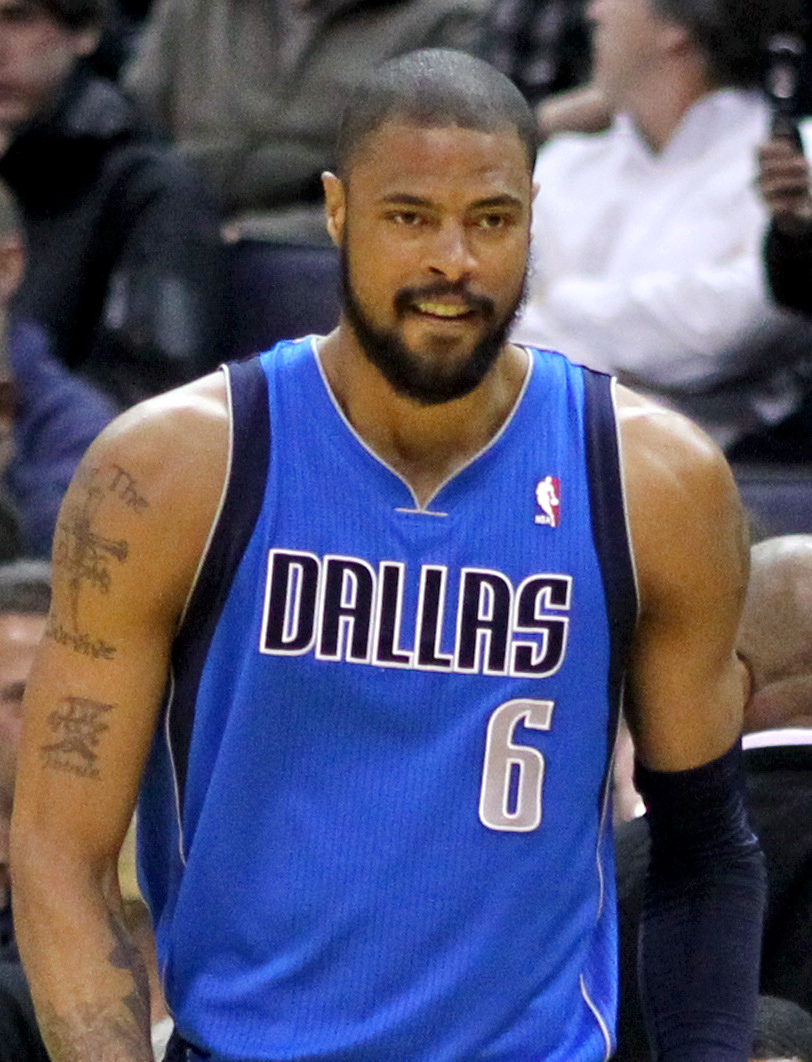
Tyson Chandler, a member of the 2011 championship team, was named to the NBA All-Defensive Second Team as a Maverick that same season.

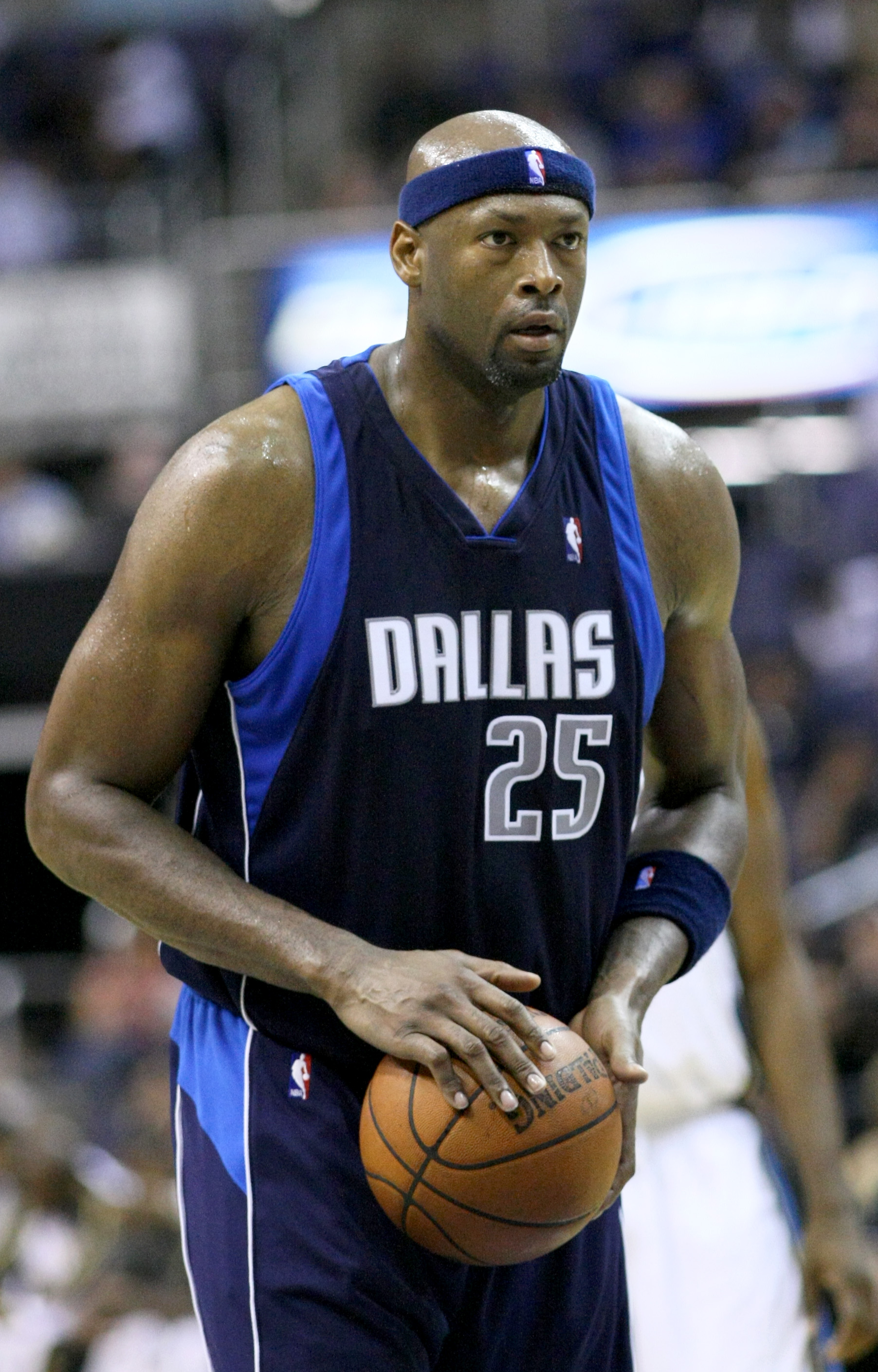
Erick Dampier was the Mavericks starting center for six seasons.

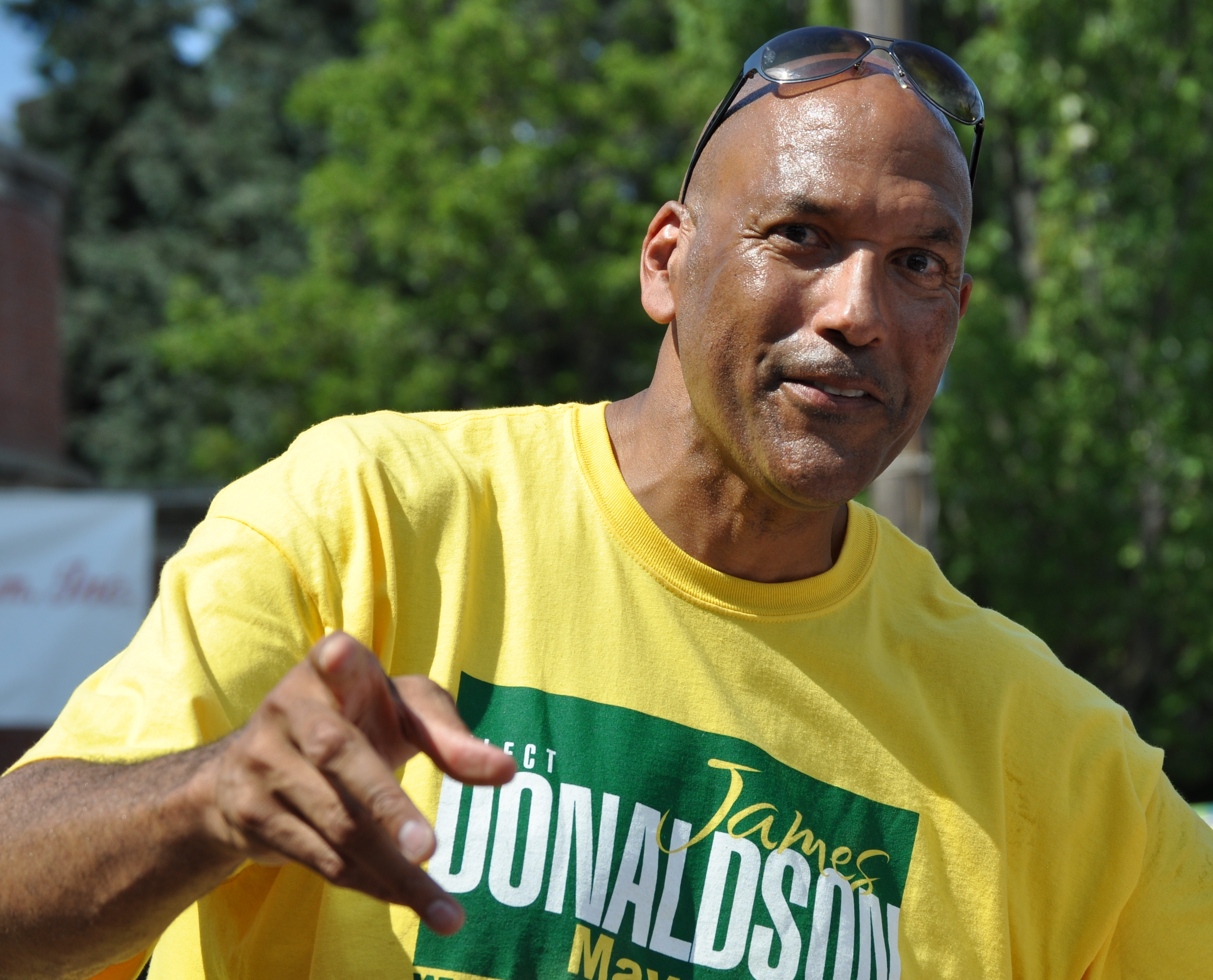
James Donaldson represented the Mavericks in the 1988 All-Star Game.

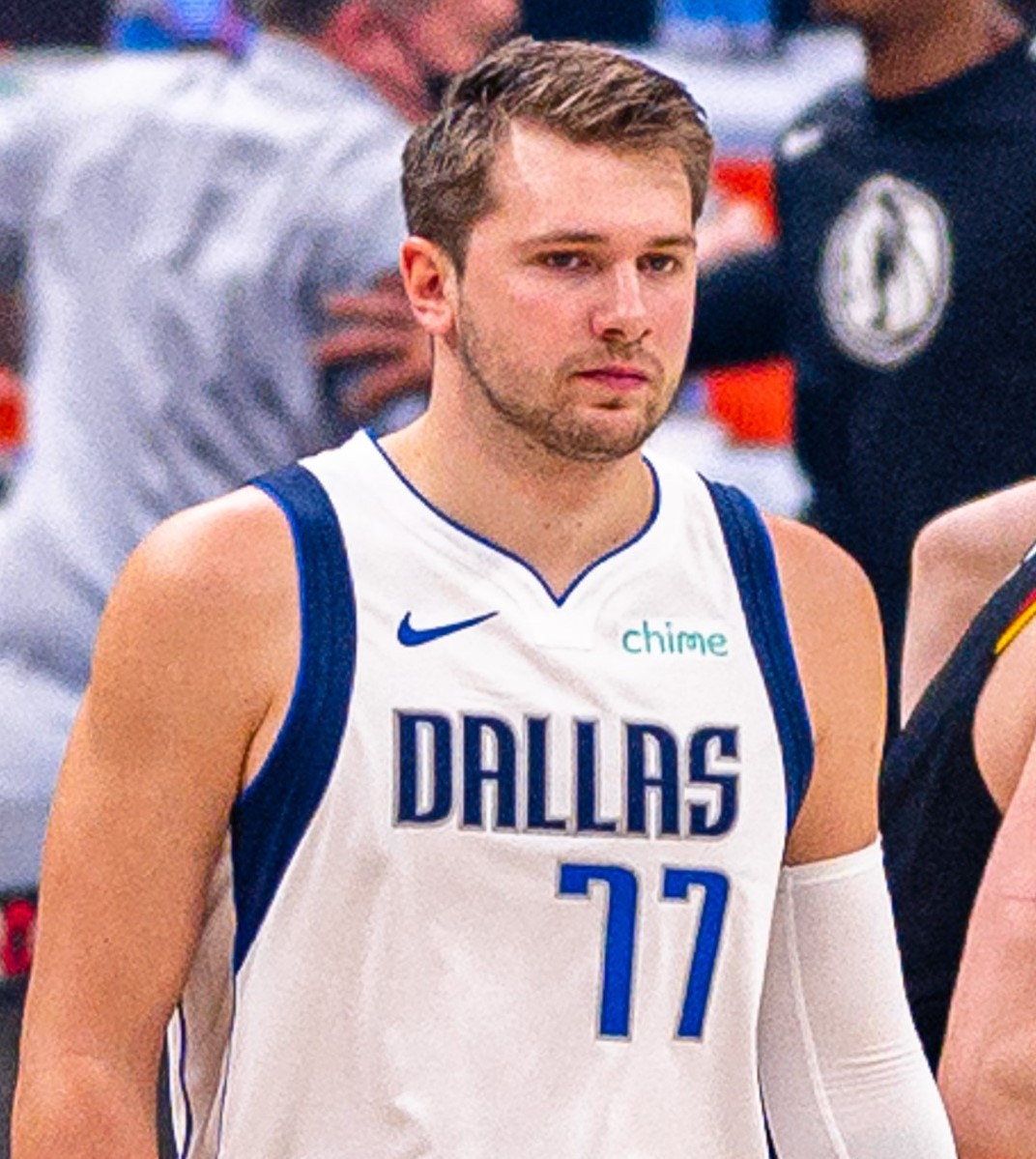
Luka Dončić was selected to five All-Star Games and five All-NBA Teams during his time with the Mavericks.

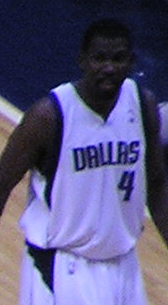
Michael Finley was selected to two All-Star Games as a Maverick.

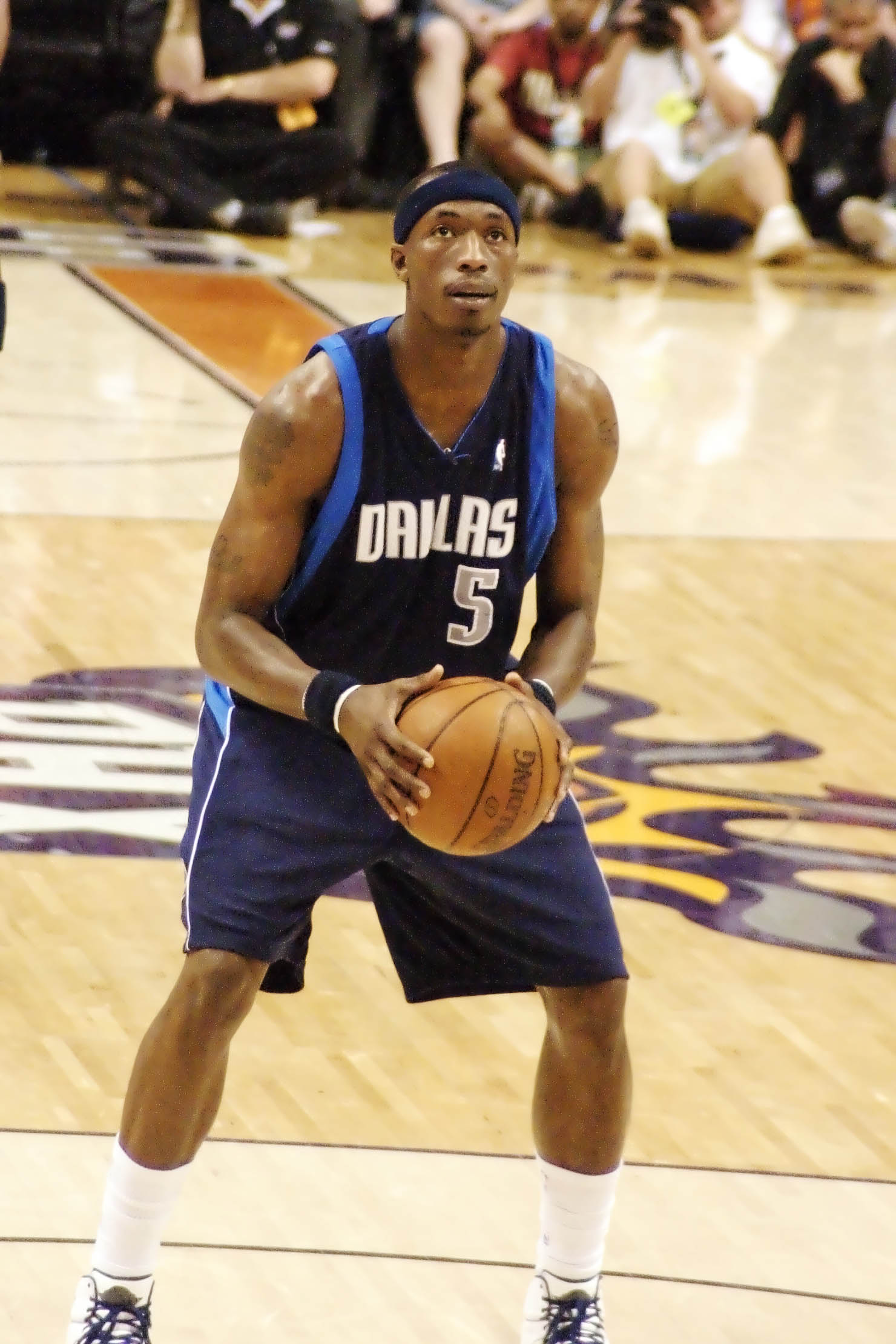
Josh Howard represented the Mavericks in the 2007 All-Star Game.

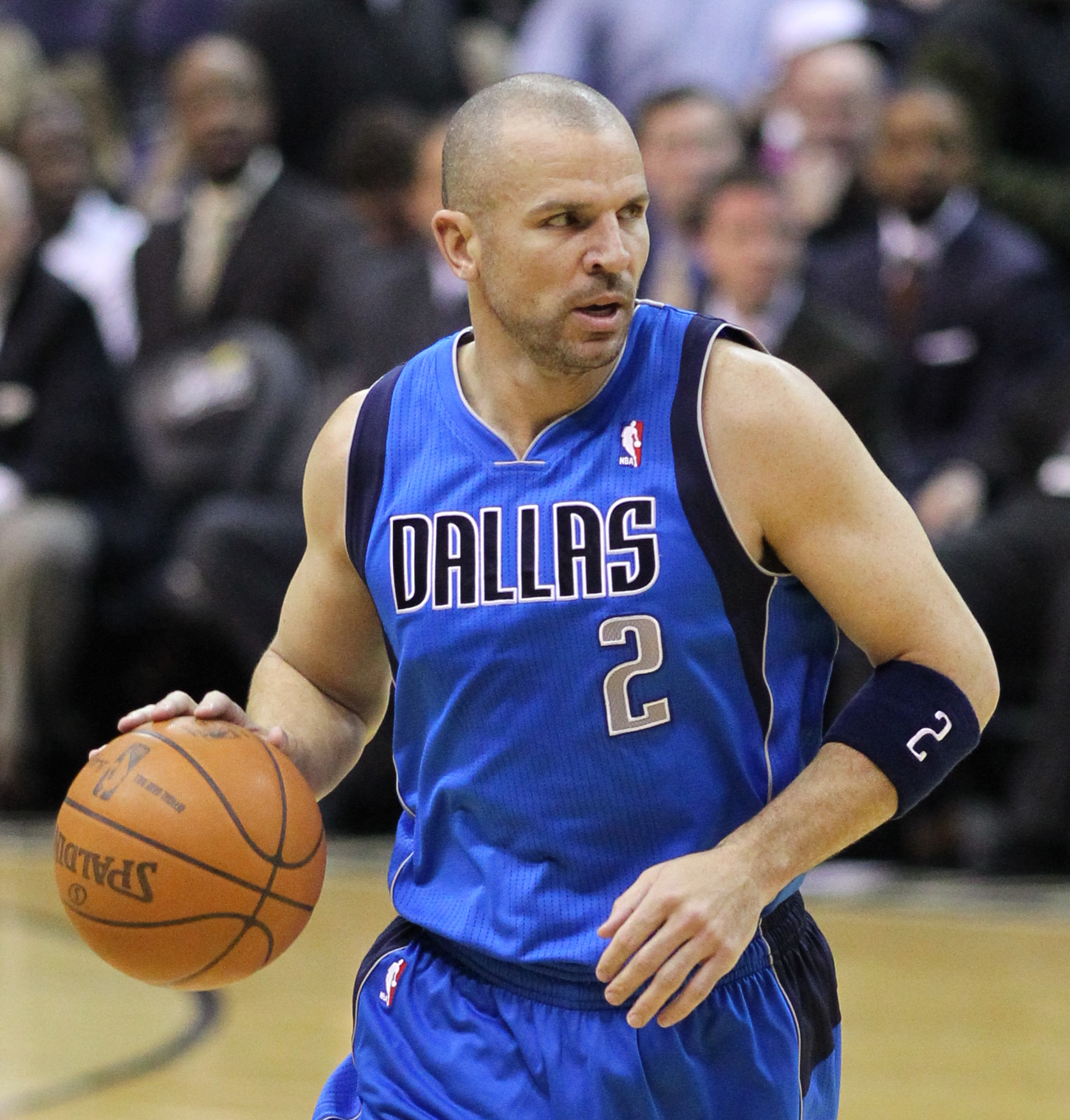
Jason Kidd won the Rookie of the Year Award in 1995.

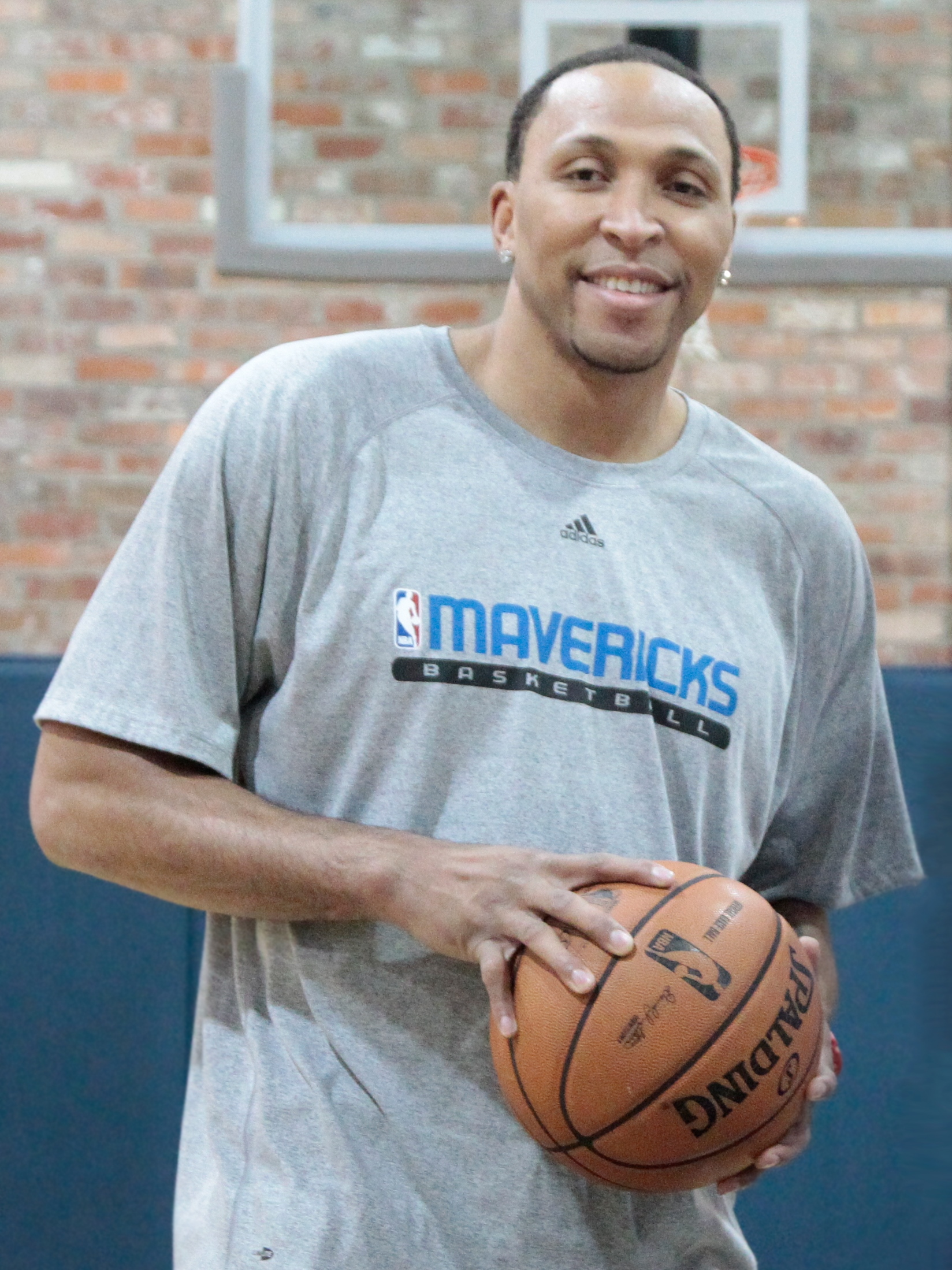
All-Star forward Shawn Marion played five seasons with the Mavericks.

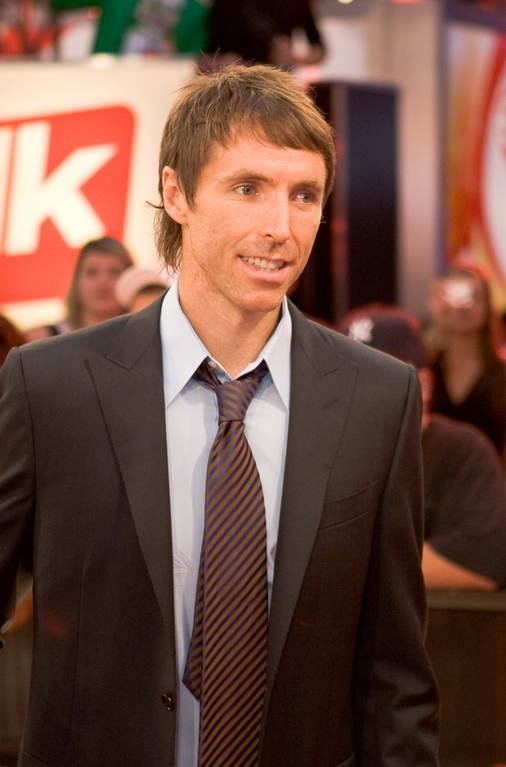
Steve Nash was selected to two All-Star Games and two All-NBA Teams as a Maverick.

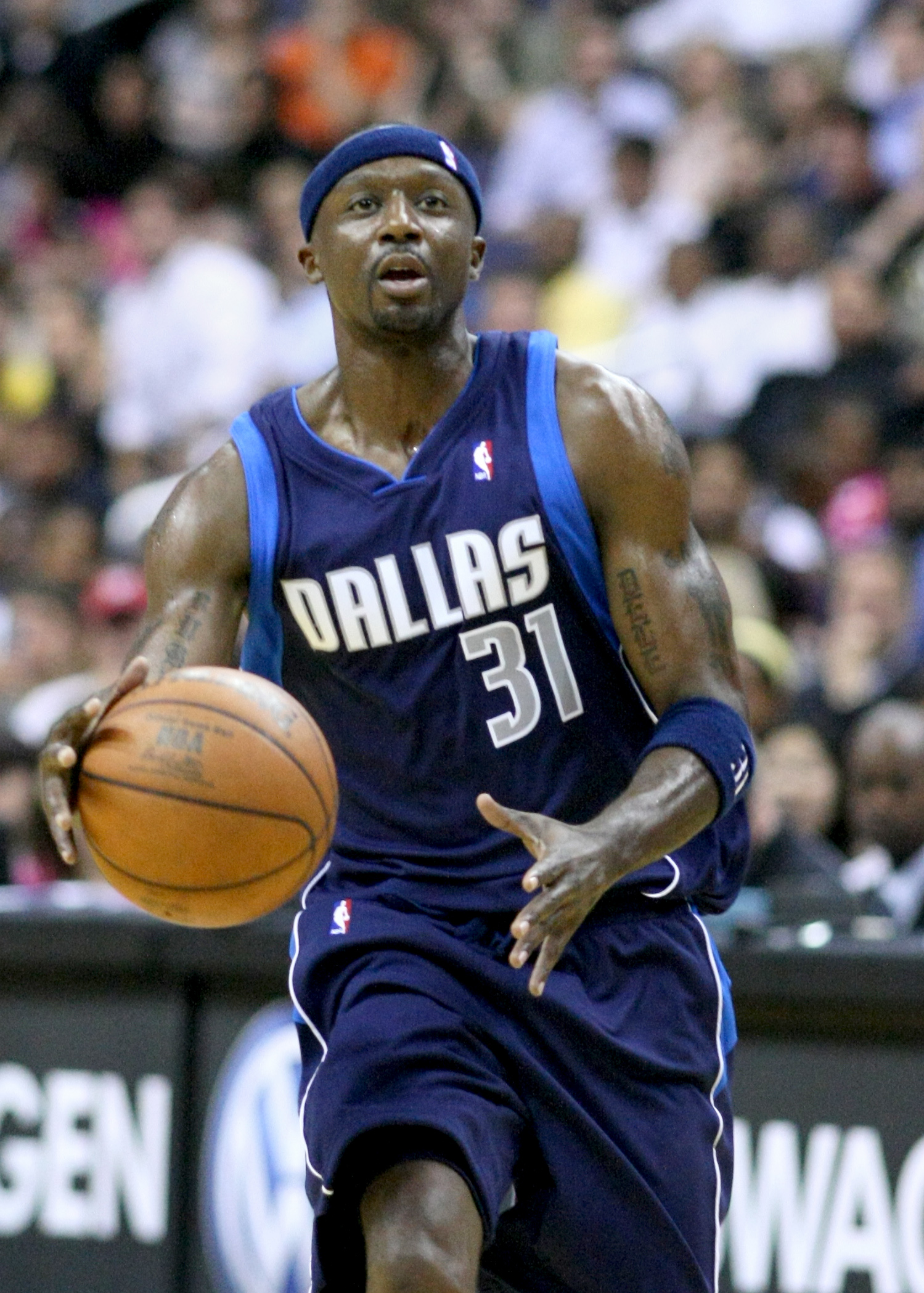
Jason Terry won the NBA Sixth Man of the Year Award in 2009.

| Player | Pos | No^{[a]} | Yrs | From^{[b]} | To^{[b]} | Notes and achievements^{[c]} | Ref. |
|---|---|---|---|---|---|---|---|
| Tariq Abdul-Wahad (formerly Olivier Saint-Jean) | F/G | 9 | 2 | 2002 | 2003 | | |
| Maurice Ager | G | 13 | 2 | 2006 | 2008 | | |
| Mark Aguirre | F | 24^{#} | 8 | 1981 | 1989 | • 3× NBA All-Star (1984, 1987, 1988) | |
| Alexis Ajinça | C | 8 | 1 | 2010 | 2011 | | |
| Josh Akognon | G | 10 | 1† | 2013 | 2013 | | |
| Courtney Alexander | G | 8 | 1 | 2000 | 2001 | | |
| Steve Alford | G | 2 / 4 | 4 | 1987; 1989 | 1988; 1991 | | |
| Malik Allen | F/C | 30 | 1 | 2008 | 2008 | | |
| Darrell Allums | F/C | 32 | 1† | 1980 | 1980 | | |
| Al-Farouq Aminu | F | 7 | 1 | 2014 | 2015 | | |
| Justin Anderson | G/F | 1 | 2 | 2015 | 2017 | | |
| Chris Anstey | C/F | 11 | 2 | 1997 | 1999 | | |
| Darrell Armstrong | G | 10 | 2 | 2004 | 2006 | | |
| Kelenna Azubuike | G | 4 | 1 | 2012 | 2012 | | |
| Marvin Bagley III^ | F/C | 35 | 1 | 2026 | present | | |
| Steve Bardo | G | 23 | 1 | 1992 | 1993 | | |
| José Juan Barea | G | 5 / 11 | 11 | 2006; 2014 | 2011; 2020 | • NBA champion (2011) | |
| Harrison Barnes | F | 40 | 3 | 2016 | 2019 | | |
| Brandon Bass | F | 32 | 2 | 2007 | 2009 | | |
| Rodrigue Beaubois | G | 3 | 4† | 2009 | 2013 | • NBA champion (2011) | |
| Charlie Bell | G | 3 | 1 | 2002 | 2002 | | |
| Raja Bell | G | 11 | 1 | 2002 | 2003 | | |
| Dāvis Bertāns | F | 44 | 2 | 2021 | 2023 | | |
| Travis Best | G | 3 | 1 | 2003 | 2004 | | |
| Uwe Blab | C | 33 | 4 | 1985 | 1989 | | |
| Rolando Blackman | G | 22^{#} | 11 | 1981 | 1992 | • 4× NBA All-Star (1985, 1986, 1987, 1990) | |
| DeJuan Blair | F | 45 | 1 | 2013 | 2014 | | |
| Andrew Bogut | C | 6 | 1 | 2016 | 2017 | | |
| Walter Bond | G | 40 | 1 | 1992 | 1993 | | |
| Calvin Booth | C | 52 | 2 | 2001; 2004 | 2001; 2005 | | |
| Winford Boynes | G/F | 6 | 1 | 1980 | 1981 | • Drafted in the 1980 NBA expansion draft | |
| Shawn Bradley | C | 44 | 9 | 1997 | 2005 | • NBA blocks leader (1997) | |
| Elton Brand | F | 42 | 1 | 2012 | 2013 | | |
| Corey Brewer | F | 13 | 1 | 2011 | 2011 | • NBA champion (2011) | |
| Allan Bristow | F/G | 23 | 2 | 1981 | 1983 | | |
| Scott Brooks | G | 1 | 2 | 1995 | 1996 | | |
| Chucky Brown | F | 6 | 1 | 1993 | 1993 | | |
| Greg Brown III | F | 13 | 1 | 2023 | 2024 | | |
| Mark Bryant | F/C | 2 | 1 | 2000 | 2001 | | |
| Wallace Bryant | C | 55 | 2 | 1984 | 1985 | | |
| Greg Buckner | G/F | 1 / 21 | 4 | 1999; 2006 | 2002; 2007 | | |
| Reggie Bullock | G/F | 25 | 2 | 2021 | 2023 | | |
| Caron Butler | F | 4 | 2 | 2010 | 2011 | • NBA champion (2011) | |
| Marty Byrnes | F | 45 | 1 | 1980 | 1981 | • Drafted in the 1980 NBA expansion draft | |
| José Calderón | G | 8 | 1 | 2013 | 2014 | | |
| Adrian Caldwell | F/C | 51 | 1 | 1997 | 1997 | | |
| Dexter Cambridge | F | 30 | 1† | 1992 | 1993 | | |
| Tony Campbell | F/G | 19 | 1 | 1994 | 1994 | | |
| Brian Cardinal | F | 35 | 2 | 2010 | 2012 | • NBA champion (2011) | |
| Austin Carr | G | 34 | 1 | 1980 | 1980 | • Drafted in the 1980 NBA expansion draft | |
| Matt Carroll | G | 13 | 2 | 2009 | 2010 | | |
| Howard Carter | G | 32 | 1 | 1984 | 1984 | | |
| Vince Carter* | G/F | 25 | 3 | 2011 | 2014 | | |
| Sam Cassell | G | 10 | 1 | 1996 | 1997 | | |
| Cedric Ceballos | F | 23 | 3 | 1998 | 2000 | | |
| Tyson Chandler | C | 6 | 2 | 2010; 2014 | 2011; 2015 | • NBA champion (2011) • NBA All-Defensive Second Team (2011) | |
| Doug Christie | G/F | 13 | 1 | 2005 | 2005 | | |
| Max Christie^ | G | 00 | 2 | 2025 | present | | |
| Moussa Cissé^ | C | 30 | 1† | 2025 | present | | |
| Kyle Collinsworth | G | 8 | 1 | 2017 | 2018 | | |
| Darren Collison | G | 4 | 1 | 2012 | 2013 | | |
| Wayne Cooper | C/F | 43 | 1 | 1981 | 1982 | | |
| Austin Croshere | F | 44 | 1 | 2006 | 2007 | | |
| Jae Crowder | F | 9 | 3 | 2012 | 2014 | | |
| Pat Cummings | F/C | 42 | 2 | 1982 | 1984 | | |
| Jared Cunningham | G | 1 | 1 | 2012 | 2013 | | |
| Radisav Ćurčić | C | 44 | 1† | 1992 | 1993 | | |
| Bill Curley | F | 31 | 1 | 2000 | 2000 | | |
| Eddy Curry | C | 52 | 1 | 2012 | 2012 | | |
| Seth Curry | G | 30 | 3 | 2016; 2019; 2023 | 2018; 2020; 2024 | | |
| Samuel Dalembert | C | 1 | 1 | 2013 | 2014 | | |
| Erick Dampier | C | 25 | 6 | 2004 | 2010 | | |
| Marquis Daniels | G/F | 6 | 3 | 2003 | 2006 | • NBA All-Rookie Second Team (2004) | |
| Predrag Danilović | G | 5 | 1 | 1997 | 1997 | | |
| Adrian Dantley* | F/G | 4 | 2 | 1989 | 1990 | | |
| Anthony Davis | F/C | 3 | 2 | 2025 | 2026 | • NBA All-Star (2025) | |
| Brad Davis | G | 15^{#} | 12 | 1980 | 1992 | | |
| Hubert Davis | G | 24 | 4 | 1997 | 2001 | | |
| Monti Davis | F | 43 | 1 | 1981 | 1981 | | |
| Terry Davis | F/C | 43 | 5 | 1991 | 1996 | | |
| Tony Delk | G | 7 | 1 | 2003 | 2004 | | |
| Dexter Dennis | G | 17 | 1 | 2023 | 2024 | | |
| Justin Dentmon | G | 7 | 1 | 2013 | 2013 | | |
| Dan Dickau | G | 21 | 1 | 2004 | 2004 | | |
| Spencer Dinwiddie | G | 26 | 3 | 2021; 2023 | 2023; 2025 | | |
| DeSagana Diop | C | 7 | 4 | 2005; 2008 | 2008; 2009 | | |
| James Donaldson | C | 40 | 7 | 1985 | 1992 | • NBA All-Star (1988) | |
| Luka Dončić | G | 77 | 7 | 2018 | 2025 | • 5x NBA All-Star (2020–2024) • 5× All-NBA First Team (2020, 2021, 2022, 2023, 2024) • NBA Rookie of the Year (2019) • NBA All-Rookie First Team (2019) • NBA scoring leader (2024) | |
| Chris Douglas-Roberts | G | 17 | 1 | 2012 | 2013 | | |
| Greg Dreiling | | 40 / 50 | 2 | 1993; 1996 | 1994; 1997 | | |
| Ralph Drollinger | C | 52 | 1† | 1980 | 1981 | | |
| Terry Duerod | G | 42 | 1 | 1980 | 1980 | • Drafted in the 1980 NBA expansion draft | |
| Tony Dumas | G | 7 | 3 | 1994 | 1996 | | |
| Howard Eisley | G | 9 | 1 | 2000 | 2001 | | |
| Obinna Ekezie | F/C | 54 | 1 | 2001 | 2001 | | |
| Wayne Ellington | G | 21 | 1 | 2013 | 2014 | | |
| Dale Ellis | G/F | 14 | 3 | 1983 | 1986 | | |
| Monta Ellis | G | 11 | 2 | 2013 | 2015 | | |
| Alex English* | F | 2 | 1 | 1990 | 1991 | | |
| Evan Eschmeyer | C | 42 | 2 | 2001 | 2003 | | |
| Jeremy Evans | F | 21 | 1 | 2015 | 2016 | | |
| Danté Exum | G | 0 | 2 | 2023 | 2026 | | |
| Jim Farmer | G | 21 | 1 | 1987 | 1988 | | |
| Nick Fazekas | F | 20 | 1 | 2007 | 2008 | | |
| Raymond Felton | G | 2 | 2 | 2014 | 2016 | | |
| Yogi Ferrell | G | 11 | 2 | 2017 | 2018 | | |
| Michael Finley | G/F | 4 | 9 | 1996 | 2005 | • 2× NBA All-Star (2000, 2001) | |
| Dorian Finney-Smith | F | 10 | 7 | 2016 | 2023 | | |
| Derek Fisher | G | 6 | 1 | 2012 | 2012 | | |
| Cooper Flagg^ | F | 32 | 1† | 2025 | present | • NBA Rookie of the Year (2026) • NBA All-Rookie First Team (2026) | |
| Danny Fortson | F/C | 21 | 1 | 2003 | 2004 | | |
| Daniel Gafford^ | C | 21 | 3 | 2024 | present | | |
| Bill Garnett | F | 20 | 2 | 1982 | 1984 | | |
| Tom Garrick | G | 5 | 1 | 1992 | 1992 | | |
| Chris Gatling | F/C | 25 | 1 | 1996 | 1997 | • NBA All-Star (1997) | |
| Devean George | G/F | 40 | 3 | 2006 | 2009 | | |
| Drew Gooden | F | 90 | 1 | 2009 | 2010 | | |
| Jim Grandholm | F/C | 50 | 1† | 1990 | 1991 | | |
| A.C. Green | F/C | 45 | 3 | 1996 | 1999 | | |
| Gerald Green | F/G | 8 | 1 | 2008 | 2009 | | |
| Josh Green | F | 8 | 4 | 2020 | 2024 | | |
| Adrian Griffin | G/F | 7 / 44 | 3 | 2001; 2005 | 2003; 2006 | | |
| Tim Hardaway* | G | 10 | 1 | 2001 | 2002 | | |
| Tim Hardaway Jr. | G | 10 / 11 | 5 | 2019 | 2024 | | |
| Jaden Hardy | G | 1 / 3 | 4 | 2022 | 2026 | | |
| Derek Harper | G | 12^{#} | 12 | 1983; 1996 | 1994; 1997 | • 2× NBA All-Defensive Second Team (1987, 1990) | |
| Adam Harrington | G | 21 | 1 | 2002 | 2003 | | |
| Devin Harris | G | 34 / 20 | 10 | 2004; 2013; 2018 | 2008; 2018; 2019 | | |
| Lucious Harris | G | 30 | 3 | 1993 | 1996 | | |
| Aaron Harrison | G | 9 | 1 | 2018 | 2018 | | |
| Donnell Harvey | F | 1 | 2 | 2000 | 2002 | | |
| Trenton Hassell | G/F | 23 | 1 | 2007 | 2008 | | |
| Joe Hassett | G | 10 | 1 | 1980 | 1980 | • Drafted in the 1980 NBA expansion draft | |
| Brendan Haywood | C | 33 | 3 | 2010 | 2012 | • NBA champion (2011) | |
| Alan Henderson | F | 50 | 1 | 2004 | 2005 | | |
| Donald Hodge | C | 35 | 5 | 1991 | 1996 | | |
| Justin Holiday | G | 0 | 1 | 2022 | 2023 | | |
| Ryan Hollins | C | 1 | 1 | 2009 | 2009 | | |
| Richaun Holmes | F | 20 | 1 | 2023 | 2024 | | |
| Brian Howard | F | 41 | 2† | 1992 | 1993 | | |
| Josh Howard | F/G | 5 | 7 | 2003 | 2010 | • NBA All-Star (2007) • NBA All-Rookie Second Team (2004) | |
| Juwan Howard | F | 5 / 55 | 3 | 2001; 2007 | 2002; 2008 | | |
| Rick Hughes | F | 3 | 1† | 1999 | 2000 | | |
| Kris Humphries | F | 43 | 1 | 2009 | 2010 | | |
| Geoff Huston | G | 20 | 1 | 1980 | 1981 | • Drafted in the 1980 NBA expansion draft | |
| Didier Ilunga-Mbenga | C | 28 | 3 | 2004 | 2007 | | |
| Kyrie Irving^ | G | 2 / 11 | 3 | 2023 | present | • 2× NBA All-Star (2023, 2025) | |
| Mike Iuzzolino | G | 55 / 13 | 2† | 1991 | 1993 | | |
| Jim Jackson | G | 24 | 5 | 1992 | 1997 | | |
| Myron Jackson | G | 6 | 1† | 1986 | 1986 | | |
| Randell Jackson | F | 43 | 1 | 1999 | 1999 | | |
| Bernard James | C | 5 / 55 | 3† | 2012; 2015 | 2014; 2015 | | |
| Mike James | G | 13 | 1 | 2013 | 2013 | | |
| Antawn Jamison | F | 33 | 1 | 2003 | 2004 | • NBA Sixth Man of the Year (2004) | |
| Abdul Jeelani (formerly Gary Cole) | F/C | 11 | 1 | 1980 | 1981 | • Drafted in the 1980 NBA expansion draft | |
| Richard Jefferson | F | 24 | 1 | 2014 | 2015 | | |
| John Jenkins | G | 12 | 1 | 2015 | 2016 | | |
| AJ Johnson^ | G | 8 | 1 | 2026 | present | | |
| Anthony Johnson | G | 8 | 1 | 2006 | 2007 | | |
| Avery Johnson | G | 5 / 6 | 2 | 2002 | 2003 | | |
| Anthony Jones | G/F | 21 | 2 | 1989 | 1990 | | |
| Dahntay Jones | G | 30 | 1 | 2012 | 2013 | | |
| Damon Jones | G | 11 | 1 | 1999 | 2000 | | |
| Derrick Jones Jr. | F | 55 | 1 | 2023 | 2024 | | |
| Dominique Jones | G | 20 | 3† | 2010 | 2013 | • NBA champion (2011) | |
| Eddie Jones | G/F | 6 | 1 | 2007 | 2008 | | |
| Jalen Jones | F | 21 | 1 | 2018 | 2018 | | |
| Popeye Jones | F | 54 | 4 | 1993; 2002 | 1996; 2003 | | |
| Tyus Jones | G | 1 | 1 | 2026 | 2026 | | |
| Chris Kaman | C | 35 | 1 | 2012 | 2013 | | |
| Clarence Kea | F | 53 | 2† | 1980 | 1982 | | |
| Harold Keeling | G | 43 | 1† | 1986 | 1986 | | |
| Miles Kelly | G | 14 | 1 | 2025 | 2026 | | |
| Jason Kidd* | G | 2 / 5 | 8 | 1994; 2008 | 1996; 2012 | • NBA champion (2011) • 2× NBA All-Star (1996, 2010) • NBA Rookie of the Year (1995) • NBA All-Rookie First Team (1995) • NBA Sportsmanship Award (2012) | |
| Chad Kinch | G | 21 | 1 | 1981 | 1981 | | |
| Stacey King | F/C | 33 | 1 | 1997 | 1997 | | |
| Maxi Kleber | F | 42 | 8 | 2017 | 2025 | | |
| Christian Laettner | F/C | 32 | 1 | 2000 | 2001 | | |
| Raef LaFrentz | F/C | 45 | 2 | 2002 | 2003 | | |
| Tom LaGarde | C/F | 25 | 2 | 1980 | 1982 | • Drafted in the 1980 NBA expansion draft | |
| Shane Larkin | G | 3 | 1 | 2013 | 2014 | | |
| A. J. Lawson | G | 9 | 2 | 2022 | 2025 | | |
| Ricky Ledo | G | 7 / 1 | 2 | 2013 | 2015 | | |
| David Lee | F/C | 42 | 1 | 2016 | 2016 | | |
| Tim Legler | G | 23 | 2 | 1993 | 1994 | | |
| Fat Lever | G | 21 | 3 | 1990 | 1994 | | |
| Dereck Lively II^ | C | 2 | 3† | 2023 | present | • NBA All-Rookie Second Team (2024) | |
| Scott Lloyd | C/F | 44 | 3 | 1980 | 1982 | | |
| Tyronn Lue | G | 10 | 1 | 2008 | 2008 | | |
| Oliver Mack | G | 17 | 2 | 1980 | 1981 | | |
| Jamaal Magloire | C | 20 | 1 | 2008 | 2008 | | |
| Ian Mahinmi | C | 28 | 2 | 2010 | 2012 | • NBA champion (2011) | |
| Danny Manning | F/C | 6 | 1 | 2001 | 2002 | | |
| Shawn Marion | F | 0 | 5 | 2009 | 2014 | • NBA champion (2011) | |
| Naji Marshall^ | F | 13 | 2 | 2024 | present | | |
| Rawle Marshall | G/F | 1 | 1 | 2005 | 2006 | | |
| Caleb Martin^ | F | 16 | 2 | 2025 | present | | |
| Darrick Martin | G | 2 | 1 | 2001 | 2001 | | |
| Jamal Mashburn | F | 32 | 4 | 1993 | 1997 | • NBA All-Rookie First Team (1994) | |
| Wesley Matthews | G | 23 | 4 | 2015 | 2019 | | |
| O. J. Mayo | G | 32 | 1 | 2012 | 2013 | | |
| Bob McCann | F | 7 | 1 | 1990 | 1990 | | |
| George McCloud | G/F | 21 | 3 | 1995 | 1997 | | |
| Rodney McCray | F/G | 1 | 2 | 1990 | 1992 | | |
| Doug McDermott | F | 20 | 1 | 2018 | 2018 | | |
| JaVale McGee | C | 00 / 11 | 2 | 2015; 2022 | 2016; 2023 | | |
| Salah Mejri | C | 50 | 4† | 2015 | 2019 | | |
| Gal Mekel | G | 33 | 1 | 2013 | 2014 | | |
| Pops Mensah-Bonsu | F | 21 | 1 | 2006 | 2007 | | |
| Loren Meyer | C/F | 40 | 2 | 1995 | 1996 | | |
| Khris Middleton^ | F | 20 | 1 | 2026 | present | | |
| Oliver Miller | C | 2 | 1 | 1996 | 1997 | | |
| Eric Montross | C | 00 | 1 | 1996 | 1997 | | |
| Tracy Moore | G/F | 20 | 2 | 1992 | 1993 | | |
| Darren Morningstar | C | 50 | 1 | 1993 | 1993 | | |
| Markieff Morris | F | 13 / 88 | 3 | 2023 | 2025 | | |
| Anthony Morrow | G | 23 | 1 | 2013 | 2013 | | |
| Johnathan Motley | F | 6 | 1 | 2017 | 2018 | | |
| Troy Murphy | F | 6 | 1 | 2012 | 2012 | | |
| Martin Müürsepp | F | 31 / 13 | 2 | 1997 | 1998 | | |
| Mamadou N'Diaye | C | 34 | 1 | 2004 | 2004 | | |
| Eduardo Nájera | F | 14 | 5 | 2000; 2010 | 2004; 2010 | | |
| Steve Nash* | G | 13 | 6 | 1998 | 2004 | • 2× NBA All-Star (2002, 2003) • 2× All-NBA Third Team (2002, 2003) | |
| Jameer Nelson | G | 14 | 1 | 2014 | 2014 | | |
| Ryan Nembhard^ | G | 9 | 1† | 2025 | present | | |
| Johnny Newman | F/G | 2 | 1 | 2001 | 2002 | | |
| Kurt Nimphius | C/F | 40 | 5 | 1981 | 1985 | | |
| Nerlens Noel | C/F | 3 | 2 | 2017 | 2018 | | |
| Steve Novak | F | 21 | 1 | 2010 | 2011 | | |
| Dirk Nowitzki* | F | 41^{#} | 21† | 1998 | 2019 | • NBA champion (2011) • NBA Finals Most Valuable Player (2011) • NBA Most Valuable Player (2007) • 14× NBA All-Star (2002, 2003, 2004, 2005, 2006, 2007, 2008, 2009, 2010, 2011, 2012, 2014, 2015, 2019) • 4× All-NBA First Team (2005, 2006, 2007, 2009) • 5× All-NBA Second Team (2002, 2003, 2008, 2010, 2011) • 3× All-NBA Third Team (2001, 2004, 2012) • NBA All-Star Three-Point Shootout champion (2006) • NBA Teammate of the Year (2017) | |
| Frank Ntilikina | G | 21 | 2 | 2021 | 2023 | | |
| Dennis Nutt | G | 21 | 1† | 1986 | 1987 | | |
| Ed O'Bannon | F | 31 | 1 | 1997 | 1997 | | |
| Lamar Odom | F | 7 | 1 | 2011 | 2012 | | |
| Kevin Ollie | G | 3 | 1 | 1997 | 1997 | | |
| Zaza Pachulia | F/C | 27 | 1 | 2015 | 2016 | | |
| Robert Pack | G | 14 | 4 | 1997 | 2000 | | |
| Walter Palmer | C/F | 31 | 1 | 1992 | 1993 | | |
| Cherokee Parks | C/F | 4 | 1 | 1995 | 1996 | | |
| Chandler Parsons | F | 25 | 2 | 2014 | 2016 | | |
| Sasha Pavlović | G/F | 7 | 1 | 2011 | 2011 | | |
| Sam Perkins | C/F | 41 / 44 | 6 | 1984 | 1990 | • NBA All-Rookie First Team (1985) | |
| Roger Phegley | G/F | 21 | 1 | 1984 | 1984 | | |
| Stan Pietkiewicz | G/F | 43 | 1 | 1981 | 1981 | | |
| Theo Pinson | G | 1 | 2 | 2021 | 2023 | | |
| Pavel Podkolzin | C | 24 | 2† | 2004 | 2006 | | |
| Kristaps Porziņģis | F/C | 6 | 3 | 2019 | 2022 | | |
| John Poulakidas^ | G | 1 | 1† | 2026 | present | | |
| Dwight Powell^ | C | 7 / 8 | 12 | 2014 | present | | |
| Josh Powell | F | 33 | 1 | 2005 | 2006 | | |
| Olivier-Maxence Prosper | F | 8 / 18 | 2 | 2023 | 2025 | | |
| Brian Quinnett | F | 23 | 1 | 1992 | 1992 | | |
| Kelvin Ransey | G | 14 | 1 | 1982 | 1983 | | |
| Khalid Reeves | G | 6 | 2 | 1997 | 1998 | | |
| Shawn Respert | G | 21 | 1 | 1998 | 1998 | | |
| Rodrick Rhodes | G/F | 2 | 1 | 2000 | 2000 | | |
| Antoine Rigaudeau | G | 17 | 1† | 2003 | 2003 | | |
| Eric Riley | C | 50 | 1 | 1997 | 1998 | | |
| Fred Roberts | F/C | 44 | 1 | 1996 | 1997 | | |
| Jeremiah Robinson-Earl | F | 23 | 1 | 2026 | 2026 | | |
| Bill Robinzine | F | 54 | 1 | 1980 | 1981 | | |
| Dennis Rodman* | F | 70 | 1 | 2000 | 2000 | | |
| Rajon Rondo | G | 9 | 1 | 2014 | 2015 | | |
| Sean Rooks | C | 45 | 3 | 1992; 1999 | 1994; 2000 | | |
| Quinton Ross | G | 6 | 1 | 2009 | 2010 | | |
| D'Angelo Russell | G | 5 | 1 | 2025 | 2026 | | |
| Jason Sasser | F | 33 | 1 | 1997 | 1997 | | |
| Detlef Schrempf | F/C | 32 | 4 | 1985 | 1989 | | |
| Dennis Scott | F | 7 | 1 | 1997 | 1998 | | |
| John Shasky | C | 55 | 1 | 1990 | 1991 | | |
| James Singleton | F | 33 | 2 | 2008 | 2010 | | |
| Charlie Sitton | F | 52 | 1† | 1984 | 1985 | | |
| Reggie Slater | F | 50 | 1 | 1996 | 1996 | | |
| Tom Sluby | G | 7 | 1† | 1984 | 1985 | | |
| Dennis Smith Jr. | G | 1 | 2 | 2017 | 2019 | • NBA All-Rookie Second Team (2018) | |
| Doug Smith | F | 34 | 4 | 1991 | 1995 | | |
| Greg Smith | F/C | 4 | 1 | 2014 | 2015 | | |
| Stevin Smith | G | 1 | 1† | 1997 | 1997 | | |
| Tyler Smith^ | F | 23 | 1 | 2026 | present | | |
| Jim Spanarkel | G/F | 33 / 34 | 4 | 1980 | 1984 | • Drafted in the 1980 NBA expansion draft | |
| Jerry Stackhouse | G/F | 42 | 5 | 2004 | 2009 | | |
| DeShawn Stevenson | G | 92 | 2 | 2010 | 2011 | • NBA champion (2011) | |
| Peja Stojaković | F/G | 16 | 1 | 2011 | 2011 | • NBA champion (2011) | |
| Amar'e Stoudemire* | F/C | 1 | 1 | 2015 | 2015 | | |
| Erick Strickland | G | 20 | 4 | 1996 | 2000 | | |
| Mark Strickland | F | 0 / 30 | 1 | 2002 | 2002 | | |
| Lamont Strothers | G | 10 | 1 | 1993 | 1993 | | |
| Bruno Šundov | C | 40 | 2 | 1998 | 2000 | | |
| Roy Tarpley | C/F | 42 | 6† | 1986; 1994 | 1991; 1995 | • NBA Sixth Man of the Year (1988) • NBA All-Rookie Second Team (1987) | |
| Jason Terry | G | 31 | 8 | 2004 | 2012 | • NBA champion (2011) • NBA Sixth Man of the Year (2009) | |
| Kurt Thomas | F | 40 | 1 | 1997 | 1998 | | |
| Tim Thomas | F | 7 | 1 | 2009 | 2010 | | |
| Corny Thompson | F | 25 | 1† | 1982 | 1983 | | |
| Klay Thompson^ | F | 31 | 2 | 2024 | present | | |
| Elston Turner | G/F | 33 | 3 | 1981 | 1984 | | |
| Terry Tyler | F/G | 41 | 1 | 1988 | 1989 | | |
| Kelvin Upshaw | G | 5 | 2 | 1990 | 1991 | | |
| Nick Van Exel | G | 31 | 2 | 2002 | 2003 | | |
| Keith Van Horn | F | 2 | 2 | 2005 | 2006 | | |
| Loy Vaught | F | 35 | 1 | 2000 | 2001 | | |
| João Vianna | F | 31 | 1† | 1991 | 1991 | | |
| Charlie Villanueva | F | 3 | 2 | 2014 | 2016 | | |
| Jay Vincent | F | 31 | 5 | 1981 | 1986 | • NBA All-Rookie First Team (1982) | |
| Mark Wade | G | 10 | 1 | 1990 | 1990 | | |
| Antoine Walker | F | 8 | 1 | 2003 | 2004 | | |
| Samaki Walker | F | 52 | 3 | 1996 | 1999 | | |
| Wang Zhizhi | C/F | 16 | 2 | 2001 | 2002 | | |
| Jameel Warney | F | 32 | 1 | 2018 | 2018 | | |
| P. J. Washington^ | F | 25 | 3 | 2024 | present | | |
| Richard Washington | F/C | 31 | 1 | 1980 | 1980 | • Drafted in the 1980 NBA expansion draft | |
| Jamie Watson | F/G | 3 | 1 | 1997 | 1997 | | |
| Bubba Wells | F/G | 35 | 1† | 1997 | 1998 | | |
| Bill Wennington | C/F | 23 | 5 | 1985 | 1990 | | |
| Delonte West | G | 13 | 1 | 2011 | 2012 | | |
| Mark West | C/F | 45 | 1 | 1983 | 1984 | | |
| Randy White | F | 33 / 52 | 5† | 1989 | 1994 | | |
| Jerome Whitehead | C/F | 54 | 1 | 1980 | 1980 | • Drafted in the 1980 NBA expansion draft | |
| Morlon Wiley | G | 20 | 4 | 1988; 1993; 1994 | 1989; 1993; 1995 | | |
| Brandon Williams^ | G | 00 / 10 | 3 | 2023 | present | | |
| Deron Williams | G | 8 | 2 | 2015 | 2017 | | |
| Grant Williams | F | 3 | 1 | 2023 | 2024 | | |
| Herb Williams | C/F | 32 | 4 | 1989 | 1992 | | |
| Hot Rod Williams | F/C | 18 | 1 | 1999 | 1999 | | |
| Lorenzo Williams | F/C | 44 | 3 | 1994 | 1996 | | |
| Scott Williams | F/C | 42 | 1 | 2004 | 2004 | | |
| Sean Williams | F/C | 32 | 1 | 2011 | 2012 | | |
| Shawne Williams | F | 4 | 1 | 2008 | 2009 | | |
| Walt Williams | F/G | 43 | 1 | 2002 | 2003 | | |
| Kevin Willis | F/C | 45 | 1 | 2007 | 2007 | | |
| Al Wood | G/F | 4 | 1 | 1986 | 1987 | | |
| Christian Wood | F | 35 | 1 | 2022 | 2023 | | |
| David Wood | F | 10 | 1 | 1996 | 1996 | | |
| Antoine Wright | G/F | 21 | 2 | 2008 | 2009 | | |
| Brandan Wright | F | 34 | 4 | 2011 | 2014 | | |
| Chris Wright | G | 8 | 1† | 2013 | 2013 | | |
| Howard Wright | F | 34 | 1 | 1991 | 1991 | | |
| McKinley Wright IV | G | 23 | 1 | 2022 | 2023 | | |
| Yi Jianlian | F | 9 | 1 | 2012 | 2012 | | |

== International players ==
In the National Basketball Association (NBA), foreign players—also known as international players—are those who were born outside of the United States. Players who were born in U.S. overseas territories, such as Puerto Rico, U.S. Virgin Islands and Guam, are considered international players even if they are U.S. citizens. In some borderline cases, the NBA takes into consideration whether a player desires to be identified as international. 45 international players have played for the Mavericks. The first foreign-born Maverick is Rolando Blackman, who was born in Panama. However, he grew up in the United States and was drafted from Kansas State University in 1981. In the 1985 draft, the Mavericks selected three foreign players in the first round; German forward Detlef Schrempf, Canadian center Bill Wennington and German center Uwe Blab.

In 1998, the Mavericks acquired Canadian guard Steve Nash from the Phoenix Suns and the draft rights to German forward Dirk Nowitzki from the Milwaukee Bucks. Nash and Nowitzki quickly became the cornerstone of the franchise and in 2001 they led the Mavericks to their first playoffs in 11 years. However, Nash returned to the Suns as a free agent in 2004, while Nowitzki continued with the team and finally led the Mavericks to their first NBA title in 2011. In the 1999 draft, the Mavericks drafted Chinese center Wang Zhizhi. After almost two years of negotiation with Wang's Chinese team, he was finally signed in April 2001 and became the first Chinese player to play the NBA.

The following is a list of international players who have played for the Mavericks, listed by their national team affiliation.

Australia

- Chris Anstey
- Danté Exum
- Josh Green
- Kyrie Irving (born in Australia but never represented Australia internationally)

(The Bahamas) Bahamas

- Dexter Cambridge

Belgium

- Didier Ilunga-Mbenga (born in Zaire (now DR Congo), became a naturalized Belgian citizen, represented Belgium internationally)

Brazil

- João Vianna

Canada

- Samuel Dalembert (born in Haiti, became a naturalized Canadian citizen, represented Canada internationally)
- Jamaal Magloire (born in Canada but never represented Canada internationally)
- Steve Nash (born in South Africa to an English father and a Welsh mother, grew up in Canada, became a naturalized Canadian citizen, represented Canada internationally)
- Ryan Nembhard
- Dwight Powell
- Olivier-Maxence Prosper
- Bill Wennington

China

- Wang Zhizhi
- Yi Jianlian

Croatia

- Bruno Šundov (born in SR Croatia, SFR Yugoslavia (now Croatia), represented Croatia internationally at youth level)

Dominican Republic

- Charlie Villanueva (born in the United States, represents Dominican Republic internationally)

Estonia

- Martin Müürsepp

France

- Tariq Abdul-Wahad
- Alexis Ajinça
- Rodrigue Beaubois
- Ian Mahinmi
- Frank Ntilikina
- Antoine Rigaudeau

(Georgia (country)) Georgia

- Zaza Pachulia

Germany

- Uwe Blab (born in West Germany, also represented West Germany internationally before the reunification)
- Shawn Bradley (born in West Germany to American parents, grew up in the United States, represented Germany internationally)
- Chris Kaman (born in the United States, represents Germany internationally)
- Maxi Kleber
- Dirk Nowitzki (born in West Germany)
- Detlef Schrempf (born in West Germany, also represented West Germany internationally before the reunification)

(United Kingdom) Great Britain

- James Donaldson (born in England but never represented England or Great Britain internationally)
- Pops Mensah-Bonsu

Guinea

- Moussa Cissé

Guyana

- Rawle Marshall (born in Guyana but never represented Guyana internationally)

Israel

- Gal Mekel

Latvia

- Dāvis Bertāns
- Kristaps Porziņģis

Mexico

- Eduardo Nájera

Nigeria

- Josh Akognon (born in the United States, represents Nigeria internationally)
- Al-Farouq Aminu (born in the United States, represents Nigeria internationally)
- Kelenna Azubuike (born in England to Nigerian parents, grew up in the United States, but does not hold British citizenship and never represented either England, Great Britain, Nigeria or United States internationally)
- Obinna Ekezie

Panama

- Rolando Blackman (born in Panama, grew up in the United States, became a naturalized U.S. citizen, represented the United States internationally)

Puerto Rico

- J. J. Barea

Russia

- Pavel Podkolzin (represented Russia internationally at youth level)

Senegal

- DeSagana Diop
- Mamadou N'Diaye

Serbia and Montenegro / FR Yugoslavia

- Radisav Ćurčić (born in SR Serbia, SFR Yugoslavia (now Serbia), represented SFR Yugoslavia internationally)
- Predrag Danilović (born in SR Bosnia and Herzegovina, SFR Yugoslavia (now Bosnia and Herzegovina), represented SFR Yugoslavia and FR Yugoslavia internationally)
- Sasha Pavlović (born in SR Montenegro, SFR Yugoslavia (now Montenegro), represented FR Yugoslavia internationally)
- Peja Stojaković (born in SR Croatia, SFR Yugoslavia (now Croatia), represented FR Yugoslavia and Serbia and Montenegro internationally)

Slovenia

- Luka Dončić

Spain

- José Calderón

Tunisia

- Salah Mejri

(United States Virgin Islands) U.S. Virgin Islands

- Raja Bell

== Statistics leaders ==
Note: Statistics are correct as of the beginning of the 2026–27 NBA regular season.

| ^ | Denotes player who is currently on the Mavericks roster |

=== Games ===
Regular season
| Rank | Player | Games |
|---|---|---|
| 1 | Dirk Nowitzki | 1,522 |
| 2 | Brad Davis | 885 |
| 3 | Derek Harper | 872 |
| 4 | Rolando Blackman | 865 |
| 5 | Dwight Powell | 763 |
| 6 | J. J. Barea | 637 |
| 7 | Michael Finley | 626 |
| 8 | Jason Terry | 619 |
| 9 | Devin Harris | 608 |
| 10 | Shawn Bradley | 582 |

Playoffs
| Rank | Player | Games |
|---|---|---|
| 1 | Dirk Nowitzki | 145 |
| 2 | Jason Terry | 87 |
| 3 | Josh Howard | 62 |
| 4 | Erick Dampier | 57 |
| 5 | Michael Finley | 56 |

=== Minutes ===
Regular season
| Rank | Player | Minutes |
|---|---|---|
| 1 | Dirk Nowitzki | 51,368 |
| 2 | Rolando Blackman | 29,684 |
| 3 | Derek Harper | 27,985 |
| 4 | Michael Finley | 24,878 |
| 5 | Brad Davis | 21,402 |
| 6 | Jason Terry | 20,219 |
| 7 | Mark Aguirre | 19,154 |
| 8 | Jason Kidd | 17,303 |
| 9 | Sam Perkins | 15,657 |
| 10 | James Donaldson | 15,597 |

Playoffs
| Rank | Player | Minutes |
|---|---|---|
| 1 | Dirk Nowitzki | 5,895 |
| 2 | Jason Terry | 3,076 |
| 3 | Michael Finley | 2,316 |
| 4 | Josh Howard | 2,052 |
| 5 | Luka Dončić | 1,948 |

=== Points ===
Regular season
| Rank | Player | Points |
|---|---|---|
| 1 | Dirk Nowitzki | 31,560 |
| 2 | Rolando Blackman | 16,643 |
| 3 | Mark Aguirre | 13,930 |
| 4 | Derek Harper | 12,597 |
| 5 | Michael Finley | 12,389 |
| 6 | Luka Dončić | 12,089 |
| 7 | Jason Terry | 9,953 |
| 8 | Brad Davis | 7,623 |
| 9 | Sam Perkins | 6,766 |
| 10 | Josh Howard | 6,614 |

Playoffs
| Rank | Player | Points |
|---|---|---|
| 1 | Dirk Nowitzki | 3,663 |
| 2 | Luka Dončić | 1,546 |
| 3 | Jason Terry | 1,466 |
| 4 | Rolando Blackman | 1,039 |
| 5 | Mark Aguirre | 1,035 |

=== Field goals ===
Regular season
| Rank | Player | FG |
|---|---|---|
| 1 | Dirk Nowitzki | 11,169 |
| 2 | Rolando Blackman | 6,487 |
| 3 | Mark Aguirre | 5,441 |
| 4 | Derek Harper | 4,899 |
| 5 | Michael Finley | 4,834 |
| 6 | Luka Dončić | 4,114 |
| 7 | Jason Terry | 3,719 |
| 8 | Brad Davis | 2,874 |
| 9 | Jay Vincent | 2,580 |
| 10 | Sam Perkins | 2,540 |

Playoffs
| Rank | Player | FG |
|---|---|---|
| 1 | Dirk Nowitzki | 1,220 |
| 2 | Luka Dončić | 545 |
| 3 | Jason Terry | 532 |
| 4 | Mark Aguirre | 415 |
| 5 | Rolando Blackman | 409 |

=== 3-point field goals ===
Regular season
| Rank | Player | 3P |
|---|---|---|
| 1 | Dirk Nowitzki | 1,982 |
| 2 | Luka Dončić | 1,276 |
| 3 | Jason Terry | 1,140 |
| 4 | Tim Hardaway Jr. | 981 |
| 5 | Michael Finley | 870 |
| 6 | Jason Kidd | 778 |
| 7 | Derek Harper | 705 |
| 8 | Dorian Finney-Smith | 637 |
| 9 | Wesley Matthews | 616 |
| 10 | J. J. Barea | 596 |

Playoffs
| Rank | Player | 3P |
|---|---|---|
| 1 | Jason Terry | 167 |
| 2 | Luka Dončić | 166 |
| 3 | Dirk Nowitzki | 149 |
| 4 | Michael Finley | 109 |
| 5 | Jason Kidd | 88 |

=== Free throws ===
Regular season
| Rank | Player | FT |
|---|---|---|
| 1 | Dirk Nowitzki | 7,240 |
| 2 | Rolando Blackman | 3,501 |
| 3 | Mark Aguirre | 2,815 |
| 4 | Luka Dončić | 2,585 |
| 5 | Derek Harper | 2,094 |
| 6 | Michael Finley | 1,851 |
| 7 | Sam Perkins | 1,629 |
| 8 | Brad Davis | 1,605 |
| 9 | Jason Terry | 1,375 |
| 10 | Jay Vincent | 1,303 |

Playoffs
| Rank | Player | FT |
|---|---|---|
| 1 | Dirk Nowitzki | 1,074 |
| 2 | Luka Dončić | 290 |
| 3 | Jason Terry | 235 |
| 4 | Rolando Blackman | 218 |
| 5 | Josh Howard | 208 |

=== Rebounds ===
Regular season
| Rank | Player | Rebounds |
|---|---|---|
| 1 | Dirk Nowitzki | 11,489 |
| 2 | James Donaldson | 4,589 |
| 3 | Sam Perkins | 3,767 |
| 4 | Luka Dončić | 3,655 |
| 5 | Shawn Bradley | 3,340 |
| 6 | Dwight Powell | 3,251 |
| 7 | Michael Finley | 3,245 |
| 8 | Mark Aguirre | 3,244 |
| 9 | Erick Dampier | 3,211 |
| 10 | Rolando Blackman | 3,083 |

Playoffs
| Rank | Player | Rebounds |
|---|---|---|
| 1 | Dirk Nowitzki | 1,447 |
| 2 | Luka Dončić | 469 |
| 3 | Josh Howard | 444 |
| 4 | Erick Dampier | 356 |
| 5 | Roy Tarpley | 307 |

=== Blocks ===
Regular season
| Rank | Player | Blocks |
|---|---|---|
| 1 | Dirk Nowitzki | 1,281 |
| 2 | Shawn Bradley | 1,250 |
| 3 | James Donaldson | 615 |
| 4 | Erick Dampier | 546 |
| 5 | Kurt Nimphius | 475 |
| 6 | Sam Perkins | 444 |
| 7 | Maxi Kleber | 378 |
| 8 | DeSagana Diop | 347 |
| 9 | Herb Williams | 346 |
| 10 | Dwight Powell | 330 |

Playoffs
| Rank | Player | Blocks |
|---|---|---|
| 1 | Dirk Nowitzki | 129 |
| 2 | Raef LaFrentz | 65 |
| 3 | Erick Dampier | 59 |
| 4 | Shawn Bradley | 47 |
| 5 | Roy Tarpley | 43 |

=== Assists ===
Regular season
| Rank | Player | Assists |
|---|---|---|
| 1 | Derek Harper | 5,111 |
| 2 | Brad Davis | 4,524 |
| 3 | Jason Kidd | 4,211 |
| 4 | Dirk Nowitzki | 3,651 |
| 5 | Luka Dončić | 3,489 |
| 6 | Steve Nash | 2,919 |
| 7 | Rolando Blackman | 2,748 |
| 8 | Jason Terry | 2,524 |
| 9 | J. J. Barea | 2,441 |
| 10 | Michael Finley | 2,393 |

Playoffs
| Rank | Player | Assists |
|---|---|---|
| 1 | Luka Dončić | 398 |
| 2 | Dirk Nowitzki | 360 |
| 3 | Steve Nash | 324 |
| 4 | Jason Kidd | 312 |
| 5 | Jason Terry | 302 |

=== Steals ===
Regular season
| Rank | Player | Steals |
|---|---|---|
| 1 | Derek Harper | 1,551 |
| 2 | Dirk Nowitzki | 1,210 |
| 3 | Jason Kidd | 954 |
| 4 | Michael Finley | 748 |
| 5 | Jason Terry | 735 |
| 6 | Brad Davis | 712 |
| 7 | Rolando Blackman | 668 |
| 8 | Devin Harris | 559 |
| 9 | Luka Dončić | 511 |
| 10 | Mark Aguirre | 502 |

Playoffs
| Rank | Player | Steals |
|---|---|---|
| 1 | Dirk Nowitzki | 149 |
| 2 | Jason Kidd | 95 |
| 3 | Jason Terry | 87 |
| 4 | Luka Dončić | 84 |
| 5 | Derek Harper | 83 |

== Single game leaders ==
Points
| Rank | Player | Points | Date |
|---|---|---|---|
| 1 | Luka Dončić | 73 | January 26, 2024 |
| 2 | Luka Dončić | 60 | December 28, 2022 |
| 3 | Luka Dončić | 53 | January 30, 2023 |
| 3 | Dirk Nowitzki | 53 | December 2, 2004 |
| 5 | Luka Dončić | 51 | February 10, 2022 |
| 5 | Luka Dončić | 51 | December 31, 2022 |
| 5 | Cooper Flagg^ | 51 | April 3, 2026 |
| 5 | Dirk Nowitzki | 51 | March 23, 2006 |
| 8 | Luka Dončić | 50 | December 23, 2022 |
| 8 | Luka Dončić | 50 | December 25, 2023 |
| 8 | Jim Jackson | 50 | November 26, 1994 |
| 8 | Jamal Mashburn | 50 | November 12, 1994 |

Source: https://stathead.com/tiny/50L9i

Rebounds
| Rank | Player | Rebounds | Date |
|---|---|---|---|
| 1 | Popeye Jones | 28 | January 9, 1996 |
| 2 | James Donaldson | 27 | December 29, 1989 |
| 2 | Popeye Jones | 27 | April 6, 1996 |
| 4 | Erick Dampier | 26 | January 29, 2005 |
| 5 | Tyson Chandler | 25 | November 26, 2014 |
| 5 | Roy Tarpley | 25 | April 1, 1990 |

Source: https://stathead.com/tiny/hZ75o

Assists
| Rank | Player | Assists | Date |
|---|---|---|---|
| 1 | Jason Kidd | 25 | February 8, 1996 |
| 2 | Ryan Nembhard | 23 | April 12, 2026 |
| 3 | Luka Dončić | 20 | May 1, 2021 |
| 3 | Jason Kidd | 20 | April 5, 2009 |
| 5 | Luka Dončić | 19 | August 8, 2020 |
| 5 | Luka Dončić | 19 | April 16, 2021 |
| 5 | Steve Nash | 19 | April 1, 2004 |

Source: https://stathead.com/tiny/YQ8L6

== Notes ==
- ^{a} Players can sometimes be assigned more than one jersey number.
- ^{b} Each year is linked to an article about that particular NBA season.
- ^{c} Only includes achievements as Mavericks players.
