= 1980 NBA expansion draft =

Player selection draft

General information
- Sport: Basketball
- Date: May 28, 1980

Overview
- League: NBA
- Expansion team: Dallas Mavericks

The 1980 NBA expansion draft was the seventh expansion draft of the National Basketball Association (NBA). The draft was held on May 28, 1980, so that the newly founded Dallas Mavericks could acquire players for the upcoming 1980–81 season. Dallas had been awarded the expansion team on February 3, 1980. In an NBA expansion draft, new NBA teams are allowed to acquire players from the previously established teams in the league. Not all players on a given team are available during an expansion draft, since each team can protect a certain number of players from being selected. In this draft, each of the twenty-two other NBA teams had protected eight players from their roster and the Mavericks selected twenty-two unprotected players, one from each team.

The Mavericks were formed and owned by a group headed by Don Carter and Norm Sonju. Washington Bullets head coach and 1971 Coach of the Year Dick Motta was hired as the franchise's first head coach. The Mavericks' went with young players in the expansion draft and avoided selecting experienced players with large contracts or injury problems. Eighteen of the twenty-two players chosen had less than three years of NBA experience. The Mavericks' selections included former first overall pick Austin Carr, one-time All-Defensive Team Jim Cleamons and eleven-year veteran Bingo Smith. However, Cleamons and Smith never played for the Mavericks and Carr only played briefly before he was sold to the Washington Bullets. Eleven of the selections were former first-round draft picks. Eleven players from the expansion draft joined the Mavericks for their inaugural season, but only two played more than one season for the team. Tom LaGarde played two seasons and Jim Spanarkel played four seasons for the Mavericks.

== Key ==
Pos.	G	F	C
Position	Guard	Forward	Center

^{+}	Denotes player who has been selected for at least one All-Star Game

== Selections ==
Player	Pos.	Nationality	Previous team	Years of NBA experience^{[a]}	Career with the franchise	Ref.
Del Beshore	G	United States	Chicago Bulls	2	—^{[b]}	
Winford Boynes	G/F	United States	New Jersey Nets	2	1980–1981	
Alonzo Bradley	F	United States	Houston Rockets	3	—^{[b]}	
Mike Bratz	G	United States	Phoenix Suns	3	—^{[b]}	
Marty Byrnes	F	United States	Los Angeles Lakers	2	1980–1981	
Austin Carr^{+}	G	United States	Cleveland Cavaliers	9	1980	
Jim Cleamons	G	United States	Washington Bullets	9	—^{[b]}	
Terry Duerod	G	United States	Detroit Pistons	1	1980	
Jack Givens	G/F	United States	Atlanta Hawks	2	—^{[b]}	
Joe Hassett	G	United States	Indiana Pacers	3	1980	
Geoff Huston	G	United States	New York Knicks	1	1980–1981	
Abdul Jeelani^{[c]}	F/C	United States	Portland Trail Blazers	1	1980–1981	
Jeff Judkins	G/F	United States	Boston Celtics	2	—^{[b]}	
Arvid Kramer	C	United States	Denver Nuggets	1	—^{[b]}	
Tom LaGarde	F/C	United States	Seattle SuperSonics	3	1980–1982	
Billy McKinney	G	United States	Kansas City Kings	2	—^{[b]}	
Wiley Peck	G	United States	San Antonio Spurs	1	—^{[b]}	
Bingo Smith	G/F	United States	San Diego Clippers	11	—^{[b]}	
Jim Spanarkel	G/F	United States	Philadelphia 76ers	1	1980–1984	
Raymond Townsend	G	United States	Golden State Warriors	2	—^{[b]}	
Richard Washington	F/C	United States	Milwaukee Bucks	4	1980	
Jerome Whitehead	F/C	United States	Utah Jazz	2	1980	

== Notes ==
- ^{a} Number of years played in the NBA prior to the draft
- ^{b} Never played a game for the franchise
- ^{c} Abdul Jeelani was known as Gary Cole during his college career.
