= List of Dallas Mavericks head coaches =

The Dallas Mavericks are an American professional basketball team based in Dallas. They play in the Southwest Division of the Western Conference in the National Basketball Association (NBA). The team joined the NBA in 1980 as an expansion team, and won their first Western Conference championship in 2006. The Mavericks have played their home games at the American Airlines Center since 2001. The Mavericks are owned by Mark Cuban, and Nico Harrison is their general manager.

There have been nine head coaches for the Mavericks franchise. The franchise's first head coach was Dick Motta, who served for two non-consecutive stints, and coached for nine seasons with the Mavericks. Rick Carlisle is the franchise's all-time leader for the most regular-season games coached (961), the most regular season wins (513), the most regular-season losses (448), the most playoff games coached (64), and the most playoff wins (27). Avery Johnson is the franchise's all-time leader for the highest winning percentage in the regular season (.735). Don Nelson is named one of the top 10 coaches in NBA history. Johnson led the Mavericks to the franchise's first Finals appearance in 2006, only to lose to the Miami Heat in six games. Johnson is also the only Mavericks coach to have won the NBA Coach of the Year Award, having won it in the 2005–06 season. Quinn Buckner and Jim Cleamons have spent their entire NBA head coaching careers with the Mavericks. Only one of the Mavericks coaches, Don Nelson, has been elected into the Basketball Hall of Fame as a coach. Rick Carlisle, who was the head coach of the Mavericks from 2008 to 2021, led the Mavericks to the franchise's first NBA Championship in its second Finals appearance, and defeated the Miami Heat in six games in the 2011 NBA Finals. Jason Kidd, a player in the Maverick's 2011 championship team, became coach in 2021 with the departure of Carlisle.

== Key ==
| GC | Games coached |
| W | Wins |
| L | Losses |
| Win% | Winning percentage |
| # | Number of coaches^{[a]} |
| * | Spent entire NBA head coaching career with the Mavericks |
| † | Elected into the Basketball Hall of Fame as a coach |

== Coaches ==
Note: Statistics are correct through the end of the 2025–26 season.

| # | Name | Term^{[b]} | GC | W | L | Win% | GC | W | L | Win% | Achievements | Reference |
| # | Name | Term^{[b]} | Regular season | | | | Playoffs | | | | Achievements | Reference |
|---|---|---|---|---|---|---|---|---|---|---|---|---|
| 1 | Dick Motta | 1980–1987 | 574 | 267 | 307 | .465 | 28 | 11 | 17 | .393 | | |
| 2 | John MacLeod | 1987–1989 | 175 | 96 | 79 | .549 | 17 | 10 | 7 | .588 | | |
| 3 | Richie Adubato | 1989–1992 | 264 | 94 | 170 | .356 | 3 | 0 | 3 | .000 | | |
| 4 | Gar Heard | 1992–1993 | 53 | 9 | 44 | .170 | — | — | — | — | | |
| 5 | Quinn Buckner* | 1993–1994 | 82 | 13 | 69 | .159 | — | — | — | — | | |
| — | Dick Motta | 1994–1996 | 164 | 62 | 102 | .378 | — | — | — | — | | |
| 6 | Jim Cleamons* | 1996–1997 | 98 | 28 | 70 | .286 | — | — | — | — | | |
| 7 | Don Nelson† | 1997–2005 | 590 | 339 | 251 | .575 | 43 | 19 | 24 | .442 | One of the top 10 coaches in NBA history | |
| 8 | Avery Johnson | 2005–2008 | 264 | 194 | 70 | .735 | 47 | 23 | 24 | .489 | 2005–06 NBA Coach of the Year; 2005–06 Western Conference championship | |
| 9 | Rick Carlisle | 2008–2021 | 1033 | 555 | 478 | .537 | 71 | 33 | 38 | .465 | 1 NBA Championship (2011) | |
| 10 | Jason Kidd | 2021–2026 | 410 | 205 | 205 | .500 | 40 | 22 | 18 | .550 | 2023–24 Western Conference championship | |
| 11 | Dusty May* | 2026–present | — | — | — | – | — | — | — | – | | |

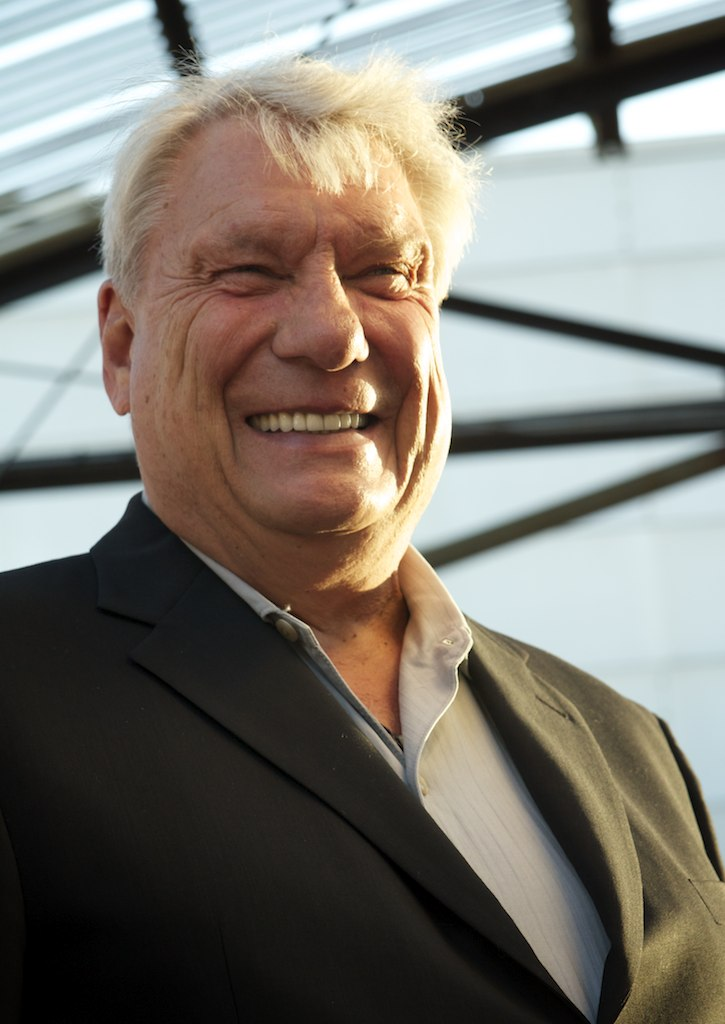
Don Nelson as a head coach for the Dallas Mavericks in 1997–2005

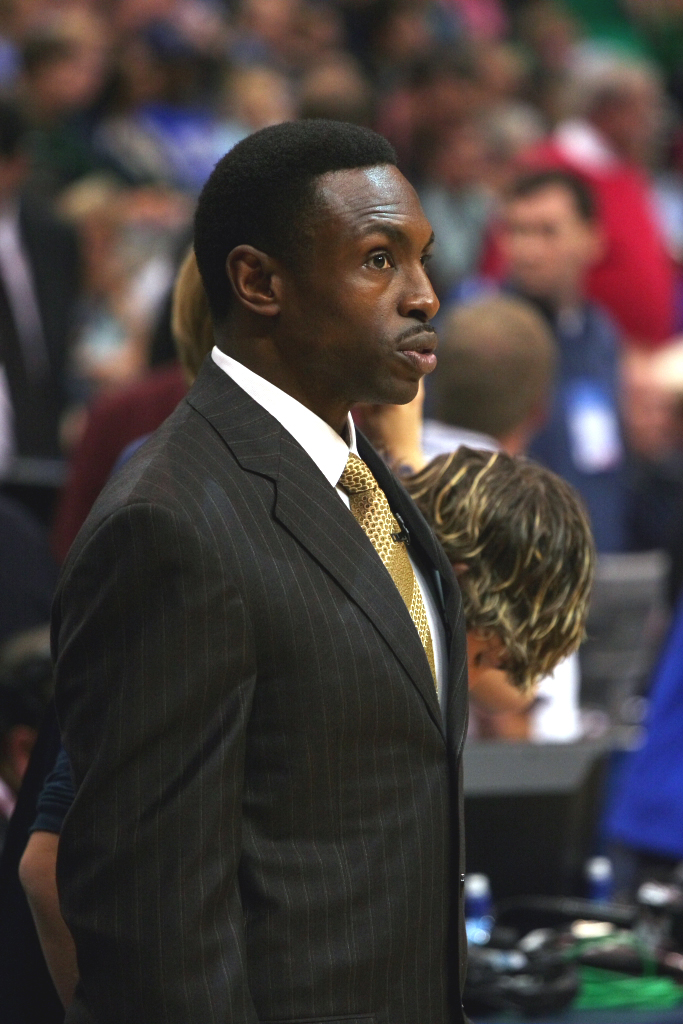
Avery Johnson as a head coach for the Dallas Mavericks in 2005–2008

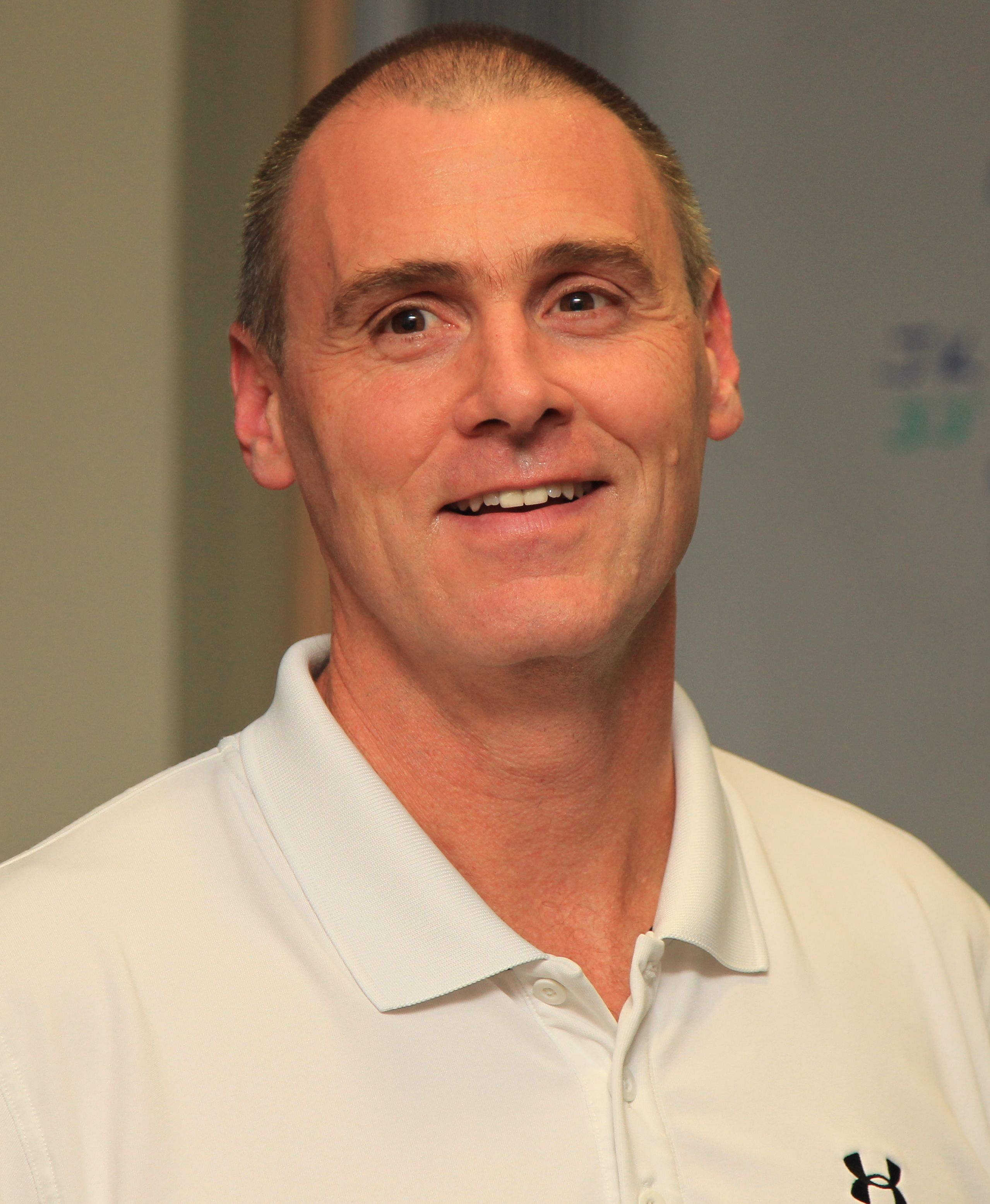
Rick Carlisle as a head coach for the Dallas Mavericks in 2008–2021

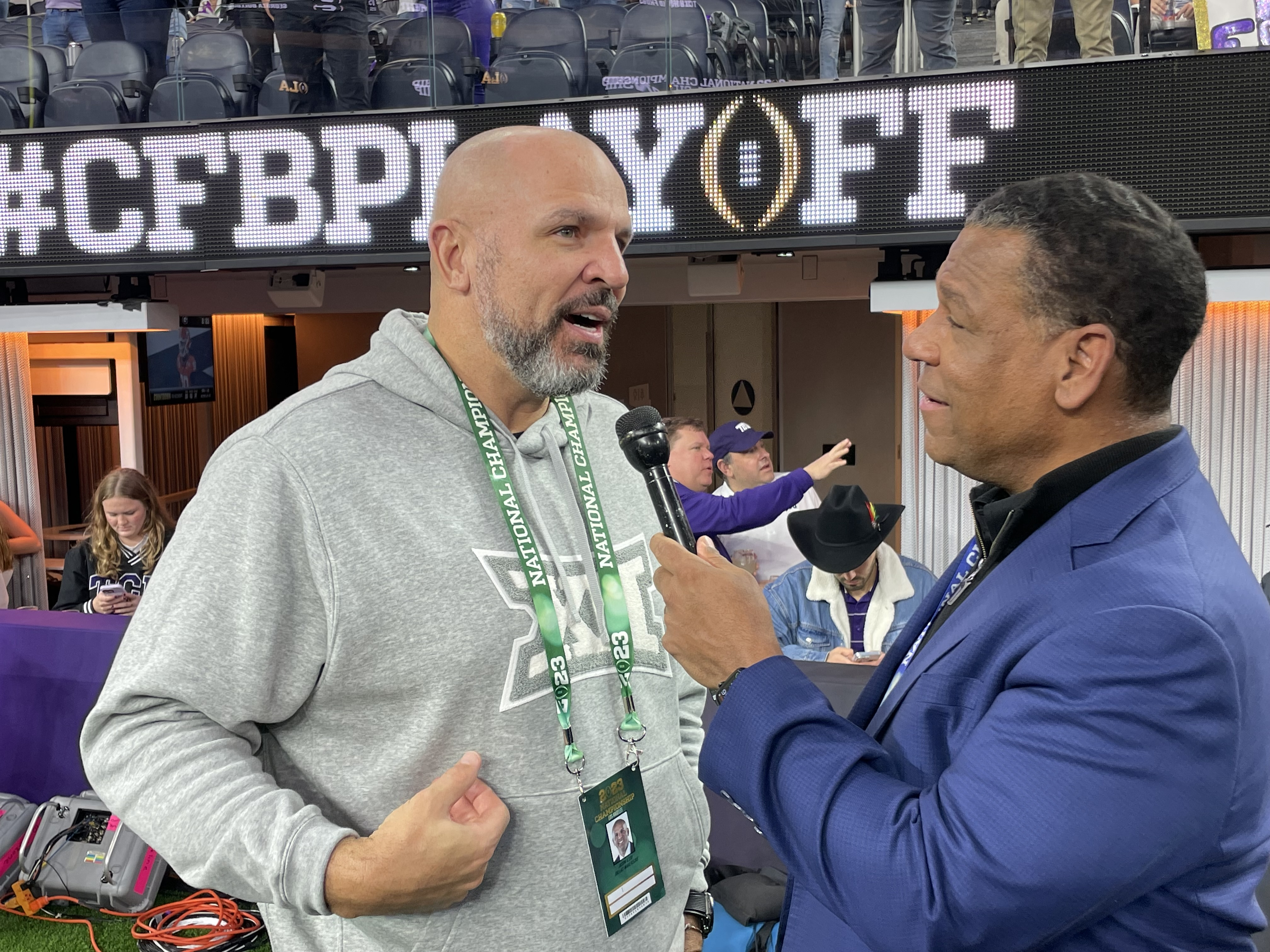
Jason Kidd (left) as a head coach for the Dallas Mavericks in 2021–2026

== Notes ==
- ^{a} A running total of the number of coaches of the Mavericks. Thus, any coach who has two or more separate terms as head coach is only counted once.
- ^{b} Each year is linked to an article about that particular NBA season.
